= 2010 Humboldt State Lumberjacks football team =

American college football season

2010 Humboldt State Lumberjacks football
- Conference: Great Northwest Athletic Conference
- Record: 8–3 (6–2 GNAC)
- Head coach: Rob Smith (3rd season)
- Offensive coordinator: Eric Tripp (3rd season)
- Defensive coordinator: Shay McClure (5th season)
- Home stadium: Redwood Bowl

2010 Great Northwest Athletic Conference football standings
| | Conf. | | | Overall |
| Team | W | | L | W | | L |
|---|---|---|---|---|---|---|
| Central Washington $ | 7 | – | 1 | 8 | – | 3 |
| Humboldt State | 6 | – | 2 | 8 | – | 3 |
| Western Oregon | 5 | – | 3 | 7 | – | 4 |
| Dixie State | 2 | – | 6 | 2 | – | 8 |
| Simon Fraser # | 0 | – | 8 | 1 | – | 9 |
$ – Conference champion; # – Provisional NCAA Division II member

The 2010 Humboldt State Lumberjacks football team represented Humboldt State University—now known as California State Polytechnic University, Humboldt—as a member of the Great Northwest Athletic Conference (GNAC) during the 2010 NCAA Division II football season. Led by third-year head coach Rob Smith, the Lumberjacks compiled an overall record of 8–3 with a mark of 6–2 in conference play, placing second in the GNAC. The team averaged over 30 points per game, outscoring opponents 357 to 202 for the season. Humboldt State played home games at the Redwood Bowl in Arcata, California.

== Schedule ==
| Date | Opponent | Site | Result | Attendance |
|---|---|---|---|---|
| September 4 | at No. 25 (FCS) Cal Poly* | Alex G. Spanos Stadium; San Luis Obispo, CA | L 17–23 | 7,345 |
| September 11 | at Dixie State | Hansen Stadium; St. George, UT | W 49–14 | 3,510 |
| September 18 | Menlo* | Redwood Bowl; Arcata, CA | W 32–13 | 3,010 |
| September 25 | at Western Oregon | McArthur Field; Monmouth, OR | W 14–7 | 2,762 |
| October 2 | No. 21 Central Washington | Redwood Bowl; Arcata, CA | W 25–24 | 4,612 |
| October 9 | at Azusa Pacific* | Cougar Athletic Stadium; Azusa, CA | W 39–32 | 5,132 |
| October 16 | Dixie State^{†} | Redwood Bowl; Arcata, CA | W 28–3 | 5,621 |
| October 23 | at Central Washington | Tomlinson Stadium; Ellensburg, WA | L 18–26 | 4,517 |
| October 30 | at Simon Fraser | Terry Fox Field; Burnaby, BC | W 35–14 | 923 |
| November 6 | Western Oregon | Redwood Bowl; Arcata, CA | L 24–26 | 3,089 |
| November 13 | Simon Fraser | Redwood Bowl; Arcata, CA | W 66–20 | 2,621 |
*Non-conference game; ^{†}Homecoming; Rankings from AFCA Poll released prior to the game

== Team players in the NFL ==
No Humboldt State players were selected in the 2011 NFL draft. The following finished their college career in 2010, were not drafted, but played in the NFL.

| Player | Position | First NFL team |
| Taylor Boggs | Center | 2011 New York Jets |
