= List of Great Northwest Athletic Conference football standings =

This is a list of yearly Great Northwest Athletic Conference football standings.

== Great Northwest standings ==
2012 Great Northwest Athletic Conference football standings
	Conf.			Overall
Team	W		L	W		L
Central Washington $	7	–	3	7	–	4
Humboldt State	6	–	4	7	–	4
Western Oregon	6	–	4	6	–	5
Simon Fraser	4	–	6	5	–	6
Azusa Pacific #	4	–	6	4	–	7
Dixie State	3	–	7	3	–	8
$ – Conference champion; # – Provisional Division II member; Rankings from AFCA Poll

2013 Great Northwest Athletic Conference football standings
	Conf.			Overall
Team	W		L	W		L
Azusa Pacific $#	9	–	1	9	–	2
Central Washington	7	–	3	7	–	4
Western Oregon	7	–	3	7	–	4
Dixie State	4	–	6	4	–	7
Simon Fraser	3	–	7	3	–	7
Humboldt State	0	–	10	0	–	11
$ – Conference champion; # – Provisional Division II member; Rankings from AFCA Poll

2014 Great Northwest Athletic Conference football standings
	Conf.			Overall
Team	W		L	W		L
No. 23 Azusa Pacific $	6	–	0	10	–	1
Humboldt State	4	–	2	8	–	2
Central Washington	4	–	2	7	–	4
Western Oregon	4	–	2	6	–	5
Simon Fraser	2	–	4	2	–	9
South Dakota Mines	1	–	5	2	–	9
Dixie State	0	–	6	1	–	10
$ – Conference champion; Rankings from AFCA Poll

2015 Great Northwest Athletic Conference football standings
	Conf.			Overall
Team	W		L	W		L
No. 16 Humboldt State $^	6	–	0	10	–	2
Western Oregon	5	–	1	7	–	4
Azusa Pacific	3	–	3	6	–	4
Central Washington	3	–	3	5	–	5
South Dakota Mines	2	–	4	6	–	5
Dixie State	2	–	4	3	–	7
Simon Fraser	0	–	6	0	–	9
$ – Conference champion; ^ – NCAA Division II playoff participant; Rankings from AFCA Poll

2016 Great Northwest Athletic Conference football standings
	Conf.			Overall
Team	W		L	W		L
No. 25 Azusa Pacific $^	8	–	0	9	–	3
Central Washington	6	–	2	7	–	3
Humboldt State	3	–	5	6	–	5
Western Oregon	3	–	5	4	–	6
Simon Fraser	0	–	8	0	–	10
$ – Conference champion; ^ – NCAA Division II playoff participant; Rankings from AFCA Poll
