= 2014 Humboldt State Lumberjacks football team =

American college football season

2014 Humboldt State Lumberjacks football
- Conference: Great Northwest Athletic Conference
- Record: 8–2 (4–2 GNAC)
- Head coach: Rob Smith (7th season)
- Offensive coordinator: Eric Tripp (7th season)
- Defensive coordinator: Shay McClure (9th season)
- Home stadium: Redwood Bowl

2014 Great Northwest Athletic Conference football standings
	Conf.			Overall
Team	W		L	W		L
No. 23 Azusa Pacific $	6	–	0	10	–	1
Humboldt State	4	–	2	8	–	2
Central Washington	4	–	2	7	–	4
Western Oregon	4	–	2	6	–	5
Simon Fraser	2	–	4	2	–	9
South Dakota Mines	1	–	5	2	–	9
Dixie State	0	–	6	1	–	10
$ – Conference champion; Rankings from AFCA Poll

The 2014 Humboldt State Lumberjacks football team represented Humboldt State University—now known as California State Polytechnic University, Humboldt—as a member of the Great Northwest Athletic Conference (GNAC) during the 2014 NCAA Division II football season. Led by seventh-year head coach Rob Smith, the Lumberjacks compiled an overall record of 8–2 with a mark of 4–2 in conference play, placing in a three-way tie for second in the GNAC. The team outscored its opponents 388 to 181 for the season. This was a remarkable turnaround from the previous season when the Lumberjacks were winless. Their offensive output increased from 15 points per game to 38, and the defense held the opponents to an average of 18 points versus 32 the previous year. Humboldt State played home games at the Redwood Bowl in Arcata, California.

== Schedule ==
Date	Opponent	Rank	Site	Result	Attendance
September 6	at Texas A&M–Kingsville*		Javelina Stadium; Kingsville, TX	W 27–14	7,500
September 13	Azusa Pacific*		Redwood Bowl; Arcata, CA	W 30–10	5,998
September 20	at Dixie State*		Hansen Stadium; St. George, UT	W 50–3	3,824
September 27	Western Oregon*		Redwood Bowl; Arcata, CA	W 34–16	5,201
October 4	South Dakota Mines^{†}		Redwood Bowl; Arcata, CA	W 53–0	7,081
October 9	at Azusa Pacific	No. 24	Cougar Athletic Stadium; Azusa, CA	L 21–55	4,277
October 25	Central Washington		Redwood Bowl; Arcata, CA	W 38–20	1,989
November 1	at Simon Fraser		Terry Fox Field; Burnaby, BC	W 33–17	375
November 8	at Western Oregon		McArthur Field; Monmouth, OR	L 31–33	2,876
November 15	Dixie State		Redwood Bowl; Arcata, CA	W 71–13	3,673
*Non-conference game; ^{†}Homecoming; Rankings from AFCA Poll released prior to the game
