= 2012 Humboldt State Lumberjacks football team =

American college football season

2012 Humboldt State Lumberjacks football
- Conference: Great Northwest Athletic Conference
- Record: 7–4 (6–4 GNAC)
- Head coach: Rob Smith (5th season)
- Offensive coordinator: Eric Tripp (5th season)
- Defensive coordinator: Shay McClure (7th season)
- Home stadium: Redwood Bowl

2012 Great Northwest Athletic Conference football standings
	Conf.			Overall
Team	W		L	W		L
Central Washington $	7	–	3	7	–	4
Humboldt State	6	–	4	7	–	4
Western Oregon	6	–	4	6	–	5
Simon Fraser	4	–	6	5	–	6
Azusa Pacific #	4	–	6	4	–	7
Dixie State	3	–	7	3	–	8
$ – Conference champion; # – Provisional NCAA Division II member

The 2012 Humboldt State Lumberjacks football team represented Humboldt State University—now known as California State Polytechnic University, Humboldt—as a member of the Great Northwest Athletic Conference (GNAC) during the 2012 NCAA Division II football season. Led by fifth-year head coach Rob Smith, the Lumberjacks compiled an overall record of 7–4 with a mark of 6–4 in conference play, tying for second place in the GNAC. The team outscored opponents 341 to 270 for the season. Humboldt State played home games at the Redwood Bowl in Arcata, California.

== Schedule ==
Date	Opponent	Rank	Site	Result	Attendance
August 30	Colorado Mesa*	No. 21	Redwood Bowl; Arcata, CA	W 38–19	4,198
September 8	Azusa Pacific	No. 17	Redwood Bowl; Arcata, CA	W 42–17	5,360
September 15	Simon Fraser	No. 11	Redwood Bowl; Arcata, CA	W 41–21	4,078
September 22	at Dixie State	No. 10	Hansen Stadium; St. George, UT	W 49–13	3,883
September 29	at Central Washington	No. 9	Tomlinson Stadium; Ellensburg, WA	L 3–31	3,470
October 6	Western Oregon	No. 24	Redwood Bowl; Arcata, CA	L 14–42	3,469
October 13	at Azusa Pacific		Cougar Athletic Stadium; Azusa, CA	W 24–20	2,264
October 20	Dixie State^{†}		Redwood Bowl; Arcata, CA	W 57–18	6,978
October 27	Central Washington		Redwood Bowl; Arcata, CA	W 14–10	4,996
November 3	at Simon Fraser		Terry Fox Field; Burnaby, BC	L 37–41	304
November 10	at Western Oregon		McArthur Field; Monmouth, OR	L 22–38	1,978
*Non-conference game; ^{†}Homecoming; Rankings from AFCA Poll released prior to the game
