= 2011 Humboldt State Lumberjacks football team =

American college football season

2011 Humboldt State Lumberjacks football

GNAC champion
- Conference: Great Northwest Athletic Conference

Ranking
- AFCA: No. 20
- Record: 9–1 (7–1 GNAC)
- Head coach: Rob Smith (4th season)
- Offensive coordinator: Eric Tripp (4th season)
- Defensive coordinator: Shay McClure (6th season)
- Home stadium: Redwood Bowl

2011 Great Northwest Athletic Conference football standings
	Conf.			Overall
Team	W		L	W		L
No. 20 Humboldt State $	7	–	1	9	–	1
Western Oregon	6	–	2	6	–	5
Central Washington	4	–	4	4	–	6
Simon Fraser #	2	–	6	3	–	7
Dixie State	1	–	7	1	–	10
$ – Conference champion; # – Provisional NCAA Division II member; Rankings from AFCA poll

The 2011 Humboldt State Lumberjacks football team represented Humboldt State University—now known as California State Polytechnic University, Humboldt—as a member of the Great Northwest Athletic Conference (GNAC) during the 2011 NCAA Division II football season. Led by fourth-year head coach Rob Smith, the Lumberjacks compiled an overall record of 9–1 with a mark of 7–1 in conference play, winning in the GNAC title. The nine wins were the most for the program in a season since the 1968 Humboldt State Lumberjacks football team won ten. The team averaged almost 35 points per game, outscoring opponents 349 to 197 for the season. Humboldt State played home games at the Redwood Bowl in Arcata, California.

== Schedule ==
Date	Opponent	Rank	Site	Result	Attendance
September 1	at Colorado Mesa*		Ralph Stocker Stadium; Grand Junction, CO	W 29–3	2,876
September 8	Central Washington		Redwood Bowl; Arcata, CA	W 38–36	7,031
September 24	at Simon Fraser		Terry Fox Field; Burnaby, BC	W 35–7	350
October 1	Dixie State		Redwood Bowl; Arcata, CA	W 56–27	6,652
October 8	at UC Davis*	No. 24	Aggie Stadium; Davis, CA	W 23–17	9,770
October 15	at Central Washington	No. 19	Tomlinson Stadium; Ellensburg, WA	W 30–20	4,617
October 22	at Western Oregon	No. 15	McArthur Field; Monmouth, OR	L 24–40	2,750
October 29	Simon Fraser	No. 21	Redwood Bowl; Arcata, CA	W 42–10	3,182
November 5	at Dixie State	No. 19	Hansen Stadium; St. George, UT	W 45–30	2,138
November 12	Western Oregon	No. 14	Redwood Bowl; Arcata, CA	W 37–7	6,012
*Non-conference game; Rankings from AFCA Poll released prior to the game
