= 2013 Humboldt State Lumberjacks football team =

American college football season

2013 Humboldt State Lumberjacks football
- Conference: Great Northwest Athletic Conference
- Record: 0–11 (0–10 GNAC)
- Head coach: Rob Smith (6th season)
- Offensive coordinator: Eric Tripp (6th season)
- Defensive coordinator: Shay McClure (8th season)
- Home stadium: Redwood Bowl

2013 Great Northwest Athletic Conference football standings
	Conf.			Overall
Team	W		L	W		L
Azusa Pacific $#	9	–	1	9	–	2
Central Washington	7	–	3	7	–	4
Western Oregon	7	–	3	7	–	4
Dixie State	4	–	6	4	–	7
Simon Fraser	3	–	7	3	–	7
Humboldt State	0	–	10	0	–	11
$ – Conference champion; # – Provisional NCAA Division II member

The 2013 Humboldt State Lumberjacks football team represented Humboldt State University—now known as California State Polytechnic University, Humboldt—as a member of the Great Northwest Athletic Conference (GNAC) during the 2013 NCAA Division II football season. Led by sixth-year head coach Rob Smith, the Lumberjacks compiled an overall record of 0–11 with a mark of 0–10 in conference play, placing last out of six teams in the GNAC. The team was outscored by its opponents 354 to 170 for the season, with none of the losses coming by less than seven points. This was the first time program has had a winless season since the 1984 Humboldt State Lumberjacks football team did so. Humboldt State played home games at the Redwood Bowl in Arcata, California.

== Schedule ==
Date	Opponent	Site	Result	Attendance
September 7	Simon Fraser	Redwood Bowl; Arcata, CA	L 27–41	6,759
September 14	at Portland State*	Jeld-Wen Field; Portland, OR	L 6–43	5,028
September 21	at Azusa Pacific	Cougar Athletic Stadium; Azusa, CA	L 2–28	3,788
September 28	Dixie State	Redwood Bowl; Arcata, CA	L 24–49	6,603
October 5	Central Washington	Redwood Bowl; Arcata, CA	L 13–21	3,329
October 12	at Western Oregon	McArthur Field; Monmouth, OR	L 21–38	2,076
October 19	Azusa Pacific	Redwood Bowl; Arcata, CA	L 13–21	1,367
October 26	at Dixie State	Hansen Stadium; St. George, UT	L 19–28	4,117
November 2	at Central Washington	Tomlinson Stadium; Ellensburg, WA	L 14–21	3,618
November 9	at Simon Fraser	Terry Fox Field; Burnaby, BC	L 17–38	545
November 16	Western Oregon	Redwood Bowl; Arcata, CA	L 14–26	1,991
*Non-conference game
