= 2017 Humboldt State Lumberjacks football team =

American college football season

2017 Humboldt State Lumberjacks football
- Conference: Great Northwest Athletic Conference
- Record: 8–2 (6–2 GNAC)
- Head coach: Rob Smith (10th season)
- Home stadium: Redwood Bowl

2017 Great Northwest Athletic Conference football standings
	Conf.			Overall
Team	W		L	W		L
No. 7 Central Washington $^	8	–	0	11	–	1
Humboldt State	6	–	2	8	–	2
Azusa Pacific	4	–	4	7	–	4
Western Oregon	2	–	6	3	–	8
Simon Fraser	0	–	8	0	–	10
$ – Conference champion; ^ – NCAA Division II playoff participant; Rankings from AFCA Poll

The 2017 Humboldt State Lumberjacks football team represented Humboldt State University—now known as California State Polytechnic University, Humboldt—as a member of the Great Northwest Athletic Conference (GNAC) during the 2017 NCAA Division II football season. Led by Rob Smith in his tenth and final season as head coach, the Lumberjacks compiled an overall record of 8–2 with a mark of 6–2 in conference play, placing second in the GNAC. The team outscored its opponents 421 to 263 for the season, averaging 42 points scored per game. Humboldt State played home games at the Redwood Bowl in Arcata, California.

Smith finished his tenure at Humboldt State a record of 63–44 (.589). His teams won two conference championship, in 2011 and 2015, and reached the NCAA Division II football championship playoffs once in 2015.

== Schedule ==
Date	Opponent	Rank	Site	Result	Attendance
September 9	at No. 8 Azusa Pacific		Citrus Stadium; Azusa, CA	W 30–19	5,739
September 16	Simon Fraser		Redwood Bowl; Arcata, CA	W 72–14	1,958
September 23	at Western Oregon	No. 22	McArthur Field; Monmouth, OR	W 49–48 ^{OT}	2,550
September 30	Chadron State*	No. 19	Redwood Bowl; Arcata, CA	W 56–13	2,764
October 7	at No. 13 Central Washington	No. 17	Tomlinson Stadium; Ellensburg, WA	L 27–55	6,032
October 14	Azusa Pacific^{†}	No. 25	Redwood Bowl; Arcata, CA	W 52–49	5,628
October 21	Western Oregon	No. 22	Redwood Bowl; Arcata, CA	W 42–32	1,855
October 28	at Simon Fraser	No. 18	Terry Fox Field; Burnaby, BC	W 47–7	275
November 4	Western State (CO)*	No. 17		W 48–3	489
November 11	No. 7 Central Washington	No. 16	Redwood Bowl; Arcata, CA	L 28–42	5,467
*Non-conference game; ^{†}Homecoming; Rankings from AFCA Poll released prior to the game
