= 2009 Humboldt State Lumberjacks football team =

American college football season

2009 Humboldt State Lumberjacks football
- Conference: Great Northwest Athletic Conference
- Record: 5–5 (1–5 GNAC)
- Head coach: Rob Smith (2nd season)
- Offensive coordinator: Eric Tripp (2nd season)
- Defensive coordinator: Shay McClure (4th season)
- Home stadium: Redwood Bowl

2009 Great Northwest Athletic Conference football standings
| | Conf. | | | Overall |
| Team | W | | L | W | | L |
|---|---|---|---|---|---|---|
| No. 3 Central Washington $^ | 6 | – | 0 | 12 | – | 1 |
| Western Oregon | 3 | – | 3 | 5 | – | 5 |
| Dixie State | 2 | – | 4 | 4 | – | 7 |
| Humboldt State | 1 | – | 5 | 5 | – | 5 |
$ – Conference champion; ^ – NCAA Division II playoff participant; Rankings from AFCA poll

The 2009 Humboldt State Lumberjacks football team represented Humboldt State University—now known as California State Polytechnic University, Humboldt—as a member of the Great Northwest Athletic Conference (GNAC) during the 2009 NCAA Division II football season. Led by second-year head coach Rob Smith, the Lumberjacks compiled an overall record of 5–5 with a mark of 1–5 in conference play, placing last out of four teams in the GNAC. The team outscored its opponents 276 to 220 for the season. Humboldt State played home games at the Redwood Bowl in Arcata, California.

== Schedule ==
| Date | Opponent | Site | Result | Attendance |
|---|---|---|---|---|
| September 5 | at Adams State* | Rex Stadium; Alamosa, CO | W 36–24 | 2,047 |
| September 12 | Western Oregon | Redwood Bowl; Arcata, CA | L 16–17 | 4,801 |
| September 19 | at Menlo* | Connor Field; Atherton, CA | W 44–16 | 500 |
| September 26 | at Dixie State | Hansen Stadium; St. George, UT | L 20–24 | 3,394 |
| October 3 | at Azusa Pacific* | Cougar Athletic Stadium; Azusa, CA | W 31–10 | 2,009 |
| October 10 | No. 4 Central Washington | Redwood Bowl; Arcata, CA | L 27–34 | 3,309 |
| October 17 | Southern Oregon*^{†} | Redwood Bowl; Arcata, CA | W 34–3 | 4,211 |
| October 24 | at No. 2 Central Washington | Tomlinson Stadium; Ellensburg, WA | L 7–38 | 5,410 |
| October 31 | at Western Oregon | McArthur Field; Monmouth, OR | L 28–31 | 2,200 |
| November 7 | Dixie State | Redwood Bowl; Arcata, CA | W 33–23 | 2,850 |
*Non-conference game; ^{†}Homecoming; Rankings from AFCA Poll released prior to the game
