= 2008 Humboldt State Lumberjacks football team =

American college football season

2008 Humboldt State Lumberjacks football
- Conference: Great Northwest Athletic Conference
- Record: 2–9 (0–8 GNAC)
- Head coach: Rob Smith (1st season)
- Offensive coordinator: Eric Tripp (1st season)
- Defensive coordinator: Shay McClure (3rd season)
- Home stadium: Redwood Bowl

2008 Great Northwest Athletic Conference football standings
	Conf.			Overall
Team	W		L	W		L
No. 13 Central Washington $^	8	–	0	10	–	2
Western Oregon	5	–	3	7	–	4
Western Washington #	5	–	3	6	–	5
Dixie State	2	–	6	4	–	7
Humboldt State	0	–	8	2	–	9
$ – Conference champion; ^ – NCAA Division II playoff participant; # – Dixie Rotary Bowl participant; Rankings from AFCA poll

The 2008 Humboldt State Lumberjacks football team represented Humboldt State University—now known as California State Polytechnic University, Humboldt—as a member of the Great Northwest Athletic Conference (GNAC) during the 2008 NCAA Division II football season. Led by first-year head coach Rob Smith, the Lumberjacks compiled an overall record of 2–9 with a mark of 0–8 in conference play, placing last out of five teams in the GNAC. The team was outscored by its opponents 357 to 170 for the season. Humboldt State played home games at the Redwood Bowl in Arcata, California.

Humboldt State completed as an NCAA Division II independent in 2006 and 2007, but returned to GNAC competition in 2008 when the conference resumed sponsorship of football. Each GNAC member played each of its conference foes twice during the season (home and away) instead of just once.

== Schedule ==
Date	Opponent	Site	Result	Attendance	Source
August 30	at Sacramento State*	Hornet Stadium; Sacramento, CA	L 13–45	10,172	
September 6	at Southern Oregon*	Fuller Field; Ashland, OR	W 15–14	1,037	
September 13	Western Washington	Redwood Bowl; Arcata, CA	L 14–30	4,208	
September 20	at No. 8 Central Washington	Tomlinson Stadium; Ellensburg, WA	L 10–48	4,224	
September 27	Western Oregon	Redwood Bowl; Arcata, CA	L 28–44	2,200	
October 4	Azusa Pacific*^{†}	Redwood Bowl; Arcata, CA	W 24–17	3,100	
October 11	at Dixie State	Hansen Stadium; St. George, UT	L 6–16	2,946	
October 18	No. 11 Central Washington	Redwood Bowl; Arcata, CA	L 14–34	2,200	
October 25	at Western Washington	Civic Stadium; Bellingham, WA	L 20–56	2,150	
November 1	at Western Oregon	McArthur Field; Monmouth, OR	L 10–34		
November 8	Dixie State	Redwood Bowl; Arcata, CA	L 15–19	1,083	
*Non-conference game; ^{†}Homecoming; Rankings from AFCA Poll released prior to the game
