= 2016 Humboldt State Lumberjacks football team =

American college football season

2016 Humboldt State Lumberjacks football
- Conference: Great Northwest Athletic Conference
- Record: 6–5 (3–5 GNAC)
- Head coach: Rob Smith (9th season)
- Home stadium: Redwood Bowl

2016 Great Northwest Athletic Conference football standings
| | Conf. | | | Overall |
| Team | W | | L | W | | L |
|---|---|---|---|---|---|---|
| No. 25 Azusa Pacific $^ | 8 | – | 0 | 9 | – | 3 |
| Central Washington | 6 | – | 2 | 7 | – | 3 |
| Humboldt State | 3 | – | 5 | 6 | – | 5 |
| Western Oregon | 3 | – | 5 | 4 | – | 6 |
| Simon Fraser | 0 | – | 8 | 0 | – | 10 |
$ – Conference champion; ^ – NCAA Division II playoff participant; Rankings from AFCA Poll

The 2016 Humboldt State Lumberjacks football team represented Humboldt State University—now known as California State Polytechnic University, Humboldt—as a member of the Great Northwest Athletic Conference (GNAC) during the 2016 NCAA Division II football season. Led by ninth-year head coach Rob Smith, the Lumberjacks compiled an overall record of 6–5 with a mark of 3–5 in conference play, tying for third place in the GNAC. The team outscored its opponents 333 to 321 for the season. Humboldt State played home games at the Redwood Bowl in Arcata, California.

== Schedule ==
| Date | Opponent | Rank | Site | Result | Attendance |
|---|---|---|---|---|---|
| September 1 | at Carson–Newman* | No. 13 | Burke–Tarr Stadium; Jefferson City, TN | W 52–45 | 3,084 |
| September 10 | Azusa Pacific | No. 13 | Redwood Bowl; Arcata, CA | L 27–38 | 7,311 |
| September 17 | at Simon Fraser | No. 25 | Terry Fox Field; Burnaby, BC | W 56–24 | 850 |
| September 24 | Western Oregon | No. 24 | Redwood Bowl; Arcata, CA | L 42–48 | 3,862 |
| October 1 | at Chadron State* | | Elliott Field at Don Beebe Stadium; Chadron, NE | W 31–27 | 1,082 |
| October 8 | Central Washington^{†} | | Redwood Bowl; Arcata, CA | L 17–42 | 6,421 |
| October 15 | at No. 19 Azusa Pacific | | Citrus Stadium; Azusa, CA | L 13–45 | 4,816 |
| October 22 | at Western Oregon | | McArthur Field; Monmouth, OR | W 42–37 | 2,887 |
| October 29 | Simon Fraser | | Redwood Bowl; Arcata, CA | W 47–9 | 1,347 |
| November 5 | Western State (CO)* | | Redwood Bowl; Arcata, CA | W 28–14 | 1,065 |
| November 12 | at Central Washington | | Tomlinson Stadium; Ellensburg, WA | L 30–37 | 3,612 |
*Non-conference game; ^{†}Homecoming; Rankings from AFCA Poll released prior to the game
