= 2015 Humboldt State Lumberjacks football team =

American college football season

2015 Humboldt State Lumberjacks football

NCAA Division II Second Round, L 7–54 at Northwest Missouri State
- Conference: Great Northwest Athletic Conference

Ranking
- AFCA: No. 16
- Record: 10–2 (6–0 GNAC)
- Head coach: Rob Smith (8th season)
- Offensive coordinator: Eric Tripp (8th season)
- Home stadium: Redwood Bowl

2015 Great Northwest Athletic Conference football standings
	Conf.			Overall
Team	W		L	W		L
No. 16 Humboldt State $^	6	–	0	10	–	2
Western Oregon	5	–	1	7	–	4
Azusa Pacific	3	–	3	6	–	4
Central Washington	3	–	3	5	–	5
South Dakota Mines	2	–	4	6	–	5
Dixie State	2	–	4	3	–	7
Simon Fraser	0	–	6	0	–	9
$ – Conference champion; ^ – NCAA Division II playoff participant; Rankings from AFCA Poll

The 2015 Humboldt State Lumberjacks football team represented Humboldt State University—now known as California State Polytechnic University, Humboldt—as a member of the Great Northwest Athletic Conference (GNAC) during the 2015 NCAA Division II football season. Led by eighth-year head coach Rob Smith, the Lumberjacks compiled an overall record of 10–2 with a mark of 6–0 in conference play, winning the GNAC title. Humboldt State was invited to play in the postseason for the first time since 1968. The Lumberjacks advanced to the NCAA Division II football championship playoffs, defeating Augustana of South Dakota in the first round before losing to the eventual national champion, Northwest Missouri State, in the second round. Humboldt State was ranked No. 16 in the final AFCA poll. The team outscored its opponents 468 to 238 for 2015 season, with an average score of 45–14 in the ten wins. Humboldt State played home games at the Redwood Bowl in Arcata, California.

== Schedule ==
Date	Time	Opponent	Rank	Site	Result	Attendance
September 5	6:00 p.m.	Western Oregon		Redwood Bowl; Arcata, CA	W 29–20	6,491
September 12	6:00 p.m.	at No. 17 Azusa Pacific*		Cougar Athletic Stadium; Azusa, CA	W 62–41	5,582
September 19	6:00 p.m.	Dixie State*	No. 25	Redwood Bowl; Arcata, CA	W 66–7	5,803
October 3	4:00 p.m.	at South Dakota Mines	No. 16	O'Harra Stadium; Rapid City, SD	W 59–10	1,519
October 10	6:00 p.m.	Azusa Pacific^{†}	No. 11	Redwood Bowl; Arcata, CA	W 34–16	8,129
October 17	6:00 p.m.	at No. 11 Midwestern State (TX)*	No. 10	Memorial Stadium; Wichita Falls, TX	L 10–35	8,129
October 24	1:00 p.m.	at Central Washington	No. 16	Tomlinson Stadium; Ellensburg, WA	W 42–17	4,642
October 31	1:00 p.m.	Simon Fraser	No. 15	Redwood Bowl; Arcata, CA	W 57–0	5,102
November 7	5:00 p.m.	at Dixie State	No. 13	Hansen Stadium; St. George, UT	W 57–14	2,058
November 14	1:00 p.m.	at Western Oregon*	No. 12	McArthur Field; Monmouth, OR	W 29–13	2,323
November 21	1:00 p.m.	No. 24 Augustana (SD)*	No. 11	Redwood Bowl; Arcata, CA (NCAA Division II First Round)	W 45–31	4,113
November 28	11:00 a.m.	at No. 1 Northwest Missouri State*	No. 11	Bearcat Stadium; Maryville, MO (NCAA Division II Second Round)	L 7–54	4,160
*Non-conference game; ^{†}Homecoming; Rankings from AFCA Poll released prior to the game; All times are in Pacific time
