= Shrum Bowl =

Canadian university football rivalry

- SFU UBC
- Sport: Canadian football
- First meeting: October 16, 1967; SFU 32, UBC 13
- Latest meeting: December 2, 2022; UBC 18, SFU 17

Statistics
- Total meetings: 34
- All-time series: SFU: 17–16–1; SFU, 5–4–1 @ Empire Stadium; SFU, 7–5 @ SFU; UBC, 7–5 @ UBC
- Largest victory: SFU: 61–6 (1970)
- Longest win streak: UBC, 4 (1981–1988), (2004–2007); SFU, 3 (1989–1991), (2001–2003), (2008–2010)
- Current win streak: UBC, 1 (2022–present)

The Shrum Bowl was a university rivalry game played between the gridiron football teams of the University of British Columbia (UBC) Thunderbirds and the Simon Fraser University (SFU) Red Leafs. The game was named after Gordon Shrum who was a professor and later a dean at UBC from 1925 to 1961 and served as the first chancellor of SFU from 1964 to 1968. It was a cross-town rivalry with UBC being located in the Point Grey campus lands just west of Vancouver, British Columbia, and SFU located approximately 30 kilometres away in Burnaby, British Columbia.

The University of British Columbia had been the final champion prior to the disbandment of the Simon Fraser University gridiron football program in 2023, though Simon Fraser led in the series with an all-time record of 17–16–1. In the 55-year history of the rivalry game, the Shrum Bowl had been played 34 times.

== History ==
The first-ever Shrum Bowl game was played on October 16, 1967, at Empire Stadium and it was also the first-ever football game to be played between the two schools. The UBC Thunderbirds played in the Canadian Intercollegiate Athletic Union (CIAU) while SFU played against American colleges until formally joining the American-based National Association of Intercollegiate Athletics (NAIA) in 1969, meaning that Shrum Bowls were played as exhibition games. In the first five years it was played, SFU typically dominated the games, posting a 4–0–1 record and outscoring UBC 168–32. While all games were played on neutral ground at Empire stadium, home to the BC Lions, the games were played with American rules when UBC was used to playing Canadian rules. Because of the heavily skewed losses, declining fan interest, and the CWUAA's objections to SFU granting aid to student athletes, the games were temporarily discontinued.

The game was revived in 1978 after both schools issued a joint statement on October 27 of that year that the game would be played after the CIAU season with all proceeds going to the United Way of Canada and drew a record 14,600. Shrum Bowl VI was played at Empire Stadium and under Canadian rules for the first time, after UBC argued that since the game was to be played on Canadian soil, it should be played as such. With the Thunderbirds as national championship contenders and games being played under their rules, the Shrum Bowl became tilted in UBC's favour. UBC would win four of the next five games, including the 1982 game that was played following the program's first Vanier Cup victory. Despite the popularity of the games, which had 9000 fans witness the 1982 edition, the Shrum Bowl was again put on hiatus due to scheduling difficulties between the schools' respective leagues.

On January 13, 1987, history repeated itself as UBC and SFU jointly announced that the Shrum Bowl would be revived with a five-year commitment from the CIAU. The agreement would see UBC having a bye-week on the second weekend of September for five years, ensuring that scheduling the game could be easily accomplished year-to-year. The 11th Shrum Bowl would be played at a team's home stadium for the first time in the game's history, at Swangard Stadium in Burnaby and once again under American rules. In 1985, Dr. Gordon Shrum died during the game's second hiatus, but his son spoke at the January press conference stating that nothing would have made his father happier than to have this game revived. UBC won the 1987 and 1988 games en route to their first ever lead in the series, 6–5–1, including a four-game winning streak, which has proved to be the longest in the history of the game. The games were now being played at alternating locations as the 1988 game was played at UBC's Thunderbird Stadium with 8,600 in attendance. The 1991 game drew the largest crowd of that era with an estimated 10,500 showing up to a temporarily expanded Swangard Stadium.

The Shrum Bowl was played on the second weekend of September from 1987 to 1993 as was originally intended, but the game ran into problems in 1994. In 1993, UBC played two opponents in one week, which proved to be extremely strenuous on the players and coaches. Since the team was not prepared to do that again, the September 10, 1994 match-up was cancelled. The Shrum Bowl resumed play in 1995 under a new stipulation: every time UBC hosts, the game would be played under Canadian rules and every time SFU hosts, it would be played under American rules. While SFU opposed the new rule, since the game was their first of the season and had to practice with different rules, both schools were simply satisfied that the game was back.

The format of alternating venues and rules was kept until 2001, which would be SFU's last in the NAIA. In 2002, SFU made the switch to the Canadian Interuniversity Sport league (formerly CIAU), which meant that they would not only be playing Canadian rules, but they would also be in the same conference as UBC. This also meant that the Shrum Bowl would count for two points in the standings as opposed to being an exhibition game and the teams would be playing two games against each other each year instead of one. From 2002 to 2006, the Shrum Bowl was the first match-up of the season between the two teams while the second was typically played midweek following Thanksgiving. Since this was often strenuous on the teams having such short weeks, the CIS moved the other regular season match-up to the beginning of the season in 2007 with the Shrum Bowl becoming the second game played between UBC and SFU.

The 2009 season marked the last game to be played while the two teams were both in the CIS. In 2010, SFU made the successful transfer to the National Collegiate Athletic Association Division II's Great Northwest Athletic Conference. Once again, the game would be played with alternating rules. The Shrum Bowl was played at Thunderbird Stadium in 2010, but could not be played in 2011 due to scheduling conflicts for both teams. SFU had no mid-season byes and UBC was reluctant to play at the beginning or end of the season.

On June 23, 2022, it was announced that a two-year agreement had been reached and the 34th edition of the game would be played on December 2, 2022, after both teams had finished their leagues' schedules. SFU hosted in 2022 under American rules and UBC will host in 2023 under Canadian rules. The 34th edition of the Shrum Bowl was played in front of a sellout crowd of 2,922 fans at Terry Fox Field on December 2, 2022, and was won 18–17 by UBC. However, on April 4, 2023, Simon Fraser announced that due to being dropped as an affiliate member by the Lone Star Conference, where the Red Leafs housed their football program, it will be ending varsity football as a sport effective immediately, making this the final time the rivalry game was played.

== Attempted revivals ==
=== 2012 attempt ===
After 2011 resulted in no game being played between the two schools, representatives from both UBC and SFU had stated that they would make greater efforts to have a Shrum Bowl match played in 2012, but there was no result. Simon Fraser had no mid-season bye weeks, while UBC was reluctant to play at the end of their season because it would conflict with possible playoff games.

UBC's director of athletics and recreation at the time, Bob Philip, suggested that the Thunderbirds could request to move a CIS game to their bye week in order to align their schedule with SFU's. He further acknowledged that SFU would have less bargaining power in the NCAA after having been full-time members for only two years. It was also suggested that the game could be played in January like American college bowl games, but the focus is on playing during the regular football season. While former SFU head coach Dave Johnson suggested that they could play in a non-conference game at the beginning of the season, (former) UBC head coach Shawn Olson was against the idea because it would be treated like a preseason game with many non-starters playing.

=== 2014, 2015 attempts ===
In the summer of 2014, an unofficial agreement on a framework that would have allowed the game to be played every season was reported on in The Province. UBC would require their Canada West schedule to begin the first weekend after Labour Day, allowing the Shrum Bowl to function as the season-opener for both teams over the Labour Day weekend.

“I would be very surprised that, if UBC has an opening on the Labour Day weekend, that we don’t play the game,” (now former) Simon Fraser athletic director Milt Richards told The Province. Looking ahead to 2015 Richards said, “I think we have an agreement in principle to play the game. We’ve agreed that if the stars align, we’re going to do this thing.”

With new head coaches Kelly Bates and Blake Nill, the opportunity for a 2016 Shrum Bowl seemed promising. However, scheduling challenges remained. For Simon Fraser to play a U Sports team, they would need to apply for a waiver from the NCAA to play for a special post-season bowl game. By doing so, SFU would relinquish participation in the D2 playoffs, should they qualify. The earliest UBC could play would be the first week of December, which is the week after Vanier Cup. Ultimately, a game was not scheduled.

=== 2020 Discussion ===
In the spring of 2020, there was reportedly renewed interest in reviving the Shrum Bowl game. The athletic directors for both universities, Kavie Toor of UBC and Theresa Hanson of SFU, were both in favour of reinstating the game to invigorate the student body and promote their athletics' brands. Initially, the discussion was for the 2020 season, but due to the COVID-19 pandemic in Canada, both programs had their 2020 seasons cancelled. While the scheduling restrictions remain, the cancellation of league games had generated the renewed interest in scheduling another Shrum Bowl game in the future.

== Game results ==
The following is a list of results from all Shrum Bowl meetings between the Simon Fraser Clan and UBC Thunderbirds from their first meeting on October 16, 1967, to the present:

‡	Match result counted towards CWUAA standings.

Game	Date	Winner	Result	Loser	Location	Rules	Record
1	October 16, 1967	Simon Fraser Clan	32–13	UBC Thunderbirds	Empire Stadium	American	SFU 1–0
2	October 21, 1968	Simon Fraser Clan	27–7	UBC Thunderbirds	Empire Stadium	American	SFU 2–0
3	October 20, 1969	Tie	6–6	Tie	Empire Stadium	American	SFU 2–0–1
4	October 31, 1970	Simon Fraser Clan	61–6	UBC Thunderbirds	Empire Stadium	American	SFU 3–0–1
5	November 13, 1971	Simon Fraser Clan	42–0	UBC Thunderbirds	Empire Stadium	Canadian	SFU 4–0–1
6	November 25, 1978	UBC Thunderbirds	22–14	Simon Fraser Clan	Empire Stadium	Canadian	SFU 4–1–1
7	October 19, 1979	UBC Thunderbirds	4–3	Simon Fraser Clan	Empire Stadium	Canadian	SFU 4–2–1
8	October 17, 1980	Simon Fraser Clan	30–3	UBC Thunderbirds	Empire Stadium	Canadian	SFU 5–2–1
9	November 28, 1981	UBC Thunderbirds	33–1	Simon Fraser Clan	Empire Stadium	Canadian	SFU 5–3–1
10	November 27, 1982	UBC Thunderbirds	19–8	Simon Fraser Clan	Empire Stadium	Canadian	SFU 5–4–1
11	September 12, 1987	UBC Thunderbirds	14–0	Simon Fraser Clan	Swangard Stadium	American	Tie 5–5–1
12	September 10, 1988	UBC Thunderbirds	25–16	Simon Fraser Clan	Thunderbird Stadium	American	UBC 6–5–1
13	September 9, 1989	Simon Fraser Clan	41–27	UBC Thunderbirds	Swangard Stadium	American	Tie 6–6–1
14	September 8, 1990	Simon Fraser Clan	36–13	UBC Thunderbirds	Thunderbird Stadium	American	SFU 7–6–1
15	September 15, 1991	Simon Fraser Clan	20–17	UBC Thunderbirds	Swangard Stadium	American	SFU 8–6–1
16	September 12, 1992	UBC Thunderbirds	39–20	Simon Fraser Clan	Thunderbird Stadium	American	SFU 8–7–1
17	September 12, 1993	UBC Thunderbirds	20–17	Simon Fraser Clan	Swangard Stadium	American	Tie 8–8–1
–	September 10, 1994	Cancelled			Thunderbird Stadium	American	Tie 8–8–1
18	September 9, 1995	UBC Thunderbirds	29–7	Simon Fraser Clan	Thunderbird Stadium	American	UBC 9–8–1
19	September 13, 1996	Simon Fraser Clan	25–15	UBC Thunderbirds	Thunderbird Stadium	Canadian	Tie 9–9–1
20	October 4, 1997	Simon Fraser Clan	17–6	UBC Thunderbirds	Swangard Stadium	American	SFU 10–9–1
21	September 25, 1998	UBC Thunderbirds	11–9	Simon Fraser Clan	Thunderbird Stadium	Canadian	Tie 10–10–1
22	October 2, 1999	Simon Fraser Clan	41–14	UBC Thunderbirds	Swangard Stadium	American	SFU 11–10–1
23	October 6, 2000	UBC Thunderbirds	41–28	Simon Fraser Clan	Thunderbird Stadium	Canadian	Tie 11–11–1
24	October 4, 2001	Simon Fraser Clan	38–13	UBC Thunderbirds	Swangard Stadium	American	SFU 12–11–1
25	October 4, 2002 ‡	Simon Fraser Clan	22–12	UBC Thunderbirds	Thunderbird Stadium	Canadian	SFU 13–11–1
26	October 3, 2003 ‡	Simon Fraser Clan	38–12	UBC Thunderbirds	Swangard Stadium	Canadian	SFU 14–11–1
27	October 8, 2004 ‡	UBC Thunderbirds	42–24	Simon Fraser Clan	Thunderbird Stadium	Canadian	SFU 14–12–1
28	October 6, 2005 ‡	UBC Thunderbirds	40–33 (OT)	Simon Fraser Clan	Swangard Stadium	Canadian	SFU 14–13–1
29	October 7, 2006 ‡	UBC Thunderbirds	41–6	Simon Fraser Clan	Thunderbird Stadium	Canadian	Tie 14–14–1
30	October 6, 2007 ‡	UBC Thunderbirds	31–2	Simon Fraser Clan	Terry Fox Field	Canadian	UBC 15–14–1
31	October 9, 2008 ‡	Simon Fraser Clan	20–19	UBC Thunderbirds	Thunderbird Stadium	Canadian	Tie 15–15–1
32	October 17, 2009 ‡	Simon Fraser Clan	30–1	UBC Thunderbirds	Terry Fox Field	Canadian	SFU 16–15–1
33	October 8, 2010	Simon Fraser Clan	27–20	UBC Thunderbirds	Thunderbird Stadium	Canadian	SFU 17–15–1
34	December 2, 2022	UBC Thunderbirds	18–17	Simon Fraser Red Leafs	Terry Fox Field	American	SFU 17–16–1
–	December 1, 2023	Cancelled			Not announced	Canadian	SFU 17–16–1
