= Alex Cappa =

American football player (born 1995)

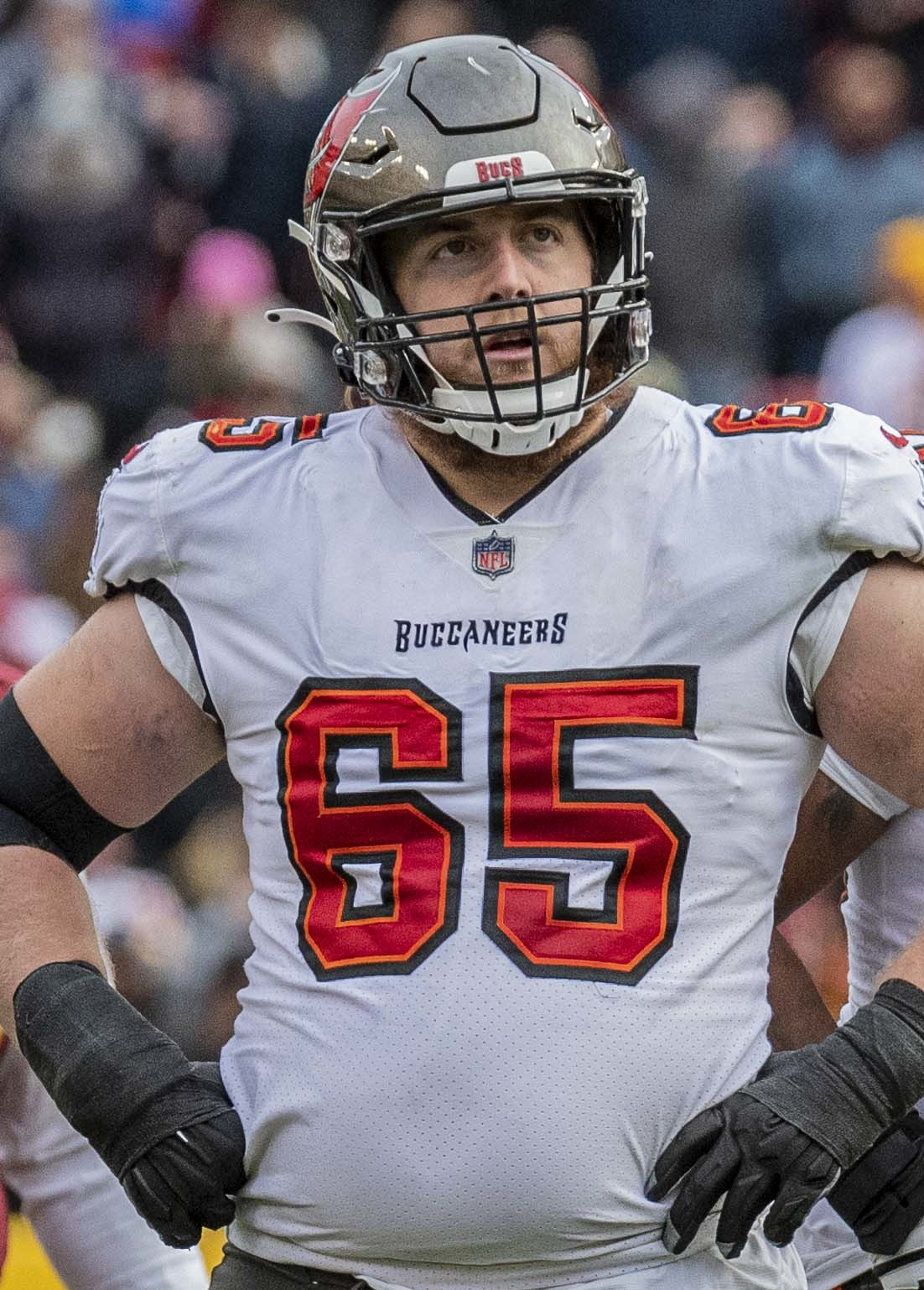
- Cappa with the Tampa Bay Buccaneers in 2021

Profile
- Position: Guard

Personal information
- Born: January 27, 1995 (age 31); Dublin, California, U.S.
- Listed height: 6 ft 6 in (1.98 m)
- Listed weight: 312 lb (142 kg)

Career information
- High school: Dublin
- College: Humboldt State (2013–2017)
- NFL draft: 2018: 3rd round, 94th overall pick

Career history
- Tampa Bay Buccaneers (2018–2021); Cincinnati Bengals (2022–2024); Las Vegas Raiders (2025)

Awards and highlights
- Super Bowl champion (LV)

Career NFL statistics as of 2025
- Games played: 119
- Games started: 104
- Stats at Pro Football Reference

Alex Cappa (born January 27, 1995) is an American professional football guard. He played college football for the Humboldt State Lumberjacks and was selected by the Tampa Bay Buccaneers in the third round of the 2018 NFL draft.

== College career ==
During Cappa's time at Humboldt State University (now Cal Poly Humboldt), he was named the Great Northwest Athletic Conference (GNAC) offensive lineman of the year for 4 years in a row. He was also named to the First-team GNAC every year of his playing career. Following his senior season, Cappa was invited to the 2018 Senior Bowl.

== Professional career ==
=== Pre-draft ===
External videos
- Mike Mayock reviews Cappa's game tape
- Alex Cappa's NFL Combine Workout

On November 27, 2017, Cappa accepted his invitation to play in the Senior Bowl. He impressed scouts and NFL analysts with a strong week of practice before the Senior Bowl and helped solidify his draft stock. On January 27, 2018, Cappa played in the 2018 Reese's Senior Bowl and was part of Houston Texans head coach Bill O'Brien's South team that won 45–16 to Denver Broncos head coach Vance Joseph's North team.

Pre-draft measurables
Height	Weight	Arm length	Hand span	40-yard dash	10-yard split	20-yard split	20-yard shuttle	Three-cone drill	Vertical jump	Broad jump	Bench press
6 ft 5 3/4 in (1.97 m)	305 lb (138 kg)	32 5/8 in (0.83 m)	9 1/4 in (0.23 m)	5.39 s	1.87 s	3.10 s	4.84 s	8.04 s	26.5 in (0.67 m)	8 ft 1 in (2.46 m)	24 reps
All values from NFL Combine

He attended the NFL Scouting Combine in Indianapolis and completed all of the combine and positional drills. At the conclusion of the pre-draft process, Cappa was projected to be a fifth round pick by the majority of NFL draft experts and scouts. He was ranked as the 14th best offensive tackle prospect in the draft by DraftScout.com and was ranked the 15th best offensive tackle by Scouts Inc.

=== Tampa Bay Buccaneers ===
==== 2018 ====
The Tampa Bay Buccaneers selected Cappa in the third round with the 94th overall pick in the 2018 NFL draft. The Buccaneers traded their fourth (102nd overall) and sixth round picks (180th overall) in the 2018 NFL Draft to the Minnesota Vikings in exchange for the Vikings' third round pick to draft Cappa. Cappa was the 12th offensive tackle drafted in 2018. He became Humboldt State's highest draft selection in school history. He also holds the distinction of being Humboldt State's 11th player drafted and the first player selected in the NFL draft since Freeman Baysinger in 1992, as well as being the final player drafted from Humboldt State as the school discontinued its football program after 2018.

External videos
- Buccaneers draft Alex Cappa 94th overall

On May 13, 2018, the Tampa Bay Buccaneers signed Cappa to a four-year, $3.36 million contract that includes a signing bonus of $793,704. As a rookie, Cappa appeared in six games, all at the end of the regular season.

==== 2019 ====
Cappa made his first career start in the 2019 regular season opener against the San Francisco 49ers. In a game against the New Orleans Saints on October 6, 2019, Cappa suffered a broken left arm but did not miss a snap after sustaining the injury in the second quarter.

==== 2020 ====
During the COVID-19 outbreak Cappa was involved with supporting local restaurants and businesses.

On January 9, 2021, in the Wild Card Round against the Washington Football Team, Cappa suffered a fractured ankle. On January 15, 2021, Cappa was placed on injured reserve due to the injury. The Buccaneers went on to win Super Bowl LV.

==== 2021 ====
Cappa started all 19 games, regular season and playoffs, and was the only player to be on the field for all 1328 offensive snaps. He had his best season in 2021, helping the Buccaneers allow only 23 sacks and a 3.15% sacks per pass play rate, with both stats leading the league. In addition, the Buccaneers averaged 4.89 yards per carry while running over right guard.

=== Cincinnati Bengals ===
==== 2022 ====
Cappa signed a four-year, $35 million contract with the Cincinnati Bengals on March 18, 2022. Cappa was the starting right guard in all 17 regular season games for Cincinnati in 2022, helping the team to a 12–4 record, but he incurred an ankle injury during the finale against the Baltimore Ravens. Cappa did not return for the postseason run, in which the Bengals lost the AFC Championship game to the Kansas City Chiefs.

==== 2023 ====
Cappa returned as the starting right guard for the 2023 season. He started all 17 games in the season.

==== 2024 ====
Cappa struggled as the starting guard through all 17 games in 2024, finishing last among NFL guards in pressures (51), hurries (36), and sacks allowed (8, tied with Shaq Mason).

On March 3, 2025, Cappa was released by the Bengals.

=== Las Vegas Raiders ===
On March 5, 2025, Cappa signed a two-year, $11 million contract with the Las Vegas Raiders.

On March 6, 2026, the Raiders released Cappa.
