= 2018 Dixie State Trailblazers football team =

American college football season

2018 Dixie State Trailblazers football
- Conference: Rocky Mountain Athletic Conference
- Record: 7–4 (7–3 RMAC)
- Head coach: Shay McClure (3rd season)
- Offensive coordinator: Blake Rolan (1st season)
- Defensive coordinator: Willie Mack Garza (1st season)
- Home stadium: Greater Zion Stadium

2018 Rocky Mountain Athletic Conference football standings
| | Conf. | | | Overall |
| Team | W | | L | W | | L |
|---|---|---|---|---|---|---|
| No. 7 CSU Pueblo +^ | 9 | – | 1 | 11 | – | 2 |
| No. 18 Colorado Mines +^ | 9 | – | 1 | 10 | – | 2 |
| Chadron State | 7 | – | 3 | 7 | – | 3 |
| Dixie State | 7 | – | 3 | 7 | – | 4 |
| Colorado Mesa | 6 | – | 4 | 7 | – | 4 |
| South Dakota Mines | 4 | – | 6 | 5 | – | 6 |
| Adams State | 4 | – | 6 | 4 | – | 7 |
| New Mexico Highlands | 4 | – | 6 | 4 | – | 7 |
| Black Hills State | 2 | – | 8 | 3 | – | 8 |
| Western Colorado | 2 | – | 8 | 2 | – | 9 |
| Fort Lewis | 1 | – | 9 | 1 | – | 9 |
+ – Conference co-champions; ^ – NCAA Division II playoff participant; Rankings from AFCA Poll

The 2018 Dixie State Trailblazers football team represented Dixie State University (now Utah Tech University) in the 2018 NCAA Division II football season. They were led by third-year head coach Shay McClure and played their home games at Greater Zion Stadium in St. George, Utah as a member of the Rocky Mountain Athletic Conference.

== Schedule ==
| Date | Time | Opponent | Site | TV | Result | Attendance |
|---|---|---|---|---|---|---|
| September 1 | 6:00 p.m. | at No. 14 Colorado State–Pueblo | DeRose ThunderBowl; Pueblo, CO | Radio Dixie 91.3 | L 14–56 | 6,499 |
| September 8 | 6:00 p.m. | Fort Lewis | Trailblazer Stadium; St. George, UT | CEC-TV/Radio Dixie 91.3 | W 31–3 | 5,498 |
| September 15 | 6:00 p.m. | New Mexico Highlands | Trailblazer Stadium; St. George, UT | | W 28–23 | 2,251 |
| September 22 | 6:00 p.m. | South Dakota Mines | Trailblazer Stadium; St. George, UT | CEC-TV/Radio Dixie 91.3 | W 51–47 | 3,176 |
| September 29 | 1:00 p.m. | at Black Hills State | Lyle Hare Stadium; Spearfish, SD | CEC-TV/Radio Dixie 91.3 | W 41–38 | 1,147 |
| October 6 | 5:00 p.m. | at No. 2 Grand Valley State* | Lubbers Stadium; Allendale, MI | ESPN3 | L 14–35 | 10,763 |
| October 13 | 1:00 p.m. | Western Colorado | Trailblazer Stadium; St. George, UT | CEC-TV/Radio Dixie 91.3 | W 17–10 | 2,303 |
| October 20 | 12:00 p.m. | at Chadron State | Elliott Field; Chadron, NE | Radio Dixie 91.3 | L 18–30 | 2,002 |
| October 27 | 7:00 p.m. | at Colorado Mesa | Stocker Stadium; Grand Junction, CO | Radio Dixie 91.3 | L 24–45 | 2,582 |
| November 3 | 12:00 p.m. | No. 6 Colorado Mines^{†} | Trailblazer Stadium; St. George, UT | CEC-TV/ESPN Radio | W 52–45 | 4,274 |
| November 10 | 1:00 p.m. | at Adams State | Rex Stadium; Alamosa, CO | CEC-TV/Radio Dixie 91.3 | W 52–10 | 1,500 |
*Non-conference game; ^{†}Homecoming; Rankings from AFCA Coaches Poll released prior to the game; All times are in Mountain time
