= Rob Smith (American football, born 1957) =

American football player and coach (born 1957)

Biographical details
- Education: Washington (1981)

Playing career
- 1977–1980: Washington

Coaching career (HC unless noted)
- 1989–2005: Western Washington
- 2008–2017: Humboldt State

Head coaching record
- Overall: 172–106–1
- Tournaments: 4–4 (NAIA D-II playoffs); 1–2 (NCAA D-II playoffs)

Accomplishments and honors

Championships
- 3 CFA (1996, 1999–2000); 4 GNAC (2001, 2003, 2011, 2015); 1 CFA Mount Rainier Division (1995)

Robert Smith is an American former football coach. He served as the head football coach at Western Washington University from 1989 to 2005 and Humboldt State University in Humboldt, California from 2008 to 2017, compiling a career college football coaching record of 172–106–1.

== Head coaching record ==
Year	Team	Overall	Conference	Standing	Bowl/playoffs	AFCA^{#}
Western Washington Vikings (Columbia Football Association) (1989–1997)
1989	Western Washington	7–2	4–2	T–3rd (Mount Rainier)		
1990	Western Washington	3–6	1–5	T–5th (Mount Rainier)		
1991	Western Washington	5–3–1	4–2	3rd (Mount Rainier)		
1992	Western Washington	7–3	3–2	T–2nd (Mount Rainier)	L NAIA Division II First Round	
1993	Western Washington	6–3	3–2	3rd (Mount Rainier)		
1994	Western Washington	8–3	4–1	2nd (Mount Rainier)	L NAIA Division II Quarterfinal	
1995	Western Washington	9–1	5–0	1st (Mount Rainier)	L NAIA Division II First Round	
1996	Western Washington	11–2	4–1	1st	L NAIA Division II Championship	
1997	Western Washington	5–5	3–2	T–2nd		
1998	Western Washington	5–5	3–2	T–2nd		
1999	Western Washington	8–3	4–0	1st	L NCAA Division II First Round	
2000	Western Washington	7–3	3–1	1st		
Western Washington Vikings (Great Northwest Athletic Conference) (2001–2005)
2001	Western Washington	8–3	3–0	1st		23
2002	Western Washington	6–4	2–1	2nd		
2003	Western Washington	4–6	3–0	1st		
2004	Western Washington	6–4	3–3	T–2nd		
2005	Western Washington	4–6	3–3	2nd		
Western Washington:		109–62–1	55–27			
Humboldt State Lumberjacks (Great Northwest Athletic Conference) (2008–2017)
2008	Humboldt State	2–9	0–8	5th		
2009	Humboldt State	5–5	1–5	4th		
2010	Humboldt State	8–3	6–2	2nd		
2011	Humboldt State	9–1	7–1	1st		20
2012	Humboldt State	7–4	6–4	T–2nd		
2013	Humboldt State	0–11	0–10	6th		
2014	Humboldt State	8–2	4–2	T–2nd		
2015	Humboldt State	10–2	6–0	1st	L NCAA Division II Second Round	15
2016	Humboldt State	6–5	3–5	T–3rd		
2017	Humboldt State	8–2	6–2	2nd		
Humboldt State:		63–44	39–39			
Total:		172–106–1				
