= 2015 Little All-America college football team =

The 2015 Little All-America college football team is composed of college football players from Division II, III, and NAIA schools who were selected by the Associated Press (AP) as the best players at each position.

== First team ==
Position	Player	Team
Offense
Quarterback	Jason Vander Laan	Ferris State
Running back	Cameron McDondle	CSU Pueblo
Running back	Ja'Quan Gardner	Humboldt State
Wide receiver	Jon Schnaars	East Stroudsburg
Wide receiver	Jessie Ramos	Hardin-Simmons
Wide receiver	Jameson Parsons	St. Cloud State
Offensive line	Corey Tucker	Slippery Rock
Offensive line	Joe Ray	Lenoir-Rhyne
Offensive line	David Simmet	St. Thomas (MN)
Offensive line	Jordan Morgan	Kutztown
Offensive line	Colin Egan	Johns Hopkins
Defense
Defensive line	Alex Hoff	Linfield
Defensive line	Matthew Judon	Grand Valley State
Defensive line	Joshua Gordon	Minnesota State-Mankato
Defensive line	Collin Bevins	Northwest Missouri State
Linebacker	Brock Long	Fort Hays State
Linebacker	Jewell Ratlif	Tuskegee
Linebacker	Max Nacewicz	Springfield College (MA)
Defensive back	Solomon St. Pierre	Sioux Falls
Defensive back	Michael Jordan	Missouri Western State
Defensive back	Victor Bunce	Claremont-Mudd-Scripps
Defensive back	Carlo Thomas	Johnson C. Smith
Special Teams
Kicker	Austin Morton	Emporia State
Punter	Matt Klingler	Lindenwood
All-purpose	Dayton Winn	Hendrix

== See also ==
- 2015 College Football All-America Team
