= Richard Ashe (American football) =

American football player (born 1967)

No. 87, 69
- Position: Tight end

Personal information
- Born: March 14, 1967 (age 59); Chicago, Illinois, U.S.
- Listed height: 6 ft 4 in (1.93 m)
- Listed weight: 260 lb (118 kg)

Career information
- High school: Birmingham (Los Angeles, California)
- College: Humboldt State (1985–1998)
- NFL draft: 1989: undrafted

Career history
- Los Angeles Rams (1989–1990); New York Giants (1991)*; Atlanta Falcons (1992)*; Orlando Predators (1993)*; Arizona Rattlers (1993–1997)
- * Offseason or practice squad member only

Awards and highlights
- 2× ArenaBowl champion (1994, 1997); Second-team All-NCAC (1987)

Career NFL statistics
- Games played: 1
- Stats at Pro Football Reference
- Stats at ArenaFan.com

Richard Anthony Ashe (born March 14, 1967) is an American former professional football player who was a tight end for the Los Angeles Rams of the National Football League (NFL). He played college football for the Humboldt State Lumberjacks. Ashe also was a member of the Arizona Rattlers of the Arena Football League (AFL), where he won two ArenaBowls.

== Early life ==
Ashe was born on March 14, 1967, in Chicago, Illinois. He attended Birmingham High School in Los Angeles, California.

== College career ==
Ashe played college football for the Humboldt State Lumberjacks from 1985 to 1988 and was a four-year letterman. In 1987, he earned second-team All-NCAC honors. As a senior, Ashe started on both sides of the ball at tight end and linebacker. He had five receptions for 90 yards and 49 tackles and three sacks.

== Professional career ==
=== Los Angeles Rams ===
After going unselected in the 1989 NFL draft, Ashe signed with the Los Angeles Rams as an undrafted free agent. On September 5, he was waived and signed to the practice squad the following day. On March 9, 1990, Ashe re-signed with the Rams. He played in the season opener against the Green Bay Packers. On September 21, Ashe was placed on the injured reserve with a stress fracture in his left foot. On October 18, he was released and signed to the practice squad.

=== New York Giants ===
On March 30, 1991, Ashe was signed by the New York Giants. On August 26, he was waived by the team.

=== Atlanta Falcons ===
On March 23, 1992, Ashe signed with the Atlanta Falcons. On August 25, he was released.

=== Orlando Predators ===
In 1993, Ashe was signed by the Orlando Predators of the Arena Football League (AFL) but did not play in a game for the team.

=== Arizona Rattlers ===
On May 11, 1993, Ashe was traded to the Arizona Rattlers of the AFL for quarterback, Mike Hold. In his first game for the team, he was run over by a bison after the Rattlers scored a touchdown. The bison, named Harvey Wallbanger, ran across the field and struck Ashe, prompting him to yell at the bison's handler to get him away, although he was unhurt. He later said "it was the hardest hit he's taken in football".

In five seasons for the Rattlers, Ashe played in 53 games as an offensive and defensive lineman. He had 14 receptions for 152 yards and four touchdowns with four rushing yards. Ashe had 86 tackles, 8.5 sacks, 19 pass deflections, four forced fumbles, three fumble recoveries and a pick-six.
