= Dave Johnson (American football coach) =

American gridiron football player and coach

Playing career
- 1984–1987: Simon Fraser
- Position: Linebacker

Coaching career (HC unless noted)
- 1998: British Columbia (interim)
- 2007–2013: Simon Fraser
- 2015: Arizona Christian (DC/LB)

Head coaching record
- Overall: 18–44

Dave Johnson is an American football coach and former player. He served as the head football coach at Simon Fraser University in British Columbia from 2007 to 2013. Johnson oversaw the program's transition from the CIS to NCAA Division II. Under Johnson, the Clan would finish the 2008 season going 5–3, losing in the Hardy Trophy game; the 2012 team finished 5–6, which would be the program's best record while competing in the NCAA.

Johnson was drafted by the BC Lions of the Canadian Football League in the 6th round of the 1988 CFL draft.

== Head coaching record ==
Year	Team	Overall	Conference	Standing	Bowl/playoffs	CIS^{#}
Simon Fraser Clan (Canada West)) (2007–2009)
2007	Simon Fraser	0–8	0–8	7th		
2008	Simon Fraser	5–3	5–3	4th	L Hardy Trophy	8
2009	Simon Fraser	1–6	1–6	7th		
Simon Fraser Clan (Great Northwest Conference) (2010–2013)
2010	Simon Fraser	1–9	0–8	5th		
2011	Simon Fraser	3–7	2–6	4th		
2012	Simon Fraser	5–6	4–6	4th		
2013	Simon Fraser	3–7	3–7	5th		
Simon Fraser:		18–44	15–44			
Total:		18–44				
