= Taylor Boggs =

American football player (born 1987)

No. 57, 60, 64, 65
- Position: Center

Personal information
- Born: February 20, 1987 (age 39); Inland Empire, California, U.S.
- Listed height: 6 ft 3 in (1.91 m)
- Listed weight: 302 lb (137 kg)

Career information
- High school: Upland (CA)
- College: Humboldt State
- NFL draft: 2011: undrafted

Career history
- New York Jets (2011); Chicago Bears (2013–2014); Detroit Lions (2015); Arizona Cardinals (2016); Chicago Bears (2017)*
- * Offseason or practice squad member only

Career NFL statistics
- Games played: 24
- Games started: 2
- Stats at Pro Football Reference

Andrew Taylor Boggs (born February 20, 1987) is an American former professional football player who was a center in the National Football League (NFL). He played college football as a walk-on for the Humboldt State Lumberjacks. He was signed by the New York Jets as an undrafted free agent in 2011.

== College career ==
Boggs walked on to Humboldt State University's football team and was unsuccessful in making the roster. After a year Boggs gave it another try and went on to be a 3 time team captain and all conference/all American player.

== Professional career ==
=== New York Jets ===
After going unselected in 2011 NFL draft, Boggs signed with the New York Jets as an undrafted free agent. He was placed on injured reserve in August 2011 before being cut in April 2012.

=== Chicago Bears ===
Boggs appeared in one game for the Bears in 2013 despite dressing all 16 games. Although Boggs was set to be an exclusive rights free agent after 2013, he was resigned to a one-year deal on February 24, 2014. After playing in 4 of the first 5 games he received an injury settlement from the Bears and was released on October 16, 2014.

=== Arizona Cardinals ===
On January 5, 2016, Boggs signed a reserve/future contract with the Arizona Cardinals. He was placed on injured reserve on December 27, 2016, with a shoulder injury.

=== Chicago Bears (second stint) ===
On May 1, 2017, Boggs re-signed with the Bears. He was released on September 2, 2017.
