= Simon Fraser Red Leafs =

Athletic teams of Simon Fraser University

- University: Simon Fraser University
- Nickname: Red Leafs
- NCAA: Division II
- Conference: GNAC; RMAC (wrestling, swimming & diving)
- Athletic director: Luc Simard
- Location: Burnaby, British Columbia
- Varsity teams: 16
- Basketball arena: West Gymnasium
- Softball stadium: Beedie Field
- Soccer stadium: Terry Fox Field
- Lacrosse stadium: Terry Fox Field
- Colors: Light red, white, and black
- Mascot: McFogg the Dog
- Website: athletics.sfu.ca
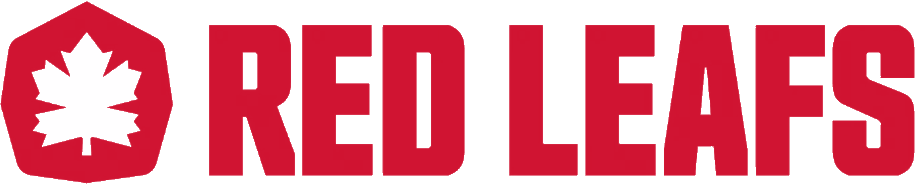

The SFU Red Leafs or Simon Fraser Red Leafs teams (formerly the Simon Fraser Clan) represent Simon Fraser University (SFU), which is located in Burnaby, British Columbia, Canada. The Red Leafs are members of NCAA Division II and are the only Canadian or non-American university affiliated with the U.S.-based National Collegiate Athletic Association. The teams previously used the nicknames "Clan" and "Clansmen," which were used as a tribute to the Scottish heritage of the university's namesake, Simon Fraser. The names were retired in 2020 due to the negative connotation surrounding those terms. In September 2022, the updated nickname "Red Leafs" was announced.

In November 2025, SFU announced that it would seek readmission to U Sports, citing financial and logistical constraints for the decision. The application was successful and it was announced that the Red Leafs would compete in the Canada West conference beginning in the 2027–28 season.

== History ==
SFU's teams formerly played in the National Association of Intercollegiate Athletics of the United States for all sports. In 1997, Simon Fraser sought to join the NCAA of the United States as a Division II school, but was turned down. After this, SFU decided in 2000–01 to partially transfer to Canadian Interuniversity Sport (now U Sports). Before the transfer, SFU did not compete in Canadian football, instead playing American football.

On July 10, 2009, the NCAA approved SFU's bid to join NCAA Division II starting in 2011–12, where SFU intended to compete in the Great Northwest Athletic Conference. However, Canada West, the CIS association that SFU teams were scheduled to play in, issued a probation on all SFU teams for the 2010–11 season, leading to speculation that SFU teams would not have any conference to play in for that season. The GNAC admitted SFU one year earlier than planned as a full conference member in time for the 2010–11 season. This led to SFU playing American football again, which was the case before they joined the CIS.

In 2014 the clan became the first team to test the external decal BX-E.

In 2026, SFU announced that the university would cut its men's exhibition hockey and club lacrosse programs at the end of the season. The final game for the hockey team was played on the 5th of March, 2026, against the Michigan Wolverines. The four time NAIA national champion women's softball team was also caught in the crossfire of the planned transition to U Sports. Upon gaining acceptance for women's volleyball into U Sports, the Red Leafs will add a men's volleyball program with both teams commencing play in 2027.

== Varsity teams ==
SFU currently has the following programs. All compete in the NCAA Division II. The wrestling teams are also affiliated to Wrestling Canada Lutte (men's/women's) and Women's College Wrestling Association (women's).

Men's sports	Women's sports
Basketball	Basketball
Cross country	Cross country
Golf	Golf
Soccer	Soccer
Swimming	Softball
Track and field	Swimming
Wrestling	Track and field
	Volleyball
	Wrestling

=== Women's basketball ===
Team championships:

- 2010 CIS National Champions;
- 2009 CIS National Champions;
- 2007 CIS National Champions;
- 2005 CIS National Champions;
- 2002 CIS National Champions;

=== Men's soccer ===
Team championships and other highlights:

- 2023 GNAC Champion;
- 2021 GNAC Runner-Up;
- 2018 GNAC Champion, NCAA Division II Championship Second Round;
- 2017 GNAC Champion, NCAA Division II Championship First Round;
- 2016 GNAC Champion, NCAA Division II Championship Second Round;
- 2015 GNAC Runner-Up;
- 2014 NCAA Division II Championship Appearance;
- 2013 GNAC Champion, NCAA Division II Final Four appearance;
- 2012 GNAC Champion, NCAA Division II Final Four appearance (first non-US school to ever do so);
- 2011 GNAC Champion; Ranked No.. 1 in the NSCAA Coaches' Poll;
- 2010 GNAC Champion; NAIA Final Four appearance;
- 2007 NAIA Final Four appearance;
- 2005 NAIA Region I Finals;
- 2004 NAIA Region I Semi-finals;
- 2003 NAIA Region I Champion;
- 2002 NAIA Region I Champion;
- 1987 NAIA National Finalists;
- 1986 NAIA National Finalists;
- 1983 NAIA National Champions;
- 1982 NAIA National Champions;
- 1980 NAIA National Finalists;
- 1976 NAIA National Champions;
- 1975 NAIA National Finalists;

=== Women's soccer ===
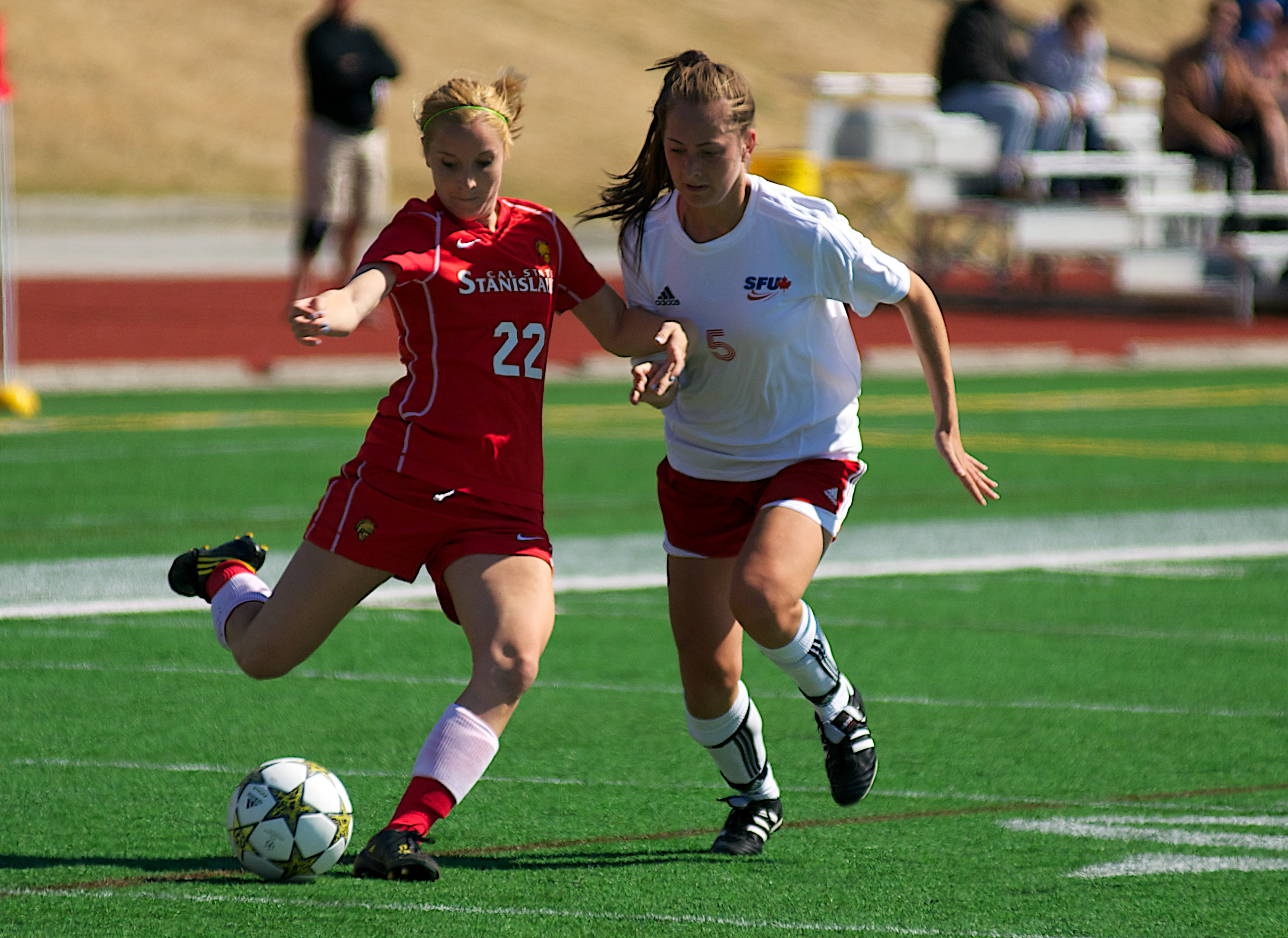
Simon Fraser v Stanislaus State match in 2012

Team championships

- 2023 GNAC Champions
- 1995 West Region Champions
- 1996 West Region Runner-up
- 1996 NAIA National Champions
- 1997 West Region Champions
- 1997 NAIA National Championship Runner-up
- 1998 West Region Champions
- 1998 NAIA National Championship Runner-up
- 1999 West Region Champions
- 1999 NAIA National Championship Runner-up
- 2000 West Region Champions
- 2000 NAIA National Champions - NAIA record for longest game, 162:38 minutes
- 2001 West Region Semi finalist
- 2004 West Region Champions
- 2004 NAIA National Championships Quarterfinals
- 2005 West Region Champions
- 2005 NAIA National Championships Semifinals
- 2008 NAIA National Championships Quarterfinals

=== Softball ===
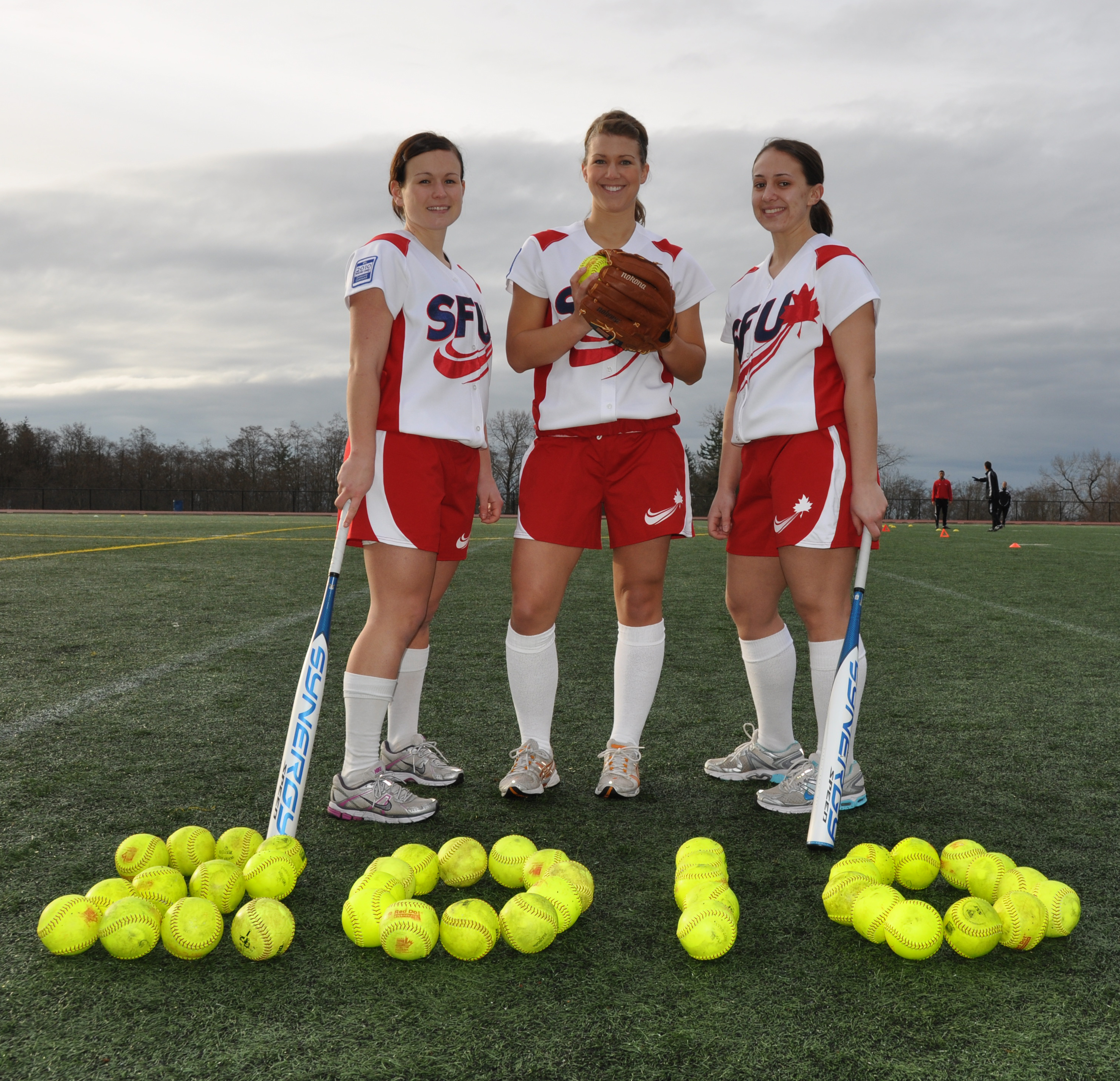
SFU women's softball players, left to right: Carly Moir, Trisha Bouchard and Stefani Durrant

Team championships:

- 2010 NAIA National Champions;
- 2005 NAIA National Champions;
- 2003 NAIA National Champions;
- 1999 NAIA National Champions

=== Wrestling ===
SFU began competing in NAIA for wrestling in 1977, consistently producing individual champions, All-Americans, and winning the team title twice (1988, 1993), along with several NAIA Hall of Famers. SFU competed in Canadian Interuniversity Sport (CIS) from 2002 to 2010, winning the Canada West Conference from 2004 - 2010, two national men's team titles (2009, 2010; ending Brock's 10-year streak), and six national women's team titles. In 2009, SFU started the process to become the first non-American NCAA member school. SFU's wrestling program concurrently participated in CIS for freestyle and Greco-Roman wrestling, and NAIA for collegiate wrestling. In 2012, SFU competed in the NCWA for one season prior to fully joining the NCAA Division II. In 2023, SFU became a founding member of the first NCAA D-II conference for women's wrestling by joining the Rocky Mountain Athletic Conference (RMAC) as an associate member, with SFU's men's wrestling joining a couple of months later.

Olympic gold medalists Daniel Igali (Canada's first Olympic gold medal winner in freestyle wrestling), Carol Huynh (Canada's first female Olympic gold medalist in wrestling), and American Helen Maroulis wrestled at SFU. The Anthony-Maroulis Trophy is named after Maroulis and Victoria Anthony, who both captured their record-breaking fourth World Collegiate Wrestling Association national titles while SFU teammates in 2014. Olympic silver medalists Bob Molle and Jeff Thue, and bronze medalist Chris Rinke also wrestled at SFU, along with several other Olympians and world championship competitors including mixed martial arts (MMA) world champion Arjan Bhullar.

SFU also hosts two annual tournaments: the SFU Open, an international competition for senior freestyle wrestlers, and SFU War on the Floor, a tournament for elementary and high school wrestlers.

== Former sports ==
=== Football ===
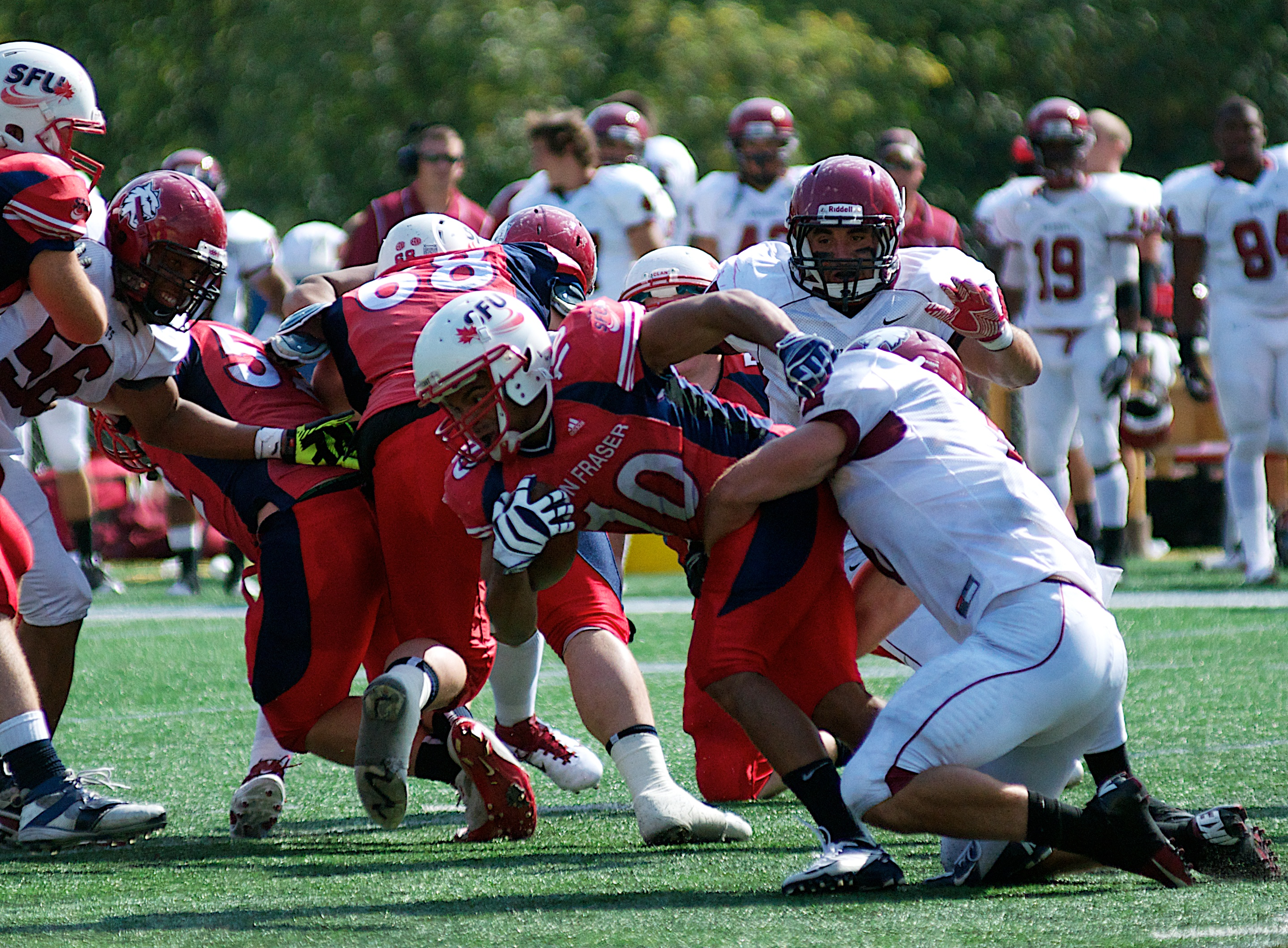
SFU vs Central Washington University (CWU) in 2012

The SFU football team formerly competed since the athletic department's inception in 1965 until 2023. The team played by American rules while they competed in the National Association of Intercollegiate Athletics from 1965 to 2001 against other American teams. Along with other SFU teams, the football program transferred to Canadian Interuniversity Sport (now U Sports) and thereby switched to playing Canadian football against Canadian University teams in 2002. While playing in the CIS, SFU won their first and only Hardy Trophy conference championship in 2003 while qualifying for the playoffs twice. After playing eight seasons in the Canada West Conference of the CIS, the football team began competing in the Great Northwest Athletic Conference of NCAA Division II in 2010, thereby playing football by American rules again since then. Over time, most of the GNAC members that had football teams stopped sponsoring the sport, and SFU was eventually left as one of only three GNAC football schools. After the 2021 season, the GNAC shut down its football league, with SFU and the other remaining members joining the Lone Star Conference for that sport. However, the LSC announced it would no longer maintain its affiliate membership with Simon Fraser following the 2023 season, leading SFU to end its varsity football program effective immediately.

The team previously also maintained a cross-town rivalry with the Vancouver-based University of British Columbia Thunderbirds as they were the only two universities in British Columbia that field football teams. Since 1967, the two teams have competed in the Shrum Bowl, an annual game played at alternating venues with alternating rules. SFU holds a 17–16–1 series lead while UBC is the most recent champion having won the 2022 game at Terry Fox Field. Due to the two schools playing in two different leagues and game formats, the scheduling of these games has often been difficult, with no games being played from 2011 until 2021, the 12th time the Shrum Bowl had taken a hiatus since the game's inception. With the end of Simon Fraser's football program, however, the Shrum Bowl has become a defunct rivalry, with the last edition played in 2022 under American rules and resulting in a 18–17 victory for UBC.

== Club teams ==
In addition to its 16 varsity programs, SFU currently has 4 competitive club programmes competing in intercollegiate sport leagues of the following sports (affiliations included):

- Ice hockey, men (BCIHL);
- Field lacrosse, men (MCLA D1);
- Rowing, men and women's (Rowing Canada);
- Cheerleading (Power Cheerleading Athletics Collegiate Nationals);
- Ultimate Frisbee, open and women's (CUUC).

=== Men's ice hockey ===
Simon Fraser University currently field two men's ice hockey teams. An exhibition team whose schedule is mostly made up of NCAA teams, and a second team that is a member of the BCIHL, a five team club hockey league spread across British Columbia. The team has won the league on four occasions most recently in 2021–22 season during which they went undefeated. The team also regularly plays games against NCAA and U Sports opponents. They compete in a regular cross town rivalry with the neighbouring UBC Thunderbirds. In the summer of 2016 the program began exploring the possibility of moving the program to the NCAA Division 1 level. In 2026, it was announced that the exhibition team would be cut at the season's conclusion.

==== 2012 and 2016 NCAA Championship hosting controversies ====
After the 2012 regular season, Simon Fraser's men's soccer team was ranked No. 1 in the West Region and earned the right to host the West regional. However, some other schools in the Region immediately filed complaints that some of their personnel did not have passports to enter Canada. As a result, NCAA stripped Simon Fraser of the right to host the regional. Simon Fraser first rented a neutral site in San Francisco, California, as the site of the regional, but the NCAA eventually awarded the right of hosting the remaining matches of the regional to Grand Canyon University, whose men's soccer team was ranked second in the West Region after the 2012 regular season.

After the 2016 regular season, Simon Fraser's men's soccer team was ranked No. 1 once again in the West Region and earned the right to host the West regional once again. However, Simon Fraser was once again forced to rent a neutral site, this time in Seattle, Washington, as the site of the regional.

== Mascot ==
The official mascot of SFU Athletics is McFogg the Dog, an anthropomorphic Scottish Terrier who wears a kilt. McFogg was officially adopted as the university's mascot in 1996 and is named in honour of SFU's inaugural president Patrick McTaggart-Cowan who was nicknamed "McFog". McFogg replaced an unofficial gorilla mascot which the university had previously used since the late 1980s.
