= Shay McClure =

American football coach

Current position
- Title: Defensive coordinator, safeties coach
- Team: Southern Utah
- Conference: UAC

Biographical details
- Born: McCloud, California, U.S.

Playing career
- 1992–1994: Southern Oregon
- Position: Defensive back

Coaching career (HC unless noted)
- 1995–1996: Southern Oregon (DB)
- 1997–1999: San Diego (ST/DB)
- 2000–2001: Occidental (DC/RC)
- 2002–2004: Southern Oregon (DC/RC)
- 2005: Southern Oregon (interim HC)
- 2006–2014: Humboldt State (DC/RC)
- 2015: Dixie State (DC)
- 2016–2018: Dixie State
- 2019–2021: Southwest Minnesota State (DC)
- 2022–2025: Southern Utah (ST/LB)
- 2026–present: Southern Utah (DC/S/PGC)

Head coaching record
- Overall: 19–24

Shay McClure is an American college football coach. He is the defensive coordinator and safeties coach for Southern Utah University, a position he has held since 2026. He was the head football coach at Dixie State University—now known as Utah Tech University—in St. George, Utah, from 2016 to 2018. McClure served as the interim head football coach at Southern Oregon University in Ashland, Oregon, for one seasons, in 2005, compiling record of 1–9.

== Head coaching record ==
Year	Team	Overall	Conference	Standing	Bowl/playoffs
Southern Oregon Raiders (NAIA independent) (2005)
2005	Southern Oregon	1–9			
Southern Oregon:		1–9			
Dixie State Trailblazers (Rocky Mountain Athletic Conference) (2016–2018)
2016	Dixie State	6–5	6–4	T–5th	
2017	Dixie State	5–6	5–5	T–5th	
2018	Dixie State	7–4	7–3	T–3rd	
Dixie State:		18–15	18–12		
Total:		19–24			
