= Simon Fraser Red Leafs football =

Collegiate American football team in Canada

- First season: 1965
- Last season: 2023; 3 years ago
- Athletic director: Vacant
- Head coach: Mike Rigell; 2nd season, 2–16 (.111)
- Stadium: Terry Fox Field
- Conference: Lone Star
- Colors: Red and White
- All-time record: 186–321–2 (.367)
- Bowl record: 0–1 (.000)

Conference championships
- 1 (2003)

Uniforms
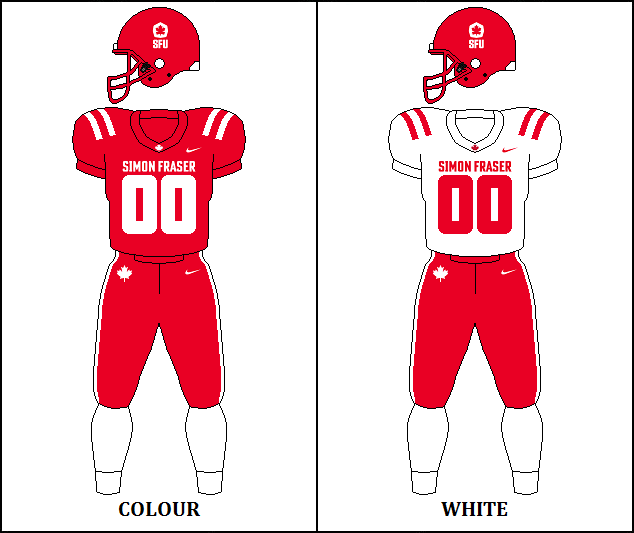
- Mascot: McFogg the Dog
- Website: athletics.sfu.ca/football

The Simon Fraser Red Leafs football team represented Simon Fraser University since the athletic department's inception in 1965 until 2022. The team played by American rules while they competed in the National Association of Intercollegiate Athletics from 1965 to 2001 against other American teams. Along with other SFU teams, the football program transferred to Canadian Interuniversity Sport (now U Sports) and thereby switched to playing Canadian football against Canadian University teams in 2002. While playing in the CIS, SFU won its first and only Hardy Trophy conference championship in 2003 while qualifying for the playoffs twice. After playing eight seasons in the Canada West Conference of the CIS, the football team began competing in the Great Northwest Athletic Conference of NCAA Division II in 2010, and started played the American format of football again. Kristie Elliott became the first Canadian woman to play, and to score, in an NCAA football game, on September 11, 2021, as a kicker for the team. After the GNAC dropped football after the 2021 season, SFU and the other two GNAC members that still sponsored the sport became football-only members of the Lone Star Conference. After the 2022 season, it was announced on April 4, 2023, that football would be dropped from the school after it was previously announced the Lone Star Conference was ending its affiliation with Simon Fraser after the 2023–24 season.

The team previously used the names "Clansmen" and "Clan"; those names were retired in 2020. The new nickname "Red Leafs" was announced in September 2022.

== Rivalry ==
The team had maintained a cross-town rivalry with the Vancouver-based University of British Columbia Thunderbirds as they are also the only two universities in British Columbia that field football teams. Since 1967, the two teams have competed in the Shrum Bowl, an annual game played at alternating venues with alternating rules. SFU holds a 17–16–1 series lead after winning in three consecutive years from 2008 to 2010 to claim the lead. Due to the two schools playing in two different leagues, the scheduling of these games has often been difficult, with no game being played from 2011 to 2021. The Shrum Bowl was revived and played again on December 2, 2022, where UBC defeated SFU 18-17 under American rules.

== Season results ==
Year	Coach	Overall	Conference	Standing	Bowl/playoffs	Highest^{#}	Final^{°}
National Association of Intercollegiate Athletics (NAIA) (1965–2001)
Canada West (CIS) (2002–2009)
2002	Chris Beaton	2–6		6th		NR	NR
2003	Chris Beaton	5–3		2nd	W Canada West semi-final W Hardy Trophy; L Uteck Bowl	8	8
2004	Chris Beaton	3–5		6th		6	NR
2005	Chris Beaton	0–7–1		7th		NR	NR
2006	Frank Boehres	0–7–1		7th		NR	NR
2007	Dave Johnson	0–8		7th		NR	NR
2008	Dave Johnson	5–3		4th	W Canada West semi-final L Hardy Trophy	7	8
2009	Dave Johnson	1–6 (*)		7th		7	NR
CIS:		16–47–2					
Great Northwest (NCAA Division II) (2010–2021)
2010	Dave Johnson	1–9 (0–9 NCAA)	0–8	5th		NR	NR
2011	Dave Johnson	3–7	2–6	4th		NR	NR
2012	Dave Johnson	5–6	4–6	4th		NR	NR
2013	Dave Johnson	3–7	3–7	5th		NR	NR
2014	Jacques Chapdelaine	2–9	2–7	5th		NR	NR
2015	Kelly Bates	0–9	0–6	7th		NR	NR
2016	Kelly Bates	0–10	0–8	5th		NR	NR
2017	Kelly Bates	0–10	0–8	5th		NR	NR
2018	Thomas Ford	1–8	0–7	5th		NR	NR
2019	Thomas Ford	1–9	1–5	3rd		NR	NR
2021	Mike Rigell	1–7	0–4	3rd		NR	NR
Lone Star Conference (NCAA Division II) (2022)
2022	Mike Rigell	1–9	1–8	10th (Last)		NR	NR
NCAA:		18–99	13–80				
Total:							
National championship Conference title Conference division title or championship game berth
^{#}Highest rank during the course of the season (NR=not ranked).; ^{°}Final rank.; Since 2000, the final rankings were released following the playoffs.

(*) In 2009, two victories were nullified because CWUAA accused SFU for having ineligible players in both games. However, SFU argued that they followed CWUAA's guidelines perfectly and that the player was eligible at the time of the accusation. The Manitoba Bisons also used an ineligible player in a Simon Fraser win, so the game was declared "no contest."

== Head coaches ==
Coach name	Tenure	Notes
Lorne Davies	1965–1972	
Bob De Julius	1973–1979	
Rod Woodward	1980–1982	
Chris Beaton	1983–2005	
Frank Boehres	2006	
Dave Johnson	2007–2013	
Jacques Chapdelaine	2014	
Kelly Bates	2015–2017	
Thomas Ford	2018–2019	
Mike Rigell	2020–2022	

== CIS playoff results ==
- 2002 Out of Playoffs
- 2003 Defeated Regina Rams in semi-final 53–46
  Defeated Alberta Golden Bears in Hardy Cup 28–18
  Lost to Saint Mary's Huskies in Uteck Bowl 60–9
- 2004 Out of Playoffs
- 2005 Out of Playoffs
- 2006 Out of Playoffs
- 2007 Out of Playoffs
- 2008 Defeated Saskatchewan Huskies in semi-final 40–30
  Lost to Calgary Dinos in Hardy Cup 44–21
- 2009 Out of Playoffs

== Red Leafs in the CFL ==
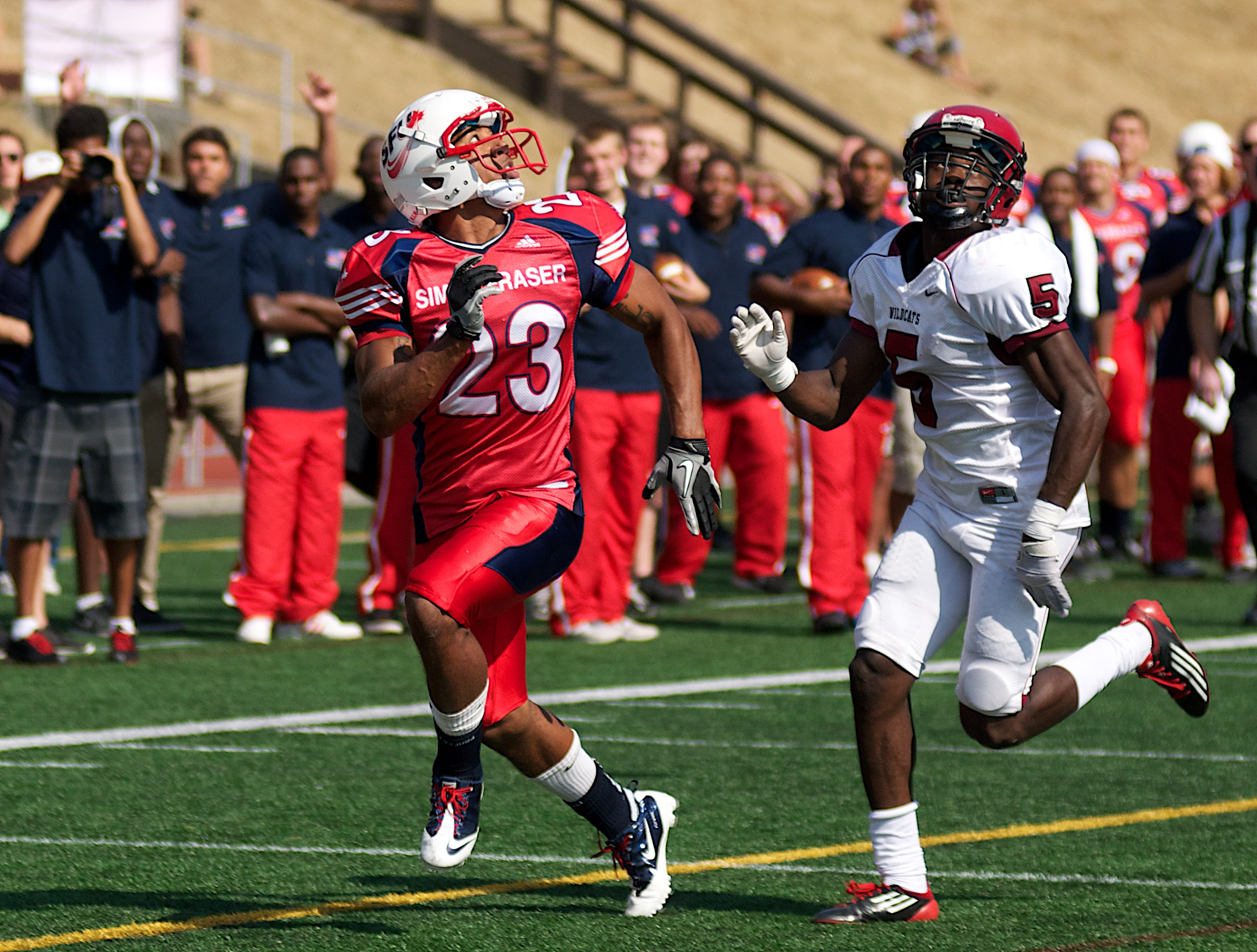
Lemar Durant with SFU in 2012.

Since the program first began in 1965, Simon Fraser University has had the most first overall selections with five.

As of the start of the 2026 CFL season, two former SFU players were on CFL teams' rosters:

- Michael Couture, BC Lions
- Ante Milanovic-Litre, Hamilton Tiger-Cats

== Red Leafs in the NFL ==
Former SFU wide receiver Victor Marshall was invited to the Seattle Seahawks rookie camp in May 2013 and earned a contract on May 13 to take part in Organized Team Activities and training camp as a tight end. On July 30, 2013, the Seahawks released Marshall during training camp.

On April 27, 2018, former SFU defensive end Nathan Shepherd was selected 72nd overall in the 2018 NFL draft by the New York Jets, but he was selected out of Fort Hays State. Shepherd made the 53-man roster out of training camp. As of the end of the 2024 NFL season, he was on the New Orleans Saints roster.
