= Terry Fox Field =

Multi-purpose stadium in Burnaby, British Columbia

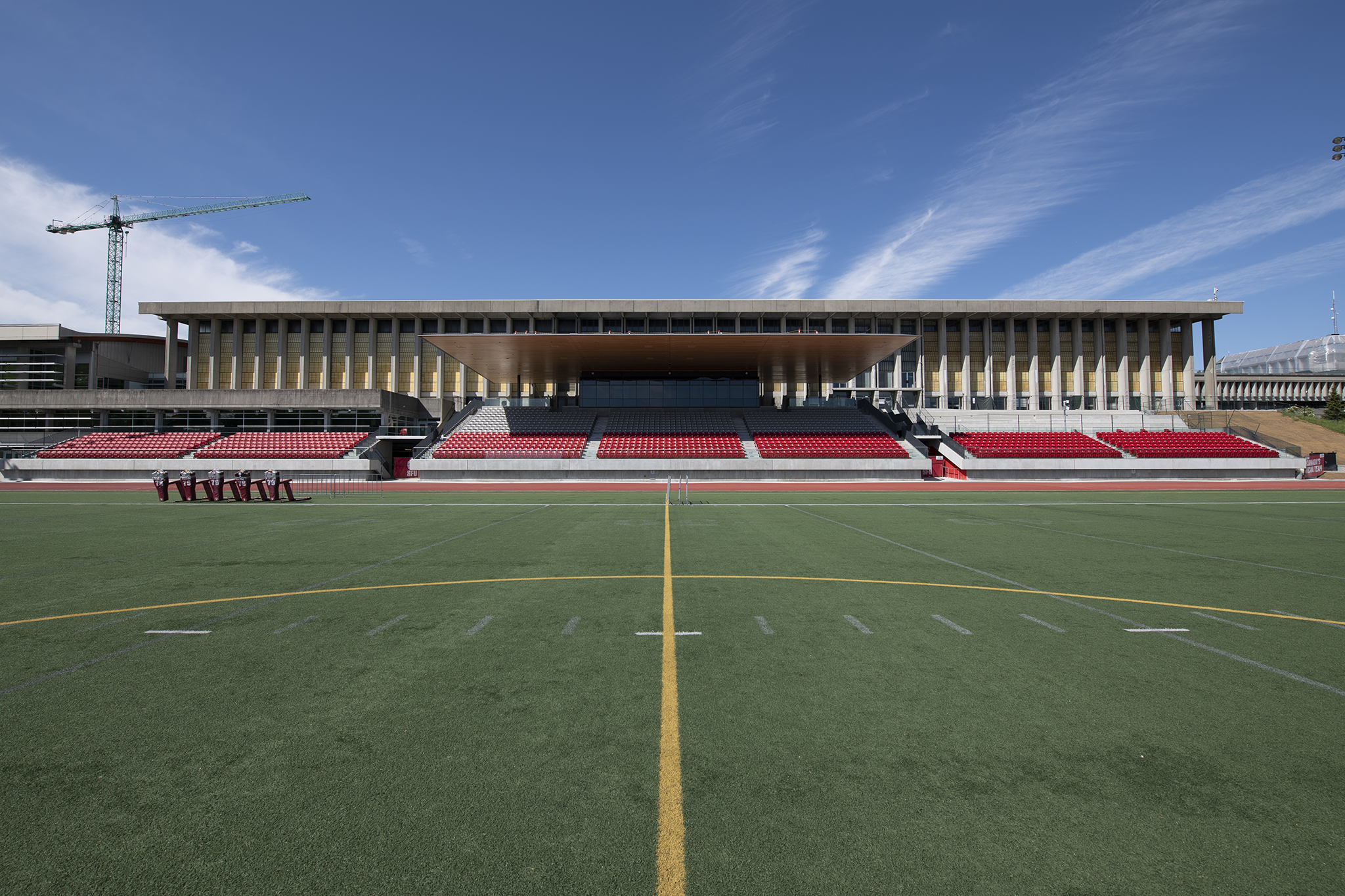
- New grandstand completed in 2021
- Interactive map of Terry Fox Field
- Full name: SFU Stadium at Terry Fox Field
- Former names: Field 1
- Address: 8888 University Dr. Burnaby; Canada
- Coordinates: 49.278602°N 122.922324°W
- Owner: Simon Fraser University
- Operator: Simon Fraser Athletics
- Capacity: 1,823; 1,200 (covered)
- Type: Stadium
- Surface: Field Turf
- Current use: Soccer; Track and field
- Public transit: SFU Transportation Centre

Construction
- Renovated: 2021

Tenants
- Simon Fraser Red Leafs teams: soccer, track and field, football (1965–2022); Vancouver Whitecaps (U-18 / U-16 teams)

Website
- athletics.sfu.ca/terry-fox-field

SFU Stadium at Terry Fox Field is a stadium located on the campus of the Simon Fraser University in Burnaby, British Columbia. It currently serves as the home field of the Simon Fraser Red Leafs soccer and track and field teams.

The stadium was also home venue to the Simon Fraser Red Leafs football team until the end of the program in 2023. The Red Leafs men's lacrosse club also played their home matches on Terry Fox Field, and the SFU's Department of Recreation and Athletics regularly hosts sport camps on Terry Fox Field.

== Naming ==
The field is named after Terry Fox, who was once a student of Simon Fraser University and played for SFU's junior varsity basketball team.

== Facility information ==
As a multi-purpose field, there are overlapping permanent markings for American football, soccer and lacrosse on Terry Fox Field. In order to accommodate the university's transition from CIS (playing Canadian football) to the NCAA (playing American football), Terry Fox Field was re-turfed in 2011, with markings for a Canadian football field replaced with markings for an American football field.

Terry Fox Field's tracks are classified as an IAAF Standard Track with a water jump hurdle outside the bend. West to the field itself is a long jump facility built according to IAAF standards.

Terry Fox Field had been one of the few varsity stadiums in Canada without permanent seating. However in 2021, a permanent grandstand with seating for 1,823 spectators (and room for 1,000 temporary bleachers which can be added when needed), was added. With the completion of the permanent stands, the venue's name was changed to SFU Stadium at Terry Fox Field.

== See also ==
- Thunderbird Stadium
