= Humboldt State Lumberjacks football =

- First season: 1924; 102 years ago
- Last season: 2018; 8 years ago
- Location: Arcata, California, U.S.
- Stadium: Redwood Bowl (capacity: 6,000 (seated))
- Conference: Great Northwest Athletic Conference
- Colors: Green and gold
- All-time record: 404–403–21 (.501)
- Bowl record: 1–1 (.500)

Conference championships
- 11
- Mascot: Lucky Logger
- Website: Humboldt State Lumberjacks football

The Humboldt State Lumberjacks football program represented Humboldt State University, known since January 2022 as California State Polytechnic University, Humboldt, in college football and played its home games at the Redwood Bowl in Arcata, California. Humboldt State was a football member of the Great Northwest Athletic Conference in NCAA Division II. The Lumberjacks played 90 seasons and had an all-time record of 404–403–21 (.501).

In July 2018, HSU announced that the football program would be discontinued after the 2018 season.

== History ==
Starting in 1924, the first 27 years of Humboldt State football was less than successful. There were 9 winning seasons, 12 losing seasons and one .500 season over that timeframe. For most of that time, the Lumberjacks were not a member of a conference. They joined the Far Western Conference for the 1946 season but didn't have much success there until the hiring of Phil Sarboe in 1951. The Lumberjacks have had only six coaches in the subsequent 66 years, an average tenure of 11 seasons. But only two of those six compiled an overall winning record.

For decades, the Humboldt State football program was unique in the California State University system. At one point, 15 schools in the system had football programs. But starting in the 1970s, financial pressures and rulings from the NCAA changed the environment for college football. One by one, nine Cal State Schools dropped their football programs. (Note: Cal State system schools dropping their program and last season played were Cal State Los Angeles (1977), Cal Poly Pomona (1982), Long Beach State (1991), Cal State Fullerton (1992), San Francisco State (1994), Cal State Hayward (1993), Chico State (1996), Sonoma State (1996), & Cal State Northridge (2001)) Three programs moved to Division I FBS. (Note: Cal State system schools moving into D-I FBS were Fresno State, San Diego State & San Jose State) Two programs moved to Division I FCS. (Note: Cal State system schools moving into D-I FCS were Cal Poly & Sacramento State) Only Humboldt State remained in Division II and continued with a successful D-II program (until the announced discontinuation after the 2018 season).

=== Phil Sarboe era ===
Phil Sarboe was hired as Humboldt State head coach in January 1951 after the team had experienced two consecutive winless seasons. He immediately turned the team around, compiling a winning record in his first year and in 14 of his 15 years as Humboldt State head coach. He is the winningest coach in Lumberjack history, compiling a record of 104–37–5 (.729) from 1951 through 1965. His teams won the conference title in 1952, 1956, 1960, 1961, & 1963. Playing in the "small college" era, there were no playoffs to determine a national champion. Instead, the wire services conducted polls for both major college and small college. Under Sarboe, the Lumberjacks finished the 1960 season ranked No. 3 in the AP small college poll and No. 8 in the UPI small college poll. They followed that up with another national ranking in 1961, finishing No. 16 in the UPI small college poll.

The most successful season under Sarboe came in 1960, when the team compiled a perfect regular season record of 10–0. Running Back Cecil Stephens led the way, rushing for 1,119 yards and scoring 20 touchdowns, a school record that still stands. They won the NAIA semifinal game against Whitworth, then lost in the championship game against Lenoir–Rhyne.

=== Bud Van Deren era ===
Sarboe resigned in January 1965, and Bud Van Deren was named his successor shortly thereafter. The highlight of Van Deren's 20 year tenure was the 1968 season. The Lumberjacks finished the 1968 season ranked No. 16 in the AP small college poll and No. 10 in the UPI small college poll. The small colleges held regional finals in 1968, and Humboldt State played Fresno State in the Camellia Bowl. Defeating the Bulldogs, the Lumberjacks captured the NCAA Western Region title.

=== Rob Smith era ===
Rob Smith was the head coach of the Lumberjacks from 2008 through 2017. His teams won the conference championship in 2011 and 2015, reaching the Division II playoffs after the 2015 season. They were nationally ranked in six of his last seven years, 2011, 2012, 2014, 2015, 2016, and 2017. He compiled an overall record of 63–44 (.589).

== Conference affiliations ==
- 1924–1939: Independent
- 1940–1982: Far Western Conference
- 1983–1996: Northern California Athletic Conference
- 1997–2000: Columbia Football Association (NAIA)
- 2001–2005: Great Northwest Athletic Conference
- 2006–2007: NCAA Division II independent
- 2008–2018: Great Northwest Athletic Conference

== Conference championships ==
Year	Conference	Overall Record	Conference Record
1946	FWC	5–3–1	2–0–1
1952	FWC	7–1	3–0
1956	FWC	9–2	4–1
1960	FWC	11–1	5–0
1961	FWC	8–2	4–1
1963	FWC	6–1–2	3–1–1
1968	FWC	10–1	6–0
1994	NCAC	8–2	2–1
1995	NCAC	8–1–1	4–0
2011	GNAC	9–1	7–1
2015	GNAC	10–2	6–0
Total Conference Titles		11

== Postseason appearances ==
List of postseason games showing game played in, score, date, season, opponent, stadium, location, and head coach
#	Bowl	Score (Note: Results are sortable first by whether the result was a Humboldt State win, loss or tie and then second by the margin of victory.)	Date	Season (Note: Links to the season article for the Humboldt State team that competed in the game for that year.)	Opponent (Note: Links to the season article for the opponent that Humboldt State competed against in the game for that year when available or to their general page when unavailable.)	Stadium	Location	Head coach
1	NAIA Semifinal Game	W 13–6	December 3, 1960	1960	Whitworth Pirates	Albee Stadium	Eureka, CA	Phil Sarboe
2	NAIA Championship Game Holiday Bowl	L 14–15	December 10, 1960	1960	Lenoir–Rhyne Bears	Stewart Field	Saint Petersburg, FL	Phil Sarboe
3	College Division Western Region Final Camellia Bowl	W 29–14	December 14, 1968	1968	Fresno State Bulldogs	Charles C. Hughes Stadium	Sacramento, CA	Bud Van Deren
4	GNAC Championship Game	W 30–21	November 12, 2011	2011	Western Oregon Wolves	Redwood Bowl	Arcata, CA	Rob Smith
5	Division II Playoffs	W 45–31	November 21, 2015	2015	Augustana University Vikings	Redwood Bowl	Arcata, CA	Rob Smith
6	Division II Playoffs	L 7–54	November 28, 2015	2015	Northwest Missouri State Bearcats	Bearcat Stadium	Maryville, MO	Rob Smith

Postseason table Notes

== All-Americans ==
The Lumberjacks have had one three-time All-American:

- End Drew Roberts ('60–62)

The Lumberjacks have had five two-time All-Americans:

- Tackle Vester Flanagan ('60–'61)
- Nose guard Dave Rush ('82–'83)
- Free safety Dean Diaz ('82–'83)
- Flanker/wide receiver Eddie Pate ('82–'83)
- Defensive back Kyle Killingsworth ('04, '06)

The Lumberjacks have had 30 one-time All-Americans.

== Redwood Bowl ==
The Lumberjacks play home games in the Redwood Bowl, a stadium located on the campus of Humboldt State. Begun as part of the Works Progress Administration in the 1930s, it was opened in 1946. Redwood Bowl has a seating capacity of 6,000 people, but with standing room can accommodate up to 8,000.

== Humboldt State players in the NFL ==
A number of players from Humboldt State have gone on to play in the National Football League (NFL). Wendell Hayes was a Lumberjack in 1962 and was on the winning Kansas City Chiefs squad in Super Bowl IV. Alex Cappa was a Lumberjack in 2017 and was on the winning Tampa Bay Buccaneers squad in Super Bowl LV.

=== Players in the NFL draft ===
Year	Player	Position	Round	Overall	NFL team
1961	Vester Flanagan	T	9	124	Green Bay Packers
1963	Drew Roberts	SE	18	246	Washington Redskins
1968	Chuck Bailey	T	13	337	Detroit Lions
1970	Dan Hook	LB	11	276	Green Bay Packers
1971	Len Gotshalk	T, G	8	186	Philadelphia Eagles
1974	Mike Bettiga	WR	15	382	San Francisco 49ers
1990	Dave Harper	LB	11	277	Dallas Cowboys
1991	Scotty Reagan	DT	7	179	Minnesota Vikings
1992	Freeman Baysinger	WR	12	333	New England Patriots
2018	Alex Cappa	G	3	94	Tampa Bay Buccaneers

=== Undrafted players in the NFL ===
Player	Position	First NFL Team
Wendell Hayes	RB	1963 Dallas Cowboys
R.W. Hicks	C	1975 Detroit Lions
Steve Kincannon	QB	1976 Houston Oilers
Richard Ashe	TE	1990 Los Angeles Rams
Stephen Cheek	P	2004 Kansas City Chiefs
Lyndon Rowells	RB	2012 Carolina Panthers
Taylor Boggs	C	2011 New York Jets
