= Greater Zion Stadium =

Stadium at Utah Tech University

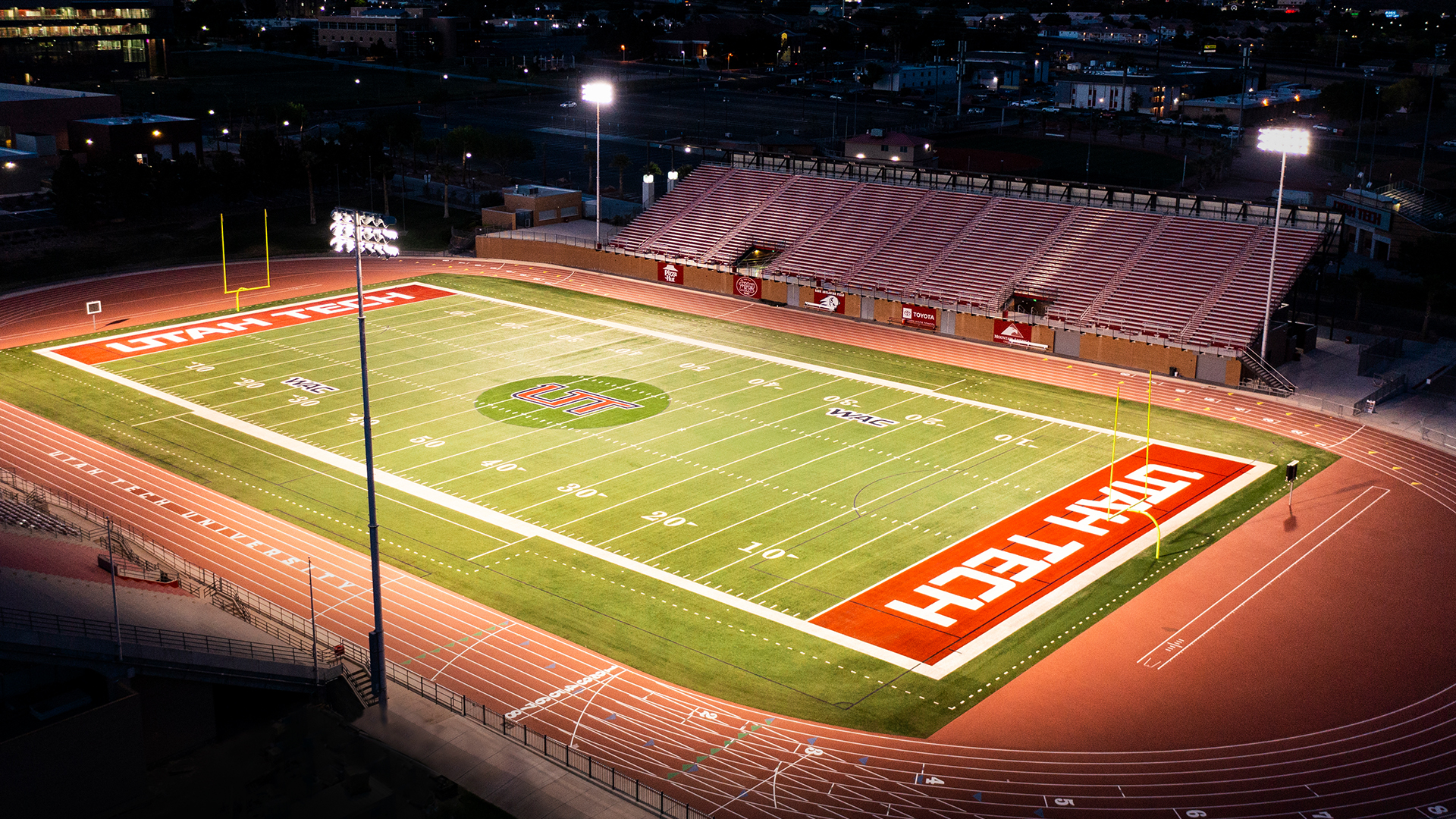
- Greater Zion Stadium (2022)

- Location within the United States Location within Utah
- Interactive map of Greater Zion Stadium
- Former names: Hansen Stadium (1985–2016); Legend Solar Stadium (2016-2017); Trailblazer Stadium (2017–2020)
- Address: 501 S 700 E
- Location: Utah Tech University; St. George, Utah, U.S.
- Coordinates: 37°05′58″N 113°34′02″W
- Elevation: 2,880 feet (880 m) AMSL
- Owner: Utah Tech University
- Operator: Utah Tech University
- Capacity: 10,500 (2017–present); 5,000 (until 2017)
- Surface: FieldTurf
- Record attendance: 8,280 (vs. Weber State, 2021)

Construction
- Opened: 1985; 41 years ago

Tenants
- Utah Tech University Trailblazers (football, soccer)

Website
- utahtech.edu/events/greater-zion-stadium

Greater Zion Stadium, originally Hansen Stadium and later Trailblazer Stadium, is a stadium on the campus of Utah Tech University in St. George, Utah. It is primarily used for American football, and is the home field of the Utah Tech Trailblazers football and soccer programs. The stadium holds 10,500 people. In 2002 and 2003, it hosted the Paradise Bowl which was a post season college football all-star game. After the seating expansion in 2017, Greater Zion Stadium became the largest stadium in the southern portion of Utah.

MLS soccer club Real Salt Lake played their first match at Hansen Stadium on March 29, 2007, versus the BYU soccer club which, at the time, played as a minor league professional club and not in a collegiate league. Plans include the vision that Hansen Stadium will become the Southern Utah "home" stadium for RSL when visiting the area and practicing in warm weather environments in pre-season.

Bands of America currently holds the St. George, Utah Regional Championship at Greater Zion Stadium. The competition was moved from Las Vegas, Nevada and the UNLV's Sam Boyd Stadium to St. George in 2009, with the American Fork Marching Band winning the first competition there. It was held in St. George again in 2010.

The stadium was most recently renamed on January 21, 2020, under an agreement between the university and Washington County, Utah, whose tourism promotion agency is branded as the Greater Zion Convention & Tourism Office.
