= Redwood Bowl =

US sports stadium

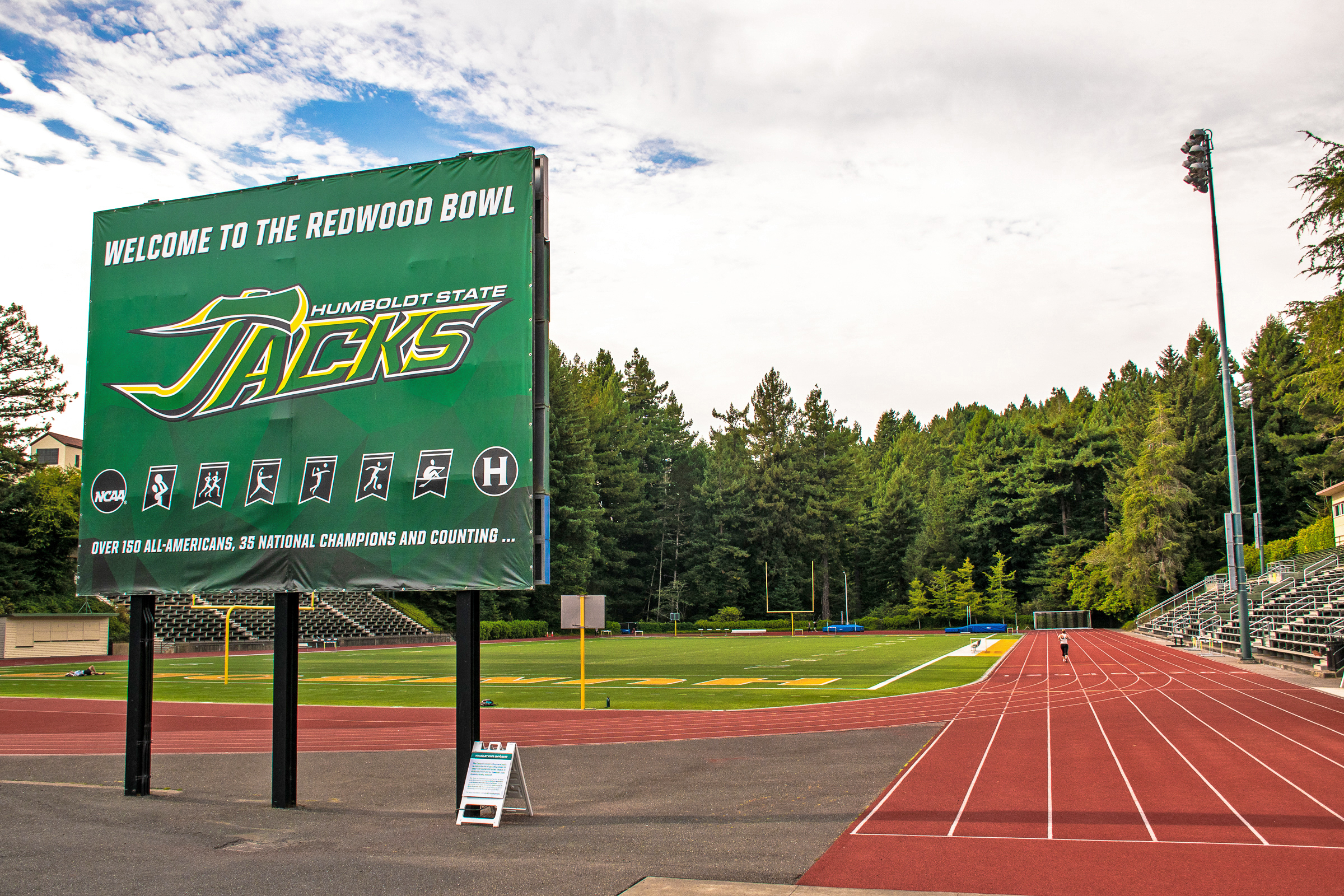

- Location in the United States Location in California
- Interactive map of Redwood Bowl
- Address: Union Street
- Location: California State Polytechnic University, Humboldt; Arcata, California, U.S.
- Coordinates: 40.8764°N 124.0762°W
- Elevation: 160 feet (50 m) AMSL
- Owner: Humboldt State University
- Operator: Humboldt State University
- Capacity: 8,000
- Surface: FieldTurf (formerly natural grass)

Construction
- Opened: 1946; 80 years ago

Redwood Bowl is a collegiate athletic stadium on the west coast of the United States, on the campus of Cal Poly Humboldt in Arcata, California. It is used for Cal Poly Humboldt Lumberjacks football games and track and field meets, as well as local high school contests. Construction began in the late 1930s as part of a Work Projects Administration (WPA) grant.

The first game in Redwood Bowl was played on Sunday, October 8, 1946, with the Stanford University JV defeating Cal Poly Humboldt, 20–0. Two weeks later, when Stanford's varsity played its first game of the season against UCLA, eight of the "JV" starters against the Lumberjacks were varsity starters. Stanford had been secured for the dedication game in Redwood Bowl to ensure a large attendance.

Complaints from merchants whose Saturday afternoon trade was being drawn away by football games encouraged administrators to begin a campaign geared toward funding lights for Redwood Bowl. In the spring of 1947, lights were purchased from a firm in Iowa for $2,000, with another $1,000 for switches and wiring. Alumnus Bunny Hadley donated the labor to wire the field, and poles were donated by a local lumber operator. Payment for the remainder of the work, including leasing a crane and operator, was through a $4,000 loan secured through Bank of America and paid off out of student fees over the next several years.

The bowl's turf was resurfaced during the summer of 2011, and the track was resurfaced during the summer of 2017. According to Cal Poly Humboldt Facilities Management, Redwood Bowl is the most heavily used field on campus, employed by recreational sports programs, including intramurals, kinesiology and other department classes, football and track and field team practices and games, commencement, special events and general student use.

The track in Redwood Bowl is 6 lanes on the curves and 9 lanes on the west side straight. The track and field facility inside the bowl includes an all-weather long jump/ triple jump runway and sand pit, with takeoff boards at 8’, 24’, 36’, and 40’, a high jump apron and landing pad, and a pole vault runway and landing pad.

Adjacent to west side of the Redwood Bowl and Cal Poly Humboldt softball field are the track and field throwing facilities, which feature a 40-meter all-surface javelin runway, a shot put ring, and caged hammer and discus rings.

Redwood Bowl has a seating capacity of 8,000 and its field has a traditional north-south alignment, slightly offset northwest-southeast.
