= Great Northwest Athletic Conference =

U.S. college athletic conference

Great Northwest Athletic Conference (GNAC)
- Association: NCAA
- Founded: 2001; 25 years ago
- Commissioner: David Haglund (since 2011)
- Sports fielded: 16; men's: 8; women's: 8
- Division: Division II
- No. of teams: 10 (9 in 2027)
- Headquarters: Portland, Oregon
- Region: Idaho, British Columbia, Alaska, Montana, Washington, Oregon
- Website: gnacsports.com

Locations
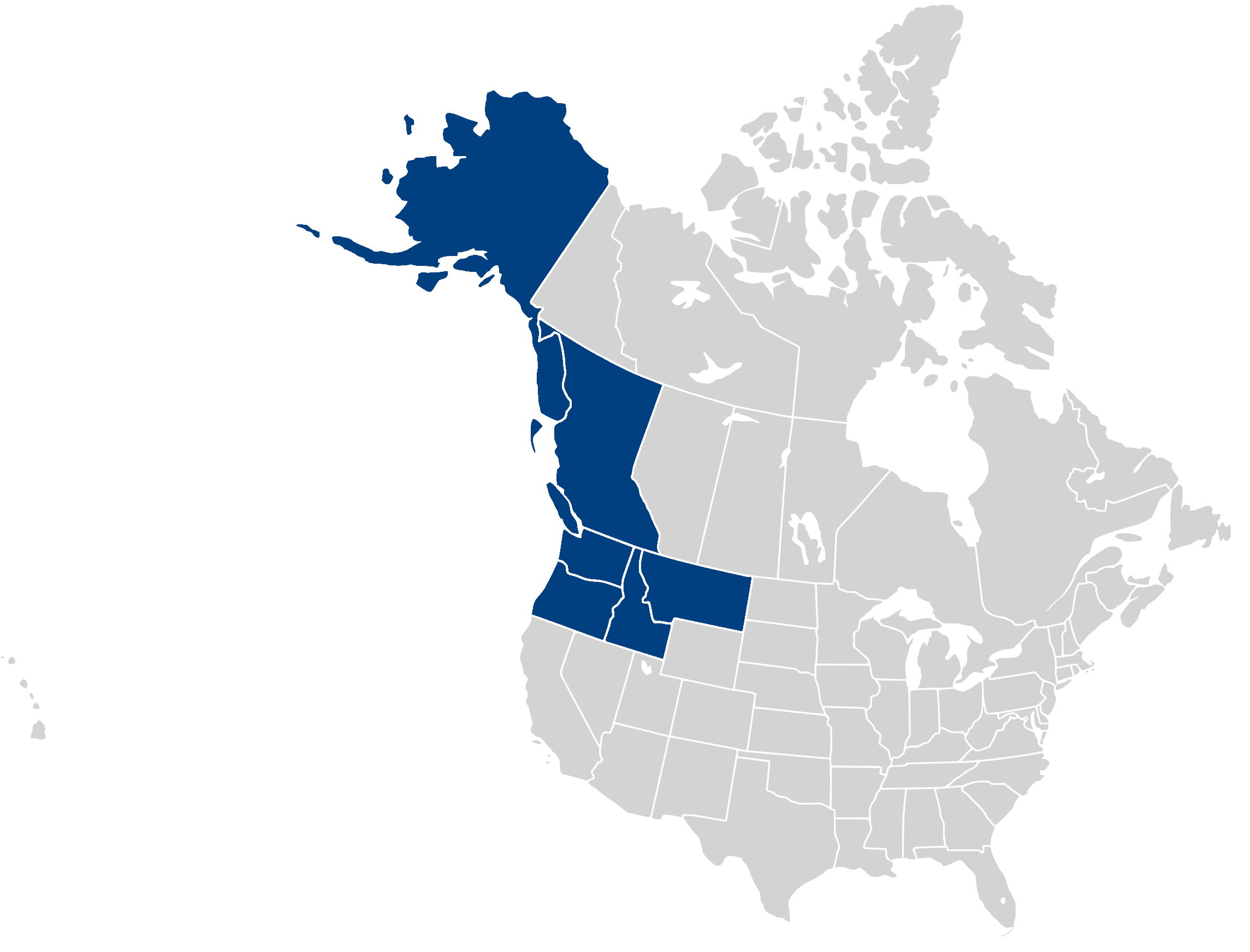

The Great Northwest Athletic Conference (GNAC) is a college athletic conference affiliated with the National Collegiate Athletic Association (NCAA) at the Division II level. It has historically operated in the northwestern United States, but also includes schools in Alaska, Montana, and British Columbia.

The GNAC is the only NCAA conference in any division with a Canadian university as a member.

== History ==
The conference formed in 2001 when its original ten members split from the Pacific West Conference.

Great Northwest Athletic Conference (Pacific Northwest)
Location of GNAC members: current, departing
Great Northwest Athletic Conference (Alaska)
Location of GNAC members: current

=== Chronological timeline ===
- 2001 – The Great Northwest Athletic Conference (GNAC) was founded. Charter members included the University of Alaska at Fairbanks, the University of Alaska at Anchorage, Central Washington University, Humboldt State University (now California State Polytechnic University, Humboldt), Northwest Nazarene University, Saint Martin's, Seattle University, Seattle Pacific University, Western Oregon University and Western Washington University, beginning the 2001-02 academic year.
- 2006 – Humboldt State left the GNAC to join the California Collegiate Athletic Association (CCAA) after the 2005-06 academic year. This would result in the GNAC dropping football, with Western Washington and Central Washington becoming football affiliates of the now defunct North Central Conference (NCC) and Western Oregon competing as a D-II Independent.
- 2007 – Montana State University at Billings joined the GNAC in the 2007-08 academic year.
- 2008 – Seattle left the GNAC to join the Division I ranks of the National Collegiate Athletic Association (NCAA) as an NCAA D-I Independent (who would later join the Western Athletic Conference (WAC), beginning the 2012-13 school year) after the 2007–08 academic year.
- 2008 – Dixie State University (now Utah Tech University) joined the GNAC as an affiliate member for football (with Humboldt State returning for that sport) with the 2008 fall season (2008-09 academic year), leading to the GNAC to begin sponsoring football once again.
- 2010 – Simon Fraser University joined the GNAC in the 2010-11 academic year, becoming the first Canadian institution of higher education.
- 2012 – Three institutions joined the GNAC as affiliate members, all effective in the 2012 fall season (2012-13 academic year):
  - Azusa Pacific University for football
  - and the University of Mary and the University of Sioux Falls for men's soccer
- 2013 – South Dakota School of Mines and Technology (South Dakota Mines) joined the GNAC as an affiliate member for men's soccer in the 2013 fall season (2013-14 academic year).
- 2014 – South Dakota Mines added football to its GNAC affiliate membership in the 2014 fall season (2014-15 academic year).
- 2015 – South Dakota Mines left the GNAC as an affiliate member for men's soccer after the 2014 fall season (2014-15 academic year).
- 2015 – Concordia University-Portland joined the GNAC in the 2015-16 academic year.
- 2016 – Dixie State and South Dakota Mines left the GNAC as affiliate members for football after the 2015 fall season (2015-16 academic year).
- 2019 – Humboldt State left the GNAC as an affiliate member for football as the school announced it was dropping the sport after the 2018 fall season (2018-19 academic year).
- 2019 – The University of California San Diego (UC San Diego) and the University of Central Oklahoma (along with Humboldt State returning for that sport), joined the GNAC as affiliate members for women's rowing in the 2020 spring season (2019-20 academic year).
- 2020 – Concordia-Portland left the GNAC as the school ceased operations after the 2019-20 academic year.
- 2020 – Azusa Pacific left the GNAC as an affiliate member for football as the school announced it was dropping the sport after the 2020 fall season (2020-21 academic year).
- 2020 – UC San Diego left the GNAC as an affiliate member for women's rowing after the 2020 spring season (2019–20 academic year), coinciding with the start of its transition to NCAA Division I.
- 2022 – Central Washington, Western Oregon and Simon Fraser, the only 3 football-sponsoring schools remaining in the GNAC, announce that they will be joining the Lone Star Conference as football affiliates after the 2021 fall season (2021-22 academic year), bringing an end to the GNAC as a football conference for a second time.
- 2025 – Simon Fraser announced their intention to pursue membership with Canada's U Sports and the Canada West Universities Athletic Association following the conclusion of the 2026-27 athletic year.
- 2027 – The University of Jamestown will join the GNAC as an affiliate member for men's soccer in the 2027 fall season (2027-28 academic year).

== Member schools ==
=== Current members ===
The GNAC currently has ten full members, all but three are public schools:

Institution	Location	Founded	Affiliation	Enrollment	Nickname	Joined (Note: Represents the calendar year when fall sports competition begins.)	Colors
University of Alaska Anchorage	Anchorage, Alaska	1954	Public	10,687	Seawolves	2001	
University of Alaska Fairbanks	Fairbanks, Alaska	1917	Public	7,451	Nanooks	2001	
Central Washington University	Ellensburg, Washington	1891	Public	8,509	Wildcats	2001	
Montana State University Billings	Billings, Montana	1927	Public	4,129	Yellowjackets	2007	
Northwest Nazarene University	Nampa, Idaho	1913	Nazarene	1,646	Nighthawks	2001	
Saint Martin's University	Lacey, Washington	1895	Catholic	1,505	Saints	2001	
Seattle Pacific University	Seattle, Washington	1891	Free Methodist	2,261	Falcons	2001	
Simon Fraser University	Burnaby, British Columbia, Canada	1965	Public	26,776	Red Leafs	2010	
Western Oregon University	Monmouth, Oregon	1856	Public	3,823	Wolves	2001	
Western Washington University	Bellingham, Washington	1893	Public	14,700	Vikings	2001	

=== Affiliate members ===
The GNAC currently has two affiliate members, both are public schools:

Institution	Location	Founded	Affiliation	Enrollment	Nickname	Joined (Note: Represents the calendar year when fall sports competition begins.)	Colors	GNAC sport	Primary conference
University of Central Oklahoma	Edmond, Oklahoma	1890	Public	12,554	Bronchos	2019		women's rowing	Mid-America (MIAA)
California State Polytechnic University, Humboldt (Note: Cal Poly Humboldt was a full member of the GNAC from 2001-02 to 2005-06, and was as an affiliate member of the GNAC for football from the 2008 to 2018 fall seasons (2008-09 to 2018-19 school years).) (Note: Formerly known as Humboldt State University until January 26, 2022.)	Arcata, California	1913	Public	6,045	Lumberjacks	2019		women's rowing	California (CCAA)

=== Future affiliate members ===
The GNAC will have one new affiliate member, a private school:

Institution	Location	Founded	Affiliation	Enrollment	Nickname	Joining (Note: Represents the calendar year when fall sports competition begins.)	Colors	GNAC sport	Primary conference
University of Jamestown	Jamestown, North Dakota	1883	Presbyterian (PCUSA)	1,372	Jimmies	2027		men's soccer	Northern Sun (NSIC)

=== Former members ===
The GNAC had three former full members, all but one were private schools:

Institution	Location	Founded	Affiliation	Enrollment	Nickname	Joined (Note: Represents the calendar year when fall sports competition begins.)	Left (Note: Represents the calendar year when spring sports competition ends.)	Current conference
Concordia University-Portland	Portland, Oregon	1905	Lutheran LCMS	N/A	Cavaliers	2015	2020	Closed in 2020
California State Polytechnic University, Humboldt (Note: Cal Poly Humboldt remains in the GNAC as an affiliate member for women's rowing.) (Note: Formerly known as Humboldt State University until January 26, 2022.)	Arcata, California	1913	Public	5,858	Lumberjacks	2001	2006	California (CCAA)
Seattle University	Seattle, Washington	1891	Jesuit	7,107	Redhawks	2001	2008	West Coast (WCC) (Note: Currently an NCAA Division I athletic conference.)

=== Former affiliate members ===
The GNAC had seven former affiliate members, all but three were public schools:

Institution	Location	Founded	Affiliation	Enrollment	Nickname	Joined (Note: Represents the calendar year when fall sports competition begins.)	Left (Note: Represents the calendar year when spring sports competition ends.)	GNAC sport	Primary conference
Azusa Pacific University	Azusa, California	1899	Evangelical; Christian	7,133	Cougars	2012	2020	football	Pacific West (PacWest)
Dixie State University (Note: Currently known as Utah Tech University.)	St. George, Utah	1911	Public	12,556	Red Storm (Note: Currently known as the Utah Tech Trailblazers.)	2008	2016	football	Western (WAC) (Note: Currently an NCAA Division I athletic conference.) (Big Sky in 2026)
California State Polytechnic University, Humboldt (Note: Cal Poly Humboldt was a full member of the GNAC from 2001-02 to 2005-06. However it remains in the GNAC as an affiliate member for women's rowing.) (Note: Formerly known as Humboldt State University until January 2022.)	Arcata, California	1913	Public	5,858	Lumberjacks	2006	2019	football	California (CCAA)
University of Mary	Bismarck, North Dakota	1959	Catholic	3,794	Marauders	2012	2016	men's soccer	Northern Sun (NSIC)
University of Sioux Falls	Sioux Falls, South Dakota	1883	Baptist	1,594	Cougars	2012	2013	men's soccer	Northern Sun (NSIC)
South Dakota School of Mines and Technology	Rapid City, South Dakota	1885	Public	2,493	Hardrockers	2014^{fb.}	2016^{fb.}	football	Rocky Mountain (RMAC)
South Dakota School of Mines and Technology	Rapid City, South Dakota	1885	Public	2,493	Hardrockers	2013^{m.soc.}	2015^{m.soc.}	men's soccer	Rocky Mountain (RMAC)
University of California, San Diego	San Diego, California	1960	Public	41,482	Tritons	2019	2020	women's rowing	Big West (BWC) (West Coast (WCC) in 2027)

=== Membership timeline ===
Full member (all sports) Full member (non-football) Associate member (football) Associate member (sport)

- The GNAC did not sponsor football during the 2006 and 2007 fall seasons (2006-07 and 2007-08 school years). Therefore, Central Washington and Western Washington competed in the North Central Conference (NCC); while Dixie State, Humboldt State and Western Oregon competed as Independents.

== Sports sponsored ==
Conference sports
Sport	Men's	Women's
Baseball	✓	
Basketball	✓	✓
Cross Country	✓	✓
Golf	✓	✓
Rowing		✓
Soccer	✓	✓
Softball		✓
Track & Field Indoor	✓	✓
Track & Field Outdoor	✓	✓
Volleyball		✓

=== Men's sponsored sports by school ===
School	Baseball	Basketball	Cross Country	Golf	Soccer	Track & Field Indoor	Track & Field Outdoor	Total GNAC Sports
Alaska		✓	✓					2
Alaska-Anchorage		✓	✓			✓	✓	4
Central Washington	✓	✓	✓			✓	✓	5
Montana State-Billings	✓	✓	✓	✓		✓	✓	6
Northwest Nazarene	✓	✓	✓	✓	✓	✓	✓	7
Saint Martin's	✓	✓	✓	✓	✓	✓	✓	7
Seattle Pacific		✓	✓		✓	✓	✓	5
Simon Fraser		✓	✓	✓	✓	✓	✓	6
Western Oregon	✓	✓	✓		✓	✓	✓	6
Western Washington		✓	✓	✓	✓	✓	✓	6
Totals	5	10	10	5	6	9	9	56

=== Women's sponsored sports by school ===
School	Basketball	Cross Country	Golf	Rowing	Soccer	Softball	Track & Field Indoor	Track & Field Outdoor	Volleyball	Total GNAC Sports
Alaska	✓	✓							✓	3
Alaska-Anchorage	✓	✓					✓	✓	✓	5
Central Washington	✓	✓			✓	✓	✓	✓	✓	7
Montana State-Billings	✓	✓	✓		✓	✓	✓	✓	✓	8
Northwest Nazarene	✓	✓	✓		✓	✓	✓	✓	✓	8
Saint Martin's	✓	✓	✓		✓	✓	✓	✓	✓	8
Seattle Pacific	✓	✓	✓	✓	✓		✓	✓	✓	8
Simon Fraser	✓	✓	✓		✓	✓	✓	✓	✓	8
Western Oregon	✓	✓			✓	✓	✓	✓	✓	7
Western Washington	✓	✓	✓	✓	✓	✓	✓	✓	✓	9
Affiliate Members
Cal Poly Humboldt				✓						1
Central Oklahoma				✓						1
Totals	10	10	6	4	8	7	9	9	10	81

=== Other sponsored sports by school ===
School	Men					Women			Co-ed	
School	Football	Ice Hockey (Note: De facto Division I sport. The NCAA holds a combined national championship event in men's ice hockey open to both Division I and Division II members, and single championship events open to members of all three divisions in women's gymnastics and the coeducational sports of rifle and skiing.)	Lacrosse	Swimming & Diving	Wrestling	Gymnastics	Swimming & Diving	Wrestling	Rifle	Skiing
Alaska		IND					PCSC		PRC	RMISA
Alaska Anchorage		IND				MPSF				RMISA
Central Washington	LSC									
Northwest Nazarene			RMAC							
Simon Fraser				RMAC	IND		RMAC	RMAC		
Western Oregon	LSC									

== Football champions ==
Year	Champion	Conf. Record
2001	Western Washington	3-0
2002	Central Washington	3-0
2003	Western Washington	3-0
2004	Central Washington	5-1
2005	Central Washington	6-0
2006	Not Sponsored	N/A
2007	Not Sponsored	N/A
2008	Central Washington	8-0
2009	Central Washington	6-0

Year	Champion	Conf. Record
2010	Central Washington	7-1
2011	Humboldt State	7-1
2012	Central Washington	7-3
2013	Azusa Pacific	9-1
2014	Azusa Pacific	6-0
2015	Humboldt State	6-0
2016	Azusa Pacific	8-0
2017	Central Washington	8-0
2018	Azusa Pacific & Central Washington	7-1
2019	Central Washington & Western Oregon	5-1
2020	Cancelled due to COVID-19 pandemic	N/A
2021	Central Washington	4-0

== Conference facilities ==
School	Basketball arena	Capacity
Alaska Fairbanks	Alaska Airlines Court	1,648
Alaska Anchorage	Alaska Airlines Center	5,000
Central Washington	Nicholson Pavilion	2,519
Montana State - Billings	Alterowitz Gymnasium	2,330
Northwest Nazarene	Johnson Sports Center	
Saint Martin's	Marcus Pavilion	4,960
Seattle Pacific	Royal Brougham Pavilion	2,650
Simon Fraser	West Gym	1,500
Western Oregon	PE Gym	2,473
Western Washington	Sam Carver Gym	2,534
