= Ron Haun =

American football coach (1943–2025)

Biographical details
- Born: April 14, 1943; Murray, Utah, U.S.
- Died: May 2, 2025 (aged 82); St. George, Utah, U.S.

Playing career

Football
- 1962–1963: Dixie (UT)
- 1964: Weber State
- Position: Quarterback

Coaching career (HC unless noted)

Football
- 1965: Weber State (assistant freshmen)
- 1966–1973: Skyline HS (UT) (RB/WR/DB)
- 1974–1978: Murray HS (UT)
- 1979–1981: Ricks (assistant)
- 1982–2001: Ricks
- 2005: Weber State (OC)
- 2006–2009: Dixie State

Basketball
- 1966–1974: Skyline HS (UT) (assistant)

Tennis
- 1967–1974: Skyline HS (UT)

Head coaching record
- Overall: 12–32 (college); 178–40–2 (junior college)
- Bowls: 0–1 (college); 10–7 (junior college)

Accomplishments and honors

Championships
- 3 ICAC (1982–1984); 8 WSFL (1986, 1990, 1992–1994, 1997–1998, 2001)

Ronald Earl Haun (April 14, 1943 – May 2, 2025) was an American college football coach. He was the head football coach for Ricks College—now known as Brigham Young University–Idaho—from 1982 to 2001 and Dixie State University—now known as Utah Tech University—from 2006 to 2009. He also coached for Weber State. He played college football for Dixie Junior College (Utah Tech) as a quarterback.

Haun attended Murray High School in Murray, Utah, where he lettered in football, basketball, and baseball before graduating in 1961. He then played football as a quarterback at Dixie College and Weber State College—now known as Weber State University. In 1966, Haun earned a master's degree from Brigham Young University (BYU). From 1966 to 1974 he taught physical education and coached football, basketball, and tennis, at Skyline High School in Millcreek, Utah. In 1974, he returned to his alma mater, Murray High School, as head football coach.

Haun died in St. George, Utah on May 2, 2025, after a lengthy battle with brain cancer. He was 82.

== Head coaching record ==
=== College ===
Year	Team	Overall	Conference	Standing	Bowl/playoffs
Dixie State Rebels (NCAA Division II Northwest Region independent) (2006–2007)
2006	Dixie State	1–10			L Dixie Rotary Bowl
2007	Dixie State	3–8			
Dixie State Rebels / Red Storm (Great Northwest Athletic Conference) (2008–2009)
2008	Dixie State	4–7	2–6	4th	
2009	Dixie State	4–7	2–4	3rd	
Dixie State:		12–32	4–10		
Total:		12–32			

=== Junior college ===
Year	Team	Overall	Conference	Standing	Bowl/playoffs
Ricks Vikings (Intermountain Collegiate Athletic Conference) (1982–1984)
1982	Ricks	7–4	4–2	T–1st	
1983	Ricks	9–2 (Note: Ricks finished the 1983 season with an overall record of 8–3 and a conference mark of 3–3, tying for second place in the Intermountain Collegiate Athletic Conference (ICAC). Following the season, Eastern Utah forfeited conference wins over Ricks and Snow, which placed Dixie, Ricks, and Snow into a three-way tie for the ICAC title.)	4–2	T–1st	
1984	Ricks	10–1	6–0	1st	L Valley of the Sun Bowl
Ricks Vikings (Western States Football League) (1985–2001)
1985	Ricks	7–3	6–3	3rd	
1986	Ricks	10–0–1	8–0–1	1st	W Kansas Jayhawk Bowl
1987	Ricks	7–4	5–4	5th	W Real Dairy Bowl
1988	Ricks	9–2	6–2	2nd	W Real Dairy Bowl
1989	Ricks	8–2–1	6–1–1	3rd	L Real Dairy Bowl
1990	Ricks	7–4	6–2	T–1st	L Real Dairy Bowl
1991	Ricks	9–2	6–2	T–2nd	W Real Dairy Bowl
1992	Ricks	11–0	8–0	1st	W Real Dairy Bowl
1993	Ricks	10–1 (Note: Ricks finished the 1993 season with an overall record of 9–2 and a conference mark of 8–1. Following the season, Dixie (UT) forfeited five conference wins, including a victory over Ricks.)	9–0	1st	L Real Dairy Bowl
1994	Ricks	11–0	8–0	1st	W Real Dairy Bowl
1995	Ricks	8–4	7–2	T–2nd	L Real Dairy Bowl
1996	Ricks	6–4	5–3	T–3rd	L Real Dairy Bowl
1997	Ricks	11–1	8–0	1st	W Real Dairy Bowl
1998	Ricks	10–1	8–0	1st	L Real Dairy Bowl
1999	Ricks	10–1	7–1	2nd	W Real Dairy Bowl
2000	Ricks	8–3	5–3	T–4th	W Real Dairy Bowl
2001	Ricks	10–1	9–1	T–1st	W Real Dairy Bowl
Ricks:		178–40–2	131–28–2		
Total:		178–40–2			
National championship Conference title Conference division title or championship game berth
