= Greg Croshaw =

American football coach

Croshaw
Current position
- Title: Head coach
- Team: St. George Eagles
- Conference: USA Collegiate

Biographical details
- Born: c. 1948 (age 77–78); Seattle, Washington, U.S.

Playing career

Football
- 1967: Yakima Valley
- 1968–1969: Weber State

Baseball
- 1970: Weber State
- Position: Linebacker (football)

Coaching career (HC unless noted)

Football
- 1971–1972: Dixie (UT) (assistant)
- 1975–1978: Snow (DC)
- 1979–1981: Northern Arizona (RB/LB)
- 1982–2005: Dixie (UT) / Dixie State
- 2007–2010: Pine View HS (UT) (DC)
- 2011: Mesa (AZ)
- 2012–2014: Cottonwood HS (UT)
- 2023–present: St. George Eagles

Head coaching record
- Overall: 13–19 (high school)
- Bowls: 17–4 (junior college)

Accomplishments and honors

Championships
- 1 ICAC (1983); 8 WSFL (1987, 1990, 1995–1996, 1999, 2001–2003)

Greg Croshaw (born c. 1948) is an American college football coach. Since 2023, he has served as head coach of the St. George Eagles, a junior college football team in St. George, Utah that is affiliated with USA Collegiate. Croshaw was the head football coach at Dixie State College—reamed from Dixie College in 2000 and now known as Utah Tech University—from 1982 to 2005 and at Mesa Community College in Mesa, Arizona for one season, in 2011.

== Early life, playing career, and education ==
Croshaw was born and raised in Seattle. He played junior college football at Yakima Valley College in Yakima, Washington, where he was team captain and most valuable player. He transferred to Weber State College—now known as Weber State University—co-captaining the Weber State Wildcats football team and twice earning all-Big Sky Conference honors. Croshaw tried out with the Green Bay Packers of the National Football League (NFL), and was offered to play professional baseball by the Pittsburgh Pirates, but went into coaching instead. He earned a master's degree from Brigham Young University (BYU) in 1975.

== Coaching career ==
Croshaw coached running backs and linebackers at Northern Arizona University from 1979 to 1981 under head coach Dwain Painter. Croshaw left Northern Arizona after Painter was fired. He was appointed head football coach at Dixie in December 1981, succeeding Lee Bunnell, who had resigned.

Croshaw was fired by Dixie State in 2006 as the program prepared to move to the four-year college level and join NCAA Division II competition. From 2007 to 2010, he was the defensive coordinator at Pine View High School in St. George. He returned to the junior college ranks for a season, in 2011, as head football coach at Mesa Community College in Mesa, Arizona. In 2012, Croshaw was hired as the head football coach at Cottonwood High School in Murray, Utah. He compiled a record of 13–19 in three seasons at Cottonwood before resigning in early 2015 due to a heart condition.

== Head coaching record ==
Year	Team	Overall	Conference	Standing	Bowl/playoffs
Dixie Rebels (Intermountain Collegiate Athletic Conference) (1982–1984)
1982	Dixie	5–5	3–3	3rd	
1983	Dixie	9–2	4–2	T–1st	W Valley of the Sun Bowl
1984	Dixie	7–4	3–3	T–2nd	
Dixie / Dixie State Rebels (Western States Football League) (1985–2005)
1985	Dixie	7–4	5–4	T–4th	W Roaring Ranger Bowl
1986	Dixie	11–1	8–1	2nd	W Dixie Rotary Bowl
1987	Dixie	11–1	8–1	1st	W Dixie Rotary Bowl
1988	Dixie	8–3	5–3	T–3rd	W Dixie Rotary Bowl
1989	Dixie	10–1	7–1	2nd	W Dixie Rotary Bowl
1990	Dixie	9–2	6–2	T–1st	W Dixie Rotary Bowl
1991	Dixie	6–5	4–4	5th	L Dixie Rotary Bowl
1992	Dixie	5–5	4–4	5th	
1993	Dixie	3–8 (Note: Dixie forfeited five conference wins.)	2–7	T–8th	L Dixie Rotary Bowl
1994	Dixie	8–2–1	5–2–1	T–2nd	W Real Dairy Bowl
1995	Dixie	10–1	8–1	1st	W Dixie Rotary Bowl
1996	Dixie	10–1	7–1	T–1st	W Dixie Rotary Bowl
1997	Dixie	11–1	7–1	2nd	W Dixie Rotary Bowl
1998	Dixie	7–5	3–5	T–3rd	W Dixie Rotary Bowl
1999	Dixie	11–1	8–0	1st	L Dixie Rotary Bowl
2000	Dixie State	8–3	5–3	T–4th	W Dixie Rotary Bowl
2001	Dixie State	11–1	9–1	T–1st	W Dixie Rotary Bowl
2002	Dixie State	10–2	9–0	1st	W Dixie Rotary Bowl
2003	Dixie State	10–2	8–1	T–1st	L Dixie Rotary Bowl
2004	Dixie State	10–2	7–2	2nd	W Dixie Rotary Bowl
2005	Dixie State	9–3	6–3	T–3rd	W Dixie Rotary Bowl
Dixie / Dixie State:		206–65–1	141–55–1		
Mesa Thunderbirds (Western States Football League) (2011)
2011	Mesa	1–10	0–7	8th	
Mesa:		1–10	0–7		
Total:		207–75–1			
National championship Conference title Conference division title or championship game berth
