= Paul Peterson (gridiron football) =

American gridiron football player and coach (born 1980)

Current position
- Title: Associate athletic director
- Team: Utah Tech
- Conference: WAC

Biographical details
- Born: July 29, 1980 (age 46); Allentown, Pennsylvania, U.S.

Playing career
- 2001–2002: Snow
- 2003–2004: Boston College
- 2005: Ottawa Renegades
- Position: Quarterback

Coaching career (HC unless noted)
- 2006: BYU (GA)
- 2007: NC State (GA)
- 2008–2009: Southern Utah (QB/WR/RC)
- 2010–2011: Southern Utah (PGC/QB/WR/RC)
- 2012–2016: Sacramento State (OC/QB)
- 2017–2018: Snow
- 2019–2023: Utah Tech / Dixie State

Administrative career (AD unless noted)
- 2023–present: Utah Tech (associate AD)

Head coaching record
- Overall: 17–32 (college); 18–4 (junior college)
- Bowls: 1–1 (junior college)

Paul Peterson (born July 29, 1980) is an American football coach and former player. He was the head football coach at Utah Tech University in St. George, Utah, from 2019 to 2023. Peterson played college football as quarterback at Boston College. He was the first Boston College quarterback to start his career 6–0, and compiled a 12–2 record for his career with the Boston College Eagles, including two bowl game victories, in the 2003 San Francisco Bowl and 2004 Continental Tire Bowl. He was named the Big East Offensive Player of the Week twice, the MVP of the Continental Tire Bowl, and BC's team MVP in 2004.

== Playing career ==
=== High school ===
Peterson was an all-state selection as junior and senior at Bingham High School in South Jordan, Utah. He holds the school's single-season record for passing yardage (2,011) and career record for passing yards (3,900). He totaled 38 touchdown passes including 20 in his senior season. He also played baseball and basketball. After high school, Peterson served a two-year Mormon mission in Nicaragua (August 1999–July 2001).

=== Junior college ===
Peterson played the 2001 and 2002 seasons at Snow College, a junior college in Ephraim, Utah. In 2001, he threw for 2,518 yards and 20 touchdowns. In 2002, he earned JC Grid-Wire All-America honors and All-Western States Football League first team honors after leading the Badgers to an 8–2 record, throwing for 2,982 yards and 35 touchdowns in 10 games. He led the National Junior College Athletic Association (NJCAA) in both passing yards and touchdowns.

=== Boston College ===
==== 2003 season ====
After starting the year as a backup, Peterson came on strong at the end of the season to win the starting quarterback job from Quinton Porter, leading the Eagles to wins in each of their last three games. He completed 16-of-25 passes for 224 yards and two touchdowns to lead the team to a 35–21 win over Colorado State in the Diamond Walnut San Francisco Bowl. He finished the season completing 84 of 147 passes for 1,124 yards, 10 touchdowns, and seven interceptions.

==== 2004 season ====
Peterson won Big East Offensive Player of the Week twice, Big East Co-Offensive Player of the Week once, and Big East Offensive Player once. He started 10 games until missing the season finale due to a fractured second metacarpal in his right (throwing) hand late in the second quarter against Temple. Peterson came back to complete 24 of 33 passes for 236 yards and two touchdowns in BC's 37–24 win over North Carolina in the Continental Tire Bowl before exiting the game in the second half with a broken leg. However, he still earned game MVP honors. Megan, his wife, picked up his trophy on the field after the game. He finished the season with 2,594 passing yards, 18 touchdowns, and 10 interceptions.

Peterson concluded his career with 3,718 yards (eighth all time), 28 touchdowns (sixth all time), and a 60.8 completion percentage (sixth all time).

=== CFL ===
Peterson signed with the Ottawa Renegades of the Canadian Football League (CFL) before the 2005 season. He was released after week 10.

== Coaching career ==
Peterson was a graduate assistant at Brigham Young University (BYU) in 2006 and at North Carolina State University in 2007. In 2008, Peterson joined Southern Utah University coaching staff as the quarterbacks and wide receivers coach. Peterson was hired as the 21st head football coach at Snow College on January 23, 2017. He then took the Head coaching position at Dixie State University on December 2, 2018.

== Personal life ==
Peterson is the sixth of ten children. His older brother, Charlie, is a former BYU quarterback who played professionally in the Arena Football League (AFL) and Canadian Football League (CFL)

== Head coaching record ==
=== College ===
Year	Team	Overall	Conference	Standing	Bowl/playoffs
Dixie State Trailblazers (Rocky Mountain Athletic Conference) (2019)
2019	Dixie State	8–3	7–3	3rd	
Dixie State Trailblazers (NCAA Division I FCS independent) (2020)
2020–21	Dixie State	2–3			
Dixie State / Utah Tech Trailblazers (Western Athletic Conference) (2021–2022)
2021	Dixie State	1–10	0–3	T–5th	
2022	Utah Tech	4–7	2–2	3rd	
Utah Tech Trailblazers (United Athletic Conference) (2023)
2023	Utah Tech	2–9	1–5	T–7th	
Dixie State / Utah Tech:		17–32	10–13		
Total:		17–32			

=== Junior college ===
Year	Team	Overall	Conference	Standing	Bowl/playoffs	NJCAA^{#}
Snow Badgers (Western States Football League) (2017–2018)
2017	Snow	10–1	6–1	2nd	W El Toro Bowl	4
2018	Snow	8–3	5–2	3rd	L Graphics Edge Bowl	9
Snow:		18–4	11–3			
Total:		18–4				
