= Walt Criner =

American football and baseball coach

Biographical details
- Born: c. 1937
- Died: June 15, 2021 (aged 84); Gardnerville, Nevada, U.S.

Playing career

Football
- 1958: Pepperdine

Baseball
- 1957–1959: Pepperdine
- Position: Quarterback (football)

Coaching career (HC unless noted)

Football
- 1970–1973: Coachella Valley HS (CA)
- 1974–1979: Desert (assistant)
- 1980–1982: Cal Poly Pomona (OL)
- 1983–1986: Snow
- 1987–1988: Idaho State (AHC/OL)
- 1989: Indio HS (CA)
- 1990–1991: Coachella Valley HS (CA)
- 1992–1995: Arizona Western

Baseball
- 1960–1971: Coachella Valley HS (CA)
- 1978–1980: Coachella Valley HS (CA)
- 2000–2002: Coachella Valley HS (CA)

Head coaching record
- Overall: 37–43 (junior college football)
- Bowls: 1–0 (junior college)

Accomplishments and honors

Championships
- Football; 1 NJCAA National (1985); 1 ICAC (1983); 1 WSFL (1985)

Walt Criner (c. 1937 – June 15, 2023) was an American football and baseball coach. He served as head football coach at Snow College in Ephraim, Utah from 1983 to 1986 and Arizona Western College in Yuma, Arizona from 1992 to 1995, compiling a career junior college football head coaching record of 37–43. He led Snow to a NJCAA National Football Championship in 1985.

Criner graduated from Coachella Valley High School in Thermal, California. His brother, Jim, also became a football coach. After playing college football and college baseball at Pepperdine University, Criner returned to Coachella Valley High School, where he coached football and baseball and taught for 21 years. In 1974, he joined the football coach staff at the College of the Desert (COD) in Palm Desert, California as offensive backfield coach under head coach Bill Reeske. Criner continued to coach baseball at Coachella Valley while working as a football assistant at COD. He also coached basketball at Coachella Valley early in his tenure as the school. In 1980, he left Coachella Valley to become an assistant football coach at California State Polytechnic University, Pomona under head football coach Roman Gabriel.

Criner succeeded Bill Kelly as head football coach at Snow in 1983. After leading his teams to a record of 26–16 in four seasons, he resigned from his post at Snow in early 1987 to become the assistant head football coach and offensive line coach at Idaho State University. Criner spent two years at Idaho State and then was the head football coach at Indio High School, in Indio, California, in 1989, leading the Rajahs to a record of 6–5. He returned again to Coachella Valley High School as head football coach in 1990.

Criner died on June 15, 2023, at his home in Gardnerville, Nevada.

== Head coaching record ==
=== Junior college football ===
Year	Team	Overall	Conference	Standing	Bowl/playoffs
Snow Badgers (Intermountain Collegiate Athletic Conference) (1983–1984)
1983	Snow	5–6	4–2	T–1st	
1984	Snow	4–6	3–3	T–2nd	
Snow Badgers (Western States Football League) (1985–1986)
1985	Snow	11–0	9–0	1st	W Mid-America Bowl
1986	Snow	6–4	6–3	4th	
Snow:		26–16	22–8		
Arizona Western Matadors (Western States Football League) (1992–1995)
1992	Arizona Western	2–7	2–6	T–6th	
1993	Arizona Western	3–6	3–6	7th	
1994	Arizona Western	3–7	3–5	7th	
1995	Arizona Western	3–7	3–6	7th	
Arizona Western:		11–27	11–23		
Total:		37–43			
National championship Conference title Conference division title or championship game berth
