= 2019 Dixie State Trailblazers football team =

American college football season

2019 Dixie State Trailblazers football
- Conference: Rocky Mountain Athletic Conference
- Record: 8–3 (7–3 RMAC)
- Head coach: Paul Peterson (1st season)
- Defensive coordinator: Tyler Almond (1st season)
- Home stadium: Greater Zion Stadium

2019 Rocky Mountain Athletic Conference football standings
	Conf.			Overall
Team	W		L	W		L
No. 8 Colorado Mines $^	10	–	0	12	–	1
No. 12 CSU Pueblo ^	9	–	1	11	–	2
Dixie State	7	–	3	8	–	3
Colorado Mesa	6	–	4	6	–	5
Chadron State	5	–	5	6	–	5
Western Colorado	5	–	5	5	–	6
Adams State	4	–	6	4	–	7
Fort Lewis	3	–	7	3	–	7
Black Hills State	2	–	8	3	–	8
South Dakota Mines	2	–	8	3	–	8
New Mexico Highlands	2	–	8	2	–	8
$ – Conference champion; ^ – NCAA Division II playoff participant; Rankings from AFCA Poll

The 2019 Dixie State Trailblazers football team represented Dixie State University (now Utah Tech University) in the 2019 NCAA Division II football season. They were led by first-year head coach Paul Peterson and played their home games at Greater Zion Stadium in St. George, Utah as a member of the Rocky Mountain Athletic Conference.

The Trailblazers' eight wins set a new program record.

== Schedule ==
Date	Time	Opponent	Site	TV	Result	Attendance
September 7	7:00 p.m.	No. 9 Colorado State–Pueblo	Trailblazer Stadium; St. George, UT	CEC-TV/ESPN Radio	L 7–36	6,512
September 14	12:00 p.m.	at Fort Lewis	Ray Dennison Memorial Field; Durango, CO	Radio Dixie 91.3	W 23–14	1,247
September 21	1:00 p.m.	at New Mexico Highlands	Sanchez Stadium; Las Vegas, NM		W 55–0	559
September 28	6:00 p.m.	at South Dakota Mines	O'Harra Stadium; Rapid City, SD	Radio Dixie 91.3	W 28–16	1,800
October 5	1:00 p.m.	Black Hills State	Trailblazer Stadium; St. George, UT	CEC-TV/Radio Dixie 91.3	W 52–22	2,845
October 12	7:00 p.m.	Simon Fraser*	Trailblazer Stadium; St. George, UT	CEC-TV/Radio Dixie 91.3	W 55–21	3,223
October 19	1:00 p.m.	at Western Colorado	Mountaineer Bowl; Gunnison, CO	Radio Dixie 91.3	W 28–20	1,232
October 26	1:00 p.m.	Chadron State^{†}	Trailblazer Stadium; St. George, UT	CEC-TV/Radio Dixie 91.3	L 27–40	3,553
November 2	1:00 p.m.	Colorado Mesa	Trailblazer Stadium; St. George, UT	CEC-TV/ESPN Radio	W 42–32	2,646
November 9	12:00 p.m.	at No. 8 Colorado Mines	Campbell Field; Golden, CO	Radio Dixie 91.3	L 27–35	3,165
November 16	12:00 p.m.	Adams State	Trailblazer Stadium; St. George, UT	CEC-TV/Radio Dixie 91.3	W 35–10	3,967
*Non-conference game; ^{†}Homecoming; Rankings from AFCA Coaches Poll released prior to the game; All times are in Mountain time
