= Intermountain Collegiate Athletic Conference =

US junior college sports conference (1936–1984)

The Intermountain Collegiate Athletic Conference (ICAC) was a junior college athletic conference composed of member schools located in the states of Colorado, Idaho, and Utah. The league was part of the National Junior College Athletic Association (NJCAA). Originally called the Intermountain Junior College Conference, the league began football competition in 1925. The conference was officially renamed as the Intermountain Junior Collegiate Athletic Conference in 1941.

== History ==
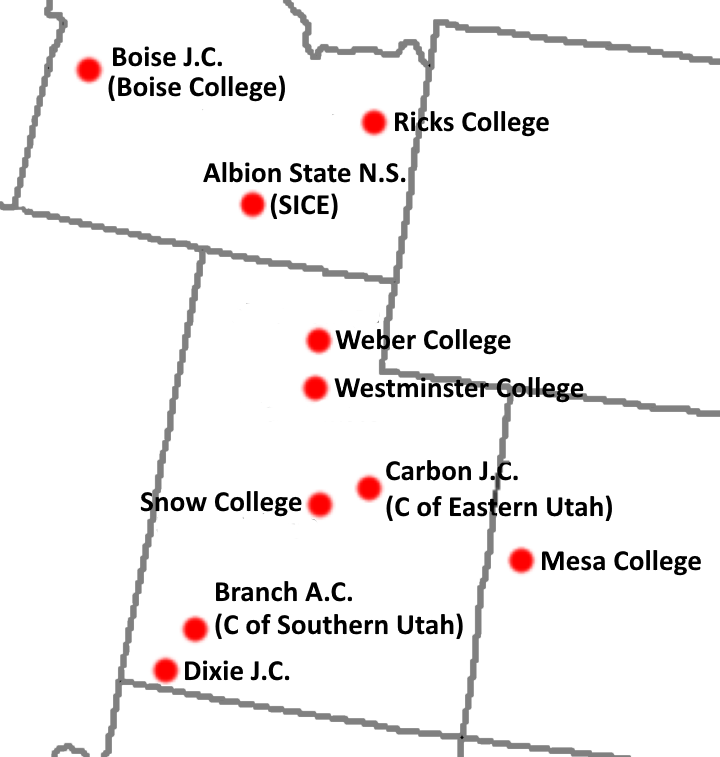
All historical members of the Intermountain Collegiate Athletic Conference.

In 1936, the conference had six members:

- Dixie Junior College (St. George, Utah)
- Ricks College (Rexburg, Idaho)
- Albion State Normal School (later the Southern Idaho College of Education [SICE]) (Albion, Idaho)
- Branch Agricultural College (later the College of Southern Utah) (Cedar City, Utah)
- Weber College (Ogden, Utah)
- Westminster College (Salt Lake City, Utah)

In 1938, Mesa College joined the league. In 1939, the league saw its largest membership when Carbon Junior College (later College of Eastern Utah) and Snow College joined. In the early 1940s, the league saw disruption due to the outbreak of World War II – Ricks and Albion were forced to leave prior to the 1941 season, while Weber and Westminster were forced to leave prior to the 1942 season. The entire league suspended operations from 1943 to 1945. In 1946, the league resumed operations with Albion and Weber also re-joining the league. Prior to 1948, Mesa left the league, while Westminster and Ricks rejoined, and a new member also joined – Boise Junior College (later Boise College).

Following this expansion, the league would see a gradual reduction in teams. 1950 would be the final season for SICE as the school closed in 1951. Westminster left the league after the 1954 season. Weber left following the 1961 season, while Southern Utah left the following year. In 1963, Mesa returned, but Eastern Utah decided to depart the league following that season. Boise left after the 1967 season, and Mesa left after the 1974 season. The league reached its final configuration in 1979 when Eastern Utah re-joined. In 1983, member schools were Eastern Utah, Dixie, Ricks, Snow, Utah Technical College at Provo (UTCP), and Colorado Northwestern Community College (CNCC).

1984 would be the final season of league play for the ICAC. In 1985, the National Junior College Athletic Association (NJCAA) realigned its regions in response to a large number of Oregon and Washington schools leaving the organization to form the Northwest Athletic Association of Community Colleges. NJCAA Region 18 was expanded to include schools in Utah, which resulted in all ICAC members being merged into the Scenic West Athletic Conference (Ricks had already been a member of the SWAC in non-football sports since 1968). For football, the league was merged with the Arizona Community College Conference to form the Western States Football League.

== Member schools ==
=== Former members ===
Institution	Location	Founded	Nickname	Colors	Joined	Left (Note: The ICAC suspended its operations for the 1943 through 1945 seasons due to World War II. Carbon, Dixie, Mesa, Snow, and Branch did not miss a season immediately before or after of this period, so their membership is considered uninterrupted.)	Today
Boise College (Boise Junior College)	Boise, Idaho	1932	Broncos		1948	1967	Now known as Boise State University. Member of NCAA Division I FBS Mountain West Conference.
Dixie Junior College	St. George, Utah	1911	Trailblazers		1936	1984	Now known as Utah Tech University. Member of NCAA Division I FCS Western Athletic Conference.
College of Eastern Utah (Carbon Junior College)	Price, Utah	1937	Eagles		1939, 1979	1963, 1984	Now known as Utah State University Eastern. Member of NJCAA Scenic West Athletic Conference.
Mesa College	Grand Junction, Colorado	1925	Mavericks		1938, 1963	1947, 1974	Now known as Colorado Mesa University. Member of NCAA Division II Rocky Mountain Athletic Conference.
Ricks College	Rexburg, Idaho	1888	Vikings		1936, 1948	1940, 1984	Now known as Brigham Young University-Idaho. Dropped intercollegiate athletics in 2002.
Snow College	Ephraim, Utah	1888	Badgers		1939	1984	Member of NJCAA Scenic West Athletic Conference (football independent).
Southern Idaho College of Education (Albion State Normal School)	Albion, Idaho	1894	Panthers		1936, 1946	1940, 1950	Closed in 1951, academic programs transferred to Idaho State University.
College of Southern Utah (Branch Agricultural College)	Cedar City, Utah	1897	Thunderbirds		1936	1962	Now known as Southern Utah University. Member of NCAA Division I FCS Western Athletic Conference.
Weber College	Ogden, Utah	1889	Wildcats		1936, 1946	1941, 1961	Now known as Weber State University. Member of NCAA Division I FCS Big Sky Conference.
Westminster College	Salt Lake City, Utah	1875	Griffins		1936, 1948	1941, 1954	Now known as Westminster University (Utah). Member of NCAA Division II Rocky Mountain Athletic Conference.

=== Membership timeline ===
Full members World War II (suspended operations)

== Champions ==
=== Football champions ===
Year	Champion(s)	Conference record	Overall record	Head coach	References
1933	Ricks	1–0–1		Clyde Packer	
1934	Westminster (UT)			Bryan Patterson	
1935	Albion State Normal; Westminster (UT)			Orville Hult; Bryan Patterson	
1936	Albion State Normal	3–0		Orville Hult	
1937	Weber			Bob Davis	
1938	Weber; Westminster (UT)	4–1–1; 4–1–1		Bob Davis; Pete Carlston	
1939	Mesa (CO)	5–1	7–1	Pete Carlston	
1940	Albion State Normal; Dixie (UT)	5–0; 4–0		Orville Hult; Jay Tolman	
1941	Mesa (CO)	4–0	8–0	Pete Carlston	
1942	Carbon	3–0	5–0	Jackson Jewkes	
1946	Mesa (CO)	5–0		Jay Tolman	
1947	Carbon	5–0		Jackson Jewkes	
1948	SICE	3–1		Gene Cooper	
1949	Boise	5–0	10–0	Lyle Smith	
1950	Boise	5–0	9–1	Lyle Smith / George Blankley	
1951	Boise	4–0	9–1	George Blankley	
1952	Boise	3–0	8–1	Lyle Smith	
1953	Boise	3–0	8–1	Lyle Smith	
1954	Boise	3–0	9–1–1	Lyle Smith	
1955	Boise	3–0	7–2	Lyle Smith	
1956	Boise; Dixie (UT)	4–0; 6–0	8–0–1; 7–1	Lyle Smith; Sark Arslanian	
1957	Boise	5–0	9–1	Lyle Smith	
1958	Boise	4–0	10–0	Lyle Smith	
1959	Weber	4–1	6–3	Wally Nalder	
1960	Boise	5–0	8–2	Lyle Smith	
1961	Boise	6–0	9–1	Lyle Smith	
1962	Snow	4–1		Bob Stoddard	
1963	Dixie (UT)	5–0	9–0	Sark Arslanian	
1964	Dixie (UT)	4–0	9–1	Sark Arslanian	
1965	Boise	4–0	9–2	Lyle Smith	
1966	Boise	4–0	9–1	Lyle Smith	
1967	Mesa (CO)	4–0	8–1–1	Jack Perrin	
1968	Dixie (UT); Mesa (CO); Ricks	2–1; 2–1; 2–1	4–4; 8–2; 6–3	Bill Slade; Jack Perrin; Charles Grant	
1969	Mesa (CO)	3–0	6–2–2	Jack Perrin	
1970	Mesa (CO)	3–0	4–6	Jack Perrin	
1971	Ricks	3–0	7–3	Don Rydalch	
1972	Snow	3–0–1		Ray Odette	
1973	Ricks	3–0	8–2	Charles Grant	
1974	Ricks	3–0	6–3	Charles Grant	
1975	Ricks	4–1	6–3	Charles Grant	
1976	Dixie (UT); Snow	2–1; 2–1	8–3; 9–2	Lee Bunnell; Dave Arslanian	
1977	Snow	3–2	7–2–1	Dave Arslanian	
1978	Snow	4–1	6–4	Dave Arslanian	
1979	Dixie (UT)	4–1–1	5–3–1	Lee Bunnell	
1980	Ricks	6–0	7–2	Ken Schmidt	
1981	Ricks	6–0	10–1	Ken Schmidt	
1982	Ricks; Snow	4–2; 4–2	7–4; 8–4	Ron Haun; Bill Kelly	
1983	Dixie (UT); Ricks; Snow	4–2; 4–2; 4–2	9–2; 9–2; 5–6	Greg Croshaw; Ron Haun; Walt Criner	
1984	Ricks	6–0	10–1	Ron Haun	

=== National champions ===
- Boise won the NJCAA National Football Championship in 1958.

== Yearly football standings ==
1933 Intermountain Junior College Conference football standings
	Conf.					Overall
Team	W		L		T	W		L		T
Ricks $	1	–	0	–	1	?	–	?	–	?
Weber	1	–	0	–	2	?	–	?	–	?
Albion State Normal	1	–	1	–	1	?	–	?	–	?
Westminster (UT)	0	–	2	–	0	6	–	3	–	1
$ – Conference champion

1938 Intermountain Junior College Conference football standings
	Conf.					Overall
Team	W		L		T	W		L		T
Weber +	4	–	1	–	1	?	–	?	–	?
Westminster (UT) +	4	–	1	–	1	?	–	?	–	?
Albion State Normal	3	–	1	–	0	?	–	?	–	?
Branch Agricultural College	1	–	1	–	1	?	–	?	–	?
Ricks	1	–	3	–	0	?	–	?	–	?
Dixie (UT)	0	–	3	–	2	?	–	?	–	?
Mesa (CO)	0	–	4	–	2	2	–	4	–	2
+ – Conference co-champions

1939 Intermountain Junior College Conference football standings
	Conf.					Overall
Team	W		L		T	W		L		T
Mesa (CO) $	5	–	1	–	0	7	–	1	–	0
Weber	4	–	1	–	1	?	–	?	–	?
Dixie (UT)	4	–	2	–	0	?	–	?	–	?
Albion State Normal	1	–	1	–	1	?	–	?	–	?
Branch Agricultural College	2	–	2	–	1	?	–	?	–	?
Ricks	2	–	2	–	0	?	–	?	–	?
Carbon	2	–	3	–	0	?	–	?	–	?
Westminster (UT)	0	–	5	–	1	?	–	?	–	?
Snow	0	–	3	–	0	?	–	?	–	?
$ – Conference champion

1940 Intermountain Junior College Conference football standings
	Conf.					Overall
Team	W		L		T	W		L		T
Albion State Normal +	5	–	0	–	0	?	–	?	–	?
Dixie (UT) +	4	–	0	–	0	?	–	?	–	?
Branch Agricultural College	3	–	2	–	0	?	–	?	–	?
Boise	1	–	1	–	0	4	–	2	–	0
Mesa (CO)	2	–	2	–	0	4	–	4	–	1
Weber	2	–	2	–	0	?	–	?	–	?
Carbon	1	–	2	–	1	?	–	?	–	?
Westminster (UT)	2	–	4	–	1	?	–	?	–	?
Ricks	0	–	3	–	0	?	–	?	–	?
Snow	0	–	4	–	0	?	–	?	–	?
+ – Conference co-champions

1941 Intermountain Collegiate Athletic Conference football standings
	Conf.					Overall
Team	W		L		T	W		L		T
Mesa (CO) $	4	–	0	–	0	8	–	0	–	0
Branch Agricultural College	4	–	2	–	0	?	–	?	–	?
Dixie (UT)	4	–	2	–	0	?	–	?	–	?
Carbon	2	–	3	–	0	?	–	?	–	?
Weber	1	–	2	–	0	?	–	?	–	?
Westminster (UT)	1	–	3	–	0	?	–	?	–	?
Snow	0	–	4	–	0	?	–	?	–	?
$ – Conference champion

1948 Intermountain Collegiate Athletic Conference football standings
	Conf.					Overall
Team	W		L		T	W		L		T
SICE $	3	–	1	–	0	?	–	?	–	?
Branch Agricultural College	3	–	1	–	1	?	–	?	–	?
Snow	3	–	1	–	1	?	–	?	–	?
Weber	2	–	2	–	0	?	–	?	–	?
Ricks	1	–	2	–	0	?	–	?	–	?
Carbon	1	–	4	–	0	?	–	?	–	?
Westminster (UT)	0	–	2	–	1	?	–	?	–	?
Dixie (UT)	0	–	3	–	1	?	–	?	–	?
Boise *	3	–	0	–	0	9	–	0	–	0
$ – Conference champion; * – Boise played insufficient games to qualify for conference title.

1949 Intermountain Collegiate Athletic Conference football standings
	Conf.					Overall
Team	W		L		T	W		L		T
Boise $	5	–	0	–	0	10	–	0	–	0
Ricks	4	–	1	–	0	6	–	1	–	0
Weber	3	–	1	–	0	5	–	4	–	0
Carbon	3	–	3	–	0	6	–	3	–	0
SICE	2	–	3	–	0	3	–	7	–	0
Snow	1	–	3	–	1	3	–	5	–	1
Branch Agricultural College	2	–	5	–	1	3	–	6	–	1
Westminster (UT)	0	–	5	–	0	2	–	5	–	0
Dixie (UT) *	2	–	1	–	0	3	–	6	–	0
$ – Conference champion; * – Dixie played insufficient games to qualify for conference race.

1950 Intermountain Collegiate Athletic Conference football standings
	Conf.					Overall
Team	W		L		T	W		L		T
Boise $	5	–	0	–	0	9	–	1	–	0
SICE	4	–	2	–	0	?	–	?	–	?
Weber	3	–	2	–	0	6	–	3	–	0
Carbon	4	–	3	–	1	?	–	?	–	?
Branch Agricultural College	3	–	3	–	0	?	–	?	–	?
Snow	3	–	3	–	0	?	–	?	–	?
Ricks	2	–	3	–	1	?	–	?	–	?
Dixie (UT)	1	–	4	–	0	?	–	?	–	?
Westminster (UT)	0	–	5	–	0	?	–	?	–	?
$ – Conference champion

1951 Intermountain Collegiate Athletic Conference football standings
	Conf.					Overall
Team	W		L		T	W		L		T
Boise $	4	–	0	–	0	9	–	1	–	0
Westminster (UT)	4	–	1	–	1	4	–	2	–	1
Weber	2	–	1	–	1	6	–	2	–	1
Branch Agricultural College	2	–	1	–	2	5	–	1	–	2
Snow	2	–	2	–	0	3	–	3	–	1
Ricks	2	–	3	–	1	2	–	4	–	1
Carbon	1	–	5	–	1	1	–	6	–	1
Dixie (UT)	1	–	5	–	0	1	–	7	–	0
$ – Conference champion

1952 Intermountain Collegiate Athletic Conference football standings
	Conf.					Overall
Team	W		L		T	W		L		T
Boise $	3	–	0	–	0	8	–	1	–	0
Ricks	6	–	1	–	0	?	–	?	–	?
Carbon	3	–	3	–	0	?	–	?	–	?
Branch Agricultural College	3	–	3	–	0	?	–	?	–	?
Westminster (UT)	3	–	4	–	0	?	–	?	–	?
Weber	3	–	3	–	0	?	–	?	–	?
Dixie (UT)	1	–	4	–	0	?	–	?	–	?
Snow	1	–	4	–	0	?	–	?	–	?
$ – Conference champion

1953 Intermountain Collegiate Athletic Conference football standings
	Conf.					Overall
Team	W		L		T	W		L		T
Boise $	3	–	0	–	0	8	–	1	–	0
Ricks	5	–	1	–	0	?	–	?	–	?
Snow	4	–	1	–	0	?	–	?	–	?
Southern Utah	2	–	2	–	0	?	–	?	–	?
Westminster (UT)	3	–	4	–	0	?	–	?	–	?
Weber	1	–	3	–	0	?	–	?	–	?
Carbon	1	–	4	–	0	?	–	?	–	?
Dixie (UT)	0	–	4	–	0	?	–	?	–	?
$ – Conference champion

1954 Intermountain Collegiate Athletic Conference football standings
	Conf.					Overall
Team	W		L		T	W		L		T
Boise $	3	–	0	–	1	9	–	1	–	1
Southern Utah	6	–	1	–	0	?	–	?	–	?
Ricks	5	–	1	–	1	?	–	?	–	?
Carbon	3	–	2	–	0	?	–	?	–	?
Snow	2	–	4	–	0	?	–	?	–	?
Weber	1	–	3	–	0	?	–	?	–	?
Westminster (UT)	1	–	5	–	0	?	–	?	–	?
Dixie (UT)	0	–	5	–	0	?	–	?	–	?
$ – Conference champion

1955 Intermountain Collegiate Athletic Conference football standings
	Conf.					Overall
Team	W		L		T	W		L		T
Boise $	3	–	0	–	0	7	–	2	–	0
Ricks	5	–	1	–	0	?	–	?	–	?
Snow	3	–	1	–	0	?	–	?	–	?
Southern Utah	2	–	4	–	0	3	–	5	–	0
Weber	1	–	2	–	0	?	–	?	–	?
Dixie (UT)	1	–	4	–	0	?	–	?	–	?
Carbon	1	–	4	–	0	?	–	?	–	?
$ – Conference champion

1956 Intermountain Collegiate Athletic Conference football standings
	Conf.					Overall
Team	W		L		T	W		L		T
Dixie (UT) +	6	–	0	–	0	7	–	1	–	0
Boise +	4	–	0	–	0	8	–	0	–	1
Carbon	2	–	2	–	1	2	–	6	–	1
Ricks	2	–	3	–	1	?	–	?	–	?
Weber	1	–	2	–	0	?	–	?	–	?
Southern Utah	1	–	5	–	0	?	–	?	–	?
Snow	0	–	4	–	0	?	–	?	–	?
+ – Conference co-champions

1957 Intermountain Collegiate Athletic Conference football standings
	Conf.					Overall
Team	W		L		T	W		L		T
Boise $	5	–	0	–	0	9	–	1	–	0
Southern Utah	4	–	1	–	0	5	–	4	–	0
Dixie (UT)	2	–	2	–	1	?	–	?	–	?
Carbon	2	–	3	–	1	2	–	7	–	1
Weber	2	–	3	–	0	?	–	?	–	?
Snow	2	–	3	–	0	?	–	?	–	?
Ricks	0	–	5	–	0	?	–	?	–	?
$ – Conference champion

1958 Intermountain Collegiate Athletic Conference football standings
	Conf.					Overall
Team	W		L		T	W		L		T
Boise $	4	–	0	–	0	10	–	0	–	0
Dixie (UT)	3	–	1	–	1	4	–	4	–	1
Southern Utah	2	–	2	–	1	3	–	3	–	2
Ricks	2	–	2	–	1	3	–	4	–	1
Snow	2	–	2	–	1	3	–	5	–	1
Weber	2	–	3	–	0	4	–	6	–	0
Carbon	0	–	6	–	0	0	–	9	–	0
$ – Conference champion

1959 Intermountain Collegiate Athletic Conference football standings
	Conf.					Overall
Team	W		L		T	W		L		T
Weber $	4	–	1	–	0	6	–	3	–	0
Boise	3	–	1	–	0	7	–	2	–	1
Dixie (UT)	3	–	1	–	0	4	–	5	–	0
Southern Utah	3	–	1	–	0	3	–	6	–	0
Carbon	2	–	4	–	0	2	–	6	–	1
Ricks	1	–	4	–	0	2	–	6	–	0
Snow	1	–	5	–	0	1	–	7	–	0
$ – Conference champion

1960 Intermountain Collegiate Athletic Conference football standings
	Conf.					Overall
Team	W		L		T	W		L		T
Boise $	5	–	0	–	0	8	–	2	–	0
Weber	4	–	2	–	0	6	–	4	–	0
Southern Utah	3	–	3	–	0	3	–	6	–	0
Snow	2	–	3	–	0	6	–	3	–	0
Carbon	2	–	4	–	0	5	–	5	–	0
Dixie (UT)	2	–	4	–	0	2	–	6	–	0
Ricks	2	–	4	–	0	2	–	7	–	0
$ – Conference champion

1961 Intermountain Collegiate Athletic Conference football standings
	Conf.					Overall
Team	W		L		T	W		L		T
Boise $	6	–	0	–	0	9	–	1	–	0
Weber	4	–	1	–	1	7	–	2	–	1
Carbon	3	–	3	–	0	?	–	?	–	?
Ricks	2	–	3	–	1	?	–	?	–	?
Snow	2	–	3	–	1	?	–	?	–	?
Dixie (UT)	2	–	4	–	0	2	–	7	–	0
Southern Utah	0	–	5	–	1	?	–	?	–	?
$ – Conference champion

1962 Intermountain Collegiate Athletic Conference football standings
	Conf.					Overall
Team	W		L		T	W		L		T
Snow $	4	–	1	–	0	4	–	5	–	0
Boise	3	–	1	–	0	5	–	2	–	2
Southern Utah	2	–	1	–	1	3	–	5	–	1
Dixie (UT)	2	–	3	–	0	6	–	4	–	0
Ricks	1	–	3	–	1	3	–	4	–	1
Carbon	1	–	4	–	0	2	–	7	–	0
$ – Conference champion

1963 Intermountain Collegiate Athletic Conference football standings
	Conf.					Overall
Team	W		L		T	W		L		T
Dixie (UT) $	5	–	0	–	0	9	–	0	–	0
Boise	3	–	2	–	0	5	–	3	–	1
Mesa (CO)	2	–	2	–	1	3	–	6	–	1
Snow	2	–	3	–	0	5	–	4	–	0
Carbon	1	–	3	–	1	1	–	6	–	1
Ricks	1	–	4	–	0	3	–	6	–	0
$ – Conference champion

1964 Intermountain Collegiate Athletic Conference football standings
	Conf.					Overall
Team	W		L		T	W		L		T
Dixie (UT) $	4	–	0	–	0	9	–	1	–	0
Boise	3	–	1	–	0	8	–	2	–	0
Snow	2	–	2	–	0	?	–	?	–	?
Ricks	1	–	3	–	0	?	–	?	–	?
Mesa (CO)	0	–	4	–	0	1	–	8	–	0
$ – Conference champion

1965 Intermountain Collegiate Athletic Conference football standings
	Conf.					Overall
Team	W		L		T	W		L		T
Boise $	4	–	0	–	0	9	–	1	–	0
Snow	3	–	1	–	0	5	–	4	–	0
Dixie (UT)	2	–	2	–	0	5	–	4	–	0
Mesa (CO)	1	–	3	–	0	2	–	6	–	1
Ricks	0	–	4	–	0	1	–	8	–	0
$ – Conference champion; Dixie and Ricks played a second game on November 13 that did not count in the conference standings.

1966 Intermountain Collegiate Athletic Conference football standings
	Conf.					Overall
Team	W		L		T	W		L		T
Boise $	4	–	0	–	0	9	–	1	–	0
Ricks	3	–	1	–	0	4	–	4	–	0
Mesa (CO)	2	–	2	–	0	5	–	4	–	0
Dixie (UT)	1	–	3	–	0	3	–	5	–	0
Snow	0	–	4	–	0	2	–	7	–	0
$ – Conference champion

1967 Intermountain Collegiate Athletic Conference football standings
	Conf.					Overall
Team	W		L		T	W		L		T
Mesa (CO) $	4	–	0	–	0	8	–	1	–	1
Boise	2	–	2	–	0	6	–	4	–	0
Ricks	2	–	2	–	0	?	–	?	–	?
Dixie (UT)	1	–	3	–	0	?	–	?	–	?
Snow	1	–	3	–	0	?	–	?	–	?
$ – Conference champion

1968 Intermountain Collegiate Athletic Conference football standings
	Conf.					Overall
Team	W		L		T	W		L		T
Mesa (CO) +	2	–	1	–	0	8	–	2	–	0
Ricks +	2	–	1	–	0	6	–	3	–	0
Dixie (UT) +	2	–	1	–	0	4	–	4	–	0
Snow	0	–	3	–	0	0	–	9	–	0
+ – Conference co-champions

1969 Intermountain Collegiate Athletic Conference football standings
	Conf.					Overall
Team	W		L		T	W		L		T
Mesa (CO) $	3	–	0	–	0	6	–	2	–	2
Ricks	2	–	1	–	0	4	–	5	–	0
Snow	1	–	2	–	0	2	–	7	–	0
Dixie (UT)	0	–	3	–	0	2	–	7	–	0
$ – Conference champion

1970 Intermountain Collegiate Athletic Conference football standings
	Conf.					Overall
Team	W		L		T	W		L		T
Mesa (CO) $	3	–	0	–	0	4	–	6	–	0
Ricks	2	–	1	–	0	5	–	4	–	0
Snow	1	–	2	–	0	4	–	5	–	1
Dixie (UT)	0	–	3	–	0	?	–	?	–	?
$ – Conference champion

1971 Intermountain Collegiate Athletic Conference football standings
	Conf.					Overall
Team	W		L		T	W		L		T
Ricks $	3	–	0	–	0	7	–	3	–	0
Dixie (UT)	1	–	2	–	0	5	–	4	–	0
Snow	1	–	3	–	0	?	–	?	–	?
$ – Conference champion

1972 Intermountain Collegiate Athletic Conference football standings
	Conf.					Overall
Team	W		L		T	W		L		T
Snow $	3	–	0	–	1	?	–	?	–	?
Dixie (UT)	2	–	2	–	0	?	–	?	–	?
Mesa (CO)	1	–	1	–	1	4	–	3	–	2
Ricks	0	–	3	–	0	?	–	?	–	?
$ – Conference champion

1973 Intermountain Collegiate Athletic Conference football standings
	Conf.					Overall
Team	W		L		T	W		L		T
Ricks $	3	–	0	–	0	8	–	2	–	0
Mesa (CO)	2	–	1	–	0	3	–	6	–	0
Dixie (UT)	2	–	2	–	0	5	–	4	–	0
Snow	0	–	4	–	0	1	–	8	–	0
$ – Conference champion

1974 Intermountain Collegiate Athletic Conference football standings
	Conf.					Overall
Team	W		L		T	W		L		T
Ricks $	3	–	0	–	0	6	–	3	–	0
Dixie (UT)	2	–	2	–	0	5	–	4	–	0
Snow	2	–	2	–	0	?	–	?	–	?
Mesa (CO)	0	–	3	–	0	1	–	7	–	1
$ – Conference champion

1975 Intermountain Collegiate Athletic Conference football standings
	Conf.					Overall
Team	W		L		T	W		L		T
Ricks $	4	–	1	–	0	6	–	3	–	0
Dixie (UT)	?	–	?	–	0	4	–	6	–	0
Snow	?	–	?	–	?	?	–	?	–	?
$ – Conference champion; Games against the junior varsity teams of BYU, Utah, and Utah State counted in the conference standings.

1976 Intermountain Collegiate Athletic Conference football standings
	Conf.					Overall
Team	W		L		T	W		L		T
Snow +	2	–	1	–	0	9	–	2	–	0
Dixie (UT) +	2	–	1	–	0	8	–	3	–	0
Ricks	0	–	2	–	0	3	–	5	–	0
+ – Conference co-champions

1977 Intermountain Collegiate Athletic Conference football standings
	Conf.					Overall
Team	W		L		T	W		L		T
Snow $	3	–	2	–	0	7	–	2	–	1
Ricks	2	–	3	–	0	4	–	6	–	0
Dixie (UT)	1	–	4	–	0	4	–	6	–	0
$ – Conference champion; Games against the junior varsity team of BYU counted in the conference standings.

1978 Intermountain Collegiate Athletic Conference football standings
	Conf.					Overall
Team	W		L		T	W		L		T
Snow $	4	–	1	–	0	6	–	4	–	0
Dixie (UT)	3	–	2	–	0	4	–	5	–	0
Ricks	?	–	?	–	?	?	–	?	–	?
$ – Conference champion; Games against the junior varsity team of Utah counted in the conference standings.

1979 Intermountain Collegiate Athletic Conference football standings
	Conf.					Overall
Team	W		L		T	W		L		T
Dixie (UT) $	4	–	1	–	1	5	–	3	–	1
Snow	3	–	2	–	1	4	–	4	–	2
Ricks	3	–	3	–	0	4	–	6	–	0
Eastern Utah	1	–	5	–	0	1	–	8	–	0
+ – Conference co-champions

1980 Intermountain Collegiate Athletic Conference football standings
	Conf.					Overall
Team	W		L		T	W		L		T
Ricks $	6	–	0	–	0	7	–	2	–	0
Snow	4	–	2	–	0	5	–	5	–	0
Dixie (UT)	1	–	5	–	0	1	–	8	–	0
Eastern Utah	1	–	5	–	0	1	–	8	–	0
+ – Conference co-champions

1981 Intermountain Collegiate Athletic Conference football standings
	Conf.					Overall
Team	W		L		T	W		L		T
Ricks $	6	–	0	–	0	10	–	1	–	0
Snow	4	–	2	–	0	9	–	2	–	1
Dixie (UT)	2	–	4	–	0	3	–	6	–	0
Eastern Utah	0	–	6	–	0	1	–	8	–	0
+ – Conference co-champions

1982 Intermountain Collegiate Athletic Conference football standings
	Conf.					Overall
Team	W		L		T	W		L		T
Snow +	4	–	2	–	0	8	–	4	–	0
Ricks +	4	–	2	–	0	7	–	4	–	0
Dixie (UT)	3	–	3	–	0	5	–	5	–	0
Eastern Utah	1	–	5	–	0	2	–	7	–	0
+ – Conference co-champions

1983 Intermountain Collegiate Athletic Conference football standings
	Conf.					Overall
Team	W		L		T	W		L		T
Dixie (UT) +	4	–	2	–	0	9	–	2	–	0
Ricks +	4	–	2	–	0	9	–	2	–	0
Snow +	4	–	2	–	0	5	–	6	–	0
Eastern Utah *	0	–	6	–	0	0	–	9	–	0
+ – Conference co-champions; * – Eastern Utah forfeited two conference games, against Ricks and Snow, and two non-conference games, against Eastern Arizona and Mesa (AZ), due to an ineligible player.

1984 Intermountain Collegiate Athletic Conference football standings
	Conf.					Overall
Team	W		L		T	W		L		T
Ricks $	6	–	0	–	0	10	–	1	–	0
Dixie (UT)	3	–	3	–	0	7	–	4	–	0
Snow	3	–	3	–	0	4	–	6	–	0
Eastern Utah	0	–	6	–	0	?	–	?	–	?
$ – Conference champion
