= Sark Arslanian =

American football coach

Biographical details
- Born: February 4, 1924; Fresno, California, U.S.
- Died: December 11, 2016 (aged 92); St. George, Utah, U.S.

Playing career

Football
- c. 1948: Dixie (UT)

Basketball
- c. 1948: Dixie (UT)

Track and field
- c. 1948: Dixie (UT)

Coaching career (HC unless noted)

Football
- 1952–1953: Central JHS (UT)
- 1954: Union High School (UT)
- 1955–1964: Dixie (UT)
- 1965–1972: Weber State
- 1973–1981: Colorado State
- 1998–2000: Pine View HS (UT)

Basketball
- 1954–1955: Union High School (UT) (assistant)

Administrative career (AD unless noted)
- ?–1965: Dixie (UT)

Head coaching record
- Overall: 95–73–6 (college)

Accomplishments and honors

Championships
- 3 ICAC (1956, 1963–1964); 2 Big Sky (1965, 1968)

Sarkis "Sark" Arslanian (February 4, 1924 – December 11, 2016) was an American college football coach. He served as the head football coach at Weber State College—now known as Weber State University—from 1965 to 1972 and Colorado State University from 1973 to 1981, compiling a career college football head coaching record of 95–73–6 (.563). Arslanian was also the head football coach at Dixie Junior College—now known as Utah Tech University—from 1955 to 1964.

== Early life, military service, and playing career ==
Arslanian was born on February 4, 1924, in Fresno, California, to Kevork and Freida (Aposhian) Arslanian, immigrants from Armenia. He graduated in 1941 from Granite High School in South Salt Lake, Utah. Arslanian served in the United States Navy in the South Pacific during World War II. After the war, he attended Dixie Junior College, where received all-conference honors in football, basketball, and track and field before graduating in 1949.

== Coaching career ==
Arslanian began his coaching career in 1952 at Central Junior High School in Salt Lake City. In 1954, he was the head football coach at Union High School in Roosevelt, Utah, leading his team to a record of 9–1–1 in his lone season there.

Beginning in 1955, Arslanian spent ten seasons as the head football coach at Dixie Junior College. His 1963 Dixie team went undefeated, and his 1964 team had a record of 9–1. Arslanian also served as the athletic director at Dixie.

In 1965, he was hired as the head football coach at Weber State College in the Big Sky Conference, where he coached through 1972 and was the winningest coach in school history. He left Weber State in 1973 for Colorado State University of the Western Athletic Conference (WAC). His 1977 Colorado State Rams football team was one of the most successful in school history, finishing 9–2–1 and receiving votes in the final AP poll. Arslanian was fired six games into the 1981 season. The team defensive coordinator, Chester Caddas, was appointed interim head coach for the remainder of the season.

After a long and successful career as a football coach at the collegiate and professional levels, he helped establish a winning tradition at Pine View High School in St. George, Utah. After a bypass surgery, he resigned as head coach of Pine View and began coaching eighth graders at Pine View Middle School. As of 2007, Arslanian was the oldest active football coach in the United States. An Armenian-American, Arslanian once traveled to Armenia to establish an American football league in his ancestral country.

== Family, honors, and death ==
Arslanian's son, Dave Arslanian, was the head footoball coach at Weber State from 1989 to 1997, assisted by his brother, Paul Arslanian. On September 14, 2013, the field at Hansen Stadium on the campus of Dixie State University was named Sark Arslanian Field. Arslanian died on December 11, 2016, at the age of 92.

== Head coaching record ==
=== College ===
Year	Team	Overall	Conference	Standing
Weber State Wildcats (Big Sky Conference) (1965–1972)
1965	Weber State	8–1	3–1	T–1st
1966	Weber State	6–3	2–2	3rd
1967	Weber State	6–4	2–2	T–2nd
1968	Weber State	7–2	3–1	T–1st
1969	Weber State	6–4	3–1	2nd
1970	Weber State	5–5–1	3–3	T–3rd
1971	Weber State	7–2–1	3–2–1	4th
1972	Weber State	5–5	2–4	6th
Weber State:		50–26–2	21–16–1	
Colorado State Rams (Western Athletic Conference) (1973–1981)
1973	Colorado State	5–6	2–4	8th
1974	Colorado State	4–6–1	2–3–1	6th
1975	Colorado State	6–5	4–2	3rd
1976	Colorado State	6–5	2–4	7th
1977	Colorado State	9–2–1	5–2	3rd
1978	Colorado State	5–6	2–4	T–5th
1979	Colorado State	4–7–1	3–4	T–5th
1980	Colorado State	6–4–1	5–1–1	2nd
1981	Colorado State	0–6 (Note: Arslanian was fired after the first six games of the 1981 season. Chester Caddas was appointed interim head coach for the remainder of the season. Colorado State finished the year 0–12 overall and 0–8 in conference play, placing last out of nine teams in the Western Athletic Conference.)	0–3	
Colorado State:		45–47–4	25–27–2	
Total:		95–73–6		
National championship Conference title Conference division title or championship game berth

=== Junior college ===
Year	Team	Overall	Conference	Standing	Bowl/playoffs
Dixie Rebels (Intermountain Collegiate Athletic Conference) (1955–1964)
1955	Dixie		1–4	T–6th	
1956	Dixie	7–1	6–0	T–1st	
1957	Dixie		2–2–1	3rd	
1958	Dixie	4–4–1	3–1–1	2nd	
1959	Dixie	4–5	3–1	T–2nd	
1960	Dixie	2–6	2–4	T–5th	
1961	Dixie	2–7	2–4	6th	
1962	Dixie	6–4	2–3	4th	
1963	Dixie	9–0	5–0	1st	
1964	Dixie	9–1	4–0	1st	
Dixie:			30–19–2		
Total:					
National championship Conference title Conference division title or championship game berth
