= Joe Peterson =

American university administrator

Joe Peterson is an American university administrator. In the summer of 2010, he was appointed as the first Chancellor of the Utah State University - College of Eastern Utah.

Peterson was born in San Juan County, Utah and raised in Carbon County, Utah. These are the two counties that have USU Eastern campuses. He holds bachelor's and master's degrees from Brigham Young University and a Ph.D. from the University of Nevada, Reno.

Peterson began his career as an English professor at Utah State University. He then taught at Dixie State College and later served as dean of Arts, Letters and Sciences. At the time of his appointment as chancellor of USU Eastern Peterson was serving as vice president for Instruction of Salt Lake Community College.

== Sources ==
- announcement of Peterson's appointment as Chancellor
- Higher Education Utah article on Peterson's appointment
