= List of United States technological universities =

In the United States, technological universities, institutes of technology, and polytechnics are tertiary education institutions that primarily focus on the applied sciences and engineering.

Technological education accelerated after World War II, when technical institutes and engineering-technology programs were promoted as part of a broader need for scientifically-trained technical personnel to compete with Soviet technological advancement during the Cold War in fields such as space flight, aeronautics, and nuclear weapons for the space race and the nuclear arms race between the US and USSR.

This list includes United States universities and colleges that are commonly identified with technological, polytechnic, or engineering-focused higher education.

== Institutions ==
School	Location	Founded	Type	Enrollment	Endowment (millions USD)	Carnegie Classification
Air Force Institute of Technology	Wright-Patterson AFB, Ohio	1919	Public	860	–	Doctoral Universities: Moderate Research Activity
California Institute of Technology	Pasadena, California	1891	Private not-for-profit	2,209	$4,317	Doctoral Universities: Highest Research Activity
California Polytechnic State University, San Luis Obispo	San Luis Obispo, California	1901	Public	20,186	$335.8	Master's Colleges & Universities: Larger Programs
California State Polytechnic University, Humboldt	Arcata, California	1913 (Note: Cal Poly Humboldt was renamed from Humboldt State University and established as a polytechnic university in 2022)	Public	6,431	$46.7	Master's Colleges and Universities: Medium Programs
California State Polytechnic University, Pomona	Pomona, California	1938	Public	23,966	$203.8	Master's Colleges & Universities: Larger Programs
Capitol Technology University	South Laurel, Maryland	1927	Private not-for-profit	1,065	$0.005	Doctoral/Professional Universities
Carnegie Mellon University	Pittsburgh, Pennsylvania	1900	Private	16,676	$4,290	Doctoral Universities: Very High Research Spending and Doctorate Production
Clarkson University	Potsdam, New York	1896	Private not-for-profit	3,873	$214	Doctoral Universities: Moderate Research Activity
Colorado School of Mines	Golden, Colorado	1874	Public	5,962	$463.3	Doctoral Universities: Higher Research Activity
Colorado Technical University	Colorado Springs, Colorado	1965	Private for-profit	25,794	$0.1	Doctoral Universities: Moderate Research Activity
Florida Institute of Technology	Melbourne, Florida	1958	Private not-for-profit	6,393	$112.6	Doctoral Universities: Higher Research Activity
Florida Polytechnic University	Lakeland, Florida	2012	Public	1,427	$5.25	Baccalaureate Colleges: Diverse Fields
Franklin W. Olin College of Engineering	Needham, Massachusetts	1997	Private not-for-profit	402	$421	Special Focus Four-Year: Engineering Schools
Georgia Institute of Technology	Atlanta, Georgia	1885	Public	23,109	$3,507	Doctoral Universities: Highest Research Activity
Harrisburg University of Science and Technology	Harrisburg, Pennsylvania	2001	Private not-for-profit	3,997	$0.001	Master's Colleges & Universities: Small Programs
Harvey Mudd College	Claremont, California	1955	Private not-for-profit	1,215	$499.7	Doctoral Universities: Higher Research Activity
Illinois Institute of Technology	Chicago, Illinois	1890	Private not-for-profit	7,898	$0.235	Doctoral Universities: Higher Research Activity
Indiana Institute of Technology	Fort Wayne, Indiana	1930	Private not-for-profit	7,192	$165.9	Special Focus Four-Year: Business & Management Schools
Iowa State University of Science and Technology	Ames, Iowa	1858	Public	34,435	$1,915	Doctoral Universities: Highest Research Activity
Kettering University	Flint, Michigan	1919	Private non-profit	2,327	$0.085	Master's Colleges and Universities
Lawrence Technological University	Southfield, Michigan	1932	Private not-for-profit	4,015	$0.047	Master's Colleges & Universities: Larger Programs
Louisiana Tech University	Ruston, Louisiana	1894	Public	11,225	–	Doctoral Universities: Moderate Research Activity
Massachusetts Institute of Technology	Cambridge, Massachusetts	1861	Private not-for-profit	11,319	$27,366	Doctoral Universities: Highest Research Activity
Michigan Technological University	Houghton, Michigan	1885	Public	7,099	$184.15	Doctoral Universities: Higher Research Activity
Milwaukee School of Engineering	Milwaukee, Wisconsin	1903	Private not-for-profit	2,729	$100.5	Master's Colleges & Universities: Small Programs
Missouri University of Science and Technology	Rolla, Missouri	1870	Public	8,640	–	Doctoral Universities: Higher Research Activity
Montana Technological University	Butte, Montana	1900	Public	2,085	$101.6	Baccalaureate Colleges: Diverse Fields
New England Institute of Technology	East Greenwich, Rhode Island	1940	Private not-for-profit	1,850	–	Master's Colleges & Universities: Smaller Programs
New Jersey Institute of Technology	Newark, New Jersey	1881	Public	11,518	$203.45	Doctoral Universities: Highest Research Activity
New Mexico Institute of Mining and Technology	Socorro, New Mexico	1889	Public	2,127	–	Master's Colleges & Universities: Small Programs
New York Institute of Technology	Old Westbury, New York	1955	Private, not-for-profit	7,872	–	Master's Colleges & Universities: Larger Programs
Oregon Institute of Technology	Klamath Falls, Oregon	1947	Public	4,260	–	Baccalaureate Colleges: Diverse Fields
Polytechnic University of Puerto Rico	Hato Rey, San Juan, Puerto Rico	1966	Private not-for-profit	4,439	–	Master's Colleges & Universities
Rensselaer Polytechnic Institute	Troy, New York	1824	Private not-for-profit	6,835	$1,024	Doctoral Universities: Higher Research Activity
Rochester Institute of Technology	Henrietta, New York	1829	Private not-for-profit	16,310	$1,463	Doctoral Universities: Higher Research Activity
Rose–Hulman Institute of Technology	Terre Haute, Indiana	1874	Private not-for-profit	2,388	$324.1	Special Focus Four-Year: Engineering Schools
South Dakota School of Mines and Technology	Rapid City, South Dakota	1885	Public	2,798	–	Special Focus Four-Year: Engineering Schools
State University of New York Polytechnic Institute	Utica, New York	1966	Public	2,856	–	Master's Colleges and Universities
Stevens Institute of Technology	Hoboken, New Jersey	1870	Private not-for-profit	6,125	$387.7	Doctoral Universities: Higher Research Activity
Tennessee Technological University	Cookeville, Tennessee	1915	Public	10,180	$120.45	Doctoral Universities: Higher Research Activity
Texas A&M University	College Station, Texas	1876	Public	79,114	$19,110	Doctoral Universities: Highest Research Activity
Texas Tech University	Lubbock, Texas	1923	Public	35,158	$3,069	Doctoral Universities: Highest Research Activity
University of Wisconsin–Stout Polytechnic	Menomonie, Wisconsin	1891	Public	9,394	$0.047	Doctoral and Master's University: Moderate Research Activity
Utah Tech University	St. George, Utah	1911	Public	12,266	–	Baccalaureate/Associate's College
Virginia Polytechnic Institute and State University	Blacksburg, Virginia	1872	Public	31,224	$0.818	Doctoral Universities: Highest Research Activity
Wentworth Institute of Technology	Boston, Massachusetts	1904	Private not-for-profit	3,965	$0.150	Master's Colleges & Universities: Smaller Programs
Worcester Polytechnic Institute	Worcester, Massachusetts	1865	Private not-for-profit	6,381	$0.436	Doctoral Universities: Higher Research Activity
