= Bill Kelly (American football, born 1947) =

American football player and coach (1947–2023)

Biographical details
- Born: June 28, 1947; Goldsboro, North Carolina, U.S.
- Died: May 13, 2023 (aged 75)
- Education: University of Richmond

Playing career

Football
- 1965–1969: North Carolina
- Positions: Wide receiver, running back, kick returner

Coaching career (HC unless noted)

Football
- 1971–1974: Richmond (assistant)
- 1976–1978: Pleasant Grove HS (UT)
- 1979–1980: Snow (assistant)
- 1981–1982: Snow
- 1983–1984: Eastern New Mexico
- 1985–1987: West Texas State

Track and field
- 1980: Snow

Head coaching record
- Overall: 31–20–2 (college football); 17–6–1 (junior college football); 17–12 (high school football)
- Bowls: 2–0 (junior college)
- Tournaments: 0–1 (NAIA D-I playoffs)

Accomplishments and honors

Championships
- Football; 1 ICAC (1982); 1 LSC (1986)

Awards
- Football; MVC Coach of the Year (1985); LSC Coach of the Year (1986)

Bill Kelly (June 28, 1947 – May 13, 2023) was an American football player and coach. He served as the head football coach at Eastern New Mexico University from 1983 to 1984 and West Texas State University—now known as West Texas A&M University—from 1985 to 1987, compiling a career college football head coaching record of 31–20–2. Kelly was also the head football coach at Snow College, a junior college in Ephraim, Utah, from 1981 to 1982, tallying a mark of 17–6–1. He played college football at the University of North Carolina at Chapel Hill from 1965 to 1969 as a wide receiver, running back, and kick returner.

== Coaching career ==
From 1971 to 1974, Kelly was an assistant football coach at the University of Richmond, where he received his Juris Doctor degree. He was the head football coach at Pleasant Grove High School in Pleasant Grove, Utah from 1976 to 1978, leading his teams to a record of 17–12 in three seasons. Kelly was an assistant football coach at Snow College under Dave Arslanian in 1979 and 1980. He was also the school's track coach in the spring of 1980. Following the 1980 football season, he succeeded Arslanian as head football coach.

Kelly was the head football at Eastern New Mexico University in Portales, New Mexico from 1983 to 1984, comping a record of 13–7–1.

In 1985, Kelly become the head football coach at West Texas State University—now known as West Texas A&M University—in Canyon, Texas. The West Texas A&M Buffaloes competed at the NCAA Division I-A as a member of the Missouri Valley Conference (MVC) in 1985, but dropped to NCAA Division II competition in 1986 and joined Lone Star Conference (LSC), winning the conference title. Kelly won conference coach of the year honors in 1985 and 1986.

== Later life and death ==
Kelly practiced as a family and criminal defense attorney in Canyon, Texas. He died from pneumonia, on May 13, 2023, at the age of 75.

== Head coaching record ==
=== College football ===
| Year | Team | Overall | Conference | Standing | Bowl/playoffs | NAIA^{#} |
|---|---|---|---|---|---|---|
Eastern New Mexico Greyhounds (NAIA Division I independent) (1983–1984)
| 1983 | Eastern New Mexico | 8–2–1 | | | L NAIA Division I Quarterfinal | 6 |
| 1984 | Eastern New Mexico | 5–5 | | | | |
| Eastern New Mexico: | | 13–7–1 | | | | |
West Texas State Buffaloes (Missouri Valley Conference) (1985)
| 1985 | West Texas State | 6–3–1 | 3–1–1 | T–2nd | | |
West Texas State Buffaloes (Lone Star Conference) (1986–1987)
| 1986 | West Texas State | 7–4 | 6–0 | 1st | | |
| 1987 | West Texas State | 5–6 | 2–3 | T–4th | | |
| West Texas State: | | 18–13–1 | 11–4–1 | | | |
| Total: | | 31–20–2 | | | | |
National championship Conference title Conference division title or championship game berth
^{#}Rankings from final NAIA Division I poll.

=== Junior college football ===
| Year | Team | Overall | Conference | Standing | Bowl/playoffs |
|---|---|---|---|---|---|
Snow Badgers (Intermountain Collegiate Athletic Conference) (1981–1982)
| 1981 | Snow | 9–2–1 | 4–2 | 2nd | W Wool Bowl |
| 1982 | Snow | 8–4 | 4–2 | T–1st | W Valley of the Sun Bowl |
| Snow: | | 17–6–1 | 8–4 | | |
| Total: | | 17–6–1 | | | |
National championship Conference title Conference division title or championship game berth
