= Jack Perrin (American football) =

American college football player and coach, track and field athlete and coach

Biographical details
- Born: c. 1935

Playing career

Football
- 1955–1958: Northeast Missouri State

Track and field
- c. 1955–1959: Northeast Missouri State
- Positions: Halfback, fullback, wingback, linebacker, cornerback, safety (football); Pole vault (track and field)

Coaching career (HC unless noted)

Football
- 1959: Northeast Missouri State (assistant)
- 1960–1963: Mehlville HS (MO) (backfield)
- 1964–1965: Boise (backfield)
- 1966–1979: Mesa (CO)

Track and field
- 1959–1960: Northeast Missouri State
- 1966–?: Mesa (CO)

Head coaching record
- Overall: 17–28–2 (college football); 44–35–6 (junior college football)

Accomplishments and honors

Championships
- Football; 4 ICAC (1967–1970)

Awards
- Football; First-team all-MIAA (1956)

Jack Perrin (born c. 1935) is an American former college football player and coach and track and field athlete and coach. He served as the head football coach at and Mesa College—now known as Colorado Mesa University—in Grand Junction, Colorado from 1966 to 1979.

Perrin attended Wood River High School in Wood River, Illinois, where he lettered in football, baseball, and track and field. in 1953, he was named Illinois Prep Player of the Year. He then went to Northeast Missouri State Teachers College—now known as Truman State University—where he lettered four years on the football team, and earned first-team all-Missouri Intercollegiate Athletic Association (MIAA) honors as a fullback during his sophomore year, in 1956. Perrin also lettered for three years on the track team as a pole vaulter.

Perrin began his coaching career at his alma mater, Northeast Missouri State, in 1959–60, serving as assistant football coach, track and field coach, and gymnastics instructor. He then spent for years, from 1960 to 1964, as the supervisor of physical education for the elementary schools of the Mehlville School District in St. Louis County, Missouri. During this time he was also the backfield coach for the varsity football team at Mehlville High School in Mehlville, Missouri. From 1964 to 1965, Perrin was the backfield coach for the football team at Boise College—now known as Boise State University—under head football coach Lyle Smith. He succeeded Bus Bergman as Mesa's head football coach in 1966.

During Perrin's first 10 years as Mesa's head coach, the Mavericks competed at the junior college level, as members of the Intermountain Collegiate Athletic Conference (ICAC), aside from 1971. His teams won three outright ICAC titles, in 1967, 1969, and 1970. Mesa shared the conference title in 1968. In 1975, Mesa moved up to the four-year college level and joined the Rocky Mountain Athletic Conference (RMAC).

== Head coaching record ==
=== College ===
Year	Team	Overall	Conference	Standing	Bowl/playoffs	NAIA^{#}
Mesa Mavericks (Rocky Mountain Athletic Conference) (1975–1979)
1975	Mesa	0–8	0–7	8th		
1976	Mesa	4–5–1	3–5	T–6th		
1977	Mesa	8–1–1	7–1–1	2nd		14
1978	Mesa	4–6	4–4	T–5th		
1979	Mesa	1–8	1–7	9th		
Mesa:		17–28–2	15–24–1			
Total:		17–28–2				
^{#}Rankings from final NAIA Division I poll.

=== Junior college football ===
Year	Team	Overall	Conference	Standing	Bowl/playoffs
Mesa Mavericks (Intermountain Collegiate Athletic Conference) (1966–1970)
1966	Mesa	5–4	2–2	3rd	
1967	Mesa	8–1–1	4–0	1st	
1968	Mesa	8–2	2–1	T–1st	
1969	Mesa	6–2–2	3–0	1st	
1970	Mesa	4–6	3–0	1st	
Mesa Mavericks (NJCAA independent) (1971)
1971	Mesa	5–4			
Mesa Mavericks (Intermountain Collegiate Athletic Conference) (1972–1974)
1972	Mesa	4–3–2	1–1–1	T–2nd	
1973	Mesa	3–6	2–1	2nd	
1974	Mesa	1–7–1	0–3	4th	
Mesa:		44–35–6	19–8–1		
Total:					
National championship Conference title Conference division title or championship game berth
