= Rick Baird =

American football player (born 1974)

Rick Baird (born January 14, 1974) was a member of the U.S. Bobsled team from 1998 to 2003. He began his career with the United States Bobsled and Skeleton Federation in 1998. He was a forerunner for the U.S. Bobsled team during the 2002 Winter Olympics in Salt Lake City. He also had the honor of running with the olympic torch for the 2002 Olympic Games.

Rick played football at Dixie State College of Utah and Utah State University. He was also a standout track athlete for Utah State University being named All-Big West Conference in the hammer throw in 1998.

Rick worked as the throwing coach for the UNLV Track and Field team from 2002-2005. He also worked as a NSCA certified personal trainer for 24 Hour Fitness.

In the winter of 2009 Rick became the Head Track and Field coach at Faith Lutheran High School and guided his team to State Championship titles for both boys and girls teams in his first year as head coach. In his 2nd year as head coach he received the award as Sunset Conference girls Coach of the Year.

In the summer of 2009 Rick started his own personal training company; Peak Performance Fitness.

== Official links ==
- Rick Baird's USBSF Official Webpage
- Rick Baird's UNLV Coaching Profile
- Rick Baird's official personal training website
