= Dave Arslanian =

American football player and coach (born 1949)

Biographical details
- Born: April 13, 1949 (age 77); St. George, Utah, U.S.
- Education: Arizona State University

Playing career
- 1967–1968: Dixie (UT)
- 1969–1971: Weber State
- Position: Defensive back

Coaching career (HC unless noted)
- 1972: Arizona State (GA)
- 1973–1974: Scottsdale (DB)
- 1975–1980: Snow
- 1981–1988: Weber State (DB)
- 1989–1997: Weber State
- 1998–1999: Utah State
- 2001: Birmingham Thunderbolts (OC/QB)

Head coaching record
- Overall: 60–62 (college)
- Tournaments: 0–1 (NCAA D-I-AA playoffs)

Accomplishments and honors

Championships
- 3 ICAC (1976–1978)

Dave Arslanian (born April 13, 1949) is an American former college football coach and player. He served as the head football coach at Weber State University from 1989 to 1997 and Utah State University from 1998 to 1999, compiling a career college football coaching record of 60–62.

== Coaching career ==
After graduating in 1971, he went to Arizona State University as a graduate assistant under Frank Kush, coaching the freshmen defensive backs. He then spent two seasons at Scottsdale Community College on the school's first ever football staff, coaching defensive backs.

Arslanian began his head coaching career at Snow College, a junior college in Ephraim, Utah, before moving on to Weber State.

Arslanian spent 16 years on the coaching staff at Weber State. He was an assistant for seven years under Mike Price and spent nine seasons (1989–1997) as the head coach for the Wildcats. During his tenure, Arslanian compiled a 53–47 record. His 53 victories are the most in Weber State history, just ahead of his father, Sark Arslanian, who compiled a 50–26–2 record from 1965 to 1972. The younger Arslanian coached the Wildcats to six winning records and one appearance in the NCAA Division I-AA playoffs in his last seven seasons as head coach.

Following the 1997 season, Arslanian moved north to take over as head coach at Utah State University. He coached the Utah State Aggies for two seasons, posting a 7–15 record before being fired on December 2, 1999 with two years remaining on his original four-year contract.

Arslanian resurfaced briefly as the offensive coordinator and quarterbacks coach for the Birmingham Thunderbolts, a team in the ill-fated XFL in 2001.

Arslanian is now out of coaching and currently runs Eagle Ranch Academy in St. George Utah.

== Personal life ==
Arslanian was born in St. George, Utah. He was one of six children. He attended college at Weber State, where he earned a bachelor's degree in Education with an emphasis in health, physical education, and recreation/psychology; and Arizona State; where he earned a master's degree in health, physical education, and recreation. He is the son of Sark Arslanian, who served as the head football coach at Weber State College from 1965 to 1972 and at Colorado State University from 1973 to 1981.

== Head coaching record ==
=== College ===
Year	Team	Overall	Conference	Standing	Bowl/playoffs	NCAA^{#}
Weber State Wildcats (Big Sky Conference) (1989–1987)
1989	Weber State	3–8	1–7	9th		
1990	Weber State	5–6	3–5	5th		
1991	Weber State	8–4	6–2	5th	L NCAA Division I-AA First Round	15
1992	Weber State	6–5	4–3	T–3rd		
1993	Weber State	7–4	3–4	T–5th		
1994	Weber State	5–6	2–5	T–6th		
1995	Weber State	6–5	4–3	T–2nd		
1996	Weber State	7–4	4–3	T–3rd		
1997	Weber State	6–5	4–4	T–4th		
Weber State:		53–47	31–36			
Utah State Aggies (Big West Conference) (1998–1999)
1998	Utah State	3–8	2–3	T–4th		
1999	Utah State	4–7	3–3	4th		
Utah State:		7–15	5–6			
Total:		60–62				

=== Junior college ===
Year	Team	Overall	Conference	Standing	Bowl/playoffs
Snow Badgers (Intermountain Collegiate Athletic Conference) (1975–1980)
1975	Snow				
1976	Snow	9–2	2–1	T–1st	
1977	Snow	7–2–1	3–2	1st	
1978	Snow	6–4	4–1	1st	
1979	Snow	4–4–2	3–2–1	2nd	
1980	Snow	5–5	4–2	2nd	
Snow:					
Total:					
National championship Conference title Conference division title or championship game berth
