= Western States Football League =

Former American junior college football league

The Western States Football League (WSFL) is a defunct American junior college football league for schools in the states of Arizona, Idaho, New Mexico and Utah that existed from 1985 to 2018. The league was part of the National Junior College Athletic Association (NJCAA).

== History ==
Formed in 1985, the WSFL initially consisted of ten schools, six from the Arizona Community College Athletic Conference (ACCAC) and four from the Intermountain Collegiate Athletic Conference (ICAC). The founding members were:

- Mesa Community College (Mesa, Arizona)
- Phoenix College (Phoenix, Arizona)
- Scottsdale Community College (Scottsdale, Arizona)
- Glendale Community College (Glendale, Arizona)
- Arizona Western College (Yuma, Arizona)
- Eastern Arizona College (Thatcher, Arizona)
- Dixie State College (St. George, Utah)
- Snow College (Ephraim, Utah)
- College of Eastern Utah (Price, Utah)
- Ricks College (Rexburg, Idaho)

Over the years, a number of schools entered and left the league. In 1988, Eastern Utah cancelled its football program and left the league. Its place was taken in 1993 by New Mexico Military Institute. Eastern Arizona left the WSFL in 1994, but rejoined the following year. New Mexico Military left the league in 1996, but rejoined in 2001. Pima Community College joined the WSFL in 2001. In 2002, Ricks College cancelled all sports and left the WSFL, after changing its name to Brigham Young University–Idaho. In 2006, Dixie State left the league when the school moved to the NCAA Division II level. New Mexico Military left the WSFL for the Southwest Junior College Football Conference (SJCFC) following the 2015 season.

All of the schools in Arizona canceled football following the 2018 season, leaving only Snow College, which is now an NJCAA independent.

== Former members ==
Institution	Location	Founded	Nickname	Colors	Joined	Left
Arizona Western College	Yuma, Arizona	1963	Matadors		1985	2018
Dixie State College of Utah	St. George, Utah	1911	Trailblazers		1985	2006
Eastern Arizona College	Thatcher, Arizona	1888	Gila Monsters		1985, 1995	1994, 2018
College of Eastern Utah	Price, Utah	1937	Eagles		1985	1988
Glendale Community College	Glendale, Arizona	1965	Gauchos		1985	2018
Mesa Community College	Mesa, Arizona	1965	Thunderbirds		1985	2018
New Mexico Military Institute	Roswell, New Mexico	1891	Broncos		1993, 2001	1996, 2015
Phoenix College	Phoenix, Arizona	1920	Bears		1985	2018
Pima Community College	Tucson, Arizona	1969	Aztecs		2001	2018
Ricks College	Rexburg, Idaho	1888	Vikings		1985	2002
Scottsdale Community College	Scottsdale, Arizona	1969	Fighting Artichokes		1985	2018
Snow College	Ephraim, Utah	1888	Badgers		1985	2018

== National championships ==
- Phoenix College won the NJCAA National Football Championship in 1964.
- Arizona Western College won the NJCAA National Football Championship in 1972.
- Mesa Community College won the NJCAA National Football Championship in 1973 and 1975.
- Snow College won the NJCAA National Football Championship in 1985.
- Glendale Community College won the NJCAA National Football Championship in 1988, 2000 and 2005.

== Yearly standings ==
1985 Western States Football League standings
	Conf.					Overall
Team	W		L		T	W		L		T
Snow $	9	–	0	–	0	11	–	0	–	0
Phoenix	8	–	1	–	0	8	–	1	–	0
Ricks	6	–	3	–	0	7	–	3	–	0
Dixie (UT)	5	–	4	–	0	7	–	4	–	0
Scottsdale	5	–	4	–	0	5	–	4	–	0
Arizona Western	5	–	4	–	0	5	–	4	–	0
Eastern Utah	3	–	6	–	0	3	–	6	–	0
Glendale (AZ)	3	–	6	–	0	3	–	6	–	0
Mesa (AZ)	1	–	8	–	0	1	–	8	–	0
Eastern Arizona	0	–	9	–	0	0	–	9	–	0
$ – Conference champion

1986 Western States Football League standings
	Conf.					Overall
Team	W		L		T	W		L		T
Ricks $	8	–	0	–	1	10	–	0	–	1
Dixie (UT)	8	–	1	–	0	11	–	1	–	0
Phoenix	7	–	2	–	0	8	–	2	–	0
Snow	6	–	3	–	0	6	–	4	–	0
Arizona Western	5	–	4	–	0	5	–	4	–	0
Scottsdale	4	–	5	–	0	4	–	5	–	0
Mesa (AZ)	3	–	6	–	0	3	–	6	–	0
Eastern Utah	2	–	6	–	1	3	–	6	–	1
Glendale (AZ)	1	–	8	–	0	1	–	8	–	0
Eastern Arizona	0	–	9	–	0	0	–	9	–	0
$ – Conference champion

1987 Western States Football League standings
	Conf.					Overall
Team	W		L		T	W		L		T
Dixie (UT) $	8	–	1	–	0	11	–	1	–	0
Snow	7	–	2	–	0	7	–	3	–	0
Mesa (AZ)	6	–	2	–	1	7	–	3	–	1
Phoenix	6	–	2	–	1	6	–	3	–	1
Ricks	5	–	4	–	0	7	–	4	–	0
Arizona Western	4	–	4	–	1	4	–	4	–	1
Glendale (AZ)	3	–	6	–	0	3	–	6	–	0
Eastern Utah	2	–	7	–	0	2	–	7	–	0
Scottsdale	1	–	7	–	1	1	–	7	–	1
Eastern Arizona	1	–	8	–	0	1	–	8	–	0
$ – Conference champion

1988 Western States Football League standings
	Conf.					Overall
Team	W		L		T	W		L		T
Glendale (AZ) $	8	–	0	–	0	10	–	0	–	0
Ricks	6	–	2	–	0	9	–	2	–	0
Dixie (UT)	5	–	3	–	0	8	–	3	–	0
Mesa (AZ)	5	–	3	–	0	6	–	3	–	0
Snow	3	–	5	–	0	4	–	6	–	0
Phoenix	3	–	5	–	0	3	–	6	–	0
Arizona Western	3	–	5	–	0	3	–	7	–	0
Scottsdale	2	–	6	–	0	3	–	6	–	0
Eastern Arizona	0	–	8	–	0	0	–	9	–	0
$ – Conference champion

1989 Western States Football League standings
	Conf.					Overall
Team	W		L		T	W		L		T
Mesa (AZ) $	7	–	0	–	1	9	–	0	–	1
Dixie (UT)	7	–	1	–	0	10	–	1	–	0
Ricks	6	–	1	–	1	8	–	2	–	1
Snow	4	–	3	–	1	6	–	3	–	2
Glendale (AZ)	4	–	3	–	1	4	–	3	–	1
Arizona Western	3	–	5	–	0	3	–	7	–	0
Phoenix	1	–	7	–	0	1	–	7	–	1
Eastern Arizona	1	–	7	–	0	1	–	7	–	0
Scottsdale	1	–	7	–	0	1	–	8	–	0
$ – Conference champion

1990 Western States Football League standings
	Conf.					Overall
Team	W		L		T	W		L		T
Dixie (UT) +	6	–	2	–	0	9	–	2	–	0
Glendale (AZ) +	6	–	2	–	0	7	–	3	–	0
Ricks +	6	–	2	–	0	7	–	4	–	0
Snow	4	–	4	–	0	5	–	5	–	0
Mesa (AZ)	5	–	3	–	0	5	–	3	–	0
Eastern Arizona	3	–	5	–	0	4	–	5	–	0
Scottsdale	3	–	5	–	0	4	–	5	–	0
Phoenix	2	–	6	–	0	2	–	7	–	0
Arizona Western	1	–	7	–	0	1	–	8	–	0
+ – Conference co-champions

1991 Western States Football League standings
	Conf.					Overall
Team	W		L		T	W		L		T
Glendale (AZ) $	7	–	1	–	0	8	–	2	–	0
Ricks	6	–	2	–	0	9	–	2	–	0
Snow	6	–	2	–	0	8	–	2	–	0
Mesa (AZ)	6	–	2	–	0	7	–	2	–	0
Dixie (UT)	4	–	4	–	0	6	–	5	–	0
Phoenix	3	–	5	–	0	3	–	6	–	0
Scottsdale	2	–	6	–	0	3	–	6	–	0
Arizona Western	2	–	6	–	0	2	–	6	–	0
Eastern Arizona	0	–	8	–	0	1	–	9	–	0
$ – Conference champion

1992 Western States Football League standings
	Conf.					Overall
Team	W		L		T	W		L		T
Ricks $	8	–	0	–	0	11	–	0	–	0
Snow	7	–	1	–	0	8	–	2	–	0
Glendale (AZ)	5	–	3	–	0	7	–	3	–	0
Mesa (AZ)	5	–	3	–	0	6	–	3	–	0
Dixie (UT)	4	–	4	–	0	5	–	5	–	0
Eastern Arizona	2	–	6	–	0	3	–	7	–	0
Arizona Western	2	–	6	–	0	2	–	7	–	0
Phoenix	2	–	6	–	0	2	–	7	–	0
Scottsdale	1	–	7	–	0	1	–	8	–	0
$ – Conference champion

1993 Western States Football League standings
	Conf.					Overall
Team	W		L		T	W		L		T
Ricks $	9	–	0	–	0	10	–	1	–	0
Glendale (AZ)	7	–	2	–	0	8	–	2	–	0
Snow	6	–	3	–	0	7	–	3	–	0
Mesa (AZ)	6	–	3	–	0	6	–	3	–	0
Scottsdale	5	–	4	–	0	5	–	4	–	0
Phoenix	4	–	5	–	0	4	–	5	–	0
Arizona Western	3	–	6	–	0	3	–	6	–	0
New Mexico Military	2	–	7	–	0	3	–	7	–	0
Dixie (UT) *	2	–	7	–	0	3	–	8	–	0
Eastern Arizona	1	–	8	–	0	1	–	8	–	0
$ – Conference champion; * – Dixie forfeited five conference wins—over Ricks, Snow, Mesa, Scottsdale, and Eastern Arizona—because of ineligible player.

1994 Western States Football League standings
	Conf.					Overall
Team	W		L		T	W		L		T
Ricks $	8	–	0	–	0	11	–	0	–	0
Dixie (UT)	5	–	2	–	1	8	–	2	–	1
Snow	5	–	2	–	1	6	–	2	–	1
Mesa (AZ)	4	–	4	–	0	6	–	4	–	0
Glendale (AZ)	3	–	4	–	1	4	–	4	–	1
Scottsdale	3	–	4	–	1	3	–	5	–	1
Arizona Western	3	–	5	–	0	3	–	7	–	0
New Mexico Military	2	–	6	–	0	3	–	7	–	0
Phoenix	1	–	7	–	0	1	–	8	–	0
$ – Conference champion

1995 Western States Football League standings
	Conf.					Overall
Team	W		L		T	W		L		T
Dixie (UT) $	8	–	1	–	0	10	–	1	–	0
Snow	7	–	2	–	0	9	–	2	–	0
Ricks	7	–	2	–	0	8	–	4	–	0
Glendale (AZ)	6	–	3	–	0	7	–	4	–	0
Mesa (AZ)	5	–	4	–	0	6	–	4	–	0
Scottsdale	5	–	4	–	0	5	–	5	–	0
Arizona Western	3	–	6	–	0	3	–	7	–	0
Eastern Arizona	2	–	7	–	0	2	–	7	–	0
Phoenix	2	–	7	–	0	2	–	8	–	0
New Mexico Military	0	–	9	–	0	1	–	10	–	0
$ – Conference champion

1996 Western States Football League standings
	Conf.					Overall
Team	W		L		T	W		L		T
Dixie (UT) +	7	–	1	–	0	10	–	1	–	0
Snow +	7	–	1	–	0	9	–	1	–	0
Glendale (AZ)	5	–	3	–	0	8	–	3	–	0
Ricks	5	–	3	–	0	6	–	4	–	0
Arizona Western	4	–	4	–	0	5	–	5	–	0
Eastern Arizona	3	–	5	–	0	4	–	6	–	0
Mesa (AZ)	2	–	6	–	0	4	–	6	–	0
Scottsdale	2	–	6	–	0	2	–	7	–	0
Phoenix	1	–	7	–	0	1	–	8	–	0
+ – Conference co-champions

1997 Western States Football League standings
	Conf.					Overall
Team	W		L		T	W		L		T
Ricks $	8	–	0	–	0	11	–	1	–	0
Dixie (UT)	7	–	1	–	0	11	–	1	–	0
Snow	6	–	2	–	0	8	–	3	–	0
Eastern Arizona	5	–	3	–	0	6	–	4	–	0
Glendale (AZ)	4	–	4	–	0	7	–	4	–	0
Mesa (AZ)	3	–	5	–	0	5	–	5	–	0
Scottsdale	1	–	7	–	0	2	–	8	–	0
Arizona Western	1	–	7	–	0	2	–	8	–	0
Phoenix	1	–	7	–	0	1	–	8	–	0
$ – Conference champion

1998 Western States Football League standings
	Conf.					Overall
Team	W		L		T	W		L		T
Ricks $	8	–	0	–	0	10	–	1	–	0
Snow	6	–	2	–	0	8	–	2	–	0
Arizona Western	5	–	3	–	0	7	–	4	–	0
Dixie (UT)	5	–	3	–	0	7	–	5	–	0
Mesa (AZ)	5	–	3	–	0	7	–	5	–	0
Glendale (AZ)	3	–	5	–	0	5	–	5	–	0
Scottsdale	2	–	6	–	0	2	–	8	–	0
Eastern Arizona	1	–	7	–	0	3	–	7	–	0
Phoenix	1	–	7	–	0	1	–	9	–	0
$ – Conference champion

1999 Western States Football League standings
	Conf.					Overall
Team	W		L		T	W		L		T
Dixie (UT) $	8	–	0	–	0	11	–	1	–	0
Ricks	7	–	1	–	0	10	–	1	–	0
Snow	5	–	3	–	0	7	–	3	–	0
Arizona Western	5	–	3	–	0	6	–	4	–	0
Glendale (AZ)	3	–	4	–	0	5	–	6	–	0
Mesa (AZ)	2	–	6	–	0	3	–	7	–	0
Eastern Arizona	2	–	5	–	0	2	–	6	–	0
Phoenix	2	–	6	–	0	3	–	7	–	0
Scottsdale	1	–	7	–	0	2	–	8	–	0
$ – Conference champion; The conference game between Glendale and Eastern Arizona was ruled a no-content after the game was ended at halftime following a brawl between the two teams.

2000 Western States Football League standings
	Conf.					Overall
Team	W		L		T	W		L		T
Glendale (AZ) $	7	–	1	–	0	10	–	1	–	0
Arizona Western	6	–	2	–	0	7	–	2	–	0
Snow	6	–	2	–	0	7	–	3	–	0
Dixie State	5	–	3	–	0	8	–	3	–	0
Ricks	5	–	3	–	0	8	–	3	–	0
Scottsdale	3	–	5	–	0	5	–	5	–	0
Eastern Arizona	2	–	6	–	0	3	–	7	–	0
Phoenix	2	–	6	–	0	3	–	7	–	0
Mesa (AZ)	0	–	8	–	0	1	–	9	–	0
$ – Conference champion

2001 Western States Football League standings
	Conf.					Overall
Team	W		L		T	W		L		T
Dixie State +	9	–	1	–	0	11	–	1	–	0
Ricks +	9	–	1	–	0	10	–	1	–	0
Snow	6	–	4	–	0	6	–	4	–	0
Scottsdale	6	–	4	–	0	6	–	5	–	0
Mesa (AZ)	5	–	5	–	0	5	–	5	–	0
Glendale (AZ)	5	–	5	–	0	5	–	5	–	0
Arizona Western	4	–	6	–	0	4	–	6	–	0
Pima	4	–	6	–	0	4	–	6	–	0
Eastern Arizona	3	–	7	–	0	3	–	7	–	0
New Mexico Military	3	–	7	–	0	3	–	7	–	0
Phoenix	1	–	9	–	0	1	–	9	–	0
+ – Conference co-champions

2002 Western States Football League standings
	Conf.			Overall
Team	W		L	W		L
Dixie State $	9	–	0	10	–	2
Glendale (AZ)	7	–	2	9	–	2
Snow	7	–	2	8	–	2
Pima	6	–	3	7	–	3
Arizona Western	5	–	4	6	–	4
New Mexico Military	5	–	4	5	–	6
Scottsdale	3	–	6	3	–	6
Mesa (AZ)	2	–	7	2	–	7
Phoenix	1	–	8	2	–	8
Eastern Arizona	0	–	9	0	–	10
$ – Conference champion

2003 Western States Football League standings
	Conf.			Overall
Team	W		L	W		L
Snow +	8	–	1	10	–	1
Dixie State +	8	–	1	10	–	2
Glendale (AZ)	7	–	2	9	–	2
Arizona Western	5	–	4	7	–	4
Pima	4	–	5	6	–	5
New Mexico Military	3	–	6	5	–	6
Eastern Arizona	3	–	6	3	–	7
Mesa (AZ)	3	–	6	3	–	7
Phoenix	2	–	7	3	–	7
Scottsdale	2	–	7	3	–	7
+ – Conference co-champions

2004 Western States Football League standings
	Conf.			Overall
Team	W		L	W		L
Scottsdale $	8	–	1	9	–	2
Dixie State	7	–	2	10	–	2
Pima	6	–	3	9	–	3
Glendale (AZ)	6	–	3	6	–	4
Snow	5	–	4	7	–	4
Mesa (AZ)	5	–	4	6	–	4
Arizona Western	5	–	4	5	–	4
New Mexico Military	1	–	8	2	–	9
Eastern Arizona	1	–	8	1	–	8
Phoenix	1	–	8	1	–	8
$ – Conference champion

2005 Western States Football League standings
	Conf.			Overall
Team	W		L	W		L
Glendale (AZ) $	9	–	0	11	–	0
Snow	7	–	2	10	–	2
Dixie State	6	–	3	9	–	3
Mesa (AZ)	6	–	3	7	–	3
Eastern Arizona	5	–	4	6	–	4
New Mexico Military	4	–	5	6	–	5
Scottsdale	4	–	5	5	–	5
Arizona Western	3	–	6	4	–	7
Phoenix	1	–	8	1	–	9
Pima	0	–	9	0	–	9
$ – Conference champion

2006 Western States Football League standings
	Conf.			Overall
Team	W		L	W		L
Snow +	7	–	1	11	–	1
Glendale (AZ) +	7	–	1	9	–	2
Scottsdale	6	–	2	6	–	4
Eastern Arizona	5	–	3	7	–	4
New Mexico Military	4	–	4	5	–	5
Arizona Western	3	–	5	5	–	6
Phoenix	3	–	5	4	–	6
Mesa (AZ)	1	–	7	2	–	7
Pima	0	–	8	0	–	10
+ – Conference co-champions

2007 Western States Football League standings
	Conf.			Overall
Team	W		L	W		L
Snow $	8	–	0	11	–	1
Eastern Arizona	6	–	2	9	–	2
Mesa (AZ)	6	–	2	9	–	2
Glendale (AZ)	5	–	3	6	–	4
Phoenix	4	–	4	4	–	6
Scottsdale	3	–	5	5	–	5
New Mexico Military	2	–	6	3	–	8
Arizona Western	2	–	6	2	–	8
Pima	0	–	8	1	–	10
$ – Conference champion

2008 Western States Football League standings
	Conf.			Overall
Team	W		L	W		L
Snow $	8	–	0	11	–	1
Glendale (AZ)	6	–	2	8	–	2
Phoenix	6	–	2	7	–	4
Eastern Arizona	5	–	3	8	–	3
Arizona Western	4	–	4	5	–	5
New Mexico Military	3	–	5	5	–	6
Mesa (AZ)	3	–	5	3	–	7
Scottsdale	1	–	7	3	–	7
Pima	0	–	8	0	–	10
$ – Conference champion

2009 Western States Football League standings
	Conf.			Overall
Team	W		L	W		L
Snow +	7	–	1	10	–	2
Arizona Western +	7	–	1	9	–	2
Eastern Arizona	5	–	3	8	–	3
New Mexico Military	5	–	3	7	–	3
Glendale (AZ)	4	–	4	7	–	5
Phoenix	3	–	5	4	–	6
Scottsdale	3	–	5	4	–	6
Mesa (AZ)	2	–	6	2	–	8
Pima	0	–	8	0	–	10
+ – Conference co-champions

2010 Western States Football League standings
	Conf.			Overall
Team	W		L	W		L
Arizona Western +	7	–	1	10	–	2
Snow +	7	–	1	10	–	2
Eastern Arizona	6	–	2	8	–	4
Glendale (AZ)	5	–	3	8	–	3
Scottsdale	4	–	4	6	–	4
New Mexico Military	3	–	5	3	–	8
Phoenix	2	–	6	2	–	8
Pima	1	–	7	3	–	8
Mesa (AZ)	1	–	7	1	–	9
+ – Conference co-champions

2012 Western States Football League standings
	Conf.			Overall
Team	W		L	W		L
Snow $	8	–	0	10	–	1
Arizona Western	6	–	2	8	–	2
Glendale (AZ)	6	–	2	8	–	3
Mesa (AZ)	5	–	3	6	–	5
New Mexico Military	4	–	4	6	–	5
Scottsdale	3	–	5	5	–	5
Phoenix	3	–	6	3	–	7
Eastern Arizona	2	–	6	4	–	6
Pima	0	–	9	1	–	10
$ – Conference champion

2013 Western States Football League standings
	Conf.			Overall
Team	W		L	W		L
Scottsdale y$^	7	–	1	10	–	1
Mesa (AZ) y^	7	–	1	8	–	3
New Mexico Military ^	5	–	3	8	–	4
Eastern Arizona ^	5	–	3	6	–	5
Pima	5	–	5	5	–	5
Snow	5	–	5	5	–	6
Glendale (AZ)	4	–	7	4	–	7
Arizona Western	2	–	8	2	–	10
Phoenix	1	–	8	1	–	8
WSFL championship: Scottsdale 45, Mesa (AZ) 31
$ – Conference champion; y – Championship game participant; ^ – WSFL playoff participant

2014 Western States Football League standings
	Conf.			Overall
Team	W		L	W		L
Arizona Western y$^	7	–	1	11	–	1
Snow ^	7	–	1	8	–	2
Scottsdale y^	7	–	1	8	–	3
Glendale (AZ) ^	5	–	3	5	–	5
Eastern Arizona	4	–	4	6	–	5
Mesa (AZ)	3	–	5	5	–	5
New Mexico Military	2	–	6	3	–	8
Pima	1	–	7	3	–	8
Phoenix	0	–	8	0	–	9
WSFL championship: Arizona Western 52, Scottsdale 27
$ – Conference champion; y – Championship game participant; ^ – WSFL playoff participant

2015 Western States Football League standings
	Conf.			Overall
Team	W		L	W		L
No. 2 Snow y$^	7	–	1	10	–	1
No. 19 Arizona Western ^	5	–	3	7	–	4
Pima y^	5	–	3	7	–	4
Eastern Arizona	5	–	3	7	–	4
New Mexico Military ^	5	–	3	6	–	5
Scottsdale	4	–	4	7	–	4
Glendale (AZ)	3	–	5	3	–	7
Mesa (AZ)	2	–	6	3	–	7
Phoenix	0	–	8	0	–	8
WSFL championship: Snow 26, Pima 16
$ – Conference champion; y – Championship game participant; ^ – WSFL playoff participant; Rankings from NJCAA polls

2016 Western States Football League standings
	Conf.			Overall
Team	W		L	W		L
No. 3 Arizona Western $	8	–	0	11	–	1
No. 5 Mesa (AZ)	6	–	1	9	–	2
No. 13 Eastern Arizona	4	–	2	9	–	3
No. 18 Snow	4	–	3	7	–	3
Phoenix	2	–	5	5	–	6
Pima	2	–	6	3	–	6
Glendale (AZ)	1	–	5	4	–	6
Scottsdale	1	–	6	1	–	9
$ – Conference champion; Rankings from NJCAA poll

2017 Western States Football League standings
	Conf.			Overall
Team	W		L	W		L
No. 3 Arizona Western $^	7	–	0	9	–	1
No. 4 Snow	6	–	1	10	–	1
No. 20 Eastern Arizona	4	–	3	8	–	4
Mesa (AZ)	4	–	3	6	–	5
Scottsdale	3	–	4	6	–	4
Phoenix	2	–	5	3	–	7
Glendale (AZ)	2	–	5	2	–	8
Pima	0	–	7	2	–	9
$ – Conference champion; ^ – NJCAA National Championship participant; Rankings from NJCAA poll

2018 Western States Football League standings
	Conf.			Overall
Team	W		L	W		L
No. 10 Eastern Arizona $	6	–	1	9	–	3
No. 9 Snow	5	–	2	8	–	3
Pima	4	–	2	6	–	4
No. 19 Scottsdale	4	–	3	7	–	4
Arizona Western	4	–	3	6	–	5
Mesa (AZ)	2	–	4	4	–	5
Glendale (AZ)	2	–	5	3	–	8
Phoenix	0	–	7	1	–	10
$ – Conference champion; Rankings from NJCAA poll
