= Dixie Rotary Bowl =

Former annual US college football bowl game

Dixie Rotary Bowl (defunct)
- Stadium: Greater Zion Stadium
- Location: St. George, Utah, U.S.
- Operated: 1986–2008
- Conference tie-ins: NJCAA (1986–2005); NCAA D-II (2006–2008)

Sponsors
- Rotary Club of St. George, Utah

The Dixie Rotary Bowl was a college football bowl game initiated by the Rotary Club of St. George, Utah, and first played in 1986 at Greater Zion Stadium, the home field of Utah Tech University's predecessor institution, Dixie State Junior College. From 1986 to 2005, the game was a junior college bowl sanctioned by the National Junior College Athletic Association, featuring top NJCAA teams. The bowl was an NCAA Division II game from 2006 through 2008 after Dixie State became a four-year college and transitioned to Division II. The game was canceled before the beginning of the 2009 season, after the home team had failed to appear in consecutive seasons, reducing local interest.

== History ==
Shortly after its creation, the Dixie Rotary Bowl became recognized as one of the top junior college bowl games in the nation. Beginning in 1991, the game was broadcast on the Armed Forces Radio Network. The 1996 game was televised live to 33 states by Prime Sports Network, the first live broadcast of a junior college bowl game. Dixie State played in 19 of the 20 junior college games (all but the 1992 bowl), posting a 15–4 record. In 1999 and again in 2003, the bowl played host to the NJCAA national championship; ironically, these were two of the four times that Dixie State lost the game.

The Dixie Rotary Bowl became an NCAA Division II game in 2006. The NCAA gave Dixie State special permission to participate in the bowl while serving as a provisional Division II member during the 2006 and 2007 seasons. In 2006, Dixie State received an automatic bid, facing the highest-ranked team in the Rocky Mountain Athletic Conference (RMAC) not invited to the NCAA Division II football playoffs. In 2007, the bowl signed a participation agreement with the RMAC and the Great Northwest Athletic Conference (GNAC), providing for each conference to send its highest-ranked team that did not receive a bid to the Division II playoffs. The final two Dixie Rotary Bowls were played under those terms.

== NJCAA National Championships ==
The Dixie Rotary Bowl twice played host to the NJCAA National Football Championship. The first contest was an unsanctioned de facto championship between No. 1 Dixie and No. 3 Butler County in 1999. Butler County pulled off an upset, defeating Dixie, 49–35.

In 2003, the Dixie Rotary Bowl organizing committee received official sanction for the game to be the NJCAA National Football Championship. No. 1 Butler County and No. 2 Dixie again met for the title, with Butler County winning, 14–10.

== Game results ==
=== NJCAA bowls ===
| Date | Winner | | Loser | | References |
|---|---|---|---|---|---|
| 1986 | Dixie (UT) | 36 | Butler County | 33 | |
| December 5, 1987 | Dixie (UT) | 40 | Independence | 37 | |
| 1988 | Dixie (UT) | 56 | Inver Hills | 8 | |
| 1989 | Dixie (UT) | 42 | Northeastern Oklahoma A&M | 21 | |
| 1990 | Dixie (UT) | 34 | Nassau | 0 | |
| December 7, 1991 | Navarro | 27 | Dixie (UT) | 22 | |
| 1992 | Grand Rapids | 42 | Snow | 35 | |
| December 4, 1993 | Coffeyville | 60 | Dixie (UT) | 36 | |
| December 3, 1994 | Dixie (UT) | 26 | Garden City | 21 | |
| 1995 | Dixie (UT) | 42 | Nassau | 6 | |
| 1996 | Dixie (UT) | 34 | Grand Rapids | 16 | |
| 1997 | Dixie (UT) | 76 | Lackawanna | 21 | |
| 1998 | Dixie (UT) | 40 | Snow | 20 | |
| December 4, 1999 | Butler County | 49 | Dixie (UT) | 35 | |
| December 2, 2000 | Dixie State | 17 | Harper | 15 | |
| December 1, 2001 | Dixie State | 40 | Rochester CTC | 14 | |
| December 7, 2002 | Dixie State | 31 | Butler County | 18 | |
| December 6, 2003 | Butler County | 14 | Dixie State | 10 | |
| December 4, 2004 | Dixie State | 27 | Grand Rapids | 20 | |
| December 3, 2005 | Dixie State | 35 | Garden City | 31 | |

=== NCAA Division II bowls ===
| Year played | Winning team | | Losing team | |
|---|---|---|---|---|
| December 2, 2006 | Fort Lewis | 24 | Dixie State | 14 |
| December 1, 2007 | Western Oregon | 26 | Colorado Mines | 12 |
| December 6, 2008 | Western Washington | 25 | Colorado Mines | 10 |
