= Utah State University Eastern =

Regional college in the Utah State University system in Price and Blanding, Utah

Coordinates: 39°36′28″N 110°48′07″W

- Former names: Carbon College; (1937–1959); College of Eastern Utah; (1959–2010)
- Type: Public
- Established: February 20, 1937; 89 years ago
- Affiliations: NJCAA; Scenic West Athletic Conference
- Students: 1,525
- Location: Price, Utah, United States
- Colors: Aggie Blue and White
- Nickname: Eagles
- Mascot: Emmett the Eagle
- Website: https://eastern.usu.edu/

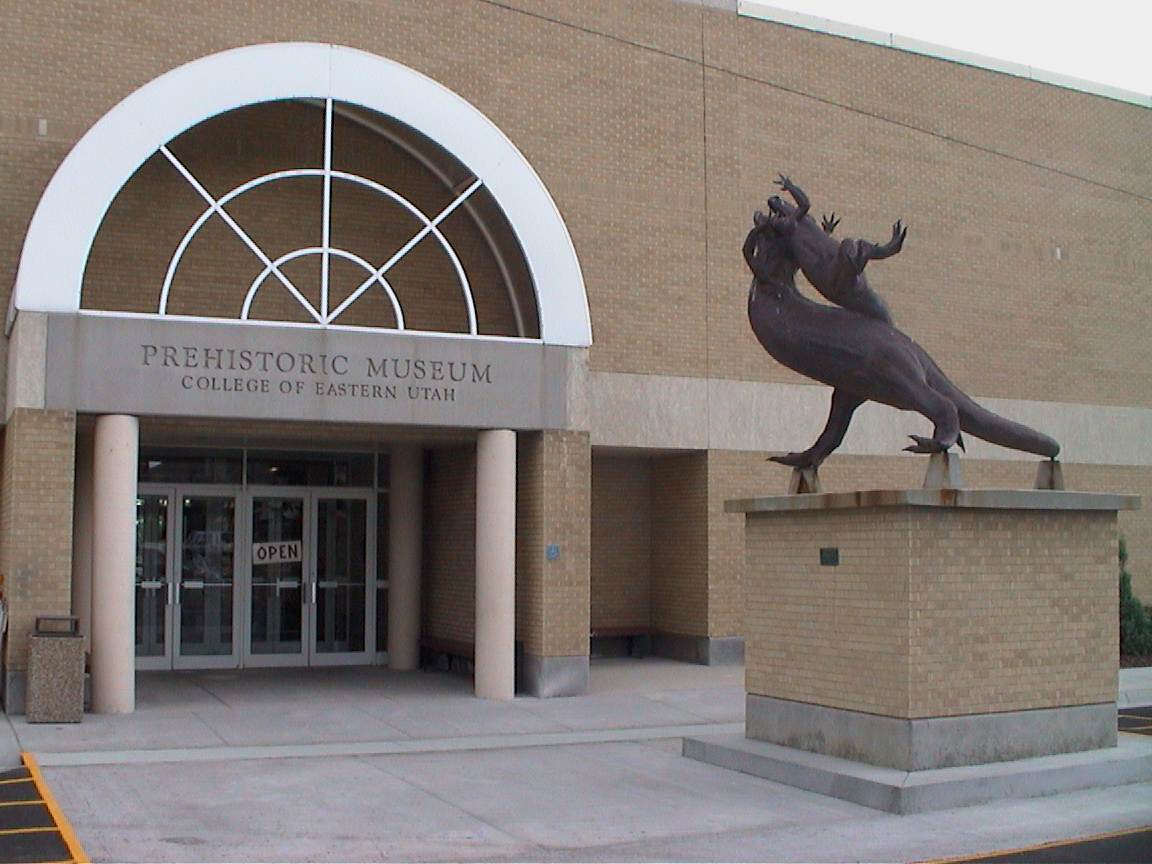
USU Eastern Prehistoric Museum (©2001 SW Clyde, courtesy of byways.org)

Utah State University Eastern (USU Eastern) is a public regional college within the Utah State University system. The USU Eastern campus is located in Price, Utah, United States. Founded as Carbon College in 1937, the college joined the University of Utah system in 1959 for 10 years and was renamed College of Eastern Utah (CEU). In 1969, the Utah System of Higher Education was created ending the relationship between the University of Utah and CEU. CEU entered the USU system on July 1, 2010 as Utah State University Eastern. With more than 60 degree programs, the college focuses on technical, vocational, and associate degree programs. USU Eastern competes as the Eagles and is the only statewide USU campus, apart from the Logan campus, that has an athletics program.

== History ==
Carbon College was formed on February 20, 1937 by the State of Utah and classes began in October 1938 with approximately 100 students. The newly formed college faced financial difficulties in 1953 when a budget-cutting measure was proposed to dismantle the college and sell the property. The issue went to the ballot during the election of 1954 with 56,000 petition signatures and a subsequent 78% of the vote to reject such a measure.

In 1959, the college was joined with the University of Utah and acted as a branch of the University for 10 years. During the partnership, the campus grew significantly and the college became known as College of Eastern Utah (CEU). During the 1960s, CEU added several new buildings including the Geary Theater, Music Building, Science Center, and Library. In 1969, the Utah System of Higher Education was created ending the relationship between the University of Utah and CEU.

During the 1970s, CEU began to focus on the mission of being a vocational-technical school for the community. Degrees were expanded to include welding, automotive mechanics, machine shop, cosmetology, diesel mechanics, and a registered nursing program. CEU expanded courses to be taught at the San Juan Center. After the start of the 21st century, courses and enrollment began to climb to more than 2,000 students enrolled in more than 400 courses.

In 2010, the College of Eastern Utah merged with Utah State University creating Utah State University Eastern (USU Eastern). Shortly after the merger, Joe Peterson, a former vice president of instruction at Salt Lake Community College, became the school's first chancellor, reporting directly to USU president Stan L. Albrecht.

== Campus ==
Situated in the center of Price, Utah, USU Eastern's campus is set on about 12 acres (4.9 ha) and is surrounded by geological and recreational features including the San Rafael Swell, Arches National Park, Canyonlands National Park, and the Cleveland-Lloyd Dinosaur Quarry. It is one of USU’s three residential campuses to ensure students have access to housing and dining while attending USU Eastern.

USU Eastern is also home to an accredited museum, the renowned USU Eastern Prehistoric Museum. In 2011, Utah State University received a confidential gift of 25 acres near the USU Eastern campus, nearly tripling the size of the campus. The estimated value for the donation exceeds $4 million. The City of Price and USU have already been working on the USU Energy and Education Research Park just west of the donated parcel of land.

== Academics ==
USU Eastern offers more than 60 degree programs in academic, technical, and vocational fields.

Discipline and degree options include anthropology, criminal justice, museum studies, biology, geology, business, diesel equipment technology, and small business development. USU Eastern operates under an open admissions policy, meaning that if one applies and has either graduated from high school or earned a GED, they are accepted. Since 2020, Utah State University, including USU Eastern, has been test-optional, meaning students do not need to submit ACT/SAT scores for admission.

== Athletics ==
Utah State Eastern compete as the Utah State Eastern Eagles. Located in Price, Utah, the university is the only campus in the USU statewide system, other than the main campus in Logan, to maintain a separate intercollegiate athletics program. The Eagles compete primarily in the National Junior College Athletic Association (NJCAA) in Region 18 and the Scenic West Athletic Conference (SWAC).

Athletic Programs

Utah State Eastern sponsors seven NJCAA athletic programs: men's baseball, basketball, and soccer; and women's basketball, soccer, softball and volleyball.

The university also offers competitive opportunities in archery, mountain biking, and rodeo outside the NJCAA structure. Its spirit squad consists of cheerleading and dance teams. The university mascot is Emmett the Eagle.

Men's and women's soccer were added in 2014, expanding the university's intercollegiate athletics offerings.

Dance, rodeo, and softball was added in 2016.

Mountain biking and archery were added in 2025.

Athletic Facilities

The Bunnell-Dmitrich Athletic Center (BDAC) serves as teh university's primary indoor atthletics facility, hosting men's and women's basketball and women's volleyball. The facility also includes athletic department offices, athletic training areas, hospitality room, film room, locker rooms, and is connected to the fitness area shared by students, faculty, staff, and community members.

Other venues include:

- Castleview Hospital Soccer Field : home of the men's and women's soccer programs on the Price Campus
- Ernie Garner Field: Home of the baseball program in Helper, Utah. Originally constructed in 1923, the historic ballpark became the Eagles' home venue in 2025 following a partnership between Utah State Eastern and Helper City.
- Heritage Field: Home of the softball prgram in Helper, Utah under the same partnership with Helper City.

Athletic Achievements

Utah State Eastern athletic programs have earned conference and district championships and competed in NJCAA national championships.

The women's volleyball program completed one of its most successful seasons in 2024, compiling a 25-8 record and winning the Scenic West Athletic Conference regular season championship, Region 18 Tournament chamionship, and Rocky Mountain District A championship. The Eagles advanced to the NJCAA Division I Women's Volleyball Championship, finished seventh nationally. The season marked the programs first Outright SWAC regular-season championship and first Region 18 Trounament title.

The women's basketball program earned a share of the Scenic West Athletic Conferenc regular season championship during the 2019-2020 season, finishing with a 24-6 overall record.

Other programs including baseball, men and womens soccer, softball, rodeo, mountain biking, and cheer and dance have achieved regional, district, and/or national recognition.

Academic Achievements

Utah State Eastern student-athletes have earned academic recognition through the NJCAA All-Academic program and national team academic awards.

Student athletes regularly earn a cummulative GPA between 3.2-3.4 over the past several years.

During the 2024-2025 academic year, the women's soccer program was named the NJCAA Women's Co-Academic Team of the Year, achieving a 3.79 team GPA. In 25-26 they received a 3.78 ranking third nationally.

Athletic Administration and Development

Jess Brinkerhoff was appointed Director of Athletics in January 2022, succeeding long time baseball coach and athletic director Scott Madsen, with womens basketball coach Chelsey Warburton also serving for a short period. Previously Coach Dave Paur who served as womens basketball coach and athletic director from 1989-2015 was the long time administrator.

During Brinkerhoff's tenure, the department has expanded its fundraising and sponsorship activties, developed additional revenue through athletic camps, community partnerships, and undertaken improvements to athletic facilities and student-athlete services.

Facility developments during this period have included upgrades to the BDAC athletic training and fitness areas, installation of a video board, score tables, and collaboration with community partner facilities.

The department has also expanded its student-athlete development initiatives, including an emphasis on academic performance, community engagment, and sportsmanship. Several athletic programs have achieved national rankings and competed in championship events during this period.

Brinkerhoff has also served in regional and national NJCAA administrative roles within Region 18 as the Men's Region Director since 2023, and the NJCAA Division I Womens Soccer Chair since 2025.

Community Involvement

Utah State Eastern athletic programs participate in the community outreach and service activites throughout Carbon and Emery counties. Activities include youth sports camps, school visits, reading programs, community improvement projects, and collaborations with local organizations.

During the 25-26 academic year, the athletic department reported participation in 110 community engagment events involving student-athletes, coaches, and staff. These activites included youth mentorship, elementary school outreach, service projects, and community partnerships.

== Notable alumni ==
- Harold Arceneaux, former professional basketball player
- Willie Eyre, former MLB player
- Eddie Gill, former NBA player
- Darington Hobson, former NBA player
- Ime Udoka, NBA coach for the Houston Rockets
- Kevin J Worthen, former president of Brigham Young University
