= Utah Tech University =

Public university in St. George, Utah, US

- Former names: St. George Stake Academy (1911–1913); Dixie Academy (1913–1916); Dixie Normal College (1916–1923); Dixie Junior College (1923–1970); Dixie College (1970–2000); Dixie State College (2000–2013); Dixie State University (2013–2022)
- Motto: Active Learning, Active Life
- Type: Public university
- Established: September 19, 1911; 115 years ago
- Parent institution: Utah System of Higher Education
- Accreditation: NWCCU
- Endowment: $40.2 million (2025)
- President: Shane B. Smeed
- Faculty: 423
- Students: 12,556 (fall 2022)
- Undergraduates: 12,481 (fall 2022)
- Postgraduates: 75 (fall 2022)
- Location: St. George, Utah, US; 37°06′16.1″N 113°33′54.7″W
- Campus: Urban * Dixie (main) campus: 100.11 acres (41 ha) * Off-campus property: 97.1 acres (39 ha)
- Colors: Red, navy blue, and white
- Nicknames: Trailblazers (previously "The Rebels")
- Sporting affiliations: NCAA Division I FCS — Big Sky Conference
- Mascot: "Brooks the Bison"
- Website: www.utahtech.edu

Utah Tech University (UT), formerly Dixie State University (DSU), is a public polytechnic university in St. George, Utah, United States. UT offers doctoral degrees, master's degrees, bachelor's degrees, associate degrees, and certifications. As of fall 2022, there were 12,556 students enrolled at UT.

Located in "Utah's Dixie", the institution began as the St. George Stake Academy, founded in 1911 by the Church of Jesus Christ of Latter-day Saints (LDS Church) and sponsored by its local stake. In 1935, it became a state school of the Utah System of Higher Education. From 1923 until 1970 it was a two-year junior college named Dixie Junior College. In 2021, after continued controversy over the use of the term "Dixie" in the school's name, the Utah State Legislature and the Governor of Utah approved the bill that allowed the school to be renamed as Utah Tech.

UT's 16 athletic teams compete in Division I of the National Collegiate Athletic Association (NCAA) and have been known since 2016 as the Trailblazers. UT was reclassified from Division II to Division I in 2019 and joined the Western Athletic Conference (WAC) in the 2020–2021 season. When the Trailblazers were in NCAA Division II, the football team had been part of the Rocky Mountain Athletic Conference since 2014, while the Women's Swimming team competed in the Pacific Collegiate Swim Conference, and the school's 14 other athletic teams competed in the PacWest Conference.

== History ==
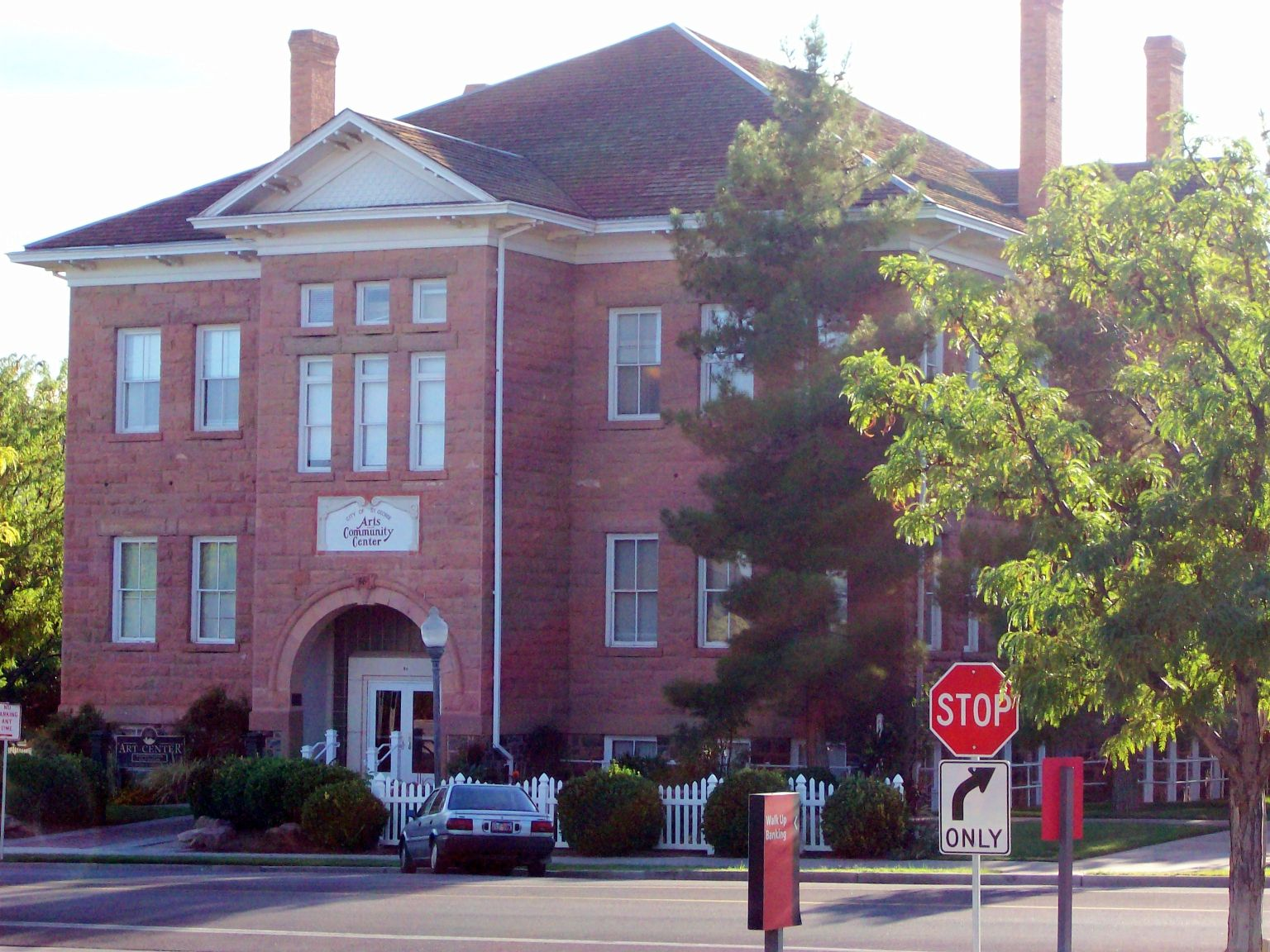
The former Dixie Academy building in St. George, the original home of St. George Stake Academy

Originally a secondary school institution, it was founded by the LDS Church and its local stake on September 19, 1911, as the St. George Stake Academy. The academy, located in a region long referred to as "Utah's Dixie" by LDS Church president and governor of the Utah Territory Brigham Young, and local settlers in the southern portion of Utah. was renamed to the Dixie Academy in 1913, Beginning in 1916, it was known as Dixie Normal College, and then became Dixie Junior College in 1923. In 1933, the LDS Church discontinued its financial support of the institution, and rather than give up on it, the local citizenry came together and maintained its operation through donations and labor for the following two years during the Great Depression.

In 1935, the Utah State Board of Education took over the funding for the school, but wanted to split the college students from the high school students, with the high school moving away and relocated with a separate building under the direction of Washington County local government and its public school system. The community resisted, feeling that the approximate 200 college students and similar number of high school students needed to be combined to provide a good-sized student body for the many social and higher quality of the academic curriculum programs. Another concern was that the county did not simply yet have the tax revenue and available funds to build a new high school building during the Great Depression era.

In the three decades between 1935 and 1963, there were close calls when various state leaders proposed closing the college, but local citizens were willing to donate and support it to keep it alive. These local citizens, particularly the Dixie Education Association, raised the funds to purchase four city blocks of land on the 700 East and 100 South streets for a new school campus. They presented that land to the state which, in turn, agreed to fund a few buildings for a new campus there. In 1957, the Old Gymnasium was finished and by 1963, four other newly-constructed buildings were ready for college students with the high school students still remaining on the previous older downtown campus. In 1970, the college name was changed again from the Dixie Junior College of the previous 47 years and shortened to Dixie College, signifying its expansion of the number to four years of a collegiate education and empowered to award bachelor's degrees like a full senior college.

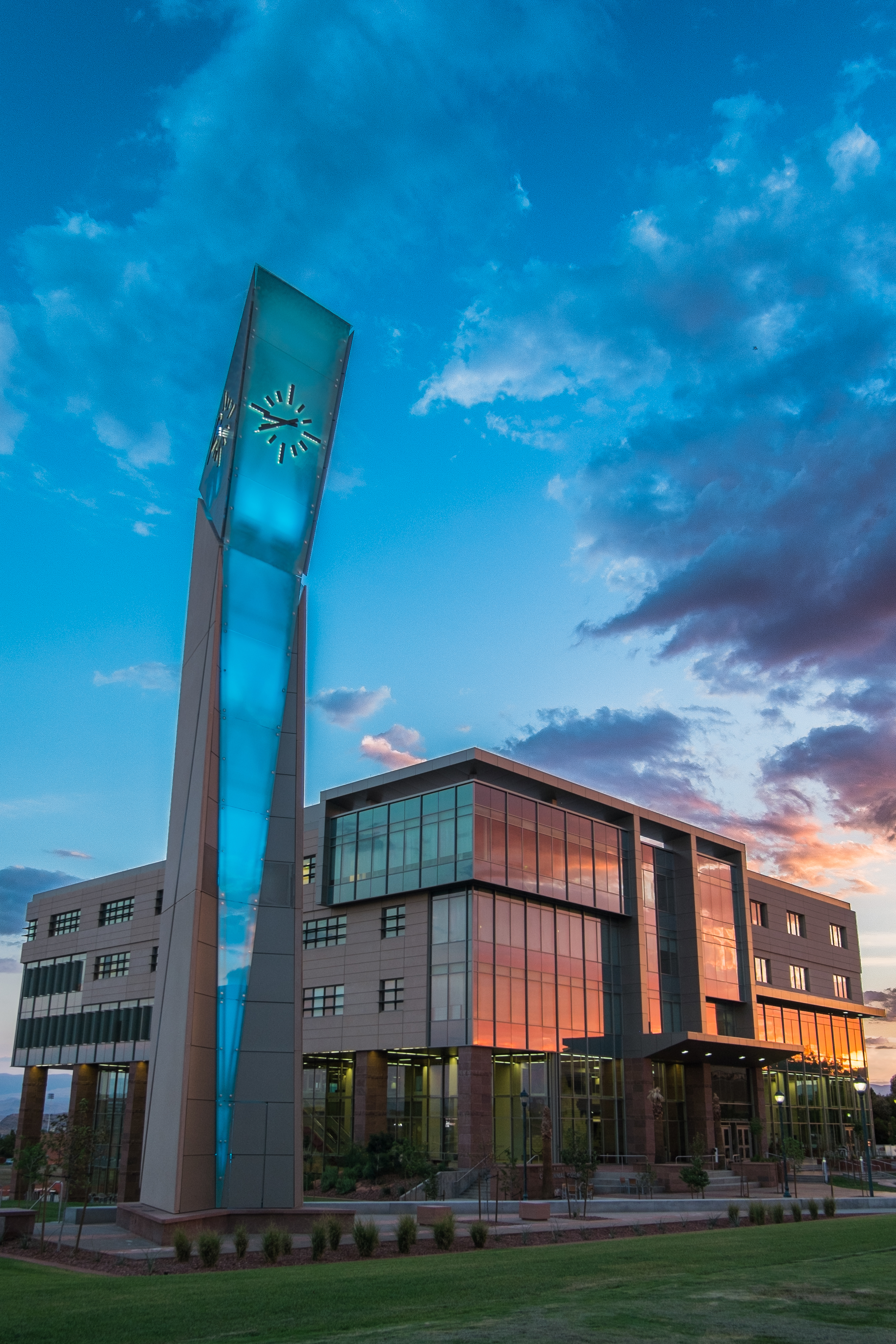
UT Holland Centennial Commons and Clock Tower campus landmark in the plaza

On September 7, 2007, the Dixie State College Board of Trustees members announced that Dixie State College of Utah would petition the University of Utah to become a branch campus known as the University of Utah–St. George. The proposal was approved by the Dixie State College Board of Trustees on October 7, 2007, and by the University of Utah Board of Trustees on October 14, 2007; however, this did not officially come to fruition.

In 2011, a bill was drafted for review by the Utah State Legislature and the Governor of Utah to support Dixie State College's transition to university status.

The institution contracted with a local advertising firm, Sorenson Advertising, to investigate and survey future names for the college if it were approved to become a university and found that alumni overwhelmingly supported the name Dixie while less than half of faculty/staff supported the name Dixie (p. 48). Controversy over the name Dixie has arisen many times. In December 2020, the new university's board of trustees unanimously voted to recommend removing the word Dixie from the school's longtime name and title.

In 2013, the Utah Legislature passed a bill changing the status of the institution from a college to a university and named it "Dixie State University". Utah Governor Gary Herbert signed the bill into law in a ceremony on the St. George campus on February 16, 2013. That same year, the board of trustees approved a student-driven proposed campus-wide tobacco ban. The ban prohibits all varieties of tobacco products, including the newest invention of electronic cigarettes. The ban went into effect on January 1, 2014.

Also in 2013, DSU student Indigo Klabanoff pushed for the creation of a sorority for women students and its financial support. The DSU board did not approve it or the subsequent creation of social clubs or similar associations with Greek letters in their names (excepting academic honor societies), because they said introducing Greek Life properly requires significant funding and the inherent "partying" stereotype of a Greek system was not a culture they wanted to encourage on campus.

=== "Dixie" name, old Confederacy symbols, and mascot changes ===
The Dixie College sports teams were called the "Rebels" starting in 1952 and a Confederate soldier was used as a mascot starting four years later in 1956. Until 1994, the university used the Confederate Battle Flag as a school symbol (and for a time, still used a reminiscent pattern of red, white and blue colors with patterns of stripes with stars after dropping it), and the college annual yearbook was called The Confederate. The Salt Lake Tribune described the college yearbooks containing "troubling photos, some as late as the early 1990s", in which "White students sing in black face, dress as Confederate soldiers, stage slave auctions and affectionately display the Confederate battle standard."

In 2009, the college dropped its "Rodney the Rebel" mascot and "the Rebels" as the name for the sports teams, renaming the teams to the "Red Storm", with a bull mascot. In 2016, the UT athletics team name was eventually changed to the "Trailblazers" with "Brooks the Bison" as the mascot.

Dixie State University (DSU) institutional logo (2013–2022)

The process of changing the university's name began in June 2020 during the George Floyd protests in the midst of the 2020–2022 racial unrest and the Black Lives Matter movement. In December 2020, both the university board of trustees and the Utah Board of Higher Education unanimously voted to recommend a name change to both chambers of the bicameral Utah Legislature, which established the name in state law. Although the state legislature delegated the task to a committee that collected suggestions and decided on Utah Polytechnic State University, the Dixie board of trustees recommended Utah Tech University after the original proposed name received negative community input. The Utah System of Higher Education voted unanimously to recommend the name change to UT, which the Utah State Legislature approved with the condition that the main St. George campus will be named the "Dixie Campus" of UT. The name change took effect July 1, 2022.

=== 2014 termination of a professor ===
In December 2014, theater professor Varlo Davenport received a notice of dismissal and termination of academic employment in connection with a student complaint of an alleged assault, but because of his academic tenured status he was allowed to request a termination appeal hearing as outlined in DSU Policy. A reinstatement petition was started by students that ultimately garnered over 1,400 signatures, and many letters were also sent to the State Board of Regents from the community and faculty members. A faculty review board convened, and after hearing testimony and evidence from both sides, recommended Davenport's reinstatement. In the final review of the hearing evidence and testimony, university president Richard Williams found the faculty review board's recommendation to be contrary to the information presented. He rejected the recommendation and upheld the termination. Members of the faculty review board subsequently met with Williams, pressing for a change in his decision. They were unsuccessful. The City of St. George filed Class B misdemeanor charges in Justice Court and a trial was held in 2016, with the jury finding the professor not guilty.

=== 2015 accusation of censorship ===
In 2015, in accordance with school policy, three students requested permission from the university to post fliers with satirical images of former U.S. President George W. Bush, and Cuban revolutionary leader Che Guevara, on campus. The university rejected the request because the fliers violated school policy by mocking people. The three students filed a lawsuit against DSU in federal court, stating that the university violated their Constitutional right to free speech with an overly restrictive and overly vague school policy. A few months later, DSU settled the lawsuit with the three plaintiffs involved in the case. The university agreed to pay the students $50,000 total in damages and their attorney fees. The university also agreed to revise its free speech policies that the three plaintiffs said were too restrictive and vague.

== Campus ==
The primary campus of UT, known as the Dixie Campus, is in St. George, Utah. The Hurricane Education Center campus extension located in Hurricane, Utah, is 20 minutes to the east. At the center of UT campus is the Encampment Mall, where Mormon pioneers first camped when they arrived in 1861 to settle and grow cotton in the desert.

UT has also expanded its campus to surrounding communities by adding new community education centers that offer concurrent enrollment and college-level classes.

- Kanab Center, located at Kanab High School in Kanab.
- Water Canyon Center, located at Water Canyon High School in Hildale, opened in May 2022.
- Panguitch Center, located at Panguitch High School in Panguitch, opened in September 2022.

The Utah State legislature granted UT over $55 million in 2022 to build a 120,000 square-foot General Classroom Building which is set to open in fall 2025. The building will have 45 classrooms, 105 faculty offices, and 20 study rooms.

=== Atwood Innovation Plaza ===
The Atwood Innovation Plaza on UT's campus provides resources to students and the St. George community at large for business and idea development. Students and community members have access to free consultations and an incubator workspace through the Business Resource Center, tools to create prototypes and perform small-run manufacturing through the Makerspace, assistance with research, patents, trademarks, and copyrights through Innovation Guidance & Solutions, and help getting businesses off the ground through the Startup Incubator. Since opening, the Atwood Innovation Plaza has helped to submit 195 patents with 100 of those patents being granted along with helping to secure 104 trademarks and 22 copyrights.

== Academics ==
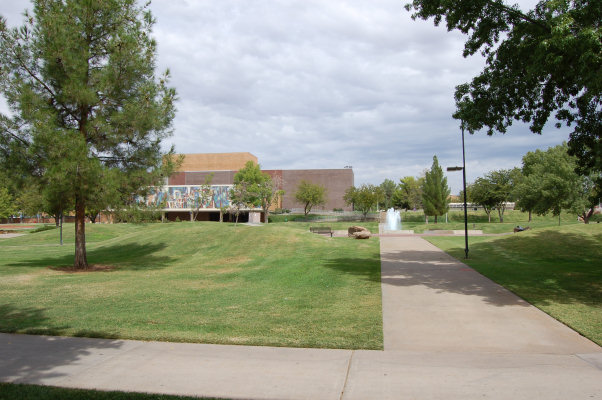
O. C. Tanner Fountain Plaza, on the campus of Utah Tech University

As of June 2021, Utah Tech University offered 242 academic programs, including 4 master's degree programs, 53 bachelor's degree programs with 70 different emphases, 18 associate degree programs, 45 minors, and 52 certificate and endorsement options. On January 26, 2018, the university added its first graduate degree program, a Master of Accountancy. The university's first doctoral degree, a clinical doctorate in occupational therapy, was approved by the Utah Board of Higher Education in July 2022.

The university is organized into seven academic colleges:

- College of the Arts
- College of Business
- College of Education
- College of Health Sciences
- College of Humanities and Social Sciences
- College of Science, Engineering, and Technology
- University College

=== Polytechnic academic model ===
In 2016, UT made the decision to pivot its curriculum towards becoming a comprehensive polytechnic university. A polytechnic model was selected because it relies on the university's instructional model of "active learning. active life," that focuses on career preparation and engagement in regional economic and workforce growth and development. UT specializes in three core principles of a polytechnic university, including active and applied student learning, student career preparation and development, and industry collaboration.

=== Booth Honors Program ===
The mission of the Booth Honors Program at Utah Tech is to "attract a diverse community of highly capable and motivated individuals who challenge one another in a lifelong pursuit of learning." The Honors Program allows students access to priority registration, scholarship opportunities that provide students with research and travel grants, and small, discussion formatted classes that cover a wide range of topics, like HON 3010: Science and Nature Writing or HON 3010: Super Heroes and Citizenship. Students involved in the Honors Program are also granted access to an exclusive honors space in the Holland Centennial Commons, which serves as a spot for students to study, read, meet and socialize with other Honors students.

== Student life ==
Undergraduate demographics as of Fall 2023
Race and ethnicity	Total
White	75%
Hispanic	14%
Two or more races	5%
Black	2%
International student	2%
American Indian/Alaska Native	1%
Asian	1%
Native Hawaiian/Pacific Islander	1%
Unknown	1%
Economic diversity
Low-income (Note: The percentage of students who received an income-based federal Pell grant intended for low-income students.)	34%
Affluent (Note: The percentage of students who are a part of the American middle class at the bare minimum.)	66%

UT's Student Association (UTSA) is a federated student administrative body overseeing the functions, funding, and promotion of official student organizations. Executive and legislative power is primarily vested in an elected Executive Council, the President's Cabinet, and the Student Senate. Student clubs interact with the UTSA governing bodies primarily through non-elected Club Representatives. Club Representatives work on behalf of the following organizational categories: Academic Clubs, Student Organizations, Non-Traditional Clubs, Multicultural and Diversity Clubs, Health Science Clubs, and Athletic and Recreation Clubs. All Executive Council members and most Managers receive some sort of financial aid in return for their work.

Various responsibilities fall to UTSA including the planning of most on-campus events, charity and service work, and relations between university students and the school's faculty and surrounding community. Any student is able to apply for any position in UTSA, and if chosen is asked to maintain good academic and community standing, while abiding by the university's other rules and bylaws.

The UTSA Inter-Club Council (ICC) comprises all the university club presidents and UTSA's Club Council. ICC meetings are held bi-weekly and club presidents are encouraged to attend.

Utah Tech University has over 85 clubs for students to join, including the Hiking Club, Japanese Culture Club, Trailgazers Astronomy Club, and the Healthy Trailblazers Coalition.

=== Housing ===
UT provides students with single student and family student housing options. Single student housing includes Campus View Suites I, Campus View Suites II, Abby Apartments, and Chancellor Apartments. Family student housing includes Tech View Apartments and Morgan Apartments. Campus View Suites I & II offer students access to a fitness room, community kitchens, a basketball court, a pickleball court, a sand volleyball court, barbecue areas, a hammock garden and Brooks’ Stop Grill & Market. Campus View Suites III is set to open in fall 2024 to accommodate the growing student population.

=== Outdoor recreation ===
With 300 days of sunshine, an average temperature of 77 degrees, and 0 annual inches of snowfall, outdoor recreation is a popular student activity at Utah Tech, with many participating in activities like hiking, rock climbing, and biking. The university is a 50-minute drive from Zion National Park, a 2-hour drive from Bryce Canyon National Park, and a 20-minute drive from Snow Canyon State Park.

=== Greek Life ===
UT students started an unchartered chapter of Kappa Sigma fraternity in 2019, which has been operational off-campus without an official tie to the institution. As of the 2025-26 academic year, UT emphasizes and promotes engagement in a variety of accessible ways but does not have plans to sponsor a Greek Life program.

== Athletics ==
UT competes in NCAA Division I as a recent full member of the WAC. Previously, Dixie played in the Intermountain Collegiate Athletic Conference. The teams are collectively known as the UT Trailblazers (new nickname unveiled on April 11, 2016.) In July 2020, Dixie State began the multi-year reclassification process to NCAA Division I. The Trailblazers began competition against Division I opponents in the 2020–21 season in the WAC, though the football program competed as a FCS independent for a single season, as the WAC re-established sponsorship of football. After the 2022 season, the WAC merged its football league with that of another FCS group, the ASUN Conference, forming the football-only United Athletic Conference, with Utah Tech as one of its nine inaugural members. UT Tech has both a men's and women's wrestling teams that compete in Division 1 of the National Collegiate Wrestling Association (NCWA) in the West Coast Conference.

The Trailblazers have won 16 PacWest Championships, 5 PacWest Community Engagement Awards, and have appeared in 34 NCAA Division II tournaments. The men's basketball team appeared in the "sweet sixteen" group of semi-finalists in 2011 and the women's volleyball first appeared in 2014. The women's softball team has appeared in the College World Series three times and finished as runner up of the 2015 College World Series. The Trailblazers soccer team, won the PacWest 2016 championship by going 13–0, for the first time in school history. They also earned 11 PacWest Postseason Honors. The women's wrestling team placed 2nd in the nation in 2025 and 4th in 2024 with 3 national champs and 11 all-Americans. The men's wrestling team placed 9th in the nation in 2025 and 8th in 2024 and boast 1 national champion and 7 all-Americans.

Men's sports	Women's sports
Baseball	Basketball
Basketball	Cross country
Cross Country	Golf
Football	Soccer
Golf	Softball
Soccer	Swimming and diving
Wrestling	Tennis
	Track and field
	Volleyball
	Wrestling

Athletic facilities include Greater Zion Stadium, Burns Arena, the Old Gymnasium in the Student Activities Center, Bruce Hurst Field, Karl Brooks Field, the Human Performance Center, the Utah Tech Tennis Courts, and the Frank Habibian Wrestling and Athletic Center.

== Notable alumni ==
- Mike Affleck, professional football player
- Nolan D. Archibald, CEO of Black & Decker
- Sark Arslanian, college football coach
- Jerry Atkin, founder and CEO of SkyWest, Inc.
- Rick Baird, member of the U.S. bobsled team, 1998–2003
- Maurice Baker, professional basketball player
- Marcus Banks, professional basketball player
- Juanita Brooks, historian
- Josh Burkman, football player turned martial artist
- M. Anthony Burns, CEO of Ryder, 1983–2000
- Howard W. Cannon, U.S. Senator from Nevada, 1959–1983
- Corey Dillon, professional football player
- Bruce C. Hafen, LDS Church leader, president of Ricks College, 1978–1985
- Cresent Hardy, Nevada State Assemblyman and member of the United States House of Representatives, 2015–2017
- Jeffrey R. Holland, president of Brigham Young University 1980–1989; apostle of the LDS Church 1994–2025
- Lionel Hollins, professional basketball player and coach
- Wendy Horman, Idaho State Representative, 2012–current
- Bruce Hurst, professional baseball player
- Brandon Kintzler, professional baseball player
- Brandon Lyon, professional baseball player
- Reno "Junior" Mahe, professional football player
- Anton Palepoi, professional football player
- Kris Paronto, US Army Ranger, CIA contractor
- Gregory Prince, pathology researcher and Mormon historian
- Raven Quinn, musician, singer, and songwriter
- Neil Roberts, basketball player and coach
- Dave Rose, college basketball coach
- Junior Siavii, professional football player
- Barry Sims, professional football player
- Brad Thompson, professional baseball player
- John "Cat" Thompson, professional basketball player
- Scott Young, professional football player

== See also ==
- Dixie Rotary Bowl
- List of name changes due to the George Floyd protests
- Southern Utah International Documentary Film Festival
