= Utah Tech Trailblazers football =

Football program representing Utah Tech University

2026 Utah Tech Trailblazers football team
- First season: 2006; 20 years ago
- Head coach: Lance Anderson; 3rd season, 3–21 (.125)
- Location: St. George, Utah
- Stadium: Greater Zion Stadium (capacity: 10,000)
- NCAA division: Division I FCS
- Conference: Big Sky
- Colors: Red, navy blue, and white
- All-time record: 64–150 (.299)
- Rivalries: Southern Utah (rivalry)

The Utah Tech Trailblazers football team, formerly known as the Dixie State Trailblazers, (Note: Dixie State has had various calls for a name change over the years, but it became official when the Utah State Legislature voted in Nov. 2021 to change their name to Utah Tech University, effective July 1, 2022. They will maintain their mascot of Trailblazers which they have had since 2016.) represent Utah Tech University in the sport of American football. The Trailblazers compete as a member of the Big Sky Conference at the NCAA Division I Football Championship Subdivision (FCS) level in the National Collegiate Athletic Association. Originally a junior college program, the school joined the NCAA at the Division II level in 2006 and played in the Great Northwest Athletic Conference from 2008 through 2016 and the Rocky Mountain Athletic Conference for the 2017, 2018, and 2019 seasons. In July 2020, they began the transition to NCAA Division I status by moving to the Western Athletic Conference (WAC) in all sports except football.

In July 2021, the WAC reinstated football as a sponsored sport, playing at the FCS level. This coincided with the arrival of four new members that play FCS football; with Southern Utah University set to join in 2022. After the 2022 season, the WAC fully merged its football league with that of the ASUN Conference, creating what eventually became the United Athletic Conference, and Utah Tech accordingly moved its football team to the new league. season. Due to NCAA transfer rules, Utah Tech was ineligible for the FCS playoffs from 2020 to 2024. However, Utah Tech is now eligible for FCS Playoff competition as of the 2024 season.

== Future non-conference opponents ==
Announced schedules as of October 28, 2025.

2026	2027	2028	2029	2030
at BYU	at Fresno State	at Utah	at San Jose State	at Utah
at Montana				
Northern Arizona				
