= List of Portland State Vikings head football coaches =

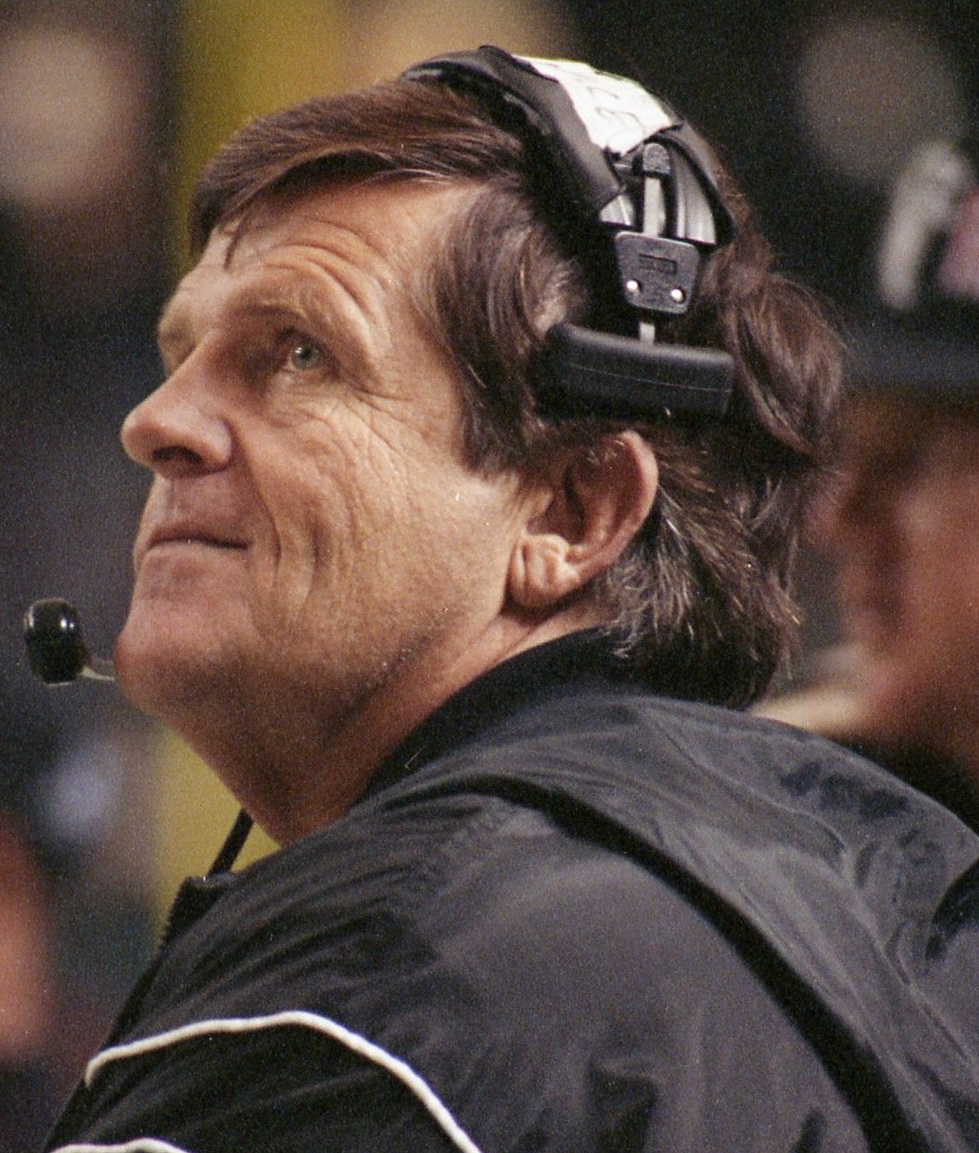
Jerry Glanville, 12th head coach of the Portland State Vikings

The Portland State Vikings college football team represents Portland State University (Note: Since 1946, what is now known as Portland State University was also known as Vanport Extension Center from 1946 to 1951.) in the Big Sky Conference (Big Sky). The Vikings compete as part of the National Collegiate Athletic Association (NCAA) Division I Football Championship (FCS). The program has had 15 head coaches since it began play during the 1947 season. Since December 2025, Chris Fisk has served as the head coach at Portland State.

The team has played nearly 700 games over 65 seasons of Portland State football. In that time, two coaches have led the Vikings to postseason appearances: Pokey Allen and Tim Walsh. Three coaches also won conference championships: Jerry Lyons won two as a member of the Oregon Collegiate Conference; Don Read and Allen won a combined six as a member of the Western Football Conference. Walsh is the leader in seasons coached with fourteen years with the program. Walsh is also the leader in games won with 90 and Allen has the highest winning percentage of those who have coached more than one game, with .703. Ron Stratten and Jerry Glanville are tied with the lowest winning percentage of those who have coached more than one game, with .273.

== Key ==
Key to symbols in coaches list
General		Overall		Conference		Postseason (Note: Although the first Rose Bowl Game was played in 1902, it has been continuously played since the 1916 game, and is recognized as the oldest bowl game by the NCAA. "—" indicates any season prior to 1916 when postseason games were not played.)	
No.	Order of coaches (Note: A running total of the number of head coaches, with coaches who served separate tenures being counted only once. Interim head coaches are represented with "Int" and are not counted in the running total. "—" indicates the team played but either without a coach or no coach is on record. "X" indicates an interim year without play.)	GC	Games coached	CW	Conference wins	PW	Postseason wins
DC	Division championships	OW	Overall wins	CL	Conference losses	PL	Postseason losses
CC	Conference championships	OL	Overall losses	CT	Conference ties	PT	Postseason ties
NC	National championships	OT	Overall ties (Note: Overtime rules in college football were introduced in 1996, making ties impossible in the period since.)	C%	Conference winning percentage		
†	Elected to the College Football Hall of Fame	O%	Overall winning percentage (Note: When computing the win–loss percentage, a tie counts as half a win and half a loss.)				

== Coaches ==
List of head football coaches showing season(s) coached, overall records, conference records, postseason records, championships and selected awards
No.	Name	Term	G	W	L	T	PCT	CW	CL	CT	PCT	PW	PL	PT	CCs	NCs	Awards
1	Joe Holland	1947–1954	65	20	42	3	0.331	5	10	1	0.344	0	0	0	0	0	—
2	Ralph Davis	1955–1956	16	4	11	1	0.281	2	6	0	0.250	0	0	0	0	0	—
3	Les Leggett	1957–1958	17	6	11	0	0.353	3	5	0	0.375	0	0	0	0	0	—
4	Hugh Smithwick	1959–1961	25	6	17	2	0.280	4	7	1	0.375	0	0	0	0	0	—
5	Tom DeSylvia	1962	8	4	4	0	0.500	3	1	0	0.750	0	0	0	0	0	—
6	Jerry Lyons	1963–1967	46	21	24	1	0.467	7	0	1	0.938	0	0	0	2	0	—
7	Don Read	1968–1971; 1981–1985	92	39	52	1	0.429	6	8	1	0.433	0	0	0	1	0	—
8	Ron Stratten	1972–1974	33	9	24	0	0.273	—	—	—	—	0	0	0	—	0	—
9	Mouse Davis	1975–1980	66	42	24	0	0.636	—	—	—	—	0	0	0	—	0	—
10	Pokey Allen	1986–1992	91	63	26	2	0.703	30	7	0	0.811	10	5	0	5	0	—
11	Tim Walsh	1993–2006	158	90	68	0	0.570	42	41	0	0.506	2	4	0	0	0	—
12	Jerry Glanville	2007–2009	33	9	24	—	0.273	7	17	—	0.292	0	0	—	0	0	—
13	Nigel Burton	2010–2014	57	21	36	—	0.368	12	27	—	0.308	0	0	—	0	0	—
14	Bruce Barnum	2015–2025	114	39	75	—	0.342	29	51	—	0.363	0	1	—	0	0	—
15	Chris Fisk	2026–present	0	0	0	—	–	0	0	—	–	0	0	—	0	0	—
