= List of Oregon Collegiate Conference football standings =

This is a list of yearly Oregon Collegiate Conference football standings.

== Oregon Collegiate Conference football standings ==
1950 Oregon Collegiate Conference football standings
| | Conf. | | | | | Overall |
| Team | W | | L | | T | W | | L | | T |
|---|---|---|---|---|---|---|---|---|---|---|
| Oregon College $ | 3 | – | 0 | – | 0 | 6 | – | 2 | – | 0 |
| Oregon Tech | 1 | – | 1 | – | 1 | 2 | – | 7 | – | 1 |
| Eastern Oregon | 1 | – | 2 | – | 0 | 1 | – | 8 | – | 0 |
| Vanport | 0 | – | 2 | – | 1 | 1 | – | 5 | – | 1 |
$ – Conference champion

1951 Oregon Collegiate Conference football standings
| | Conf. | | | | | Overall |
| Team | W | | L | | T | W | | L | | T |
|---|---|---|---|---|---|---|---|---|---|---|
| Oregon College $ | 3 | – | 0 | – | 0 | 6 | – | 0 | – | 1 |
| Oregon Tech | 2 | – | 1 | – | 0 | 6 | – | 3 | – | 0 |
| Vanport | 1 | – | 2 | – | 0 | 3 | – | 5 | – | 0 |
| Eastern Oregon | 0 | – | 3 | – | 0 | 3 | – | 6 | – | 0 |
$ – Conference champion

1952 Oregon Collegiate Conference football standings
| | Conf. | | | | | Overall |
| Team | W | | L | | T | W | | L | | T |
|---|---|---|---|---|---|---|---|---|---|---|
| Oregon College $ | 3 | – | 0 | – | 0 | 3 | – | 3 | – | 0 |
| Oregon Tech | 2 | – | 1 | – | 0 | 7 | – | 3 | – | 0 |
| Eastern Oregon | 1 | – | 2 | – | 0 | 3 | – | 5 | – | 0 |
| Portland State | 0 | – | 3 | – | 0 | 0 | – | 9 | – | 0 |
$ – Conference champion

1953 Oregon Collegiate Conference football standings
| | Conf. | | | | | Overall |
| Team | W | | L | | T | W | | L | | T |
|---|---|---|---|---|---|---|---|---|---|---|
| Oregon College $ | 3 | – | 0 | – | 0 | 4 | – | 4 | – | 0 |
| Portland State | 2 | – | 1 | – | 0 | 5 | – | 2 | – | 0 |
| Oregon Tech | 1 | – | 2 | – | 0 | 2 | – | 5 | – | 1 |
| Eastern Oregon | 0 | – | 3 | – | 0 | 1 | – | 7 | – | 0 |
$ – Conference champion

1954 Oregon Collegiate Conference football standings
| | Conf. | | | | | Overall |
| Team | W | | L | | T | W | | L | | T |
|---|---|---|---|---|---|---|---|---|---|---|
| Oregon Tech + | 3 | – | 1 | – | 0 | 6 | – | 4 | – | 0 |
| Oregon College + | 3 | – | 1 | – | 0 | 4 | – | 4 | – | 0 |
| Portland State | 2 | – | 2 | – | 0 | 3 | – | 5 | – | 0 |
| Southern Oregon | 2 | – | 2 | – | 0 | 2 | – | 5 | – | 0 |
| Eastern Oregon | 0 | – | 4 | – | 0 | 2 | – | 6 | – | 1 |
+ – Conference co-champions

1955 Oregon Collegiate Conference football standings
| | Conf. | | | | | Overall |
| Team | W | | L | | T | W | | L | | T |
|---|---|---|---|---|---|---|---|---|---|---|
| Eastern Oregon + | 3 | – | 1 | – | 0 | 5 | – | 3 | – | 0 |
| Oregon College + | 3 | – | 1 | – | 0 | 5 | – | 3 | – | 0 |
| Southern Oregon + | 3 | – | 1 | – | 0 | 4 | – | 5 | – | 0 |
| Portland State | 1 | – | 3 | – | 0 | 2 | – | 6 | – | 0 |
| Oregon Tech | 0 | – | 4 | – | 0 | 0 | – | 8 | – | 0 |
+ – Conference co-champions

1956 Oregon Collegiate Conference football standings
| | Conf. | | | | | Overall |
| Team | W | | L | | T | W | | L | | T |
|---|---|---|---|---|---|---|---|---|---|---|
| Eastern Oregon $ | 4 | – | 0 | – | 0 | 5 | – | 3 | – | 0 |
| Southern Oregon | 2 | – | 2 | – | 0 | 4 | – | 5 | – | 0 |
| Oregon College | 2 | – | 2 | – | 0 | 3 | – | 4 | – | 0 |
| Portland State | 1 | – | 3 | – | 0 | 2 | – | 5 | – | 1 |
| Oregon Tech | 1 | – | 3 | – | 0 | 4 | – | 4 | – | 1 |
$ – Conference champion

1957 Oregon Collegiate Conference football standings
| | Conf. | | | | | Overall |
| Team | W | | L | | T | W | | L | | T |
|---|---|---|---|---|---|---|---|---|---|---|
| Southern Oregon $ | 3 | – | 0 | – | 1 | 6 | – | 2 | – | 1 |
| Oregon College | 3 | – | 1 | – | 0 | 5 | – | 3 | – | 0 |
| Oregon Tech | 2 | – | 2 | – | 0 | 6 | – | 4 | – | 0 |
| Portland State | 1 | – | 3 | – | 0 | 2 | – | 6 | – | 0 |
| Eastern Oregon | 0 | – | 3 | – | 1 | 1 | – | 7 | – | 1 |
$ – Conference champion

1958 Oregon Collegiate Conference football standings
| | Conf. | | | | | Overall |
| Team | W | | L | | T | W | | L | | T |
|---|---|---|---|---|---|---|---|---|---|---|
| Oregon College $ | 4 | – | 0 | – | 0 | 5 | – | 4 | – | 0 |
| Southern Oregon | 3 | – | 1 | – | 0 | 5 | – | 5 | – | 0 |
| Portland State | 2 | – | 2 | – | 0 | 4 | – | 5 | – | 0 |
| Eastern Oregon | 1 | – | 3 | – | 0 | 1 | – | 8 | – | 0 |
| Oregon Tech * | 0 | – | 4 | – | 0 | 2 | – | 6 | – | 0 |
$ – Conference champion; * – Oregon Tech forfeited wins over Eastern Oregon, Oregon College, and Portland State due to ineligible players.

1959 Oregon Collegiate Conference football standings
| | Conf. | | | | | Overall |
| Team | W | | L | | T | W | | L | | T |
|---|---|---|---|---|---|---|---|---|---|---|
| Oregon Tech $ | 4 | – | 0 | – | 0 | 6 | – | 2 | – | 0 |
| Southern Oregon | 3 | – | 1 | – | 0 | 4 | – | 5 | – | 0 |
| Eastern Oregon | 2 | – | 2 | – | 0 | 3 | – | 6 | – | 0 |
| Portland State | 1 | – | 3 | – | 0 | 1 | – | 8 | – | 0 |
| Oregon College | 0 | – | 4 | – | 0 | 1 | – | 7 | – | 0 |
$ – Conference champion

1960 Oregon Collegiate Conference football standings
| | Conf. | | | | | Overall |
| Team | W | | L | | T | W | | L | | T |
|---|---|---|---|---|---|---|---|---|---|---|
| Oregon Tech $ | 4 | – | 0 | – | 0 | 9 | – | 0 | – | 0 |
| Southern Oregon | 3 | – | 1 | – | 0 | 5 | – | 4 | – | 0 |
| Portland State | 1 | – | 2 | – | 1 | 2 | – | 4 | – | 2 |
| Oregon College | 1 | – | 3 | – | 0 | 3 | – | 5 | – | 0 |
| Eastern Oregon | 0 | – | 3 | – | 1 | 0 | – | 7 | – | 2 |
$ – Conference champion

1961 Oregon Collegiate Conference football standings
| | Conf. | | | | | Overall |
| Team | W | | L | | T | W | | L | | T |
|---|---|---|---|---|---|---|---|---|---|---|
| Southern Oregon $ | 4 | – | 0 | – | 0 | 5 | – | 4 | – | 0 |
| Oregon College of Education | 2 | – | 1 | – | 1 | 4 | – | 3 | – | 1 |
| Portland State | 2 | – | 2 | – | 0 | 3 | – | 5 | – | 0 |
| Oregon Tech | 1 | – | 2 | – | 1 | 4 | – | 4 | – | 1 |
| Eastern Oregon | 0 | – | 4 | – | 0 | 1 | – | 7 | – | 0 |
$ – Conference champion

1962 Oregon Collegiate Conference football standings
| | Conf. | | | | | Overall |
| Team | W | | L | | T | W | | L | | T |
|---|---|---|---|---|---|---|---|---|---|---|
| Southern Oregon $ | 4 | – | 0 | – | 0 | 8 | – | 1 | – | 0 |
| Portland State | 3 | – | 1 | – | 0 | 4 | – | 4 | – | 0 |
| Oregon College | 2 | – | 2 | – | 0 | 4 | – | 4 | – | 0 |
| Oregon Tech | 1 | – | 3 | – | 0 | 2 | – | 6 | – | 0 |
| Eastern Oregon | 0 | – | 4 | – | 0 | 1 | – | 8 | – | 0 |
$ – Conference champion

1963 Oregon Collegiate Conference football standings
| | Conf. | | | | | Overall |
| Team | W | | L | | T | W | | L | | T |
|---|---|---|---|---|---|---|---|---|---|---|
| Portland State $ | 4 | – | 0 | – | 0 | 6 | – | 2 | – | 0 |
| Southern Oregon | 3 | – | 1 | – | 0 | 5 | – | 4 | – | 0 |
| Oregon Tech | 2 | – | 2 | – | 0 | 2 | – | 4 | – | 0 |
| Oregon College | 1 | – | 3 | – | 0 | 3 | – | 6 | – | 0 |
| Eastern Oregon | 0 | – | 4 | – | 0 | 1 | – | 8 | – | 0 |
$ – Conference champion

1964 Oregon Collegiate Conference football standings
| | Conf. | | | | | Overall |
| Team | W | | L | | T | W | | L | | T |
|---|---|---|---|---|---|---|---|---|---|---|
| Southern Oregon + | 3 | – | 0 | – | 1 | 6 | – | 2 | – | 1 |
| Portland State + | 3 | – | 0 | – | 1 | 4 | – | 4 | – | 1 |
| Oregon Tech | 2 | – | 2 | – | 0 | 3 | – | 3 | – | 1 |
| Eastern Oregon | 1 | – | 3 | – | 0 | 3 | – | 4 | – | 0 |
| Oregon College | 0 | – | 4 | – | 0 | 1 | – | 6 | – | 0 |
+ – Conference co-champions

1965 Oregon Collegiate Conference football standings
| | Conf. | | | | | Overall |
| Team | W | | L | | T | W | | L | | T |
|---|---|---|---|---|---|---|---|---|---|---|
| Southern Oregon $ | 4 | – | 0 | – | 0 | 5 | – | 3 | – | 1 |
| Oregon College | 2 | – | 2 | – | 0 | 5 | – | 3 | – | 1 |
| Eastern Oregon | 2 | – | 2 | – | 0 | 3 | – | 6 | – | 1 |
| Oregon Tech | 2 | – | 2 | – | 0 | 2 | – | 5 | – | 0 |
| George Fox | 0 | – | 4 | – | 0 | 0 | – | 8 | – | 0 |
$ – Conference champion

1966 Oregon Collegiate Conference football standings
| | Conf. | | | | | Overall |
| Team | W | | L | | T | W | | L | | T |
|---|---|---|---|---|---|---|---|---|---|---|
| Oregon College $ | 4 | – | 0 | – | 0 | 6 | – | 2 | – | 0 |
| Southern Oregon | 3 | – | 1 | – | 0 | 4 | – | 4 | – | 0 |
| Eastern Oregon | 2 | – | 2 | – | 0 | 3 | – | 5 | – | 0 |
| Oregon Tech | 1 | – | 3 | – | 0 | 1 | – | 7 | – | 0 |
| George Fox | 0 | – | 4 | – | 0 | 1 | – | 6 | – | 0 |
$ – Conference champion

1967 Oregon Collegiate Conference football standings
| | Conf. | | | | | Overall |
| Team | W | | L | | T | W | | L | | T |
|---|---|---|---|---|---|---|---|---|---|---|
| Southern Oregon + | 3 | – | 1 | – | 0 | 5 | – | 4 | – | 0 |
| Oregon College + | 3 | – | 1 | – | 0 | 4 | – | 4 | – | 0 |
| Eastern Oregon | 2 | – | 2 | – | 0 | 2 | – | 6 | – | 0 |
| Oregon Tech | 1 | – | 3 | – | 0 | 3 | – | 6 | – | 0 |
| George Fox | 1 | – | 3 | – | 0 | 1 | – | 6 | – | 0 |
+ – Conference co-champions

1968 Oregon Collegiate Conference football standings
| | Conf. | | | | | Overall |
| Team | W | | L | | T | W | | L | | T |
|---|---|---|---|---|---|---|---|---|---|---|
| Oregon College $ | 4 | – | 0 | – | 0 | 7 | – | 2 | – | 0 |
| Southern Oregon | 3 | – | 1 | – | 0 | 4 | – | 6 | – | 0 |
| Oregon Tech | 2 | – | 2 | – | 0 | 2 | – | 6 | – | 1 |
| Eastern Oregon | 1 | – | 3 | – | 0 | 1 | – | 8 | – | 0 |
| George Fox | 0 | – | 4 | – | 0 | 0 | – | 8 | – | 0 |
$ – Conference champion

1969 Oregon Collegiate Conference football standings
| | Conf. | | | | | Overall |
| Team | W | | L | | T | W | | L | | T |
|---|---|---|---|---|---|---|---|---|---|---|
| Oregon College $ | 3 | – | 0 | – | 0 | 6 | – | 3 | – | 0 |
| Oregon Tech | 1 | – | 2 | – | 0 | 4 | – | 5 | – | 0 |
| Eastern Oregon | 1 | – | 2 | – | 0 | 2 | – | 7 | – | 0 |
| Southern Oregon | 1 | – | 2 | – | 0 | 2 | – | 7 | – | 0 |
$ – Conference champion
