= Portland State Vikings =

Intercollegiate sports teams of Portland State University

- University: Portland State University
- Nickname: Vikings
- NCAA: Division I (FCS)
- Conference: Big Sky Conference
- Athletic director: Matt Billings
- Location: Portland, Oregon
- Varsity teams: 14
- Football stadium: Hillsboro Stadium
- Basketball arena: Viking Pavilion
- Softball stadium: Gordon Faber Recreation Complex
- Soccer stadium: Hillsboro Stadium
- Other venues: Blue Lake Regional Park; Langdon Farms Golf Club
- Colors: Green, white, and silver
- Mascot: Victor E. Viking
- Website: goviks.com

Portland State Vikings is the nickname of the NCAA-affiliated, intercollegiate athletic teams representing Portland State University of Portland, Oregon. The Vikings compete at the NCAA Division I level in basketball, soccer, volleyball, golf, tennis, softball, indoor and outdoor track and field, and cross country. The university has been a member of the Big Sky Conference since 1996. Along with the other Big Sky football programs, Viking football takes-part in the NCAA Division I Football Championship Subdivision (FCS), formerly known as NCAA Division I-AA.

== Overview ==
Prior to joining Division I, the school won NCAA National Division II Championships in women's volleyball and wrestling. The school has also placed second twice nationally in football and once in women's basketball at the Division II level. Portland State's colors are forest green and white, and its mascot is the Viking manifested as "Victor E. Viking".

Among the more notable former PSU athletes are Freeman Williams and Neil Lomax. Freeman Williams was the NCAA Division I national men's basketball individual scoring leader in 1977 and 1978. Neil Lomax was a record-setting quarterback who went on to star for the then St. Louis Cardinals in the NFL. Football's "Run & Shoot" offense was first implemented at the college level at PSU by then coach Darryl "Mouse" Davis. Davis' quarterback protégées were Lomax and June Jones. Jones, the former head coach at the University of Hawaiʻi and then at SMU, is also a proponent of the Run & Shoot. Portland State formerly had baseball until 1998, making the NCAA Tournament once in 1977.

Torre Chisholm was named new athletic director March 26, 2007. Chisholm replaced interim AD Teri Mariani, who filled that role since February 2006 when Tom Burman left for the University of Wyoming. Washington State University AD Jim Sterk preceded Burman as PSU AD. After an extensive nationwide search for an athletic director, John Johnson was selected by PSU president Stephen Percy and introduced on March 15, 2022. He began work on campus May 1. From 2019-21, Johnson served as senior deputy athletic director at the University of Nebraska. From 2004-2019 he was the senior associate director of athletics for Washington State University. His career has also included being director of athletics at Weber State University (1997-2004) and Eastern Washington University (1993-97).

Home games for football and soccer are held at Hillsboro Stadium, and home games for basketball are held on-campus at the Peter W. Stott Center.

== Sports sponsored ==
Big Sky Conference logo in Portland State's colors

Men's sports	Women's sports
Basketball	Basketball
Cross country	Cross country
Football	Golf
Tennis	Soccer
Track and field^{†}	Softball
	Tennis
	Track and field^{†}
	Volleyball
† – Track and field includes both indoor and outdoor.

=== Men's sports ===
==== Football ====
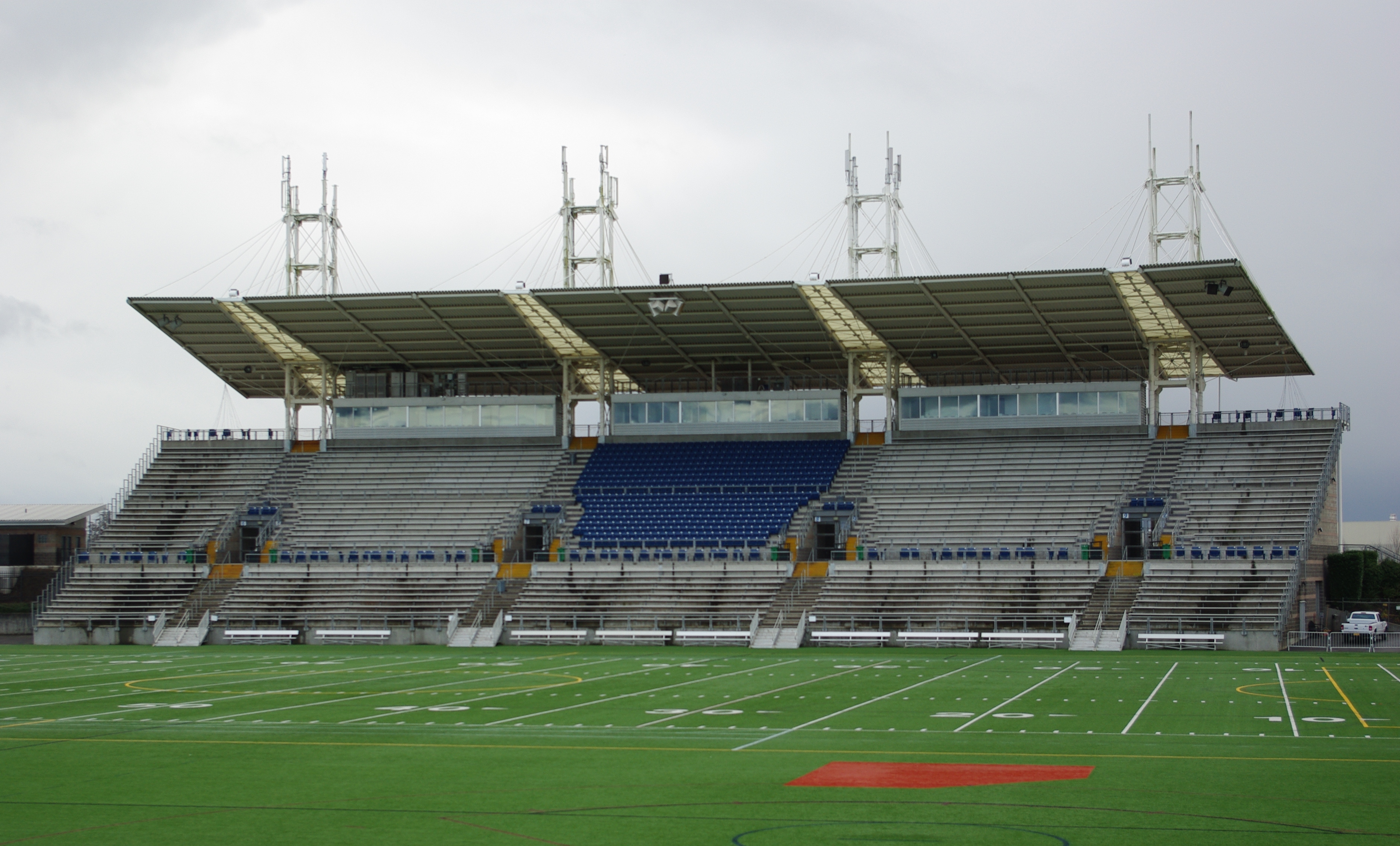
Hillsboro Stadium, home of Viking Football

Football began competing at the college level in 1947. PSU competed at the small college level before beginning to compete at an interstate level in the 1960s. The 1970s brokered a new level of achievement under Mouse Davis. Mouse Davis installed the "Run & Shoot" which provided prolific scoring teams led by quarterbacks June Jones and Neil Lomax. Later in the 1980s, highlights included 2nd-place finishes in NCAA Division II in 1989 and 1990 under legendary coach Pokey Allen.

The 2006 season included a victory over the University of New Mexico. The team finished the season tied for second in the conference and featured PSU offensive lineman Brennan Carvalho and linebacker Adam Hayword being named All-Americans. Tim Walsh completed his 14th year at the helm in 2006 and resigned to become the offensive coordinator at Army. Walsh was the longest tenured coach in PSU history. He was succeeded by Jerry Glanville, former NFL head coach and University of Hawaiʻi defensive coordinator. Glanville hired Mouse Davis as his new offensive coordinator who re-installed the Run & Shoot.

Jerry Glanville's initial season at PSU in 2007 was a disappointing 3–8 campaign. The team recorded a 1–4 home record, worst since 1973. However, enthusiasm was reflected with an increase in attendance and included a wild 73–68 loss to Weber State. Center Brennan Carvalho finished a brilliant career by being named All-American for a second time. On December 8, 2009, Portland State announced Nevada defensive coordinator Nigel Burton as their new head coach.

On September 15, 2015, The Vikings travelled to Pullman, Washington, to take on the Washington State Cougars. In Bruce Barnum's coaching debut. With a tie game at the nine-minute mark in the fourth quarter, Quarterback's Paris Penn, and Alex Kuresa put together a 14-play, 69-yard drive. Running Back Steven Long finished the series with a one-yard TD run at the 2:19 mark.

With the Vikings up, The Vikings' defensive unit was up to the task. Washington State was driving inside the final minute when senior DB Aaron Sibley picked off a Peyton Bender pass at the PSU 27-yard line. From there, PSU knelt on the ball and ran out the clock on one of the biggest wins in program history.

The Vikings knocked off the Pac-12 member Washington State 24-17. It marked the first time a Portland State team has ever beaten a Pac-12 opponent in 15 tries, and only the third time in program history that PSU has beaten an FBS-level opponent. The Vikings would finish the year 9-3 and make it into the FCS playoffs and host Northern Iowa at Providence Park. The Vikings season came to an end as they lost 29-17.

After not playing an official 2020 season due to the COVID-19 Pandemic, The Vikings played one spring football game in Missoula, Montana, against University Of Montana on April 17, at Washington-Grizzly Stadium. They returned for a full-season schedule in 2021. The Vikings finished the 2021 season at 5-6, including an upset victory in Ogden, UT over #24 Weber State. Quarterback Davis Alexander signed a free agent contract after season's end with the Montreal Alouettes of the Canadian Football League. Alexander completed his career ranked second all-time on PSU's passing lists (9,215 passing yards, 63 touchdowns, as well as 1,254 rushing yards, 25 TDs). Punter Seth Vernon also signed professionally with the Atlanta Falcons in the pre-season. He punted three times for a total of 134 yards, averaging 44.7 yards per punt, and had two punts inside the 20.

==== Head football coaches ====
See List of Portland State Vikings head football coaches

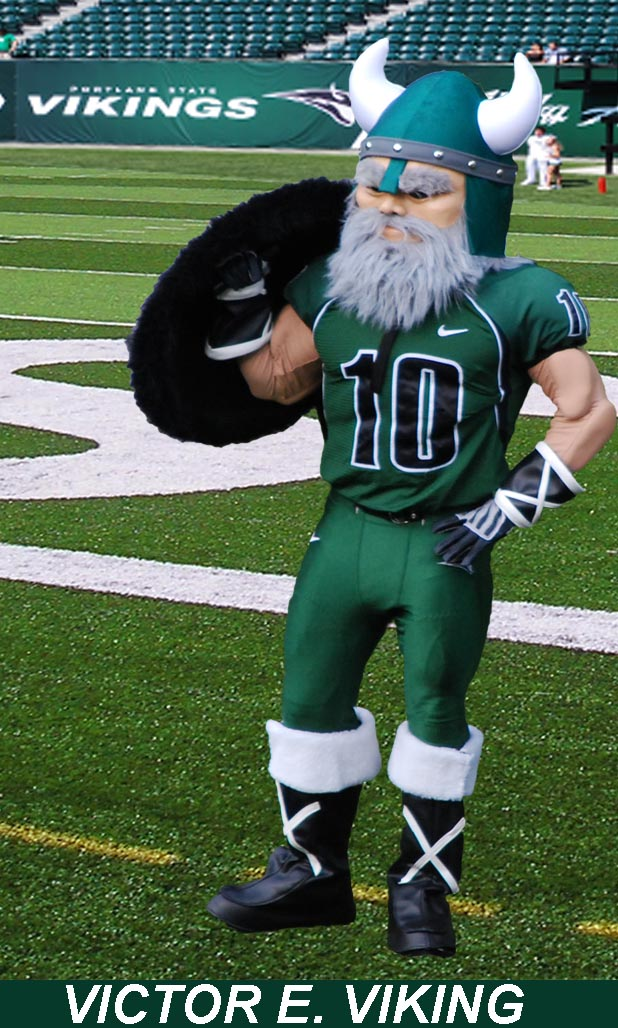
Portland State Mascot Victor E. Viking

Tenure	Coach	Years	Record	Pct.
1947–1954	Joe Holland	8	20–42–3	.331
1955–1956	Ralph Davis	2	4–11–1	.281
1957–1958	Les Leggatt	2	6–11–0	.353
1959–1961	Hugh Smithwick	3	6–17–2	.280
1962–1962	Tom DeSylvia	1	4–4–0	.500
1963–1967	Jerry Lyons	5	21–24–1	.467
1968–1971	Don Read*	4	20–19	.513
1972–1974	Ron Stratten	3	9–24–0	.273
1975–1980	Mouse Davis	6	42–24–0	.636
1981–1985	Don Read*	5	19–33–1	.365
1986–1992	Pokey Allen	7	63–26–2	.703
1993–2006	Tim Walsh	14	90–68–0	.570
2007–2009	Jerry Glanville	3	9–24–0	.273
2010–2014	Nigel Burton	5	12–21–0	.364
2015 – present	Bruce Barnum	7	26–42–0	.382
Totals	13 coaches	64 seasons	324–349–10	.482
* Read's combined statistics: 9 seasons, with a record of 39–52–1 (.429).

==== Basketball ====
National scoring champion Freeman Williams starred for PSU during the 1970s under coach Ken Edwards. PSU made the NCAA College Division playoffs in 1967, and twice competed in the NAIA playoffs in the 1950s.

In the Big Sky Conference: When PSU joined the Big Sky Conference, basketball returned to campus after a hiatus that lasted from 1981 to 1996. Former head coach is Tyler Geving. Portland State has qualified for the Big Sky Conference Tournament eight times in the eleven years it has been eligible. The Vikings have a 6–6 Big Sky Tournament record, including 2–0 against Montana State, 2–0 against Idaho State, 1–1 against Eastern Washington, and 1–2 against Northern Arizona and 0–3 against Weber State.

PSU completed the 2006–07 season with a 19–13 overall record and a 9–7 conference record. In the conference tournament, PSU defeated Montana State and was then defeated by Weber State to finish the season.

PSU rolled through the Big Sky in 2007–08, losing only two conference games on the way to a second ever conference championship since last winning in 2005. The Vikings went on to win the conference tourney by beating Idaho State in a semi-final match and Northern Arizona University in the final to secure the school's first NCAA Men's Basketball National Championship Tournament berth. The Vikings (23–9) were selected as a No. 16 seed in the 2008 NCAA tournament in the Midwest Region, losing to No. 1 Kansas 85–61.

In the 2008–09, for the second year in a row, the Portland State Vikings completed a 23–10 basketball season with a trip to the NCAA Tournament. Matched with the previous season, the two 23-win seasons tie for the most in school history. And, both seasons culminated with appearances in the NCAA Tournament. Although the Vikings did not win the Big Sky Conference regular season title (as they did in 2007–08), the second-place team did win the Big Sky Tournament for a second straight season, advancing to the NCAA Tournament. Portland State earned a number-13 seed but lost in the Tournament to fourth-seeded Xavier in a first-round game, 77–59. The regular season highlights included a victory on the road over then seventh ranked Gonzaga and a victory over Boise State in an ESPN "bracket-buster" game.

After Ken Bone left Portland State in 2009 for Washington State, Portland State hired Tyler Gerving as head coach. Gerving coached the Vikings from 2009 to 2017. In 2017, Barrett Peery was hired as head coach. In 2017, Barrett Peery was hired as head coach of The Vikings. To start the season, Peery lead The Vikings to a 5–0 record with wins over Utah State, University Of Portland, and UC Riverside heading into the Phil Knight 80 Invitational. In the first game of the PK80, The Vikings drew Duke. Who had future lottery draft picks and NBA players Marvin Bagley III, Wendell Carter Jr., Gary Trent Jr., and Grayson Allen. The Vikings led at halftime 49-45 in part from 20 points from guard Deontae North. Duke shot 51% from the field in the second half and ended up winning 99-81. In the next game, The Vikings lost 71-69 to Butler. In the final seconds, guard Bryce Canda had an opportunity to tie or take the lead but did not convert the chance.

===== Head basketball coaches =====
Tenure	Coach	Years	Record	Pct.
1946–1947	John Jenkins	1	11–10	.524
1947–1948	Joe Holland	1	14–5	.737
1948–1953	Arba Ager	5	85–52	.620
1953–1965	Sharkey Nelson	12	162–156	.509
1965–1972	Marion Pericin	7	85–82	.509
1972–1978	Ken Edwards	6	93–109	.592
1978–1981	Glen Kinney	3	18–62	.225
1996–1998	Ritchie McKay	2	24–29	.453
1998–2002	Joel Sobotka	4	53–59	.452
2003–2005	Heath Schroyer^{1}	3	35–47	.427
2005–2009	Ken Bone^{2}	4	77–49	.611
2009 – 2017	Tyler Geving	2	112-133	.457
2017-2020	Barrett Peery	3	63-57	.525
2021-Present	Jase Coburn	3	43-51	.457
Totals	12 coaches	48 seasons	670–634	.514

Notes

- ^{1} – Big Sky Conference 2005 Regular Season Champion.
- ^{2} – Big Sky Conference '08 Regular Season Champs. 2008 & '09 Tourney Champs. 2008 & '09 NCAA Tournament bids.

==== Track & Field ====
The men and women's track & field teams are led by head coach David Hepburn. The assistant coach is Portland native, Josh Seitz.

==== Tennis ====
Head Coach Brian Parrott leads the Vikings' tennis program starting with the 2008–09 season. After his collegiate career, Parrott played professionally for several years. He played in the U.S. Open qualifier in 1973, and was a member of the Sea-Port Cascades of the World Team Tennis league in 1977. Between 1967 and 1980, Parrott was ranked No. 1 in doubles seven times in the Pacific Northwest, and was never ranked lower than No. 8 in singles. But recently Parrott resigned from his coaching position, and is now taken over by assistant coach Jay Starling.

=== Women's sports ===
==== Basketball ====
The women's basketball tradition includes considerable success at the NCAA DII level playing for national championships prior to moving to Division I. Head Sherri Murrell, formerly the head coach of Washington State, was hired July 1, 2007, to lead the program into its second decade in the Big Sky. Murrell was preceded by Coach Charity Elliot who resigned at the end of the 2006–07 season to become the head coach at University of California, San Diego.

Under first-year head coach Sherri Murrell, the 2007–08 Portland State team finished 22–9 overall and advanced to the semifinals of the Big Sky Conference Tournament. Portland State finished 11–5 in the Big Sky, tying with Montana State for third place, to post its first winning conference mark since going 8–6 in 2002–03. The Vikings were impressive in their conference victories, posting an average margin of victory of 16.7 points. The 22 wins marked the Vikings’ first 20-win season as a Division I program, and their first since going 25–5 as a member of Division II in 1995–96.

In 2008–09 under Murrell's guidance, Portland State posted an impressive 14–2 conference record in the Big Sky Conference losing only to Montana State at home and Montana on the road. PSU finished second behind Montana and beat Idaho State in the conference semi-finals and then lost to Montana in the tournament final.

==== Volleyball ====
Longtime coach Jeff Mozzochi led the Vikings to it most successful DI finish in 2006 since moving up from DII. With a .750 winning percentage (21–7, 14–2), the best in the school's Division I era, PSU finished second in the conference's final standings for the second straight year. In the off-season, Mozzochi relinquished the head coaching reins of the program to assistant Michael Seemann and Mozzochi moved into an associate head coaching position.

Under Seemann, the Vikings ended the 2007 season with a 21–8 record and Portland State's first ever Big Sky Regular Championship but missed the NCAA tournament by losing in the conference tournament.

Portland State returned most of its 2007 roster for the 2008 season and finished tied for second in the conference standings. The Vikings hosted and won the 2008 Big Sky Championship tournament at the Peter W. Stott Center for a first ever trip to the NCAA DI tournament.

One of the highlights of Mozzochi's run at PSU came during the 1992 season when the Vikings ran off one of the best NCAA Division II seasons in history. The Vikings lost their ninth match of the year to Cal State-Bakersfield and would not lose again, winning their last 28 straight (31 including foreign teams) matches. Portland State swept through the first three rounds of the NCAA DII Tournament and then defeated Northern Michigan in five games in front of a sellout crowd at the Stott Center for national title number four.

In 2021 Vikings Volleyball went 20-11. In the season The Vikings had their first national postseason berth since 2010 including the first victory in a national postseason tournament in Division I program history (3-2 over Pacific in the first round of the National Invitational Volleyball Championship). The most wins since 2017 (20). Best conference record since 2013 (12-4) and the longest winning streak since 2013 (seven matches from September 25 to October 16).

==== Soccer ====
A new era in Portland State women's soccer began on February 22, 2008, when former All-American and professional player Laura Schott was named the Vikings’ new head coach. Schott is the seventh head coach in program history. The soccer team won the Big Sky Conference Championship in 2004 under then coach Tara Erickson who subsequently was hired by the University of Oregon.

==== Golf ====
The Viking program has been in existence since 1996, but has already proven to be competitive at a high level under former Portland State golf coach Felicia Johnston's guidance. Johnston led the Vikings to three Big Sky Conference Championships during her tenure (2003, 2004, 2005).

After seven seasons in charge, Portland State women's golf coach Felicia Johnston announced her resignation, citing a desire to spend more time with her family. Johnston and her husband, Shane, had a son, Connor, summer of 2007.

“I have been a head coach for 10 years (seven at PSU, three at Northern Arizona),” said Johnston. “Traveling and (coaching and parenting) was tough. Something was going to suffer. So, if I couldn’t do it 100%, I had to choose my family. I’ve been lucky to help this program grow, and I thank everyone for the support they have given me.”

Kathleen Takaishi was named the new women's golf coach on February 4 and took over the program immediately in preparation for the 2008 spring season.

==== Softball ====
The Viking softball team has appeared in one Women's College World Series, in 1978. Tobin Echo-Hawk has been coach since the 2008–09 season and is just the third head softball coach at PSU since 1977. The team's record for her first two years is 59–33. They were 27–16 with three games left (as of 5/3 2011) in the 2010–11 season. Prior to joining the Vikings staff she was the head coach at Broomfield High School in Colorado in 2006. She also spent three years coaching at her alma mater in Colorado, Centaurus High School, and guided the team to a record of 60–15 from 2000–02. Overall as a high school head coach, she compiled a four-year record of 97–26, produced seven all-state performers, and was twice named the league coach of the year.

The Vikings left the Pacific Coast Softball Conference after the 2012 season. With the Big Sky Conference adding two new members in 2012, both of which sponsor softball, that conference had enough softball-playing members to receive an automatic berth in the NCAA softball tournament. Accordingly, the Big Sky added softball as an official conference sport starting in the 2013 season.

==== Track and field ====
The men and women's track and field teams are led by interim head coach Ronnye Harrison. The assistant track and field coaches are John Parks and Seth Henson.

==== Tennis ====
Head coach Brian Parrott leads the Vikings' tennis program starting with the 2008–09 season. After his collegiate career, Parrott played professionally for several years. He played in the U.S. Open qualifier in 1973, and was a member of the Sea-Port Cascades of the World Team Tennis league in 1977. Between 1967 and 1980, Parrott was ranked No. 1 in doubles seven times in the Pacific Northwest, and was never ranked lower than No. 8 in singles.

== National championships ==
The Vikings have won seven team NCAA national championships, all at the Division II level.

=== Team ===
Association	Division	Sport	Year	Opponent/Runner-up	Score
NCAA (7)	Division II (7)	Women's volleyball (4)	1984	Cal State Northridge	3–0
NCAA (7)	Division II (7)	Women's volleyball (4)	1985	Cal State Northridge	3–1
NCAA (7)	Division II (7)	Women's volleyball (4)	1988	Cal State Northridge	3–0
NCAA (7)	Division II (7)	Women's volleyball (4)	1992	Northern Michigan	3–2
NCAA (7)	Division II (7)	Wrestling (3)	1967	Mankato State	86–57 (+29)
NCAA (7)	Division II (7)	Wrestling (3)	1989	Ferris State	102.5–56.25 (+45.75)
NCAA (7)	Division II (7)	Wrestling (3)	1990	Central State (OK)	100.75–96 (+4.75)

== Former sports ==
=== Baseball ===
The school's baseball NCAA team started in 1965, and remained until following the 1998 season, playing home games at then Civic Stadium (now Providence Park). The program had competed at the NAIA level previously, and played in that division's championship game in 1962 before becoming an NCAA independent. Alumni of the team include Tom Trebelhorn, Gordon Riese, and Steve Olin. In 1982 they joined the Pac-10 (now Pac-12) conference as an affiliate member, and remained until the team was discontinued. The team had three managers in program history, Roy Love from 1965 through 1974, Jack Dunn from 1975 to 1994, and Dave Dangler for the final four seasons. PSU made it to the playoffs one time, in 1977, playing in the Tempe regional.

=== Wrestling ===
PSU's wrestling program has won NCAA Division II Championships in 1967, 1989 and 1990. Rick Sanders was the first Viking to win individual national championships and was a two-time Olympic silver medalist. Portland State eliminated its wrestling program in 2009 due to state budget issues attributed to the worst recessions to hit the US since the great depression. The programs final head coach was 1987 alum Mike Haluska. The team was an affiliate member of the Pac-10 (later Pac-12) conference at the time of disbandment.
