= Rex Hunsaker =

American football coach (1903–1994)

- Hunsaker, c. 1962

Biographical details
- Born: February 13, 1909; Honeyville, Utah, U.S.
- Died: March 20, 1994 (aged 85); Pleasanton, California, U.S.

Coaching career (HC unless noted)

Football
- 1945–1949: Albany HS (OR)
- 1950–1961: Oregon Tech

Golf
- 1960–1962: Oregon Tech

Administrative career (AD unless noted)
- 1953–1962: Oregon Tech

Head coaching record
- Overall: 60–44–6 (college football)

Accomplishments and honors

Championships
- Football; 3 OCC (1954, 1959–1960)

Rex Jesse Hunsaker (December 13, 1909 – March 20, 1994) was an American football coach and athletic administrator. He was the head football coach at Oregon Institute of Technology from 1950 to 1951 and the school's athletic director from 1953 to 1962. He also held multiple high school coaching positions in Utah, Idaho, and Oregon.

== Early years ==
Hunsaker was born in Honeyville, Utah, in 1909. He attended Utah State University where he earned varsity letters in football and basketball. He graduated from Utah State in 1936. He then attended graduate school at the University of Idaho.

== Coaching career ==
Hunsaker began his career as a high school basketball and football coach in Utah and Idaho. He held positions in southern Utah, Inkom, Idaho, and Downey, Idaho. He then coached at Buhl High School in Buhl, Idaho, and Rupert High School in Rupert, Idaho.

After World War II, Hunsaker coached at Albany High School in Albany, Oregon. He served as athletic director, football coach, and baseball coach at Albany. He was Albany's head football coach from 1945 to 1949, compiling a 27–13–8 record, including a 9–1 record in 1948.

Hunsaker was hired in April 1950 as head football coach at Oregon Institute of Technology (Oregon Tech) in Klamath Falls, Oregon. He led the Oregon Tech football team from 1950 to 1961, compiling a record of 60–44–6 and leading the 1960 team to an undefeated season. He also served as the athletic director at Oregon Tech from 1953 to 1962. Prior to his hiring, Oregon Tech had never won a championship in any sport. During his tenure as athletic director, Oregon Tech won a championship in every major sport except baseball.

== Family and later years ==
Hunsaker married Viola Hammond in 1939 in Logan, Utah.

In May 1962, Hunsaker resigned his post at Oregon Tech to become principal at Lakeview High School in Lakeview, Oregon.

Hunsaker died in 1994 in Pleasanton, California. He was buried at Lincoln Memorial Park in Portland, Oregon.

== Head coaching record ==
=== College football ===
Year	Team	Overall	Conference	Standing	Bowl/playoffs
Oregon Tech Hustlin' Owls (Oregon Collegiate Conference) (1950–1961)
1950	Oregon Tech	2–7–1	1–1–1	2nd	
1951	Oregon Tech	6–3	2–1	2nd	
1952	Oregon Tech	7–3	2–1	2nd	
1953	Oregon Tech	2–5–1	1–2	3rd	
1954	Oregon Tech	6–4	3–1	T–1st	
1955	Oregon Tech	0–8	0–4	5th	
1956	Oregon Tech	4–4–1	1–3	T–4th	
1957	Oregon Tech	6–4	2–2	2nd	
1958	Oregon Tech	2–6 (Note: Oregon Tech finished the 1958 season with an overall record of 5–3 and a mark of 3–1 in conference play, but forfeited three conference wins—over Eastern Oregon, Oregon College, and Portland State—due to ineligible players.)	0–4	5th	
1959	Oregon Tech	6–2	4–0	1st	
1960	Oregon Tech	9–0	4–0	1st	
1961	Oregon Tech	4–4–1	1–2–1	4th	
Oregon Tech:		54–50–4	21–21–2		
Total:		54–50–4			
National championship Conference title Conference division title or championship game berth
