= 1960 Oregon Tech Owls football team =

American college football season

1960 Oregon Tech Owls football
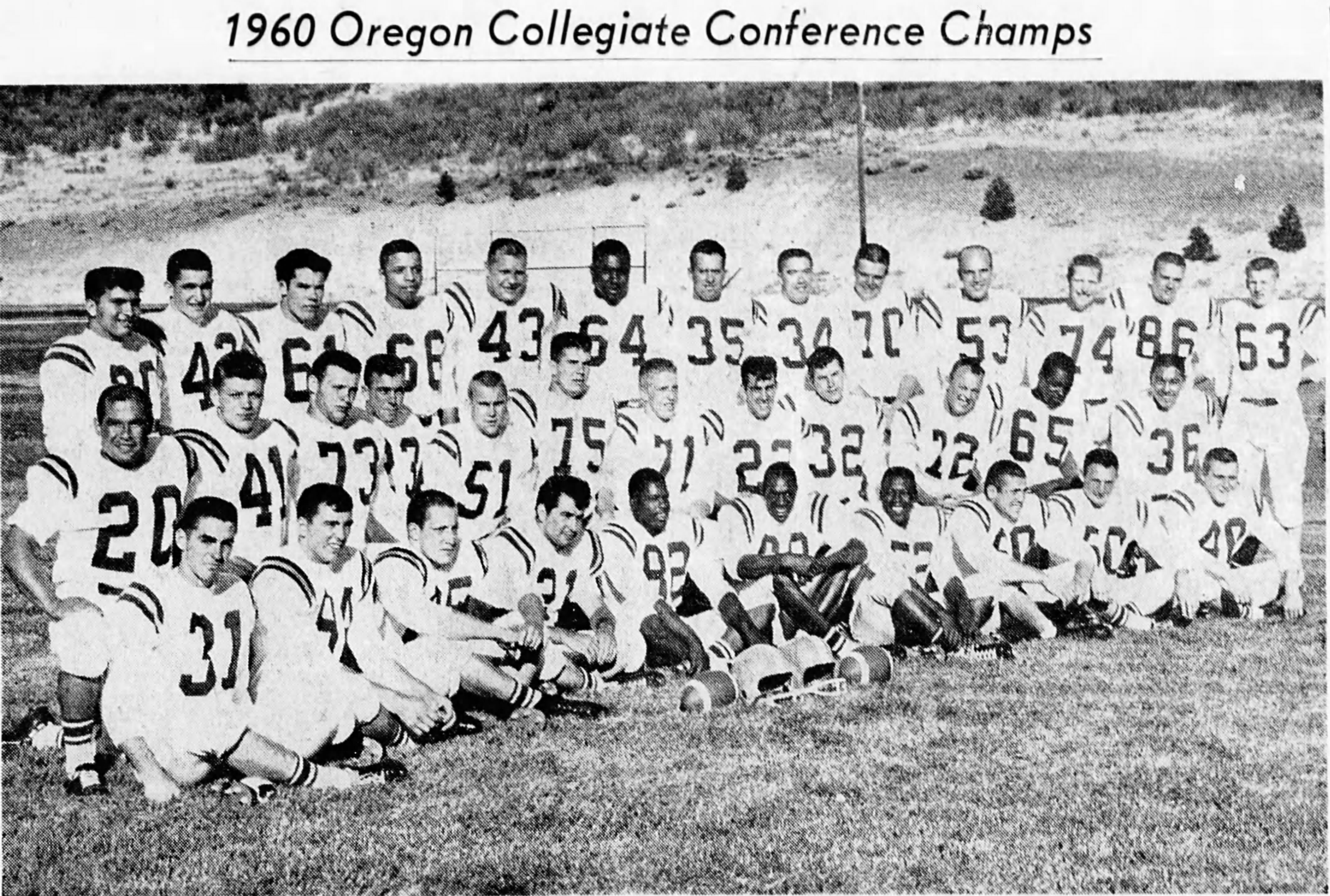

OCC champion
- Conference: Oregon Collegiate Conference
- Record: 9–0 (4–0 OCC)
- Head coach: Rex Hunsaker (11th season)
- Home stadium: Modoc Field

1960 Oregon Collegiate Conference football standings
	Conf.					Overall
Team	W		L		T	W		L		T
Oregon Tech $	4	–	0	–	0	9	–	0	–	0
Southern Oregon	3	–	1	–	0	5	–	4	–	0
Portland State	1	–	2	–	1	2	–	4	–	2
Oregon College	1	–	3	–	0	3	–	5	–	0
Eastern Oregon	0	–	3	–	1	0	–	7	–	2
$ – Conference champion

The 1960 Oregon Tech Owls football team was an American football team that represented the Oregon Technical Institute (now known as Oregon Institute of Technology) as a member of the Oregon Collegiate Conference (NCC) during the 1960 NAIA football season. In their 11th year under head coach Rex Hunsaker, the Owls compiled a 9–0 record (4–0 against conference opponents), won the OCC championship, and outscored opponents by a total of 233 to 117. It was the first perfect season in Oregon Tech football history.

Six Oregon Tech players received first-team honors on the 1960 All-OCC football team: quarterback Roy Johnson, halfback Ardell Hamilton; end Dennis Farster; offensive guard Andy Cook; defensive tackle Jim Madden; and defensive back Charlie Wilson.

== Schedule ==
Date	Opponent	Site	Result	Source
September 17	at Westminster (UT)*	Salt Lake City, UT	W 22–19	
September 24	El Camino*	Modoc Field; Klamath Falls, OR	W 19–6	
October 1	Portland State	Modoc Field; Klamath Falls OR	W 19–14	
October 8	at Eastern Oregon	La Grande, OR	W 52–6	
October 15	Southern Oregon	Modoc Field; Klamath Falls, OR	W 21–19	
October 22	La Verne*	Modoc Field; Klamath Falls, OR	W 35–14	
October 29	at Oregon College	Monmouth, OR	W 26–13	
November 5	Whitman*	Modoc Field; Klamath Falls, OR	W 14–7	
November 12	at Grays Harbor*	Aberdeen, WA	W 26–19	
*Non-conference game
