= Joe Holland =

Joseph or Joe Holland may refer to:

- Joe Holland (American football) (born 1988), American football player
- Joe Holland (skier) (born 1964), American Nordic combined skier
- Joe Holland (coach) (1916–1992), American football, basketball, and baseball coach in the United States
- Joe Holland (baseball), American football and baseball player for the Clemson Tigers; minor league baseball player, baseball coach
- Joe Holland (basketball) (1926–2010), American basketball player
- Joe Holland (footballer) (born 1993), English footballer
- Joseph H. Holland, American politician and businessman from New York
- Joseph R. Holland (born 1936), American politician from New York
- Joseph Holland (actor) (1919–1994), stage and screen actor who was a founding member of the Mercury Theatre
- Joseph Holland (1859–1926), stage and silent screen actor, brother of Edmund Milton Holland
- John Charles Francis Holland (1897–1956), known as Jo, British Army intelligence and engineering officer
