= Al Akins =

American football player (1921–1995)

No. 80, 81, 90
- Positions: Halfback, defensive back

Personal information
- Born: June 13, 1921; Spokane, Washington, U.S.
- Died: August 29, 1995 (aged 74); Reno, Nevada, U.S.
- Listed height: 6 ft 1 in (1.85 m)
- Listed weight: 199 lb (90 kg)

Career information
- High school: John R. Rogers (Spokane)
- College: Washington State (1941-1942); Washington (1943)
- NFL draft: 1944: 6th round, 53rd overall pick

Career history

Playing
- Cleveland Browns (1946); Brooklyn Dodgers (1947); Buffalo Bills (1948); Brooklyn Dodgers (1948)

Coaching
- Lewis & Clark College (1950–1954) Assistant coach; Southern Oregon (1955–1969) Head coach

Awards and highlights
- AAFC champion (1946)

Career AAFC statistics
- Rushing yards: 112
- Rushing average: 4.7
- Receptions: 9
- Receiving yards: 113
- Total touchdowns: 3
- Stats at Pro Football Reference

Albert George Akins (June 13, 1921 – August 29, 1995) was an American professional football halfback and defensive back who played three seasons for the Cleveland Browns, Buffalo Bills and Brooklyn Dodgers in the All-America Football Conference (AAFC).

Akins was a native of Spokane, Washington and attended Washington State University and later the University of Washington, where he played football and basketball. He was a key member of a University of Washington team that lost the Rose Bowl Game in 1943 to the University of Southern California. Akins played for the Browns in 1946, and subsequently joined Buffalo and Brooklyn. He won an AAFC championship with the Browns, although he did not play in the championship game due to an injury.

After his playing career, Akins became an assistant football coach at Lewis & Clark College in Portland, Oregon. He went on to become head coach of Southern Oregon University for 15 years starting in 1955. His coaching record at Southern Oregon was 71–62–3.

== Early life ==
Akins grew up in Spokane, Washington and attended John R. Rogers High School, where he played on the basketball team and ran track. His brothers Frank and Hal were also standouts as athletes.

== College career ==
Akins lettered in basketball at Washington State College in 1940 and 1941, but did not play football. By the end of 1943, Akins had transferred to the University of Washington, where many Washington State players went to train in the U.S. Navy. He played football there, starring as a halfback for the Washington Huskies. He was also said to be a good passer. The 1943 team went undefeated and was heavily favored to beat the University of Southern California in the 1944 Rose Bowl. The USC Trojans won 29–0, however. Akins fumbled the ball in the third quarter, setting up one of the Trojans' touchdowns. Jim Hardy, the USC quarterback, said after the game that the team's "only real fear was that that fellow Al Akins might get loose on the runback of a punt for a touchdown."

Akins also played basketball at the University of Washington in 1944, when he was a first-team All-PCC selection. That year, the Huskies basketball team won 20 games in a row and finished first in their conference.

== Professional career ==
Although drafted by the Cleveland Rams in the sixth round of the 1944 NFL draft, by the time Akins returned from military duty in the Pacific, the team had pulled up stakes and moved to Los Angeles. Akins instead opted to play in 1946 with the new Cleveland franchise that was part of the rival All-America Football Conference (AAFC), the Browns.

Akins scored his only touchdown of the season on a 50-yard run in a game against the Buffalo Bisons. Cleveland defeated the AAFC's New York Yankees to win the league title that year. Akins did not play in the title game because of an injury, however, having suffered a separated shoulder in a game against the Miami Seahawks.

Akins played a full season in 1947 for the AAFC's Brooklyn Dodgers, seeing action in 13 games with 3 starts and scoring one touchdown. He started the 1948 season with the Dodgers but was shipped to the Buffalo Bills after having played just three games. He saw action in just one game for the Bills, getting the start, but was again injured and missed the rest of the season — including the 1948 AAFC Championship Game, which the Bills lost to the Browns.

As the 1949 season approached, Akins remained on the Bills training camp roster but he was cut by the team ahead of the season, ending his professional football playing career.

== Coaching career ==
Akins took a job as an assistant football coach at Lewis & Clark College in Portland, Oregon. He resigned in 1954 to seek a head coaching job, and got the top spot the following year at Southern Oregon University in Ashland, Oregon. He stayed in that job for 15 seasons until 1969. His teams' combined record was 71–62–3 during that span. He is first all-time among coaches at Southern Oregon in total wins and fifth in career winning percentage (.533).

== Head coaching record ==
Year	Team	Overall	Conference	Standing	Bowl/playoffs
Southern Oregon Red Raiders (Oregon Collegiate Conference) (1955–1969)
1955	Southern Oregon	4–5	3–1	T–1st	
1956	Southern Oregon	3–6	2–2	T–2nd	
1957	Southern Oregon	6–2–1	3–0–1	1st	
1958	Southern Oregon	5–5	3–1	2nd	
1959	Southern Oregon	4–5	3–1	2nd	
1960	Southern Oregon	5–4	3–1	2nd	
1961	Southern Oregon	5–4	4–0	1st	
1962	Southern Oregon	8–1	4–0	1st	
1963	Southern Oregon	5–4	3–1	2nd	
1964	Southern Oregon	6–2–1	3–0–1	T–1st	
1965	Southern Oregon	5–3–1	4–0	1st	
1966	Southern Oregon	4–4	3–1	2nd	
1967	Southern Oregon	5–4	3–1	T–1st	
1968	Southern Oregon	4–6	3–1	2nd	
1969	Southern Oregon	2–7	1–3	T–2nd	
Southern Oregon:		71–62–3	45–13–2		
Total:		71–62–3			
National championship Conference title Conference division title or championship game berth
