= Hugh Smithwick =

American football player and coach (1918–1990)

Biographical details
- Born: July 6, 1918; Erick, Oklahoma, U.S.
- Died: December 4, 1990 (aged 72); Portland, Oregon, U.S.

Playing career
- 1939, 1941–1942: Nevada
- Position: Tackle

Coaching career (HC unless noted)
- 1940s–1950s: Nevada (assistant)
- 1959–1961: Portland State

Head coaching record
- Overall: 6–17–2

Hugh Smithwick (July 6, 1918 – December 4, 1990) was an American football player and coach. He was the head college football coach for the Portland State Vikings located in Portland, Oregon. He held that position for three seasons, from 1959 until 1961. His coaching record at Portland State was 6–17–2.

== Head coaching record ==
Year	Team	Overall	Conference	Standing	Bowl/playoffs
Portland State Vikings (Oregon Collegiate Conference) (1959–1961)
1959	Portland State	1–8	1–3	4th	
1960	Portland State	2–4–2	1–2–1	3rd	
1961	Portland State	3–5	2–2	3rd	
Portland State:		6–17–2	4–7–1		
Total:		6–17–2			
