= Cornell Burbage =

American football player and coach (born 1965)

No. 15, 82, 89
- Position: Wide receiver

Personal information
- Born: February 22, 1965 (age 61); Lexington, Kentucky, U.S.
- Listed height: 5 ft 10 in (1.78 m)
- Listed weight: 186 lb (84 kg)

Career information
- High school: Bryan Station (Lexington)
- College: Kentucky
- NFL draft: 1987: undrafted

Career history

Playing
- Dallas Cowboys (1987–1989); Minnesota Vikings (1990)*; Pittsburgh Steelers (1991)*; New York/New Jersey Knights (1991–1992); Hamilton Tiger-Cats (1993)*; Memphis Mad Dogs (1995)*
- * Offseason or practice squad member only

Coaching
- Kentucky State (2004) Interim head coach

Career NFL statistics
- Receptions: 26
- Receiving yards: 352
- Touchdowns: 2
- Stats at Pro Football Reference

Cornell Rodney Burbage (born February 22, 1965) is an American former professional football player who was a wide receiver in the National Football League (NFL) for the Dallas Cowboys. He also was a member of the New York/New Jersey Knights of the World League of American Football (WLAF). He played college football for the Kentucky Wildcats.

== Early life ==
Burbage attended Bryan Station High School, where he was a teammate of Dermontti Dawson and Marc Logan. He didn't have great stats at wide receiver because he played in a heavily run-oriented system. As a senior, he received All-state honors in football and track.

He accepted a football scholarship from the University of Kentucky, but had few opportunities to prove his true worth in the Wildcats run-oriented offense. As a junior, he tallied 25 receptions (second on the team) for 418 yards (led the team). Including 7 receptions for 131 yards against Mississippi State University.

In his last year in 1986, he led the team in receiving with only 24 receptions for 331 yards. He ranked third in the SEC in kickoff returns with a 23.1-yard average and fifth in punt returns with 6.7-yard average. He finished his college career with 64 receptions for 988 yards and no touchdowns.

== Professional career ==
=== Dallas Cowboys ===
Burbage was signed as an undrafted free agent by the Dallas Cowboys after the 1987 NFL draft. He was waived on September 7.

After the players went on a strike on the third week of the 1987 season, those games were canceled (reducing the 16-game season to 15) and the NFL decided that the games would be played with replacement players. Burbage was signed to be a part of the Dallas Cowboys replacement team, that was given the mock name "Rhinestone Cowboys" by the media. He had 3 receptions for 110 yards, including a 77-yard touchdown against the Philadelphia Eagles. He was cut on October 26, after the strike ended.

In 1988, he was signed during the offseason and was cut on August 29. Burbage was re-signed on October 12 to provide depth after the team suffered many injuries on the wide receiver corps. He finished the year ranked second in kickoff-return average (22.4 yards) in the National Football Conference.

On September 19, 1989, he was placed on the injured reserve list with a shoulder injury.

=== Minnesota Vikings ===
Burbage signed with the Minnesota Vikings as a Plan B free agent in 1990. He was released on August 28.

=== New York/New Jersey Knights (WLAF) ===
Burbage signed with the New York/New Jersey Knights of the World League of American Football in 1991, they were coached by Mouse Davis, the architect of the Run and shoot offense. He led the league in kickoff-return average and also registered a World League-record return of 101 yards in 1992.

=== Pittsburgh Steelers ===
On July 10, 1991, he was signed as a free agent by the Pittsburgh Steelers. He was cut on August 26.

=== Hamilton Tiger-Cats (CFL) ===
Burbage signed with the Hamilton Tiger-Cats of the Canadian Football League in 1993. He was waived on July 4.

=== Memphis Mad Dogs (CFL) ===
In 1995, he was signed as a free agent by the Memphis Mad Dogs of the Canadian Football League. He was released before the start of the season.

== Coaching career ==
After his playing career was over, Burbage was a coach at Paul Laurence Dunbar High School, where he helped turn the team into a state runner-up in 1997. The next year, he left to coach at his alma mater, Bryan Station High School.

Burbage served three years as the offensive coordinator, before taking over as the 27th head football coach at Kentucky State University on an interim basis for the 2004 season. His record at Kentucky State was 7–4.

In 2006, he was named the head coach at West Jessamine High School. Cornell is currently an assistant coach at his former high school, Bryan Station High School, in Lexington.

== Head coaching record ==
=== College ===
Year	Team	Overall	Conference	Standing	Bowl/playoffs
Kentucky State Thorobreds (Southern Intercollegiate Athletic Conference) (2004)
2004	Kentucky State	7–4	5–3	4th	
Kentucky State:		7–4	5–3		
Total:		7–4			
