= Archie Dunsmoor =

American football coach (1923–2007)

Biographical details
- Born: March 6, 1923; Portland, Oregon, U.S.
- Died: June 9, 2007 (aged 84); Eugene, Oregon, U.S.
- Education: Western Oregon

Coaching career (HC unless noted)

Football
- 1946–1954: Redmond HS (OR)
- 1955–1967: Eastern Oregon

Head coaching record
- Overall: 29–78–4 (college)

Accomplishments and honors

Championships
- 2 OCC (1955–1956)

Archie Clinton Dunsmoor (March 6, 1923 – June 9, 2007) was an American football coach. He served as the head football coach at Eastern Oregon University in La Grande, Oregon from 1955 to 1967, compiling a record of 29–78–4.

== Head coaching record ==
=== College ===
Year	Team	Overall	Conference	Standing	Bowl/playoffs
Eastern Oregon Mountaineers (Oregon Collegiate Conference) (1955–1969)
1955	Eastern Oregon	5–3	3–1	T–1st	
1956	Eastern Oregon	5–3	4–0	1st	
1957	Eastern Oregon	1–7–1	0–3–1	5th	
1958	Eastern Oregon	1–8	1–3	4th	
1959	Eastern Oregon	3–6	2–2	3rd	
1960	Eastern Oregon	0–7–2	0–3–1	5th	
1961	Eastern Oregon	1–7	0–4	5th	
1962	Eastern Oregon	1–8	0–4	5th	
1963	Eastern Oregon	1–8	0–4	5th	
1964	Eastern Oregon	3–4	1–3	4th	
1965	Eastern Oregon	3–6–1	2–2	T–2nd	
1966	Eastern Oregon	3–5	2–2	3rd	
1967	Eastern Oregon	2–6	2–2	3rd	
Eastern Oregon:		27–78–4	17–33–2		
Total:		29–78–4			
National championship Conference title Conference division title or championship game berth
