= William McArthur =

William McArthur may refer to:

- William Pope McArthur (1814–1850), US naval officer and hydrologist
- William McArthur (lord mayor of London) (1809–1887), Irish businessman, MP and Lord Mayor of London
- William Alexander McArthur (1857–1923), British politician
- William S. McArthur (born 1951), US astronaut
- Sir William MacArthur (British Army officer), Director General Army Medical Services
- Bill McArthur (American football), American football player and coach

== See also ==
- William Macarthur (1800–1882), Australian horticulturist and politician
