= Amos Jones =

American football player and coach (born 1959)

Alabama A&M Bulldogs
- Title: Special teams coordinator

Personal information
- Born: December 31, 1959 (age 66); Tallahassee, Florida, U.S.

Career information
- High school: Carrollton (AL) Pickens
- College: Alabama

Career history
- Alabama (1981–1982) Graduate assistant; Temple (1983–1985) Tight ends coach; Temple (1986–1988) Defensive line coach; Shades Valley HS (AL) (1989) Assistant coach; Alabama (1990–1991) Special teams coordinator; Pittsburgh (1992) Kicking game coach; Eau Gallie HS (FL) (1993–1994) Assistant coach; Tulane (1995–1996) Linebackers coach; BC Lions (1997) Assistant coach; East St. John HS (LA) (1998) Assistant coach; Cincinnati (1999–2002) Running backs coach & special teams coach; James Madison (2003) Tight ends coach & special teams coach; Mississippi State (2004–2005) Special teams coordinator & linebackers coach; Mississippi State (2006) Outside linebackers coach; Pittsburgh Steelers (2007–2011) Assistant special teams coach; Pittsburgh Steelers (2012) Special teams coordinator; Arizona Cardinals (2013–2017) Special teams coordinator; Cleveland Browns (2018) Special teams coordinator; Tampa Bay Buccaneers (2019) Assistant special teams coordinator; New York Giants (2020–2021) Special projects & situations; Alabama A&M (2025-present) Special teams coordinator

Awards and highlights
- As coach: Super Bowl champion (XLIII); As player: 2× NCAA national champion (1978, 1979)

Amos Jones (born December 31, 1959) is an American football coach who is currently the special teams coordinator for Alabama A&M. He has coached for over 40 years in college football and for several NFL teams as a special teams coordinator and position coach.

== College playing career ==
Jones played safety and running back at the University of Alabama, under Bear Bryant. He graduated from Alabama with his bachelor's degree in 1982, and later earned a master's degree from Alabama.

== Coaching career ==
Jones began his NFL coaching career as an assistant special teams coach for the Pittsburgh Steelers. He was hired on January 29, 2007. He worked under special teams coach Bob Ligashesky and head coach Mike Tomlin. He had previously worked with Tomlin as well as former Steelers offensive line coach Larry Zierlein in the late 1990s at the University of Cincinnati. Other connections with the Steelers staff included serving under (former) offensive coordinator Bruce Arians when he was head coach at Temple in the 1980s and playing and coaching at Alabama during the late 1970s and early 1980s when Steelers assistant head coach John Mitchell served at the Tide's defensive line coach.

Prior to joining the Steelers, Jones had coached football for 26 years—four seasons at the high school level; 21 seasons at the college level at Alabama, Temple, Pitt, Tulane, Cincinnati, James Madison, and Mississippi State; and a single year with the Canadian Football League's BC Lions.

Jones was retained by the Steelers as assistant special teams coach when Ligashesky was replaced by Al Everest as the Steelers' special teams coordinator in 2010. When Everest was fired by the team just prior to the 2012 season, Jones took over responsibility for all of the special teams. In 2013 Jones was hired by the Arizona Cardinals.

== Personal life ==
Jones grew up in Aliceville, Alabama. He is a 1978 graduate of Pickens Academy, a private school in Carrollton, Alabama. He was baptized in the Southern Baptist faith on the same day as his father.

Jones and his wife Stacey (formerly Stacey Merkle) have four children. Their oldest daughter and son attended the University of Alabama on the Bear Bryant Scholarship and graduated from the establishment in 2011 and 2015, respectively. The family makes their off-season home on a farm in Pickens County, Alabama, located between Aliceville and Carrollton.
