= New York/New Jersey Knights =

World League of American Football franchise

General information
- Founded: 1991
- Folded: 1992
- Headquartered: East Rutherford, New Jersey
- Colors: Black, Silver, Gold, White

League / conference affiliations
- World League of American Football (NFL Europe)

The New York/New Jersey Knights was a franchise in the World League of American Football for the 1991 and 1992 seasons. They played in the North American East division, which they won in the 1991 season. They were coached by Mouse Davis, an originator of the run and shoot offense.

After 1992, the NFL (who backed the league) suspended the WLAF's operations. When the WLAF returned in the 1995 season the league was concentrated in Europe, and none of the seven North American teams (including New York/New Jersey Knights) returned.

They played their home games at Giants Stadium, also the former home to the NFL's New York Giants and New York Jets.

== Season-by-season ==
Season	League	Regular season					Postseason			
Season	League	Won	Lost	Ties	Win %	Finish	Won	Lost	Win %	Result
1991	WLAF	5	5	0	.500	1st (North American East)	0	1	.000	Lost to London Monarchs in semifinal
1992	WLAF	6	4	0	.600	2nd (North American East)	–	–	—	—
Total		11	9	0	.550		0	1	.000	

== 1991 season ==
1991 New York/New Jersey Knights season
- Owner: Robert F. X. Sillerman
- General manager: Reggie Williams
- Head coach: Mouse Davis
- Home stadium: Giants Stadium

Results
- Record: 5–5
- Division place: 1st North American East
- Playoffs: Lost semifinal

== Staff ==
1991 New York/New Jersey Knights staff
Front office: Owner – Robert F. X. Sillerman; General Manager – Reggie Williams; Head coaches: Head Coach – Mouse Davis; Assistant Head Coach – Tim Marcum; Offensive coaches: Co-Offensive Coordinator – Darrel "Pop" Jackson; Co-Offensive Coordinator/Offensive Line – Larry Zierlein; Receivers/Special Teams – Dan Lounsbury	Defensive coaches: Defensive Coordinator – Joe Haering; Defensive Assistant – Will Lewis; Strength and conditioning: Strength and Conditioning – Rob Panariello

== Roster ==
1991 New York/New Jersey Knights final roster
Quarterbacks: 16 John Evans; 9 Jeff Graham; 5 Todd Hammel; Running backs: 27 Tony Jeffery; 40 Eric Wilkerson; Wide receivers: 80 Andre Alexander; 82 Cornell Burbage; 81 Monty Gilbreath; 84 Anthony Hardy; 88 Kip Lewis; 83 Charles Lockett; 86 Lonnie Turner; Tight ends: Vacant	Offensive linemen: 57 Alan Champagne C; 54 Rod Holder G; 74 Mike Husar G; 71 Caesar Rentie T; 51 Pete Scott C; 60 Stacy Searels G; 64 Kevin Simons T; 76 Jim Warne G; Defensive linemen: 94 Pat Marlatt DT; 69 Doug Mikolas DT; 92 Craig Schlichting DE; 91 Tony Woods DE	Linebackers: 99 Joe Campbell OLB; 56 Fabray Collins OLB; 98 Dave Edeen MLB; 58 Cecil Fletcher OLB; 53 Chris Haering MLB; 52 Ron Sancho OLB; Defensive backs: 20 Reggie Berry CB; 21 Vince Courville CB; 29 Ellis Dillahunt SS; 26 James Howard CB; 22 Tony Jones CB; 25 Mark Moore SS; 49 Falanda Newton FS; 31 Anthony Parker CB; 23 Derrick White CB; Special teams: 7 Barry Belli K/P; 4 Bobby Lilljedahl P; 7 Kendall Trainor K	Operation Discovery: 72 (Belgium) Danny Beun C; 77 (England) Les Jackson DE/DT; 28 (England) Mike Taylor S; 41 (Belgium) Eric Yuma RB; Rookies in italics

== Schedule/Results ==
Week	Date	Opponent	Result	Record	Venue	Attendance	Source
1	March 24	at Barcelona Dragons	L 7–19	0–1	Montjuic Stadium	19,223	
2	March 31	at London Monarchs	L 18–22	0–2	Wembley Stadium	46,952	
3	April 6	Frankfurt Galaxy	L 17–27	0–3	Giants Stadium	36,549	
4	April 13	at Montreal Machine	W 44–0	1–3	Olympic Stadium	34,821	
5	April 22	Sacramento Surge	W 28–20	2–3	Giants Stadium	21,230	
6	April 27	Orlando Thunder	W 42–6	3–3	Giants Stadium	30,046	
7	May 5	at Raleigh–Durham Skyhawks	W 42–6	4–3	Carter–Finley Stadium	10,069	
8	May 11	London Monarchs	L 7–22	4–4	Giants Stadium	41,219	
9	May 20	at Birmingham Fire	L 14–24	4–5	Legion Field	31,500	
10	May 25	San Antonio Riders	W 38–9	5–5	Giants Stadium	32,857	

Round	Date	Opponent	Result	Record	Venue	Attendance	Source
Semifinals	June 2	London Monarchs	L 26–42	0–1	Giants Stadium	23,149	

== 1992 season ==
1992 New York/New Jersey Knights season
- Owner: Robert F. X. Sillerman
- General manager: Reggie Williams
- Head coach: Mouse Davis
- Home stadium: Giants Stadium

Results
- Record: 6–4
- Division place: 2nd North American East
- Playoffs: did not qualify

== Staff ==
1992 New York/New Jersey Knights staff
Front office: Owner – Robert F. X. Sillerman; Vice President/General Manager – Reggie Williams; Head coaches: Head Coach – Mouse Davis; Offensive coaches: Co-Offensive Coordinator – Darrel "Pop" Jackson; Co-Offensive Coordinator/Offensive Line – Larry Zierlein; Receivers – Gary Riekes	Defensive coaches: Defensive Coordinator – Joe Haering; Secondary – Jim Elam; Defensive Assistant – Will Lewis; Special teams coaches: Special Teams – Frank Gansz, Jr.

== Roster ==
1992 New York/New Jersey Knights final roster
Quarterbacks: 16 John Evans; 12 Brent Pease; 14 Doug Pederson; 10 Reggie Slack; Running backs: 27 Victor Floyd; 20 Chris McLemore; 40 Eric Wilkerson; Wide receivers: 80 Andre Alexander; 82 Cornell Burbage; 81 Monty Gilbreath; 88 Kip Lewis; 85 Davis Smith; 86 Lonnie Turner; 89 Byron Williams; Tight ends: Vacant	Offensive linemen: 64 Damon Baldwin G; 71 Joey Banes T; 77 Chris Dyko T; 74 Mark Hayes T; 76 Brian Holloway T; 72 Tim Moxley G; 73 Dave Senczyszyn T; 79 Brian Smider G; 54 Leroy Truitt G; 61 Paul Wulff C; Defensive linemen: 95 Joe Brunson DE; 99 Dave Edeen DE; 94 Pat Marlatt DT; 69 Doug Mikolas DT; 92 Craig Schlichting DE; 78 Brian Smith DE; 75 Dennis Tripp DT; 91 Tony Woods DE	Linebackers: 53 Marlon Brown OLB; 58 Cecil Fletcher OLB; 50 Wes Pritchett MLB; 52 Ron Sancho OLB; Defensive backs: 23 Richard Carey CB; 24 Joe Johnson CB; 22 Tony Jones CB; 33 Dan Land FS/SS; 25 Mark Moore SS; 49 Falanda Newton FS; Special teams: 4 Bobby Lilljedahl P; 3 Steve Starcevhich K; 7 Kendall Trainor K	Operation Discovery Vacant Rookies in italics

== Schedule/Results ==
Week	Date	Opponent	Result	Record	Venue	Attendance	Source
1	March 22	at London Monarchs	L 20–26 (OT)	0–1	Wembley Stadium	30,167	
2	March 28	at Barcelona Dragons	L 14–15	0–2	Montjuic Stadium	17,870	
3	April 4	San Antonio Riders	L 3–9	0–3	Giants Stadium	33,659	
4	April 12	at Orlando Thunder	L 21–39	0–4	Florida Citrus Bowl	31,191	
5	April 18	Frankfurt Galaxy	W 24–21	1–4	Giants Stadium	24,943	
6	April 26	at Montreal Machine	W 34–11	2–4	Olympic Stadium	25,890	
7	May 3	London Monarchs	W 41–13	3–4	Giants Stadium	30,112	
8	May 10	at Ohio Glory	W 39–33 (OT)	4–4	Ohio Stadium	20,513	
9	May 16	Barcelona Dragons	W 47–0	5–4	Giants Stadium	22,917	
10	May 23	Montreal Machine	W 41–21	6–4	Giants Stadium	18,277	
