= Bill McArthur (American football) =

American football player and coach (1918–1997)

Biographical details
- Born: July 28, 1918; Keokuk, Iowa, U.S.
- Died: April 24, 1997 (aged 78); Salem, Oregon, U.S.

Playing career
- 1936–1939: UC Santa Barbara
- 1946: Chicago Rockets

Coaching career (HC unless noted)
- 1946: Gold Hill HS (OR)
- 1947–1954: Oregon College
- 1956–1982: Oregon College / Western Oregon
- 1991: Western Oregon

Head coaching record
- Overall: 180–124–6 (college)
- Bowls: 2–0
- Tournaments: 0–2 (NAIA D-I playoffs)

Accomplishments and honors

Championships
- 10 OCC (1950–1954, 1958, 1966–1969); 6 Evergreen (1975–1980)

William D. McArthur (July 28, 1918 – April 24, 1997) was an American football player and coach. He served three stints as the head football coach at Western Oregon University, from 1947 to 1954, from 1956 to 1982, and in 1991, compiling a record of 180–124–6. McArthur spent part of one off-season with the Chicago Rockets of the All-America Football Conference (AAFC) in 1946.

== Head coaching record ==
=== College ===
Year	Team	Overall	Conference	Standing	Bowl/playoffs	NAIA I^{#}
Oregon College Wolves (Independent) (1947–1949)
1947	Oregon College	2–5				
1948	Oregon College	6–3–1				
1949	Oregon College	9–0				
Oregon College Wolves (Oregon Collegiate Conference) (1950–1954)
1950	Oregon College	6–2	3–0	1st		
1951	Oregon College	6–0–1	3–0	1st		
1952	Oregon College	3–3	3–0	1st		
1953	Oregon College	4–4	3–0	1st		
1954	Oregon College	4–4	3–1	T–1st		
Oregon College Wolves (Oregon Collegiate Conference) (1956–1969)
1956	Oregon College	3–4	2–2	T–2nd		
1957	Oregon College	5–3	3–1	2nd		
1958	Oregon College	5–4	4–0	1st		
1959	Oregon College	1–7	0–4	5th		
1960	Oregon College	3–5	1–3	4th		
1961	Oregon College	4–3–1	2–1–1	2nd		
1962	Oregon College	4–4	2–2	3rd		
1963	Oregon College	3–6	1–3	4th		
1964	Oregon College	1–6	0–4	5th		
1965	Oregon College	5–3–1	2–2	T–2nd		
1966	Oregon College	6–2	4–0	1st		
1967	Oregon College	4–4	3–1	T–1st		
1968	Oregon College	7–2	4–0	1st		
1969	Oregon College	6–3	3–0	1st		
Oregon College / Western Oregon Wolves (Evergreen Conference) (1970–1981)
1970	Oregon College	5–5	4–2	3rd		
1971	Oregon College	8–2	4–2	2nd		
1972	Oregon College	6–4	5–1	2nd		
1973	Oregon College	6–3	4–2	T–2nd		
1974	Oregon College	3–4–1	3–2–1	T–2nd		
1975	Oregon College	9–1	6–0	1st	L NAIA Division I Semifinal	9
1976	Oregon College	9–1	6–0	1st	W Oregon Bowl	16
1977	Oregon College	7–2	6–0	1st		
1978	Oregon College	8–2	5–1	1st	L NAIA Division I Quarterfinal	12
1979	Oregon College	8–1–1	5–0	1st	W Oregon Bowl	13
1980	Oregon College	6–3	4–1	T–1st		
1981	Western Oregon	5–4	1–3	4th		
1982	Western Oregon	3–6	1–4	5th		
Western Oregon Wolves (Columbia Football Association) (1991)
1991	Western Oregon	0–9	0–6	7th (Mount Hood)		
Oregon College / Western Oregon:		180–124–6	100–48–2			
Total:		180–124–6				
National championship Conference title Conference division title or championship game berth
