= Tony Woods (gridiron football, born 1966) =

American football player (born 1966)

No. 65, 91
- Position: Defensive lineman

Personal information
- Born: March 19, 1966 (age 60); Fort Lee, Virginia, U.S.
- Listed height: 6 ft 5 in (1.96 m)
- Listed weight: 265 lb (120 kg)

Career information
- High school: Harrison (Colorado Springs, Colorado)
- College: Oklahoma
- NFL draft: 1989: 8th round, 216th overall pick

Career history
- Chicago Bears (1989); New Orleans Saints (1990)*; New York/New Jersey Knights (1991); Dallas Cowboys (1991)*; New York/New Jersey Knights (1992); Edmonton Eskimos (1993–1995); Tampa Bay Storm (1997–1998)
- * Offseason or practice squad member only

Awards and highlights
- Grey Cup champion (1993)
- Stats at Pro Football Reference
- Stats at ArenaFan.com

Clinton Anthony Woods (born March 19, 1966) is an American former professional football defensive lineman who played for the Chicago Bears of the National Football League (NFL). He played college football for the Oklahoma Sooners and was selected by the Bears in the eighth round of the 1989 NFL draft.

== Early life ==
Clinton Anthony Woods was born on March 19, 1966, in Fort Lee, Virginia. He attended Harrison High School in Colorado Springs, Colorado.

== College career ==
Woods enrolled at Rose State College to play junior college football in 1983 but did not end up playing there. He transferred to the University of Oklahoma in 1984. He redshirted the 1984 season and was a four-year letterman from 1985 to 1988.

== Professional career ==
Woods was selected by the Chicago Bears in the eighth round, with the 216th overall pick, of the 1989 NFL draft. He signed with the team on July 27. In August 1989, Bears head coach Mike Ditka said Woods was a "quality football player". He played in 15 games, starting two, for the Bears during the 1989 season and posted one sack.

Woods became a free agent after the 1989 season, and signed with the New Orleans Saints on April 1, 1990. He was released on September 3 before the start of the 1990 regular season.

Woods started all ten games for the New York/New Jersey Knights of the World League of American Football (WLAF) during the 1991 WLAF season, recording 34 tackles, 7.5 sacks, and two forced fumbles. The Knights finished the year with a 5–5 record.

Woods signed with the Dallas Cowboys on July 3, 1991. However, he was later released.

Woods returned to the Knights in 1992 and posted 3.5 sacks. He played in 48 games for the Edmonton Eskimos of the Canadian Football League from 1993 to 1995, totaling 71 tackles, 19.0 sacks, two fumble recoveries, and one pass breakup. He was part of the 1993 Eskimos team that won the 81st Grey Cup. In 1995, Edmonton would not let Woods out of his contract to try out for the Cowboys again. On June 6, 1996, the Eskimos released Woods on the third day of training camp after he was not able to pass his physical due to a knee problem. Woods said he was "shocked" when the team failed his physical, stating "It's just typical tendinitis. I've had it for a couple of years and played with it and it hasn't slowed me down."

Woods played in 18 games for the Tampa Bay Storm of the Arena Football League (AFL) from 1997 to 1998. He was an offensive lineman/defensive lineman during his AFL career as the league played under ironman rules. He recorded AFL career totals of 18 solo tackles, six assisted tackles, one sack, one fumble recovery, four pass breakups, and four receptions for 23 yards.
