= Tom DeSylvia =

American football player and coach (1924–2002)

- DeSylvia in 1948

Biographical details
- Born: September 29, 1924; Butte, Montana, U.S.
- Died: December 6, 2002 (aged 78); Portland, Oregon, U.S.

Playing career
- 1946–1949: Oregon State
- 1950: Philadelphia Eagles*
- Position: Guard

Coaching career (HC unless noted)
- 1953–1961: Jefferson HS (OR)
- 1962: Portland State
- 1969: David Douglas HS (OR)
- ?: Grant HS (OR)

Head coaching record
- Overall: 4–4 (college)

Accomplishments and honors

Championships
- 2 OSAA (1957, 1958)

Thomas Elias DeSylvia (September 29, 1924 – December 6, 2002) was a high school and college football head coach at various high schools in Portland, Oregon and for one season at Portland State. DeSylvia played at the guard position at Oregon State between 1946 and 1949. He was drafted by the Philadelphia Eagles of the National Football League (NFL) in the 1950 NFL draft.

DeSylvia was inducted into the Oregon Sports Hall of Fame in 1997.

== Playing career ==
DeSylvia played at the guard position at Oregon State between 1946 and 1949. During his tenure at Oregon State, DeSylvia competed in the 1948 East–West Shrine Game, served as team captain in 1949 and was selected to the Oregon State University Sports Hall of Fame in 1994 for his accomplishments. DeSylvia was drafted in the 24th round of the 1950 NFL draft by the Philadelphia Eagles. He was released the following August before ever competing in a regular-season game.

== Coaching career ==
=== High school ===
After leaving professional football, DeSylvia began his coaching career. He was noted for his time as head football coach at Jefferson High School in Portland between 1953 and 1961. During that span, Jefferson won OSAA Championships in 1957 and 1958 and OSAA runner-up in 1959. In addition to the championships, DeSylvia led Jefferson to an Oregon large-school record of 34 consecutive victories between 1957 and 1959, in addition to coaching future Heisman Trophy winner Terry Baker and Pro Football Hall of Fame member Mel Renfro.

Following a one-year stint as head coach at Portland State, DeSylvia returned to the high school ranks to lead both David Douglas High School and Grant High School prior to his retirement. For his impact on sport in Oregon, he was elected to the Oregon Sports Hall of Fame in 1997.

== Head coaching record ==
Year	Team	Overall	Conference	Standing	Bowl/playoffs
Portland State Vikings (Oregon Collegiate Conference) (1962)
1962	Portland State	4–4	3–1	2nd	
Portland State:		4–4	3–1		
Total:		4–4			
