= Lance Zierlein =

American radio personality

Lance Zierlein is a sports analyst and commentator. He has hosted sports talk shows on KILT 610, KBME 790, KGOW 1560 AM, and KFNC 97.5 FM in Houston, Texas and is an NFL Draft Analyst for NFL Network and NFL.com. He was inducted into the Texas Radio Hall of Fame in November of 2024.

== Career ==
Zierlein graduated from Lamar Consolidated High School in 1988. Following high school, he attended Tulane University. After college, Zierlein created "Pigskin Sports" which was a sports analysis company, and began to appear on radio stations around the country including in markets such as Houston, Baton Rouge and Miami. Zierlein was also a weekly football expert for the weekend show on Prime Sports Radio. He began his career working at 610 KILT on a weekend show called "Fast Break with Nate" along with his partner Nate Griffin. Shortly thereafter, he joined John Granato in 1997 to create "The Bench", which was the top-rated sports talk show in Houston for the better part of a decade. After a falling out with management he and his co-host John Granato created a new station, KGOW. In 2008, the morning drive time pair was voted "Best Talk Radio" by the Houston Press.

Zierlein is a former blogger for the Houston Chronicle and ran a football site called The Sideline View.

Zierlein began his role as NFL draft analyst and content provider for NFL.com in November 2014 and continues in that role today. He is responsible for writing the strength and weaknesses for over 500 draft profiles each season and is one of the lead analysts on the NFL Now mobile platform during combine and NFL draft broadcasts and appears on NFL Network programming and the Move The Sticks podcast during the lead up to the NFL draft.

Zierlein worked at 790 KBME as a morning sports talk radio host from 2011 to 2017.

== Personal life ==
He has five children.

Lance's father is football coach Larry Zierlein.
