= 1961 Oregon Collegiate Conference football season =

- Sport: Football
- Number of teams: 5
- Champion: Southern Oregon

Football seasons
- ← 1960 1962 →

1961 Oregon Collegiate Conference football standings
	Conf.					Overall
Team	W		L		T	W		L		T
Southern Oregon $	4	–	0	–	0	5	–	4	–	0
Oregon College of Education	2	–	1	–	1	4	–	3	–	1
Portland State	2	–	2	–	0	3	–	5	–	0
Oregon Tech	1	–	2	–	1	4	–	4	–	1
Eastern Oregon	0	–	4	–	0	1	–	7	–	0
$ – Conference champion

The 1961 Oregon Collegiate Conference football season was the season of college football played by the five member schools of the Oregon Collegiate Conference (OCC) as part of the 1961 college football season. The 1961 Southern Oregon Red Raiders football team, led by head coach Al Akins, compiled an undefeated 4–0 record in conference games (1–4 in non-conference games) and won the OCC conference championship.

Southern Oregon led the OCC in total offense with 3,037 yards, an average of 337.4 yards per game. Oregon Tech led the conference defensively, giving up an average of 256.1 yards per game in total defense and 152.7 yards per game in rushing defense.

The 1961 OCC all-conference team was led by Southern Oregon with seven players named to the first team and Oregon College of Education (OCE) with six first-team honorees. Southern Oregon quarterback Doug Olsen set new OCC records with 1,377 passing yards and 1,462 yards of total offense. OCE halfback Bob Pennel also set a new conference record with 864 rushing yards. Portland State's Bill White was the OCC scoring leader with 84 points. Southern Oregon end Howard Hartman was the OCC's leading receiver with 51 receptions for 631 yards.

== Conference overview ==
Conf. rank	Team	Head coach	Conf. record	Overall record	Points scored	Points against	Total offense (yds/game)	Total defense (yds/game)
1	Southern Oregon	Al Akins	4–0	5–4	200	140	337.4	272.5
2	Oregon College of Education	Bill McArthur	2–1–1	4–3–1	159	132	296.8	287.8
3	Portland State	Hugh Smithwick	2–2	3–5	141	222	279.0	339.8
4	Oregon Tech	Rex Hunsaker	1–2–1	4–4–1	84	139	194.6	256.1
5	Eastern Oregon	Archie Dunsmoor	0–4	1–7	80	210	179.8	318.7

== Teams ==
=== Southern Oregon ===
1961 Southern Oregon Red Raiders football

OCC champion
- Conference: Oregon Collegiate Conference
- Record: 5–4 (4–0 OCC)
- Head coach: Al Akins (7th season)
- Home stadium: Fuller Field

The 1961 Southern Oregon Red Raiders football team represented Southern Oregon College (now known as Southern Oregon University) of Ashland, Oregon. In their seventh year under head coach Al Akins, the team compiled a 5–4 record (4–0 against OCC opponents) and won the OCC championship.

Seven Southern Oregon players were named to the 1961 OCC all-conference team: quarterback Doug Olsen; fullback Al Barnes; ends Howard Hartman and Dave Hughes; defensive end Jess Munyon; linebacker John Buck; and defensive halfback Doyle Branson.

Olsen set OCC records with 1,377 passing yards and 1,462 yards of total offense. End Howard Hartman was the OCC's leading receiver with 51 receptions for 631 yards.

Date	Opponent	Site	Result	Attendance	Source
September 16	at Chico State*	College Field; Chico, CA	L 0–27	3,800	
September 23	at Linfield*	Maxwell Field; McMinnville, OR	L 25–34		
September 30	Lewis & Clark*	Fuller Field; Ashland, OR	L 26–28		
October 7	at Sacramento State*	Charles C. Hughes Stadium; Sacramento, CA	L 6–25	3,000	
October 14	at Portland State	Portland, OR	W 39–19		
October 21	Oregon Tech^{†}	Fuller Field; Ashland, OR	W 6–0		
October 28	Oregon College of Education	Fuller Field; Ashland, OR	W 26–7		
November 4	at Eastern Oregon	La Grande, OR	W 39–0		
November 11	at Pacific (OR)*	McCready Stadium; Forest Grove, OR	W 33–0		
*Non-conference game; ^{†}Homecoming

=== Oregon College of Education ===
1961 Oregon College of Education Wolves football
- Conference: Oregon Collegiate Conference
- Record: 4–3–1 (2–1–1 OCC)
- Head coach: Bill McArthur (6th season)

The 1961 Oregon College of Education Wolves football team represented Oregon College of Education (commonly referred to as "OCE", now known as Western Oregon University) of Monmouth, Oregon. In their sixth year under head coach Bill McArthur, the team compiled a 4–3–1 record (2–1–1 against OCC opponents) and finished in second place in the OCC.

Six OCE players were named to the 1961 OCC all-conference football team: halfback Bob Pennel; tackle Herb Harmann; center Francis Tresler; defensive end Frank Colburn; and defensive halfbacks Dick Wildfang.

Date	Opponent	Site	Result	Attendance	Source
September 30	at Linfield	Maxwell Field; McMinnville, OR	L 7–13		
October 7	Eastern Oregon	Monmouth, OR	W 34–14		
October 14	at Pacific (OR)	Forest Grove, OR	W 27–14		
October 21	Portland State^{†}	Monmouth, OR	W 26–24		
October 28	at Southern Oregon	Fuller Field; Ashland, OR	L 7–26		
November 4	at Oregon Tech	Modoc Field; Klamath Falls, OR	T 7–7		
November 11	Lewis & Clark	Monmouth, OR	L 13–28		
November 18	Lower Columbia JC	Monmouth, OR	W 38–6		
^{†}Homecoming

=== Portland State ===
1961 Portland State Vikings football
- Conference: Oregon Collegiate Conference
- Record: 3–5 (2–2 OCC)
- Head coach: Hugh Smithwick (3rd season)

The 1961 Portland State Vikings football team represented Portland State College (now known as Portland State University) of Portland, Oregon. In their third and final year under head coach Hugh Smithwick, the team compiled a 3–5 record (2–2 against OCC opponents) and finished in third place in the OCC.

Four Portland State players were named to the 1961 OCC all-conference team: halfback Bill White; tackle Bob Williams; defensive tackle Mike Hafterson; and linebacker Bob Holcomb.

Date	Opponent	Site	Result	Attendance	Source
September 23	Lewis & Clark*	Roosevelt HS field; Portland, OR	L 6–39	2,300	
September 30	at Nevada*	Mackay Stadium; Reno, NV	L 20–41	4,000	
October 7	Oregon Tech	Portland, OR	W 13–7		
October 14	Southern Oregon	Portland, OR	L 19–39		
October 21	Oregon College of Education	Monmouth, OR	L 24–26		
October 28	at Eastern Oregon	La Grande, OR	W 27–7		
November 11	Linfield*	Maxwell Field; McMinnville, OR	L 19–55		
November 18	Western Washington^{†}*	Portland, OR	W 13–7		
*Non-conference game; ^{†}Homecoming

=== Oregon Tech ===
1961 Oregon Tech Owls football
- Conference: Oregon Collegiate Conference
- Record: 4–4–1 (1–2–1 OCC)
- Head coach: Rex Hunsaker (2nd season)
- Home stadium: Modoc Field

The 1961 Oregon Tech Owls football team represented Oregon Technical Institute (now known as Oregon Institute of Technology) of Klamath Falls, Oregon. In their second year under head coach Rex Hunsaker, the team compiled a 4–4–1 record (1–2–1 against OCC opponents) and finished in fourth place in the OCC.

Four Oregon Tech players, all on defense, were selected to the 1961 OCC all-conference team: defensive tackle Jim Madden; guard W. Winterbottom; linebacker Jack Williams; and defensive halfbacks Andrew Cook.

Date	Opponent	Site	Result	Attendance	Source
September 16	Westminster (ID)*	Modoc Field; Klamath Falls, WA	W 12–6		
September 23	at Whitworth*	Spokane, WA	L 0–47		
September 30	Grays Harbor*	Modoc Field; Klamath Falls, OR	W 14–7		
October 7	at Portland State	Portland, OR	L 7–13		
October 14	Eastern Oregon	Modoc Field; Klamath Falls, OR	W 25–13		
October 21	Southern Oregon	Ashland, OR	L 0–6		
October 28	at Humboldt State	Redwood Bowl; Arcata, CA	L 7–41	4,500	
November 4	Oregon College of Education^{†}	Modoc Field; Klamath Falls, OR	T 7–7		
November 11	College of Idaho*	Modoc Field; Klamath Falls, OR	W 12–6		
*Non-conference game; ^{†}Homecoming

=== Eastern Oregon ===
1961 Eastern Oregon Mountaineers football
- Conference: Oregon Collegiate Conference
- Record: 1–7 (0–4 OCC)
- Head coach: Archie Dunsmoor (7th season)

The 1961 Eastern Oregon Mountaineers football team represented Eastern Oregon College (now known as Eastern Oregon University) of La Grande, Oregon. In their seventh year under head coach Archie Dunsmoor, the team compiled a 1–7 record (0–4 against OCC opponents) and finished in last place in the OCC.

Eastern Oregon offensive guard Gordon Meyers was named to the 1961 OCC all-conference football team.

Date	Opponent	Site	Result	Attendance	Source
September 23	College of Idaho*	La Grande, OR	L 0–14		
September 30	at Whitman*	Walla Walla, WA	W 19–13		
October 7	at Oregon College of Education	Monmouth, OR	L 14–34		
October 14	at Oregon Tech	Klamath Falls, OR	L 13–25		
October 21	at Olympic*	Bremerton, WA	L 7–18		
October 28	Portland State	La Grande, OR	L 7–27		
November 4	Southern Oregon	La Grande, OR	L 0–39		
November 11	Columbia Basin*	La Grande, OR	L 20–40		
*Non-conference game

== Statistical leaders ==
=== Team statistics ===
==== Total offense ====
1. Southern Oregon - 3,037 yards (337.4 yards per game) on 605 plays
2. OCE - 2,375 yards (296.8 yards per game) on 457 plays
3. Portland State - 2,232 yards (279.0 yards per game) on 527 plays
4. Oregon Tech - 1,752 yards (194.6 yards per game) on 508 plays
5. Eastern Oregon - 1,439 yards (179.8 yards per game) on 447 plays

==== Rush offense ====
1. OCE - 1,777 yards (222.1 yards per game)
2. Southern Oregon - 1,612 yards (179.1 yards per game)
3. Portland State - 1,401 yards (175.1 yards per game)
4. Oregon Tech - 1,313 yards (145.8 yards per game)
5. Eastern Oregon - 898 yards (112.2 yards per game)

==== Pass offense ====
1. Southern Oregon - 1,425 yards
2. Portland State - 831 yards
3. OCE - 598 yards
4. Eastern Oregon - 541 yards
5. Oregon Tech - 439 yards

==== Total defense ====
1. Oregon Tech - 2,305 yards (256.1 yards per game) on 513 plays
2. Southern Oregon - 2,453 yards (272.5 yards per game) on 550 plays
3. OCE - 2,303 yards (287.8 yards per game) on 489 plays
4. Eastern Oregon - 2,550 yards (318.7 yards per game) on 522 plays
5. Portland State - 2,719 yards (339.8 yards per game) on 497 plays

==== Rush defense ====
1. Oregon Tech - 1,375 yards (152.7 yards per game)
2. OCE - 1,364 yards (170.5 yards per game)
3. Southern Oregon - 1,572 yards (174.6 yards per game)
4. Eastern Oregon - 1,688 yards (191.3 yards per game)
5. Portland State - 1,876 yards (234.5 yards per game)

==== Pass defense ====
1. Southern Oregon - 65 completions, 881 yards, 417 completion pct.
2. Oregon Tech - 68 completions, 930 yards, .524 completion pct.
3. Portland State - 54 completions, 843 yards, .403 completion pct.
4. Eastern Oregon - 59 completions, 862 yards, .476 completion pct.
5. OCE - 75 completions, 939 yards, .490 completion pct.

=== Individual statistics ===
==== Scoring ====
1. Bill White, Portland State - 84 points (14 TD)
2. Al Barnes, Southern Oregon - 60 points (10 TD)
3. Bob Pennel, OCE - 48 points (6 TD)
4. Clayton Ladd, OCE - 48 points (6 TD)
5. Howard Hartman, Southern Oregon - 43 points (6 TD, 1 PAT)

==== Rushing ====
1. Bob Pennel, OCE - 864 yards on 151 carries (5.7 yards per carry)
2. White, Portland State - 851 yards on 144 carries (5.9 yards per carry)
3. Al Barnes, Southern Oregon - 727 yards on 142 carries (5.1 yards per carry)
4. Showers, Eastern Oregon - 545 yards on 157 carries (3.4 yards per carry)
5. Ladd, OCE - 533 yards on 114 carries (4.6 yards per carry)

==== Passing ====
1. Doug Olsen, Southern Oregon - 103 of 195 passing for 1,377 yards
2. Grant, Portland State - 56 of 145 passing for 828 yards
3. Ransome, Oregon Tech - 44 of 125 passing for 440 yards
4. Burns, OCE - 40 of 67 passing for 569 yards
5. Showers, Eastern Orego - 31 of 190 passing for 311 yards

==== Receiving ====
1. Howard Hartman, Southern Oregon - 51 receptions for 611 yards and six touchdowns
2. Huges, Southern Oregon - 32 receptions for 445 yards and 2 touchdowns
3. Bates, Eastern Oregon - 17 receptions for 199 yards and 2 touchdowns
4. Myers, Oregon Tech - 11 receptions for 177 yards and 1 touchdown
5. Weber, Portland State - 10 receptions for 129 yards and 3 touchdowns

== All-conference selections ==
After the season, the conference coaches selected their 1961 all-conference team consisting of the following players:

Offense

- Quarterback - Doug Olsen, sophomore, Southern Oregon
- Fullback - Al Barnes, junior, Southern Oregon
- Halfbacks - Bill White, sophomore, Portland State; Bob Pennel, junior, Oregon College of Education
- Ends - Howard Hartman, sophomore, Southern Oregon; Dave Hughes, junior, Southern Oregon
- Tackles - Bob Williams, senior, Portland State; Herb Hermann, senior, Oregon College of Education
- Guards - Gordon Meyers, senior, Eastern Oregon; Jerry Gilman, senior, Oregon College of Education;
- Center Francis Tresler, senior Oregon College of Education

Defense

- Defensive ends - Jess Munyon, junior, Southern Oregon; Frank Colburn, senior, Oregon College of Education
- Defensive tackles - Jim Madden, senior, Oregon Tech; Mike Hafterson, sophomore, Portland State
- Guard - W. Winterbottom, junior, Oregon Tech
- Linebackers - John Buck, junior, Southern Oregon; Bob Holcomb, senior, Portland State; Jack Williams, sophomore, Oregon Tech
- Defensive halfbacks - Doyle Bransom, Southern Oregon; Andrew Cook, senior, Oregon Tech; Dick Wildfang, freshman, Oregon College of Education
