= Ralph Davis (American football coach) =

American football coach (1920–2016)

Biographical details
- Born: January 21, 1920; Portland, Oregon, U.S.
- Died: August 16, 2016 (aged 96); Portland, Oregon, U.S.

Coaching career (HC unless noted)
- 1955–1956: Portland State

Head coaching record
- Overall: 4–11–1

Ralph Scott Davis Jr. (January 21, 1920 – August 14, 2016) was an American college football coach. He was head coach of the Portland State Vikings football program in Portland, Oregon. He held the position for the 1955 and 1956 seasons and ended with a record of 4 wins, 11 losses, and 1 tie.

Davis found greater success as a track and field coach at the school. He was head coach from 1954 through 1970 and produced two national champions during that time. The school named him to their "Athletic Hall of Fame" in 1998. He retired from coaching in 1970 to devote full-time efforts to teaching at the school. David died in 2016, aged 96.

== Head coaching record ==
=== Football ===
Year	Team	Overall	Conference	Standing	Bowl/playoffs
Portland State Vikings (Oregon Collegiate Conference) (1955–1956)
1955	Portland State	2–6	1–3	4th	
1956	Portland State	2–5–1	1–3	T–3rd	
Portland State:		4–11–1	2–6		
Total:		4–11–1			
