= Fabray Collins =

American football player (born 1961)

No. 59
- Position: Linebacker

Personal information
- Born: September 16, 1961 (age 65); Chicago, Illinois, U.S.
- Listed height: 6 ft 2 in (1.88 m)
- Listed weight: 215 lb (98 kg)

Career information
- High school: Paul Robeson
- College: Southern Illinois
- NFL draft: 1984: undrafted

Career history
- Minnesota Vikings (1987); Pittsburgh Gladiators (1988-1990); New York/New Jersey Knights (1991)
- Stats at Pro Football Reference

Fabray R. Collins (born September 16, 1961) is an American former professional football player who was a linebacker for the Minnesota Vikings of National Football League (NFL). He played college football for the Southern Illinois University Carbondale.
