= Andre Alexander =

American football player (born 1967)

Profile
- Position: Wide receiver

Personal information
- Born: April 15, 1967 (age 59); San Francisco, California
- Listed height: 5 ft 6 in (1.68 m)
- Listed weight: 165 lb (75 kg)

Career information
- High school: Balboa High(San Francisco Ca.)
- College: Fresno State

Career history
- 1989: Calgary Stampeders
- 1991–1992: New York/New Jersey Knights

Andre Alexander (born April 15, 1967) is a former gridiron football wide receiver who played for the Calgary Stampeders of the Canadian Football League and the New York/New Jersey Knights of the World League of American Football. In 1989, he caught 19 receptions for 311 yards and a two touchdowns across seven games. Andre also holds the San Francisco 100meter record at 10.42 which he set in 1985. Inducted into the San Francisco Prep HALL OF FAME on 9/28/24.
