= Chris Fisk =

American football coach (born c. 1977)

Current position
- Title: Head coach
- Team: Portland State
- Conference: Big Sky
- Record: 0–1

Biographical details
- Born: c. 1977 (age 48–49); Pocatello, Idaho, U.S.
- Education: University of Jamestown (2001); University of Mary (2004)

Playing career
- 1996–1998: Jamestown
- 1999: Southwestern (KS)
- Position: Center

Coaching career (HC unless noted)
- 2002–2006: Mary (OL)
- 2007–2010: Mary (OC)
- 2011–2015: Southern Oregon (co-OC/OL)
- 2016–2018: Central Washington (co-OC/OL)
- 2019–2025: Central Washington
- 2026–present: Portland State

Head coaching record
- Overall: 48–23
- Tournaments: 2–4 (NCAA D-II playoffs)

Accomplishments and honors

Championships
- 2 GNAC (2019, 2021); 1 LSC (2025)

Awards
- GNAC Coach of the Year (2021)

Christopher Fisk (born c. 1977) is an American college football coach for Portland State. He was previously the head football coach for Central Washington University, a position he held from 2019 until 2025. He previously coached for Mary and Southern Oregon. He played college football for Jamestown and Southwestern (KS).

== Head coaching record ==
Year	Team	Overall	Conference	Standing	Bowl/playoffs	AFCA^{#}	D2^{°}
Central Washington Wildcats (Great Northwest Athletic Conference) (2019–2021)
2019	Central Washington	7–4	5–1	T–1st			
2020–21	Central Washington	0–1	0–0	N/A			
2021	Central Washington	8–3	4–0	1st	L NCAA Division II First Round		
Central Washington Wildcats (Lone Star Conference) (2022–2025)
2022	Central Washington	6–4	6–3	2nd			
2023	Central Washington	9–4	7–1	2nd	L NCAA Division II Quarterfinal	17	10
2024	Central Washington	8–4	7–2	2nd	L NCAA Division II First Round	24	
2025	Central Washington	10–2	9–0	1st	L NCAA Division II First Round	13	13
Central Washington:		48–22	38–7				
Portland State Vikings (Big Sky Conference) (2026–present)
2026	Portland State	0–1	0–1				
Portland State:		0–1	0–1				
Total:		48–23					
National championship Conference title Conference division title or championship game berth
