= Joe Holland (coach) =

American football, basketball, and baseball coach

Biographical details
- Born: September 7, 1916; Grand Forks County, North Dakota, U.S.
- Died: January 23, 1992 (aged 75); Portland, Oregon, U.S.

Coaching career (HC unless noted)

Football
- 1947–1954: Vanport

Basketball
- 1947–1948: Vanport

Baseball
- 1946–1948: Vanport

Administrative career (AD unless noted)
- 1946–1964: Vanport / Portland State

Head coaching record
- Overall: 20–42–3 (football); 14–5 (basketball)

Joseph Vernon Holland (September 7, 1916 – January 23, 1992) was an American football, basketball, and baseball coach. He was the first head football coach for the Vanport Vikings (now the Portland State Vikings) located in Portland, Oregon. He held that position for eight seasons, from 1947 until 1954. His coaching record at Vanport was 20–42–3. Holland also served as Vanport's men's basketball during the 1947–48 season and as head baseball coach from 1946 to 1948. Holland also served as athletic director for Vanport and subsequently Portland State College from 1946 to 1964.

== Head coaching record ==
=== Football ===
Year	Team	Overall	Conference	Standing	Bowl/playoffs
Vanport Vikings (Independent) (1947–1949)
1947	Vanport	1–8			
1948	Vanport	1–5–2			
1949	Vanport	5–4			
Vanport:		7–17–2			
Vanport / Portland State Vikings (Oregon Collegiate Conference) (1950–1954)
1950	Vanport	1–5–1	0–2–1	3rd	
1951	Vanport	3–5	1–2	3rd	
1952	Portland State	0–9	0–3	4th	
1953	Portland State	5–2	2–1	2nd	
1954	Portland State	3–5	2–2	T–3rd	
Vanport:		12–26	5–10		
Total:		20–42–3			

=== Basketball ===
Record table
Season	Team	Overall	Conference	Standing	Postseason
Vanport Vikings (NAIA independent) (1947–1948)
1947–48	Vanport	14–5			
Vanport:		14–5			
Total:		14–5			
