= Jerry Lyons =

American football coach

Biographical details
- Education: University of Washington (1949); University of Oregon

Coaching career (HC unless noted)
- 1961–1962: Madison HS (OR)
- 1963–1967: Portland State

Head coaching record
- Overall: 21–24–1 (college)

Jerry Lyons is an American former football coach. He served as the head football coach at Portland State University in Portland, Oregon for five seasons, from 1963 to 1967, compiling a record of 21–24–1.

== Head coaching record ==
=== College ===
Year	Team	Overall	Conference	Standing	Bowl/playoffs
Portland State Vikings (Oregon Collegiate Conference) (1963–1964)
1963	Portland State	6–2	4–0	1st	
1964	Portland State	4–4–1	3–0–1	T–1st	
Portland State:		10–6–1	7–0–1		
Portland State Vikings (NCAA College Division independent) (1965–1967)
1965	Portland State	3–6			
1966	Portland State	4–6			
1967	Portland State	4–6			
Portland State:		11–18			
Total:		21–24–1			
National championship Conference title Conference division title or championship game berth
