= Nigel Burton =

American football player, coach, and commentator (born 1976)

Biographical details
- Born: July 30, 1976 (age 50); Sacramento, California, U.S.

Playing career
- 1995: Pacific (CA)
- 1996–1998: Washington
- Position: Safety

Coaching career (HC unless noted)
- 2000: South Florida (GA)
- 2001–2002: Portland State (DB)
- 2003–2007: Oregon State (DB)
- 2008–2009: Nevada (DC)
- 2010–2014: Portland State

Head coaching record
- Overall: 21–36

Nigel Burton (born July 30, 1976) is an American football commentator and the former head coach for the Portland State Vikings.

== Playing career ==
Burton grew up in Sacramento where he attended Jesuit High School. He attended the University of the Pacific in 1995, but when the school eliminated its football program the following year, he transferred to the University of Washington, where he graduated in 1999 with a bachelor's degree. He played safety for both schools' football teams. He earned all-academic honors from the Pacific-10 Conference three times at Washington and later earned a masters in business administration at the University of South Florida.

== Coaching career ==
Burton's first coaching job was as a defensive assistant for South Florida in 2000. From 2001 to 2002, he coached defensive backs at Portland State, and then from 2003 to 2007, coached the secondary at Oregon State. In 2008, Burton was named defensive coordinator at Nevada.

In 2009, Burton was selected to replace Jerry Glanville as the head coach at Portland State. He became the second African American head football coach in school history after Ron Stratten, who coached in the early 1970s. Burton was fired after the 2014 season and compiled an overall record of 21–36 during his tenure at Portland State.

In 2015, Burton joined Pac-12 Networks as an analyst.

== Personal ==
Burton is married and has two children.

== Head coaching record ==
Year	Team	Overall	Conference	Standing	Bowl/playoffs
Portland State Vikings (Big Sky Conference) (2010–2014)
2010	Portland State	2–9	1–7	8th	
2011	Portland State	7–4	5–3	T–3rd	
2012	Portland State	3–8	2–6	T–11th	
2013	Portland State	6–6	3–5	9th	
2014	Portland State	3–9	2–6	T–10th	
Portland State:		21–36	12–27		
Total:		21–36			
