= Ron Stratten =

American football player and coach (born 1943)

Biographical details
- Born: 1943 (age 82–83); San Francisco, California, U.S.
- Education: University of Oregon

Playing career
- 1961–1963: Oregon
- Positions: Center, linebacker

Coaching career (HC unless noted)
- 1968–1971: Oregon (DL)
- 1972–1974: Portland State

Head coaching record
- Overall: 9–24

Ron Stratten (born 1943) is an American former football coach. He served as the head football coach at Portland State University team from 1972 to 1974. He compiled an overall record of 9–24 in three seasons. Stratten was one of the first African American head football coaches at a university with a majority white enrollment.

Stratten resigned after three seasons due to the team's poor performance. He was succeeded by Mouse Davis, the offensive coordinator he had hired a year earlier. After leaving coaching, he worked for the NCAA's education services division, and is now Head of Innovation at StrataSoles Enterprises, based in San Diego County, California.

Stratten grew up in San Francisco and attended Lowell High School, where he played linebacker and fullback. He played college football at University of Oregon from 1961 to 1963, and was the Ducks' defensive line coach from 1968 to 1971.

== Head coaching record ==
| Year | Team | Overall | Conference | Standing | Bowl/playoffs |
|---|---|---|---|---|---|
Portland State Vikings (NCAA College Division / Division II independent) (1972–1974)
| 1972 | Portland State | 3–8 | | | |
| 1973 | Portland State | 1–10 | | | |
| 1974 | Portland State | 5–6 | | | |
| Total: | | 9–24 | | | |
