= Bruce Barnum =

American football coach

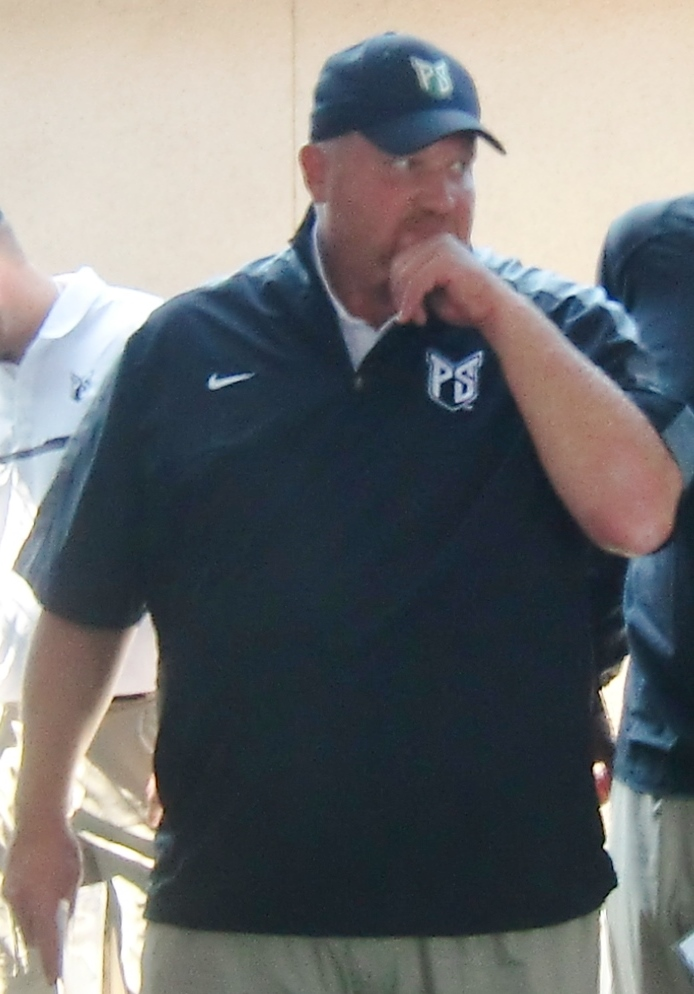
- Barnum in 2016 at CEFCU Stadium

Biographical details
- Born: April 13, 1964 (age 62); Vancouver, Washington, U.S.
- Education: Eastern Washington (1987); Western Washington (1991)

Coaching career (HC unless noted)
- 1986: Central Valley HS (WA) (AC)
- 1987–1988: Columbia River HS (WA) (AC)
- 1989–1990: Western Washington (OL)
- 1991–1992: Cornell (OL)
- 1993: American International (OL)
- 1994–1997: Coast Guard (AHC/OL)
- 1998: Idaho State (OL)
- 1999: Idaho State (DL)
- 2000: Idaho State (DC)
- 2001–2006: Idaho State (OC)
- 2007–2009: Cornell (OC/OL)
- 2010–2014: Portland State (OC)
- 2015–2025: Portland State

Head coaching record
- Overall: 39–75

Accomplishments and honors

Awards
- STATS FCS Coach of the Year (2015); Big Sky Coach of the Year (2015)

Bruce Eugene Barnum (born April 13, 1964) is an American football coach. He was the head football coach at Portland State University from 2015 until 2025.

== Early life and education ==
Born in Vancouver, Washington, Barnum graduated from Columbia River High School in Vancouver in 1982. He then attended Eastern Washington University and participated on the scout team of the Eastern Washington Eagles football team for two seasons. Barnum completed his bachelor's degree in education and history at Eastern Washington University in 1987 and M.Ed. at Western Washington University in 1991.

== Coaching career ==
Barnum began his coaching career as a high school assistant coach in Washington state, first at Central Valley High School in Spokane Valley in 1986 then with his alma mater Columbia River High School from 1987 to 1988.

From 1989 to 1990, Barnum was offensive line coach at Division II Western Washington University. Barnum moved up to the Division I level in 1991 as assistant offensive line coach and freshman offensive coordinator at Cornell, where he would remain for two seasons under Jim Hofher. In 1993, Barnum returned to the Division II level as offensive line coach and run game coordinator at American International College.

Barnum then coached at the Division III level, at Coast Guard as offensive line coach and assistant head coach from 1994 to 1997. After his stint at Coast Guard, Barnum returned to the Division I level at Idaho State and started as offensive line coach in 1998 under Tom Walsh. Under new head coach Larry Lewis, Barnum moved to the defensive line in 1999 and was promoted to defensive coordinator the following season. From 2001 to 2006, Barnum was offensive coordinator.

In 2007, Barnum returned to Cornell as offensive coordinator and offensive line coach, positions he held from 2007 to 2009, this time under Jim Knowles. In 2010, Barnum joined Nigel Burton's coaching staff at Portland State as offensive coordinator.

After he was appointed interim head coach after Nigel Burton was fired in November 2014, Barnum was named as the Vikings' permanent replacement as head coach on December 8, 2014.

Barnum led the Vikings to a 24–17 upset over the Washington State Cougars at Martin Stadium in Pullman, WA on September 5, 2015 for his first career victory as head coach. On October 10 Portland State defeated North Texas 66–7, giving Barnum and the Vikings their second victory over an FBS school in 2015. The 59-point win set a new NCAA record for the largest margin of victory by an FCS school over an FBS opponent. Barnum became the inaugural STATS FCS Coach of the Year for leading Portland State to a 9–3 season and first FCS Playoff appearance in 15 years. This was his most successful season at Portland State and the only one in which the team managed a winning record. He was fired following a 1–11 season in 2025.

Barnum has occasionally been criticized for deriding opposing teams. For example, in the week leading up to Portland State's 2016 road matchup with Southern Utah, he caused ripples of outrage in the Utah media when he stated, referring to Cedar City, UT (home of SUU), "I didn't want to stay in Whoville. We are going to stay up in the Grinch's Castle [referring to nearby Brian Head, UT]. We are going to go down, play them Saturday, whoop up on them." In response to the comments, SUU fans showed up to the game en masse, setting a single-game school attendance record. Many carried signs and banners mocking Barnum's statements, while others dressed up as characters from "How the Grinch Stole Christmas". SUU won the game, 45–31.

== Personal life ==
Barnum married the former Shawna Quigley in 1994. They have two children,. In July 2017, Barnum was publicly disciplined by Portland State University following the revelation of an inappropriate relationship with a married female staff member. Barnum received "significant economic sanctions" from the University following the investigation.

== Head coaching record ==
Year	Team	Overall	Conference	Standing	Bowl/playoffs	Coaches^{#}	STATS^{°}
Portland State Vikings football (Big Sky Conference) (2015–2025)
2015	Portland State	9–3	6–2	T–2nd	L NCAA Division I Second Round	10	10
2016	Portland State	3–8	2–6	T–9th			
2017	Portland State	0–11	0–8	13th			
2018	Portland State	4–7	3–5	T–9th			
2019	Portland State	5–7	3–5	T–6th			
2020–21	Portland State	0–1	0–0 (Note: Portland State opted out of the conference season, but still scheduled non-conference games due to COVID-19 concerns.)				
2021	Portland State	5–6	4–4	T–7th			
2022	Portland State	4–7	3–5	7th			
2023	Portland State	5–6	4–4	T–6th			
2024	Portland State	3–8	3–5	T–6th			
2025	Portland State	1–11	1–7	12th			
Portland State:		39–75	29–51				
Total:		39–75					
^{#}Rankings from final FCS Coaches Poll.; ^{°}Rankings from final STATS FCS Poll.
