= Mouse Davis =

American football player and coach (born 1932)

Biographical details
- Born: September 6, 1932 (age 94); Palouse, Washington, U.S.

Playing career
- 1951–1954: Oregon College
- Positions: Quarterback, halfback

Coaching career (HC unless noted)
- 1975–1980: Portland State
- 1981: California (OC)
- 1982: Toronto Argonauts (OC)
- 1984: Houston Gamblers (OC)
- 1985: Denver Gold
- 1988–1990: Detroit Lions (OC)
- 1991–1992: New York/New Jersey Knights
- 1993: Toronto Argonauts (OC)
- 1994–1995: Atlanta Falcons (QB)
- 2001–2002: Detroit Fury
- 2003: San Diego Riptide
- 2004–2006: Hawaii (ST/RB)
- 2007–2008: Portland State (OC)
- 2009–2010: Hawaii (WR)

Head coaching record
- Overall: 42–24 (college); 79–29 (high school); 11–8 (USFL); 11–10 (WLAF); 8–20 (AFL); 6–10 (AF2)

Darrel "Mouse" Davis (born September 6, 1932) is a retired American football coach and former player. A veteran coach at the high school, college, and professional levels, he last coached with Jerry Glanville at Portland State University and with June Jones at the University of Hawaiʻi at Mānoa. Davis served as the head football coach at Portland State from 1975 to 1980, compiling a record of 42–24. He has also been a head coach with the Denver Gold of the United States Football League (1985), the New York/New Jersey Knights of the World League of American Football (1991–1992), and the Detroit Fury of the Arena Football League (2001–2002) and the San Diego Riptide (2003) of the AF2. A native of Washington, Davis grew up in Oregon, where he started his coaching career as a high school football coach. Davis is now widely regarded as the 'godfather' of the run and shoot offense.

== Early life ==
Davis was born in Eastern Washington in Palouse on September 6, 1932. His family later moved to neighboring Oregon and Davis lists Independence, Oregon, as his hometown. Mouse gained his nickname from older brother Don while a freshman shortstop on the Central High School team in neighboring Monmouth, Oregon. Despite his 4 ft 11.5 in (1.511 m) stature at the time, Mouse already excelled at sports. In 1955, he graduated from the Oregon College of Education (now Western Oregon University) in neighboring Monmouth. There he played quarterback and halfback on three straight championship teams from 1952–54 under Coach Bill McArthur. Davis also played basketball and baseball at the college.

== Coaching ==
Davis helped make the run and shoot offense famous as a coach, revolutionizing football in the 1960s and 1970s. In developing his run and shoot offense, Davis espoused the theories of Glenn "Tiger" Ellison, football coach at Middletown High School in Ohio, who wrote the book Run & Shoot Football: Offense of the Future. Davis utilized the offense in a coaching career that included 15 years at the high school level in Oregon, at the college level, and professionally in the NFL, CFL, USFL, WLAF, and Arena League.

=== High school ===
Davis spent 15 seasons coaching high school football in Oregon, culminating in a 1973 state championship at Hillsboro High School. That team went 11–1 and set school marks in seven team season offensive categories and 15 records overall.

=== College ===
Davis then moved on to take the head coaching position at Portland State University, where he coached from 1975 to 1980. He led the PSU football program to a 42–24 record over six seasons, averaging 38 points and nearly 500 yards of offense per game. PSU led the nation in scoring three times. The unique passing game made stars out of Davis' two main quarterbacks, June Jones and Neil Lomax. In 1975, Jones, former Southern Methodist University and University of Hawaiʻi head coach, threw for a Division II record 3,518 yards. Davis' next quarterback, Lomax, set NCAA records of 13,220 yards and 106 touchdowns in 42 games. Under Davis' direction, Portland State set 20 NCAA Division II offensive records.

Davis left Portland State to serve as offensive coordinator at UC Berkeley for the 1981 season. After Cal began the year with a 1–6 record, Davis resigned upon being told that head coach Roger Theder intended to make changes to the offensive scheme.

For the 2004–2006 seasons, Davis served as an assistant coach for Jones at Hawaiʻi. Then in February 2007, he returned to Portland State to serve as offensive coordinator for new PSU head coach Jerry Glanville's staff. He retired at the age of 76 on June 1, 2009, but later returned to the University of Hawaiʻi as an assistant coach on June 25, 2010.

Davis was an inaugural member of the Portland State Athletics Hall of Fame when he was inducted in 1997.

=== Professional ===
Davis has been head coach of the now-defunct USFL's Denver Gold, the WLAF's New York/New Jersey Knights, and the Arena Football League's Detroit Fury and the af2's San Diego Riptide. He was also an assistant coach with the NFL's Atlanta Falcons and Detroit Lions and with the Toronto Argonauts in the Canadian Football League.

In 1982, Davis joined the Toronto Argonauts as offensive coordinator, and instantly turned the team into a contender. Led by his tandem of QBs, Condredge Holloway (Tennessee) and Joe Barnes (Texas Tech), they finished the regular season with a record of 9–6–1. Davis's 1982 Argos lost in the 70th Grey Cup to the Warren Moon-led Edmonton Eskimos, 32–16.

Davis left the Argonauts prior to the 1983 season. The team, however, continued to use the offense he had installed, and finished the regular season with a commanding 12–4 record. They went on to win the 71st Grey Cup, defeating the British Columbia Lions 18–17. It was the Argos' first championship in 31 years.

In 1984, Davis headed back to the US to take the offensive coordinator job with the USFL expansion Houston Gamblers. His quarterback was a rookie from the University of Miami named Jim Kelly. The "Mouseketeers" offensive unit lit up the USFL in their first year of existence passing for 5,793 yards and 45 passing touchdowns, ending their expansion season with a 13–5 record. The Gamblers' offense became the first team in pro football history to have two receivers with over 100 receptions in a single season: Richard Johnson with 115 and Ricky Sanders with 101.

In 1985, Davis took his first head coaching job at the professional level when he took the reins of the Denver Gold, bringing his run-and-shoot offense to the Mile High City. He once again had a tandem of QBs in Vince Evans and Bob Gagliano. The Gold finished the season with an 11–7 mark and their first playoff appearance, but lost in the first round to the Memphis Showboats.

Davis was slated to become head coach of the St. Louis Lightning of the World Indoor Football League in 1988, but the league dissolved before the season began.

Davis was named the head coach of the New York/New Jersey Knights of the WLAF to start the 1991 season. The Knights finished with a record of 5–5, as they won the North American East Division. But they bowed out of the playoffs in the semifinal to the eventual champion London Monarchs. The following year, 1992, saw their record improve to 6–4 and second place in the division, although they missed qualifying for the playoffs.

In 1993, he again joined the Toronto Argonauts as an assistant coach but the team had a disastrous season, finishing 3–15, as the offense was ill-suited to Tracy Ham's talents, and Ham had limited weapons around him.

== Head coaching record ==
=== College ===
Year	Team	Overall	Conference	Standing	Bowl/playoffs
Portland State Vikings (NCAA Division II independent) (1975–1977)
1975	Portland State	8–3			
1976	Portland State	8–3			
1977	Portland State	7–4			
Portland State:		23–10			
Portland State Vikings (NCAA Division I-AA independent) (1978–1980)
1978	Portland State	5–6			
1979	Portland State	6–5			
1980	Portland State	8–3			
Portland State:		19–14			
Total:		42–24			
