= Portland State Vikings football =

American intercollegiate football team

2026 Portland State Vikings football team
- First season: 1947; 79 years ago
- Head coach: Chris Fisk; 1st season, 0–4 (.000)
- Location: Portland, Oregon
- Stadium: Hillsboro Stadium (capacity: 7,600)
- NCAA division: Division I FCS
- Conference: Big Sky
- Colors: Green, white, and silver
- All-time record: 372–439–10 (.459)

Conference championships
- OCC: 1963, 1964 WFC: 1984, 1987, 1988, 1989, 1991, 1992
- Rivalries: Eastern Washington (rivalry); Montana; Idaho State
- Website: goviks.com

The Portland State Vikings football program is the intercollegiate American football team for the Portland State University located in the U.S. state of Oregon. The team competes in the NCAA Division I Football Championship Subdivision (FCS) as a member of the Big Sky Conference. The school's first football team was fielded in 1947. The team plays its home games at the 7,600 seat Hillsboro Stadium. Viking football practice takes place on campus at the Peter W. Stott Field.

== History ==
=== Classifications ===
- 1958–1972: NCAA College Division
- 1973–1977: NCAA Division II
- 1978–1980: NCAA Division I-AA
- 1981–1995: NCAA Division II
- 1996–present: NCAA Division I-AA/FCS

=== Conference affiliations ===
- 1947–1949: Independent
- 1950–1964: Oregon Collegiate Conference
- 1965–1972: NCAA College Division independent
- 1973–1977: NCAA Division II independent
- 1978–1980: NCAA Division I-AA independent
- 1981: NCAA Division II independent
- 1982–1992: Western Football Conference
- 1993–1995: NCAA Division II independent
- 1996–present: Big Sky Conference

== Head coaches ==
Tenure	Coach	Years	Record	Pct.
1947–1954	Joe Holland	8	20–42–3	.331
1955–1956	Ralph Davis	2	4–11–1	.281
1957–1958	Les Leggett	2	6–11–0	.353
1959–1961	Hugh Smithwick	3	6–17–2	.280
1962–1962	Tom DeSylvia	1	4–4	.500
1963–1967	Jerry Lyons	5	21–24–1	.338
1968–1971	Don Read†	4	20–19	.513
1972–1974	Ron Stratten	3	9–24	.273
1975–1980	Mouse Davis	6	42–24	.636
1981–1985	Don Read†	5	19–33–1	.368
1986–1992	Pokey Allen	7	63–26–2	.703
1993–2006	Tim Walsh	14	90–68	.570
2007–2009	Jerry Glanville	3	9–24	.273
2010–2014	Nigel Burton	5	21–36	.368
2015–2025	Bruce Barnum	11	39–75	.342
2026–present	Chris Fisk	1	0–4	.000

† Read's combined statistics: 9 seasons, with a record of 39–52–1 (.429).

== Championships ==
=== Conference championships ===
Year	Coach	Conference	Overall record	Conference record
1963	Jerry Lyons	Oregon Collegiate Conference	6–2–1	5–1
1964†	Jerry Lyons	Oregon Collegiate Conference	7–2	5–1
1984	Don Read	Western Football Conference	8–3	3–0
1987	Pokey Allen	Western Football Conference	11–2–1	4–1–1
1988	Pokey Allen	Western Football Conference	11–3–1	6–0
1989	Pokey Allen	Western Football Conference	9–4	4–1
1991	Pokey Allen	Western Football Conference	11–3	5–0
1992	Pokey Allen	Western Football Conference	9–4	4–1
Conference championships			8	

† Co-champions

== Playoff results ==
=== Division I-AA/FCS ===
The Vikings have appeared in the I-AA/FCS playoffs two times. Their overall record is 0–2.

Year	Round	Opponent	Result
2000	First Round	Delaware	L, 14–49
2015	Second Round	Northern Iowa	L, 17–29

=== Division II ===
The Vikings appeared in the Division II playoffs eight times from 1987 through 1995 with an overall record of 12–8.

Year	Round	Opponent	Result
1987	Quarterfinals; Semifinals; National Championship Game	Minnesota State–Mankato; Northern Michigan; Troy State	W, 27–21; W, 13–7; L, 17–31
1988	First Round; Quarterfinals; Semifinals; National Championship Game	Bowie State; Jacksonville State; Texas A&I; North Dakota State	W, 34–17; W, 20–13; W, 35–27; L, 21–35
1989	First Round; Quarterfinals	West Chester; Indiana (PA)	W, 56–50 ^{3OT} L, 0–17
1991	First Round; Quarterfinals; Semifinals	Northern Colorado; Minnesota State–Mankato; Pittsburg State	W, 27–7; W, 37–27; L, 21–53
1992	First Round; Quarterfinals; Semifinals	UC Davis; Texas A&I; Pittsburg State	W, 42–28; W, 35–30; L, 38–41
1993	First Round	Texas A&M–Kingsville	L, 15–50
1994	First Round; Quarterfinals	Angelo State; Texas A&M–Kingsville	W, 29–0; L, 16–21
1995	First Round; Quarterfinals	East Texas State; Texas A&M–Kingsville	W, 56–35; L, 3–30

== Rivalries ==
=== Eastern Washington ===
Games played	PSU wins	PSU losses	Ties	Win%	First meeting	Last meeting	Next scheduled meeting
46	22	23	1	.489	W 19–13 (1968)	L 35–27 (2025)	November 21, 2026

The Vikings have a rivalry with the Eastern Washington Eagles in all sports, starting in 2010 called The Dam Cup. Eastern Washington won the first rivalry match between the two schools in 2010 with a score of 55–17. The purpose of the Dam Cup is to create a rivalry between Portland State University and Eastern Washington University and provide a sense of pride between alumni in the Portland, OR and Spokane, WA areas. Other goals include increasing attendance at events between both schools and building school spirit among each institutions' student body.

‡ The Dam Cup rivalry with Portland State was officially established in 2010, but both teams have played against each other since the date listed above.

=== Montana ===
Games played	PSU wins	PSU losses	Win%	First meeting	Last meeting	Next scheduled meeting
49	13	36	.265	L 7–33 (1965)	L 17–63 (2024)	November 7, 2026

The Vikings and the Montana Grizzlies have played each other 49 times since the 1965 football season. Coach Bruce Barnum and Griz coach Bobby Hauck have a friendly rivalry based in part on Hershey-owned Dot's Homestyle Pretzels. The 49 matchups are the most games Portland State has played anyone. Montana is one of Portland State's two protected Big Sky Conference rivalries (along with Northern Colorado) when the conference shifted to one division in 2022, meaning they will play every year. The University of Montana leads the all-time series 36–13 as of 2025.

=== Idaho State ===
Games played	PSU wins	PSU losses	Win%	First meeting	Last meeting	Next scheduled meeting
47	20	27	.426	L 7–27 (1965)	W 42–38 (2024)	October 24, 2026

Portland State first joined the Big Sky Conference in 1996, and have played Idaho State a total of 47 times. Before Portland State joined the conference, the two teams competed 21 times in non-conference play, the first being in 1965. In 2011, the Big Sky Conference released its football schedules for the 2012-2015 seasons, which assigned each team two protected opponents that they would play on a yearly basis, with Portland State and Idaho State being assigned to each other.

Ahead of the 2022 season, the protected matchups assigned to each team were changed, with Montana and Northern Colorado now being Portland State's annual guaranteed matchups. As a result, Portland State and Idaho State now play each other twice every three years under the current rotation.

== Individual awards and honors ==
=== Retired numbers ===
Portland State Vikings retired numbers
No.	Name	Position	Career	No. ret.	Ref.
11	Neil Lomax (Note: Lomax had the greatest records of any passer up to his time and statistics that topped all divisions. He led the nation in total offense three times, 1978-1980. He led the nation in passing in 1978 . In a 1980 game against Delaware State, Lomax threw seven touchdown passes in the first quarter. This was on the way to a 105–0 victory. His passing yardage in 1980 was 4,094 in 11 games. That year Lomax finished seventh in the Heisman voting and was most valuable player in the Senior Bowl.)	Quarterback	1977–1980		
18	Peter W. Stott (Note: Peter W. Stott has been an advocate of Portland State Athletics during its growth and development at the Division I level. His contributions to Portland State Athletics, through time, effort, donations, and his outstanding contributions to the Viking program for over 30 years by having the number 18 retired by Viking athletics in his honor.)	—N/a	—N/a	2014	

=== National award winners ===
- STATS FCS Coach of the Year

Bruce Barnum (2015)

=== Conference award winners ===
- Big Sky Conference Coach of the Year

Bruce Barnum (2015)

=== College Football Hall of Fame ===
The Vikings have one player inducted into the College Football Hall of Fame.

Year inducted	Player	Position	Seasons at Portland State
1996	Neil Lomax	Quarterback	1977–1980

== Notable former players ==
Notable alumni include:

- Orshawante Bryant
- Sammie Burroughs
- Kameron Canaday
- Tony Curtis
- Clint Didier
- Tracey Eaton
- Adam Hayward
- Darick Holmes
- James Hundon
- Reggie Jones
- June Jones
- Rich Lewis
- Neil Lomax
- Antonio Narcisse
- Patrick Onwuasor
- Steve Papin
- Ted Popson
- Jordan Senn
- DeShawn Shead
- Jon Shields
- Dave Stief
- Julius Thomas
- Juston Wood
- Randall Woodfield
- Aaron Woods

== Future non-conference opponents ==
Announced schedules as of August 10, 2026.

2026	2027	2028	2029	2030
at San Diego State	at Oregon State	at Stanford	at Oregon	at South Dakota
North Dakota	at Washington			
at Oregon	at Idaho			
