= Oregon Collegiate Conference =

Intercollegiate athletic conference in Oregon from 1950 to 1970

The Oregon Collegiate Conference (also the Oregon Intercollegiate Conference) was an intercollegiate athletic conference that existed from 1950 to 1970. The conference's members were located in the state of Oregon.

== Members ==
- The following is an incomplete list of the membership of the Oregon Collegiate Conference.

Institution	Location	Founded	Nickname	Joined	Left	Conference joined	Current conference
Eastern Oregon College	La Grande, Oregon	1929	Mountaineers	1950	1970	Evergreen	Cascade
George Fox College	Newberg, Oregon	1885	Bruins	1950	1969	Independents	Northwest
Oregon College	Monmouth, Oregon	1856	Wolves	1950	1970	Evergreen	Great Northwest
Oregon Technical Institute	Klamath Falls, Oregon	1947	Owls	1950	1970	Evergreen	Cascade
Portland State College	Portland, Oregon	1946	Vikings	1950	1964	NCAA Independents	Big Sky
Southern Oregon College	Ashland, Oregon	1882	Raiders	1950	1970	Evergreen	Cascade

== Football champions ==
- 1950 – Oregon College
- 1951 – Oregon College
- 1952 – Oregon College
- 1953 – Oregon College
- 1954 – Oregon College and Oregon Tech
- 1955 – Eastern Oregon, Oregon College, Southern Oregon
- 1956 – Eastern Oregon
- 1957 – Southern Oregon
- 1958 – Oregon College
- 1959 – Oregon Tech
- 1960 – Oregon Tech
- 1961 – Southern Oregon
- 1962 – Southern Oregon
- 1963 – Portland State
- 1964 – Portland State and Southern Oregon
- 1965 – Southern Oregon
- 1966 – Oregon College
- 1967 – Oregon College and Southern Oregon
- 1968 – Oregon College
- 1969 – Oregon College

== See also ==
- List of defunct college football conferences
- Evergreen Conference
- Columbia Football League
- Columbia Football Association
