= List of Southern Oregon Raiders head football coaches =

The Southern Oregon Raiders football program is a college football team that represents Southern Oregon University in the Frontier Conference, a part of the National Association of Intercollegiate Athletics (NAIA). The team has had 17 head coaches since its first recorded football game in 1927. The current coach is Berk Brown who first took the position for the 2023 season.

== Key ==
Key to symbols in coaches list
General		Overall		Conference		Postseason (Note: Although the first Rose Bowl Game was played in 1902, it has been continuously played since the 1916 game, and is recognized as the oldest bowl game by the NCAA. "—" indicates any season prior to 1916 when postseason games were not played.)	
No.	Order of coaches (Note: A running total of the number of head coaches, with coaches who served separate tenures being counted only once. Interim head coaches are represented with "Int" and are not counted in the running total. "—" indicates the team played but either without a coach or no coach is on record. "X" indicates an interim year without play.)	GC	Games coached	CW	Conference wins	PW	Postseason wins
DC	Division championships	OW	Overall wins	CL	Conference losses	PL	Postseason losses
CC	Conference championships	OL	Overall losses	CT	Conference ties	PT	Postseason ties
NC	National championships	OT	Overall ties (Note: Overtime rules in college football were introduced in 1996, making ties impossible in the period since.)	C%	Conference winning percentage		
†	Elected to the College Football Hall of Fame	O%	Overall winning percentage (Note: When computing the win–loss percentage, a tie counts as half a win and half a loss.)				

== Coaches ==
No.	Name	Term	GC	OW	OL	OT	O%	CW	CL	CT	C%	PW	PL	CCs	Awards
1	Roy McNeal	1927–1931	27	13	9	5	.574	—	—	—	—	—	—	—	—
2	Howard Hobson	1932–1934	20	12	7	1	.625	—	—	—	—	—	—	—	—
3	Jean Eberhart	1935–1938	24	3	18	3	.188	—	—	—	—	—	—	—	—
4	Al Simpson	1946–1950	44	27	16	1	.625	—	—	—	—	—	—	—	—
5	William Abbey	1951	9	1	8	0	.111	—	—	—	—	—	—	—	—
6	Alex Petersen	1952–1954	22	8	14	0	.364	—	—	—	—	—	—	—	—
7	Al Akins	1955–1969	136	71	62	3	.533	—	—	—	—	—	—	—	—
8	Larry Kramer	1970–1971	20	3	17	0	.150	—	—	—	—	—	—	—	—
9	Scott Johnson	1972–1979	74	35	39	0	.417	—	—	—	—	—	—	—	—
10	Chuck Mills	1980–1988	92	44	47	1	.484	—	—	—	—	—	—	—	—
11	Jim Palazzolo	1989–1995	63	30	31	2	.492	—	—	—	—	—	—	—	—
12	Jeff Olson	1996–2004	86	50	36	0	.581	—	—	—	—	—	—	—	—
13	Shay McClure	2005	10	1	9	0	.100	—	—	—	—	—	—	—	—
14	Steve Helminiak	2006–2010	47	16	31	0	.340	—	—	—	—	—	—	—	—
15	Craig Howard	2011–2017	48	34	14	0	.708	23	7	0	.767	5	2	1	—
16	Charlie Hall	2017–2022	54	28	26	—	.519	26	24	—	.520	2	1	1	—
17	Berk Brown	2023–present	31	17	14	—	.548	12	10	—	.545	0	0	0	—
