= Southern Oregon Raiders football, 2000–2009 =

American college football seasons

The Southern Oregon Raiders football program, 2000–2009 represented Southern Oregon University during the 2000s in college football as an NAIA independent at the National Association of Intercollegiate Athletics (NAIA) level.

== 2006 ==
2006 Southern Oregon Raiders football
- Conference: Independent
- Record: 2–7
- Head coach: Steve Helminiak (1st season)
- Home stadium: Raider Stadium

2006 NAIA independents football records
	Conf.			Overall
Team	W		L	W		L
Webber International		–		5	–	5
Langston		–		5	–	4
Southern Oregon		–		3	–	6
Azusa Pacific		–		3	–	7
Paul Quinn		–		2	–	6
Southern Virginia *		–		2	–	7
SAGU		–		2	–	8
Waldorf		–		2	–	8
Haskell		–		2	–	9
Seton Hill		–		2	–	9
Edward Waters		–		1	–	9
* – Southern Virginia later forfeited a win.

The 2006 Southern Oregon Raiders football team represented the Southern Oregon University an independent during the 2006 NAIA football season. Led by first-year head coach Steve Helminiak, the Raiders compiled a record of 2–7. Southern Oregon played home games at Raider Stadium in Ashland, Oregon.

=== Schedule ===
Date	Opponent	Site	Result
September 2	Eastern Oregon	Ashland, OR	L 3–9
September 9	at Menlo	Atherton, CA	L 16–13 (forfeit)
September 23	Western Oregon	Ashland, OR	L 0–38
September 30	at Humboldt State	Redwood Bowl; Arcata, CA	L 13–30
October 7	Azusa Pacific	Ashland, OR	W 57–7
October 14	Linfield^{†}	Ashland, OR	L 29–37
October 21	at Western Oregon	Monmouth, OR	L 7–53
November 4	Humboldt State	Ashland, OR	L 17–35
November 11	at Dixie State (UT)	St. George, UT	W 18–15
^{†}Homecoming

== 2007 ==
2007 Southern Oregon Raiders football
- Conference: Independent
- Record: 5–4
- Head coach: Steve Helminiak (2nd season)
- Home stadium: Raider Stadium

2007 NAIA independents football records
	Conf.			Overall
Team	W		L	W		L
Southern Oregon		–		5	–	4
No. 21 Azusa Pacific		–		6	–	5
Peru State		–		6	–	5
Edward Waters		–		5	–	6
Southern Virginia		–		4	–	5
Webber International		–		3	–	6
Haskell		–		2	–	8
Waldorf		–		2	–	9
SAGU		–		1	–	9
Faulkner		–		0	–	9
Rankings from NAIA Coaches' Poll

The 2007 Southern Oregon Raiders football team represented the Southern Oregon University an independent during the 2007 NAIA football season. Led by second-year head coach Steve Helminiak, the Raiders compiled a record of 5–4. Southern Oregon played home games at Raider Stadium in Ashland, Oregon.

=== Schedule ===
Date	Time	Opponent	Site	Result	Attendance	Source
August 25		Montana Tech	Raider Stadium; Ashland, OR	L 30–32	1,000	
September 1		at Eastern Oregon	La Grande, OR	W 48–45 ^{4OT}		
September 8	2:00 p.m.	at Idaho State	Holt Arena; Pocatello, ID	L 11–37	6,036	
September 22	6:00 p.m.	at Willamette	McCulloch Stadium; Salem, OR	W 34–27		
October 6	6:00 p.m.	Azusa Pacific	Azusa, CA	W 14–13	2,122	
October 13	6:00 p.m.	Linfield^{†}	Raider Stadium; Ashland, OR	L 22–30		
October 20		at Western Oregon	McArthur Field; Monmouth, OR	L 13–37	2,100	
November 3	6:00 p.m.	at Humboldt State	Redwood Bowl; Arcata, CA	W 31–16	1,624	
November 10	1:00 p.m.	Dixie State (UT)	Ashland, OR	W 42–9		
^{†}Homecoming; All times are in Pacific time

== 2008 ==
2008 Southern Oregon Raiders football
- Conference: Independent
- Record: 3–7
- Head coach: Steve Helminiak (3rd season)
- Home stadium: Raider Stadium

2008 NAIA independents football records
	Conf.			Overall
Team	W		L	W		L
SAGU		–		4	–	5
Peru State		–		4	–	6
Southern Oregon		–		3	–	7
Southern Virginia		–		3	–	8
Webber International		–		3	–	8
Azusa Pacific		–		2	–	8
Edward Waters		–		2	–	8
Grand View		–		2	–	8
Haskell		–		2	–	9
Kentucky Christian		–		1	–	9
Waldorf		–		1	–	10

The 2008 Southern Oregon Raiders football team represented the Southern Oregon University an independent during the 2008 NAIA football season. Led by third-year head coach Steve Helminiak, the Raiders compiled a record of 3–7. Southern Oregon played home games at Raider Stadium in Ashland, Oregon.

=== Schedule ===
Date	Time	Opponent	Site	Result	Attendance
August 28	6:00 p.m.	at No. 21 Montana Tech	Alumni Coliseum; Butte, MT	W 30–25	2,283
September 6	6:00 p.m.	Humboldt State	Raider Stadium; Ashland, OR	L 14–15	1,037
September 13	2:00 p.m.	at Sacramento State	Hornet Stadium; Sacramento, CA	L 16–27	6,603
September 20	3:00 p.m.	at Willamette	McCulloch Stadium; Salem, OR	L 23–31	2,161
September 27	6:00 p.m.	at Linfield	Maxwell Field; McMinnville, OR	L 7–14 ^{OT}	
October 11	2:00 p.m.	Western Oregon	Raider Stadium; Ashland, OR	L 3–35	896
October 18	1:00 p.m.	Azusa Pacific	Raider Stadium; Ashland, OR	W 16–14	
October 25	1:00 p.m.	No. 3 (D-III) Mary Hardin–Baylor	Raider Stadium; Ashland, OR	W 40–28	1,139
November 8	12:00 p.m.	at South Dakota	DakotaDome; Vermillion, SD	L 0–37	5,615
November 15	12:00 p.m.	at Eastern Oregon	Community Stadium; La Grande, OR	L 10–27	746
Rankings from NAIA Poll released prior to the game; All times are in Pacific time

=== Preseason ===
June 3 - 12 players from the upcoming 2008 Raiders' team were named to the NAIA All-Independent Pre-season football team. Six of which were named to the first team: Darryl Price, Brian Harding, Jordan Meyers, Anthony Scolamieri, Danson Cappo and Steve Palmer. The players named to the second team were Bryan Lee-Lauduski, Trent Henson, Will Watson, Ben Baker, Damario Watson and Corey O’Neil. A total of ten teams comprise the All-Independent team: Southern Oregon University, Azusa Pacific University, Southern Virginia University, Edward Waters College, Webber International University, Waldorf College, Southwestern Assemblies of God University, Haskell Indian Nations University, Peru State College and Kentucky Christian University.

=== During the season ===
September 2 - Two Southern Oregon players, QB Brian Lee-Lauduski and SS Jason Young, chosen as the offensive and defensive players of the week for their performances against Montana Tech.

September 8 - Senior Defensive End Anthony Scolamieri was chosen as the NAIA Independent Defensive Player of the Week for his performance against Humboldt State.

September 15 - Senior Punter Steve Palmer was named the NAIA Independent Special Teams Player of the Week for his performance against Sacramento State. Palmer had an 81-yard punt which ranks as the second longest is school history.

September 23 - Senior RB Marlon Rosales was chosen as the NAIA Independent Offensive Player of the Week for his performance against Willamette.

==== Offense ====
Rushing

Name	GP	Att	Gain	Loss	Net	Avg	TD	Long	Avg/G
Marlon Rosales	2	39	118	6	112	2.9	1	14	56.0
Marquis Malcom	1	8	29	0	29	3.6	0	9	29.0
TEAM	2	1	3	3	0	0.0	0	0	0.0
Bryan Lee-Lauduski	2	5	7	20	-13	-2.6	0	2	-6.5
Total	2	53	157	29	128	2.4	1	14	64.0
Opponents	2	72	358	66	292	4.1	4	39	146.0

Passing

Name	GP	Effic	Att-Cmp-Int	Pct	Yds	TD	Lng	Avg/G
Bryan Lee-Lauduski	2	124.06	88-57-5	64.8	583	4	42	291.5
Total	2	124.06	88-57-5	64.8	583	4	42	291.5
Opponents	2	82.47	60-31-4	51.7	276	1	46	138.0

Receiving

Name	GP-GS	No.	Yds	Avg	TD	Long	Avg/G
Darryl Price	2	17	221	13.0	1	32	110.5
Danny Patenaude	2	17	112	6.6	0	22	56.0
Vance Beach	2	6	71	11.8	0	26	35.5
Brandon Stout	2	5	91	18.2	3	42	45.5
Brian Harding	2	5	66	13.2	1	19	33.0
Drew Dukeshire	1	3	14	4.7	0	11	14.0
Marlon Rosales	2	2	11	5.5	0	8	5.5
Steve Jorgensen	2	1	11	11.0	0	11	5.5
Total	2	56	597	10.7	5	42	298.5
Opponents	2	31	276	8.9	1	46	138.0

==== Defense ====
Name	GP	Tackles				Sacks	Pass defense		Interceptions				Fumbles		Blkd Kick
Name	GP	Solo	Ast	Total	TFL-Yds	No-Yds	BrUp	QBH	No.-Yds	Avg	TD	Long	Rcv-Yds	FF	Blkd Kick
Total															

==== Special teams ====
Name	Punting								Kickoffs				
Name	No.	Yds	Avg	Long	TB	FC	I20	Blkd	No.	Yds	Avg	TB	OB
Total													

Name	Punt returns					Kick returns				
Name	No.	Yds	Avg	TD	Long	No.	Yds	Avg	TD	Long
Vance Beach						6	122	20.3	0	29
Byron Sconiers						2	34	17.0	0	24
Brandon Stout	4	22	5.5	0	15	2	42	21.0	0	23
Total	4	22	5.5	0	15	10	198	19.8	0	29
Opponents	7	40	5.7	0	18	10	151	15.1	0	33

== 2009 ==
2009 Southern Oregon Raiders football
- Conference: Independent
- Record: 2–7
- Head coach: Steve Helminiak (4th season)
- Home stadium: Raider Stadium

2009 NAIA independents football records
	Conf.			Overall
Team	W		L	W		L
No. 24 Ohio Dominican		–		7	–	3
Peru State		–		7	–	4
Webber International		–		4	–	6
Haskell		–		3	–	7
Azusa Pacific		–		3	–	8
Southern Oregon		–		2	–	7
Southern Virginia		–		0	–	8
Edward Waters		–		0	–	10
Rankings from NAIA Coaches' Poll

The 2009 Southern Oregon Raiders football team represented the Southern Oregon University an independent during the 2009 NAIA football season. Led by fourth-year head coach Steve Helminiak, the Raiders compiled a record of 2–7. Southern Oregon played home games at Raider Stadium in Ashland, Oregon.

=== Schedule ===
Date	Time	Opponent	Site	Result	Attendance
August 29	1:00 p.m.	Eastern Oregon	Raider Stadium; Ashland, OR	W 32–28	
September 12	1:05 p.m.	at Portland State	PGE Park; Portland, OR	L 10–34	13,498
September 19	3:00 p.m.	Willamette	Raider Stadium; Ashland, OR	L 15–22	831
September 26	6:00 p.m.	Linfield	Raider Stadium; Ashland, OR	L 21–37	2,437
October 3	2:00 p.m.	at Western Oregon	McArthur Field; Monmouth, OR	L 0–23	2,200
October 10	6:00 p.m.	at Azusa Pacific	Cougar Athletic Stadium; Azusa, CA	W 20–13	1,432
October 17	6:00 p.m.	at Humboldt State	Redwood Bowl; Arcata, CA	L 3–34	4,211
October 24	11:00 a.m.	at Mary Hardin–Baylor	Tiger Field; Belton, TX	L 0–21	2,676
November 7	2:00 p.m.	at North Dakota	Alerus Center; Grand Forks, ND	L 24–30	7,253
All times are in Pacific time
