= Helminiak =

Helminiak is a surname. Notable people with the surname include:

- Clare Helminiak (fl. from 1982), American physician
- Daniel A. Helminiak (born 1942), American Roman Catholic priest, theologian, and writer
- Steve Helminiak (fl. from 1990), American football coach
