= Jeff Olson =

Jeff Olson may refer to:

- Jeff Olson (alpine skier) (born 1966), American Olympic alpine skier
- Jeff Olson (American football), American football coach, former head coach at Southern Oregon University
- Jeff Olson (musician) (born 1962), American drummer
- Jeff Olson (singer), the cowboy in the musical group Village People
- Jeff Olson (visual effects artist) (1948/49–2026), American visual effects artist
- Geoffrey Olsen (1943–2007), Welsh artist
