= 2014 Southern Oregon Raiders football team =

American college football season

2014 Southern Oregon Raiders football

NAIA national champion

NAIA National Championship Game, W 55–31 vs. Marian (IN)
- Conference: Frontier Conference
- Record: 13–2 (8–2 Frontier)
- Head coach: Craig Howard (4th season)
- Offensive coordinator: Chris Fisk (4th season)
- Defensive coordinator: Berk Brown (3rd season)
- Home stadium: Phillips Field; Raider Stadium

2014 Frontier Conference football standings
	Conf.			Overall
Team	W		L	W		L
No. 5 Carroll (MT) $^	9	–	1	10	–	2
No. 1 Southern Oregon ^	8	–	2	13	–	2
No. 15 Eastern Oregon	7	–	3	8	–	3
Montana Western	6	–	4	6	–	5
Rocky Mountain	4	–	6	5	–	6
College of Idaho	3	–	7	4	–	7
Montana State–Northern	2	–	8	3	–	8
Montana Tech	1	–	9	1	–	9
$ – Conference champion; ^ – NAIA playoff participant; Rankings from NAIA Coaches' Poll

The 2014 Southern Oregon Raiders football team was an American football team that represented Southern Oregon University as a member of the Frontier Conference during the 2014 NAIA football season. In their fourth season under head coach Craig Howard, the Raiders compiled a 13–2 record (8–2 against conference opponents) and won the NAIA national championship, defeating Marian (Indiana), 55–31, in the NAIA National Championship Game.

The team's statistical leaders included receiver Dylan Young who led the NAIA with 1,631 receiving yards.

The team played its home games at Phillips Field (Ashland High School) and at Raider Stadium, both in Ashland, Oregon.

== Schedule ==
Date	Opponent	Rank	Site	Result	Attendance	Source
August 30	at Menlo*	No. 22	Connor Field; Atherton, CA	W 51–14	700	
September 6	No. 2 Carroll (MT)	No. 22	Phillips Field at Ashland High School; Ashland, OR	W 38–35	2,500	
September 13	at Eastern Oregon	No. 22	Community Stadium; La Grande, OR	W 35–31		
September 20	College of Idaho	No. 9	Phillips Field at Ashland High School; Ashland, OR	W 56–28	2,000	
September 27	at MSU Northern	No. 7	Blue Pony Stadium; Havre, MT	W 45–24	700	
October 11	Montana Western	No. 5	Raider Stadium; Ashland, OR	W 31–6	2,350	
October 18	at No. 3 Carroll (MT)	No. 4	Nelson Stadium; Helena, MT	L 40–42	5,700	
October 25	at College of Idaho	No. 7	Simplot Stadium; Caldwell, ID	W 66–16	3,126	
November 1	Rocky Mountain	No. T–5	Raider Stadium; Ashland, OR	W 45–28	2,400	
November 8	at Montana Tech	No. 5	Alumni Coliseum; Butte, MT	W 45–33		
November 15	No. 16 Eastern Oregon	No. 4	Raider Stadium; Ashland, OR	L 27–31	2,940	
November 22	No. 9 MidAmerica Nazarene*	No. 8	Raider Stadium; Ashland, OR (NAIA First Round)	W 44–26	2,425	
November 29	at No. 1 Carroll (MT)*	No. 8	Nelson Stadium; Helena, MT (NAIA Quarterfinal)	W 45–42	3,700	
December 6	at No. 3 Saint Xavier (IL)*	No. 8	Deaton Field; Chicago, IL (NAIA Semifinal)	W 62–37		
December 19	vs. No. 7 Marian (IN)*	No. 8	Daytona Beach Municipal Stadium; Daytona Beach, FL (NAIA Championship Game)	W 55–31	1,941	
*Non-conference game; Rankings from NAIA Poll released prior to the game
