= Zack Moore =

Zack Moore may refer to:

- Zack Moore (American football), American football coach and player
- Zack Moore (basketball), Japanese-American basketball player

== See also ==
- Zach Moore, American football defensive end
