= Southern Oregon Normal football, 1927–1938 =

American college football seasons

The Southern Oregon Normal football program from 1927 to 1938 represented Southern Oregon Normal School (SONS)—now known as Southern Oregon University—during its first 12 years of college football competition. Southern Oregon joined the California Coast Conference (CCC) in 1929, but withdrew after one season. The school did not field a football from 1939 to 1945.

== 1927 ==
1927 Southern Oregon Normal football
- Conference: Independent
- Record: 3–0
- Head coach: Roy McNeal (1st season)

=== Schedule ===
Date	Opponent	Site	Result	Source
November 5	Albany (OR)	Ashland, OR	W 21–0	
November 12	Humboldt State	Ashland, OR	W 29–0	
November 19	Oregon Normal	Ashland, OR	W 19–12	

== 1928 ==
1928 Southern Oregon Normal football
- Conference: Independent
- Record: 1–3–1
- Head coach: Roy McNeal (2nd season)

=== Schedule ===
Date	Opponent	Site	Result	Source
October 12	Oregon State freshman	Ashland, OR	L 0–6	
October 27	Oregon freshman	Ashland, OR	T 0–0	
November 3	at Chico State	Chico, CA	L 9–38	
November 11	at Humboldt State	Eureka, CA	W 31–12	
November 17	Oregon Normal	Ashland, OR	L 0–12	

== 1929 ==
1929 Southern Oregon Normal football
- Conference: California Coast Conference
- Record: 2–4–1 (0–4 CCC)
- Head coach: Roy McNeal (3rd season)

1929 California Coast Conference football standings
	Conf.					Overall
Team	W		L		T	W		L		T
Sacramento $	4	–	0	–	0	?	–	?	–	?
San Mateo	4	–	1	–	0	?	–	?	–	?
Menlo	4	–	1	–	0	?	–	?	–	?
Marin	3	–	2	–	0	?	–	?	–	?
Modesto	2	–	4	–	0	?	–	?	–	?
Cal Poly	0	–	2	–	0	3	–	5	–	0
Santa Rosa	0	–	3	–	0	?	–	?	–	?
Southern Oregon Normal	0	–	4	–	0	2	–	4	–	1
$ – Conference champion

=== Schedule ===
Date	Opponent	Site	Result	Source
October 19	Menlo	Ashland, OR	L 12–20	
October 26	Marin	Ashland, OR	L 6–19	
November 2	at Oregon Normal*	Monmouth, OR	T 0–0	
November 9	at Sacramento	Sacramento, CA	L 7–62	
November 15	Chico State*	Ashland, OR	W 20–7	
November 23	Humboldt State*	Ashland, OR	W 27–7	
November 30	Modesto	Ashland, OR	L 12–18	
*Non-conference game

== 1930 ==
1930 Southern Oregon Normal football
- Conference: Independent
- Record: 4–2
- Head coach: Roy McNeal (4th season)

=== Schedule ===
Date	Opponent	Site	Result	Source
October 10	at Humboldt State	Eureka, CA	W 19–7	
October 25	Oregon State freshmen	Ashland, OR	L 0–13	
November 1	at Eastern Oregon	La Grande, OR	W 14–0	
November 8	Oregon freshmen	Ashland, OR	W 26–6	
November 15	at Chico State	Chico, CA	L 0–7	
November 22	Albany (OR)	Ashland, OR	W 34–13	

== 1931 ==
1931 Southern Oregon Normal football
- Conference: Independent
- Record: 2–0–2
- Head coach: Roy McNeal (5th season)

=== Schedule ===
Date	Opponent	Site	Result
October	Humboldt State	Ashland, OR	W 9–7
October 15	at Albany (OR)	Albany, OR	T 0–0
October 31	Eastern Oregon^{†}	Ashland, OR	T 0–0
November 11	at Chico State	Chico, CA	W 20–0
^{†}Homecoming

== 1932 ==
1932 Southern Oregon Normal football
- Conference: Independent
- Record: 4–1–1
- Head coach: Howard Hobson (1st season)

=== Schedule ===
Date	Opponent	Site	Result	Source
October 1	Cal Aggies	Ashland, OR	T 12–12	
October 22	Pacific (OR)	Ashland, OR	W 20–0	
October 21	at Humboldt State	Arcata, CA	W 25–0	
October 29	at Eastern Oregon	La Grande, OR	W 30–0	
November 11	Chico State^{†}	Ashland, OR	W 14–7	
November 19	at Oregon Normal	Monmouth, OR	L 6–20	
^{†}Homecoming

== 1933 ==
1933 Southern Oregon Normal football
- Conference: Independent
- Record: 6–2
- Head coach: Howard Hobson (2nd season)

=== Schedule ===
Date	Opponent	Site	Result
September 30	Oregon State JV	Ashland, OR	L 0–21
October 7	Pacific (OR)	Ashland, OR	W 19–0
October 14	at Oregon Normal	Monmouth, OR	W 12–7
October 21	Oregon State JV	Ashland, OR	W 39–0
October 28	Marin	Ashland, OR	W 19–0
November 4	Oregon freshmen		W 7–0
November 11	at Willamette	Salem, OR	L 0–13
November 18	Eastern Oregon^{†}	Ashland, OR	W 7–0
^{†}Homecoming

== 1934 ==
1934 Southern Oregon Normal football
- Conference: Independent
- Record: 2–4
- Head coach: Howard Hobson (3rd season)

=== Schedule ===
Date	Opponent	Site	Result	Source
October 6	Pacific (OR)	Ashland, OR	L 0–7	
October 13	at Oregon State freshmen	Corvallis, OR	L 0–13	
October 20	at Oregon freshmen	Eugene, OR	W 7–0	
October 27	vs. Linfield	Roseburg, OR	L 7–14	
November 3	at Oregon Normal	Monmouth, OR	L 6–7	
November 10	Chico State^{†}	Ashland, OR	W 6–0	
^{†}Homecoming

== 1935 ==
1935 Southern Oregon Normal football
- Conference: Independent
- Record: 1–6
- Head coach: Jean Eberhart (1st season)

=== Schedule ===
Date	Opponent	Site	Result	Source
September 29	at Pacific (OR)	Forest Grove, OR	L 0–6	
October 5	Oregon State freshmen	Ashland, OR	L 0–20	
October 12	Oregon freshmen	Ashland, OR	L 12–13	
October 19	Albany (OR)^{†}	Ashland, OR	W 14–0	
October 26	at Linfield	McMinnville, OR	L 0–27	
November 3	at Oregon Normal	Monmouth, OR	L 6–12	
November 16	at Chico State	Chico, CA	L 7–21	
^{†}Homecoming

== 1936 ==
1936 Southern Oregon Normal football
- Conference: Independent
- Record: 3–2–1
- Head coach: Jean Eberhart (2nd season)

=== Schedule ===
Date	Opponent	Site	Result	Source
October 3	Pacific (OR)	Ashland, OR	W 52–0	
October 10	Oregon freshmen	Ashland, OR	W 6–2	
October 16	vs. Oregon State freshmen	Klamath Falls, OR	T 13–13	
October 24	at Albany (OR)	Albany, OR	W 21–0	
October 30	Humboldt State	Ashland, OR	L 3–40	
November 7	Oregon Normal^{†}	Ashland, OR	L 0–7	
^{†}Homecoming

== 1937 ==
1937 Southern Oregon Normal football
- Conference: Independent
- Record: 0–4–2
- Head coach: Jean Eberhart (3rd season)

=== Schedule ===
Date	Opponent	Site	Result	Source
October 2	Albany (OR)	Medford, OR	T 6–6	
October 9	at Humboldt State	Arcata, CA	L 0–34	
October 16	vs. Oregon freshmen	North Bend, OR	L 0–21	
October 30	Oregon Normal^{†}	Ashland, OR	L 0–12	
November 6	Oregon State Freshmen	Medford, OR	L 12-14	
November 13	at Chico State	Chico, CA	T 6–6	
^{†}Homecoming

== 1938 ==
1938 Southern Oregon Normal football
- Conference: Independent
- Record: 0–5
- Head coach: Jean Eberhart (4th season)

=== Schedule ===
Date	Time	Opponent	Site	Result	Attendance	Source
October 1	8:30 p.m.	at Humboldt State	Albee Stadium; Eureka, CA	L 7–18	2,000	
October 7		vs. Oregon freshman	Grants Pass, OR	L 13–26		
October 21	8:00 p.m.	at Oregon Normal	Dallas, OR	L 6–19		
October 28	8:00 p.m.	Oregon Normal^{†}	Ashland, OR	L 0–6		
November 5		Chico State	Ashland, OR	L 0–14		
^{†}Homecoming; All times are in Pacific time
