= Kellan Quick =

American gridiron football player (born 1983)

Profile
- Position: Cornerback

Personal information
- Born: November 11, 1983 (age 42); Nampa, Idaho
- Listed height: 6 ft 1 in (1.85 m)
- Listed weight: 185 lb (84 kg)

Career information
- College: Southern Oregon
- NFL draft: 2007: undrafted

Career history
- Toronto Argonauts (2007–2008)*
- * Offseason or practice squad member only

Kellan Quick (born November 11, 1983) is a former professional gridiron football cornerback. He was signed by the Toronto Argonauts as an undrafted free agent in 2007. He played college football for Southern Oregon University.

== Education ==
Quick played football and golf at Skyview High School in Nampa, Idaho. He considered dropping the former sport in his sophomore year after the Idaho High School Activities Association announced plans to move golf from the spring semester to fall. He played for the Southern Oregon Raiders from 2002 to 2006. He majored in Business Communication.

== Professional career ==
After going undrafted in the 2007 NFL draft, Quick was signed to the Toronto Argonauts on May 25, 2007, and was assigned to the practice squad on June 24, 2007. He spent the entire 2007 CFL season on the practice squad and was re-signed on January 23, 2008. He was released later before the 2008 season commenced.
