= 2007 Humboldt State Lumberjacks football team =

American college football season

2007 Humboldt State Lumberjacks football
- Conference: Independent
- Record: 2–8
- Head coach: Doug Adkins (8th season)
- Defensive coordinator: Shay McClure (2nd season)
- Home stadium: Redwood Bowl

2007 NCAA Division II Northwest Region independents football records
	Conf.			Overall
Team	W		L	W		L
Western Oregon #		–		9	–	2
Dixie State @		–		3	–	8
Humboldt State		–		2	–	8
@ – Provisional NCAA Division II member # – Dixie Rotary Bowl participant

The 2007 Humboldt State Lumberjacks football team represented Humboldt State University—now known as California State Polytechnic University, Humboldt—as an independent during the 2007 NCAA Division II football season. Led by Doug Adkins in his eighth and final season as head coach, the Lumberjacks compiled a record of 2–8. The team was outscored by its opponents 321 to 141 for the season. Humboldt State played home games at the Redwood Bowl in Arcata, California.

The Great Northwest Athletic Conference (GNAC) did not sponsor football for the 2006 and 2007 seasons. Adkins finished his eight-year tenure as head coach of Lumberjacks with a record of 33–51, (.393). Humboldt State had only one winning season, in 2006, during those eight years.

== Schedule ==
Date	Time	Opponent	Site	Result	Attendance	Source
August 23		at No. 3 North Dakota	Alerus Center; Grand Forks, ND	L 0–59		
September 1		at Mesa State	Ralph Stocker Stadium; Grand Junction, CO	L 21–23	1,542	
September 8		at Central Washington	Tomlinson Stadium; Ellensburg, WA	L 0–44	1,932	
September 22		at Menlo	Connor Field; Atherton, CA	W 44–7		
September 29		Dixie State	Redwood Bowl; Arcata, CA	W 30–22		
October 6		Western Oregon	Redwood Bowl; Arcata, CA	L 3–27	2,213	
October 13		Azusa Pacific^{†}	Redwood Bowl; Arcata, CA	L 17–27	4,283	
October 20		at Dixie State	Hansen Stadium; St. George, UT	L 10–17	2,862	
November 3	6:00 p.m.	Southern Oregon	Redwood Bowl; Arcata, CA	L 16–31	1,624	
November 10		at Western Oregon	McArthur Field; Monmouth, OR	L 0–64	2,500	
^{†}Homecoming; Rankings from AFCA Poll released prior to the game; All times are in Pacific time
