= 2014 college football season =

The 2014 college football season may refer to:

== American leagues ==
- 2014 NCAA Division I FBS football season
- 2014 NCAA Division I FCS football season
- 2014 NCAA Division II football season
- 2014 NCAA Division III football season
- 2014 NAIA football season

== Non-American leagues ==
- 2014 Japan college football season
- 2014 CIS football season
