= Dante Olson =

American gridiron football player (born 1997)

No. 59
- Position: Linebacker

Personal information
- Born: January 6, 1997 (age 29); Medford, Oregon, U.S.
- Listed height: 6 ft 3 in (1.91 m)
- Listed weight: 240 lb (109 kg)

Career information
- High school: Cascade Christian (Medford, Oregon)
- College: Montana
- NFL draft: 2020: undrafted

Career history
- Philadelphia Eagles (2020)*; Edmonton Elks (2021)*
- * Offseason or practice squad member only

Awards and highlights
- Buck Buchanan Award (2019)
- Stats at Pro Football Reference

Dante Olson (born January 6, 1997) is an American former football linebacker. He played college football at Montana.

== Early life ==
Olson first began playing football in second grade, primarily playing right tackle on the offensive line and sometimes played fullback. He was bullied in middle school for being overweight, and developed an eating disorder, was diagnosed with depression and anxiety, and contemplated suicide. As a freshman at Cascade Christian High School, Olson was cut from the football team. He tried out for the basketball, baseball and tennis teams. By his senior year, he was three-time captain on the football team and helped lead Cascade Christian to a state championship. He posted 135 tackles, including 11 for loss, three interceptions, seven passes defensed, one sack, one forced fumble and a defensive touchdown. Olson committed to Montana over an offer from Cal Poly.

== College career ==
Olson redshirted his freshman season and mainly played on the scout team and special teams. He earned Montana's special teams player of the year as a sophomore. He became a starter on defense in 2018 and he made 151 tackles, earning seven All-American honors and finished third in voting for the FCS defensive player of the award. Olson started 25 of 47 games at Montana and as a senior, Olson set the Big Sky Conference's single season record for tackles with 179 and made 26 tackles for loss, 11.5 sacks, three interceptions, five forced fumbles and one fumble recovery. He had 14 tackles against Oregon. He received the 2019 Buck Buchanan Award for the top defensive player in the FCS, earned the FCS Athletic Directors Association Defensive Player of the Year honors, and was a consensus All-American. Olson set Montana's all-time tackling record with 397. He earned a degree in business management with a 3.91 grade-point average and was one of 12 finalists for the William V. Campbell Trophy. Olson participated in the East-West Shrine game and Montana head coach Bobby Hauck called Olson "one of my favorite guys all-time." At the NFL Combine, he posted a 42-inch vertical jump, one of the best for a linebacker, but his 4.88-second 40-yard dash was considered to hurt his draft stock.

== Professional career ==
=== Philadelphia Eagles ===
After going undrafted in the 2020 NFL draft, Olson signed an undrafted free agent deal with the Philadelphia Eagles. Olson was waived on August 26, 2020. He was re-signed to their practice squad on October 8, 2020. He was released on November 2.

=== Edmonton Elks ===
Olson signed with the Edmonton Elks of the CFL on March 31, 2021. He retired from football on June 24, 2021.

== Personal life ==
Olson is the son of Linda Natali Olson and former Southern Oregon football coach Jeff Olson. He has an older sister and his older brother played wide receiver at SOU. Olson is a Christian. He served as a pen-pal for third grade children at Gerber Elementary School in Gerber, California encouraging them to attend college and finally met them in September 2019.
