= Dusty McGrorty =

American football player (born 1981)

No. 36
- Position: Running back

Personal information
- Born: May 9, 1981 (age 45); Seaside, Oregon, U.S.
- Listed height: 5 ft 10 in (1.78 m)
- Listed weight: 218 lb (99 kg)

Career information
- High school: Warrenton (Warrenton, Oregon)
- College: Southern Oregon (2000–2003)
- NFL draft: 2004: undrafted

Career history
- St. Louis Rams (2004–2005)

Awards and highlights
- Third-team Little All-American (2003); 2× First-team NAIA All-American (2002, 2003)

Career NFL statistics
- Games played: 1
- Stats at Pro Football Reference

Dustin "Dusty" Scott McGrorty (born May 9, 1981) is an American former professional football running back who played in the National Football League (NFL) for the St. Louis Rams. He played college football for the Southern Oregon Raiders.

== Early life ==
McGrorty was born on May 9, 1981, in Seaside, Oregon. He attended Warrenton High School in Warrenton, Oregon. As a senior, McGrorty was named Offensive and Defensive player of the year in Class 2A, after he rushed for 2,594 yards and had 40 touchdowns.

== College career ==
McGrorty played college football for the Southern Oregon Raiders from 2000 to 2003. He had 5,414 rushing yards and 79 total touchdowns. McGrorty earned NAIA All-American honors in 2002 and 2003. In 2003, he was also named to the third-team AP Little All-America team.

== Professional career ==
Pre-draft measurables
Height	Weight	40-yard dash	20-yard shuttle	Vertical jump	Broad jump	Bench press
5 ft 11 in (1.80 m)	255 lb (116 kg)	4.63 s	4.30 s	31 in (0.79 m)	9 ft 8 in (2.95 m)	25 reps
All values from Pro day

After going undrafted in the 2004 NFL draft, McGrorty signed with the St. Louis Rams as an undrafted free agent. On September 5, he was released and signed to the practice squad. On October 22, McGrorty was elevated to the active and made his NFL debut on October 24 against the Miami Dolphins. After the game he was released and re-signed to the practice squad. On January 19, 2005, McGrorty signed a reserve/futures contract with the team. On September 3, he was released.
