= Colin Branch =

American football player (born 1980)

No. 28
- Position: Safety

Personal information
- Born: March 2, 1980 (age 46); Cincinnati, Ohio, U.S.
- Listed height: 6 ft 0 in (1.83 m)
- Listed weight: 203 lb (92 kg)

Career information
- High school: Carlsbad (CA)
- College: Stanford
- NFL draft: 2003: 4th round, 119th overall pick

Career history
- Carolina Panthers (2003–2006); Oakland Raiders (2007)*
- * Offseason or practice squad member only

Career NFL statistics
- Tackles: 86
- Interceptions: 4
- Passes defended: 9
- Stats at Pro Football Reference

Colin Leander Branch (born August 30, 1980) is an American former professional football player who was a safety in the National Football League (NFL). He was selected in the fourth round of the 2003 NFL draft by the Carolina Panthers. He played college football at Stanford.

== Early life ==
Branch graduated from Carlsbad High School in 1998.

== College career ==
Branch played college football at Stanford. As a senior in 2002, he was named Honorable Mention All-Pac-10 after compiling 69 tackles.

== Professional career ==
=== Carolina Panthers ===
Branch was selected in the fourth round with the 119th pick of the 2003 NFL draft by the Carolina Panthers. In 2004, Branch had 55 tackles and three interceptions for the Panthers, while starting 15 games. During the 2005 season, he suffered a knee injury, missing the season. Branch made 19 tackles and one interception in 2006, with four starts.

=== Oakland Raiders ===
Branch signed with the Oakland Raiders on June 8, 2007. He was released by them on August 27, 2007.

== Personal life ==
Branch is currently married to the former April Sage of North Charleston, South Carolina and they have four children together, sons Kendrick, Aaron and Salem Calvin (named after Colin's father, Calvin Stanley Branch, and brother Calvin Stanley Branch Jr.), and daughter Sage.
