= 2014 NAIA football rankings =

One human poll makes up the 2014 National Association of Intercollegiate Athletics (NAIA) football rankings, sometimes called the NAIA Coaches' Poll or the football ratings. When the regular season is complete, the NAIA plans to sponsor a playoff to determine the year's national champion. A final poll will be taken after completion of the 2014 NAIA Football National Championship.

== Poll release dates ==
The poll release dates are scheduled to be:

2014 Poll Release Dates
Spring	April 14
Preseason	August 11
Week 1	September 15
Week 2	September 22
Week 3	September 29
Week 4	October 6
Week 5	October 13
Week 6	October 20
Week 7	October 27
Week 8	November 3
Week 9	November 10
Week 10 (Final Regular Season)	November 16
Postseason	December 22

== Week by week rankings ==
	Week 0-Spring Apr 14	Week 0-Preseason Aug 11	Week 1-Poll 1 Sep 15	Week 2-Poll 2 Sep 22	Week 3-Poll 3 Sep 29	Week 4-Poll 4 Oct 6	Week 5-Poll 5 Oct 13	Week 6-Poll 6 Oct 20	Week 7-Poll 7 Oct 27	Week 8-Poll 8 Nov 3	Week 9-Poll 9 Nov 10	Week 10-Final Nov 16	Week 11-Postseason Dec 22	
1.	Grand View (IA)	Grand View (IA)	Grand View (IA)	Morningside (IA)	Morningside (IA)	Morningside (IA)	Morningside (IA)	Morningside (IA)	Morningside (IA)	Morningside (IA)	Morningside (IA)	Carroll (MT)	Southern Oregon	1.
2.	Carroll (MT)	Carroll (MT)	Morningside (IA)	Baker (KS)	Baker (KS)	Baker (KS)	Baker (KS)	Baker (KS)	Carroll (MT)	Carroll (MT)	Carroll (MT)	Grand View (IA)	Marian (IN)	2.
3.	Cumberlands (KY)	Morningside (IA)	Baker (KS)	Tabor (KS)	Tabor (KS)	Georgetown (KY)	Carroll (MT)	Carroll (MT)	Grand View (IA)	Grand View (IA)	Grand View (IA)	Saint Xavier (IL)	Morningside (IA)	3.
4.	Morningside (IA)	Cumberlands (KY)	Tabor (KS)	Faulkner (AL)	Faulkner (AL)	Carroll (MT)	Southern Oregon	Grand View (IA)	Faulkner (AL)	Faulkner (AL)	Southern Oregon	Morningside (IA)	Saint Xavier (IL)	4.
5.	Baker (KS)	Baker (KS)	Rocky Mountain (MT)	Carroll (MT)	Carroll (MT)	Southern Oregon	Grand View (IA)	Faulkner (AL)	(T) Georgetown (KY)	Southern Oregon	Georgetown (KY)	Missouri Valley (MO)	Carroll (MT)	5.
6.	Saint Francis (IN)	Saint Francis (IN)	Faulkner (AL)	Georgetown (KY)	Georgetown (KY)	Grand View (IA)	William Penn (IA)	Georgetown (KY)	(T) Southern Oregon	Georgetown (KY)	Saint Xavier (IL)	Lindsey Wilson (KY)	Grand View (IA)	6.
7.	Missouri Valley (MO)	Missouri Valley (MO)	Carroll (MT)	Southern Oregon	Southern Oregon	Missouri Valley (MO)	Faulkner (AL)	Southern Oregon	Baker (KS)	Northwestern (IA)	Missouri Valley (MO)	Marian (IN)	Lindsey Wilson (KY)	7.
8.	Tabor (KS)	Tabor (KS)	Georgetown (KY)	Grand View (IA)	Grand View (IA)	William Penn (IA)	Robert Morris (IL)	Northwestern (IA)	Northwestern (IA)	Saint Xavier (IL)	Lindsey Wilson (KY)	Southern Oregon	Missouri Valley (MO)	8.
9.	Faulkner (AL)	Rocky Mountain (MT)	Southern Oregon	Saint Francis (IN)	Missouri Valley (MO)	Faulkner (AL)	Georgetown (KY)	Saint Xavier (IL)	Saint Xavier (IL)	Missouri Valley (MO)	Marian (IN)	MidAmerica Nazarene (KS)	MidAmerica Nazarene (KS)	9.
10.	Rocky Mountain (MT)	Faulkner (AL)	Saint Xavier (IL)	Rocky Mountain (MT)	Saint Xavier (IL)	Robert Morris (IL)	Tabor (KS)	Missouri Valley (MO)	Missouri Valley (MO)	Lindsey Wilson (KY)	Faulkner (AL)	Georgetown (KY)	Faulkner (AL)	10.
11.	Benedictine (KS)	Benedictine (KS)	Cumberlands (KY)	Missouri Valley (MO)	William Penn (IA)	Tabor (KS)	Cumberland (TN)	William Penn (IA)	Lindsey Wilson (KY)	Marian (IN)	MidAmerica Nazarene (KS)	Faulkner (AL)	Georgetown (KY)	11.
12.	Georgetown (KY)	Georgetown (KY)	Saint Francis (IN)	St. Francis (IL)	(T) Northwestern (IA)	Cumberland (TN)	Northwestern (IA)	Robert Morris (IL)	Cumberland (TN)	MidAmerica Nazarene (KS)	Northwestern (IA)	Northwestern (IA)	Northwestern (IA)	12.
13.	Northwestern (IA)	Northwestern (IA)	Missouri Valley (MO)	Saint Xavier (IL)	(T) Robert Morris (IL)	Northwestern (IA)	Saint Xavier (IL)	Rocky Mountain (MT)	Marian (IN)	Baker (KS)	Baker (KS)	Ottawa (KS)	Ottawa (KS)	13.
14.	Ottawa (KS)	Ottawa (KS)	St. Francis (IL)	Benedictine (KS)	Cumberland (TN)	St. Francis (IL)	Missouri Valley (MO)	Lindsey Wilson (KY)	MidAmerica Nazarene (KS)	Ottawa (KS)	Ottawa (KS)	Valley City State (ND)	Campbellsville (KY)	14.
15.	Sterling (KS)	Sterling (KS)	Dakota Wesleyan (SD)	William Penn (IA)	Saint Francis (IN)	Eastern Oregon	Rocky Mountain (MT)	Cumberland (TN)	Ottawa (KS)	Valley City State (ND)	Valley City State (ND)	Eastern Oregon	Eastern Oregon	15.
16.	(T) St. Ambrose (IA)	Saint Xavier (IL)	Ottawa (KS)	Northwestern (IA)	St. Francis (IL)	Saint Xavier (IL)	Dakota Wesleyan (SD)	Marian (IN)	William Penn (IA)	William Penn (IA)	Eastern Oregon	Langston (OK)	Valley City State (ND)	16.
17.	(T) Saint Xavier (IL)	St. Ambrose (IA)	Benedictine (KS)	Lindsey Wilson (KY)	Eastern Oregon	Rocky Mountain (MT)	Lindsey Wilson (KY)	Ottawa (KS)	Valley City State (ND)	Robert Morris (IL)	Langston (OK)	Campbellsville (KY)	Baker (KS)	17.
18.	Lindsey Wilson (KY)	Lindsey Wilson (KY)	Northwestern (IA)	Cumberland (TN)	Rocky Mountain (MT)	Dakota Wesleyan (SD)	St. Francis (IL)	Tabor (KS)	Robert Morris (IL)	Friends (KS)	Tabor (KS)	Baker (KS)	Langston (OK)	18.
19.	Friends (KS)	Friends (KS)	Lindsey Wilson (KY)	Robert Morris (IL)	Marian (IN)	Benedictine (KS)	Ottawa (KS)	Valley City State (ND)	Dakota Wesleyan (SD)	Cumberland (TN)	Campbellsville (KY)	William Penn (IA)	William Penn (IA)	19.
20.	St. Francis (IL)	St. Francis (IL)	William Penn (IA)	Marian (IN)	Dakota Wesleyan (SD)	Lindsey Wilson (KY)	Eastern Oregon	MidAmerica Nazarene (KS)	Friends (KS)	Benedictine (KS)	Siena Heights (MI)	Robert Morris (IL)	Robert Morris (IL)	20.
21.	Dakota Wesleyan (SD)	Dakota Wesleyan (SD)	Cumberland (TN)	Eastern Oregon	Benedictine (KS)	Ottawa (KS)	Marian (IN)	Dakota Wesleyan (SD)	Rocky Mountain (MT)	Eastern Oregon	William Penn (IA)	Friends (KS)	Friends (KS)	21.
22.	Langston (OK)	Southern Oregon	Peru State (NE)	Dakota Wesleyan (SD)	Lindsey Wilson (KY)	Marian (IN)	Valley City State (ND)	Friends (KS)	Benedictine (KS)	Tabor (KS)	Reinhardt (GA)	Doane (NE)	Doane (NE)	22.
23.	Peru State (NE)	Langston (OK)	Langston (OK)	Cumberlands (KY)	Ottawa (KS)	Valley City State (ND)	MidAmerica Nazarene (KS)	Campbellsville (KY)	Eastern Oregon	Langston (OK)	Robert Morris (IL)	Webber International (FL)	Webber International (FL)	23.
24.	Southern Oregon	Peru State (NE)	Friends (KS)	Kentucky Christian	MidAmerica Nazarene (KS)	Saint Francis (IN)	Campbellsville (KY)	Benedictine (KS)	Tabor (KS)	Dakota Wesleyan (SD)	Friends (KS)	Tabor (KS)	Tabor (KS)	24.
25.	Cumberland (TN)	Cumberland (TN)	(T) St. Ambrose (IA); (T) Eastern Oregon	Ottawa (KS)	Evangel (MO)	Kentucky Christian	Benedictine (KS)	St. Francis (IL)	Langston (OK)	Campbellsville (KY)	Webber International (FL)	Benedictine (KS)	Benedictine (KS)	25.
	Week 0-Spring Apr 14	Week 0-Preseason Aug 11	Week 1-Poll 1 Sep 15	Week 2-Poll 2 Sep 22	Week 3-Poll 3 Sep 29	Week 4-Poll 4 Oct 6	Week 5-Poll 5 Oct 13	Week 6-Poll 6 Oct 20	Week 7-Poll 7 Oct 27	Week 8-Poll 8 Nov 3	Week 9-Poll 9 Nov 10	Week 10-Final Nov 16	Week 11-Postseason Dec 22	
		Dropped: NONE	Dropped: Sterling (KS)	Dropped: Peru State (NE); Langston (OK); Friends (KS); St. Ambrose (IA)	Dropped: Cumberlands (KY); Kentucky Christian	Dropped: MidAmerica Nazarene (KS); Evangel (MO)	Dropped: Saint Francis (IN); Kentucky Christian	Dropped: Eastern Oregon	Dropped: St. Francis (IL); Campbellsville (KY)	Dropped: Rocky Mountain (MT)	Dropped: Cumberland (TN); Benedictine (KS); Dakota Wesleyan (SD)	Dropped: Siena Heights (MI); Reinhardt (GA)	Dropped: NONE	

Legend
	No change in ranking
	Increase in ranking
	Decrease in ranking
	Not ranked previous week
	NAIA National Champion
(т)	Tied with team above or below also with this symbol

== Leading Vote-Getters ==
Since the inception of the Coaches' Poll in 1999, the #1 ranking in the various weekly polls has been held by only a select group of teams. Through the end of 2014, the team and the number of times they have held the #1 weekly ranking are shown below. The number of times a team has been ranked #1 in the postseason poll (the national champion) is shown in parentheses.

In 1999, the results of a postseason poll, if one was conducted, are not known. Therefore, an additional poll was presumed, and the #1 postseason ranking has been credited to the postseason tournament champion, the Northwestern Oklahoma State Rangers.

Team	Total #1 Rankings
Carroll (MT)	57 (6)
Sioux Falls (SD)	55 (3)
Georgetown (KY)	25 (2)
Morningside (IA)	17
Saint Xavier (IL)	14 (1)
Northwestern Oklahoma State	12 (1)
Marian (IN)	9 (1)
Grand View (IA)	4 (1)
Azusa Pacific (CA)	3
Saint Francis (IN)	3
Cumberlands (KY)	2
Southern Oregon	1 (1)
