= 2014 NAIA football season =

American college football season

- National Championship: Daytona Beach Municipal Stadium; Daytona Beach, FL; December 19, 2014
- Champion: Southern Oregon
- Player of the Year: Austin Dodge (quarterback, Southern Oregon)

The 2014 NAIA football season was the component of the 2014 college football season organized by the National Association of Intercollegiate Athletics (NAIA) in the United States. The season's playoffs, known as the NAIA Football National Championship, culminated with the championship game on December 19, at Daytona Beach Municipal Stadium in Daytona Beach, Florida. The Southern Oregon Raiders defeated the Marian Knights, 55–31, in the title game to win the program's first NAIA championship.

== Conference standings ==
2014 Central States Football League standings
	Conf.			Overall
Team	W		L	W		L
No. 18 Langston $^	5	–	0	7	–	4
SAGU	4	–	1	4	–	6
Oklahoma Baptist	3	–	2	8	–	3
Wayland Baptist	2	–	3	3	–	8
Texas College	1	–	4	1	–	10
Bacone	0	–	5	0	–	11
$ – Conference champion; ^ – NAIA playoff participant; Rankings from NAIA Coaches' Poll

2014 Frontier Conference football standings
	Conf.			Overall
Team	W		L	W		L
No. 5 Carroll (MT) $^	9	–	1	10	–	2
No. 1 Southern Oregon ^	8	–	2	13	–	2
No. 15 Eastern Oregon	7	–	3	8	–	3
Montana Western	6	–	4	6	–	5
Rocky Mountain	4	–	6	5	–	6
College of Idaho	3	–	7	4	–	7
Montana State–Northern	2	–	8	3	–	8
Montana Tech	1	–	9	1	–	9
$ – Conference champion; ^ – NAIA playoff participant; Rankings from NAIA Coaches' Poll

2014 Great Plains Athletic Conference football standings
	Conf.			Overall
Team	W		L	W		L
No. 3 Morningside +^	8	–	1	11	–	2
No. 12 Northwestern (IA) +^	8	–	1	9	–	2
No. 22 Doane	7	–	2	7	–	3
Dakota Wesleyan	5	–	4	7	–	4
Hastings	5	–	4	6	–	4
Concordia (NE)	4	–	5	5	–	6
Nebraska Wesleyan	4	–	5	4	–	6
Briar Cliff	2	–	7	2	–	9
Midland	1	–	8	2	–	8
Dordt	1	–	8	2	–	9
+ – Conference co-champions; ^ – NAIA playoff participant; Rankings from NAIA Coaches' Poll

2014 Heart of America Athletic Conference football standings
	Conf.			Overall
Team	W		L	W		L
No. 9 MidAmerica Nazarene +^	8	–	1	9	–	2
No. 8 Missouri Valley +^	8	–	1	9	–	3
No. 16 Baker	6	–	3	8	–	3
No. 25 Benedictine (KS)	6	–	3	7	–	4
Central Methodist	5	–	4	6	–	5
Culver–Stockton	4	–	5	6	–	5
Evangel	4	–	5	6	–	5
Avila	2	–	7	4	–	7
Peru State	2	–	7	3	–	8
Graceland	0	–	9	0	–	11
+ – Conference co-champions; ^ – NAIA playoff participant; Rankings from NAIA Coaches' Poll

2014 Kansas Collegiate Athletic Conference football standings
	Conf.			Overall
Team	W		L	W		L
No. 13 Ottawa $^	8	–	1	9	–	3
No. 21 Friends	7	–	2	8	–	3
Sterling	7	–	2	7	–	4
Bethany (KS)	5	–	4	7	–	4
No. 24 Tabor	5	–	4	7	–	4
McPherson	4	–	5	4	–	7
Saint Mary (KS)	4	–	5	4	–	7
Bethel (KS)	2	–	7	3	–	8
Kansas Wesleyan	2	–	7	2	–	9
Southwestern (KS)	1	–	8	1	–	10
$ – Conference champion; ^ – NAIA playoff participant; Rankings from NAIA Coaches' Poll

2014 Mid-South Conference football standings
	Conf.			Overall
Team	W		L	W		L
East Division
No. 7 Lindsey Wilson x^	6	–	0	10	–	3
No. 11 Georgetown (KY) ^	5	–	1	8	–	3
Pikeville	4	–	2	5	–	6
Kentucky Christian	2	–	4	5	–	6
Cumberlands (KY)	2	–	4	3	–	7
Bluefield	1	–	5	3	–	8
Union (KY)	1	–	5	1	–	9
West Division
No. 10 Faulkner x^	4	–	1	9	–	3
No. 14 Campbellsville x^	4	–	1	7	–	4
Reinhardt	3	–	2	6	–	4
Cumberland (TN)	2	–	3	6	–	5
Bethel (TN)	2	–	3	5	–	6
Belhaven	0	–	5	2	–	9
x – Division champion/co-champions; ^ – NAIA playoff participant; Rankings from NAIA Coaches' Poll

2014 Mid-States Football Association standings
	Conf.			Overall
Team	W		L	W		L
Mideast League
No. 2 Marian (IN) x^	5	–	1	11	–	3
Siena Heights x	5	–	1	6	–	4
Saint Francis (IN)	4	–	2	6	–	5
No. 20 Robert Morris (IL)	3	–	3	8	–	3
Taylor	3	–	3	5	–	6
St. Francis (IL)	1	–	5	4	–	7
Concordia (MI)	0	–	6	3	–	8
Midwest League
No. 6 Grand View x^	5	–	0	10	–	2
No. 4 Saint Xavier ^	4	–	1	10	–	3
No. 19 William Penn	3	–	2	7	–	4
St. Ambrose	2	–	3	5	–	5
Olivet Nazarene	1	–	4	2	–	9
Trinity International	0	–	5	3	–	7
x – League champion/co-champions ^ – NAIA playoff participant; Rankings from NAIA Coaches' Poll

2014 North Star Athletic Association football standings
	Conf.			Overall
Team	W		L	W		L
No. 17 Valley City State $^	6	–	0	9	–	2
Dickinson State	5	–	1	7	–	4
Jamestown	4	–	2	5	–	5
Presentation	3	–	3	6	–	4
Dakota State	2	–	4	6	–	5
Waldorf	1	–	5	3	–	7
Mayville State	0	–	6	2	–	9
$ – Conference champion; ^ – NAIA playoff participant; Rankings from NAIA Coaches' Poll

2014 Sun Conference football standings
	Conf.			Overall
Team	W		L	W		L
No. 23 Webber International $	4	–	1	8	–	3
Southeastern	3	–	2	8	–	3
Warner	3	–	2	6	–	5
Ave Maria	3	–	2	5	–	6
Edward Waters	2	–	3	5	–	6
Point	0	–	5	0	–	9
$ – Conference champion; Rankings from NAIA Coaches' Poll

2014 NAIA independents football records
	Conf.			Overall
Team	W		L	W		L
Menlo		–		3	–	8
Arizona Christian		–		2	–	7
Lindenwood–Belleville		–		2	–	8
Missouri Baptist		–		1	–	10
Haskell		–		0	–	9
