= Berk Brown =

American football coach

Current position
- Title: Head coach
- Team: Southern Oregon
- Conference: Frontier
- Record: 20–21

Playing career
- ?–2004: Modesto
- 2005–2006: Southern Oregon
- Position: Defensive lineman

Coaching career (HC unless noted)
- 2007: Southern Oregon (TE)
- 2008–2009: Southern Oregon (DL/ST)
- 2010: Southern Oregon (DC)
- 2011–2012: Southern Oregon (LB)
- 2013–2014: Southern Oregon (DC)
- 2016: St. Mary's School (OR) (assistant)
- 2017–2019: Crater HS (OR) (assistant)
- 2020–2022: Crater HS (OR)
- 2023–present: Southern Oregon

Head coaching record
- Overall: 20–21 (college); 13–12 (high school)
- Tournaments: 0–1 (OSAA)

Accomplishments and honors

Awards
- AFCA–NAIA Region 5 Coach of the Year (2024)

Berk Brown is an American college football coach and former player. He is the head football coach for Southern Oregon University, a position he has held since 2023.

== Early life ==
Brown played football as a defensive lineman for Modesto Junior College and then joined the Southern Oregon Raiders during the 2005 and 2006 seasons. In 2005, the Raiders finished with a 1–9 record, followed by a 2–7 record in 2006.

== Coaching career ==
Following his playing career, Brown stayed with the Raiders as an assistant coach. In 2007, Brown was in charge of the tight ends, then from 2008 to 2009 he was in charge of the defensive line and special teams. In 2010, he was named as the defensive coordinator, but when Craig Howard was hired as the head coach in 2011, he did not retain his position. Instead he was put in charge of the linebackers for the 2011 and 2012 seasons. In 2013, he was once again promoted to defensive coordinator. The 2014 Southern Oregon Raiders football team won the program's first NAIA football national championship, defeating the Marian Knights by a score of 55–31. In 2015, the Raiders returned to the national championship game, facing Marian for the second year in a row. However, Marian got better of the Southern Oregon in the rematch, winning by a score of 31–14.

Following the season, it was announced that Brown was resigning and accepting a position as an assistant athletic director, assistant football coach, and as a health and physical education teacher at St. Mary's School in Medford, Oregon. He remained there for one year before accepting a position as defensive coordinator at Crater High School in Central Point, Oregon. In 2020, Brown was announced as the next head coach of the Crater Comets. He spent three seasons with the Comets, accumulating an overall record of 13–12 and making one appearance in the OSAA 5A playoffs in 2021.

In January 2023, Brown was announced as the head football coach at Southern Oregon. Following the 2024 season, Brown was named as the AFCA–NAIA Region 5 co-Coach of the Year alongside Texas College head coach Jarrail Jackson. In his three seasons as head coach of the Raiders, Brown has accumulated an overall record of 17–14.

== Head coaching record ==
=== College ===
Year	Team	Overall	Conference	Standing	Bowl/playoffs	NAIA^{#}
Southern Oregon Raiders (Frontier Conference) (2023–present)
2023	Southern Oregon	6–4	5–3	T–4th		
2024	Southern Oregon	8–3	5–3	T–4th		24
2025	Southern Oregon	3–7	2–4	5th (West)		
2026	Southern Oregon	3–7	2–4	T–4th (West)		
Southern Oregon:		20–21	14–14			
Total:		20–21				
^{#}Rankings from final NAIA Coaches' Poll.

=== High school ===
Year	Team	Overall	Conference	Standing	Bowl/playoffs
Crater High School (OSAA 5A Special District 4) (2020–2021)
2020	Crater HS	4–2	1–0	2nd	
2021	Crater HS	6–4	6–1	2nd	L OSAA 5A first round
Crater High School (OSAA 5A Special District 2) (2022)
2022	Crater HS	3–6	3–5	6th	
Crater HS:		13–12	10–6		
Total:		13–12			
^{#}Rankings from final Coaches Poll.
