= Charles Toole (American football) =

American football player and coach (1922–2008)

Biographical details
- Born: January 5, 1922; Boston, Massachusetts, U.S.
- Died: June 23, 2008 (aged 86); San Francisco, California, U.S.
- Education: Boston College (1943)

Playing career
- 1939–1942: Boston College

Coaching career (HC unless noted)
- 1955–1957: Loras

Charles E. Toole (January 5, 1922 – June 23, 2008) was an American football coach. He served as the head coach at Loras College in Dubuque, Iowa from 1955 to 1957.
