= Roy McNeal =

American football coach

Biographical details
- Born: June 23, 1891; Dallas County, Missouri, U.S.
- Died: May 25, 1976 (aged 84); Ashland, Oregon, U.S.

Playing career

Football
- 1911–1912: Henderson-Brown
- Positions: Tackle, fullback (football)

Coaching career (HC unless noted)

Football
- 1920–1921: Albany (OR)
- 1922–1925: Puget Sound
- 1927–1931: Southern Oregon Normal

Basketball
- c. 1920: Albany (OR)
- 1927–1932: Southern Oregon Normal

Baseball
- c. 1920: Albany (OR)

Track
- c. 1920: Albany (OR)

Administrative career (AD unless noted)
- 1919–1922: Albany (OR)
- 1922–1926: Puget Sound
- 1927–?: Southern Oregon Normal

Roy Wilson McNeal (June 23, 1891 – May 25, 1976) was an American college sports coach, athletics administrator, and professor. He served as the head football coach at Albany College—now known as Lewis & Clark College—in Albany, Oregon from 1920 to 1921, the College of Puget Sound—now known as the University of Puget Sound—in Tacoma, Washington from 1922 to 1925, and Southern Oregon State Normal School—now known as Southern Oregon University—in Ashland, Oregon from 1927 to 1931. He also coached basketball, baseball, and track at Albany. McNeal later served as professor of geography at Southern Oregon.

McNeal attended Henderson-Brown College—now known as Henderson State University—in Arkadelphia, Arkansas, where he earned eight varsity letters in two years. He played at tackle and fullback in football, and ran the 440-yard dash in track. McNeal earned a Bachelor of Science degree from the University of Arizona in 1916. At Arizona, he was an assistant to coach Pop McKale.

== Head coaching record ==
=== Football ===
Year	Team	Overall	Conference	Standing	Bowl/playoffs
Albany Pirates (Independent) (1920–1921)
1920	Albany				
1921	Albany				
Albany:					
Puget Sound Loggers (Independent) (1922–1925)
1922	Puget Sound	3–3–1			
1923	Puget Sound	4–2–1			
1924	Puget Sound	2–3–1			
1925	Puget Sound	3–3			
Puget Sound:		11–10–3			
Southern Oregon Normal (Independent) (1927–1928)
1927	Southern Oregon Normal	3–0			
1928	Southern Oregon Normal	1–3–2			
Southern Oregon Normal (California Coast Conference) (1929)
1929	Southern Oregon Normal	2–4–1	0–4	8th	
Southern Oregon Normal (Independent) (1930–1931)
1930	Southern Oregon Normal	4–2			
1931	Southern Oregon Normal	3–0–2			
Southern Oregon Normal:		13–9–5	0–4		
Total:					
