= 2014 NAIA football national championship =

2014 Russell Athletic NAIA Football National Championship
Southern Oregon Raiders	Marian Knights
(12–2)	(11–2)
55	31
Head coach: Craig Howard	Head coach: Mark Henninger
Coaches 8	Coaches 7
	1	2	3	4	Total
Southern Oregon	24	14	0	17	55
Marian	7	3	14	7	31
- Date: December 19, 2014
- Season: 2014
- Stadium: Municipal Stadium
- Location: Daytona Beach, Florida
- MVP: Austin Dodge Southern Oregon (Offense); Julius Rucker Southern Oregon (Defense)
- Referee: Randy Hagedorn • Umpire: Steve Blocher • Linesman: Tom Berens • Line judge: Derek Ohme • Back judge: Chris Ehlers • Field judge: Tom Kos • Side judge: Scott Nicholson •
- Attendance: 1,941

United States TV coverage
- Network: ESPNU
- Announcers: Jason Knapp, Forrest Conoly, Tiffany Greene

The 2014 NAIA football national championship was a four-round, sixteen-team tournament played between November 22 through December 19 of 2014. The tournament concluded on December 19 with a single game played as the 59th Annual Russell Athletic NAIA Football National Championship. The game matched #8 Southern Oregon (12–2) against #7 Marian (11–2).

The championship game was played at Municipal Stadium in Daytona Beach, Florida. A total of sixteen teams participated in the single-elimination tournament from across the country. Placement in the tournament was based on the final edition of the 2014 NAIA Coaches' Poll. This year's field included all but one of the top 17 teams from the final poll.

This was a new venue for the championship game, which had been contested for the past six years at Barron Stadium in Rome, Georgia.

== Scoring Summary ==
Scoring summary

Quarter	Time	Drive			Team	Scoring information	Score	
Quarter	Time	Plays	Yards	TOP	Team	Scoring information	Southern Oregon Raiders	Marian Knights
1	13:42	5	44	1:18	Southern Oregon Raiders	48-yard field goal by Aldrick Rosas	3	0
1	11:58	-	-	-	Southern Oregon Raiders	Interception returned 54 yards for touchdown by Julius Rucker, Aldrick Rosas kick Good	10	0
1	7:58	9	75	4:00	Marian Knights	Anthony Jones Jr. 22-yard touchdown reception from Hayden Northern, Martin Waddick kick Good	10	7
1	6:30	4	65	1:28	Southern Oregon Raiders	Melvin Mason 7-yard touchdown run, Aldrick Rosas kick Good	17	7
1	0:00	6	26	1:53	Southern Oregon Raiders	Melvin Mason 1-yard touchdown run, Aldrick Rosas kick Good	24	7
1	11:28	3	61	1:14	Southern Oregon Raiders	Melvin Mason 64-yard touchdown reception from Austin Dodge, Aldrick Rosas kick Good	31	7
2	7:08	13	54	4:20	Marian Knights	38-yard field goal by Martin Waddick	31	10
2	4:42	6	66	2:26	Southern Oregon Raiders	Melvin Mason 8-yard touchdown run, Aldrick Rosas kick Good	38	10
3	8:23	7	76	2:45	Marian Knights	Anthony Jones Jr. 12-yard touchdown reception from Hayden Northern, Martin Waddick kick Good	38	17
3	4:58	4	34	1:42	Marian Knights	Krishawn Hogan 32-yard touchdown reception from Hayden Northern, Martin Waddick kick Good	38	24
4	14:49	11	57	2:52	Southern Oregon Raiders	Ryan Retzlaff 9-yard touchdown reception from Austin Dodge, Aldrick Rosas kick Good	45	24
4	14:37	1	75	0:12	Marian Knights	Anthony Jones Jr. 75-yard touchdown reception from Hayden Northern, Martin Waddick kick Good	45	31
4	10:28	12	57	4:09	Southern Oregon Raiders	38-yard field goal by Aldrick Rosas	48	31
4	8:35	1	51	0:15	Southern Oregon Raiders	Dylan Young 36-yard touchdown reception from Austin Dodge, Aldrick Rosas kick Good	55	31
"TOP" = time of possession. For other American football terms, see Glossary of American football.							Southern Oregon Raiders	Marian Knights

== Tournament bracket ==
1st Round; November 22
4	Morningside (IA) (9–1)	42
13	Ottawa (KS) (9–2)	21
5	Missouri Valley (MO) (8–2)	20
12	Northwestern (IA) (8–2)	17
2	Grand View (IA) (9–1)	38
16	Langston (OK) (7–3)	3
7	Marian (IN) (8–2)	34
10	Georgetown (KY) (8–2)	3
3	St. Xavier (IL) (8–2)	38
17	Campbellsville (KY) (7–3)	35
6	Lindsey Wilson (KY) (9–2)	20
11	Faulkner (AL) (9–2)	17
1	Carroll (MT) (9–1)	49
14	Valley City State (ND) (9–1)	0
8	Southern Oregon (9–2)	44
9	MidAmerica Nazarene (KS) (9–1)	26

Quarterfinals; November 29
4	Morningside (IA) (10–1)	56
5	Missouri Valley (MO) (9–2)	28
2	Grand View (IA) (10–1)	6
7	Marian (IN) (9–2)	34
3	St. Xavier (IL) (9–2)	30
6	Lindsey Wilson (KY) (10–2)	17
1	Carroll (MT) (10–1)	42
8	Southern Oregon (10–2)	45

Semifinals; December 6
4	Morningside (IA) (11–1)	21
7	Marian (IN) (10–2)	41
3	St. Xavier (IL) (10–2)	37
8	Southern Oregon (11–2)	62

Championship; December 19
7	Marian (IN) (11–2)	31
8	Southern Oregon (12–2)	55

- * denotes OT.
