= Bill Abbey =

American football coach

William L. Abbey
Biographical details
- Born: c. 1927
- Education: University of Oregon, 1949

Coaching career (HC unless noted)
- 1951: Southern Oregon

Head coaching record
- Overall: 1–8

William L. Abbey is an American former football coach. In 1950 he was a tutor for Hood River Valley High School. In July 1951 he took the place of Al Simpson, who had announced he would quit to become a logger, as the head football coach at Southern Oregon College of Education—now known as Southern Oregon University—in Ashland, Oregon. He coached through the 1951 season, compiling a record of 1–8. Abbey left SOCE in 1954 for a job at Fort Ord as an athletic director.

== Head coaching record ==
Year	Team	Overall	Conference	Standing	Bowl/playoffs
Southern Oregon Red Raiders (Far Western Conference) (1951)
1951	Southern Oregon	1–8	1–2	4th	
Southern Oregon:		1–8	1–2		
Total:		1–8			
