= Aldrick Rosas =

American football player (born 1994)

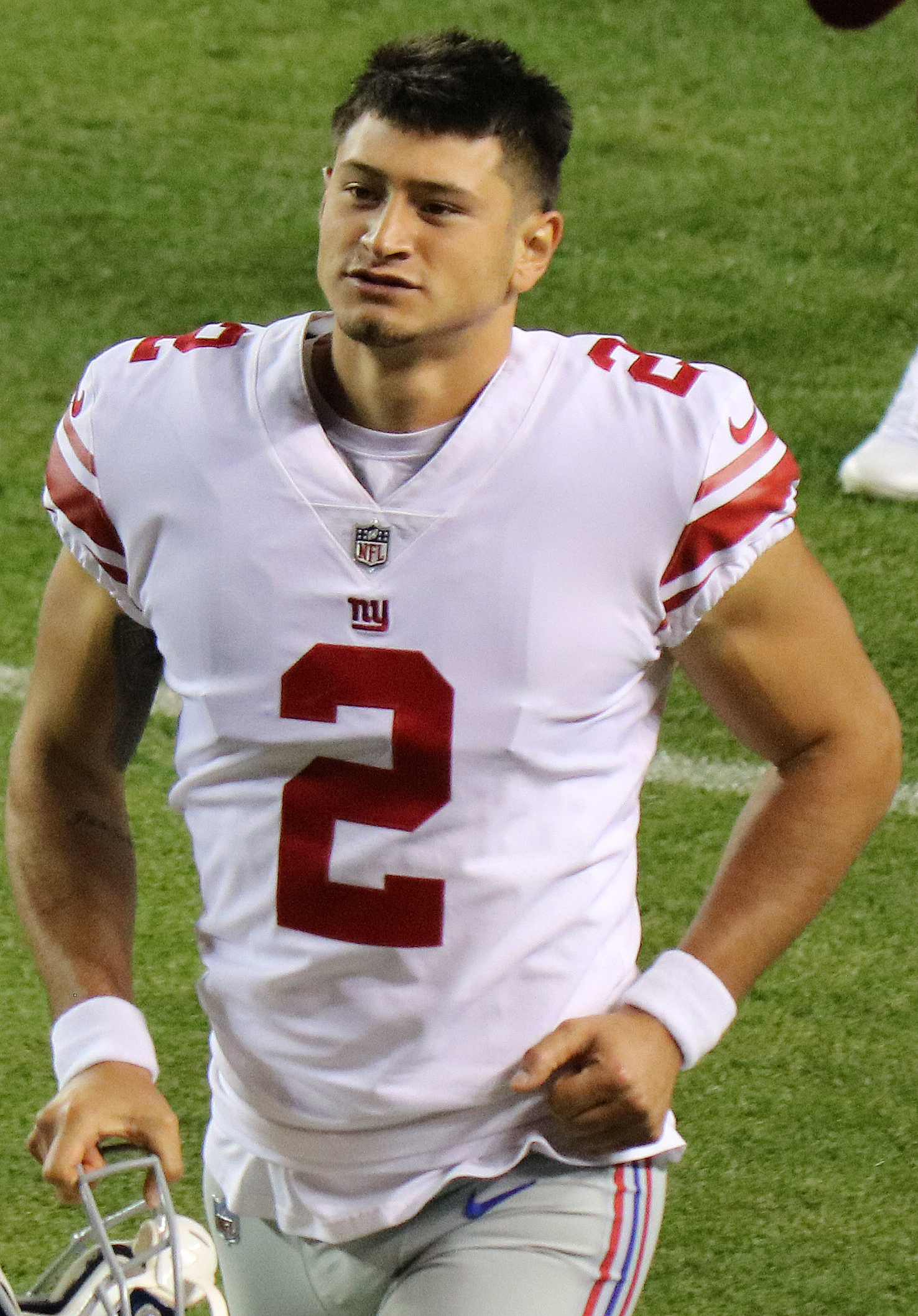
- Rosas with the New York Giants in 2017

No. 2, 7, 6, 5
- Position: Placekicker

Personal information
- Born: December 30, 1994 (age 31); Chico, California, U.S.
- Listed height: 6 ft 2 in (1.88 m)
- Listed weight: 221 lb (100 kg)

Career information
- High school: Orland (Orland, California)
- College: Southern Oregon (2013–2015)
- NFL draft: 2016: undrafted

Career history
- Tennessee Titans (2016)*; New York Giants (2017–2019); Jacksonville Jaguars (2020); New Orleans Saints (2021); Detroit Lions (2021–2022)
- * Offseason or practice squad member only

Awards and highlights
- Second-team All-Pro (2018); Pro Bowl (2018); NAIA national champion (2014)

Career NFL statistics
- Field goals: 72
- Field goal attempts: 91
- Field goal %: 79.1
- Longest field goal: 57
- Touchbacks: 159
- Stats at Pro Football Reference

Aldrick Rosas al-DREEK row-SOS; (born December 30, 1994) is an American former professional football player who was a placekicker in the National Football League (NFL). He played college football for the Southern Oregon Raiders. Rosas was selected to the Pro Bowl for the 2018 season as a member of the New York Giants.

== College career ==
Rosas who is of Mexican–American descent, played college football for the Southern Oregon Raiders of the National Association of Intercollegiate Athletics (NAIA). In 2014, he tore the ACL in his kicking leg making a tackle in the NAIA Championship Game. After missing the 2015 season, he decided to forego the remainder of college eligibility to pursue a career in the National Football League (NFL).

== Professional career ==
Pre-draft measurables
Height	Weight
6 ft 1 1/2 in (1.87 m)	195 lb (88 kg)
All values from Pro Day

=== Tennessee Titans ===
Following the conclusion of the 2016 NFL draft, Rosas signed with the Tennessee Titans as an undrafted free agent on May 9, 2016. On September 2, Rosas was waived by the Titans.

=== New York Giants ===
==== 2017 season ====
On January 19, 2017, Rosas signed a reserve/future contract with the New York Giants. Rosas was the only kicker on the Giants roster after former Giants' placekicker Robbie Gould agreed to a two-year contract with the San Francisco 49ers, until veteran Mike Nugent signed a contract with the team on August 1. Rosas ultimately won the starting kicker job after Nugent was released during final roster cuts.

On September 10, in the Giants' season-opening 19–3 loss to the Dallas Cowboys, Rosas converted his first NFL career field goal, a 25-yard attempt, in the third quarter. Prior to the game, he watched his girlfriend, Tiffany Lopez, give birth via FaceTime.

Rosas finished the season with a 72% field goal conversion rate (31st in the league) and an 87% point after touchdown (PAT) conversion rate (last in the league).

==== 2018 season ====
Rosas retained his starting job with the Giants for the 2018 season. He vastly improved on his rookie season, converting 32 of 33 field goal attempts and 31 of 32 PATs, with his only missed PAT due to a poor snap. He was named NFC Special Teams Player of the Week for his Week 13 performance against the Chicago Bears where he converted three field goals, including a New York Giants franchise record 57-yarder and the game-winning 44-yard field goal in overtime.

On December 18, 2018, Rosas was named to his first Pro Bowl, and on January 4, 2019, Rosas was named a Second-team All-Pro for 2018.

==== 2019 season ====
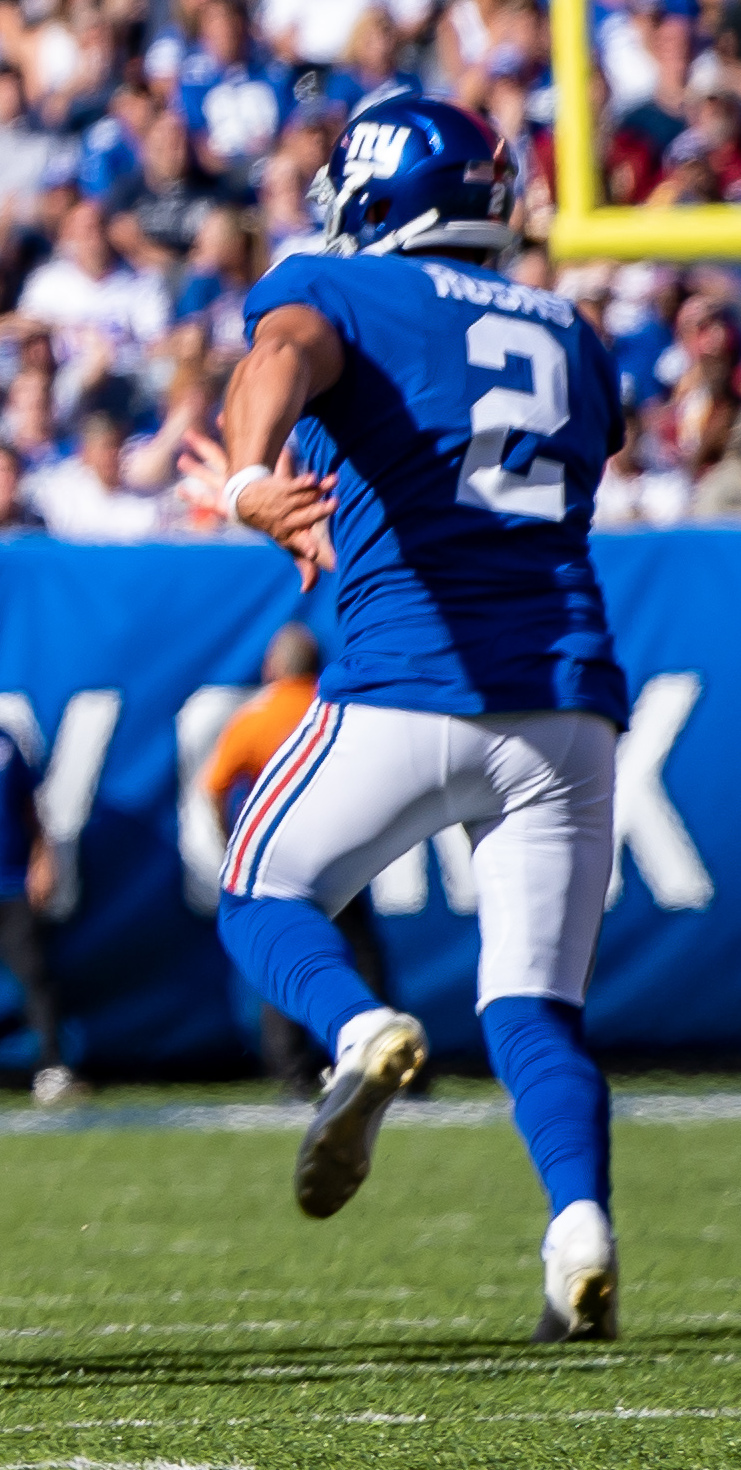
Rosas with the New York Giants in 2019

The Giants re-signed Rosas as an exclusive-rights free agent on March 7, 2019.

The Giants placed a second-round tender on Rosas on March 16, 2020, and signed it on April 8. On July 15, Rosas was formally charged with three misdemeanors in the Superior Court of California for an alleged high-speed hit-and-run that led to his arrest on June 16. Rosas was released by the Giants on July 27. He pleaded no contest to the charges on September 23, and was sentenced to three years of probation.

=== Jacksonville Jaguars ===
On September 28, 2020, Rosas was signed to the practice squad of the Jacksonville Jaguars. He was elevated to the active roster on October 3 for the team's week 4 game against the Cincinnati Bengals, and made four field goals in his first game as a Jaguar. He reverted to the practice squad after the game on October 5. He was placed on the practice squad/injured list on October 9, and activated back to the practice squad on October 29. He was released on October 30. The next day, he was suspended four games by the NFL as a result of the incident from June. He was re-signed to the Jaguars' practice squad while still on suspension on November 9. He was reinstated from suspension on November 24, and restored to the practice squad. He was elevated to the active roster on November 28 for the team's week 12 game against the Cleveland Browns, and reverted to the practice squad after the game. He was promoted to the active roster on December 12, 2020.

Rosas re-signed with the Jaguars on March 17, 2021. He was released on July 30, 2021.

=== New Orleans Saints ===
Rosas was signed by the New Orleans Saints on August 21, 2021. He was released on September 1, and re-signed to the practice squad. On September 11, he was promoted to the active roster following an injury to starting kicker Wil Lutz. He was released on October 5.

=== Detroit Lions ===
On November 16, 2021, Rosas was signed to the Detroit Lions' practice squad. On February 8, 2022, Rosas signed a reserve/future contract with Detroit. He was released by the Lions on May 31. Rosas was signed to the practice squad on September 1. He was released on September 20.

== NFL career statistics ==
Legend
**Bold**	Career high

Year	Team	GP	Overall FGs								PATs			Points
Year	Team	GP	FGM	FGA	FG%	20−29	30−39	40−49	50+	Lng	XPM	XPA	XP%	Points
2017	NYG	**16**	18	25	72.0	8−8	3−5	4−9	3−3	52	20	23	87.0	74
2018	NYG	**16**	**32**	**33**	97.0	**9−9**	**13−13**	**6−6**	**4−5**	**57**	31	32	96.9	**127**
2019	NYG	**16**	12	17	70.6	6−6	5−6	1−4	0−1	45	**35**	**39**	89.7	71
2020	JAX	6	8	11	72.7	3−3	2−2	0−1	3−5	54	9	9	**100.0**	33
2021	NO	4	1	4	25.0	−	0−1	1−1	0−2	44	13	13	**100.0**	16
2021	DET	1	1	1	**100.0**	−	−	1−1	−	43	1	1	**100.0**	4
Career		59	72	91	79.1	26−26	23−27	13−22	10−16	57	109	117	93.2	325
