= Jeff Olson (American football) =

American football coach

Biographical details
- Education: Southern Oregon University

Playing career
- 1980–1981: Southern Oregon
- Position: Defensive back

Coaching career (HC unless noted)
- 1983–1995: Southern Oregon (assistant)
- 1996–2004: Southern Oregon

Head coaching record
- Overall: 50–36
- Tournaments: 2–2 (NAIA playoffs)

Jeff Olson is an American former football coach. He served as the head football coach at Southern Oregon University in Ashland, Oregon for nine seasons, from 1996 until 2004, compiling record of 50–36.

His son Dante Olson signed with the Philadelphia Eagles in 2020 after a collegiate career at Montana.

== Head coaching record ==
Year	Team	Overall	Conference	Standing	Bowl/playoffs	NAIA^{#}
Southern Oregon Raiders (Columbia Football Association) (1996–1998)
1996	Southern Oregon	4–5	2–3	T–3rd		
1997	Southern Oregon	5–4	3–2	T–2nd		
1998	Southern Oregon	4–6	2–3	T–4th		
Southern Oregon Raiders (NAIA independent) (1999–2004)
1999	Southern Oregon	7–2				16
2000	Southern Oregon	5–4				
2001	Southern Oregon	9–2			L NAIA Quarterfinal	5
2002	Southern Oregon	8–3			L NAIA Quarterfinal	6
2003	Southern Oregon	5–4				23
2004	Southern Oregon	3–6				
Southern Oregon:		50–36	7–8			
Total:		50–36				
^{#}Rankings from final NAIA Coaches' Poll.
