= Steve Helminiak =

American football coach

Biographical details
- Education: Loras College

Playing career
- c. 1990: Loras

Coaching career (HC unless noted)
- 1991–2001: Loras (OL)
- 2004–2005: Rockford (OC/OL)
- 2006–2010: Southern Oregon
- 2011–2013: Loras (OL)
- 2013–2025: Loras

Head coaching record
- Overall: 58–104

Steve Helminiak is an American college football coach. He is the former head football coach for Loras College, a position he held form 2013 till his firing in November 2025. Helminiak served as the head football coach at Southern Oregon University from 2006 to 2010. His coaching record at Southern Oregon was 16–31.

== Head coaching record ==
Year	Team	Overall	Conference	Standing	Bowl/playoffs
Southern Oregon Raiders (NAIA independent) (2006–2010)
2006	Southern Oregon	3–6			
2007	Southern Oregon	5–4			
2008	Southern Oregon	3–7			
2009	Southern Oregon	2–7			
2010	Southern Oregon	3–7			
Southern Oregon:		16–31			
Loras Duhawks (Iowa Conference / American Rivers Conference) (2013–2025)
2013	Loras	0–3 (Note: Paul Mierkiewicz coached the first seven games of the season, during which Loras went 1–6 overall and 0–4 in conference play. The Duhawks were 1–9 overall and 0–7 in conference for the season.)	0–3	8th	
2014	Loras	3–7	2–5	T–6th	
2015	Loras	4–6	3–4	T–4th	
2016	Loras	1–9	1–7	9th	
2017	Loras	4–6	3–5	6th	
2018	Loras	4–6	3–5	6th	
2019	Loras	5–5	4–4	T–4th	
2020–21	Loras	2–0	1–0	N/A	
2021	Loras	4–6	4–4	T–5th	
2022	Loras	5–5	5–3	T–4th	
2023	Loras	5–5	4–5	5th	
2024	Loras	2–8	2–6	T–6th	
2025	Loras	3–7	3–5	6th	
Loras:		42–73	35–56		
Total:		58–104			
