= Robert Zahren =

American football player and coach (1926–2013)

Biographical details
- Born: July 21, 1926; Chicago, Illinois, U.S.
- Died: April 27, 2013 (aged 86); Dubuque, Iowa, U.S.

Playing career
- 1947–1950: Loras

Coaching career (HC unless noted)
- 1952: Mason City Holy Family HS (IA)
- 1953–1955: Sioux City Heelan HS (IA)
- 1956–1957: Loras (assistant)
- 1958–1959: Loras
- 1966–1987: Dubuque Senior HS (IA)

Robert E. Zahren (July 21, 1926 – April 27, 2013) was an American football player and coach. He served as the head football coach at Loras College in Dubuque, Iowa from 1958 to 1959.
