= Loras Duhawks football =

College football team

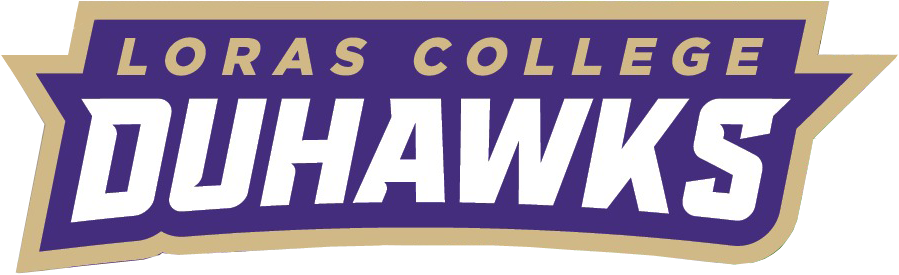
- First season: 1907; 119 years ago
- Athletic director: Denise Udelhofen
- Head coach: Brandon Novak; 1st season, 0–0 (–)
- Stadium: Rock Bowl Stadium
- Location: Dubuque, Iowa
- NCAA division: Division III
- Conference: ARC
- All-time record: 180–210–14 (.463)

Conference championships
- 1

Conference division championships
- 2
- Rivalries: Dubuque
- Colors: Purple, gold, and grey
- Mascot: Duhawk
- Website: duhawks.com

The Loras Duhawks football team represents Loras College in college football at the NCAA Division III level. The Duhawks are members of the American Rivers Conference (ARC), fielding its team in the ARC since 1986 when it was named the Iowa Intercollegiate Athletic Conference (IIAC). The Duhawks play their home games at Rock Bowl Stadium in Dubuque, Iowa. The team was also previously known as the St. Joseph's Duhawks, Dubuque Duhawks, and the Columbia Duhawks.

Their head coach is Brandon Novak, who took over the position for the 2026 season.

== Conference affiliations ==
- Independent (1907–1925; 1948–1949; 1953–1954)
- Iowa Intercollegiate Athletic Conference (1926–1947; 1950–1952; 1986–2017)
- Club team (1955–1985)
- American Rivers Conference (2018–present)

== Championships ==
=== Conference championships ===
Loras claims 1 conference title, which came in 1948.

Year	Conference	Overall Record	Conference Record	Coach
1948†	Midlands Conference	7–1	2–1	Wally Fromhart

† Co-champions

=== Division championships ===
Year	Division	Coach	Overall	Conf.	Opponent	CG result
1950	IIAC Northern Division	Wally Fromhart	8–3	5–0	St. Ambrose	6–27
1951	IIAC Northern Division	Richard Friend	6–4	5–0	St. Ambrose	0–44

== List of head coaches ==
=== Key ===
Key to symbols in coaches list
General		Overall		Conference		Postseason (Note: Although the first Rose Bowl Game was played in 1902, it has been continuously played since the 1916 game, and is recognized as the oldest bowl game by the NCAA. "—" indicates any season prior to 1916 when postseason games were not played.)	
No.	Order of coaches (Note: A running total of the number of head coaches, with coaches who served separate tenures being counted only once. Interim head coaches are represented with "Int" and are not counted in the running total. "—" indicates the team played but either without a coach or no coach is on record. "X" indicates an interim year without play.)	GC	Games coached	CW	Conference wins	PW	Postseason wins
DC	Division championships	OW	Overall wins	CL	Conference losses	PL	Postseason losses
CC	Conference championships	OL	Overall losses	CT	Conference ties	PT	Postseason ties
NC	National championships	OT	Overall ties (Note: Overtime rules in college football were introduced in 1996, making ties impossible in the period since.)	C%	Conference winning percentage		
†	Elected to the College Football Hall of Fame	O%	Overall winning percentage (Note: When computing the win–loss percentage, a tie counts as half a win and half a loss.)				

=== Coaches ===
List of head football coaches showing season(s) coached, overall records, conference records, postseason records, championships and selected awards
No.	Name	Season(s)	GC	OW	OL	OT	O%	CW	CL	CT	C%	DC	CC
1	John Chalmers	1907–1913	48	28	16	4	0.625	–	–	–	–	–	–
2	Gus Dorais	1914–1917	28	17	9	2	0.643	–	–	–	–	–	–
3	Walter Martin	1918–1919	–	–	–	–	–	–	–	–	–	–	–
4	Ira Davenport	1920–1921	–	–	–	–	–	–	–	–	–	–	–
5	Eddie Anderson	1922–1924	24	16	6	2	0.708	–	–	–	–	–	–
6	Elmer Layden	1925–1926	15	8	5	2	0.600	–	–	–	–	–	–
7	Johnny Armstrong	1927–1931	–	–	–	–	–	–	–	–	–	–	–
8	Jerry Jones	1932–1933	14	5	8	1	0.393	4	6	1	0.409	–	–
9	John Niemiec	1934–1937	30	11	17	2	0.400	6	13	2	0.333	–	–
10	Len A. Winter	1938–1940	–	–	–	–	–	–	–	–	–	–	–
11	Vince Dowd	1941–1942; 1945–1946	–	–	–	–	–	–	–	–	–	–	–
12	Wally Fromhart	1947–1950	36	27	9	0	0.750	7	0	0	1.000	1	1
13	Richard Friend	1951–1952	–	–	–	–	–	–	–	–	–	–	–
14	Mike Scarry	1953	8	5	2	1	0.688	–	–	–	–	–	–
15	Ed Murphy	1954	–	–	–	–	–	–	–	–	–	–	–
16	Charles Toole	1955–1957	–	–	–	–	–	–	–	–	–	–	–
17	Robert Zahren	1958–1959	–	–	–	–	–	–	–	–	–	–	–
18	Don Hendricks	1970–1974	–	–	–	–	–	–	–	–	–	–	–
19	Steve McGrath	1975	–	–	–	–	–	–	–	–	–	–	–
20	Bob Bucko	1976	–	–	–	–	–	–	–	–	–	–	–
21	Claude Maddox	1977	–	–	–	–	–	–	–	–	–	–	–
22	Dave Ostrander	1978–1979	19	4	15	0	0.211	–	–	–	–	–	–
23	Bob Bierie	1980–2004	–	–	–	–	–	–	–	–	–	–	–
24	Chris Klieman	2005	10	3	7	0	0.300	2	6	0	0.250	–	–
25	Steve Osterberger	2006–2010	50	19	31	0	0.380	16	24	0	0.400	–	–
26	Paul Mierkiewicz	2011–2013	30	4	26	0	0.133	1	21	0	0.045	–	–
27	Steve Helminiak	2013–2025	115	42	73	0	0.365	35	56	0	0.385	–	–
28	Brandon Novak	2026–present	0	0	0	0	–	0	0	0	–	–	–

== Year-by-year results since 1986 ==
National champions	Conference champions	Bowl game berth	Playoff berth

Season	Year	Head coach	Association	Division	Conference	Record						
Season	Year	Head coach	Association	Division	Conference	Overall			Conference			
Season	Year	Head coach	Association	Division	Conference	Win	Loss	Tie	Finish	Win	Loss	Tie
1986	1986	Bob Bierie	NCAA	Division III	IIAC	6	5	0	4th	5	3	0
1987	1987	Bob Bierie	NCAA	Division III	IIAC	4	7	0	T–6th	3	5	0
1988	1988	Bob Bierie	NCAA	Division III	IIAC	5	5	0	T–4th	4	4	0
1989	1989	Bob Bierie	NCAA	Division III	IIAC	6	4	0	T–3rd	5	3	0
1990	1990	Bob Bierie	NCAA	Division III	IIAC	7	3	0	4th	5	3	0
1991	1991	Bob Bierie	NCAA	Division III	IIAC	7	3	0	T–3rd	5	3	0
1992	1992	Bob Bierie	NCAA	Division III	IIAC	7	3	0	T–3rd	5	3	0
1993	1993	Bob Bierie	NCAA	Division III	IIAC	7	2	1	3rd	6	2	0
1994	1994	Bob Bierie	NCAA	Division III	IIAC	5	5	0	5th	4	4	0
1995	1995	Bob Bierie	NCAA	Division III	IIAC	7	3	0	4th	5	3	0
1996	1996	Bob Bierie	NCAA	Division III	IIAC	7	3	0	T–3rd	5	3	0
1997	1997	Bob Bierie	NCAA	Division III	IIAC	6	4	0	5th	4	4	0
1998	1998	Bob Bierie	NCAA	Division III	IIAC	4	6	0	8th	4	6	0
1999	1999	Bob Bierie	NCAA	Division III	IIAC	4	6	0	T–6th	4	6	0
2000	2000	Bob Bierie	NCAA	Division III	IIAC	4	6	0	7th	4	6	0
2001	2001	Bob Bierie	NCAA	Division III	IIAC	5	5	0	T–5th	4	5	0
2002	2002	Bob Bierie	NCAA	Division III	IIAC	5	5	0	5th	4	5	0
2003	2003	Bob Bierie	NCAA	Division III	IIAC	7	3	0	3rd	5	3	0
2004	2004	Bob Bierie	NCAA	Division III	IIAC	4	6	0	7th	3	5	0
2005	2005	Chris Klieman	NCAA	Division III	IIAC	3	7	0	7th	2	6	0
2006	2006	Steve Osterberger	NCAA	Division III	IIAC	4	6	0	T–5th	4	4	0
2007	2007	Steve Osterberger	NCAA	Division III	IIAC	2	8	0	8yh	1	7	0
2008	2008	Steve Osterberger	NCAA	Division III	IIAC	6	4	0	T–3rd	5	3	0
2009	2009	Steve Osterberger	NCAA	Division III	IIAC	2	8	0	T–6th	2	6	0
2010	2010	Steve Osterberger	NCAA	Division III	IIAC	5	5	0	T–4th	4	4	0
2011	2011	Paul Mierkiewicz	NCAA	Division III	IIAC	1	9	0	9th	0	8	0
2012	2012	Paul Mierkiewicz	NCAA	Division III	IIAC	2	8	0	7th	1	6	0
2013	2013	Paul Mierkiewicz (games 1–7) / Steve Helminiak (final 3)	NCAA	Division III	IIAC	1	9	0	8th	0	7	0
2014	2014	Steve Helminiak	NCAA	Division III	IIAC	3	7	0	T–6th	2	5	0
2015	2015	Steve Helminiak	NCAA	Division III	IIAC	4	6	0	T–4th	3	4	0
2016	2016	Steve Helminiak	NCAA	Division III	IIAC	1	9	0	9th	1	7	0
2017	2017	Steve Helminiak	NCAA	Division III	IIAC	4	6	0	6th	3	5	0
2018	2018	Steve Helminiak	NCAA	Division III	A-R-C	4	6	0	6th	3	5	0
2019	2019	Steve Helminiak	NCAA	Division III	A-R-C	5	5	0	T–4th	4	4	0
2020–21	2020–21	Steve Helminiak	NCAA	Division III	A-R-C	2	0	0	T–2nd	1	0	0
2021	2021	Steve Helminiak	NCAA	Division III	A-R-C	4	6	0	T–5th	4	4	0
2022	2022	Steve Helminiak	NCAA	Division III	A-R-C	5	5	0	T–5th	5	3	0
2023	2023	Steve Helminiak	NCAA	Division III	A-R-C	5	5	0	5th	4	4	0
2024	2024	Steve Helminiak	NCAA	Division III	A-R-C	2	8	0	T–7th	2	6	0
2025	2025	Steve Helminiak	NCAA	Division III	A-R-C	3	7	0	6th	3	5	0
