= Dave Ostrander =

American football coach and college administrator

Playing career
- 1970–1973: Coe

Coaching career (HC unless noted)
- 1975–1976: Iowa Wesleyan (assistant)
- 1977: Iowa Wesleyan
- 1978–1979: Loras
- 1980–1983: Monmouth (IL)

Head coaching record
- Overall: 13–50–1

David Ostrander is an American former football coach and college administrator. He served as the head football coach at Iowa Wesleyan College in Mount Pleasant, Iowa (1977), Loras College in Dubuque, Iowa (1978–1979), and Monmouth College in Monmouth, Illinois (1980–1983), compiling a career college football coaching record of 13–50–1. He most recently served as the vice president for advancement at Linfield College in McMinnville, Oregon.

A native of Buffalo Center, Iowa, Ostrander played college football at Coe College in Cedar Rapids, Iowa. He was an assistant football coach at Iowa Wesleyan for two years before being named head coach in January 1977.

== Head coaching record ==
=== College football ===
Year	Team	Overall	Conference	Standing	Bowl/playoffs
Iowa Wesleyan Tigers (NAIA Division II independent) (1977)
1977	Iowa Wesleyan	2–7			
Iowa Wesleyan:		2–7			
Loras Duhawks (club) (1978–1979)
1978	Loras	1–8			
1979	Loras	3–7			
Loras:		4–15			
Monmouth Fighting Scots (Midwest Conference) (1980–1983)
1980	Monmouth	1–8	1–7	T–9th	
1981	Monmouth	1–8	1–7	11th	
1982	Monmouth	3–6	2–3	4th (South)	
1983	Monmouth	2–6–1	1–3–1	T–4th (South)	
Monmouth:		7–28–1	5–20–1		
Total:		13–50–1			
