= Scott Johnson (American football) =

American football coach (born 1939/40)

Biographical details
- Born: 1939 or 1940 (age 86–87)

Coaching career (HC unless noted)
- 1972–1979: Southern Oregon

Head coaching record
- Overall: 34–40

Scott Johnson is an American former football coach. He served as the head football coach at Southern Oregon College—now known as Southern Oregon University in Ashland, Oregon for eight seasons, from 1972 until 1979. His record at Southern Oregon was 34–40.

== Head coaching record ==
Year	Team	Overall	Conference	Standing	Bowl/playoffs
Southern Oregon Red Raiders (Evergreen Conference) (1972–1979)
1972	Southern Oregon	4–5	3–3	3rd	
1973	Southern Oregon	6–3	4–2	T–2nd	
1974	Southern Oregon	6–4	3–3	T–4th	
1975	Southern Oregon	6–4	3–3	T–3rd	
1976	Southern Oregon	3–6	2–4	5th	
1977	Southern Oregon	3–6	2–4	5th	
1978	Southern Oregon	4–5 (Note: Southern Oregon finished the 1978 with an overall record of 3–6 and a mark of 2–4 in conference play, tying for fifth place in the Evergreen Conference. In January 1979, Central Washington forfeited its three wins, including its victory over Southern Oregon, from 1978 because of ineligible player.)	3–3	T–3rd	
1979	Southern Oregon	2–7	1–4	T–5th	
Southern Oregon:		34–40	21–26		
Total:		34–40			
