= Jean Eberhart =

American football coach (1909–1976)

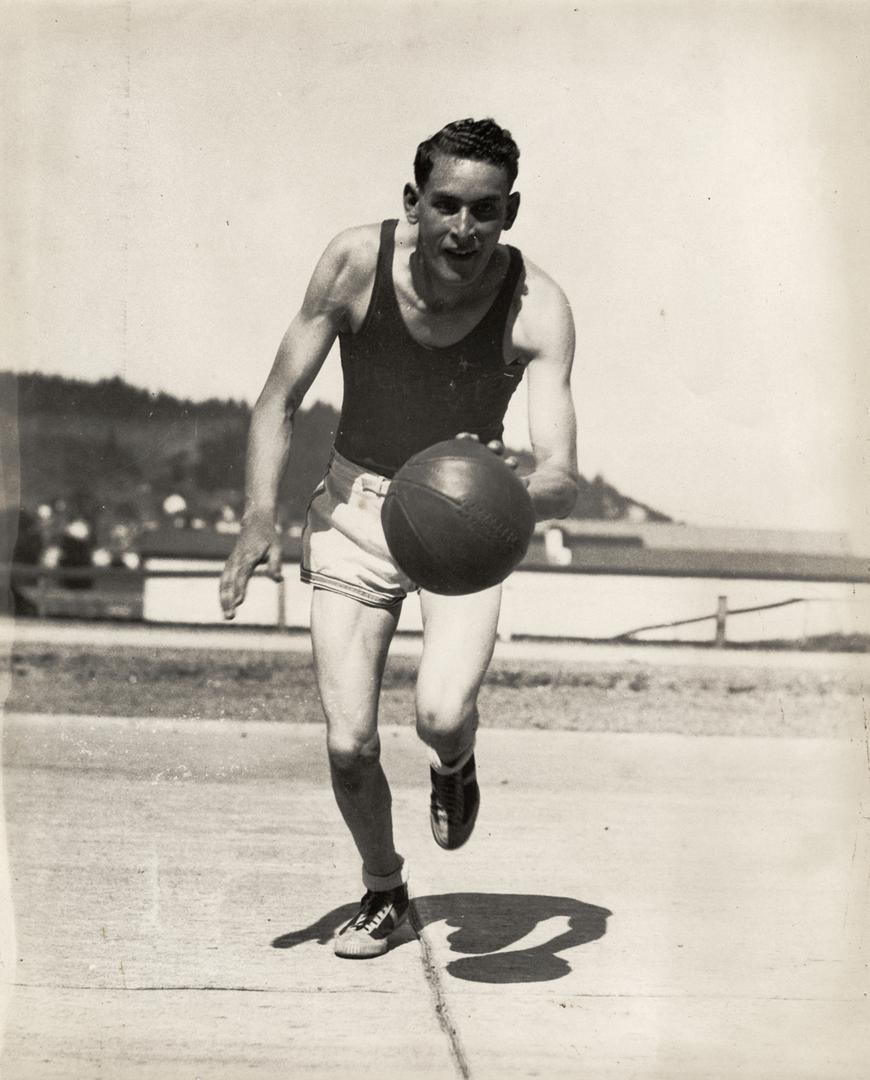
- Eberhart in McArthur Court, 1929

Biographical details
- Born: October 20, 1909; Ohio, U.S.
- Died: January 3, 1971 (aged 61); Jackson County, Oregon, U.S.
- Education: University of Oregon (1931)

Coaching career (HC unless noted)

Football
- 1935–1938: Southern Oregon Normal

Basketball
- 1935–1943: Southern Oregon Normal

Head coaching record
- Overall: 4–17–3 (football); 123–74 (basketball)

Jean F. Eberhart (October 20, 1909 – January 3, 1976) was an American football coach. He was served as the head football coach at Southern Oregon Normal School—now known as Southern Oregon University—in Ashland, Oregon for four seasons, from 1935 until 1938, compiling a record of 4–17–3.

== Head coaching record ==
=== Football ===
| Year | Team | Overall | Conference | Standing | Bowl/playoffs |
|---|---|---|---|---|---|
Southern Oregon Normal (Independent) (1935–1938)
| 1935 | Southern Oregon Normal | 1–6 | | | |
| 1936 | Southern Oregon Normal | 3–2–1 | | | |
| 1937 | Southern Oregon Normal | 0–4–2 | | | |
| 1938 | Southern Oregon Normal | 0–5 | | | |
| Southern Oregon Normal: | | 4–17–3 | | | |
| Total: | | 4–17–3 | | | |
