= Carlsbad High School (California) =

Public secondary school in Carlsbad, California, United States

Coordinates: 33°9′45.41″N 117°19′43.96″W

Location
- 3557 Lancer Way; Carlsbad, California 92008; United States

Information
- Type: Public
- Established: 1957
- School district: Carlsbad Unified School District
- Principal: Julia Redfield
- Teaching staff: 98.15 (on an FTE basis)
- Enrollment: 2,336 (2024–2025)
- Student to teacher ratio: 23.80
- Campus: Suburban
- Colors: Purple, Black, White, and Gold
- Fight song: "Minnesota Rouser"
- Athletics: CIF San Diego Section, Avocado West League
- Mascot: Lancer
- Newspaper: Lancer Express
- Yearbook: Purple Shield
- Website: https://chs.carlsbadusd.net/

Carlsbad High School is a public high school in Carlsbad, California.

== History ==
As an aftermath of World War II and the subsequent baby boom, Carlsbad's population skyrocketed and there became a sudden need for more schools. In 1955, voters in Oceanside and Carlsbad voted and approved a $1.26 million construction bond that funded the building of Carlsbad's first public high school. Carlsbad High School first opened in 1957. It underwent major redevelopment from 2009 to 2012. In 2010, the Academic Performance Index for the school was 812. Before construction of the high school, most students in Carlsbad went to the combined Oceanside Carlsbad High School, which was founded in 1906.

In December 2001, the band No Doubt played a surprise concert at the high school as the first episode of the MTV show "Jammed." Students were not told of the concert until they were dismissed from class for the day. MTV staff worked with school administrators and staff to facilitate the concert between the football field and gymnasium.

Governor Arnold Schwarzenegger visited the high school on August 11, 2006 to announce his plans for the future of funding and education in California's schools.

On February 19, 2016, the band Echosmith played a concert for the school as part of the State Farm #Drive2N2 campaign. The school won the concert as a result of a safe driving video submitted by the broadcasting department to the contest. The broadcasting department received a $100,000 grant for winning.

== Campus ==
Originally built more than fifty years ago, the campus has undergone renovation and construction on a new campus. The school's address was 3557 Monroe until it was changed to Lancer Way about 15 years ago. The school started out with just two buildings called the 100 building and the 200 building. Renovation for the whole campus began in 2008 with the construction of a new football field and stadium. The new 'Swede Krcmar Field' opened March 2010. Newly built classrooms were occupied by classes beginning January 9, 2012. The world famous skate landmark, the Carlsbad Gap, was deconstructed on February 23, 2012. Renovation was completed in May 2012.

== Enrollment ==
Based on a 2019-20 survey, the total number of students enrolled at Carlsbad High is 2,404 students. There were 3 students in grade 8, 598 in 9th, 570 in 10th, 637 in 11th, and 596 in 12th. The student body is 57% White, 30.2% Hispanic or Latino, 6.3% two or more races, 4.6% Asian, and <2% other. In 2023, niche.com reports 2,287 students in grades 9-12 and a student-teacher ratio of 23 to 1.

== Achievements, awards, distinctions ==
Men's basketball

- 2017 - Men's Soccer Team wins 300th game.
- 2016 - Men's Volleyball San Diego Section Open Division Crown.
- 2012 - Men's Cross Country Team won two consecutive Cif Championships, 3rd in California State Championship 2012, and 18th at Nike Cross Nationals 2012.

5 time cif san diego basketball champion, open division 2024, d1, 2000, 2002, 2022, d2 2019 class 3a 1961,

- Home to the nationally acclaimed and award-winning CHSTV Home.
- 2002, 2005 and 2006 CIF San Diego Section Football Division I Championship.
- CIF-record eight consecutive Division 1 Men's Water Polo Championships (2003, 2004, 2005, 2006, 2007, 2008, 2009, 2010, 2013, and 2014)
- Men's Swimming & Diving CIF Champions: 2003, 2004, 2005, 2006, 2007, 2008, 2009, 2010, 2013, 2014
- National Champion Lancer Dancers Carlsbad Lancer Dancers Dance (2024 - 2025) | Blast Athletics. UDA National Titles include:
  - 2001 - Large Varsity Jazz
  - 2002 - Large Varsity Jazz, ESPN TV Challenge
  - 2003 - Large Varsity Jazz
  - 2004 - Small Varsity Hip Hop
  - 2006 - Small Varsity Hip Hop AND Small Varsity Jazz
  - 2007 - Small Varsity Jazz
  - 2011 - Small Varsity Hip Hop
- 2006- Show Choir (Sound Express) placed first at Hart High School Competition.
- 2012 - Show Choir (Encore) placed first at SoCal Show Choir Invitational.
- 2013 - Show Choir (Encore) placed first at SoCal Show Choir Invitational.
- 2014 - Show Choir (Encore) placed first at SoCal Show Choir Invitational.
- 2016 - Show Choir (Sound Express) placed fourth in the Advanced Mixed division at the Southern California Show Choir Invitational.
- Home to the famous Carlsbad Gap, a street skateboarding attraction popularized in skate videos and magazines. Carlsbad High School is featured in Tony Hawk 's Pro Skater 2 video game, where the gap is a skateboard obstacle.
- Carlsbad High School Television
    - 2006, 2009, 2010, 2011, 2012, 2013, 2014, 2015, 2016, 2017, 2018, 2019, 2020, 2021, 2022 and 2023 winner of the prestigious STN Award of Excellence from the Student Television Network (STN)
  - CHSTV is recognized across the country as a model for scholastic broadcast journalism.
  - Was the winner of the STN's "Best Daily Newscast in the Nation" from 2008 to 2023.
- Carlsbad High School Art Department
  - 2014 – Top 5 Finalist in the national Vans Custom Culture art competition, earning $4,000 for the art department.
  - 2015 – Grand Prize winner, "Local Attitude" design winner, and "Truth Campaign Skateboard Deck" winner in the Vans Custom Culture art competition, totaling $75,000 in winnings for the school's art department amongst the three prizes.
- Band
  - As Marching Lancers
    - 2003-2006 - Top-ranked band in San Diego County
    - 2005 - SCSBOA Class 5A Field Show Champions
    - 2009 - SCSBOA Class 3A Field Show Champions
    - 2010 - SCSBOA Class 3A Field Show Champions
  - As Wind Symphony
    - 2004 - First high school band to perform at Carnegie Hall
    - 2006 - 1st place in festival held at the Kennedy Center in Washington DC
    - 2010 - Unanimous Superior Ranking at Heritage Festival of Gold, held in Orchestra Hall, Chicago
    - The Wind Symphony achieved a Unanimous Superior ranking (the highest ranking possible) at all the competitions it attended between 1999 and 2013.
    - The Wind Symphony has been invited to perform at the Sydney Opera House in Sydney, Australia, every year since 2004, but has declined each year, lacking funds for such a trip.
  - Drumline
    - 2009 - 7th place at WGI World Percussion Championships in Dayton, Ohio
    - 2015 - 2nd place A-Class at SCPA Championship Finals in San Bernardino, California
    - 2018 - 3rd place Scholastic-A at WGI West Power Regional Finals in San Bernardino, California.
    - 2022 - 2nd place A-Class at SCPA Championship Finals in Ontario, California
  - Color Guard
    - 2011 - WGASC Champions
- Speech and Debate
  - National Qualifiers 2008–2013
  - Tournament of Champions qualifiers in multiple debates
- Carlsbad High School Chamber Orchestra
  - 2011 March 12 - SCSBOA Superior Unanimous @ El Camino High School

Fall 2011- Technical Theater won 1st place for their Set and Lighting design at DTASC. 1989 Boys Baseball CIF Champions

== Notable alumni ==
- Brady Anderson, baseball; Baltimore Orioles
- Joey Beltran, professional Mixed Martial Artist, formerly with the UFC,
- Colin Branch, football; Stanford University and Carolina Panthers
- Sean Canfield, football; Oregon State and New Orleans Saints
- Brandon Chillar, football; UCLA and Green Bay Packers
- Jonathan Compas, football; UC Davis and Tampa Bay Buccaneers; New England Patriots
- Lauren Fendrick, Olympic beach volleyball player
- Luke Ferrelli, football; California
- Noelle Freeman, Miss California 2011
- Troy Glaus, Major League Baseball player, won World Series with the Anaheim Angels (now the Los Angeles Angels of Anaheim) in 2002
- iDubbbz, YouTuber
- Nia Jax, professional wrestler for WWE
- Ted Johnson, football; University of Colorado and New England Patriots
- Scott Karl, baseball; Milwaukee Brewers, Colorado Rockies
- Michael Knorr, baseball: Houston Astros organization
- Taylor Knox, professional surfer
- Glen Kozlowski, football; Chicago Bears
- Michelle Laine, costume designer
- Bryan Lee-Lauduski, American football player
- Zack Marshall, college football tight end for the Michigan Wolverines
- Selema Masekela, actor and commentator
- Vanessa Nygaard, Stanford Women’s Basketball, WNBA Player and Coach
- Autumn Reeser, actress
- Cordano Russell, professional and Olympic skateboarder
- Aidan Sayin, football player
- Julian Sayin football player
- Vic So'oto, football; BYU and Green Bay Packers
- Staciana Stitts, Olympic gold medal swimmer
- Robert Stromberg, Academy Award-winning film director and art director
- Brett Swain, NFL player
- Asa Turner, college football player
- Shaun White, Olympic gold medal snowboarder
