= Geoffrey Olsen =

Welsh artist (1943–2007)

- Born: Geoffrey Robert Olsen; 4 November 1943; Merthyr Tydfil
- Died: 6 December 2007 (aged 64); Gloucester
- Education: Newport College of Art West of England College of Art; Cardiff College of Art Academy of Fine Arts, Munich
- Known for: Painting; Artist books
- Awards: Abbey Award in Painting from the British School in Rome

Geoffrey Olsen (4 November 1943 – 6 December 2007) was a Welsh artist from Merthyr Tydfil, who spent time living in the Cotswolds, Rome, Florence and Miami.

== Life and career ==
Born Geoffrey Robert Olsen in Merthyr Tydfil on 4 November 1943. He attended Cyfarthfa Grammar School, set within Cyfarthfa Castle, the former mansion of iron-master family the Crawshays. He later attended Newport College of Art, the West of England College of Art, Cardiff College of Art and the Academy of Fine Arts, Munich.

From 1993 Olsen became the Principal Lecturer in Visual Arts at Oxford Brookes University, becoming Senior Lecturer in Fine Art in 1997 – 2001. In 1996 he also became Artist in Residence at Florida International University before teaching on the MFA course in Visual Arts. From 1999–2000 he was artist in residence at Cheltenham Art Gallery & Museum.

He was diagnosed with leukaemia in 2003, but continued to paint. He died in Gloucester 6 December 2007.

== Exhibiting ==
Olsen exhibited widely from the 1970s including exhibitions at the Museum of Modern Art, Wales, the National Library of Wales, the British School in Rome and Florida International University. His work was also included in a number of group exhibitions, including "Painting the Dragon" at the National Museum of Wales, the "Wales Drawing Biennale 2000" at the Glynn Vivian Art Gallery, the 1992 National Eisteddfod of Wales in Aberystwyth, the Museum of Modern Art, Oxford, Ikon Gallery, Camden Arts Centre, the Corcoran Museum of Art and other locations in Europe and the US.

== Artwork ==
Olsen's artwork uses abstracted geographical forms and memory from the places he knew best, including Merthyr Tydfil, the Cotswolds, Rome, Florence and Miami. Together with painting, during his later life in Miami, he also worked on producing books in collaboration with the writer Jerome Fletcher using both hyper-text and conventional narratives.

Poet, art historian and critic Tony Curtis described his collaborative artist book with the bookbinder David Sellars, as "one of the outstanding artists' books of recent years". The book combined images of Florence alongside those of Merthyr Tydfil, using laser prints, screen-printing and acrylic paint on Khādī paper.

His work is held in a number of collections including Cheltenham Art Gallery & Museum, Russell-Cotes Art Gallery & Museum, University of Southampton and Gloucestershire Hospitals NHS Foundation Trust.
