= 2006 Humboldt State Lumberjacks football team =

American college football season

2006 Humboldt State Lumberjacks football
- Conference: Independent
- Record: 9–1
- Head coach: Doug Adkins (7th season)
- Defensive coordinator: Shay McClure (1st season)
- Home stadium: Redwood Bowl

2006 NCAA Division II Northwest Region independents football records
	Conf.			Overall
Team	W		L	W		L
Humboldt State		–		9	–	1
Mary @		–		6	–	4
Western Oregon		–		6	–	4
Dixie State @#		–		1	–	10
@ – NCAA Provisional Division II member # – Dixie Rotary Bowl participant

The 2006 Humboldt State Lumberjacks football team represented Humboldt State University—now known as California State Polytechnic University, Humboldt—as an independent during the 2006 NCAA Division II football season. Led seventh-year head coach Doug Adkins, the Lumberjacks compiled a record of 9–1. The team outscored its opponents 324 to 194 for the season. Humboldt State played home games at the Redwood Bowl in Arcata, California.

The Great Northwest Athletic Conference (GNAC) did not sponsor football for the 2006 and 2007 seasons.

== Schedule ==
Date	Opponent	Site	Result
August 31	Western Washington	Redwood Bowl; Arcata, CA	W 28–23
September 9	Central Washington	Redwood Bowl; Arcata, CA	L 0–20
September 23	at Dixie State	Hansen Stadium; St. George, UT	W 48–28
September 30	Southern Oregon	Redwood Bowl; Arcata, CA	W 30–13
October 7	at Western Oregon	McArthur Field; Monmouth, OR	W 29–21
October 14	at Azusa Pacific	Cougar Athletic Stadium; Azusa, CA	W 31–24
October 21	Dixie State	Redwood Bowl; Arcata, CA	W 45–7
October 28	at Texas College	Trinity Mother Frances Rose Stadium; Tyler, TX	W 55–21
November 4	at Southern Oregon	Fuller Field; Ashland, OR	W 35–17
November 11	Western Oregon	Redwood Bowl; Arcata, CA	W 23–20
