= Zack Moore (American football) =

American football player and coach

Playing career
- 1997–1998: Morehead State
- Position: Linebacker

Coaching career (HC unless noted)
- 1999–2000: Morehead State (DE)
- 2001: Morehead State (WR)
- 2002–2003: Morehead State (LB)
- 2004–2006: Morehead State (DB)
- 2007–2008: Kentucky Christian (DC)
- 2009–2010: Kentucky Christian
- 2011–2014: East Carter HS (KY)
- 2015: Morehead State (LB)
- 2016–2017: Morehead State (DC/LB)

Head coaching record
- Overall: 1–21 (college)

Zack Moore is an American former college football coach and former player. He was defensive coordinator at Morehead State University from 2016 to 2017. Moore served at the head football coach at Kentucky Christian University from 2009 to 2010, compiling a record of 1–21. He was head football coach at East Carter High School in Grayson, Kentucky from 2011 to 2014.

== Head coaching record ==
=== College ===
Year	Team	Overall	Conference	Standing	Bowl/playoffs
Kentucky Christian Knights (Mid-South Conference) (2009–2010)
2009	Kentucky Christian	1–10	1–5	6th (West)	
2010	Kentucky Christian	0–11	0–6	7th (East)	
Kentucky Christian:		1–21	1–11		
Total:		1–21			
