= Bryan Lee-Lauduski =

American football player (born 1984)

No. 15
- Position: Quarterback

Personal information
- Born: January 3, 1984 (age 42); San Diego, California, U.S.
- Listed height: 6 ft 4 in (1.93 m)
- Listed weight: 210 lb (95 kg)

Career information
- High school: Carlsbad (Carlsbad, California)
- College: UC Davis (2004–2005); Southern Oregon (2006–2008)
- NFL draft: 2009: undrafted

Career history
- Iowa Barnstormers (2009, 2011)

Career AFL statistics
- Comp. / Att.: 107 / 169
- Passing yards: 1,273
- TD–INT: 24–12
- Passer rating: 92.15
- Rushing TDs: 1
- Stats at ArenaFan.com

Bryan Lee-Lauduski (born January 3, 1984) is an American former professional football quarterback who played one season with the Iowa Barnstormers of the Arena Football League (AFL). He played college football at the University of California, Davis and Southern Oregon University.

== Early life ==
Lee-Lauduski was born on January 3, 1984, in San Diego, California. He played high school football at Carlsbad High School in Carlsbad, California. He was named All-Conference his senior year.

== College career ==
Lee-Lauduski played for the UC Davis Aggies of the University of California, Davis from 2004 to 2005. He played for the Southern Oregon Raiders of Southern Oregon University from 2006 to 2008. He started all nine games for the Raiders in 2007, completed 187 of 336 passes for 2,083 yards and 17 touchdowns. In 2008, Lee-Lauduski was named to the pre-season NAIA All-Independent second team. He majored in criminal justice.

== Professional career ==
Lee-Lauduski played for the Iowa Barnstormers of the af2 in 2009 and spent most of the year inactive following an early season injury. He signed with the Barnstormers for the 2011 Arena Football League season in October 2010 after a year away from the team.
