= Craig Howard =

American football player and coach (1952–2017)

Biographical details
- Born: January 29, 1952; Klamath Falls, Oregon, U.S.
- Died: January 20, 2017 (aged 64); Ashland, Oregon, U.S.

Playing career
- 1970–1973: Linfield

Coaching career (HC unless noted)
- 1978–1981: Oregon Tech (DC)
- 1982–1983: Portland State (DC)
- 1987–1989: Oregon Tech (DC)
- 1990–1992: Oregon Tech
- 1993: Livingston (DC)
- 2003–2007: Allen D. Nease HS (FL)
- 2008–2010: Columbia HS (FL)
- 2011–2016: Southern Oregon

Head coaching record
- Overall: 56–44 (college); 76–23 (high school)
- Tournaments: 8–2 (NAIA playoffs)

Accomplishments and honors

Championships
- 1 NAIA (2014); 1 Frontier (2012)

Craig Howard (January 29, 1952 – January 20, 2017) was an American football coach and former player. At the time of his death he was head football coach at Southern Oregon University, a position he had held since 2011. Howard served as the head football coach at Oregon Institute of Technology from 1990 until 1992, when the school dropped its football program. He was later a high school coach of Heisman Trophy winner Tim Tebow at Allen D. Nease High School in Ponte Vedra, Florida, where his team won the high school state championship. He led the Southern Oregon Raiders to the NAIA Football National Championship in 2014.

In 2017, Howard died at his home at the age of 64.

== Head coaching record ==
=== College ===
| Year | Team | Overall | Conference | Standing | Bowl/playoffs | NAIA^{#} |
|---|---|---|---|---|---|---|
Oregon Tech Hustlin' Owls (Columbia Football Association) (1990–1992)
| 1990 | Oregon Tech | 1–8 | 1–5 | T–6th (Mount Hood) | | |
| 1991 | Oregon Tech | 3–6 | 3–3 | 4th (Mount Hood) | | |
| 1992 | Oregon Tech | 2–7 | 2–4 | T–5th (Mount Hood) | | |
| Oregon Tech: | | 6–21 | 6–12 | | | |
Southern Oregon Raiders (NAIA independent) (2011)
| 2011 | Southern Oregon | 5–5 | | | | |
Southern Oregon Raiders (Frontier Conference) (2012–2016)
| 2012 | Southern Oregon | 9–3 | 8–2 | T–1st | L NAIA Quarterfinal | 5 |
| 2013 | Southern Oregon | 7–4 | 7–3 | T–2nd | | 24 |
| 2014 | Southern Oregon | 13–2 | 8–2 | 2nd | W NAIA Championship | 1 |
| 2015 | Southern Oregon | 11–3 | 8–2 | 2nd | L NAIA Championship | 2 |
| 2016 | Southern Oregon | 5–6 | 5–5 | 4th | | |
| Southern Oregon: | | 50–23 | 36–14 | | | |
| Total: | | 56–44 | | | | |
National championship Conference title Conference division title or championship game berth
^{#}Rankings from final NAIA Coaches' Poll.
