= Clare Helminiak =

Clare Helminiak is a rear admiral (retired) in the United States Public Health Service Commissioned Corps. She served as the Chief Medical Officer and Assistant Surgeon General of the United States Public Health Service.

== Biography ==
Helminiak received her M.D. from the Medical College of Wisconsin in 1982. The following year, she completed her internship at Michigan State University. In 1998, she received her M.P.H. from the Medical College of Wisconsin.

Helminiak joined the Corps in 1983 in Mescalero, New Mexico as General Medical Officer. From 1984 to 1988, she served at the Alaska Native Medical Center as General Pediatric Officer and Assistant Director of the Alaska Area Native Health Service Hepatitis B Program.

After being a member of the Inactive Reserve from 1988 to 1990, Helminiak returned to active duty in Parker, Arizona as Senior Medical Officer and later Clinical Director of the Colorado River Service Unit. Later, she worked on-site in Kabul, Afghanistan on a maternal/child health care reconstruction project for the United States Department of Defense and the United States Department of Health and Human Services.

In 2006, she was responsible for the transfer of the National Disaster Medical System to the Department of Health and Human Services from the United States Department of Homeland Security and the Federal Emergency Management Agency and served as Team Leader for Rapid Deployment Force #5.

From 2007 to 2009, Helminiak, served in the Office of the Vice President of the United States. Her duties included direct interface between the Office of the Vice President with the staffs of the Homeland Security Council and the National Security Council. She later became Deputy Director for Medical Surge in the Office of Preparedness and Emergency Operations of the Office of Public Health Emergency Preparedness and Chief Professional Officer for the Medical Category.

She is a former board member of the Military Officers Association of America.

Awards she has received include the Vice Presidential Service Badge and the Public Health Service Achievement Medal.

In 2022, Medical College of Wisconsin bestowed an honorary doctorate on Helminiak.
