= Paul Mierkiewicz =

American football coach

Coaching career (HC unless noted)
- 1992–1998: Loras (assistant)
- 1999–2000: Hastings (OC)
- 2001–2010: Hastings
- 2011–2013: Loras
- 2015–2018: McPherson

Head coaching record
- Overall: 76–88
- Tournaments: 1–2 (NAIA playoffs)

Paul Mierkiewicz is an American former college football coach. He was the head football coach at Hastings College from 2001 to 2010, Loras College from 2011 to 2013, and McPherson College in McPherson, Kansas from 2015 to 2018, compiling a career coaching record of 76–88.

== Head coaching record ==
Year	Team	Overall	Conference	Standing	Bowl/playoffs	NAIA^{#}
Hastings Broncos (Great Plains Athletic Conference) (2001–2010)
2001	Hastings	8–2	6–2	3rd		18
2002	Hastings	7–3	5–3	T–3rd		24
2003	Hastings	6–4	6–4	T–3rd		
2004	Hastings	9–3	8–2	T–2nd	L NAIA Quarterfinal	8
2005	Hastings	4–6	4–6	T–6th		
2006	Hastings	4–6	4–6	T–6th		
2007	Hastings	6–5	5–5	5th		
2008	Hastings	7–4	6–4	5th		
2009	Hastings	9–3	8–2	3rd	L NAIA First Round	13
2010	Hastings	5–5	5–5	T–5th		
Hastings:		65–41	57–39			
Loras Duhawks (Iowa Intercollegiate Athletic Conference) (2011–2013)
2011	Loras	1–9	0–8	9th		
2012	Loras	2–8	1–6	7th		
2013	Loras	1–6	0–4			
Loras:		4–23	1–18			
McPherson Bulldogs (Kansas Collegiate Athletic Conference) (2015–2018)
2015	McPherson	0–10	0–9	10th		
2016	McPherson	1–10	1–8	T–9th		
2017	McPherson	3–7	2–7	9th		
2018	McPherson	3–7	3–7	T–8th		
McPherson:		7–34	6–31			
Total:		76–88				
