= Kentucky Christian Knights football =

- First season: 2008; 18 years ago
- Head coach: Jason Aubry; 3rd season, 7–25 (.219)
- Location: Grayson, Kentucky
- Stadium: KCU Field (capacity: 1,000)
- Conference: Mid-South Conference
- Division: Bluegrass
- Colors: Red and Black
- All-time record: 47–113 (.294)
- Outfitter: Nike
- Website: KCUKnights.com

The KCU Knights football program represents Kentucky Christian University in college football. They are football-only members of Mid-South Conference of the National Association of Intercollegiate Athletics (NAIA). The Knights have played their home games at KCU Field since the inception of their football team in 2008.

== History ==
Beginning in 2008, the Knights began competing in football in the Mid-South Conference (MSC). In their first football season, the Knights finished 1–9 overall, with no conference games played. The Knights were coached by Dane Damron, in his only season as head coach in Mid-South Conference play. The Knight sole win—and first win in school history—would come against Trinity Bible College by a score of 50–6. Damron left at the end of the 2008 season for Virginia–Wise Highland as a strength and conditioning coach.

The Knights would hire former assistant Morehead State coach Zack Moore to replace Damron, beginning in the 2009 season. Moore would coach the Knights for two seasons, finishing with an overall record of 1–21; the Knights finished sixth and seventh in their conference, each year, respectively. Following the culmination of the 2010 season, Kentucky Christian University (KCU) Athletics would relieve Moore of his head coaching duties.

Following the 2010 season, KCU Athletics would hire former NFL wide receiver Mike Furrey, as the new head coach for the Knights. Furrey would lead the Knights to their best overall season record of 7–4 during the 2012 season; he would finish his two-year tenure as head coach with an 11–11 overall record. Furrey would resign his position as Knights head coach on February 20, 2013, to become wide receivers coach for Marshall University.

After the departure of Furrey in early 2013, the Knights would hire former Fleming County High School head coach Gene Peterson to the same position with KCU starting in the 2013 season. Peterson would compile an 8–14 overall record in two years as head coach. Peterson would leave KCU following the 2014 season.

KCU Athletics then hired former McKendree Bearcats defensive coordinator Steve Barrows as the new head coach for the 2015 season. During Barrows' two-year tenure with the Knights, he finished with an 8–14 overall record.

Following Barrows' resignation on January 7, 2017, the Knights replaced him with former Missouri State offensive coordinator Corey Fipps starting in the 2017 season.

== Facilities ==
=== KCU Field ===
Built for the Knights to begin their play at the start of the 2008 season, KCU field was constructed by funds from the university. The stadium utilizes a turf field and has a capacity of 1,000.

== Head coaches ==
Coach	Years	Seasons	Record	Pct	Bowls
Dane Damron	2008	1	1–9	.100	
Zack Moore	2009–2010	2	1–21	.045	
Mike Furrey	2011–2012	2	11–11	.500	
Gene Peterson	2013–2014	2	8–14	.364	
Steve Barrows	2015–2016	2	8–14	.364	
Corey Fipps	2017–2020	4	12–29	.293	
Jake Russell	2021–2022	2	6–16	.273	
Jason Aubry	2023–present	2	3–19	.136	
