= Southern Oregon Raiders =

- University: Southern Oregon University
- Nickname: Raiders
- Association: NAIA
- Conference: CCC (primary); Frontier (football); Independent (wrestling)
- Athletic director: Matt Sayre
- Location: Ashland, Oregon
- Varsity teams: 20
- Football stadium: Raider Stadium
- Basketball arena: Lithia Motors Pavilion
- Softball stadium: Softball Complex
- Soccer stadium: University Field
- Colors: Red and black
- Mascot: Red-tailed hawk
- Website: souraiders.com
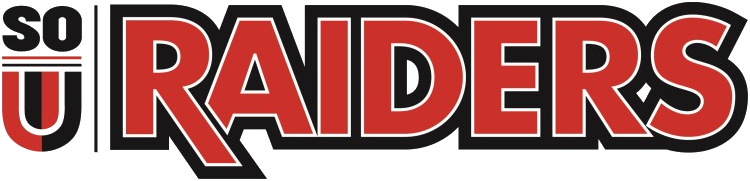

The Southern Oregon Raiders are the athletic teams that represent Southern Oregon University, located in Ashland, Oregon, in intercollegiate sports as a member of the National Association of Intercollegiate Athletics (NAIA), primarily competing in the Cascade Collegiate Conference (CCC) for most of its sports since the 1993–94 academic year; while its football team competes in the Frontier Conference.

== History ==
Southern Oregon University adopted the nickname "Red Raiders" for its sports teams in 1946. The name was in reference to the abundant Native American tribe, the Modoc people, that had existed in Southern Oregon. In 1980 "Red" was removed from the nickname. The red-tailed hawk was adopted in 1998 to appease campus groups calling for a mascot and still respecting the Native American culture. The athletics logo of Southern Oregon has been through 7 editions, the most recent coming in 2011.

== Varsity teams ==
Southern Oregon competes in 20 intercollegiate varsity sports:

Men's sports	Women's sports
Basketball	Basketball
Cross country	Beach volleyball
Football	Cross country
Golf	Golf
Soccer	Soccer
Track and field	Softball
Wrestling	Track and field
	Volleyball
	Wrestling

== Championships ==
All NAIA titles:

=== National championships ===
Sport	Titles	Winning years
Football	1	2014
Cross country (men's)	2	2010, 2016
Wrestling	4	1978, 1983, 1994, 2001
Softball	4	2019, 2021, 2023, 2025

=== Conference championships ===
Sport	Titles	Winning years
Basketball (men's)	2	1998–99, 2004–05
Basketball (women's)	8	1992–93, 1997–98, 1998–99, 2001–02, 2002–03, 2007–08, 2015–16, 2024-25
Cross country (men's)	13	2004, 2005, 2008, 2009, 2010, 2011, 2012, 2013, 2014, 2015, 2016, 2018, 2023
Football	13	1946, 1947, 1948, 1955, 1957, 1961, 1962, 1964, 1965, 1983, 1990, 2001, 2012
Soccer (men's)	1	2017-18
Softball	8	2003, 2004, 2005, 2016, 2018, 2019, 2021, 2025
Track & field (men's)	9	2000, 2001, 2002, 2004, 2005, 2013, 2014, 2016, 2017
Track & field (women's)	3	2000, 2001, 2002
Volleyball	9	1991, 2003, 2004, 2005, 2007, 2009, 2010, 2011, 2024

== Facilities ==
=== Raider Stadium ===
Raider Stadium was built in 1983 and cost $1.55 million and is the home venue for Southern Oregon's American football and track and field teams. The stadium seats 4,000 with a covered grandstand on the west side of the field and risers on the east side. The field at the stadium, named Fuller Field after John Fuller, has been the home field of the Raiders' football team since 1955. In 1999 the Meyer Fitness Center, which lies under the grandstand, was renovated to include a second floor, effectively doubling the floor space available for use.

=== McNeal Pavilion ===
Completed in 1957, McNeal Pavilion played host to both men's and women's basketball, women's volleyball and wrestling. The first of two changes to McNeal occurred in 1990 when the seating in the main arena was doubled to 1,400 during a complete building renovation. The second change happened during the 1998–99 season and involved resurfacing the gym floor and installing 550 new seat-backs for the seats on the east side of the gym. McNeal Pavilion also included a swimming pool, racquetball courts, a rock climbing gym, and training rooms. McNeal was torn down in 2016.

=== Lithia Motors Pavilion ===
Completed in 2018, the Lithia Motors Pavilion is in the same building as the Student Recreation Center. The Bob Rheim Arena in the pavilion is home to basketball, volleyball, and wrestling.

=== University Field ===
Behind the scoreboard at Raider Stadium lies University Field. Used from 2000 until 2014 for women's soccer, the field used risers as its sole type of seating. Soccer has been played at Raider Stadium since 2014.

=== Softball Complex ===
Softball Complex, formerly a baseball field, is used solely for softball, as the University does not play baseball, since the program was reinstated in 2000 after a 17-year hiatus. In 2026, the field and stands were redone and are now referred to as Laurel Park.
