= Southern Oregon Raiders football =

Southern Oregon University sports team

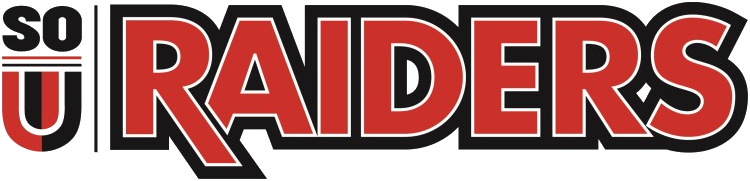
- First season: 1927; 99 years ago
- Head coach: Berk Brown; 3rd season, 17–14 (.548)
- Location: Ashland, Oregon
- Stadium: Raider Stadium (capacity: 5,000)
- League: NAIA
- Conference: Frontier Conference
- Colors: Red and black
- All-time record: 349–351–15 (.499)

NAIA national championships
- 2014

Conference championships
- 13
- Consensus All-Americans: 23 (NAIA)
- Rivalries: Montana Tech, Carroll College, Western Oregon
- Mascot: Red-Tailed Hawk
- Website: souraiders.com/football

The Southern Oregon Raiders football team represents Southern Oregon University in the sport of American football. The Raiders team competes in the National Association of Intercollegiate Athletics (NAIA) as an associate member of the Frontier Conference. Southern Oregon University has fielded an official football team since 1927 and has an all-time record of 349–351–15 (a .499 winning percentage). (Note: The Southern Oregon Raiders' official record is taken from the university's official statistics, which may not align with those from other sources.) The Raiders play in Raider Stadium in Ashland, Oregon, which has a capacity of 5,000. Southern Oregon has played in two NAIA national championship games, winning one, and have won thirteen conference championships in multiple conferences.

The Raiders have been successful in the twenty-first century, participating in the NAIA championship tournament four times. Twenty-three Raiders players have been named first-team NAIA All-Americans and two were named to Academic All-America teams. There have been two Southern Oregon players selected in the NFL draft, one of which, Jeff Beathard, was the 1988 draft's Mr. Irrelevant. Thirty-eight Raiders players have been inducted into the university's athletic Hall of Fame, as have three individual football teams. The primary colors for the program are black and red. The school's mascot is a red-tailed hawk. Southern Oregon has long-standing rivalries with three of their current conference opponents: Montana Tech, Carroll College, and Western Oregon.

== History ==
=== Early beginnings through World War II: 1927–1945 ===
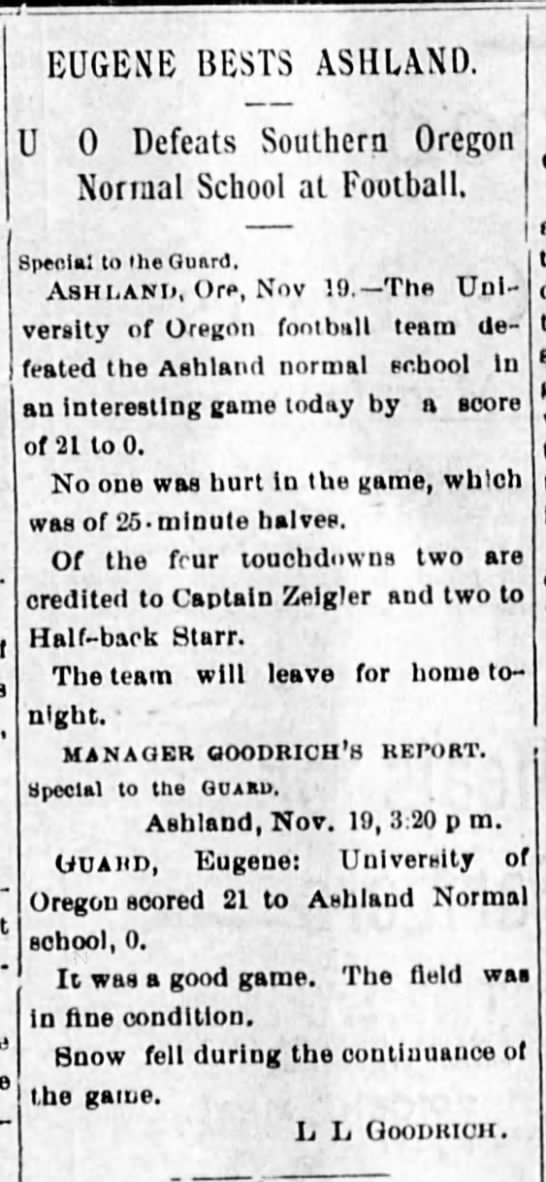
A newspaper article about the school's game against the University of Oregon

The first iteration of football at Southern Oregon University came in 1896, when the school was a small teachers' college known as Southern Oregon State Normal School (SONS). A student at the school, John Berry, set up a game between a group of people from the school and the Ashland Athletic Club, a team he set up for the match. In front of a large crowd, the SONS team won, 18–0. The sport developed at the school over the next few years. Games were played against nearby high schools, primarily Ashland High School. In 1899 and 1900, contests were set up with the University of Oregon Webfoots, a major regional team; SONS was shut out in both contests. In 1900, a school professor organized the program and led it to relative success. However, funding for the school was stopped and it closed in 1909.

The school reopened in 1926 on a new campus with only one building. Roy McNeal, a coach who had been moderately successful at the University of Puget Sound, was hired as football coach and athletic director for the college in 1927. The school had no athletic facilities and very few male students at the time; the university president had pushed for a football program as a way to bring in more students. A playing field was leveled by a highway crew working nearby and uniforms were purchased for the players. Three games against local colleges were scheduled, the last of which marked the beginning of a rivalry with the Oregon Normal School, which was later renamed Western Oregon University. SONS shutout their first two opponents and defeated the Oregon Normal School 19–12, giving them an undefeated season and the unofficial title of Oregon teachers' colleges champion.

In its second season, the college won only one match in a five-game schedule. However, more significant than that was the death of star freshman Max Newsom; he died shortly after a game against Oregon State JV from cerebral hemorrhaging after collapsing on the field from injuries sustained making a tackle. Newsom was the only Southern Oregon player ever killed during a game. The 1929 season saw slight improvement behind the efforts of Cylde Hines, SONS's first African American student. While Hines was accepted by the school, segregation and racist attitudes from opposing fans created problems for the team. The actions shown to the team by rival Oregon Normal School led McNeal to suspend competition between the schools for two years. McNeal guided the program to winning seasons the following two years, including an unbeaten record in the latter. Before the start of the 1932 season, McNeal retired from the coaching position and took a job as professor of geography at the school. Howard Hobson, a high-school basketball coach, was hired to fill McNeal's positions. He apparently lacked any knowledge of the sport and was hired primarily to assist the basketball program.

Despite Hobson's lack of experience, SONS was very successful in the 1932 season, losing just one game. The style of play under Hobson relied heavily on trick plays to make up for the lack of proper coaching instruction. Success continued in 1933, when, against their largest schedule yet, SONS lost only two games and defeated Oregon Normal School for the first time since 1927. However, this did not continue. Hobson progressively devoted more of his time and the athletic budget to the basketball program and began to actively recruit players away from football. He left after a poor 1934 season to coach the University of Oregon basketball program, which he would later lead to a national championship. The school hired Jean Eberhart, a former basketball player, to fill Hobson's positions. Eberhart also focused on the basketball program; after consecutive winless seasons in 1937 and 1938, school officials suspended the football program indefinitely. In 1940, they shut it down entirely due to World War II.

=== Return of football and Oregon Collegiate Conference: 1946–1970 ===
The Raiders first tasted sustained success under head coach Al Akins. During Akins' 15 years as the Raiders' head coach, Southern Oregon was conference champions seven times (either outright or co-champions). 18 years after Akins' last season, the Raiders experienced their first postseason, defeating Central Washington in the first round of the NAIA playoffs and losing to Mesa State in the quarterfinals. The Raiders found even greater success during the 2001 and 2002 seasons, reaching the quarterfinals of the NAIA playoffs each year. Although, in both years, Southern Oregon lost to Carroll College, neither game was decided by more than four points.

=== Changing conferences: 1971–1998 ===
Southern Oregon was seeking to move up to NCAA Division II as the Great Northwest Athletic Conference had only nine teams after Seattle University moved up to Division I. The university is currently a member of the NAIA and an affiliate member of the Frontier Conference for football while being a member of the Cascade Collegiate Conference for all other sports. It had been reported that the move to NCAA may take years to complete. However, the move never happened. In November 2010, Steve Helminiak was fired as head coach at Southern Oregon. He was replaced by Craig Howard, a high school football coach from Florida. Howard is best known for being the head coach of Tim Tebow at Nease High School in St Augustine, Florida.

=== Independent and Frontier Conference success: 1999–present ===
In December 2014, the Raiders won the NAIA National Championship in Daytona, Florida. The day before, Austin Dodge was named the 2014 NAIA Player of the Year.

== Conference affiliations ==
- 1927–1928: Independent
- 1929: California Coast Conference
- 1930–1938: Independent
- 1939–1945: No team
- 1946: Independent
- 1947–1952: Far West Conference
- 1953–1955: NAIA independent
- 1956–1965: Oregon Collegiate Conference
- 1966–1970: NAIA independent
- 1971–1984: Evergreen Conference
- 1985–1986: Columbia Football League
- 1987–1994: Columbia Football Association, Mount Hood League
- 1995–1998: Columbia Football Association
- 1999–2011: NAIA independent
- 2012–present: Frontier Conference

== Championships ==
=== Conference championships ===
Southern Oregon has won a combined 13 conference championships. The Raiders won the Far West Conference three times, the Oregon Collegiate Conference six times, NAIA District II once, the Columbia Football Association's Mount Hood League once, and NAIA Independents once; and the Frontier Conference once.

| Year | Conference | Overall record |
|---|---|---|
| 1946 | Far West | 8–0 |
| 1947 | Far West | 7–2 |
| 1948 | Far West | 5–5 |
| 1955^{1} | Oregon Collegiate | 4–5 |
| 1957 | Oregon Collegiate | 6–2–1 |
| 1961 | Oregon Collegiate | 5–4 |
| 1962 | Oregon Collegiate | 8–1 |
| 1964† | Oregon Collegiate | 6–2–1 |
| 1965 | Oregon Collegiate | 5–3–1 |
| 1983 | NAIA District II | 9–2 |
| 1990 | CFA, Mount Hood League | 6–3 |
| 2001 | NAIA independents | 9–2 |
| 2012 | Frontier | 9–3 |
^{1}Denotes co-champions.

== Notable players ==
| Player | Tenure |
|---|---|
| Andy Katoa | 1989–1991 |
| Mark Helfrich | 1992–1995 |
| Griff Yates | 1996–1999 |
| Jenner Yriarte | 1996–2000 |
| Michael Seedborg | 1997–2001 |
| Nick Daniken | 1999–2002 |
| Dusty McGrorty | 2000–2003 |
| Andrae Thurman | 2003 |
| Kellan Quick | 2002–2006 |
| Bryan Lee-Lauduski | 2006–2008 |
| Aldrick Rosas | 2013–2014 |
| Austin Dodge | 2011–2014 |
| Ryan Retzlaff | 2011–2014 |

== National awards ==
- AFCA Assistant Coach of the Year

Roger VanDeZande 2001 NAIA
