= 2017 American Athletic Conference Football Championship Game =

- 3rd AAC Championship Game
- Logo of the Championship Game
Memphis Tigers	UCF Knights
(10–1)	(11–0)
55	62
Head coach: Mike Norvell	Head coach: Scott Frost
AP / Coaches / CFP; 16 / 14 / 20	AP / Coaches / CFP; 12 / 11 / 14
	1	2	3	4	OT	2OT	Total
Memphis	7	24	3	14	7	0	55
UCF	17	7	21	3	7	7	62
- Date: December 2, 2017
- Season: 2017
- Stadium: Spectrum Stadium
- Location: Orlando, FL
- MVP: McKenzie Milton
- Favorite: UCF by 7
- Referee: Adam Savoie
- Attendance: 41,433

United States TV coverage
- Network: ABC/IMG
- Announcers: Steve Levy, Brian Griese, and Todd McShay (ABC); Allen Bestwick and Tony Pike (IMG)

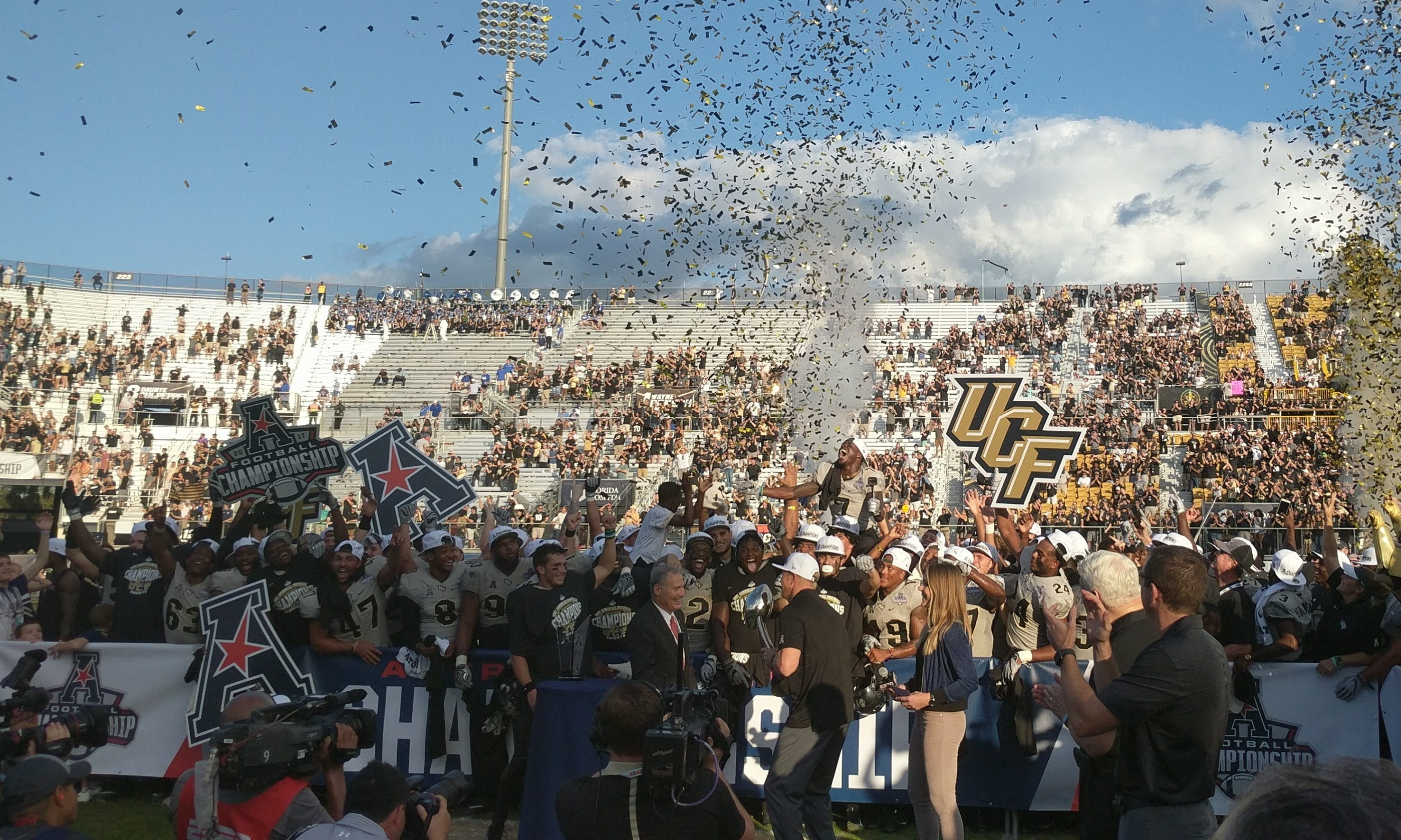
The Knights celebrate their victory over the Tigers

2017 American Athletic Conference football standings
	Conf.			Overall
Team	W		L	W		L
East Division
No. 6 UCF xy$	8	–	0	13	–	0
No. 21 South Florida	6	–	2	10	–	2
Temple	4	–	4	7	–	6
Cincinnati	2	–	6	4	–	8
UConn	2	–	6	3	–	9
East Carolina	2	–	6	3	–	9
West Division
No. 25 Memphis xy	7	–	1	10	–	3
Houston	5	–	3	7	–	5
Navy	4	–	4	7	–	6
SMU	4	–	4	7	–	6
Tulane	3	–	5	5	–	7
Tulsa	1	–	7	2	–	10
Championship: UCF 62, Memphis 55
$ – Conference champion; x – Division champion/co-champions; y – Championship game participant; As of January 9, 2018; Rankings from AP Poll.

The 2017 American Athletic Conference Football Championship Game was held on Saturday, December 2, 2017. This was the third year that the AAC Championship game is played. The game was a rematch of the September 30 matchup, which UCF won 40-13.

== Teams ==
=== Memphis ===
The Memphis Tigers football team is a member of the American Athletic Conference in its West Division. They represented the West Division in the American Athletic Conference Championship Game. The Tigers entered the game 10–1 (7–1 in The American), their only loss coming at the hands of UCF back in September. Memphis was the second-highest scoring team in Division I FBS, second only to UCF. Memphis was seeking its second AAC championship title. The Tigers were co-champions of the AAC in 2014.

=== UCF ===
The UCF Knights football team is a member of the American Athletic Conference in its East Division. They represented the East Division in the American Athletic Conference Championship Game. The Knights were the highest-scoring offense in Division I FBS, and ranked in the top ten in the nation in total yards per game, and passing yards per game. The Knights completed their football program's first undefeated regular season (11–0). The Knights were seeking their third AAC title. UCF were AAC champions in 2013, and co-champions in 2014.

== Game summary ==
=== First quarter ===
Memphis won the coin toss and elected to receive. On the fifth play from scrimmage, Darrell Henderson fumbled at the UCF 45 yard line, and it was recovered by Shaquem Griffin of UCF. McKenzie Milton threw a 24-yard touchdown pass to Dredrick Snelson, and the Knights took a 7–0 lead. After a 3-and-out by Memphis, UCF added a field goal for a 10–0 lead. On the next possession, the Tigers drove 75 yards, all rushing plays, and it was capped off by a 3-yard touchdown run by Patrick Taylor. McKenzie Milton answered with consecutive pass completions to Jordan Akins of 20 yards and 49 yards, respectively, the second of which Akins broke away ran untouched for the touchdown.

=== Second quarter ===
Memphis dominated most of the second quarter, highlighted by miscues by the Knights, particularly on offense. Tigers quarterback Riley Ferguson threw two touchdown passes, including a 68-yard bomb to a wide open Anthony Miller. The Knights committed three turnovers in the second quarter, a fumble by Dredrick Snelson, and two red zone interceptions by McKenzie Milton. In the final two minutes, the Tigers drove to the UCF 9 yard line. Riley Patterson kicked a 27-yard field goal as time expired in the first half. Memphis led at halftime 31–24.

=== Third quarter ===
UCF bounced back in the third quarter. Memphis tried to capitalize on their momentum from the second quarter, and opened the half with a surprise onside kick. However, the onside kick attempt failed. McKenzie Milton had two touchdown runs, and threw for another touchdown. Memphis managed only a field goal in the quarter. The Knights were back in the lead by the score of 45–34.

=== Fourth quarter ===
Memphis was driving into Knights territory as the fourth quarter began. With 13:34 remaining in regular, Riley Patterson missed a 46-yard field goal attempt. The Knights managed to burn nearly four minutes off the clock with a 10-play, 57-yard drive, resulting in a field goal. Trailing by 14, the Tigers answered quickly. Running back Tony Pollard took a hand off 66 yards down the sidelines for a touchdown, and the score was now 48–41. Memphis tied the game 48–48 with just over 4 minutes left in regulation. Ferguson threw a 10-yard touchdown pass to Anthony Miller in the left side of the endzone.

The Tigers defense held the Knights to a three-and-out, and forced a punt. Mac Loudermilk's punt went only 31 yards, and a Fair Catch Interference penalty advanced the Tigers to the 43 yard line. The Tigers drove to the UCF 34 yard line, and with 33 seconds remaining in regulation, lined up for a potential game-winning 46-yard field goal attempt. The field goal attempt was blocked and recovered by the Knights, but not before the Tigers were called for Delay of Game. The penalty gave the Tigers a second chance at a game-winning field goal attempt. Riley Patterson's 51-yard field goal attempt sailed wide left.

The Knights took over at the 34 yard line, but Knights quarterback McKenzie Milton threw an interception, his third of the day. With 14 seconds to go, Memphis quarterback Riley Ferguson was sacked by Titus Davis, and the clock expired.

=== First overtime ===
UCF won the coin toss and elected to go on defense first during the first overtime period. Memphis committed a Delay of Game penalty, and an Offensive Holding penalty, pushing them back to the 40 yard line. On the next play, UCF was called for Pass Interference, and the Tigers got a first down. Riley Ferguson threw a 15-yard touchdown pass to a wide open Anthony Miller and Memphis was ahead 55–48.

UCF went on offense and tied the game. Adrian Killins scored a 2-yard touchdown pass, running to the left, just inside the pylon for the score. The game was tied 55–55.

=== Second overtime ===
In the second overtime period, UCF was on offense first. On 1st down, McKenzie Milton threw a 10-yard completion to Marlon Williams, and Memphis was called for Roughing the Passer, advancing the Knights to the Memphis 10 yard line. Milton ran the ball 9 yards down to the 1 yard line, and on the next play, Otis Anderson punched the ball in to the endzone for the touchdown. UCF led 62–55.

Memphis took over on offense. The Tigers faced a 4th down & 7 at the UCF 22, a stop by the Knights would have ended the game. Riley Ferguson threw a clutch 17-yard pass to Anthony Miller, who made the catch at the UCF 5 yard line.

Facing 2nd down & Goal at the UCF 9 yard line, Riley Ferguson dropped back to pass, but was pressured by Shaquem Griffin. Ferguson's pass was intercepted by Tre Neal at the 4 yard line to end the game.

The two teams combined for 1,479 yard of offense, and 117 points. It was the highest-scoring conference championship game in the history of FBS. UCF quarterback McKenzie Milton threw for 494 yards, and 5 touchdown passes. Memphis quarterback Riley Ferguson threw for 471 yards, and 4 touchdowns, while two Memphis running backs (Henderson and Taylor) each rushed for over 100 yards.

== Scoring summary ==
Scoring summary

Quarter	Time	Drive			Team	Scoring information	Score	
Quarter	Time	Plays	Yards	TOP	Team	Scoring information	Memphis	UCF
1	11:19	5	55	1:48	UCF	Dredrick Snelson 24-yard touchdown reception from Mckenzie Milton, Matthew Wright kick good	0	7
1	6:56	6	80	2:24	UCF	31-yard field goal by Matthew Wright	0	10
1	2:57	9	75	3:59	MEM	Patrick Taylor 3-yard touchdown run, R Patterson kick good	7	10
1	1:32	4	73	1:25	UCF	Jordan Akins 48-yard touchdown reception from Mckenzie Milton, Matthew Wright kick good	7	17
2	14:27	6	89	2:05	MEM	Tony Pollard 13-yard touchdown reception from Riley Ferguson, R Patterson kick good	14	17
2	13:06	4	76	1:21	UCF	Tre'Quan Smith 50-yard touchdown reception from Mckenzie Milton, Matthew Wright kick good	14	24
2	8:52	2	31	0:30	MEM	Darrell Henderson 30-yard touchdown run, R Patterson kick good	21	24
2	4:13	5	97	1:57	MEM	Anthony Miller 68-yard touchdown reception from Riley Ferguson, R Patterson kick good	28	24
2	0:00	8	66	1:50	MEM	27-yard field goal by R Patterson	31	24
3	13:06	6	46	1:54	UCF	Mckenzie Milton 16-yard touchdown run, Matthew Wright kick good	31	31
3	10:21	9	74	2:45	MEM	22-yard field goal by R Patterson	34	31
3	7:15	7	65	3:06	UCF	Tre'Quan Smith 34-yard touchdown reception from Mckenzie Milton, Matthew Wright kick good	34	38
3	2:29	4	85	1:33	UCF	Dredrick Snelson 28-yard touchdown reception from Mckenzie Milton, Matthew Wright kick good	34	45
4	9:51	10	57	3:43	UCF	31-yard field goal by Matthew Wright	34	48
4	9:02	2	70	0:49	MEM	Tony Pollard 66-yard touchdown run, R Patterson kick good	41	48
4	4:13	7	68	2:38	MEM	Anthony Miller 10-yard touchdown reception from Riley Ferguson, R Patterson kick good	48	48
OT		2	25		MEM	Anthony Miller 15-yard touchdown reception from Riley Ferguson, R Patterson kick good	55	48
OT		4	25		UCF	Adrian Killins Jr. 2-yard touchdown run, Matthew Wright kick good	55	55
2OT		3	25		UCF	Otis Anderson 1-yard touchdown run, Matthew Wright kick good	55	62
"TOP" = time of possession. For other American football terms, see Glossary of American football.							55	62

=== Statistics ===
Statistics	Memphis	UCF
First downs	32	32
Plays–yards	89–753	79–726
Rushes–yards	45–282	39–232
Passing yards	471	494
Passing: Comp–Att–Int	30–44–1	28–40–3
Time of possession	33:29	41:31
