= Otis Anderson =

Otis or Ottis Anderson may refer to:

- Ottis Anderson (born 1957), American football running back
- Otis Anderson Jr. (1998–2021), American college football running back
