= Taj McGowan =

American football player (born 1996)

Profile
- Position: Running back

Personal information
- Born: December 30, 1996 (age 29); Hollywood, Florida, U.S.
- Listed height: 6 ft 1 in (1.85 m)
- Listed weight: 210 lb (95 kg)

Career information
- High school: Hallandale (FL)
- College: UCF
- NFL draft: 2019: undrafted

Career history
- Jacksonville Jaguars (2019)

Awards and highlights
- Colley Matrix national champion (2017)
- Stats at Pro Football Reference

Taj McGowan (born December 30, 1996) is an American former professional football running back. He played college football for the UCF Knights, rushing for 470 yards and eight touchdowns his senior season.

== Professional career ==
McGowan appeared in a rookie minicamp for the Jaguars after going undrafted in the 2019 NFL draft, and was signed by the Jaguars on June 5, 2019. He was waived/injured on July 31, 2019, and placed on injured reserve. He was waived with a failed physical designation on April 20, 2020.
