= Wyatt Miller =

American football player (born 1995)

Profile
- Position: Offensive tackle

Personal information
- Born: October 23, 1995 (age 31); Douglas, Georgia, U.S.
- Listed height: 6 ft 5 in (1.96 m)
- Listed weight: 298 lb (135 kg)

Career information
- High school: Coffee (GA)
- College: UCF
- NFL draft: 2019: undrafted

Career history
- New York Jets (2019)*; Cincinnati Bengals (2019)*; Dallas Cowboys (2019); Seattle Seahawks (2020)*; Kansas City Chiefs (2021)*; San Francisco 49ers (2021)*; Carolina Panthers (2022)*; Cleveland Browns (2022)*
- * Offseason or practice squad member only

Awards and highlights
- Colley Matrix national champion (2017); 2× Second-team All-AAC (2017, 2018)
- Stats at Pro Football Reference

Wyatt Miller (born October 23, 1995) is an American former football offensive tackle. He played college football at the University of Central Florida. He was a member of eight NFL teams but never appeared in a game.

== Early life ==
Miller attended Coffee High School. As a junior, he played tight end and registered only one reception for 17 yards. As a senior, he was moved to offensive tackle and was selected to the All-Region first-team.

He lettered four years in baseball and one year in basketball. As a senior, he was a first baseman and hit for a .330 average, while receiving All-region honors.

== College career ==
Miller accepted a football scholarship from the University of Central Florida. As a redshirt freshman, he appeared in 10 games, starting 8 contests at right tackle. As a sophomore, we was named the starter at right tackle and appeared in 13 games. As a junior, he started 13 games at right tackle. He was part of the team that went undefeated.

As a senior, he was named the starter at left tackle and appeared in 13 games. He finished his college career after playing in 49 games with 47 starts.

== Professional career ==
Pre-draft measurables
Height	Weight	Arm length	Hand span	40-yard dash	10-yard split	20-yard split	20-yard shuttle	Three-cone drill	Vertical jump	Broad jump	Bench press
6 ft 5 1/2 in (1.97 m)	302 lb (137 kg)	34 3/4 in (0.88 m)	9 3/4 in (0.25 m)	5.37 s	1.82 s	3.06 s	4.78 s	8.00 s	26.5 in (0.67 m)	8 ft 5 in (2.57 m)	14 reps
All values from Pro Day

=== New York Jets ===
Miller was signed by the New York Jets as an undrafted free agent after the 2019 NFL draft on May 10. He was waived on August 31.

=== Cincinnati Bengals ===
On September 2, 2019, he was signed to the Cincinnati Bengals' practice squad.

=== Dallas Cowboys ===
On December 24, 2019, he was signed by the Dallas Cowboys from the Cincinnati Bengals' practice squad, to take the roster spot of the injured Xavier Su'a-Filo. He was declared inactive in the season finale against the Washington Redskins. He was waived/injured by the Cowboys on September 2, 2020, and subsequently reverted to the team's injured reserve list the next day. He was waived a day later with an injury settlement.

=== Seattle Seahawks ===
On December 17, 2020, Miller was signed to the Seattle Seahawks' practice squad. He was released on January 5, 2021.

=== Kansas City Chiefs ===
On June 14, 2021, Miller signed with the Kansas City Chiefs. He was released on August 31, 2021.

=== San Francisco 49ers ===
On December 15, 2021, Miller was signed to the San Francisco 49ers.

=== Carolina Panthers ===
On May 16, 2022, the Carolina Panthers signed Miller. He was waived on August 14, 2022.

=== Cleveland Browns ===
On August 17, 2022, Miller signed with the Cleveland Browns. He was waived on August 22, 2022.
