= 2017 UCF Knights football team =

American college football season

2017 UCF Knights football

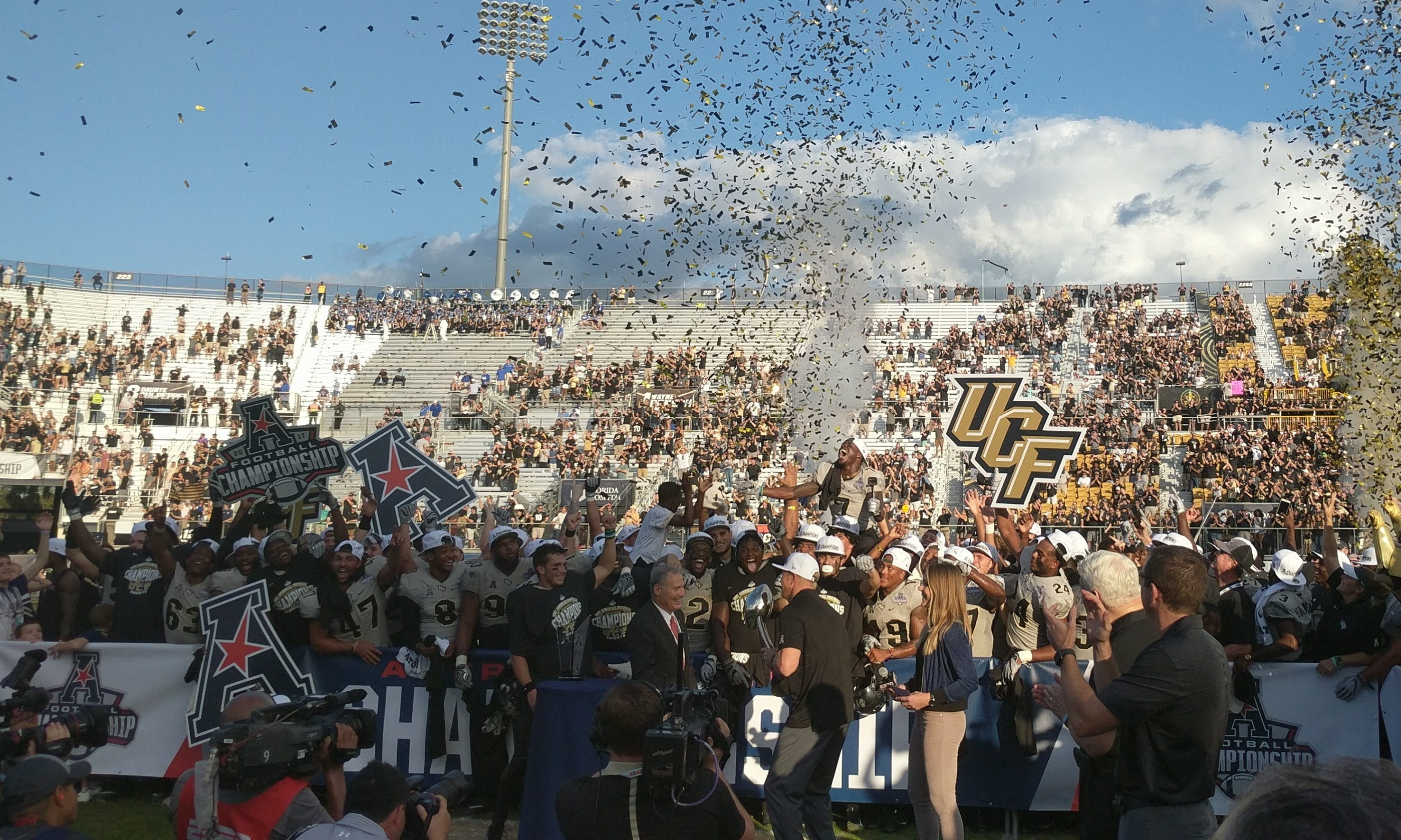
- UCF celebrates their victory over Memphis in the AAC Championship Game.

National champion (Colley) Zuppke Award AAC champion AAC East Division champion Peach Bowl champion

American Athletic Championship Game, W 62–55 ^{2OT} vs. Memphis

Peach Bowl, W 34–27 vs. Auburn
- Conference: American Athletic Conference
- East Division

Ranking
- Coaches: No. 7
- AP: No. 6
- Record: 13–0 (8–0 AAC)
- Head coach: Scott Frost (2nd season)
- Offensive coordinator: Troy Walters (2nd season)
- Offensive scheme: No-huddle spread option
- Defensive coordinator: Erik Chinander (2nd season)
- Base defense: 3–4
- Home stadium: Spectrum Stadium

2017 American Athletic Conference football standings
| | Conf. | | | Overall |
| Team | W | | L | W | | L |
|---|---|---|---|---|---|---|
East Division
| No. 6 UCF xy$ | 8 | – | 0 | 13 | – | 0 |
| No. 21 South Florida | 6 | – | 2 | 10 | – | 2 |
| Temple | 4 | – | 4 | 7 | – | 6 |
| Cincinnati | 2 | – | 6 | 4 | – | 8 |
| UConn | 2 | – | 6 | 3 | – | 9 |
| East Carolina | 2 | – | 6 | 3 | – | 9 |
West Division
| No. 25 Memphis xy | 7 | – | 1 | 10 | – | 3 |
| Houston | 5 | – | 3 | 7 | – | 5 |
| Navy | 4 | – | 4 | 7 | – | 6 |
| SMU | 4 | – | 4 | 7 | – | 6 |
| Tulane | 3 | – | 5 | 5 | – | 7 |
| Tulsa | 1 | – | 7 | 2 | – | 10 |
Championship: UCF 62, Memphis 55
$ – Conference champion; x – Division champion/co-champions; y – Championship game participant; As of January 9, 2018; Rankings from AP Poll.

The 2017 UCF Knights football team represented the University of Central Florida in the 2017 NCAA Division I FBS football season. The Knights played their home games at the newly renamed Spectrum Stadium in Orlando, Florida, and competed in the East Division of the American Athletic Conference. They were led by second year head coach Scott Frost.

The Knights finished the regular season 12–0, the football program's first ever undefeated regular season and second twelve-win season. They clinched the AAC East Division crown after a last-minute win over rival No. 22 South Florida, in a game which received national attention as one of the best of the season. UCF then hosted the American Athletic Conference Championship Game where they defeated Memphis 62–55, in a double overtime shootout. The Knights season culminated in a 2018 Peach Bowl win over No. 7 Auburn. The effort came just two years after an 0–12 winless season (2015). UCF became the first team in the history of NCAA Division I FBS to improve from a winless regular season to an undefeated regular season in only two years.

Despite being the only undefeated team in FBS, UCF did not receive a spot in the College Football Playoff. Frost criticized the College Football Playoff committee, saying that the Knights "deserve[d] more credit from the committee than what they got." Frost believed that the committee deliberately ranked the Knights low enough on a weekly basis that they had no realistic chance of finishing in the top four. The Knights proclaimed themselves national champions at the end of the season. Florida lawmakers proposed passing a resolution declaring UCF the national champions, which Florida Governor Rick Scott proclaimed officially on January 8, 2018, the day of the 2018 College Football Playoff National Championship between Alabama and Georgia. Following that game, on January 9, UCF was ranked No. 1 in the final Colley Matrix, a mathematical ranking designated by the NCAA as a major selector of championships and listed in the NCAA football records book. UCF also received four first place votes in the final AP Poll.

== Preseason ==
=== Spring game ===
The 2017 UCF Spring game was held Saturday April 22 at the Bounce House. The team was split into two squads. Team UCFast consisted mostly of the first team offense and defense, and UCFierce was made up of second team players.

| Date | Time | Spring Game | Site | Result | Attendance |
|---|---|---|---|---|---|
| April 22 | 6:30 pm | Team UCFierce vs. Team UCFast | Bounce House • Orlando, FL | Team UCFierce 35–28 | 9,792 |

=== AAC media poll ===
The AAC preseason media prediction poll was released on July 18, 2017. The Knights were predicted to finish second in the conference's East Division.

Media poll (West)
| Predicted finish | Team | Votes (1st place) |
| 1 | South Florida | 180 (30) |
| 2 | UCF | 126 |
| 3 | Temple | 119 |
| 4 | Cincinnati | 100 |
| 5 | East Carolina | 63 |
| 6 | UConn | 42 |

== Schedule ==
| Date | Time | Opponent | Rank | Site | TV | Result | Attendance |
|---|---|---|---|---|---|---|---|
| August 31 | 6:00 p.m. | FIU* | | Spectrum Stadium; Orlando, FL | CBSSN | W 61–17 | 38,063 |
| ~~September 16~~ | ~~7:30 p.m.~~ | ~~Georgia Tech~~* | | ~~Spectrum Stadium~~; ~~Orlando, FL~~ | ~~ESPNews~~ | Canceled (Note: The Georgia Tech game was canceled due to Hurricane Irma.) | |
| September 23 | 3:00 p.m. | at Maryland* | | Maryland Stadium; College Park, MD | FS1 | W 38–10 | 33,280 |
| September 30 (Note: The Memphis-UCF game, originally scheduled for September 9 at 8:00 pm, was moved on September 5, to September 8 with a 6:30pm kickoff due to Hurricane Irma. The game was then canceled on September 8 out of caution from the threat of the hurricane. The teams announced on September 14 that the game had been moved to September 30, taking the place of the Maine-UCF game.) | 7:00 p.m. | Memphis | | Spectrum Stadium; Orlando, FL | ESPN2 | W 40–13 | 34,022 |
| ~~September 30~~ | ~~6:30 p.m.~~ | ~~Maine~~* | | ~~Spectrum Stadium~~; ~~Orlando, FL~~ | ~~ESPN3~~ | Canceled (Note: The Maine game was canceled to make room for the conference match-up against Memphis, which was postponed due to Hurricane Irma.) | |
| October 7 | 8:00 p.m. | at Cincinnati | No. 25 | Nippert Stadium; Cincinnati, OH (rivalry) | ESPNU | W 51–23 (Note: The Cincinnati game was delayed for lightning with four seconds left in the third quarter. After the delay lasted over an hour, the American Athletic Conference canceled the rest of the game.) | 27,253 |
| October 14 | 7:15 p.m. | East Carolina^{†} | No. 22 | Spectrum Stadium; Orlando, FL (Space Game) | CBSSN | W 63–21 | 40,287 |
| October 21 | 3:30 p.m. | at Navy | No. 20 | Navy–Marine Corps Memorial Stadium; Annapolis, MD | CBSSN | W 31–21 | 35,277 |
| October 28 (Note: The NCAA approved a waiver for Austin Peay to add a game to its schedule and visit UCF on October 28, giving them a sixth home game.) | 5:00 p.m. | Austin Peay (FCS)* | No. 18 | Spectrum Stadium; Orlando, FL | ESPN3 | W 73–33 | 27,606 |
| November 4 | 7:15 p.m. | at SMU | No. 18 | Gerald J. Ford Stadium; University Park, TX | ESPN2 | W 31–24 | 24,445 |
| November 11 | 12:00 p.m. | UConn | No. 18 | Spectrum Stadium; Orlando, FL (Civil Conflict) | ESPNU | W 49–24 | 29,384 |
| November 18 | 12:00 p.m. | at Temple | No. 15 | Lincoln Financial Field; Philadelphia, PA | ESPNU | W 45–19 | 25,877 |
| November 24 | 3:30 p.m. | No. 22 South Florida | No. 15 | Spectrum Stadium; Orlando, FL (War on I-4) | ABC | W 49–42 | 47,129 |
| December 2 | 12:00 p.m. | No. 20 Memphis | No. 14 | Spectrum Stadium; Orlando, FL (The American Championship) | ABC | W 62–55 ^{2OT} | 41,433 |
| January 1, 2018 | 12:30 p.m. | vs. No. 7 Auburn* | No. 12 | Mercedes-Benz Stadium; Atlanta, GA (Peach Bowl) | ESPN | W 34–27 | 71,109 |
*Non-conference game; ^{†}Homecoming; Rankings from AP Poll (and CFP Rankings, after October 31) - Released prior to game; All times are in Eastern time

== Rankings ==
Ranking movements Legend: ██ Increase in ranking ██ Decrease in ranking — = Not ranked RV = Received votes ( ) = First-place votes
| | Week | | | | | | | | | | | | | | | |
| Poll | Pre | 1 | 2 | 3 | 4 | 5 | 6 | 7 | 8 | 9 | 10 | 11 | 12 | 13 | 14 | Final |
|---|---|---|---|---|---|---|---|---|---|---|---|---|---|---|---|---|
| AP | — | — | — | — | RV | 25 | 22 | 20 | 18 | 15 | 14 | 14 | 13 | 12 | 10 | 6 (4) |
| Coaches | — | RV | RV | — | RV | 25 | 21 | 20 | 17 | 14 | 12 | 12 | 12 | 11 | 10 | 7 |
| CFP | Not released | | | | | | | | | 18 | 18 | 15 | 15 | 14 | 12 | Not released |

== Season summary ==
In just his second season as head coach, and just two years removed from the winless 2015 campaign, head coach Scott Frost aimed to continue the UCF football teams's turnaround. Frost had brought the team six wins in 2016, making them bowl-eligible. Going into 2017, the team looked to build on their momentum.

UCF announced its 2017 football schedule on February 9, 2017. The 2017 schedule originally consisted of seven home and five away games in the regular season. The Knights were set to host conference foes UConn, East Carolina, Memphis, and South Florida and were to travel to Cincinnati, Navy, SMU, and Temple. The Knights also hosted one of their two non-conference opponents, FIU from Conference USA, and traveled to Maryland from the Big Ten.

The Knights opened their season with a lopsided victory against FIU.

UCF was scheduled to host games against Georgia Tech from the ACC, and Maine from the Colonial Athletic Association, before Hurricane Irma caused the Georgia Tech and Memphis games to be canceled. They ended up canceling the Maine game to make time to reschedule the Memphis game. On September 21, 2017, UCF added a home game against the FCS Austin Peay Governors for October 28 to make up for canceling other games, although their regular season still ended up 1 game shorter than normal.

After a 22-day layoff for the hurricane, the Knights had an impressive win at Maryland, leading to a much-anticipated intra-conference meeting against 3–0 Memphis. The Knights soundly beat the Memphis Tigers, establishing themselves as the new front-runner in the AAC. The Knights entered both the AP and Coaches Polls, and later in October, they were also ranked in the CFP rankings.

Statistically, the Knights were the top scoring team in the nation (48.2 points per game), and finished 5th in yards per game (530). With blowout wins against Cincinnati, East Carolina, and Austin Peay, along with closer, pivotal wins against Navy and SMU, the Knights were 10–0 entering the final game of the regular season. The Knights hosted rival South Florida on Black Friday to decide the AAC East Division crown. In a shootout game described by some observers as one of the best games of the college football season, the Knights won the game 49–42.

The Knights finished the regular season 11–0, the program's first ever undefeated regular season. With the win, UCF would host the AAC Championship game. The school set an NCAA mark by becoming the first team to go from a winless regular season (2015) to an undefeated regular season in only two years. The team set school records for most consecutive games won, most points in a single game, and saw many players and coaches receive individual superlative awards.

In the latter weeks of the regular season, fueled by the team's success on the field, media reports began surfacing about the possibility of head coach Scott Frost departing UCF for another school. Frost, the former national championship winning quarterback at Nebraska, had expressed personal interest in the Cornhuskers head coaching job, and it incidentally became available in November. Frost was also rumored for some of the many higher-profile vacancies, including Florida, Tennessee, and others. Nebraska athletic officials actively targeted Frost in their coaching search, and after Frost shot down rumors of going to Florida, it became clear Frost's future would be either at Nebraska, or continuing at UCF.

Despite the ongoing coaching rumors, UCF went on to win the AAC Championship game in dramatic fashion. The game was a rematch against Memphis, but this time the game was a shootout. The Knights prevailed 62–55 in double overtime. The win cemented UCF as the top Group of Five school in the nation, clinching them an automatic berth in a New Year's Six bowl game. Despite their unblemished 12–0 record up to that point, the Knights were not named to the College Football Playoff top four, and effectively could not play for the CFP National Championship. The Knights were paired against No. 7 Auburn in the Chick-fil-A Peach Bowl on New Year's Day. Auburn had notably defeated No. 1 Alabama in the Iron Bowl, but lost the SEC Championship to Georgia a week later, slipping out of the CFP themselves.

A day after winning the AAC, head coach Scott Frost was formally introduced as the new head coach of Nebraska, as had been widely speculated. UCF immediately named offensive coordinator Troy Walters as the interim head coach. Frost would be taking nearly his entire staff with him to Nebraska, potentially leaving UCF without a coaching staff for the bowl season. The newly introduced NCAA early signing period fueled Nebraska's urgency of hiring Frost, as school officials were anxious for Frost to begin recruiting immediately. Meanwhile, UCF named Josh Heupel their new head coach, but stopped short of committing Heupel to coaching in the bowl. After several days of uncertainty, and mild controversy, an agreement was reached such that Frost and his staff would return to UCF to coach the bowl game. Despite the difficulty of juggling two teams at once, Frost was committed to coaching UCF in the Peach Bowl, and called finishing out the UCF job as the 'right thing to do.'

The Knights defeated the Auburn Tigers in the Peach Bowl 34–27, completing a perfect 13–0 season. In the aftermath, UCF athletic director Danny White created a stir when he publicly proclaimed UCF the national champions, despite the CFP championship game still being one week away. Several other outlets followed suit, including the Orlando Sentinel, WYGM, Prince George Journal, and the Colley Matrix. Other national media outlets debated the issue over the next several days. UCF received four first place votes in the final AP Poll, and placed 6th overall. The Knights were honored with a parade at Walt Disney World, a block party in downtown Orlando at Church Street Station, and were presented with the Key to the City by Orlando Mayor Buddy Dyer. Florida Governor Rick Scott signed a resolution officially recognizing the Knights as national champions on January 8, and later in the month, the Knights were honored at the 2018 NFL Pro Bowl.

Off the field, UCF's home stadium changed its name to Spectrum Stadium, reflecting the acquisition of Bright House Networks by Charter Communications, and subsequent re-branding as Spectrum.

== Game summaries ==
=== FIU ===
FIU Panthers at UCF Knights – Game summary

| Quarter | 1 | 2 | 3 | 4 | Total |
|---|---|---|---|---|---|
| Panthers | 7 | 3 | 7 | 0 | 17 |
| Knights | 14 | 26 | 14 | 7 | 61 |

at Spectrum Stadium, Orlando, Florida

- Date: August 31
- Game time: 6:00 p.m. EDT
- Game weather: Mostly sunny, 92 °F (33 °C)
- Game attendance: 38,063
- Referee: Dan Gautereaux
- TV announcers (CBSSN): Sean Grande, Aaron Murray, and Tina Cervasio
- Box score, Recap

Game information
First quarter
- UCF – Jordan Akins 22-yard pass from McKenzie Milton (Mac Loudermilk pass to Jordan Franks), 12:43. Knights 8–0. Drive: 6 plays, 75 yards, 2:17.
- FIU – Thomas Owens 75-yard pass from Alex McGough (Jose Borregales kick), 9:30. Knights 8–7. Drive: 3 plays, 87 yards, 1:07.
- UCF – Tre'Quan Smith 50-yard pass from McKenzie Milton (kick failed), 7:28. Knights 14–7. Drive: 5 plays, 87 yards, 2:02.

Second quarter

- FIU – Jose Borregales 39-yard field goal, 12:49. Knights 14–10. Drive: 4 plays, 4 yards, 1:52.
- UCF – Gabriel Davis 10-yard pass from McKenzie Milton (Matthew Wright kick), 11:44. Knights 21–10. Drive: 4 plays, 70 yards, 1:05.
- UCF – Alex Gardner tackle in own end zone, 7:52. Knights 23–10.
- UCF – Jawon Hamilton 16-yard run (Matthew Wright kick), 5:13. Knights 30–10. Drive: 5 plays, 26 yards, 2:24.
- UCF – Taj McGowan 1-yard run (Matthew Wright kick), 0:53. Knights 37–10. Drive: 4 plays, 60 yards, 1:56.
- UCF – Matthew Wright 44-yard field goal, 0:00. Knights 40–10. Drive: 2 plays, 28 yards, 0:33.

Third quarter

- UCF – Tre'Quan Smith 3-yard pass from McKenzie Milton (Matthew Wright kick), 11:01. Knights 47–10. Drive: 5 plays, 76 yards, 1:43.
- UCF – Cordarrian Richardson 10-yard run (Matthew Wright kick), 6:16. Knights 54–10. Drive: 7 plays, 64 yards, 2:05.
- FIU – Napoleon Maxwell 51-yard run (Jose Borregales kick), 4:25. Knights 54–17. Drive: 4 plays, 65 yards, 1:51.

Fourth quarter

- UCF – Greg McCrae 6-yard run (Matthew Wright kick), 2:00. Knights 61–17. Drive: 9 plays, 47 yards, 4:38.

| Statistics | FIU | UCF |
|---|---|---|
| First downs | 13 | 31 |
| Total yards | 335 | 587 |
| Rushing yards | 134 | 148 |
| Passing yards | 201 | 439 |
| Turnovers | 4 | 2 |
| Time of possession | 24:31 | 35:29 |

| Team | Category | Player | Statistics |
|---|---|---|---|
| FIU | Passing | Alex McGough | 18/29, 201 yards, TD, INT |
| FIU | Rushing | Napoleon Maxwell | 4 rushes, 61 yards, TD |
| FIU | Receiving | Thomas Owens | 4 receptions, 99 yards, TD |
| UCF | Passing | McKenzie Milton | 16/21, 360 yards, 4 TD, INT |
| UCF | Rushing | Jawon Hamilton | 12 rushes, 56 yards, TD |
| UCF | Receiving | Dredrick Snelson | 4 receptions, 98 yards |

The Knights opened the season on Thursday night against FIU. It was the start of the second season for head coach Scott Frost at UCF, as well as the first game for FIU under head coach Butch Davis. The Knights routed the Panthers, as the offense racked up 587 yards, and quarterback McKenzie Milton threw for 360 yards and four touchdown passes (22 yards, 50 yards, 3 yards, 13 yards, respectively). There were four rushing touchdowns, including a 51-yard run by Napoleon Maxwell in the third quarter. The UCF defense forced three fumbles, an interception, a safety, and four 3-and-outs by the Panthers offense.

=== At Maryland ===
UCF Knights at Maryland Terrapins – Game summary

| Quarter | 1 | 2 | 3 | 4 | Total |
|---|---|---|---|---|---|
| Knights | 0 | 14 | 7 | 17 | 38 |
| Terrapins | 3 | 0 | 7 | 0 | 10 |

at Maryland Stadium, College Park, Maryland

- Date: September 23
- Game time: 3:00 p.m. EDT
- Game weather: Sunny, 84 °F (29 °C)
- Game attendance: 33,280
- Referee: Tom Lapenta
- TV announcers (FS1): Eric Collins, Danny Kanell, and A. J. Hawk
- Box score, Recap

Game information
First quarter
- MD – Henry Darmstadter 34-yard field goal, 3:58. Terrapins 3–0. Drive: 5 plays, 16 yards, 2:17.

Second quarter

- UCF – Taj McGowan 1-yard run (Matthew Wright kick), 13:42. Knights 7–3. Drive: 9 plays, 55 yards, 2:43.
- UCF – Taj McGowan 3-yard run (Matthew Wright kick), 3:49. Knights 14–3. Drive: 7 plays, 80 yards, 2:59.

Third quarter

- UCF – Jordan Akins 6-yard pass from McKenzie Milton (Matthew Wright kick), 10:17. Knights 21–3. Drive: 7 plays, 82 yards, 3:05.
- MD – D. J. Moore 20-yard pass from Max Bortenschlager (Henry Darmstadter kick), 2:04. Knights 21–10. Drive: 8 plays, 82 yards, 3:50.

Fourth quarter

- UCF – Matthew Wright 20-yard field goal, 12:34. Knights 24–10. Drive: 9 plays, 73 yards, 4:25.
- UCF – Adrian Killins 15-yard run (Matthew Wright kick), 7:29. Knights 31–10. Drive: 6 plays, 65 yards, 3:38.
- UCF – Mike Hughes 57-yard interception return (Matthew Wright kick), 5:11. Knights 38–10.

| Statistics | UCF | MD |
|---|---|---|
| First downs | 18 | 18 |
| Total yards | 428 | 197 |
| Rushing yards | 250 | 42 |
| Passing yards | 178 | 155 |
| Turnovers | 0 | 2 |
| Time of possession | 30:43 | 29:17 |

| Team | Category | Player | Statistics |
|---|---|---|---|
| UCF | Passing | McKenzie Milton | 18/30, 178 yards, TD |
| UCF | Rushing | McKenzie Milton | 6 rushes, 94 yards |
| UCF | Receiving | Jordan Akins | 3 receptions, 57 yards, TD |
| Maryland | Passing | Max Bortenschlager | 15/26, 132 yards, TD, 2 INT |
| Maryland | Rushing | Lorenzo Harrison III | 10 rushes, 48 yards |
| Maryland | Receiving | D. J. Moore | 8 receptions, 83 yards, TD |

After a 22-day layoff due to Hurricane Irma, UCF was back on the field in Week 4. With the teams coming into the matchup ranked No. 1 and No. 2 in scoring (61 points for UCF and 57 points for Maryland) and having gone to double overtime in their meeting last year, the game was expected to be close. After a slow start for both teams, Maryland's backup quarterback, Kasim Hill, was injured and taken off the field in the first quarter. While the Terrapins were able to score the opening field goal at the end of that drive, they could not contain the Knights offense much longer, as the offense combined for 428 total yards. Meanwhile, the Knights defense overpowered the Terrapins on offense, keeping the Terrapins to 42 rushing yards, while the Knights picked off third-string quarterback Max Bortenschlager twice, returning one for a touchdown.

=== Memphis ===
Memphis Tigers at UCF Knights – Game summary

| Quarter | 1 | 2 | 3 | 4 | Total |
|---|---|---|---|---|---|
| Tigers | 7 | 0 | 0 | 6 | 13 |
| Knights | 6 | 17 | 7 | 10 | 40 |

at Spectrum Stadium, Orlando, Florida

- Date: September 30
- Game time: 7:00 p.m. EDT
- Game weather: Mostly cloudy, 83 °F (28 °C)
- Game attendance: 34,022
- Referee: Adam Savoie
- TV announcers (ESPN2): Mike Corey, Ahmad Brooks, and Roddy Jones
- Box score, Recap

Game information
First quarter
- UCF – Taj McGowan 1-yard run (pass failed), 8:11. Knights 6–0. Drive: 17 plays, 92 yards, 6:49.
- MEM – Patrick Taylor Jr. 2-yard run (Spencer Smith kick), 5:15. Tigers 7–6. Drive: 8 plays, 71 yards, 2:56.

Second quarter

- UCF – Matthew Wright 28-yard field goal, 8:29. Knights 9–7. Drive: 7 plays, 46 yards, 2:03.
- UCF – Adrian Killins 96-yard run (Matthew Wright kick), 4:23. Knights 16–7. Drive: 1 play, 91 yards, 0:13.
- UCF – Tre'Quan Smith 34-yard pass from McKenzie Milton (Matthew Wright kick), 2:08. Knights 23–7. Drive: 4 plays, 46 yards, 0:47.

Third quarter

- UCF – Adrian Killins 19-yard pass from McKenzie Milton (Matthew Wright kick), 11:19. Knights 30–7. Drive: 8 plays, 70 yards, 2:55.

Fourth quarter

- UCF – Tre-Quan Smith 25-yard pass from McKenzie Milton (Matthew Wright kick), 14:52. Knights 37–7. Drive: 3 plays, 26 yards, 1:27.
- UCF – Matthew Wright 35-yard field goal, 4:01. Knights 40–7. Drive: 14 plays, 72 yards, 7:24.
- MEM – Damonte Coxie 14-yard pass from Riley Ferguson, 0:00. Knights 40–13. Drive: 7 plays, 83 yards, 1:11.

| Statistics | MEM | UCF |
|---|---|---|
| First downs | 25 | 27 |
| Total yards | 396 | 603 |
| Rushing yards | 75 | 350 |
| Passing yards | 321 | 253 |
| Turnovers | 4 | 1 |
| Time of possession | 22:37 | 37:23 |

| Team | Category | Player | Statistics |
|---|---|---|---|
| Memphis | Passing | Riley Ferguson | 27/49, 321 yards, TD, 3 INT |
| Memphis | Rushing | Darrell Henderson | 6 rushes, 48 yards |
| Memphis | Receiving | Tony Pollard | 3 receptions, 75 yards |
| UCF | Passing | McKenzie Milton | 19/31, 253 yards, 3 TD, INT |
| UCF | Rushing | Adrian Killins | 9 rushes, 115 yards, TD |
| UCF | Receiving | Tre'Quan Smith | 3 receptions, 71 yards, 2 TD |

After having their scheduled game on September 10 canceled due to Hurricane Irma, the two schools arranged to reschedule their game for September 30. It was the conference opener for both teams. Both UCF and Memphis came into the match-up undefeated, with Memphis winning three previous games and UCF winning their two previous games. After a slow start to the game, the Knights ended up with 603 total yards and one turnover, versus Memphis' 396 total yards and four turnovers. UCF quarterback McKenzie Milton threw for 253 yards and three touchdown passes, while running back Adrian Killins Jr. scored two rushing touchdowns. Killins set a UCF record with a 96-yard touchdown run, the longest rushing touchdown in school history. After the game, UCF entered both the AP Poll and the Coaches Poll at No. 25.

=== At Cincinnati ===
No. 25 UCF Knights at Cincinnati Bearcats – Game summary

| Quarter | 1 | 2 | 3 | 4 | Total |
|---|---|---|---|---|---|
| No. 25 Knights | 20 | 17 | 14 | - | 51 |
| Bearcats | 7 | 9 | 7 | - | 23 |

at Nippert Stadium, Cincinnati, Ohio

- Date: October 7
- Game time: 8:00 p.m. EDT
- Game weather: Broken clouds, 80 °F (27 °C)
- Game attendance: 27,253
- Referee: A. Calabrese
- TV announcers (ESPNU): Roy Philpott and Tom Ramsey
- Box score, Recap

Game information
First quarter
- UCF – Dredrick Snelson 54-yard pass from McKenzie Milton (Matthew Wright kick), 13:39. Knights 7–0. Drive: 4 plays, 73 yards, 1:21.
- UCF – Tre'Quan Smith 79-yard pass from McKenzie Milton (pass failed), 10:40. Knights 13–0. Drive: 1 play, 79 yards, 0:11.
- CIN – Hayden Moore 2-yard run (Ryan Jones kick), 4:58. Knights 13–7. Drive: 12 plays, 82 yards, 5:37.
- UCF – Taj McGowan 1-yard run (Matthew Wright kick), 1:32. Knights 20–7. Drive: 8 plays, 75 yards, 3:21.

Second quarter

- UCF – Matthew Wright 47-yard field goal, 11:03. Knights 23–7. Drive: 7 plays, 38 yards, 2:57.
- UCF – Michael Colubiale 21-yard pass from McKenzie Milton (Matthew Wright kick), 7:31. Knights 30–7. Drive: 4 plays, 95 yards, 1:22.
- CIN – Hayden Moore 16-yard run (kick blocked), 3:57. Knights 30–13. Drive: 8 plays, 75 yards, 3:34.
- UCF – Tre'Quan Smith 41-yard pass from McKenzie Milton (Matthew Wright kick), 2:57. Knights 37–13. Drive: 3 plays, 69 yards, 0:52.
- CIN – Ryan Jones 26-yard field goal, 0:00. Knights 37–16. Drive: 13 plays, 67 yards, 2:57.

Third quarter

- UCF – Tre'Quan Smith 5-yard run (Matthew Wright kick), 10:06. Knights 44–16. Drive: 10 plays, 70 yards, 3:56.
- CIN – Gerrid Doaks 1-yard pass from Hayden Moore (Ryan Jones kick), 4:19. Knights 44–23. Drive: 11 plays, 75 yards, 5:41.
- UCF – Tre'Quan Smith 22-yard pass from McKenzie Milton (Matthew Wright kick), 2:47. Knights 51–23. Drive: 4 plays, 60 yards, 1:32.

| Statistics | UCF | CIN |
|---|---|---|
| First downs | 23 | 21 |
| Total yards | 515 | 391 |
| Rushing yards | 141 | 113 |
| Passing yards | 374 | 278 |
| Turnovers | 0 | 1 |
| Time of possession | 15:49 | 29:11 |

| Team | Category | Player | Statistics |
|---|---|---|---|
| UCF | Passing | McKenzie Milton | 16/19, 374 yards, 5 TD |
| UCF | Rushing | Adrian Killins | 5 rushes, 47 yards |
| UCF | Receiving | Tre'Quan Smith | 5 receptions, 165 yards, 3 TD |
| Cincinnati | Passing | Hayden Moore | 23/40, 278 yards, TD, INT |
| Cincinnati | Rushing | Hayden Moore | 13 rushes, 75 yards, TD |
| Cincinnati | Receiving | Kahlil Lewis | 7 receptions, 89 yards |

UCF opened the game with two quick touchdowns, with both possessions totaling one minute and 32 seconds of game time, while holding Cincinnati to one touchdown in their first two possession. While the Knights defense let the Bearcats score more points than any of the Knights previous opponents, they also recorded one interception, a blocked PAT and allowed only 391 yards. Meanwhile, the Bearcats defense could not stop the Knights offense, which scored seven touchdowns and set up one field goal over the Knights' eight possessions. The game was stopped with four seconds left in the third quarter due to lightning in the area. Soon after the delay passed the one hour mark, the American Athletic Conference canceled the rest of the game.

=== East Carolina ===
East Carolina Pirates at No. 22 UCF Knights – Game summary

| Quarter | 1 | 2 | 3 | 4 | Total |
|---|---|---|---|---|---|
| Pirates | 7 | 7 | 0 | 7 | 21 |
| No. 22 Knights | 21 | 21 | 7 | 14 | 63 |

at Spectrum Stadium, Orlando, Florida

- Date: October 14
- Game time: 7:15 p.m. EDT
- Game weather: Sunny, 81 °F (27 °C)
- Game attendance: 40,287
- Referee: A. Calabrese
- TV announcers (CBSSN): Rich Waltz, Aaron Murray, and Cassie McKinney
- Box score, Recap

Game information
First quarter
- UCF – Jordan Akins 48-yard pass from McKenzie Milton (Matthew Wright kick), 13:44. Knights 7–0. Drive: 4 plays, 75 yards, 1:16.
- UCF – Jamiyus Pittman 4-yard pass from McKenzie Milton (Matthew Wright kick), 6:17. Knights 14–0. Drive: 12 plays, 80 yards, 5:02.
- ECU – Deondre Farrier 5-yard pass from Thomas Sirk (Jake Verity kick), 4:32. Knights 14–7. Drive: 4 plays, 75 yards, 1:45.
- UCF – Adrian Killins 3-yard run (Matthew Wright kick), 0:12. Knights 21–7. Drive: 6 plays, 69 yards, 1:46.

Second quarter

- UCF – McKenzie Milton 1-yard run (Matthew Wright kick), 7:49. Knights 28–7. Drive: 7 plays, 96 yards, 2:21.
- UCF – Tre Neal 50-yard interception return (Matthew Wright kick), 7:25. Knights 35–7.
- ECU – Davon Grayson 4-yard pass from Thomas Sirk (Jake Verity kick), 1:41. Knights 35–14. Drive: 12 plays, 75 yards, 5:44.
- UCF – Taj McGowan 4-yard run (Matthew Wright kick), 0:40. Knights 42–14. Drive: 6 plays, 75 yards, 1:01.

Third quarter

- UCF – Mike Hughes 68-yard punt return (Matthew Wright kick), 4:48. Knights 49–14.

Fourth quarter

- UCF – Noah Vedral 13-yard run (Matthew Wright kick), 12:58. Knights 56–14. Drive: 8 plays, 66 yards, 2:43.
- ECU – Tahj Deans 17-yard pass from Gardner Minshew (Jake Verity kick), 10:41. Knights 56–21. Drive: 7 plays, 75 yards, 2:17.
- UCF – Greg McCrae 18-yard run (Matthew Wright kick), 5:19. Knights 63–21. Drive: 9 plays, 75 yards, 5:22.

| Statistics | ECU | UCF |
|---|---|---|
| First downs | 16 | 33 |
| Total yards | 347 | 603 |
| Rushing yards | 187 | 238 |
| Passing yards | 160 | 365 |
| Turnovers | 1 | 1 |
| Time of possession | 32:08 | 27:52 |

| Team | Category | Player | Statistics |
|---|---|---|---|
| East Carolina | Passing | Thomas Sirk | 9/21, 91 yards, 2 TD, INT |
| East Carolina | Rushing | Darius Pinnix Jr. | 13 rushes, 93 yards |
| East Carolina | Receiving | Davon Grayson | 6 receptions, 96 yards, TD |
| UCF | Passing | McKenzie Milton | 21/27, 324 yards, 2 TD |
| UCF | Rushing | Greg McCrae | 6 rushes, 67 yards, TD |
| UCF | Receiving | Tre'Quan Smith | 5 receptions, 93 yards |

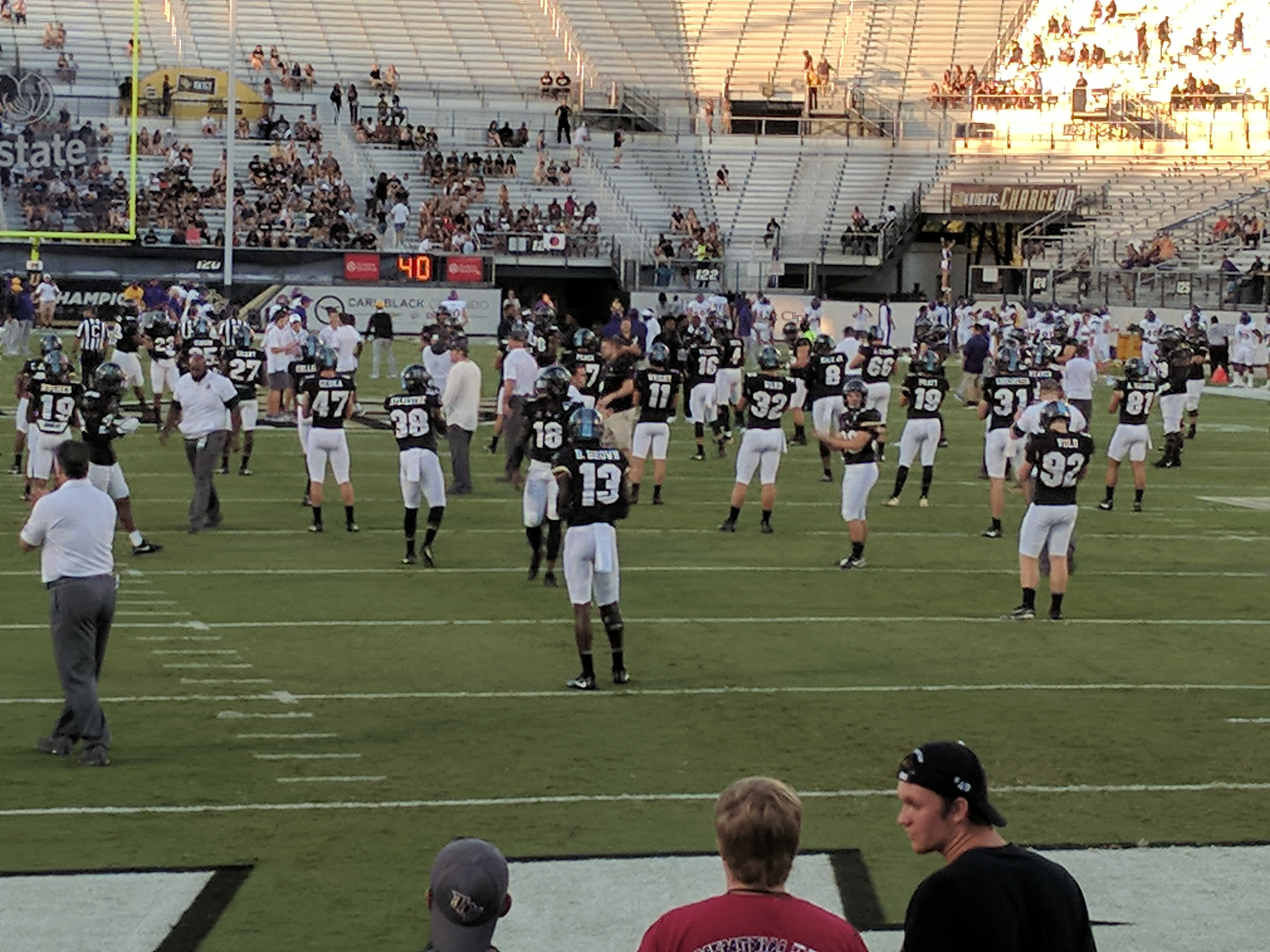
The Knights warming up prior to the ECU game

Entering the game ranked number one in scoring offense in the nation while facing the worst scoring defense in the nation, the Knights were 33.5 point favorites. The Knights ended up scoring nine touchdowns, including one interception returned for a touchdown and one punt return returned for a touchdown. The 63 points the Knights scored were the most since 2001, when they beat Liberty University 63–0. The Knights also put up 603 yards of offense, making it the first time since 1998 that UCF has put up more than 500 yards of offense in three straight games. With the win, the Knights improved to 5–0 for the first time in program history since moving up to Division I football, and the first time since 1988.

=== At Navy ===
No. 20 UCF Knights at Navy Midshipmen – Game summary

| Quarter | 1 | 2 | 3 | 4 | Total |
|---|---|---|---|---|---|
| No. 20 Knights | 7 | 7 | 10 | 7 | 31 |
| Midshipmen | 0 | 7 | 7 | 7 | 21 |

at Navy–Marine Corps Memorial Stadium, Annapolis, Maryland

- Date: October 21
- Game time: 3:30 p.m. EDT
- Game weather: Sunny, 71 °F (22 °C)
- Game attendance: 35,277
- Referee: Adam Savoie
- TV announcers (CBSSN): John Sadak, Randy Cross, and Sheehan Stanwick-Burch
- Box score, Recap

Game information
First quarter
- UCF – Tre'Quan Smith 6-yard pass from McKenzie Milton (Matthew Wright kick), 11:48. Knights 7–0. Drive: 10 plays, 64 yards, 3:12.

Second quarter

- NAVY – Zach Abey 6-yard run (Bennett Moehring kick), 4:46. Tied 7–7. Drive: 12 plays, 92 yards, 6:25.
- UCF – Adrian Killins 15-yard run (Matthew Wright kick), 2:46. Knights 14–7. Drive: 5 plays, 35 yards, 2:00.

Third quarter

- NAVY – Malcolm Perry 75-yard pass from Zach Abey (Bennett Moehring kick), 12:23. Tied 14–14. Drive: 5 plays, 85 yards, 2:37.
- UCF – Adrian Killins 79-yard run (Matthew Wright kick), 12:08. Knights 21–14. Drive: 1 play, 79 yards, 0:15.
- UCF – Matthew Wright 35-yard field goal, 2:41. Knights 24–14. Drive: 12 plays, 45 yards, 4:14.

Fourth quarter

- NAVY – Anthony Gargiulo 7-yard run (Bennett Moehring kick), 12:50. Knights 24–21. Drive: 10 plays, 75 yards, 4:51.
- UCF – Otis Anderson 10-yard run (Matthew Wright kick), 3:30. Knights 31–21. Drive: 7 plays, 54 yards, 3:37.

| Statistics | UCF | NAVY |
|---|---|---|
| First downs | 22 | 19 |
| Total yards | 483 | 419 |
| Rushing yards | 247 | 248 |
| Passing yards | 236 | 171 |
| Turnovers | 1 | 3 |
| Time of possession | 26:01 | 33:59 |

| Team | Category | Player | Statistics |
|---|---|---|---|
| UCF | Passing | McKenzie Milton | 15/23, 233 yards, TD, INT |
| UCF | Rushing | Adrian Killins | 15 rushes, 122 yards, 2 TD |
| UCF | Receiving | Dredrick Nelson | 3 receptions, 72 yards |
| Navy | Passing | Zach Abey | 2/4, 115 yards, TD, INT |
| Navy | Rushing | Zach Abey | 25 rushes, 126 yards, TD |
| Navy | Receiving | Malcolm Perry | 1 reception, 75 yards, TD |

Navy welcomed the Knights to Annapolis following the Midshipmen's first loss of the season, 30–27 at Memphis, while riding a 17-game home win streak. Prior to the game, the Knights practiced against Navy's triple option scheme by having coach Scott Frost, who ran the option offense during his time as quarterback at Nebraska from 1995 to 1997, play as the scout team's quarterback. The game ended up being the Knights closest scoring game yet, with Navy tying the Knights twice and being only three points down for most of the fourth quarter. Both teams offenses racked up over 400 yards. The Midshipmen's defense recorded one fumble, while the Knights defense recorded two interceptions and a fumble. The forced fumble by the Knights was key play of the fourth quarter. With 7:14 left in regulation, facing a 3rd down & 5 at the UCF 38, and trailing by only 3, Navy running back Darryl Bonner took a pitch to the left. A punishing hit by Brandon Moore jarred the ball loose, and Moore recovered for UCF. The Knights then iced the game with a 7-play, clock-burning drive, culminating in Otis Anderson Jr.'s first career touchdown for the Knights, and a ten-point lead they would not surrender. With the 31–21 win, the Knights improved to 6–0 for the first time in program history.

=== Austin Peay ===
Austin Peay Governors at No. 18 UCF Knights – Game summary

| Quarter | 1 | 2 | 3 | 4 | Total |
|---|---|---|---|---|---|
| Governors | 7 | 19 | 7 | 0 | 33 |
| No. 18 Knights | 14 | 31 | 14 | 14 | 73 |

at Spectrum Stadium, Orlando, Florida

- Date: October 28
- Game time: 5:00 p.m. EDT
- Game weather: Mostly cloudy, 77 °F (25 °C)
- Game attendance: 27,606
- Referee: A. Calabrese
- TV announcers (ESPN3): Shawn Kenney and Forrest Conoly
- Box score, Recap

| Statistics | PEAY | UCF |
|---|---|---|
| First downs | 18 | 27 |
| Total yards | 352 | 489 |
| Rushing yards | 143 | 142 |
| Passing yards | 209 | 347 |
| Turnovers | 2 | 0 |
| Time of possession | 32:11 | 27:49 |

| Team | Category | Player | Statistics |
|---|---|---|---|
| Austin Peay | Passing | Jeremiah Oatsvall | 12/18, 209 yards, 2 TD, INT |
| Austin Peay | Rushing | Ahmaad Turner | 9 rushes, 46 yards, TD |
| Austin Peay | Receiving | Kyran Moore | 5 receptions, 130 yards, TD |
| UCF | Passing | McKenzie Milton | 24/26, 275 yards, 3 TD |
| UCF | Rushing | Noah Vedral | 5 rushes, 37 yards, TD |
| UCF | Receiving | Dredrick Snelson | 5 receptions, 90 yards, 2 TD |

Coming off of their closest game yet, the Knights welcomed the Austin Peay Governors (an FCS program) to Spectrum Stadium. Austin Peay came into the game 5–3, after having snapped their 29-game losing streak earlier in the year. Both teams offenses surged throughout the game, with the Governors putting up 352 yards and 33 points, the most by any UCF opponent in the season at the time. Meanwhile, the Knights offense put up 489 yards and a school record 73 points. The Knights defense forced two turnovers, including a fumble returned for a touchdown by Shaquem Griffin. The game also included a kickoff return for a touchdown by each team, a tipped pass for an Austin Peay touchdown, both teams going two for two on fourth down conversions, Austin Peay guard Ryan Rockensuess recovering a fumble for a touchdown after the Governors offense fumbled twice in a play that started from the UCF 5 yard line, and an unsportsmanlike conduct call on UCF head coach Scott Frost, all in the first half. With rival USF's loss to Houston, combined with losses by TCU and Penn State to Iowa State and Ohio State respectively, the Knights became one of only five teams remaining undefeated after Week 9 (along with Alabama, Georgia, Miami (FL), and Wisconsin). They also rose to first place in the American Athletic Conference.

=== At SMU ===
No. 15 UCF Knights at SMU Mustangs – Game summary

| Quarter | 1 | 2 | 3 | 4 | Total |
|---|---|---|---|---|---|
| No. 15 Knights | 7 | 14 | 7 | 3 | 31 |
| Mustangs | 7 | 7 | 10 | 0 | 24 |

at Gerald J. Ford Stadium, University Park, Texas

- Date: November 4
- Game time: 7:15 p.m. EDT/6:15 p.m. CDT
- Game weather: Partly cloudy, 82 °F (28 °C)
- Game attendance: 24,445
- Referee: Adam Savoie
- TV announcers (ESPN2): Anish Shroff, Ahmad Brooks, and Roddy Jones
- Box score, Recap

Game information
First quarter
- SMU – James Proche 86-yard pass from Ben Hicks (Josh Williams kick), 9:03. Mustangs 7–0. Drive: 1 play, 86 yards, 0:16.
- UCF – McKenzie Milton 9-yard run (Matthew Wright kick), 3:16. Tied 7–7. Drive: 6 plays, 95 yards, 1:40.

Second quarter

- UCF – Gabriel Davis 80-yard pass from McKenzie Milton (Matthew Wright kick), 11:58. Knights 14–7. Drive: 3 plays, 80 yards, 0:25.
- SMU – Jordan Wyatt 36-yard interception return (Josh Williams kick), 7:19. Tied 14–14.
- UCF – Adrian Killins 34-yard run (Matthew Wright kick), 2:35. Knights 21–14. Drive: 5 plays, 85 yards, 1:11.

Third quarter

- SMU – Josh Williams 45-yard field goal, 9:08. Knights 21–17. Drive: 16 plays, 51 yards, 5:52.
- UCF – Adrian Killins 64-yard run (Matthew Wright kick), 8:43. Knights 28–17. Drive: 2 plays, 75 yards, 0:25.
- SMU – Xavier Jones 2-yard run (Josh Williams kick), 1:17. Knights 28–24. Drive: 11 plays, 93 yards, 4:00.

Fourth quarter

- UCF – Matthew Wright 19-yard field goal, 14:18. Knights 31–24. Drive: 6 plays, 73 yards, 1:59.

| Statistics | UCF | SMU |
|---|---|---|
| First downs | 23 | 21 |
| Total yards | 615 | 489 |
| Rushing yards | 203 | 206 |
| Passing yards | 412 | 283 |
| Turnovers | 3 | 1 |
| Time of possession | 25:48 | 34:12 |

| Team | Category | Player | Statistics |
|---|---|---|---|
| UCF | Passing | McKenzie Milton | 23/40, 412 yards, TD, 2 INT |
| UCF | Rushing | Adrian Killins | 14 rushes, 145 yards, 2 TD |
| UCF | Receiving | Tre'Quan Smith | 7 receptions, 141 yards |
| SMU | Passing | Ben Hicks | 27/51, 283 yards, TD |
| SMU | Rushing | Xavier Jones | 19 rushes, 84 yards, TD |
| SMU | Receiving | James Proche | 7 receptions, 173 yards, TD |

The Knights visited the SMU Mustangs, who started 6–2, their best record post "death penalty". Both teams boasted high powered offenses, leading some to believe the game would be an offensive shootout. Instead, the game became the second-lowest scoring game of the season for the Knights (behind only the Navy game). The game was the closest game yet for the Knights, and the only one to end as a single digit victory, as well as a one possession game. Though the Knights put up a season-high 615 yards on offense, they were unable to convert all of their drives into points. Inside the red zone, they turned over the ball on downs on their opening drive, and later lost a fumble. Knights quarterback McKenzie Milton also threw two interceptions, including one that was returned for a touchdown. The Knights offense was able to make big plays when it mattered, including an 80-yard touchdown reception by Gabe Davis, a 64-yard touchdown run Adrian Killins Jr., and a 63-yard catch and run by Tre'Quan Smith which set up a field goal. The Knights defense forced a crucial SMU fumble at the goal line, keeping the Mustangs from scoring a touchdown in the second quarter. Late in the fourth quarter, two critical fourth down stops by the defense sealed the game for the Knights. With 5:10 remaining in regulation, facing a 4th down & 3 at the UCF 38, SMU quarterback Ben Hicks threw to Trey Quinn, who dropped the pass as he was turning down field, and the ball was turned over on downs. With 1:24 to go, the Mustangs faced yet another 4th down at their own 34. Hicks pass attempt was incomplete and the Knights took a knee to win the game.

=== UConn ===
UConn Huskies at No. 14 UCF Knights – Game summary

| Quarter | 1 | 2 | 3 | 4 | Total |
|---|---|---|---|---|---|
| Huskies | 3 | 7 | 7 | 7 | 24 |
| No. 14 Knights | 21 | 7 | 0 | 21 | 49 |

at Spectrum Stadium, Orlando, Florida

- Date: November 11
- Game time: 12:00 p.m. EST
- Game weather: Cloudy, 73 °F (23 °C)
- Game attendance: 29,384
- Referee: C. Lamertina
- TV announcers (ESPNU): Mike Couzens and John Congemi
- Box score, Recap

| Statistics | CONN | UCF |
|---|---|---|
| First downs | 23 | 22 |
| Total yards | 413 | 519 |
| Rushing yards | 212 | 173 |
| Passing yards | 201 | 346 |
| Turnovers | 2 | 1 |
| Time of possession | 32:15 | 27:45 |

| Team | Category | Player | Statistics |
|---|---|---|---|
| UConn | Passing | David Pindell | 18/31, 201 yards, 2 TD, INT |
| UConn | Rushing | David Pindell | 21 rushes, 96 yards, TD |
| UConn | Receiving | Arkeel Newsome | 1 reception, 60 yards |
| UCF | Passing | McKenzie Milton | 24/36, 311 yards, 2 TD |
| UCF | Rushing | Otis Anderson Jr. | 9 rushes, 84 yards, 2 TD |
| UCF | Receiving | Tre'Quan Smith | 7 receptions, 120 yards, TD |

UCF hosted UConn, in a matchup once known briefly as the Civil Conflict. With light rain showers in the area, UCF jumped out to a 21–3 lead after the first quarter. The Knights scored an opening drive touchdown run by Otis Anderson, aided by a fourth down conversion resulting from a Huskies offsides penalty as UCF lined up for a punt at their own 29 yard line. Midway through the second quarter, McKenzie Milton threw to Tre'Quan Smith who eluded three defenders untouched for a 41-yard touchdown pass, and UCF enjoyed a 28–10 halftime lead. The Knights, however, sputtered and were held scoreless in the third quarter. Huskies quarterback David Pindell completed a 60-yard pass to Arkeel Newsome, and on the next play, ran the ball in himself for a touchdown, and trimmed the lead to 28–17. Otis Anderson fumbled the ball deep in UConn territory, and later a turnover on downs, and UCF miscues became the focus of attention. The Knights turned the game around in the fourth quarter, however, behind a 65-yard touchdown run by Anderson, and another touchdown run by Milton. With just under 9 minutes remaining, the UCF defense forced a turnover on downs. On the next play from scrimmage, backup quarterback Noah Vedral threw a 35-yard touchdown to Cam Stewart, who was left unguarded, and the Knights sealed a 49–24 victory. With Georgia's loss to Auburn, UCF would be one of four remaining undefeated teams in the country (the others being Alabama, Miami (FL), and Wisconsin).

=== At Temple ===
No. 14 UCF Knights at Temple Owls – Game summary

| Quarter | 1 | 2 | 3 | 4 | Total |
|---|---|---|---|---|---|
| No. 14 Knights | 7 | 24 | 14 | 0 | 45 |
| Owls | 3 | 10 | 0 | 6 | 19 |

at Lincoln Financial Field, Philadelphia, Pennsylvania

- Date: November 18
- Game time: 12:00 p.m. EST
- Game weather: Mostly cloudy, 53 °F (12 °C)
- Game attendance: 25,877
- Referee: Tracy Jones
- TV announcers (ESPNU): Mike Couzens and John Congemi
- Box score, Recap

| Statistics | UCF | TEM |
|---|---|---|
| First downs | 17 | 19 |
| Total yards | 384 | 397 |
| Rushing yards | 130 | 196 |
| Passing yards | 254 | 201 |
| Turnovers | 0 | 5 |
| Time of possession | 28:49 | 31:11 |

| Team | Category | Player | Statistics |
|---|---|---|---|
| UCF | Passing | McKenzie Milton | 16/23, 208 yards, 4 TD |
| UCF | Rushing | Otis Anderson Jr. | 5 rushes, 58 yards |
| UCF | Receiving | Tre'Quan Smith | 4 receptions, 89 yards, TD |
| Temple | Passing | Frank Nutile | 17/40, 201 yards, 2 TD, 4 INT |
| Temple | Rushing | David Hood | 12 rushes, 81 yards |
| Temple | Receiving | Adonis Jennings | 2 receptions, 88 yards, TD |

UCF traveled to Philadelphia to take on division opponent Temple. After a tight first quarter, Temple led 10–7 early in the second period. The Knights then scored 24 unanswered points to go ahead, and never surrendered the lead en route to a 45–19 victory. The Owls offense gave up three turnovers (two interceptions, and one fumble) in the second quarter, all of which led to UCF points. With just over three minutes left before halftime, UCF punter Mac Loudermilk pinned the Owls back at their own 8 yard line. On the next play from scrimmage, Owls quarterback Frank Nutile was intercepted by Kyle Gibson, who returned the ball to the 5 yard line. That set up a McKenzie Milton touchdown pass to Gabe Davis, and capped off an explosive second quarter, and a comfortable 31–10 lead by the Knights at halftime. Both teams traded punts to start the third quarter. Then Milton threw a 22-yard touchdown pass to Tre'Quan Smith to increase the lead. On the next drive, Shaquem Griffin intercepted Frank Nutile, and returned the ball 22 yards close to midfield. Milton drove the Knights down for another touchdown, and a 45–13 lead. The first team offense and first team defense were benched for the duration of the fourth quarter. The second team defense gave up one 74-yard touchdown pass from Frank Nutile to Adonis Jennings, but with three minutes to go Nevelle Clarke intercepted Nutile in the endzone to halt any chance of an Owls rally. The Knights improved to 10–0 on the season.

=== No. 22 South Florida ===
No. 22 South Florida Bulls at No. 13 UCF Knights – Game summary

| Quarter | 1 | 2 | 3 | 4 | Total |
|---|---|---|---|---|---|
| No. 22 Bulls | 7 | 13 | 14 | 8 | 42 |
| No. 13 Knights | 21 | 0 | 7 | 21 | 49 |

at Spectrum Stadium, Orlando, Florida

- Date: November 24
- Game time: 3:30 p.m. EST
- Game weather: Windy, 66 °F (19 °C)
- Game attendance: 47,129
- Referee: Adam Savoie
- TV announcers (ABC): Adam Amin, Dusty Dvoracek, and Molly McGrath
- Box score, Recap

| Statistics | USF | UCF |
|---|---|---|
| First downs | 27 | 32 |
| Total yards | 653 | 533 |
| Rushing yards | 150 | 160 |
| Passing yards | 503 | 373 |
| Turnovers | 2 | 1 |
| Time of possession | 30:41 | 29:19 |

| Team | Category | Player | Statistics |
|---|---|---|---|
| South Florida | Passing | Quinton Flowers | 24/45, 503 yards, 4 TD, INT |
| South Florida | Rushing | Quintin Flowers | 20 rushes, 102 yards, TD |
| South Florida | Receiving | Tyre McCants | 9 receptions, 227 yards, TD |
| UCF | Passing | McKenzie Milton | 29/44, 373 yards, 4 TD, INT |
| UCF | Rushing | Adrian Killins | 15 rushes, 82 yards, TD |
| UCF | Receiving | Dredrick Snelson | 4 receptions, 81 yards, 2 TD |

The 13th-ranked Knights welcomed the 22nd-ranked Bulls (9–1) to Spectrum Stadium with the winner of the game claiming the American Athletic Conference East Division title and a spot in the 2017 American Athletic Conference Football Championship Game. The game was the first ranked match-up in the War on I-4 rivalry. The game quickly turned into an offensive shootout, with a total of 1,186 yards of offense between both teams. The game came down to the wire, with UCF taking an eight-point lead (following an earlier missed extra point by South Florida) with 2:21 left in regulation. South Florida then tied the game with an 83-yard touchdown and a two-point conversion with 1:41 remaining. On the ensuing kickoff, UCF's Mike Hughes returned the kickoff 95 yards for a touchdown, giving the Knights a 49–42 lead, with 1:28 left. The Bulls attempted to strike back, but fumbled on the UCF 45 yard line which UCF linebacker Chequan Burkett recovered to seal the game. The game was called one of the best of the season. With Miami and Alabama both losing their respective games, UCF and Wisconsin would be the only two undefeated teams in Division I FBS.

=== No. 20 Memphis (AAC Championship) ===
2017 American Athletic Conference Championship Game
No. 20 Memphis Tigers at No. 12 UCF Knights – Game summary

| Quarter | 1 | 2 | 3 | 4 | OT | 2OT | Total |
|---|---|---|---|---|---|---|---|
| No. Tigers | 7 | 24 | 3 | 14 | 7 | 0 | 55 |
| No. 12 Knights | 17 | 7 | 21 | 3 | 7 | 7 | 62 |

at Spectrum Stadium, Orlando, Florida

- Date: December 2
- Game time: 12:00 p.m. EST
- Game weather: Partly cloudy, 80 °F (27 °C)
- Game attendance: 41,433
- Referee: Adam Savoie
- TV announcers (ABC): Steve Levy, Brian Griese, and Todd McShay
- Box score, Recap

Game information
First quarter
- UCF – Dredrick Snelson 24-yard pass from McKenzie Milton (Matthew Wright kick), 11:19. Knights 7–0. Drive: 5 plays, 55 yards, 1:48.
- UCF – Matthew Wright 31-yard field goal, 6:56. Knights 10–0. Drive: 6 plays, 80 yards, 2:24.
- MEM – Patrick Taylor Jr. 3-yard run (Riley Patterson kick), 2:57. Knights 10–7. Drive: 9 plays, 75 yards, 3:59.
- UCF – Jordan Akins 48-yard pass from McKenzie Milton (Matthew Wright kick), 1:32. Knights 17–7. Drive: 4 plays, 73 yards, 1:25.

Second quarter

- MEM – Tony Pollard 13-yard pass from Riley Ferguson (Riley Patterson kick), 14:27. Knights 17–14. Drive: 6 plays, 89 yards, 2:05.
- UCF – Tre'Quan Smith 50-yard pass from McKenzie Milton (Matthew Wright kick), 13:06. Knights 24–14. Drive: 4 plays, 76 yards, 1:21.
- MEM – Darrell Henderson 30-yard run (Riley Patterson kick), 8:52. Knights 24–21. Drive: 2 plays, 31 yards, 0:30.
- MEM – Anthony Miller 68-yard pass from Riley Ferguson (Riley Patterson kick), 4:13. Tigers 28–24. Drive: 5 plays, 97 yards, 1:57.
- MEM – Riley Patterson 27-yard field goal, 0:00. Tigers 31–24. Drive: 8 plays, 66 yards, 1:50.

Third quarter

- UCF – McKenzie Milton 16-yard run (Matthew Wright kick), 13:06. Tied 31–31. Drive: 6 plays, 46 yards, 1:54.
- MEM – Riley Patterson 22-yard field goal, 10:21. Tigers 34–31. Drive: 9 plays, 74 yards, 2:45.
- UCF – Tre'Quan Smith 34-yard pass from McKenzie Milton (Matthew Wright kick), 7:15. Knights 38–34. Drive: 7 plays, 65 yards, 3:06.
- UCF – Dredrick Snelson 28-yard pass from McKenzie Milton (Matthew Wright kick), 2:29. Knights 45–34. Drive: 4 plays, 85 yards, 1:33.

Fourth quarter

- UCF – Matthew Wright 31-yard field goal, 9:51. Knights 48–34. Drive: 10 plays, 57 yards, 3:43.
- MEM – Tony Pollard 68-yard run (Riley Patterson kick), 9:02. Knights 48–41. Drive: 2 plays, 70 yards, 0:49.
- MEM – Anthony Miller 10-yard pass from Riley Ferguson (Riley Patterson kick), 4:13. Tied 48–48. Drive: 7 plays, 68 yards, 2:38.

Overtime

- MEM – Anthony Miller 15-yard pass from Riley Ferguson (Riley Patterson kick). Tigers 55–48. Drive: 2 plays, 25 yards.
- UCF – Adrian Killins 2-yard run (Matthew Wright kick). Tied 55–55. Drive: 4 plays, 25 yards.

Second overtime

- UCF – Otis Anderson Jr. 1-yard run (Matthew Wright kick). Knights 62–55. Drive: 3 plays, 25 yards.

| Statistics | MEM | UCF |
|---|---|---|
| First downs | 32 | 32 |
| Total yards | 753 | 726 |
| Rushing yards | 282 | 232 |
| Passing yards | 471 | 494 |
| Turnovers | 2 | 4 |
| Time of possession | 33:29 | 26:31 |

| Team | Category | Player | Statistics |
|---|---|---|---|
| Memphis | Passing | Riley Ferguson | 30/42, 471 yards, 4 TD, INT |
| Memphis | Rushing | Darrell Henderson | 15 rushes, 109 yards, TD |
| Memphis | Receiving | Anthony Miller | 14 receptions, 195 yards, 3 TD |
| UCF | Passing | McKenzie Milton | 28/40, 494 yards, 5 TD, 3 INT |
| UCF | Rushing | Otis Anderson Jr. | 15 rushes, 113 yards, TD |
| UCF | Receiving | Tre'Quan Smith | 6 receptions, 161 yards, 2 TD |

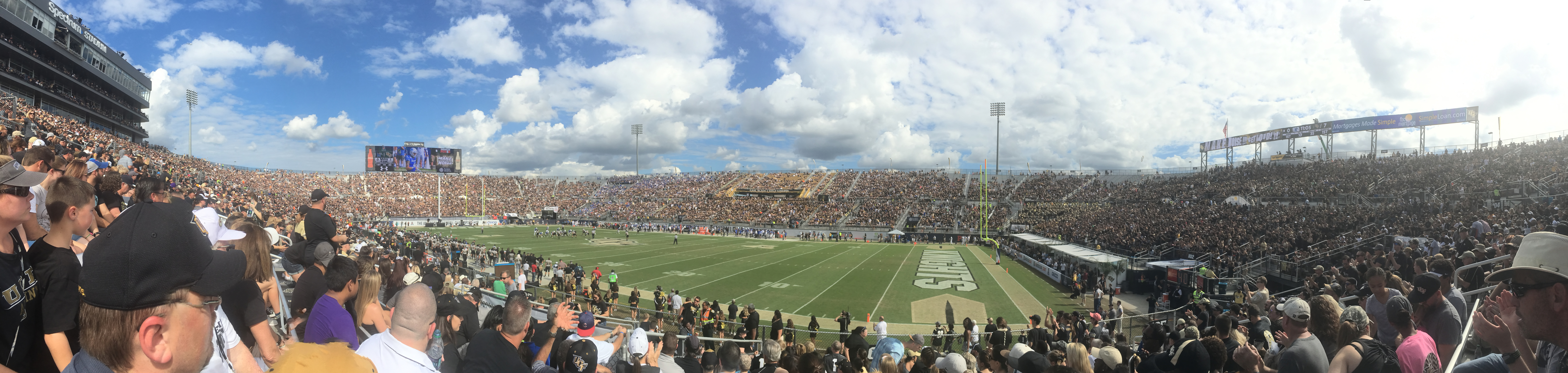
2017 AAC Championship Game

Memphis fumbled away the ball on the first drive of the game. UCF quarterback McKenzie Milton threw two touchdown passes, and the Knights led 17–7 at the end of the first quarter. Memphis dominated most of the second quarter, highlighted by miscues by the Knights, particularly on offense. Tigers quarterback Riley Ferguson threw two touchdown passes, including a 68-yard bomb to a wide open Anthony Miller. The Knights committed three turnovers in the second quarter, a fumble and two red zone interceptions. Tigers kicker Riley Patterson kicked a 27-yard field goal as time expired in the first half, and Memphis led at halftime 31–24.

UCF bounced back in the third quarter. Memphis opened the second half with a surprise onside kick, but the kick attempt failed. McKenzie Milton had two touchdown runs, and threw for another touchdown, and the Knights were back in the lead by the score of 45–34. Trailing by 14 partway through the fourth quarter, Tigers running back Tony Pollard broke away for a 66-yard touchdown run. On their next drive, Memphis tied the game 48–48 with Ferguson's 10-yard touchdown pass to Anthony Miller.

With 33 seconds remaining in regulation, Memphis lined up for a potential game-winning 46-yard field goal attempt. The field goal attempt was blocked and recovered by the Knights, but not before the Tigers were called for Delay of Game. The penalty gave the Tigers a second chance at a game-winning field goal attempt. Riley Patterson's 51-yard field goal attempt sailed wide left, and the game would ultimately go to overtime tied 48–48.

Both teams scored touchdowns in the first overtime period, and the game was tied 55–55 going into the second overtime. Otis Anderson scored a 1-yard touchdown run to put UCF ahead 62–55. Memphis took over on offense. Facing 2nd down & Goal at the UCF 9 yard line, Riley Ferguson dropped back to pass, but was pressured by Shaquem Griffin. Ferguson's pass was intercepted by Tre Neal at the 4 yard line to end the game. With UCF's victory, along with Wisconsin's loss in the Big Ten Championship, UCF would stand as the only undefeated team in the college football season.

=== Vs. No. 7 Auburn (Peach Bowl) ===
2018 Peach Bowl
No. 12 UCF Knights vs. No. 7 Auburn Tigers – Game summary

| Quarter | 1 | 2 | 3 | 4 | Total |
|---|---|---|---|---|---|
| No. 12 Knights | 0 | 13 | 7 | 14 | 34 |
| No. 7 Tigers | 3 | 3 | 14 | 7 | 27 |

at Mercedes-Benz Stadium, Atlanta, Georgia

- Date: January 1, 2018
- Game time: 12:30 p.m. EST
- Game weather: None (retractable roof closed)
- Game attendance: 71,109
- Referee: Brandon Cruse
- TV announcers (ESPN): Dave Flemming, Brock Huard, and Allison Williams
- Box score, Recap

Game information
First quarter
- AUB – Daniel Carlson 25-yard field goal, 7:01. Tigers 3–0. Drive: 9 plays, 43 yards, 3:51.

Second quarter

- UCF – Matthew Wright 33-yard field goal, 11:11. Tied 3–3. Drive: 12 plays, 48 yards, 3:04.
- UCF – McKenzie Milton 18-yard run (Matthew Wright kick), 8:51. Knights 10–3. Drive: 2 plays, 21 yards, 0:47.
- AUB – Daniel Carlson 46-yard field goal, 0:45. Knights 10–6. Drive: 15 plays, 62 yards, 4:16.
- UCF – Matthew Wright 45-yard field goal, 0:00. Knights 13–6. Drive: 6 plays, 42 yards, 0:45.

Third quarter

- AUB – Will Hastings 26-yard pass from Jarrett Stidham (Daniel Carlson kick), 14:05. Tied 13–13. Drive: 2 plays, 26 yards, 0:55.
- AUB – Kerryon Johnson 4-yard run (Daniel Carlson kick), 7:55. Tigers 20–13. Drive: 10 plays, 82 yards, 3:37.
- UCF – Otis Anderson Jr. 12-yard pass from McKenzie Milton (Matthew Wright kick), 1:30. Tied 20–20. Drive: 7 plays, 65 yards, 2:44.

Fourth quarter

- UCF – Dredrick Snelson 8-yard pass from McKenzie Milton (Matthew Wright kick), 11:36. Knights 27–20. Drive: 8 plays, 59 yards, 3:17.
- UCF – Chequan Burkett 45-yard interception return (Matthew Wright kick), 5:56. Knights 34–20.
- AUB – Eli Stove 7-yard run (Daniel Carlson kick), 4:12. Knights 34–27. Drive: 6 plays, 89 yards, 1:44.

| Statistics | UCF | AUB |
|---|---|---|
| First downs | 20 | 28 |
| Total yards | 411 | 421 |
| Rushing yards | 169 | 90 |
| Passing yards | 242 | 331 |
| Turnovers | 1 | 3 |
| Time of possession | 25:45 | 34:15 |

| Team | Category | Player | Statistics |
|---|---|---|---|
| UCF | Passing | McKenzie Milton | 16/35, 242 yards, 2 TD |
| UCF | Rushing | McKenzie Milton | 13 rushes, 116 yards, TD |
| UCF | Receiving | Tre'Quan Smith | 5 receptions, 89 yards |
| Auburn | Passing | Jarrett Stidham | 28/43, 331 yards, TD, 2 INT |
| Auburn | Rushing | Kerryon Johnson | 22 rushes, 71 yards, TD |
| Auburn | Receiving | Will Hastings | 6 receptions, 117 yards, TD |

The No. 12 Knights, as the highest ranked Group of Five conference champion, were given an automatic bid to play in a New Year's Six bowl, traveling up to Atlanta to play in the Peach Bowl at Mercedes-Benz Stadium. The Knights were matched up against the No. 7 Auburn Tigers (10–3), the SEC West champion and 10.5 point favorite. For the Tigers, this would be their second of three consecutive games at Mercedes-Benz Stadium, following their 28–7 loss to Georgia in the 2017 SEC Championship Game, while being scheduled to open their 2018 season against the Washington Huskies in the Chick-fil-A Kickoff Game.

The high-powered UCF offense got off to a shaky start, but superb defensive play kept the Knights in the game during the first half. A mishandled snap was fumbled by quarterback McKenzie Milton and recovered by Auburn, which led to a Tigers field goal and a 3–0 lead. Jarrett Stidham then led Auburn on a 14-play, 45-yard drive to the UCF 36 line. Daniel Carlson missed a 53-yard field goal attempt, and the score remained 3–0. Milton, with two long quarterback runs, put the Knights in field goal range, and the score was tied 3–3 partway through the second quarter. Four play later, Stidham near midfield, ran up the middle for a 6-yard gain. But the ball was punched out of his hands and bounced into the hands of Knights defender Tre Neal. Tightroping down the sidelines, Neal returned the ball 36 yards to the Auburn 21 yard line. Two plays later, McKenzie Milton scored the game's first touchdown, on an 18-yard quarterback run. Milton's passing numbers were thus far unimpressive, finishing the first half only 3-of-17 for 30 yards. But Milton's 83 yards rushing, coupled with five first half sacks by the Knights defense, gave UCF a 13–6 halftime lead.

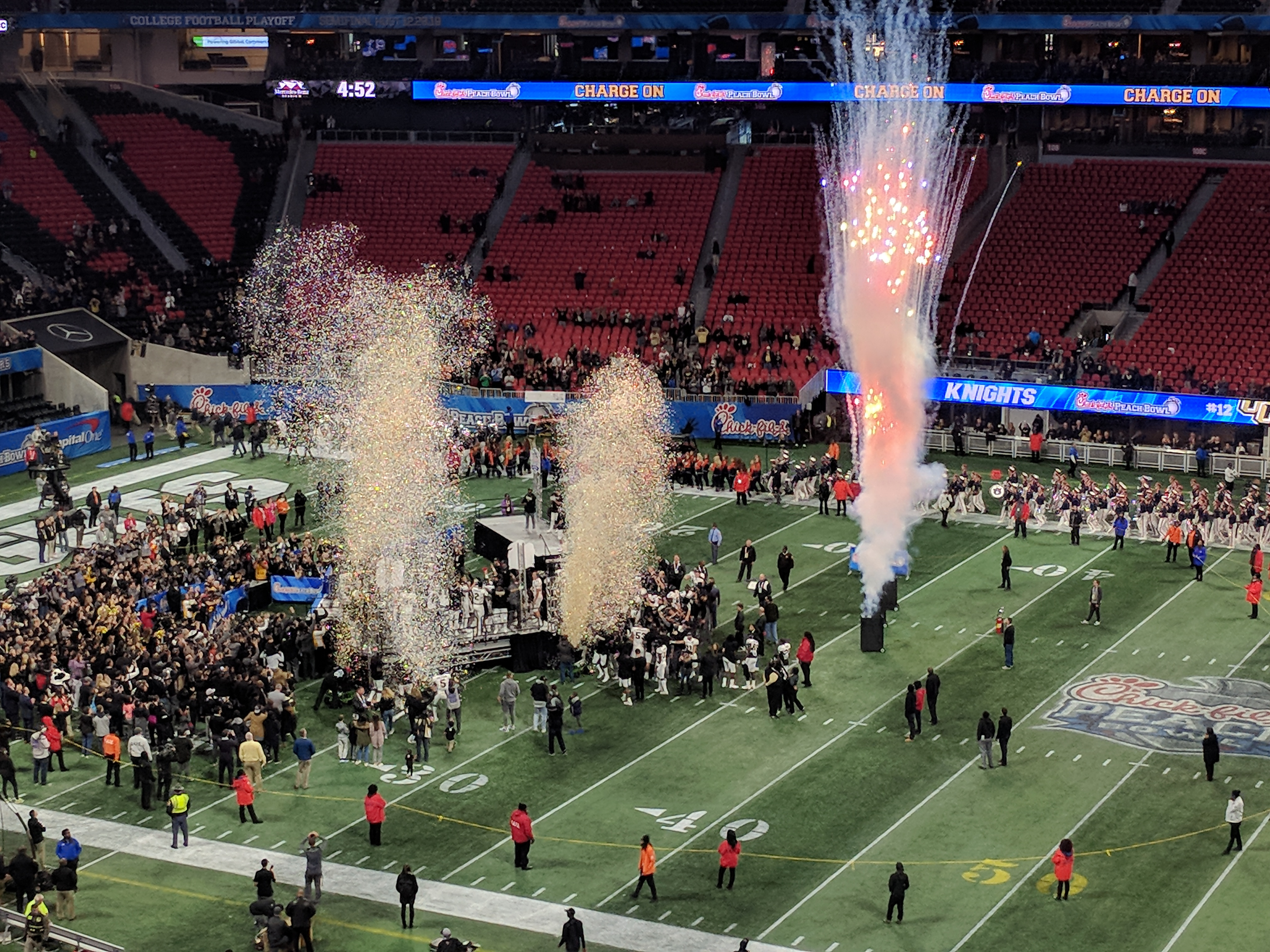
The Knights celebrating their victory over the Auburn Tigers

The third quarter belonged to the Tigers, as Noah Igbinoghene took the second half kickoff back 72 yards to the UCF 26 yard line. Jarrett Stidham threw a 26-yard touchdown pass to Will Hastings, then Kerryon Johnson had a rushing touchdown on the next possession. The Tigers flipped the scoreboard, now leading by the score of 20–13. McKenzie Milton and the Knights offense finally revved into high gear. Facing 3rd down & 8 at their own 37, Milton connected with Jordan Akins for a 26-yard pass completion to the Auburn 37. Milton followed it up with a 12-yard screen pass to running back Otis Anderson. Hit at the 2 yard line, Anderson dragged two defenders into the endzone for the Knights' second touchdown. The UCF defense forced a three-and-out, and at the start of the fourth quarter, Milton and the Knights took over at their own 41. After two long completions, Milton quickly drove the Knights to the 8 yard line. Under pressure and scrambling, Milton found Dredrick Snelson at the back of the endzone for a leaping touchdown catch and a 27–20 UCF lead.

The Tigers went three-and-out for a second time, and Milton slowly began wearing down the Tigers defense. The Knights drove to the Auburn 8 line, but a Matthew Wright field goal attempt was tipped and blocked. At the 40 yard line with just over 6 minutes remaining in regulation, Jarrett Stidham's pass was intercepted by Chequan Burkett, who returned the ball 45 yards for a UCF touchdown. With the Knights now leading 34–20 with under six minutes to go, Auburn fans began heading for the exits, and the UCF side of the stadium turned into a frenzy. Auburn managed a quick touchdown on their next drive, and trimmed the score to 34–27 with 4:12 to play.

Looking to run out the clock, and ice the game, the Knights drove to the Auburn 21, where they faced 4th down & 7 with 2:18 left in regulation. Wright's field goal attempt sailed wide left, and the game shockingly continued. With one last chance to tie the game and potentially force overtime, the Tigers drove to the UCF 21 yard line. They had converted on a 4th & 8, and the Knights defense was bending but did not break. With 33 seconds to go, Stidham was under pressure by Shaquem Griffin, and threw up a desperation pass. With no receivers in the area, the ball was easily intercepted in the endzone by Antwan Collier. The Knights took a knee, and secured the victory, and a 13–0 undefeated season.

McKenzie Milton was selected as the offensive MVP with 245 yards passing, two touchdown passes, no interceptions, 116 yards rushing, and one rushing touchdown. Auburn narrowly edged UCF in total yards (421 to 411), but the Tigers had three turnovers compared to only one for the Knights. Shaquem Griffin had 12 tackles and 1.5 sacks, and pressured Stidham all game. Griffin was voted defensive MVP, in his final game for the Knights. Following the game, the school claimed a national championship. A few days later, UCF was ranked number 1 by the Colley Matrix, an NCAA-designated major selector of football national championships. The NCAA does not officially select a national champion in FBS football.

== Personnel ==
2017 UCF Knights Football
| Quarterback: 8 Darriel Mack Jr. – freshman (6'3, 230); 10 McKenzie Milton – sophomore (5'11, 185); 13 Hayden Kingston – (redshirt) freshman (5'11, 194); 16 Noah Vedral – freshman (6'2, 190); 19 Sean Pratt – (redshirt) sophomore (6'0, 186); Running back: 1 Jawon Hamilton – sophomore (5'9, 199); 9 Adrian Killins – sophomore (5'8, 158); 12 Taj McGowan – junior (6', 210); 24 Bentavious Thompson – freshman (6'1, 190); 29 Cordarrian Richardson – freshman (6'0, 248); 30 Greg McCrae – freshman (5'10, 175); 33 Cedric Jordan-Williams – (redshirt) sophomore (5'9, 231); Wide receiver: 3 Jaquarius Bargnare – sophomore (5'9, 184); 4 Tre'Quan Smith – (redshirt) junior (6'1, 210); 5 Dredrick Snelson – sophomore (6'0, 206); 6 Tristan Payton – junior (6'0, 196); 7 Emmanuel Logan-Greene – freshman (5'10, 171); 11 Cam Stewart – junior (6'3, 203); 13 Gabe Davis – freshman (6'3, 219); 17 Marlon Williams – freshman (6'0, 222); 21 Dontay Mayfield – (redshirt) freshman (6'1, 204); 26 Otis Anderson Jr. – freshman (5'11, 164); 28 Trace Ryan – (redshirt) junior (6'2, 195); 36 Kyle Benkel – (redshirt) freshman (5'9, 184); 38 Zach Lehman – (redshirt) freshman (5'10, 183); 39 Josh Maisel – (redshirt) sophomore (6'1, 202); 80 Case Harrison – (redshirt) sophomore (6'0, 205); 81 Alex Harris – (redshirt) freshman (6'0, 192); 82 Kenyon Johnson – freshman (5'10, 175); 83 Elijah Spann – freshman (5'6, 165); 84 Trey Anderson – (redshirt) senior (5'9, 170); 85 Tristan Reaves – (redshirt) junior (6'3, 216); 87 Jacob Harris – (redshirt) sophomore (6'5, 211); Kicker: 39 Dylan Barnas – (redshirt) sophomore (5'8, 175); Placekicker: 11 Matthew Wright – (redshirt) junior (6'0, 179); 35 Jared Hollander – freshman (5'10, 175); 84 Nader Golshahr – senior (6'0, 182); 92 Jack Vold – freshman (5'10, 190); Punter: 48 Mac Loudermilk – (redshirt) junior (6'1, 264) | Tight end/H-Back: 15 Jordan Franks – senior (6'3, 239); 42 Tyler Williams – freshman (6'1, 220); 45 Chris Larsen – (redshirt) junior (6'1, 229); 83 Jake Hescock – (redshirt) freshman (6'7, 252); 86 Michael Colubiale – (redshirt) senior (6'1, 223); 88 Jordan Akins – senior (6'4, 262); 89 Anthony Roberson – (redshirt) freshman (6'5, 237); 92 Austin Camden – freshman (6'3, 256); Offensive lineman: 52 Brandon Godinez – freshman (6'2, 285); 53 Tyler Hudanick – junior (6'5, 304); 61 Parker Boudreaux – (redshirt) freshman (6'4, 293); 62 Caleb Enot – (redshirt) freshman (5'9, 309); 63 Jared Thomas – freshman (6'2, 275); 64 Kyle Back – freshman (6'4, 320); 65 Cole Schneider – freshman (6'4, 305); 66 Aaron Evans – (redshirt) sophomore (6'6, 325); 68 Charles Sprenkel – (redshirt) sophomore (6'4, 323); 70 Luke Palmer – (redshirt) junior (6'2, 285); 71 Jonathan Horvath – freshman (6'2, 285); 72 Jordan Johnson – sophomore (6'2, 320); 73 Samuel Jackson – freshman (6'6, 356); 74 Boman Swanson – (redshirt) Freshamn (6'5, 306); 75 Tate Hernly – (redshirt) sophomore (6'3, 312); 76 Julio Castillo – freshman (6'6, 367); 77 Jake Brown – (redshirt) sophomore (6'3, 305); 78 Wyatt Miller – (redshirt) junior (6'4, 306); 79 Chavis Dickey – senior (6'4, 340); Defensive lineman: 5 Jamiyus Pittman – senior (6'1, 319); 9 Trysten Hill – sophomore (6'2, 330); 43 Aaron Cochran – junior (6'2, 301); 49 Seyvon Lowry – (redshirt) senior (6'3, 287); 54 A.J. Wooten – (redshirt) junior (6'5, 285); 59 Gary Demarest – (redshirt) junior (6'2, 274); 90 Josh Odigie – senior (6'3, 265); 91 Joey Connors – (redshirt) junior (6'1, 313); 93 Tony Guerad – (redshirt) senior (6'4, 310); 94 Anthony Montalvo – (redshirt) freshman (6'3, 274); 95 Jeremiah Zio – freshman (6'8, 245); 97 Mason Cholewa – freshman (6'7, 270); 98 Brendon Hayes – (redshirt) sophomore (6'3, 293); 99 Canton Kaumatule – junior (6'7, 295) | Inside linebacker: 2 Chequan Burkett – (redshirt) senior (6'2, 230); 17 Sterling Jones – freshman (6'2, 246); 22 Kalia Davis – freshman (6'2, 266); 24 Gabriel Luyanda – junior (6'5, 250); 40 Christian Lezzer – (redshirt) junior (6'0, 231); 41 T.J. Pitts – freshman (6'1, 275); 42 John Tauber – (redshirt) sophomore (6'0, 230); 44 Nate Evans – sophomore (6'1, 242); 50 Wyatt Swanson – (redshirt) freshman (6'1, 225); 51 Darious East – freshman (5'8, 220); 52 Mark Messeguer – (redshirt) junior (5'8, 236); 56 Pat Jasinski – junior (6'1, 233); 57 Tye Farmer – freshman (5'11, 245); 69 Steven Moss – (redshirt) Freshamn (5'11, 216); Outside linebacker: 10 Titus Davis – junior (6'3, 248); 28 Shawn Burgess-Becker – (redshirt) sophomore (6'2, 224); 35 Dedrion Bacote – (redshirt) freshman (6'2, 231); 45 Lyston Barber – freshman (6'0, 180); 55 Eric Mitchell– (redshirt) freshman (6'2, 238); 58 Connor Kaminski – freshman (6'1, 224); 96 Stephon Zayas – freshman (6'6, 225); Linebacker: 18 Shaquem Griffin – (redshirt) senior (6'2, 229); 33 Monterious Loggins – (redshirt) freshman (6'0, 237); 63 Randy Shannon Jr. – (redshirt) freshman (5'9, 210); Defensive back: 3 Antwan Collier – freshman (6'3, 184); 8 Zamari Maxwell – freshman (6'1, 175); 13 Bryon Brown – (redshirt) freshman (6'1, 176); 14 Nevelle Clarke – (redshirt) sophomore (6'1, 185); 19 Mike Hughes – junior (5'11, 191); 20 Brandon Moore – (redshirt) freshman (6'0, 186); 21 Rashard Causey – junior (6'0, 195); 23 Tre Neal – (redshirt) junior (6'1, 215); 25 Kyle Gibson – (redshirt) junior (5'11, 182); 27 Richie Grant – (redshirt) freshman (6'0, 186); 29 Keenan Johnson – junior (6'0, 180); 30 Alex Swenson – freshman (6'2, 190); 34 Jon Powell – freshman (5'11, 210); 36 Josh Kelly – freshman (6'1, 200); 37 Aaron Robinson – sophomore (6'1, 185); 38 Rod Sylvestre – (redshirt) sophomore (6'0, 195); 46 Chris Johnson – (redshirt) senior (5'10, 190); 47 Jonathan Gebka – (redshirt) Freshamn (6'1, 177); Long snappers: 31 Luke Ebbesmeyer – (redshirt) senior (6'7, 241); 32 Alex Ward – freshman (6'4, 220); 47 Caleb Perez – (redshirt) junior (6'1, 232); 67 Dillon Manning – freshman (5'10, 220); 82 Rory Coleman – senior (6'3, 258) |

=== Coaching staff ===
2017 UCF Knights coaching staff
| Head coaches: Head coach – Scott Frost; Assoc. HC/LBs/special teams: Jovan Dewitt; Offensive coaches: Offensive coordinator/WR: Troy Walters; Offensive line: Greg Austin; Running backs: Ryan Held; Quarterbacks: Mario Verduzco; TEs/recruiting coordinator: Sean Beckton; Offensive Analyst: Frank Verducci; Offensive Graduate Assistant: Dustin Haines; Offensive Graduate Assistant: Drew Davis; Defensive coaches: Defensive coordinator: Erik Chinander; Defensive Line: Mike Dawson; Defensive Backs: Travis Fisher; Defensive Graduate Assistant: Jack Cooper | Special teams: Special teams coordinator/Long Snappers/H-back – Mike Buscemi; Supporting Strength and Conditioning coach: S&C Support - Stefan Liskiewicz; Administrative staff: Athletic Director (A.D.) – Danny White; Chief of Staff/Dir. of Ops: Gerrod Lambrecht; Asst. Director of Ops: Trent Mossbrucker; Dir. of player development: Horace Raymond; Dir. of player personnel: Sean Dillon; Ast. Dir. of player personnel: Ryan Callaghan; Dir. of high school relations: Mike Cassano; Quality Control Administrator: Barrett Ruud; Quality Control Administrator: Zach Crespo; Dir. of Sports Performance: Zach Duval; Senior Administrative Assistant: Megan Taylor; Director of Equipment Operations: Rich Worner |

Defense

FS
Tre Neal
Antwan Collier
⋅

| OUTSIDE | INSDIE | INSDIE | OUTSIDE |
|---|---|---|---|
| Shaquem Griffin | Chequan Burkett | Pat Jasinski | Titus Davis |
| Shawn Burgess-Becker | Gabreil Luyanda | Nate Evans | Eric Mitchell |
| ⋅ | ⋅ | ⋅ | ⋅ |

SS
Kyle Gibson
Richie Grant
⋅

CB
Brandon Moore
Rashad Causey
⋅

| DE | NT | DE |
|---|---|---|
| Jamiyus Pittman | Trysten Hill | Tony Guerad |
| Joey Connors | A.J Wooten | Seyvon Lowry |
| ⋅ | ⋅ | ⋅ |

CB
Mike Hughes
Nevelle Clarke
⋅

Offense

WR
Tre'Quan Smith
Cam Stewart
⋅

WR
Gabe Davis
Marlon Williams
⋅

| LT | LG | C | RG | RT |
|---|---|---|---|---|
| Aaron Evans | Tyler Hudanick | Jordan Johnson | Chavis Dickley | Wyatt Miller |
| Charles Sprenkel | Tate Hernly | Luke Palmer | Samuel Jackson | Jake Brown |
| ⋅ | ⋅ | ⋅ | ⋅ | ⋅ |

TE
Jordan Akins
Michael Colubiale
Jordan Franks

WR
Dredrick Snelson
Otis Anderson Jr.
⋅

QB
McKenzie Milton
Noah Vedral
⋅

Special teams
PK Matthew Wright
P Mac Loudermilk
KR Mike Hughes
PR Mike Hughes

RB
Adrian Killins
Otis Anderson Jr.
Taj McGowan
Cordarrian Richardson

== Statistics ==
=== Scores by quarter ===
| | 1 | 2 | 3 | 4 | Total |
|---|---|---|---|---|---|
| UCF | 28 | 84 | 42 | 52 | 206 |
| Non-conference opponents | 20 | 25 | 35 | 7 | 87 |

| | 1 | 2 | 3 | 4 | OT | 2OT | Total |
|---|---|---|---|---|---|---|---|
| UCF | 93 | 127 | 94 | 66 | 7 | 7 | 394 |
| AAC opponents | 48 | 84 | 48 | 55 | 7 | 0 | 242 |

| | 1 | 2 | 3 | 4 | OT | 2OT | Total |
|---|---|---|---|---|---|---|---|
| UCF | 121 | 211 | 136 | 118 | 7 | 7 | 600 |
| All opponents | 68 | 109 | 83 | 62 | 7 | 0 | 329 |

=== Offense ===
Passing statistics
| NAME | RAT | CMP | ATT | YDS | CMP% | TD | INT |
|---|---|---|---|---|---|---|---|
| McKenzie Milton | 179.3 | 265 | 395 | 4037 | 67.1 | 37 | 9 |
| Noah Vedral | 167.2 | 22 | 29 | 276 | 75.9 | 1 | 0 |
| Totals | | 287 | 424 | 4313 | 67.7 | 38 | 9 |

Rushing and receiving statistics
| NAME | Rushing | | | Receiving | | | From Scrimmage | | |
| NAME | CAR | YDS | TD | REC | YDS | TD | Plays | YDS | TD |
|---|---|---|---|---|---|---|---|---|---|
| Adrian Killins | 123 | 790 | 10 | 25 | 169 | 1 | 148 | 959 | 11 |
| McKenzie Milton | 106 | 613 | 8 | | | | 106 | 613 | 8 |
| Totals | | | | | | | | | |

== Awards and milestones ==
=== American Athletic Conference honors ===
- Offensive Player of the Year: McKenzie Milton
- Coach of the Year: Scott Frost

==== American Athletic Conference All-Conference First Team ====
- Aaron Evans, OT
- Jordan Johnson, C
- Jordan Akins, TE
- McKenzie Milton, QB
- Adrian Killins, RB
- Jamiyus Pittman, DL
- Shaquem Griffin, LB
- Mike Hughes, CB
- Kyle Gibson, S

==== American Athletic Conference All-Conference Second Team ====
- Tre'Quan Smith, WR
- Wyatt Miller, OT
- Trysten Hill, DL
- Chequan Burkett, LB
- Matthew Wright, K
- Mac Loudermilk, P
- Mike Hughes, RS

==== American Athletic Conference offensive player of the week ====
- September 4: McKenzie Milton
- October 2: Adrian Killins
- October 16: McKenzie Milton
- November 20: McKenzie Milton
- November 27: McKenzie Milton

==== American Athletic Conference special teams player of the week ====
- October 2: Matthew Wright
- October 16: Mike Hughes
- October 30: Mike Hughes
- November 27: Mike Hughes

=== School records ===
- Best record to start season: 13–0
- Most consecutive victories: 25
- Longest rush from scrimmage: 96 yards (touchdown) – Adrian Killins (September 30, 2017, vs. Memphis)
- Most points scored in single game: 73 vs. Austin Peay (October 28, 2017)
- Most points scored in a season: 627
- Passing yards in a season: 4,037, McKenzie Milton
- Passing touchdowns in a season: 37, McKenzie Milton
- Rushing yards by a quarterback in a season: 613 yards, McKenzie Milton
- Total touchdowns responsible for in a season: 45 (37 passing, 8 rushing), McKenzie Milton
- Total offense in a single game: 562 yards (494 passing, 68 rushing), McKenzie Milton (December 2, 2017, American Championship Game vs. Memphis)

=== National awards and honors ===
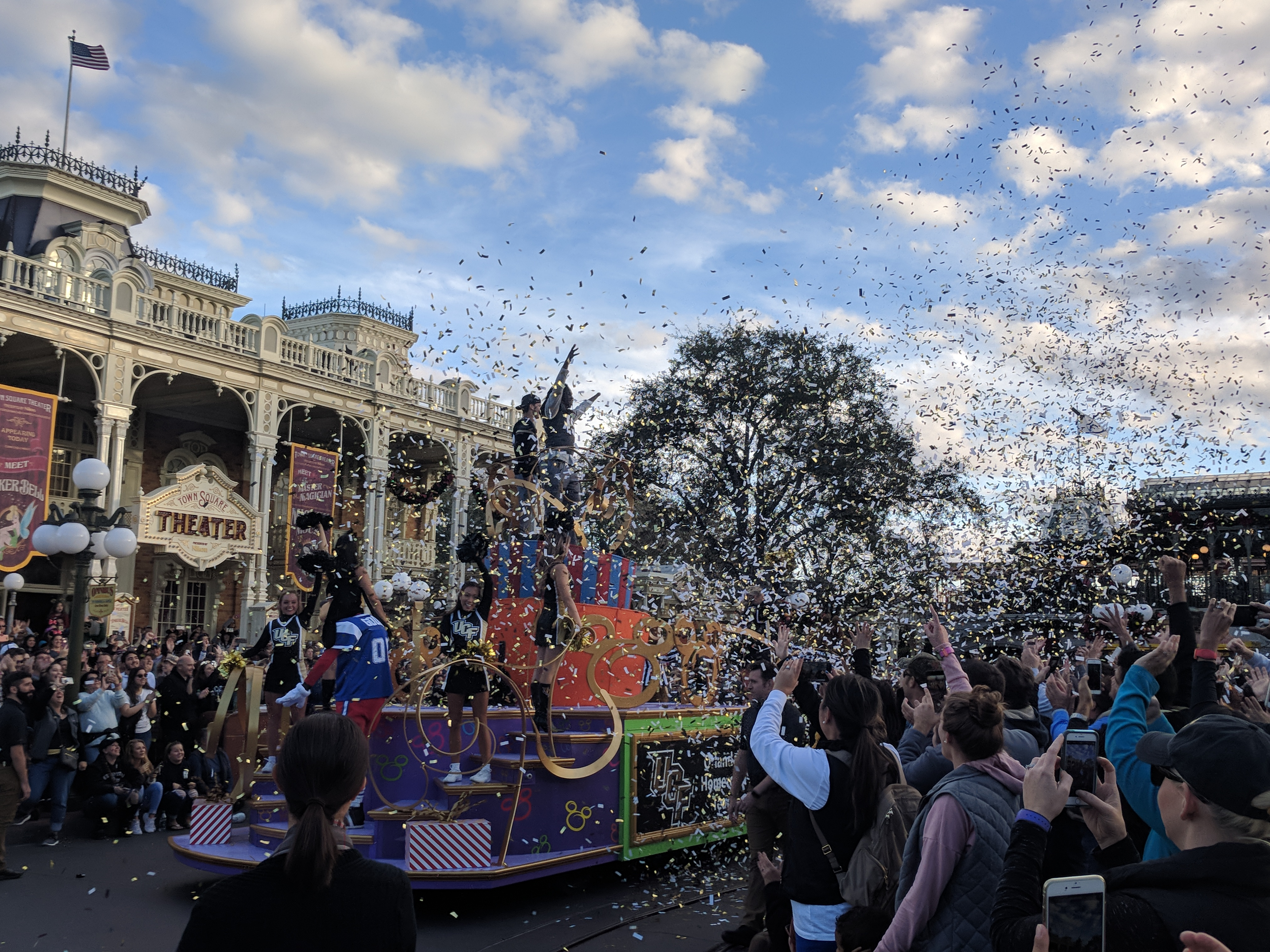
UCF's parade at Walt Disney World

- AFCA Coach of the Year Award – Scott Frost
- Archie Griffin Award – McKenzie Milton
- Associated Press College Football Coach of the Year Award – Scott Frost
- Broyles Award – Troy Walters (semi-finalist)
- College GameDay "Herbie" Awards
  - Moment of the year – Scott Frost winning AAC Championship
  - Game of the year – UCF vs. South Florida
- Davey O'Brien National Quarterback Award (semi-finalist) – McKenzie Milton
- ESPN all-bowl team – Shaquem Griffin
- George Munger Coach of the Year – Scott Frost (semi-finalist)
- Home Depot Coach of the Year – Scott Frost
- Jason Witten Collegiate Man of the Year (finalist) – Shaquem Griffin
- Manning Award Quarterback of the Week (Week 12) – McKenzie Milton
- Ray Guy Award Punter of the Week (Week 11) – Mac Loudermilk
- Senior CLASS Award – Shaquem Griffin
- Touchdown Club of Columbus Male Athlete of the Year – Shaquem Griffin
- Walter Camp Award FBS Offensive Player of the Week (Week 13) – McKenzie Milton
- Walter Camp Player of the Year Award (semi-finalist) – McKenzie Milton
- Woody Hayes Trophy – Scott Frost
- American Football Coaches Association Second Team All-American – Shaquem Griffin
- Football Writers Association of America Second Team All-American – Mike Hughes

== Players in the 2018 NFL draft ==
| Player | Position | Round | Pick | NFL club |
|---|---|---|---|---|
| Mike Hughes | CB | 1 | 30 | Minnesota Vikings |
| Tre'Quan Smith | WR | 3 | 91 | New Orleans Saints |
| Jordan Akins | TE | 3 | 98 | Houston Texans |
| Shaquem Griffin | LB | 5 | 141 | Seattle Seahawks |

Additionally, two players were signed as undrafted free agents:

| Name | Position | Team |
|---|---|---|
| Jordan Franks | TE | Cincinnati Bengals |
| Jamiyus Pittman | DT | Miami Dolphins |
