= Jordan Franks =

American football player (born 1996)

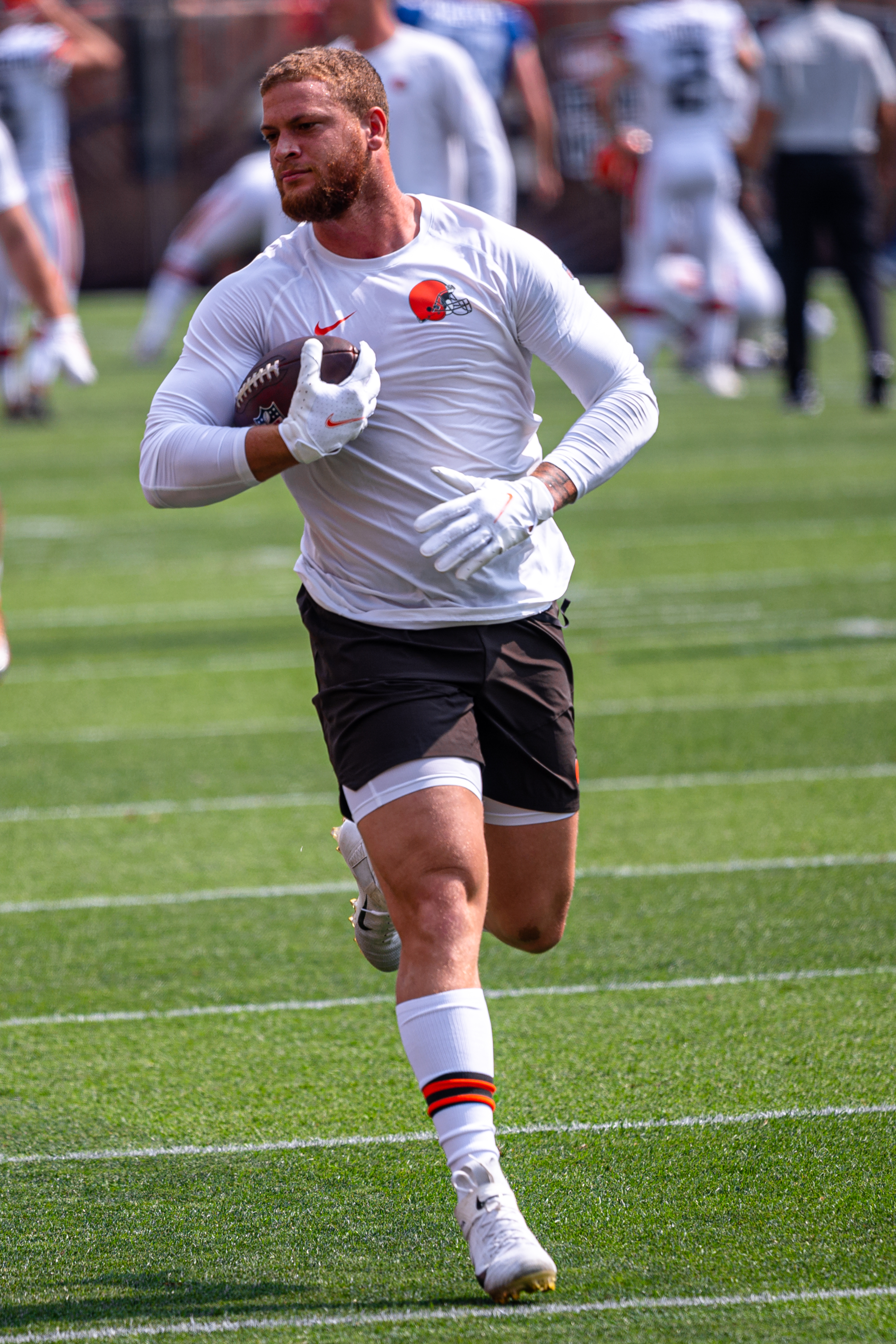
- Franks with the Cleveland Browns in 2021

No. 88, 87, 46
- Position: Tight end

Personal information
- Born: February 1, 1996 (age 30); Tallahassee, Florida, U.S.
- Listed height: 6 ft 4 in (1.93 m)
- Listed weight: 232 lb (105 kg)

Career information
- High school: Wakulla (Crawfordville, Florida)
- College: UCF
- NFL draft: 2018: undrafted

Career history
- Cincinnati Bengals (2018–2019); Philadelphia Eagles (2020)*; Cleveland Browns (2020–2021); Kansas City Chiefs (2022)*
- * Offseason or practice squad member only

Awards and highlights
- Super Bowl champion (LVII); Colley Matrix national champion (2017); First-team All-AAC (2017)

Career NFL statistics
- Receptions: 2
- Receiving yards: 37
- Stats at Pro Football Reference

Jordan Franks (born February 1, 1996) is an American former professional football player who was a tight end in the National Football League (NFL). He played college football for the UCF Knights. He played in the NFL for the Cincinnati Bengals and Cleveland Browns. Franks won Super Bowl LVII as a practice squad member of the Kansas City Chiefs in 2022.

== College career ==
Franks played four seasons for the Knights, appearing in 27 games. While initially recruited as a wide receiver, Franks played several positions at UCF, including linebacker and safety, before moving to tight end.

== Professional career ==
Pre-draft measurables
Height	Weight	Arm length	Hand span	40-yard dash	10-yard split	20-yard split	20-yard shuttle	Three-cone drill	Vertical jump	Broad jump	Bench press
6 ft 3 1/2 in (1.92 m)	232 lb (105 kg)	31 7/8 in (0.81 m)	9 5/8 in (0.24 m)	4.61 s	1.64 s	2.52 s	4.45 s	7.20 s	31.5 in (0.80 m)	9 ft 3 in (2.82 m)	22 reps
All values from Pro Day

=== Cincinnati Bengals ===
Franks signed with the Cincinnati Bengals as an undrafted free agent on April 28, 2018. Franks failed to make the Bengals' 53-man roster out of training camp and was subsequently signed to the team's practice squad. Franks was promoted to the active roster on October 23, 2018, after tight end Mason Schreck was placed on injured reserve with a knee injury. Franks made his NFL debut on October 28, 2018, against the Tampa Bay Buccaneers and recorded his first career reception after catching a 32-yard pass from Andy Dalton. In his rookie season Franks played in six games with two receptions for 37 yards and one tackle on special teams.

Franks was waived during final roster cuts on August 31, 2019, but was signed to the practice squad the following day. He was promoted to the active roster on December 27, 2019.

On September 5, 2020, Franks was waived by the Bengals.

=== Philadelphia Eagles ===
On September 15, 2020, Franks was signed to the Philadelphia Eagles practice squad. He was released on September 29, 2020.

=== Cleveland Browns ===
Franks was signed to the Cleveland Browns' practice squad on October 13, 2020. He was placed on the practice squad/injured list on November 4, 2020.

Franks was signed to a reserve/futures contract by the Browns on January 18, 2021. Franks was waived by the Browns on August 31, 2021. Franks was re-signed to the Browns' practice squad on September 1, 2021. He was elevated to the Browns' active roster on September 25, 2021, prior to the Browns' week 3 matchup against the Chicago Bears, and reverted to the practice squad on September 27, 2021. Franks was released by the Browns on September 28, 2021.

=== Kansas City Chiefs ===
On January 11, 2022, Franks signed a reserve/future contract with the Kansas City Chiefs. He was waived on August 30, 2022, and signed to the practice squad the next day. He was placed on the practice squad/injured list on November 23, 2022. Franks won his first Super Bowl ring when the Chiefs defeated the Philadelphia Eagles in Super Bowl LVII.

On April 17, 2023, Franks announced his retirement from professional football.

== Personal life ==
Franks' younger brother, Feleipe, is a former quarterback for the University of Florida and University of Arkansas Razorbacks. Feleipe is currently a tight end for the Carolina Panthers.
