= Jamiyus Pittman =

American football player (born 1994)

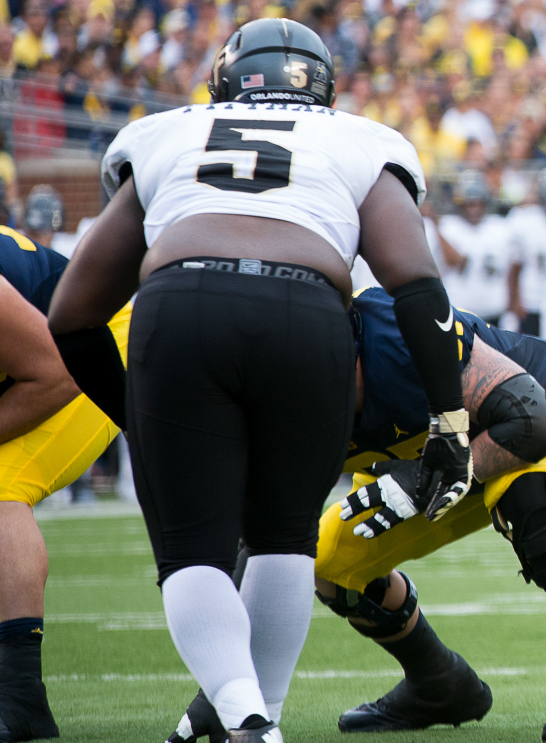
- Pittman with Central Florida in 2016

Profile
- Position: Defensive tackle

Personal information
- Born: October 23, 1994 (age 32); Moultrie, Georgia, U.S.
- Listed height: 6 ft 2 in (1.88 m)
- Listed weight: 319 lb (145 kg)

Career information
- High school: Colquitt County (Norman Park, Georgia)
- College: UCF
- NFL draft: 2018: undrafted

Career history
- Miami Dolphins (2018–2019); Massachusetts Pirates (2023)*; Arizona Rattlers (2024)
- * Offseason or practice squad member only

Awards and highlights
- Colley Matrix national champion (2017); First-team All-AAC (2017); Second-team All-AAC (2016)

Career NFL statistics
- Total tackles: 2
- Sacks: 0.0
- Forced fumbles: 0
- Fumble recoveries: 0
- Stats at Pro Football Reference

Jamiyus Pittman (born October 23, 1994) is an American professional football defensive tackle. He played college football at UCF.

== Early life ==
Pittman was born and raised in Moultrie, Georgia, and attended Colquitt County High School. He recorded 76 tackles, 10 sacks and 12 tackles for loss as a junior for the Packers and was ranked a three-star prospect by most recruiting services. He was named preseason All-State going into his senior season but fractured his fibula in September. Pittman originally committed to play college football at Ole Miss, but de-committed after the team recommended that he "gray shirt" as a freshman. He ultimately accepted a scholarship to play at UCF.

== College career ==
Pittman played four seasons for the Knights, appearing in 49 games and starting 33. Over the course of his collegiate career, Pittman recorded 138 tackles, 13 sacks, four passes defensed and one forced fumble, as well as one blocked kick. As a senior, Pittman recorded 47 tackles and 4.5 sacks was named to the first-team All-AAC team.

== Professional career ==
Pittman signed with the Miami Dolphins as an undrafted free agent on April 28, 2018. He was released by the Dolphins at the end of training camp and subsequently re-signed to the team's practice squad on September 2, 2018. Pittman was promoted to the Dolphins active roster on October 13, 2018. Pittman made his NFL debut on October 14, 2018, against the Chicago Bears, notching one tackle. Pittman was waived by the Dolphins on October 29, 2018, and subsequently re-signed to the team's practice squad two days later. He played in three games with two tackles during his rookie season. He signed a reserve/future contract with the Dolphins on January 1, 2019.

Pittman was waived on August 31, 2019, during final roster cuts but was signed to the Dolphins' practice squad on September 4, 2019. He was placed on the practice squad/injured list on September 23, and was released on September 27.
