= Adrian Killins =

American football player (born 1998)

No. 46
- Position: Running back

Personal information
- Born: January 2, 1998 (age 28); Daytona Beach, Florida, U.S.
- Listed height: 5 ft 8 in (1.73 m)
- Listed weight: 177 lb (80 kg)

Career information
- High school: Mainland (Daytona Beach)
- College: UCF (2016–2019)
- NFL draft: 2020: undrafted

Career history
- Philadelphia Eagles (2020); Denver Broncos (2021); Houston Roughnecks (2023)*; Arlington Renegades (2023)
- * Offseason or practice squad member only

Awards and highlights
- Colley Matrix national champion (2017); First-team All-AAC (2017); 2× Second-team All-AAC (2018, 2019)

Career NFL statistics
- Rushing attempts: 1
- Rushing yards: –12
- Receptions: 1
- Receiving yards: 2
- Total touchdowns: 0
- Stats at Pro Football Reference

Adrian Killins Jr. (born January 2, 1998) is an American former professional football player who was a running back in the National Football League (NFL). He played college football for the UCF Knights. He played for the NFL's Philadelphia Eagles and Arlington Renegades of the XFL.

== Early life ==
Killins was born and grew up in Daytona Beach, Florida and attended Mainland High School, where he played football and ran track. Killins was a two-time state champion in the 200 meters and was the runner-up in the 100 meters as a senior.

== College career ==
Killins was a member of the UCF Knights for four seasons. He was named second-team All-American Athletic Conference (AAC) after his junior season when he rushed 147 times for 715 yards and eight touchdowns and had 19 receptions for 377 yards and four touchdowns. As a senior, Killins rushed for 629 yards and seven touchdowns and caught eight passes for 120 yards and one touchdown and was again named second-team All-AAC. Killins finished his collegiate career with 2,459 rushing yards and 25 rushing touchdowns.

== Professional career ==
=== Philadelphia Eagles ===
Killins was signed by the Philadelphia Eagles as an undrafted free agent following the 2020 NFL draft on April 25, 2020. He was waived on September 3, 2020, during final roster cuts, but re-signed to the team's practice squad three days later. He was promoted to the active roster on October 3, 2020. He was waived on October 5 and subsequently re-signed to the practice squad two days later. He was released from the practice squad on November 9, but re-signed to the practice squad again on November 17. He was released again on November 24, and re-signed to the practice squad again on December 11. He was placed on the practice squad/COVID-19 list by the team on January 2, 2021. His practice squad contract with the team expired after the season on January 11, 2021.

On March 17, 2021, Killins signed with the Eagles on a two-year contract. He was waived on August 14, 2021.

=== Denver Broncos ===
On August 17, 2021, Killins was signed by the Denver Broncos. He was waived/injured on August 24 and placed on injured reserve.

=== Houston Roughnecks ===
On November 17, 2022, Killins was drafted by the Houston Roughnecks of the XFL. He was released on March 15, 2023.
