= Jordan Akins =

American football player (born 1992)

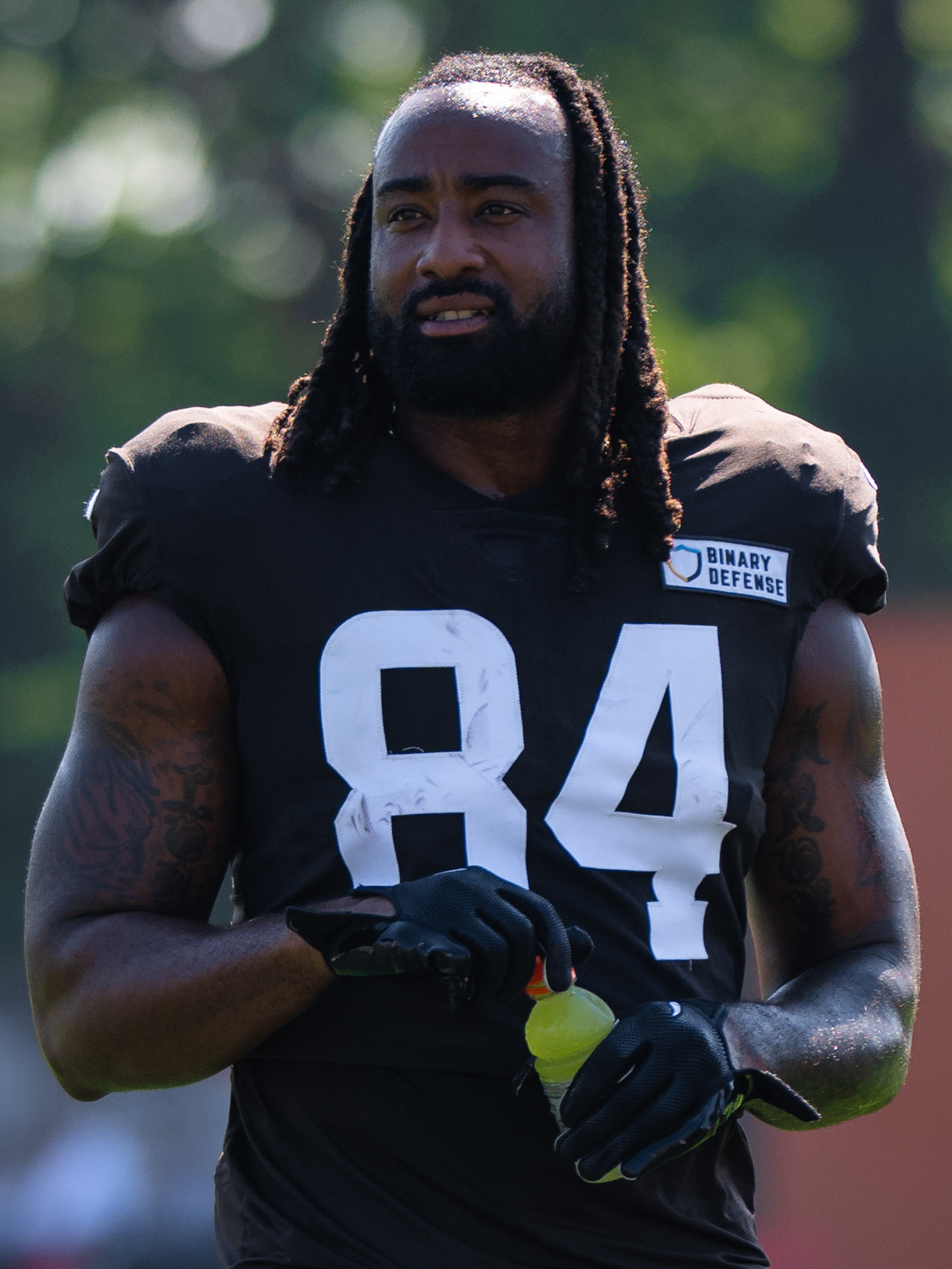
- Akins with the Cleveland Browns in 2023

Profile
- Position: Tight end

Personal information
- Born: April 19, 1992 (age 34); Locust Grove, Georgia, U.S.
- Listed height: 6 ft 3 in (1.91 m)
- Listed weight: 250 lb (113 kg)

Career information
- High school: McDonough (GA) Union Grove
- College: UCF (2014–2017)
- NFL draft: 2018: 3rd round, 98th overall pick

Career history
- Houston Texans (2018–2021); New York Giants (2022)*; Houston Texans (2022); Cleveland Browns (2023–2024); Jacksonville Jaguars (2025)*
- * Offseason or practice squad member only

Awards and highlights
- Colley Matrix national champion (2017); AAC Fifth Anniversary Team (2018); First-team All-AAC (2017)

Career NFL statistics as of 2025
- Receptions: 206
- Receiving yards: 2,277
- Receiving touchdowns: 10
- Stats at Pro Football Reference

Jordan Nikemian Akins (born April 19, 1992) is an American professional football tight end. He played college football for the UCF Knights and was selected by the Houston Texans in the third round of the 2018 NFL draft. Akins has also played for the Cleveland Browns.

== Early life ==
Akins graduated from Union Grove High School in McDonough, Georgia. He earned All-State honors as both a junior and senior, as well as All-Conference as a sophomore. Akins committed and signed to play football for the UCF Knights, choosing the Knights over schools such as LSU and Georgia. However, after being drafted by the Texas Rangers in the third round of the 2010 MLB draft, he chose to pursue a baseball career instead of attending UCF and signed with the Rangers. Akins struggled in the minor leagues, hitting .218 over four seasons and never rising above high-A ball. He retired from baseball after the 2013 season and returned to play football at UCF.

== College career ==
As a true freshman in 2014, Akins played in all 13 of UCF's games, catching 12 passes for 135 yards along with returning 15 kickoffs for 363 yards.

Akins started the 2015 as a starter, but suffered a season-ending injury in UCF's third game against Furman. He elected to take a medical redshirt.

As a redshirt sophomore in 2016, Akins once again played in all 13 of UCF's games, tallying 23 receptions for 347 yards and two touchdowns.

Prior to the 2017 season, Akins was named to the John Mackey Award watch list. He played in 12 of UCF's 13 games, catching 32 passes for 515 yards and four touchdowns. After the season, Akins declared for the 2018 NFL draft.

== Professional career ==
=== Pre-draft ===
On January 3, 2018, Akins announced his decision to forgo his remaining eligibility and enter the 2018 NFL draft. Ten days later, it was announced that Akins had accepted an invitation to play in the 2018 Senior Bowl. On January 27, Akins played in the 2018 Reese's Senior Bowl and caught two passes for 31 yards as part of Houston Texans head coach Bill O'Brien's South team that defeated Denver Broncos head coach Vance Joseph's North team 45–16. Akins sustained a hamstring injury ten days before the NFL Scouting Combine in Indianapolis and was unable to perform any drills and chose to skip the bench press. He attended private workouts and meetings with the Detroit Lions, Kansas City Chiefs, Los Angeles Chargers, and New Orleans Saints. At the conclusion of the pre-draft process, Akins was projected to be a sixth-round pick or priority undrafted free agent by NFL draft experts and scouts. He was ranked as the eighth best tight end prospect in the draft by Scouts Inc. and was ranked the 16th best tight end by DraftScout.com.

Pre-draft measurables
| Height | Weight | Arm length | Hand span | 20-yard shuttle | Three-cone drill | Vertical jump | Broad jump | Bench press |
|---|---|---|---|---|---|---|---|---|
| 6 ft 3 in (1.91 m) | 249 lb (113 kg) | 33 1/2 in (0.85 m) | 9 1/4 in (0.23 m) | 4.38 s | 7.29 s | 35 in (0.89 m) | 10 ft 2 in (3.10 m) | 24 reps |
All values from NFL Combine/UCF's Pro Day

=== Houston Texans (first stint) ===
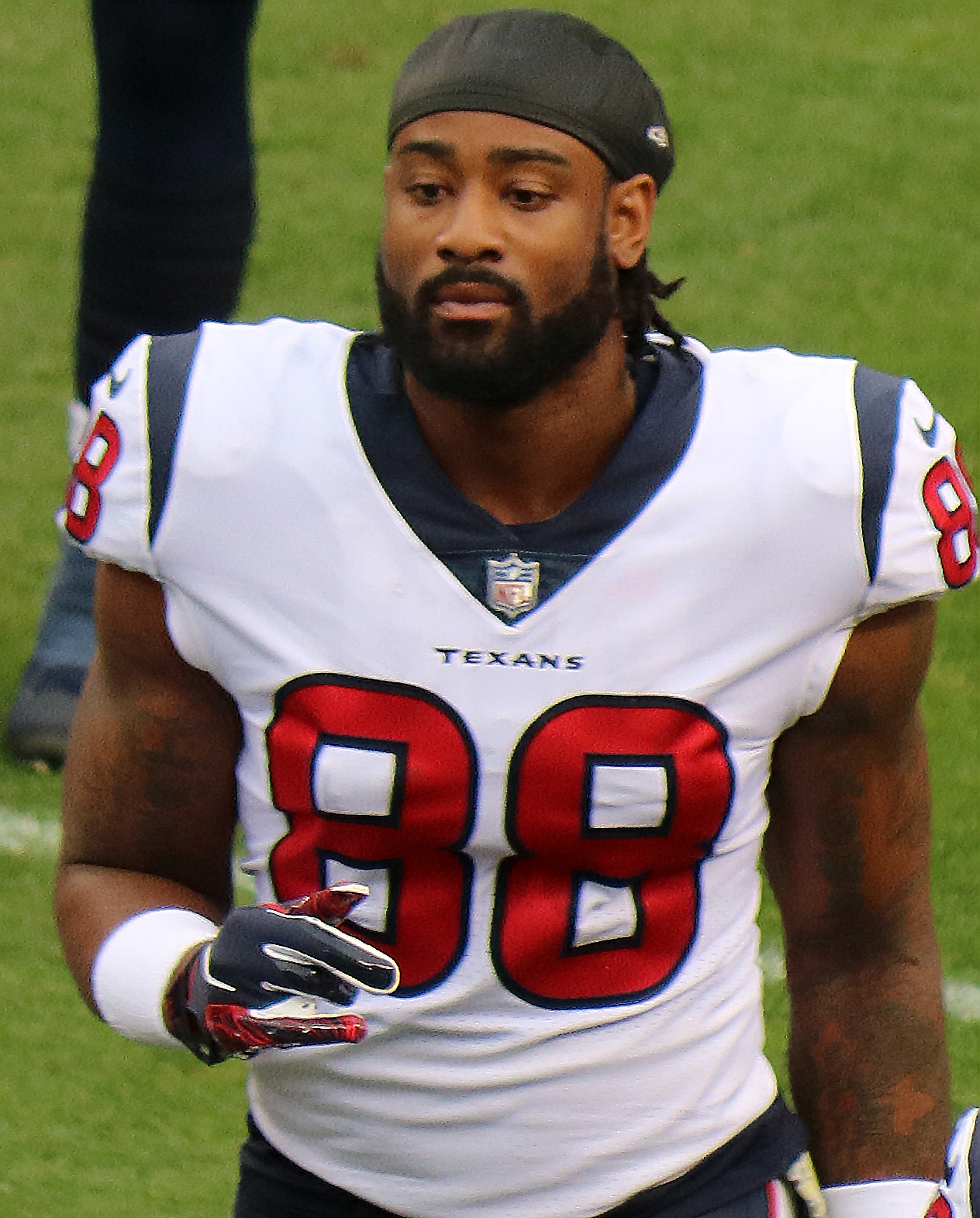
Akins in 2018

The Houston Texans selected Akins in the third round (98th overall) of the 2018 NFL Draft. Akins was the fifth tight end drafted in 2018. He became the highest drafted tight end in UCF's history. On May 10, 2018, the Texans signed Akins to a four-year, $3.32 million contract that includes a signing bonus of $761,520. During the season opener against the New England Patriots, Akins had two receptions for 11 yards in his NFL debut. He played in 16 games with six starts, recording 17 receptions for 225 yards.

In Week 3 of the 2019 season against the Chargers, Akins caught three passes for 73 yards and two touchdowns in the 27–20 road victory. Overall, Akins finished his second professional season with 36 receptions for 418 yards and two touchdowns.

In Week 1 of the 2020 season against the Chiefs, Akins recorded two receptions for 39 yards and a touchdown in the 34–20 loss.

=== New York Giants ===
On April 22, 2022, the New York Giants signed Akins to a one-year contract. On August 24, 2022, Akins was released.

=== Houston Texans (second stint) ===
On August 31, 2022, Akins was signed to the Texans practice squad. He was promoted to the active roster on October 12.

On January 8, 2023, in the final game of the season, Akins played a big role in a consequential ending to the game, which was on the road against the Indianapolis Colts. In the game's final minute, the Texans were trailing 31-24 and had 4th-and-20 on the Colts' 28 yard line. Akins caught a "lucky" touchdown pass from Davis Mills and followed it up with another connection with Mills on a 2-point conversion to take a 32–31 lead, which would end up being the final score. Because of the win, the Texans fell out of the first overall draft pick in the 2023 NFL draft which instead went to the Chicago Bears. The Bears would trade the first pick to the Carolina Panthers, which was used to select Bryce Young, and in return the Bears got a future first-round pick, which ended up being used to select Caleb Williams. The fall in the draft would not end up seeming to haunt the Texans, because with the second pick in the 2023 draft, they chose C. J. Stroud, who has taken the Texans to the playoffs in each of his first three seasons, while Young and the Panthers have had more struggles within that time. However, the win was followed by Texans head coach Lovie Smith (who was previously head coach of the Bears for 9 seasons) being fired not long afterwards.

=== Cleveland Browns ===
On March 18, 2023, Akins signed a two-year contract with the Cleveland Browns. In the 2023 season, he had 15 receptions for 132 yards. In the 2024 season, he had 40 receptions for 390 yards and two touchdowns.

=== Jacksonville Jaguars ===
On October 13, 2025, Akins signed with the Jacksonville Jaguars' practice squad.

== Career statistics ==
=== NFL ===
==== Regular season ====
| Year | Team | Games | | Receiving | | | | | Rushing | | | | | Fumbles | |
| Year | Team | GP | GS | Rec | Yds | Avg | Lng | TD | Att | Yds | Avg | Lng | TD | Fum | Lost |
|---|---|---|---|---|---|---|---|---|---|---|---|---|---|---|---|
| 2018 | HOU | 16 | 6 | 17 | 225 | 13.2 | 28 | 0 | — | — | — | — | — | 0 | 0 |
| 2019 | HOU | 16 | 9 | 36 | 418 | 11.6 | 53 | 2 | — | — | — | — | — | 0 | 0 |
| 2020 | HOU | 13 | 5 | 37 | 403 | 10.9 | 26 | 1 | 1 | 4 | 4.0 | 4 | 0 | 0 | 0 |
| 2021 | HOU | 13 | 3 | 24 | 214 | 8.9 | 31 | 0 | 1 | 3 | 3.0 | 3 | 0 | 2 | 2 |
| 2022 | HOU | 15 | 3 | 37 | 495 | 13.4 | 46 | 5 | — | — | — | — | — | 1 | 1 |
| 2023 | CLE | 17 | 4 | 15 | 132 | 8.8 | 28 | 0 | — | — | — | — | — | — | — |
| 2024 | CLE | 17 | 6 | 40 | 390 | 9.8 | 21 | 2 | — | — | — | — | — | 1 | 1 |
| Career | | 107 | 36 | 206 | 2277 | 11.1 | 53 | 10 | 2 | 7 | 3.5 | 4 | 0 | 4 | 4 |

==== Postseason ====
| Year | Team | Games | | Receiving | | | | | Rushing | | | | | Fumbles | |
| Year | Team | GP | GS | Rec | Yds | Avg | Lng | TD | Att | Yds | Avg | Lng | TD | Fum | Lost |
|---|---|---|---|---|---|---|---|---|---|---|---|---|---|---|---|
| 2018 | HOU | 1 | 0 | 2 | 8 | 4.0 | 7 | 0 | — | — | — | — | — | 0 | 0 |
| 2023 | CLE | 1 | — | — | — | — | — | — | — | — | — | — | — | — | — |
| Career | | 2 | 0 | 2 | 8 | 4.0 | 7 | 0 | — | — | — | — | — | 0 | 0 |

=== College ===
| Year | School | Conf | Class | Pos | G | Rec | Yds | Avg | TD |
|---|---|---|---|---|---|---|---|---|---|
| 2014 | UCF | AAC | FR | WR | 10 | 12 | 135 | 11.3 | 0 |
| 2015 | UCF | AAC | SO | WR | 3 | 14 | 152 | 10.9 | 2 |
| 2016 | UCF | AAC | SO | TE | 10 | 23 | 347 | 15.1 | 2 |
| 2017 | UCF | AAC | SR | TE | 11 | 32 | 515 | 16.1 | 4 |
| Career | UCF | | | | | 81 | 1,149 | 14.2 | 8 |
