= Otis Anderson Jr. =

American football player (1998–2021)

No. 32
- Position: Running back

Personal information
- Born: November 12, 1998; Jacksonville, Florida, U.S.
- Died: November 29, 2021 (aged 23); Jacksonville, Florida, U.S.
- Listed height: 5 ft 8 in (1.73 m)
- Listed weight: 179 lb (81 kg)

Career information
- High school: University Christian (Jacksonville)
- College: UCF (2017–2020)
- NFL draft: 2021: undrafted

Career history
- Los Angeles Rams (2021)*
- * Offseason or practice squad member only

Awards and highlights
- Colley Matrix national champion (2017); First-team All-AAC (2019); Second-team All-AAC (2020)
- Stats at Pro Football Reference

Otis Lee Anderson Jr. (November 12, 1998 – November 29, 2021) was an American professional football running back in the National Football League (NFL). He played college football for the UCF Knights, receiving first-team all-AAC honors in 2019. Not signed to a roster spot ahead of the 2021 season, Anderson received national attention after he was shot and killed by his father the same year.

== College career ==
Anderson attended University Christian School in Jacksonville, Florida and the University of Central Florida (UCF), where he played college football for the Knights. Regarded as a utility player, he was utilized as a slotback, running back, wide receiver, and return specialist. He is second all-time at UCF in yards per carry. He ranks ninth of all-time at UCF with 2,182 career rushing yards. His 3,708 all-purpose yards rank eighth all-time at UCF. He also has 27 total touchdowns, which ranks eighth in school history.

== Professional career ==
Pre-draft measurables
Height	Weight	Arm length	Hand span	40-yard dash	10-yard split	20-yard split	20-yard shuttle	Three-cone drill	Vertical jump	Broad jump	Bench press
5 ft 7 1/2 in (1.71 m)	179 lb (81 kg)	31 1/8 in (0.79 m)	9 in (0.23 m)	4.65 s	1.64 s	2.69 s	4.42 s	7.04 s	36.0 in (0.91 m)	9 ft 5 in (2.87 m)	11 reps
All values from Pro Day

After not being selected in the 2021 NFL draft, Anderson signed with the Los Angeles Rams as an undrafted free agent. The Rams cut him following training camp. He signed to the team's practice squad on September 1, 2021, and was released on September 20.

== Death ==
Anderson was shot and killed by his father, Otis Lee Anderson Sr., in a domestic disturbance over an alleged dog bite on November 29, 2021. His father pleaded guilty to manslaughter and attempted manslaughter in November 2023 and was sentenced to 12 and half years in a state prison.
