= UCF Knights football statistical leaders =

The UCF Knights football statistical leaders are individual statistical leaders of the UCF Knights football program in various categories, including passing, rushing, receiving, total offense, defensive stats, and kicking. Within those areas, the lists identify single-game, single-season, and career leaders. The Knights represent the University of Central Florida in the NCAA Division I FBS Big 12 Conference.

UCF began competing in intercollegiate football in 1979. Unlike many college football teams that began play much earlier, all of UCF's full box scores are available, meaning there is no pre-modern era of incomplete statistics.

These lists are updated through UCF's game against Boise State on September 2, 2021.

== Passing ==
=== Passing yards ===
Career
Rk	Player	Yards	Years
1	Daunte Culpepper	11,412	1995 1996 1997 1998
2	Ryan Schneider	10,976	2000 2001 2002 2003
3	Darin Hinshaw	9,000	1991 1992 1993 1994
4	McKenzie Milton	8,683	2016 2017 2018
5	Dillon Gabriel	8,037	2019 2020 2021
6	Blake Bortles	7,598	2011 2012 2013
7	Darin Slack	6,302	1984 1985 1986 1987
8	Steven Moffett	6,199	2003 2004 2005 2006
9	Dana Thyhsen	4,982	1982 1983 1984
10	Justin Holman	4,916	2013 2014 2015 2016

Single season
Rk	Player	Yards	Year
1	McKenzie Milton	4,037	2017
2	Ryan Schneider	3,770	2002
3	Daunte Culpepper	3,690	1998
4	Dillon Gabriel	3,653	2019
5	Blake Bortles	3,581	2013
6	Dillon Gabriel	3,570	2020
7	Daunte Culpepper	3,086	1997
8	Vic Penn	3,078	1999
9	Blake Bortles	3,059	2012
10	Darin Slack	3,054	1987

Single game
Rk	Player	Yards	Year	Opponent
1	Dillon Gabriel	601	2020	Memphis
2	Ryan Schneider	497	2003	Florida Atlantic
3	McKenzie Milton	494	2017	Memphis (AAC Championship Game)
4	Ryan Schneider	440	2002	Syracuse
5	Daunte Culpepper	438	1998	Southwestern Louisiana
6	Darin Hinshaw	437	1993	Valdosta State
7	Dillon Gabriel	422	2020	Tulane
8	Daunte Culpepper	421	1996	UAB
9	Darin Slack	417	1987	West Georgia
	Dillon Gabriel	417	2020	Georgia Tech

=== Passing touchdowns ===
Career
Rk	Player	TDs	Years
1	Daunte Culpepper	84	1995 1996 1997 1998
2	Darin Hinshaw	82	1991 1992 1993 1994
	Ryan Schneider	82	2000 2001 2002 2003
4	McKenzie Milton	72	2016 2017 2018
5	Dillon Gabriel	70	2019 2020 2021
6	Blake Bortles	56	2011 2012 2013
7	Darin Slack	47	1984 1985 1986 1987
8	Dana Thyhsen	41	1982 1983 1984
	Steven Moffett	41	2003 2004 2005 2006
10	Justin Holman	34	2013 2014 2015 2016

Single season
Rk	Player	TDs	Year
1	McKenzie Milton	37	2017
2	Dillon Gabriel	32	2020
3	Ryan Schneider	31	2002
4	Dillon Gabriel	29	2019
5	Daunte Culpepper	28	1998
6	Darin Slack	26	1987
	Darin Hinshaw	26	1994
8	Daunte Culpepper	25	1997
	Blake Bortles	25	2012
	Blake Bortles	25	2013
	McKenzie Milton	25	2018

Single game
Rk	Player	TDs	Year	Opponent
1	Darin Slack	7	1987	West Georgia
2	Darin Hinshaw	6	1993	Liberty
3	Darin Slack	5	1987	Northwest Missouri State
	Darin Hinshaw	5	1994	Western Kentucky
	Daunte Culpepper	5	1997	Northeast Louisiana
	Ryan Schneider	5	2002	Buffalo
	McKenzie Milton	5	2017	Cincinnati
	McKenzie Milton	5	2017	Memphis (AAC Championship Game)
	McKenzie Milton	5	2018	UConn
	Dillon Gabriel	5	2020	Memphis
	Dillon Gabriel	5	2020	Tulane
	Mikey Keene	5	2021	Temple

== Rushing ==
=== Rushing yards ===
Career
Rk	Player	Yards	Years
1	Kevin Smith	4,679	2005 2006 2007
2	RJ Harvey	3,792	2020 2022 2023 2024
3	Alex Haynes	3,359	2001 2002 2003 2004
4	Willie English	3,131	1989 1990 1991 1993
5	Greg McCrae	2,620	2017 2018 2019 2020
6	Marquette Smith	2,569	1994 1995
7	Adrian Killins	2,459	2016 2017 2018 2019
8	Brynn Harvey	2,451	2008 2009 2011 2012
9	Latavius Murray	2,424	2008 2010 2011 2012
10	Otis Anderson	2,182	2017 2018 2019 2020

Single season
Rk	Player	Yards	Year
1	Kevin Smith	2,567	2007
2	RJ Harvey	1,577	2024
3	Marquette Smith	1,511	1995
4	RJ Harvey	1,416	2023
5	Willie English	1,338	1991
6	Greg McCrae	1,182	2018
7	Kevin Smith	1,178	2005
8	Gerod Davis	1,154	1992
9	Storm Johnson	1,139	2013
10	Brynn Harvey	1,109	2009

Single game
Rk	Player	Yards	Year	Opponent
1	Kevin Smith	320	2007	UAB
2	Kevin Smith	284	2007	Tulsa (C-USA Championship Game)
3	Willie English	242	1991	Arkansas State
4	Latavius Murray	233	2011	UTEP
5	Marquette Smith	225	1995	Northeast Louisiana
6	Kevin Smith	223	2007	Louisiana-Lafayette
7	Kevin Smith	219	2007	UTEP
	Brynn Harvey	219	2009	Memphis
9	Kevin Smith	217	2007	North Carolina State
10	Greg McCrae	206	2018	Memphis (AAC Championship Game)
	RJ Harvey	206	2023	Oklahoma State

=== Rushing touchdowns ===
Career
Rk	Player	TDs	Years
1	Kevin Smith	45	2005 2006 2007
2	RJ Harvey	43	2020 2022 2023 2024
3	Willie English	38	1989 1990 1991 1993
4	Latavius Murray	37	2008 2010 2011 2012
5	Greg McCrae	29	2017 2018 2019 2020
6	Alex Haynes	27	2001 2002 2003 2004
7	Adrian Killins	25	2016 2017 2018 2019
	Isaiah Bowser	25	2021 2022
9	Daunte Culpepper	24	1995 1996 1997 1998
10	Mark Giacone	22	1987 1988 1989 1990

Single season
Rk	Player	TDs	Year
1	Kevin Smith	29	2007
2	RJ Harvey	22	2024
3	Isaiah Bowser	16	2022
	RJ Harvey	16	2023
5	Latavius Murray	15	2012
6	Marquette Smith	14	1995
	Brynn Harvey	14	2009
	Storm Johnson	14	2013
9	Willie English	13	1991
10	Mike Grant	12	1997
	Daunte Culpepper	12	1998

Single game
Rk	Player	TDs	Year	Opponent
1	Alex Haynes	4	2001	Tulane
	Kevin Smith	4	2007	UAB
	Kevin Smith	4	2007	Tulsa (C-USA Championship Game)
	Darriel Mack Jr.	4	2018	Memphis (AAC Championship Game)
	Isaiah Bowser	4	2021	Bethune-Cookman
	RJ Harvey	4	2024	Sam Houston

== Receiving ==
=== Receptions ===
Career
Rk	Player	Rec	Years
1	David Rhodes	213	1991 1992 1993 1994
2	Mark Nonsant	198	1995 1996 1997 1998
3	Sean Beckton	196	1987 1988 1989 1990
4	Mike Sims-Walker	184	2003 2004 2005 2006
	Ryan O'Keefe	184	2019 2020 2021 2022
6	J. J. Worton	168	2011 2012 2013 2014
	Tre'Quan Smith	168	2015 2016 2017
8	Siaha Burley	165	1997 1998
9	Charles Lee	162	1997 1998 1999
10	Rocky Ross	157	2006 2007 2008 2009
	Marlon Williams	157	2017 2018 2019 2020

Single season
Rk	Player	Rec	Year
1	Mike Sims-Walker	90	2006
2	Tyson Hinshaw	89	2000
3	Siaha Burley	88	1998
4	Charles Lee	87	1999
5	Ryan O'Keefe	84	2021
6	David Rhodes	78	1993
7	Siaha Burley	77	1997
8	Ted Wilson	76	1985
9	Doug Gabriel	75	2002
10	Sean Beckton	74	1988
	Brandon Marshall	74	2005

Single game
Rk	Player	Rec	Year	Opponent
1	Todd Cleveland	15	1996	Ball State
2	Bernard Ford	14	1987	Elon
	Tyson Hinshaw	14	2000	Northern Illinois
4	Mike Sims-Walker	13	2006	Rice
	Tre'Quan Smith	13	2016	Houston
	Gabe Davis	13	2019	Cincinnati
	Marlon Williams	13	2020	East Carolina
	Marlon Williams	13	2020	Memphis
9	Bernard Ford	12	1987	West Georgia
	Sean Beckton	12	1989	Bethune-Cookman
	David Rhodes	12	1993	Troy State
	Tyson Hinshaw	12	2000	Eastern Michigan
	Doug Gabriel	12	2002	Syracuse
	Mike Sims-Walker	12	2006	South Florida

=== Receiving yards ===
Career
Rk	Player	Yards	Years
1	David Rhodes	3,618	1991 1992 1993 1994
2	Mark Nonsant	2,809	1995 1996 1997 1998
3	Tre'Quan Smith	2,748	2015 2016 2017
4	Mike Sims-Walker	2,561	2003 2004 2005 2006
5	Sean Beckton	2,493	1987 1988 1989 1990
6	Jimmy Fryzel	2,469	1999 2000 2001 2002
7	Gabe Davis	2,447	2017 2018 2019
8	Ted Wilson	2,443	1983 1984 1985 1986
9	J. J. Worton	2,360	2011 2012 2013 2014
10	Kobe Hudson	2,311	2022 2023 2024

Single season
Rk	Player	Yards	Year
1	Gabe Davis	1,241	2019
2	Doug Gabriel	1,237	2002
3	Brandon Marshall	1,195	2005
4	Bernard Ford	1,180	1987
5	Tre'Quan Smith	1,171	2017
6	Mike Sims-Walker	1,178	2006
7	David Rhodes	1,159	1993
8	Siaha Burley	1,146	1998
9	Javon Baker	1,139	2023
10	Charles Lee	1,133	1999

Single game
Rk	Player	Yards	Year	Opponent
1	Siaha Burley	266	1998	Southwestern Louisiana
2	David Rhodes	231	1992	Western Kentucky
	Siaha Burley	231	1997	South Carolina
4	Brandon Marshall	210	2005	Nevada (Hawaiʻi Bowl)
5	Mark Nonsant	209	1996	UAB
6	Bernard Ford	208	1987	Northwest Missouri State
7	Tyson Hinshaw	206	2000	Eastern Michigan
	Doug Gabriel	206	2002	Syracuse
9	Charles Lee	203	1999	Auburn
10	Bernard Ford	197	1987	West Georgia

=== Receiving touchdowns ===
Career
Rk	Player	TDs	Years
1	David Rhodes	29	1991 1992 1993 1994
2	Bret Cooper	23	1989 1990 1991 1992
	Gabe Davis	23	2017 2018 2019
4	Tre'Quan Smith	22	2015 2016 2017
5	Ted Wilson	21	1983 1984 1985 1986
	Bernard Ford	21	1986 1987
	J. J. Worton	21	2011 2012 2013 2014
8	Doug Gabriel	20	2001 2002
9	Marlon Williams	19	2017 2018 2019 2020
	Kobe Hudson	19	2022 2023 2024

Single season
Rk	Player	TDs	Year
1	Bret Cooper	14	1992
2	Bernard Ford	13	1987
	Tyson Hinshaw	13	2000
	Tre'Quan Smith	13	2017
5	Ted Wilson	12	1985
	David Rhodes	12	1993
	Gabe Davis	12	2019
8	David Rhodes	11	1994
	Doug Gabriel	11	2002
	Brandon Marshall	11	2005
	Brandon Johnson	11	2021

Single game
Rk	Player	TDs	Year	Opponent
1	Bernard Ford	4	1987	Northwest Missouri State
	David Rhodes	4	1993	Liberty
	Doug Gabriel	4	2002	Ohio

== Total offense ==
Total offense is the sum of passing and rushing statistics. It does not include receiving or returns.

=== Total offense yards ===
Career
Rk	Player	Yards	Years
1	Daunte Culpepper	12,432	1995 1996 1997 1998
2	Ryan Schneider	10,703	2000 2001 2002 2003
3	McKenzie Milton	9,761	2016 2017 2018
4	Darin Hinshaw	8,865	1991 1992 1993 1994
5	Dillon Gabriel	8,409	2019 2020 2021
6	Blake Bortles	8,159	2011 2012 2013
7	Steven Moffett	6,371	2003 2004 2005 2006
8	Darin Slack	6,229	1984 1985 1986 1987
9	John Rhys Plumlee	6,224	2022 2023
10	Justin Holman	5,410	2013 2014 2015 2016

Single season
Rk	Player	Yards	Year
1	McKenzie Milton	4,650	2017
2	Daunte Culpepper	4,153	1998
3	Blake Bortles	3,853	2013
4	Dillon Gabriel	3,739	2020
5	Dillon Gabriel	3,731	2019
6	Ryan Schneider	3,681	2002
7	Daunte Culpepper	3,524	1997
8	John Rhys Plumlee	3,448	2022
9	Blake Bortles	3,344	2012
10	Vic Penn	3,246	1999

Single game
Rk	Player	Yards	Year	Opponent
1	Dillon Gabriel	650	2020	Memphis
2	McKenzie Milton	562	2017	Memphis (AAC Championship Game)
3	Ryan Schneider	501	2003	Florida Atlantic
4	Daunte Culpepper	480	1997	Northeast Louisiana
5	Daunte Culpepper	479	1998	Eastern Illinois
6	Daunte Culpepper	467	1998	Southwestern Louisiana
	Blake Bortles	467	2013	Temple
8	John Rhys Plumlee	460	2022	Florida Atlantic
9	Darin Slack	457	1987	West Georgia
10	McKenzie Milton	456	2017	SMU

=== Touchdowns responsible for ===
"Touchdowns responsible for" is the official NCAA term for combined passing and rushing touchdowns.

Career
Rk	Player	TDs	Years
1	Daunte Culpepper	108	1995 1996 1997 1998
2	Darin Hinshaw	93	1991 1992 1993 1994
	Ryan Schneider	93	2000 2001 2002 2003
4	McKenzie Milton	92	2016 2017 2018
5	Dillon Gabriel	78	2019 2020 2021
6	Blake Bortles	71	2011 2012 2013
7	Darin Slack	53	1984 1985 1986 1987
8	Dana Thyhsen	46	1982 1983 1984
	Steven Moffett	46	2003 2004 2005 2006
	Kevin Smith	46	2005 2006 2007

Single season
Rk	Player	TDs	Year
1	McKenzie Milton	45	2017
2	Daunte Culpepper	40	1998
3	McKenzie Milton	34	2018
	Dillon Gabriel	34	2020
5	Darin Hinshaw	33	1994
	Ryan Schneider	33	2002
	Blake Bortles	33	2012
	Dillon Gabriel	33	2019
9	Darin Hinshaw	31	1993
	Blake Bortles	31	2013

Single game
Rk	Player	TDs	Year	Opponent
1	Darin Slack	7	1987	West Georgia
	Daunte Culpepper	7	1998	Eastern Illinois
	John Rhys Plumlee	7	2022	Temple
4	Darin Hinshaw	6	1993	Liberty
	Daunte Culpepper	6	1997	Northeast Louisiana
	Daunte Culpepper	6	1998	Louisiana Tech
	Ryan Schneider	6	2002	Buffalo
	McKenzie Milton	6	2017	Memphis (AAC Championship Game)
	McKenzie Milton	6	2018	Florida Atlantic
	McKenzie Milton	6	2018	Pittsburgh
	Darriel Mack Jr.	6	2018	Memphis (AAC Championship Game)
	Dillon Gabriel	6	2020	Memphis

== Defense ==
=== Interceptions ===
Career
Rk	Player	Ints	Years
1	Joe Burnett	16	2005 2006 2007 2008
2	Sha'reff Rashad	14	2004 2005 2006 2007 2008
3	Keith Evans	13	1986 1987 1988
4	Johnell Neal	12	2005 2006 2007 2008
5	Josh Robinson	10	2009 2010 2011
	Richie Grant	10	2017 2018 2019 2020
7	Reggie Edwards	9	1984 1985 1986 1987
	Jacoby Glenn	9	2013 2014

Single season
Rk	Player	Ints	Year
1	Keith Evans	8	1986
2	Jacoby Glenn	7	2014
3	Joe Burnett	6	2007
	Johnell Neal	6	2007
	Josh Robinson	6	2009
	Richie Grant	6	2018
7	Brian Crutcher	5	1992
	Joe Burnett	5	2005
	Sha'reff Rashad	5	2008
	Reggie Weams	5	2010

=== Tackles ===
Career
Rk	Player	Tackles	Years
1	Rick Hamilton	443	1989 1990 1991 1992
2	Bill Giovanetti	429	1979 1980 1981 1982
3	Clayton Geathers	383	2010 2011 2012 2013 2014
4	Kemal Ishmael	368	2009 2010 2011 2012
5	Nakia Reddick	354	1993 1994 1995 1996
6	Darrell Rudd	347	1981 1982 1983 1984
7	Wyatt Bogan	341	1984 1985 1986 1987 1988
8	Terrance Plummer	334	2011 2012 2013 2014
9	Jason Venson	322	2005 2006 2007 2008
10	Tito Rodriguez	321	1998 1999 2000 2001

Single season
Rk	Player	Tackles	Year
1	Darrell Rudd	150	1983
2	Rick Hamilton	149	1992
3	Wyatt Bogan	143	1986
	Tito Rodriguez	143	2001
5	Jimmy Goodman	142	1987
6	Rick Hamilton	139	1991
7	Jason Johnson	129	2022
8	Wyatt Bogan	127	1988
	Stanford Rhule	127	2002
10	Kemal Ishmael	124	2012

Single game
Rk	Player	Tackles	Year	Opponent
1	Bill Giovanetti	23	1979	Morehouse
	Tito Rodriguez	23	2001	Arkansas
3	Wyatt Bogan	22	1986	Eastern Kentucky
	Deaubrey Devine	22	1997	Nebraska
	Donnell Washington	22	1997	Nebraska
	Damian Demps	22	2000	Alabama
	Bryson Armstrong	22	2021	Navy

=== Sacks ===
Career
Rk	Player	Sacks	Years
1	Bruce Miller	35.5	2007 2008 2009 2010
2	Darrell Rudd	31.5	1981 1982 1983 1984
3	Greg Jefferson	31.0	1991 1992 1993 1994
4	Elton Patterson	30.5	1999 2000 2001 2002
5	Jermaine Benoit	28.5	1993 1994 1995 1996 1997
6	Tre'Mon Morris-Brash	26.0	2019 2020 2021 2022 2023
7	Michael O’Shaughnessy	22.0	1979 1980
	Bobby Spitulski	22.0	1988 1989 1990 1991
9	Emil Ekiyor	20.5	1992 1993 1994 1995
10	Malachi Lawrence	20.0	2022 2023 2024 2025

Single season
Rk	Player	Sacks	Year
1	Darrell Rudd	19.5	1984
2	Greg Jefferson	15.0	1993
3	Bobby Spitulski	13.0	1990
	Bruce Miller	13.0	2009
5	Michael O’Shaughnessy	12.0	1980
6	Emil Ekiyor	11.0	1993
	Jarvis Geathes	11.0	2009
	Shaquem Griffin	11.0	2016
9	Keenan Wimbley	10.5	1987
	Jermaine Benoit	10.5	1997

Single game
Rk	Player	Sacks	Year	Opponent
1	Michael O'Shaughnessy	5.0	1979	Emory & Henry
	Darrell Rudd	5.0	1984	Western Kentucky
3	Willie Davis	4.0	2000	Eastern Kentucky
4	Leger Douzable	3.5	2006	East Carolina

== Kicking ==
=== Field goals made ===
Career
Rk	Player	FGs	Years
1	Matthew Wright	54	2015 2016 2017 2018
2	Shawn Moffitt	53	2011 2012 2013 2014
3	Ed O'Brien	50	1984 1985 1986 1987
	Matt Prater	50	2002 2003 2004 2005
5	Franco Grilla	47	1989 1990 1991 1992
6	Charlie Pierce	46	1993 1994 1995 1996
7	Nick Cattoi	39	2008 2009 2010 2011
8	Michael Torres	37	2006 2007
9	Scott Ryerson	32	1980 1981 1982 1983
	Javier Beorlegui	32	1998 1999 2000 2001

Single season
Rk	Player	FGs	Year
1	Shawn Moffitt	21	2013
2	Michael Torres	20	2007
3	Scott Ryerson	18	1981
4	Ed O'Brien	17	1987
	Matt Prater	17	2005
	Michael Torres	17	2006
	Shawn Moffitt	17	2014
	Matthew Wright	17	2016
9	Ed O'Brien	16	1986
	Franco Grilla	16	1990

Single game
Rk	Player	FGs	Year	Opponent
1	Scott Ryerson	4	1981	Savannah State
	Ed O'Brien	4	1985	Bethune-Cookman
	Ed O'Brien	4	1986	Bethune-Cookman
	Charlie Pierce	4	1994	East Carolina
	Javier Beorlegui	4	2000	Alabama
	Matt Prater	4	2002	Kent State
	Matt Prater	4	2005	UAB
	Michael Torres	4	2006	Memphis
	Nick Cattoi	4	2009	Memphis
	Shawn Moffitt	4	2012	East Carolina
	Shawn Moffitt	4	2014	East Carolina
	Matthew Wright	4	2016	South Carolina State
	Colton Boomer	4	2022	Georgia Tech
	Colton Boomer	4	2023	Boise State

=== Field goal percentage ===
Career
Rk	Player	FG%	Years
1	Noe Ruelas	88.2%	2025
2	Matthew Wright	77.5%	2015 2016 2017 2018
3	Michael Torres	77.1%	2006 2007
4	Shawn Moffitt	76.8%	2011 2012 2013 2014
5	Charlie Pierce	75.4%	1993 1994 1995 1996
6	Colton Boomer	71.4%	2022 2023 2024
7	Fred Waczewski	67.7%	1997 1998
8	Matt Prater	67.6%	2002 2003 2004 2005
9	Franco Grilla	66.2%	1989 1990 1991 1992
10	Nick Cattoi	65.0%	2008 2009 2010 2011

Single season
Rk	Player	FG%	Year
1	Colton Boomer	93.3%	2022
2	Shawn Moffitt	91.3%	2013
3	Dylan Barnas	88.2%	2019
	Noe Ruelas	88.2%	2025
5	Charlie Pierce	87.5%	1994
6	Matthew Wright	84.6%	2018
7	Michael Torres	83.3%	2007
8	Fred Waczewski	81.3%	1997
9	Charlie Pierce	77.8%	1993
	Javier Beorlegui	77.8%	2000
