= List of UCF Knights football seasons =

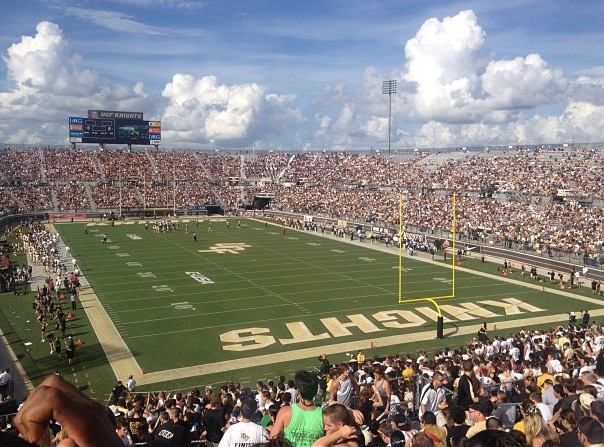
Acrisure Bounce House, the Knights' home field

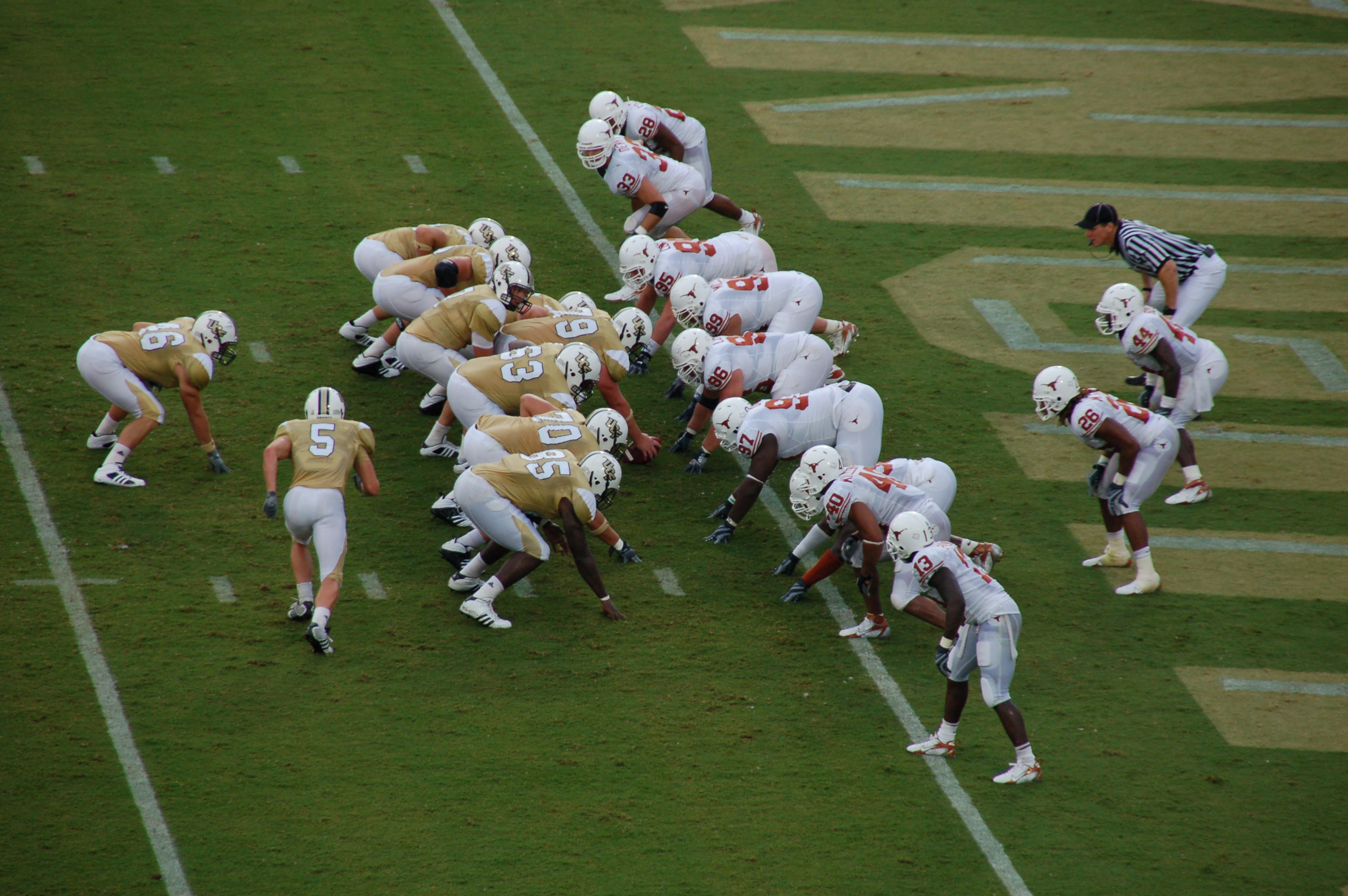
UCF playing Texas at Acrisure Bounce House, then Bright House Networks Stadium, in 2007

The UCF Knights college football team competes as part of the NCAA Division I Football Bowl Subdivision (FBS), representing the University of Central Florida in the Big 12 Conference. Since the program's first season in 1979 under Don Jonas, the Knights have played more than 517 games, with over 290 victories. UCF has won six division titles (2005, 2007, 2010, 2012, 2017, 2018), six conference championships (2007, 2010, 2013, 2014, 2017, 2018), and has made ten postseason appearances since joining FBS, including three BCS/NY6 bowl games. The Knights also claim a National Championship for the 2017 season, as recognized by the Colley Matrix. The Knights' current head coach is Scott Frost. The Knights have played their home games at Acrisure Bounce House, located on the main campus of UCF in Orlando, Florida, since 2007.

UCF began as a Division III program, moving in succession to Division II, Division I-AA (FCS), and subsequently completed their ascension to Division I-A (FBS) in 1996. Initially a Division I-A Independent the Knights first moved into a "Group of Five" conference in 2002, and then into a "Power Five" conference in 2023. In doing so, the Knights became the first NCAA football program to play at all four sanctioned levels. As a Division I–AA program, the Knights made the 1990 and 1993 playoffs.

After George O'Leary took over the program, the Knights gained national prominence as members of C-USA and later the AAC. O'Leary guided UCF to their first division title (2005), first conference championship (2007), first bowl game (2005), first bowl victory (2010), first appearance/victory in a New Year's Six game (2014), first national rankings, and numerous other milestones and superlatives.

The Knights' main rivals are the South Florida Bulls; other historic rivals include East Carolina and Marshall. UCF has played one Consensus All-American, Kevin Smith in 2007, and produced three Heisman Trophy candidates, Daunte Culpepper in 1998, Kevin Smith in 2007, and McKenzie Milton in 2017 and 2018. The program has also produced a long-line of NFL players. Playing in fourteen Super Bowls and including four pro-bowlers, the list most notably includes Blake Bortles, Brandon Marshall, Bruce Miller, Daunte Culpepper, Matt Prater, Asante Samuel, and Josh Sitton.

== Seasons ==
National champions †	Conference champions *	Division champions ‡	Bowl game berth	College Football Playoff game §	Shared standing T	Not applicable

Season	Team	Head coach	Division	Season results							Championship and postseason results	Final ranking	
Season	Team	Head coach	Division	Conference				Overall			Championship and postseason results	AP	Coaches'
Season	Team	Head coach	Division	Finish^{(Note: When in a division, it shows their position within the division. Otherwise the overall position in the division-less conference is listed.)}	Win(s)	Loss(es)	Tie(s)^{(Note: Overtime rules in college football were introduced in 1996, making ties impossible in the period since.)}	Win(s)	Loss(es)	Tie(s)	Championship and postseason results	AP	Coaches'
UCF Knights
NCAA Division III Independent (1979–1981)
1979	1979	Don Jonas						6 (Note: The official NCAA Statistics do not include the game against Fort Benning, resulting in a record of 5–2)	2	0			
1980	1980	Don Jonas						4 (Note: UCF's 1980 record is disputed. The Carson–Newman Eagles were forced to forfeit their opening day 30–21 victory over the Knights due to an ineligible player. The official NCAA Statistics (possibly by error) maintain UCF's 1980 full season record as 3–5–1, However, the school and local media claim a record of 4–4–1, interpreting the Eagles forfeit as a Knights win.)	4	1			
1981	1981	Don Jonas						4	6	0			
NCAA Division II Independent (1982–1989)
1982	1982	Sammy Weir						0	10	0			
1983	1983	Lou Saban						5	6	0			
1984	1984	Lou Saban (Note: After a 1–6 start to the season, Saban stepped away from the program and was replaced by assistant coach Jerry Anderson.); Jerry Anderson						2	9	0			
1985	1985	Gene McDowell						4	7	0			
1986	1986	Gene McDowell						6	5	0			
1987	1987	Gene McDowell						9	4	0	L NCAA Division II semifinal		
1988	1988	Gene McDowell						6	5	0			
1989	1989	Gene McDowell						7	3	0			
NCAA Division I-AA Independent (1990–1995)
1990	1990	Gene McDowell						10	4	0	L NCAA Division I-AA semifinal		
1991	1991	Gene McDowell						6	5	0			
1992	1992	Gene McDowell						6 (Note: Does not include a 43–6 victory in an exhibition game against the Moscow Bears of the Russia national American football team)	4	0			
1993	1993	Gene McDowell						9	3	0	L NCAA Division I-AA first round		
1994	1994	Gene McDowell						7	4	0			
1995	1995	Gene McDowell						6	5	0			
NCAA Division I-A Independent (1996–2001)
1996	1996	Gene McDowell						5	6				
1997	1997	Gene McDowell						5	6				
1998	1998	Mike Kruczek						9	2				
1999	1999	Mike Kruczek						4	7				
2000	2000	Mike Kruczek						7	4				
2001	2001	Mike Kruczek						6	5				
Mid-American Conference (2002–2004)
2002	2002	Mike Kruczek	East	2nd	6	2		7	5				
2003	2003	Mike Kruczek (Note: Head Coach Mike Kruczek was fired following a 3–7 start. Kruczek was replaced by assistant coach and former player Alan Gooch who finished out the season.); Alan Gooch	East	5th	2	6		3	9				
2004	2004	George O'Leary	East	7th	0	8		0	11				
Conference USA (2005–2012)
2005	2005	George O'Leary	East	1st ‡	7	1		8	5		L Hawaii Bowl		
2006	2006	George O'Leary	East	4th	3	5		4	8				
2007	2007	George O'Leary	East	1st*	7	1		10	4		L Liberty Bowl		
2008	2008	George O'Leary	East	T–4th	3	5		4	8				
2009	2009	George O'Leary	East	2nd	6	2		8	5		L St. Petersburg Bowl		
2010	2010	George O'Leary	East	1st*	7	1		11	3		W Liberty	21	20
2011	2011	George O'Leary	East	5th	3	5		5	7				
2012	2012	George O'Leary	East	1st ‡	7	1		10	4		W Beef 'O' Brady's Bowl		
American Athletic Conference (2013–2022)
2013	2013	George O'Leary		1st*	8	0		12	1		W Fiesta Bowl	10	12
2014	2014	George O'Leary		T–1st*	7	1		9	4		L St. Petersburg Bowl		
2015	2015	George O'Leary (Note: Following UCF's 59–10 defeat to Houston on homecoming, this dropped the Knights to an 0–8 record. As a result, O'Leary resigned as head coach. Quarterbacks coach Danny Barrett served as interim head coach for the remainder of the season.); Danny Barrett	East	6th	0	8		0	12				
2016	2016	Scott Frost	East	3rd	4	4		6	7		L Cure Bowl		
2017	2017†	Scott Frost	East	1st*	8	0		13	0		W Peach Bowl	6	7
2018	2018	Josh Heupel	East	1st*	8	0		12	1		L Fiesta Bowl	11	12
2019	2019	Josh Heupel	East	2nd	6	2		10	3		W Gasparilla Bowl	24	24
2020	2020	Josh Heupel		T–3rd	5	3		6	4		L Boca Raton Bowl		
2021	2021	Gus Malzahn		3rd	5	3		9	4		W Gasparilla Bowl		
2022	2022	Gus Malzahn		T–2nd	6	2		9	5		L Military Bowl		
Big 12 Conference (2023–present)
2023	2023	Gus Malzahn		T–9th	3	6		6	7		L Gasparilla Bowl		
2024	2024	Gus Malzahn		T–14th	2	7		4	8				
2025	2025	Scott Frost		T–13th	2	7		5	7				
