= List of UCF Knights in the NFL draft =

The University of Central Florida first fielded a varsity football team in 1979, and ascended to Division I–A, now known as the Football Bowl Subdivision (FBS), in 1996. The Knights entered an Automatic Qualifying conference in 2013, and won the program's first major bowl game. In 1987, Ted Wilson became the first Knight to be selected in an NFL draft when he was selected in the tenth round by the Washington Redskins. As of 2026, (53) UCF Knights have been drafted into the National Football League, including five first round selections. The highest a UCF player has been drafted is third overall in 2014, when quarterback Blake Bortles was selected by the Jacksonville Jaguars.

== Key ==
B	Back	K	Kicker	NT	Nose tackle
C	Center	LB	Linebacker	FB	Fullback
DB	Defensive back	P	Punter	HB	Halfback
DE	Defensive end	QB	Quarterback	WR	Wide receiver
DT	Defensive tackle	RB	Running back	G	Guard
E	End	T	Offensive tackle	TE	Tight end

^{*}	Selected to an all-star game (Pro Bowl)
^{†}	Won a league championship (Super Bowl)
^{‡}	Inducted into Pro Football Hall of Fame

== Selections ==
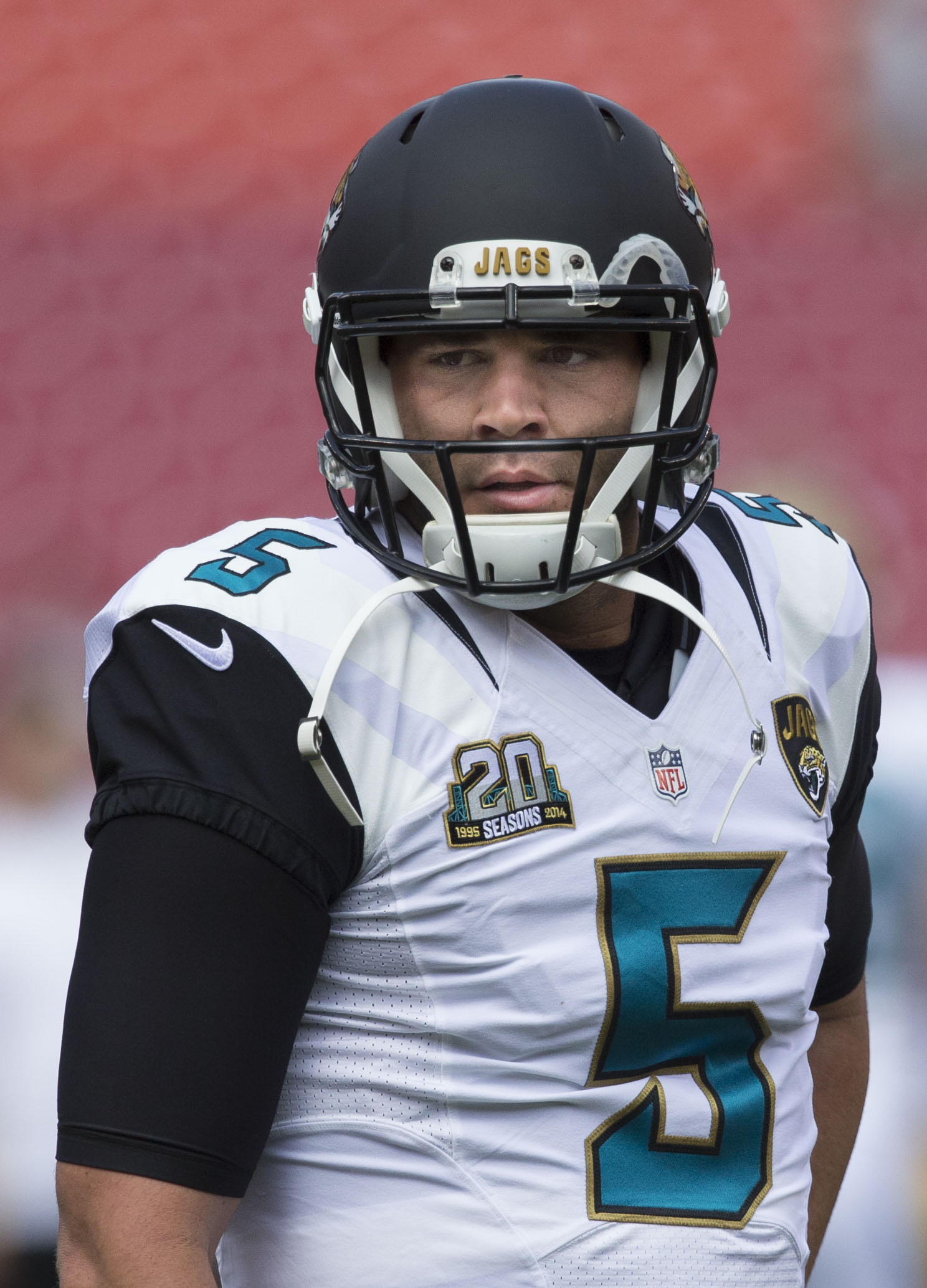
Blake Bortles was drafted 3rd overall by the Jacksonville Jaguars in the 2014 NFL Draft

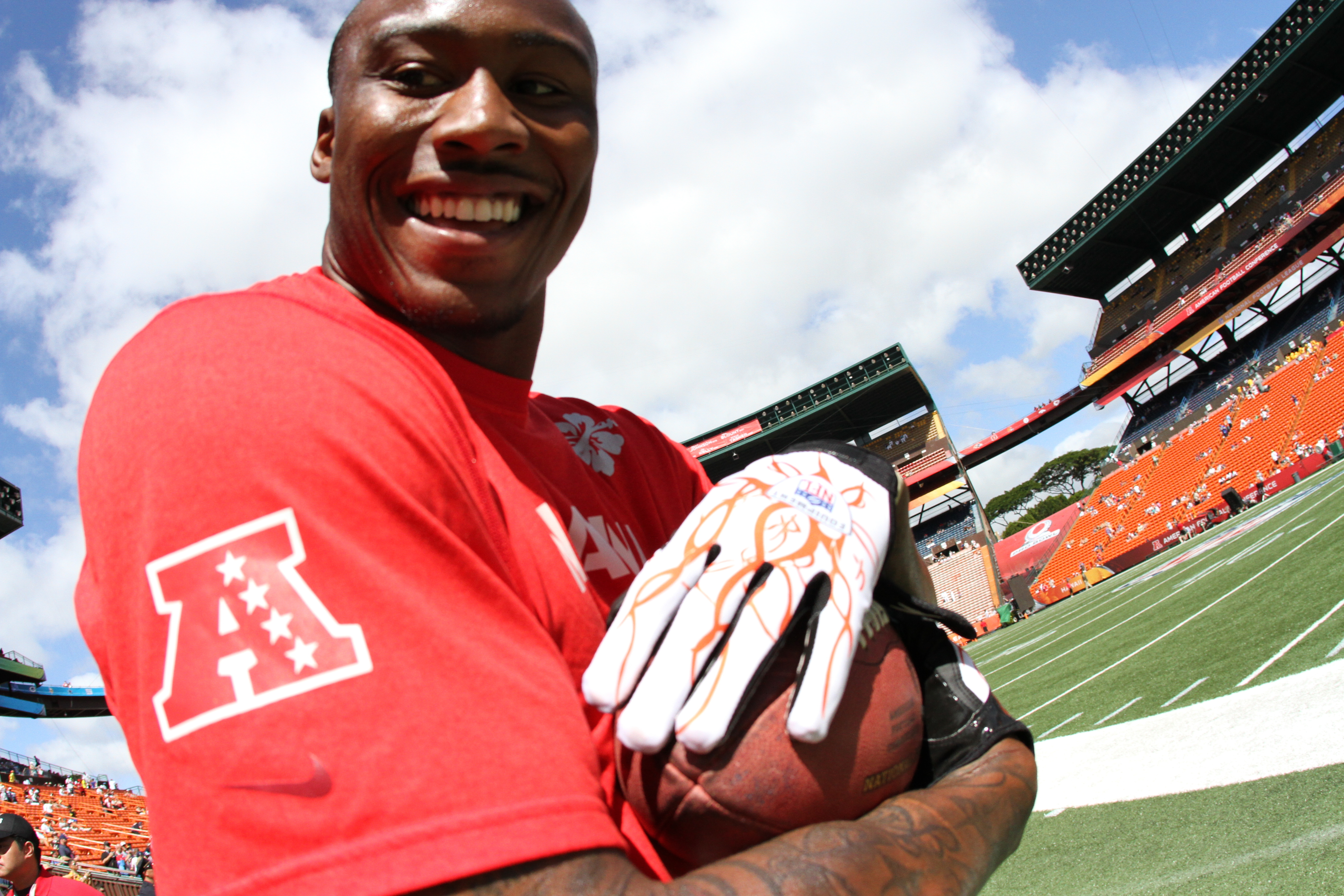
Brandon Marshall was drafted 120th overall by the Denver Broncos in the 2006 NFL Draft

Year	Round	Pick	Player	Team	Position	Notes
1987	10	274	Ted Wilson	Washington Redskins	WR	—
1987	12	330	Elgin Davis	New England Patriots	RB	—
1988	3	65	Bernard Ford	Buffalo Bills	WR	—
1988	5	136	Corris Ervin	Denver Broncos	DB	—
1991	9	225	Raymond Irvin	Cleveland Browns	DB	—
1991	9	240	Shawn Jefferson	Houston Oilers	WR	—
1992	3	66	Bob Spitulski	Seattle Seahawks	LB	—
1993	3	71	Rick Hamilton	Washington Redskins	LB	—
1995	3	72	Greg Jefferson	Philadelphia Eagles	DE	—
1996	5	142	Marquette Smith	Carolina Panthers	RB	—
1999	1	11	Daunte Culpepper*	Minnesota Vikings	QB	Pro Bowl (2000, 2003, 2004)
1999	4	96	Paul Miranda	Indianapolis Colts	DB	—
2000	7	242	Charles Lee	Green Bay Packers	WR	—
2002	2	64	Travis Fisher	St. Louis Rams	DB	—
2003	4	120	Asante Samuel*†	New England Patriots	DB	Pro Bowl (2008, 2009, 2010, 2011); Super Bowl Champion (XXXVIII, XXXIX)
2003	5	167	Doug Gabriel	Oakland Raiders	WR	—
2003	7	250	Mike Mabry	Baltimore Ravens	C	—
2003	7	259	Elton Patterson	Cincinnati Bengals	DE	—
2004	7	232	Michael Gaines	Carolina Panthers	TE	—
2006	4	119	Brandon Marshall*	Denver Broncos	WR	Pro Bowl (2008, 2009, 2011, 2012, 2013, 2015)
2007	3	79	Mike Sims-Walker	Jacksonville Jaguars	WR	—
2008	3	64	Kevin Smith	Detroit Lions	RB	—
2008	4	135	Josh Sitton*†	Green Bay Packers	G	Pro Bowl (2012, 2014, 2015, 2016); Super Bowl Champion (XLV)
2008	7	239	Mike Merritt	Kansas City Chiefs	TE	—
2009	5	168	Joe Burnett	Pittsburgh Steelers	DB	—
2010	2	41	Torell Troup	Buffalo Bills	DT	—
2011	3	85	Jah Reid†	Baltimore Ravens	OT	Super Bowl Champion (XLVII)
2011	7	211	Bruce Miller	San Francisco 49ers	LB	—
2012	3	66	Josh Robinson	Minnesota Vikings	DB	—
2013	6	181	Latavius Murray*	Oakland Raiders	RB	Pro Bowl (2015)
2013	7	243	Kemal Ishmael	Atlanta Falcons	DB	—
2014	1	3	Blake Bortles	Jacksonville Jaguars	QB	—
2014	7	222	Storm Johnson	Jacksonville Jaguars	RB	—
2015	1	26	Breshad Perriman	Baltimore Ravens	WR	—
2015	4	109	Clayton Geathers	Indianapolis Colts	DB	—
2017	3	90	Shaquill Griffin*	Seattle Seahawks	DB	Pro Bowl (2019)
2018	1	30	Mike Hughes	Minnesota Vikings	DB	—
2018	3	91	Tre'Quan Smith	New Orleans Saints	WR	—
2018	3	98	Jordan Akins	Houston Texans	TE	—
2018	5	141	Shaquem Griffin	Seattle Seahawks	LB	—
2019	2	58	Trysten Hill	Dallas Cowboys	DT	—
2020	4	128	Gabe Davis	Buffalo Bills	WR	—
2021	2	40	Richie Grant	Atlanta Falcons	DB	—
2021	3	71	Aaron Robinson	New York Giants	DB	—
2021	4	141	Jacob Harris	Los Angeles Rams	WR	—
2021	6	223	Tay Gowan	Arizona Cardinals	DB	—
2021	7	242	Tre Nixon	New England Patriots	WR	—
2022	6	220	Kalia Davis	San Francisco 49ers	DT	—
2024	4	110	Javon Baker	New England Patriots	WR	—
2024	6	204	Tylan Grable	Buffalo Bills	T	—
2025	2	60	RJ Harvey	Denver Broncos	RB	—
2025	5	145	Mac McWilliams	Philadelphia Eagles	CB	—
2026	1	23	Malachi Lawrence	Dallas Cowboys	DE	—
