= Sean Beckton =

American football player and coach

Sean Beckton Sr.
UCF Knights
- Title: Associate Head Coach and Wide receivers

Personal information
- Born: Daytona Beach, Florida, U.S.

Career information
- College: UCF
- NFL draft: 1991: undrafted

Career history

Playing
- Chicago Bears (1991)*; Cincinnati Bengals (1991)*; Orlando Predators (1993–1994)
- * Offseason or practice squad member only

Coaching
- UCF (1992–1993) Graduate Assistant; Mainland (FL.) High School (1993–1996) Assistant Coach; UCF (1996–2003) Wide Receivers; Orlando Predators (2007–2008) Wide Receivers; UCF (2009–2011) Defensive Backs; UCF (2012–2015) Wide Receivers; UCF (2016–2017) Tight Ends & Recruiting Coordinator; Nebraska (2018–2022) Tight Ends; UCF (2024) Senior Analyst; UCF (2025–present) Associate Head coach & Wide receivers

Sean Beckton Sr. (born 1968) is an American football coach and former wide receiver who is serving as the associate head coach and wide receiver coach for the UCF Knights. Prior to UCF, he was the tight ends coach at the Nebraska from 2018–2022. He played college football at UCF, where he finished his career as the program's career leader in receptions with 196 and receiving yardage with 2,493.

== Playing career ==
=== College ===
Beckton was a star wide receiver for UCF from 1987-90. He concluded his career as the program's career leader in receptions with 196 and receiving yardage with 2,493. Against Texas Southern as a senior, Beckton threw a touchdown pass, ran for a touchdown, caught a touchdown and also scored on a punt return the first to do so in the program. He was one of the first two football players inducted into the UCF Athletics Hall of Fame.

=== Professional ===
Beckton was signed as an undrafted free agent with the 1991 Chicago Bears but did not make the final roster. Later on in the 1991 Cincinnati Bengals season the Bengals signed Beckton to their practice squad where he was a utility player for special teams, wide receiver and defensive back roles. He later played in the Arena Football League on the Orlando Predators, 1993-1994 seasons playing as a receiver and defensive back.

== Coaching career ==
=== Early career ===
Beckton first started as an offensive graduate assistant coach with his alma mater, UCF. Where he primarily worked with the Knights tight ends. From 1993 to 1996, Beckton coached at Mainland High School in Daytona Beach. He helped Mainland win two state titles and, mentored NBA Hall of Famer Vince Carter.

=== UCF ===
Beckton spent a total of 20 seasons at his alma mater, as a coach, Beckton helped the Knights win four of the six conference championships in UCF history and claim the program’s only two New Year's Six bowl wins.

Beckton has coached and recruited multiple National Football League (NFL) receivers at UCF which include Siaha Burley, Kenny Clark, Gabe Davis, Jimmy Fryzel, Rannell Hall, Doug Gabriel, Jeff Godfrey, Charles Lee, Brandon Marshall, Breshad Perriman, Mike Sims-Walker, and Tre’Quan Smith

His most well-known pupil was Brandon Marshall. Marshall spent 13 seasons in the NFL, the 2015 receiving TDs leader, multiple Pro Bowler with 970 receptions and 12,351 receiving yards (26th in all-time NFL receiving yards).

As a defensive backs coach from 2009-2011, UCF won 11 games in 2010, a Conference USA title, and produced the program’s first bowl win and the school’s first national ranking; its secondary ranked top 25 nationally in passing defense. He recruited and coached Josh Robinson, Clayton Geathers, Kemal Ishmael all who were later drafted into the NFL.

In 2014, Breshad Perriman had 1,044 receiving yards. Perriman went on to be selected in the first round of the 2015 NFL Draft. Tre'Quan Smith, won the 2015 AAC Rookie Player of the Year, went on to be named first-team All-AAC and a Biletnikoff Award finalist in 2017.

The 2017 season, he coached Jordan Akins and Jordan Franks who both went onto the NFL. In 2017, Akins and Franks both earned first-team all-conference honors and a spot on the John Mackey Award preseason watch list. Akins was picked in the third round of the 2018 NFL Draft.

=== Nebraska ===
In 2018, Beckton inherited a tight end unit that featured only freshmen and sophomores. Austin Allen (tight end) had a record-setting season under Beckton’s guidance in 2021. Allen set Nebraska season tight end records with 38 receptions and 602 yards. He also set a school single-game record with 143 receiving yards at Wisconsin. Allen earned first-team all-conference honors and was the Kwalick-Clark Big Ten Tight End of the Year. Tight end Jack Stoll was on the John Mackey Award Preseason Watch List (2018, 2019, 2020) and named Big Ten Honors in 2020. Both Jack Stoll and Austin Allen would go onto the NFL. As well as Thomas Fidone, who was recruited by Beckton and would later get drafted in the NFL.

=== UCF (second stint) ===
Sean Beckton was brought back to UCF as an analyst in 2024, serving under Gus Malzahn. After Head Coach Gus Malzahn resigned following the losing season. Scott Frost was re-hired as Head coach and would keep his former position coach on staff. Beckton was promoted to associate head coach and wide receivers coach.
