= Quadtrine Hill =

American football player (born 1982)

No. 41
- Position: Fullback

Personal information
- Born: November 18, 1982 (age 43); Plantation, Florida, U.S.
- Listed height: 6 ft 2 in (1.88 m)
- Listed weight: 230 lb (104 kg)

Career information
- High school: Sunrise (FL) Piper
- College: Miami (Florida) (2001–2005)
- NFL draft: 2006: undrafted

Career history
- Houston Texans (2006)*; Chicago Bears (2006)*; New England Patriots (2007)*; Chicago Bears (2007)
- * Offseason or practice squad member only

Quadtrine Victavian Hill (born November 18, 1982) is an American former football fullback. He was originally signed by the Houston Texans as an undrafted free agent in 2006. He played college football at the University of Miami.

== Early life ==
Hill was an All-State tailback at Piper High School in Sunrise, Florida. As a senior in 2000, he rushed for 1,356 yards and 20 touchdowns, averaging more than seven yards per carry. He was also noted to be an outstanding student with a 4.3 grade-point average.

== College career ==
Hill attended the University of Miami, where he played in 48 games over five seasons from 2001 to 2005, rushing 40 times for 253 yards and catching 56 passes for 414 yards and two touchdowns. He was described as a straight-line runner with excellent speed, and a receiving threat out of the backfield.

== Professional career ==
Hill was originally signed by the Houston Texans as an undrafted free agent on May 4, 2006, but was released six weeks later. He then spent three days with the Chicago Bears in August 2006, and was later signed to the New England Patriots practice squad on January 3, 2007, but was waived the following August. On August 7, 2007, the Chicago Bears claimed Hill off waivers, but then assigned him "waived/injured" status on August 26, 2007. On September 1, 2007, Hill was placed on the team's injured reserve list. He was waived once again on November 28.

== Boxing ==
Hill has embarked on a boxing career, working with South Florida entrepreneur Kris Lawrence. Lawrence operates a training program for novice boxers, concentrating specifically on developing athletes culled from other sports such as American football.
Hill won his debut match on February 16, 2010, at Seminole Hard Rock Hotel and Casino, Hollywood, Florida against Vashawn Tomlin by first-round knockout.

== Personal life ==
He is the son of the former late Los Angeles Rams (1979–80) and Miami Dolphins (1981–84) running back Eddie Hill, who died in 2025.
