= Marquette Smith =

American football player (born 1972)

No. 22
- Position: Running back

Personal information
- Born: July 14, 1972 (age 54); Casselberry, Florida, U.S.
- Listed height: 5 ft 7 in (1.70 m)
- Listed weight: 190 lb (86 kg)

Career information
- High school: Lake Howell (Winter Park, Florida)
- College: UCF
- NFL draft: 1996: 5th round, 142nd overall pick

Career history
- Carolina Panthers (1996–1997); Shreveport Knights (1999); La Crosse Nigh Train (2002); Myrtle Beach Stingrays (2003)

Awards and highlights
- Div. I-AA Second-team All-American (1995)

Marquette Smith (born July 14, 1972) is an American former football running back. Mostly known for his prep and college career, he spent two seasons with the Carolina Panthers of the National Football League (NFL), but knee injuries in successive years during the pre-season kept him off the field.

== Biography ==
Smith was an All-American running back at Lake Howell High School in Winter Park, Florida. In 1990, he was named High School Football Player of the Year by Gatorade, and Offensive Player of the Year by USA Today. Considered to be the premier recruit in the class of 1991, Smith chose Florida State over Penn State and Florida. He could not live up to expectations, and decided to transfer to the University of Central Florida after his redshirt sophomore season in 1994.

In only two seasons at UCF, Smith rushed for 2,569 yards; through the 2018 season, he is fourth on UCF's list of career rushing yardage leaders, and the only player in the top ten with less than a three-season career at UCF. He is the only player in UCF history to rush for more than 1,000 yards in back-to-back seasons, and his 1,511 yards (with 14 touchdowns) in 1995 set the school's single-season record (later surpassed by Kevin Smith in 2007 and later, RJ Harvey). Smith earned second team All-America honors in 1995, and was an honorable mention selection on UCF's 25th Anniversary Football Team as compiled by the Orlando Sentinel.

Smith was drafted in the fifth round of the 1996 NFL Draft with the 142nd overall pick by Carolina. After his time with the NFL's Panthers, Smith played for the Shreveport Knights of the short-lived Regional Football League in 1999 and the La Crosse Night Train and the Myrtle Beach Stingrays of the National Indoor Football League.

Following his playing career, he would be named the head coach for two different professional teams in the National Indoor Football League.

== See also ==
- UCF Knights football statistical leaders
