= Piper High School (Florida) =

Public high school in Sunrise, Florida, United States

Location
- 8000 NW 44th Street; Sunrise, Broward County, Florida 33351-5699; United States; 26°10′40″N 80°15′24″W

Information
- School type: Public High School
- Mottoes: We are Bengals: Committed to Respect, Integrity, Scholarship, & Excellence
- Opened: January 5, 1972
- School district: Broward County Public Schools
- NCES District ID: 1200180
- Superintendent: Dr. Howard Hepburn
- NCES School ID: 120018000264
- Principal: Matthew Lewis
- Staff: 92.00 (FTE)
- Grades: 9-12
- Enrollment: 2,193 (2022–23)
- Student to teacher ratio: 25.11
- Colors: Orange, brown, and white
- Mascot: Bengals
- Website: piper.browardschools.com

Piper High School is a public high school located in Sunrise, Florida, one of the fastest growing cities in the United States. The school is a part of the Broward County Public Schools district.

The school serves over 2,100 students from grades 9 through 12. Its mascot is the Bengals.

It serves most of Sunrise, northwest sections of Lauderhill, a section of North Lauderdale, and a section of Tamarac.

== History ==
The current principal is Matthew Lewis. Before that, Marie Hautigan served as the principal. Roma Adkins became the principal in 1994. The school is named after aviation pioneer William T. Piper, who donated the land upon which the school was built.

== Demographics ==
=== 2021-2022 ===
- Total student enrollment: 2,229
- The ethnic makeup of the school:
  - Black: 73.8%
  - White: 21.4%
  - Hispanic: 16%
  - Multiracial: 2.2%
  - Asian: 1.8%
  - Native American or Native Alaskan: 0.6%
  - Native Hawaiian or Pacific Islander: 0.2%

=== 2025-2026 ===
- Total student enrollment: 2,193
- The ethnic makeup of the school:
  - Black: 75.65%
  - White: 18.8%
  - Hispanic: 15.80%
  - Multiracial: 3.26%
  - Asian: 1.72%
  - Native American or Native Alaskan: 0.40%
  - Native Hawaiian or Pacific Islander: 0.40%

== Notable alumni ==
- Jessicka Addams, singer and artist
- Lashauwn Beyond, drag queen
- Ken Bishop, NFL defensive tackle
- Bennie Blades, NFL defensive back
- Brian Blades, NFL wide receiver
- Aaliyah Butler (transferred), track and field athlete
- Albert Connell, NFL wide receiver
- Daniel Franzese, actor
- Kenneth Fuchs, composer
- Brian Gottfried, tennis player and coach
- Franco Grilla, football player
- Bobby Harden, NFL safety
- Quadtrine Hill, NFL football player, Class of 2001
- Michael Irvin, NFL Hall of Fame wide receiver
- Nevin Lawson, NFL defensive back
- Anthony Naples, electronic musician
- Ski Mask the Slump God, rapper and songwriter
- Shannon Spake, ESPN NASCAR reporter
- Omar Wilson, philanthropist and entrepreneur
- Van Winitsky tennis player
- Michelle Joy (Lewis), Artist & Lead Singer of Cannons_(band)
