= Greg McCrae =

American gridiron football player (born 1998)

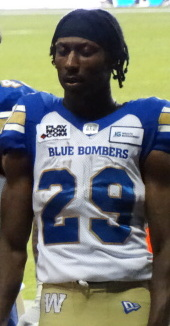
- McCrae with the Winnipeg Blue Bombers in 2022

Profile
- Positions: Running back, slotback

Personal information
- Born: January 21, 1998 (age 28); Miami, Florida, U. S.
- Listed height: 5 ft 10 in (1.78 m)
- Listed weight: 173 lb (78 kg)

Career information
- College: Central Florida

Career history
- 2021: Toronto Argonauts*
- 2022–2023: Winnipeg Blue Bombers
- * Offseason or practice squad member only

Awards and highlights
- Colley Matrix national champion (2017)
- Stats at CFL.ca

Greg McCrae (born January 21, 1998) is an American professional football running back and slotback. He previously played for the Winnipeg Blue Bombers of the Canadian Football League (CFL).

== College career ==
McCrae played college football for the UCF Knights from 2017 to 2020.

== Professional career ==
Pre-draft measurables
Height	Weight	Arm length	Hand span	40-yard dash	10-yard split	20-yard split	20-yard shuttle	Three-cone drill	Vertical jump	Broad jump
5 ft 9 7/8 in (1.77 m)	182 lb (83 kg)	30 7/8 in (0.78 m)	8 7/8 in (0.23 m)	4.54 s	1.62 s	2.56 s	4.37 s	6.88 s	37.5 in (0.95 m)	10 ft 4 in (3.15 m)
All values from Pro Day

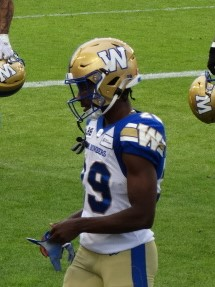
McCrae with the Blue Bombers in 2022

=== Toronto Argonauts ===
McCrae signed with the Toronto Argonauts prior to the 2021 season. However, no preseason games were played that year and he was released in training camp on July 27, 2021.

=== Winnipeg Blue Bombers ===
On May 6, 2022, it was announced that McCrae had signed with the Winnipeg Blue Bombers. He began the 2022 season on the team's practice roster, but after an injury to Nic Demski in week 3, McCrae made his professional debut on July 4, 2022, against the Toronto Argonauts, where he had three carries for 18 yards and three receptions for -5 yards. Following an injury to Greg Ellingson, McCrae started his first game at slotback on August 25, 2022, against the Calgary Stampeders. In total, he played in 15 regular season games, starting in seven, and recorded 21 carries for 164 yards and 16 receptions for 164 yards and one touchdown. With the Blue Bombers' receivers fully healthy, McCrae did not dress in the post-season, including the 109th Grey Cup loss to the Toronto Argonauts.

In 2023, McCrae again began the season on the practice roster, but was again promoted to the active roster after three weeks and was a starter at slotback. After briefly returning to the practice roster, he dressed in the last two games of the season and played in 11 regular season games while starting in four. For the year, he had 23 carries for 146 yards and 15 catches for 182 yards and two touchdowns. He became a free agent after the 2023 season.
