= Don Jonas =

American football player and coach (born 1938)

No. 33, 14, 13, 7
- Positions: Quarterback, halfback

Personal information
- Born: December 3, 1938 (age 87); Scranton, Pennsylvania, U.S.
- Listed height: 5 ft 11 in (1.80 m)
- Listed weight: 195 lb (88 kg)

Career information
- High school: West Scranton
- College: Penn State
- NFL draft: 1961: 13th round, 182nd overall pick
- AFL draft: 1962: 32nd round, 253rd overall pick

Career history

Playing
- Philadelphia Eagles (1962); Harrisburg Capitols (1963–1964); Newark Bears / Orlando Panthers (1965–1969); Toronto Argonauts (1970); Winnipeg Blue Bombers (1971–1974); Hamilton Tiger-Cats (1974)

Coaching
- UCF (1979–1981) Head coach

Awards and highlights
- CFL's Most Outstanding Player Award (1971); Jeff Nicklin Memorial Trophy (1971); 3× COFL MVP (1966, 1967, 1968); ACFL MVP (1963); 2× CFL All-Star (1971), 1972); 2× CFL West All-Star (1971, 1972)

Career CFL statistics
- Passing yards: 15,064
- TD–INT: 98–130
- Rushing yards: 426
- Rushing average: 3.5
- Rushing touchdowns: 12

Head coaching record
- Career: 14–12–1 (.537)
- Stats at Pro Football Reference

Donald Walter Jonas (born December 3, 1938) is an American former football player and coach. Jonas played professionally as a quarterback in the Canadian Football League (CFL). He was also the first head coach of the UCF Knights (1979–1981).

== Playing career ==
=== College football ===
Jonas played college football at Penn State University. His first season was 1958, and he did not play (was red-shirted) in 1959. In 1960, as a running back, he ran 49 times for 238 yards (4.9 yard average) and two touchdowns. He also caught six passes, completed 3 of 7 passes, intercepted three opponent passes and returned seven punts. In 1961, he gained 149 yards in 31 attempts (4.8 average) and caught five passes, scoring two touchdowns. He also returned punts and kickoffs.

Proving to be a versatile player, he was selected by the NFL's Philadelphia Eagles in the 13th round (182nd overall) of the 1961 NFL draft. His time with the Eagles was very short. He played in only one game in the 1962 season.

Coincidentally, his Penn State quarterback Peter Liske would also go on to star in the CFL, playing against Jonas and himself winning the CFL's Most Outstanding Player Award in 1967.

=== Minor-league football ===
Jonas turned to minor league football after his brief stint in the NFL; in the 1960s, the days before big player salaries, this was a viable option for a football player. Both minor-league teams and the CFL offered Jonas playing time and competitive money.

- 1963 – His first season was with the Harrisburg Capitols of the Atlantic Coast Football League. He started as a receiver, catching 20 passes for 422 yards, but when the quarterback was injured, Jonas stepped behind the center, completing 112 of 233 passes for 1649 yards (11 touchdowns, 14 interceptions) as well as running for another 455 yards. His team had 8 wins, 3 losses and 1 tie, and Jonas was named the league's Most Valauable Player. He also handled kicking duties, as he would for his entire career.
- 1964 – Injuries slowed Jonas down, and he only completed 94 of 204 passes for 1264 yards (13 touchdowns, 16 interceptions). Harrisburg was 4–10.
- 1965 – Jonas moved to the Newark Bears of the Continental Football League, where another CFL's Most Outstanding Player Award winner, Tom Wilkinson, would play with the Toronto Rifles. Even though his team was 5–9, Jonas had a huge year, hitting 206 of 437 passes for 3268 yards, with 26 touchdowns and 31 interceptions.
- 1966 to 1969 – The Newark Bears moved to become the Orlando Panthers, and won 12, 11, 10 and 10 games in those seasons with Jonas at quarterback, winning the championship in 1967 and 1968 and losing in the final in 1966. Jonas was the league MVP each season from 1966 to 1968. His biggest year, in 1967, saw him throw 407 passes, hitting 203 of them for 3446 yards and 41 touchdowns, with 21 picks.

His career minor league stats were 1032 completions in 2085 attempts for 17,183 yards and 171 touchdowns and 130 interceptions, with 4 MVP awards. His only weakness was his somewhat low completion percentage. In 1967, the American Football League’s Denver Broncos, under Lou Saban, offered him a contract, but Jonas declined the opportunity; Orlando, then paying quite high salaries for a minor league team, also offered Jonas a virtual guarantee of playing time with a winning franchise, something he could not be assured as a backup on the only team in the AFL that up to that point had been a perennial loser.

In 1970, the Panthers, financially strapped because of the high salaries they were paying Jonas and other members of the team, were sold to an ownership group unwilling to maintain the pricey talent their predecessors had, and Jonas was fired. At age 31, with no NFL experience, Jonas determined that the Canadian Football League offered him the best opportunity to continue his football career.

- 1983 – Induction into the American Football Association's Semi Pro Football Hall of Fame 1983

=== Canadian Football League ===
Jonas’ first season in the Canadian Football League, 1970, was with the Toronto Argonauts, where he was teamed up with Tom Wilkinson. His 124 completions, 256 passes for 2041 yards (and 17 touchdowns versus 25 ints) did not help the 8–6 team win the Grey Cup as the Argos lost to the eventual Grey Cup champion Montreal Alouettes 16–7 in the divisional semi-final.

Moving to the Western Division with the Winnipeg Blue Bombers in 1971, he hit 253 of 485 passes for a stunning 4036 yards with 27 touchdowns and 31 interceptions. Jonas won the CFL's Most Outstanding Player Award.

He would play two more full seasons for the Bombers before being traded midway through the 1974 season to the Hamilton Tiger-Cats for their quarterback, Chuck Ealey. His 12,291 passing yards is fifth best for a franchise that has many great quarterbacks. None of Jonas’ CFL teams, however, would get to the Grey Cup championship with him at the helm.

His final CFL totals are 977 completions on 1930 attempts for 15064 yards and 98 touchdowns versus 130 interceptions.

== Coaching career ==
Jonas continued on in football as the voluntary, then permanent head coach of the new football program at the University of Central Florida (UCF) in Orlando, Florida. The Knights won six of their eight games in their first season, in 1979, but only won eight games in the next two seasons. At the time Jonas coached, the Knights competed at the NCAA Division III level.

== Later life ==
Jonas is now semi-retired, working part-time at an auto-glass replacement shop and playing golf. He has done radio broadcasts of Central Florida football games and had a radio sports talk show for three years. He also officiated high-school football games in the Orlando area, and was honored in 2009 for his achievements.

== Head coaching record ==
Year	Team	Overall	Conference	Standing	Bowl/playoffs
UCF Knights (NCAA Division III independent) (1979–1981)
1979	UCF	6–2			
1980	UCF	4–4–1			
1981	UCF	4–6			
UCF:		14–12–1			
Total:		14–12–1			

== Sources ==
- Bob Gill, "The Best Little Quarterback You Never Heard Of", The Coffin Corner (May/June, 1984), Professional Football Researchers Association website.
