= 1988 UCF Knights football team =

American college football season

1988 UCF Knights football
- Conference: Independent
- Record: 6–5
- Head coach: Gene McDowell (4th season)
- Offensive coordinator: Mike Kruczek (4th season)
- Defensive coordinator: Bruce Bennett (3rd season)
- Home stadium: Florida Citrus Bowl

1988 NCAA Division II independents football records
	Conf.			Overall
Team	W	L	T	W		L		T
Saint Mary's		–		10	–	0	–	0
New Haven		–		7	–	3	–	0
Springfield		–		6	–	3	–	1
Central Connecticut		–		5	–	3	–	1
Michigan Tech		–		6	–	4	–	0
UCF		–		6	–	5	–	0
American International		–		5	–	5	–	0
Wofford		–		5	–	5	–	0
Kentucky State		–		4	–	7	–	0
Southern Connecticut State		–		0	–	10	–	0

The 1988 UCF Knights football season was the tenth for the team. It was Gene McDowell's fourth season as the head coach of the Knights. After making the playoffs the year before, UCF started off the season ranked in the top 5 of Division II. After defeating the defending Division II national champions Troy State in week 3, the Knights jumped to No. 2 in the nation, a spot they held for three consecutive weeks. The Knights faltered, however, and lost five of their last six games. McDowell's 1988 Knights finished the season with a 6–5 overall record and missed the Division II playoffs.

The Knights competed as an NCAA Division II Independent. The team played their home games at the Citrus Bowl in Downtown Orlando.

A movement on campus in 1988 suggested the team change its nickname from Knights to "Sharks", but it was rejected by the school.

== Schedule ==
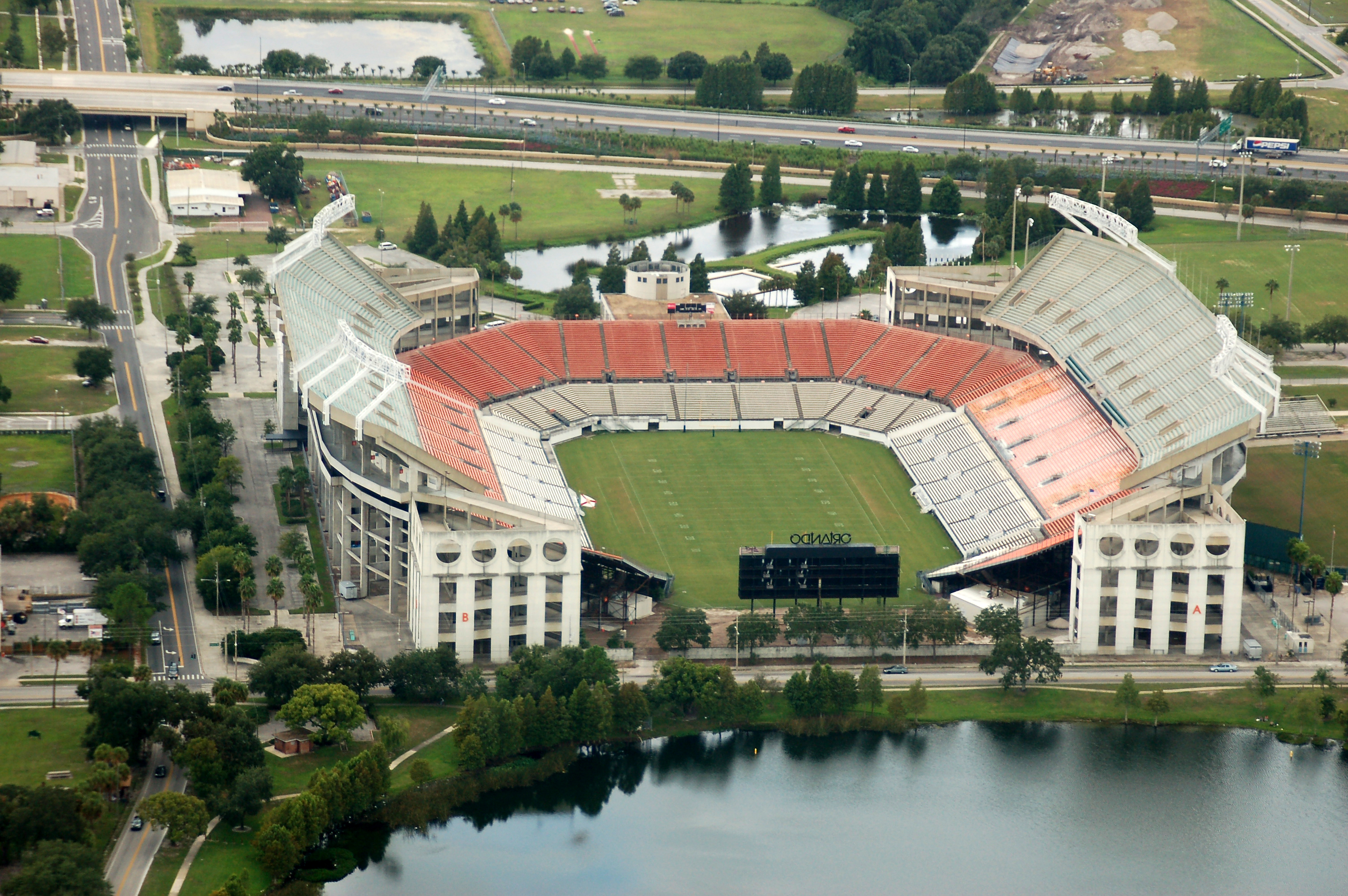
The Florida Citrus Bowl, the Knights' home field

Date	Opponent	Rank	Site	Result	Attendance	Source
September 2	Bethune–Cookman	No. 5	Florida Citrus Bowl; Orlando, FL	W 29–21	14,831	
September 10	West Georgia	No. 3	Florida Citrus Bowl; Orlando, FL	W 33–14	11,270	
September 17	No. 1 Troy State	No. 3	Florida Citrus Bowl; Orlando, FL	W 26–18	31,789	
September 24	at East Tennessee State	No. 2	Memorial Center; Johnson City, TN	W 23–17	5,447	
October 1	North Alabama	No. 2	Florida Citrus Bowl; Orlando, FL	W 35–33	21,682	
October 8	New Haven	No. 2	Florida Citrus Bowl; Orlando, FL	L 23–31	22,641	
October 15	Southern Connecticut	No. 14	Florida Citrus Bowl; Orlando, FL	W 24–16	22,439	
October 22	at Valdosta State	No. 10	Bazemore–Hyder Stadium; Valdosta, GA	L 19–48	6,500	
October 29	No. 6 (I-AA) Georgia Southern		Florida Citrus Bowl; Orlando, FL	L 17–31	28,682	
November 5	at Liberty		City Stadium; Lynchburg, VA	L 7–24	3,530	
November 12	at No. 8 (I-AA) Eastern Kentucky		Roy Kidd Stadium; Richmond, KY	L 31–35	6,800	
Rankings from NCAA Division II Football Committee Poll released prior to the game

== The "Noise Penalty" game ==
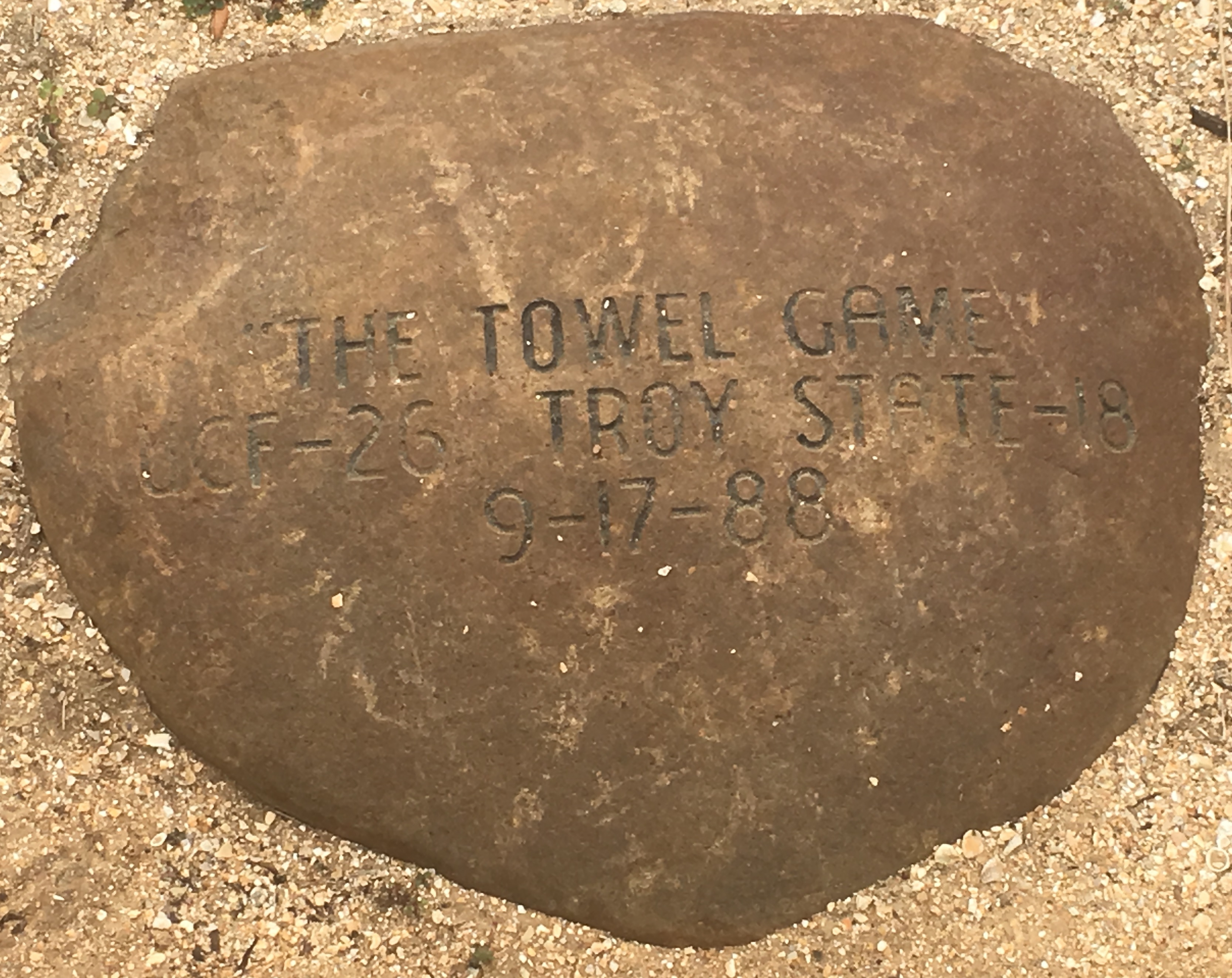
A stone marker at FBC Mortgage Stadium memorializes the 1988 "Towel Game".

	1	2	3	4	Total
#1 Trojans	6	6	6	0	18
#3 Knights	3	3	7	13	26

The Noise Penalty Game, also known as the Towel Game, is one of the most legendary games in the history of UCF Knights football. It took place on September 17, 1988 at the Citrus Bowl. The Knights, ranked No. 3 in Division II at the time, hosted No. 1 ranked Troy State, and it wound up being the Knights' biggest win to-date in the young team's history. The Troy State Trojans had knocked UCF out of the Division II playoffs the year prior, and went on to win the 1987 Division II championship. Going into the game, both teams were undefeated at 2–0, and Troy State was riding a 15-game unbeaten streak. A then-school record crowd of 31,789 spectators arrived at the Citrus Bowl, anxious to see the if the Knights could seek revenge and upset Troy State, and ultimately elevate to the Division II No. 1 ranking in the nation.

Prior to the game, yellow handkerchiefs were handed out to the fans to wave, printed with the words "Noise Penalty." The raucous crowd did their part, creating an intimidating environment for the Trojans players all night long. The UCF fans were so loud at one point, Trojans quarterback Bob Godsey could not call plays. Officials stopped the game seven times, and eventually penalized the Knights a timeout due to the excessive crowd noise. In addition, stadium officials announced that fans had consumed 100 kegs of beer during the game.

=== First half ===
UCF scored first with a 45-yard field goal by Blake Holton. The score was set up by a fumble by Troy State quarterback Bob Godsey, recovered by Steve Spears at the Trojans 46 yard line. Troy State then took the lead 6-3 with a 78-yard drive capped off by a 1-yard touchdown run by Godsey, but the extra point failed.

In the second quarter, UCF defender Jimmy Goodman intercepted Godsey at the Trojans 18 yard line, setting up a 34-yard field goal by Travis Allen, and a 6-6 tie. The tie was short-lived, however, as Godsey connected with Kenny Eddenfield for a 61-yard touchdown. UCF blocked the extra point, and Troy State led 12-6 at halftime.

=== Second half ===
Troy State extended their lead to 18-6 early in the third quarter after a 1-yard touchdown by Tony Young. A two-point conversion failed. Later in the third quarter, UCF quarterback Shane Willis threw a 55-yard pass to Arnell Spencer, all the way down inside the Trojans 13-yard line. After that, Willis executed a trick play, pitching the ball to wide receiver Sean Beckton, who threw a 21-yard touchdown pass to Spencer in the left corner of the endzone to make the score 18-13.

The Knights blocked a Trojans punt, and recovered it in the endzone, but officials ruled the ball down at the 1 yard line. They failed to score on the drive though when Willis threw an interception. The UCF defense forced another punt, and the Knights got the ball at the Trojans 43 yard line. In just 14 seconds, the Knights were in the endzone after a 28-yard reception by Shawn Jefferson, followed by a 1-yard touchdown run by Gil Barnes. Leading 19-18, the Knights were not fooled by a Trojans fake punt attempt. Facing 4th down & 3 at their own 27, Troy State tried to run up the middle for a first down, but was stuffed for no gain. Five plays later, UCF was in the endzone again, with an 8-yard touchdown run by Mark Giacone. UCF won by the final score of 26-18. Days later, the Knights were voted No. 2 in the NCAA Division II poll, and they would remain there for three weeks.
