= Gene McDowell =

American football player, coach, and administrator (1939–2021)

Biographical details
- Born: July 4, 1939
- Died: January 26, 2021 (aged 81); Quincy, Florida, U.S.

Playing career
- 1960–1962: Florida State
- Position: Linebacker

Coaching career (HC unless noted)
- 1970–1973: Kansas State (assistant)
- 1974–1975: Florida State (DE)
- 1976–1984: Florida State (LB)
- 1985–1997: UCF

Administrative career (AD unless noted)
- 1985–1992: UCF

Head coaching record
- Overall: 86–61
- Tournaments: 1–1 (NCAA D-II playoffs); 2–2 (NCAA D-I-AA playoffs)

Accomplishments and honors

Awards
- Third-team All-American (1962); Eddie Robinson Award (1990)

Eugene McDowell (July 4, 1939 – January 26, 2021) was an American college football coach and college athletics administrator. He served as the head football coach at University of Central Florida (UCF) from 1985 to 1997, compiling a record of 86–61. McDowell was also the athletic director at UCF from 1985 to 1992.

McDowell died of leukemia on January 26, 2021, in Quincy, Florida.

== Head coaching record ==
Year	Coach	Overall	Conference	Standing	Bowl/playoffs
UCF Knights (NCAA Division II independent) (1985–1989)
1985	UCF	4–7			
1986	UCF	6–5			
1987	UCF	9–4			L NCAA Division II Semifinal
1988	UCF	6–5			
1989	UCF	7–3			
UCF Knights (NCAA Division I-AA independent) (1990–1995)
1990	UCF	10–4			L NCAA Division I-AA Semifinal
1991	UCF	6–5			
1992	UCF	6–4			
1993	UCF	9–3			L NCAA Division I-AA First Round
1994	UCF	7–4			
1995	UCF	6–5			
UCF Golden Knights (NCAA Division I-A independent) (1996–1997)
1996	UCF	5–6			
1997	UCF	5–6			
UCF:		86–61			
Total:		86–61			
