= Bret Cooper =

American football player (born 1970)

Profile
- Positions: Wide receiver, defensive back

Personal information
- Born: December 16, 1970 (age 55); Miami, Florida, U.S.
- Listed height: 6 ft 0 in (1.83 m)
- Listed weight: 205 lb (93 kg)

Career information
- High school: Miami Killian (Kendall, Florida)
- College: UCF

Career history
- Tampa Bay Storm (1994); Memphis Pharaohs (1995–1996); San Jose SaberCats (1997); Orlando Predators (1998–2001); Buffalo Destroyers (2002–2003); Georgia Force (2003); Orlando Predators (2003–2005)

Awards and highlights
- 2× ArenaBowl champion (1998, 2000); First-team All-Arena (2000)

Career AFL statistics
- Receptions: 479
- Receiving yards: 6,639
- Receiving TDs: 106
- Tackles: 311
- Interceptions: 21
- Stats at ArenaFan.com

Bret Cooper (born December 16, 1970) is an American former professional football player who played twelve seasons in the Arena Football League (AFL) with the Tampa Bay Storm, Memphis Pharaohs, San Jose SaberCats, Orlando Predators, Buffalo Destroyers and Georgia Force. He played college football at the University of Central Florida.

== Early life ==
Cooper attended Miami Killian High School in Miami, Florida.

== Professional career ==
Cooper played for the Tampa Bay Storm of the AFL in 1994. He played for the AFL's Memphis Pharaohs from 1995 to 1996. He played for the San Jose SaberCats of the AFL in 1997. Cooper played for the Orlando Predators of the AFL from 1998 to 2001, earning First Team All-Arena honors in 2000. He was released by the Predators on November 15, 2001. He signed with the AFL's Buffalo Destroyers on January 24, 2002. Cooper was released by the Destroyers on March 4, 2003. He was signed by the Georgia Force of the AFL on March 13, 2003. He signed with the Orlando Predators on October 22, 2003.
