= Franco Grilla =

American football player (born 1970)

No. 11
- Position: Placekicker

Personal information
- Born: July 21, 1970 (age 56); Miami, Florida, U.S.
- Listed height: 6 ft 1 in (1.85 m)
- Listed weight: 195 lb (88 kg)

Career information
- High school: Piper (Sunrise, Florida)
- College: UCF (1989–1992)
- NFL draft: 1993: undrafted

Career history
- Albany Firebirds (1994); Frankfurt Galaxy (1995)*; Birmingham Barracudas (1995); Orlando Predators (1997–1998)
- * Offseason or practice squad member only

Awards and highlights
- ArenaBowl champion (1998); Second-team All-Arena (1994)

Career AFL statistics
- FG made: 24
- FG att: 69
- PAT made: 158
- PAT att: 178
- Tackles: 8.5
- Stats at ArenaFan.com

Franco Grilla (born July 21, 1970) is an American former professional football placekicker who played three seasons in the Arena Football League (AFL) with the Albany Firebirds and Orlando Predators. He played college football at the University of Central Florida. He was also a member of the Birmingham Barracudas of the Canadian Football League (CFL).

== Early life ==
Franco Grilla was born on July 21, 1970, in Miami, Florida. He attended Piper High School in Sunrise, Florida.

== College career ==
Grilla was a four-year letterman for the UCF Knights from 1989 to 1992. He set the school record with 103 consecutive extra points made and is second in career field goals made with 47. He kicked a game-winning field goal as time expired on a frozen field in Youngstown, Ohio in 1990 that gave UCF a first-round win in the Division I-AA playoffs against the previously unbeaten Youngstown State Penguins. Grilla was inducted into the UCF Athletics Hall of Fame in 2005. He was also named to the Orlando Sentinel's 25th Anniversary UCF Football Team.

== Professional career ==
Grilla played for the Albany Firebirds of the Arena Football League (AFL) in 1994, earning second-team All-Arena honors. In February 1995, he was selected by the Frankfurt Galaxy of the World League of American Football in the 1995 WLAF draft. He was waived by the Galaxy on March 19, 1995.

Grilla signed with the Birmingham Barracudas of the Canadian Football League (CFL) in May 1995. He dressed in six games for the Barracudas during the 1995 CFL season, converting six of 12 field goals, 17 of 17 extra points, and three rouges. He also kicked off 26 times for 1,595 yards and posted two special teams tackles. Grilla was released by the Barracudas in August 1995.

Grilla played for the Orlando Predators of the AFL from 1997 to 1998.
