= 1981 UCF Knights football team =

American college football season

1981 UCF Knights football
- Conference: Independent
- Record: 4–6
- Head coach: Don Jonas (3rd season)
- Home stadium: Orlando Stadium

1981 NCAA Division III independents football records
	Conf.			Overall
Team	W	L	T	W		L		T
DePauw		–		9	–	1	–	0
San Diego		–		9	–	1	–	0
Wagner		–		9	–	1	–	0
West Georgia ^		–		9	–	1	–	0
Dayton ^		–		12	–	2	–	0
Wabash		–		8	–	1	–	0
Millsaps		–		7	–	2	–	0
WPI		–		6	–	2	–	0
Albany		–		7	–	3	–	0
Georgetown		–		5	–	3	–	0
Cortland		–		6	–	4	–	0
Brockport		–		5	–	5	–	0
Buffalo		–		5	–	5	–	0
Buffalo State		–		3	–	3	–	0
Fordham		–		5	–	5	–	0
Iona		–		5	–	5	–	0
Mercyhurst		–		4	–	2	–	1
Rochester (NY)		–		4	–	4	–	1
Union (NY)		–		4	–	4	–	1
Colorado College		–		4	–	5	–	0
Duquesne		–		4	–	5	–	0
Frostburg State		–		4	–	5	–	0
Canisius		–		4	–	6	–	0
Hofstra		–		4	–	6	–	0
UCF		–		4	–	6	–	0
Saint Francis (PA)		–		3	–	6	–	1
Norwich		–		3	–	7	–	0
Grove City		–		2	–	7	–	0
Salisbury State		–		2	–	7	–	0
St. Norbert		–		2	–	7	–	0
Catholic University		–		1	–	8	–	0
Merchant Marine		–		1	–	9	–	0
^ – NCAA Division III playoff participant

The 1981 UCF Knights football season represented the University of Central Florida (UCF) as an independent during the 1981 NCAA Division III football season. Led by Don Jonas in this third and final season as head coach, the Knights compiled a record of 4–6. UCF played their home games at Orlando Stadium in downtown Orlando, Florida. This was the final season that team competed at the NCAA Division III level as they moved to NCAA Division II competition in 1982.

== Schedule ==
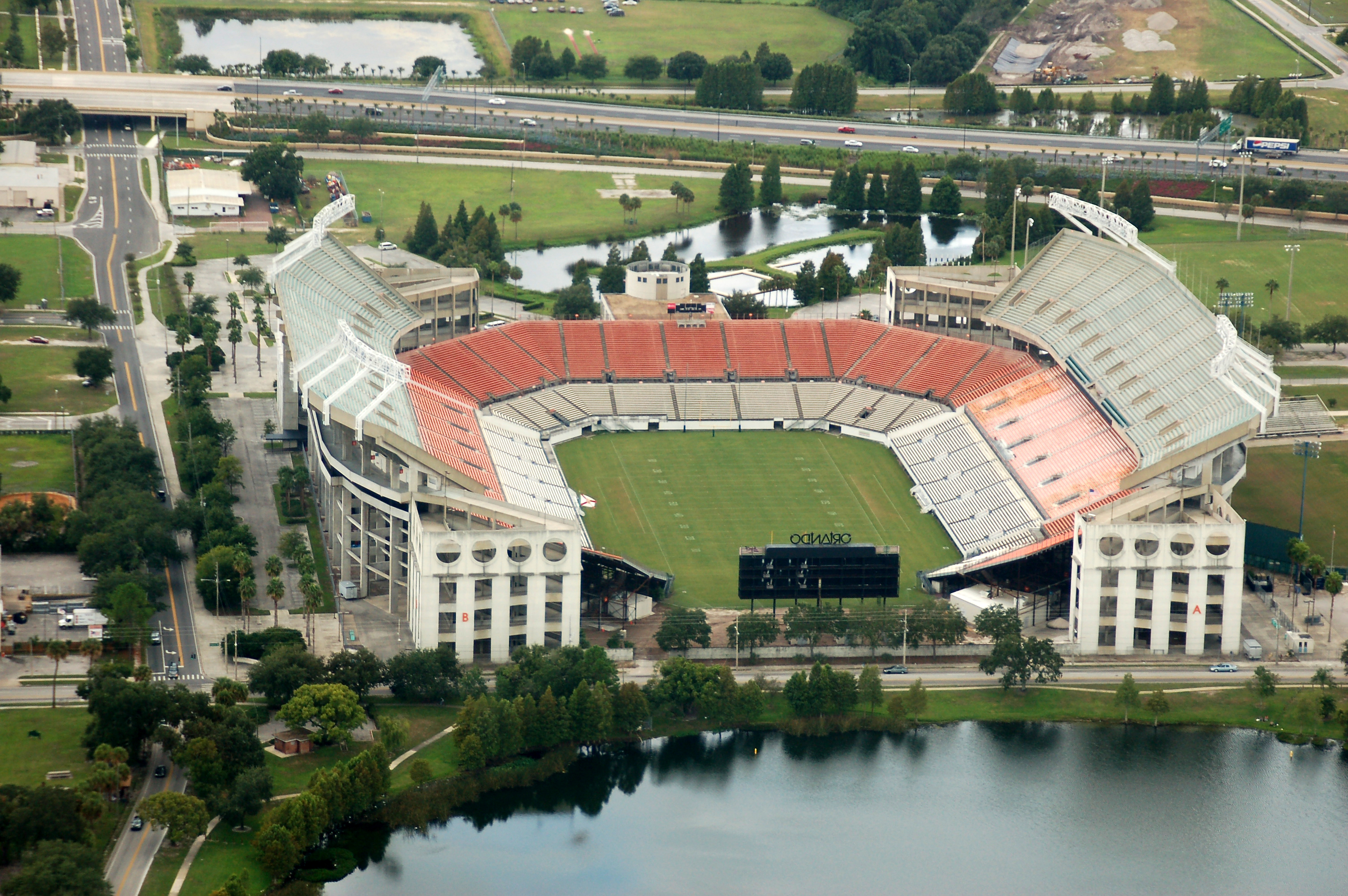
Orlando Stadium, the Knights' home field

Date	Opponent	Site	Result	Attendance	Source
September 12	Presbyterian	Orlando Stadium; Orlando, FL	L 0–3	8,347	
September 19	Elizabeth City State	Orlando Stadium; Orlando, FL	L 9–14	4,833	
September 26	at Millsaps	Harper Davis Field; Jackson, MS	W 13–6	800	
October 3	Miles	Orlando Stadium; Orlando, FL	W 6–0	6,320	
October 10	Savannah State	Orlando Stadium; Orlando, FL	W 47–13	6,493	
October 17	at Alabama A&M	Normal, AL	L 15–23	8,700	
October 31	at West Georgia	Grisham Stadium; Carrollton, GA	L 6–20	6,200	
November 7	Hampden–Sydney	Orlando Stadium; Orlando, FL	W 17–0	8,391	
November 14	Millersville	Orlando Stadium; Orlando, FL	L 9–27	4,365	
November 21	Bethune–Cookman	Orlando Stadium; Orlando, FL	L 20–24	8,354	
