= Bernard Ford (American football) =

American football player (born 1966)

No. 80, 88
- Position: Wide receiver

Personal information
- Born: February 27, 1966 (age 60); Cordele, Georgia, U.S.
- Listed height: 5 ft 9 in (1.75 m)
- Listed weight: 168 lb (76 kg)

Career information
- High school: Crisp County (Cordele)
- College: UCF
- NFL draft: 1988: 3rd round, 65th overall pick

Career history
- Buffalo Bills (1988); Dallas Cowboys (1989); Houston Oilers (1990); London Monarchs (1992); Green Bay Packers (1992)*; Miami Dolphins (1993)*; Philadelphia Eagles (1995)*
- * Offseason or practice squad member only

Awards and highlights
- Second-team Little All-American (1987)

Career NFL statistics
- Receptions: 17
- Receiving yards: 176
- Touchdowns: 2
- Stats at Pro Football Reference

Bernard Ford (born February 27, 1966) is an American former professional football player who was a wide receiver in the National Football League (NFL) for the Dallas Cowboys and Houston Oilers. He also was a member of the London Monarchs in the World League of American Football (WLAF). He played college football for the UCF Knights. In 2011 he was inducted into the University of Central Florida Knights Hall of Fame.

== Early life ==
Ford attended Crisp County High School, where although he was an All-state selection in track and an MVP in football. He didn't receive many scholarship offers because he was considered small to play college football.

He moved on to Marion Military Institute and transferred at the end of his freshman year to the University of Central Florida. As a sophomore, he tallied 13 receptions for 305 receiving yards. The next year, he registered 30 receptions for 653 yards and 8 touchdowns.

As a senior, including playoffs, he posted a then school record 82 receptions for 1,403 yards with 13 touchdowns. He also contributed to his team earning a 9-4 record and a trip to the national semifinals of the NCAA Division II playoffs. Against Northwest Missouri State University, he had 11 receptions for a school-record 208 yards and 4 touchdowns.

Ford finished his college career with school records for career receptions (111), career receiving yards (2,138), career touchdown receptions (21), career reception average (19.3), single-season reception average (21.8), career 100-yard receiving games (5), single-season receiving yards (1,403), single-season receptions (68), single-game receptions (14), single-game receiving yards (208 yards) and single-game receiving touchdowns (4).

In 2011, he was inducted into the University of Central Florida Athletics Hall of Fame.

== Professional career ==
=== Buffalo Bills ===
Ford was selected by the Buffalo Bills in the third round (65th pick overall) of the 1988 NFL draft, after having a standout performance at the NFL Scouting Combine. He separated his shoulder during preseason and was placed on the injured reserve list, where he remained for the entire season. He was waived on September 4, 1989.

=== Dallas Cowboys ===
On September 6, 1989, Ford was signed by the Dallas Cowboys to the practice squad. In October, he was promoted to the active roster and appeared in 10 games (one start), posting 7 receptions for 78 yards and one touchdown.

=== Houston Oilers ===
In 1990, the Houston Oilers signed Ford as a Plan B free agent to play in their run and shoot offense and return kickoffs. He appeared as a backup in 14 games, recording 10 receptions for 98 yards, one touchdown and 14 kickoff returns for 219 yards. He wasn't re-signed at the end of the season.

=== London Monarchs ===
On February 4, 1992, he was selected by the defending champions the London Monarchs, in the second round of the WLAF Draft. He was a starter at wide receiver, registering 45 receptions for 833 yards and 6 touchdowns.

=== Green Bay Packers ===
On June 11, 1992, he signed with the Green Bay Packers. He was released on August 24.

=== Miami Dolphins ===
On March 3, 1993, he was signed by the Miami Dolphins. He was cut on July 30.

=== Philadelphia Eagles ===
In 1995, he was signed by the Philadelphia Eagles. He was waived on July 31.
