= Joe Burnett =

American football player (born 1986)

No. 27, 17
- Positions: Cornerback, Return specialist

Personal information
- Born: November 28, 1986 (age 39); Eustis, Florida, U.S.
- Listed height: 5 ft 11 in (1.80 m)
- Listed weight: 185 lb (84 kg)

Career information
- High school: Eustis
- College: UCF
- NFL draft: 2009: 5th round, 168th overall pick

Career history
- Pittsburgh Steelers (2009); New York Giants (2011)*; Jacksonville Sharks (2011); Edmonton Eskimos (2011–2014); Calgary Stampeders (2015–2017); Montreal Alouettes (2018)
- * Offseason or practice squad member only

Awards and highlights
- CFL All-Star (2012); CFL West All-Star (2012); First-team All-American (2008); C-USA Special Teams Player of the Year (2008); 4× First-team All-C-USA (2005–2008); UCF Knights No. 19 honored; Edmonton Elks record: Longest interception return: 108 yards

Career CFL statistics
- Total tackles: 197
- Sacks: 2
- Interceptions: 13
- Forced fumbles: 3
- Defensive touchdowns: 4
- Stats at Pro Football Reference
- Stats at CFL.ca

Joe Burnett (born November 28, 1986) is an American former professional football player who was a cornerback in the National Football League (NFL) and Canadian Football League (CFL). He played college football for the UCF Knights and high school football at Eustis High School in Eustis. Burnett played for the Pittsburgh Steelers, Edmonton Eskimos, Calgary Stampeders, and Montreal Alouettes.

== College career ==
Burnett is a record setting cornerback and returner for the University of Central Florida who was named a first-team All-American as a senior in 2008.

He helped UCF to its first two bowl berths (2005 Sheraton Hawaii Bowl, 2007 AutoZone Liberty Bowl) and the school's first ever conference championship in 2007.

He earned a total of eight career All-Conference USA honors, including a four-year sweep of the first-team punt returner award.

He was named Conference USA Special Teams Player of the Year as a senior.

He graduated in 19th place for most career punt return yards in NCAA history with 1,304. That sum is both a UCF and Conference USA record.

He set the UCF record, and ranked second in C-USA history with 16 career interceptions. He also set UCF career records for most punt returns (96) and the most interception return yards (262) while tying the mark for most punt return touchdowns (3).

He played in 49 career games with 46 starts. He amassed 221 career tackles (172) including 12 TFLs. He had 16 career interceptions and broke up 35 others. He also returned 96 punts for 1,304 yards (13.6 avg.) with three touchdowns and returned 26 kickoffs for 745 yards (28.7 avg.) and a pair of scored.

He received his bachelor's degree in Criminal Justice in December, 2008.

=== Awards and honors ===
- First-team ESPN All-American (2008)
- First-team Sports Illustrated All-American (2008)
- First-team Conference USA All-Freshman (2005)
- 4x First-team All-Conference USA (2005–2008)
- First-team CollegeFootballNews.com Freshman All-American (2005)
- First-team FWAA Freshman All-American (2005)
- First-team Rivals.com Freshman All-American (2005)
- Third-team Sporting News Freshman All-America

== Professional career ==
=== Pittsburgh Steelers ===
Joe was selected by the Steelers with the 32nd pick of the fifth round (168th overall). There was speculation that he would share duties in returning punts and kick returns, but the emergence of Stefan Logan as a return specialist denied him this role. Still, Burnett was able to earn a spot on the 53-man roster due to his stellar defensive play. His final preseason statistics included 15 tackles, 4 passes defended, 1 interception, and a blocked field goal.

Burnett was released by the Steelers on September 3, 2010, in order for the Steelers to meet the 53 man roster requirement.

=== New York Giants ===
On January 5, 2011, Burnett signed a reserve/future contract with the New York Giants.

=== Jacksonville Sharks ===
Burnett signed a deal with the Jacksonville Sharks hoping to play in their 2012 season

=== Edmonton Eskimos ===
Joe Burnett signed a practice roster contract with the Edmonton Eskimos of the Canadian Football League. In his first season in the CFL Burnett lead all players with 6 interceptions. On July 10 Burnett set an Eskimos record for longest interception return when he picked off Travis Lulay of the BC Lions and returned it 108 yards for the touchdown. He also scored a touchdown on a 44-yard fumble recovery on August 10, 2012. On defense, he recorded 47 tackles and on special teams he added 3 more tackles. Burnett also played a significant role on punt/kick return. He amassed 573 kick-off return yards on 28 returns and 440 yards on 52 punt returns.

In his second season in the CFL Burnett increased his defensive tackles from 47 to 57, but only managed to get 1 pass interception. He once again participated in kick and punt return duties, although to a lesser extent. In the off-season the Eskimos signed Burnett to a contract extension through the 2015 CFL season. In 2014 Burnett played in only a handful of games because of nagging leg injuries, totaling 18 tackles and 1 interception. He was released by the Eskimos in April 2015.

=== Calgary Stampeders ===
On April 13, 2015, Burnett agreed to terms with the Calgary Stampeders of the Canadian Football League.

=== Montreal Alouettes ===
Burnett spent the 2018 season with the Montreal Alouettes. Burnett was released by Montreal in January 2019.
