= Ted Wilson (American football) =

American football player (born 1964)

No. 80, 89
- Position: Wide receiver

Personal information
- Born: July 14, 1964 (age 62); Zephyrhills, Florida, U.S.
- Listed height: 5 ft 9 in (1.75 m)
- Listed weight: 170 lb (77 kg)

Career information
- High school: Zephyrhills (FL)
- College: UCF
- NFL draft: 1987: 10th round, 274th overall pick

Career history
- Washington Redskins (1987); Tampa Bay Buccaneers (1988)*; Green Bay Packers (1988)*; Washington Redskins (1988)*; Cleveland Browns (1989)*; Birmingham Fire (1991)
- * Offseason or practice squad member only

Career NFL statistics
- Receptions: 5
- Receiving yards: 112
- Total touchdowns: 2
- Stats at Pro Football Reference

John Wesley "Ted" Wilson (born July 14, 1964) is an American former professional football player who was a wide receiver in the National Football League (NFL) for the Washington Redskins. He played college football at the University of Central Florida, and was selected by the Redskins in the 10th round of the 1987 NFL draft.

== Early life ==
Wilson was born in Zephyrhills, Florida and attended Zephyrhills High School, where he played high school football and baseball. During his senior year, Wilson batted .400 with 10 home runs and 50 stolen bases. Wilson was drafted by the New York Mets but decided to attend college.

== College career ==
Wilson attended and played college football at the University of Central Florida. As a freshman return specialist in 1983, he finished second in the nation with a 30.5 kick return average, including a national-high 100-yard touchdown return against Southeastern Louisiana University. During his sophomore season, Wilson led the team in receiving (483 yards), scoring (44 points), punt returns (96 yards) and kickoff returns (952 yards). In 1985, he set a school record with seven 100-yard games, which included five consecutive 100-yard games. He finished the season with 76 receptions for 1,119 yards and 12 touchdowns. He finished his college career with 151 receptions for 2,443 yards, 21 touchdowns, and 4,854 all-purpose yards, which is still a school record. In 2003, Wilson was named to UCF's 25th Anniversary Football Team.

== Professional career ==
Wilson became the first UCF Knights football player to be selected by an NFL team when he was selected the 10th round (274th overall) of the 1987 NFL draft by the Washington Redskins. The 1987 season began with a 24-day players' strike, reducing the 16-game season to 15. The games for weeks 4–6 were won with all replacement players, including Wilson. The Redskins have the distinction of being the only team with no players crossing the picket line. Those three victories are often credited with getting the team into the playoffs and the basis for the 2000 movie The Replacements.

== Prison sentence ==
Wilson was arrested on December 19, 2011, after investigators raided his house and found a quarter-kilogram of cocaine, more than an ounce of crack cocaine, a loaded shotgun and a Hi-Point CF-380 semiautomatic handgun. According to court documents, in 2009 to 2012, he worked with others in Pasco County, Florida to distribute large quantities of cocaine and crack cocaine. During the height of his drug trafficking operations, Wilson distributed approximately 100 kilograms of cocaine per month, and profited over $1 million. He pleaded guilty on January 18, 2013 to drug and weapons charges. On May 1, 2013, Wilson was sentenced to 17 years in federal prison, which included 12 years' imprisonment for three drug-related charges, followed by a mandatory consecutive five years for possessing a firearm.
