= 1979 UCF Knights football team =

American college football season

1979 UCF Knights football
- Conference: Independent
- Record: 6–2 (Note: The official NCAA Statistics do not include the game against Fort Benning, resulting in a record of 5–2)
- Head coach: Don Jonas (1st season)
- Home stadium: Florida Citrus Bowl Stadium

1979 NCAA Division III independents football records
	Conf.			Overall
Team	W	L	T	W		L		T
Wabash		–		8	–	1	–	0
Norwich		–		8	–	2	–	0
Maryville (TN)		–		7	–	2	–	0
Dayton		–		8	–	2	–	1
UCF		–		6	–	2	–	0
Millsaps		–		7	–	3	–	0
Albany		–		6	–	3	–	0
Catholic University		–		6	–	3	–	0
Salisbury State		–		6	–	3	–	0
Georgetown		–		5	–	3	–	0
Hofstra		–		5	–	3	–	1
Frostburg State		–		6	–	4	–	0
Saint Mary's		–		6	–	4	–	0
Brockport		–		5	–	4	–	0
Canisius		–		5	–	4	–	0
Duquesne		–		5	–	4	–	0
Rochester (NY)		–		5	–	4	–	0
Wagner		–		5	–	5	–	0
San Diego		–		5	–	6	–	0
Buffalo		–		4	–	5	–	0
Colorado College		–		4	–	5	–	0
Union (NY)		–		3	–	5	–	0
WPI		–		3	–	5	–	0
Grove City		–		3	–	6	–	0
Saint Francis (PA)		–		2	–	6	–	0
DePauw		–		2	–	7	–	0
Merchant Marine		–		1	–	9	–	1
Cortland		–		1	–	9	–	0
St. Norbert		–		1	–	9	–	0
Fordham		–		0	–	9	–	0

The 1979 UCF Knights football team represented the University of Central Florida (UCF) as an independent during the 1979 NCAA Division III football season. This was first varsity football team fielded by UCF. The Knights were led by head coach Don Jonas and played their home games at the Florida Citrus Bowl Stadium, now known as Camping World Stadium in downtown Orlando.

UCF played its first football game on Saturday September 22, at Saint Leo. The game took place on a rainy, water-logged and muddy field, which was a said to be a cow pasture. Quarterback Mike Cullison, a graduate of nearby Evans High School, threw two touchdown passes and ran for another touchdown, as UCF was victorious by the score of 21–0. Running back Mike Stapp rushed for 101 yards on 15 carries, and the Knights defense held the Lions to only 92 yards of total offense.

One week later, the Knights won their first home game by defeating Fort Benning, 7–6. Jonas led the Knights to a 6–2 inaugural season, behind an average attendance of 11,240, including an NCAA Division III record crowd of 14,138 for the game against Fort Benning.

The humble beginnings for the Knights football team were exemplified during their inaugural season. The team had no locker room, the coaching staff was composed of volunteers, players were asked to bring their own cleats, and all equipment and supplies were donated. Practices took place on a driving range, and players had to go to a classroom building on campus to find showers. Jonas famously offered to take the head coaching position for no salary.

== Schedule ==
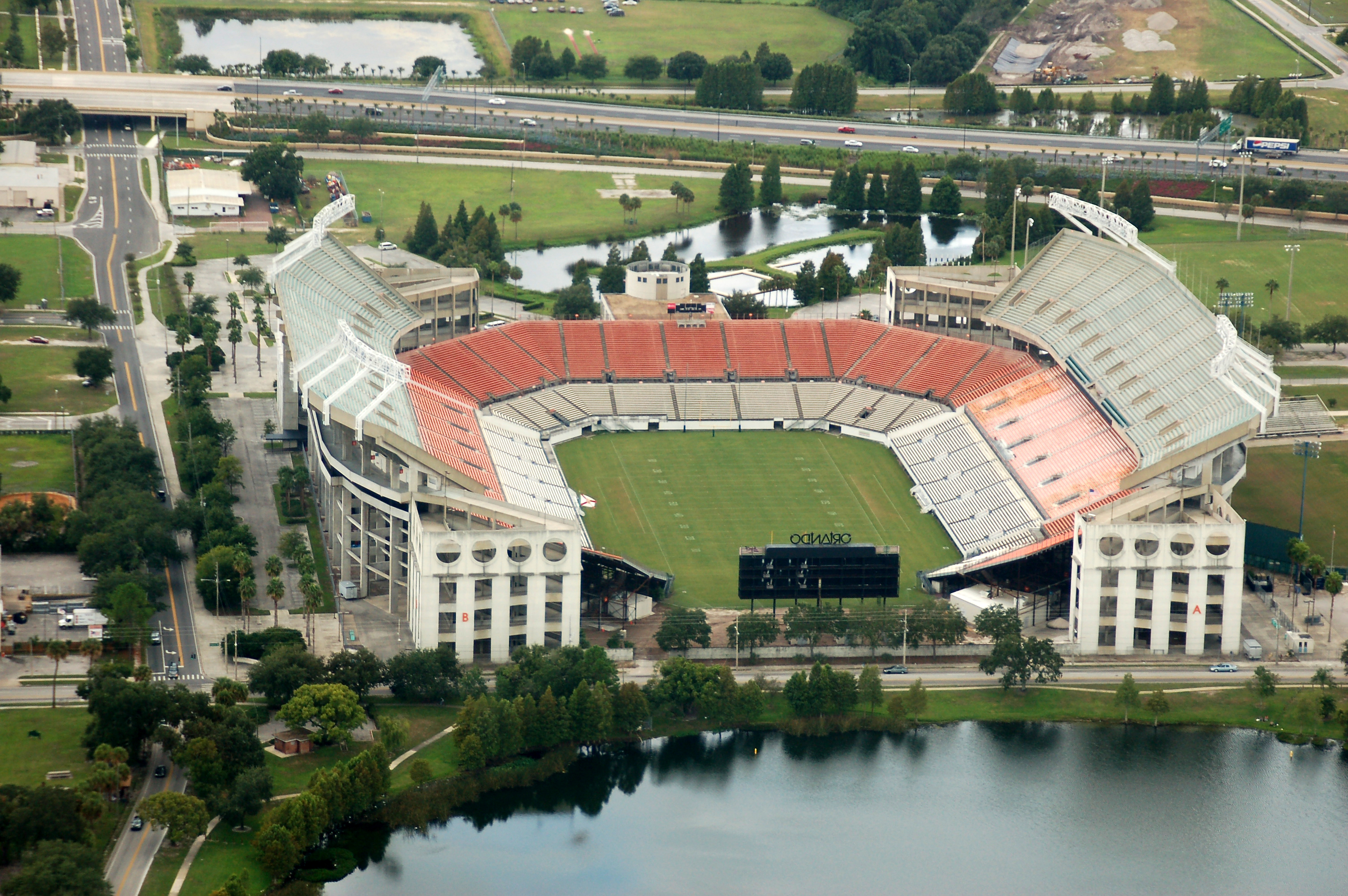
Orlando Stadium, later known as the Florida Citrus Bowl, the Knights' home field from 1979 to 2006

Date	Opponent	Site	Result	Attendance
September 22	at Saint Leo	St. Leo, FL	W 21–0	1,000
September 29	Fort Benning	Florida Citrus Bowl Stadium; Orlando, FL	W 7–6	14,138
October 13	Maryville (TN)	Florida Citrus Bowl Stadium; Orlando, FL	W 10–7	7,350
October 20	at Fort Lauderdale	Fort Lauderdale, FL	W 14–0	500
October 27	at Presbyterian	Bailey Stadium; Clinton, SC	L 0–48	3,800
November 3	at Emory and Henry	Emory, VA	L 14–28	1,000
November 10	Sewanee	Florida Citrus Bowl; Orlando, FL	W 24–0	10,111
November 17	Morehouse	Florida Citrus Bowl; Orlando, FL	W 14–7	13,309
