= 1989 UCF Knights football team =

American college football season

1989 UCF Knights football
- Conference: Independent
- Record: 7–3
- Head coach: Gene McDowell (5th season)
- Offensive coordinator: Mike Kruczek (5th season)
- Defensive coordinator: Rusty Russell (1st season)
- Home stadium: Florida Citrus Bowl

1989 NCAA Division II independents football records
	Conf.			Overall
Team	W	L	T	W		L		T
No. T–12 New Haven		–		8	–	2	–	0
No. 19 American International		–		7	–	3	–	0
UCF		–		7	–	3	–	0
Saint Mary's		–		6	–	4	–	0
Wofford		–		6	–	5	–	0
Central Connecticut		–		5	–	5	–	0
Springfield		–		4	–	6	–	0
Southern Connecticut State		–		3	–	7	–	0
Michigan Tech		–		2	–	7	–	0
Kentucky State		–		2	–	9	–	0
Rankings from NCAA Division II Football Committee poll

The 1989 UCF Knights football season was the eleventh for the team. It was Gene McDowell's fifth season as the head coach of the Knights. The season marked UCF's last in Division II, as the Knight would move to Division I-AA in 1990. The team posted an overall record of 7–3 in 1989 but failed to make the Division II Playoffs.

As a Division II team in 1989, UCF defeated multiple Division I-AA teams, including two nationally ranked schools. On October 28, UCF upset No. 9 Liberty (I-AA), and two weeks later on November 11, defeated No. 4 Eastern Kentucky (I-AA). Against Eastern Kentucky, quarterback Rudy Jones led a fourth quarter comeback, throwing two touchdown passes to lift the Knights to a 20–19 victory.

The team played their home games at the Citrus Bowl in Downtown Orlando. During the decade of the 1980s, the Knights compiled an overall record of 47–59–1 (.443)

== Schedule ==
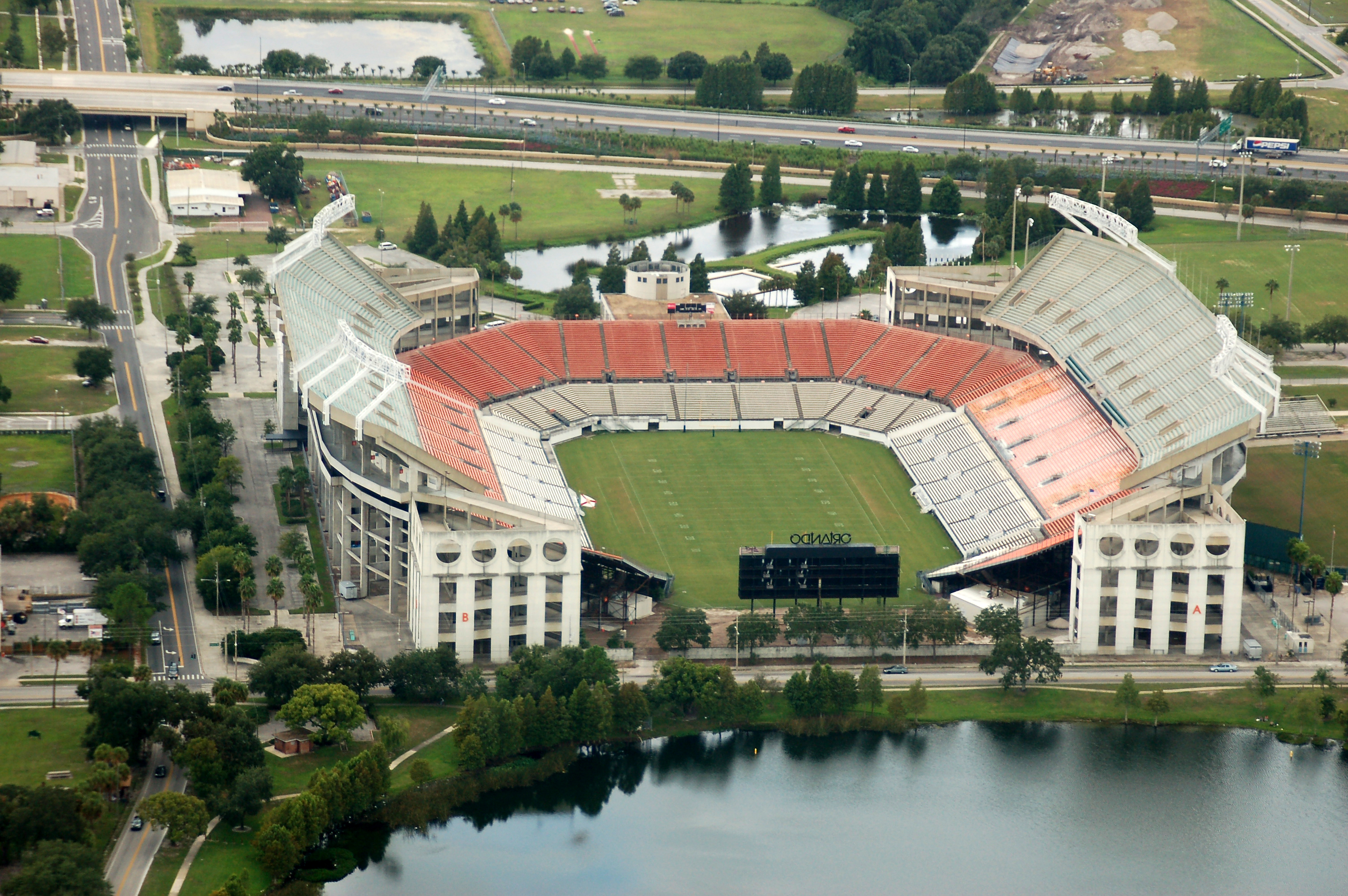
The Florida Citrus Bowl, the Knights' home field

Date	Opponent	Site	Result	Attendance	Source
September 1	Bethune–Cookman	Florida Citrus Bowl; Orlando, FL	L 15–23	23,620	
September 9	Valdosta State	Florida Citrus Bowl; Orlando, FL	W 35–14	18,046	
September 16	at Troy State	Veterans Memorial Stadium; Troy, AL	L 6–20	8,000	
September 23	Newberry	Florida Citrus Bowl; Orlando, FL	W 30–3	8,316	
September 30	at North Alabama	Braly Municipal Stadium; Florence, AL	W 17–16	5,500	
October 7	East Tennessee State	Florida Citrus Bowl; Orlando, FL	W 34–0	12,072	
October 21	at No. 2 Georgia Southern	Paulson Stadium; Statesboro, GA	L 17–31	19,640	
October 28	No. T–9 Liberty	Florida Citrus Bowl; Orlando, FL	W 33–30	15,095	
November 11	No. 4 Eastern Kentucky	Florida Citrus Bowl; Orlando, FL	W 20–19	17,506	
November 18	Texas Southern	Florida Citrus Bowl; Orlando, FL	W 49–12	14,082	
Rankings from NCAA Division I-AA Football Committee Poll released prior to the game
