= Doug Gabriel =

American football player (born 1980)

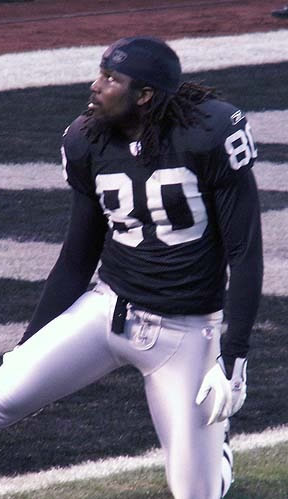
- Gabriel with the Oakland Raiders

No. 85, 80, 10
- Position: Wide receiver

Personal information
- Born: August 27, 1980 (age 46); Miami, Florida, U.S.
- Listed height: 6 ft 3 in (1.91 m)
- Listed weight: 215 lb (98 kg)

Career information
- High school: Dr. Phillips (Orlando, Florida)
- College: UCF
- NFL draft: 2003: 5th round, 167th overall pick

Career history
- Oakland Raiders (2003–2005); New England Patriots (2006); Oakland Raiders (2006); Cincinnati Bengals (2008)*; Florida Tuskers (2009)*; California Redwoods (2009); Sacramento Mountain Lions (2010)*; Orlando Predators (2011)
- * Offseason or practice squad member only

Awards and highlights
- Second-team All-MAC (2002)

Career NFL statistics
- Receptions: 101
- Receiving yards: 1,550
- Receiving touchdowns: 8
- Stats at Pro Football Reference

Career AFL statistics
- Receptions: 12
- Receiving yards: 104
- Receiving touchdowns: 2
- Stats at ArenaFan.com

Douglas Gabriel (born August 27, 1980) is an American former professional football player who was a wide receiver in the National Football League (NFL). He was selected by the Oakland Raiders in the fifth round of the 2003 NFL draft. He played college football for the UCF Knights.

Gabriel was also a member of the New England Patriots, Cincinnati Bengals, Florida Tuskers, California Redwoods, Sacramento Mountain Lions and Orlando Predators.

== Early life ==
Gabriel attended Dr. Phillips High School in Orlando, Florida, and was a letterman in football. As a senior, he won All-Conference and All-State honors as a wide receiver.

== College career ==
Gabriel finalized his storied high school career but was academically unable to enroll at Miami (Fla.) or Oregon State or any large school where he was recruited. He enrolled at Mississippi Gulf Coast Community College (MGCCC) in Perkinston, MS where he had a breakout 2000 fall season and made passing grades in the classroom, refocusing on playing at a larger university. Gabriel signed with and attended the University of Central Florida and was a two-year letterman in football. He finished his stellar college football career with 97 receptions for 1,869 yards and 20 touchdowns and added 795 yards on 37 kickoff returns (21.5 avg.). His 1,869 receiving yards rank ninth on the school's career-record list while his 20 receiving touchdowns rank fifth.

== Professional career ==
Pre-draft measurables
Height	Weight	Arm length	Hand span	40-yard dash	10-yard split	20-yard split	20-yard shuttle	Three-cone drill	Vertical jump	Broad jump
6 ft 2 in (1.88 m)	213 lb (97 kg)	32 1/2 in (0.83 m)	9 7/8 in (0.25 m)	4.54 s	1.62 s	2.70 s	4.16 s	7.05 s	35 1/2 in (0.90 m)	9 ft 8 in (2.95 m)
All values from NFL Combine.

=== Oakland Raiders (first stint) ===
Gabriel was selected by the Raiders in the fifth-round (167th overall) of the 2003 NFL draft.

=== New England Patriots ===
On September 2, 2006, Gabriel was traded to the New England Patriots for a fifth round pick in the 2007 NFL draft. In 2006, Gabriel appeared in 12 games (five starts) for the Patriots and caught 25 passes for 344 yards and three touchdowns. He was waived by the team on December 12, 2006.

=== Oakland Raiders (second stint) ===
A day after being released by the Patriots, Gabriel re-signed with the Raiders on December 13, 2006. Gabriel appeared in three games for the team that season, catching five passes for 84 yards. On August 27, 2007, the Raiders released him.

=== Cincinnati Bengals ===
After spending the 2007 season out of football, Gabriel signed with the Cincinnati Bengals on April 8, 2008. He was released by the team on May 29, 2008.

=== Florida Tuskers ===
Gabriel was signed by the Florida Tuskers of the United Football League (UFL) on August 25, 2009. He was released by the Tuskers prior to the team's first game.

=== California Redwoods ===
Gabriel then signed on with another UFL team, the California Redwoods, on October 12, 2009. He played in five games, starting one, for the Redwoods in 2009.

=== Sacramento Mountain Lions ===
Gabriel signed with the Sacramento Mountain Lions for the 2010 UFL season but did not play in any games for the team.

=== Orlando Predators ===
Gabriel was assigned to the Orlando Predators of the Arena Football League on January 18, 2011. He caught 12 passes for 104 yards and two touchdowns in 2011. He was placed on injured reserve on June 2, 2011.

== Post-playing career ==
Gabriel became offensive coordinator at East River High School (Fla.) HS in 2013, then became head football coach in September 2014 on an interim basis after the previous head coach resigned under pressure. In August 2015, Gabriel denied a rumor that he was leaving East River to take an internship with the Oakland Raiders.

== See also ==
- List of NCAA major college football yearly receiving leaders
