= 1987 UCF Knights football team =

American college football season

1987 UCF Knights football

NCAA Division II Semifinal, L 10–31 vs. Troy State
- Conference: Independent
- Record: 9–4
- Head coach: Gene McDowell (3rd season)
- Offensive coordinator: Mike Kruczek (3rd season)
- Defensive coordinator: Bruce Bennett (2nd season)
- Home stadium: Florida Citrus Bowl

1987 NCAA Division II independents football records
	Conf.			Overall
Team	W	L	T	W		L		T
No. 16 New Haven		–		8	–	2	–	0
Saint Mary's		–		8	–	3	–	0
No. 11 UCF ^		–		9	–	4	–	0
Springfield		–		5	–	3	–	1
Central Connecticut		–		4	–	4	–	1
American International		–		3	–	5	–	2
Liberty		–		3	–	7	–	0
Kentucky State		–		2	–	8	–	1
Michigan Tech		–		2	–	7	–	0
Southern Connecticut State		–		1	–	9	–	0
^ – NCAA Division II playoff participant; Rankings from NCAA Division II Football Committee poll

The 1987 UCF Knights football season was the ninth for the team. It was the third season for Gene McDowell as the head coach of the Knights. After posting an 8–3 regular season record in 1987, the Knights earned their first trip to the Division II playoffs, where they earned a 1–1 record, falling in the Semifinals.

The Knights competed as an NCAA Division II Independent. The team played their home games at the Citrus Bowl in Downtown Orlando. The Knights finished undefeated (7–0) against Division II opponents during the regular season. Their only losses during the regular season came to Division I-AA opponents, two of which were I-AA playoff teams. The Knights strength of schedule (the toughest in Division II), helped qualify them for the playoff bracket.

== Schedule ==
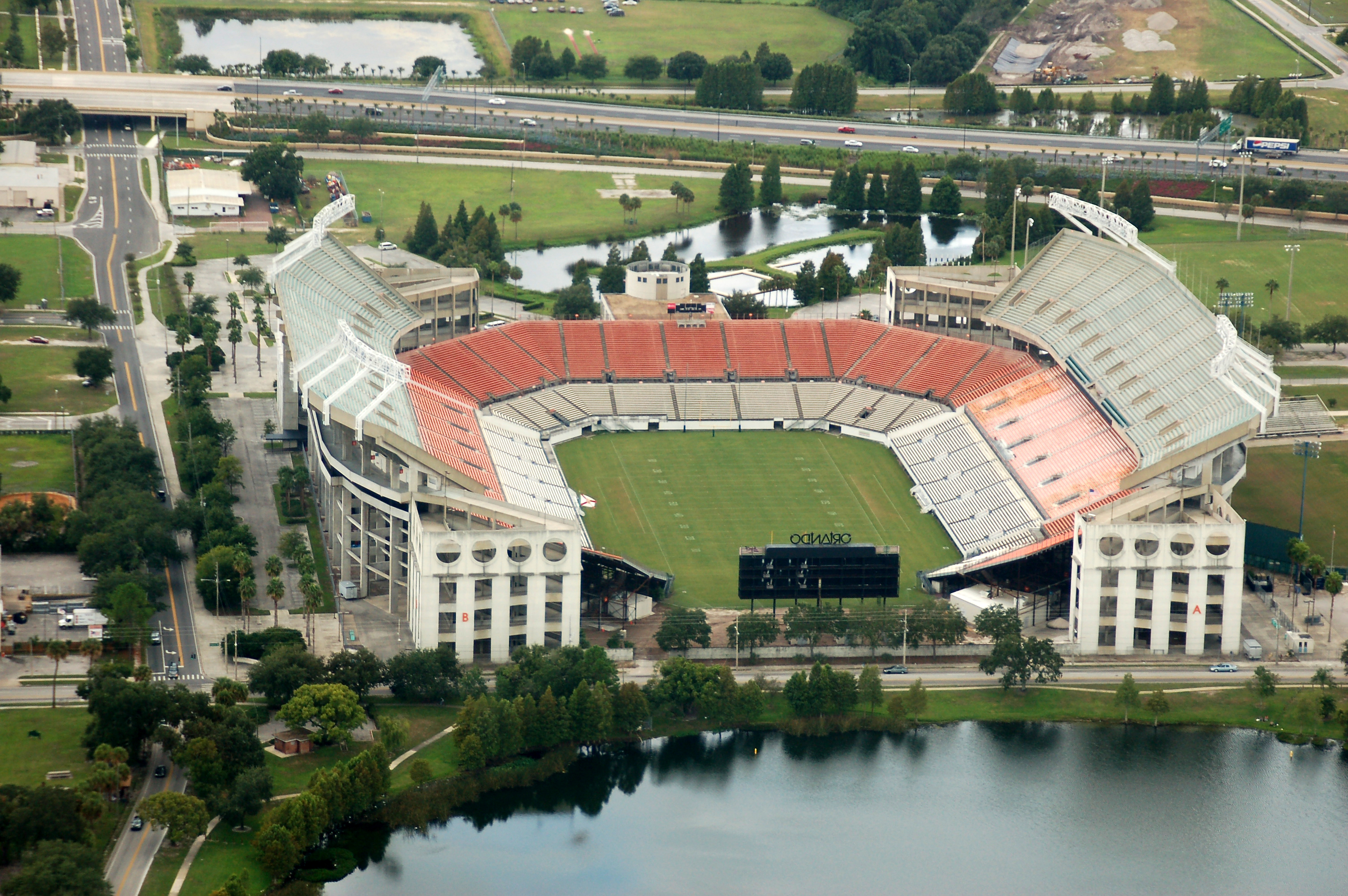
The Florida Citrus Bowl, the Knights' home field

Date	Opponent	Rank	Site	Result	Attendance	Source
September 5	Bethune–Cookman	No. 10	Florida Citrus Bowl; Orlando, FL	W 17–9	9,768	
September 19	Elon	No. 5	Florida Citrus Bowl; Orlando, FL	W 34–10	11,752	
September 26	Eastern Kentucky	No. 2	Florida Citrus Bowl; Orlando, FL	L 16–23	15,197	
October 3	at No. 13 (I-AA) Georgia Southern	No. 8	Paulson Stadium; Statesboro, GA	L 32–34	15,540	
October 10	Savannah State		Florida Citrus Bowl; Orlando, FL	W 36–26	10,743	
October 17	West Georgia	No. 17	Florida Citrus Bowl; Orlando, FL	W 52–14	10,029	
October 24	Northwest Missouri State	No. 13	Florida Citrus Bowl; Orlando, FL	W 45–3	15,208	
October 31	Grand Valley State	No. 11	Florida Citrus Bowl; Orlando, FL	W 67–3	7,552	
November 7	Liberty	No. 7	Florida Citrus Bowl; Orlando, FL	W 42–21	11,081	
November 14	at Florida A&M	No. 5	Bragg Memorial Stadium; Tallahassee, FL	L 14–19	4,803	
November 21	Morningside	No. 11	Florida Citrus Bowl; Orlando, FL	W 24–7	10,112	
November 28	No. 6 IUP	No. 11	Florida Citrus Bowl; Orlando, FL (NCAA Division II First Round)	W 12–10	15,043	
December 5	No. 4 Troy State	No. 11	Florida Citrus Bowl; Orlando, FL (NCAA Division II Semifinal)	L 10–31	14,327	
Rankings from NCAA Division II Football Committee Poll released prior to the game
