= Charles Lee (American football) =

American football player (born 1977)

No. 82, 81
- Position: Wide receiver

Personal information
- Born: November 19, 1977 (age 48); Miami, Florida, U.S.
- Listed height: 6 ft 3 in (1.91 m)
- Listed weight: 227 lb (103 kg)

Career information
- High school: Homestead (FL)
- College: UCF
- NFL draft: 2000: 7th round, 242nd overall pick

Career history
- Green Bay Packers (2000–2001); Tampa Bay Buccaneers (2002–2004); Arizona Cardinals (2005); Orlando Predators (2007)

Awards and highlights
- Super Bowl champion (XXXVII)

Career NFL statistics
- Receptions: 72
- Receiving yards: 957
- Touchdowns: 3
- Stats at Pro Football Reference

Career AFL statistics
- Receptions: 10
- Receiving yards: 113
- Touchdowns: 1
- Stats at ArenaFan.com

Charles Lee (born November 19, 1977) is an American former professional football player who was a wide receiver for the Green Bay Packers, Tampa Bay Buccaneers and Arizona Cardinals of the National Football League (NFL). He played college football for the UCF Knights and was selected by the Packers in the seventh round of the 2000 NFL draft. Lee was a member of the Buccaneers' 2003 Super Bowl winning team. He also played for the Orlando Predators of the Arena Football League in 2007.

Already on probation for cocaine possession, he was arrested on December 5, 2007, for robbing two students near the University of Central Florida, the college where he formerly starred. He was sentenced to five years in prison, and later he planned to work on a prison ministry when released. Lee is a member of Kappa Alpha Psi fraternity.

== NFL career statistics ==
Legend
**Bold**	Career high

Year	Team	Games		Receiving					
Year	Team	GP	GS	Tgt	Rec	Yds	Avg	Lng	TD
2000	GNB	**15**	1	21	10	134	13.4	38	0
2001	GNB	7	0	4	3	32	10.7	23	1
2002	TAM	1	0	0	0	0	0.0	0	0
2003	TAM	8	**5**	**46**	**33**	**432**	13.1	**72**	**2**
2004	TAM	7	3	22	15	207	**13.8**	35	0
2005	ARI	6	0	18	11	152	**13.8**	49	0
Career		44	9	111	72	957	13.3	72	3
