= Mike Sims-Walker =

American gridiron football player (born 1984)

No. 81, 11, 10, 15
- Position: Wide receiver

Personal information
- Born: November 21, 1984 (age 41); Orlando, Florida, U.S.
- Listed height: 6 ft 2 in (1.88 m)
- Listed weight: 214 lb (97 kg)

Career information
- High school: Edgewater (Orlando)
- College: UCF (2003–2006)
- NFL draft: 2007: 3rd round, 79th overall pick

Career history
- Jacksonville Jaguars (2007–2010); St. Louis Rams (2011); Jacksonville Jaguars (2011); Winnipeg Blue Bombers (2013)

Awards and highlights
- First-team All-Conference USA (2006); Second-team All-Conference USA (2005)

Career NFL statistics
- Receptions: 134
- Receiving yards: 1,798
- Receiving touchdowns: 14
- Stats at Pro Football Reference

Career CFL statistics
- Receptions: 8
- Receiving yards: 137
- Stats at CFL.ca (archived)

Michael Anthony Sims-Walker (born Michael Anthony Walker on November 21, 1984) is an American former professional football player who was a wide receiver in the National Football League (NFL). He played college football for the UCF Knights and was selected by the Jacksonville Jaguars in the third round of the 2007 NFL draft.

Sims-Walker also played in the NFL for the St. Louis Rams and in the Canadian Football League (CFL) for the Winnipeg Blue Bombers.

== Early life ==
Sims-Walker played high school football at Edgewater High School in Orlando, Florida.

== College career ==
Sims-Walker played college football at the University of Central Florida, where he was a teammate of fellow NFL receiver Brandon Marshall.

Sims-Walker played in 12 games as a true freshman and has 21 receptions for 337 yards. During his sophomore year, he played six games at cornerback due to injuries to the team. He had 9 catches for 191 yards, and also had three interceptions while playing defense. During his junior year, he played exclusively as wide receiver and ranked second on the team with 64 receptions for 855 yards and 9 touchdowns. During his senior year, he set the UCF record for most receptions in a single season with 90. He was a two-time All-Conference USA Selection during his collegiate career. He played in a total of 46 career games with 184 receptions for 2,561 yards (13.9 ypc average).

== Professional career ==
Pre-draft measurables
Height	Weight	40-yard dash	10-yard split	20-yard split	20-yard shuttle	Three-cone drill	Vertical jump	Broad jump	Bench press
6 ft 2 in (1.88 m)	209 lb (95 kg)	4.35 s	1.54 s	2.53 s	4.39 s	6.92 s	36.5 in (0.93 m)	10 ft 1 in (3.07 m)	18 reps

=== Jacksonville Jaguars (first stint) ===
Sims-Walker was selected by the Jaguars in the third round of the 2007 NFL draft. He was unable to play during his first season because of a knee injury suffered in the fourth preseason game against the Washington Redskins.

In 2008, he played in nine games posting 16 receptions for 217 yards.

In 2009, Sims-Walker rebounded to become the Jaguars' leader in receptions (63) and receiving yards (869).

=== St. Louis Rams ===
After the 2010-2011 season, Sims-Walker became a free agent. On July 29, 2011, he was signed by the St. Louis Rams. He was released on October 17, 2011.

=== Jacksonville Jaguars (second stint) ===
On October 19, Sims-Walker re-signed with the Jaguars. He was placed on the injured reserve list on November 2, ending his season. He was released from the injured reserve list on December 4, 2011.

=== Winnipeg Blue Bombers ===
On August 27, 2013, Sims-Walker signed with the Winnipeg Blue Bombers of the Canadian Football League. He signed with the Bombers halfway through the 2013 CFL season. He was released by the Blue Bombers on March 6, 2014.

== Personal life ==
In 2009, Walker officially changed his surname to Sims-Walker to honor his father, Michael Sims, who died from colon cancer on December 6, 2008. In 2010, he created the Mike Sims-Walker Foundation to honor his father. Through his foundation, he launched the Playmaker 11 Scholarship that provided 10 $200 one-time book stipends and one $1,000 book stipend to graduating high school seniors in the Jacksonville-area and his hometown of Orlando, Florida.

Sims-Walker is the uncle of Jeff Sims, who currently plays quarterback at Arizona State. He is also the uncle of Detroit Pistons player Paul Reed.

== In popular culture ==
Sims-Walker, along with fellow Orlando native and NFL player Chris Johnson, has a unique celebration animation, the "Chopper City Juke," in Madden NFL 11.
