= Kevin Smith (running back) =

American football player (born 1986)

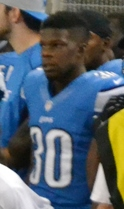
- Smith with the Detroit Lions in 2012

LSU Tigers
- Title: Running backs coach

Personal information
- Born: December 17, 1986 (age 39); Miami, Florida, U.S.
- Listed height: 6 ft 1 in (1.85 m)
- Listed weight: 217 lb (98 kg)

Career information
- High school: Miami Southridge
- College: UCF (2004–2007)
- NFL draft: 2008: 3rd round, 64th overall pick

Career history

Playing
- Detroit Lions (2008–2012); Winnipeg Blue Bombers (2014)*
- * Offseason or practice squad member only

Coaching
- UCF (2015) Coaching intern; UCF (2016) Quality control administrator; Florida Atlantic (2017–2019) Running backs coach; Ole Miss (2020–2021) Running backs coach; Miami (FL) (2022) Running backs coach; Ole Miss (2023–2025) Running backs coach; LSU (2026–present) Running backs coach

Awards and highlights
- Consensus All-American (2007); NCAA rushing yards leader (2007); NCAA rushing touchdowns leader (2007); NCAA scoring leader (2007); C-USA Offensive Player of the Year (2007); First-team All-Conference USA (2007); Second-team All-Conference USA (2006); UCF Knights No. 24 honored

Career NFL statistics
- Rushing attempts: 598
- Rushing yards: 2,346
- Rushing touchdowns: 17
- Receptions: 123
- Receiving yards: 1,082
- Receiving touchdowns: 5
- Stats at Pro Football Reference

Kevin Ryan Smith (born December 17, 1986) is an American professional football coach and former running back who is the running backs coach at LSU. He played college football for the UCF Knights, receiving consensus All-American honors in 2007. Smith was selected by the Detroit Lions in the third round of the 2008 NFL draft, and played for the Lions for five seasons.

== Early life ==
Smith attended Southridge High School in Miami, Florida. In football, he was a three-year letterman, a two-time All-Dade County selection as both a running back and a safety, and as a junior, rushed for 1,125 yards and 15 touchdowns.

== College career ==
Smith attended the University of Central Florida, where he played for the UCF Knights football team from 2004 to 2007. He had a standout college career as a Knight, becoming UCF's all-time leading rusher after just three seasons (2005–07). He started 34 out of 36 games for the Knights, establishing new career records with 905 carries for 4,864 yards (5.37 avg) and 45 touchdowns. His 4,864 yards rank second in Conference USA history, and his 180 points scored in 2007 rank fourth on the NCAA season-record chart. During his junior campaign, Smith set a major college record of 450 rushing attempts, topping the old mark of 405 carries by Marcus Allen (USC) in 1981 and falling just 62 yards shy of setting the NCAA season-rushing record of 2,628 yards set by former Lion Barry Sanders (Oklahoma State) in 1988.

Early in his last season, Smith was touted as a dark horse candidate for the Heisman Trophy, and ended up finishing in eighth place with 55 total points and three first-place votes to become the second UCF player (after Daunte Culpepper) to receive Heisman votes.

He was also the first consensus All-American from UCF, being selected to almost every 2007 All-American First-team, including SI.com's.

== Professional career ==
=== Pre-draft ===
Pre-draft measurables
Height	Weight	Arm length	Hand span	40-yard dash	10-yard split	20-yard split	20-yard shuttle	Three-cone drill	Vertical jump	Broad jump	Bench press
6 ft 1 1/8 in (1.86 m)	217 lb (98 kg)	32 1/4 in (0.82 m)	9 3/4 in (0.25 m)	4.45 s	1.54 s	2.57 s	4.49 s	6.74 s	33.5 in (0.85 m)	10 ft 0 in (3.05 m)	15 reps
All values from NFL Combine/Pro Day

Smith was projected as a third- to fourth-round pick.

=== Detroit Lions ===
Smith was selected by the Detroit Lions in the third round, 64th overall, of the 2008 NFL draft. He signed a 3-year, $1.79 million contract on July 22, 2008.

After an impressive preseason showing, Smith was named the starting running back for the Lions for the 2008 season. He was backed by former Cincinnati Bengals star running back Rudi Johnson, whom the Lions had signed just days before the first game of the season. Smith was benched after Week 4 and was briefly replaced by Johnson, before winning back the starting spot for the duration of the season.

In 2008, Smith led the Lions in rushing attempts (238), rushing yards (976; fourth in the league among rookie rushers), rushing average (4.1) and rushing touchdowns (8; third-highest tally by a rookie in team history).

In Week 8 of the 2009 season against the St. Louis Rams, Smith tackled James Butler off an interception in the end zone for a safety after Butler ran out and then ran back in the end zone.

On March 3, 2011, the Lions declined to tender an offer to Smith, making him an unrestricted free agent for the upcoming NFL season. However, on November 7, he was re-signed by Detroit. The move became necessary after Jahvid Best was sidelined following his second concussion of the year. On November 20, Smith ran for 140 yards on 16 carries and 61 yards on four receptions. He ran for two touchdowns and caught another as the Lions came back from a 17-point deficit to defeat the Carolina Panthers 49–35. On November 24, he was carted off the sidelines after a non-contact injury to his lower leg during the second quarter. It was later revealed that he had a mild ankle sprain with an undetermined return date. After missing several games in December, Kevin Smith returned to the field in Week 16 and found the end zone once through the air and once on the ground as the Lions defeated the San Diego Chargers 38–10. Smith’s second touchdown, a 6-yard run in the third quarter, gave the Lions 51 touchdowns on the season, establishing a new franchise high. He finished the game with 15 carries for 49 yards and two receptions for 12 yards.

=== Winnipeg Blue Bombers ===
On May 20, 2014, Smith signed with the Winnipeg Blue Bombers of the Canadian Football League. On June 2, he was released after pulling a hamstring on the first day of training camp.

== Coaching career ==
=== UCF ===
Following his playing career, Smith returned to UCF as a coaching intern under head coach George O'Leary in 2015. The following season, he was kept on staff of newly hired head coach Scott Frost and became the Quality control administrator.

=== FAU ===
In 2017, after Lane Kiffin became the head coach of Florida Atlantic University, Smith was hired as Kiffin's running backs coach. They worked together at FAU from 2017 to 2019, when Kiffin left for Ole Miss.

Under Smith’s tutelage at FAU, Devin Singletary became the first running back in NCAA history to score 29 touchdowns in a season since Smith did it himself as a star at UCF. In Smith's first year at FAU, Singletary, whose 33 total TDs rank third all-time in single-season touchdowns, was named the 2017 C-USA Most Valuable Player.

The 2017 FAU running back ranked No. 6 nationally in rushing yards per game (285.3). The No. 6 national ranking was a jump of 45 spots from the previous year. Singletary and fellow FAU running back Kerrith Whyte were both selected in the 2019 NFL draft. Smith mentored the FAU running backs to three consecutive 2,000-yard rushing efforts, the best in school history.

=== Ole Miss ===
In 2020, Smith would accompany Kiffin to Ole Miss. Smith had a quick impact there, coaching the Southeastern Conference's (SEC) leading rushing attack. Ole Miss averaged 210.6 yards per game on the ground, leading the conference and ranking 26th overall. The Rebel running backs scored 19 touchdowns throughout the 10-game season, finishing 6th in the SEC. Jerrion Ealy and Snoop Conner, both sophomores, combined for 17 touchdowns; Ealy's nine led the team. Under Smith's tutelage, Ealy was named second-team All-SEC by Pro Football Focus. Both Ealy and Conner would later go on to play professionally in the National Football League.

In 2021, three of Smith's running backs (Ealy, Conner and Henry Parrish Jr.) ranked in the top 25 of the SEC in total rushing yards at the end of the regular season. Ole Miss placed 12th in the FBS in rushing yards in 2021, with 2,829 yards for an average of 217.6 per game.

=== Miami ===
In 2022, Kevin Smith was hired by newly hired Miami head coach Mario Cristobal. Ole Miss running back Henry Parrish Jr. decided to follow Smith to Miami, where the former was named All-ACC honors that season.

=== Ole Miss (second stint) ===
Ole Miss finished 8-5 in 2022 after being 10-2 the previous season. After the season, Smith was brought back as the running backs coach.

In 2023, Smith's running backs were part of a dynamic run attack that led Ole Miss to its first 11-win season in program history, as well as a 2023 Peach Bowl victory. The Rebels were 7th in the SEC in running offense and scored 29 touchdowns on the ground, ranking 5th in the University's history.

Smith coached the dynamic running back duo of Quinshon Judkins and Ulysses Bentley IV. Judkins was the SEC Freshman of the Year and first team All-SEC honoree. He had 1,158 yards and 15 touchdowns, making him eighth in FBS history and the second in SEC history (Herschel Walker) to have 1,000 yards and 15 rushing touchdowns in their rookie and sophomore years. Bentley was named to the Earl Campbell Tyler Rose Award watch list and Reese's Senior Bowl watch list.

== Career statistics ==
=== NFL ===
Legend
**Bold**	Career high

==== Regular season ====
Year	Team	Games		Rushing					Receiving				
Year	Team	GP	GS	Att	Yds	Avg	Lng	TD	Rec	Yds	Avg	Lng	TD
2008	DET	**16**	12	**238**	**976**	4.1	**50**	**8**	39	286	7.3	27	0
2009	DET	13	**13**	217	747	3.4	31	4	**41**	**415**	10.1	**63**	1
2010	DET	6	0	34	133	3.9	15	0	11	123	**11.2**	27	0
2011	DET	7	4	72	356	**4.9**	43	4	22	179	8.1	28	**3**
2012	DET	12	2	37	134	3.6	19	1	10	79	7.9	13	1
		54	31	598	2,346	3.9	50	17	123	1,082	8.8	63	5

==== Playoffs ====
Year	Team	Games		Rushing					Receiving				
Year	Team	GP	GS	Att	Yds	Avg	Lng	TD	Rec	Yds	Avg	Lng	TD
2011	DET	**1**	**1**	**6**	**21**	**3.5**	**9**	0	**2**	**20**	**10.0**	**13**	0
		1	1	6	21	3.5	9	0	2	20	10.0	13	0

=== College ===
Legend
	Led the NCAA
**Bold**	Career high

			Rushing				Receiving		
Year	Team	GP	Att	Yards	Avg	TDs	Rec	Yards	TDs
2005	UCF	13	249	1,178	4.7	9	8	44	0
2006	UCF	9	206	934	4.5	7	23	158	0
2007	UCF	14	**450**	**2,567**	**5.7**	**29**	**24**	**242**	**1**
**College totals**		**36**	**905**	**4,679**	**5.2**	**45**	**55**	**444**	**1**

== See also ==
- List of NCAA major college football yearly rushing leaders
- List of NCAA major college football yearly scoring leaders
