= List of University of Central Florida alumni =

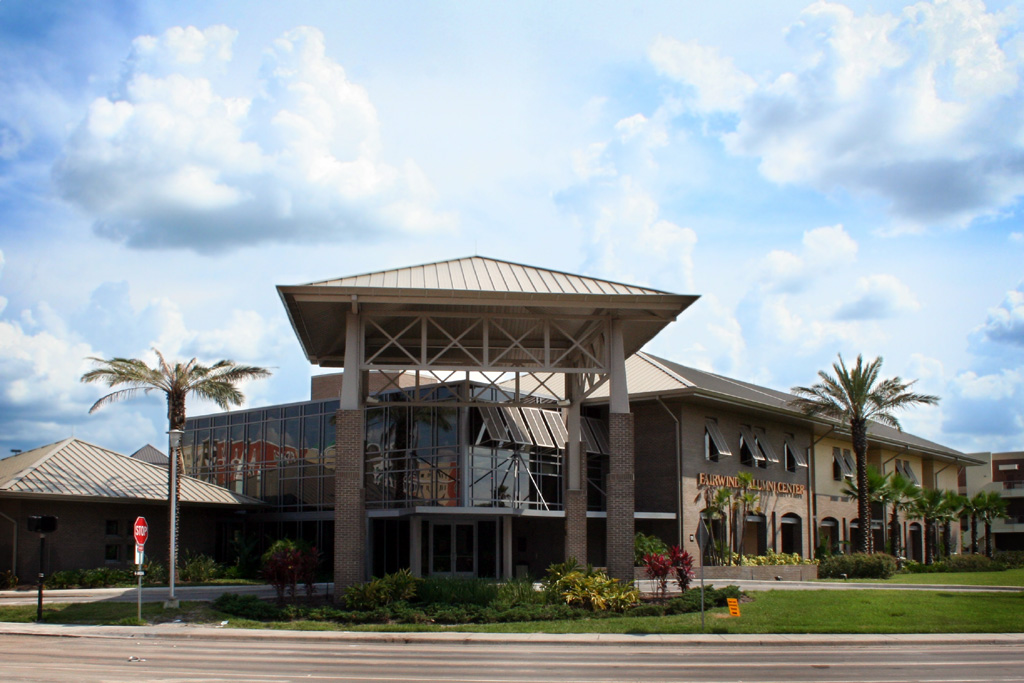
The FAIRWINDS Alumni Center at UCF

This list of University of Central Florida alumni includes notable graduates, former students, and current students of the University of Central Florida (UCF) in Orlando, Florida.

UCF is a public and space-grant university located on a 1,415-acre (5.73 km^{2}) main campus in Orlando. Founded in 1963 as Florida Technological University to support the growing space program at the Kennedy Space Center and Cape Canaveral Space Force Station, it is a member of the State University System of Florida and one of the largest universities in the United States by on-campus undergraduate enrollment. Since its first graduating class in 1970, UCF has awarded more than 470,000 degrees.

== Academia and research ==
- Gisele Bennett, professor at Georgia Tech and former director of Georgia Tech Electro-Optical Systems Laboratory
- Candice Bridge, forensic chemist and associate professor of chemistry at UCF
- Joey Fanfarelli, professor and researcher
- Christopher J. Ferguson, psychologist and researcher; professor at Stetson University
- Julius Fridriksson, neuroscientist; Vice President for Research at the University of South Carolina
- Stuart Fullerton, professor and entomologist; founder of UCF's "Bug Closet"
- Uma Gupta, academic and former president of Alfred State College; currently Director of Business Analytics at the University of South Carolina Upstate
- Teresa W. Haynes, mathematician and researcher; professor at East Tennessee State University
- Sameer Hinduja, criminologist and co-director of the Cyberbullying Research Center; professor at Florida Atlantic University
- Nagarajan Ranganathan, Distinguished Professor of Computer Science and Engineering at the University of South Florida; IEEE Fellow
- Debra Reinhart, professor and environmental engineer
- Robert Rennaker, professor, neural engineer and Distinguished Chair in Bioengineering at University of Texas at Dallas
- Eduardo Salas, industrial and organizational psychologist; currently Chair Professor at Rice University
- Alper Yilmaz, professor of geo-informatics at Ohio State University; researcher in computer vision, photogrammetry, and remote sensing
- Cynthia Y. Young, applied mathematician and founding dean of the College of Science at Clemson University; former Pegasus Professor and Vice Provost at UCF
- Andrea Zuvich, historian specializing in the House of Stuart and author

== Arts and entertainment ==
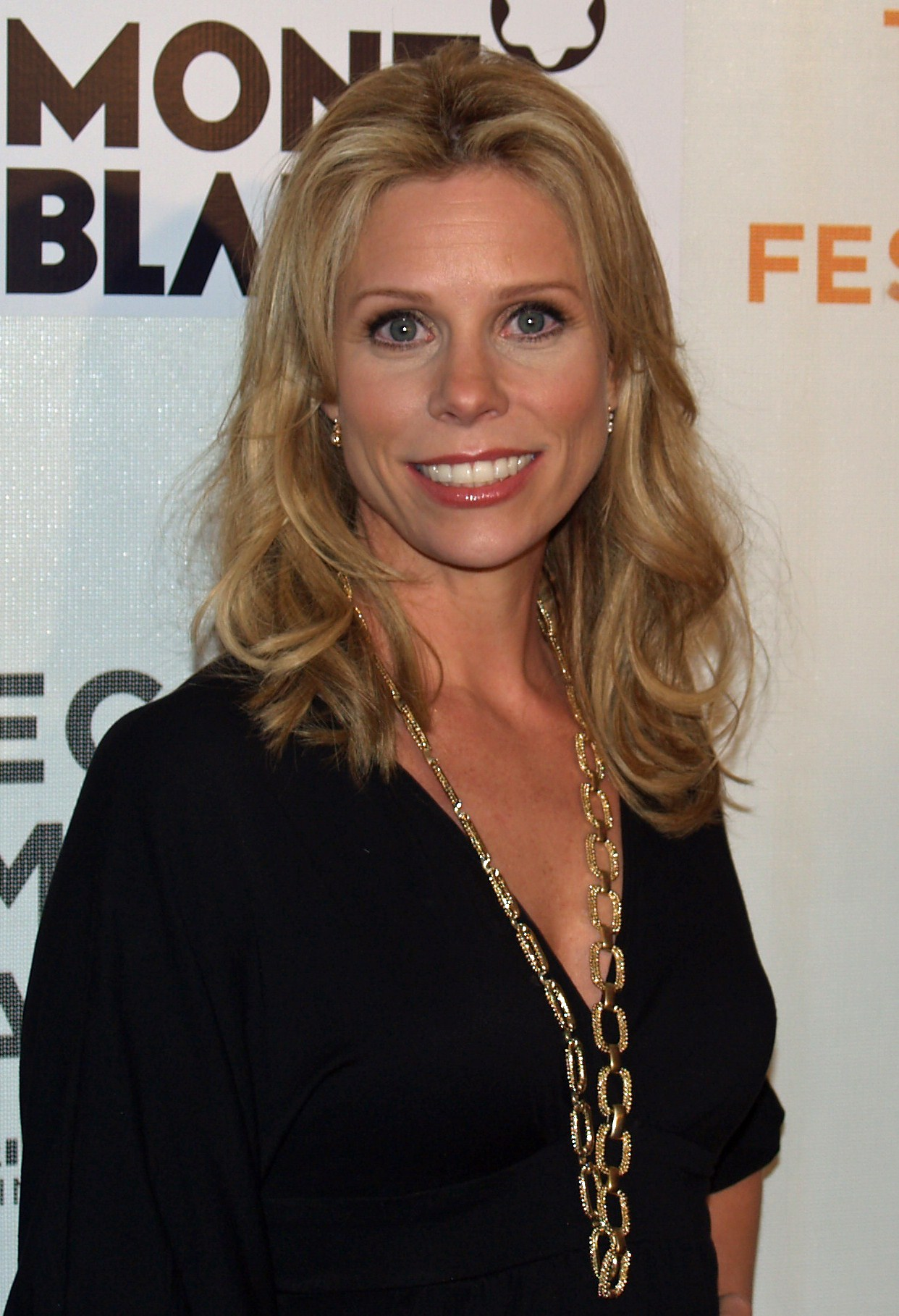
Cheryl Hines

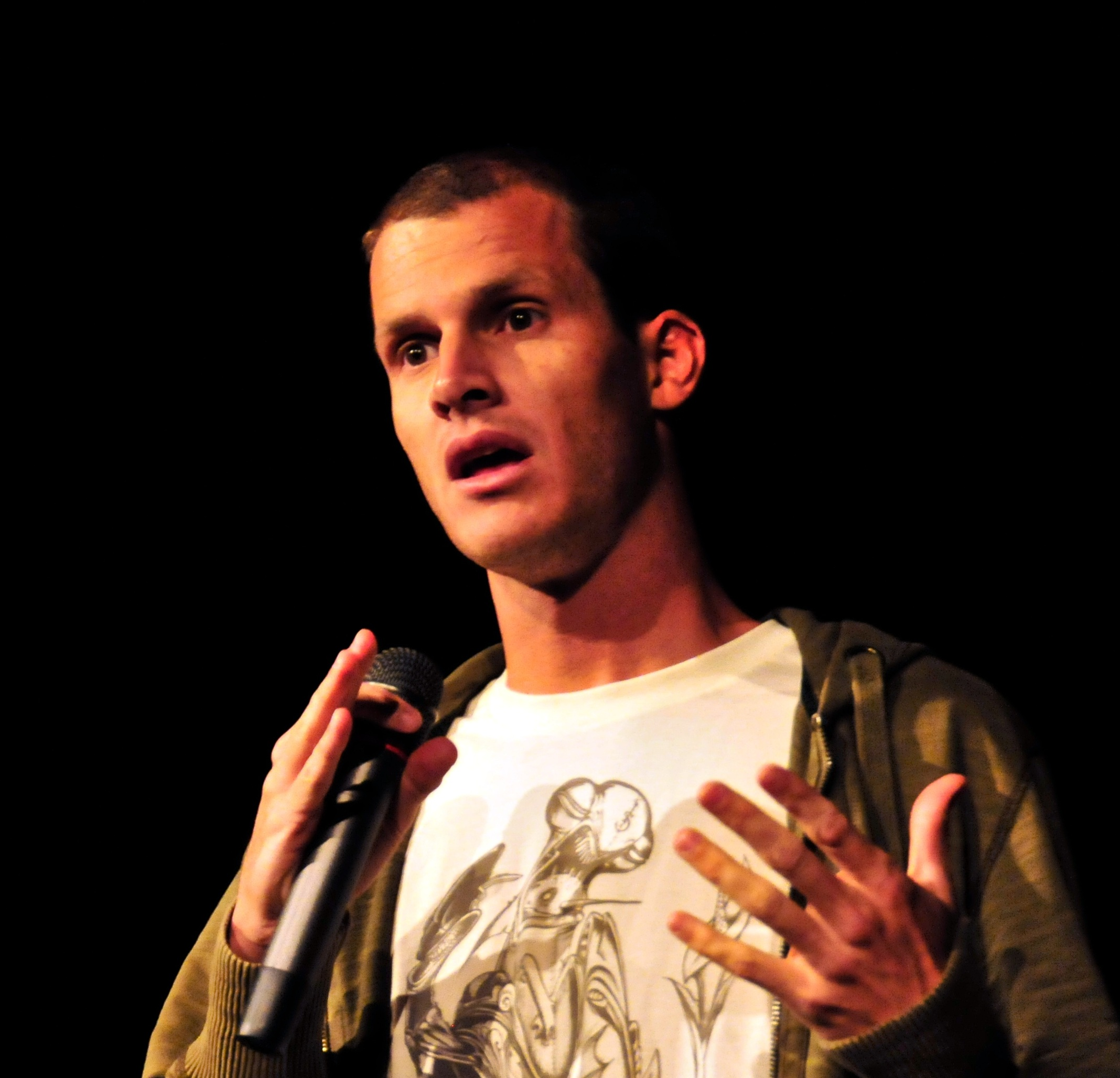
Daniel Tosh

- Steven Ameche, lawyer specializing in entertainment law; former producer at King World Productions/CBS and actor
- Francesca Battistelli, singer and songwriter
- Gabriela Berríos, model and pageant titleholder who represented Puerto Rico at Miss Universe 2014
- Teddy Blass, music composer and producer
- David Blue, actor; former star of Ugly Betty and Stargate Universe
- Mimi Chan, martial arts instructor, stunt performer and the life model reference for Disney’s animated film Mulan (1998 film)
- Robert Chapin, stunt choreographer, actor, visual effects artist, and director known for work on films including Hook and X-Men
- Kate Chastain, television personality known for Below Deck
- Stephen Christian, lead singer and songwriter for Anberlin
- Ashley Cariño, model and pageant titleholder who was crowned Miss Universe Puerto Rico 2022 and placed in the Top 5 at Miss Universe 2022
- Sierra Deaton, singer, songwriter, and dancer; co-winner of the 2013 season of The X Factor as part of the duo Alex & Sierra
- Dorian, rapper and producer
- Ericka Dunlap, Miss Florida 2003 and Miss America 2004
- Chris Fortier, DJ, record producer, and founder of Fade Records and the Balance Record Pool (attended)
- Chris Fuller, film director, writer, and producer known for Loren Cass
- Angelo Garcia, singer and songwriter for Menudo
- Shannon Gisela, actress known for the lead role in the series M.I.A.
- Teri Harrison, model and actress; Playboy centerfold Playmate
- Gregg Hale, film producer best known for The Blair Witch Project
- Cheryl Hines, Emmy-nominated actress
- Sarah Kambe Holland, film director, screenwriter, and actress
- Jessica Holmes, television presenter; former co-host of Slime Time Live
- Kyle Israel, sports analyst
- Kristina Janolo, Miss Florida 2011
- Sebastian Jones, film director and editor known for the documentary Everybody's Everything (attended)
- Kostya Kimlat, magician and motivational speaker known for appearing on Penn & Teller: Fool Us
- Sherri Littlefield, art curator and dealer; founder of treat gallery
- Michael Lynche, American Idol Season 9 finalist
- Sananda Maitreya (Terence Trent D'Arby), singer and songwriter (attended)
- Jonathan Mangum, actor and comedian; former star of Strip Mall and Drew Carey's Improv-A-Ganza
- Varteni Mosdichian, painter and artist
- Brittany Chrishawn Moore, film producer and musical artist
- Daniel Myrick, writer and director of The Blair Witch Project
- Brian Nolan, actor and producer known for The Lair and several Netflix films including Secret Obsession
- Brett Novek, actor and fashion model; former contestant on season one of America's Most Smartest Model
- Valery Ortiz, singer and actress on South of Nowhere
- Rebecca Parchment, Miss Cayman Islands 2007
- Plies, rapper and founder of Big Gates Records (attended)
- Scott Porter, actor and musician; former star of Friday Night Lights
- Rachel Potter, singer and actress known for Broadway roles in The Addams Family and Evita; contestant on The X Factor
- Qusai, rapper, DJ, and TV personality from Saudi Arabia
- Benjamin Rauhala, Broadway music director, arranger, and producer; known for American Psycho work
- Jaclyn Raulerson, Miss Florida 2010
- Moshe Reuven, singer-songwriter, and hip-hop artist (attended)
- Eduardo Sánchez, writer and director of The Blair Witch Project
- Kayla Sims (known as lilsimsie), YouTuber and Twitch streamer
- Monica Sorelle, filmmaker and visual artist; directed the feature film Mountains
- Mónica Spear, Miss Venezuela 2004 and 4th runner-up at Miss Universe 2005
- Chase Stokes, actor; co-star of the Netflix series Outer Banks (attended)
- Lauren Thompson, actor, television personality on Golf Channel and backstage interviewer on Total Nonstop Action Wrestling (TNA).
- Daniel Tosh, stand-up comedian and host of Comedy Central's Tosh.0
- Robert Venditti, comic book writer
- Nancy Yasecko, film educator and filmographer

== Business ==
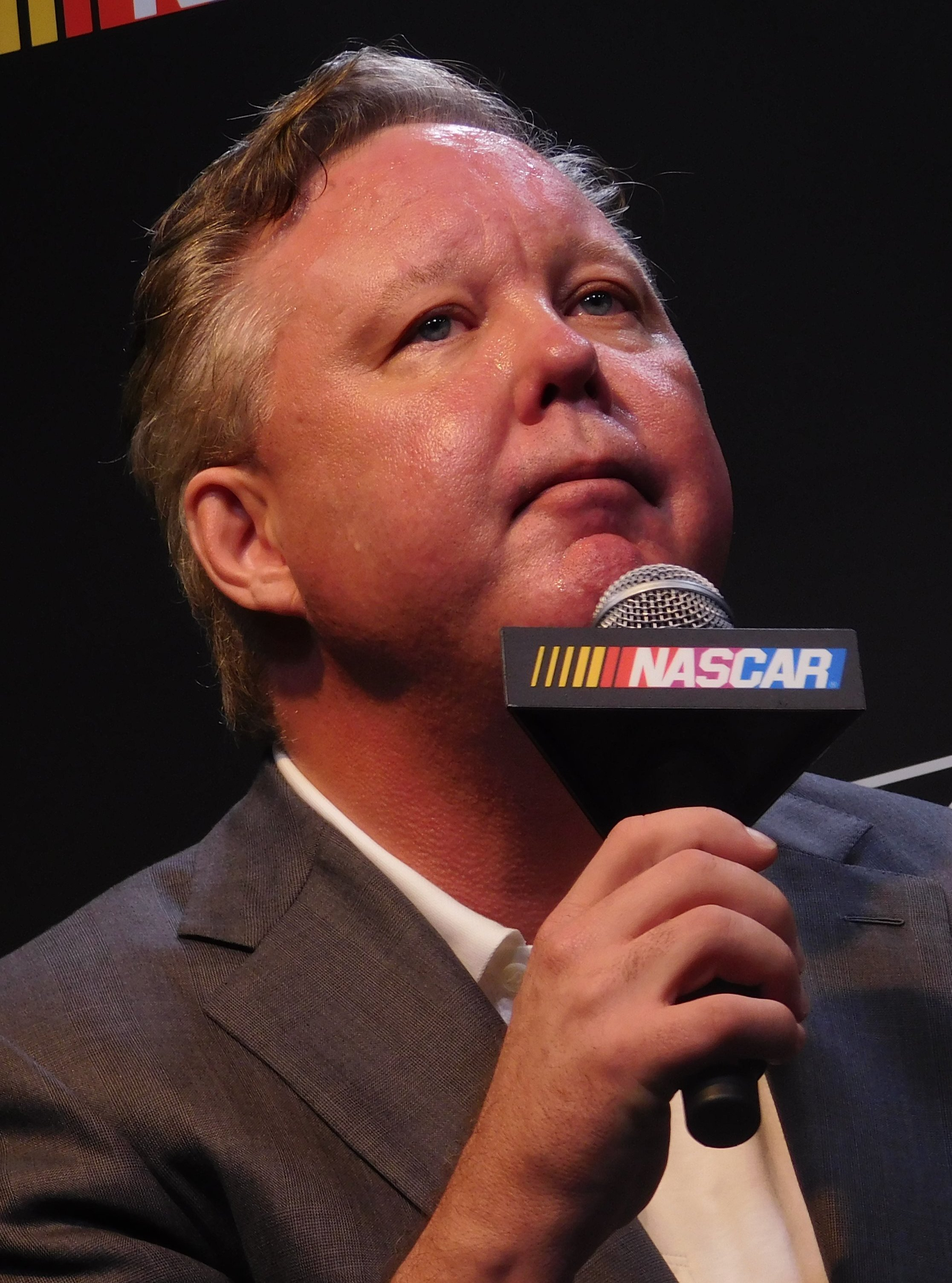
Brian France

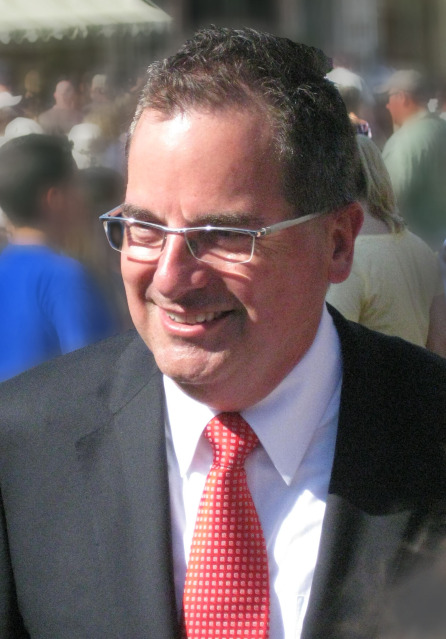
George Kalogridis

- Brian Acton, billionaire, co-founder of WhatsApp and executive chairperson of the Signal Foundation (attended)
- Jim Atchison, president and chief executive officer of SeaWorld Parks & Entertainment
- Dan Benjamin, tech entrepreneur and founder of 5by5 network and Fireside.fm
- Toby Crabel, hedge fund manager and founder of Crabel Capital Management
- Brian Crutcher, president and chief executive officer of Texas Instruments
- Dan Demole, co-founder and chief operating officer of Jingle Punks Music
- Brian France, chairman and chief executive officer of NASCAR
- Taylor Gerring, co-founder and former director of technology of Ethereum
- Jen Glantz, entrepreneur and author; founder of Bridesmaid for Hire
- Alan Gooch, executive director of the Orlando Sports Foundation
- John Hart, MLB Network analyst; former general manager of the Cleveland Indians and Texas Rangers
- Ian Ippolito, founder of vWorker, Planet Source Code, and the Real Estate Crowdfunding Review
- George Kalogridis, president of the Walt Disney World Resort
- Laurette Koellner, former president of Boeing International
- Mathew Lanigan, businessman
- Kristina Lavallee, chef, cake designer, and founder of The Cake Girl
- Alex Martins, president, chief executive officer, and chief operating officer of the Orlando Magic
- Cathleen H. Nash, former president and CEO of Woodforest National Bank and Citizens Republic Bancorp
- Salli Setta, president of Red Lobster
- Al Weiss, former president of worldwide operations for Walt Disney Parks and Resorts
- Jack Sweeney, programmer, founder and CEO of Ground Control who tracks private jets of public figures such as Elon Musk and Taylor Swift; Forbes 30 Under 30 honoree
- Chakri Toleti, founder and CEO of care.ai

== Civic, literature, and journalism ==
- John C. Bersia, winner of the Pulitzer Prize for Editorial Writing (2000)
- Jaquira Díaz, writer, journalist and cultural critic; author of Whiting Award-winning memoir Ordinary Girls
- Cindy Elavsky, syndicated columnist
- Saadia Faruqi, children's author known for the Yasmin series and interfaith activist
- Edgar Gomez, writer and author; winner of the American Book Award and Lambda Literary Award
- Marci Gonzalez, journalist and CBS News correspondent
- Jim Huber, sports anchor for CNN Sports Illustrated and sports commentator for Turner Sports
- Julie Iromuanya, author of Mr. and Mrs. Doctor, a PEN/Faulkner Award finalist
- Angela King, peace activist and co-founder of Life After Hate
- Dylan Lyons, multimedia journalist for Spectrum News 13 and WCJB-TV
- Shannon O'Donnell, travel writer and National Geographic Traveler of the Year
- Hector Perez, National Commissioner of the Boy Scouts of America; former member of the Florida Board of Governors
- Omar Raja, founder of House of Highlights; digital marketing producer and TV commentator for ESPN;
- Steven Sotloff, journalist for Time magazine
- Jenny Torres Sanchez, writer and author
- Yisel Tejeda, journalist and news anchor for Telemundo 31; multiple Emmy Award winner
- Peter Telep, New York Times bestselling author, educator and screenwriter who has collaborated with Tom Clancy
- Will Wight, New York Times bestselling fantasy author known for the Cradle series

== Government, law, public policy, and military ==
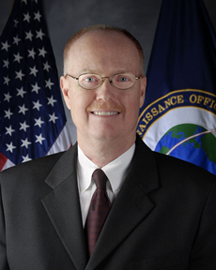
Scott F. Large

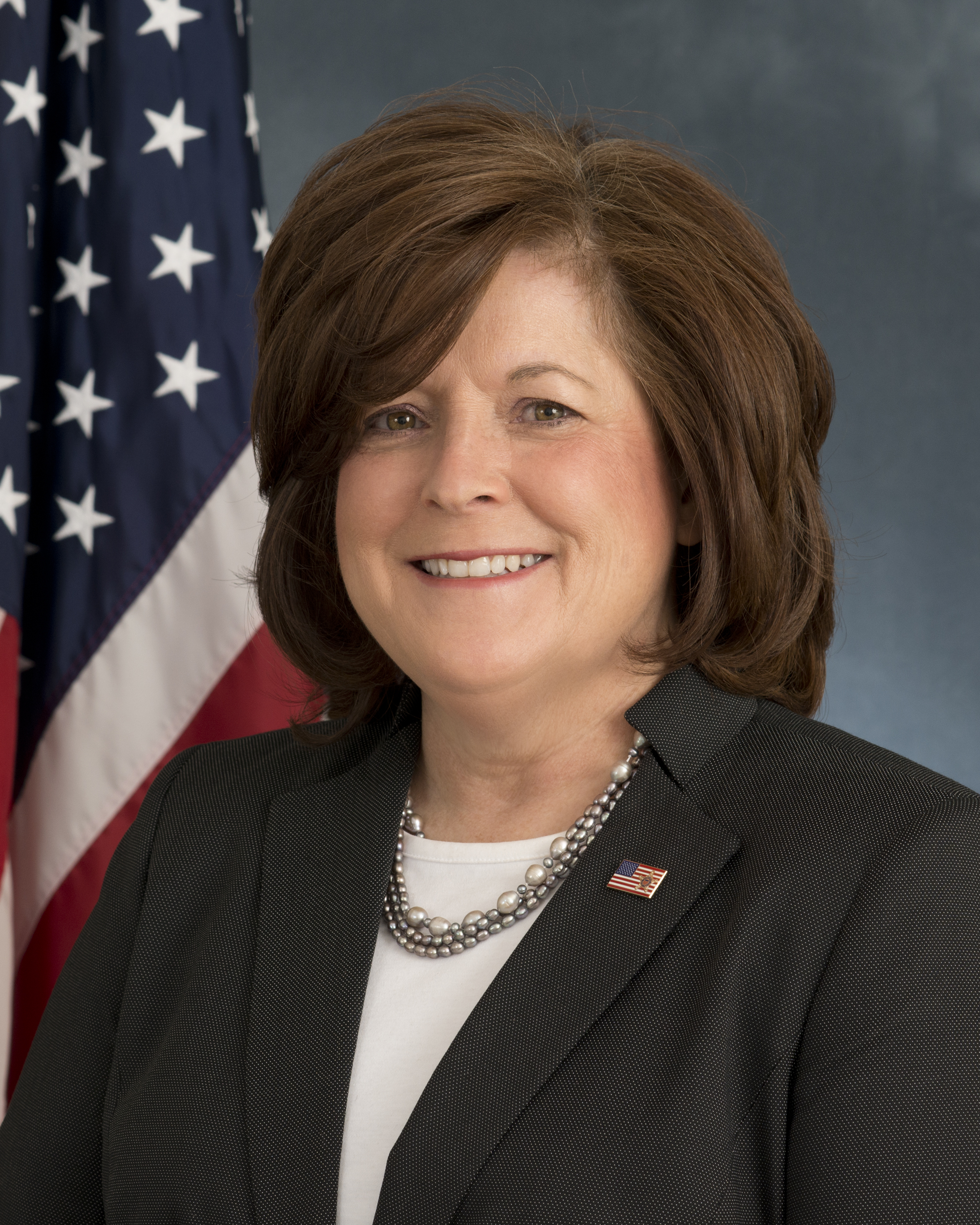
Julia Pierson

- Grace Bochenek, former acting United States Secretary of Energy, and former director of the National Energy Technology Laboratory
- Kyle Diamantas, acting Commissioner of Food and Drugs
- Sean Donahue, General Counsel of the U.S. Environmental Protection Agency
- J. Greg Hanson, former assistant sergeant at arms and first chief information officer of the United States Senate
- Kim Holmes, 22nd U.S. Assistant Secretary of State for International Organization Affairs
- R. Glenn Hubbard, dean of the Columbia Graduate School of Business; former deputy secretary at U.S. Department of Treasury and chairman of the Council of Economic Advisers
- Abdulmalik Al Khalili, Chairman of the Council of State of Oman
- Scott F. Large, 16th Director of the National Reconnaissance Office and former associate deputy director of Central Intelligence Agency (CIA)
- Julia Pierson, 23rd Director of the United States Secret Service
- Imbarek Shamekh, former prime minister of Libya and secretary general of the General People's Congress of Libya

=== State senators ===
- Randolph Bracy, former member of the Florida Senate
- Lee Constantine, former city commissioner of Altamonte Springs, Florida, Florida state senator, and Florida state representative
- Patricia Grogan, former member of the Florida Senate

=== State representatives ===
- Carolina Amesty, former state Florida state representative
- Bruce Antone, former Florida state representative
- Dick Batchelor, former Florida state representative
- Kim Berfield, Florida state representative
- Erika Booth, Florida state representative
- Mike Clelland, former Florida state representative
- Steve Crisafulli, Speaker of the Florida House of Representatives
- Anna Eskamani, Florida state representative
- Tim Geitner, former member of the Colorado House of Representatives
- Mike Horner, former Florida state representative
- Randy Johnson, former Florida state representative
- Traci Koster, member of the Florida House of Representatives
- Chris Latvala, former member of Florida House of Representatives; Pinellas County Commissioner
- Dick Locke, former member of the Florida House of Representatives for the 26th district (1982–1990)
- Susan Lontine, former member of the Colorado House of Representatives
- Bobby Olszewski, former Florida House of Representatives member
- Amber Mariano, former Florida House of Representatives member; youngest person ever elected to the Florida House
- Rene Plasencia, Florida state representative
- John Quiñones, former Florida state representative
- David Richardson, Florida state representative
- Joe Saunders, former Florida state representative
- Robert C. Schenck, former Florida state representative
- Derek Skees, former Montana state representative
- Dwayne Taylor, Florida state representative
- John Taylor, Pennsylvania state representative

=== Law ===
- Kevin Beary, former sheriff of Orange County, Florida
- Cynthia J. Becker, former judge of DeKalb County Superior Court in Georgia
- Mark O'Mara, attorney and CNN legal analyst
- Lawrence G. Walters, First Amendment attorney and anti-censorship advocate; founder of Walters Law Group

=== Mayors and local government ===
- Richard Crotty, former mayor of Orange County, Florida; charter member of the UCF Board of Trustees
- M. Rony Francois, former secretary of the Florida Department of Health
- Bill Partington, member of the Florida House of Representatives; former mayor of Ormond Beach
- Kahsennenhawe Sky-Deer, Grand Chief of the Mohawks of Kahnawà:ke
- Eric Smith, former Florida Commissioner of Education
- Denver Stutler, former secretary of the Florida Department of Transportation and chief of staff for Florida Governor Jeb Bush

=== Military ===
- Robert P. Burke, vice admiral, USN; 58th Chief of Naval Personnel
- Michael Carey, brigadier general, USAF
- D. Jason Cothern, major general, USSF; deputy director of the Missile Defense Agency and former deputy commander of Space Systems Command
- Malcolm I. Fages, vice admiral, USN, ret.; former Deputy Chairman of the NATO Military Committee
- John S. Kolasheski, lieutenant general, USA, ret.; former commanding general of V Corps

== Space, science, and engineering ==
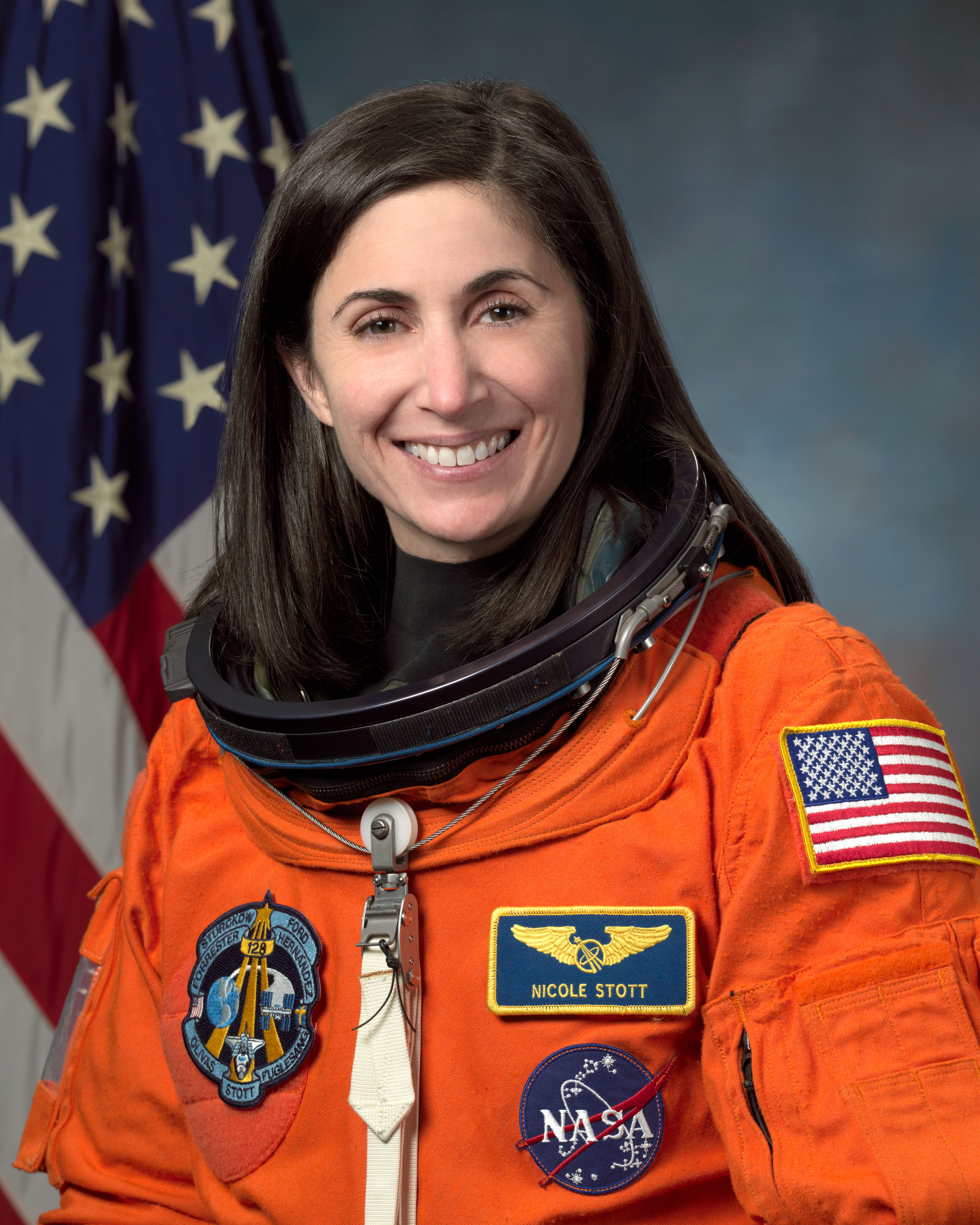
Nicole Stott

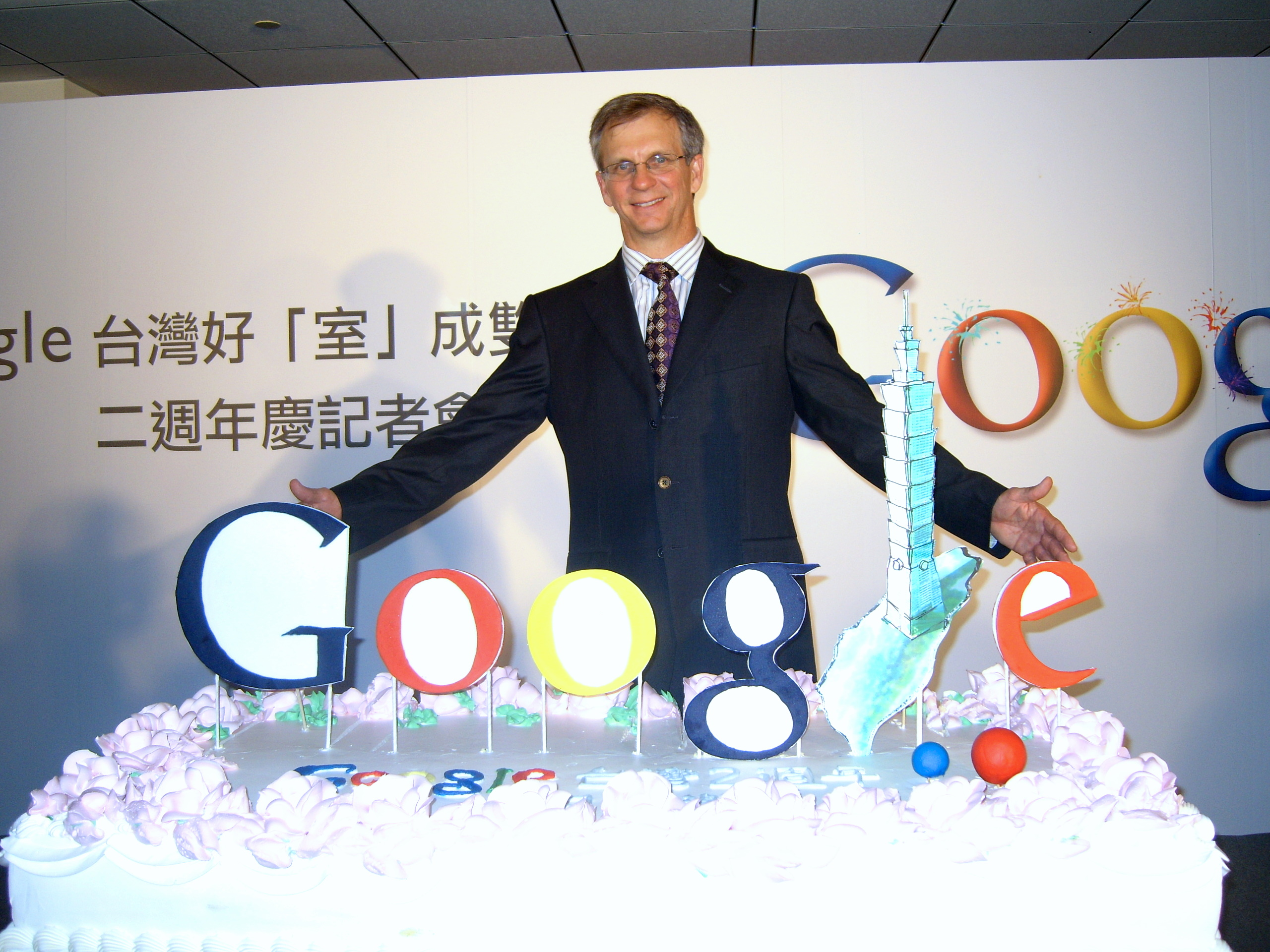
Alan Eustace

- Tinku Acharya, computer scientist, inventor, IEEE Fellow, and known for IoT
- Félicie Albert, physicist specializing in plasma acceleration; Director at Lawrence Livermore National Laboratory and recipient of the Presidential Early Career Award for Scientists and Engineers
- Michelle Amos, electronics design engineer at NASA's John F. Kennedy Space Center
- Fernando Caldeiro, former NASA astronaut
- Kenneth Dion, former president of Sigma Theta Tau, and assistant dean at Johns Hopkins School of Nursing
- Frank Effenberger, electrical engineer; Vice President at Futurewei Technologies and IEEE/OSA Fellow
- Isabel Escobar, EPA Science to Achieve Results (STAR) fellow and environmental researcher
- Alan Eustace, Google senior vice president of engineering and knowledge; holds the world record for the highest-altitude free-fall space dive
- Melissa Jones, NASA landing and recovery director for the Exploration Ground Systems Program
- Ramon Lugo III, former director of NASA's Glenn Research Center
- Kim Medley, environmental scientist and director of the Tyson Research Center at Washington University in St. Louis
- Philip T. Metzger, planetary physicist and co-founded NASA's Swamp Works program
- William W. Parsons, former director of NASA's John F. Kennedy Space Center and John C. Stennis Space Center; Space Shuttle program manager
- Gabriel Popescu, optical engineer and pioneer of quantitative phase imaging
- Chandler Powell, conservationist and television personality; former professional wakeboarder and husband of Bindi Irwin
- Jacqueline Quinn, NASA environmental engineer and inventor of emulsified zerovalent iron (EZVI); inducted into National Inventors Hall of Fame
- Lesa Roe, former acting deputy administrator of NASA and director of NASA's Langley Research Center
- Lee R. Scherer, former director of NASA's John F. Kennedy Space Center
- Nicole Stott, NASA astronaut
- Christina C. C. Willis, laser scientist and optics specialist

== Sports ==
=== Baseball ===
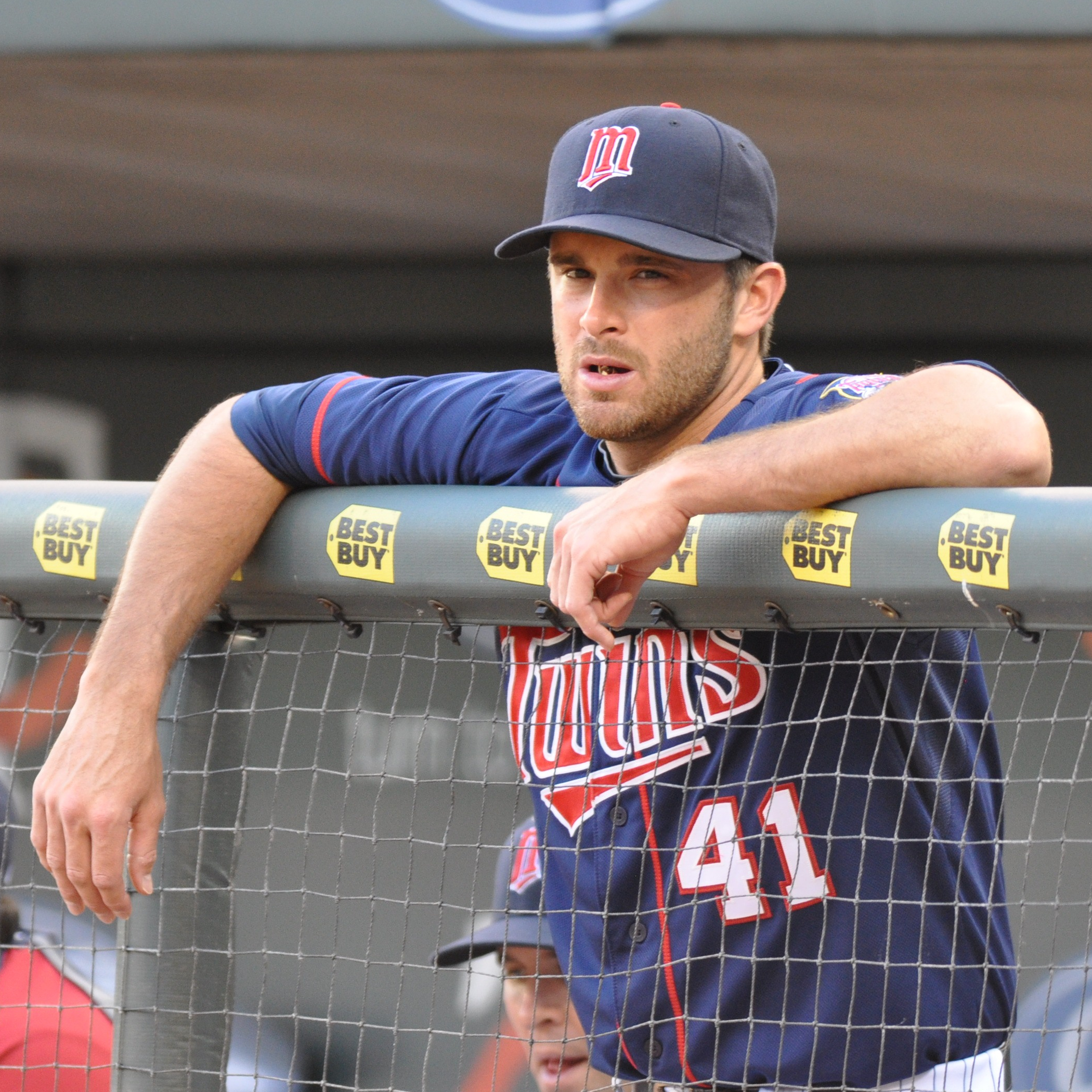
Drew Butera

- Cody Allen, former MLB pitcher for the Cleveland Indians and Los Angeles Angels
- Adam Beck, MLB umpire
- Chasen Bradford, former MLB pitcher
- Drew Butera, former MLB catcher for the Los Angeles Angels
- Vince Cotroneo, longtime MLB play-by-play announcer
- Craig Cozart, college baseball coach at UCF and High Point
- Matt Fox, former MLB pitcher for the Boston Red Sox, Minnesota Twins, and Seattle Mariners
- Alex Freeland, MLB infielder for the Los Angeles Dodgers
- Colton Gordon, MLB pitcher for the Milwaukee Brewers
- Ben Lively, MLB pitcher for the Cincinnati Reds
- Mike Maroth, former MLB pitcher for the Detroit Tigers and St. Louis Cardinals
- Dylan Moore, MLB infielder for the Seattle Mariners
- Chad Mottola, coach for the Tampa Bay Rays; former MLB outfielder for the Cincinnati Reds, Toronto Blue Jays, Miami Marlins, and Baltimore Orioles
- Rob Radlosky, former MLB pitcher for the Minnesota Twins
- Eric Skoglund, former MLB pitcher for the Kansas City Royals
- Esix Snead, former MLB outfielder for the New York Mets
- Darnell Sweeney, former professional utility player for the Sioux Falls Canaries
- Beau Taylor, former MLB catcher for the Oakland Athletics, Toronto Blue Jays, and Cleveland Indians
- Clay Timpner, former MLB outfielder for the San Francisco Giants
- Thaddeus Ward, MLB pitcher for the Washington Nationals
- Dan Winkler, former MLB pitcher for the Chicago Cubs

=== Basketball ===
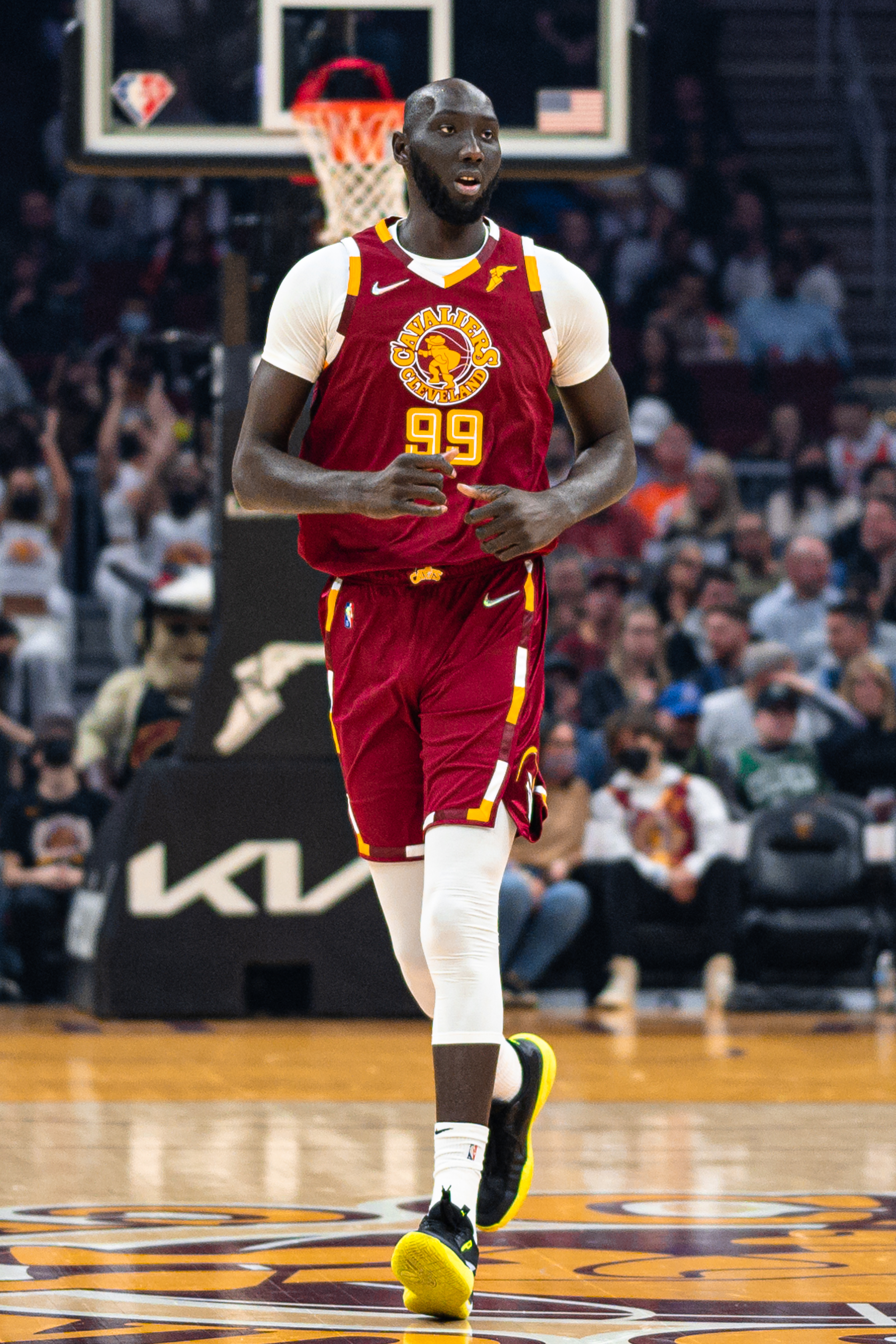
Tacko Fall

- Nick Banyard, professional basketball player
- Chad Brown, professional basketball player
- Emma Cannon, WNBA power forward
- Ray Carter, former professional basketball player and former member of the English national basketball team
- Keith Clanton, former professional basketball player
- A. J. Davis, professional basketball player
- Shaheed Davis, professional basketball player
- Tacko Fall, NBA player for the Philadelphia 76ers
- Brandon Goodwin, NBA G League player
- Joey Graham, former NBA player; drafted 16th overall by the Toronto Raptors in 2005
- Stephen Graham, former NBA player and coach
- Taylor Hendricks, NBA player; drafted 9th overall by the Utah Jazz in 2023
- Mark Jones, former NBA player
- Jeffrey Jordan, son of Michael Jordan
- Marcus Jordan, son of Michael Jordan
- Masseny Kaba, player for the Guinea women's national basketball team
- Stan Kimbrough, former NBA point guard
- Matt Milon, professional basketball player
- Darius Perry, professional basketball player
- Josh Peppers, professional basketball player
- Tari Phillips, former WNBA player
- Isaac Sosa, professional basketball player
- Isaiah Sykes, professional basketball player
- Jermaine Taylor, former NBA player
- Matt Williams, former NBA player
- Kenrick Zondervan, former professional basketball player

=== Combat Sports ===
- Jim Alers, professional mixed martial artist; former Cage Warriors Featherweight Champion and Ultimate Fighting Championship (UFC) fighter
- Parker Boudreaux, professional wrestler for All Elite Wrestling (AEW); former football player for UCF
- Christina Crawford, professional wrestler for World Wrestling Entertainment (WWE)
- Dasha Gonzalez, professional wrestler for All Elite Wrestling
- Tom Lawlor, three-time national champion in the NCWA (2003, 2004, 2005); mixed martial artist for the UFC
- Seth Petruzelli, competed on The Ultimate Fighter 2; retired professional UFC mixed martial artist
- Felicia Spencer, former mixed martial artist; Invicta FC Featherweight Champion and UFC title challenger
- Von Wagner (Calvin Bloom), professional wrestler formerly with WWE/NXT; former football player for UCF
- Josh Woods, professional wrestler for All Elite Wrestling (AEW) and Ring of Honor; former ROH Pure Champion

=== Football ===
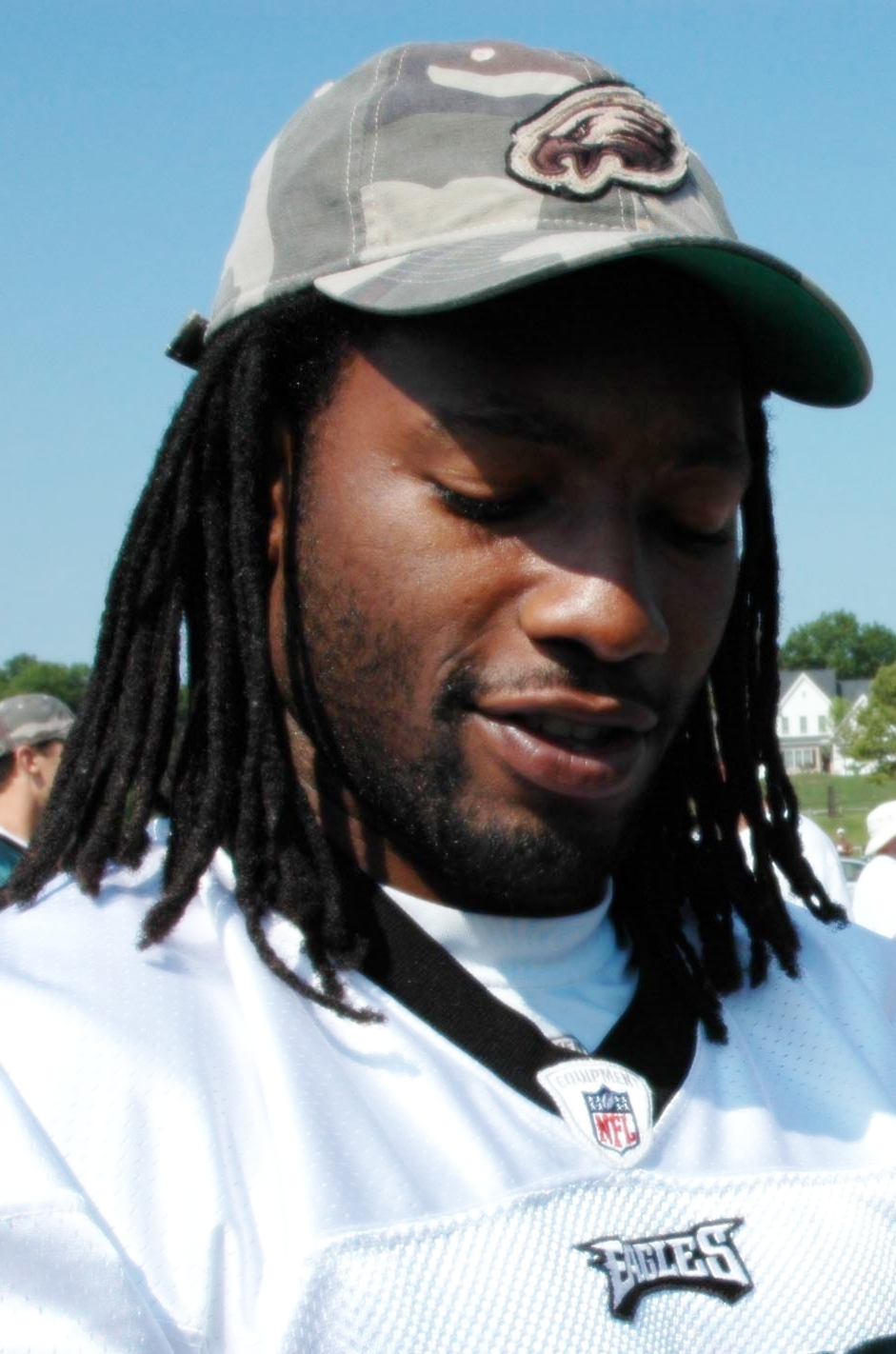
Asante Samuel

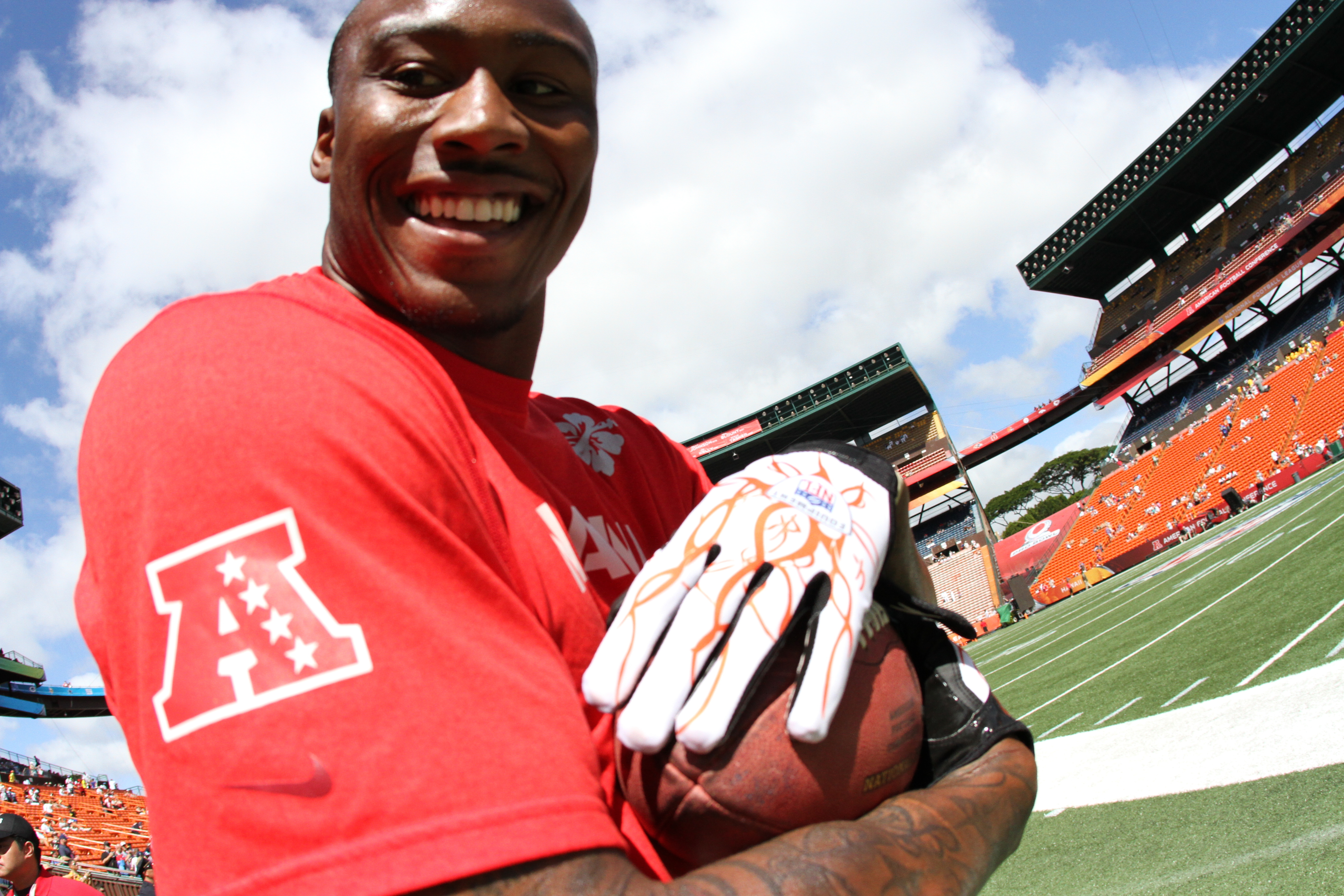
Brandon Marshall

- Kamar Aiken, former NFL wide receiver
- Jordan Akins, NFL tight end
- Brandon Alexander, CFL defensive back
- Otis Anderson Jr., former NFL running back
- Sheldon Arnold, CFL defensive back
- Javon Baker, NFL wide receiver
- Brad Banks, former CFL quarterback
- Charlie Baumann, former NFL placekicker
- Tim Beck, head coach at Coastal Carolina
- Sean Beckton, associate head coach at UCF and former AFL wide receiver
- Sylvester Bembery, Arena Football Hall of Fame lineman
- Tatum Bethune, NFL linebacker
- Atari Bigby, former NFL safety
- Blake Bortles, former NFL quarterback; 3rd overall pick in the 2014 NFL draft
- A. J. Bouye, former NFL cornerback; All-Pro and Pro Bowl selections
- Patrick Brown, former NFL offensive tackle
- Siaha Burley, former NFL player and AFL head coach of the Jacksonville Sharks
- Joe Burnett, former NFL cornerback
- Davin Bush, former CFL halfback
- Rob Calabrese, offensive assistant coach for the Los Angeles Rams
- Paul Carrington, former NFL defensive end
- Kenny Clark, former NFL wide receiver
- Nevelle Clarke, UFL defensive back
- Bret Cooper, former AFL wide receiver/defensive back
- Daunte Culpepper, former NFL quarterback; Minnesota Vikings 50 Greatest, Madden NFL 2002 cover, Sammy Baugh Trophy winner
- Elgin Davis, former NFL running back
- Kalia Davis, NFL defensive tackle
- Gabe Davis, NFL wide receiver
- Troy Davis, former NFL linebacker
- Donald De La Haye, UFL placekicker; YouTuber known as Deestroying
- Reggie Doster, former NFL defensive back
- Leger Douzable, former NFL defensive end and sports commentator
- Steve Edwards, former NFL offensive lineman
- Travis Fisher, former NFL cornerback and college position coach
- Ryan Flinn, former NFL punter
- Bernard Ford, former NFL wide receiver
- Jordan Franks, former NFL tight end
- Jimmy Fryzel, former NFL wide receiver
- Doug Gabriel, former NFL wide receiver
- Cedric Gagné-Marcoux, former CFL guard
- Michael Gaines, former NFL tight end
- Clayton Geathers, former NFL safety and current UCF football position coach
- Jacoby Glenn, former NFL cornerback
- Jeff Godfrey, former NFL slotback
- Alan Gooch, former UCF coach (1983–2003)
- Tay Gowan, NFL cornerback
- Richie Grant, NFL safety
- Cornell Green, former NFL tackle
- Shaquem Griffin, former NFL linebacker; 2019 Sports Emmy Award and NCAA Inspiration Award recipient
- Shaquill Griffin, NFL cornerback; Pro Bowl selection
- Franco Grilla, former AFL kicker
- Mike Gruttadauria, former NFL center
- Rannell Hall, former NFL wide receiver and cornerback
- Rick Hamilton, former NFL linebacker
- Jacob Harris, NFL wide receiver
- Clinton Hart, former NFL safety
- RJ Harvey, NFL running back
- Alex Haynes, former NFL running back
- Trysten Hill, NFL defensive tackle
- Darin Hinshaw, assistant coach at Purdue and former AFL quarterback
- Kobe Hudson, NFL wide receiver
- Mike Hughes, NFL cornerback
- Charley Hughlett, NFL long snapper
- Kemal Ishmael, former NFL safety
- Rashad Jeanty, former NFL defensive lineman
- Greg Jefferson, former NFL defensive lineman
- Shawn Jefferson, former NFL wide receiver; current New York Jets wide receivers coach
- Brandon Johnson, NFL wide receiver
- Darcy Johnson, former NFL tight end
- Storm Johnson, former NFL running back
- Travonti Johnson, former NFL and Arena Football safety
- Jacoby Jones, NFL wide receiver
- Ricot Joseph, former NFL safety
- D. J. Killings, CFL defensive back
- Adrian Killins, former NFL running back
- Charles Lee, former NFL wide receiver
- Matt Lee, NFL center
- Brandon Marshall, former NFL wide receiver; 10,000 Receiving Yards Club, 100 greatest Bears of all time, Hall of Fame nominee
- Chris Martin, former NFL offensive lineman
- Jordan McCray, UFL center
- Justin McCray, NFL guard
- Mac McWilliams, NFL cornerback
- Michael Merritt, former NFL fullback
- Bruce Miller, former NFL fullback
- Wyatt Miller, former NFL offensive tackle
- McKenzie Milton, quarterbacks coach for UCF Knights football
- Paul Miranda, former NFL cornerback
- Tre'Mon Morris-Brash, NFL linebacker
- Les Moss, head coach of the Bay Area Panthers
- Latavius Murray, NFL running back; Pro Bowl selection
- Jamar Newsome, former NFL wide receiver
- Tre Nixon, NFL wide receiver
- Elton Patterson, former NFL defensive end
- Breshad Perriman, former NFL wide receiver
- Jamiyus Pittman, former NFL defensive tackle
- Terrance Plummer, former NFL linebacker
- Matt Prater, NFL placekicker
- Sha'reff Rashad, former NFL safety
- Jah Reid, former NFL offensive tackle
- Josh Reese, former AFL wide receiver
- Aaron Robinson, NFL cornerback
- Taylor Robertson, former CFL guard
- Josh Robinson, former NFL cornerback
- Asante Samuel, former NFL cornerback; four-time Pro Bowl selections and New England Patriots All-Dynasty Team
- Keith Shologan, CFL defensive tackle
- Mike Sims-Walker, former NFL wide receiver
- Josh Sitton, former NFL offensive lineman; four-time Pro Bowl selection, Green Bay Packers Hall of Fame, Hall of Fame nominee
- Kevin Smith, former NFL running back
- Marquette Smith, former NFL running back
- Tre'Quan Smith, NFL wide receiver
- Bob Spitulski, former NFL linebacker
- William Stanback, CFL running back; Terry Evanshen Trophy winner (CFL East MVP)
- Ryan Swoboda, NFL offensive tackle
- Torell Troup, former NFL defensive tackle
- Alex Ward, NFL long snapper
- Leander Wiegand, NFL offensive lineman
- Marlon Williams, UFL wide receiver
- Divaad Wilson, NFL cornerback
- Ted Wilson, former NFL wide receiver
- Matthew Wright, NFL placekicker

=== Golf ===
- Connor Arendell, professional golfer on the European Tour and Web.com Tour
- Blayne Barber, professional golfer on the PGA Tour; winner of the 2011 Arnold Palmer Cup
- Robert Damron, professional golfer on the PGA Tour; winner of the 2001 Verizon Byron Nelson Classic
- Ricardo Gouveia, professional golfer on the European Tour
- Cliff Kresge, professional golfer on the PGA Tour
- Ben Leong, professional golfer on the Asian Tour; winner of the 2008 Worldwide Selangor Masters

=== Soccer ===
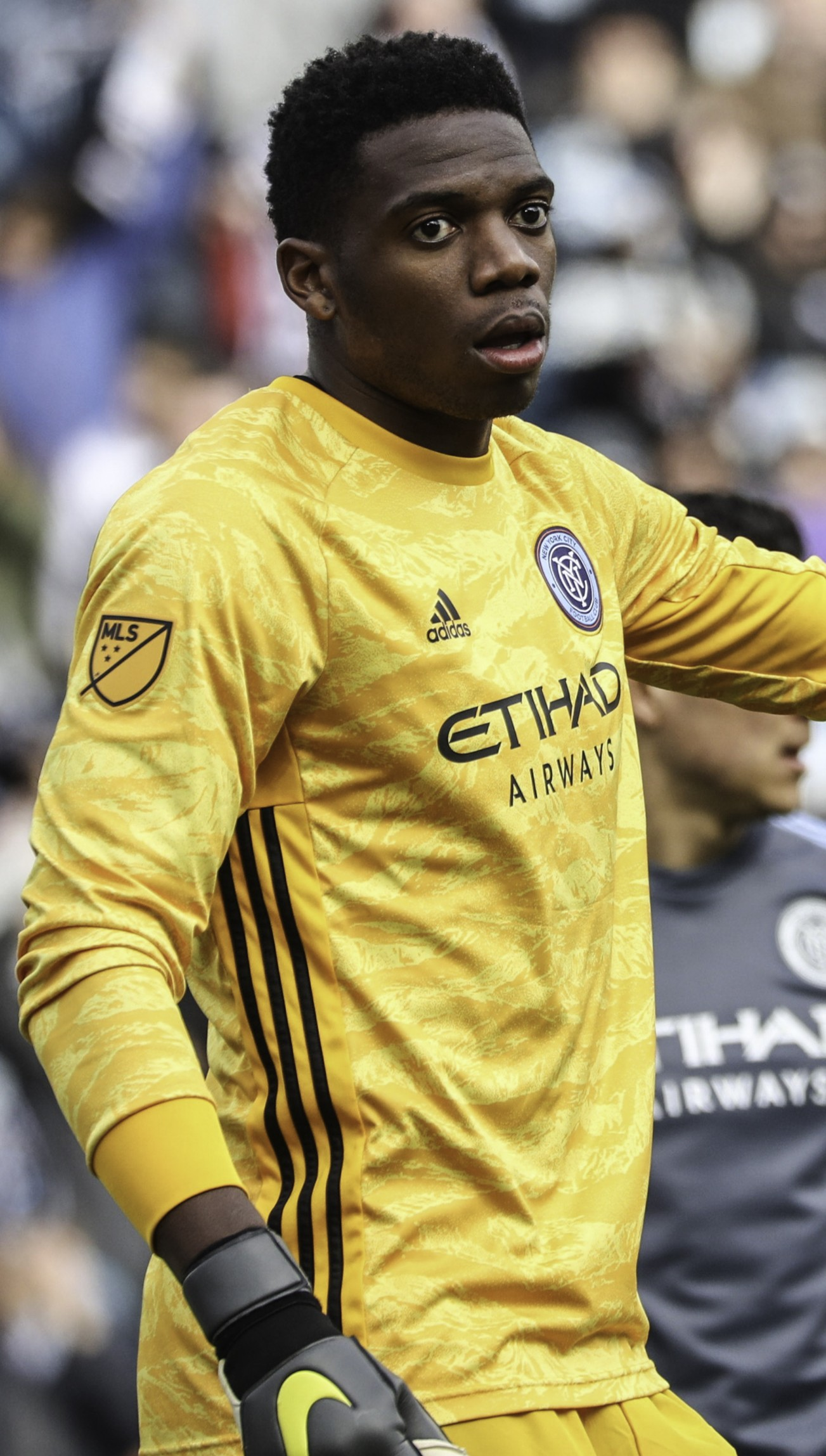
Sean Johnson in 2019

- Michelle Akers, soccer player; member of the U.S. championship teams of the 1991 FIFA Women's World Cup and 1999 FIFA Women's World Cup; named to the FIFA 100; FIFA's Woman Player of the Century
- Amy Allmann, goalkeeper for the 1991 FIFA Women's World Cup champion United States
- Joe Amico, defender
- Hadji Barry, forward for Orlando City SC
- Zak Boggs, forward or attacking midfielder
- Deshorn Brown, former MLS striker for D.C. United
- Lou Cioffi, former goalkeeper for the Orlando Lions
- Warren Creavalle, former MLS fullback for the Houston Dynamo, Toronto FC, and Philadelphia Union
- Jonathan Dean, MLS defender for Chicago Fire FC
- Kamal DeGregory, right-back who represented the Bahamas national team
- Winston DuBose, former NASL player for the Tampa Bay Rowdies and the Tulsa Roughnecks
- Chris Feigenbaum, midfielder who represented the Puerto Rico national team
- Kevan George, former MLS defensive midfielder for Columbus Crew SC
- Saku Heiskanen, right-back
- Cal Jennings, forward for the Tampa Bay Rowdies
- Sean Johnson, Major League Soccer goalkeeper for Toronto FC; represented Team USA in the 2022 FIFA World Cup
- Carrie Lawrence, defender for Orlando Pride
- Matt Luzunaris, former Major League Soccer striker for the San Jose Earthquakes, Orlando City SC, and Rochester New York FC
- Ryan McIntosh, former Major League Soccer goalkeeper for D.C. United
- Jeff Michaud, midfielder
- Thomas Liene Ness, midfielder
- Yannik Oettl, goalkeeper
- Louis Perez, midfielder
- Konya Plummer, professional soccer centre back for the Jamaica women's national football team
- Matias Pyssalo, midfielder
- Aline Reis, goalkeeper for the Brazil women's national football team
- Ryan Roushandel, former professional soccer midfielder and current assistant coach for San Antonio FC
- Anton Sealey, defender who represented the Bahamas national team and president of the Bahamas Football Association
- Nick Taylor, right winger who represents the Cambodia national team
- Eric Vasquez, former Major League Soccer midfielder for Columbus Crew and Miami FC
- Mauricio Villalobos, midfielder who represents the Costa Rica national team
- Gino Vivi, MLS midfielder for the LA Galaxy
- Romario Williams, forward for Colorado Springs Switchbacks FC
- Tom Wurdack, defender
- Kim Wyant, goalkeeper for the first United States women's national soccer team (1985)

==== Tennis ====
- Toby Crabel, former tennis player; three-time NCAA Division II All-American; later played doubles in the French Open
- Gabriel Décamps, professional tennis player; two-time ITA All-American and first UCF player to reach the NCAA singles quarterfinals
- Korey Lovett, former college tennis player; first UCF player to qualify for the NCAA singles and part of the program’s first All-American doubles team
- Teddy Tandjung, former professional tennis player and Davis Cup representative
- Veronica Widyadharma, former professional tennis player; two-time TAAC Player of the Year

==== Track and Field ====
- Anne-Marie Blaney, distance runner, and 2024 UCF Hall of Fame; competed at the 2019 IAAF World Cross Country Championships and multiple U.S. Olympic Trials
- Afia Charles, sprinter who represented Antigua and Barbuda at the 2012 Summer Olympics and the first UCF track and field Olympian; 2021 UCF Hall of Fame
- Beyoncé Defreitas, sprinter who competes for the British Virgin Islands
- Octavious Freeman, sprinter; medalist at the 2013 World Championships in Athletics
- Rayniah Jones, hurdler and sprinter; semi-finalist at the U.S. Olympic Trials in 2021 and 2024
- Aurieyall Scott, sprinter; gold medalist at the 2013 Summer Universiade
- Adaobi Tabugbo, hurdler; medalist at 2026 African Championships

=== Other ===
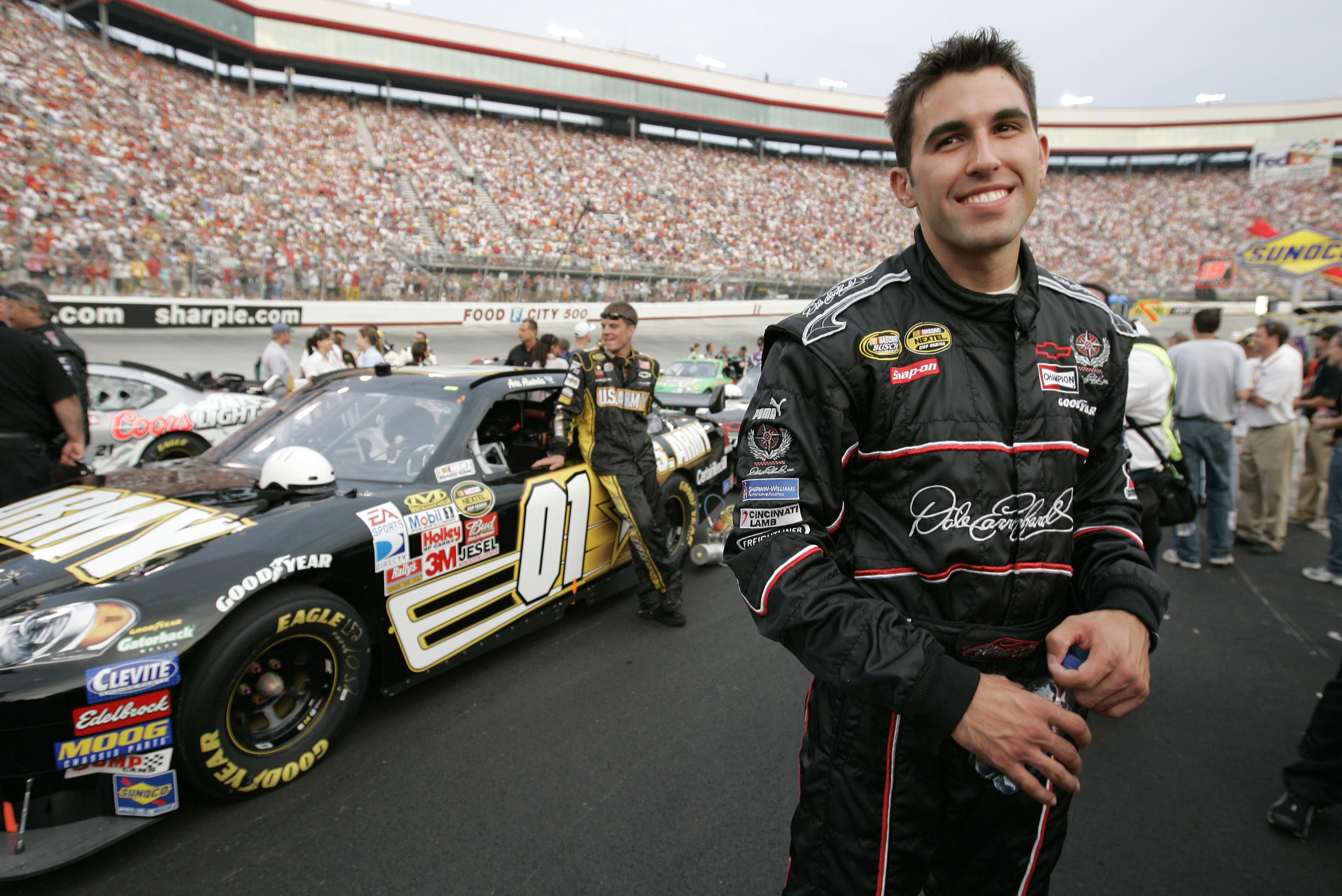
Aric Almirola

- Aric Almirola, NASCAR driver for Joe Gibbs Racing
- Phil Dalhausser, professional beach volleyball player with the AVP; co-winner of the gold medal at the 2008 Summer Olympics
- Shea Holbrook, professional race car driver in the Pirelli World Challenge
- Kristi Overton Johnson, former professional water skier and world record holder in women's slalom
- Scott Lagasse Jr., retired professional race car driver in the NASCAR Nationwide Series
- Cameron Lawrence, professional racing driver and two-time Trans-Am Series TA2 champion
- Mattie Rogers, professional weightlifter who competed in the 2020 Summer Olympics
- Kristen Thomas, professional rugby player who competed in the 2020 Summer Olympics
- Amber Torrealba, professional skimboarder and five-time VIC Women's World Champion
- Tyra Turner, professional beach volleyball player on the AVP Tour
- Tristan Wade, professional poker player; World Series of Poker bracelet winner at the 2011 World Series of Poker Europe; three money finishes at the World Poker Tour
- Chelsea Wolfe, freestyle BMX rider and alternate for the U.S. team at the 2020 Summer Olympics

== Honorary degree recipients ==
- Kareem Abdul-Jabbar, regarded as one of the greatest basketball players of all time; honorary Doctor of Public Service (2017)
- Muhammad bin Fahd Al Saud, governor of the Eastern Province of Saudi Arabia and Prince of the second generation of the Saudi Arabian Royal Family; honorary Doctor of Public Service (2017)
- Óscar Arias, 40th & 45th president of Costa Rica and Nobel Peace Prize laureate; honorary Doctor of Humane Letters (1999)
- Reubin Askew, 37th governor of Florida; honorary Doctor of Public Service (1999)
- Norman R. Augustine, former U.S. under secretary of the Army; honorary Doctor of Engineering Science (1995)
- Jim Bacchus, founding member and twice chairman of the Appellate Body of the World Trade Organization and former U.S. Representative from Florida; honorary Doctor of Public Services (2001)
- Nicolaas Bloembergen, physicist and Nobel laureate, recognized for his work in developing driving principles behind nonlinear optics for laser spectroscopy; honorary Doctor of Service (1996)
- Robert A. Bryan, former interim president of the University of Central Florida; honorary Doctor of Humane Letters (1992)
- Jeb Bush, former 43rd governor of Florida; honorary Doctor of Public Service (2018)
- Sven Caspersen, economist; honorary Doctor of Engineering Science (1988)
- Linda Chapin, politician, director of the Metropolitan Center for Regional Studies at the University of Central Florida; honorary Doctor of Public Service (1998)
- Bill Clinton, 42nd president of the United States; honorary Doctor of Humane Letters (2013)
- Trevor Colbourn, second President of the University of Central Florida; honorary Doctor of Humane Letters (1998)
- Michael M. Crow, 16th and current president of Arizona State University; honorary Doctor of Humane Letters (2013)
- Kurt H. Debus, first director of NASA's Launch Operations Center (later renamed the Kennedy Space Center); honorary Doctor of Engineering Science (1970)
- Richard DeVos, billionaire businessman, co-founder of Amway, owner of the Orlando Magic basketball team; honorary Doctor of Commercial Science (2002)
- Joseph Daniel Duffey, 14th director of the United States Information Agency; honorary Doctor of Humane Letters (1979)
- Buddy Dyer, 32nd mayor of Orlando; honorary Doctor of Public Service (2018)
- Harriet Elam-Thomas, 15th U.S. ambassador to Senegal and director of Diplomacy Program at UCF; honorary Doctor of Public Science (2005)
- Alan Ginsburg, real estate developer; founder of the CED Companies; honorary Doctor of Public Service (2014)
- Bob Graham, 38th governor of Florida and former United States senator from Florida; honorary Doctor of Public Service (1985)
- Albert Francis Hegenberger, major general in the United States Air Force; pioneering aviator; honorary Doctor of Engineering Science (1979)
- Roald Hoffmann, theoretical chemist, won the 1981 Nobel Prize in Chemistry; honorary Doctor of Science (1991)
- Teresa Jacobs, 4th mayor of Orange County, Florida; honorary Doctor of Public Service (2018)
- Bob Kahn, electrical engineer, first introduced the Transmission Control Protocol (TCP) and the Internet Protocol (IP), fundamental communication protocols of the Internet; honorary Doctor of Science (2002)
- Richard M. Karp, computer scientist and computational theorist; honorary Doctor of Science (2001)
- Howard Lance, businessman and industrial engineer; president and chief executive officer of MacDonald, Dettwiler and Associates; honorary Doctor of Science (2009)
- Charles N. Millican, first president of the University of Central Florida; honorary Doctor of Laws (1989)
- James C. Robinson, health economist; honorary Doctor of Public Service (1988)
- Lee R. Scherer, director of NASA's John F. Kennedy Space Center (KSC) 1975–1979; honorary Doctor of Engineering Science (1979)
- William C. Schwartz, civic leader in Central Florida and pioneer in the laser industry; honorary Doctor of Engineering Science (1985)
- Thaddeus Seymour, academician; honorary Doctor of Letters (1990)
- Isaac Bashevis Singer, Nobel Prize for Literature recipient; honorary Doctor of Letters (1986)
- John Skipper, television executive, current executive chairman of DAZN Group, and former president of ESPN; honorary Doctor of Humane Letters (2016)
- Charles H. Townes, physicist, Nobel Prize in Physics recipient; honorary Doctor of Science (2007)
- Joseph F. Traub, computer scientist; honorary Doctor of Science (2001)
- Desmond Tutu, South African Anglican bishop and theologian and Nobel Peace Prize laureate; honorary Doctor of Humane Letters (1999)
- Aníbal Acevedo Vilá, former governor of Puerto Rico; honorary Doctor of Public Science (2006)
- LeRoy T. Walker, track field coach and the first black president of the United States Olympic Committee; honorary Doctor of Public Services (2001)
- Elie Wiesel, writer, professor, political activist, Nobel laureate, and Holocaust survivor; honorary Doctor of Letters (1988)
- John Young, NASA astronaut; honorary Doctorate of Applied Science (1970)
- Lotfi A. Zadeh, mathematician, computer scientist, electrical engineer, artificial intelligence researcher; honorary Doctor of Science (2000)
