= Cynthia Young =

Cynthia Young may refer to:

- Cynthia A. Young (born 1969), American scholar of African American studies and English
- Cynthia Y. Young, American applied mathematician, textbook author, and academic administrator
