= Melissa Jones =

Melissa Jones may refer to:

- Melissa Jones (NASA), NASA official
- Melissa Jones (writer), English novelist
