= Rockledge High School =

Public high school in Rockledge, Florida, United States

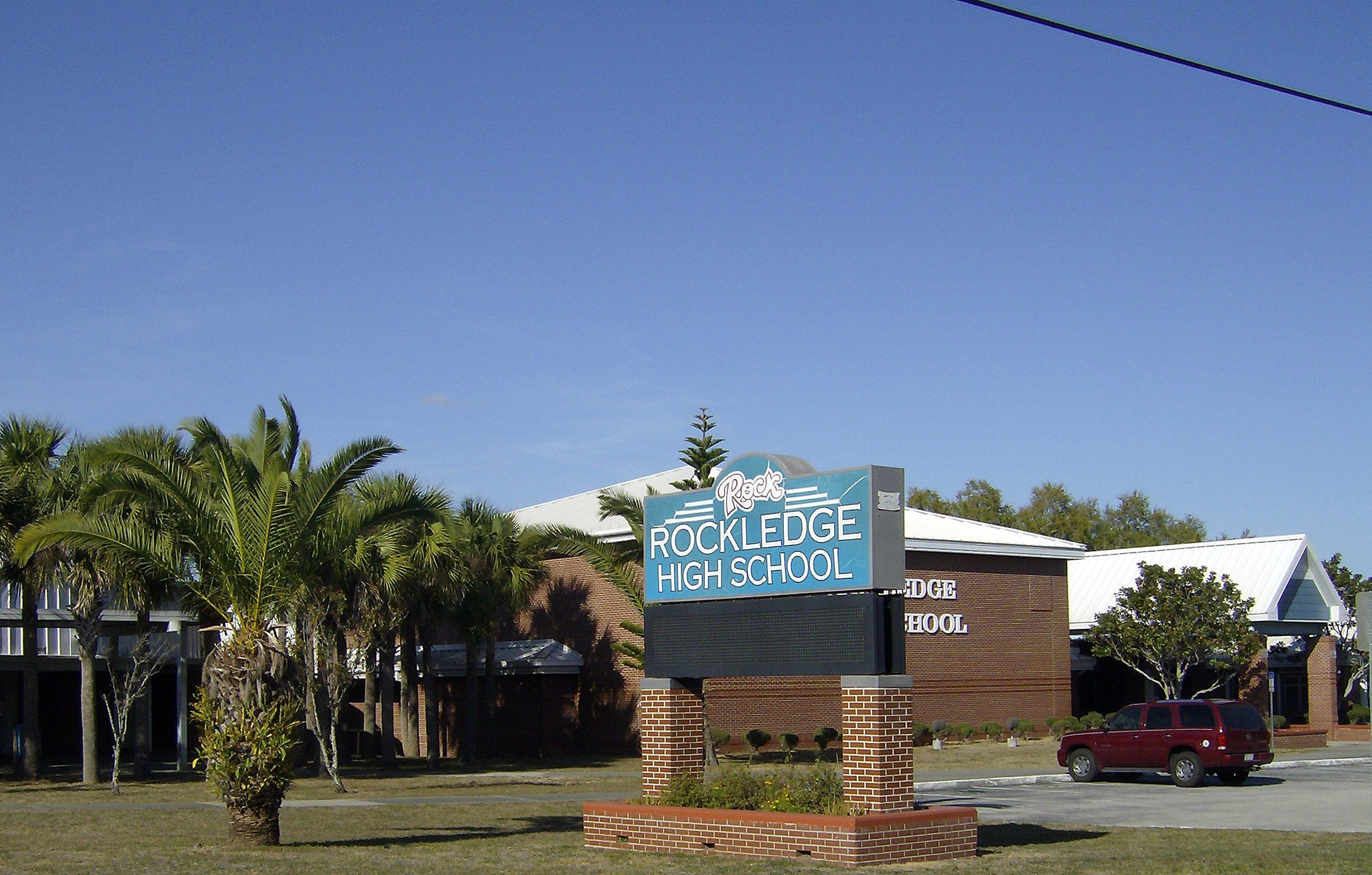

Location
- 220 Raider Road; Rockledge, Florida 32955; United States; 28°20′26.8″N 80°43′27.7″W

Information
- Type: Public high school
- Established: 1970 as Rockledge High, succeeding the former Cocoa High
- School district: Brevard Public Schools
- Principal: Peter “Andy” Papczynski
- Teaching staff: 74.80 (FTE)
- Grades: 9–12
- Enrollment: 1,547 (2023–2024)
- Student to teacher ratio: 20.68
- Colors: Columbia blue and silver
- Mascot: Raiders
- Website: Rockledge High School Official Website

Rockledge High School is located in Rockledge, Florida, United States, and is part of the Brevard Public Schools District.

== History ==
Rockledge High School was founded in 1970 on the site formerly named Cocoa High School.

== Academics ==
=== AICE Program ===
In 2005, Rockledge High School became the first in the school district to offer the Advanced International Certificate of Education (AICE). In 2007, Rockledge was designated an International Fellowship Center, a special recognition only available to schools with an AICE program, making it only the 19th in the world and the 5th in the U.S. to gain this title.

== Athletics ==
In 2009, the estimated income to fund sports at the school was $144,502, equivalent to $312 per athlete. Its primary sports rival is Cocoa High School.

=== American football ===
In 2013, Rockledge alumnus and NFL player Laurent Robinson donated 15 Shockbox concussion sensors to the school. Rockledge was the first high school in Florida to use such technology to monitor its players, which will occur throughout the 2013–14 season in collaboration with researchers from the University of South Florida.

The school won the state championship in 3A football in 2001 and 2002.

== Alumni ==
- Eric Adler - baseball pitcher in the Chicago White Sox organization
- Jashaun Corbin – professional American football player
- Chris Laskowski – professional American football player
- Mel Mitchell – professional American football player
- Drew Parrish – baseball player
- Laurent Robinson 2003 – professional American football player
- Raheim Sanders (2021) – American football player
- Andrea Zuvich 2003 – historian and author.
