= Eric Adler =

American baseball player (born 2000)

Free agent
- Pitcher
- Born: October 12, 2000 (age 25); Melbourne, Florida, U.S.
- Bats: Right Throws: Right
- Stats at Baseball Reference

Eric Michael Adler (born October 12, 2000) is an American professional baseball pitcher who is a free agent.

== Amateur career ==
Adler attended Rockledge High School in Rockledge, Florida, and played college baseball at Wake Forest University. During the summer of 2021, he played in the Cape Cod Baseball League for the Bourne Braves.

== Professional career ==
Adler was selected by the Chicago White Sox in the sixth round of the 2022 Major League Baseball draft and signed with the team.

Adler made his professional debut with the Arizona League White Sox and also played with the Kannapolis Cannon Ballers, appearing in six games between both teams. He split the 2023 season between Kannapolis and the Winston-Salem Dash; over 28 relief appearances for the season, Adler posted a 2–0 record with a 2.87 ERA and 42 strikeouts. He returned to Winston-Salem to open the 2024 season and was promoted to the Birmingham Barons in early May, with whom he ended the season. Over forty relief appearances between the two teams, Adler went 3–2 with a 3.15 ERA and 52 strikeouts over forty innings. After the season, he was selected to play in the Arizona Fall League for the Glendale Desert Dogs. Adler opened the 2025 season with the Charlotte Knights before he was reassigned to Birmingham; he also spent time on the development list. Across 34 appearances between both teams, Adler posted a 3–5 record, a 5.89 ERA, 33 strikeouts and 31 walks over 36 2/3 innings.

Adler struggled to open the 2026 season and gave up 19 earned runs across 7 1/3 innings with Birmingham. On June 2, 2026, Adler was released by the White Sox.
