= Sean Donahue =

American lawyer and government official

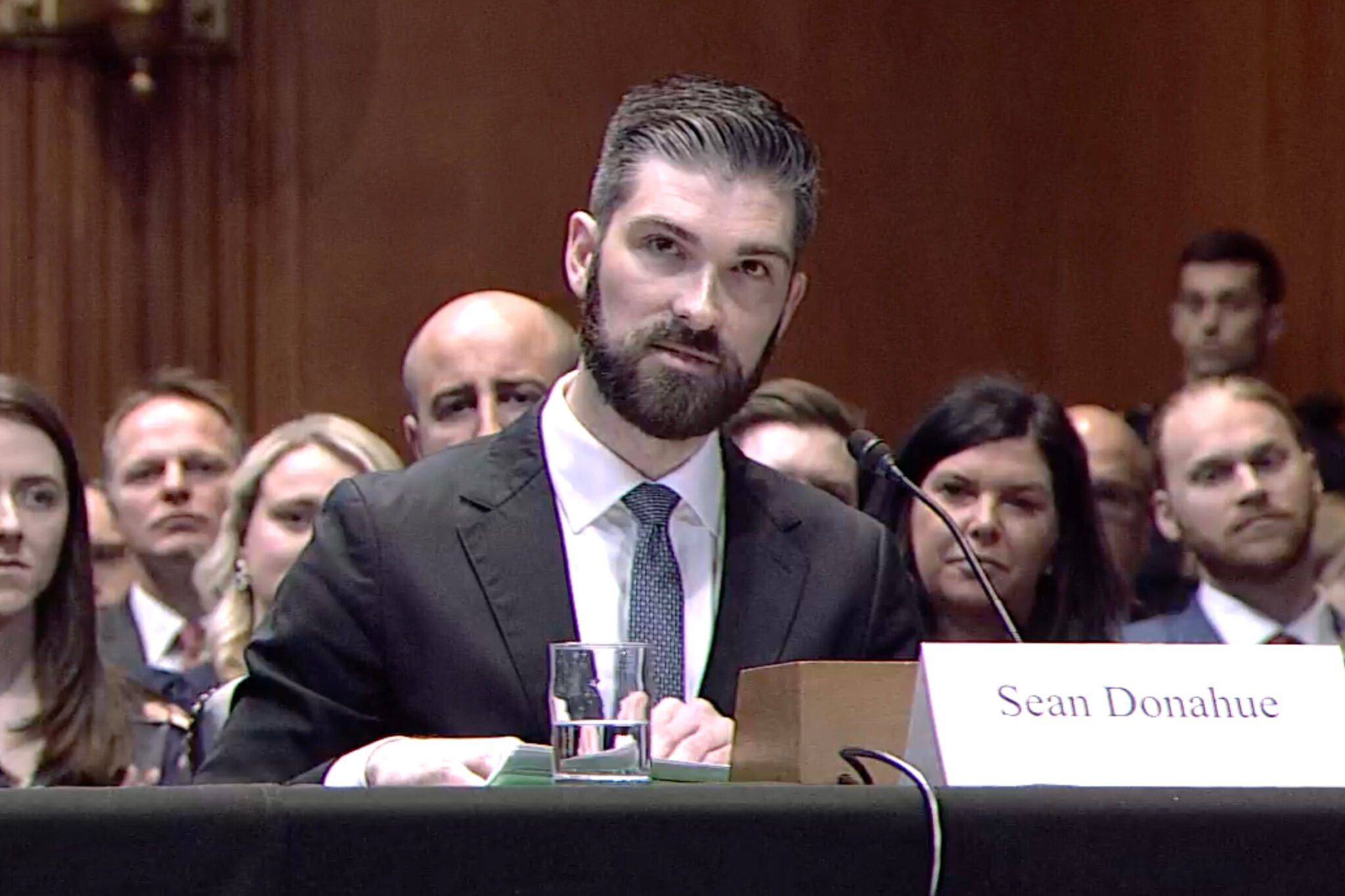
- Sean Donahue speaking to the Senate Environment and Public Works Committee during his confirmation hearing on March 26th, 2025

General Counsel of the United States Environmental Protection Agency
- Incumbent
- Assumed office May 22, 2025
- President: Donald Trump
- Preceded by: Jeffrey Prieto

Personal details
- Party: Republican
- Education: University of Central Florida (BS); Florida State University (JD)

Sean Michael Donahue is an American lawyer and government official who has served as general counsel of the United States Environmental Protection Agency (EPA) since May 22, 2025. He was nominated by President Donald Trump and confirmed by the United States Senate in a 51–46 vote.

== Early life and education ==
Donahue was raised on the Space Coast of central Florida. He earned a Bachelor of Science in legal studies from the University of Central Florida and a Juris Doctor from the Florida State University College of Law.

== Career ==
=== Private sector ===
After law school, Donahue joined Phillips Lytle LLP in Buffalo, New York, as an associate in its Land, Environment & Energy practice group. He later served as director of regulatory affairs for Norbut Solar Farms, a Rochester-area solar developer.

=== Trump administration ===
During President Trump’s first term, Donahue held non-legal posts in EPA’s land and public-records offices.

== Nomination and confirmation ==
On February 11, 2025, Trump sent Donahue’s nomination to the Senate to serve as an assistant administrator and general counsel of the EPA. The Senate Environment and Public Works Committee held a confirmation hearing on March 26, 2025, at which Democrats pressed Donahue on his limited courtroom experience.

The committee advanced the nomination on April 9, 2025, along party lines. Cloture was invoked on May 14, and the full Senate confirmed Donahue on May 15, 2025, by a 51–46 vote with all present Republicans in favor and all present Democrats opposed.

== Criticism ==
=== Questions about legal experience ===
Much of the opposition to Donahue has focused on his limited courtroom background. During his 2025 confirmation hearing he acknowledged that, in more than a decade since law school, he had never taken a deposition, argued a motion or drafted a legal pleading — all duties that are routine for junior litigators. Asked by Senator Sheldon Whitehouse whether he knew the definition of a motion in limine, Donahue replied, “I do, vaguely, yes,” prompting Whitehouse to remark that the Donahue "may be the most unfit nominee ever for the role of any federal agency’s general counsel,” and that he “would have trouble getting an entry-level legal position in any of our offices.”

Donahue further testified that his only private-practice experience was an 18-month stint at the Buffalo firm Phillips Lytle—employment that ended, by his own account, when the firm fired him.

=== Need for litigation expertise ===
Former EPA general counsels from both parties argued that the post requires seasoned litigators who can defend regulations in court. C. Scott Fulton, who held the job under President Obama, said the general counsel “is deeply influential in the direction, construction and defense of all EPA regulatory actions,” adding that Donahue’s inexperience could hamper the administration’s agenda. Avi Garbow, also an Obama-era GC, stressed that “this is not merely an advisory role … it will require litigation chops and an understanding of how regulatory and policy decisions can best be defended in courts of law.”

=== Conflict-of-interest concerns ===
During the March 2025 hearing Donahue acknowledged that his partner, Trent Morse, was then serving as deputy director of the White House Presidential Personnel Office, the office that vets all political appointees. Democrats said the relationship created, at minimum, the appearance of a conflict, because Morse’s staff had helped screen Donahue’s application; the administration countered that Morse had recused himself “from anything related to Sean Donahue.”

=== Impact on environmental policy ===
Environmental lawyers and advocacy groups warned that seating an untested attorney as the agency’s top lawyer could accelerate efforts to roll back environmental safeguards, shrink the EPA’s workforce and restructure key programs, because courtroom defeats would delay or deter new rules. They argued that Donahue’s background as a political advisor rather than a litigator, signals a preference for deregulation over robust legal defense of existing statutes such as the Clean Air Act and Clean Water Act.

=== Senate Democrats’ assessment ===
At the committee vote on April 9, 2025, every Democrat opposed the nomination. Whitehouse summed up their view by calling Donahue “the most unfit nominee ever for the role of any federal agency’s general counsel,” and predicted that his “manifest incompetence” would ultimately aid opponents of the administration’s environmental agenda.

== See also ==
- Environmental policy of the second Donald Trump administration
- List of positions filled by presidential appointment with Senate confirmation
