= Chris Feigenbaum =

Puerto Rican footballer

Personal information
- Full name: Christopher Lucas Feigenbaum
- Date of birth: November 4, 1989 (age 36)
- Place of birth: Monterey, California, U.S.
- Height: 1.78 m (5 ft 10 in)
- Position: Midfielder

Youth career
- AFC Lightning Team
- Atlanta Silverbacks

College career
Years	Team	Apps	(Gls)
2008–2011	UCF Knights	43	(2)

International career
- Puerto Rico U20
2010	Puerto Rico	6	(0)

Christopher Lucas Feigenbaum (born November 4, 1989) is a former footballer who played as a midfielder. Born in he United States, played for the Puerto Rico national team.

== Career ==
Born in Monterey, California and raised in Fayetteville, Georgia, Feigenbaum played at youth level for AFC Lightning Team and Atlanta Silverbacks, before playing college soccer for UCF Knights.

He played for Puerto Rico at under-20 level, before earning six caps for the senior team.

After graduating from UCF in business, he began working in business management.
