= Michelle Amos =

American electronics design engineer

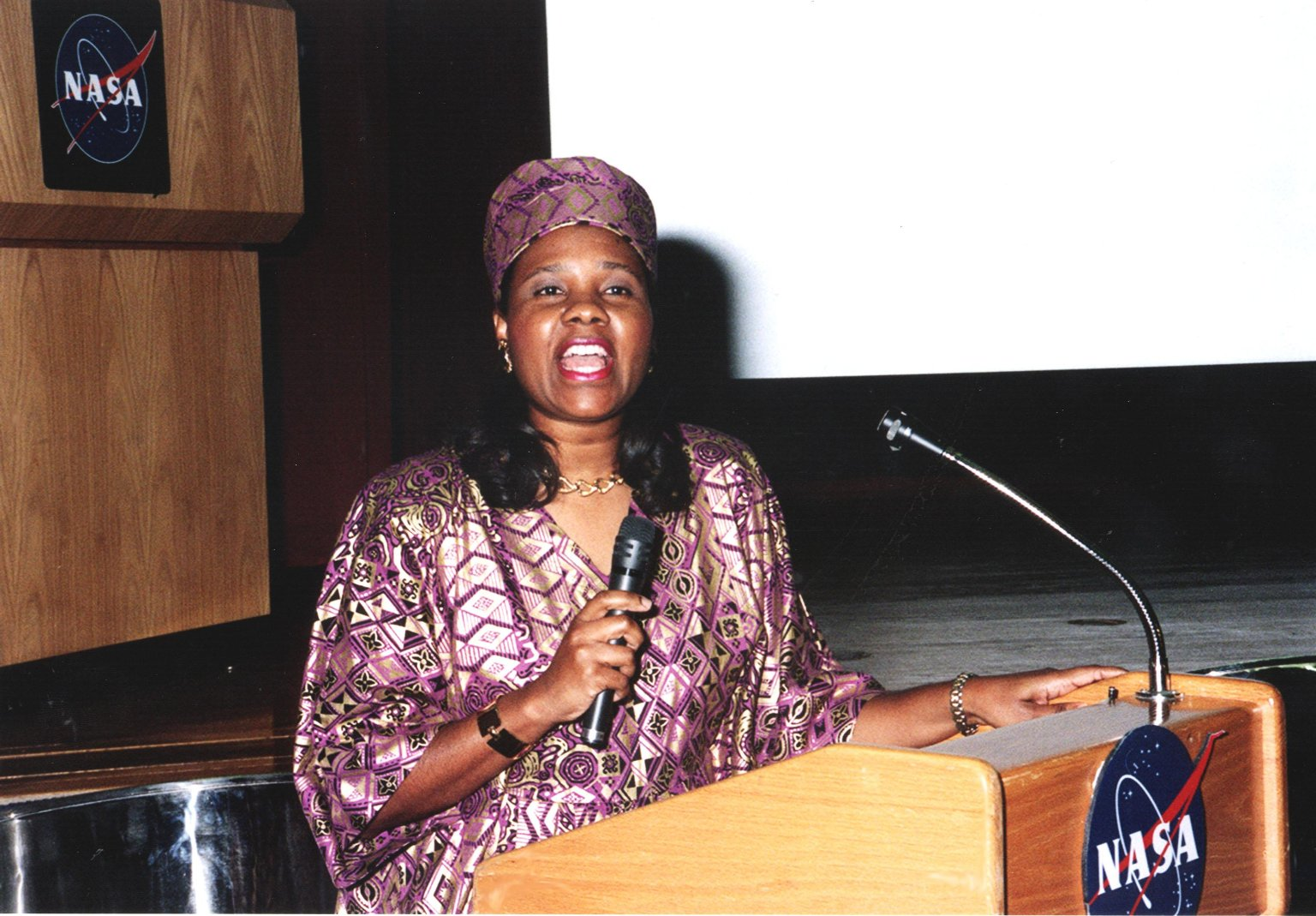
- Michelle Amos in 2004
- Born: Baker, Louisiana
- Education: Southern University and A&M College (BS); University of Central Florida (MS)
- Occupation: Electrical engineer

Michelle Amos is an electronics design engineer at NASA's John F. Kennedy Space Center. Amos joined NASA in 1990 as an electronics design engineer and stayed with NASA for 30 years. Amos was also a systems engineer for Deep Space Logistics.

== Early life ==
Amos was her parents tenth child.

== Education ==
Amos graduated from Southern University and A&M College in 1989 with a Bachelor of Science in electrical engineering. In 2005, she earned a Master of Science in engineering management from the University of Central Florida.

== Career ==
In 2006, Amos was co-chair of the NASA Advanced Range Technology Working Group. Amos designs electrical systems and control equipment in at the Kennedy Space Center's Advanced Technology Development Center and worked on a support team for the International Space Station configuring and documenting its electrical configurations. She was the project manager lead for the shuttle transition and retirement activities. She was a member of the team that developed the Mars 2020 rover at JPL, and worked with the Artemis program, a crewed Moon mission, until retiring in 2020.

She was the chairperson of NASA's Black Employee Strategy Team. She worked on Perseverance, the Mars 2020 rover, as a system engineer.

In October 2024, Amos delivered a keynote at BYU-Idaho titled ‘Light of the World’, discussing her role as systems engineer on NASA’s Artemis Moon-logistics team.

== Honors ==
In 2002 she won an All Star Award at NASA's Women of Color Government and Defense Technology Awards Conference. In 2003, she received the KSC Strategic Leadership Award. In 2004, she was awarded the Kennedy Space Center Federal Women's Program PRISM Award for her mentorship of young girls in science and engeneering.

== Personal life ==
Amos was born and raised on a farm in Baton Rouge, Louisiana, to Dunk and Dorothy Wright, one of ten children. She was raised Baptist but her family converted to being a member of the Church of Jesus Christ of Latter-day Saints (LDS Church) in 1979. Her belief in god has been strengthened by her knowledge pertaining to science. She and her husband, John D. Amos, have three children and live in Oviedo, Florida. In 2020, Amos and her husband began a three-year term leading the Louisiana Baton Rouge Mission of the LDS Church. The pair were called to the mission shortly after Amos was working on the Mars 2020 Rover. They returned to watch the landing in person and shared it online with over 200 missionaries.

Following their time as mission leaders which ended in 2023, John Amos was called as an area seventy of the Church of Jesus Christ of Latter-day Saints in March 2023. In April 2025 John Amos was called as a general authority seventy of the Church.
