= Jen Glantz =

Entrepreneur

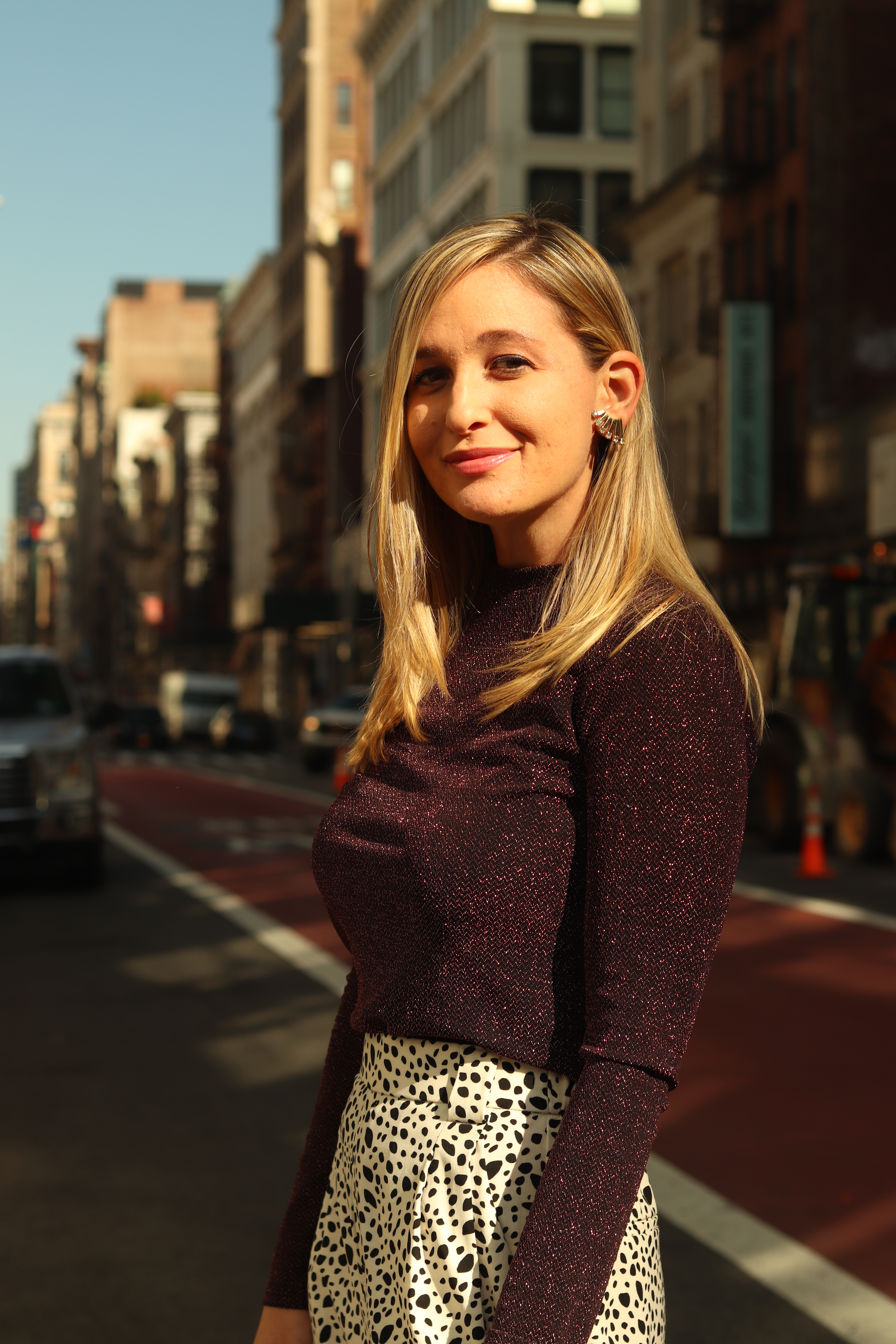
- Jen Glantz
- Born: April 1, 1988 (age 38); Deerfield Beach, Florida, U.S.
- Education: University of Central Florida (BA)
- Occupations: Author, Entrepreneur
- Partner: Adam Kossoff

Jen Glantz (born April 1, 1988) is an American entrepreneur and author best known for founding the business Bridesmaid for Hire.

== Early life and education ==
Glantz was born in Deerfield Beach, Florida on April 1, 1988. She grew up in Boca Raton, Florida with her parents and older brother.

Glantz graduated in 2010 from the University of Central Florida with a bachelor of arts in journalism and English creative writing.

== Career ==
Glantz moved to New York City and worked for a tech startup as a copywriter. In 2014, she offered her services as a bridesmaid for hire in Craigslist, a classified advertisement website. This led to guest TV appearances on The Today Show, Good Morning America, CNN and Fox News. She left her copywriting job and worked full time as the CEO of her Bridesmaid for Hire business, training other women to be part-time bridesmaids.

Glantz has authored several books including All My Friends are Engaged in which she talks about the difficulties she had with dating and Always a Bridesmaid for Hire in which she describes moving to New York and the path she took to entrepreneurship. After getting engaged herself, she created an interactive book “Finally the Bride.” She has contributed articles to The Huffington Post, Business Insider, Yahoo, The New York Times, Brides, Bustle, Cosmopolitan, Elle, Glamour, PopSugar, Refinery29, and Today.com. In 2018, she started a podcast “You’re Not Getting Any Younger”.

Glantz also works as a public speaker and career coach.

== Personal life ==
In 2019, she got engaged to Adam Kossoff.

== Works ==
- Glantz, Jen (2015). All my friends are engaged. New York, NY: Thought Catalog Books. ISBN 9780692527153.
- Glantz, Jen (2017). Always a bridesmaid (for hire). New York, NY: Simon & Schuster. ISBN 9781508228769.
