= Lee Scherer =

American aeronautical engineer and director

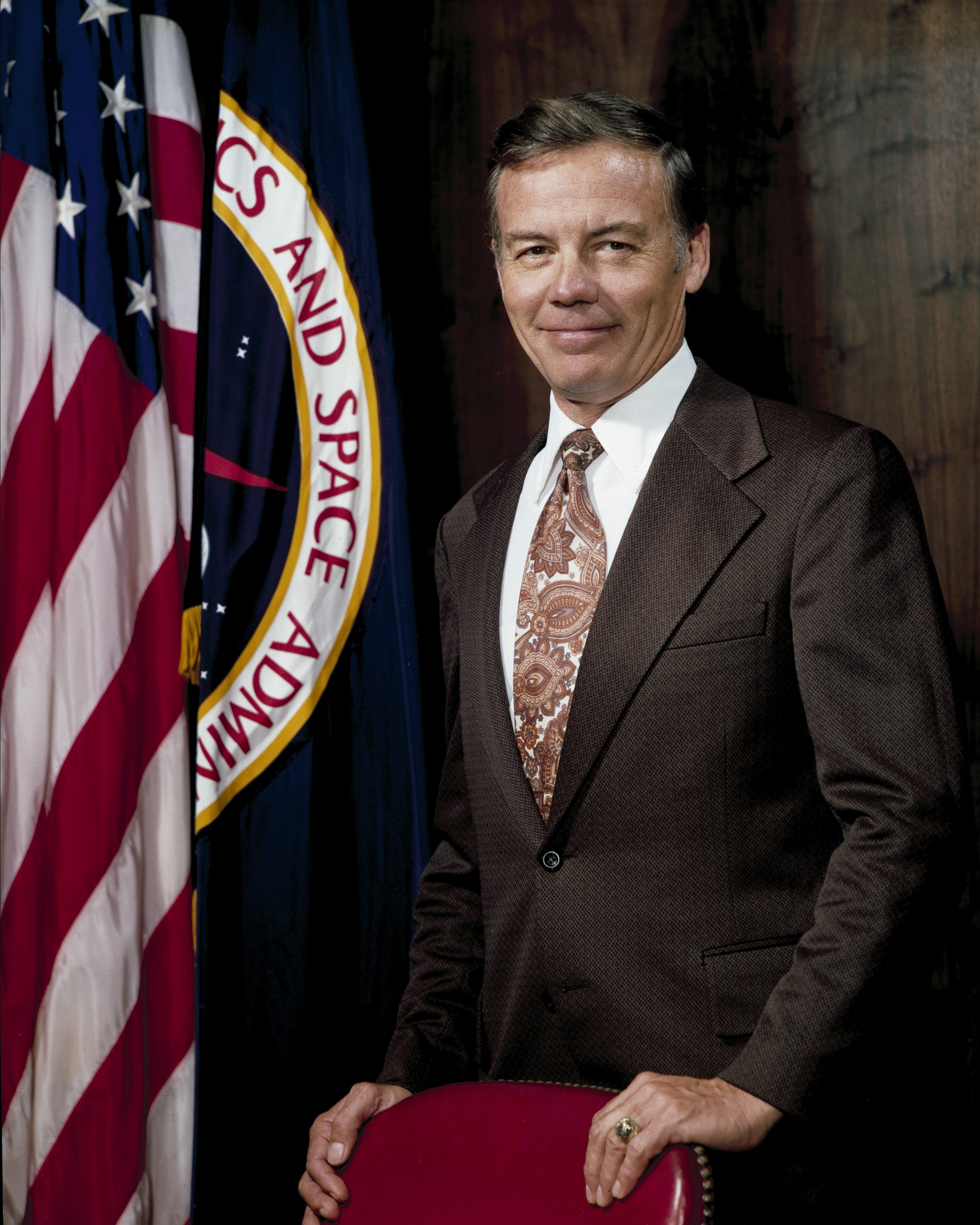

Director of the Kennedy Space Center
- In office January 19, 1975 – September 2, 1979
- President: Jimmy Carter; Gerald Ford

Director of the Dryden Flight Research Center
- In office 1971–1975
- President: Gerald Ford; Richard Nixon

Personal details
- Born: September 20, 1919 Charleston, SC
- Died: May 7, 2011 (aged 91) San Diego, CA
- Education: U.S. Naval Academy; California Institute of Technology; University of Central Florida
- Profession: Engineer

Military service
- Allegiance: United States
- Branch/service: United States Navy
- Years of service: 1939–1964
- Rank: Captain
- Battles/wars: World War II

Lee R. Scherer (September 20, 1919 – May 7, 2011) was an American aeronautical engineer and director of NASA's John F. Kennedy Space Center (KSC) from January 19, 1975 to September 2, 1979. Prior to his appointment as KSC director, Scherer was director of NASA's Flight Research Center, Edwards, California, responsible for the conduct of advanced aeronautical flight research.

== Biography ==
A 1942 honors graduate of the U.S. Naval Academy, where he received a bachelor of science degree in Naval Science, Scherer's operational experience in the Navy included assignments as a fighter pilot operating from various aircraft carriers. Prior to entering the Naval Academy, he attended the University of Kentucky.

He was awarded a bachelor of science degree in aeronautical engineering from the U.S. Naval Postgraduate School in 1949, and a professional degree (aeronautical engineer) from the California Institute of Technology in 1950. He was awarded a doctorate degree in engineering science from the University of Central Florida in 1979.

From 1950 to 1953, he was flying qualities project officer for the Navy Bureau of Aeronautics, responsible for establishing stability and control specifications for fixed wing aircraft and helicopters, and for approval of flight tests to meet these objectives prior to acceptance by the Navy.

From 1953 to 1956, he held several assignments, both in Washington, D.C., and on the staff of commander, Fleet Air Hawaii.

He was special assistant to the assistant secretary of the Navy for research and development from 1956 through 1959, the period when Vanguard, Polaris, and ballistic missile nuclear submarines were developed.

He served as technical assistant to the team responsible for the establishment of the Anti-Submarine Warfare Research Center for NATO in La Spezia, Italy from 1959 to 1962. In 1962 he was head of the Aircraft Production Branch, responsible for planning, management and cost control in production of new Navy aircraft.

In 1962, on assignment from the Navy to NASA Headquarters, he was program manager for Lunar Orbiter, an uncrewed spacecraft that photographed the Moon from low lunar orbit to provide data for the selection of Apollo landing sites. All five spacecraft performed their missions successfully. He retired from the Navy with the rank of captain in 1964, following 25 years of service, and remained in NASA as director of lunar programs for the Office of Space Sciences.

From 1967 to 1971, Scherer was director of the Apollo Lunar Exploration Office, responsible for scientific aspects of lunar exploration. He held this position during the first five lunar missions.

Scherer received the NASA Exceptional Service Medal in 1967, the NASA Exceptional Scientific Achievement Medal in 1969, and the NASA Distinguished Service Medal in 1974. He received the 1976–77 General Lewis H. Brereton Award, presented annually by the Air Force Association (Florida) to the Florida civilian making the greatest contribution to aerospace during the year.

Scherer directed Kennedy Space Center during the Apollo Soyuz Test Project—a joint crewed space venture with the Soviet Union in 1975—and also during the early buildup for the Space Shuttle program. Scherer left KSC on September 2, 1979 to assume the post of associate administrator for external relations at NASA Headquarters.

Scherer later moved to San Diego, California and served as a senior executive with General Dynamics Commercial Services Group.
