= Uma Gupta =

Uma G. Gupta
- Born: India
- Education: Stella Maris College (BS); University of Central Florida (MBA, PhD)
- Known for: Speaker researcher and writer
- Notable work: Theory and applications of the Delphi technique: A bibliography (1975–1994); Outsourcing the IS function: Is it necessary for your organization?

Uma G. Gupta is an Indian American academic who as of 2026 is Director of Business Analytics and Associate Professor at the University of South Carolina, Upstate. She is also a motivational speaker and a business consultant.

From 2003 to 2006, she was the President of Alfred State College, State University of New York.

She was awarded a Fulbright Award in 2012 to the University of Malta in Malta and the Fulbright Canada Distinguished Research Chair at Carleton University in Ottawa, Canada from 2025 to 2026.

== Early life and education ==
Gupta was born in Chennai, India.

She earned her BS and MS in Mathematics from Stella Maris College in India in 1977 and 1979. She earned an MBA in 1985 and a PhD in 1991 in industrial engineering from the University of Central Florida.

== Career ==
After serving as a professor at the University of Central Florida and East Carolina University, in 1997, she became the Endowed Chair of IT at the Creighton University for three years. She served as the dean of the College of Technology at the University of Houston from 2000 to 2003 before moving to the State University of New York where she was President of Alfred State College from 2003 to 2006. From 2007 to 2019 she was a Professor of Management at Buffalo State University.

In 2009 she founded STEM-SMART, a NGO that tries to engage students in STEM careers on the United States.

In 2012 she won a Fulbright Award to teach and research in Malta and she was awarded the Fulbright Canada Distinguished Research Chair at Carleton University in Ottawa, Canada from 2025 to 2026.

Gupta was awarded the Top Ten Influential Women in Technology in Houston, Texas, and was nominated again for this award in 2012 in Rochester, New York.

=== Writing ===
Gupta has written about sixty research journal articles with her article “Theory and applications of the Delphi technique: A bibliography (1975–1994)” reaching over 420 citations. It investigates the Delphi Technique or Delphi Method, a forecasting method that was developed on the first years of the Cold War. This work surveys the literature from 1975 to 1994 for the methodology and applications on the Delphi method. The second work is Outsourcing the IS function: Is it necessary for your organization? is a research on outsourcing the IS function on companies, providing help to companies trying to decide if outsourcing is a viable option or not.

She has written two textbooks on information technology: Information Systems: Success in the 21st Century and Management and Information Systems: A Managerial Perspective.
