= Christina C. C. Willis =

American laser scientist

- Education: Wellesley College; University of Central Florida
- Scientific career
- Workplaces: National Institute of Standards and Technology
- Thesis: Ytterbium-doped Fiber-seeded Thin-disk Master Oscillator Power Amplifier Laser System (2013)

Christina C. C. Willis is an American laser scientist who works in optics and high-power laser development. She is involved with policy, outreach and volunteering. Willis is a board member of SPIE, the international society of optics and photonics. As of January 2019, she completed an 18-month expedition around the world. She is serving as an Arthur H. Guenther Congressional Fellowship from 2019 to 2020. In January 2020, she published the book Sustainable Networking for Scientists and Engineers, which addresses networking in a holistic sense, encouraging readers to treat professional support as a resource that is sustained by contributing more than you can take.

== Education and early career ==
Willis attended York School. She studied at Wellesley College, receiving the BA in physics in June 2006. During the summer, she was an undergraduate research fellow at the National Institute of Standards and Technology (NIST) in Gaithersburg, Maryland, where she designed and constructed a piezo-actuated device for on-demand production of ultra-small (Femtolitre) water droplets for use in optical trapping and analytical chemistry experiments. After graduating from Wellesley College, Willis worked as an assistant engineer at the National Metrological Institute of Japan, Time and Frequency Division, Tsukuba, Japan. Here, she authored and illustrated an end-user assembly and calibration manual for a 50+ part iodine-stabilized helium neon laser, which had been designed for metrological applications and used as the international length standard. In September 2009, she earned a Master's degree in Optics from the College of Optics and Photonics (CREOL) at the University of Central Florida, and in August 2013, she earned a Ph.D. in Optics from CREOL. For her graduate studies at CREOL, Willis performed applied research with high power thulium fiber lasers, and ytterbium fiber and thin disk lasers in ns-pulsed and cw temporal regimes. She developed a wavefront sensing technique for assessing thermal distortions in ceramic gain media, and completed dissertation work on a hybrid-architecture, high-energy laser system with pulse temporal tailoring capability. Her work was supported by a United States Department of Defense Graduate Fellowship. She joined Boeing-SVS in Albuquerque, New Mexico, where she worked as an intern on a research team tasked with testing and implementation of a 1 μm ytterbium multi-kW thin-disk laser system for military applications.

== Career ==
Willis worked as an optics and laser scientist at Vision Engineering Solutions in Orlando, Florida where her activities focussed on laser-based tracking and imaging systems for aerospace applications. From 2014 Willis worked as a laser scientist at Fibertek Inc. in Herndon, Virginia. Here she performed design, modelling, assembly, and testing of solid state laser resonators, amplifiers, and non-linear conversion systems for LIDAR applications, resulting in publications and follow-on programs. She also developed diagnostic troubleshooting procedures, delivered internal and external technical presentations, and acted as part of the strategic planning team for their New Technology Initiative. In 2017, Willis travelled round the world.

=== Science advocacy ===
Willis has advocated for science funding, women in STEM, and related government policy, including meetings with United States Congressional representatives and staff. She authored “The underrepresentation of women in STEM: Do stereotypes play a role", May 2016 issue of the Electro Optics She is serving as an Arthur H. Guenther Congressional Fellowship from 2019 to 2020.
