= Taylor Gerring =

American cryptocurrency entrepreneur

- Born: Stuart, Florida
- Education: Indian River State College (AA); University of Central Florida (BSBA)
- Known for: Director of Technology & Co-founder of Ethereum
- Scientific career
- Fields: digital currencies

Taylor Gerring is an American entrepreneur who is a co-founding member of the blockchain platform Ethereum (formerly Etherium Foundation), and served on the board. Gerring previously held the positions of vice president of engineering for Hive Bitcoin Wallet and later as executive director of The Blockchain Institute.

In 2021, he bought a Non-fungible token (NFT) of a Mega Mutant Serum NFT for Over $3 million.

Gerring is a supporter of his alma mater's UCF Knights athletics. In February 2024, Gerring donated over $5.5 million to UCF Knights football team for its new football facility which will be named after him.
