= Teddy Blass =

- Born: April 16, 1984 (age 40)
- Origin: Dallas, Texas
- Genres: Film scores,
- Occupation(s): Composer, Music Producer, Sound Designer, Songwriter
- Instrument(s): French Horn, Keyboards
- Years active: 2008-Present
- Website: http://www.teddyblasss.com

Teddy Blass (born April 16, 1984 in Dallas) is an American film composer and record producer.

== Biography ==
Teddy Blass was born in Dallas, Texas. He studied music throughout his youth, and went on to receive degrees in Music Production and Digital Media. He graduated from the University of Central Florida in 2008. Blass started off in the music business as an in-house producer for FlatFoot Records in Orlando, Florida. He co-produced EP albums for bands such as Early Next Year and Kingsbury. He also worked as an assistant engineer on Pretty Ugly's debut album Walk a Mile in My Shoes. Blass also served as the Vice President of Graphics at the label for a short period of time.

In 2009, Teddy Blass did a remix for Ace of Base. Later that year he started writing music for a number of short films, including the micro-short Confession, which was based on the short story At Confession by Harvey Stanbrough. The next year, Teddy Blass and Grammy nominee Justin Boller started a production team together. Their first project was creating the Playoffs Theme Song for the Orlando Magic. In 2011, Blass earned a nomination for the Golden Tripod Award for Best Soundtrack for his score to the film FunMachine. He won and accepted that award in June at the Campus MovieFest International Grand Finale at the Stephen J. Ross Theater in Los Angeles.

In 2012, Blass garnered some attention for the music he wrote in a Funny Or Die video starring Sean Astin.

== Filmography ==
Year	Film	Notable Mentions
2008	The Grinder	
2009	It Was Nice to Meet You	Select cues co-written with Eymard Furtado
2009	Confession	
2009	Avarice	Additional Music
2010	Love and Kleptomania	
2010	Generation Why	
2011	FunMachine	Golden Tripod Award winner for Best Soundtrack
2012	Stitches	Featuring Vocals by Steffan Argus
2012	Less Lost	
2013	Andy	
2013	Decoy	
2014	Whoop Dreams	
2014	Streamline	Best Original Score at the 2021 Independent Shorts Awards
2015	Shadow May Lie	
2016	Sentinel	
2018	Shadows	
2019	To Err is Human: A Patient Safety Documentary	
2019	It Moves Slowly	
2020	15 Minutes of Faye	
2023	He Who Walks in Darkness	
2024	The Pitch: Patient Safety's Next Generation	
