= Kenneth Dion =

American professor of nursing

Kenneth W. Dion
- Citizenship: USA
- Education: University of Central Florida; University of Texas at Austin
- Known for: Business formation in nursing
- Awards: Fellow AAN; Fellow Sigma Nursing
- Scientific career
- Fields: Entrepreneurship and Nursing
- Workplaces: Insource Management Group; Decision Critical, Inc; Healthstream, Inc; Johns Hopkins University
- Thesis: (2011)
- Website: nursing.jhu.edu/faculty_research/faculty/faculty-directory/kenneth-dion

Kenneth W. Dion is an American entrepreneur and professor of nursing. He is best known for his contributions to business start-ups in information systems to support healthcare organizations.

Dion earned his BS (1991) in nursing from the University of Central Florida. He earned his MS (1995) in nursing, his MBA (1995), and his doctorate (2011), all from the University of Texas at Austin.

Prior to joining the faculty at Johns Hopkins University, where he is currently assistant dean for business innovation and strategic relationships, Dion was vice president and chief of nursing informatics at Healthstream, Inc., based in Nashville, TN. For more than a decade, he was the founder and chief executive officer of Decision Critical, Inc., based in Austin, TX.

In 2019, Dion was inducted as a Fellow of the American Academy of Nursing.

Currently, Dion serves as treasurer and a member of the board of directors of Sigma Theta Tau, the international honorary society of nursing.
