= Tinku Acharya =

Indian computer scientist

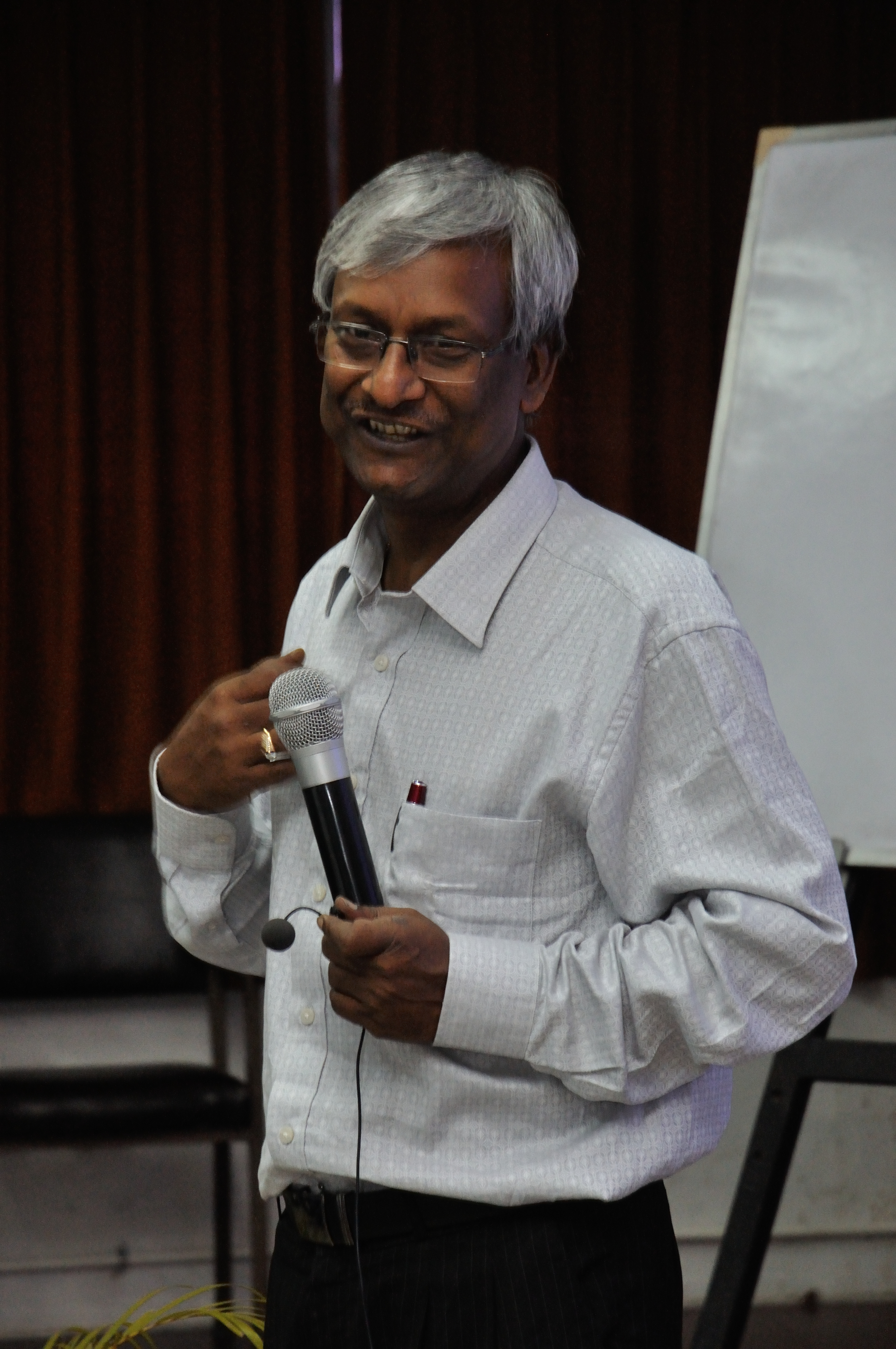
- Acharya lecturing in 2015
- Born: Howrah, West Bengal, India
- Education: University of Central Florida, USA, University of Calcutta
- Known for: Artificial intelligence, VLSI Architectures and Algorithms, JPEG 2000, Image and video compression

Tinku Acharya is an Indian computer scientist, technologist and fellow of the American institute, the IEEE.

== Early life and education ==
Tinku Acharya was born in Howrah, West Bengal, India. He received his BSc, BTech and MTech in CS from the Calcutta University in 1987. He completed PhD in Computer Science from the Central Florida University in 1994, USA with specialization in VLSI Architectures and Algorithms for Data Compression.

== Career ==
From 1996 to 2002, Acharya worked at Intel Corporation USA. He led several R&D and algorithm development teams in Intel Corporation (USA) to develop digital camera, electronic imaging systems and reprographics architecture for color photocopiers, and high-performance VLSI architectures. In late 90's, he developed the 'key image processing chain’ to map them into a small foot-print silicon for first dual-mode digital camera (Intel Corporation, USA).

During 1998 to 2002, he was an adjunct professor in the Department of Electrical engineering, Arizona State University, Tempe, Arizona. And Adjunct Professor at IIT Kharagpur in Electronics & Electrical Communication Engineering.

Tinku Acharya also served JPEG 2000 Standard Committee of in the US National Body in the International Organization for Standardization. He wrote the first book on JPEG 2000 Standard of this scalable image compression for its VLSI and software implementations.

Acharya started Videonetics in 2008, an artificial intelligence and deep learning-powered video computing platform company selected as Technology Pioneer by World Economic Forum.

Acharya contributed in modern enterprise-class Video Management System, Intelligent Video Analytics applications, and an Artificial Intelligence-based Unified Video Computing Platform.

Acharya worked at AT&T Labs, USA before joining Intel Corporation. He also served as the Director – IT at Intellectual Ventures from 2008 to 2012.

Acharya has collaborated with Eastman Kodak, Indian Statistical Institute Indian Institute of Science and many more.

Tinku Acharya participates and contributes in many activities promoting and advancement of science and technology in various fields in India. He served as a member of the Research Advisory Board of National Council of Science Museums, Ministry of Culture, Govt. of India. He was also a Governing Body Member of the Technology Innovation Hub at the Indian Institute of Technology, Patna.

== Invention ==
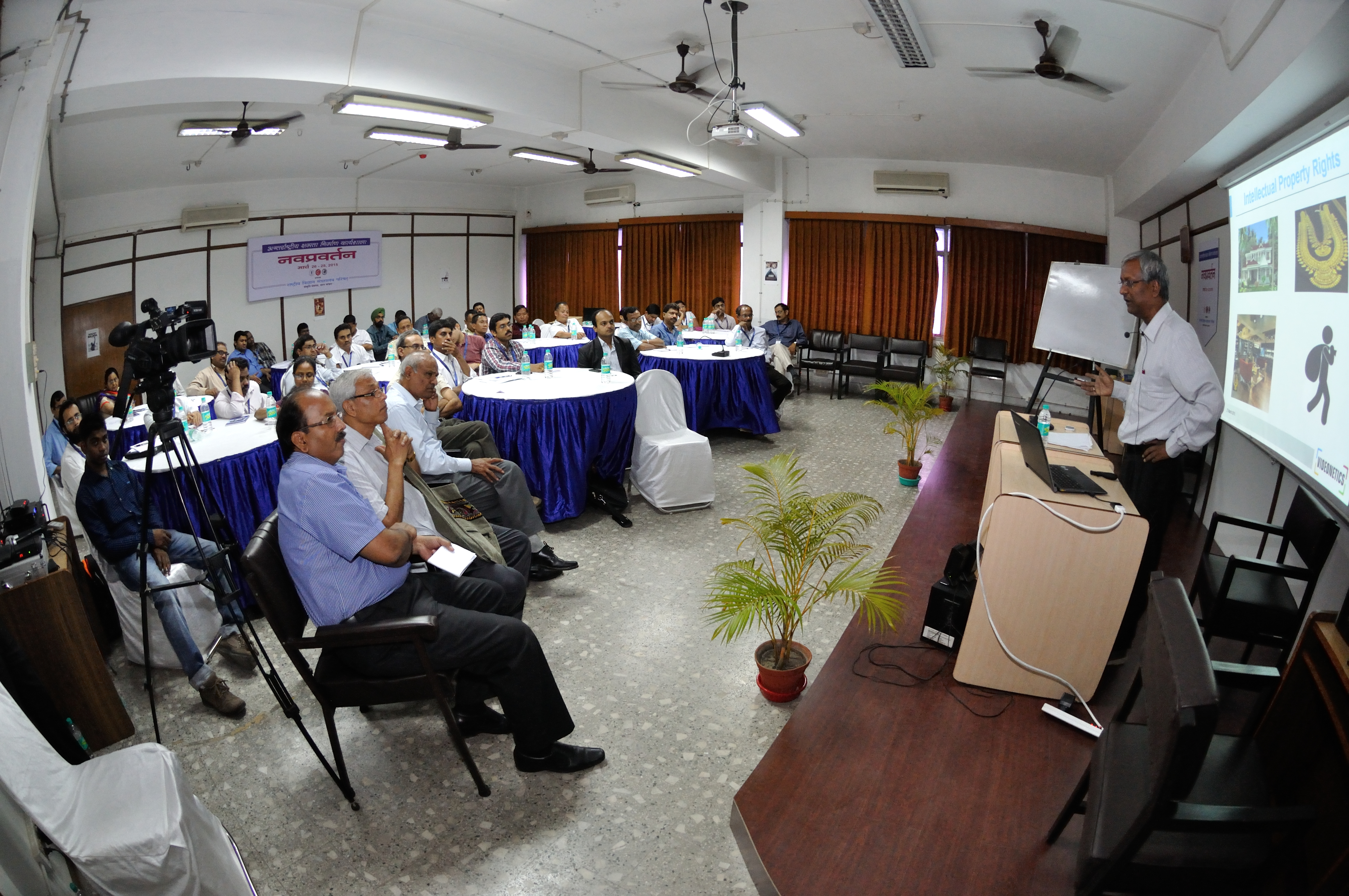
Tinku Acharya - Lecture Session - International Capacity Building Workshop on Innovation - NCSM - Kolkata 2015-03-27 4634

Acharya introduced the concept of "Sixel" (Sensory Elements) to unify multiple heterogenous types of sensory data into a single data structure like static image or motion pictures (video) to process all correlated sensory data using single analytical processing framework. He is inventor of over 180 international patents.

He is an expert in Intelligent Video processing, Artificial Intelligence, Video IoT (Internet of Things) and their pragmatic mapping in various multicore computing architectures and VLSI, actively engaged and influenced the development of today's Intelligent Video Analytics and Scalable Intelligent Video Management System since early 2000's.

== Awards and recognition ==
Acharya received many awards and recognition during his career. Some of the notables are as follows.

- Acharya was elevated to the status of IEEE Fellow in 2010 for his "contribution to the advancement of large scale integration algorithms and architectures for electronic image processing."
- In 2010, Acharya was the first recipient of the Acharya Prafulla Chandra Ray Memorial Award from the Institute of Pulmocare and Research for achievements in science and entrepreneurship.
- 2009 NASI-Reliance Platinum Jubilee Award from the National Academy of Sciences, India for Innovation in Physical Sciences’.
- In 2008, he received the ‘Engineer of the Year’ award from IEEE Phoenix, USA and ‘Outstanding Engineer’ award from IEEE Southwest Region, US.
