= Yisel Tejeda =

Dominican-American journalist

Yisel Tejeda is a Dominican-American journalist based in Orlando, Florida. She is the noon news anchor for WTMO Telemundo 31's Noticias Telemundo 31.

== Early life and education ==
Tejeda was born and raised in Brooklyn, New York, to Dominican parents. She received a Bachelor of Arts degree in Radio–Television from the University of Central Florida (UCF) in Orlando, Florida.

== Career ==
After graduating from UCF, Tejeda joined Univision Tampa Bay as a reporter and anchor, covering events including the 2012 Republican National Convention and the 2012 presidential election. She subsequently worked as an anchor, reporter, and producer for InfoMás and Bay News 9 in Tampa, Florida.

In 2015, Tejeda moved to New York and joined Univision 41 as an investigative reporter. In 2018, she became anchor of the morning newscast Noticias Univision 41 Al Despertar. In September 2019, she was promoted to anchor of the late-night newscast Noticias Univision 41 Solo a las Once. While at WXTV, Tejeda also anchored digital Spanish-language news segments for Altice USA's News 12 Networks.

In March 2022, after seven years at Univision 41, Tejeda joined Telemundo 31 in Orlando as noon anchor of Noticias Telemundo 31, with her on-air debut on 4 April 2022.

On 21 July 2016, Tejeda was named Goodwill Ambassador of the Bronx Dominican Parade. In March 2021, she was recognised by the Dominican Consulate in New York for her professional and social achievements. In June 2021, Tejeda served as a panelist during the second debate of the Democratic Primary for the 2021 New York City mayoral election.

== Awards ==
Tejeda is a New York Emmy Awards winner in the following categories:

- 2018 – Continuing Coverage
- 2018 – Journalistic Enterprise
- 2019 – Health/Science News
- 2020 – Morning Newscast (Anchor)
