= Melissa Jones (NASA) =

NASA landing and recovery director

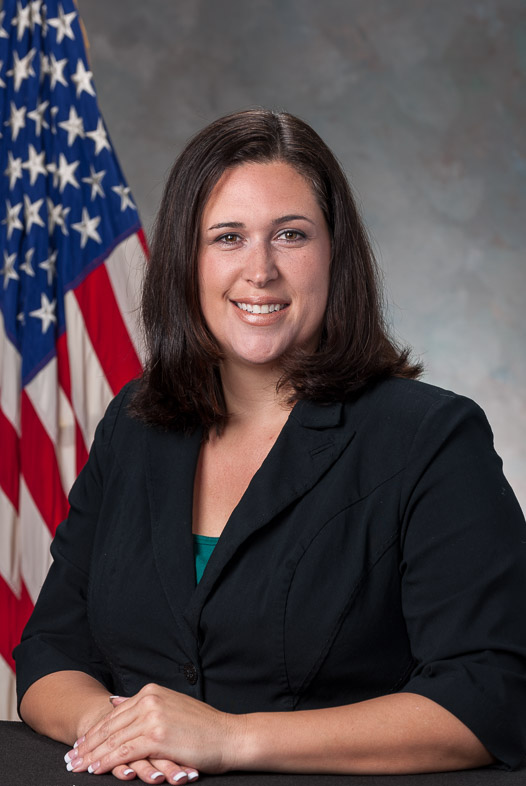
- Melissa Jones official Kennedy Space Center photo
- Born: Oak Hill, Florida
- Education: University of Central Florida
- Scientific career
- Workplaces: Kennedy Space Center

Melissa Jones is the NASA landing and recovery director for the Exploration Ground Systems Program, in the John. F. Kennedy Space Center in Florida. She leads retrieval of NASA flight crew and module hardware.

== Early life and education ==
Jones was born in Oak Hill, Florida. Her parents and grandparents worked in different aspects of space programs at Cape Canaveral Air Force Station. During junior high school, Jones was an intern at the Kennedy Space Center, where she worked on processing for Unity node. She studied electrical engineering at the University of Central Florida. She returned in 2016 and earned a master's degree in engineering management.

== Career ==
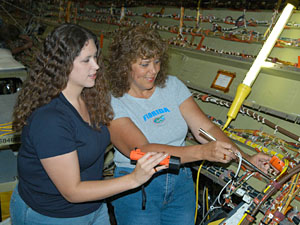
Melissa Jones (left) and mother Sue Hutchinson work on the Space Shuttle Endeavour in 2004.

Jones join the Space Shuttle program as a contractor in 2004. In 2007 she was appointed as lead orbiter project engineering for Space Shuttle Endeavour. In this role she looked to get Endeavour in a fit state to fly.

She led system engineering for NASA Ground and Mission Operations the Commercial Crew Program. This included ensuring operations were ready for the launch and integrated systems verification. Jones was part of the New Horizons flyby team in 2015.

In 2017 Jones was awarded a Rotary International National Award for Space Achievement Stellar Award. She serves as an expert for The Planetary Society.

Jones will lead the recovery team of Artemis 1 (previously Exploration Mission-1) that will work with the United States Navy to recover the Orion crew module. The recovery will take place in the ocean near San Diego, and Jones is responsible for the creation of a ship, with a landing platform, that can recover flight crews from open water. She has worked for the Underway Recovery Test 5 (URT-5). Jones was involved with the USS John P. Murtha Orion spacecraft recovery tests.

== Personal life ==
Jones is married with two children.
