= Andrea Zuvich =

American historian, consultant and author

Andrea Zuvich (born September 1985) is an American historian, historical consultant, and author of historical fiction. She specialises in the House of Stuart during the latter half of the 17th century. Zuvich is the founder of the website The Seventeenth Century Lady and is one of the most-followed historians on X/Twitter.

== Biography ==
She was educated in both History and Anthropology at the University of Central Florida.

In 2013, Endeavour Press published Zuvich's debut, His Last Mistress, a biographical fiction novel about the Duke of Monmouth's last and most important relationship. In 2014, she was on BBC Radio 4's Woman's Hour, discussing the importance of Queen Anne, the last Stuart monarch. Zuvich was one of the original developers of the award-winning Garden History Tours at Kensington Palace.

Besides publishing two historical fiction novels and one history book, Zuvich has also contributed a novella, "The Chambermaid" in the Steel and Lace Anthology. She has also written articles, including "The Allure of the Royal Mistress" for The Huffington Post UK, and "Five Things You (Probably) Didn't Know About The Stuarts" for History Scotland.

Zuvich is married and lives in Bolsover, Derbyshire.

== Published works ==
=== Non-fiction ===
- The Stuarts in 100 Facts. Amberley Publishing, Stroud, 2015. ISBN 1445647303
- A Year in the Life of Stuart Britain, Amberley Publishing, Stroud. Expected release 2016. ISBN 1445647427

=== Fiction ===
- His Last Mistress: The Duke of Monmouth and Lady Henrietta Wentworth. London, Endeavour Press ISBN 978-1490425566
- The Stuart Vampire: A Gothic Novel. London, The Seventeenth Century Lady. ASIN B00GBN90O2
