= List of UCF Knights bowl games =

The UCF Knights football team competes as part of the National Collegiate Athletic Association (NCAA) Division I Football Bowl Subdivision (FBS), representing The University of Central Florida in the Big 12 Conference. Since the establishment of the football program in 1979, the Knights have played in fifteen bowl games. UCF has appeared in eight different bowl programs, with multiple appearances in the St. Petersburg/Beef 'O' Brady's/Gasparilla Bowl (6), the Liberty Bowl (2), and the Fiesta Bowl (2). UCF has an overall bowl record of 6–9 (.400). They are 2-1 (.667) in BCS bowl games.

UCF's first bowl game came during the 2005 season when, under the leadership of second year head coach George O'Leary, the team underwent the fourth-best turnaround in NCAA history in his second year with the team. Before O'Leary, UCF had not made a postseason appearance since joining the FBS. As an FCS program, the Knights made the 1990 and 1993 playoffs, and were picked as the preseason No. 1 team to start the 1994 season. Since 2004, the Knights have made 15 postseason appearances in the years 2005, 2007, 2009, 2010, 2012, 2013, 2014, 2016, 2017, 2018, 2019, 2020, 2021, 2022 and 2023.

== Key ==
General
†	BCS Bowl Game
‡	Bowl game record attendance

Results
W	Win
L	Loss

== Bowl games ==
List of bowl games showing bowl played in, score, date, season, opponent, stadium, location, attendance and head coach
#	Bowl	Score	Date	Season	Opponent	Stadium	Location	Attendance	Head coach
1	Hawaii Bowl	L 49–48^{OT}	December 24, 2005	2005	Nevada Wolf Pack	Aloha Stadium	Honolulu	26,254	George O'Leary
2	Liberty Bowl	L 10–3	December 29, 2007	2007	Mississippi State Bulldogs	Liberty Bowl	Memphis	63,816	George O'Leary
3	St. Petersburg Bowl	L 45–24	December 19, 2009	2009	Rutgers Scarlet Knights	Tropicana Field	St. Petersburg	28,793	George O'Leary
4	Liberty Bowl	W 10–6	December 31, 2010	2010	Georgia Bulldogs	Liberty Bowl	Memphis	51,231	George O'Leary
5	Beef 'O' Brady's Bowl	W 38–17	December 21, 2012	2012	Ball State Cardinals	Tropicana Field	St. Petersburg	21,759	George O'Leary
6	Fiesta Bowl	W 52–42	January 1, 2014	2013	Baylor Bears	University of Phoenix Stadium	Glendale	65,172	George O'Leary
7	St. Petersburg Bowl	L 34–27	December 26, 2014	2014	NC State Wolfpack	Tropicana Field	St. Petersburg	26,675	George O'Leary
8	Cure Bowl	L 31–13	December 17, 2016	2016	Arkansas State Red Wolves	Camping World Stadium	Orlando	27,213	Scott Frost
9	Peach Bowl	W 34–27	January 1, 2018	2017	Auburn Tigers	Mercedes-Benz Stadium	Atlanta	71,109	Scott Frost
10	Fiesta Bowl	L 40–32	January 1, 2019	2018	LSU Tigers	State Farm Stadium	Glendale	57,246	Josh Heupel
11	Gasparilla Bowl	W 48–25	December 23, 2019	2019	Marshall Thundering Herd	Raymond James Stadium	Tampa	28,987	Josh Heupel
12	Boca Raton Bowl	L 49–23	December 22, 2020	2020	BYU Cougars	FAU Stadium	Boca Raton	6,000	Josh Heupel
13	Gasparilla Bowl	W 29–17	December 23, 2021	2021	Florida Gators	Raymond James Stadium	Tampa	63,669	Gus Malzahn
14	Military Bowl	L 13–30	December 28, 2022	2022	Duke Blue Devils	Navy–Marine Corps Memorial Stadium	Annapolis	17,974	Gus Malzahn
15	Gasparilla Bowl	L 17–30	December 22, 2023	2023	Georgia Tech Yellow Jackets	Raymond James Stadium	Tampa	30,281	Gus Malzahn

== See also ==
- American Athletic Conference
- Bowl Championship Series
- List of UCF Knights football seasons
- List of University of Central Florida alumni
