= NCAA Division I FBS passing leaders =

College football statistics

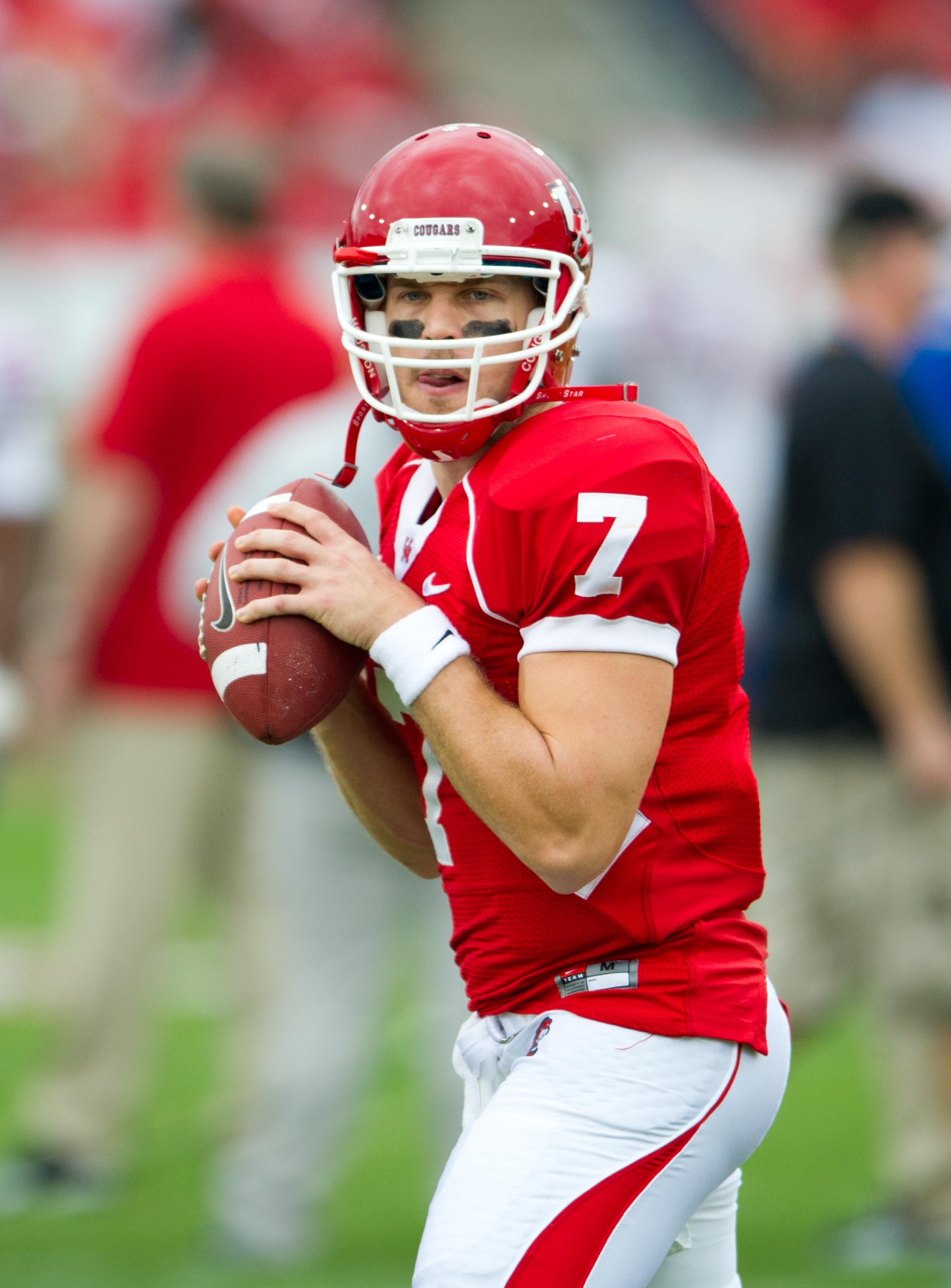
Case Keenum is the career record holder in completions, passing yards, and passing touchdowns.

The NCAA Division I FBS passing leaders comprise the career, single-season, and single-game leaders in passing yards, touchdowns, passer efficiency, completions, and completion percentage. These lists are disproportionately represented by more recent players for several structural and historical reasons:

- Since 1955, the length of the regular season has expanded from 10 games to 11 and later to 12 games, with some programs now playing additional postseason games, including conference championship games, bowl games, and the College Football Playoff.
- The NCAA did not permit freshmen to compete in varsity football until 1972 (with the exception of World War II–era seasons), preventing earlier players from accumulating statistics over four full seasons.
- Bowl games were not included in single-season or career statistics until 2002. As a result, many pre-2002 players are underrepresented; for example, Ty Detmer would have 16,206 passing yards and 127 passing touchdowns if bowl statistics were included, which would improve his rank in both categories.
- Beginning with the Southeastern Conference in 1992, FBS conferences introduced championship games, which have always counted toward official single-season and career statistics.
- The NCAA ruled that the 2020 season, which was heavily disrupted by the COVID-19 pandemic, would not count against a player’s athletic eligibility, effectively granting an additional year of eligibility to players active that season.
- Since 2018, players have been allowed to participate in as many as four games in a redshirt season; previously, playing in even one game "burned" the redshirt. Since 2024, postseason games have not counted against the four-game limit. These changes to redshirt rules have given very recent players several extra games to accumulate statistics.
- Only statistics accumulated while a player’s team competed in the Football Bowl Subdivision (FBS) are included. For example, Cam Ward threw 158 combined touchdowns across Football Championship Subdivision (FCS) (71) and FBS (87) competition, but only his 87 FBS touchdowns are counted here. Several other players—including Shedeur Sanders, Taylor Heinicke, Chad Pennington, Vernon Adams, and Bailey Zappe—also spent portions of their careers at the FCS level. In some cases, excluding FCS statistics alters statistical outcomes; for example, Sanders would have a lower career completion percentage and Zappe a lower passer efficiency rating if those seasons were included.

Legend
Active FBS Player
Current Record Holder
Previous Record Holder

All statistics are current through the completion of the 2025 NCAA Division I FBS football season.

== Passing yards ==
=== Career ===
Houston's Case Keenum is the NCAA career passing yards leader and the only player to throw for over 5,000 yards in three seasons. Like Timmy Chang of Hawaii, Keenum received a fifth year of eligibility after an early-career injury, which allowed him to surpass Chang, who had also benefited from a fifth year in 2001. Chang had broken BYU's Ty Detmer record, who had previously overtaken Todd Santos of San Diego State, now outside the top 50 in career passing yards.

#	Player	Yards	Seasons
1	Case Keenum	19,217	2007 2008 2009 2010 2011 Houston
2	Dillon Gabriel	18,722	2019 2020 2021 UCF ᛫ 2022 2023 Oklahoma ᛫ 2024 Oregon
3	Timmy Chang	17,072	2000 2001 2002 2003 2004 Hawaii
4	Landry Jones	16,646	2009 2010 2011 2012 Oklahoma
5	Graham Harrell	15,793	2005 2006 2007 2008 Texas Tech
6	Sam Hartman	15,656	2018 2019 2020 2021 2022 Wake Forest ᛫ 2023 Notre Dame
7	Bo Nix	15,352	2019 2020 2021 Auburn ᛫ 2022 2023 Oregon
8	Ty Detmer	15,031	1988 1989 1990 1991 BYU
9	Will Rogers	14,773	2020 2021 2022 2023 Mississippi State ᛫ 2024 Washington
10	Kellen Moore	14,667	2008 2009 2010 2011 Boise State
11	Baker Mayfield	14,607	2013 Texas Tech ᛫ 2015 2016 2017 Oklahoma
12	Luke Falk	14,486	2014 2015 2016 2017 Washington State
13	Seth Henigan	14,278	2021 2022 2023 2024 Memphis
14	Colt Brennan	14,193	2005 2006 2007 Hawaii
15	Rakeem Cato	14,079	2011 2012 2013 2014 Marshall
16	Holton Ahlers	13,927	2018 2019 2020 2021 2022 East Carolina
17	Michael Penix Jr.	13,741	2018 2019 2020 2021 Indiana ᛫ 2022 2023 Washington
18	Mason Rudolph	13,618	2014 2015 2016 2017 Oklahoma State
19	Sean Mannion	13,600	2011 2012 2013 2014 Oregon State
20	Brett Rypien	13,581	2015 2016 2017 2018 Boise State
21	Philip Rivers	13,484	2000 2001 2002 2003 NC State
22	Corey Robinson	13,477	2010 2011 2012 2013 Troy
23	Colt McCoy	13,253	2006 2007 2008 2009 Texas
24	Aaron Murray	13,166	2010 2011 2012 2013 Georgia
25	Kevin Kolb	12,964	2003 2004 2005 2006 Houston

#	Player	Yards	Seasons
26	Dan LeFevour	12,905	2006 2007 2008 2009 Central Michigan
27	Cooper Rush	12,894	2013 2014 2015 2016 Central Michigan
28	Brandon Doughty	12,855	2011 2012 2013 2014 2015 Western Kentucky
29	Derek Carr	12,843	2009 2011 2012 2013 Fresno State
30	Jayden Daniels	12,749	2019 2020 2021 Arizona State ᛫ 2022 2023 LSU
31	Tim Rattay	12,746	1997 1998 1999 Louisiana Tech
32	Ryan Lindley	12,690	2008 2009 2010 2011 San Diego State
33	Luke McCown	12,666	2000 2001 2002 2003 Louisiana Tech
34	Chris Redman	12,541	1996 1997 1998 1999 Louisville
35	Chase Daniel	12,515	2005 2006 2007 2008 Missouri
36	Mason Fine	12,505	2016 2017 2018 2019 North Texas
37	Brent Stockstill	12,495	2014 2015 2016 2017 2018 Middle Tennessee
38	Trevor Vittatoe	12,439	2007 2008 2009 2010 UTEP
39	Kliff Kingsbury	12,429	1999 2000 2001 2002 Texas Tech
40	Connor Bazelak	12,349	2019 2020 2021 Missouri ᛫ 2022 Indiana ᛫ 2023 2024 Bowling Green
41	Matt Barkley	12,327	2009 2010 2011 2012 USC
42	Kenny Pickett	12,303	2017 2018 2019 2020 2021 Pittsburgh
43	Jake Browning	12,296	2015 2016 2017 2018 Washington
44	Jared Goff	12,200	2013 2014 2015 California
45	Drew Lock	12,193	2015 2016 2017 2018 Missouri
46	Chevan Cordeiro	12,191	2018 2019 2020 2021 Hawaii ᛫ 2022 2023 San Jose State
47	Brock Purdy	12,170	2018 2019 2020 2021 Iowa State
48	Zach Terrell	12,088	2013 2014 2015 2016 Western Michigan
49	Zac Dysert	12,013	2009 2010 2011 2012 Miami (OH)
50	Clayton Tune	11,996	2018 2019 2020 2021 2022 Houston

=== Single season ===
The single-season leader in passing yards is Bailey Zappe, who transferred to Western Kentucky for his final year of eligibility after starting his career at FCS Houston Baptist (now Houston Christian). He broke a record that had stood for 18 years from Texas Tech's B. J. Symons. Prior to Symons, the record had been held by Detmer, who edged out Houston's David Klingler in 1990.

#	Player	Yards	Season
1	Bailey Zappe	5,967	2021 Western Kentucky
2	B. J. Symons	5,833	2003 Texas Tech
3	Graham Harrell	5,705	2007 Texas Tech
4	Case Keenum	5,671	2009 Houston
4	Joe Burrow	5,671	2019 LSU
6	Case Keenum	5,631	2011 Houston
7	Anthony Gordon	5,579	2019 Washington State
8	Colt Brennan	5,549	2006 Hawaii
9	Ty Detmer	5,188	1990 BYU
10	David Klingler	5,140	1990 Houston

#	Player	Yards	Season
11	Graham Harrell	5,111	2008 Texas Tech
12	Derek Carr	5,082	2013 Fresno State
13	Paul Smith	5,065	2007 Tulsa
14	Brandon Doughty	5,055	2015 Western Kentucky
15	Patrick Mahomes	5,052	2016 Texas Tech
16	Bryant Moniz	5,040	2010 Hawaii
17	Case Keenum	5,020	2008 Houston
18	Kliff Kingsbury	5,017	2002 Texas Tech
19	Matt Johnson	4,946	2015 Bowling Green
20	Tim Rattay	4,943	1998 Louisiana Tech

#	Player	Yards	Season
21	Mason Rudolph	4,904	2017 Oklahoma State
22	Michael Penix Jr.	4,903	2023 Washington
23	Bryce Young	4,872	2021 Alabama
24	Dwayne Haskins	4,831	2018 Ohio State
25	Brandon Doughty	4,830	2014 Western Kentucky
26	Gardner Minshew	4,779	2018 Washington State
26	Kyle McCord	4,779	2024 Syracuse Orange
28	Austin Reed	4,744	2022 Western Kentucky
29	Sonny Cumbie	4,742	2004 Texas Tech
30	Will Rogers	4,739	2021 Mississippi State

=== Single game ===
The first player to pass for 600 yards in a single game was Illinois' Dave Wilson, whose record stood for eight years. The 700-yard barrier was first breached in 1990 by David Klingler. The current single-game record of 734 is shared by Connor Halliday and Patrick Mahomes.

#	Player	Yards	Date / Team
1	Connor Halliday	734	Oct. 4, 2014 Washington State
1	Patrick Mahomes	734	Oct. 22, 2016 Texas Tech
3	David Klingler	716	Dec. 2, 1990 Houston
4	Matt Vogler	690	Nov. 3, 1990 TCU
5	B. J. Symons	661	Sep. 27, 2003 Texas Tech
6	Geno Smith	656	Sep. 29, 2012 West Virginia
7	Graham Harrell	646	Sep. 22, 2008 Texas Tech
8	Cody Hodges	643	Oct. 15, 2005 Texas Tech
9	Brian Lindgren	637	Oct. 6, 2001 Idaho
10	Scott Mitchell	631	Oct. 15, 1988 Utah
11	K. J. Costello	623	Sep. 26, 2020 Mississippi State
12	Jeremy Leach	622	Nov. 11, 1989 New Mexico
13	Dave Wilson	621	Nov. 8, 1980 Illinois
14	John Walsh	619	Oct. 30, 1993 BYU
15	Jimmy Klingler	613	Nov. 28, 1992 Houston

#	Player	Yards	Date / Team
16	David Neill	611	Oct. 10, 1998 Nevada
17	Drew Mestemaker	608	Oct. 24, 2025 North Texas
18	Anthony Gordon	606	Nov. 23, 2019 Washington State
19	Alan Bowman	605	Sep. 15, 2018 Texas Tech
20	Luke Falk	601	Nov. 22, 2014 Washington State
20	Daniel Meager	601	Sep. 7, 2007 North Texas
20	Dillon Gabriel	601	Oct. 17, 2020 UCF
23	Ty Detmer	599	Nov. 16, 1991 BYU
24	Patrick Mahomes	598	Nov. 29, 2014 Texas Tech
24	Baker Mayfield	598	Nov. 4, 2017 Oklahoma
26	Drew Anderson	597	Oct. 7, 2017 Buffalo
27	Brandon Doughty	593	Sep. 13, 2014 Western Kentucky
28	Chris Redman	592	Nov. 14, 1998 Louisville
29	Nick Mullens	591	Oct. 1, 2016 Southern Miss
30	Tim Rattay	590	Aug. 26, 1998 Louisiana Tech

== Passing touchdowns ==
=== Career ===
In 2024, Dillon Gabriel tied Case Keenum's passing touchdowns record of 155. Gabriel played in 64 career games compared to Keenum's 57.

#	Player	TDs	Seasons
1	Case Keenum	155	2007 2008 2009 2010 2011 Houston
1	Dillon Gabriel	155	2019 2020 2021 UCF ᛫ 2022 2023 Oklahoma ᛫ 2024 Oregon
3	Kellen Moore	142	2008 2009 2010 2011 Boise State
4	Graham Harrell	134	2005 2006 2007 2008 Texas Tech
4	Sam Hartman	134	2018 2019 2020 2021 2022 Wake Forest ᛫ 2023 Notre Dame
6	Colt Brennan	131	2005 2006 2007 Hawaii
6	Rakeem Cato	131	2011 2012 2013 2014 Marshall
6	Baker Mayfield	131	2013 Texas Tech ᛫ 2015 2016 2017 Oklahoma
9	Landry Jones	123	2009 2010 2011 2012 Oklahoma
10	Ty Detmer	121	1988 1989 1990 1991 BYU
10	Aaron Murray	121	2010 2011 2012 2013 Georgia
12	Luke Falk	119	2014 2015 2016 2017 Washington State
13	Timmy Chang	117	2000 2001 2002 2003 2004 Hawaii
14	Matt Barkley	116	2009 2010 2011 2012 USC
15	Tim Rattay	115	1997 1998 1999 Louisiana Tech
16	Danny Wuerffel	114	1993 1994 1995 1996 Florida
17	Derek Carr	113	2009 2011 2012 2013 Fresno State
17	Bo Nix	113	2019 2020 2021 Auburn ᛫ 2022 2023 Oregon
19	Colt McCoy	112	2006 2007 2008 2009Texas
20	Brandon Doughty	111	2011 2012 2013 2014 2015 Western Kentucky
21	Russell Wilson	109	2008 2009 2010 NC State ᛫ 2011 Wisconsin
22	Will Rogers	108	2020 2021 2022 2023 Mississippi State ᛫ 2024 Washington
23	Tajh Boyd	107	2010 2011 2012 2013 Clemson
24	Brent Stockstill	106	2014 2015 2016 2017 2018 Middle Tennessee
25	Marcus Mariota	105	2012 2013 2014 Oregon

#	Player	TDs	Seasons
26	J. T. Barrett	104	2014 2015 2016 2017 Ohio State
26	Clayton Tune	104	2018 2019 2020 2021 2022 Houston
26	Seth Henigan	104	2021 2022 2023 2024 Memphis
29	Dan LeFevour	102	2006 2007 2008 2009 Central Michigan
30	Chase Daniel	101	2005 2006 2007 2008 Missouri
31	Chad Pennington	100	1997 1998 1999 Marshall
32	Matt Leinart	99	2003 2004 2005 USC
32	Chase Clement	99	2005 2006 2007 2008 Rice
32	Tim Hiller	99	2005 2007 2008 2009 Western Michigan
32	Drew Lock	99	2015 2016 2017 2018 Missouri
36	Geno Smith	98	2009 2010 2011 2012 West Virginia
37	Trevor Vittatoe	97	2007 2008 2009 2010 UTEP
37	Holton Ahlers	97	2018 2019 2020 2021 2022 East Carolina
39	Jared Goff	96	2013 2014 2015 California
39	Zach Terrell	96	2013 2014 2015 2016 Western Michigan
39	Michael Penix Jr.	96	2018 2019 2020 2021 Indiana ᛫ 2022 2023 Washington
42	Kliff Kingsbury	95	1999 2000 2001 2002 Texas Tech
42	Brady Quinn	95	2003 2004 2005 2006 Notre Dame
42	Philip Rivers	95	2000 2001 2002 2003 NC State
42	Justin Herbert	95	2016 2017 2018 2019 Oregon
46	Max Hall	94	2007 2008 2009 BYU
46	Jake Browning	94	2015 2016 2017 2018 Washington
46	Sam Ehlinger	94	2017 2018 2019 2020 Texas
49	Logan Woodside	93	2013 2014 2015 2016 2017 Toledo
49	Patrick Mahomes	93	2014 2015 2016 Texas Tech
49	Mason Fine	93	2016 2017 2018 2019 North Texas
49	Caleb Williams	93	2021 Oklahoma ᛫ 2022 2023 USC

=== Single season ===
Bailey Zappe holds the NCAA single-season passing touchdowns record with 62, surpassing the mark set by Joe Burrow two seasons earlier.

#	Player	TDs	Season
1	Bailey Zappe	62	2021 Western Kentucky
2	Joe Burrow	60	2019 LSU
3	Colt Brennan	58	2006 Hawaii
4	David Klingler	54	1990 Houston
5	B. J. Symons	52	2003 Texas Tech
6	Sam Bradford	50	2008 Oklahoma
6	Derek Carr	50	2013 Fresno State
6	Dwayne Haskins	50	2018 Ohio State
9	Brandon Doughty	49	2014 Western Kentucky
10	Graham Harrell	48	2007 Texas Tech
10	Case Keenum	48	2011 Houston
10	Brandon Doughty	48	2015 Western Kentucky
10	Anthony Gordon	48	2019 Washington State

#	Player	TDs	Season
14	Jim McMahon	47	1980 BYU
14	Paul Smith	47	2007 Tulsa
14	Bryce Young	47	2021 Alabama
17	Andre Ware	46	1989 Houston
17	Tim Rattay	46	1998 Louisiana Tech
17	David Johnson	46	2008 Tulsa
17	Matt Johnson	46	2015 Bowling Green

#	Player	TDs	Season
21	Kliff Kingsbury	45	2002 Texas Tech
21	Graham Harrell	45	2008 Texas Tech
21	Logan Woodside	45	2016 Toledo
21	Bo Nix	45	2023 Oregon
25	Chase Clement	44	2008 Rice
25	Case Keenum	44	2008 Houston
25	Case Keenum	44	2009 Houston
25	Drew Lock	44	2017 Missouri
25	C. J. Stroud	44	2021 Ohio State

=== Single game ===
The single-game record holder is Houston's David Klingler, who threw for 11 touchdowns in a 1990 game against Eastern Washington. Five quarterbacks (including Klingler himself) have had a 9-touchdown game, and 7 quarterbacks have had an 8-touchdown game. Many quarterbacks have passed for 7 touchdowns in a game, too many to list here.

#	Player	TDs	Date / Team
1	David Klingler	11	Nov. 17, 1990 Houston
2	Dennis Shaw	9	Nov. 15, 1969 San Diego State
2	David Klingler	9	Aug. 31, 1991 Houston
2	Case Keenum	9	Oct. 27, 2011 Houston
2	Anthony Gordon	9	Sep. 21, 2019 Washington State
2	Tanner Mordecai	9	Nov. 5, 2022 SMU
7	Jason Martin	8	Oct. 19, 1996 Louisiana Tech
7	Pat Barnes	8	Nov. 2, 1996 California
7	Nick Rolovich	8	Dec. 8, 2001 Hawaii
7	B. J. Symons	8	Oct. 4, 2003 Texas Tech
7	Giovanni Vizza	8	Nov. 10, 2007 North Texas
7	Geno Smith	8	Sep. 29, 2012 West Virginia
7	Brandon Doughty	8	Nov. 28, 2014 Western Kentucky

== Passing efficiency ==
Passing efficiency is a measure of quarterback performance based on the following formula:

$\text{Passing Efficiency} = {(100 \times \text{completions}) + (8.4 \times \text{yards}) + (330 \times \text{touchdowns}) - (200 \times \text{interceptions}) \over \text{attempts}}$

Only passing statistics are included in the formula. Any yards or touchdowns gained rushing or by any other method are not a factor in the formula, and neither are fumbles. Players tend to rank highly on the list when they have a high completion percentage, high yards per completion, and many touchdowns to few interceptions.

=== Career ===
Alabama quarterback Tua Tagovailoa holds the highest career passer efficiency rating among players with at least 325 career pass completions. The career leaderboard is dominated by modern-era quarterbacks, with no players who debuted before the 21st century appearing in the top 25.

#	Player	Eff	Seasons
1	Tua Tagovailoa	199.4	2017 2018 2019 Alabama
2	Mac Jones	197.6	2018 2019 2020 Alabama
3	C. J. Stroud	182.4	2020 2021 2022 Ohio State
4	Kyler Murray	181.3	2015 Texas A&M ᛫ 2017 2018 Oklahoma
5	Justin Fields	178.8	2018 Georgia ᛫ 2019 2020 Ohio State
6	Sam Bradford	175.6	2007 2008 2009 Oklahoma
7	Baker Mayfield	175.4	2013 Texas Tech ᛫ 2015 2016 2017 Oklahoma
8	Grayson McCall	174.7	2019 2020 2021 2022 2023 Coastal Carolina ᛫ 2024 NC State
9	Dwayne Haskins	174.0	2017 2018 Ohio State
10	Joe Burrow	172.4	2016 2017 Ohio State ᛫ 2018 2019 LSU
11	Hendon Hooker	172.2	2018 2019 2020 Virginia Tech ᛫ 2021 2022 Tennessee
12	Marcus Mariota	171.8	2012 2013 2014 Oregon
13	Tim Tebow	170.8	2006 2007 2008 2009 Florida
14	Caleb Williams	169.3	2021 Oklahoma ᛫ 2022 2023 USC
15	Kellen Moore	169.0	2008 2009 2010 2011 Boise State
16	Ryan Dinwiddie	168.9	2000 2001 2002 2003 Boise State
17	Bailey Zappe	168.7	2021 Western Kentucky
18	Kyle Trask	168.5	2018 2019 2020 Florida
19	Colt Brennan	167.6	2005 2006 2007 Hawaii
20	Drew Mestemaker	167.5	2024 2025 North Texas
21	Bryce Petty	166.0	2011 2012 2013 2014 Baylor
22	Will Grier	165.1	2015 Florida ᛫ 2017 2018 West Virginia
23	Bryce Young	165.0	2020 2021 2022 Alabama
24	Demond Williams Jr.	164.6	2024 2025 Washington
25	Alex Smith	164.4	2002 2003 2004 Utah

#	Player	Eff	Seasons
26	Trevor Lawrence	164.3	2018 2019 2020 Clemson
27	Sam Howell	164.2	2019 2020 2021 North Carolina
28	Johnny Manziel	164.1	2012 2013 Texas A&M
29	Danny Wuerffel	163.6	1993 1994 1995 1996 Florida
30	Jameis Winston	163.3	2013 2014 Florida State
31	Zach Wilson	162.9	2018 2019 2020 BYU
31	Logan Woodside	162.9	2013 2014 2015 2016 2017 Toledo
33	Andrew Luck	162.8	2009 2010 2011 Stanford
34	Ty Detmer	162.7	1988 1989 1990 1991 BYU
34	Jalen Hurts	162.7	2016 2017 2018 Alabama ᛫ 2019 Oklahoma
36	A. J. McCarron	162.5	2010 2011 2012 2013 Alabama
37	Omar Jacobs	162.5	2003 2004 2005 Bowling Green
38	Steve Sarkisian	162.0	1995 1996 BYU
39	David Fales	161.7	2012 2013 San Jose State
40	Brandon Doughty	161.0	2011 2012 2013 2014 2015 Western Kentucky
41	Dillon Gabriel	160.9	2019 2020 2021 UCF ᛫ 2022 2023 Oklahoma ᛫ 2024 Oregon
42	Stetson Bennett	160.9	2020 2021 2022 2023 Georgia
43	Case Keenum	160.6	2007 2008 2009 2010 2011 Houston
44	J. J. McCarthy	160.5	2021 2022 2023 Michigan
45	Matt Johnson	160.4	2012 2013 2014 2015 Bowling Green
45	Shedeur Sanders	160.4	2023 2024 Colorado
47	Stefan LeFors	159.8	2001 2002 2003 2004 Louisville
48	Mason Rudolph	159.7	2014 2015 2016 2017 Oklahoma State
48	Kaleb Eleby	159.7	2018 2020 2021 Western Michigan
50	Matt Leinart	159.5	2003 2004 2005 USC

=== Single season ===
To qualify for the single-season passer efficiency leaderboard, a quarterback must average at least 14 pass attempts per game. The current record is held by Jayden Daniels of LSU, who set the mark in 2023. From 2016 through 2021, the single-season record was broken in six consecutive seasons, with a new leader each year.

#	Player	Eff	Team
1	Jayden Daniels	208.0	2023 LSU
2	Grayson McCall	207.6	2021 Coastal Carolina
3	Mac Jones	203.1	2020 Alabama
4	Joe Burrow	202.0	2019 LSU
5	Tua Tagovailoa	199.4	2018 Alabama
6	Kyler Murray	199.2	2018 Oklahoma
7	Baker Mayfield	198.9	2017 Oklahoma
8	Zach Wilson	196.4	2020 BYU
8	Baker Mayfield	196.4	2016 Oklahoma
10	Kaleb Eleby	195.1	2020 Western Michigan

#	Player	Eff	Team
11	Dustin Crum	192.7	2020 Kent State
12	Russell Wilson	191.8	2011 Wisconsin
13	Jalen Hurts	191.2	2019 Oklahoma
14	Robert Griffin III	189.5	2011 Baylor
15	Bo Nix	188.3	2023 Oregon
16	C. J. Stroud	186.6	2021 Ohio State
17	Colt Brennan	186.0	2006 Hawaii
18	Jameis Winston	184.8	2013 Florida State
19	Grayson McCall	184.3	2020 Coastal Carolina
20	Logan Woodside	183.3	2016 Toledo

#	Player	Eff	Team
21	Shaun King	183.3	1998 Tulane
22	Fernando Mendoza	182.9	2025 Indiana
23	Kellen Moore	182.6	2010 Boise State
24	Cam Newton	182.0	2010 Auburn
25	Marcus Mariota	181.7	2014 Oregon
25	Stefan LeFors	181.7	2004 Louisville
27	Justin Fields	181.4	2019 Ohio State
27	Hendon Hooker	181.4	2021 Tennessee
27	Mike White	181.4	2016 Western Kentucky
30	Sam Bradford	180.8	2008 Oklahoma

=== Single game ===
The NCAA does not officially recognize a single-game passer efficiency leaderboard, so records are based on documented box scores rather than an official list. Among the highest recorded single-game performances, Cincinnati quarterback Gunner Kiel holds the top mark with a 388.6 rating after completing 15 of 15 passes for 319 yards and five touchdowns in a 2015 game against UCF, while the highest rating with at least 20 attempts was by Oklahoma quarterback Kyler Murray against Baylor in 2018, marking Baylor’s second appearance as an opponent on this informal list; Murray completed 17 of 21 passes for 432 yards and six touchdowns for a 348.0 rating.

The NCAA doesn't recognize a full list for single games, but top performances include:

- Minimum 12 attempts – 403.4: – Tim Clifford of 1980 Indiana (11/14, 345 yards, 5 TD)
- Minimum 15 attempts – 388.6: – Gunner Kiel of 2015 Cincinnati (15/15, 319 yards, 5 TD)
- Minimum 20 attempts – 348.0 – Kyler Murray of 2018 Oklahoma (17/21, 432 yards, 6 TD)
- Minimum 25 attempts – 317.4 – Bruce Gradkowski of 2003 Toledo (23/25, 435 yards, 6 TD)
- Minimum 50 attempts – 248.0 – Geno Smith of 2012 West Virginia (45/51, 656 yards, 8 TD)

== Completions ==
=== Career ===
Keenum holds the NCAA Division I FBS career record for completions, surpassing the mark previously set by Harrell.

#	Player	Comp	Seasons
1	Case Keenum	1,546	2007 2008 2009 2010 2011 Houston
2	Will Rogers	1,521	2020 2021 2022 2023 Mississippi State ᛫ 2024 Washington
3	Luke Falk	1,404	2014 2015 2016 2017 Washington State
4	Graham Harrell	1,403	2005 2006 2007 2008 Texas Tech
5	Timmy Chang	1,388	2000 2001 2002 2003 2004 Hawaii
5	Landry Jones	1,388	2009 2010 2011 2012 Oklahoma
7	Dillon Gabriel	1,376	2019 2020 2021 UCF ᛫ 2022 2023 Oklahoma ᛫ 2024 Oregon
8	Bo Nix	1,286	2019 2020 2021 Auburn ᛫ 2022 2023 Oregon
9	Kliff Kingsbury	1,231	1999 2000 2001 2002 Texas Tech
10	Sean Mannion	1,187	2011 2012 2013 2014 Oregon State
11	Corey Robinson	1,179	2010 2011 2012 2013 Troy
12	Dan LeFevour	1,171	2006 2007 2008 2009 Central Michigan
13	Colt McCoy	1,157	2006 2007 2008 2009 Texas
13	Kellen Moore	1,157	2008 2009 2010 2011 Boise State
15	Rakeem Cato	1,153	2011 2012 2013 2014 Marshall
16	Connor Bazelak	1,151	2019 2020 2021 Missouri ᛫ 2022 Indiana ᛫ 2023 2024 Bowling Green
17	Seth Henigan	1,148	2021 2022 2023 2024 Memphis
18	Sam Hartman	1,135	2018 2019 2020 2021 2022 Wake Forest ᛫ 2023 Notre Dame
19	Holton Ahlers	1,127	2018 2019 2020 2021 2022 East Carolina
20	Colt Brennan	1,115	2005 2006 2007 Hawaii
21	Chase Daniel	1,094	2005 2006 2007 2008 Missouri
22	Philip Rivers	1,087	2000 2001 2002 2003 NC State
22	Derek Carr	1,087	2009 2011 2012 2013 Fresno State
24	Chase Holbrook	1,086	2006 2007 2008 New Mexico State
25	Michael Penix Jr.	1,067	2018 2019 2020 2021 Indiana ᛫ 2022 2023 Washington

#	Player	Comp	Seasons
26	Zac Dysert	1,066	2009 2010 2011 2012 Miami (OH)
27	Luke McCown	1,063	2000 2001 2002 2003 Louisiana Tech
28	Brent Stockstill	1,055	2014 2015 2016 2017 2018 Middle Tennessee
29	Shane Carden	1,052	2011 2012 2013 2014 East Carolina
30	Kenny Pickett	1,045	2017 2018 2019 2020 2021 Pittsburgh
31	Mason Fine	1,039	2016 2017 2018 2019 North Texas
32	Brett Rypien	1,036	2015 2016 2017 2018 Boise State
33	Keith Wenning	1,035	2010 2011 2012 2013 Ball State
34	Frank Harris	1,034	2019 2020 2021 2022 2023 UTSA
35	Chris Redman	1,031	1996 1997 1998 1999 Louisville
36	Baker Mayfield	1,026	2013 Texas Tech ᛫ 2015 2016 2017 Oklahoma
37	Brandon Doughty	1,023	2011 2012 2013 2014 2015 Western Kentucky
38	Cooper Rush	1,022	2013 2014 2015 2016 Central Michigan
39	Tim Rattay	1,015	1997 1998 1999 Louisiana Tech
40	Connor Halliday	1,014	2011 2012 2013 2014 Washington State
41	Tim Hiller	1,013	2005 2007 2008 2009 Western Michigan
42	Matt Barkley	1,001	2009 2010 2011 2012 USC
43	Jarret Doege	996	2017 2018 Bowling Green ᛫ 2019 2020 2021 West Virginia ᛫ 2022 Troy
44	Alan Bowman	994	2018 2019 2020 Texas Tech ᛫ 2021 2022 Michigan ᛫ 2023 2024 Oklahoma State
45	Brock Purdy	993	2018 2019 2020 2021 Iowa State
46	Clayton Thorson	991	2008 2009 2010 2011 Northwestern
47	Kedon Slovis	989	2019 2020 2021 USC ᛫ 2022 Pittsburgh ᛫ 2023 BYU
48	Geno Smith	988	2009 2010 2011 2012 West Virginia
48	E. J. Warner	988	2022 2023 Temple ᛫ 2024 Rice ᛫ 2025 Fresno State
50	Curtis Painter	987	2005 2006 2007 2008 Purdue

=== Single season ===
Harrell holds the single season record. Of the top 17 players on the list, 13 played under head coach Mike Leach.

#	Player	Comp	Team
1	Graham Harrell	512	2007 Texas Tech
2	Will Rogers	505	2021 Mississippi State
3	Anthony Gordon	493	2019 Washington State
4	Case Keenum	492	2009 Houston
5	Kliff Kingsbury	479	2002 Texas Tech
6	Bailey Zappe	475	2021 Western Kentucky
7	B. J. Symons	470	2003 Texas Tech
8	Gardner Minshew	468	2018 Washington State
9	Derek Carr	453	2013 Fresno State
10	Connor Halliday	449	2013 Washington State

#	Player	Comp	Team
11	Luke Falk	447	2015 Washington State
12	Luke Falk	443	2016 Washington State
13	Graham Harrell	442	2008 Texas Tech
14	Case Keenum	428	2011 Houston
15	Sonny Cumbie	421	2004 Texas Tech
16	Will Rogers	415	2022 Mississippi State
17	Graham Harrell	412	2006 Texas Tech
18	Brandon Weeden	409	2011 Oklahoma State
19	Colt Brennan	406	2006 Hawaii
19	Rakeem Cato	406	2012 Marshall

#	Player	Comp	Team
21	Landry Jones	405	2010 Oklahoma
22	Joe Burrow	402	2019 LSU
23	Tim Couch	400	1998 Kentucky
23	Sean Mannion	400	2013 Oregon State
25	Seth Doege	398	2011 Texas Tech
26	Case Keenum	397	2008 Houston
27	Chase Holbrook	396	2006 New Mexico State
28	Dominique Davis	393	2011 East Carolina
29	Shane Carden	392	2014 East Carolina
30	Kyle McCord	391	2024 Syracuse

=== Single game ===
The single-game record is tied between Eastern Michigan's Andy Schmidt and Washington State's Connor Halliday.

#	Player	Comp	Date / Team
1	Andy Schmitt	58	Nov. 28, 2008 Eastern Michigan
1	Connor Halliday	58	Oct. 19, 2013 Washington State
3	Case Keenum	56	Dec. 5, 2009 Houston
3	Connor Halliday	56	Oct. 25, 2014 Washington State
5	Rusty LaRue	55	Oct. 28, 1995 Wake Forest
5	Drew Brees	55	Oct. 10, 1998 Purdue
5	Luke Falk	55	Sep. 10, 2016 Washington State
8	David Piland	53	Sep. 8, 2012 Houston
9	Derek Carr	52	Aug. 29, 2013 Fresno State
9	Deshaun Watson	52	Nov. 12, 2016 Clemson
9	Patrick Mahomes	52	Oct. 22, 2016 Texas Tech
9	Gardner Minshew	52	Nov. 12, 2017 East Carolina
13	Case Keenum	51	Oct. 3, 2009 Houston
14	Rusty LaRue	50	Nov. 18, 1995 Wake Forest
14	Andy Schmitt	50	Nov. 22, 2008 Eastern Michigan
14	Luke Falk	50	Oct. 10, 2015 Washington State
14	Anthony Gordon	50	Nov. 23, 2019 Washington State
14	Will Rogers	50	Sep. 18, 2021 Mississippi State

#	Player	Comp	Date / Team
19	Brian Lindgren	49	Oct. 6, 2001 Idaho
19	Kliff Kingsbury	49	Oct. 5, 2002 Texas Tech
19	Kliff Kingsbury	49	Oct. 19, 2002 Texas Tech
19	Bruce Gradkowski	49	Sep. 20, 2003 Toledo
19	Chase Holbrook	49	Oct. 15, 2006 New Mexico State
19	Connor Halliday	49	Oct. 4, 2014 Washington State
19	Dwayne Haskins	49	Oct. 20, 2018 Ohio State
19	Carson Strong	49	Oct. 23, 2021 Nevada
27	Chase Holbrook	48	Sep. 30, 2006 New Mexico State
27	Graham Harrell	48	Sep. 8, 2007 Texas Tech
27	Anthony Gordon	48	Nov. 29, 2019 Washington State

== Completion percentage ==
=== Career ===
The NCAA does not officially recognize a full list for career completion percentage leaders. Instead, they are ranked by completion percentage based on number of attempts. References such as Sports Reference and StatMuse provide more comprehensive lists for various minimum attempt thresholds.

Career leaders for pass completion percentage include:

- Minimum 500 attempts – 74.3% – Mac Jones of Alabama
- Minimum 600 attempts – 72.7% – Dan Persa of Northwestern
- Minimum 875 attempts – 71.8% – Shedeur Sanders of Colorado
- Minimum 1,000 attempts – 70.4% – Colt Brennan of Hawaii

=== Single season ===
To qualify for the single-season completion percentage leaderboard, a player must average at least 14 pass attempts per game. Mac Jones held the NCAA single-season record for completion percentage until 2023, when it was broken by Bo Nix of Oregon. At the end of the 20th century, the record was held by Daunte Culpepper; he remains ninth on the all-time list and is the only player who debuted before the 21st century to appear.

#	Player	Pct	Cmp	Att	Team
1	Bo Nix	77.45%	364	470	2023 Oregon
2	Mac Jones	77.36%	311	402	2020 Alabama
3	Julian Sayin	76.98%	301	391	2025 Ohio State
4	Colt McCoy	76.67%	332	433	2008 Texas
5	Joe Burrow	76.28%	402	527	2019 LSU
6	Kellen Moore	74.26%	326	439	2011 Boise State
7	Shedeur Sanders	74.00%	353	477	2024 Colorado
8	Will Rogers	73.94%	505	683	2021 Mississippi State
9	Daunte Culpepper	73.63%	296	402	1998 UCF
10	Jacob Zeno	73.61%	279	379	2023 UAB
11	Stefan LeFors	73.54%	189	257	2004 Louisville
12	Zach Wilson	73.51%	247	336	2020 BYU
13	Dan Persa	73.51%	222	302	2010 Northwestern
14	Dustin Crum	73.45%	83	113	2020 Kent State
15	Dan Persa	73.40%	218	297	2011 Northwestern

#	Player	Pct	Cmp	Att	Team
16	Jack Abraham	73.11%	223	305	2018 Southern Miss
17	Tyler Huntley	73.09%	220	301	2019 Utah
18	Will Howard	73.04%	309	423	2024 Ohio State
19	Grayson McCall	73.03%	176	241	2021 Coastal Carolina
20	Dillon Gabriel	72.93%	326	447	2024 Oregon
21	Scott Tolzien	72.93%	194	266	2010 Wisconsin
22	Chase Daniel	72.92%	385	528	2008 Missouri
23	Graham Mertz	72.91%	261	358	2023 Florida
24	Haynes King	72.86%	176	241	2024 Georgia Tech
25	Russell Wilson	72.82%	225	309	2011 Wisconsin
26	Colt Brennan	72.63%	406	559	2006 Hawaii
27	Joe Southwick	72.60%	151	208	2013 Boise State
28	Wes Counts	72.59%	188	259	2001 Middle Tennessee
29	David Fales	72.51%	327	451	2012 San Jose State
30	Carson Beck	72.42%	302	417	2023 Georgia

=== Single game ===
The NCAA doesn't recognize a full list for single games, but top performances include:

- Minimum 15 attempts – 100% three times: (18 of 18) – Zach Wilson of 2018 BYU, (17 of 17) – Garrett Shrader of 2022 Syracuse, (15 of 15) – Gunner Kiel of 2015 Cincinnati
- Minimum 20 attempts – 96.00% two times: (24 of 25) – Greyson Lambert of 2015 Georgia – Hudson Card of 2024 Purdue
- Minimum 30 attempts – 93.94% two times: (31 of 33) – Kyle Allen of 2017 Houston – Owen McCown of 2025 UTSA
- Minimum 40 attempts – 90.91% (40 of 44) – Seth Doege of 2017 Texas Tech
- Minimum 50 attempts – 88.24% (45 of 51) – Geno Smith of 2012 West Virginia
- Minimum 60 attempts – 80.33% (49 of 61) – Carson Strong of 2021 Nevada

== Most wins by a starting quarterback ==
=== Career ===
This table lists the top Football Bowl Subdivision (FBS) quarterbacks ranked by career wins in games they started. Only victories earned while the player was the designated starting quarterback are counted (relief appearances are excluded), with ties included where applicable. Kellen Moore is the FBS record holder in this category, surpassing Colt McCoy’s previous mark in 2011; McCoy had broken David Greene’s record of 42 career wins as a starter in 2009 with a victory over Kansas. Some sources list Moore with 50 career wins, but he did not start against Fresno State in the regular season finale of his redshirt freshman year on Senior Day; the start (and win) for that game is officially credited to Bush Hamdan. The milestone was publicly celebrated following the victory over UNLV on November 5, 2011; however, based on official starter records, Moore officially surpassed McCoy’s career wins mark two weeks later against San Diego State on November 19, 2011.

Although Mark Gronowski holds the NCAA all-division record for career wins as a starting quarterback with 58 victories, he is not included on this list because his total was accumulated across both the FCS and FBS levels.

Bo Nix previously held the FBS record for career starts by a quarterback until it was surpassed by Dillon Gabriel in 2024.

#	Player	Seasons	GP	GS	W	L	T	%
1	Kellen Moore	2007–2011	53	52	49	3	0	94.2
2	Dillon Gabriel	2019–2024	64	63	46	17	0	73.0
3	Colt McCoy	2005–2009	53	53	45	8	0	84.9
4	Bo Nix	2019–2023	61	61	43	18	0	70.5
5	42 – many times							

=== Single season ===
This table lists FBS quarterbacks with the highest number of wins in a single season as a starter. Only victories earned while the player was the designated starting quarterback are counted, with ties included where applicable. Joe Burrow was the first player to surpass 15 wins in a single season in 2019, and the current single-season record is held by Fernando Mendoza with 16 wins in 2025. Both Burrow and Mendoza won a national championship and the Heisman Trophy in their respective seasons, while Stetson Bennett (2022) and J. J. McCarthy (2023) also captured national championships. Single-season win totals are higher and more common in recent years due to expanded schedules and extended playoff formats, which give quarterbacks more opportunities to earn victories.

#	Player	Season	GP	GS	W	L	T	%
1	Fernando Mendoza	2025	16	16	16	0	0	100.0
2	Joe Burrow	2019	15	15	15	0	0	100.0
2	Stetson Bennett	2022	15	15	15	0	0	100.0
2	J. J. McCarthy	2023	15	15	15	0	0	100.0
5	14 – many times							

== See also ==
- FCS passing leaders
- List of NCAA major college football yearly passing leaders
