= 2020 UCF Knights football team =

American college football season

2020 UCF Knights football

Boca Raton Bowl, L 23–49 vs. BYU
- Conference: American Athletic Conference
- Record: 6–4 (5–3 AAC)
- Head coach: Josh Heupel (3rd season)
- Co-offensive coordinators: Alex Golesh (1st season); Anthony Tucker (1st season)
- Offensive scheme: Spread
- Defensive coordinator: Randy Shannon (3rd season)
- Base defense: 4–3
- Home stadium: Bounce House

2020 American Athletic Conference football standings
	Conf.			Overall
Team	W		L	W		L
No. 8 Cincinnati y$	6	–	0	9	–	1
Tulsa y	6	–	0	6	–	3
Memphis	5	–	3	8	–	3
UCF	5	–	3	6	–	4
SMU	4	–	3	7	–	3
Houston	3	–	3	3	–	5
Navy	3	–	4	3	–	7
Tulane	3	–	5	6	–	6
East Carolina	3	–	5	3	–	6
Temple	1	–	6	1	–	6
South Florida	0	–	7	1	–	8
Championship: Cincinnati 27, Tulsa 24
$ – Conference champion; y – Championship game participant; Rankings from AP Poll.

The 2020 UCF Knights football team represented the University of Central Florida (UCF) during the 2020 NCAA Division I FBS football season. The Knights were led by third-year head coach Josh Heupel and played their home games at Bounce House in Orlando, Florida. They competed as members of the American Athletic Conference. The Knights finished the regular season 6–4 (5–3 conference) and notably did not have any games of their revised schedule postponed or canceled due to the COVID-19 pandemic.

The Knights were invited to the 2020 Boca Raton Bowl, which they lost to BYU. It was the program's fifth consecutive season playing in a bowl, the longest streak in program history. On January 27, 2021, head coach Josh Heupel departed for Tennessee.

== Preseason ==
=== Spring game ===
The 2020 UCF Spring game was originally scheduled for Saturday April 4, 2020 at the Bounce House. However, the game was postponed indefinitely on March 16 due to the COVID-19 pandemic.

=== AAC preseason media poll ===
The preseason Poll was released September 1

Media poll
Predicted finish	Team	Votes (1st place)
1	UCF	204 (10)
2	Cincinnati	201 (7)
3	Memphis	192 (2)
4	SMU	146
5	Navy	125 (1)
6	Tulane	118
7	Houston	114
8	Temple	88
9	Tulsa	49
10	East Carolina	42
11	South Florida	41

=== Coronavirus ===
The COVID-19 pandemic led to the cancellation of all 2020 spring athletic activities, including spring football practice, which had begun on February 28. On June 1, student-athletes were permitted to return to campus for voluntary workouts, and sixty football players would be back to begin training as early as June 8. In mid-June 2020, it was reported that three Knights football players had tested positive for COVID-19. A second wave of approximately thirty additional players arrived on campus on June 22.

On August 7, Sports Illustrated reported that fall camp practices had been temporarily paused at UCF after players expressed concerns over COVID-19 safety protocols. A document titled "Proposal for Change" was circulated to at least four AAC schools, outlining ten player-driven issues. On September 1, it was announced that ten UCF players were opting out of the 2020 season. Included on the list were back-up quarterback Darriel Mack Jr., cornerback Tay Gowan, and defensive tackle Kalia Davis.

Prior to the start of the season, it was announced that spectators would be allowed at the first UCF home game on October 3. The stadium would be allowed up to 25% capacity for the game against Tulsa.

=== Stadium ===
The Knights home stadium was renamed Bounce House for 2020. Previously it was named Bright House Networks Stadium (2007–2016) and later Spectrum Stadium (2017–2019) after Charter Communications acquired Bright House. Spectrum's naming rights deal expired after the 2019 season, and a tentative naming rights deal with RoofClaim.com was canceled after drawing controversy. As a result, the stadium was officially renamed Bounce House on August 1, 2020. The comes from the facility's longtime nickname "The Bounce House", as it was found to be susceptible to considerable shaking when its crowd jumps in unison.

For the first home game of the season only, RoofClaim.com logos remained on the playing field as field sponsor, a contract carried over from 2019. Starting with the second home game of the season on October 24, RoofClaim.com logos were removed from the playing field and replaced with FBC Mortgage.

=== Training camp ===
In 2019, true freshman Dillon Gabriel emerged as the starting quarterback by week 2. Gabriel entered the 2020 season as the expected starter, and his status was cemented after Darriel Mack Jr. announced he was opting out of playing due to COVID-19. Mack later announced he was entering the transfer portal. Quadry Jones was elevated to the backup quarterback position, with McKenzie Milton, still recovering from his 2018 knee injury, also on the depth chart. Milton took part in preseason training camp, but head coach Josh Heupel announced that Milton would not play in the first few games of the season.

== Schedule ==
UCF had games scheduled against North Carolina (September 4) and Florida A&M (November 7), which were canceled due to the COVID-19 pandemic. In addition, the games against ECU and Memphis, originally scheduled to be Thursday night and Friday night games, respectively, were pushed back to Saturdays.

When the ACC announced its modified schedule for the 2020 season, it permitted each member school one out-of-conference game. With both Georgia Tech and North Carolina scheduled to play UCF in 2020, North Carolina elected to drop their game with UCF. Georgia Tech kept UCF as their out-of-conference game. The UNC game was part of a home-and-home series, but its other game in 2018 was also canceled, that time due to Hurricane Florence. This game was part of a restructured schedule that combined the original remaining leg of that series with a subsequent series scheduled for 2024 and 2025, moving the latter two games to 2025 and 2027.

The Florida A&M game was lost when the MEAC canceled all fall sports outright on July 16, 2020.

UCF's game with FIU on September 12 was originally planned to be played as scheduled, and would have served as UCF's season opener. However, FIU called the game off on August 13 when the university chose to postpone all athletic events until September 16. UCF would later drop the matching 2022 away game at FIU.

Date	Time	Opponent	Rank	Site	TV	Result	Attendance
September 19	3:30 p.m.	at Georgia Tech*	No. 14	Bobby Dodd Stadium; Atlanta, GA	ABC	W 49–21	11,000
September 26	12:00 p.m.	at East Carolina	No. 13	Dowdy–Ficklen Stadium; Greenville, NC	ABC	W 51–28	305
October 3	7:30 p.m.	Tulsa	No. 11	Bounce House; Orlando, FL	ESPN2	L 26–34	8,874
October 17	3:30 p.m.	at Memphis		Liberty Bowl Memorial Stadium; Memphis, TN	ABC	L 49–50	10,554
October 24	2:00 p.m.	Tulane^{†}		Bounce House; Orlando, FL	ESPN2	W 51–34	9,148
October 31	2:00 p.m.	at Houston		TDECU Stadium; Houston, TX	ESPN+	W 44–21	8,630
November 14	7:30 p.m.	Temple		Bounce House; Orlando, FL (Space Game)	ESPNU	W 38–13	8,768
November 21	3:30 p.m.	No. 7 Cincinnati		Bounce House; Orlando, FL (rivalry)	ESPN	L 33–36	10,668
November 27	3:30 p.m.	at South Florida		Raymond James Stadium; Tampa, FL (rivalry)	ESPN	W 58–46	8,801
December 22	7:00 p.m.	vs. No. 16 BYU*		FAU Stadium; Boca Raton, FL (Boca Raton Bowl)	ESPN	L 23–49	6,000
*Non-conference game; ^{†}Homecoming; Rankings from AP Poll and CFP Rankings (after November 24) released prior to game; All times are in Eastern time

- Source: FBSchedules.com

== Rankings ==
Ranking movements Legend: ██ Increase in ranking ██ Decrease in ranking — = Not ranked RV = Received votes
	Week																	
Poll	Pre	1	2	3	4	5	6	7	8	9	10	11	12	13	14	15	16	Final
AP	21	21*	14	13	11	RV	RV	—	—	—	—	RV	—	RV	RV	RV	RV	—
Coaches	21	21*	13	15	12	25	RV	RV	RV	RV	—	—	—	RV	—	—	—	—
CFP	Not released												—	—	—	—	—	Not released

== Game summaries ==
=== At Georgia Tech ===
	1	2	3	4	Total
No. 14 Knights	7	21	0	21	49
Yellow Jackets	7	7	0	7	21

After their first two scheduled games were canceled due to COVID-19, UCF started the 2020 season on the road at Georgia Tech. The game was held with limited spectators, and approximately 11,000 fans were in attendance. Sophomore quarterback Dillon Gabriel threw for a career-best 417-yards and four touchdowns, and the Knights defeated the Yellow Jackets 49–21.

Jahmyr Gibbs took the opening kickoff back 61 yards for Georgia Tech, setting up a 1-yard touchdown run by Jeff Sims, and a 7–0 Yellow Jacket lead. On the ensuing drive, Gabriel led the Knights on an 8-play, 75-yard drive, capped off by a touchdown grab by Tre Nixon. Georgia Tech fumbled away the ball at the UCF 8 yard line on their next possession, then had a field goal attempt blocked. The Knights scored three touchdowns on their next four drives, and took a 28–14 lead into halftime.

The third quarter was comparatively sloppy for both teams. The Knights received the ball for the second half, but turned the ball over on downs. On the next play, the Yellow Jackets fumbled the ball away at their own 29 yard line. However, one play later, a Gabriel pass was tipped and intercepted at the 19 yard line. The two teams traded possession three times until the Yellow Jackets finally got a score on a 33-yard touchdown by Jahmry Gibbs, and trimmed the deficit to 28–21.

In the fourth quarter, the Knights took over the game, scoring touchdowns on three straight possessions. Gabriel completed a 40-yard pass to Marlon Williams, setting up a 1-yard touchdown run by Otis Anderson Jr. After holding Georgia Tech to a turnover on downs, the Knights capitalized on the resulting good field position. Gabriel's 7-yard touchdown pass to Williams made the score 42–21 in favor of the Knights. On the first play of the next drive, Jeff Simms was intercepted by Stephon Zayas at the Georgia Tech 20 yard line. Four plays later, the Knights were in the endzone once again. Bentavious Thompson scored a 4-yard touchdown run to seal the game for the Knights.

UCF won their fifth straight opening day game, and notched their 36th win in their last 40 games. They also extended their streak of scoring at least one passing touchdown and one rushing touchdown to 40 games, the longest active streak in the nation.

=== At East Carolina ===
	1	2	3	4	Total
No. 13 Knights	10	17	14	10	51
Pirates	7	0	7	14	28

UCF faced East Carolina in their conference opener. The game was held behind closed doors, with approximately 305 spectators in attendance, most being family members of players from both teams. After a discombobulated start, and despite a team record for most penalties (19 for 139 yards), the Knights rolled over the Pirates by the score of 51–28.

ECU won the coin toss and elected to receive the opening kickoff. The Pirates drove 75 yards in 9 plays, and took a 7–0 lead. The Knights first possession started off in bizarre fashion, as four consecutive false start penalties pushed them back to their own 5 yard line. Despite the four penalties, and another later in the drive, the Knights nevertheless drove for a touchdown to tie the game at 7–7.

The Knights defense forced turnovers on the next four Pirates drives. The Pirates lost three fumbles and had a turnover on downs in UCF territory. The Knights scored two field goals off of the turnovers, and led 13–7 midway through the second quarter. The Knights offense took control of the game, as Dillon Gabriel connected with a wide open Jaylon Robinson, who escaped untouched for a 64-yard touchdown pass. In the final two minutes of the second quarter, Bentavious Thompson blasted for a 25-yard run to the ECU 31, setting up a 7-yard touchdown pass from Gabriel to Jake Hescock. The Knights led 27–7 at halftime.

The Knights scored touchdowns on their first two possessions of the second half, jumping out to a 41–7 in the third quarter. Later, an interception in the endzone by Richie Grant snuffed out yet another ECU drive. The Knights iced the game with four minutes left in regulation. Johnny Richardson rushed for a 31-yard touchdown, and won by a final score of 51–28.

UCF started 2–0 for the fourth straight year, won their fifth straight conference opener, and notched their 37th overall win in their last 41 games. They also extended their streak of scoring at least one passing touchdown and one rushing touchdown to 41 games, the longest active streak in the nation. Quarterback Dillon Gabriel also set a school record with 18 consecutive pass completions.

=== Tulsa ===
	1	2	3	4	Total
Golden Hurricane	2	10	13	9	34
No. 11 Knights	16	7	3	0	26

UCF fell to Tulsa for the second season in a row and snapped a school record 21-game home winning streak. The Knights led 23–5 in the second quarter, but penalties and miscues were again the story of the game. The game was the home opener for the Knights, and limited attendance (approximately 25%) was permitted. A crowd of 8,874 was on hand on a rainy night.

The Knights had 18 penalties for 124 yards, just shy of the respective penalty records set the week before. Quarterback Dillon Gabriel threw for 330 yards, one touchdown pass and one interception. Injuries sidelined several players including wide receiver Marlon Williams, who was down on the field for several minutes. Running back Otis Anderson scored on a 49-yard touchdown run in the first quarter, but was kept mostly at bay. For the game, Anderson was held to only 84 yards on 17 carries, including the long touchdown run.

UCF fell to 2–1 overall (1–1 conference). Despite the loss, they kept their streak alive of scoring at least one passing touchdown and one rushing touchdown to 42 games, the longest active streak in the nation. They also failed to score 30+ points for only the second time in the last 42 games.

=== At Memphis ===
	1	2	3	4	Total
Knights	7	20	8	14	49
Tigers	7	7	15	21	50

Quarterback Dillon Gabriel threw for a school record 601 passing yards and threw 5 touchdown passes, but the Knights fell by a score of 50–49 to Memphis. The two teams totaled 1,501 total yards of offense, and 99 total points. The Tigers scored a go-ahead touchdown with 1:08 remaining in the fourth quarter. Gabriel then drove the Knights in five plays to the Memphis 22 yard line. With 19 seconds left in regulation, Daniel Obarski missed the game-winning 40-yard field goal attempt.

UCF fell to 2–2 overall (1–2 conference), and lost their first game to Memphis since 1990, when UCF was part of Division I-AA. Despite the loss, they kept their streak alive of scoring at least one passing touchdown and one rushing touchdown to 43 games, the longest active streak in the nation.

=== Tulane ===
	1	2	3	4	Total
Green Wave	14	0	14	6	34
Knights	10	27	14	0	51

UCF snapped a two-game losing streak, defeating Tulane by the score of 51–34 on Homecoming. Quarterback Dillon Gabriel threw for 422 yards and 5 touchdown passes. Marlon Williams caught three touchdown passes and totaled 174 yards in receiving. Tulane had an early 7–3 lead, but Gabriel connected to Williams for a 54-yard touchdown pass and a lead the Knights would not surrender. The Knights scored four touchdowns on four drives in the second quarter to take an 37–14 lead into halftime. After penalty problems in previous games, UCF had only four flags for 20 yards.

Through Week 8, UCF leads the nation in total offense (646.8 yards/game) and total passing yards (435.6 yards/game). Dillion Gabriel leads the nation in most passing yards (2,178), most pass completions (148), longest pass completion (93 yards), and most touchdown passes (19). The game against Tulsa was the fourth annual "Space Game", which celebrates the university's ties to NASA and the nearby Kennedy Space Center. Coincidentally, a SpaceX Falcon 9 rocket launch occurred just prior to the game, visible from the stadium.

=== At Houston ===
	1	2	3	4	Total
Knights	10	13	0	21	44
Cougars	7	0	6	8	21

Quarterback Dillon Gabriel threw for 328 yards and two touchdown passes, while Otis Anderson rushed for 170 yards and one touchdown as the Knights defeated Houston by the score of 44–21. The Cougars took an early 7–3 lead after a sack and fumble by Gabriel was scooped up by Grant Stuart who returned the ball 34 yards for a touchdown. The Knights quickly recovered, as Gabriel threw a 34-yard touchdown pass to Ryan O'Keefe to go back ahead 10–7. The Cougars drove inside the UCF 20 yard line, but quarterback Clayton Tune was intercepted Eriq Gilyard. The turnover led to another UCF touchdown, and the Knights would lead 23–7 at halftime.

After a scoreless third quarter for the Knights, Houston trimmed the deficit to 23–13. UCF blasted for three touchdowns in the fourth quarter, including a 28-yard run by Anderson to put the game out of reach. The Knights kept alive their streak of scoring at least one passing touchdown and one rushing touchdown to 45 games, the longest active streak in the nation.

Five players did not make the trip after a traffic stop incident two days before the game on October 29. Antwan Collier, Randy Charlton, Kenny Turnier, and Eric Mitchell were later dismissed from the team on November 2.

=== Temple ===
	1	2	3	4	Total
Owls	0	3	0	10	13
Knights	21	0	17	0	38

The Temple Owls turned the ball over on their first two drives of the game, and UCF capitalized with a fast start. With a short field in both instances, the Knights turned both turnovers into touchdowns. UCF jumped out to a 21–0 lead in the first quarter, and beat Temple easily to improve to 5–2 (4–2 AAC) on the season. Quarterback Dillon Gabriel and the UCF offensive unit had a lackluster first half, however, punting on the next three drives. Gabriel went only 5/14 for 84 yards in the first half. The Knights were scoreless in the second quarter (the first time all season), but still led at halftime 21–3. Gabriel rebounded in the second half, connecting at one point with Jaylon Robinson for a 70-yard completion, followed on the next play by a 21-yard touchdown pass to Marlon Williams.

Though UCF managed a season-low 419 yards of total offense, they still lead the nation through Week 10 in total yards/game (619.1) and total passing yards/game (396.9). The Knights kept alive their streak of scoring at least one passing touchdown and one rushing touchdown to 46 games, the longest active streak in the nation. They have also scored 30+ points in 44 of their last 46 games, and have won 23 of the last 24 home games at the Bounce House.

=== Cincinnati ===
	1	2	3	4	Total
No. 7 Bearcats	3	16	3	14	36
Knights	14	3	8	8	33

Quarterback Dillon Gabriel threw for 243 yards and three touchdown passes, but the Knights fell to #7 Cincinnati by the score of 36–33. It was only the Knights' second home loss in 25 games, as the Knights have gone 23–2 at the Bounce House since the start of the 2017 season.

The Knights jumped out to a 14–3 lead in the first quarter, after an opening drive of 75 yards, capped off by a 3-yard run by Greg McCrae. Then, Cincinnati return man Ryan Montgomery muffed a punt, which set up UCF's second touchdown. Cincinnati would lead 19–17 at halftime, as the Knights offense sputtered in the second quarter.

Gabriel drove the Knights for another touchdown late in the third quarter, to give UCF a 25–22 lead. But on their next possession, Gabriel's pass went through the hands of intended receiver Marlon Williams, and was intercepted by Darrick Forrest. Trailing 36–25 in the fourth quarter, Gabriel and the Knights scored a touchdown (and a two-point conversion) to trim the deficit to 36–33 with 4:27 left in regulation. With three timeouts left, the Knights kicked off, but could not stop the Bearcats from driving down the field and winding out the clock. Cincinnati drove to the UCF 1 yard line, where on a 4th down & Goal, they turned the ball over on downs after an errant shotgun snap. UCF took over with 1 second left on the clock, but were unable to score, and the Bearcats won the head-to-head matchup for the second season in a row.

The Knights kept alive their streak of scoring at least one passing touchdown and one rushing touchdown to 47 games, the longest active streak in the nation. They also maintained a streak of 47 consecutive games scoring 24+ points, second longest active streak in the nation behind Oklahoma (61).

=== At South Florida ===
	1	2	3	4	Total
Knights	14	17	14	13	58
Bulls	7	7	14	18	46

The final game of the regular season for UCF saw the Knights take on rival South Florida at Raymond James Stadium. Without running back Otis Anderson and without leading wide receiver Marlon Williams, the Knights nevertheless outlasted the Bulls by the score of 58–46. The two teams combined for 104 points and 1,223 total yards, both statistics eclipsing the marks set in the noteworthy 2017 meeting. Quarterback Dillon Gabriel threw for 336 yards, four touchdown passes, one interception, and ran for a touchdown. But Bulls quarterback Jordan McCloud (404 yards, 4 touchdown passes) helped turn the game into an offensive shootout.

The Bulls took a 7–0 lead, but the Knights scored 28 unanswered points and took a 31–14 lead into halftime. The Bulls pulled within ten points on two occasions, but two fourth quarter touchdown runs by Greg McCrae and Bentavious Thompson, respectively, sealed the victory for the Knights. UCF won their fourth straight meeting against the Bulls, with the senior class finishing undefeated against the rival for the first time. The Knights finished the regular season 6–3 (5–3 conference). The Knights kept alive their streak of scoring at least one passing touchdown and one rushing touchdown to 48 games, the longest active streak in the nation. They also maintained a streak of 48 consecutive games scoring 24+ points, second longest active streak in the nation behind Oklahoma (62). Despite pregame speculation, quarterback MacKenzie Milton, severely injured approximately two years earlier to the day, did not suit up for the game.

Upon the completion of Week 13, UCF ranked first in NCAA Division I FBS in total offensive yards (5,270), second in total yards/game (585.6), second in total passing yards (3,357), and first in passing yards/game (373.0). The team also ranked third in the nation in total points (399). Individually, quarterback Dillon Gabriel ranked first in the nation in passing yards (3,353), second in touchdown passes (30), second in pass completions (227), and second in pass attempts (368).

=== Boca Raton Bowl ===
	1	2	3	4	Total
Knights	0	10	7	6	23
No. 17 Cougars	21	14	14	0	49

The Knights accepted a bid to the Boca Raton Bowl December 7, and faced BYU. This was the third meeting between the two schools. BYU won the first meeting 24–17 in 2011 at Provo, while UCF won the second meeting 31–24 in 2014 at Orlando.

The BYU Cougars jumped out to a 21–0 lead and routed the UCF Knights by the score of 49–23 in front of a limited crowd of about 6,000 spectators. Knights quarterback Dillon Gabriel was held to only 217 yards passing and the offense was held to a below-average 411 total yards. Defensive stars Richie Grant and Aaron Robinson opted out of playing in the game, leaving the already maligned and depleted defensive unit further short-handed. Senior running back Otis Anderson Jr., who missed the game against USF, returned to the lineup. Anderson rushed for 73 yards, and had two pass receptions, in his final game with the Knights - and final football game prior to his death on November 29, 2021.

Despite the loss, the Knights finished their season with their streak still alive of scoring at least one passing touchdown and one rushing touchdown - extended to 49 games - the longest active streak in the nation. It was the final game for head coach Josh Heupel, who left the program about a month later for Tennessee.

== Personnel ==
=== Coaching staff ===
Name	Position	Alma mater	Year Entering
Josh Heupel	Head Coach	Oklahoma	3rd
Glen Elarbee	Assistant Head Coach for Offense/Offensive Line	Middle Tennessee St.	3rd
Willie Martinez	Assistant Head Coach/Secondary	Miami (FL)	3rd
Randy Shannon	Defensive coordinator/Linebackers	Miami (FL)	3rd
Anthony Tucker	Co-Offensive coordinator/Running backs	Fresno State	3rd
Alex Golesh	Co-Offensive coordinator/Tight end	Ohio State	1st
Nick Toth	Special Teams Coordinator	Ohio	3rd
Joey Halzle	Quarterback	Oklahoma	2nd
Darrell Wyatt	Wide Receivers	Kansas State	3rd
Corey Bell	Cornerbacks	South Carolina	3rd
Shane Burnham	Defensive Line	South Carolina	3rd

== Awards and milestones ==
=== School records ===
- Most consecutive games scoring both a rushing touchdown and a passing touchdown: 49 (ongoing)
- Most consecutive pass completions, single game: 18 (Dillon Gabriel, at East Carolina, September 26, 2020)
- Most passing yards, single game: 601 (Dillon Gabriel, at Memphis, October 17, 2020) (AAC record)
- Most wins all-time in American Athletic Conference intra-conference games: 48 (ongoing; AAC record, includes two wins in AAC Championship Game)
- Most victories by a senior class: 41 (tied with 2019 Sr. class)

=== American Athletic Conference honors ===
==== Offensive Player of the Week ====
- September 21: Dillon Gabriel
- September 28: Dillon Gabriel
- October 19: Dillon Gabriel (co-winner)

==== Special Teams Player of the Week ====
- September 28: Daniel Obarski
- November 2: Daniel Obarski

==== American Athletic Conference All-Conference First Team ====
- Matthew Lee, OL
- Jaylon Robinson, WR
- Marlon Williams, WR
- Cole Schneider

==== American Athletic Conference All-Conference Second Team ====
- Otis Anderson Jr., RB/WR/KR
- Dillon Gabriel, QB
- Aaron Robinson, DB

==== American Athletic Conference All-Conference Honorable Team ====
- Lokahi Pauole, OL

=== National awards and honors ===
- Walter Camp Award FBS Offensive Player of the Week (Week 3) — Dillon Gabriel
- Davey O'Brien Award National Quarterback of the Week (Week 3) — Dillon Gabriel
- William V. Campbell Trophy Semifinalist — Greg McCrae
- Manning Award Quarterback of the Week — Dillon Gabriel (September 21, October 26, November 30)
- Maxwell Award (semifinalist) — Dillon Gabriel
- Davey O'Brien Award (semifinalist) — Dillon Gabriel
- Jim Thorpe Award (semifinalist) — Richie Grant
- Chuck Bednarik Award (semifinalist) — Richie Grant
- Fred Biletnikoff Award (semifinalist) — Marlon Williams

== Players drafted into the NFL ==
Round	Pick	Player	Position	NFL Club
2	40	Richie Grant	S	Atlanta Falcons
3	71	Aaron Robinson	CB	New York Giants
4	141	Jacob Harris	WR	Los Angeles Rams
6	223	Tay Gowan	CB	Arizona Cardinals
7	242	Tre Nixon	WR	New England Patriots

Additionally, two players signed as an undrafted free agent:

Name	Position	Team
Otis Anderson Jr.	RB	Los Angeles Rams
Marlon Williams	WR	Houston Texans
