= Anthony Tucker (American football) =

American football player and coach (born 1976)

Mississippi State Bulldogs
- Title: Assistant head coach & running backs coach

Personal information
- Born: February 27, 1976 (age 50); Fort Carson, Colorado Springs, Colorado, U.S.
- Listed height: 6 ft 0 in (1.83 m)
- Listed weight: 190 lb (86 kg)

Career information
- High school: Los Alamitos (CA)
- College: Fresno State
- NFL draft: 1999: undrafted

Career history

Playing
- New York Giants (1999–2000)*; Amsterdam Admirals (2001); St. Louis Rams (2002)*
- * Offseason or practice squad member only

Coaching
- Lakewood HS (CA) (2006–2009) Offensive coordinator & wide receivers coach; Colorado (2010) Offensive technical assistant; Idaho State (2011–2012) Wide receivers coach; Arkansas State (2013) Wide receivers coach; Arkansas State (2014–2015) Running backs coach; Maryland (2016–2017) Running backs coach; UCF (2018) Running backs coach; UCF (2019) Passing game coordinator & running backs coach; UCF (2020) Co-offensive coordinator & running backs coach; Utah State (2021–2022) Offensive coordinator & quarterbacks coach; Indiana (2023) Co-offensive coordinator & wide receivers coach; Mississippi State (2024–present) Assistant head coach & running backs coach

Anthony Tucker (born February 27, 1976) is an American college football coach and former wide receiver. He is the assistant head coach and running backs coach for Mississippi State University, positions he has held since 2024.

== Playing career ==
Tucker played college football at Fresno State from 1994 to 1998 before signing with the New York Giants as an undrafted free agent in 1999. He was released by the Giants and signed with their practice squad multiple times over a period of two seasons before being loaned out to the Amsterdam Admirals of NFL Europe in 2001. Tucker was briefly a member of the St. Louis Rams in 2002 before he suffered a career-ending injury.

== Coaching career ==
Tucker began his coaching career at Lakewood High School in California at the request of one of his friends, who took over as the head coach of the football team. From there, Tucker went on to coach at Colorado as an offensive technical assistant before moving on to Idaho State to coach wide receivers. He also coached at Arkansas State before going on to joining the coaching staff at Maryland as running backs coach.

=== UCF ===
Tucker was named the running backs coach at UCF in December 2017, on Josh Heupel's inaugural coaching staff. After being promoted to passing game coordinator in 2019, Tucker was named co-offensive coordinator in 2020, splitting coordinator duties with Alex Golesh.

=== Utah State ===
Tucker was named the offensive coordinator and quarterbacks coach at Utah State in 2021. The move reunited him with Blake Anderson, who he worked under at Arkansas State.

=== Indiana ===
On February 18, 2023, Tucker was named co-offensive coordinator and wide receivers coach at Indiana.

=== Mississippi State ===
On December 2, 2023, Tucker was named assistant head coach at Mississippi State.
