= 2020 Boca Raton Bowl =

Postseason college football bowl game

2020 RoofClaim.com Boca Raton Bowl
- 7th Boca Raton Bowl
UCF Knights	BYU Cougars
(6–3)	(10–1)
The American	Independent
23	49
Head coach: Josh Heupel	Head coach: Kalani Sitake
	AP / Coaches / CFP; 13 / 15 / 16
	1	2	3	4	Total
UCF	0	10	7	6	23
BYU	21	14	14	0	49
- Date: December 22, 2020
- Season: 2020
- Stadium: FAU Stadium
- Location: Boca Raton, Florida
- MVP: Offense: Zach Wilson (QB, BYU); Defense: Keenan Pili (LB, BYU); Sp.Teams: Caleb Christensen (KR, BYU)
- Favorite: BYU by 4.5
- Referee: Tim O'Dey (MAC)
- Attendance: 6,000

United States TV coverage
- Network: ESPN & ESPN Radio
- Announcers: Dave Neal (play-by-play), D. J. Shockley (analyst), Lericia Harris (sideline) (ESPN); Chris Carlin (play-by-play) and Craig Haubert (analyst) (ESPN Radio)

International TV coverage
- Network: ESPN Deportes

The 2020 Boca Raton Bowl was a college football bowl game played on December 22, 2020, with kickoff at for 7:00 p.m. EST on ESPN. It was the seventh edition of the Boca Raton Bowl, and was one of the 2020–21 bowl games concluding the 2020 FBS football season. Sponsored by roofing repair company RoofClaim.com, the game was officially known as the RoofClaim.com Boca Raton Bowl.

== Teams ==
The 2020 Boca Raton Bowl was contested by the BYU Cougars, who competed as an independent, and the UCF Knights, from the American Athletic Conference. The two teams had met twice previously, with the series tied 1–1. The teams' last meeting had been in 2014; UCF won, 31–24. This was the teams' first meeting in a bowl game, and each team's first appearance in the Boca Raton Bowl.

=== BYU ===
On December 14, BYU accepted a bid to the bowl. The Cougars entered the bowl with a record of 10–1; they were ranked as high as number 8 in the AP Poll during the season.

=== UCF ===
On December 7, UCF of The American accepted a bid to the bowl. The Knights entered the bowl with a record of 6–3 (5–3 in conference play); they were ranked as high as number 11 in the AP Poll during the season.

== Game summary ==
2020 RoofClaim.com Boca Raton Bowl

Quarter	1	2	3	4	Total
UCF	0	10	7	6	23
No. 16 BYU	21	14	14	0	49

at FAU Stadium • Boca Raton, Florida

- Date: Tuesday, December 22, 2020
- Game time: 7:00 p.m. EST
- TV announcers (ESPN): Dave Neal (play-by-play), D.J. Shockley (analyst), Lericia Harris (sideline)
- ESPN game summary

Game information

First quarter

- (13:20) BYU – Zach Wilson 15 yard rush, Josh Oldroyd kick (Drive: 5 plays, 87 yards, 1:40; BYU 7–0)
- (11:10) BYU – Isaac Rex 36 yard pass from Zach Wilson, Josh Oldroyd kick (Drive: 4 plays, 72 yards, 1:13; BYU 14–0)
- (0:25) BYU – Zach Wilson 4 yard rush, Jake Oldroyd kick (Drive: 4 plays, 76 yards, 1:42; BYU 21–0)

Second quarter

- (10:11) UCF – Greg McCrae 5 yard rush, Daniel Obarski kick (Drive: 15 plays, 80 yards, 5:14; BYU 21–7)
- (7:11) BYU – Isaac Rex 27 yard pass from Zach Wilson, Jake Oldroyd kick (Drive: 7 plays, 68 yards, 3:00; BYU 28–7)
- (3:31) BYU – Nail Pau'u 35 yard pass from Zach Wilson, Jake Oldroyd kick (Drive: 6 plays, 87 yards, 2:54; BYU 35–7)
- (0:19) UCF – Daniel Obarski 35 yard field goal (Drive: 12 plays, 57 yards, 3:12; BYU 35–10)

Third quarter

- (13:11) BYU – Tyler Allgeier 39 yard rush, Jake Oldroyd kick (Drive: 2 plays, 50 yards, 0:45; BYU 42–10)
- (9:31) BYU – Gunner Romney 6 yard rush, Jake Oldroyd kick (Drive: 8 plays, 67 yards, 3:11; BYU 49–10)
- (0:05) UCF – Jacob Harris 21 yard pass from Dillon Gabriel, Daniel Obarski kick (Drive: 8 plays, 68 yards, 2:58; BYU 49–17)

Fourth quarter

- (7:53) UCF – Jaylon Robinson 21 yard pass from Dillon Gabriel, two-point conversion failed (Drive: 14 plays, 82 yards, 5:09; BYU 49–23)

=== Statistics ===
Statistics	UCF	BYU
First downs	28	34
Plays–yards	88–411	73–655
Rushes–yards	43–194	38–214
Passing yards	217	441
Passing: comp–att–int	21–45–0	27–35–0
Time of possession	26:38	33:22

Team	Category	Player	Statistics
UCF	Passing	Dillon Gabriel	21-for-45, 217 yards, 2 TD
UCF	Rushing	Greg McCrae	77 yards on 18 carries, 1 TD
UCF	Receiving	Jacob Harris	67 yards on 4 receptions, 1 TD
BYU	Passing	Zach Wilson	26-for-34, 425 yards, 3 TD
BYU	Rushing	Tyler Allgeier	173 yards on 19 carries, 1 TD
BYU	Receiving	Isaac Rex	96 yards on 5 receptions, 2 TD
