= Dillon Gabriel =

American football player (born 2000)

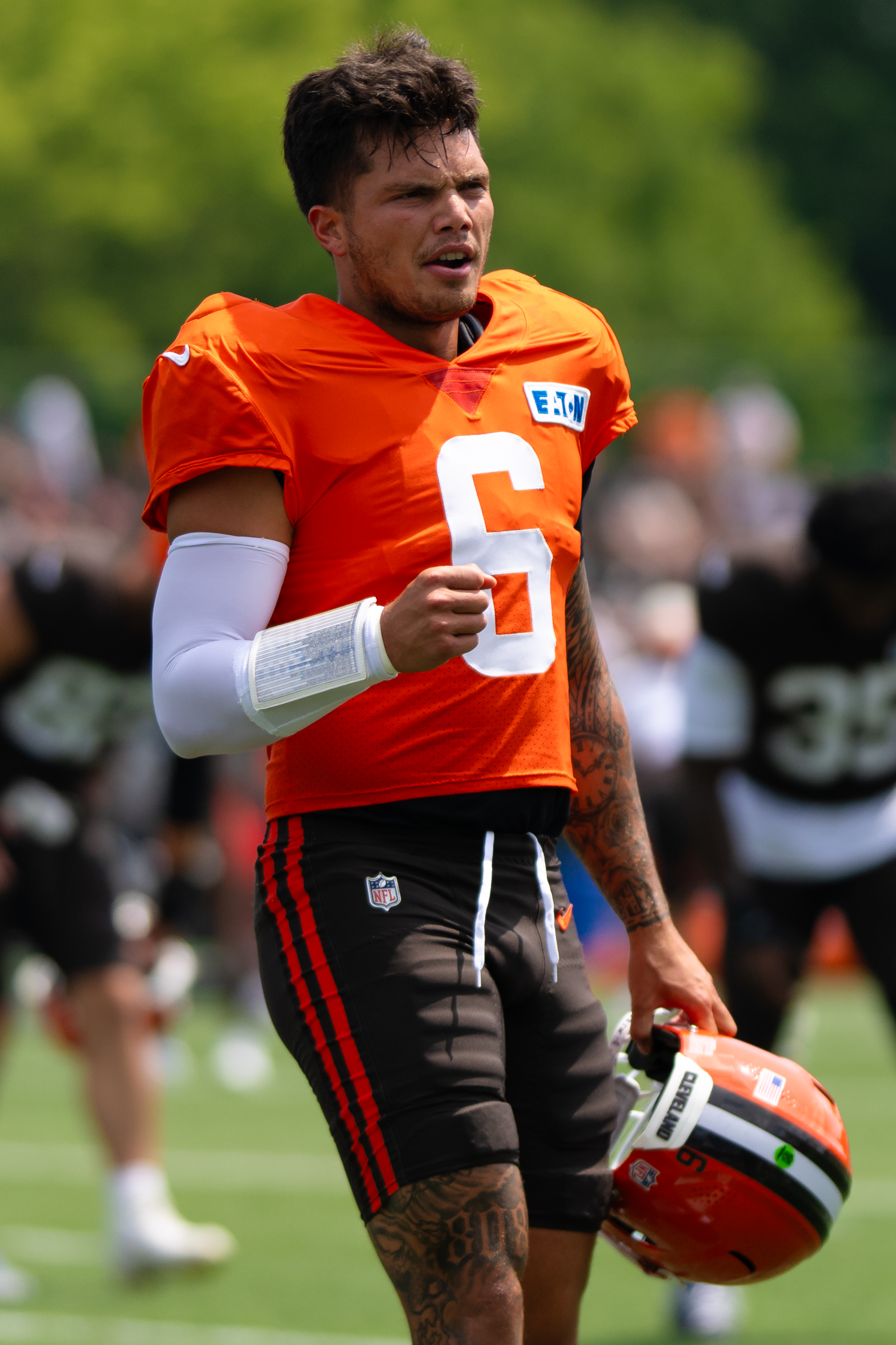
- Gabriel during training camp with the Cleveland Browns in 2026

No. 6 – Cleveland Browns
- Position: Quarterback
- Roster status: Active

Personal information
- Born: December 28, 2000 (age 25); Mililani, Hawaii, U.S.
- Listed height: 5 ft 11 in (1.80 m)
- Listed weight: 205 lb (93 kg)

Career information
- High school: Mililani (HI)
- College: UCF (2019–2021); Oklahoma (2022–2023); Oregon (2024)
- NFL draft: 2025: 3rd round, 94th overall pick

Career history
- Cleveland Browns (2025–present)

Awards and highlights
- First-team All-American (2024); Big Ten Most Valuable Player (2024); Big Ten Offensive Player of the Year (2024); Big Ten Quarterback of the Year (2024); Big 12 Offensive Newcomer of the Year (2022); First-team All-Big Ten (2024); First-team All-Big 12 (2023); Second-team All-Big 12 (2022); Second-team All-AAC (2020); NCAA (FBS) records: Most career touchdown passes: 155 (tied; Case Keenum); Most career touchdowns responsible for: 189; Most career points responsible for: 1,136

Career NFL statistics as of 2025
- Passing attempts: 185
- Passing completions: 110
- Completion percentage: 59.5%
- TD–INT: 7–2
- Passing yards: 937
- Passer rating: 80.8
- Rushing yards: 86
- Stats at Pro Football Reference

Dillon Gabriel (born December 28, 2000) is an American professional football quarterback for the Cleveland Browns of the National Football League (NFL). He played his first three seasons of college football for the UCF Knights and his next two with the Oklahoma Sooners. In his final college season in 2024, he was a member of the Oregon Ducks, earning first-team All-American honors and being named Big Ten Most Valuable Player. Gabriel concluded his college career with 155 touchdown passes, tying the FBS record held by Case Keenum. He was selected by the Browns in the third round of the 2025 NFL draft.

== Early life ==
Gabriel was born on December 28, 2000, in Mililani, Hawaii. He comes from a family with a strong athletic background. His mother, Dori Gabriel, played college softball for the Loyola Marymount Lions. His father, Garrett Gabriel, played college football as a quarterback for the Hawaii Rainbow Warriors from 1987 to 1990. Garrett was a four-year letterman and finished his college career as Hawaii's all-time leader in passing yards with 5,631 and total offense with 6,181.

Gabriel grew up playing multiple sports, primarily baseball and football. Although he enjoyed baseball, he found the game slowing down as he got older and gravitated toward football for its faster pace and the rush and excitement it offered. Early in his youth, Gabriel played several positions including safety, running back, and wide receiver, only fully transitioning to the quarterback role between the ages of 10 and 12. His decision to focus on playing quarterback was partly inspired by his father, but emphasizes that pressure was never put on him.

Gabriel spent his early education years attending private schools, notably spending his seventh and eighth grade years at Punahou School in Honolulu, Hawaii. It wasn't until high school that he attended public schools.

== High school career ==
Gabriel attended Mililani High School in Mililani, Hawaii, graduating in 2019. During his senior year, he maintained a 3.91 GPA and earned recognition as the 2018–19 Gatorade Hawaii Football Player of the Year, Honolulu Star-Advertiser All-State Offensive Player of the Year, and OIA Offensive Player of the Year after passing for 3,754 yards and 38 touchdowns as a quarterback. He led the Mililani Trojans to a 10–3 record and an appearance in the 2018 HHSAA Division I-Open Football State Championship game, the highest level of high school football in Hawaii, where the team finished second in the state after a 38–17 loss to the Saint Louis Crusaders. Gabriel concluded his high school career with three first-team All-OIA selections, a Hawaii state record of 9,848 passing yards that surpassed the previous mark set by NFL Pro Bowler Tua Tagovailoa, and 105 passing touchdowns, which ranked second all-time behind Hawaii quarterback Timmy Chang.

Rated a three-star recruit by 247Sports, Gabriel initially committed to play college football for the Army Black Knights during his senior year of high school. However, after receiving offers from Georgia, UCF, and USC, he decommitted and ultimately chose the University of Central Florida (UCF), drawn by the opportunity to compete for the starting quarterback position and earn immediate playing time. At that time, UCF was conducting an open competition for the starting role following the severe leg injury of McKenzie Milton, Gabriel's close friend and former Mililani teammate, who dislocated his knee during the 2018 season, requiring multiple surgeries and extensive rehabilitation.

== College career ==
=== UCF ===
Gabriel began his collegiate football career with the UCF Knights in 2019 as a true freshman. During preseason camp, he competed for the starting quarterback position against Notre Dame redshirt senior transfer Brandon Wimbush and UCF redshirt freshman Quadry Jones. The competition was held to find a replacement for McKenzie Milton, who was sidelined by a severe leg injury sustained late in the 2018 season. Milton's previous backup, Darriel Mack Jr., was also unavailable due to a broken ankle suffered before the start of the season. Although the competition was close, Wimbush earned the starting role, while Gabriel served as the backup quarterback initially.

Gabriel made his collegiate debut on August 29, 2019, in UCF's season opener against Florida A&M. He entered the game late in the first quarter as a substitute for starting quarterback Wimbush, completing 9 of 13 passes for 127 yards and three touchdowns, helping UCF secure a 62–0 victory. Following this performance, Gabriel was named the starting quarterback and started the remaining 12 games of the season. He made his first career start on September 7 against Florida Atlantic, completing 7 of 19 passes for 245 yards and two touchdowns in a 48–14 victory. The season concluded with a 48–25 victory over Marshall in the 2019 Gasparilla Bowl, where Gabriel was named Most Valuable Player (MVP) after completing 14 of 24 passes for 260 yards and two touchdowns. Throughout the season, Gabriel led UCF to a 10–3 overall record. He finished the season having completed 236 of 398 passes for 3,653 yards, setting a school record for passing yards in a season by a freshman, with 29 touchdowns and seven interceptions.

During his sophomore season, Gabriel led UCF to a 6–4 record. He concluded the season by playing in the 2020 Boca Raton Bowl, where he completed 21 of 45 passes for 217 yards and two touchdowns in a 49–23 loss to BYU.

During his junior season, Gabriel led UCF to a 2–0 record before sustaining an injury in the third game of the regular season against Louisville on September 17, 2021. With five seconds remaining in the final play and UCF trailing 42–35, the team attempted a multi-lateral touchdown but was penalized for an illegal forward pass, securing the victory for Louisville. Gabriel was injured on the play after landing on his left shoulder, his throwing arm, and was carried off the field. He was later seen with his left arm in a sling, and X-rays revealed a broken left clavicle. Although the injury did not require surgery, it ended his season prematurely. Later that season, Gabriel announced on social media that he would be transferring from UCF and entered the NCAA transfer portal on November 27, 2021.

=== Oklahoma ===
Gabriel initially announced he would transfer to UCLA on December 16, 2021. However, less than three weeks later, on January 3, 2022, he announced he would instead transfer to Oklahoma.

After two seasons with Oklahoma, Gabriel announced that he would be transferring and entered the NCAA transfer portal on December 4, 2023.

=== Oregon ===
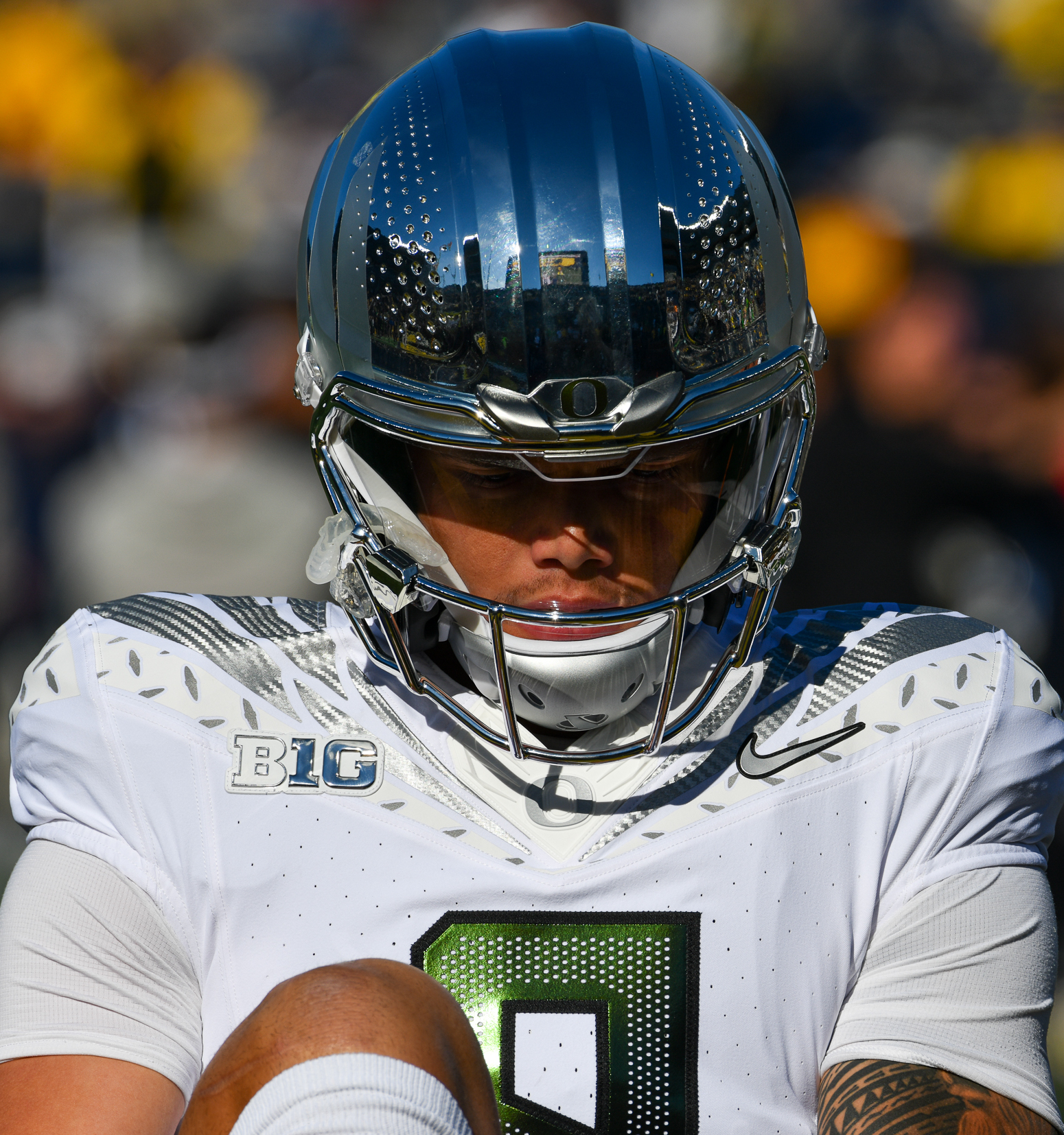
Gabriel with the Oregon Ducks in 2024

Gabriel committed to transfer to Oregon on December 9, 2023, five days after entering the NCAA transfer portal, for his final year of collegiate eligibility, his sixth overall. This extra year resulted from the NCAA's decision to grant college football players an additional season of eligibility because of the COVID-19 pandemic. Gabriel also used a redshirt season after sustaining a broken left clavicle that sidelined him for the 2021 season.

Gabriel made his debut for Oregon in the season opener against Idaho on August 31, 2024. Oregon won the game 24–14, with Gabriel throwing for 380 yards and two touchdowns. With this performance, he became the eighth quarterback in Football Bowl Subdivision (FBS) history to surpass 15,000 career passing yards. Gabriel threw for 291 yards and three touchdowns in Oregon's 38–9 victory over Illinois on October 26. With this performance, he surpassed Hawaii quarterback Timmy Chang to move into second place on the FBS career passing yards list and also passed Boise State quarterback Kellen Moore to claim second place on the FBS career passing touchdowns list. Gabriel played his final college football game in the 2025 Rose Bowl, a College Football Playoff (CFP) quarterfinal, on January 1, 2025. Despite entering the playoffs with Oregon holding an undefeated 13–0 record and finishing first in the Big Ten Conference, the team ended its season with a 41–21 loss to Ohio State. Gabriel threw for 299 yards and two touchdowns in the game, tying Houston quarterback Case Keenum for the FBS career passing touchdowns record, with both quarterbacks now sharing the record at 155.

At the conclusion of the 2024 regular season, Gabriel was nominated for the Heisman Trophy in recognition of his impressive statistics and leadership. He finished third in the voting, behind winner Travis Hunter of Colorado and runner-up Ashton Jeanty of Boise State, and ahead of Miami quarterback Cam Ward.

== Professional career ==
Pre-draft measurables
Height	Weight	Arm length	Hand span	Wingspan
5 ft 11 1/8 in (1.81 m)	205 lb (93 kg)	29 5/8 in (0.75 m)	9 1/4 in (0.23 m)	6 ft 1 in (1.85 m)
All values from NFL Combine

Gabriel was selected 94th overall by the Cleveland Browns in the third round of the 2025 NFL draft. The Browns acquired this pick through a trade that involved sending wide receiver Amari Cooper and a 2025 sixth-round pick, originally belonging to the Detroit Lions, to the Buffalo Bills. In return, the Browns received a 2025 third-round pick and a 2026 seventh-round pick.

On August 26, 2025, the Browns announced that Gabriel would serve as the backup quarterback to Joe Flacco. Gabriel made his National Football League (NFL) debut on September 14, during Week 2 against the Baltimore Ravens. He entered the game late in the fourth quarter, replacing Flacco while the Browns were trailing 41–10. Gabriel completed all three of his pass attempts for a total of 19 yards. He recorded his first career touchdown on an eight-yard pass to Dylan Sampson with 1:50 remaining in the game. The Browns ultimately lost the game 41–17 to the Ravens.

On October 1, 2025, Gabriel was announced as the starting quarterback for the Browns ahead of Week 5, replacing Flacco. He made his first career start on October 5, in a game against the Minnesota Vikings held in London, England. This made him the first quarterback to have his initial NFL start outside the United States. The Browns lost the game 21–17. Gabriel completed 19 of 33 passes for 190 yards and two touchdowns. He was sacked twice for a loss of eight yards and did not throw any interceptions. His performance earned him a nomination for NFL Rookie of the Week honors for Week 5.

On November 16, 2025, Gabriel sustained a concussion during the Week 11 game against the Baltimore Ravens. He experienced concussion symptoms during halftime and sought evaluation from the trainers. In accordance with the NFL concussion protocol, Gabriel was assessed and ruled out for the remainder of the game. This allowed backup quarterback Shedeur Sanders to make his regular season debut in the second half. In the first half, Gabriel completed 7 of 10 passes for 68 yards, with no touchdowns, and was sacked once for a loss of seven yards. Despite leading 16–10 at halftime, the Browns ultimately lost the game 23–16 to the Ravens.

On August 30, 2026, Gabriel was placed on injured reserve with a back injury. On October 26, 2026, Gabriel was activated from injured reserve.

== Career statistics ==
=== NFL ===
Year	Team	Games			Passing									Rushing					Sacks		Fumbles	
Year	Team	GP	GS	Record	Cmp	Att	Pct	Yds	Avg	Lng	TD	Int	Rtg	Att	Yds	Avg	Lng	TD	Sck	Yds	Fum	Lost
2025	CLE	10	6	1–5	110	185	59.5	937	5.1	26	7	2	80.6	14	86	6.1	19	0	19	127	0	0
Career		10	6	1–5	110	185	59.5	937	5.1	26	7	2	80.6	14	86	6.1	19	0	19	127	0	0

=== College ===
Legend
FBS record
Led NCAA Division I FBS

Year	Team	Games			Passing								Rushing			
Year	Team	GP	GS	Record	Cmp	Att	Pct	Yds	Y/A	TD	Int	Rtg	Att	Yds	Avg	TD
2019	UCF	13	12	9–3	236	398	59.3	3,653	9.2	29	7	156.9	71	78	1.1	4
2020	UCF	10	10	6–4	248	413	60.0	3,570	8.6	32	4	156.3	72	169	2.3	2
2021	UCF	3	3	2–1	70	102	68.6	814	8.0	9	3	159.2	24	125	5.2	2
2022	Oklahoma	12	12	6–6	230	367	62.7	3,168	8.6	25	6	154.4	89	315	3.5	6
2023	Oklahoma	12	12	10–2	266	384	69.3	3,660	9.5	30	6	172.0	93	373	4.0	12
2024	Oregon	14	14	13–1	326	447	72.9	3,857	8.6	30	6	164.9	75	149	2.0	7
Career		64	63	46–17	1,376	2,111	65.2	18,722	8.9	155	32	160.9	424	1,209	2.9	33

== Personal life ==
Gabriel is of Filipino and Native Hawaiian descent. Due to his Hawaiian heritage, he grew up as a fan of fellow Oregon alumnus and NFL quarterback Marcus Mariota, who has served as a mentor throughout his career.

Gabriel is the middle of three brothers, all athletes named after former NFL players. He was named after running back Corey Dillon. His older brother Garrison, named after running back Garrison Hearst, played college volleyball for the OCC Pirates and serves as Gabriel's business manager. His younger brother Roman, named after Roman Gabriel, the Filipino-American quarterback who won the NFL Most Valuable Player (MVP) award in 1969, plays college basketball for the Bushnell Beacons.

Gabriel is engaged to his childhood sweetheart, Zo Caswell, a fellow Hawaii native whom he met while attending middle school at Punahou School in Honolulu, Hawaii. He proposed to her on September 1, 2024, the day after his debut for Oregon.
