= 2019 Gasparilla Bowl =

Postseason college football bowl game

2019 Bad Boy Mowers Gasparilla Bowl
- 12th Gasparilla Bowl
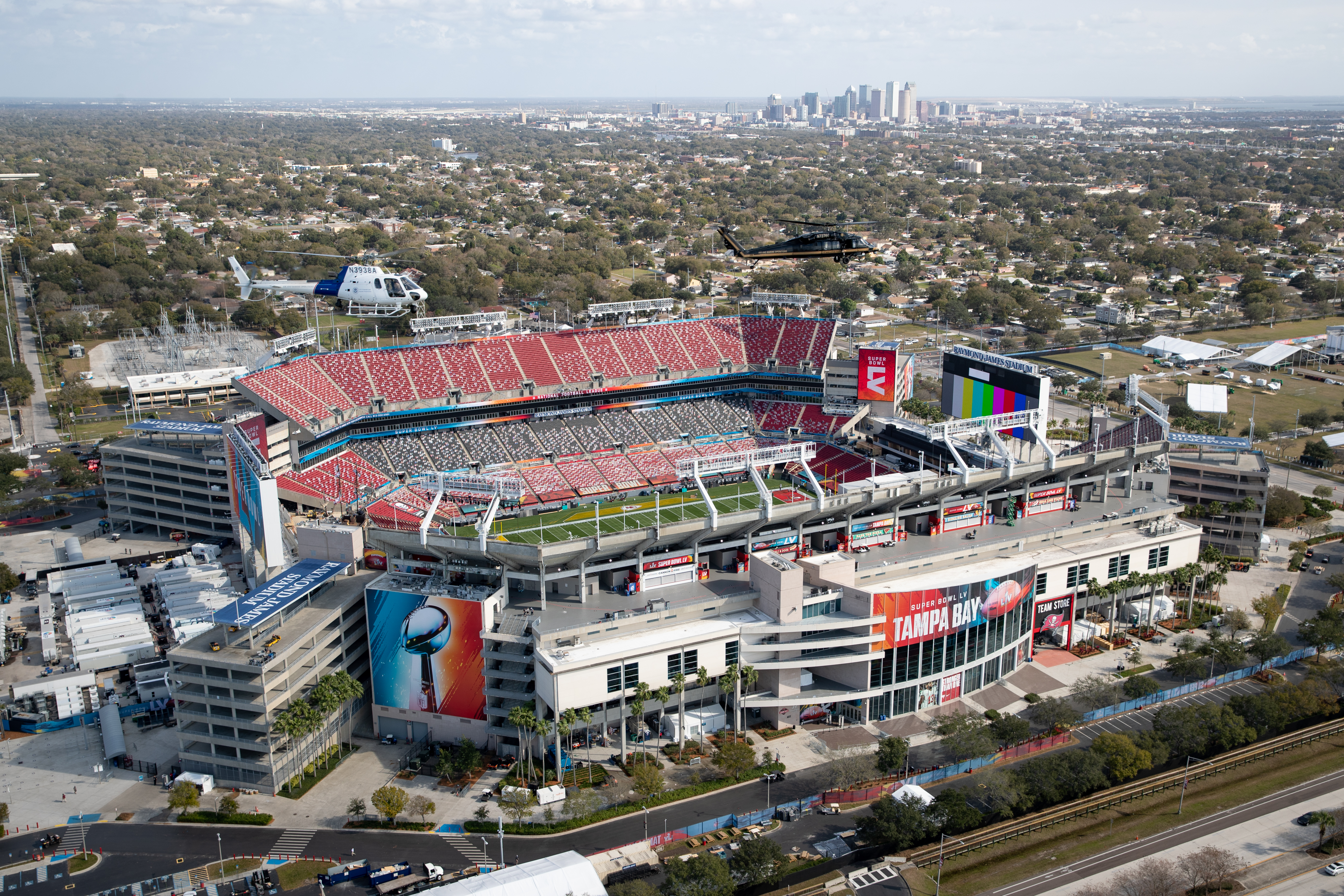
- Raymond James Stadium in Tampa, Florida, hosted the Gasparilla Bowl.
UCF Knights	Marshall Thundering Herd
(9–3)	(8–4)
The American	C-USA
48	25
Head coach: Josh Heupel	Head coach: Doc Holliday
	1	2	3	4	Total
UCF	21	3	21	3	48
Marshall	0	7	18	0	25
- Date: December 23, 2019
- Season: 2019
- Stadium: Raymond James Stadium
- Location: Tampa, Florida
- MVP: Dillon Gabriel (QB, UCF)
- Favorite: UCF by 15.5
- Referee: Mike Cannon (Big Ten)
- Attendance: 28,987 (Note: 28,987 per game day summary; 33,539 per post-game summary)
- Payout: US$1,125,000

United States TV coverage
- Network: ESPN
- Announcers: Roy Philpott (play-by-play), Kelly Stouffer (analyst) and Lauren Sisler (sideline)

International TV coverage
- Network: ESPN Brasil
- Announcers: Matheus Pinheiro (play-by-play); Weinny Eirado (analyst)

The 2019 Gasparilla Bowl was a college football bowl game played on December 23, 2019, with kickoff at 2:30 p.m. EST on ESPN. It was the 12th edition of the Gasparilla Bowl, although only the third under that name, and one of the 2019–20 bowl games concluding the 2019 FBS football season. Sponsored by lawn mower manufacturing company Bad Boy Mowers, the game was officially known as the Bad Boy Mowers Gasparilla Bowl.

== Teams ==
The game matched the UCF Knights of the American Athletic Conference (The American) and the Marshall Thundering Herd of Conference USA (C–USA). It was the fourth appearance in the Gasparilla Bowl for both teams (although their first Gasparilla Bowl against each other), leading all teams in Gasparilla Bowl appearances.

It was the twelfth overall meeting between UCF and Marshall; entering the game, UCF led the all-time series, 8–3. From 2002 to 2012, UCF and Marshall were in the same conference; they both played in the Mid-American Conference from 2002 to 2004, then both joined C–USA in 2005 and played in that conference until UCF left to join The American in 2013.

=== UCF Knights ===
UCF entered the bowl with a 9–3 record (6–2 in conference), having finished in second place in the East Division of The American.

=== Marshall Thundering Herd ===
Marshall entered the game with an 8–4 record (6–2 in conference); they finished tied for second in the East Division of C–USA. The Thundering Herd were the defending Gasparilla Bowl champions, their 2018 team having won that season's Gasparilla Bowl over South Florida, 38–20.

== Game summary ==
2019 Bad Boy Mowers Gasparilla Bowl

Quarter	1	2	3	4	Total
UCF	21	3	21	3	48
Marshall	0	7	18	0	25

at Raymond James Stadium • Tampa, Florida

- Date: Monday, December 23, 2019
- Game time: 2:30 p.m. EST
- Game weather: Cloudy with rain • Temperature: 69 °F (21 °C) • Wind: W 16 mph
- Game attendance: 28,987
- Referee: Mike Cannon
- TV announcers (ESPN): Roy Philpott (play-by-play), Kelly Stouffer (analyst) and Lauren Sisler (sideline)
- ESPN game summary

Game information

First Quarter

- (14:04) UCF – Richie Grant 39 yard interception return, Dylan Barnas kick (UCF 7–0)
- (9:12) UCF – Greg McCrae 26 yard rush, Dylan Barnas kick (Drive: 6 plays, 65 yards, 1:23; UCF 14–0)
- (7:00) UCF – Tre'Mon Morris-Brash 45 yard fumble return, Dylan Barnas kick (UCF 21–0)

Second Quarter

- (12:28) MRSH – Micah Abraham 75 yard interception return, Justin Rohrwasser kick (UCF 21–7)
- (0:00) UCF – Dylan Barnas 36 yard field goal (Drive: 10 plays, 75 yards, 3:12; UCF 24–7)

Third Quarter

- (12:50) UCF – Dillon Gabriel 35 yard pass to Otis Anderson Jr., Dylan Barnas kick (Drive: 9 plays, 75 yards, 2:10; UCF 31–7)
- (9:33) MRSH – Isaiah Green 3 yard rush, Justin Rohrwasser kick (Drive: 7 plays, 75 yards, 3:17; UCF 31–14)
- (7:10) UCF – Dillon Gabriel 3 yard rush, Dylan Barnas kick (Drive: 8 plays, 75 yards, 2:33; UCF 38–14)
- (6:51) MRSH – Isaiah Green 70 yard pass to Willie Johnson, 2-point pass good (Drive: 1 play, 70 yards, 0:19; UCF 38–22)
- (6:39) UCF – Dillon Gabriel 75 yard pass to Marlon Williams, Dylan Barnas kick (Drive: 1 play, 75 yards, 0:12; UCF 45–22)
- (1:06) MRSH – Justin Rohrwasser 50 yard field goal (Drive: 10 plays, 27 yards, 5:31; UCF 45–25)

Fourth Quarter

- (9:01) UCF – Dylan Barnas 30 yard field goal (Drive: 10 plays, 20 yards, 4:59; UCF 48–25)

=== Statistics ===
Statistics	UCF	MRSH
First downs	25	19
Plays–yards	78–587	69–361
Rushes–yards	47–310	44–167
Passing yards	277	194
Passing: comp–att–int	17–31–1	11–25–2
Turnovers		
Time of possession	27:40	32:20

Team	Category	Player	Statistics
UCF	Passing	Dillon Gabriel	14/24, 260 yards, 2 TD
UCF	Rushing	Greg McCrae	14 carries, 80 yards, 1 TD
UCF	Receiving	Marlon Williams	7 receptions, 132 yards, 1 TD
Marshall	Passing	Isaiah Green	9/23, 173 yards, 1 TD, 1 INT
Marshall	Rushing	Brenden Knox	26 carries, 103 yards
Marshall	Receiving	Obi Obialo	4 receptions, 45 yards
