= StatMuse =

American sports statistics website

- StatMuse logo
- Website type: Sports and financial statistics search
- Available in: English
- Founded: 2014; 12 years ago
- Headquarters: San Francisco, California, United States
- Founders: Adam Elmore; Eli Dawson
- Website: statmuse.com

StatMuse Inc. is an American artificial intelligence company founded in 2014. It operates an eponymous website that hosts a database of sports statistics covering the four major North American sports leagues, the Women's National Basketball Association (WNBA), NCAA Division I men's basketball, NCAA Division I Football Bowl Subdivision, the Big Five association football leagues in Europe, and various professional golf tours.

== History ==
The company was founded by friends Adam Elmore and Eli Dawson in 2014. In email correspondence to the Springfield News-Leader, Elmore detailed that he and Dawson, fans of the National Basketball Association (NBA), were compelled to create StatMuse after they realized there was no online platform where they could search "Lebron James most points" [sic] and quickly get a result "showing his highest scoring games." As a startup, the company's goal was to utilize a type of artificial intelligence called natural language processing (NLP) for sports.

In 2015, the company was part of the second group of startups accepted into the Disney Accelerator program. The company secured support from several investors, including The Walt Disney Company, Techstars, Allen & Company, the NFL Players Association, Greycroft and former NBA Commissioner David Stern. As part of their partnership with Disney, StatMuse signed a content deal with ESPN (owned by Disney) to provide stats content on social media and television during the 2015–16 NBA season.

Initially, the company only had stats available for the NBA, but eventually expanded to provide stats for the other major North American sports leagues. The company's initial demographic was players of fantasy sports, but it eventually expanded to target general sports fans as well. StatMuse offers responses to user queries in the voices of sports-related public figures. Dawson shared with VentureBeat that StatMuse brings people in and records them saying different words and phrases. These celebrity voices were made accessible through Google's Google Assistant service, Microsoft's Cortana virtual assistant, and Amazon's Echo devices.

The company launched its phone app in September 2017. The app allows users to access StatMuse's sports statistics database by submitting queries in their natural language. Upon the launch of the phone app, Fitz Tepper of TechCrunch wrote that: "The technology isn't perfect – some of the pauses between words are a bit awkward, making it clear that some phrases are being stitched together on the fly. But this is the exception, and on the whole, most responses sound pretty good." StatMuse plug-ins for Slack and Facebook Messenger were also made, providing text-based sports stats. In 2019, StatMuse received investment from the Google Assistant Investment program.

In May 2021, StatMuse released a public beta of StatMuse Money.

In May 2023, StatMuse launched StatMuse+, a paid pilot membership priced at $20 per month. Members got unlimited prompts, twice as much data in results, no ads, a personal search history and early access to new features. Later that month, free users were limited to 10 prompts a day.

In January 2024, the service launched a Premier League version of the website dubbed StatMuse FC. At launch, the company said it planned to add more leagues. As of October 2026, the football section also covers La Liga, the Bundesliga, Serie A and the UEFA Champions League.

In October 2026, StatMuse released a Model Context Protocol (MCP) server and a natural language API in beta for StatMuse+ members.
