= Josh Heupel =

American football player and coach

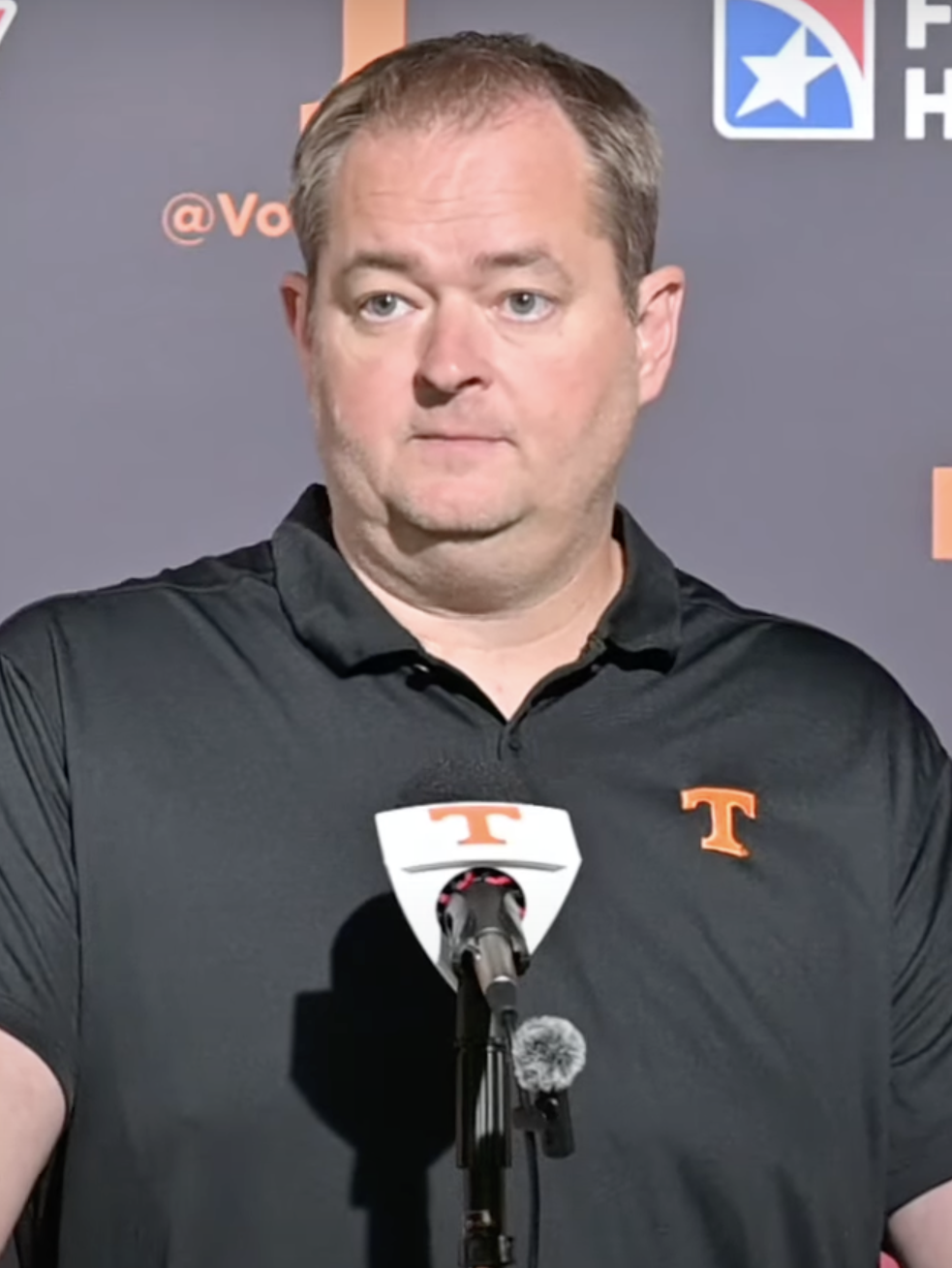
- Heupel in 2024

Current position
- Title: Head coach
- Team: Tennessee
- Conference: SEC
- Record: 54–22

Biographical details
- Born: March 22, 1978 (age 48); Aberdeen, South Dakota, U.S.
- Education: University of Oklahoma

Playing career
- 1996–1997: Weber State
- 1998: Snow
- 1999–2000: Oklahoma
- 2001: Miami Dolphins (Note: Offseason and/or practice squad member only.)
- 2002: Green Bay Packers
- Position: Quarterback

Coaching career (HC unless noted)
- 2004: Oklahoma (GA)
- 2005: Arizona (TE)
- 2006–2010: Oklahoma (QB)
- 2011–2014: Oklahoma (co-OC/QB)
- 2015: Utah State (AHC/OC/QB)
- 2016–2017: Missouri (OC/QB)
- 2018–2020: UCF
- 2021–present: Tennessee

Head coaching record
- Overall: 83–30
- Bowls: 3–4
- Tournaments: 0–1

Accomplishments and honors

Championships
- As a coach: American Athletic Conference (2018); AAC East division (2018); As a player: BCS national (2000)

Awards
- As a coach: SEC Coach of the Year (2022); As a player: Walter Camp Award (2000); AP College Football Player of the Year (2000); Archie Griffin Award (2000); Quarterback of the Year (2000); Chic Harley Award (2000); Consensus All-American (2000); Big 12 Offensive Player of the Year (2000); Big 12 Offensive Newcomer of the Year (1999); First-team All-Big 12 (2000); Second-team All-Big 12 (1999)

Joshua Kenneth Heupel (/ˈhaɪpəl/ HYPE-əl; born March 22, 1978) is an American college football coach and former player who is the head football coach at the University of Tennessee. Previously he was head coach at the University of Central Florida, where he compiled a 28–8 record.

Heupel played college football as a quarterback, most notably for the Oklahoma Sooners. During his playing career at Oklahoma, he was recognized as a consensus All-American, won numerous awards, and led Oklahoma to the 2000 BCS National Championship. After two years unsuccessfully trying to make an NFL roster (featuring brief stints with the Miami Dolphins and the Green Bay Packers), Heupel became a coach. He served as co-offensive coordinator for Oklahoma until January 6, 2015, when he was let go in a restructuring of the program. He was named the assistant head coach, offensive coordinator, and quarterbacks coach for the Utah State University Aggies on January 23, 2015. After one season at USU, he was hired on Barry Odom's staff at Missouri, where he was the offensive coordinator before being hired for his first head coaching position at UCF. In December 2017, Heupel was named the UCF head coach. On January 27, 2021, Heupel was named the 27th head coach at Tennessee.

== Early life ==
Heupel was born and grew up in Aberdeen, South Dakota. His mother, Cindy, was a high school principal, and his father, Ken, was a head football coach at Northern State University. As a child, Josh watched game film with his father.

Josh Heupel attended Central High School in Aberdeen, where he played high school football for the Central Golden Eagles. In the second half of the first game of his sophomore season in 1994, he became the Golden Eagles' quarterback in a scaled-down version of the run and shoot offense. As a senior, he was named South Dakota's player of the year. He got recruiting inquiries from major college football programs at the universities of Houston, Minnesota, Wisconsin and Wyoming, but "it seemed I was always the second or third guy on their list," according to Heupel.

== College career ==
Heupel began his collegiate playing career at Weber State University in Ogden, Utah. He redshirted in 1996 and saw action in four games as a freshman in 1997, but he suffered an ACL injury during spring practice in 1998, pushing him down the team's depth chart. He transferred to Snow College in Ephraim, Utah, where he shared playing time with Fred Salanoa. Heupel passed for 2,308 yards and 28 touchdowns, despite sharing playing time with Salanoa. He later held a scholarship offer from Utah State University, but committed to the University of Oklahoma after meeting with Bob Stoops, the new head coach of the Oklahoma Sooners.

Heupel was the Heisman Trophy runner-up in 2000. He was named Big 12 Offensive Player of the Year. He was an All-American, the AP Player of the Year, and a Walter Camp Award winner. Heupel led the Sooners to an undefeated season and a national championship with a 13–2 victory over Florida State in the 2001 Orange Bowl.

== Professional career ==
Heupel was drafted in the sixth round with the 177th overall pick in the 2001 NFL draft by the Miami Dolphins. Compromised by shoulder tendinitis of his throwing arm, he was relegated to fourth string for the entire preseason and failed to make the team.

He was later signed by the Green Bay Packers in the early 2002 offseason but got released a month before training camp.

== Coaching career ==
=== Assistant coaching ===
Heupel spent the 2004 season as a graduate assistant for Oklahoma under head coach Bob Stoops. In 2005, Heupel was hired as the tight ends coach at the University of Arizona by newly appointed head coach Mike Stoops, Bob's brother and an Oklahoma assistant coach during Heupel's playing days.

Heupel became the quarterbacks coach for Oklahoma in 2006. In that capacity he coached Sooner quarterback Sam Bradford, who won the Heisman Trophy in 2008. On December 13, 2010, Bob Stoops named Heupel and Jay Norvell as co-offensive coordinators at Oklahoma, replacing Kevin Wilson, who had accepted the head coaching job at Indiana. Stoops said Heupel would be in charge of calling offensive plays during games. Heupel's contract was not renewed in January 2015 following an 8–5 season capped by a 40–6 loss to Clemson in 2014 Russell Athletic Bowl.

After his job at Oklahoma, Heupel served as assistant head coach, offensive coordinator and quarterback coach for one season for the Utah State Aggies and as offensive coordinator and quarterback coach for two seasons for the Missouri Tigers.

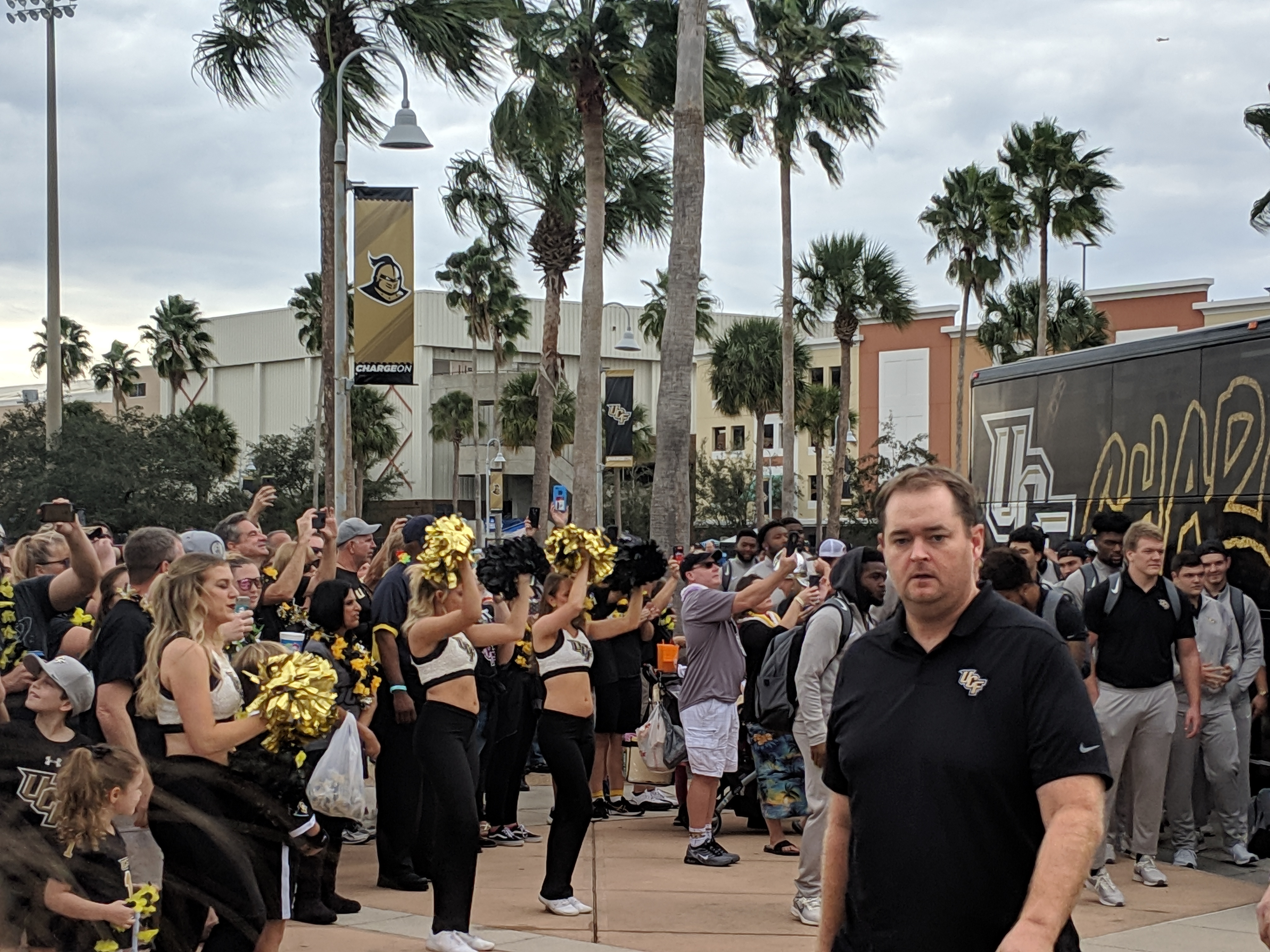
Heupel prior to the 2018 AAC Championship Game

=== UCF ===
Heupel was named head coach of the UCF Knights on December 5, 2017, replacing the departing Scott Frost. In the 2018 season, Heupel led UCF to a 12–1 record and an American Athletic Conference Football Championship Game victory. The Knights appeared in the Fiesta Bowl, where they lost to LSU 40–32.

In the 2019 season, Heupel helped lead the Knights to a 10–3 mark that culminated with a 48–25 victory over Marshall in the Gasparilla Bowl. In the 2020 season, the Knights finished with a 6–4 record in the COVID-19 pandemic shortened season. The Knights appeared in the Boca Raton Bowl and fell 49–23 to BYU.

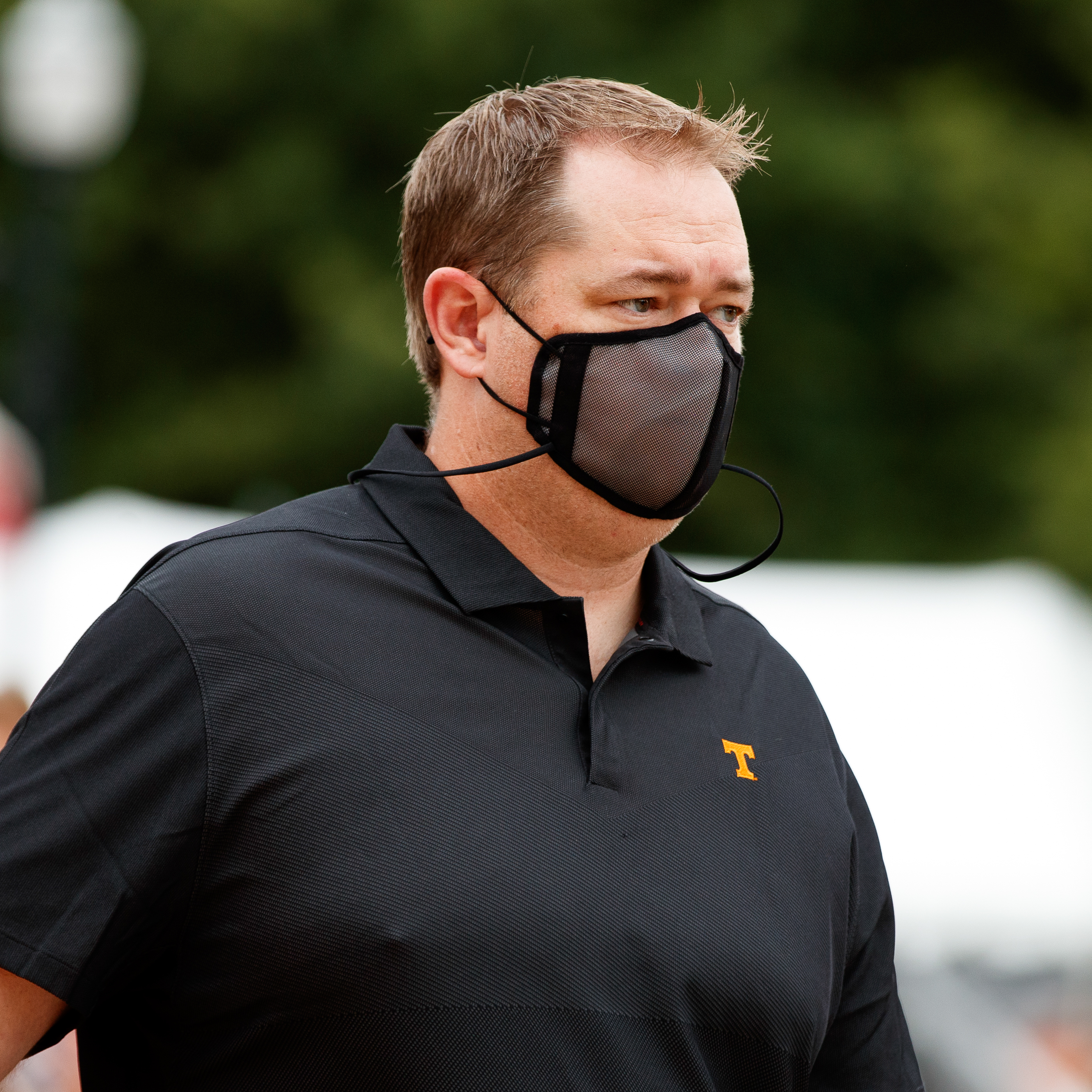
Heupel with Tennessee in 2021

=== Tennessee ===
==== 2021 season ====
Heupel was named the 27th head coach at Tennessee on January 27, 2021. In his first season with Tennessee, Heupel led the Volunteers to a Music City Bowl appearance and a final record of 7–6 (4–4 in conference). Heupel won the Steve Spurrier first year head coach award for the second time, sharing the 2021 award with Shane Beamer.

==== 2022 season ====
In his second year at Tennessee, Heupel led the Vols to a 8–0 start, their best start since 1998, defeating Pitt for the first time ever (0–3 vs the Panthers prior), breaking a five-game losing streak to their rival Florida, a five-game losing streak to conference foe LSU, and a 15-game losing streak to rival Alabama, launching the Vols back into the top 2 in the AP Poll. On November 1, 2022, Heupel led the Vols to their first #1 ranking since 1998, in the first release of the College Football Playoffs rankings. Shortly thereafter, they tumbled down the rankings after losing to #2 Georgia and a historic upset loss to then-unranked South Carolina, knocking them out of playoff contention. Heupel capped off the 11–2 season with a 31–14 win over the Clemson Tigers in the Orange Bowl. Tennessee's 11 wins were the most for the program since 2001 and tied for the second-most in school history. He won SEC Coach of the Year for the 2022 season.

On January 24, 2023, ESPN reported that Tennessee had reached a contract extension agreement that will keep Heupel in Knoxville until 2029, with an annual salary of $9 million.

==== 2023 season ====
In his third year at Tennessee, Heupel led the Vols to an 9–4 season, with a 4–4 record in the SEC. Tennessee defeated the Iowa Hawkeyes 35–0 in the Citrus Bowl to cap off the 2023 season. Tennessee finished ranked #21 in the CFP final rankings.

==== 2024 season ====
Heupel started off his fourth season at Tennessee with a 69–3 win over Chattanooga. In the Duke's Mayo Classic, Tennessee defeated NC State 51–10. In the Vols' third game, the team set a modern school record for points in a game with a 71–0 victory over Kent State. In a return to Oklahoma, Heupel helped lead the Vols to a 25–15 win over the Sooners to start 4–0. The Vols suffered their first setback in the fifth game against Arkansas with a 19–14 loss. The Vols rebounded with a 23–17 overtime victory over Florida in the following game. Tennessee defeated Alabama 24–17 in the following game. Tennessee defeated Kentucky 28–18 and Mississippi State 33–14 to set up a road game against Georgia with conference title game and playoff implications on the line. In the game, Tennessee fell to Georgia 31–17 on the road. Tennessee closed out the regular season with a 56–0 win over UTEP and a 36–23 win over Vanderbilt to finish 10–2, clinching the Vols' first appearance in the College Football Playoff, losing 17–42 to Ohio State in the first round.

==== 2025 season ====
The Vols started the season ranked 24th in the AP Poll. On November 22, he helped lead the team to a 31–11 road win over the Florida Gators for the Volunteers' first road win over their rivals since 2003. Heupel led the Vols to a 8–4 regular season record. The season ended with a 30–28 loss to Illinois in the Music City Bowl.

== Personal life ==
Heupel and his wife Dawn have a son and a daughter. Josh's sister Andrea is married to former U.S. Representative Dan Boren.

== Head coaching record ==
Year	Team	Overall	Conference	Standing	Bowl/playoffs	Coaches^{#}	AP^{°}
UCF Knights (American Athletic Conference) (2018–2020)
2018	UCF	12–1	8–0	1st (East)	L Fiesta^{†}	12	11
2019	UCF	10–3	6–2	2nd (East)	W Gasparilla	24	24
2020	UCF	6–4	5–3	T–3rd	L Boca Raton		
UCF:		28–8	19–5				
Tennessee Volunteers (Southeastern Conference) (2021–present)
2021	Tennessee	7–6	4–4	3rd (Eastern)	L Music City		
2022	Tennessee	11–2	6–2	2nd (Eastern)	W Orange^{†}	6	6
2023	Tennessee	9–4	4–4	3rd (Eastern)	W Citrus	17	17
2024	Tennessee	10–3	6–2	T–2nd	L CFP First Round^{†}	8	9
2025	Tennessee	8–5	4–4	T–8th	L Music City		
2026	Tennessee	9–2	6–2				
Tennessee:		54–22	30–18				
Total:		83–30					
National championship Conference title Conference division title or championship game berth
^{†}Indicates CFP / New Years' Six bowl.; ^{#}Rankings from final Coaches Poll.; ^{°}Rankings from final AP Poll.
