= Jacob Harris (American football) =

American football player (born 1997)

Profile
- Positions: Wide receiver, tight end

Personal information
- Born: April 16, 1997 (age 29); Palm Harbor, Florida, U.S.
- Listed height: 6 ft 5 in (1.96 m)
- Listed weight: 211 lb (96 kg)

Career information
- High school: Palm Harbor University
- College: Western Kentucky (2015); UCF (2017–2020)
- NFL draft: 2021: 4th round, 141st overall pick

Career history
- Los Angeles Rams (2021–2022); Jacksonville Jaguars (2023); Philadelphia Eagles (2024); San Antonio Brahmas (2025); Tampa Bay Buccaneers (2025)*
- * Offseason or practice squad member only

Awards and highlights
- Super Bowl champion (LVI); Colley Matrix national champion (2017)

Career NFL statistics as of 2024
- Receptions: 1
- Receiving yards: 6
- Stats at Pro Football Reference

Jacob Harris (born April 16, 1997) is an American professional football player. He played college football at UCF.

== Early life ==
Born in Palm Harbor, Florida, Harris attended and played high school football at Palm Harbor University. He did not play organized football until his senior year of high school. He was recruited by NCAA Division I programs to play college soccer.

== College career ==
Harris originally walked on at Western Kentucky, redshirting his freshman year. He then transferred back to his home state and joined the UCF Knights football team. He played "Flex" receiver all 13 games in both the 2018 and 2019 seasons, recording 448 yards and 1 touchdown on 19 receptions in 2019. In his 2020 senior campaign, Harris racked up 30 receptions gaining 539 yards and scoring 8 touchdowns (3rd most in the American Athletic Conference).

== Professional career ==
Pre-draft measurables
Height	Weight	Arm length	Hand span	Wingspan	40-yard dash	10-yard split	20-yard split	20-yard shuttle	Three-cone drill	Vertical jump	Broad jump	Bench press
6 ft 5 in (1.96 m)	219 lb (99 kg)	33 3/4 in (0.86 m)	9 1/2 in (0.24 m)	6 ft 9 1/4 in (2.06 m)	4.39 s	1.60 s	2.45 s	4.31 s	6.54 s	40.5 in (1.03 m)	11 ft 1 in (3.38 m)	15 reps
All values from Pro Day

=== Los Angeles Rams ===
Harris was selected by the Los Angeles Rams in the fourth round (141st pick) of the 2021 NFL draft. He signed his four-year rookie contract with the Rams on June 4, 2021.

On November 9, 2021, Harris was placed on injured reserve after suffering a season-ending ACL and MCL injury in Week 9. Without Harris, the Rams won Super Bowl LVI against the Cincinnati Bengals. On July 28, 2022, Harris converted from tight end to wide receiver.

On August 30, 2022, Harris was waived by the Rams and signed to the practice squad the next day. He was elevated to the active roster on September 17, 2022, and reverted back to the practice squad after the game. He was once again elevated to the active roster a week later, and reverted back to the practice squad after the game. He was promoted to the active roster on November 19, 2022. He was placed on injured reserve on December 12, 2022.

=== Jacksonville Jaguars ===
On May 15, 2023, Harris signed with the Jacksonville Jaguars. He was waived on August 29, 2023 and re-signed to the practice squad. His contract expired when the teams season ended January 7, 2024.

=== Philadelphia Eagles ===
On January 18, 2024, Harris signed a reserve/future contract with the Philadelphia Eagles. He was waived/injured on August 27. Harris was waived from injured reserve on October 15.

=== San Antonio Brahmas ===
On January 14, 2025, Harris signed with the San Antonio Brahmas of the United Football League (UFL).

=== Tampa Bay Buccaneers ===
On August 2, 2025, Harris signed with the Tampa Bay Buccaneers. He was waived on August 26 as part of final roster cuts.
