= Grand Valley State Lakers football, 1990–1999 =

American college football season

1990–1999 Grand Valley State Lakers football
- Conference: Midwest Intercollegiate Football Conference (1990–1998); Great Lakes Intercollegiate Athletic Conference (1999)
- Head coach: Tom Beck (1985–1990); Brian Kelly (1991–2003)
- Home stadium: Lubbers Stadium

The Grand Valley State Lakers football program, 1990–1999 represented Grand Valley State University (GVSU) during the 1990s in NCAA Division II college football as a member of the Midwest Intercollegiate Football Conference (MIFC) from 1990 to 1998 and the Great Lakes Intercollegiate Athletic Conference (GLIAC) starting in 1999. The team was led by head coaches Tom Beck (1985–1990) and Brian Kelly (1991–2003).

The team played its home games at Lubbers Stadium, named after former university president Arend Lubbers, located on GVSU's main campus in Allendale, Michigan.

== 1990 ==
1990 Grand Valley State Lakers football

MIFC champion

NCAA Division II first round, L 14–20 vs. East Texas State
- Conference: Midwest Intercollegiate Football Conference
- Record: 10–2 (9–1 MIFC)
- Head coach: Tom Beck (6th season)
- Defensive coordinator: Brian Kelly (2nd season)
- Home stadium: Lubbers Stadium

1990 Midwest Intercollegiate Football Conference standings
	Conf.					Overall
Team	W		L		T	W		L		T
No. 6 Grand Valley State $^	9	–	1	–	0	10	–	2	–	0
No. T–20 Ashland	7	–	3	–	0	7	–	3	–	1
Hillsdale	7	–	3	–	0	7	–	4	–	0
Ferris State	5	–	4	–	1	6	–	4	–	1
Butler	5	–	4	–	1	5	–	5	–	1
Northern Michigan	5	–	4	–	1	5	–	5	–	1
Saginaw Valley State	5	–	5	–	0	6	–	5	–	0
Indianapolis	3	–	6	–	1	3	–	6	–	1
Wayne State (MI)	3	–	7	–	0	3	–	7	–	0
Saint Joseph's (IN)	3	–	7	–	0	3	–	7	–	0
Valparaiso	1	–	9	–	0	1	–	9	–	0
$ – Conference champion; ^ – NCAA Division II playoff participant; Rankings from NCAA Division II Football Committee poll

The 1990 Grand Valley State Lakers football team represented Grand Valley State University (GVSU) as a member of the Midwest Intercollegiate Football Conference (MIFC) during the 1990 NCAA Division II football season. In their sixth and final year under head coach Tom Beck, the Lakers compiled a 10–2 record (9–1 in conference games), won the MIFC championship, and outscored opponents by a total of 412 to 162. They lost to East Texas State in the first round of the NCAA Division II playoffs.

Beck stepped down as GVSU's head coach in February 1991 to become an assistant coach at Notre Dame. Beck compiled a 50–18 record in six years as head coach.

=== Schedule ===
Date	Opponent	Rank	Site	Result	Attendance	Source
September 1	at Saint Joseph's (IN)	No. 9	Rensselaer, IN	W 58–16	1,000	
September 8	at Mankato State*	No. 9	Mankato, MN	W 27–24	1,200	
September 15	Butler	No. 6	Lubbers Stadium; Allendale, MI	W 35–0	3,909	
September 22	at Indianapolis	No. 3	Indianapolis, IN	W 30–12	2,244	
September 29	Saginaw Valley State	No. 3	Lubbers Stadium; Allendale, MI (Battle of the Valleys)	W 23–7	5,268–5,468	
October 6	at No. 14 Northern Michigan	No. 3	Marquette, MI	W 45–15	4,551	
October 13	Ferris State	No. 3	Lubbers Stadium; Allendale, MI (Anchor–Bone Classic)	W 42–12	5,866	
October 20	No. 9 Ashland	No. 3	Lubbers Stadium; Allendale, MI	W 14–3	4,051	
October 27	at Hillsdale	No. 3	Hillsdale, MI	L 34–38	5,000	
November 3	Wayne State (MI)	No. 8	Lubbers Stadium; Allendale, MI	W 35–15	3,953	
November 10	at Valparaiso	No. 6	Brown Field; Valparaiso, IN	W 55–0	1,238	
November 17	No. 7 East Texas State	No. 6	Lubbers Stadium; Allendale, MI (NCAA Division II first round)	L 14–20	3,103	
*Non-conference game; Rankings from NCAA Division II Football Committee Poll released prior to the game

== 1991 ==
1991 Grand Valley State Lakers football

NCAA Division II first round, L 15–36 vs. East Texas State
- Conference: Midwest Intercollegiate Football Conference
- Record: 9–3 (8–2 MIFC)
- Head coach: Brian Kelly (1st season)
- Home stadium: Lubbers Stadium

1991 Midwest Intercollegiate Football Conference standings
	Conf.					Overall
Team	W		L		T	W		L		T
No. 5 Butler $^	9	–	1	–	0	9	–	2	–	0
No. 15 Ashland	8	–	2	–	0	9	–	2	–	0
No. 9 Grand Valley State ^	8	–	2	–	0	9	–	3	–	0
Saginaw Valley State	5	–	5	–	0	6	–	5	–	0
Ferris State	5	–	5	–	0	5	–	6	–	0
Hillsdale	5	–	5	–	0	5	–	6	–	0
Wayne State (MI)	4	–	6	–	0	4	–	6	–	0
Saint Joseph's (IN)	4	–	6	–	0	4	–	6	–	0
Northern Michigan	3	–	6	–	1	3	–	6	–	1
Indianapolis	2	–	8	–	0	2	–	8	–	0
Valparaiso	1	–	8	–	1	1	–	8	–	1
$ – Conference champion; ^ – NCAA Division II playoff participant; Rankings from NCAA Division II Football Committee poll

The 1991 Grand Valley State Lakers football team represented Grand Valley State University (GVSU) as a member of the Midwest Intercollegiate Football Conference (MIFC) during the 1991 NCAA Division II football season. In their first year under head coach Brian Kelly, the Lakers compiled a 9–3 record (8–2 in conference games), tied for second place in the MIFC, and outscored opponents by a total of 313 to 166.

Kelly, at age 29, was announced as GVSU's new head coach in March 1991. He had been on the GVSU staff for five years and had been the defensive coordinator for the prior two seasons. He was GVSU's youngest head football coach and the first to have been promoted from within the GVSU staff.

=== Schedule ===
Date	Opponent	Rank	Site	Result	Attendance	Source
September 7	Saint Joseph's (IN)		Lubbers Stadium; Allendale, MI	W 31–3	4,611	
September 14	at No. 1 North Dakota State	No. 6	Dacotah Field; Fargo, ND	W 21–17	13,629	
September 21	at Butler		Indianapolis, IN	L 0–33		
September 28	Indianapolis		Lubbers Stadium; Allendale, MI	W 31–13		
October 5	at Saginaw Valley State		Wickes Stadium; University Center, MI (Battle of the Valleys)	L 10–14		
October 12	Northern Michigan		Lubbers Stadium; Allendale, MI	W 35–0		
October 19	at Ferris State		Top Taggart Field; Big Rapids, MI (Anchor–Bone Classic)	W 28–6	1,950	
October 26	at Ashland		Ashland, OH	W 38–7		
November 2	Hillsdale		Lubbers Stadium; Allendale, MI	W 9–6		
November 9	at Wayne State (MI)		Detroit, MI	W 59–28		
November 16	Valparaiso		Lubbers Stadium; Allendale, MI	W 36–3		
November 23	at No. 19 East Texas State	No. 9	Memorial Stadium; Commerce, TX (NCAA Division II first round)	L 15–36	3,000	
Rankings from NCAA Division II Football Committee Poll released prior to the game

== 1992 ==
1992 Grand Valley State Lakers football
- Conference: Midwest Intercollegiate Football Conference
- Record: 8–3 (8–2 MIFC)
- Head coach: Brian Kelly (2nd season)
- Home stadium: Lubbers Stadium

1992 Midwest Intercollegiate Football Conference standings
	Conf.					Overall
Team	W		L		T	W		L		T
Hillsdale +	8	–	2	–	0	9	–	2	–	0
Ferris State +^	8	–	2	–	0	10	–	3	–	0
Butler +	8	–	2	–	0	8	–	2	–	0
Grand Valley State +	8	–	2	–	0	8	–	3	–	0
Ashland	7	–	3	–	0	8	–	3	–	0
Saginaw Valley State	6	–	4	–	0	7	–	4	–	0
Wayne State (MI)	3	–	7	–	0	4	–	7	–	0
Valparaiso	3	–	7	–	0	3	–	8	–	0
Indianapolis	1	–	8	–	1	1	–	8	–	1
Saint Joseph's (IN)	1	–	8	–	1	1	–	8	–	1
Northern Michigan	1	–	9	–	0	1	–	9	–	0
+ – Conference co-champions; ^ – NCAA Division II playoff participant

The 1992 Grand Valley State Lakers football team represented Grand Valley State University (GVSU) as a member of the Midwest Intercollegiate Football Conference (MIFC) during the 1992 NCAA Division II football season. In their second year under head coach Brian Kelly, the Lakers compiled an 8–3 record (8–2 in conference games), finished in a three-way tie for second place in the MIFC, and outscored opponents by a total of 249 to 219.

=== Schedule ===
Date	Opponent	Site	Result	Attendance	Source
September 5	at Saint Joseph's (IN)	Rensselaer, IN	W 28–18		
September 12	Indiana (PA)*	Lubbers Stadium; Allendale, MI	L 27–45		
September 19	Butler	Lubbers Stadium; Allendale, MI	W 21–10		
September 26	at Indianapolis	Indianapolis, IN	W 21–7		
October 3	Saginaw Valley State	Lubbers Stadium; Allendale, MI (Battle of the Valleys)	W 24–20		
October 10	at Northern Michigan	Marquette, MI	W 23–20		
October 17	Ferris State	Lubbers Stadium; Allendale, MI (Anchor–Bone Classic)	L 0–23		
October 24	Ashland	Lubbers Stadium; Allendale, MI	L 10–27		
October 31	at Hillsdale	Hillsdale, MI	W 34–21		
November 7	Wayne State (MI)	Lubbers Stadium; Allendale, MI	W 16–14		
November 14	at Valparaiso	Valparaiso, IN	W 45–14		
*Non-conference game

== 1993 ==
1993 Grand Valley State Lakers football
- Conference: Midwest Intercollegiate Football Conference
- Record: 6–3–2 (6–2–2 MIFC)
- Head coach: Brian Kelly (3rd season)
- Home stadium: Lubbers Stadium

1993 Midwest Intercollegiate Football Conference standings
	Conf.					Overall
Team	W		L		T	W		L		T
No. 10 Ferris State $^	8	–	0	–	2	9	–	1	–	2
No. 15 Ashland	8	–	2	–	0	9	–	2	–	0
Grand Valley State	6	–	2	–	2	6	–	3	–	2
Hillsdale	6	–	3	–	1	7	–	3	–	1
Northern Michigan	5	–	4	–	1	5	–	4	–	1
Wayne State (MI)	5	–	5	–	0	6	–	5	–	0
St. Francis (IL)	5	–	5	–	0	5	–	6	–	0
Saginaw Valley State	4	–	6	–	0	4	–	7	–	0
Northwood	2	–	7	–	1	3	–	7	–	1
Saint Joseph's (IN)	1	–	8	–	1	1	–	8	–	1
Indianapolis	1	–	9	–	0	2	–	9	–	0
$ – Conference champion; ^ – NCAA Division II playoff participant; Rankings from NCAA Division II Football Committee poll

The 1993 Grand Valley State Lakers football team represented Grand Valley State University (GVSU) as a member of the Midwest Intercollegiate Football Conference (MIFC) during the 1993 NCAA Division II football season. In their third year under head coach Brian Kelly, the Lakers compiled a 6–3–2 record (6–2–2 in conference games), finished in third place in the MIFC, and outscored opponents by a total of 271 to 227.

=== Schedule ===
Date	Opponent	Site	Result	Attendance	Source
September 4	Saint Joseph's (IN)	Lubbers Stadium; Allendale, MI	W 38–14		
September 11	at Indiana (PA)*	Indiana, PA	L 3–34		
September 18	at Northwood	Midland, MI	W 35–0		
September 25	Indianapolis	Lubbers Stadium; Allendale, MI	W 31–7		
October 2	at Saginaw Valley State	Wickes Stadium; University Center, MI (Battle of the Valleys)	W 36–17		
October 9	Northern Michigan	Lubbers Stadium; Allendale, MI	T 28–28		
October 16	at Ferris State	Top Taggart Field; Big Rapids, MI (Anchor–Bone Classic)	T 17–17		
October 23	at Ashland	Ashland, OH	L 14–29		
October 30	Hillsdale	Lubbers Stadium; Allendale, MI	L 21–38		
November 6	at Wayne State (MI)	Tom Adams Field; Detroit, MI	W 28–25		
November 13	St. Francis (IL)	Lubbers Stadium; Allendale, MI	W 20–18		
*Non-conference game

== 1994 ==
1994 Grand Valley State Lakers football
- Conference: Midwest Intercollegiate Football Conference
- Record: 8–4 (8–2 MIFC)
- Head coach: Brian Kelly (4th season)
- Home stadium: Lubbers Stadium

1994 Midwest Intercollegiate Football Conference standings
	Conf.					Overall
Team	W		L		T	W		L		T
No. 5 Ferris State $^	10	–	0	–	0	11	–	1	–	0
No. 18 Grand Valley State ^	8	–	2	–	0	8	–	4	–	0
Hillsdale	7	–	3	–	0	7	–	4	–	0
Ashland	6	–	4	–	0	6	–	4	–	0
Saginaw Valley State	6	–	4	–	0	6	–	4	–	0
Wayne State (MI)	6	–	4	–	0	6	–	5	–	0
Northern Michigan	5	–	5	–	0	5	–	5	–	0
Michigan Tech	3	–	7	–	0	4	–	7	–	0
Saint Joseph's (IN)	3	–	7	–	0	4	–	7	–	0
Indianapolis	2	–	7	–	1	2	–	7	–	1
Northwood	2	–	7	–	1	2	–	7	–	1
St. Francis (IL)	1	–	9	–	0	1	–	10	–	0
$ – Conference champion; ^ – NCAA Division II playoff participant; Rankings from NCAA Division II Football Committee poll

The 1994 Grand Valley State Lakers football team represented Grand Valley State University (GVSU) as a member of the Midwest Intercollegiate Football Conference (MIFC) during the 1994 NCAA Division II football season. In their fourth year under head coach Brian Kelly, the Lakers compiled an 8–4 record (8–2 in conference games), finished in second place in the MIFC, and outscored opponents by a total of 387 to 239.

=== Schedule ===
Date	Opponent	Site	Result	Attendance	Source
September 3	at Indiana (PA)*	Indiana, PA	L 33–35		
September 10	at Indianapolis	Indianapolis, IN	W 35–24		
September 17	St. Francis (IL)	Lubbers Stadium; Allendale, MI	W 49–7		
September 24	at Ashland	Ashland, OH	W 17–7		
October 1	Ferris State	Lubbers Stadium; Allendale, MI (Anchor–Bone Classic)	L 21–27		
October 8	Wayne State (MI)	Lubbers Stadium; Allendale, MI	W 31–14		
October 15	at Hillsdale	Hillsdale, MI	L 20–33		
October 22	Michigan Tech	Lubbers Stadium; Allendale, MI	W 33–7		
October 29	at Northern Michigan	Superior Dome; Marquette, MI	W 24–17		
November 5	Saginaw Valley State	Lubbers Stadium; Allendale, MI (Battle of the Valleys)	W 27–20		
November 12	at Northwood	Midland, MI	W 70–13		
November 19	at Indiana (PA)*	Indiana, PA (NCAA Division II first round)	L 27–35		
*Non-conference game

== 1995 ==
1995 Grand Valley State Lakers football
- Conference: Midwest Intercollegiate Football Conference
- Record: 8–3 (8–2 MIFC)
- Head coach: Brian Kelly (5th season)
- Home stadium: Lubbers Stadium

1995 Midwest Intercollegiate Football Conference standings
	Conf.					Overall
Team	W		L		T	W		L		T
No. 3 Ferris State $^	10	–	0	–	0	12	–	1	–	0
Grand Valley State	8	–	2	–	0	8	–	3	–	0
Northern Michigan	7	–	3	–	0	7	–	3	–	0
Saginaw Valley State	7	–	3	–	0	7	–	3	–	0
Hillsdale	7	–	3	–	0	7	–	4	–	0
Michigan Tech	5	–	5	–	0	5	–	5	–	0
St. Francis (IL)	5	–	5	–	0	5	–	6	–	0
Indianapolis	3	–	7	–	0	3	–	8	–	0
Wayne State (MI)	3	–	7	–	0	3	–	8	–	0
Ashland	2	–	8	–	0	2	–	8	–	0
Northwood	2	–	8	–	0	2	–	8	–	0
Saint Joseph's (IN)	1	–	9	–	0	1	–	9	–	0
$ – Conference champion; ^ – NCAA Division II playoff participant; Rankings from NCAA Division II Football Committee poll

The 1995 Grand Valley State Lakers football team represented Grand Valley State University (GVSU) as a member of the Midwest Intercollegiate Football Conference (MIFC) during the 1995 NCAA Division II football season. In their fifth year under head coach Brian Kelly, the Lakers compiled an 8–3 record (8–2 in conference games), finished in second place in the MIFC, and outscored opponents by a total of 407 to 211.

=== Schedule ===
Date	Opponent	Rank	Site	Result	Attendance	Source
September 2	Indiana (PA)*		Lubbers Stadium; Allendale, MI	L 25–28		
September 9	Indianapolis		Lubbers Stadium; Allendale, MI	W 56–0		
September 16	at St. Francis (IL)		Joliet, IL	W 42–0		
September 23	Ashland		Lubbers Stadium; Allendale, MI	W 52–17		
September 30	at No. 5 Ferris State	No. 12	Top Taggart Field; Big Rapids, MI (Anchor–Bone Classic)	L 21–30		
October 7	at Wayne State (MI)		Tom Adams Field; Detroit, MI	W 42–10		
October 14	Hillsdale		Lubbers Stadium; Allendale, MI	W 25–20		
October 21	at Michigan Tech		Sherman Field; Houghton, MI	W 54–52		
October 28	Northern Michigan		Lubbers Stadium; Allendale, MI	W 26–23		
November 4	at Saginaw Valley State		Wickes Stadium; University Center, MI (Battle of the Valleys)	L 21–24		
November 11	Northwood		Lubbers Stadium; Allendale, MI	W 43–7		
*Non-conference game; Rankings from NCAA Division II Football Committee Poll released prior to the game

== 1996 ==
1996 Grand Valley State Lakers football
- Conference: Midwest Intercollegiate Football Conference
- Record: 8–3 (8–2 MIFC)
- Head coach: Brian Kelly (6th season)
- Home stadium: Lubbers Stadium

1996 Midwest Intercollegiate Football Conference standings
	Conf.			Overall
Team	W		L	W		L
No. 3 Ferris State $^	9	–	1	10	–	2
Grand Valley State	8	–	2	8	–	3
Northern Michigan	7	–	3	7	–	3
No. 20 Saginaw Valley State	7	–	3	7	–	3
Hillsdale	6	–	4	6	–	5
Northwood	5	–	5	6	–	5
Ashland	4	–	6	4	–	7
Indianapolis	3	–	7	4	–	7
St. Francis (IL)	2	–	8	3	–	8
Michigan Tech	2	–	8	2	–	8
Wayne State (MI)	2	–	8	2	–	9
$ – Conference champion; ^ – NCAA Division II playoff participant; Rankings from NCAA Division II Football Committee poll

The 1996 Grand Valley State Lakers football team represented Grand Valley State University (GVSU) as a member of the Midwest Intercollegiate Football Conference (MIFC) during the 1996 NCAA Division II football season. In their sixth year under head coach Brian Kelly, the Lakers compiled an 8–3 record (8–2 in conference games), finished in second place in the MIFC, and outscored opponents by a total of 272 to 165.

=== Schedule ===
Date	Opponent	Site	Result	Attendance	Source
August 31	at Southwest Texas State*	Bobcat Stadium; San Marcos, TX	L 14–19		
September 7	St. Francis (IL)	Lubbers Stadium; Allendale, MI	L 20–31		
September 14	at Ashland	Ashland, OH	W 14–7		
September 21	Ferris State	Lubbers Stadium; Allendale, MI (Anchor–Bone Classic)	W 36–17		
September 28	Wayne State (MI)	Lubbers Stadium; Allendale, MI	W 23–0		
October 5	at Hillsdale	Hillsdale, MI	W 17–16		
October 12	Michigan Tech	Lubbers Stadium; Allendale, MI	W 56–7		
October 19	at Northern Michigan	Marquette, MI	L 9–14		
October 26	Saginaw Valley State	Lubbers Stadium; Allendale, MI (Battle of the Valleys)	W 17–6		
November 2	at Northwood	Midland, MI	W 38–34		
November 16	at Indianapolis	Indianapolis, IN	W 28–14		
*Non-conference game

== 1997 ==
1997 Grand Valley State Lakers football

MIFC co-champion
- Conference: Midwest Intercollegiate Football Conference
- Record: 9–2 (9–1 MIFC)
- Head coach: Brian Kelly (7th season)
- Home stadium: Lubbers Stadium

1997 Midwest Intercollegiate Football Conference standings
	Conf.			Overall
Team	W		L	W		L
No. 12 Ashland +^	9	–	1	9	–	2
Grand Valley State +	9	–	1	9	–	1
Saginaw Valley State	8	–	2	9	–	2
Indianapolis	7	–	3	8	–	3
Northern Michigan	6	–	4	7	–	4
Hillsdale	4	–	6	4	–	7
Ferris State	3	–	7	3	–	7
Northwood	3	–	7	3	–	7
Wayne State (MI)	3	–	7	3	–	8
Michigan Tech	2	–	8	2	–	8
St. Francis (IL)	1	–	9	1	–	9
+ – Conference co-champions; ^ – NCAA Division II playoff participant; Rankings from NCAA Division II Football Committee poll

The 1997 Grand Valley State Lakers football team represented Grand Valley State University (GVSU) as a member of the Midwest Intercollegiate Football Conference (MIFC) during the 1997 NCAA Division II football season. In their seventh year under head coach Brian Kelly, the Lakers compiled a 9–2 record (9–1 in conference games), tied with Ashland for the MIFC championship, and outscored opponents by a total of 330 to 237.

=== Schedule ===
Date	Opponent	Site	Result	Attendance	Source
September 6	at St. Francis (IL)	Joliet Memorial Stadium; Joliet, IL	W 37–29	1,000	
September 13	Ashland	Lubbers Stadium; Allendale, MI	W 31–20	3,900	
September 20	at Ferris State	Top Taggart Field; Big Rapids, MI (Anchor–Bone Classic)	W 21–18	6,619	
September 27	at Wayne State (MI)	Tom Adams Field; Detroit, MI	W 45–30	2,496	
October 4	Hillsdale	Lubbers Stadium; Allendale, MI	W 14–12		
October 11	at Michigan Tech	Sherman Field; Houghton, MI	W 49–21		
October 18	Northern Michigan	Lubbers Stadium; Allendale, MI	W 39–22		
October 25	at Saginaw Valley State	Wickes Stadium; University Center, MI (Battle of the Valleys)	L 27–30	4,200	
November 1	Northwood	Lubbers Stadium; Allendale, MI	W 24–20	2,193	
November 8	at UC Davis*	Toomey Field; Davis, CA	L 19–21	7,751	
November 15	Indianapolis	Lubbers Stadium; Allendale, MI	W 23–14	2,700	
*Non-conference game

== 1998 ==
1998 Grand Valley State Lakers football

MIFC champion
- Conference: Midwest Intercollegiate Football Conference
- Record: 9–3 (9–1 MIFC)
- Head coach: Brian Kelly (8th season)
- Home stadium: Lubbers Stadium

1998 Midwest Intercollegiate Football Conference standings
	Conf.			Overall
Team	W		L	W		L
No. 14 Grand Valley State $^	9	–	1	9	–	3
Saginaw Valley State	8	–	2	9	–	2
Indianapolis	8	–	2	8	–	2
Ashland	7	–	3	7	–	3
Northwood	7	–	3	7	–	3
Findlay	5	–	5	5	–	5
Mercyhurst	5	–	5	5	–	5
Ferris State	5	–	5	5	–	6
Northern Michigan	4	–	5	5	–	5
Michigan Tech	4	–	6	4	–	6
Hillsdale	3	–	7	3	–	8
Westminster (PA)	2	–	7	3	–	7
Wayne State (MI)	2	–	8	2	–	9
St. Francis (IL)	0	–	10	0	–	11
$ – Conference champion; ^ – NCAA Division II playoff participant; Rankings from NCAA Division II Football Committee poll

The 1998 Grand Valley State Lakers football team represented Grand Valley State University (GVSU) as a member of the Midwest Intercollegiate Football Conference (MIFC) during the 1998 NCAA Division II football season. In their eighth year under head coach Brian Kelly, the Lakers compiled a 9–3 record (9–1 in conference games), won the MIFC championship, and outscored opponents by a total of 462 to 322.

=== Schedule ===
Date	Opponent	Site	Result	Attendance	Source
September 3	vs. Ashland	Grand Rapids, MI	W 42–35		
September 12	Northwood	Lubbers Stadium; Allendale, MI	W 44–41	4,520	
September 19	at Indianapolis	Indianapolis, IN	W 28–17		
September 26	Findlay	Lubbers Stadium; Allendale, MI	W 50–7		
October 3	St. Francis (IL)	Lubbers Stadium; Allendale, MI	W 40–2		
October 10	at Mercyhurst	Tullio Field; Erie, PA	W 49–14		
October 17	at Saginaw Valley State	Wickes Stadium; University Center, MI (Battle of the Valleys)	W 37–36		
October 24	Northern Michigan	Lubbers Stadium; Allendale, MI	L 14–17		
October 31	UC Davis	Lubbers Stadium; Allendale, MI	L 38–40		
November 7	at Michigan Tech	Sherman Field; Houghton, MI	W 43–23		
November 14	at Ferris State	Top Taggart Field; Big Rapids, MI (Anchor–Bone Classic)	W 56–53		
November 21	at Slippery Rock	Slippery Rock, PA	L 14–37		

== 1999 ==
1999 Grand Valley State Lakers football
- Conference: Great Lakes Intercollegiate Athletic Conference
- Record: 5–5 (5–4 GLIAC)
- Head coach: Brian Kelly (9th season)
- Home stadium: Lubbers Stadium

1999 Great Lakes Intercollegiate Athletic Conference football standings
	Conf.			Overall
Team	W		L	W		L
No. 10 Northwood +	7	–	2	8	–	2
Ferris State +	7	–	2	7	–	3
Ashland	7	–	3	7	–	3
Hillsdale	6	–	3	8	–	3
Northern Michigan	6	–	3	6	–	4
Michigan Tech	6	–	4	6	–	4
Indianapolis	5	–	4	7	–	4
Grand Valley State	5	–	4	5	–	5
Mercyhurst	4	–	5	5	–	5
Saginaw Valley State	4	–	5	4	–	6
Westminster (PA)	2	–	8	3	–	8
Findlay	2	–	8	2	–	8
Wayne State (MI)	0	–	10	0	–	11
+ – Conference co-champions; Rankings from NCAA Division II Football Committee poll

The 1999 Grand Valley State Lakers football team represented Grand Valley State University (GVSU) as a member of the Great Lakes Intercollegiate Athletic Conference (GLIAC) during the 1999 NCAA Division II football season. In their ninth year under head coach Brian Kelly, the Lakers compiled a 5–5 record (5–4 in conference games), tied for seventh place in the MIFC, and were outscored by a total of 273 to 259.

=== Schedule ===
Date	Opponent	Site	Result	Attendance	Source
September 2	vs. South Dakota State*	Houseman Field; Grand Rapids, MI	L 20–35	5,673	
September 11	at Northwood	Midland Stadium; Midland, MI	L 30–41	5,211	
September 18	Indianapolis	Lubbers Stadium; Allendale, MI	L 14–30	8,028	
September 25	at Findlay	Donnell Stadium; Findlay, OH	W 37–9	2,500	
October 9	Mercyhurst	Lubbers Stadium; Allendale, MI	W 26–19	3,140	
October 16	Saginaw Valley State	Lubbers Stadium; Allendale, MI (Battle of the Valleys)	W 31–7	4,323	
October 23	at Northern Michigan	Superior Dome; Marquette, MI	L 13–51	3,890	
October 30	at Ashland	Community Stadium; Ashland, OH	W 44–26	4,850	
November 6	Michigan Tech	Lubbers Stadium; Allendale, MI	W 21–7	2,775	
November 13	Ferris State	Lubbers Stadium; Allendale, MI (Anchor–Bone Classic)	L 23–48	5,277	
*Non-conference game
