= Saginaw Valley State Cardinals football, 1990–1999 =

American college football season

1990–1999 Saginaw Valley State Cardinals football
- Conference: Midwest Intercollegiate Football Conference; Great Lakes Intercollegiate Athletic Conference
- Head coach: George Ihler (1983–1993); Jerry Kill (1994–1998); Randy Awrey (1999–2007)
- Home stadium: Harvey Randall Wickes Memorial Stadium

The Saginaw Valley State Cardinals football program, 1990–1999 represented Saginaw Valley State University (SVSU) during the 1990s in NCAA Division II college football. SVSU was a member of the Midwest Intercollegiate Football Conference (MIFC) from 1990 to 1998 and the Great Lakes Intercollegiate Athletic Conference (GLIAC) starting in 1999. The team was led during the decade by three head coaches: George Ihler (1983–1993); Jerry Kill (1994–1998); and Randy Awrey (1999–2007).

The team played its home games at Harvey Randall Wickes Memorial Stadium, commonly shortened to Wickes Stadium, in University Center, Michigan.

== Decade overview ==
Year	Head coach	Overall record	Conf. record	Conf. rank	Points scored	Points against	Delta
1990	George Ihler	6–5	5–5	7	247	203	+44
1991	George Ihler	6–5	5–5	4 (tie)	191	170	+71
1992	George Ihler	7–4	6–4	6	221	148	+73
1993	George Ihler	4–7	4–6	8	179	276	-97
1994	Jerry Kill	6–4	6–4	4 (tie)	294	220	+74
1995	Jerry Kill	7–3	7–3	3 (tie)	359	234	+125
1996	Jerry Kill	7–3	7–3	3 (tie)	269	157	+112
1997	Jerry Kill	9–2	8–2	3	457	209	+248
1998	Jerry Kill	9–2	8–2	2	467	222	+245
1999	Randy Awrey	4–6	4–5	9 (tie)	272	362	-90
TOTAL		65–43	–				

== 1990 ==
1990 Saginaw Valley State Cardinals football
- Conference: Midwest Intercollegiate Football Conference
- Record: 6–5 (5–5 MIFC)
- Head coach: George Ihler (8th season)
- Home stadium: Harvey Randall Wickes Memorial Stadium

1990 Midwest Intercollegiate Football Conference standings
	Conf.					Overall
Team	W		L		T	W		L		T
No. 6 Grand Valley State $^	9	–	1	–	0	10	–	2	–	0
No. T–20 Ashland	7	–	3	–	0	7	–	3	–	1
Hillsdale	7	–	3	–	0	7	–	4	–	0
Ferris State	5	–	4	–	1	6	–	4	–	1
Butler	5	–	4	–	1	5	–	5	–	1
Northern Michigan	5	–	4	–	1	5	–	5	–	1
Saginaw Valley State	5	–	5	–	0	6	–	5	–	0
Indianapolis	3	–	6	–	1	3	–	6	–	1
Wayne State (MI)	3	–	7	–	0	3	–	7	–	0
Saint Joseph's (IN)	3	–	7	–	0	3	–	7	–	0
Valparaiso	1	–	9	–	0	1	–	9	–	0
$ – Conference champion; ^ – NCAA Division II playoff participant; Rankings from NCAA Division II Football Committee poll

The 1990 Saginaw Valley State Cardinals football team represented Saginaw Valley State University (SVSU) as a member of the Midwest Intercollegiate Football Conference (MIFC) during the 1990 NCAA Division II football season. In their eighth year under head coach George Ihler, the Cardinals compiled a 6–5 record (5–5 in conference games), finished in seventh place in the MIFC, and outscored opponents by a total of 247 to 203.

=== Schedule ===
Date	Opponent	Site	Result	Attendance	Source
September 1	Hillsdale	Wickes Stadium; University Center, MI	L 7–30		
September 8	at Wayne State (MI)	Detroit, MI	W 30–6		
September 15	at Northern Michigan	Marquette, MI	L 14–24		
September 22	Saint Joseph's (IN)	Wickes Stadium; University Center, MI	W 35–24		
September 29	at No. 3 Grand Valley State	Lubbers Stadium; Allendale, MI (Battle of the Valleys)	L 7–23	5,268–5,468	
October 6	No. 13 Ashland	Wickes Stadium; University Center, MI	L 21–40		
October 13	at Indianapolis	Indianapolis, IN	W 16–13		
October 20	Northwood*	Wickes Stadium; University Center, MI (Axe Bowl)	W 33–8		
October 27	Valparaiso	Wickes Stadium; University Center, MI	W 46–14		
November 3	at Ferris State	Top Taggart Field; Big Rapids, MI	W 21–14		
November 10	Butler	Wickes Stadium; University Center, MI	W 17–7		
*Non-conference game; Rankings from NCAA Division II Football Committee Poll released prior to the game

== 1991 ==
1991 Saginaw Valley State Cardinals football
- Conference: Midwest Intercollegiate Football Conference
- Record: 6–5 (5–5 MIFC)
- Head coach: George Ihler (9th season)
- Home stadium: Harvey Randall Wickes Memorial Stadium

1991 Midwest Intercollegiate Football Conference standings
	Conf.					Overall
Team	W		L		T	W		L		T
No. 5 Butler $^	9	–	1	–	0	9	–	2	–	0
No. 15 Ashland	8	–	2	–	0	9	–	2	–	0
No. 9 Grand Valley State ^	8	–	2	–	0	9	–	3	–	0
Saginaw Valley State	5	–	5	–	0	6	–	5	–	0
Ferris State	5	–	5	–	0	5	–	6	–	0
Hillsdale	5	–	5	–	0	5	–	6	–	0
Wayne State (MI)	4	–	6	–	0	4	–	6	–	0
Saint Joseph's (IN)	4	–	6	–	0	4	–	6	–	0
Northern Michigan	3	–	6	–	1	3	–	6	–	1
Indianapolis	2	–	8	–	0	2	–	8	–	0
Valparaiso	1	–	8	–	1	1	–	8	–	1
$ – Conference champion; ^ – NCAA Division II playoff participant; Rankings from NCAA Division II Football Committee poll

The 1991 Saginaw Valley State Cardinals football team represented Saginaw Valley State University (SVSU) as a member of the Midwest Intercollegiate Football Conference (MIFC) during the 1991 NCAA Division II football season. In their ninth year under head coach George Ihler, the Cardinals compiled a 6–5 record (5–5 in conference games), finished in a three-way tie for fourth place in the MIFC, and outscored opponents by a total of 191 to 170.

=== Schedule ===
Date	Opponent	Site	Result	Attendance	Source
September 7	at Hillsdale	Hillsdale, MI	L 0–14		
September 14	Wayne State (MI)	Wickes Stadium; University Center, MI	L 9–21		
September 21	Northern Michigan	Wickes Stadium; University Center, MI	W 14–7		
September 28	at Saint Joseph's (IN)	Rensselaer, IN	W 38–33		
October 5	Grand Valley State	Wickes Stadium; University Center, MI (Battle of the Valleys)	W 14–10		
October 12	at Ashland	Ashland, OH	L 6–26		
October 19	Indianapolis	Wickes Stadium; University Center, MI	W 21–7		
October 26	at Northwood	Midland, MI (Axe Bowl)	W 10–7		
November 2	at Valparaiso	Valparaiso, IN	W 54–14		
November 9	Ferris State	Wickes Stadium; University Center, MI	L 15–18		
November 16	at Butler	Indianapolis, IN	L 10–13		

== 1992 ==
1992 Saginaw Valley State Cardinals football
- Conference: Midwest Intercollegiate Football Conference
- Record: 7–4 (6–4 MIFC)
- Head coach: George Ihler (10th season)
- Home stadium: Harvey Randall Wickes Memorial Stadium

1992 Midwest Intercollegiate Football Conference standings
	Conf.					Overall
Team	W		L		T	W		L		T
Hillsdale +	8	–	2	–	0	9	–	2	–	0
Ferris State +^	8	–	2	–	0	10	–	3	–	0
Butler +	8	–	2	–	0	8	–	2	–	0
Grand Valley State +	8	–	2	–	0	8	–	3	–	0
Ashland	7	–	3	–	0	8	–	3	–	0
Saginaw Valley State	6	–	4	–	0	7	–	4	–	0
Wayne State (MI)	3	–	7	–	0	4	–	7	–	0
Valparaiso	3	–	7	–	0	3	–	8	–	0
Indianapolis	1	–	8	–	1	1	–	8	–	1
Saint Joseph's (IN)	1	–	8	–	1	1	–	8	–	1
Northern Michigan	1	–	9	–	0	1	–	9	–	0
+ – Conference co-champions; ^ – NCAA Division II playoff participant

The 1992 Saginaw Valley State Cardinals football team represented Saginaw Valley State University (SVSU) as a member of the Midwest Intercollegiate Football Conference (MIFC) during the 1992 NCAA Division II football season. In their tenth year under head coach George Ihler, the Cardinals compiled a 7–4 record (6–4 in conference games), finished in sixth place in the MIFC, and outscored opponents by a total of 221 to 148.

=== Schedule ===
Date	Opponent	Site	Result	Attendance	Source
September 5	Hillsdale	Wickes Stadium; University Center, MI	L 0–21		
September 12	at Wayne State (MI)	Tom Adams Field; Detroit, MI	W 32–13		
September 19	at Northern Michigan	Superior Dome; Marquette, MI	W 17–3		
September 26	Saint Joseph's (IN)	Wickes Stadium; University Center, MI	W 20–18		
October 3	at Grand Valley State	Lubbers Stadium; Allendale, MI (Battle of the Valleys)	L 20–24		
October 10	Ashland	Wickes Stadium; University Center, MI	W 16–7		
October 17	at Indianapolis	Indianapolis, IN	W 42–0		
October 24	Northwood*	Wickes Stadium; University Center, MI (Axe Bowl)	W 31–12		
October 31	Valparaiso	Wickes Stadium; University Center, MI	W 34–3		
November 7	at Ferris State	Top Taggart Field; Big Rapids, MI	L 9–10		
November 14	Butler	Wickes Stadium; University Center, MI	L 0–37		
*Non-conference game

== 1993 ==
1993 Saginaw Valley State Cardinals football
- Conference: Midwest Intercollegiate Football Conference
- Record: 4–7 (4–6 MIFC)
- Head coach: George Ihler (11th season)
- Home stadium: Harvey Randall Wickes Memorial Stadium

1993 Midwest Intercollegiate Football Conference standings
	Conf.					Overall
Team	W		L		T	W		L		T
No. 10 Ferris State $^	8	–	0	–	2	9	–	1	–	2
No. 15 Ashland	8	–	2	–	0	9	–	2	–	0
Grand Valley State	6	–	2	–	2	6	–	3	–	2
Hillsdale	6	–	3	–	1	7	–	3	–	1
Northern Michigan	5	–	4	–	1	5	–	4	–	1
Wayne State (MI)	5	–	5	–	0	6	–	5	–	0
St. Francis (IL)	5	–	5	–	0	5	–	6	–	0
Saginaw Valley State	4	–	6	–	0	4	–	7	–	0
Northwood	2	–	7	–	1	3	–	7	–	1
Saint Joseph's (IN)	1	–	8	–	1	1	–	8	–	1
Indianapolis	1	–	9	–	0	2	–	9	–	0
$ – Conference champion; ^ – NCAA Division II playoff participant; Rankings from NCAA Division II Football Committee poll

The 1993 Saginaw Valley State Cardinals football team represented Saginaw Valley State University (SVSU) as a member of the Midwest Intercollegiate Football Conference (MIFC) during the 1993 NCAA Division II football season. In their 11th and final year under head coach George Ihler, the Cardinals compiled a 4–7 record (4–6 in conference games), finished in eighth place in the MIFC, and were outscored by a total of 276 to 179.

=== Schedule ===
Date	Opponent	Site	Result	Attendance	Source
September 4	at Hillsdale	Hillsdale, MI	L 7–42		
September 11	Wayne State (MI)	Wickes Stadium; University Center, MI	W 32–31		
September 18	Northern Michigan	Wickes Stadium; University Center, MI	L 14–28		
September 25	at Saint Joseph's (IN)	Rensselaer, IN	W 13–3		
October 2	Grand Valley State	Wickes Stadium; University Center, MI (Battle of the Valleys)	L 17–36		
October 9	at Ashland	Ashland, OH	L 6–20		
October 16	Indianapolis	Wickes Stadium; University Center, MI	W 14–0		
October 23	Michigan Tech*	Wickes Stadium; University Center, MI	L 7–21		
October 30	at St. Francis (IL)	Joliet, IL	L 33–54		
November 6	Ferris State	Wickes Stadium; University Center, MI	L 23–34		
November 13	at Northwood	Midland, MI (Axe Bowl)	W 13–7		
*Non-conference game

== 1994 ==
1994 Saginaw Valley State Cardinals football
- Conference: Midwest Intercollegiate Football Conference
- Record: 6–4 (6–4 MIFC)
- Head coach: Jerry Kill (1st season)
- Home stadium: Harvey Randall Wickes Memorial Stadium

1994 Midwest Intercollegiate Football Conference standings
	Conf.					Overall
Team	W		L		T	W		L		T
No. 5 Ferris State $^	10	–	0	–	0	11	–	1	–	0
No. 18 Grand Valley State ^	8	–	2	–	0	8	–	4	–	0
Hillsdale	7	–	3	–	0	7	–	4	–	0
Ashland	6	–	4	–	0	6	–	4	–	0
Saginaw Valley State	6	–	4	–	0	6	–	4	–	0
Wayne State (MI)	6	–	4	–	0	6	–	5	–	0
Northern Michigan	5	–	5	–	0	5	–	5	–	0
Michigan Tech	3	–	7	–	0	4	–	7	–	0
Saint Joseph's (IN)	3	–	7	–	0	4	–	7	–	0
Indianapolis	2	–	7	–	1	2	–	7	–	1
Northwood	2	–	7	–	1	2	–	7	–	1
St. Francis (IL)	1	–	9	–	0	1	–	10	–	0
$ – Conference champion; ^ – NCAA Division II playoff participant; Rankings from NCAA Division II Football Committee poll

The 1994 Saginaw Valley State Cardinals football team represented Saginaw Valley State University (SVSU) as a member of the Midwest Intercollegiate Football Conference (MIFC) during the 1995 NCAA Division II football season. In their first year under head coach Jerry Kill, the Cardinals compiled a 6–4 record (6–4 in conference games), finished in a three-way tie for fourth place in the MIFC, and outscored opponents by a total of 294 to 220.

Kill was announced as SVSU's football team in May 1994. Kill had been a coach for the past 11 years, most recently as offensive coordinator at Pittsburg State in Kansas. He had never coached a team that had lost more than three games in a season.

=== Schedule ===
Date	Opponent	Site	Result	Attendance	Source
September 10	Northern Michigan	Wickes Stadium; University Center, MI	L 14–24		
September 17	at Wayne State (MI)	Detroit, MI	W 22–21		
September 24	Northwood	Wickes Stadium; University Center, MI (Axe Bowl)	W 48–14		
October 1	at Michigan Tech	Houghton, MI	L 36–38		
October 8	at Saint Joseph's (IN)	Rensselaer, IN	W 13–12		
October 15	Ashland	Wickes Stadium; University Center, MI	W 41–13		
October 22	at Indianapolis	Indianapolis, IN	W 42–21		
October 29	St. Francis (IL)	Wickes Stadium; University Center, MI	W 30–20		
November 5	at Grand Valley State	Lubbers Stadium; Allendale, MI (Battle of the Valleys)	L 20–27		
November 12	Ferris State	Wickes Stadium; University Center, MI	L 28–30		

== 1995 ==
1995 Saginaw Valley State Cardinals football
- Conference: Midwest Intercollegiate Football Conference
- Record: 7–3 (7–3 MIFC)
- Head coach: Jerry Kill (2nd season)
- Home stadium: Harvey Randall Wickes Memorial Stadium

1995 Midwest Intercollegiate Football Conference standings
	Conf.					Overall
Team	W		L		T	W		L		T
No. 3 Ferris State $^	10	–	0	–	0	12	–	1	–	0
Grand Valley State	8	–	2	–	0	8	–	3	–	0
Northern Michigan	7	–	3	–	0	7	–	3	–	0
Saginaw Valley State	7	–	3	–	0	7	–	3	–	0
Hillsdale	7	–	3	–	0	7	–	4	–	0
Michigan Tech	5	–	5	–	0	5	–	5	–	0
St. Francis (IL)	5	–	5	–	0	5	–	6	–	0
Indianapolis	3	–	7	–	0	3	–	8	–	0
Wayne State (MI)	3	–	7	–	0	3	–	8	–	0
Ashland	2	–	8	–	0	2	–	8	–	0
Northwood	2	–	8	–	0	2	–	8	–	0
Saint Joseph's (IN)	1	–	9	–	0	1	–	9	–	0
$ – Conference champion; ^ – NCAA Division II playoff participant; Rankings from NCAA Division II Football Committee poll

The 1995 Saginaw Valley State Cardinals football team represented Saginaw Valley State University (SVSU) as a member of the Midwest Intercollegiate Football Conference (MIFC) during the 1995 NCAA Division II football season. In their second year under head coach Jerry Kill, the Cardinals compiled a 7–3 record (7–3 in conference games), finished in a three-way tie for third place in the MIFC, and outscored opponents by a total of 359 to 234.

=== Schedule ===
Date	Opponent	Site	Result	Attendance	Source
September 9	at Northern Michigan	Superior Dome; Marquette, MI	L 12–13		
September 16	Wayne State (MI)	Wickes Stadium; University Center, MI	W 44–14		
September 23	at Northwood	Midland, MI (Axe Bowl)	W 24–21		
September 30	Michigan Tech	Wickes Stadium; University Center, MI	L 35–37		
October 7	Saint Joseph's (IN)	Wickes Stadium; University Center, MI	W 49–26		
October 14	at Ashland	Ashland, OH	W 32–20		
October 21	Indianapolis	Wickes Stadium; University Center, MI	W 42–6		
October 28	at St. Francis (IL)	Joliet, IL	W 55–30		
November 4	Grand Valley State	Wickes Stadium; University Center, MI (Battle of the Valleys)	W 24–21		
November 11	at Ferris State	Top Taggart Field; Big Rapids, MI	L 42–46		

== 1996 ==
1996 Saginaw Valley State Cardinals football
- Conference: Midwest Intercollegiate Football Conference
- Record: 7–3 (7–3 MIFC)
- Head coach: Jerry Kill (3rd season)
- Home stadium: Harvey Randall Wickes Memorial Stadium

1996 Midwest Intercollegiate Football Conference standings
	Conf.			Overall
Team	W		L	W		L
No. 3 Ferris State $^	9	–	1	10	–	2
Grand Valley State	8	–	2	8	–	3
Northern Michigan	7	–	3	7	–	3
No. 20 Saginaw Valley State	7	–	3	7	–	3
Hillsdale	6	–	4	6	–	5
Northwood	5	–	5	6	–	5
Ashland	4	–	6	4	–	7
Indianapolis	3	–	7	4	–	7
St. Francis (IL)	2	–	8	3	–	8
Michigan Tech	2	–	8	2	–	8
Wayne State (MI)	2	–	8	2	–	9
$ – Conference champion; ^ – NCAA Division II playoff participant; Rankings from NCAA Division II Football Committee poll

The 1996 Saginaw Valley State Cardinals football team represented Saginaw Valley State University (SVSU) as a member of the Midwest Intercollegiate Football Conference (MIFC) during the 1996 NCAA Division II football season. In their third year under head coach Jerry Kill, the Cardinals compiled a 7–3 record (7–3 in conference games), finished in third place in the MIFC, and outscored opponents by a total of 269 to 157.

=== Schedule ===
Date	Opponent	Site	Result	Attendance	Source
September 7	at Wayne State (MI)	Detroit, MI	W 21–3		
September 14	Northwood	Wickes Stadium; University Center, MI (Axe Bowl)	W 35–0		
September 21	at Michigan Tech	Sherman Field; Houghton, MI	W 50–14		
October 5	Ashland	Wickes Stadium; University Center, MI	W 20–16		
October 12	at Indianapolis	Indianapolis, IN	W 20–14		
October 19	St. Francis (IL)	Wickes Stadium; University Center, MI	W 24–12		
October 26	at Grand Valley State	Lubbers Stadium; Allendale, MI (Battle of the Valleys)	L 6–17		
November 2	Ferris State	Wickes Stadium; University Center, MI	L 17–26		
November 9	Hillsdale	Wickes Stadium; University Center, MI	W 34–3		
November 16	at Northern Michigan	Superior Dome; Marquette, MI	L 42–52		

== 1997 ==
1997 Saginaw Valley State Cardinals football
- Conference: Midwest Intercollegiate Football Conference
- Record: 9–2 (8–2 MIFC)
- Head coach: Jerry Kill (4th season)
- Home stadium: Harvey Randall Wickes Memorial Stadium

1997 Midwest Intercollegiate Football Conference standings
	Conf.			Overall
Team	W		L	W		L
No. 12 Ashland +^	9	–	1	9	–	2
Grand Valley State +	9	–	1	9	–	1
Saginaw Valley State	8	–	2	9	–	2
Indianapolis	7	–	3	8	–	3
Northern Michigan	6	–	4	7	–	4
Hillsdale	4	–	6	4	–	7
Ferris State	3	–	7	3	–	7
Northwood	3	–	7	3	–	7
Wayne State (MI)	3	–	7	3	–	8
Michigan Tech	2	–	8	2	–	8
St. Francis (IL)	1	–	9	1	–	9
+ – Conference co-champions; ^ – NCAA Division II playoff participant; Rankings from NCAA Division II Football Committee poll

The 1997 Saginaw Valley State Cardinals football team represented Saginaw Valley State University (SVSU) as a member of the Midwest Intercollegiate Football Conference (MIFC) during the 1997 NCAA Division II football season. In their fourth year under head coach Jerry Kill, the Cardinals compiled a 9–2 record (8–2 in conference games), finished in third place in the MIFC, and outscored opponents by a total of 457 to 209.

The team had two players rush for over 1,000 yards: quarterback Jeff Klopf with 1,161 yards; and Tim Neelands with 1,080 yards. Klopf also led the team with 830 passing yards and 1,991 yards of total offense. Neelands led in scoring with 102 points on 17 touchdowns while Klopf tallied 90 points on 15 touchdowns.

=== Schedule ===
Date	Opponent	Site	Result	Attendance	Source
September 6	Wayne State (MI)	Wickes Stadium; University Center, MI	W 73–7	3,900	
September 13	at Northwood	Hantz Stadium; Midland, MI (Axe Bowl)	W 59–21		
September 20	Michigan Tech	Wickes Stadium; University Center, MI	W 45–28	6,500	
September 27	at Fairmont State*	Fairmont, WV	W 56–7		
October 4	at Ashland	Ashland, OH	L 20–27		
October 11	Indianapolis	Wickes Stadium; University Center, MI	W 31–17	4,500	
October 18	at St. Francis (IL)	Joliet, IL	W 38–18		
October 25	Grand Valley State	Wickes Stadium; University Center, MI (Battle of the Valleys)	W 30–27	4,200	
November 1	at Ferris State	Top Taggart Field; Big Rapids, MI	L 23–24		
November 8	at Hillsdale	Frank "Muddy" Waters Stadium; Hillsdale, MI	W 30–13		
November 15	Northern Michigan	Wickes Stadium; University Center, MI	W 52–20		
*Non-conference game

== 1998 ==
1998 Saginaw Valley State Cardinals football
- Conference: Midwest Intercollegiate Football Conference
- Record: 9–2 (8–2 MIFC)
- Head coach: Jerry Kill (5th season)
- Home stadium: Harvey Randall Wickes Memorial Stadium

1998 Midwest Intercollegiate Football Conference standings
	Conf.			Overall
Team	W		L	W		L
No. 14 Grand Valley State $^	9	–	1	9	–	3
Saginaw Valley State	8	–	2	9	–	2
Indianapolis	8	–	2	8	–	2
Ashland	7	–	3	7	–	3
Northwood	7	–	3	7	–	3
Findlay	5	–	5	5	–	5
Mercyhurst	5	–	5	5	–	5
Ferris State	5	–	5	5	–	6
Northern Michigan	4	–	5	5	–	5
Michigan Tech	4	–	6	4	–	6
Hillsdale	3	–	7	3	–	8
Westminster (PA)	2	–	7	3	–	7
Wayne State (MI)	2	–	8	2	–	9
St. Francis (IL)	0	–	10	0	–	11
$ – Conference champion; ^ – NCAA Division II playoff participant; Rankings from NCAA Division II Football Committee poll

The 1998 Saginaw Valley State Cardinals football team represented Saginaw Valley State University (SVSU) as a member of the Midwest Intercollegiate Football Conference (MIFC) during the 1998 NCAA Division II football season. In their fifth and final year under head coach Jerry Kill, the Cardinals compiled a 9–2 record (8–2 in conference games), finished in second place in the MIFC, and outscored opponents by a total of 467 to 222.

In an Axe Bowl loss to rival Northwood, the teams set an NCAA Division II record with a combined total of 1,328 yards of offense (688 yards for Northwood and 626 yards for SVSU). SVSU's only other loss was to Grand Valley State, as the Cardinals took a 26-point lead but wound up losing by a 37–36 score.

Defensive end Lamar King was invited to play in three NCAA Division I all-star games and later played six years in the National Football League.

Kill resigned as SVSU's head football coach in January 1999 and accepted a post as head football coach at Emporia State in Kansas.

=== Schedule ===
Date	Opponent	Site	Result	Attendance	Source
September 5	Fairmont State*	Wickes Stadium; University Center, MI	W 23–8		
September 12	at Ferris State	Top Taggart Field; Big Rapids, MI	W 34–20		
September 19	Wayne State (MI)	Wickes Stadium; University Center, MI	W 44–13		
September 26	at Northern Michigan	Superior Dome; Marquette, MI	W 41–13		
October 3	Michigan Tech	Wickes Stadium; University Center, MI	W 37–22		
October 10	at Westminster (PA)	Memorial Field; New Wilmington, PA	W 48–6		
October 17	Grand Valley State	Wickes Stadium; University Center, MI (Battle of the Valleys)	L 36–37		
October 24	at Northwood	Juillerat Stadium; Midland, MI (Axe Bowl)	L 49–79	4,282	
October 31	Mercyhurst	Wickes Stadium; University Center, MI	W 69–0		
November 7	at Hillsdale	Frank "Muddy" Waters Stadium; Hillsdale, MI	W 27–24		
November 14	St. Francis (IL)	Wickes Stadium; University Center, MI	W 59–0		
*Non-conference game

== 1999 ==
1999 Saginaw Valley State Cardinals football
- Conference: Great Lakes Intercollegiate Athletic Conference
- Record: 4–6 (4–5 GLAIC)
- Head coach: Randy Awrey (1st season)
- Home stadium: Harvey Randall Wickes Memorial Stadium

1999 Great Lakes Intercollegiate Athletic Conference football standings
	Conf.			Overall
Team	W		L	W		L
No. 10 Northwood +	7	–	2	8	–	2
Ferris State +	7	–	2	7	–	3
Ashland	7	–	3	7	–	3
Hillsdale	6	–	3	8	–	3
Northern Michigan	6	–	3	6	–	4
Michigan Tech	6	–	4	6	–	4
Indianapolis	5	–	4	7	–	4
Grand Valley State	5	–	4	5	–	5
Mercyhurst	4	–	5	5	–	5
Saginaw Valley State	4	–	5	4	–	6
Westminster (PA)	2	–	8	3	–	8
Findlay	2	–	8	2	–	8
Wayne State (MI)	0	–	10	0	–	11
+ – Conference co-champions; Rankings from NCAA Division II Football Committee poll

The 1999 Saginaw Valley State Cardinals football team represented Saginaw Valley State University (SVSU) as a member of the Great Lakes Intercollegiate Athletic Conference (GLAIC) during the 1999 NCAA Division II football season. In their first year under head coach Randy Awrey, the Cardinals compiled a 4–6 record (4–5 in conference games), tied for ninth place in the GLIAC, and were outscored by a total of 362 to 272.

SVSU hired Awrey as its new head football coach in February 1999. He had previously been head coach for five years at Lakeland, compiling a 35–14–1 record there. He was a native of Michigan's Upper Peninsula who played in the same high school backfield as San Francisco 49ers coach Steve Mariucci and Michigan State basketball coach Tom Izzo.

=== Schedule ===
Date	Opponent	Site	Result	Attendance	Source
September 2	at Carson–Newman*	Burke–Tarr Stadium; Jefferson City, TN	L 7–41		
September 11	Ferris State	Wickes Stadium; University Center, MI	L 14–56		
September 18	at Wayne State (MI)	Detroit, MI	W 45–33		
September 25	Northern Michigan	Wickes Stadium; University Center, MI	L 28–42		
October 2	at Michigan Tech	Sherman Field; Houghton, MI	L 33–35		
October 9	Westminster (PA)	Wickes Stadium; University Center, MI	W 36–30		
October 16	at Grand Valley State	Lubbers Stadium; Allendale, MI (Battle of the Valleys)	L 7–31		
October 23	Northwood	Wickes Stadium; University Center, MI (Axe Bowl)	L 24–28		
October 30	at Mercyhurst	Erie, PA	W 40–33		
November 6	Hillsdale	Wickes Stadium; University Center, MI	W 38–33		
*Non-conference game
