= Michigan Tech Huskies football, 1990–1999 =

American college football seasons

1990–1999 Michigan Tech Huskies football
- Conference: Independent (1990–1993); Midwest Intercollegiate Football Conference (1994–1998); Great Lakes Intercollegiate Athletic Conference (1999)
- Head coach: Bernie Anderson (1987–2005)

The Michigan Tech Huskies football program, 1990–1999 represented Michigan Technological University in college football during the 1990s. Bernie Anderson was the team's head coach throughout the decade. The Huskies competed as an independent from 1990 to 1993, as a member of the Midwest Intercollegiate Football Conference (MIFC) from 1994 to 1998, and as member of the Great Lakes Intercollegiate Athletic Conference (GLIAC) in 1999. The 1992 Michigan Tech Huskies football team compiled a 9–1 record, broke the school's single-season scoring record, and outscored all opponents by a total 429 to 221.

== 1990 ==
1990 Michigan Tech Huskies football
- Conference: Independent
- Record: 6–4
- Head coach: Bernie Anderson (4th season)

1990 NCAA Division II independents football records
	Conf.			Overall
Team	W	L	T	W		L		T
No. 18 Wofford ^		–		9	–	3	–	0
No. 17 American International		–		7	–	3	–	0
No. 19 New Haven		–		7	–	3	–	0
Saint Mary's		–		7	–	3	–	0
Wayne State (NE)		–		7	–	4	–	0
Michigan Tech		–		6	–	4	–	0
Springfield		–		6	–	4	–	0
Southern Connecticut State		–		5	–	5	–	0
Central Connecticut		–		2	–	7	–	0
Cal Lutheran		–		2	–	8	–	0
Kentucky State		–		2	–	9	–	0
^ – NCAA Division II playoff participant; Rankings from NCAA Division II Football Committee poll

The 1990 Michigan Tech Huskies football team represented Michigan Technological University during the 1990 NCAA Division II football season. In their fourth season under head coach Bernie Anderson, the Huskies compiled a 6–4 record and outscored opponents by a total of 323 to 219.

=== Schedule ===
Date	Opponent	Site	Result	Attendance	Source
September 1	Ferris State	Houghton, MI	L 19–30	3,201	
September 15	at St. Norbert	De Pere, WI	W 28–12	1,189	
September 22	at Colorado Mines	Golden, CO	L 24–31	868	
September 29	Moorhead State	Houghton, MI	W 41–22	720	
October 6	Bemidji State	Houghton, MI	W 42–7	2,805	
October 13	at Winona State	Winona, MN	W 22–13	2,850	
October 20	Minnesota Duluth	Houghton, MI	L 15–33	1,120	
October 27	at Minnesota Morris	Morris, MN	L 28–49	3,047	
November 3	at Trinity International	Deerfield, IL	W 62–6	1,000	
November 10	at Olivet Nazarene	Bourbonnais, IL	W 42–16	2,500	

== 1991 ==
1991 Michigan Tech Huskies football
- Conference: Independent
- Record: 6–4
- Head coach: Bernie Anderson (5th season)
- Home stadium: Sherman Field

1991 NCAA Division II independents football records
	Conf.			Overall
Team	W	L	T	W		L		T
No. 20 Wofford ^		–		9	–	3	–	0
Springfield		–		7	–	3	–	0
Southern Connecticut State		–		6	–	3	–	0
UC Santa Barbara		–		5	–	3	–	0
Michigan Tech		–		6	–	4	–	0
Saint Mary's		–		6	–	5	–	0
Tennessee–Martin		–		5	–	6	–	0
Troy State		–		5	–	6	–	0
American International		–		4	–	5	–	1
New Haven		–		3	–	7	–	0
Wayne State (NE)		–		3	–	7	–	0
Kentucky State		–		2	–	9	–	0
Central Connecticut		–		1	–	8	–	1
Lees–McRae		–		1	–	9	–	0
^ – NCAA Division II playoff participant; Rankings from NCAA Division II Football Committee poll

The 1991 Michigan Tech Huskies football team represented Michigan Technological University during the 1991 NCAA Division II football season. In their fifth season under head coach Bernie Anderson, the Huskies compiled a 6–4 record and outscored opponents by a total of 343 to 157.

Key players included running back Jeremy Monroe, quarterback Kurt Coduti, and linebacker Dave Klein.

During the 1991 season, Greg Stoda of the Detroit Free Press reported that Michigan Tech's football budget included only $50,000 for coaching salaries; $80,000 for scholarships; $14,000 for recruiting (conducted principally by mail); and $75,000 for operating expenses (including travel and equipment).

=== Schedule ===
Date	Opponent	Site	Result	Attendance	Source
August 31	at Missouri S&T	Rolla, MO	L 21–24		
September 7	at Ferris State	Top Taggart Field; Big Rapids, MI	W 33–13		
September 14	St. Norbert	Sherman Field; Houghton, MI	W 41–0		
September 21	Trinity International	Sherman Field; Houghton, MI	W 58–7		
September 28	at Moorhead State	Moorhead, MN	L 21–28		
October 5	at Bemidji State	Bemidji, MN	W 35–0		
October 12	Winona State	Sherman Field; Houghton, MI	W 42–9	1,702	
October 19	at Minnesota-Duluth	Duluth, MN	L 21–28		
October 26	Minnesota-Morris	Sherman Field; Houghton, MI	W 46–14		
November 9	Olivet Nazarene	Sherman Field; Houghton, MI	L 25–34		

== 1992 ==
1992 Michigan Tech Huskies football
- Conference: Independent
- Record: 9–1
- Head coach: Bernie Anderson (6th season)

1992 NCAA Division II independents football records
	Conf.			Overall
Team	W	L	T	W		L		T
No. 5 New Haven ^		–		12	–	1	–	0
Troy State		–		10	–	1	–	0
Michigan Tech		–		9	–	1	–	0
Southern Connecticut State		–		6	–	4	–	0
Saint Mary's		–		5	–	4	–	0
Wayne State (NE)		–		5	–	4	–	1
Wofford		–		6	–	5	–	0
American International		–		4	–	6	–	0
Kentucky State		–		4	–	7	–	0
Springfield		–		3	–	6	–	0
Central Connecticut		–		1	–	8	–	0
Lees–McRae		–		1	–	9	–	0
West Texas State		–		1	–	9	–	0
Northwood		–		0	–	9	–	0
^ – NCAA Division II playoff participant; Rankings from NCAA Division II Football Committee poll

The 1992 Michigan Tech Huskies football team represented Michigan Technological University during the 1992 NCAA Division II football season. In their sixth season under head coach Bernie Anderson, the Huskies compiled a 9–1 record and outscored opponents by a total of 429 to 221.

=== Schedule ===
Date	Opponent	Site	Result	Attendance	Source
September 5	Wisconsin-Stevens Point	Houghton, MI	W 25–13		
September 12	at Northern State (SD)	Aberdeen, SD	W 42–26		
September 19	at Minnesota-Morris	Morris, MN	W 40–7		
September 26	at Bemidji State	Bemidji, MN	W 47–7		
October 3	at Winona State	Winona, MN	W 38–19		
October 10	Minnesota-Duluth	Houghton, MI	W 40–20		
October 24	Manitoba	Houghton, MI	W 76–34		
October 31	at Wayne State	Wayne, NE	W 48–38		
November 7	vs. Valparaiso	Marquette, MI	W 38–21		
November 14	vs. Moorhead State	Minneapolis, MN (Metrodome Classic)	L 35–36		

== 1993 ==
1993 Michigan Tech Huskies football
- Conference: Independent
- Record: 6–4
- Head coach: Bernie Anderson (7th season)

1993 NCAA Division II independents football records
	Conf.			Overall
Team	W	L	T	W		L		T
No. 2 New Haven ^		–		11	–	1	–	0
Wayne State (NE)		–		9	–	1	–	0
No. 5 Portland State ^		–		8	–	3	–	0
Wofford		–		7	–	3	–	1
Michigan Tech		–		6	–	4	–	0
Gannon		–		6	–	4	–	0
Kentucky Wesleyan		–		6	–	4	–	0
Mercyhurst		–		5	–	5	–	0
West Texas A&M		–		3	–	6	–	0
Southern Connecticut State		–		3	–	7	–	1
American International		–		3	–	7	–	0
Jacksonville State		–		3	–	7	–	0
Sacred Heart		–		3	–	7	–	0
Springfield		–		3	–	7	–	0
Lees–McRae		–		2	–	6	–	1
Kentucky State		–		2	–	9	–	0
^ – NCAA Division II playoff participant; Rankings from NCAA Division II Football Committee poll

The 1993 Michigan Tech Huskies football team represented Michigan Technological University during the 1993 NCAA Division II football season. In their seventh season under head coach Bernie Anderson, the Huskies compiled a 6–4 record and outscored opponents by a total of 303 to 228.

=== Schedule ===
Date	Opponent	Site	Result	Attendance	Source
September 4	at Wisconsin-Stevens Point	Stevens Point, WI	W 43–21		
September 11	Northern State (SD)	Houghton, MI	W 30–15		
September 18	Minnesota-Morris	Houghton, MI	W 42–10		
September 25	at Bemidji State	Bemidji, MN	W 52–23		
October 2	Winona State	Houghton, MI	W 24–13		
October 9	at Minnesota-Duluth	Duluth, MN	L 3–32		
October 23	at Saginaw Valley State	Wickes Stadium; University Center, MI	W 21–7		
October 30	Wayne State (NE)	Houghton, MI	L 26–34		
November 6	at Valparaiso	Brown Field; Valparaiso, IN	L 20–25		
November 12	at Southwest State (MN)	Minneapolis, MN (Metrodome Classic)	L 42–48		

== 1994 ==
1994 Michigan Tech Huskies football
- Conference: Midwest Intercollegiate Football Conference
- Record: 4–7 (3–7 MIFC)
- Head coach: Bernie Anderson (8th season)

1994 Midwest Intercollegiate Football Conference standings
	Conf.					Overall
Team	W		L		T	W		L		T
No. 5 Ferris State $^	10	–	0	–	0	11	–	1	–	0
No. 18 Grand Valley State ^	8	–	2	–	0	8	–	4	–	0
Hillsdale	7	–	3	–	0	7	–	4	–	0
Ashland	6	–	4	–	0	6	–	4	–	0
Saginaw Valley State	6	–	4	–	0	6	–	4	–	0
Wayne State (MI)	6	–	4	–	0	6	–	5	–	0
Northern Michigan	5	–	5	–	0	5	–	5	–	0
Michigan Tech	3	–	7	–	0	4	–	7	–	0
Saint Joseph's (IN)	3	–	7	–	0	4	–	7	–	0
Indianapolis	2	–	7	–	1	2	–	7	–	1
Northwood	2	–	7	–	1	2	–	7	–	1
St. Francis (IL)	1	–	9	–	0	1	–	10	–	0
$ – Conference champion; ^ – NCAA Division II playoff participant; Rankings from NCAA Division II Football Committee poll

The 1994 Michigan Tech Huskies football team represented Michigan Technological University as a member of the Midwest Intercollegiate Football Conference (MIFC) during the 1994 NCAA Division II football season. In their eighth season under head coach Bernie Anderson, the Huskies compiled a 4–7 record (3–7 in conference games) and were outscored by a total of 287 to 208.

=== Schedule ===
Date	Opponent	Site	Result	Attendance	Source
September 3	Missouri S&T*	Houghton, MI	W 20–6		
September 10	at Northwood	Midland, MI	L 13–14		
September 17	Ashland	Houghton, MI	L 7–35	2,044	
September 24	at Saint Joseph's (IN)	Rensselaer, IN	W 31–28		
October 1	Saginaw Valley State	Houghton, MI	W 38–36		
October 8	at Indianapolis	Indianapolis, IN	L 18–20		
October 15	St. Francis (IL)	Houghton, MI	W 35–6		
October 22	at Grand Valley State	Lubbers Stadium; Allendale, MI	L 7–33		
October 29	Ferris State	Houghton, MI	L 19–30		
November 5	at Wayne State (MI)	Detroit, MI	L 13–31		
November 12	Hillsdale	Houghton, MI	L 7–48	722	
*Non-conference game

== 1995 ==
1995 Michigan Tech Huskies football
- Conference: Midwest Intercollegiate Football Conference
- Record: 5–5 (5–5 MIFC)
- Head coach: Bernie Anderson (9th season)

1995 Midwest Intercollegiate Football Conference standings
	Conf.					Overall
Team	W		L		T	W		L		T
No. 3 Ferris State $^	10	–	0	–	0	12	–	1	–	0
Grand Valley State	8	–	2	–	0	8	–	3	–	0
Northern Michigan	7	–	3	–	0	7	–	3	–	0
Saginaw Valley State	7	–	3	–	0	7	–	3	–	0
Hillsdale	7	–	3	–	0	7	–	4	–	0
Michigan Tech	5	–	5	–	0	5	–	5	–	0
St. Francis (IL)	5	–	5	–	0	5	–	6	–	0
Indianapolis	3	–	7	–	0	3	–	8	–	0
Wayne State (MI)	3	–	7	–	0	3	–	8	–	0
Ashland	2	–	8	–	0	2	–	8	–	0
Northwood	2	–	8	–	0	2	–	8	–	0
Saint Joseph's (IN)	1	–	9	–	0	1	–	9	–	0
$ – Conference champion; ^ – NCAA Division II playoff participant; Rankings from NCAA Division II Football Committee poll

The 1995 Michigan Tech Huskies football team represented Michigan Technological University as a member of the Midwest Intercollegiate Football Conference (MIFC) during the 1995 NCAA Division II football season. In their eighth season under head coach Bernie Anderson, the Huskies compiled a 5–5 record (5–5 in conference games) and outscored opponents by a total of 308 to 268.

=== Schedule ===
Date	Opponent	Site	Result	Attendance	Source
September 9	Northwood	Houghton, MI	W 39–25		
September 16	at Ashland	Ashland, OH	L 28–34		
September 23	Saint Joseph's (IN)	Houghton, MI	W 44–23		
September 30	at Saginaw Valley State	Saginaw, MI	W 37–35		
October 7	Indianapolis	Houghton, MI	W 21–14		
October 14	at St. Francis (IL)	Joliet, IL	L 21–23		
October 21	Grand Valley State	Houghton, MI	L 52–54		
October 28	at No. 3 Ferris State	Big Rapids, MI	L 17–38		
November 4	Wayne State (MI)	Houghton, MI	W 43–3		
November 11	at Hillsdale	Hillsdale, MI	L 6–21		
Rankings from NCAA Division II Football Committee Poll released prior to the game

== 1996 ==
1996 Michigan Tech Huskies football
- Conference: Midwest Intercollegiate Football Conference
- Record: 2–8 (2–8 MIFC)
- Head coach: Bernie Anderson (10th season)

1996 Midwest Intercollegiate Football Conference standings
	Conf.			Overall
Team	W		L	W		L
No. 3 Ferris State $^	9	–	1	10	–	2
Grand Valley State	8	–	2	8	–	3
Northern Michigan	7	–	3	7	–	3
No. 20 Saginaw Valley State	7	–	3	7	–	3
Hillsdale	6	–	4	6	–	5
Northwood	5	–	5	6	–	5
Ashland	4	–	6	4	–	7
Indianapolis	3	–	7	4	–	7
St. Francis (IL)	2	–	8	3	–	8
Michigan Tech	2	–	8	2	–	8
Wayne State (MI)	2	–	8	2	–	9
$ – Conference champion; ^ – NCAA Division II playoff participant; Rankings from NCAA Division II Football Committee poll

The 1996 Michigan Tech Huskies football team represented Michigan Technological University as a member of the Midwest Intercollegiate Football Conference (MIFC) during the 1996 NCAA Division II football season. In their tenth season under head coach Bernie Anderson, the Huskies compiled a 2–8 record (2–8 in conference games) and were outscored by a total of 317 to 181.

=== Schedule ===
Date	Opponent	Site	Result	Attendance	Source
August 29	at Northwood	Midland, MI	L 28–38		
September 7	Ashland	Houghton, MI	L 20–35		
September 21	Saginaw Valley State	Houghton, MI	L 14–50		
September 28	at Indianapolis	Indianapolis, IN	W 19–14		
October 5	St. Francis (IL)	Houghton, MI	W 38–18		
October 12	at Grand Valley State	Allendale, MI	L 7–56		
October 19	Ferris State	Houghton, MI	L 6–31		
October 26	at Wayne State (MI)	Detroit, MI	L 22–34		
November 2	Hilsdale	Houghton, MI	L 10–21		
November 9	Northern Michigan	Houghton, MI	L 17–20		

== 1997 ==
1997 Michigan Tech Huskies football
- Conference: Midwest Intercollegiate Football Conference
- Record: 2–8 (2–8 MIFC)
- Head coach: Bernie Anderson (11th season)

1997 Midwest Intercollegiate Football Conference standings
	Conf.			Overall
Team	W		L	W		L
No. 12 Ashland +^	9	–	1	9	–	2
Grand Valley State +	9	–	1	9	–	1
Saginaw Valley State	8	–	2	9	–	2
Indianapolis	7	–	3	8	–	3
Northern Michigan	6	–	4	7	–	4
Hillsdale	4	–	6	4	–	7
Ferris State	3	–	7	3	–	7
Northwood	3	–	7	3	–	7
Wayne State (MI)	3	–	7	3	–	8
Michigan Tech	2	–	8	2	–	8
St. Francis (IL)	1	–	9	1	–	9
+ – Conference co-champions; ^ – NCAA Division II playoff participant; Rankings from NCAA Division II Football Committee poll

The 1997 Michigan Tech Huskies football team represented Michigan Technological University as a member of the Midwest Intercollegiate Football Conference (MIFC) during the 1997 NCAA Division II football season. In their eleventh season under head coach Bernie Anderson, the Huskies compiled a 2–8 record (2–8 in conference games) and were outscored by a total of 351 to 244.

=== Schedule ===
Date	Opponent	Site	Result	Attendance	Source
August 30	Northwood	Sherman Field; Houghton, MI	L 14–52		
September 6	at Ashland	Ashland, OH	L 7–31		
September 20	at Saginaw Valley State	Wickes Stadium; University Center, MI	L 28–45	6,500	
September 27	Indianapolis	Sherman Field; Houghton, MI	L 29–35		
October 4	at St. Francis (IL)	Joliet Memorial Stadium; Joliet, IL	W 52–28		
October 11	Grand Valley State	Sherman Field; Houghton, MI	L 21–49		
October 18	at Ferris State	Top Taggart Field; Big Rapids, MI	W 34–24		
October 25	Wayne State (MI)	Sherman Field; Houghton, MI	L 28–35		
November 1	at Hillsdale	Frank "Muddy" Waters Stadium; Hillsdale, MI	L 19–35		
November 8	at Northern Michigan	Marquette, MI	L 12–17		

== 1998 ==
1998 Michigan Tech Huskies football
- Conference: Midwest Intercollegiate Football Conference
- Record: 4–6 (4–6 MIFC)
- Head coach: Bernie Anderson (12th season)

1998 Midwest Intercollegiate Football Conference standings
	Conf.			Overall
Team	W		L	W		L
No. 14 Grand Valley State $^	9	–	1	9	–	3
Saginaw Valley State	8	–	2	9	–	2
Indianapolis	8	–	2	8	–	2
Ashland	7	–	3	7	–	3
Northwood	7	–	3	7	–	3
Findlay	5	–	5	5	–	5
Mercyhurst	5	–	5	5	–	5
Ferris State	5	–	5	5	–	6
Northern Michigan	4	–	5	5	–	5
Michigan Tech	4	–	6	4	–	6
Hillsdale	3	–	7	3	–	8
Westminster (PA)	2	–	7	3	–	7
Wayne State (MI)	2	–	8	2	–	9
St. Francis (IL)	0	–	10	0	–	11
$ – Conference champion; ^ – NCAA Division II playoff participant; Rankings from NCAA Division II Football Committee poll

The 1998 Michigan Tech Huskies football team represented Michigan Technological University as a member of the Midwest Intercollegiate Football Conference (MIFC) during the 1998 NCAA Division II football season. In their eleventh season under head coach Bernie Anderson, the Huskies compiled a 4–6 record (4–6 in conference games) and were outscored by a total of 316 to 263.

=== Schedule ===
Date	Opponent	Site	Result	Attendance	Source
September 3	at Northwood	Juillerat Stadium; Midland, MI	W 44–34		
September 12	at Mercyhurst	Erie, PA	W 24–21		
September 19	Hillsdale	Houghton, MI	W 23–20		
September 26	at St. Francis (IL)	Joliet, IL	W 28–6		
October 3	at Saginaw Valley State	Wickes Stadium; University Center, MI	L 22–37		
October 10	Ashland	Houghton, MI	L 24–45		
October 17	at Northern Michigan	Superior Dome; Marquette, MI	L 7–18		
October 24	Ferris State	Houghton, MI	L 46–67		
October 31	at Wayne State (MI)	Detroit, MI	L 22–25		
November 7	Grand Valley State	Houghton, MI	L 23–43		

== 1999 ==
1999 Michigan Tech Huskies football
- Conference: Great Lakes Intercollegiate Athletic Conference
- Record: 6–4 (6–4 GLIAC)
- Head coach: Bernie Anderson (13th season)

1999 Great Lakes Intercollegiate Athletic Conference football standings
	Conf.			Overall
Team	W		L	W		L
No. 10 Northwood +	7	–	2	8	–	2
Ferris State +	7	–	2	7	–	3
Ashland	7	–	3	7	–	3
Hillsdale	6	–	3	8	–	3
Northern Michigan	6	–	3	6	–	4
Michigan Tech	6	–	4	6	–	4
Indianapolis	5	–	4	7	–	4
Grand Valley State	5	–	4	5	–	5
Mercyhurst	4	–	5	5	–	5
Saginaw Valley State	4	–	5	4	–	6
Westminster (PA)	2	–	8	3	–	8
Findlay	2	–	8	2	–	8
Wayne State (MI)	0	–	10	0	–	11
+ – Conference co-champions; Rankings from NCAA Division II Football Committee poll

The 1999 Michigan Tech Huskies football team represented Michigan Technological University as a member of the Great Lakes Intercollegiate Athletic Conference (GLIAC) during the 1999 NCAA Division II football season. In their 13th season under head coach Bernie Anderson, the Huskies compiled a 6–4 record (6–4 in conference games) and were outscored by a total of 247 to 197.

=== Schedule ===
Date	Opponent	Site	Result	Attendance	Source
September 4	Westminster (PA)	Houghton, MI	W 10–0		
September 11	Mercyhurst	Houghton, MI	W 41–26		
September 18	a Hillsdale	Muddy Waters Field; Hillsdale, MI	W 31–7		
October 2	Saginaw Valley State	Houghton, MI	W 35–33		
October 9	at Ashland	Ashland, OH	L 14–39		
October 16	Northern Michigan	Houghton, MI	L 7–31		
October 23	at Ferris State	Big Rapids, MI	L 7–66		
October 30	Wayne State (MI)	Houghton, MI	W 22–10		
November 6	at Grand Valley State	Lubbers Stadium; Allendale, MI	L 7–21	2,775	
November 13	Northwood	Houghton, MI	W 23–14		
