= George Ihler =

American football player and coach (born 1943)

Biographical details
- Born: March 4, 1943 (age 83)

Playing career
- 1962–1964: Western Michigan

Coaching career (HC unless noted)
- 1968–1970: Owosso HS (MI)
- 1971–1982: Arthur Hill HS (MI)
- 1983–1993: Saginaw Valley State
- 1994–1998: Freeland HS (MI)
- 1999–2001: Heritage HS (MI) (assistant)
- 2002–2003: Hemlock HS (MI)

Head coaching record
- Overall: 61–52–1 (college); 151–54–2 (high school)
- Tournaments: 2–2 (NAIA D-II playoffs)

Accomplishments and honors

Championships
- 2 GLIAC (1983–1984)

George Ihler (born March 4, 1943) is an American former football player and coach. Ihler was the head football coach at Saginaw Valley State University in University Center, Michigan for 11 seasons, from 1983 until 1993. He won eight Saginaw Valley League titles and a Class A state championship in 1973 when his Lumberjacks were undefeated and unscored upon (443–0). His coaching record at Saginaw Valley State was 61–52–1. After leaving Saginaw Valley College he coached Freeland High School for several years and Hemlock High School for one year. He is a native of Marinette, Wisconsin and attended Marinette High School.

== Head coaching record ==
=== College ===
| Year | Team | Overall | Conference | Standing | Bowl/playoffs | NAIA^{#} |
|---|---|---|---|---|---|---|
Saginaw Valley State Cardinals (Great Lakes Intercollegiate Athletic Conference) (1983–1989)
| 1983 | Saginaw Valley State | 9–3 | 6–0 | 1st | L NAIA Division I Semifinal | 7 |
| 1984 | Saginaw Valley State | 8–3 | 6–0 | 1st | L NAIA Division I Semifinal | 6 |
| 1985 | Saginaw Valley State | 4–5–1 | 4–1–1 | 2nd | | |
| 1986 | Saginaw Valley State | 5–4 | 3–2 | 3rd | | |
| 1987 | Saginaw Valley State | 5–5 | 2–3 | T–3rd | | |
| 1988 | Saginaw Valley State | 4–5 | 2–3 | 4th | | 25 |
| 1989 | Saginaw Valley State | 3–6 | 2–3 | T–4th | | |
Saginaw Valley State Cardinals (Midwest Intercollegiate Football Conference) (1990–1993)
| 1990 | Saginaw Valley State | 6–5 | 5–5 | 7th | | |
| 1991 | Saginaw Valley State | 6–5 | 5–5 | T–4th | | |
| 1992 | Saginaw Valley State | 7–4 | 6–4 | 6th | | |
| 1993 | Saginaw Valley State | 4–7 | 4–6 | 8th | | |
| Saginaw Valley State: | | 61–52–1 | 45–32–1 | | | |
| Total: | | 61–52–1 | | | | |
National championship Conference title Conference division title or championship game berth

=== High school ===
| Year | Team | Overall | Conference | Standing | Bowl/playoffs |
|---|---|---|---|---|---|
Owosso Trojans (Big 9 Conference) (1968–1970)
| 1968 | Owosso | 7–2 | 6–1 | 2nd | |
| 1969 | Owosso | 6–2–1 | 5–1–1 | | |
| 1970 | Owosso | 7–2 | 6–1 | | |
| Owosso: | | 20–6–1 | 17–3–1 | | |
Arthur Hill Lumberjacks (Saginaw Valley League) (1971–1982)
| 1971 | Arthur Hill | 4–4–1 | 2–3 | (West) | |
| 1972 | Arthur Hill | 8–1 | 5–0 | 1st (West) | |
| 1973 | Arthur Hill | 9–0 | 5–0 | 1st (West) | |
| 1974 | Arthur Hill | 5–3 | 3–2 | (West) | |
| 1975 | Arthur Hill | 8–1 | 5–0 | 1st (West) | |
| 1976 | Arthur Hill | 5–4 | 4–0 | 1st (West) | |
| 1977 | Arthur Hill | 8–1 | 4–0 | 1st (West) | |
| 1978 | Arthur Hill | 5–4 | 2–1 | 2nd (West) | |
| 1979 | Arthur Hill | 8–1 | 3–0 | 1st (West) | |
| 1980 | Arthur Hill | 6–3 | 5–1 | 2nd | |
| 1981 | Arthur Hill | 8–1 | 5–0 | 1st | |
| 1982 | Arthur Hill | 9–2 | 4–1 | 2nd | |
| Arthur Hill: | | 83–25–1 | 47–8 | | |
Freeland Falcons (Tri-Valley Conference) (1994–1998)
| 1994 | Freeland | 6–3 | 4–3 | (West) | |
| 1995 | Freeland | 11–1 | 7–0 | 1st (West) | |
| 1996 | Freeland | 9–2 | 6–1 | 1st (West) | |
| 1997 | Freeland | 5–4 | 3–4 | (West) | |
| 1998 | Freeland | 9–3 | 5–2 | (West) | |
| Freeland: | | 40–13 | 25–10 | | |
Hemlock Huskies (Tri-Valley Conference) (2002–2003)
| 2002 | Hemlock | 4–5 | 3–4 | (West) | |
| 2003 | Hemlock | 4–5 | 3–4 | (West) | |
| Hemlock: | | 8–10 | 6–8 | | |
| Total: | | 151–54–2 | | | |
National championship Conference title Conference division title or championship game berth
