= Jerry Kill =

American football player and coach (born 1961)

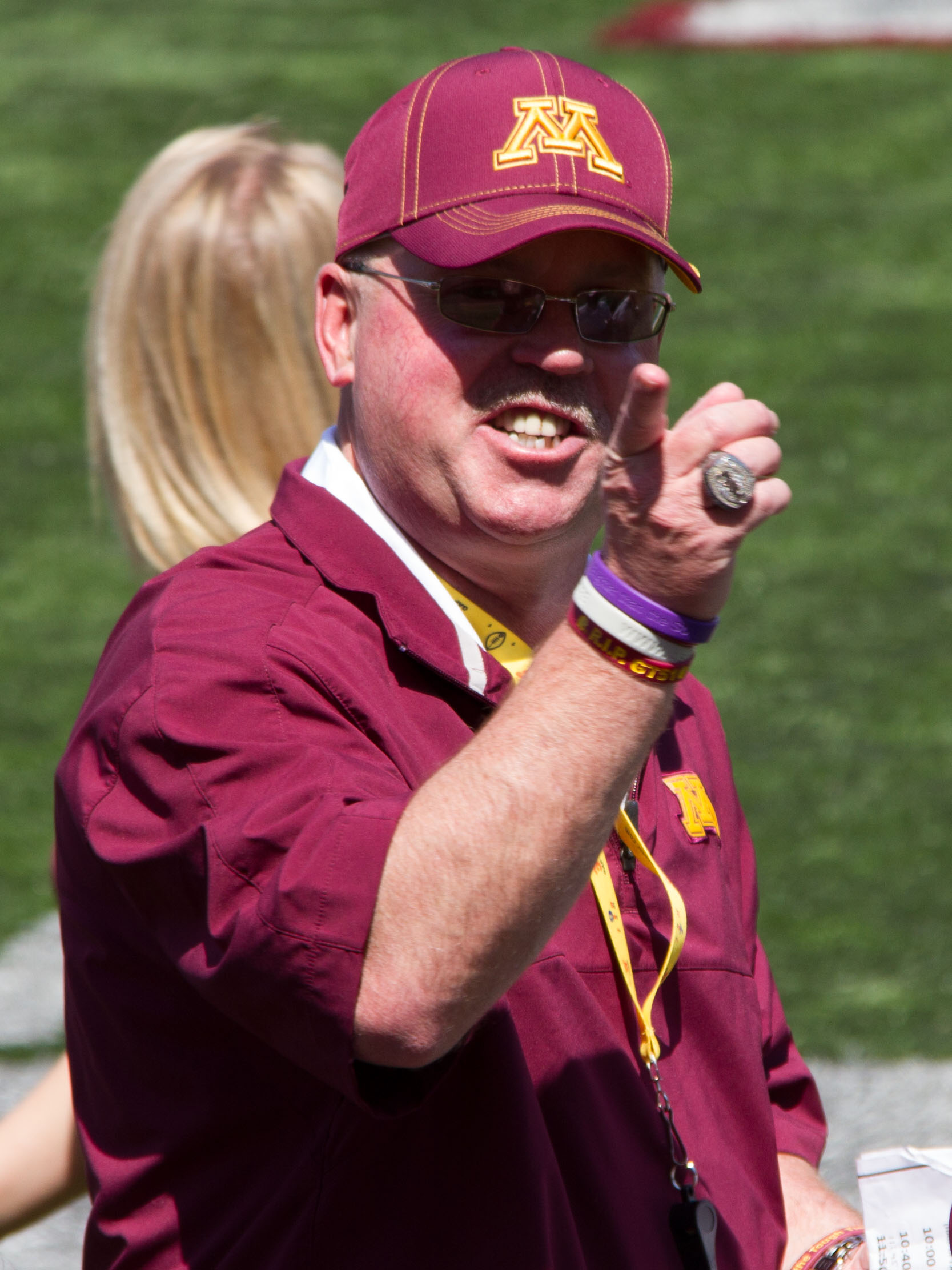
- Kill at the 2013 Minnesota Spring Game

Current position
- Title: Consultant
- Team: Vanderbilt
- Conference: SEC

Biographical details
- Born: August 24, 1961 (age 64); Cheney, Kansas, U.S.

Playing career
- 1979–1982: Southwestern (KS)
- Position: Linebacker

Coaching career (HC unless noted)
- 1985–1987: Pittsburg State (DC)
- 1988–1990: Webb City HS (MO)
- 1991–1993: Pittsburg State (OC)
- 1994–1998: Saginaw Valley State
- 1999–2000: Emporia State
- 2001–2007: Southern Illinois
- 2008–2010: Northern Illinois
- 2011–2015: Minnesota
- 2017: Rutgers (OC/QB)
- 2019: Virginia Tech (asst. to HC)
- 2020–2021: TCU (asst. to HC)
- 2021: TCU (interim HC)
- 2022–2023: New Mexico State
- 2024–present: Vanderbilt (consultant)

Administrative career (AD unless noted)
- 2016: Kansas State (assoc. AD)
- 2018–2019: Southern Illinois (interim AD)
- 2019: Southern Illinois

Head coaching record
- Overall: 175–115 (college)
- Bowls: 1–6
- Tournaments: 4–5 (NCAA D-I-AA/FCS playoffs)

Accomplishments and honors

Championships
- 1 MSHSAA Class 4A (1989); 3 Gateway Football (2003–2005); 1 MAC West Division (2010)

Awards
- Eddie Robinson Award (2004); Big Ten Coach of the Year (2014); Kansas Sports Hall of Fame (2016); C-USA Coach of the Year (2023)

Jerry R. Kill (born August 24, 1961) is an American college football coach who currently serves as a consultant at Vanderbilt. He was the head coach at New Mexico State University from 2022 to 2023. He played college football at Southwestern College in Winfield, Kansas, from 1979 to 1982. Kill served as the head coach at Saginaw Valley State University, Emporia State University, Southern Illinois University Carbondale, Northern Illinois University and the University of Minnesota, as well as serving as the interim head coach for the final four games of the 2021 season at TCU. Leading his teams to thirteen Bowl games, he has won one (2022 Quick Lane Bowl while head coach of the New Mexico State Aggies).

Kill has also served as an athletic department administrator, most recently at Southern Illinois University as an assistant to the Chancellor and athletic director. He was also briefly at Kansas State as associate athletic director.

During the course of his career he was credited with bringing several programs to new heights, and these successes led to increasingly more prestigious coaching positions. Despite retiring from the game in 2015 for health reasons, Kill returned to coaching in 2020 after accepting a special assistant's job at TCU and was named the interim head coach on October 31, 2021, after the resignation of Gary Patterson.

== Early life and playing career ==
Kill was born in Cheney, Kansas. He was raised in a working-class family and became the first member of his family to graduate from college.

== Coaching career ==
=== Saginaw Valley State ===
Kill landed his first college head coaching job as the fourth football coach at Saginaw Valley State University in 1994, where he produced five consecutive winning seasons, including back-to-back 9–2 campaigns in 1997 and 1998. Kill compiled a 38–14 record in five years as head coach. His teams led the NCAA's Division II in rushing each of his last two years and his last season was second in the nation in total offense (498.3) and scoring (42.5).

He is ranked third at Saginaw Valley State in total wins and second in winning percentage (as of the 2007 season).

=== Emporia State ===
Kill was the 20th head football coach for Emporia State University in Emporia, Kansas, and held that position for two seasons, from 1999 until 2000. His overall coaching record at Emporia State was 11–11. As of completion of the 2007 season, this ranked him tenth at Emporia State in total wins and ninth in winning percentage.

=== Southern Illinois ===
Kill was named to the head coaching post at Southern Illinois University Carbondale in 2001. In 2004, Kill's Salukis went a perfect 9–0 against Division I-AA opponents and outscored competitors by more than 30 points per game. Southern Illinois finished 7–0 in Gateway Football Conference games, earned the No. 1 ranking for the final ten weeks of the year, and garnered the top seed in the 2004 postseason.

At Southern Illinois, Kill was the first coach to produce four consecutive winning seasons and is credited with turning the football team around to a winning program. On September 26, 2006, he became the school's all-time leader in winning percentage after defeating Indiana State, 55–3.

=== Northern Illinois ===
In December 2007, Northern Illinois University in DeKalb, announced that Kill had been hired as its new head coach. He replaced Joe Novak, who retired after developing the Huskies into a successful program over 12 seasons, though just one bowl win. Before Kill's first season at Northern Illinois began, NIU was ranked No. 6 in ESPN's Bottom 10. The team finished the 2008 regular season with a 6–6 record. The six wins secured bowl eligibility and an invitation to the Independence Bowl was accepted. Northern Illinois was defeated by Louisiana Tech, 17–10, in the bowl game despite outgaining the Bulldogs in rushing and passing yardage.

In 2010, Northern Illinois had a nine-game win streak and reached the MAC Championship Game, losing to Miami. NIU finished 10–3 for the year. In December, days after the losing the conference championship to Miami, Kill accepted the position of head coach for the Minnesota Golden Gophers. His announcement came less than two weeks before the Huskies were scheduled to play in the Humanitarian Bowl. Leaving the team in the manner he did (many teammates learned about his new job via Twitter instead of from Kill himself) dealt an emotional blow to the members of the team; quarterback Chandler Harnish saying about Kill's departure, "I have a horrible taste in my mouth". Additionally, besides the emotional impact, USA Today noted, "The timing of the announcement further hurts the program due to Kill most likely taking the bulk of his staff to Minnesota."

Thus, Kill left NIU without ever winning a bowl game. Furthermore, the fact that Kill left NIU before the team's bowl game added fuel to the debate about whether or not the NCAA should prohibit coaches from abandoning their teams before their final bowl game.

=== Minnesota ===
The University of Minnesota hired Jerry Kill on December 6, 2010. He took over for Tim Brewster who was fired during the middle of the season. Kill brought much of his NIU staff with him to Minnesota, including offensive coordinator Matt Limegrover, defensive coordinator Tracy Claeys, and special teams coordinator Jay Sawvel. While his first season in Minnesota was not particularly successful (finishing with a 3–9 record and one of only two non-bowl eligible teams in the Big Ten), Kill was in the headlines most often due to his health issues. A highlight of the 2011 season was a win over rival Iowa. In Kill's second season (2012), Minnesota improved to 6–7, including an appearance in the Meineke Car Care of Texas Bowl where they lost to Texas Tech 34–31.

After Kill led Minnesota to a 4–1 start in the 2013 season, a seizure prevented him from attending Minnesota's game at Michigan. He announced on October 10, 2013 that he would take a leave of absence to focus on epilepsy treatment. With his longtime defensive coordinator Tracy Claeys serving as acting head coach, Kill watched their next game, a win over Northwestern, from the press box. Minnesota went on to win four consecutive Big Ten games for the first time since 1973. Even without Kill present on the field, the Gophers finished with an 8–5 record. The American Football Association named Kill the Region 3 Coach of the Year.

Kill returned to the field for the 2014 football season. For the first six games of the season, the Golden Gophers went 5–1, with their only loss to TCU (30–7), and conference wins over Michigan (30–14) and Northwestern (24–17). The team ended with an 8–5 record, with losses to TCU, Illinois (28–24), Ohio State (31–24), Wisconsin (34–24), and Mizzou (33–17) at the Citrus Bowl. Surprisingly, Kill was awarded the Big Ten Coach of the Year award for the 2014 season.

Jerry Kill began the 2015 season with the Gophers, building a 4–3 record. However, worsening health problems led him to retire from his position as head coach on October 28, 2015. He was succeeded by defensive coordinator Tracy Claeys.

=== Southern Illinois AD ===
Kill returned to Southern Illinois in 2018 as a special assistant to the chancellor, later becoming athletic director. He remained in that role through September 2019, when he returned to the coaching ranks at Virginia Tech.

=== Virginia Tech ===
Kill was contacted by Virginia Tech head football coach Justin Fuente to be his special assistant after three games of the 2019 football season.

=== TCU ===
TCU head coach Gary Patterson hired Kill away from Virginia Tech in January 2020 to be a special assistant, overseeing the offense. Although close friends, the two had never worked together before. Kill took over as interim head coach midway through the 2021 season after TCU and Patterson parted ways.

=== New Mexico State ===
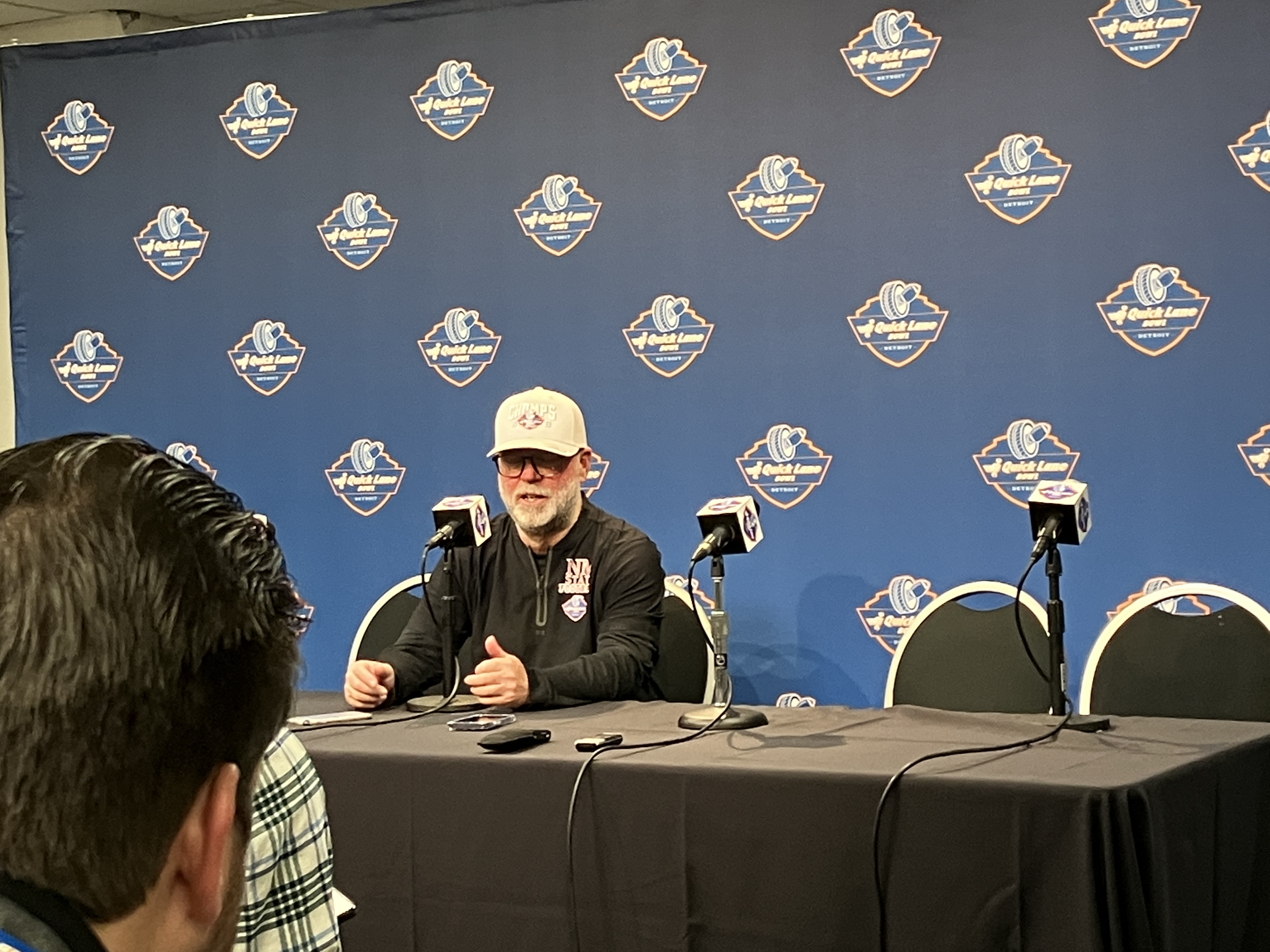
Kill following the 2022 Quick Lane Bowl

On November 24, 2021, it was reported that Kill would be the next head coach at New Mexico State University following the 2021 season. In his first season, the Aggies won their 2nd bowl game since 1960 and finished 7-6. Following the Aggies' victory in the Quick Lane Bowl, Kill got a tattoo on his right arm to commemorate his team's success. Kill stepped down following the 2023 season, during which the team posted a 10–5 record and a trip to the New Mexico Bowl.

=== Vanderbilt ===
Kill joined the staff at Vanderbilt for the 2024 season, as chief consultant to the head coach and senior offensive advisor.

== Personal life, health issues, and charity work ==
Jerry Kill is divorced from Rebecca Kill, and they have two daughters, Krystal and Tasha.

Kill is a close friend of Gary Patterson, former head football coach at Texas Christian University. Both men played football for Dennis Franchione and each worked for him as an assistant coach. Kill served as the best man in Patterson's wedding.

Kill suffered a seizure toward the end of a game in October 2005. Subsequently, Kill was diagnosed with kidney cancer, which is now in remission. Kill has since started the Coach Kill Fund to assist low-income southern Illinois residents with treatment. Then, from 2010 through 2013, Kill was plagued by a series of gameday hospitalizations, most of which were also seizures. Shortly after a game in September 2010, he was hospitalized for dehydration. He then suffered two gameday seizures during the 2011 season, followed by one each in 2012 and 2013. After the 2013 seizure, Kill announced that he was taking a leave of absence to address his health and get his seizures under control. After coaching for the entire 2014 season and the first seven games of the 2015 season, Kill announced that he was resigning as head coach on October 28, 2015. He cited health reasons, including at least two additional seizures, as the cause for his decision.

Kill was a nominee for the 2011 Uplifting Athletes Rare Disease Champion Award, presented by Uplifting Athletes, but lost to Princeton running back Jordan Culbreath. In 2016, he was named to the Kansas Sports Hall of Fame.

== Head coaching record ==
Year	Team	Overall	Conference	Standing	Bowl/playoffs	TSN^{#}
Saginaw Valley State Cardinals (Midwest Intercollegiate Football Conference) (1994–1998)
1994	Saginaw Valley State	6–4	6–4	T–4th		
1995	Saginaw Valley State	7–3	7–3	T–3rd		
1996	Saginaw Valley State	7–3	7–3	T–3rd		
1997	Saginaw Valley State	9–2	8–2	3rd		
1998	Saginaw Valley State	9–2	8–2	T–2nd		
Saginaw Valley State:		38–14	36–14			
Emporia State Hornets (Mid-America Intercollegiate Athletics Association) (1999–2000)
1999	Emporia State	5–6	4–5	T–5th		
2000	Emporia State	6–5	5–4	T–4th		
Emporia State:		11–11	9–9			
Southern Illinois Salukis (Gateway Football Conference) (2001–2007)
2001	Southern Illinois	1–10	1–6	7th		
2002	Southern Illinois	4–8	2–5	T–6th		
2003	Southern Illinois	10–2	6–1	T–1st	L NCAA Division I-AA First Round	9
2004	Southern Illinois	10–2	7–0	1st	L NCAA Division I-AA First Round	9
2005	Southern Illinois	9–4	5–2	T–1st	L NCAA Division I-AA Second Round	7
2006	Southern Illinois	9–4	4–3	T–4th	L NCAA Division I Second Round	7
2007	Southern Illinois	12–2	5–1	2nd	L NCAA Division I Semifinal	3
Southern Illinois:		55–32	30–18			
Northern Illinois Huskies (Mid-American Conference) (2008–2010)
2008	Northern Illinois	6–7	5–3	4th (West)	L Independence	
2009	Northern Illinois	7–6	5–3	2nd (West)	L International	
2010	Northern Illinois	10–3	8–0	1st (West)	Humanitarian (Note: Did not coach bowl game)	
Northern Illinois:		23–16	18–6			
Minnesota Golden Gophers (Big Ten Conference) (2011–2015)
2011	Minnesota	3–9	2–6	6th (Legends)		
2012	Minnesota	6–7	2–6	T–5th (Legends)	L Texas	
2013	Minnesota	8–5 (Note: Took a two-game leave of absence for epilepsy treatment during the 2013 season, but all games are credited to his record.)	4–4	4th (Legends)	L Texas	
2014	Minnesota	8–5	5–3	T–2nd (West)	L Citrus	
2015	Minnesota	4–3 (Note: Resigned due to health)	1–2	T–4th (West)		
Minnesota:		29–29	14–21			
TCU Horned Frogs (Big 12 Conference) (2021)
2021	TCU	2–2 (Note: Kill took over as interim coach after eight games)	2–2	T–7th		
TCU:		2–2	2–2			
New Mexico State Aggies (Division I FBS Independent) (2022)
2022	New Mexico State	7–6			W Quick Lane	
New Mexico State Aggies (Conference USA) (2023)
2023	New Mexico State	10–5	7–1	2nd	L New Mexico	
New Mexico State:		17–11	7–1			
Total:		175–115				
National championship Conference title Conference division title or championship game berth
