= Midwest Intercollegiate Football Conference =

American football NCAA Division II conference from 1990 to 1999

- Association: NCAA
- Founded: February 1989
- Folded: July 1, 1999
- Sports fielded: 1 (football)
- Division: Division II
- No. of teams: 11 (original), 14 (final)
- Region: Great Lakes Region

The Midwest Intercollegiate Football Conference (MIFC) was a football-only NCAA Division II conference active for nine seasons in the 1990s. The creation of the MIFC was announced in February 1989. The conference play began in September 1990.

The conference was formed by a merger of the football-only Heartland Collegiate Conference and the football playing members of the Great Lakes Intercollegiate Athletic Conference (GLIAC), which dropped football as a conference sport after the 1989 season. The membership of the MIFC was somewhat unstable. The league started with 11 teams and finished with 14, but just 8 members played all nine seasons. Seventeen different institutions were members of the MIFC at one time or another.

== History ==
The founding MIFC members from the Heartland Conference were Saint Joseph's College, Ashland University, Valparaiso University, the University of Indianapolis and Butler University. The founding members from the GLIAC were Ferris State University, Grand Valley State University, Hillsdale College, Northern Michigan University, Saginaw Valley State University and Wayne State University.

Membership changes came quickly and often to the MIFC. Butler and Valparaiso left after the 1992 season, when the NCAA stopped allowing Division I schools to play football at the Division II or III level. They were replaced by Northwood University and the University of St. Francis for the 1993 season. The next change came in the 1994 season when Michigan Technological University joined the conference as its 12th member. The MIFC reverted to an 11-team lineup after the 1995 season, when St. Joseph's left the league. The final change occurred in 1998 when the University of Findlay, Mercyhurst College, and Westminster College all joined the conference, increasing the membership to 14. Through all of these changes, the MIFC maintained a 10-game conference schedule.

The MIFC experienced extremes of parity and single-team domination. After four schools tied for the 1992 conference championship, Ferris State won four consecutive titles from 1993 to 1996, three of them in undefeated seasons. Ferris State was the most successful MIFC team overall, winning or sharing five championships. Grand Valley State was second with four titles, followed by Butler (two), Ashland (one), and Hillsdale (one). An MIFC team qualified for the NCAA Division II Football Championship playoffs every season, and a second team qualified in two seasons. MIFC teams, collectively, had a 5–11 record in the playoffs.

MIFC players who went on to the NFL include running backs Eric Lynch (Grand Valley State) and Tom Beer (Saginaw Valley State, Wayne State); linebackers Mark Maddox (Northern Michigan) and Monty Brown (Ferris State); offensive lineman Mike Sheldon (Grand Valley State); and defensive linemen Paul Spicer (Saginaw Valley State) and Lamar King (Saginaw Valley State). King was a first-round draft pick (#22 overall) in 1999.

In the MIFC's last three seasons, Indianapolis and St. Francis were the only members that were not also members of the GLIAC. After St. Francis left the conference following the 1998 season, the GLIAC voted to resume sponsorship of football as a conference sport, accommodating Indianapolis as a football-only associate member. This "merger" of the MIFC into the GLIAC was announced in June 1999.

The GLIAC now treats the MIFC records of 1990–98 as part of its own football history.

== Champions and playoff appearances ==
Season	Champion(s)	MIFC record	Division II playoffs
1990	Grand Valley State	9-1	lost to Texas A&M Commerce, 20–14
1991	Butler	9-1	lost to Pittsburg State, 26–16
1992	Ferris State (co-champion)	8-2	beat Edinboro, 19–15; lost to New Haven, 35–13
	Butler (co-champion)	8-2	
	Hillsdale (co-champion)	8-2	
	Grand Valley State (co-champion)	8-2	
1993	Ferris State	8-0-2	lost to Indiana (PA), 28–21
1994	Ferris State	10-0	beat West Chester, 43–40; lost to Indiana (PA), 21–17
1995	Ferris State	10-0	beat Millersville, 36–26; beat New Haven, 17–9; lost to North Alabama, 45–7.
1996	Ferris State	9-1	beat Indiana (PA), 24–23; lost to Clarion, 23–21
1997	Ashland (co-champion)	9-1	lost to Slippery Rock, 30–20
	Grand Valley State (co-champion)	9-1	
1998	Grand Valley State	9-1	lost to Slippery Rock, 37–14

Second-place teams qualifying for the playoffs:

1991: Grand Valley State lost to Texas A&M Commerce, 36–15

1994: Grand Valley State lost to Indiana (PA), 35–27

== Yearly standings ==
1990 Midwest Intercollegiate Football Conference standings
	Conf.					Overall
Team	W		L		T	W		L		T
No. 6 Grand Valley State $^	9	–	1	–	0	10	–	2	–	0
No. T–20 Ashland	7	–	3	–	0	7	–	3	–	1
Hillsdale	7	–	3	–	0	7	–	4	–	0
Ferris State	5	–	4	–	1	6	–	4	–	1
Butler	5	–	4	–	1	5	–	5	–	1
Northern Michigan	5	–	4	–	1	5	–	5	–	1
Saginaw Valley State	5	–	5	–	0	6	–	5	–	0
Indianapolis	3	–	6	–	1	3	–	6	–	1
Wayne State (MI)	3	–	7	–	0	3	–	7	–	0
Saint Joseph's (IN)	3	–	7	–	0	3	–	7	–	0
Valparaiso	1	–	9	–	0	1	–	9	–	0
$ – Conference champion; ^ – NCAA Division II playoff participant; Rankings from NCAA Division II Football Committee poll

1991 Midwest Intercollegiate Football Conference standings
	Conf.					Overall
Team	W		L		T	W		L		T
No. 5 Butler $^	9	–	1	–	0	9	–	2	–	0
No. 15 Ashland	8	–	2	–	0	9	–	2	–	0
No. 9 Grand Valley State ^	8	–	2	–	0	9	–	3	–	0
Saginaw Valley State	5	–	5	–	0	6	–	5	–	0
Ferris State	5	–	5	–	0	5	–	6	–	0
Hillsdale	5	–	5	–	0	5	–	6	–	0
Wayne State (MI)	4	–	6	–	0	4	–	6	–	0
Saint Joseph's (IN)	4	–	6	–	0	4	–	6	–	0
Northern Michigan	3	–	6	–	1	3	–	6	–	1
Indianapolis	2	–	8	–	0	2	–	8	–	0
Valparaiso	1	–	8	–	1	1	–	8	–	1
$ – Conference champion; ^ – NCAA Division II playoff participant; Rankings from NCAA Division II Football Committee poll

1992 Midwest Intercollegiate Football Conference standings
	Conf.					Overall
Team	W		L		T	W		L		T
Hillsdale +	8	–	2	–	0	9	–	2	–	0
Ferris State +^	8	–	2	–	0	10	–	3	–	0
Butler +	8	–	2	–	0	8	–	2	–	0
Grand Valley State +	8	–	2	–	0	8	–	3	–	0
Ashland	7	–	3	–	0	8	–	3	–	0
Saginaw Valley State	6	–	4	–	0	7	–	4	–	0
Wayne State (MI)	3	–	7	–	0	4	–	7	–	0
Valparaiso	3	–	7	–	0	3	–	8	–	0
Indianapolis	1	–	8	–	1	1	–	8	–	1
Saint Joseph's (IN)	1	–	8	–	1	1	–	8	–	1
Northern Michigan	1	–	9	–	0	1	–	9	–	0
+ – Conference co-champions; ^ – NCAA Division II playoff participant

1993 Midwest Intercollegiate Football Conference standings
	Conf.					Overall
Team	W		L		T	W		L		T
No. 10 Ferris State $^	8	–	0	–	2	9	–	1	–	2
No. 15 Ashland	8	–	2	–	0	9	–	2	–	0
Grand Valley State	6	–	2	–	2	6	–	3	–	2
Hillsdale	6	–	3	–	1	7	–	3	–	1
Northern Michigan	5	–	4	–	1	5	–	4	–	1
Wayne State (MI)	5	–	5	–	0	6	–	5	–	0
St. Francis (IL)	5	–	5	–	0	5	–	6	–	0
Saginaw Valley State	4	–	6	–	0	4	–	7	–	0
Northwood	2	–	7	–	1	3	–	7	–	1
Saint Joseph's (IN)	1	–	8	–	1	1	–	8	–	1
Indianapolis	1	–	9	–	0	2	–	9	–	0
$ – Conference champion; ^ – NCAA Division II playoff participant; Rankings from NCAA Division II Football Committee poll

1994 Midwest Intercollegiate Football Conference standings
	Conf.					Overall
Team	W		L		T	W		L		T
No. 5 Ferris State $^	10	–	0	–	0	11	–	1	–	0
No. 18 Grand Valley State ^	8	–	2	–	0	8	–	4	–	0
Hillsdale	7	–	3	–	0	7	–	4	–	0
Ashland	6	–	4	–	0	6	–	4	–	0
Saginaw Valley State	6	–	4	–	0	6	–	4	–	0
Wayne State (MI)	6	–	4	–	0	6	–	5	–	0
Northern Michigan	5	–	5	–	0	5	–	5	–	0
Michigan Tech	3	–	7	–	0	4	–	7	–	0
Saint Joseph's (IN)	3	–	7	–	0	4	–	7	–	0
Indianapolis	2	–	7	–	1	2	–	7	–	1
Northwood	2	–	7	–	1	2	–	7	–	1
St. Francis (IL)	1	–	9	–	0	1	–	10	–	0
$ – Conference champion; ^ – NCAA Division II playoff participant; Rankings from NCAA Division II Football Committee poll

1995 Midwest Intercollegiate Football Conference standings
	Conf.					Overall
Team	W		L		T	W		L		T
No. 3 Ferris State $^	10	–	0	–	0	12	–	1	–	0
Grand Valley State	8	–	2	–	0	8	–	3	–	0
Northern Michigan	7	–	3	–	0	7	–	3	–	0
Saginaw Valley State	7	–	3	–	0	7	–	3	–	0
Hillsdale	7	–	3	–	0	7	–	4	–	0
Michigan Tech	5	–	5	–	0	5	–	5	–	0
St. Francis (IL)	5	–	5	–	0	5	–	6	–	0
Indianapolis	3	–	7	–	0	3	–	8	–	0
Wayne State (MI)	3	–	7	–	0	3	–	8	–	0
Ashland	2	–	8	–	0	2	–	8	–	0
Northwood	2	–	8	–	0	2	–	8	–	0
Saint Joseph's (IN)	1	–	9	–	0	1	–	9	–	0
$ – Conference champion; ^ – NCAA Division II playoff participant; Rankings from NCAA Division II Football Committee poll

1996 Midwest Intercollegiate Football Conference standings
	Conf.			Overall
Team	W		L	W		L
No. 3 Ferris State $^	9	–	1	10	–	2
Grand Valley State	8	–	2	8	–	3
Northern Michigan	7	–	3	7	–	3
No. 20 Saginaw Valley State	7	–	3	7	–	3
Hillsdale	6	–	4	6	–	5
Northwood	5	–	5	6	–	5
Ashland	4	–	6	4	–	7
Indianapolis	3	–	7	4	–	7
St. Francis (IL)	2	–	8	3	–	8
Michigan Tech	2	–	8	2	–	8
Wayne State (MI)	2	–	8	2	–	9
$ – Conference champion; ^ – NCAA Division II playoff participant; Rankings from NCAA Division II Football Committee poll

1997 Midwest Intercollegiate Football Conference standings
	Conf.			Overall
Team	W		L	W		L
No. 12 Ashland +^	9	–	1	9	–	2
Grand Valley State +	9	–	1	9	–	1
Saginaw Valley State	8	–	2	9	–	2
Indianapolis	7	–	3	8	–	3
Northern Michigan	6	–	4	7	–	4
Hillsdale	4	–	6	4	–	7
Ferris State	3	–	7	3	–	7
Northwood	3	–	7	3	–	7
Wayne State (MI)	3	–	7	3	–	8
Michigan Tech	2	–	8	2	–	8
St. Francis (IL)	1	–	9	1	–	9
+ – Conference co-champions; ^ – NCAA Division II playoff participant; Rankings from NCAA Division II Football Committee poll

1998 Midwest Intercollegiate Football Conference standings
	Conf.			Overall
Team	W		L	W		L
No. 14 Grand Valley State $^	9	–	1	9	–	3
Saginaw Valley State	8	–	2	9	–	2
Indianapolis	8	–	2	8	–	2
Ashland	7	–	3	7	–	3
Northwood	7	–	3	7	–	3
Findlay	5	–	5	5	–	5
Mercyhurst	5	–	5	5	–	5
Ferris State	5	–	5	5	–	6
Northern Michigan	4	–	5	5	–	5
Michigan Tech	4	–	6	4	–	6
Hillsdale	3	–	7	3	–	8
Westminster (PA)	2	–	7	3	–	7
Wayne State (MI)	2	–	8	2	–	9
St. Francis (IL)	0	–	10	0	–	11
$ – Conference champion; ^ – NCAA Division II playoff participant; Rankings from NCAA Division II Football Committee poll
