= John Sokolosky =

American football player (1956–2013)

No. 53
- Position: Center

Personal information
- Born: April 2, 1956; Detroit, Michigan
- Died: October 17, 2013 (aged 57); Sterling Heights, Michigan
- Listed height: 6 ft 2 in (1.88 m)
- Listed weight: 240 lb (109 kg)

Career information
- High school: De La Salle (MI)
- College: Wayne State
- NFL draft: 1978: undrafted

Career history
- Detroit Lions (1978)
- Stats at Pro Football Reference

John Sokolosky (April 2, 1956 – October 17, 2013) was an American football center. He played for the Detroit Lions in 1978.

He died on October 17, 2013, in Sterling Heights, Michigan at age 57.
