= Battle of the Valleys =

American college football rivalry

- Grand Valley State Lakers Saginaw Valley State Cardinals
- Sport: Football
- First meeting: October 18, 1975; Grand Valley, 32–5
- Latest meeting: October 24, 2026; Saginaw Valley, 27–20
- Trophy: None (for game), Victoria (for fundraising)

Statistics
- Total meetings: 55 (including 4 NCAA playoff meetings)
- All-time series: Grand Valley leads, 42–13 (including 4–0 in NCAA playoff meetings)
- Largest victory: Grand Valley, 55–7 (1982)
- Longest win streak: Grand Valley, 12 (2013–2024)
- Current win streak: Saginaw Valley, 2 (2025–present)

Locations in Michigan

The Battle of the Valleys is an NCAA Division II football rivalry between the Grand Valley State University Lakers and the Saginaw Valley State University Cardinals which began in 1975. Both teams play in the GLIAC. Since 2003, the week leading up to the game has featured a fundraising competition between the two student bodies with proceeds being donated to local charities. Grand Valley and Saginaw Valley have met four times in the NCAA Division II football playoffs. While not considered part of the rivalry series, both teams count these games in the all-time head-to-head records and are included below.

== Fundraising Battle ==
Adding to the football rivalry which has existed since 1975, in 2003 an additional element was added to the Battle of the Valleys rivalry in the form of a fundraising competition between the two student bodies. Grand Valley won the initial fundraising battle, raising $8,500 for the Big Brothers Big Sisters of Western Michigan with Saginaw Valley raising $6,208 for the BBBS of Mid-Michigan. While Grand Valley leads the rivalry on the football field, Saginaw Valley leads in the fundraising rivalry 8–3. A traveling trophy, Victoria, accompanies the fundraising competition and the winner of the fundraising competition, announced during the football game, has possession of the trophy until the next Battle. The largest margin of victory was in 2012 when Saginaw Valley raised over $30,000 for the Great Lakes Miracle League versus Grand Valley's $1,100 for the Mental Health Foundation of West Michigan, and the closest margin of victory was in 2006 when Grand Valley raised $19,337 for Burton Middle School and Saginaw Valley raised $19,160 for Child and Family Services of Saginaw County. Saginaw Valley is currently on a seven-year winning streak in the fundraising battle. All told, over $400,000 has been raised in the history of the Battle by both schools combined. The winner of the fundraising battle has also won the football game on four occasions: 2004, 2006, 2007, and 2012.

== Game results ==
| Grand Valley State victories | Saginaw Valley State victories |

| No. | Date | Location | Winner | Score |
|---|---|---|---|---|
| 1 | 1975 | Allendale, MI | Grand Valley State | 32–5 |
| 2 | 1976 | University Center, MI | Grand Valley State | 17–6 |
| 3 | 1977 | Allendale, MI | Grand Valley State | 41–14 |
| 4 | 1978 | University Center, MI | Grand Valley State | 24–14 |
| 5 | 1979 | University Center, MI | Saginaw Valley State | 32–24 |
| 6 | 1980 | Allendale, MI | Grand Valley State | 45–20 |
| 7 | 1981 | University Center, MI | Grand Valley State | 31–7 |
| 8 | 1982 | Allendale, MI | Grand Valley State | 55–7 |
| 9 | 1983 | University Center, MI | Saginaw Valley State | 15–14 |
| 10 | 1984 | Allendale, MI | Saginaw Valley State | 28–24 |
| 11 | 1985 | University Center, MI | Saginaw Valley State | 35–18 |
| 12 | 1986 | Allendale, MI | Grand Valley State | 28–13 |
| 13 | 1987 | University Center, MI | Grand Valley State | 31–28 |
| 14 | 1988 | Allendale, MI | Grand Valley State | 14–13 |
| 15 | 1989 | University Center, MI | Grand Valley State | 42–17 |
| 16 | 1990 | Allendale, MI | Grand Valley State | 23–7 |
| 17 | 1991 | University Center, MI | Saginaw Valley State | 14–10 |
| 18 | 1992 | Allendale, MI | Grand Valley State | 24–20 |
| 19 | 1993 | University Center, MI | Grand Valley State | 36–17 |
| 20 | 1994 | Allendale, MI | Grand Valley State | 27–22 |
| 21 | 1995 | Allendale, MI | Saginaw Valley State | 24–21 |
| 22 | 1996 | Allendale, MI | Grand Valley State | 17–6 |
| 23 | 1997 | University Center, MI | Saginaw Valley State | 30–27 |
| 24 | 1998 | University Center, MI | Grand Valley State | 37–36 |
| 25 | 1999 | Allendale, MI | Grand Valley State | 31–7 |
| 26 | 2000 | University Center, MI | Saginaw Valley State | 28–21 |
| 27 | 2001 | Allendale, MI | Grand Valley State | 38–7 |
| 28 | 2001* | Allendale, MI | Grand Valley State | 33–30 |

| No. | Date | Location | Winner | Score |
|---|---|---|---|---|
| 29 | 2002 | University Center, MI | Grand Valley State | 23–18 |
| 30 | 2003 | Allendale, MI | Saginaw Valley State | 34–20 |
| 31 | 2003* | University Center, MI | Grand Valley State | 10–3 |
| 32 | 2004 | University Center, MI | Saginaw Valley State | 31–20 |
| 33 | 2005 | Allendale, MI | Grand Valley State | 31–10 |
| 34 | 2005* | Allendale, MI | Grand Valley State | 24–17 |
| 35 | 2006 | Allendale, MI | Grand Valley State | 49–35 |
| 36 | 2007 | University Center, MI | Grand Valley State | 21–10 |
| 37 | 2008 | University Center, MI | Grand Valley State | 36–0 |
| 38 | 2009 | Allendale, MI | Grand Valley State | 38–7 |
| 39 | 2010 | University Center, MI | Grand Valley State | 28–7 |
| 40 | 2011 | Allendale, MI | Grand Valley State | 49–24 |
| 41 | 2012 | University Center, MI | Saginaw Valley State | 55–52 |
| 42 | 2013 | Allendale, MI | Grand Valley State | 49–34 |
| 43 | 2013* | Allendale, MI | Grand Valley State | 40–7 |
| 44 | 2014 | University Center, MI | Grand Valley State | 21–3 |
| 45 | 2015 | Allendale, MI | Grand Valley State | 24–17 |
| 46 | 2016 | University Center, MI | Grand Valley State | 62–56 |
| 47 | 2017 | Allendale, MI | Grand Valley State | 34–6 |
| 48 | 2018 | University Center, MI | Grand Valley State | 31–28 |
| 49 | 2019 | Allendale, MI | Grand Valley State | 35–28 |
| 50 | 2021 | University Center, MI | Grand Valley State | 49–17 |
| 51 | 2022 | Allendale, MI | Grand Valley State | 29–10 |
| 52 | 2023 | University Center, MI | Grand Valley State | 55–14 |
| 53 | 2024 | University Center, MI | Grand Valley State | 16–9 |
| 54 | 2025 | Allendale, MI | Saginaw Valley State | 20–19 |
| 55 | 2026 | University Center, MI | Saginaw Valley State | 27–20 |
Series: Grand Valley State leads 42–13

== Fundraising results ==
| No. | Date | Location | Grand Valley | | Saginaw Valley | |
|---|---|---|---|---|---|---|
| 1 | 2003 | Allendale, MI | Grand Valley | $8,500 | Saginaw Valley | $6,208 |
| 2 | 2004 | University Center, MI | Grand Valley | $7,500 | Saginaw Valley | $12,000 |
| 3 | 2005 | Allendale, MI | Grand Valley | $7,327 | Saginaw Valley | $13,012 |
| 4 | 2006 | Allendale, MI | Grand Valley | $19,337 | Saginaw Valley | $19,160 |
| 5 | 2007 | University Center, MI | Grand Valley | $31,382 | Saginaw Valley | $20,319 |
| 6 | 2008 | University Center, MI | Grand Valley | $28,002 | Saginaw Valley | $47,278 |
| 7 | 2009 | Allendale, MI | Grand Valley | $19,299 | Saginaw Valley | $34,401 |
| 8 | 2010 | University Center, MI | Grand Valley | $12,500 | Saginaw Valley | $40,088 |
| 9 | 2011 | Allendale, MI | Grand Valley | $12,381 | Saginaw Valley | $26,623 |
| 10 | 2012 | University Center, MI | Grand Valley | $1,100 | Saginaw Valley | $30,224 |
| 11 | 2013 | Allendale, MI | Grand Valley | $11,137 | Saginaw Valley | $25,185 |
| 12 | 2014 | University Center, MI | Grand Valley | $7,000 | Saginaw Valley | $32,294 |
| 13 | 2015 | Allendale, MI | Grand Valley | $12,031 | Saginaw Valley | $24,540 |
| 14 | 2016 | University Center, MI | Grand Valley | $17,000 | Saginaw Valley | $26,000 |
| 15 | 2017 | Allendale, MI | Grand Valley | $17,000 | Saginaw Valley | $32,000 |
| 16 | 2018 | University Center, MI | Grand Valley | $14,915 | Saginaw Valley | $36,210 |
Series: Saginaw Valley leads 13–3

== See also ==
- List of NCAA college football rivalry games
