= Lubbers Stadium =

College stadium in Allendale, Michigan, USA

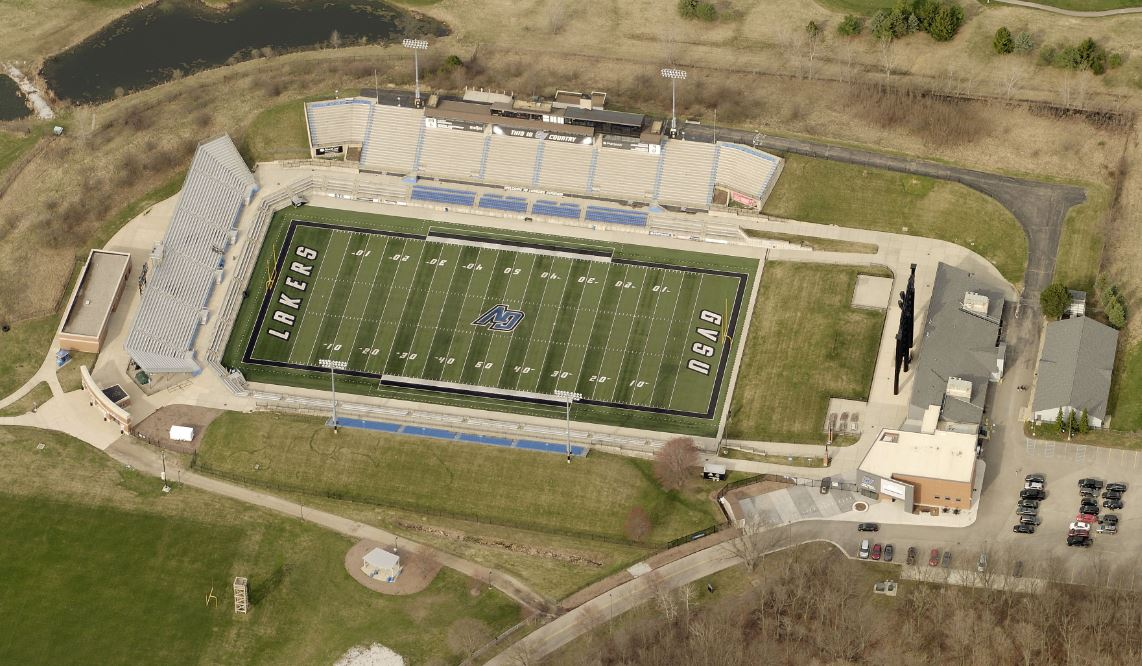
- Interactive map of Lubbers Stadium
- Full name: Arend D. Lubbers Stadium
- Former names: Lakers Stadium (1973–1979)
- Address: 4415 Stadium Drive, Allendale, MI 49401
- Location: GVSU Main Campus
- Coordinates: 42°58′9.4″N 85°53′39.5″W
- Owner: Grand Valley State University
- Operator: Grand Valley State University
- Capacity: 10,444 (2012-present); 8,950 (2011); 8,550 (1979-2010)
- Surface: FieldTurf (2012-present); Kentucky Bluegrass (1973-2011)
- Scoreboard: Daktronics with ProStar video display board
- Record attendance: 17,007 (2021)

Construction
- Opened: September 15, 1973
- Expanded: 1998, 2008, 2011, 2012

Tenants
- Grand Valley State Lakers football (NCAA) (1973-present); Michigan Panthers (UFL) (2027-Present)

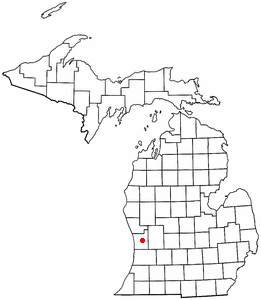
Location of Allendale, MI, home of Lubbers Stadium

Lubbers Stadium, or Arend D. Lubbers Stadium, is a stadium on the Grand Valley State University's main campus in Allendale, Michigan, USA. The stadium was named after former university president Arend Lubbers. It is primarily used for American football, and is the home field of the Grand Valley State Lakers. "Lakers Stadium" - as it was originally known - was constructed in 1972, and opened in 1973. It now officially seats 10,444 people - though it almost always holds thousands more fans. The stadium is also home to a football offices and weight training facility.

== History ==
"Lakers Stadium" - as it was originally known - hosted its first football game on September 15, 1973 against Kalamazoo College. The Lakers won their first ever home game by defeating the Hornets 27–14. The stadium was officially dedicated and formally named "Arend D. Lubbers Stadium" on September 15, 1979.

== Location ==
Lubbers Stadium is located in the northwest part of campus along with most all other athletics facilities, just north of the Kelly Family Sports Center and just south of Lake Michigan Drive.

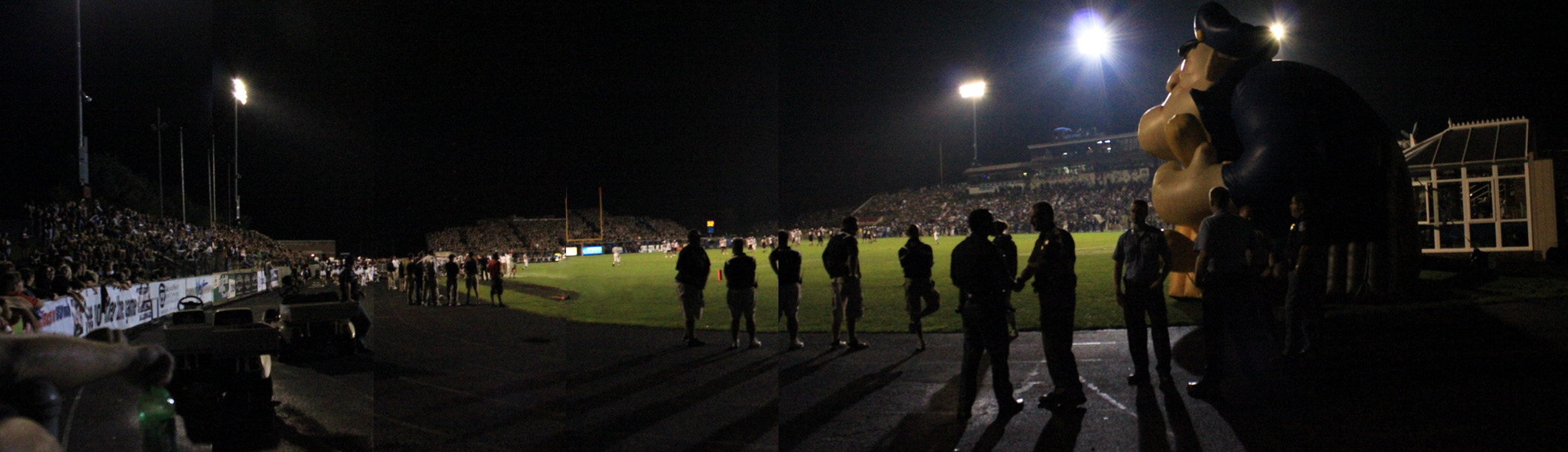

== Expansions ==
Beginning in the spring of 2011, Lubbers Stadium began undergoing a series of expansions and renovations that will increase capacity, concessions, and restroom facilities. The improvements are being paid for by several large private gifts.

=== 2011 ===
The first year of expansion included replacing the student seating section with new stands, increasing student seating by 400 seats and wrapping around the corners of the stadium creating a horseshoe. Permanent concession stands and restrooms behind student section were also built to accommodate the increase in seating and the fans sitting in the south end. The wooden benches in the east and west grandstands were wrapped in blue acrylic plastic to provide more comfortable seating and a longer lifespan.

=== 2012 ===
In second year of renovations the field was lowered by eight feet and the outdoor track surface was removed and replaced by the new track and lacrosse stadium that was constructed on the south side of campus. Lowering the field gave the opportunity to add four rows of seating down toward the field in a horseshoe configuration, adding 2,000 seats. Chair-back seats were added in four of the new sections behind the home sideline. A grass slope was built behind the north end zone and in front of the video board for overflow seating and the band section was moved to the southeast corner. The field was then replaced with an artificial turf playing surface.

=== 2016 ===
The existing video board in the stadium was replaced. The new board is 40 feet tall and 72.5 feet wide, a total display area of 2,900 square ft. making the new board nine times larger than the old one. It is the largest board in Division II and would rank second among all FCS schools, it is the fourth largest in the state of Michigan and the 40th largest on-campus display board in the country. In addition an 18 x 8 scoreboard was added to the south side of the stadium.

=== 2017 ===
Expansion occurred during the summer months of 2017 on the press box, located on the west side of the stadium. The addition was on the upper north section of press box, adding another few boxes. The project was completed in late August, in time for the upcoming season.

=== 2019 ===
Between the 2018 and 2019 seasons the building containing the football offices and locker room at the north end of the stadium was renovated and expanded. The building was renamed the Jamie Hosford Football Center and includes: New team meeting room, expanded and renovated locker room and equipment room, new and renovated player meeting rooms, new coaches offices, new athletic training facility and new lobby and trophy area.

=== Beyond ===
Designed with the future in mind, the stadium can have permanent seating added when needed, with ultimate expansion to 20,000 seats. In the years beyond this expansion the University plans on adding visiting locker rooms under the east grandstand and remove the existing press box and replace it with a larger one to add more seating and sky boxes. These improvements would be paid for by a public fund raising campaign.

== Attendance records ==
Highest Attendance at Lubbers Stadium
Rank	Attendance	Year	Game result
1	17,007	2021	Grand Valley 28, Ferris State 35
2	16,889	2016	Grand Valley 35, Ferris State 23
3	16,734	2017	Grand Valley 48, Davenport 0
4	16,671	2018	Grand Valley 45, Michigan Tech 20
5	16,624	2022	Grand Valley 66, Lincoln (Calif.) 7
6	16,563	2018	Grand Valley 31, Ferris State 35
7	16,467	2009	Grand Valley 38, Saginaw Valley 7
8	16,236	2016	Grand Valley 50, Northern Michigan 24
9	16,121	2015	Grand Valley 24, Ferris State 61
10	15,985	2017	Grand Valley 34, Saginaw Valley 6
11	15,254	2021	Grand Valley 70, Northwood 9
12	15,139	2012	Grand Valley 83, Notre Dame (Ohio) 46
13	15,005	2014	Grand Valley 24, Ohio Dominican 28
14	15,004	2011	Grand Valley 44, Western Oregon 20
15	14,688	2016	Grand Valley 55, Lake Erie 7
16	14,612	2008	Grand Valley 31, Ferris State 13
17	14,557	2005	Grand Valley 30, Ferris State 10
18	14,552	2019	Grand Valley 35, Edinboro (PA) 10
19	14,515	2014	Grand Valley 66, Lake Erie 28
20	14,472	2005	Grand Valley 31, Saginaw Valley 10

== Stadium traditions ==
- "Cannons" – After every touchdown or field goal score by GVSU, "cannons" or fireworks are shot off behind the student section on the south end of the stadium. Cannons are then fired after the game if GVSU has won.
- "Grass slopes" – Grass slopes have existed in Lubbers Stadium since its initial construction. Through various expansions and renovations, the athletic department has made it a priority to preserve a grass slope in the stadium.
- "Lubbers Leap" - When the team enters the field from the north ramp prior to kickoff they run across the field and leap into the student section in the south endzone.
