= Northwood Timberwolves =

Athletic team of Northwood University in Michigan

- University: Northwood University
- NCAA: Division II
- Conference: G-MAC (primary)
- Athletic director: Jeff Curtis
- Location: Midland, Michigan
- Varsity teams: 18 (9 men's, 9 women's)
- Football stadium: Hantz Stadium
- Basketball arena: Riepma Arena
- Baseball stadium: Gerace Baseball Stadium
- Softball stadium: Fisher Softball Stadium
- Soccer stadium: Dean Soccer Field
- Other venues: Bennett Sports Center
- Nickname: Timberwolves
- Colors
- Mascot: Woody
- Website: www.gonorthwood.com
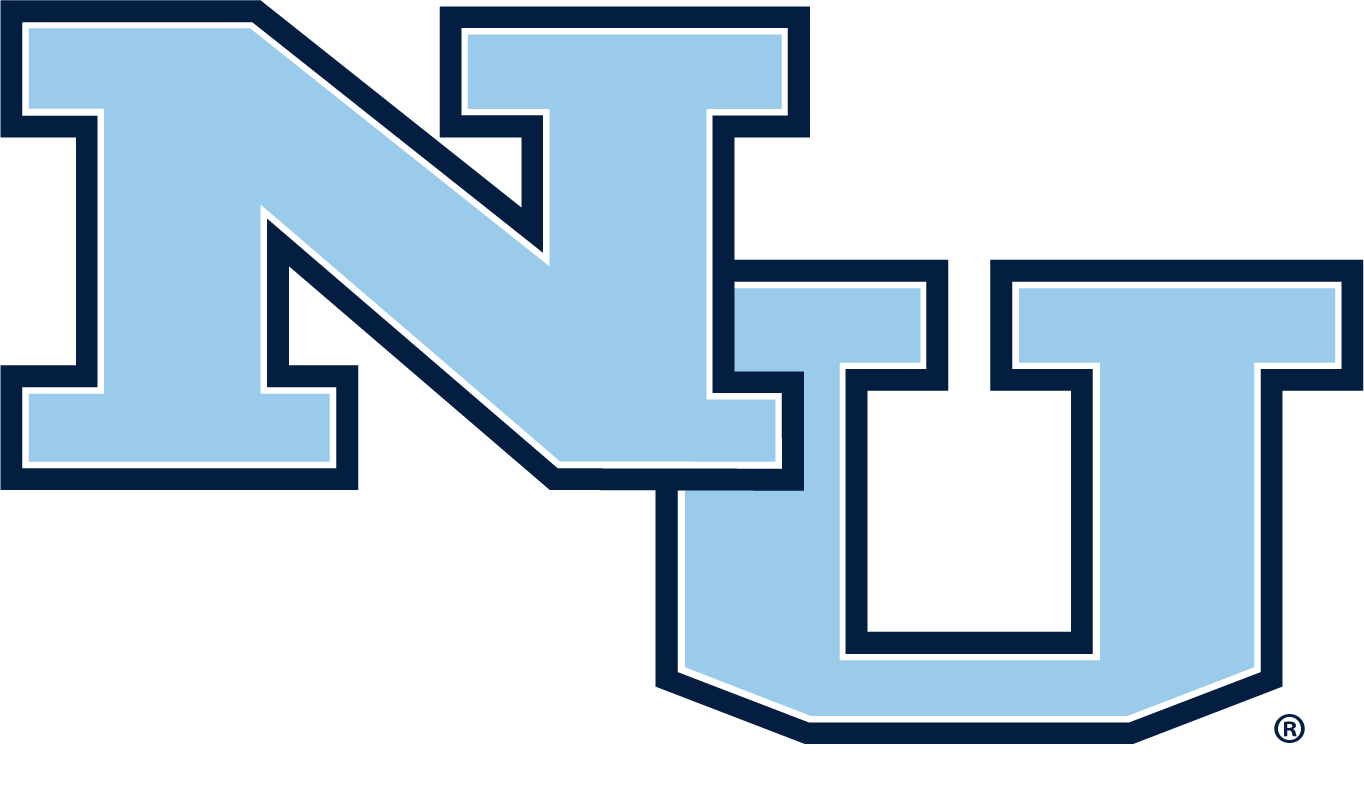

The Northwood Timberwolves are the athletic teams that represent Northwood University, located in Midland, in intercollegiate sports. Northwood competes at the NCAA Division II level and has been a member of the Great Midwest Athletic Conference (G-MAC) since the 2022–23 academic year.

The Timberwolves previously competed in the Great Lakes Intercollegiate Athletic Conference (GLIAC) from 1972–73 to 1986–87 and again from 1992–93 to 2021–22. On April 29, 2021, Northwood announced its decision to depart the GLIAC and join the G-MAC, with the transition officially taking effect in July 2022.

Northwood sponsors a broad range of varsity sports, including football, basketball, soccer, tennis, golf, lacrosse, and track & field for both men and women, along with volleyball and softball on the women’s side and baseball on the men’s side. The Timberwolves’ primary athletic facilities are located on campus in Midland, with football and outdoor track & field competing at Hantz Stadium and basketball and volleyball held at Bennett Sports Center.

In addition to its NCAA Division II programs, Northwood also sponsors select club sports that compete at the national level through organizations such as the American Collegiate Hockey Association (ACHA). The university’s teams compete under the Timberwolves nickname, with school colors of navy and light blue.

== NCAA Division II teams ==
Northwood competes in 18 varsity sports:

| Men's sports | Women's sports |
|---|---|
| Baseball | Basketball |
| Basketball | Cross Country |
| Cross Country | Golf |
| Football | Lacrosse |
| Golf | Soccer |
| Lacrosse | Softball |
| Soccer | Tennis |
| Tennis | Track and field |
| Track and field | Volleyball |

== ACHA DI and DIII Ice Hockey teams ==
Northwood University men's ice hockey competes in the American Collegiate Hockey Association (ACHA) at both the Division I and Division III levels. The Timberwolves compete in the Great Lakes Collegiate Hockey League (GLCHL) for Division I and is a member of the Michigan Collegiate Hockey Conference (MCHC) for Division III.

== Facilities ==
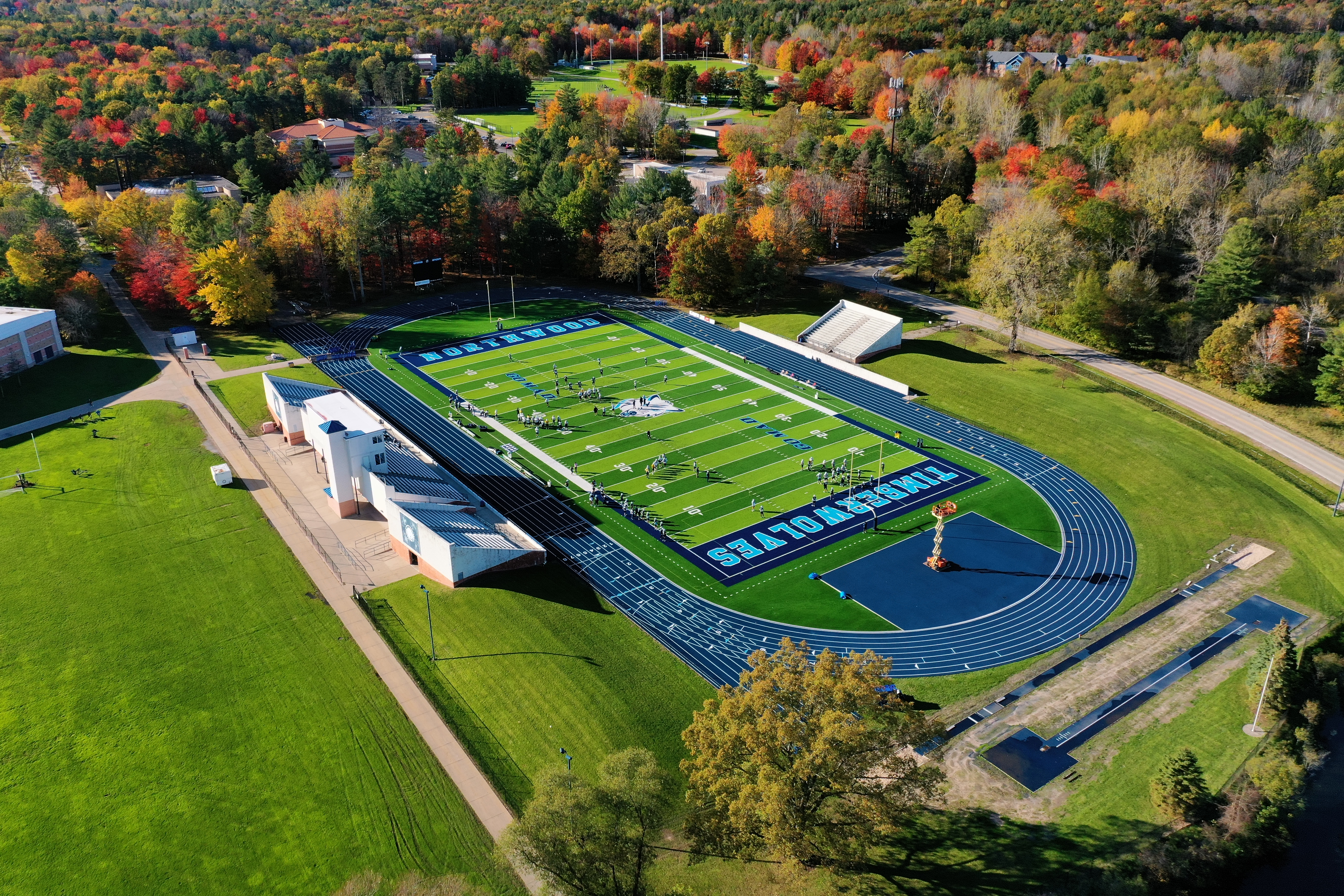
Hantz Stadium

| Venue | Sport(s) | Ref. |
|---|---|---|
| Hantz Stadium | Football; Track and field | |
| Riepma Arena | Basketball; Volleyball | |
| Gerace Stadium | Baseball | |
| Fisher Stadium | Softball | |
| Dean Field | Soccer | |
| Colestock Courts | Tennis | |
