= Wayne State Warriors football =

Football program representing Wayne State University

- First season: 1918; 108 years ago
- Athletic director: Erika Wallace
- Head coach: Terrence Isaac; 1st season, 0–0 (–)
- Location: Detroit, Michigan
- Stadium: Tom Adams Field (capacity: 6,000)
- NCAA division: Division II
- Conference: GLIAC
- Colors: Green and gold
- All-time record: 473–583–33 (.449)

College Football Playoff appearances
- NCAA Div. II: 1 (2011)

Conference championships
- GLIAC: 1 (1975) PAC: 2 (1956, 1964)
- Consensus All-Americans: 60
- Fight song: WSU Victory Song
- Marching band: Wayne State Warrior Band
- Rivals: Grand Valley State, Saginaw Valley State
- Former nicknames: Tartars (1927–1999)
- Website: WSUAthletics.com

The Wayne State Warriors football team is the college football team at Wayne State University in Detroit, Michigan. The Wayne State football team played their first game in October 1918. The Wayne State Warriors have competed in the Great Lakes Intercollegiate Athletic Conference since 1999 (and previously from 1975 to 1989), and are currently a Division II member of the National Collegiate Athletic Association (NCAA). Wayne State plays their home games at Tom Adams Field at Wayne State Stadium. All Wayne State games are broadcast on WDTK radio.

== Home venue ==
The WSU football team had multiple venues during its early years, including Goldberg Field, University of Detroit Stadium and Keyworth Stadium. The first long-term location for the football team was Tartar Field, followed by Tom Adams Field in Wayne State Stadium.

== Mascot ==
The team changed its name from the Tartars to the Warriors in 1999. The mascot for the Warriors, “W”, debuted in 2005.

== All-Americans ==
The Warriors have had five All-American players in their history. In 2006, David Chudzinski was first team All-American for the offensive side of the ball. Joique Bell was another offensive player named 2009 first team All-American; he was also given the Harlon Hill Trophy in the same year. This award is given to the All-Around best player in Division II football. An all-purpose, first team All-American, Josh Renel, was named in 2010. Both Joe Long (offense) and Jeremy Jones (defense) were named 2011 first team All-Americans. Long was also awarded the Gene Upshaw Award in 2011. Leon Eggleston was First Team All American in 2019.

== National championship runner-up ==
After barely making the NCAA Division II Football Championship playoffs in 2011, the Warriors made it all the way to the national championship game before losing to the Pittsburg State Gorillas of Kansas. It was the first year that the football program had ever made it to the playoffs in their entire history. The Warriors won all of their road games, traveling across the country and ending up in Florence, AL for the championship game. A tragic shooting and murder of a WSU player, Cortez Smith, inspired the team for success.

== Conference championships ==
Year	Coach	Overall record	Conference record	Conference
1956	Herbert L. Smith	4–2–1	3–0–1	Presidents' Athletic Conference
1964	Stanley J. Marshall	4–3–1	4–1–1	Presidents' Athletic Conference
1975	Dick Lowry	8–3–0	3–1–0	Great Lakes Intercollegiate Athletic Conference

== Individual award winners ==
- GLIAC Coach of the Year

Dick Lowry – 1975
Paul Winters – 2006, 2008, 2019

- GLIAC Freshman of the Year

Joique Bell – 2006
Kevin Smith – 2008

== Warriors in the NFL ==
Wayne State has had six players drafted in the NFL.

== Notable Warrior coaches ==
- Norman "Happy" Wann – former head coach at Ball State
- Brian VanGorder – Defensive coordinator at Bowling Green State University; former defensive coordinator at Georgia and Notre Dame; Broyles Award winner

== Notable Warrior players ==
- Vic Zucco – former DB for the Chicago Bears
- Richard Byas, Jr. – former DB for the Atlanta Falcons
- John Sokolosky – former C for the Detroit Lions
- Paul Butcher – former LB for Detroit, St. Louis, Indianapolis, Carolina and Oakland
- Tom E. Beer – former FB and LB for the Detroit Lions
- Joique Bell – former RB for the Detroit Lions
