= Bernie Gaughan =

American football coach (1938–2018)

Biographical details
- Education: University of Tampa

Playing career
- Position: Defensive Back

Coaching career (HC unless noted)
- 1983–1987: Assumption Club Team
- 1988–1995: Assumption

Head coaching record
- Overall: 32–40–3 (college varsity football)

Bernie Gaughan is a retired American football coach. He served as the head coach at Assumption College in Worcester, Massachusetts, guiding that program from club status from 1983 to 1987 up to NCAA Division II varsity status from 1988 to 1995.

A graduate of the University of Tampa, Guaghan also coached high school athletic coach in Little Compton, Rhode Island and Clinton, Massachusetts.

== Head coaching record ==
(Note: Only includes 4–year varsity records)

Year	Team	Overall	Conference	Standing	Bowl/playoffs
Assumption Greyhounds (Independent) (1988–1995)
1988	Assumption	3–5			
1989	Assumption	0–7–1			
1990	Assumption	4–4			
1991	Assumption	1–8			
1992	Assumption	5–5			
1993	Assumption	6–4–1			
1994	Assumption	7–3–1			
1995	Assumption	6–4			
Iowa Wesleyan:		32–40–3			
Total:		32–40–3			
National championship Conference title Conference division title or championship game berth
