= Lyle Setencich =

American football player and coach (born 1945)

Biographical details
- Born: June 4, 1945 (age 81); Reedley, California, U.S.

Playing career
- 1963–1964: College of the Sequoias
- 1965–1966: Fresno State

Coaching career (HC unless noted)
- 1969: Washington Union HS (CA) (assistant)
- 1970–1973: Mount Diablo HS (CA) (assistant)
- 1974–1975: Albany HS (CA)
- 1975–1979: San Ramon Valley (CA)
- 1980 (spring): Boise State (DB)
- 1980–1982: Boise State (DC)
- 1983–1986: Boise State
- 1987–1993: Cal Poly
- 1994: Pacific (PA) (DC/ILB)
- 1995–1996: Arizona State (LB)
- 1997–2001: California (AHC/DC/LB)
- 2003–2007: Texas Tech (DC)

Head coaching record
- Overall: 65–49–2 (college)
- Tournaments: 1–1 (NCAA D-II playoffs)

Accomplishments and honors

Championships
- 1 Western Football Conference (1990)

Lyle Setencich (born June 4, 1945) is an American former college football player and coach. He served as the head football coach at Boise State University from 1983 to 1986 and California Polytechnic State University from 1987 to 1993, compiling a career head coaching record of 65–49–2 (.569).

== Early years ==
Born in Reedley, California, Setencich attended Washington Union High School in Fresno in 1963. After graduation in 1963, he played two years of junior college football at the College of the Sequoias in Visalia. Setencich transferred to Fresno State, where he was a two-year letterman and graduated with a degree in biological sciences (and physical education) in 1967. He served in the U.S. Army Reserve Medical Corps in 1972 for one year as a physical therapy specialist with the 828th station hospital in Fresno and held the rank of Specialist 5.

== High school coach ==
Setencich began his coaching career as a high school assistant at alma mater Washington in 1969, then at Mount Diablo (1970–73) in Concord in the East Bay Area. He was then a head coach at Albany (1974–75) and San Ramon Valley (1976–79) in Danville.

== College coach ==
Setencich moved to collegiate coaching in 1980 at Boise State, originally to coach defensive backs under fifth-year head coach Jim Criner, succeeding Dave Campo. When defensive coordinator Chuck Banker departed in February for the St. Louis Cardinals (special teams), Setencich was promoted to defensive coordinator. He helped lead the Broncos to the Big Sky title and the Division I-AA national championship in his first season and the semifinals in 1981. When Criner departed after the 1982 season for Iowa State, Setencich was promoted to head coach. He posted a 24–20 (.545) record in four seasons; his last in 1986 was the first losing campaign (5–6) for the program in four decades.

He resigned following the season and immediately became head coach at Cal Poly in San Luis Obispo, where he led the Division II program to a 41–29–2 (.583) mark in seven seasons (1987–1993). Setencich later coached at Pacific (1994) under Chuck Shelton, Arizona State (1995–1996) under Bruce Snyder, and California (1997–2001) under Tom Holmoe. In 2003, he became defensive coordinator at Texas Tech under head coach Mike Leach. During his fifth season, he resigned from that position for personal reasons on September 23, 2007.

== Head coaching record ==
=== College ===
Year	Team	Overall	Conference	Standing	Bowl/playoffs
Boise State Broncos (Big Sky Conference) (1983–1986)
1983	Boise State	6–5	4–3	T–3rd	
1984	Boise State	6–5	4–3	T–3rd	
1985	Boise State	7–4	5–2	3rd	
1986	Boise State	5–6	3–4	5th	
Boise State:		24–20	16–12		
Cal Poly Mustangs (Western Football Conference) (1987–1992)
1987	Cal Poly	7–3	3–3	T–3rd	
1988	Cal Poly	5–4–1	3–3	4th	
1989	Cal Poly	5–5	1–4	6th	
1990	Cal Poly	10–2	4–1	T–1st	L NCAA Division II Quarterfinal
1991	Cal Poly	4–6	2–3	4th	
1992	Cal Poly	4–5–1	2–3	T–4th	
Cal Poly Mustangs (American West Conference) (1993)
1993	Cal Poly	6–4	1–3	T–4th	
Cal Poly:		41–29–2	16–20		
Total:		65–49–2			
National championship Conference title Conference division title or championship game berth
