= Robert Maddox (American football) =

American football player and coach (born 1954)

Biographical details
- Born: June 1954 (age 72)

Playing career
- 1974–1977: Troy State

Coaching career (HC unless noted)
- 1983–1987: Troy State (assistant)
- 1988–1990: Troy State
- 1992–1999: Valley HS (AL)
- 2000–2001: Gardner–Webb (assistant)
- 2002–2005: Auburn HS (AL)
- 2006–2018: Lee-Scott Academy (AL)

Head coaching record
- Overall: 13–17 (college); 148–122 (high school)

Accomplishments and honors

Awards
- Alabama High School 5A Coach of the Year (1991)

Robert Maddox (born June 1954) is an American football coach and former player. He is currently retired. Maddox served as the head football coach at Troy State University—now Troy University—from 1988 to 1990, compiling a record of 13–17.

== Early career ==
Maddox was a walk-on defensive back at Auburn University fall 1972 then transferred to Samford University in Birmingham and played one season (73) after which Samford dropped the program. Maddox sit out one season then transferred to Troy State University and played in the '75 and '76 seasons earning 1st Team All-Gulf South Conference Team honors in his senior season. Upon graduation Maddox was an assistant high school football coach at Decatur High School, Alabama for two seasons. He returned to Troy State as an assistant under then head football coach Charlie Bradshaw in March 1979. In 1983, Chan Gailey became head coach at Troy State, and retained Maddox as an assistant coach working with defensive backs. Maddox was part of two national championships while at Troy State ('84 & '87). He was defensive coordinator on the 1987 team under head coach Rick Rhoades. Rhoades departed Troy State and Maddox took over as head coach and served three seasons ('88-'90).

== Head coach at Troy State ==
At Troy State, Maddox inherited a team which the previous season had gone 12–1–1, winning the NCAA Division II Football Championship. Despite this, in 1988, Troy State had its first losing season since 1982, going 4–6. The following season, the team showed little improvement, finishing with an identical 4–6 record. In 1990, Troy State improved slightly to 5–5, but Maddox resigned following a season-ending 24–23 win over Nicholls State.

== High school coaching career ==
Maddox became head coach at Valley High School in Valley, Alabama in 1991, where he immediately led the Rams to the fourth round of the Alabama High School Athletic Association class 5A playoffs and a 12–2 record. For this, he was named the Alabama High School Football Coach of the Year for class 5A. He remained at Valley through the 1997 season, amassing a 62–46 record and four region championships. In 1998, he reentered the college ranks as defensive coordinator at Gardner–Webb University, but returned to Alabama in 2002 as the head football coach at Auburn High School. At Auburn High, Maddox led the Tigers to four consecutive playoff appearances and won the region title in 2005. In 2006, Maddox was named 6-A Coach of the Year by the Alabama High School Coaches Association. After four seasons at Auburn High, Maddox retired from public school to become head football coach at Lee-Scott Academy for 13 seasons. He retired from coaching football in the spring of 2019.

== Head coaching record ==
=== College ===
Year	Team	Overall	Conference	Standing	Bowl/playoffs
Troy State Trojans (Gulf South Conference) (1988–1990)
1988	Troy State	4–6	3–5	T–5th	
1989	Troy State	4–6	3–5	T–6th	
1990	Troy State	5–5	4–4	T–5th	
Troy State:		13–17	10–14		
Total:		13–17			
