= 1988 Cal Poly Mustangs football team =

American college football season

1988 Cal Poly Mustangs football
- Conference: Western Football Conference
- Record: 5–4–1 (3–3 WFC)
- Head coach: Lyle Setencich (2nd season)
- Home stadium: Mustang Stadium

1988 Western Football Conference standings
	Conf.					Overall
Team	W		L		T	W		L		T
No. 4 Portland State $^	6	–	0	–	0	11	–	3	–	1
No. 10 Sacramento State ^	4	–	2	–	0	10	–	3	–	0
Santa Clara	4	–	2	–	0	7	–	4	–	0
Cal Poly	3	–	3	–	0	5	–	4	–	1
Cal State Northridge	2	–	4	–	0	6	–	5	–	0
Southern Utah State	2	–	4	–	0	4	–	7	–	0
Cal Lutheran	0	–	6	–	0	2	–	8	–	0
$ – Conference champion; ^ – NCAA Division II playoff participant; Rankings from NCAA Division II Football Committee poll

The 1988 Cal Poly Mustangs football team represented California Polytechnic State University, San Luis Obispo as a member of the Western Football Conference (WFC) during the 1988 NCAA Division II football season. Led by second-year head coach Lyle Setencich, Cal Poly compiled an overall record of 5–4–1 with a mark of 3–3 in conference play, placing fourth in the WFC. The team outscored its opponents 238 to 145 for the season. The Mustangs played home games at Mustang Stadium in San Luis Obispo, California.

== Schedule ==
Date	Opponent	Site	Result	Attendance	Source
September 10	Cameron*	Mustang Stadium; San Luis Obispo, CA	L 14–20	6,765	
September 17	at Portland State	Civic Stadium; Portland, OR	L 3–21	10,119	
September 24	Angelo State*	Mustang Stadium; San Luis Obispo, CA	W 15–8	3,200	
October 1	at No. 5 Cal State Northridge	North Campus Stadium; Northridge, CA	W 38–7	5,925	
October 8	Sacramento State	Mustang Stadium; San Luis Obispo, CA	L 29–30	3,750	
October 15	Cal Lutheran	Mustang Stadium; San Luis Obispo, CA	W 42–6	2,300	
October 22	Cal State Hayward*	Mustang Stadium; San Luis Obispo, CA	W 40–6	2,135–2,305	
October 29	at No. 17 UC Davis*	Toomey Field; Davis, CA (rivalry)	T 21–21	8,400	
November 5	Southern Utah State	Mustang Stadium; San Luis Obispo, CA	W 23–10	2,466–2,486	
November 12	at Santa Clara	Buck Shaw Stadium; Santa Clara, CA	L 13–16	3,411	
*Non-conference game; Rankings from NCAA Division II Football Committee Poll released prior to the game

== Team players in the NFL ==
The following Cal Poly Mustang players were selected in the 1989 NFL draft.

Player	Position	Round	Overall	NFL team
Chris Dunn	Linebacker	9	229	Atlanta Falcons
