= Dennis Creehan =

American gridiron football coach

Biographical details
- Born: August 16, 1949 (age 77); Pittsburgh, Pennsylvania, U.S.
- Education: Duquesne University

Coaching career (HC unless noted)
- 1971–1973: Keystone Oaks HS (PA) (assistant)
- 1974: Pittsburgh (GA)
- 1975: Carnegie Mellon (OC)
- 1976–1978: Edinboro (DC)
- 1979–1984: Edinboro
- 1985–1986: Edmonton Eskimos (DL/ST)
- 1987–1989: California (LB)
- 1990: San Francisco State
- 1991: Edmonton Eskimos (DL/ST)
- 1992–1996: South Dakota
- 1997: Arkansas State (DC)
- 1998–2000: Rutgers (DC)
- 2001–2002: Duke (ILB/ST)
- 2003: Army (OLB/ST)
- 2004–2007: Calgary Stampeders (DC)
- 2008: Hamilton Tiger-Cats (DC)
- 2009–2010: West Virginia Wesleyan
- 2012–2016: Alderson Broaddus
- 2017: The Spring League
- 2019: Salt Lake Stallions (LB)

Administrative career (AD unless noted)
- 2011–2019: Alderson Broaddus

Head coaching record
- Overall: 109–81–1

Accomplishments and honors

Championships
- 2 PSAC Western Division (1982, 1984); 1 GMAC (2016)

Awards
- PSAC Coach of the Year (1982); NCC Coach of the Year (1993); WVIAC Coach of the Year (2010); GMAC Coach of the Year (2016)

Dennis Creehan (born August 16, 1949) is an American gridiron football coach. He was most recently the athletic director at Alderson Broaddus University from 2011 to 2019.

Creehan served as the head football coach at Edinboro University of Pennsylvania (1979–1984), San Francisco State University (1990), the University of South Dakota (1992–1996), West Virginia Wesleyan College (2009–2010), and Alderson Broaddus (2012–2016). He is the only coach to have ever earned Coach of the Year awards in four conferences. He was a coach in The Spring League in 2017 and 2018. In October 2018, he was announced as the linebackers coach for the Salt Lake Stallions of the Alliance of American Football. Creehan took a leave of absence from Alderson Broaddus to accommodate the coaching position; the university named Carrie Bodkins his permanent replacement in May 2019.

== Head coaching record ==
Year	Team	Overall	Conference	Standing	Bowl/playoffs
Edinboro Fighting Scots (Pennsylvania State Athletic Conference) (1979–1984)
1979	Edinboro	4–6	2–4	T–4th (West)	
1980	Edinboro	6–2–1	3–2–1	T–2nd (West)	
1981	Edinboro	4–6	1–5	7th (West)	
1982	Edinboro	9–2	5–1	1st (West)	
1983	Edinboro	8–2	4–2	T–2nd (West)	
1984	Edinboro	8–2	4–2	T–1st (West)	
Edinboro:		39–20–1	19–16–1		
San Francisco State Gators (Northern California Athletic Conference) (1990)
1990	San Francisco State	4–7	1–4	T–4th	
San Francisco State:		4–7	1–4		
South Dakota Coyotes (North Central Conference) (1992–1996)
1992	South Dakota	3–8	2–7	5th	
1993	South Dakota	6–5	4–5	T–6th	
1994	South Dakota	5–6	3–6	T–7th	
1995	South Dakota	8–3	6–3	4th	
1996	South Dakota	6–5	4–5	T–6th	
South Dakota:		28–27	19–26		
West Virginia Wesleyan Bobcats (West Virginia Intercollegiate Athletic Conference) (2009–2010)
2009	West Virginia Wesleyan	2–8	2–6	T–7th	
2010	West Virginia Wesleyan	9–2	6–2	T–2nd	
West Virginia Wesleyan:		11–10	8–8		
Alderson Broaddus Battlers (NCAA Division II independent) (2013–2015)
2013	Alderson Broaddus	4–7			
2014	Alderson Broaddus	7–4			
2015	Alderson Broaddus	7–4			
Alderson Broaddus Battlers (Great Midwest Athletic Conference) (2016)
2016	Alderson Broaddus	9–2	2–0	1st	
Alderson Broaddus:		27–17	2–0		
Total:		109–81–1			
National championship Conference title Conference division title or championship game berth
