= 1988 Santa Clara Broncos football team =

American college football season

1988 Santa Clara Broncos football
- Conference: Western Football Conference
- Record: 7–4 (4–2 WFC)
- Head coach: Terry Malley (4th season)
- Home stadium: Buck Shaw Stadium

1988 Western Football Conference standings
	Conf.					Overall
Team	W		L		T	W		L		T
No. 4 Portland State $^	6	–	0	–	0	11	–	3	–	1
No. 10 Sacramento State ^	4	–	2	–	0	10	–	3	–	0
Santa Clara	4	–	2	–	0	7	–	4	–	0
Cal Poly	3	–	3	–	0	5	–	4	–	1
Cal State Northridge	2	–	4	–	0	6	–	5	–	0
Southern Utah State	2	–	4	–	0	4	–	7	–	0
Cal Lutheran	0	–	6	–	0	2	–	8	–	0
$ – Conference champion; ^ – NCAA Division II playoff participant; Rankings from NCAA Division II Football Committee poll

The 1988 Santa Clara Broncos football team represented Santa Clara University as a member of the Western Football Conference (WFC) during the 1988 NCAA Division II football season. The Broncos were led by fourth-year head coach Terry Malley. They played home games at Buck Shaw Stadium in Santa Clara, California. Santa Clara finished the season with a record of seven wins and four losses (7–4, 4–2 WFC). The Broncos outscored their opponents 251–233 for the season.

== Schedule ==
Date	Opponent	Site	Result	Attendance	Source
September 3	at Chico State*	University Stadium; Chico, CA	W 25–16	4,000–4,127	
September 10	UC Davis*	Buck Shaw Stadium; Santa Clara, CA	L 10–21	6,823	
September 17	San Francisco State*	Buck Shaw Stadium; Santa Clara, CA	W 35–0	6,414	
September 24	at Cal State Hayward*	Pioneer Stadium; Hayward, CA	W 31–20	750–1,253	
October 1	at Portland State	Civic Stadium; Portland, OR	L 0–42	7,069	
October 8	Southern Utah State	Buck Shaw Stadium; Santa Clara, CA	W 34–32	6,788	
October 15	at No. 15 Sacramento State	Hornet Stadium; Sacramento, CA	L 14–28	4,500	
October 22	at Cal Lutheran	Mt. Clef Field; Thousand Oaks, CA	W 31–7	3,750	
October 29	Cal State Northridge	Buck Shaw Stadium; Santa Clara, CA	W 31–27	1,892	
November 5	at Saint Mary's*	Saint Mary's Stadium; Moraga, CA	L 24–27	6,000	
November 12	Cal Poly	Buck Shaw Stadium; Santa Clara, CA	W 16–13	3,411	
*Non-conference game; Rankings from NCAA Division II Football Committee Poll released prior to the game
