= 1988 San Francisco State Gators football team =

American college football season

1988 San Francisco State Gators football
- Conference: Northern California Athletic Conference
- Record: 1–9 (1–4 NCAC)
- Head coach: Vic Rowen (28th season)
- Home stadium: Cox Stadium

1988 Northern California Athletic Conference football standings
| | Conf. | | | | | Overall |
| Team | W | | L | | T | W | | L | | T |
|---|---|---|---|---|---|---|---|---|---|---|
| No. 13 UC Davis $^ | 5 | – | 0 | – | 0 | 7 | – | 3 | – | 1 |
| Sonoma State | 3 | – | 2 | – | 0 | 5 | – | 5 | – | 0 |
| Chico State | 3 | – | 2 | – | 0 | 3 | – | 7 | – | 0 |
| Humboldt State | 2 | – | 3 | – | 0 | 4 | – | 6 | – | 0 |
| Cal State Hayward | 1 | – | 4 | – | 0 | 2 | – | 9 | – | 0 |
| San Francisco State | 1 | – | 4 | – | 0 | 1 | – | 9 | – | 0 |
$ – Conference champion; ^ – NCAA Division II playoff participant; Rankings from NCAA Division II Football Committee poll

The 1988 San Francisco State Gators football team represented San Francisco State University as a member of the Northern California Athletic Conference (NCAC) during the 1988 NCAA Division II football season. Led by 28th-year head coach Vic Rowen, San Francisco State compiled an overall record of 1–9 with a mark of 1–4 in conference play, tying for fifth place in the NCAC. For the season the team was outscored by its opponents 333 to 74. The Gators played home games at Cox Stadium in San Francisco.

== Schedule ==
| Date | Opponent | Site | Result | Attendance | Source |
|---|---|---|---|---|---|
| September 10 | Cal State Northridge* | Cox Stadium; San Francisco, CA | L 0–48 | 300 | |
| September 17 | at Santa Clara* | Buck Shaw Stadium; Santa Clara, CA | L 0–35 | 6,414 | |
| September 24 | at UC Santa Barbara* | Harder Stadium; Santa Barbara, CA | L 6–16 | 4,260 | |
| October 1 | UC Davis | Cox Stadium; San Francisco, CA | L 0–35 | 300–500 | |
| October 8 | at Saint Mary's* | Saint Mary's Stadium; Moraga, CA | L 0–54 | 1,325 | |
| October 15 | Menlo* | Cox Stadium; San Francisco, CA | L 21–22 | 500 | |
| October 22 | Chico State | Cox Stadium; San Francisco, CA | L 9–31 | 300 | |
| October 29 | Humboldt State | Cox Stadium; San Francisco, CA | W 30–14 | 200–300 | |
| November 5 | at Cal State Hayward | Pioneer Stadium; Hayward, CA | L 0–44 | 500–800 | |
| November 12 | at Sonoma State | Cossacks Stadium; Rohnert Park, CA | L 8–34 | 865 | |
*Non-conference game
