= 1990 Chico State Wildcats football team =

American college football season

1990 Chico State Wildcats football
- Conference: Northern California Athletic Conference
- Record: 4–6 (3–2 NCAC)
- Head coach: Gary Hauser (2nd season)
- Home stadium: University Stadium

1990 Northern California Athletic Conference football standings
	Conf.					Overall
Team	W		L		T	W		L		T
UC Davis $	5	–	0	–	0	7	–	3	–	0
Sonoma State	4	–	1	–	0	7	–	3	–	0
Chico State	3	–	2	–	0	4	–	6	–	0
San Francisco State	1	–	4	–	0	4	–	7	–	0
Humboldt State	1	–	4	–	0	2	–	8	–	1
Cal State Hayward	1	–	4	–	0	2	–	9	–	0
$ – Conference champion; The first Humboldt State vs. Cal State Hayward game did not count as a conference game.

The 1990 Chico State Wildcats football team represented California State University, Chico as a member of the Northern California Athletic Conference (NCAC) during the 1990 NCAA Division II football season. Led by second-year head coach Gary Hauser, Chico State compiled an overall record of 4–6 with a mark of 3–2 in conference play, placing third in the NCAC. The team outscored its opponents 287 to 246 for the season. The Wildcats played home games at University Stadium in Chico, California.

== Schedule ==
Date	Opponent	Site	Result	Attendance	Source
September 1	Santa Clara*	University Stadium; Chico, CA	L 19–21	3,714–3,741	
September 8	at Humboldt State	Redwood Bowl; Arcata, CA	W 45–21	3,400	
September 15	Azusa Pacific*	University Stadium; Chico, CA	W 58–21	2,215	
September 22	at UC Santa Barbara*	Harder Stadium; Santa Barbara, CA	L 27–31	2,128	
September 29	Saint Mary's*	University Stadium; Chico, CA	L 18–21	3,487	
October 6	at Idaho*	Kibbie Dome; Moscow, ID	L 21–59	7,600	
October 13	at San Francisco State	Cox Stadium; San Francisco, CA	W 17–7	1,700	
October 20	at UC Davis	Toomey Field; Davis, CA	L 18–24	7,300	
October 27	No. T–20 Sonoma State	University Stadium; Chico, CA	L 17–27	4,857	
November 10	Cal State Hayward	University Stadium; Chico, CA	W 47–14	850–2,372	
*Non-conference game; Rankings from NCAA Division II Football Committee Poll released prior to the game
