= 1990 Troy State Trojans football team =

American college football season

1990 Troy State Trojans football
- Conference: Gulf South Conference
- Record: 5–5 (4–4 GSC)
- Head coach: Robert Maddox (3rd season)
- Offensive coordinator: Willie J. Slater (5th season)
- Offensive scheme: Wishbone
- Defensive coordinator: Johnny Williams (3rd season)
- Home stadium: Veterans Memorial Stadium

1990 Gulf South Conference football standings
	Conf.					Overall
Team	W		L		T	W		L		T
No. 2 Mississippi College $^	8	–	0	–	0	11	–	2	–	0
No. 10 Jacksonville State ^	6	–	2	–	0	9	–	3	–	0
No. 15 North Alabama ^	6	–	2	–	0	8	–	3	–	0
Valdosta State	5	–	3	–	0	5	–	5	–	0
Delta State	4	–	4	–	0	5	–	5	–	0
Troy State	4	–	4	–	0	5	–	5	–	0
Tennessee–Martin	2	–	6	–	0	0	–	4	–	7
Livingston	1	–	7	–	0	0	–	3	–	9
West Georgia	0	–	8	–	0	1	–	10	–	0
$ – Conference champion; ^ – NCAA Division II playoff participant; Rankings from NCAA Division II Football Committee poll

The 1990 Troy State Trojans football team represented Troy State University (now known as Troy University) as a member of the Gulf South Conference (GSC) during the 1990 NCAA Division II football season. Led by third-year head coach Robert Maddox, the Trojans compiled an overall record of 5–5, with a mark of 4–4 in conference play, and finished tied for fifth in the GSC.

== Schedule ==
Date	Opponent	Site	Result	Attendance	Source
September 1	at UCF*	Citrus Bowl; Orlando, FL	L 10–16	22,462	
September 8	vs. West Georgia	Garrett Stadium; Phenix City, AL	W 28–7	4,000	
September 15	Livingston	Veterans Memorial Stadium; Troy, AL	W 31–6	6,400	
September 29	Valdosta State	Veterans Memorial Stadium; Troy, AL	L 20–22	6,750	
October 6	at No. 2 Mississippi College	Robinson-Hale Stadium; Clinton, MS	L 16–36	6,110	
October 13	Delta State	Veterans Memorial Stadium; Troy, AL	W 42–28	3,100	
October 20	at North Alabama	Braly Municipal Stadium; Florence, AL	L 6–17	4,900	
October 27	Tennessee–Martin	Veterans Memorial Stadium; Troy, AL	W 41–33	9,000	
November 3	at No. 12 Jacksonville State	Paul Snow Stadium; Jacksonville, AL (rivalry)	L 10–21	15,500	
November 10	Nicholls State*	Veterans Memorial Stadium; Troy, AL	W 24–23	3,000	
*Non-conference game; Rankings from NCAA Division II Football Committee Poll released prior to the game
