= 1988 Chico State Wildcats football team =

American college football season

1988 Chico State Wildcats football
- Conference: Northern California Athletic Conference
- Record: 3–7 (3–2 NCAC)
- Head coach: Mike Bellotti (5th season)
- Home stadium: University Stadium

1988 Northern California Athletic Conference football standings
	Conf.					Overall
Team	W		L		T	W		L		T
No. 13 UC Davis $^	5	–	0	–	0	7	–	3	–	1
Sonoma State	3	–	2	–	0	5	–	5	–	0
Chico State	3	–	2	–	0	3	–	7	–	0
Humboldt State	2	–	3	–	0	4	–	6	–	0
Cal State Hayward	1	–	4	–	0	2	–	9	–	0
San Francisco State	1	–	4	–	0	1	–	9	–	0
$ – Conference champion; ^ – NCAA Division II playoff participant; Rankings from NCAA Division II Football Committee poll

The 1988 Chico State Wildcats football team represented California State University, Chico as a member of the Northern California Athletic Conference (NCAC) during the 1988 NCAA Division II football season. Led by Mike Bellotti in his fifth and final season as head coach, Chico State compiled an overall record of 3–7 with a mark of 3–2 in conference play, tying for second place in the NCAC. The team was outscored by its opponents 231 to 205 for the season. The Wildcats played home games at University Stadium in Chico, California.

Bellotti finished his tenure as Chico State with an overall record of 21–25–2, for a .458 winning percentage. He left Chico State to become the offensive coordinator at the University of Oregon, and later served as head football coach, from 1995 to 2008.

== Schedule ==
Date	Opponent	Site	Result	Attendance	Source
September 3	Santa Clara*	University Stadium; Chico, CA	L 16–25	4,000–4,127	
September 10	Sacramento State*	University Stadium; Chico, CA	L 16–48	3,500	
September 17	at UC Santa Barbara*	Harder Stadium; Santa Barbara, CA	L 16–17	1,388	
September 24	Emporia State*	University Stadium; Chico, CA	L 0–23	1,200	
October 1	Saint Mary's*	University Stadium; Chico, CA	L 34–38	2,500	
October 8	at Humboldt State	Redwood Bowl; Arcata, CA	W 31–7	4,500	
October 22	at San Francisco State	Cox Stadium; San Francisco, CA	W 31–9	300	
October 29	Cal State Hayward	University Stadium; Chico, CA	W 38–14	500–1,200	
November 5	Sonoma State	University Stadium; Chico, CA	L 10–14	1,500	
November 12	at No. 13 UC Davis	Toomey Field; Davis, CA	L 13–36	7,400	
*Non-conference game; Rankings from NCAA Division II Football Committee Poll released prior to the game
