= 1988 Sonoma State Cossacks football team =

American college football season

1988 Sonoma State Cossacks football
- Conference: Northern California Athletic Conference
- Record: 5–5 (3–2 NCAC)
- Head coach: Marty Fine (2nd season)
- Home stadium: Cossacks Stadium

1988 Northern California Athletic Conference football standings
	Conf.					Overall
Team	W		L		T	W		L		T
No. 13 UC Davis $^	5	–	0	–	0	7	–	3	–	1
Sonoma State	3	–	2	–	0	5	–	5	–	0
Chico State	3	–	2	–	0	3	–	7	–	0
Humboldt State	2	–	3	–	0	4	–	6	–	0
Cal State Hayward	1	–	4	–	0	2	–	9	–	0
San Francisco State	1	–	4	–	0	1	–	9	–	0
$ – Conference champion; ^ – NCAA Division II playoff participant; Rankings from NCAA Division II Football Committee poll

The 1988 Sonoma State Cossacks football team represented Sonoma State University as a member of the Northern California Athletic Conference (NCAC) during the 1988 NCAA Division II football season. Led by Marty Fine in his second and final season as head coach, Sonoma State compiled an overall record of 5–5 with a mark of 3–2 in conference play, tying for second place in the NCAC. The team was outscored by its opponents 225 to 200 for the season. The Cossacks played home games at Cossacks Stadium (Note: Cossacks Stadium was renamed in 2002 to Seawolf Stadium when the University changed the name of the mascot to Seawolves.) in Rohnert Park, California.

Fine finished his tenure as at Sonoma State with an overall record of 10–11, for a .476 winning percentage.

== Schedule ==
Date	Opponent	Site	Result	Attendance	Source
September 10	at Cal Lutheran*	Mt. Clef Field; Thousand Oaks, CA	L 13–17	2,144–2,246	
September 17	Cal State Northridge*	Cossacks Stadium; Rohnert Park, CA	L 6–31	1,242	
September 24	Menlo*	Cossacks Stadium; Rohnert Park, CA	W 29–19	628	
October 1	Cal State Hayward	Cossacks Stadium; Rohnert Park, CA	W 19–7	567	
October 8	at UC Santa Barbara*	Harder Stadium; Santa Barbara, CA	W 20–18	2,459	
October 15	at UC Davis	Toomey Field; Davis, CA	L 13–42	4,700	
October 22	Humboldt State	Cossacks Stadium; Rohnert Park, CA	L 18–38	1,012	
October 29	at Saint Mary's*	Saint Mary's Stadium; Moraga, CA	L 34–35	3,050	
November 5	at Chico State	University Stadium; Chico, CA	W 14–10	1,500	
November 12	San Francisco State	Cossacks Stadium; Rohnert Park, CA	W 34–8	865	
*Non-conference game
