= 1988 Cal State Hayward Pioneers football team =

American college football season

1988 Cal State Hayward Pioneers football
- Conference: Northern California Athletic Conference
- Record: 2–9 (1–4 NCAC)
- Head coach: Tim Tierney (14th season)
- Home stadium: Pioneer Stadium

1988 Northern California Athletic Conference football standings
	Conf.					Overall
Team	W		L		T	W		L		T
No. 13 UC Davis $^	5	–	0	–	0	7	–	3	–	1
Sonoma State	3	–	2	–	0	5	–	5	–	0
Chico State	3	–	2	–	0	3	–	7	–	0
Humboldt State	2	–	3	–	0	4	–	6	–	0
Cal State Hayward	1	–	4	–	0	2	–	9	–	0
San Francisco State	1	–	4	–	0	1	–	9	–	0
$ – Conference champion; ^ – NCAA Division II playoff participant; Rankings from NCAA Division II Football Committee poll

The 1988 Cal State Hayward Pioneers football team represented California State University, Hayward—now known as California State University, East Bay—as a member of the Northern California Athletic Conference (NCAC) during the 1988 NCAA Division II football season. Led by 14th-year head coach Tim Tierney, Cal State Hayward compiled an overall record of 2–9 with a mark of 1–4 in conference play, tying for fifth place in the NCAC. The team was outscored by its opponents 229 to 145 for the season. The Pioneers played home games at Pioneer Stadium in Hayward, California.

== Schedule ==
Date	Opponent	Site	Result	Attendance	Source
September 3	at Cal State Northridge*	North Campus Stadium; Northridge, CA	L 0–17	4,132–4,523	
September 10	UC Santa Barbara*	Pioneer Stadium; Hayward, CA	W 21–7	300–350	
September 17	Cal Lutheran*	Pioneer Stadium; Hayward, CA	L 6–16	320–400	
September 24	Santa Clara*	Pioneer Stadium; Hayward, CA	L 20–31	750–1,253	
October 1	at Sonoma State	Cossacks Stadium (Note: Seawolf Stadium was known as Cossacks Stadium until 2002 when the University changed the mascot from Cossacks to Seawolves.); Rohnert Park, CA	L 7–19	567	
October 8	UC Davis	Pioneer Stadium; Hayward, CA	L 14–30	1,300	
October 15	Saint Mary's*	Pioneer Stadium; Hayward, CA	L 0–17	400	
October 22	at Cal Poly*	Mustang Stadium; San Luis Obispo, CA	L 6–40	2,135–2,305	
October 29	at Chico State	University Stadium; Chico, CA	L 14–38	500–1,200	
November 5	San Francisco State	Pioneer Stadium; Hayward, CA	W 44–0	500–800	
November 12	at Humboldt State	Redwood Bowl; Arcata, CA	L 13–14	600	
*Non-conference game
