= 1988 Humboldt State Lumberjacks football team =

American college football season

1988 Humboldt State Lumberjacks football
- Conference: Northern California Athletic Conference
- Record: 4–6 (2–3 NCAC)
- Head coach: Mike Dolby (3rd season)
- Offensive coordinator: Bart Andrus (3rd season)
- Home stadium: Redwood Bowl

1988 Northern California Athletic Conference football standings
	Conf.					Overall
Team	W		L		T	W		L		T
No. 13 UC Davis $^	5	–	0	–	0	7	–	3	–	1
Sonoma State	3	–	2	–	0	5	–	5	–	0
Chico State	3	–	2	–	0	3	–	7	–	0
Humboldt State	2	–	3	–	0	4	–	6	–	0
Cal State Hayward	1	–	4	–	0	2	–	9	–	0
San Francisco State	1	–	4	–	0	1	–	9	–	0
$ – Conference champion; ^ – NCAA Division II playoff participant; Rankings from NCAA Division II Football Committee poll

The 1988 Humboldt State Lumberjacks football team represented Humboldt State University—now known as California State Polytechnic University, Humboldt—as a member of the Northern California Athletic Conference (NCAC) during the 1988 NCAA Division II football season. Led by third-year head coach Mike Dolby, the Lumberjacks compiled an overall record of 4–6 with a mark of 2–3 in conference play, placing fourth in the NCAC. The team was outscored by its opponents 266 to 173 for the season. Humboldt State played home games at the Redwood Bowl in Arcata, California.

== Schedule ==
Date	Opponent	Site	Result	Attendance	Source
September 10	at Saint Mary’s*	Saint Mary’s Stadium; Moraga, CA	L 10–36	1,750	
September 17	at Sacramento State*	Hornet Stadium; Sacramento, CA	L 17–55	5,800	
September 24	at Whittier*	Memorial Stadium; Whittier, CA	W 37–14	1,500	
October 1	Azusa Pacific*	Redwood Bowl; Arcata, CA	W 13–12	3,200	
October 8	Chico State	Redwood Bowl; Arcata, CA	L 7–31	4,500	
October 15	UC Santa Barbara*	Redwood Bowl; Arcata, CA	L 21–31	1,200–1,700	
October 22	at Sonoma State	Cossacks Stadium (Note: Seawolf Stadium was known as Cossacks Stadium until 2002 when the University changed the mascot from Cossacks to Seawolves.); Rohnert Park, CA	W 38–18	1,012	
October 29	at San Francisco State	Cox Stadium; San Francisco, CA	L 14–30	200–300	
November 5	No. 15 UC Davis	Redwood Bowl; Arcata, CA	L 2–26	800	
November 12	Cal State Hayward	Redwood Bowl; Arcata, CA	W 14–13	600	
*Non-conference game; Rankings from NCAA Division II Football Committee Poll released prior to the game

== Team players in the NFL ==
No Humboldt State players were selected in the 1989 NFL draft. The following finished their college career in 1988, were not drafted, but played in the NFL.

Player	Position	First NFL team
Richard Ashe	Tight end	1990 Los Angeles Rams
