= 1990 UC Davis Aggies football team =

American college football season

1990 UC Davis Aggies football

NCAC champion
- Conference: Northern California Athletic Conference
- Record: 7–3 (5–0 NCAC)
- Head coach: Bob Foster (2nd season)
- Home stadium: Toomey Field

1990 Northern California Athletic Conference football standings
	Conf.					Overall
Team	W		L		T	W		L		T
UC Davis $	5	–	0	–	0	7	–	3	–	0
Sonoma State	4	–	1	–	0	7	–	3	–	0
Chico State	3	–	2	–	0	4	–	6	–	0
San Francisco State	1	–	4	–	0	4	–	7	–	0
Humboldt State	1	–	4	–	0	2	–	8	–	1
Cal State Hayward	1	–	4	–	0	2	–	9	–	0
$ – Conference champion; The first Humboldt State vs. Cal State Hayward game did not count as a conference game.

The 1990 UC Davis football team represented the University of California, Davis as a member of the Northern California Athletic Conference (NCAC) during the 1990 NCAA Division II football season. Led by second-year head coach Bob Foster, the Aggies compiled an overall record of 7–3 with a mark of 5–0 in conference play, winning the NCAC title for the 20th consecutive season. 1990 was the 21st consecutive winning season for the Aggies, and their 5–0 record in NCAC play extended the team's conference winning streak to 51 games dating back to the 1981 season. UC Davis outscored its opponents 234 to 166 for the season. The Aggies played home games at Toomey Field in Davis, California.

== Schedule ==
Date	Opponent	Rank	Site	Result	Attendance	Source
September 8	at Santa Clara*	No. 10	Buck Shaw Stadium; Santa Clara, CA	W 31–19	5,500	
September 15	Saint Mary's*	No. 8	Toomey Field; Davis, CA	W 35–19	7,300	
September 22	at Sacramento State*	No. 7	Charles C. Hughes Stadium; Sacramento, CA (Causeway Classic)	L 12–16	15,400	
September 29	at Cal State Northridge*	No. 19	North Campus Stadium; Northridge, CA	L 10–14	3,806	
October 6	Cal Poly*		Toomey Field; Davis, CA (rivalry)	L 0–19	5,700	
October 13	at Humboldt State		Redwood Bowl; Arcata, CA	W 45–22	3,150	
October 20	Chico State		Toomey Field; Davis, CA	W 24–18	7,300	
October 27	at San Francisco State		Cox Stadium; San Francisco, CA	W 27–25	3,065	
November 3	at Cal State Hayward		Pioneer Stadium; Hayward, CA	W 38–7	1,300–2,000	
November 10	No. 16 Sonoma State		Toomey Field; Davis, CA	W 12–7	8,600	
*Non-conference game; Rankings from NCAA Division II Football Committee Poll released prior to the game

== NFL draft ==
The following UC Davis Aggies players were selected in the 1991 NFL draft.

Round	Pick	Player	Position	NFL team
12	309	Jeff Bridewell	Quarterback	Phoenix Cardinals
