= 1988 Troy State Trojans football team =

American college football season

1988 Troy State Trojans football
- Conference: Gulf South Conference
- Record: 4–6 (3–5 GSC)
- Head coach: Robert Maddox (1st season)
- Offensive coordinator: Willie J. Slater (3rd season)
- Offensive scheme: Wishbone
- Defensive coordinator: Johnny Williams (1st season)
- Home stadium: Veterans Memorial Stadium

1988 Gulf South Conference football standings
	Conf.					Overall
Team	W		L		T	W		L		T
No. 9 Tennessee–Martin +^	7	–	1	–	0	11	–	2	–	0
No. 7 Jacksonville State +^	7	–	1	–	0	10	–	2	–	0
No. 6 Mississippi College +^	7	–	1	–	0	9	–	3	–	0
Valdosta State	4	–	3	–	1	6	–	3	–	1
Troy State	3	–	5	–	0	4	–	6	–	0
West Georgia	3	–	5	–	0	4	–	6	–	0
Delta State	2	–	5	–	1	4	–	6	–	1
North Alabama	2	–	6	–	0	2	–	8	–	0
Livingston	0	–	8	–	0	0	–	11	–	0
+ – Conference co-champions; ^ – NCAA Division II playoff participant; Rankings from NCAA Division II Football Committee poll

The 1988 Troy State Trojans football team represented Troy State University (now known as Troy University) as a member of the Gulf South Conference (GSC) during the 1988 NCAA Division II football season. Led by first-year head coach Robert Maddox, the Trojans compiled an overall record of 4–6, with a mark of 3–5 in conference play, and finished tied for fifth in the GSC.

== Schedule ==
Date	Opponent	Rank	Site	Result	Attendance	Source
September 3	Southeast Missouri State*	No. 1	Veterans Memorial Stadium; Troy, AL	W 26–13	3,000	
September 10	Livingston	No. 1	Veterans Memorial Stadium; Troy, AL	W 28–14	3,282	
September 17	at No. 3 UCF*	No. 1	Citrus Bowl; Orlando, FL	L 18–26	31,789	
September 24	at West Georgia	No. T–8	Grisham Stadium; Carrollton, GA	W 38–3	2,500	
October 1	Valdosta State	No. 8	Veterans Memorial Stadium; Troy, AL	L 16–21	3,000	
October 8	at Mississippi College		Robinson-Hale Stadium; Clinton, MS	L 12–18	4,100	
October 15	Delta State		Veterans Memorial Stadium; Troy, AL	L 21–24	7,200	
October 22	at North Alabama		Braly Municipal Stadium; Florence, AL	W 30–7	4,100	
October 29	No. 12 Tennessee–Martin		Veterans Memorial Stadium; Troy, AL	L 23–27	10,000	
November 5	at No. 7 Jacksonville State		Paul Snow Stadium; Jacksonville, AL (rivalry)	L 3–31	15,350	
*Non-conference game; Rankings from NCAA Division II Football Committee Poll released prior to the game
