= 1990 San Francisco State Gators football team =

American college football season

1990 San Francisco State Gators football
- Conference: Northern California Athletic Conference
- Record: 4–7 (1–4 NCAC)
- Head coach: Dennis Creehan (1st season)
- Home stadium: Cox Stadium

1990 Northern California Athletic Conference football standings
	Conf.					Overall
Team	W		L		T	W		L		T
UC Davis $	5	–	0	–	0	7	–	3	–	0
Sonoma State	4	–	1	–	0	7	–	3	–	0
Chico State	3	–	2	–	0	4	–	6	–	0
San Francisco State	1	–	4	–	0	4	–	7	–	0
Humboldt State	1	–	4	–	0	2	–	8	–	1
Cal State Hayward	1	–	4	–	0	2	–	9	–	0
$ – Conference champion; The first Humboldt State vs. Cal State Hayward game did not count as a conference game.

The 1990 San Francisco State Gators football team represented San Francisco State University as a member of the Northern California Athletic Conference (NCAC) during the 1990 NCAA Division II football season. Led by Dennis Creehan in his first and only season as head coach, San Francisco State compiled an overall record of 4–7 with a mark of 1–4 in conference play, placing in a three-way tie for fourth place in the NCAC. For the season the team was outscored by its opponents 253 to 237. The Gators played home games at Cox Stadium in San Francisco.

== Schedule ==
Date	Opponent	Site	Result	Attendance	Source
September 1	at Saint Mary's*	Saint Mary's Stadium; Moraga, CA	L 28–52	3,501	
September 15	at Santa Clara*	Buck Shaw Stadium; Santa Clara, CA	L 10–28	6,231	
September 22	Menlo*	Cox Stadium; San Francisco, CA	L 6–9	701	
September 29	at UC Santa Barbara*	Campus Stadium; Santa Barbara, CA	W 42–26	2,008	
October 6	at Redlands*	Ted Runner Stadium; Redlands, CA	W 27–21	3,100	
October 13	Chico State	Cox Stadium; San Francisco, CA	L 7–17	1,700	
October 20	at Cal State Hayward	Pioneer Stadium; Hayward, CA	L 13–19	1,000–1,400	
October 27	UC Davis	Cox Stadium; San Francisco, CA	L 25–27	3,065	
November 3	at Sonoma State	Cossacks Stadium; Rohnert Park, CA	L 17–33	1,288	
November 10	Humboldt State	Cox Stadium; San Franciscom CA	W 38–15	1,735	
November 17	at Cal Lutheran*	Mt. Clef Field; Thousand Oaks, CA	W 31–6	1,500	
*Non-conference game

== Team players in the NFL ==
The following San Francisco State players were selected in the 1991 NFL draft.

Round	Pick	Player	Position	NFL team
7	175	Doug Parrish	Defensive back	New York Jets
