= 1990 Cal Poly Mustangs football team =

American college football season

1990 Cal Poly Mustangs football

WFC co-champion

NCAA Division II Quarterfinal, L 0–47 at North Dakota State
- Conference: Western Football Conference
- Record: 10–2 (4–1 WFC)
- Head coach: Lyle Setencich (4th season)
- Home stadium: Mustang Stadium

1990 Western Football Conference standings
	Conf.					Overall
Team	W		L		T	W		L		T
No. 8 Cal Poly +^	4	–	1	–	0	10	–	2	–	0
No. 13 Cal State Northridge +^	4	–	1	–	0	7	–	4	–	0
Portland State	2	–	3	–	0	6	–	5	–	0
Santa Clara	2	–	3	–	0	6	–	5	–	0
Southern Utah State	2	–	3	–	0	6	–	5	–	0
Sacramento State	1	–	4	–	0	4	–	6	–	0
+ – Conference co-champions; ^ – NCAA Division II playoff participant; Rankings from NCAA Division II Football Committee poll

The 1990 Cal Poly Mustangs football team represented California Polytechnic State University, San Luis Obispo as a member of the Western Football Conference (WFC) during the 1990 NCAA Division II football season. Led by fourth-year head coach Lyle Setencich, Cal Poly compiled an overall record of 10–2 with a mark of 4–1 in conference play, sharing the WFC title with Cal State Northridge. The Mustangs advanced to the NCAA Division II Football Championship playoffs, beating Cal State Northridge in the first round before losing to the eventual national champion, North Dakota State, in the quarterfinals. The team outscored its opponents 304 to 167 for the season. The Mustangs played home games at Mustang Stadium in San Luis Obispo, California.

== Schedule ==
Date	Opponent	Rank	Site	Result	Attendance	Source
September 8	at West Texas State*		Kimbrough Memorial Stadium; Canyon, TX	W 48–13	1,090–2,536	
September 15	Sonoma State*		Mustang Stadium; San Luis Obispo, CA	W 32–7	5,239	
September 22	at No. 4 Portland State	No. 19	Civic Stadium; Portland, OR	W 36–23	14,733	
September 29	at Cal State Hayward*	No. 8	Pioneer Stadium; Hayward, CA	W 35–16	500–1,555	
October 6	at UC Davis*	No. 8	Toomey Field; Davis, CA (rivalry)	W 19–0	5,700	
October 13	Sacramento State	No. 7	Mustang Stadium; San Luis Obispo, CA	L 17–20	6,375	
October 20	at No. 18 Santa Clara	No. 16	Buck Shaw Stadium; Santa Clara, CA	W 29–0	6,000	
October 27	Southern Utah State	No. 11	Mustang Stadium; San Luis Obispo, CA	W 42–21	4,438	
November 3	at No. 7 Cal State Northridge	No. 10	North Campus Stadium; Northridge, CA	W 6–3	7,127	
November 10	Millersville*	No. 8	Mustang Stadium; San Luis Obispo, CA	W 26–10	4,196	
November 17	No. 13 Cal State Northridge*	No. 8	Mustang Stadium; San Luis Obispo, CA (NCAA Division II First Round)	W 14–7		
November 24	at No. 1 North Dakota State*	No. 8	Dacotah Field; Fargo, ND (NCAA Division II Quarterfinal)	L 0–47	8,253	
*Non-conference game; Rankings from NCAA Division II Football Committee Poll released prior to the game
