= 1988 UC Santa Barbara Gauchos football team =

American college football season

1988 UC Santa Barbara Gauchos football
- Conference: Independent
- Record: 6–4
- Head coach: Mike Warren (3rd season)
- Home stadium: Harder Stadium

1988 NCAA Division III independents football records
	Conf.			Overall
Team	W	L	T	W		L		T
Cortland ^		–		11	–	1	–	0
Ferrum ^		–		11	–	1	–	0
Dayton ^		–		9	–	2	–	0
Hofstra ^		–		9	–	2	–	0
Rochester (NY)		–		8	–	2	–	0
Wagner ^		–		8	–	2	–	0
Aurora		–		7	–	2	–	0
Menlo		–		7	–	2	–	0
Wabash		–		7	–	2	–	0
Fairleigh Dickinson–Florham		–		6	–	2	–	0
Georgetown		–		6	–	2	–	0
Drake		–		7	–	3	–	0
Canisius		–		6	–	3	–	0
Mercyhurst		–		6	–	3	–	0
Salisbury State		–		6	–	3	–	0
Millsaps		–		5	–	3	–	0
Catholic University		–		6	–	4	–	0
UC Santa Barbara		–		6	–	4	–	0
San Diego		–		5	–	4	–	0
Albany		–		5	–	5	–	0
Quincy		–		5	–	5	–	0
Samford		–		5	–	6	–	0
Union (NY)		–		4	–	4	–	0
Colorado College		–		4	–	5	–	0
DePauw		–		4	–	5	–	0
Brockport		–		4	–	6	–	0
Frostburg State		–		4	–	6	–	0
Maryville (TN)		–		4	–	6	–	0
Norwich		–		4	–	6	–	0
Marist		–		3	–	6	–	0
Western Connecticut State		–		3	–	7	–	0
Duquesne		–		2	–	7	–	0
Buffalo		–		2	–	8	–	0
Buffalo State		–		1	–	7	–	0
Saint Francis (PA)		–		1	–	8	–	0
Wesley		–		1	–	8	–	0
^ – NCAA Division III playoff participant

The 1988 UC Santa Barbara Gauchos football team represented the University of California, Santa Barbara (UCSB) as an independent during the 1988 NCAA Division III football season. Led by third-year head coach Mike Warren, the Gauchos compiled a record of 6–4 and outscored their opponents 189 to 176 for the season. The team played home games at Harder Stadium in Santa Barbara, California.

== Schedule ==
Date	Opponent	Site	Result	Attendance	Source
September 10	at Cal State Hayward	Pioneer Stadium; Hayward, CA	L 7–21	300–350	
September 17	Chico State	Harder Stadium; Santa Barbara, CA	W 17–16	1,388	
September 24	San Francisco State	Harder Stadium; Santa Barbara, CA	W 16–6	4,260	
October 1	at Cal Lutheran	Mt. Clef Field; Thousand Oaks, CA	W 27–3	3,247	
October 8	Sonoma State	Harder Stadium; Santa Barbara, CA	L 18–20	2,459	
October 15	at Humboldt State	Redwood Bowl; Arcata, CA	W 31–21	1,200	
October 22	Saint Mary’s	Harder Stadium; Santa Barbara, CA	L 24–27	2,377	
October 29	at Azusa Pacific	Cougar Athletic Stadium; Azusa, CA	L 14–31	2,763	
November 5	at San Diego	Torero Stadium; San Diego, CA	W 13–10	4,000	
November 12	Western New Mexico	Harder Stadium; Santa Barbara, CA	W 22–21	5,443	
