= 1990 North Dakota State Bison football team =

American college football season

1990 North Dakota State Bison football

NCAA Division II champion NCC champion

NCAA Division II Championship Game, W 51–11 vs. IUP
- Conference: North Central Conference
- Record: 14–0 (9–0 NCC)
- Head coach: Rocky Hager (4th season)
- Home stadium: Dacotah Field

1990 North Central Conference football standings
| | Conf. | | | | | Overall |
| Team | W | | L | | T | W | | L | | T |
|---|---|---|---|---|---|---|---|---|---|---|
| No. 1 North Dakota State $^ | 9 | – | 0 | – | 0 | 14 | – | 0 | – | 0 |
| No. 12 North Dakota | 7 | – | 2 | – | 0 | 7 | – | 3 | – | 0 |
| No. T–20 Northern Colorado ^ | 6 | – | 3 | – | 0 | 7 | – | 4 | – | 0 |
| Augustana (SD) | 5 | – | 4 | – | 0 | 5 | – | 5 | – | 0 |
| Morningside | 5 | – | 4 | – | 0 | 7 | – | 4 | – | 0 |
| Mankato State | 4 | – | 5 | – | 0 | 5 | – | 6 | – | 0 |
| South Dakota | 3 | – | 6 | – | 0 | 4 | – | 7 | – | 0 |
| St. Cloud State | 3 | – | 6 | – | 0 | 4 | – | 7 | – | 0 |
| South Dakota State | 2 | – | 7 | – | 0 | 3 | – | 8 | – | 0 |
| Nebraska–Omaha | 1 | – | 8 | – | 0 | 2 | – | 9 | – | 0 |
$ – Conference champion; ^ – NCAA Division II playoff participant; Rankings from NCAA Division II Football Committee poll

The 1990 North Dakota State football team represented North Dakota State University during the 1990 NCAA Division II football season, and completed the 94th season of Bison football. The Bison played their home games at Dacotah Field in Fargo, North Dakota. The 1990 team came off an 8–3–1 record from the previous season. The team was led by coach Rocky Hager. The team finished the regular season with an undefeated 10–0 record and made the NCAA Division II playoffs. The Bison defeated IUP, 51–11, in the National Championship Game en route to the program's fifth NCAA Division II Football Championship.

== Schedule ==
| Date | Opponent | Rank | Site | Result | Attendance | Source |
|---|---|---|---|---|---|---|
| September 1 | No. 5 IUP* | No. 3 | Dacotah Field; Fargo, ND | W 28–18 | 11,778 | |
| September 15 | at Mankato State | No. 2 | Blakeslee Stadium; Mankato, MN | W 34–20 | 6,000 | |
| September 22 | South Dakota State | No. 1 | Dacotah Field; Fargo, ND (rivalry) | W 40–28 | 12,596 | |
| September 29 | at South Dakota | No. 1 | DakotaDome; Vermillion, SD | W 42–14 | 3,700 | |
| October 6 | Morningside^{†} | No. 1 | Dacotah Field; Fargo, ND | W 19–12 | 12,448 | |
| October 13 | at Northern Colorado | No. 1 | Jackson Field; Greeley, CO | W 34–17 | 8,378 | |
| October 20 | St. Cloud State | No. 1 | Dacotah Field; Fargo, ND | W 62–3 | 10,109 | |
| October 27 | at Augustana (SD) | No. 1 | Howard Wood Field; Sioux Falls, SD | W 43–14 | 2,800 | |
| November 3 | Nebraska–Omaha | No. 1 | Dacotah Field; Fargo, ND | W 44–7 | 8,320 | |
| November 10 | at No. 12 North Dakota | No. 1 | Memorial Stadium; Grand Forks, ND (Nickel Trophy) | W 42–14 | 12,400 | |
| November 17 | No. T–20 Northern Colorado | No. 1 | Dacotah Field; Fargo, ND (NCAA Division II First Round) | W 17–7 | 7,103 | |
| November 24 | No. 8 Cal Poly* | No. 1 | Dacotah Field; Fargo, ND (NCAA Division II Quarterfinal) | W 47–0 | 8,253 | |
| December 1 | No. 3 Pittsburg State* | No. 1 | Dacotah Field; Fargo, ND (NCAA Division II Semifinal) | W 39–29 | 9,086 | |
| December 8 | vs. No. 4 IUP* | No. 1 | Braly Municipal Stadium; Florence, AL (NCAA Division II Championship Game) | W 51–11 | 10,080 | |
*Non-conference game; ^{†}Homecoming; Rankings from NCAA Division II Football Committee Poll released prior to the game
