= Western Football Conference =

Western Football Conference may refer to:

- Canadian Football League West Division, one of the two regional divisions of the Canadian Football League
- Western Football Conference (United States), a now-defunct NCAA Division II college football conference

== See also ==
- Western football (disambiguation)
