= 1990 Sacramento State Hornets football team =

American college football season

1990 Sacramento State Hornets football
- Conference: Western Football Conference
- Record: 4–6 (1–4 WFC)
- Head coach: Bob Mattos (13th season)
- Home stadium: Hornet Stadium

1990 Western Football Conference standings
	Conf.					Overall
Team	W		L		T	W		L		T
No. 8 Cal Poly +^	4	–	1	–	0	10	–	2	–	0
No. 13 Cal State Northridge +^	4	–	1	–	0	7	–	4	–	0
Portland State	2	–	3	–	0	6	–	5	–	0
Santa Clara	2	–	3	–	0	6	–	5	–	0
Southern Utah State	2	–	3	–	0	6	–	5	–	0
Sacramento State	1	–	4	–	0	4	–	6	–	0
+ – Conference co-champions; ^ – NCAA Division II playoff participant; Rankings from NCAA Division II Football Committee poll

The 1990 Sacramento State Hornets football team represented California State University, Sacramento as a member of the Western Football Conference (WFC) during the 1990 NCAA Division II football season. Led by 13th-year head coach Bob Mattos, Sacramento State compiled an overall record of 4–6 with a mark of 1–4 in conference play, placing last out of six teams in the WFC. The team was outscored by its opponents 259 to 225 for the season. The Hornets played home games at Hornet Stadium in Sacramento, California.

== Schedule ==
Date	Opponent	Site	Result	Attendance	Source
September 1	West Texas State*	Charles C. Hughes Stadium; Sacramento, CA	W 22–9	1,700–2,356	
September 8	at Pacific (CA)*	Stagg Memorial Stadium; Stockton, CA	L 33–41	8,013	
September 15	at Nevada*	Mackay Stadium; Reno, NV	L 7–41	15,080	
September 22	No. 7 UC Davis*	Charles C. Hughes Stadium; Sacramento, CA (Causeway Classic)	W 16–12	15,400	
September 29	No. 15 Portland State	Charles C. Hughes Stadium; Sacramento, CA	L 24–41	1,750	
October 6	at Southern Utah State	Eccles Coliseum; Cedar City, UT	L 31–38	2,915	
October 13	at No. 7 Cal Poly	Mustang Stadium; San Luis Obispo, CA	W 20–17	6,375	
October 20	at No. 13 Cal State Northridge	North Campus Stadium; Northridge, CA	L 13–24	4,083	
October 27	Morris Brown	Hornet Stadium; Sacramento, CA	W 37–12	3,576	
November 3	Santa Clara	Hornet Stadium; Sacramento, CA	L 22–24	2,462	
*Non-conference game; Rankings from NCAA Division II Football Committee Poll released prior to the game
