= 1988 Sacramento State Hornets football team =

American college football season

1988 Sacramento State Hornets football

NCAA Division II Semifinal, L 20–42 vs. North Dakota State
- Conference: Western Football Conference
- Record: 10–3 (4–2 WFC)
- Head coach: Bob Mattos (11th season)
- Home stadium: Hornet Stadium

1988 Western Football Conference standings
	Conf.					Overall
Team	W		L		T	W		L		T
No. 4 Portland State $^	6	–	0	–	0	11	–	3	–	1
No. 10 Sacramento State ^	4	–	2	–	0	10	–	3	–	0
Santa Clara	4	–	2	–	0	7	–	4	–	0
Cal Poly	3	–	3	–	0	5	–	4	–	1
Cal State Northridge	2	–	4	–	0	6	–	5	–	0
Southern Utah State	2	–	4	–	0	4	–	7	–	0
Cal Lutheran	0	–	6	–	0	2	–	8	–	0
$ – Conference champion; ^ – NCAA Division II playoff participant; Rankings from NCAA Division II Football Committee poll

The 1988 Sacramento State Hornets football team represented California State University, Sacramento as a member of the Western Football Conference (WFC) during the 1988 NCAA Division II football season. Led by 11th-year head coach Bob Mattos, Sacramento State compiled an overall record of 10–3 with a mark of 4–2 in conference play, tying for second place in the WFC. The team outscored its opponents 479 to 272 for the season. The Hornets played home games at Hornet Stadium in Sacramento, California.

The Hornets finished the regular season schedule with a record of 8–2. For the first time they qualified for the NCAA Division II Football Championship playoffs. The first game was against traditional rival UC Davis, who they defeated 35–14. The Division II quarterfinal game was against North Carolina Central, and the Hornets dominated the game, 56–7. The Division II semifinal game was against undefeated North Central Conference champion North Dakota State. North Dakota State defeated the Hornets, 42–20, on their way to a national title.

Eight players Sacramento State received first-team All-WFC honors: wide receiver Mark Young, running back Donald Hair, center Harry Williams, kicker Jim Gill, defensive lineman Ken Stinnett, linebacker Derek Stigerts, defensive back JR Richards, and safety Gary Lunsford.

== Schedule ==
Date	Time	Opponent	Rank	Site	Result	Attendance	Source
September 10		at Chico State*		University Stadium; Chico, CA	W 48–16	3,500	
September 17		Humboldt State*		Hornet Stadium; Sacramento, CA	W 55–17	5,800	
September 24		at UC Davis*		Toomey Field; Davis, CA (Causeway Classic)	W 31–28	10,600	
October 1		at Southern Utah State	No. 10	Eccles Coliseum; Cedar City, UT	L 17–21	4,400	
October 8		at Cal Poly		Mustang Stadium; San Luis Obispo, CA	W 30–29	3,750	
October 15		Santa Clara	No. 15	Hornet Stadium; Sacramento, CA	W 28–14	4,500	
October 22		at Pacific (CA)*	No. 11	Stagg Memorial Stadium; Stockton, CA	W 30–21	5,147	
October 29		No. 5 Portland State	No. 6	Hornet Stadium; Sacramento, CA	L 29–43	8,300	
November 5		at Cal State Northridge	No. 12	North Campus Stadium; Northridge, CA	W 40–20	6,103–6,193	
November 12		Cal Lutheran	No. 10	Hornet Stadium; Sacramento, CA	W 60–0	4,200	
November 19	1:00 p.m.	at No. 13 UC Davis*	No. 10	Toomey Field; Davis, CA (NCAA Division II First Round)	W 35–14	10,700	
November 26		No. 17 North Carolina Central*	No. 10	Hornet Stadium; Sacramento, CA (NCAA Division II Quarterfinal)	W 56–7		
December 3		at No. 1 North Dakota State*	No. 10	Dacotah Field; Fargo, ND (NCAA Division II Semifinal)	L 20–42	13,200	
*Non-conference game; Rankings from NCAA Division II Football Committee Poll released prior to the game; All times are in Pacific time
