= 1990 Humboldt State Lumberjacks football team =

American college football season

1990 Humboldt State Lumberjacks football
- Conference: Northern California Athletic Conference
- Record: 2–8–1 (1–4 NCAC)
- Head coach: Mike Dolby (5th season)
- Home stadium: Redwood Bowl

1990 Northern California Athletic Conference football standings
	Conf.					Overall
Team	W		L		T	W		L		T
UC Davis $	5	–	0	–	0	7	–	3	–	0
Sonoma State	4	–	1	–	0	7	–	3	–	0
Chico State	3	–	2	–	0	4	–	6	–	0
San Francisco State	1	–	4	–	0	4	–	7	–	0
Humboldt State	1	–	4	–	0	2	–	8	–	1
Cal State Hayward	1	–	4	–	0	2	–	9	–	0
$ – Conference champion; The first Humboldt State vs. Cal State Hayward game did not count as a conference game.

The 1990 Humboldt State Lumberjacks football team represented Humboldt State University—now known as California State Polytechnic University, Humboldt—as a member of the Northern California Athletic Conference (NCAC) during the 1990 NCAA Division II football season. Led by Mike Dolby in his fifth and final season as head coach, the Lumberjacks compiled an overall record of 2–8–1 with a mark of 1–4 in conference play, placing in a three-way tie for fourth in the NCAC. The team was outscored by its opponents 340 to 205 for the season. Humboldt State played home games at the Redwood Bowl in Arcata, California.

In five years under Dolby, the Lumberjacks had a record of 18–33–2 (.358) and one winning season, in 1989.

== Schedule ==
Date	Opponent	Site	Result	Attendance	Source
September 1	at Cal State Hayward*	Pioneer Stadium; Hayward, CA	L 20–35	400–500	
September 8	Chico State	Redwood Bowl; Arcata, CA	L 21–45	3,400	
September 22	Minnesota Duluth*	Redwood Bowl; Arcata, CA	T 7–7	2,200	
September 29	at Azusa Pacific*	Cougar Athletic Stadium; Azusa, CA	L 17–19	1,000	
October 6	at Menlo*	Connor Field; Atherton, CA	W 33–26	200	
October 13	UC Davis	Redwood Bowl; Arcata, CA	L 22–45	3,150	
October 20	at Sonoma State	Cossacks Stadium (Note: Seawolf Stadium was known as Cossacks Stadium until 2002 when the University changed the mascot from Cossacks to Seawolves.); Rohnert Park, CA	L 0–43	1,102	
October 27	Cal State Hayward	Redwood Bowl; Arcata, CA	W 13–11	450–1,335	
November 3	at Saint Mary's*	Saint Mary's Stadium; Moraga, CA	L 21–26	2,555	
November 10	at San Francisco State	Cox Stadium; San Francisco, CA	L 15–38	1,735	
November 17	UC Santa Barbara*	Redwood Bowl; Arcata, CA	L 36–45	1,100	
*Non-conference game

== Team players in the NFL ==
The following Humboldt State players were selected in the 1991 NFL draft.

Round	Pick	Player	Position	NFL team
7	179	Scotty Reagan	Defensive tackle	Minnesota Vikings
