= 1990 Santa Clara Broncos football team =

American college football season

1990 Santa Clara Broncos football
- Conference: Western Football Conference
- Record: 6–5 (2–3 WFC)
- Head coach: Terry Malley (6th season)
- Home stadium: Buck Shaw Stadium

1990 Western Football Conference standings
	Conf.					Overall
Team	W		L		T	W		L		T
No. 8 Cal Poly +^	4	–	1	–	0	10	–	2	–	0
No. 13 Cal State Northridge +^	4	–	1	–	0	7	–	4	–	0
Portland State	2	–	3	–	0	6	–	5	–	0
Santa Clara	2	–	3	–	0	6	–	5	–	0
Southern Utah State	2	–	3	–	0	6	–	5	–	0
Sacramento State	1	–	4	–	0	4	–	6	–	0
+ – Conference co-champions; ^ – NCAA Division II playoff participant; Rankings from NCAA Division II Football Committee poll

The 1990 Santa Clara Broncos football team represented Santa Clara University as a member of the Western Football Conference (WFC) during the 1990 NCAA Division II football season. The Broncos were led by sixth-year head coach Terry Malley. They played home games at Buck Shaw Stadium in Santa Clara, California. Santa Clara finished the season with a record of six wins and five losses (6–5, 2–3 WFC). The Broncos outscored their opponents 251–231 for the season.

== Schedule ==
Date	Opponent	Rank	Site	Result	Attendance	Source
September 1	at Chico State*		University Stadium; Chico, CA	W 21–19	3,714–3,741	
September 8	UC Davis*		Buck Shaw Stadium; Santa Clara, CA	L 19–31	5,500	
September 15	San Francisco State*		Buck Shaw Stadium; Santa Clara, CA	W 28–10	6,231	
September 22	at Cal State Hayward*		Pioneer Stadium; Hayward, CA	W 50–20	750	
September 29	Southern Utah State		Buck Shaw Stadium; Santa Clara, CA	L 20–24	3,891	
October 6	at Cal Lutheran*		Mt. Clef Field; Thousand Oaks, CA	W 34–13	2,000	
October 13	at Portland State		Civic Stadium; Portland, OR	W 28–26	12,101	
October 20	No. 16 Cal Poly	No. 18	Buck Shaw Stadium; Santa Clara, CA	L 0–29	6,000	
October 27	No. 9 Cal State Northridge		Buck Shaw Stadium; Santa Clara, CA	L 7–10	3,000–5,000	
November 3	at Sacramento State		Hornet Stadium; Sacramento, CA	W 24–22	2,462	
November 10	at Saint Mary's*		Saint Mary's Stadium; Moraga, CA	L 20–27	5,000	
*Non-conference game; Rankings from NCAA Division II Football Committee Poll released prior to the game
