= 1988 Cal State Northridge Matadors football team =

American college football season

1988 Cal State Northridge Matadors football
- Conference: Western Football Conference
- Record: 6–5 (2–4 WFC)
- Head coach: Bob Burt (3rd season)
- Defensive coordinator: Mark Banker (6th season)
- Home stadium: North Campus Stadium

1988 Western Football Conference standings
	Conf.					Overall
Team	W		L		T	W		L		T
No. 4 Portland State $^	6	–	0	–	0	11	–	3	–	1
No. 10 Sacramento State ^	4	–	2	–	0	10	–	3	–	0
Santa Clara	4	–	2	–	0	7	–	4	–	0
Cal Poly	3	–	3	–	0	5	–	4	–	1
Cal State Northridge	2	–	4	–	0	6	–	5	–	0
Southern Utah State	2	–	4	–	0	4	–	7	–	0
Cal Lutheran	0	–	6	–	0	2	–	8	–	0
$ – Conference champion; ^ – NCAA Division II playoff participant; Rankings from NCAA Division II Football Committee poll

The 1988 Cal State Northridge Matadors football team represented California State University, Northridge as a member of the Western Football Conference (WFC) during the 1988 NCAA Division II football season. Led by third-year head coach Bob Burt, Cal State Northridge compiled an overall record of 6–5 with a mark of 2–4 in conference play, tying for fifth place in the WFC. The team outscored its opponents 269 to 268 for the season. The Matadors played home games at North Campus Stadium in Northridge, California.

== Schedule ==
Date	Opponent	Rank	Site	Result	Attendance	Source
September 3	Cal State Hayward*		North Campus Stadium; Northridge, CA	W 17–0	4,132–4,523	
September 10	at San Francisco State*		Cox Stadium; San Francisco, CA	W 48–0	300	
September 17	at Sonoma State*	No. 9	Cossacks Stadium; Rohnert Park, CA	W 31–6	1,242	
September 24	at Idaho State*	No. 6	ASISU Minidome; Pocatello, ID	W 34–23	5,868	
October 1	Cal Poly	No. 5	North Campus Stadium; Northridge, CA	L 7–38	5,925	
October 8	at Cal Lutheran	No. 12	Mt. Clef Field; Thousand Oaks, CA	W 24–21	2,107	
October 15	No. 11 Portland State	No. 6	North Campus Stadium; Northridge, CA	L 13–45	3,302	
October 22	UC Davis*		North Campus Stadium; Northridge, CA	L 13–31	4,015–4,051	
October 29	at Santa Clara		Buck Shaw Stadium; Santa Clara, CA	L 27–31	1,892	
November 5	No. 12 Sacramento State		North Campus Stadium; Northridge, CA	L 20–40	6,103–6,193	
November 12	at Southern Utah State		Eccles Coliseum; Cedar City, UT	W 35–33	3,527	
*Non-conference game; Rankings from NCAA Division II Football Committee Poll released prior to the game
