= 1990 UC Santa Barbara Gauchos football team =

American college football season

1990 UC Santa Barbara Gauchos football
- Conference: Independent
- Record: 6–4
- Head coach: Rick Candaele (1st season)
- Home stadium: Harder Stadium

1990 NCAA Division III independents football records
| | Conf. | | | Overall |
| Team | W | L | T | W | | L | | T |
|---|---|---|---|---|---|---|---|---|
| Hofstra ^ | | – | | 12 | – | 1 | – | 0 |
| Dayton ^ | | – | | 11 | – | 1 | – | 0 |
| Cortland ^ | | – | | 9 | – | 1 | – | 0 |
| Frostburg State | | – | | 9 | – | 1 | – | 0 |
| Union (NY) | | – | | 9 | – | 1 | – | 0 |
| Ferrum ^ | | – | | 8 | – | 2 | – | 0 |
| Ithaca ^ | | – | | 8 | – | 2 | – | 0 |
| Buffalo State | | – | | 7 | – | 2 | – | 0 |
| San Diego | | – | | 7 | – | 2 | – | 0 |
| Guilford | | – | | 7 | – | 3 | – | 0 |
| Bluffton | | – | | 6 | – | 3 | – | 0 |
| Gannon | | – | | 6 | – | 3 | – | 0 |
| Davidson | | – | | 5 | – | 3 | – | 0 |
| Menlo | | – | | 5 | – | 3 | – | 0 |
| Canisius | | – | | 6 | – | 4 | – | 0 |
| Drake | | – | | 6 | – | 4 | – | 0 |
| Quincy | | – | | 6 | – | 4 | – | 0 |
| UC Santa Barbara | | – | | 6 | – | 4 | – | 0 |
| Aurora | | – | | 5 | – | 4 | – | 0 |
| Catholic University | | – | | 5 | – | 5 | – | 0 |
| Georgetown | | – | | 5 | – | 5 | – | 0 |
| Maryville (TN) | | – | | 5 | – | 5 | – | 0 |
| Wagner | | – | | 5 | – | 5 | – | 0 |
| Wesley | | – | | 5 | – | 5 | – | 0 |
| Colorado College | | – | | 4 | – | 5 | – | 0 |
| Wilmington (OH) | | – | | 4 | – | 5 | – | 0 |
| Alfred | | – | | 4 | – | 6 | – | 0 |
| Thomas More | | – | | 3 | – | 6 | – | 0 |
| Albany | | – | | 3 | – | 7 | – | 0 |
| Brockport | | – | | 3 | – | 7 | – | 0 |
| Western Connecticut State | | – | | 3 | – | 7 | – | 0 |
| Buffalo | | – | | 2 | – | 8 | – | 0 |
| Duquesne | | – | | 1 | – | 8 | – | 1 |
| Mercyhurst | | – | | 1 | – | 8 | – | 0 |
| Norwich | | – | | 1 | – | 8 | – | 0 |
| Salisbury State | | – | | 1 | – | 8 | – | 0 |
| Southeastern Massachusetts | | – | | 1 | – | 8 | – | 0 |
| Saint Peter's | | – | | 0 | – | 7 | – | 0 |
| Fairleigh Dickinson–Florham | | – | | 0 | – | 9 | – | 0 |
| Kentucky Wesleyan | | – | | 0 | – | 10 | – | 0 |
| Methodist | | – | | 0 | – | 10 | – | 0 |
^ – NCAA Division III playoff participant

The 1990 UC Santa Barbara Gauchos football team represented the University of California, Santa Barbara (UCSB) as an independent during the 1990 NCAA Division III football season. Led by first-year head coach Rick Candaele, the Gauchos compiled a record of 6–4 and were outscored by their opponents 271 to 248 for the season. The team played home games at Harder Stadium in Santa Barbara, California.

== Schedule ==
| Date | Opponent | Site | Result | Attendance | Source |
|---|---|---|---|---|---|
| September 8 | Sonoma State | Harder Stadium; Santa Barbara, CA | L 10–42 | 1,687 | |
| September 15 | at Cal Lutheran | Mt. Clef Field; Thousand Oaks, CA | W 22–6 | 800–1,225 | |
| September 22 | Chico State | Harder Stadium; Santa Barbara, CA | W 31–7 | 2,128 | |
| September 29 | San Francisco State | Harder Stadium; Santa Barbara, CA | L 26–42 | 2,008 | |
| October 6 | at Cal State Hayward | Pioneer Stadium; Hayward, CA | W 37–19 | 350–650 | |
| October 13 | at San Diego | Torero Stadium; San Diego, CA | W 24–3 | 4,000 | |
| October 27 | Saint Mary's | Harder Stadium; Santa Barbara, CA | L 16–45 | 1,804 | |
| November 3 | at Azusa Pacific | Cougar Athletic Stadium; Azusa, CA | W 27–23 | 1,800–2,020 | |
| November 10 | Western New Mexico | Harder Stadium; Santa Barbara, CA | L 10–48 | 7,235 | |
| November 17 | at Humboldt State | Redwood Bowl; Arcata, CA | W 45–36 | 1,100 | |
