= 1988 UC Davis Aggies football team =

American college football season

1988 UC Davis Aggies football

NCAC champion

NCAA Division II First Round, L 14–35 vs. Sacramento State
- Conference: Northern California Athletic Conference
- Record: 7–3–1 (5–0 NCAC)
- Head coach: Jim Sochor (19th season)
- Home stadium: Toomey Field

1988 Northern California Athletic Conference football standings
	Conf.					Overall
Team	W		L		T	W		L		T
No. 13 UC Davis $^	5	–	0	–	0	7	–	3	–	1
Sonoma State	3	–	2	–	0	5	–	5	–	0
Chico State	3	–	2	–	0	3	–	7	–	0
Humboldt State	2	–	3	–	0	4	–	6	–	0
Cal State Hayward	1	–	4	–	0	2	–	9	–	0
San Francisco State	1	–	4	–	0	1	–	9	–	0
$ – Conference champion; ^ – NCAA Division II playoff participant; Rankings from NCAA Division II Football Committee poll

The 1988 UC Davis football team represented the University of California, Davis as a member of the Northern California Athletic Conference (NCAC) during the 1988 NCAA Division II football season. Led by Jim Sochor in his 19th and final season, UC Davis compiled an overall record of 7–3–1 with a mark of 5–0 in conference play, winning the NCAC for the 18th title consecutive season. 1988 was the team's 19th consecutive winning season. With the 5–0 conference record, the team stretched their conference winning streak to 41 games dating back to the 1981 season. The Aggies were ranked No. 13 in the final NCAA Division II poll. They advanced to the NCAA Division II Football Championship playoffs, where they lost to Sacramento State in the first round. The team outscored its opponents 300 to 180 for the season. The Aggies played home games at Toomey Field in Davis, California.

Sochor's career at UC Davis was remarkable in its success. His teams won the conference championship in 18 of his 19 years, including 18 straight from 1971 to 1988, and reached the postseason in nine seasons. His teams had a winning record in all 19 seasons, compiling an overall record of 156–41–5, for a .785 winning percentage. In conference play under Sochor, UC Davis was 92–6, for a .939 winning percentage. Sochor was inducted into the College Football Hall of Fame in 1999.

== Schedule ==
Date	Time	Opponent	Rank	Site	Result	Attendance	Source
September 10		at Santa Clara*		Buck Shaw Stadium; Santa Clara, CA	W 21–10	6,823	
September 17		No. T–18 (I-AA) Nevada*		Toomey Field; Davis, CA	L 16–28	8,400	
September 24		Sacramento State*		Toomey Field; Davis, CA (Causeway Classic)	L 28–31	10,600	
October 1		at San Francisco State		Cox Stadium; San Francisco, CA	W 35–0	300–500	
October 8		at Cal State Hayward		Pioneer Stadium; Hayward, CA	W 30–14	1,300	
October 15		Sonoma State		Toomey Field; Davis, CA	W 42–13	4,700	
October 22		at Cal State Northridge*		North Campus Stadium; Northridge, CA	W 31–13	4,015	
October 29		Cal Poly*	No. 17	Toomey Field; Davis, CA (rivalry)	T 21–21	8,400	
November 5		at Humboldt State	No. 15	Redwood Bowl; Arcata, CA	W 26–2	800	
November 12		Chico State	No. 13	Toomey Field; Davis, CA	W 36–13	7,400	
November 19	1:00 p.m.	No. 10 Scaramento State*	No. 13	Toomey Field; Davis, CA (NCAA Division II First Round)	L 14–35	10,700	
*Non-conference game; Rankings from NCAA Division II Football Committee Poll released prior to the game; All times are in Pacific time
