= 1990 Cal State Northridge Matadors football team =

American college football season

1990 Cal State Northridge Matadors football

WFC co-champion

NCAA Division II First Round Round, L 7–14 vs. Cal Poly
- Conference: Western Football Conference
- Record: 7–4 (4–1 WFC)
- Head coach: Bob Burt (5th season)
- Defensive coordinator: Mark Banker (8th season)
- Home stadium: North Campus Stadium

1990 Western Football Conference standings
	Conf.					Overall
Team	W		L		T	W		L		T
No. 8 Cal Poly +^	4	–	1	–	0	10	–	2	–	0
No. 13 Cal State Northridge +^	4	–	1	–	0	7	–	4	–	0
Portland State	2	–	3	–	0	6	–	5	–	0
Santa Clara	2	–	3	–	0	6	–	5	–	0
Southern Utah State	2	–	3	–	0	6	–	5	–	0
Sacramento State	1	–	4	–	0	4	–	6	–	0
+ – Conference co-champions; ^ – NCAA Division II playoff participant; Rankings from NCAA Division II Football Committee poll

The 1990 Cal State Northridge Matadors football team represented California State University, Northridge as a member of the Western Football Conference (WFC) during the 1990 NCAA Division II football season. Led by fifth-year head coach Bob Burt, Cal State Northridge compiled an overall record of 7–4 with a mark of 4–1 in conference play, sharing the WFC title Cal Poly. The Matadors advanced to the NCAA Division II Football Championship playoffs for the first time in program history, losing in the first round to Cal Poly in a rematch of the WFC co-champions. The team was outscored by its opponents 179 to 173 for the season. The Matadors played home games at North Campus Stadium in Northridge, California.

== Schedule ==
Date	Opponent	Rank	Site	Result	Attendance	Source
September 1	at Northern Arizona*		Walkup Skydome; Flagstaff, AZ	L 3–37	6,439–6,449	
September 8	Eastern New Mexico*		North Campus Stadium; Northridge, CA	W 24–13	2,864	
September 22	at Central State (OK)*		Wantland Stadium; Edmond, OK	W 17–6	3,800	
September 29	UC Davis*		North Campus Stadium; Northridge, CA	W 14–10	3,806	
October 6	Portland State	No. 18	North Campus Stadium; Northridge, CA	W 19–18	3,131	
October 13	at Southern Utah State	No. 15	Eccles Coliseum; Cedar City, UT	W 34–24	5,122	
October 20	Sacramento State	No. 13	North Campus Stadium; Northridge, CA	W 24–13	4,083	
October 27	at Santa Clara	No. 9	Buck Shaw Stadium; Santa Clara, CA	W 10–7	3,000–5,000	
November 3	No. 10 Cal Poly	No. 7	North Campus Stadium; Northridge, CA	L 3–6	7,127	
November 10	at Long Beach State*	No. 13	Veterans Stadium; ong Beach, CA	L 24–25	3,090	
November 17	at No. 8 Cal Poly*	No. 13	Mustang Stadium; San Luis Obispo, CA (NCAA Division II First Round Round)	L 7–14		
*Non-conference game; Rankings from NCAA Division II Football Committee Poll released prior to the game

== Team players in the NFL ==
No Cal State Northridge players were selected in the 1991 NFL draft.

The following finished their college career in 1990 were not drafted, but played in the NFL.

Player	Position	First NFL team
Daved Benefield	Linebacker	1996 San Francisco 49ers
