= 1990 East Texas State Lions football team =

American college football season

1990 East Texas State Lions football

LSC champion

NCAA Division II Quarterfinal, L 28–60 at Pittsburg State
- Conference: Lone Star Conference
- Record: 10–3 (7–0 LSC)
- Head coach: Eddie Vowell (5th season)
- Defensive coordinator: Mark Copeland
- Home stadium: Memorial Stadium

1990 Lone Star Conference football standings
	Conf.					Overall
Team	W		L		T	W		L		T
No. 7 East Texas State $^	7	–	0	–	0	10	–	3	–	0
Angelo State	5	–	2	–	0	7	–	3	–	0
Eastern New Mexico	5	–	2	–	0	6	–	4	–	0
Texas A&I	5	–	2	–	0	6	–	4	–	0
Central State (OK)	3	–	4	–	0	4	–	6	–	0
Cameron	1	–	6	–	0	2	–	8	–	0
Abilene Christian	1	–	6	–	0	1	–	9	–	0
West Texas State	1	–	6	–	0	1	–	10	–	0
$ – Conference champion; ^ – NCAA Division II playoff participant; Rankings from NCAA Division II Football Committee poll

The 1990 East Texas State Lions football team represented East Texas State University—now known as Texas A&M University–Commerce—as a member of the Lone Star Conference (LSC) during the 1990 NCAA Division II football season. Led by fifth-year head coach Eddie Vowell, the Lions compiled an overall record of 10–3 with a mark of 7–0 in conference play, winning the LSC title for the first time since 1983. East Texas advanced to the NCAA Division II Football Championship playoffs, where they beat Grand Valley State in the first round before falling to Pittsburg State in the quarterfinals. The team played its home games at Memorial Stadium in Commerce, Texas. Wide receiver Gary Compton was a Harlon Hill Trophy nominee.

== Schedule ==
Date	Opponent	Rank	Site	Result	Attendance	Source
September 1	Livingston*		Memorial Stadium; Commerce, TX	W 45–6	1,500	
September 8	East Central*		Memorial Stadium; Commerce, TX	W 59–6	2,200	
September 15	at Southern Arkansas*	No. 12	Wilkins Stadium; Magnolia, AR	L 17–22	4,000	
September 22	at Northwestern State*		Harry Turpin Stadium; Natchitoches, LA	L 17–24	10,400	
September 29	at Central State (OK)		Wantland Stadium; Edmond, OK	W 17–10	1,200	
October 6	Texas A&I	No. 20	Memorial Stadium; Commerce, TX	W 26–6	2,800	
October 13	at West Texas State	No. 16	Kimbrough Memorial Stadium; Canyon, TX	W 51–35	5,110	
October 20	Eastern New Mexico	No. 14	Memorial Stadium; Commerce, TX	W 19–0	3,800	
October 27	at Abilene Christian	No. 10	Shotwell Stadium; Abilene, TX	W 63–34	7,500	
November 3	No. 15 Angelo State	No. 9	Memorial Stadium; Commerce, TX	W 42–7	8,500	
November 10	at Cameron	No. 7	Cameron Stadium; Lawton, OK	W 59–0	4,500	
November 17	at No. 6 Grand Valley State	No. 7	Lubbers Stadium; Allendale, MI (NCAA Division II First Round)	W 20–14	3,103	
November 24	at No. 3 Pittsburg State	No. 7	Carnie Smith Stadium; Pittsburg, KS (NCAA Division II Quarterfinal)	L 28–60		
*Non-conference game; Rankings from NCAA Division II Football Committee Poll released prior to the game

== Awards ==
Harlon Hill Trophy Nominee: Gary Compton

=== All-Americans ===
- Terry Bagsby, Defensive End, First Team
- Dwayne Phorne, Offensive Line, Second Team
- Eric Turner, Defensive Back, Second Team

== All-Lone Star Conference ==
=== LSC Superlatives ===
- Coach of The Year: Eddie Vowell
- Defensive Player of the Year: Terry Bagsby
- Outstanding Lineman of The Year: Terry Bagsby
- Offensive Back of the Year: Bobby Bounds
- Outstanding Back of the Year: Gary Compton

=== LSC First Team ===
- Terry Bagsby, Defensive End
- Bob Bounds, Quarterback
- Gary Compton, Tight End/Wide Receiver
- Jimmy Hooker, Safety
- Dwayne Phorne, Offensive Tackle
- Chad Turner, Linebacker
- Eric Turner, Cornerback
- Billy Watkins, Placekicker
- Jim White, Offensive Center

=== LSC Second Team ===
- Micah Haley, Defensive Line
- Don Madden, Offensive Guard
- Gary Perry, Running Back

=== LSC Honorable Mention ===
- Brian Harp, Wide Receiver
- Lance Hyder, Defensive End
- Willie Mozeke, Running Back
- Joseph Showell, Offensive Tackle
- Finis Turner, Safety
