= 1990 Sonoma State Cossacks football team =

American college football season

1990 Sonoma State Cossacks football
- Conference: Northern California Athletic Conference
- Record: 7–3 (4–1 NCAC)
- Head coach: Tim Walsh (2nd season)
- Defensive coordinator: Gary Patterson (2nd season)
- Home stadium: Cossacks Stadium

1990 Northern California Athletic Conference football standings
	Conf.					Overall
Team	W		L		T	W		L		T
UC Davis $	5	–	0	–	0	7	–	3	–	0
Sonoma State	4	–	1	–	0	7	–	3	–	0
Chico State	3	–	2	–	0	4	–	6	–	0
San Francisco State	1	–	4	–	0	4	–	7	–	0
Humboldt State	1	–	4	–	0	2	–	8	–	1
Cal State Hayward	1	–	4	–	0	2	–	9	–	0
$ – Conference champion; The first Humboldt State vs. Cal State Hayward game did not count as a conference game.

The 1990 Sonoma State Cossacks football team represented Sonoma State University as a member of the Northern California Athletic Conference (NCAC) during the 1990 NCAA Division II football season. Led by second-year head coach Tim Walsh, Sonoma State compiled an overall record of 7–3 with a mark of 4–1 in conference play, placing second in the NCAC. The team outscored its opponents 290 to 156 for the season. The Cossacks played home games at Cossacks Stadium (Note: Cossacks Stadium was renamed in 2002 to Seawolf Stadium when the University changed the name of the mascot to Seawolves.) in Rohnert Park, California.

== Schedule ==
Date	Opponent	Rank	Site	Result	Attendance	Source
September 1	at Cal State Fullerton*		Santa Ana Stadium; Santa Ana, CA	L 24–38	2,091	
September 8	at UC Santa Barbara*		Harder Stadium; Santa Barbara, CA	W 42–10	1,687	
September 15	at Cal Poly*		Mustang Stadium; San Luis Obispo, CA	L 7–32	5,239	
September 29	at Cal Lutheran*		Mt. Clef Field; Thousand Oaks, CA	W 24–2	1,750	
October 6	at Saint Mary's*		Saint Mary's Stadium; Moraga, CA	W 45–25	2,225	
October 13	Cal State Hayward		Cossacks Stadium; Rohnert Park, CA	W 38–3	850–1,783	
October 20	Humboldt State		Cossacks Stadium; Rohnert Park, CA	W 43–0	1,102	
October 27	at Chico State	No. T–20	University Stadium; Chico, CA	W 27–17	4,857	
November 3	San Francisco State	No. T–16	Cossacks Stadium; Rohnert Park, CA	W 33–17	1,288	
November 10	at UC Davis	No. 16	Toomey Field; Davis, CA	L 7–12	8,600	
*Non-conference game; Rankings from NCAA Division II Football Committee Poll released prior to the game
