= 1990 Jacksonville State Gamecocks football team =

American college football season

1990 Jacksonville State Gamecocks football

NCAA Division II Quarterfinal, L 7–14 at Mississippi College
- Conference: Gulf South Conference
- Record: 9–3 (6–2 GSC)
- Head coach: Bill Burgess (6th season)
- Offensive coordinator: Charles Maniscalco (6th season)
- Defensive coordinator: Eddie Garfinkle (5th season)
- Home stadium: Paul Snow Stadium

1990 Gulf South Conference football standings
	Conf.					Overall
Team	W		L		T	W		L		T
No. 2 Mississippi College $^	8	–	0	–	0	11	–	2	–	0
No. 10 Jacksonville State ^	6	–	2	–	0	9	–	3	–	0
No. 15 North Alabama ^	6	–	2	–	0	8	–	3	–	0
Valdosta State	5	–	3	–	0	5	–	5	–	0
Delta State	4	–	4	–	0	5	–	5	–	0
Troy State	4	–	4	–	0	5	–	5	–	0
Tennessee–Martin	2	–	6	–	0	0	–	4	–	7
Livingston	1	–	7	–	0	0	–	3	–	9
West Georgia	0	–	8	–	0	1	–	10	–	0
$ – Conference champion; ^ – NCAA Division II playoff participant; Rankings from NCAA Division II Football Committee poll

The 1990 Jacksonville State Gamecocks football team represented Jacksonville State University as a member of the Gulf South Conference (GSC) during the 1990 NCAA Division II football season. Led by sixth-year head coach Bill Burgess, the Gamecocks compiled an overall record of 9–3 with a mark of 6–2 in conference play, and finished second in the GSC. For the third consecutive season, Jacksonville State advanced to the NCAA Division II Football Championship playoffs, beating North Alabama in the first round before losing to Mississippi College in the quarterfinals.

== Schedule ==
Date	Opponent	Rank	Site	Result	Attendance	Source
September 8	at Alabama A&M*		Milton Frank Stadium; Huntsville, AL	W 27–7	11,500	
September 15	West Georgia	No. 3	Paul Snow Stadium; Jacksonville, AL	W 44–9	15,000	
September 22	at Valdosta State	No. 3	Cleveland Field; Valdosta, GA	L 17–18	5,213	
September 29	No. 2 Mississippi College	No. 9	Paul Snow Stadium; Jacksonville, AL	L 7–17	15,000	
October 6	at Delta State		Delta Field; Cleveland, MS	W 17–13	1,750	
October 13	No. 14 North Alabama		Paul Snow Stadium; Jacksonville, AL	W 41–25	14,000	
October 20	at Tennessee–Martin	No. 20	Pacer Stadium; Martin, TN	W 21–7	3,934	
October 27	at No. 8 Wofford*	No. 13	Snyder Field; Spartanburg, SC	W 21–7	6,796	
November 3	Troy State	No. 12	Paul Snow Stadium; Jacksonville, AL (rivalry)	W 21–10	15,500	
November 10	at Livingston	No. 10	Tiger Stadium; Livingston, AL	W 31–9	5,000	
November 17	No. 15 North Alabama*	No. 10	Paul Snow Stadium; Jacksonville, AL (NCAA Division II First Round)	W 38–14	5,000	
November 24	at No. 2 Mississippi College*	No. 10	Robinson-Hale Stadium; Clinton, MS (NCAA Division II Quarterfinal)	L 7–14	5,100	
*Non-conference game; Rankings from NCAA Division II Football Committee Poll released prior to the game
