= 1990 Cal State Hayward Pioneers football team =

American college football season

1990 Cal State Hayward Pioneers football
- Conference: Northern California Athletic Conference
- Record: 2–9 (1–4 NCAC)
- Head coach: Tim Tierney (16th season)
- Home stadium: Pioneer Stadium

1990 Northern California Athletic Conference football standings
	Conf.					Overall
Team	W		L		T	W		L		T
UC Davis $	5	–	0	–	0	7	–	3	–	0
Sonoma State	4	–	1	–	0	7	–	3	–	0
Chico State	3	–	2	–	0	4	–	6	–	0
San Francisco State	1	–	4	–	0	4	–	7	–	0
Humboldt State	1	–	4	–	0	2	–	8	–	1
Cal State Hayward	1	–	4	–	0	2	–	9	–	0
$ – Conference champion; The first Humboldt State vs. Cal State Hayward game did not count as a conference game.

The 1990 Cal State Hayward Pioneers football team represented California State University, Hayward—now known as California State University, East Bay—as a member of the Northern California Athletic Conference (NCAC) during the 1990 NCAA Division II football season. Led by 16th-year head coach Tim Tierney, Cal State Hayward compiled an overall record of 2–9 with a mark of 1–4 in conference play, placing in a three-way tie for fourth in the NCAC. The team was outscored by its opponents 326 to 159 for the season. The Pioneers played home games at Pioneer Stadium in Hayward, California.

== Schedule ==
Date	Opponent	Site	Result	Attendance	Source
September 1	Humboldt State*	Pioneer Stadium; Hayward, CA	W 35–20	400–500	
September 8	Saint Mary's*	Pioneer Stadium; Hayward, CA	L 8–26	800	
September 15	at Menlo*	Connor Field; Atherton, CA	L 7–9	300	
September 22	Santa Clara*	Pioneer Stadium; Hayward, CA	L 20–50	750	
September 29	Cal Poly*	Pioneer Stadium; Hayward, CA	L 16–35	500–1,555	
October 6	UC Santa Barbara*	Pioneer Stadium; Hayward, CA	L 19–37	350–650	
October 13	at Sonoma State	Cossacks Stadium (Note: Seawolf Stadium was known as Cossacks Stadium until 2002 when the University changed the mascot from Cossacks to Seawolves.); Rohnert Park, CA	L 3–38	850–1,783	
October 20	San Francisco State	Pioneer Stadium; Hayward, CA	W 19–13	1,000–1,400	
October 27	at Humboldt State	Redwood Bowl; Arcata, CA	L 11–13	450–1,335	
November 3	UC Davis	Pioneer Stadium; Hayward, CA	L 7–38	1,300–2,000	
November 10	at Chico State	University Stadium; Chico, CA	L 14–47	850–2,372	
*Non-conference game
