= Western football =

Western football may refer to:

== Association football ==
- Western Football Association, a historical governing body of association football in Ontario, Canada
- Western Football League, an association football league in South West England

== Gridiron football ==
=== Organizations ===
- Western Football Conference (United States), a now-defunct NCAA Division II college football conference
- West Division (CFL), one of the two regional divisions of the Canadian Football League
- AFC West, one of four divisions of the American Conference of the National Football League
- NFC West, one of four divisions of the National Conference of the National Football League

=== Teams ===
- Western Carolina Catamounts football, an American football university team
- Western Colorado Mountaineers, an American football university team
- Western Connecticut Wolves football, an American football university team
- Western Kentucky Hilltoppers football, an American football university team
- Western Michigan Broncos football, an American football university team
- Missouri Western Griffons football, an American football university team
- Western Mustangs football, a Canadian football university team

=== Other ===
- Hardy Trophy, the Canadian football championship of the Canada West Universities Athletic Association
