= 1990 NCAA Division II football rankings =

The 1990 NCAA Division II football rankings are from the NCAA Division II football committee. This is for the 1990 season.

== Legend ==
	Increase in ranking
	Decrease in ranking
	Not ranked previous week
(#–#)	Win–loss record
(Italics)	Number of first place votes
т	Tied with team above or below also with this symbol

== NCAA Division II Football Committee poll ==
	Preseason (Note: There was a preseason poll released in late August 1990. However, a copy has not been found so the known rankings have been filled in from other available information.)	Week 1 Sept 11	Week 2 Sept 18	Week 3 Sept 25	Week 4 Oct 1	Week 5 Oct 8	Week 6 Oct 15	Week 7 Oct 22	Week 8 Oct 29	Week 9 Nov 5	
1.	Mississippi College	Mississippi College (1–0) (4)	North Dakota State (2–0) (4)	North Dakota State (3–0) (4)	North Dakota State (4–0) (4)	North Dakota State (5–0) (4)	North Dakota State (6–0) (4)	North Dakota State (7–0) (4)	North Dakota State (8–0) (4)	North Dakota State (9–0) (4)	1.
2.	Texas A&I	North Dakota State (1–0)	Mississippi College (1–1)	Mississippi College (2–1)	Mississippi College (3–1)	Mississippi College (4–1)	Mississippi College (5–1)	Mississippi College (6–1)	Mississippi College (7–1)	Mississippi College (8–1)	2.
3.	North Dakota State	Jacksonville State (1–0)	Jacksonville State (2–0)	Grand Valley State (4–0)	Grand Valley State (5–0)	Grand Valley State (6–0)	Grand Valley State (7–0)	Grand Valley State (8–0)	Pittsburg State (9–0)	Pittsburg State (9–0)	3.
4.	Jacksonville State	Angelo State (2–0)	Portland State (3–0)	Pittsburg State (4–0)	Pittsburg State (5–0)	Pittsburg State (6–0)	Pittsburg State (7–0)	Pittsburg State (8–0)	IUP (7–1)	IUP (8–1)	4.
5.	IUP (Note: In the actual printed polls, IUP was listed as Indiana (PA))	Portland State (2–0)	Grand Valley State (3–0)	IUP (2–1)	IUP (3–1)	IUP (4–1)	IUP (5–1)	IUP (6–1)	Virginia Union (9–0)	Virginia Union (10–0)	5.
6.	Portland State	Grand Valley State (2–0)	Pittsburg State (3–0)	Angelo State (2–1)	Angelo State (3–1)	Tuskegee (6–0)	Tuskegee (7–0)	Virginia Union (8–0)	Edinboro (7–1)	Grand Valley State (9–1)	6.
7.	Angelo State	Pittsburg State (2–0)	UC Davis (2–0)	Tuskegee (4–0)	Tuskegee (5–0)	Cal Poly (5–0)	Virginia Union (7–0)	Edinboro (6–1)	Cal State Northridge (7–1)	East Texas State (8–2)	7.
8.	Edinboro	UC Davis (1–0)	IUP (1–1)	Cal Poly (3–0)	Cal Poly (4–0)	Virginia Union (6–0)	Edinboro (5–1)	Wofford (8–0)	Grand Valley State (8–1)	Cal Poly (8–1)	8.
9.	Grand Valley State	West Chester (1–0)	Angelo State (2–1)	Jacksonville State (2–1)	Virginia Union (5–0)	Edinboro (4–1)	Ashland (6–0–1)	Cal State Northridge (6–1)	East Texas State (7–2)	Northeast Missouri State (8–1)	9.
10.	UC Davis	IUP (1–1)	New Haven (2–0)	Virginia Union (4–0)	Edinboro (3–1)	Ashland (5–0–1)	North Dakota (5–1)	East Texas State (6–2)	Cal Poly (7–1)	Jacksonville State (7–2)	10.
11.		New Haven (1–0)	Tuskegee (3–0)	Northern Michigan (4–0)	Portland State (4–1)	Wofford (6–0)	Valdosta State (5–1)	Cal Poly (6–1)	Northeast Missouri State (7–1)	Edinboro (7–2)	11.
12.		East Texas State (2–0)	Virginia Union (3–0)	Norfolk State (4–0)	Wofford (5–0)	North Dakota (4–1)	Wofford (7–0)	Northeast Missouri State (6–1)	Jacksonville State (6–2)	North Dakota (7–2)	12.
13.		Tuskegee (2–0)	Northern Michigan (3–0)	Wofford (4–0)	Ashland (4–0–1)	Valdosta State (4–1)	Cal State Northridge (5–1)	Jacksonville State (5–2)	North Dakota (6–2)	Cal State Northridge (7–2)	13.
14.	West Chester	Wayne State (2–0)	Wofford (3–0)	Morningside (4–0)	Northern Michigan (4–0–1)	North Alabama (4–1)	East Texas State (5–2)	Millersville (6–1)	Tuskegee (8–1)	Tuskegee (9–1)	14.
15.		Virginia Union (2–0)	Norfolk State (3–0)	Edinboro (2–1) т	Manual (3–1)	Cal State Northridge (4–1)	Norfolk State (6–1)	Ashland (6–1–1)	Angelo State (6–2)	North Alabama (7–2)	15.
16.		Ashland (2–0)	Morningside (3–0)	Portland State (3–1) т	Valdosta State (3–1)	East Texas State (4–2)	Cal Poly (5–1)	Valdosta State (5–2)	Sonoma State (6–2) т	Sonoma State (7–2)	16.
17.		Wofford (2–0)	Edinboro (1–1)	Ashland (3–0–1)	North Alabama (3–1)	New Haven (4–1)	Northeast Missouri State (5–1)	North Alabama (5–2)	American International (6–2) т	American International (7–2)	17.
18.		Southeast Missouri State (2–0)	Ashland (2–0–1)	North Alabama (3–1)	Cal State Northridge (3–1) т (Note: In the actual printed polls, Cal State Northridge was listed as Northridge State)	Norfolk State (5–1)	Santa Clara (5–2)	Tuskegee (7–1)	North Alabama (6–2)	Wofford (9–1)	18.
19.		Edinboro (1–1) т	Cal Poly (2–0) т (Note: In the actual printed polls, Cal Poly was listed as Cal Poly at San Luis Obispo)	UC Davis (2–1)	New Haven (3–1) т	Northeast Missouri State (5–1)	Millersville (5–1)	Norfolk State (6–2)	New Haven (6–2)	New Haven (7–2)	19.
20.		Sacramento State (1–1) т	Delta State (1–1)	Virginia State (3–1)	East Texas State (3–2)	Morningside (4–2)	Jacksonville State (4–2)	Angelo State (5–2) т	Valdosta State (5–3)	Ashland (7–2–1) т	20.
21.								Sonoma State (5–2) т		Northern Colorado (6–3) т	21.
	Preseason (Note: There was a preseason poll released in late August 1990. However, a copy has not been found so the known rankings have been filled in from other available information.)	Week 1 Sept 11	Week 2 Sept 18	Week 3 Sept 25	Week 4 Oct 1	Week 5 Oct 8	Week 6 Oct 15	Week 7 Oct 22	Week 8 Oct 29	Week 9 Nov 5	
		Dropped: 2 Texas A&I	Dropped: 9 West Chester; 12 East Texas State; 14 Wayne State; 18 Southeast Missouri State; 20 Sacramento State	Dropped: 10 New Haven; 20 Delta State	Dropped: 9 Jacksonville State; 12 Norfolk State; 14 Morningside; 19 UC Davis; 20 Virginia State	Dropped: 6 Angelo State; 11 Portland State; 14 Northern Michigan	Dropped: 14 North Alabama; 17 New Haven; 20 Morningside	Dropped: 10 North Dakota; 18 Santa Clara	Dropped: 8 Wofford; 14 Millersville; 15 Ashland; 19 Norfolk State	Dropped: 15 Angelo State; 20 Valdosta State	
