= 1990 NCAA Division II football season =

American college football season

- Regular season: August – November 1990
- Playoffs: November 17 – December 8, 1990
- National Championship: Braly Municipal Stadium; Florence, AL
- Champion: North Dakota State (5)
- Harlon Hill Trophy: Chris Simdorn, North Dakota State

The 1990 NCAA Division II football season, part of college football in the United States organized by the National Collegiate Athletic Association at the Division II level, began in August 1990, and concluded with the NCAA Division II Football Championship on December 8, 1990, at Braly Municipal Stadium in Florence, Alabama, hosted by the University of North Alabama. The North Dakota State Bison defeated IUP, 51–11, to win their fifth Division II national title.

The Harlon Hill Trophy was awarded to Chris Simdorn, quarterback from North Dakota State.

== Conference and program changes ==
- One program departed Division II for Division I-AA prior to the season.
- The Midwest Intercollegiate Football Conference (MIFC) was founded prior to the season by the football-playing members of the Great Lakes Intercollegiate Athletic Conference (six teams) and the Heartland Collegiate Conference (five teams). The GLIAC abandoned its sponsorship of football and the Heartland disbanded.

School	1989 Conference	1990 Conference
Ashland	Heartland	MIFC
Butler	Heartland	MIFC
Cal Lutheran	Western	D-II Independent
Central Florida	D-II Independent	I-AA Independent
Ferris State	GLIAC	MIFC
Grand Valley State	GLIAC	MIFC
Hillsdale	GLIAC	MIFC
Indianapolis	Heartland	MIFC
Kearney State	RMAC (NAIA)	Independent (D-II)
Knoxville	SIAC	Independent (NAIA)
Lincoln (MO)	MIAA	Dropped Program
Northern Michigan	GLIAC	MIFC
Saginaw Valley State	GLIAC	MIFC
Saint Joseph's (IN)	Heartland	MIFC
Valparaiso	Heartland	MIFC
Wayne State (MI)	GLIAC	MIFC
Wayne State (NE)	RMAC (NAIA)	Independent (D-II)

== Conference standings ==
1990 Central Intercollegiate Athletic Association football standings
	Conf.					Overall
Team	W		L		T	W		L		T
Northern Division
No. 5 Virginia Union xy^	7	–	0	–	0	10	–	2	–	0
Norfolk State	5	–	1	–	0	7	–	3	–	0
Hampton	3	–	3	–	0	5	–	5	–	0
Virginia State	3	–	3	–	0	5	–	5	–	0
Elizabeth City State	2	–	4	–	0	3	–	6	–	1
Bowie State	2	–	4	–	0	3	–	6	–	0
Southern Division
Winston-Salem State xy$^	4	–	1	–	0	7	–	4	–	1
Fayetteville State	2	–	4	–	0	3	–	6	–	0
Livingstone	2	–	4	–	0	3	–	6	–	0
North Carolina Central	2	–	4	–	0	3	–	7	–	0
Johnson C. Smith	0	–	6	–	0	0	–	9	–	0
Championship: Winston-Salem State 34, Virginia Union 21
$ – Conference champion; x – Division champion/co-champions; y – Championship game participant; ^ – NCAA Division II playoff participant; Rankings from NCAA Division II Football Committee poll

1990 Gulf South Conference football standings
	Conf.					Overall
Team	W		L		T	W		L		T
No. 2 Mississippi College $^	8	–	0	–	0	11	–	2	–	0
No. 10 Jacksonville State ^	6	–	2	–	0	9	–	3	–	0
No. 15 North Alabama ^	6	–	2	–	0	8	–	3	–	0
Valdosta State	5	–	3	–	0	5	–	5	–	0
Delta State	4	–	4	–	0	5	–	5	–	0
Troy State	4	–	4	–	0	5	–	5	–	0
Tennessee–Martin	2	–	6	–	0	4	–	7	–	0
Livingston	1	–	7	–	0	3	–	9	–	0
West Georgia	0	–	8	–	0	1	–	10	–	0
$ – Conference champion; ^ – NCAA Division II playoff participant; Rankings from NCAA Division II Football Committee poll

1990 Lone Star Conference football standings
	Conf.					Overall
Team	W		L		T	W		L		T
No. 7 East Texas State $^	7	–	0	–	0	10	–	3	–	0
Angelo State	5	–	2	–	0	7	–	3	–	0
Eastern New Mexico	5	–	2	–	0	6	–	4	–	0
Texas A&I	5	–	2	–	0	6	–	4	–	0
Central State (OK)	3	–	4	–	0	4	–	6	–	0
Cameron	1	–	6	–	0	2	–	8	–	0
Abilene Christian	1	–	6	–	0	1	–	9	–	0
West Texas State	1	–	6	–	0	1	–	10	–	0
$ – Conference champion; ^ – NCAA Division II playoff participant; Rankings from NCAA Division II Football Committee poll

1990 Midwest Intercollegiate Football Conference standings
	Conf.					Overall
Team	W		L		T	W		L		T
No. 6 Grand Valley State $^	9	–	1	–	0	10	–	2	–	0
No. T–20 Ashland	7	–	3	–	0	7	–	3	–	1
Hillsdale	7	–	3	–	0	7	–	4	–	0
Ferris State	5	–	4	–	1	6	–	4	–	1
Butler	5	–	4	–	1	5	–	5	–	1
Northern Michigan	5	–	4	–	1	5	–	5	–	1
Saginaw Valley State	5	–	5	–	0	6	–	5	–	0
Indianapolis	3	–	6	–	1	3	–	6	–	1
Wayne State (MI)	3	–	7	–	0	3	–	7	–	0
Saint Joseph's (IN)	3	–	7	–	0	3	–	7	–	0
Valparaiso	1	–	9	–	0	1	–	9	–	0
$ – Conference champion; ^ – NCAA Division II playoff participant; Rankings from NCAA Division II Football Committee poll

1990 Missouri Intercollegiate Athletic Association football standings
	Conf.					Overall
Team	W		L		T	W		L		T
No. 3 Pittsburg State $^	9	–	0	–	0	12	–	1	–	0
No. 9 NE Missouri State ^	8	–	1	–	0	9	–	2	–	0
SE Missouri State	7	–	2	–	0	7	–	3	–	0
Central Missouri State	5	–	4	–	0	5	–	5	–	0
Missouri Southern State	4	–	5	–	0	4	–	5	–	0
Washburn	4	–	5	–	0	4	–	6	–	0
Southwest Baptist	4	–	5	–	0	4	–	6	–	0
NW Missouri State	2	–	7	–	0	2	–	8	–	1
Missouri Western State	2	–	7	–	0	2	–	8	–	0
Missouri–Rolla	1	–	8	–	0	1	–	10	–	0
$ – Conference champion; ^ – NCAA Division II playoff participant; Rankings from NCAA Division II Football Committee poll

1990 North Central Conference football standings
	Conf.					Overall
Team	W		L		T	W		L		T
No. 1 North Dakota State $^	9	–	0	–	0	14	–	0	–	0
No. 12 North Dakota	7	–	2	–	0	7	–	3	–	0
No. T–20 Northern Colorado ^	6	–	3	–	0	7	–	4	–	0
Augustana (SD)	5	–	4	–	0	5	–	5	–	0
Morningside	5	–	4	–	0	7	–	4	–	0
Mankato State	4	–	5	–	0	5	–	6	–	0
South Dakota	3	–	6	–	0	4	–	7	–	0
St. Cloud State	3	–	6	–	0	4	–	7	–	0
South Dakota State	2	–	7	–	0	3	–	8	–	0
Nebraska–Omaha	1	–	8	–	0	2	–	9	–	0
$ – Conference champion; ^ – NCAA Division II playoff participant; Rankings from NCAA Division II Football Committee poll

1990 Northern California Athletic Conference football standings
	Conf.					Overall
Team	W		L		T	W		L		T
UC Davis $	5	–	0	–	0	7	–	3	–	0
Sonoma State	4	–	1	–	0	7	–	3	–	0
Chico State	3	–	2	–	0	4	–	6	–	0
San Francisco State	1	–	4	–	0	4	–	7	–	0
Humboldt State	1	–	4	–	0	2	–	8	–	1
Cal State Hayward	1	–	4	–	0	2	–	9	–	0
$ – Conference champion; The first Humboldt State vs. Cal State Hayward game did not count as a conference game.

1990 Northern Intercollegiate Conference football standings
	Conf.					Overall
Team	W		L		T	W		L		T
Minnesota Duluth +	5	–	1	–	0	9	–	1	–	1
No. 5 Southwest State (MN) +^	5	–	1	–	0	8	–	3	–	0
No. 9 Northern State +	5	–	1	–	0	7	–	4	–	0
No. 19 Moorhead State	3	–	3	–	0	5	–	5	–	0
Minnesota Morris	2	–	4	–	0	4	–	7	–	0
Winona State	1	–	5	–	0	2	–	9	–	0
Bemidji State	0	–	6	–	0	1	–	10	–	0
+ – Conference co-champions; ^ – NAIA Division I playoff participant; Rankings from NAIA Division I poll

1990 Pennsylvania State Athletic Conference football standings
	Conf.					Overall
Team	W		L		T	W		L		T
East Division
Millersville x	5	–	0	–	0	7	–	3	–	0
East Stroudsburg	3	–	2	–	0	6	–	4	–	0
Bloomsburg	3	–	2	–	0	4	–	7	–	0
Kutztown	2	–	3	–	0	5	–	6	–	0
Mansfield	2	–	3	–	0	4	–	5	–	1
Cheyney	0	–	5	–	0	0	–	11	–	0
West Chester *	0	–	0	–	0	6	–	4	–	0
West Division
No. 4 IUP x^	6	–	0	–	0	12	–	2	–	0
No. 11 Edinboro ^	5	–	1	–	0	9	–	3	–	0
Slippery Rock	4	–	2	–	0	4	–	6	–	1
California (PA)	3	–	3	–	0	4	–	5	–	1
Shippensburg	2	–	4	–	0	5	–	6	–	0
Clarion	1	–	5	–	0	2	–	8	–	0
Lock Haven	0	–	6	–	0	1	–	10	–	0
x – Division champion/co-champions; ^ – NCAA Division II playoff participant; * – West Chester was suspended from conference play because the team scheduled a game against Delaware instead of Mansfield on the date mandated by the PSAC.; Rankings from NCAA Division II Football Committee poll

1990 Southern Intercollegiate Athletic Conference football standings
	Conf.					Overall
Team	W		L		T	W		L		T
Alabama A&M $	6	–	1	–	0	6	–	5	–	0
No. 14 Tuskegee	6	–	1	–	0	8	–	3	–	0
Savannah State	5	–	2	–	0	7	–	4	–	0
Albany State	4	–	3	–	0	6	–	4	–	0
Morris Brown	4	–	3	–	0	4	–	6	–	0
Clark Atlanta	2	–	5	–	0	4	–	6	–	0
Fort Valley State	2	–	5	–	0	4	–	7	–	0
Morehouse	1	–	6	–	0	1	–	7	–	1
Miles	0	–	6	–	0	1	–	9	–	0
$ – Conference champion; Rankings from NCAA Division II Football Committee poll

1990 Western Football Conference standings
	Conf.					Overall
Team	W		L		T	W		L		T
No. 8 Cal Poly +^	4	–	1	–	0	10	–	2	–	0
No. 13 Cal State Northridge +^	4	–	1	–	0	7	–	4	–	0
Portland State	2	–	3	–	0	6	–	5	–	0
Santa Clara	2	–	3	–	0	6	–	5	–	0
Southern Utah State	2	–	3	–	0	6	–	5	–	0
Sacramento State	1	–	4	–	0	4	–	6	–	0
+ – Conference co-champions; ^ – NCAA Division II playoff participant; Rankings from NCAA Division II Football Committee poll

1990 NCAA Division II independents football records
	Conf.			Overall
Team	W	L	T	W		L		T
No. 18 Wofford ^		–		9	–	3	–	0
No. 17 American International		–		7	–	3	–	0
No. 19 New Haven		–		7	–	3	–	0
Saint Mary's		–		7	–	3	–	0
Wayne State (NE)		–		7	–	4	–	0
Michigan Tech		–		6	–	4	–	0
Springfield		–		6	–	4	–	0
Kearney State		–		6	–	5	–	0
Southern Connecticut State		–		5	–	5	–	0
Central Connecticut		–		2	–	7	–	0
Cal Lutheran		–		2	–	8	–	0
Kentucky State		–		2	–	9	–	0
^ – NCAA Division II playoff participant; Rankings from NCAA Division II Football Committee poll

== Conference summaries ==
Conference Champions

Central Intercollegiate Athletic Association – Winston-Salem State
Gulf South Conference – Mississippi College
Lone Star Conference – East Texas State
Midwest Intercollegiate Football Conference – Grand Valley State
Missouri Intercollegiate Athletic Association – Pittsburg State
North Central Conference – North Dakota State
Northern California Athletic Conference – UC Davis
Northern Intercollegiate Conference – Minnesota–Duluth, Northern State, and Southwest Minnesota State
Pennsylvania State Athletic Conference – Millersville (East), Indiana (PA) (West)
Rocky Mountain Athletic Conference – Colorado Mesa
South Atlantic Conference – Carson-Newman
Southern Intercollegiate Athletic Conference – Alabama A&M
Western Football League – Cal Poly–SLO and Cal State Northridge

== Postseason ==
1990 NCAA Division II Football Championship
- Teams: 16
- Finals Site: Braly Municipal Stadium; Florence, AL
- Champion: North Dakota State; (5th title, title game)
- Runner-up: IUP; (1st title game)
- Semifinalists: Mississippi College; Pittsburg State
- Winning coach: championship

The 1990 NCAA Division II Football Championship playoffs were the 18th single-elimination tournament to determine the national champion of men's NCAA Division II college football. The championship game was held at Braly Municipal Stadium in Florence, Alabama, for the fifth time.

=== Playoff bracket ===
First round Campus sites
Mississippi College	70
Wofford	19
Jacksonville State	38
North Alabama	14
IUP	48
Winston-Salem State	0
Edinboro	38
Virginia Union	14
North Dakota State	17
Northern Colorado	7
Cal Poly	14
Cal State Northridge	7
Pittsburg State	59
Northeast Missouri State	3
East Texas State	20
Grand Valley State	14

Quarterfinals; Campus sites
Mississippi College	14
Jacksonville State	7
IUP	14
Edinboro	7
North Dakota State	47
Cal Poly	0
Pittsburg State	60
East Texas State	28

Semifinals; Campus sites
Mississippi College	8
IUP	27
North Dakota State	39
Pittsburg State	29

Championship; Braly Municipal Stadium; Florence, AL
IUP	11
North Dakota State	51

== See also ==
- 1990 NCAA Division I-A football season
- 1990 NCAA Division I-AA football season
- 1990 NCAA Division III football season
- 1990 NAIA Division I football season
- 1990 NAIA Division II football season
