= 1988 NCAA Division II football season =

American college football season

- Regular season: August – November 1988
- Playoffs: November 19 – December 10, 1988
- National Championship: Braly Municipal Stadium; Florence, AL
- Champion: North Dakota State (4)
- Harlon Hill Trophy: Johnny Bailey, Texas A&I

The 1988 NCAA Division II football season, part of college football in the United States organized by the National Collegiate Athletic Association at the Division II level, began in August 1988, and concluded with the NCAA Division II Football Championship on December 10, 1988, at Braly Municipal Stadium in Florence, Alabama, hosted by the University of North Alabama. The North Dakota State Bison defeated the Portland State Vikings, 35–21, to win their fourth Division II national title. The tournament bracket also expanded for the first time, from 8 teams to 16 teams.

The Harlon Hill Trophy was awarded to Johnny Bailey, running back from Texas A&I, for the second consecutive year.

== Conference changes and new programs ==
- St. Paul's (VA) dropped their football program in July of 1988 and would not return to the gridiron until 2002.

| School | 1987 Conference | 1988 Conference |
|---|---|---|
| Cameron | NAIA Independent | Lone Star |
| Central State (OK) | NAIA Independent | Lone Star |
| Evansville | Heartland | Mid-South (NAIA) |
| Liberty | D-II Independent | I-AA Independent |
| St. Paul's (VA) | CIAA | Dropped Program |
| Southwest Baptist | NAIA Independent | MIAA |
| Wofford | NAIA Independent | Independent |

== Conference standings ==
1988 Central Intercollegiate Athletic Association football standings
| | Conf. | | | | | Overall |
| Team | W | | L | | T | W | | L | | T |
|---|---|---|---|---|---|---|---|---|---|---|
Northern Division
| Virginia State xy | 5 | – | 1 | – | 0 | 7 | – | 4 | – | 0 |
| Virginia Union | 4 | – | 2 | – | 0 | 7 | – | 2 | – | 0 |
| Hampton | 3 | – | 3 | – | 0 | 7 | – | 3 | – | 0 |
| Norfolk State | 2 | – | 4 | – | 0 | 5 | – | 5 | – | 0 |
| Elizabeth City State | 1 | – | 4 | – | 1 | 2 | – | 7 | – | 1 |
Southern Division
| No. 5 Winston-Salem State xy$^ | 5 | – | 1 | – | 0 | 10 | – | 2 | – | 0 |
| No. 20 Bowie State ^ | 4 | – | 1 | – | 1 | 9 | – | 2 | – | 1 |
| No. 17 North Carolina Central ^ | 4 | – | 1 | – | 1 | 9 | – | 2 | – | 1 |
| Johnson C. Smith | 1 | – | 4 | – | 1 | 2 | – | 7 | – | 1 |
| Livingstone | 1 | – | 5 | – | 0 | 3 | – | 6 | – | 0 |
| Fayetteville State | 0 | – | 4 | – | 2 | 0 | – | 7 | – | 2 |
Championship: Winston-Salem State 13, Virginia State 9
$ – Conference champion; x – Division champion/co-champions; y – Championship game participant; ^ – NCAA Division II playoff participant; Rankings from NCAA Division II Football Committee poll

1988 Great Lakes Intercollegiate Athletic Conference football standings
| | Conf. | | | | | Overall |
| Team | W | | L | | T | W | | L | | T |
|---|---|---|---|---|---|---|---|---|---|---|
| No. 5 Hillsdale $^ | 5 | – | 0 | – | 0 | 10 | – | 2 | – | 0 |
| No. 19 Northern Michigan | 4 | – | 1 | – | 0 | 8 | – | 3 | – | 0 |
| Grand Valley State | 3 | – | 2 | – | 0 | 7 | – | 4 | – | 0 |
| No. 25 Saginaw Valley State | 2 | – | 3 | – | 0 | 4 | – | 5 | – | 0 |
| Ferris State | 1 | – | 4 | – | 0 | 4 | – | 7 | – | 0 |
| Wayne State (MI) | 0 | – | 5 | – | 0 | 2 | – | 8 | – | 0 |
$ – Conference champion; ^ – NAIA Division I playoff participant; Rankings from NCAA Division II Football Committee poll for Northern Michigan and NAIA Division I poll for Hillsdale and Saginaw Valley State

1988 Gulf South Conference football standings
| | Conf. | | | | | Overall |
| Team | W | | L | | T | W | | L | | T |
|---|---|---|---|---|---|---|---|---|---|---|
| No. 9 Tennessee–Martin +^ | 7 | – | 1 | – | 0 | 11 | – | 2 | – | 0 |
| No. 7 Jacksonville State +^ | 7 | – | 1 | – | 0 | 10 | – | 2 | – | 0 |
| No. 6 Mississippi College +^ | 7 | – | 1 | – | 0 | 9 | – | 3 | – | 0 |
| Valdosta State | 4 | – | 3 | – | 1 | 6 | – | 3 | – | 1 |
| Troy State | 3 | – | 5 | – | 0 | 4 | – | 6 | – | 0 |
| West Georgia | 3 | – | 5 | – | 0 | 4 | – | 6 | – | 0 |
| Delta State | 2 | – | 5 | – | 1 | 4 | – | 6 | – | 1 |
| North Alabama | 2 | – | 6 | – | 0 | 2 | – | 8 | – | 0 |
| Livingston | 0 | – | 8 | – | 0 | 0 | – | 11 | – | 0 |
+ – Conference co-champions; ^ – NCAA Division II playoff participant; Rankings from NCAA Division II Football Committee poll

1988 Heartland Collegiate Conference standings
| | Conf. | | | | | Overall |
| Team | W | | L | | T | W | | L | | T |
|---|---|---|---|---|---|---|---|---|---|---|
| Butler $^ | 3 | – | 0 | – | 1 | 8 | – | 2 | – | 1 |
| Saint Joseph's (IN) | 3 | – | 1 | – | 0 | 4 | – | 6 | – | 0 |
| Ashland | 2 | – | 2 | – | 0 | 6 | – | 4 | – | 0 |
| Indianapolis | 1 | – | 2 | – | 1 | 5 | – | 4 | – | 1 |
| Valparaiso | 0 | – | 4 | – | 0 | 0 | – | 9 | – | 1 |
$ – Conference champion; ^ – NCAA Division II playoff participant

1988 Lone Star Conference football standings
| | Conf. | | | | | Overall |
| Team | W | | L | | T | W | | L | | T |
|---|---|---|---|---|---|---|---|---|---|---|
| No. 3 Texas A&I $^ | 6 | – | 1 | – | 0 | 10 | – | 3 | – | 0 |
| No. 15 East Texas State | 5 | – | 2 | – | 0 | 8 | – | 3 | – | 0 |
| Angelo State | 5 | – | 2 | – | 0 | 6 | – | 4 | – | 0 |
| No. 18 Cameron | 4 | – | 3 | – | 0 | 5 | – | 3 | – | 1 |
| Central State (OK) | 4 | – | 3 | – | 0 | 4 | – | 5 | – | 0 |
| Abilene Christian | 3 | – | 4 | – | 0 | 3 | – | 7 | – | 0 |
| West Texas State | 1 | – | 6 | – | 0 | 2 | – | 8 | – | 0 |
| Eastern New Mexico | 0 | – | 6 | – | 0 | 2 | – | 8 | – | 0 |
$ – Conference champion; ^ – NCAA Division II playoff participant; Rankings from NCAA Division II Football Committee poll for Texas A&I and East Texas State and NAIA Division I poll for Cameron

1988 Missouri Intercollegiate Athletic Association football standings
| | Conf. | | | | | Overall |
| Team | W | | L | | T | W | | L | | T |
|---|---|---|---|---|---|---|---|---|---|---|
| NE Missouri State + | 5 | – | 1 | – | 0 | 7 | – | 3 | – | 0 |
| SE Missouri State + | 5 | – | 1 | – | 0 | 6 | – | 4 | – | 0 |
| Central Missouri State + | 5 | – | 1 | – | 0 | 6 | – | 5 | – | 0 |
| Missouri–Rolla | 2 | – | 4 | – | 0 | 2 | – | 8 | – | 0 |
| NW Missouri State | 2 | – | 4 | – | 0 | 2 | – | 9 | – | 0 |
| Southwest Baptist | 1 | – | 5 | – | 0 | 2 | – | 8 | – | 0 |
| Lincoln (MO) | 1 | – | 5 | – | 0 | 1 | – | 10 | – | 0 |
+ – Conference co-champions

1988 North Central Conference football standings
| | Conf. | | | | | Overall |
| Team | W | | L | | T | W | | L | | T |
|---|---|---|---|---|---|---|---|---|---|---|
| No. 1 North Dakota State $^ | 9 | – | 0 | – | 0 | 14 | – | 0 | – | 0 |
| No. 18 Augustana (SD) ^ | 6 | – | 3 | – | 0 | 8 | – | 4 | – | 0 |
| South Dakota State | 6 | – | 3 | – | 0 | 7 | – | 4 | – | 0 |
| North Dakota | 5 | – | 4 | – | 0 | 7 | – | 4 | – | 0 |
| No. 17 St. Cloud State | 5 | – | 4 | – | 0 | 7 | – | 4 | – | 0 |
| South Dakota | 4 | – | 5 | – | 0 | 6 | – | 5 | – | 0 |
| Northern Colorado | 4 | – | 5 | – | 0 | 5 | – | 5 | – | 0 |
| Nebraska–Omaha | 4 | – | 5 | – | 0 | 6 | – | 5 | – | 0 |
| Mankato State | 2 | – | 7 | – | 0 | 3 | – | 8 | – | 0 |
| Morningside | 0 | – | 9 | – | 0 | 0 | – | 11 | – | 0 |
$ – Conference champion; ^ – NCAA Division II playoff participant; Rankings from NCAA Division II Football Committee poll

1988 Northern California Athletic Conference football standings
| | Conf. | | | | | Overall |
| Team | W | | L | | T | W | | L | | T |
|---|---|---|---|---|---|---|---|---|---|---|
| No. 13 UC Davis $^ | 5 | – | 0 | – | 0 | 7 | – | 3 | – | 1 |
| Sonoma State | 3 | – | 2 | – | 0 | 5 | – | 5 | – | 0 |
| Chico State | 3 | – | 2 | – | 0 | 3 | – | 7 | – | 0 |
| Humboldt State | 2 | – | 3 | – | 0 | 4 | – | 6 | – | 0 |
| Cal State Hayward | 1 | – | 4 | – | 0 | 2 | – | 9 | – | 0 |
| San Francisco State | 1 | – | 4 | – | 0 | 1 | – | 9 | – | 0 |
$ – Conference champion; ^ – NCAA Division II playoff participant; Rankings from NCAA Division II Football Committee poll

1988 Northern Intercollegiate Conference football standings
| | Conf. | | | | | Overall |
| Team | W | | L | | T | W | | L | | T |
|---|---|---|---|---|---|---|---|---|---|---|
| No. 12 Moorhead State $^ | 6 | – | 0 | – | 0 | 9 | – | 3 | – | 0 |
| No. 15 Northern State ^ | 5 | – | 1 | – | 0 | 8 | – | 4 | – | 0 |
| Minnesota Duluth | 4 | – | 2 | – | 0 | 7 | – | 4 | – | 0 |
| Minnesota Morris | 3 | – | 3 | – | 0 | 4 | – | 6 | – | 0 |
| Southwest State (MN) | 2 | – | 4 | – | 0 | 4 | – | 6 | – | 0 |
| Winona State | 1 | – | 5 | – | 0 | 3 | – | 8 | – | 0 |
| Bemidji State | 0 | – | 6 | – | 0 | 1 | – | 9 | – | 0 |
$ – Conference champion; ^ – NAIA Division I playoff participant; Rankings from NAIA Division I poll

1988 Pennsylvania State Athletic Conference football standings
| | Conf. | | | | | Overall |
| Team | W | | L | | T | W | | L | | T |
|---|---|---|---|---|---|---|---|---|---|---|
East Division
| No. 11 Millersville x^ | 6 | – | 0 | – | 0 | 10 | – | 2 | – | 0 |
| No. 2 West Chester | 5 | – | 1 | – | 0 | 9 | – | 2 | – | 0 |
| Bloomsburg | 4 | – | 2 | – | 0 | 7 | – | 4 | – | 0 |
| East Stroudsburg | 3 | – | 3 | – | 0 | 4 | – | 6 | – | 0 |
| Mansfield | 2 | – | 4 | – | 0 | 4 | – | 5 | – | 2 |
| Cheyney | 1 | – | 5 | – | 0 | 2 | – | 8 | – | 0 |
| Kutztown | 1 | – | 5 | – | 0 | 2 | – | 8 | – | 0 |
West Division
| No. 14 IUP ^ | 5 | – | 1 | – | 0 | 8 | – | 3 | – | 0 |
| Shippensburg x | 5 | – | 1 | – | 0 | 6 | – | 4 | – | 0 |
| Edinboro | 4 | – | 1 | – | 1 | 5 | – | 4 | – | 1 |
| Slippery Rock | 2 | – | 2 | – | 2 | 5 | – | 3 | – | 2 |
| Clarion | 2 | – | 4 | – | 0 | 3 | – | 7 | – | 0 |
| California (PA) | 1 | – | 5 | – | 0 | 2 | – | 8 | – | 0 |
| Lock Haven | 0 | – | 5 | – | 1 | 2 | – | 7 | – | 2 |
x – Division champion/co-champions; ^ – NCAA Division II playoff participant; Shippensburg won the West Division on the bases of a head-to-head win over IUP.; Rankings from NCAA Division II Football Committee poll

1988 Southern Intercollegiate Athletic Conference football standings
| | Conf. | | | | | Overall |
| Team | W | | L | | T | W | | L | | T |
|---|---|---|---|---|---|---|---|---|---|---|
| No. 12 Albany State $ | 6 | – | 1 | – | 0 | 8 | – | 2 | – | 0 |
| Savannah State | 6 | – | 1 | – | 0 | 8 | – | 2 | – | 0 |
| Alabama A&M | 6 | – | 1 | – | 0 | 7 | – | 3 | – | 0 |
| Fort Valley State | 4 | – | 3 | – | 0 | 5 | – | 5 | – | 0 |
| Tuskegee | 3 | – | 4 | – | 0 | 3 | – | 6 | – | 0 |
| Morehouse | 2 | – | 5 | – | 0 | 4 | – | 7 | – | 0 |
| Clark (GA) | 1 | – | 6 | – | 0 | 1 | – | 8 | – | 0 |
| Morris Brown | 0 | – | 7 | – | 0 | 0 | – | 10 | – | 0 |
| Knoxville | 0 | – | 0 | – | 0 | 4 | – | 4 | – | 1 |
| Lane | 0 | – | 0 | – | 0 | 4 | – | 5 | – | 0 |
| Miles | 0 | – | 0 | – | 0 | 2 | – | 5 | – | 1 |
$ – Conference champion; Rankings from NCAA Division II Football Committee poll

1988 Western Football Conference standings
| | Conf. | | | | | Overall |
| Team | W | | L | | T | W | | L | | T |
|---|---|---|---|---|---|---|---|---|---|---|
| No. 4 Portland State $^ | 6 | – | 0 | – | 0 | 11 | – | 3 | – | 1 |
| No. 10 Sacramento State ^ | 4 | – | 2 | – | 0 | 10 | – | 3 | – | 0 |
| Santa Clara | 4 | – | 2 | – | 0 | 7 | – | 4 | – | 0 |
| Cal Poly | 3 | – | 3 | – | 0 | 5 | – | 4 | – | 1 |
| Cal State Northridge | 2 | – | 4 | – | 0 | 6 | – | 5 | – | 0 |
| Southern Utah State | 2 | – | 4 | – | 0 | 4 | – | 7 | – | 0 |
| Cal Lutheran | 0 | – | 6 | – | 0 | 2 | – | 8 | – | 0 |
$ – Conference champion; ^ – NCAA Division II playoff participant; Rankings from NCAA Division II Football Committee poll

1988 NCAA Division II independents football records
| | Conf. | | | Overall |
| Team | W | L | T | W | | L | | T |
|---|---|---|---|---|---|---|---|---|
| Saint Mary's | | – | | 10 | – | 0 | – | 0 |
| New Haven | | – | | 7 | – | 3 | – | 0 |
| Springfield | | – | | 6 | – | 3 | – | 1 |
| Central Connecticut | | – | | 5 | – | 3 | – | 1 |
| Michigan Tech | | – | | 6 | – | 4 | – | 0 |
| UCF | | – | | 6 | – | 5 | – | 0 |
| American International | | – | | 5 | – | 5 | – | 0 |
| Wofford | | – | | 5 | – | 5 | – | 0 |
| Kentucky State | | – | | 4 | – | 7 | – | 0 |
| Southern Connecticut State | | – | | 0 | – | 10 | – | 0 |

== Conference summaries ==
Conference Champions

Central Intercollegiate Athletic Association – Winston-Salem State
Great Lakes Intercollegiate Athletic Conference – Hillsdale
Gulf South Conference – Jacksonville State, Mississippi College, and Tennessee–Martin
Heartland Collegiate Conference – Butler
Lone Star Conference – Texas A&I
Missouri Intercollegiate Athletic Association – Central Missouri State, Southeast Missouri State, and Northeast Missouri State
North Central Conference – North Dakota State
Northern California Athletic Conference – UC Davis
Northern Intercollegiate Conference – Minnesota State–Moorhead
Pennsylvania State Athletic Conference – Millersville (East), Shippensburg (West)
Rocky Mountain Athletic Conference – Colorado Mesa
South Atlantic Conference – Carson-Newman, Catawba, and Lenoir-Rhyne
Southern Intercollegiate Athletic Conference – Albany State
Western Football League – Portland State

== Postseason ==
1988 NCAA Division II Football Championship
- Teams: 16
- Finals Site: Braly Municipal Stadium; Florence, AL
- Champion: North Dakota State; (4th title, title game)
- Runner-up: Portland State; (2nd title game)
- Semifinalists: Sacramento State; Texas A&I
- Winning coach: championship

The 1988 NCAA Division II Football Championship playoffs were the 16th single-elimination tournament to determine the national champion of men's NCAA Division II college football. The championship game was held at Braly Municipal Stadium in Florence, Alabama, for the third time.

=== Playoff bracket ===
First round Campus sites
North Dakota State | 49
Augustana (SD) | 7
Millersville | 27
IUP | 24
Sacramento State | 35
UC Davis | 14
North Carolina Central | 31
Winston-Salem State | 16
Texas A&I | 39
Mississippi College | 15
Tennessee–Martin | 23
Butler | 6
Portland State | 34
Bowie State | 17
Jacksonville State | 63
West Chester | 24

Quarterfinals; Campus sites
North Dakota State | 36
Millersville | 26
Sacramento State | 56
North Carolina Central | 7
Texas A&I | 34
Tennessee–Martin | 0
Portland State | 20
Jacksonville State | 13

Semifinals; Campus sites
North Dakota State | 42
Sacramento State | 20
Texas A&I | 27
Portland State | 35

Championship; Braly Municipal Stadium; Florence, AL
North Dakota State | 35
Portland State | 21

== See also ==
- 1988 NCAA Division I-A football season
- 1988 NCAA Division I-AA football season
- 1988 NCAA Division III football season
- 1988 NAIA Division I football season
- 1988 NAIA Division II football season
