= 1988 NCAA Division II football rankings =

The 1988 NCAA Division II football rankings are from the Associated Press. This is for the 1988 season. The preseason poll and the first two weeks had 10 entries. From the third week onward, the poll was switched to a "Top 20".

== Legend ==
	Increase in ranking
	Decrease in ranking
	Not ranked previous week
(#–#)	Win–loss record
(Italics)	Number of first place votes
т	Tied with team above or below also with this symbol

== NCAA Division II Football Committee poll ==
	Preseason	Week 1 Sept 13	Week 2 Sept 20	Week 3 Sept 27	Week 4 Oct 3	Week 5 Oct 10	Week 6 Oct 17	Week 7 Oct 24	Week 8 Oct 31	Week 9 Nov 7	
1.	Troy State	Troy State (2–0)	North Dakota State (2–0)	North Dakota State (3–0)	North Dakota State (4–0)	North Dakota State (5–0)	North Dakota State (6–0)	North Dakota State (7–0)	North Dakota State (8–0)	North Dakota State (9–0)	1.
2.	Portland State	North Dakota State (1–0)	UCF (3–0)	UCF (4–0)	UCF (5–0)	Winston–Salem State (6–0)	Winston–Salem State (7–0)	East Texas State (7–1)	East Texas State (8–1)	West Chester (8–1)	2.
3.	Northern Michigan	UCF (2–0)	IUP (2–0)	IUP (3–0)	IUP (4–0)	Jacksonville State (6–0)	Jacksonville State (7–0)	West Chester (6–1)	West Chester (7–1)	Texas A&I (7–2)	3.
4.	Texas A&I	IUP (1–0)	St. Cloud State (3–0)	St. Cloud State (4–0)	Winston–Salem State (5–0)	Millersville (5–0)	Millersville (6–0)	Texas A&I (5–2)	Texas A&I (6–2)	Portland State (7–2–1)	4.
5.	UCF	Northeast Missouri State (2–0)	West Chester (2–0)	Cal State Northridge (4–0)	Texas A&I (3–1)	East Texas State (5–1)	East Texas State (6–1)	Portland State (5–2–1)	Portland State (6–2–1)	Winston–Salem State (8–1)	5.
6.	North Dakota State	St. Cloud State (2–0)	Cal State Northridge (3–0)	Winston–Salem State (4–0)	Jacksonville State (5–0)	Cal State Northridge (5–1)	Butler (6–1)	Sacramento State (6–1)	Winston–Salem State (8–1)	Mississippi College (8–2)	6.
7.	West Chester	West Chester (1–0)	Winston–Salem State (3–0)	Texas A&I (2–1)	Millersville (4–0)	Butler (4–1)	West Chester (5–1)	Winston–Salem State (7–1)	Mississippi College (7–2)	Jacksonville State (8–1)	7.
8.	Mankato State	Texas A&I (1–1)	Troy State (2–1) т	Troy State (3–1)	Butler (4–1)	West Chester (4–1)	Texas A&I (4–2)	Jacksonville State (7–1)	Jacksonville State (7–1)	Butler (8–1–1)	8.
9.	IUP	Cal State Northridge (2–0)	Texas A&I (1–1) т	Jacksonville State (4–0)	Augustana (SD) (4–1)	Albany State (5–0)	Portland State (4–2–1)	Bowie State (8–0)	Butler (7–1–1)	Tennessee–Martin (9–1)	9.
10.	Angelo State	Butler (1–1) т	East Texas State (2–0)	Sacramento State (3–0)	East Texas State (4–1)	Texas A&I (3–2)	UCF (6–1)	Mississippi College (6–2)	Bowie State (8–0–1)	Sacramento State (7–2)	10.
11.		Winston–Salem State (2–0) т		Millersville (4–0)	West Chester (3–1)	Portland State (3–2–1)	Sacramento State (5–1)	Butler (6–1–1)	Tennessee–Martin (8–1)	Millersville (8–1)	11.
12.				Nebraska–Omaha (3–0)	Cal State Northridge (4–1)	IUP (4–1)	Mississippi College (5–2)	Tennessee–Martin (7–1)	Sacramento State (6–2)	Albany State (8–1)	12.
13.				Butler (3–1)	Albany State (5–0)	New Haven (4–1)	Bowie State (7–0)	Bloomsburg (7–1)	Millersville (7–1)	UC Davis (6–2–1)	13.
14.				North Carolina Central (4–0)	Manual (3–1)	UCF (5–1)	Tennessee–Martin (6–1)	Northern Michigan (6–2)	Albany State (7–1)	IUP (7–2)	14.
15.				New Haven (4–0)	Bowie State (5–0)	Sacramento State (4–1)	North Dakota (5–2)	Millersville (6–1)	UC Davis (5–2–1)	East Texas State (8–2)	15.
16.				East Texas State (3–1)	Tennessee–Martin (4–0)	Mississippi College (4–2)	Bloomsburg (6–1)	Albany State (6–1)	IUP (6–2)	St. Cloud State (7–3)	16.
17.				Bloomsburg (3–1)	St. Cloud State (4–1)	Bowie State (6–0)	St. Cloud State (5–2)	UC Davis (7–1)	North Carolina Central (7–1–1)	North Carolina Central (8–1–1)	17.
18.				West Chester (2–1)	Bloomsburg (4–1)	Tennessee–Martin (5–1)	Northern Michigan (5–2)	North Carolina Central (7–1)	St. Cloud State (6–3)	Augustana (SD) (7–3)	18.
19.				Mississippi College (3–1)	Nebraska–Omaha (4–1)	Bloomsburg (5–1)	Albany State (5–1)	Ashland (6–1)	Northern Michigan (6–3)	Northern Michigan (7–3)	19.
20.				Augustana (SD) (3–1)	Northern Michigan (3–2)	Northern Colorado (3–2–1)	Ashland (5–1)	Augustana (SD) (6–2)	Augustana (SD) (6–3)	Bowie State (8–1–1)	20.
	Preseason	Week 1 Sept 13	Week 2 Sept 20	Week 3 Sept 27	Week 4 Oct 3	Week 5 Oct 10	Week 6 Oct 17	Week 7 Oct 24	Week 8 Oct 31	Week 9 Nov 7	
		Dropped: 2 Portland State; 3 Northern Michigan; 8 Mankato State; 10 Angelo State	Dropped: 5 Northeast Missouri State; 10 Butler	None	Dropped: 8 Troy State; 10 Sacramento State; 14 North Carolina Central; 15 New Haven; 19 Mississippi College	Dropped: 9 Augustana (SD); 14 North Dakota; 17 St. Cloud State; 19 Nebraska–Omaha; 20 Northern Michigan	Dropped: 6 Cal State Northridge; 12 IUP; 13 New Haven; 20 Northern Colorado	Dropped: 10 UCF; 15 North Dakota; 17 St. Cloud State	Dropped: 13 Bloomsburg; 19 Ashland	None	
