= 1986 Cal Poly Mustangs football team =

American college football season

1986 Cal Poly Mustangs football
- Conference: Western Football Conference
- Record: 5–5 (3–3 WFC)
- Head coach: Jim Sanderson (5th season)
- Home stadium: Mustang Stadium

1986 Western Football Conference standings
	Conf.					Overall
Team	W		L		T	W		L		T
Sacramento State $	5	–	1	–	0	6	–	4	–	1
No. 9 Cal State Northridge	4	–	2	–	0	8	–	3	–	0
Portland State	4	–	2	–	0	6	–	5	–	0
Southern Utah State	3	–	3	–	0	8	–	3	–	0
Cal Poly	3	–	3	–	0	5	–	5	–	0
Santa Clara	2	–	4	–	0	4	–	7	–	0
Cal Lutheran	0	–	6	–	0	3	–	8	–	0
$ – Conference champion; Rankings from NCAA Division II Football Committee poll

The 1986 Cal Poly Mustangs football team represented California Polytechnic State University, San Luis Obispo as a member of the Western Football Conference (WFC) during the 1986 NCAA Division II football season. Led by Jim Sanderson in his fifth and final season as head coach, Cal Poly compiled an overall record of 5–5 with a mark of 3–3 in conference play, tying for fourth place in the WFC. The team was outscored by its opponents 246 to 233 for the season. The Mustangs played home games at Mustang Stadium in San Luis Obispo, California.

== Schedule ==
Date	Opponent	Site	Result	Attendance	Source
September 13	Chico State*	Mustang Stadium; San Luis Obispo, CA	W 26–18	4,330	
September 20	at No. 4 UC Davis*	Toomey Field; Davis, CA (rivalry)	L 21–32	8,700–8,770	
October 4	Cal Lutheran	Mustang Stadium; San Luis Obispo, CA	W 33–9	3,290	
October 11	Cal State Hayward*	Mustang Stadium; San Luis Obispo, CA	L 14–17	2,563	
October 18	at No. 16 Cal State Northridge	Devonshire Downs; Northridge, CA	L 20–21	4,206	
October 25	Central Connecticut*	Mustang Stadium; San Luis Obispo, CA	W 17–10	2,064	
November 1	at Portland State	Civic Stadium; Portland, OR	L 7–66	3,489–4,489	
November 8	No. 19 Sacramento State	Mustang Stadium; San Luis Obispo, CA	W 26–6	2,014	
November 15	Southern Utah State	Mustang Stadium; San Luis Obispo, CA	L 33–43	2,877	
November 22	at Santa Clara	Buck Shaw Stadium; Santa Clara, CA	W 36–24	2,834	
*Non-conference game; Rankings from NCAA Division II Football Committee Poll released prior to the game
