= 1986 San Francisco State Gators football team =

American college football season

1986 San Francisco State Gators football
- Conference: Northern California Athletic Conference
- Record: 2–9 (1–4 NCAC)
- Head coach: Vic Rowen (26th season)
- Home stadium: Cox Stadium

1986 Northern California Athletic Conference football standings
	Conf.					Overall
Team	W		L		T	W		L		T
No. 2 UC Davis $^	5	–	0	–	0	10	–	1	–	0
Chico State	4	–	1	–	0	7	–	3	–	0
Cal State Hayward	3	–	2	–	0	7	–	3	–	0
Sonoma State	2	–	3	–	0	4	–	6	–	0
San Francisco State	1	–	4	–	0	2	–	9	–	0
Humboldt State	0	–	5	–	0	2	–	9	–	0
$ – Conference champion; ^ – NCAA Division II playoff participant; Rankings from NCAA Division II Football Committee poll

The 1986 San Francisco State Gators football team represented San Francisco State University as a member of the Northern California Athletic Conference (NCAC) during the 1986 NCAA Division II football season. Led by 26th-year head coach Vic Rowen, San Francisco State finished the season with an overall record of 1–10 and a mark of 1–4 in conference play, placing fifth in the NCAC. For the season the team was outscored by its opponents 390 to 123. The Gators played home games at Cox Stadium in San Francisco.

After the season, Azusa Pacific was forced to forfeit their 1986 victories due to the use of ineligible players. That included their November 1 victory over San Francisco State. The forfeit improved the Gators' overall record to 2–9.

== Schedule ==
Date	Opponent	Site	Result	Attendance	Source
September 6	at Wichita State*	Cessna Stadium; Wichita, KS	L 6–69	18,836	
September 13	at Cal Lutheran*	Mt. Clef Field; Thousand Oaks, CA	L 0–31	2,108	
September 20	at Saint Mary's*	Saint Mary's Stadium; Moraga, CA	L 21–51	2,750	
September 27	Cal State Northridge*	Cox Stadium; San Francisco, CA	L 0–37	800–1,500	
October 11	at Sonoma State	Cossacks Stadium; Rohnert Park, CA	L 10–16	2,014	
October 18	No. 3 UC Davis	Cox Stadium; San Francisco, CA	L 3–51	3,000	
October 25	at Santa Clara*	Buck Shaw Stadium; Santa Clara, CA	L 24–27	6,277	
November 1	Azusa Pacific*	Cox Stadium; San Francisco, CA	W 17–28 (forfeit win)	1,621	
November 8	Chico State	Cox Stadium; San Francisco, CA	L 0–48	300	
November 15	Humboldt State	Cox Stadium; San Francisco, CA	W 28–12	300	
November 22	at Cal State Hayward	Pioneer Stadium; Hayward, CA	L 14–20	300–500	
*Non-conference game; Rankings from NCAA Division II Football Committee Poll released prior to the game

== Team players in the NFL ==
No San Francisco State players were selected in the 1987 NFL draft.

The following finished their college career in 1986, were not drafted, but played in the NFL.

Player	Position	First NFL team
Joe Jackson	Linebacker	1987 Seattle Seahawks
