= 1986 Humboldt State Lumberjacks football team =

American college football season

1986 Humboldt State Lumberjacks football
- Conference: Northern California Athletic Conference
- Record: 2–9 (0–5 NCAC)
- Head coach: Mike Dolby (1st season)
- Offensive coordinator: Bart Andrus (1st season)
- Home stadium: Redwood Bowl

1986 Northern California Athletic Conference football standings
	Conf.					Overall
Team	W		L		T	W		L		T
No. 2 UC Davis $^	5	–	0	–	0	10	–	1	–	0
Chico State	4	–	1	–	0	7	–	3	–	0
Cal State Hayward	3	–	2	–	0	7	–	3	–	0
Sonoma State	2	–	3	–	0	4	–	6	–	0
San Francisco State	1	–	4	–	0	2	–	9	–	0
Humboldt State	0	–	5	–	0	2	–	9	–	0
$ – Conference champion; ^ – NCAA Division II playoff participant; Rankings from NCAA Division II Football Committee poll

The 1986 Humboldt State Lumberjacks football team represented Humboldt State University—now known as California State Polytechnic University, Humboldt—as a member of the Northern California Athletic Conference (NCAC) during the 1986 NCAA Division II football season. Led by first-year head coach Mike Dolby, the Lumberjacks compiled an overall record of 2–9 with a mark of 0–5 in conference play, placing last out of six teams in the NCAC. The team was outscored by its opponents 350 to 175 for the season. Humboldt State played home games at the Redwood Bowl in Arcata, California.

Humboldt State opened the season at Boise State in the first game ever played on a blue field.

== Schedule ==
Date	Opponent	Site	Result	Attendance	Source
September 13	at Boise State*	Bronco Stadium; Boise, ID	L 0–74	17,456–17,465	
September 20	UC Santa Barbara*	Redwood Bowl; Arcata, CA	W 27–7	3,300–5,000	
September 27	Sacramento State*	Redwood Bowl; Arcata, CA	L 17–45	3,700–4,900	
October 4	at Portland State*	Civic Stadium; Portland, OR	L 16–27	4,823	
October 11	at Menlo*	Connor Field; Atherton, CA	L 22–24	300	
October 18	at Saint Mary's*	Saint Mary's Stadium; Moraga, CA	W 14–10	1,985	
October 25	Chico State	Redwood Bowl; Arcata, CA	L 0–42	3,000–3,700	
November 1	Cal State Hayward	Redwood Bowl; Arcata, CA	L 22–24	600–2,600	
November 8	at Sonoma State	Cossacks Stadium (Note: Seawolf Stadium was known as Cossacks Stadium until 2002 when the University changed the mascot from Cossacks to Seawolves.); Rohnert Park, CA	L 17–24	1,491	
November 15	at San Francisco State	Cox Stadium; San Francisco, CA	L 12–28	300	
November 22	No. 2 UC Davis	Redwood Bowl; Arcata, CA	L 28–45	2,700–2,900	
*Non-conference game; Rankings from NCAA Division II Football Committee Poll released prior to the game
