= Michigan Tech Huskies football, 1980–1989 =

American college football seasons

1980–1989 Michigan Tech Huskies football
- Conference: Great Lakes Intercollegiate Athletic Conference (1980–1985); Independent (1986–1989)
- Head coach: Jim Kapp (1973–1980); Ron Marciel (1981–1983); Tom Danna (1985–1986) Bernie Anderson (1987–2005)
- Home stadium: Hubbell Field (1980); Sherman Field (1981–1989)

The Michigan Tech Huskies football program, 1980–1989 represented Michigan Technological University in college football during the 1980s. The Huskies had a losing record for nine of the ten seasons during the decade, the only winning season being 1988 when they compiled a 6–4 record. They went through four coaches during the decade: Jim Kapp (1973–1980); Ron Marciel (1981–1983); Tom Danna (1985–1986); and Bernie Anderson (1987–2005).

== 1980 ==
1980 Michigan Tech Huskies football
- Conference: Great Lakes Intercollegiate Athletic Conference
- Record: 2–6–1 (0–5–1 GLIAC)
- Head coach: Jim Kapp (8th season)
- Home stadium: Hubbell Field

1980 Great Lakes Intercollegiate Athletic Conference football standings
| | Conf. | | | | | Overall |
| Team | W | | L | | T | W | | L | | T |
|---|---|---|---|---|---|---|---|---|---|---|
| No. 20 Hillsdale $ | 5 | – | 1 | – | 0 | 7 | – | 4 | – | 0 |
| Northwood | 4 | – | 2 | – | 0 | 6 | – | 2 | – | 1 |
| No. 18 Grand Valley State | 4 | – | 2 | – | 0 | 7 | – | 3 | – | 0 |
| Wayne State (MI) | 3 | – | 3 | – | 0 | 5 | – | 4 | – | 0 |
| Ferris State | 2 | – | 3 | – | 1 | 4 | – | 4 | – | 2 |
| Saginaw Valley State | 2 | – | 4 | – | 0 | 5 | – | 6 | – | 0 |
| Michigan Tech | 0 | – | 5 | – | 1 | 2 | – | 6 | – | 1 |
$ – Conference champion; Rankings from NAIA Division I poll

The 1980 Michigan Tech Huskies football team represented Michigan Technological University as a member of the Great Lakes Intercollegiate Athletic Conference (GLIAC) during the 1980 NCAA Division II football season. In their eighth year under head coach Jim Kapp, the Huskies compiled a 2–6–1 record (0–5–1 in conference games), finished in last place in the GLIAC, and were outscored by a total of 208 to 117.

The team's individual statistical leaders included:

- Senior running back Clark Cryderman led the team with 374 rushing yards. He also led the team with 30 points scored.
- Sophomore Mike Renner led the team in passing yards (631) and total offense (824 yards).
- Junior wide receiver Scott Stevens led the team with 23 receptions for 284 yards.

=== Schedule ===
| Date | Opponent | Site | Result | Attendance | Source |
|---|---|---|---|---|---|
| September 6 | at Northwood | Midland, MI | L 14–41 | | |
| September 13 | Ferris State | Hubbell Field; Houghton, MI | T 7–7 | 2,000–2,500 | |
| September 20 | vs. Alma* | Pontiac Silverdome; Pontiac, MI | W 14–10 | | |
| September 27 | Grand Valley State | Hubbell Field; Houghton, MI | L 6–44 | 2,500–2,800 | |
| October 4 | St. Olaf* | Hubbell Field; Houghton, MI | L 20–30 | 3,500 | |
| October 11 | at Wayne State (MI) | Tartar Stadium; Detroit, MI | L 8–35 | 1,500 | |
| October 18 | at Hillsdale | Hillsdale, MI | L 6–7 | | |
| October 25 | Bemidji State* | Hubbell Field; Houghton, MI | W 39–0 | 500 | |
| November 1 | Saginaw Valley State | Hubbell Field; Houghton, MI | L 3–34 | 500 | |
*Non-conference game

== 1981 ==
1981 Michigan Tech Huskies football
- Conference: Great Lakes Intercollegiate Athletic Conference
- Record: 1–8 (0–6 GLIAC)
- Head coach: Ron Marciel (1st season)
- Home stadium: Sherman Field

1981 Great Lakes Intercollegiate Athletic Conference football standings
| | Conf. | | | | | Overall |
| Team | W | | L | | T | W | | L | | T |
|---|---|---|---|---|---|---|---|---|---|---|
| Grand Valley State $ | 6 | – | 0 | – | 0 | 7 | – | 2 | – | 0 |
| No. 3 Hillsdale ^ | 5 | – | 1 | – | 0 | 10 | – | 2 | – | 0 |
| Ferris State | 3 | – | 3 | – | 0 | 4 | – | 4 | – | 0 |
| Wayne State (MI) | 3 | – | 3 | – | 0 | 4 | – | 5 | – | 0 |
| Northwood | 2 | – | 4 | – | 0 | 4 | – | 6 | – | 0 |
| Saginaw Valley State | 2 | – | 4 | – | 0 | 3 | – | 7 | – | 0 |
| Michigan Tech | 0 | – | 6 | – | 0 | 1 | – | 8 | – | 0 |
$ – Conference champion; ^ – NAIA Division I playoff participant; Rankings from NAIA Division I poll

The 1981 Michigan Tech Huskies football team represented Michigan Technological University as a member of the Great Lakes Intercollegiate Athletic Conference (GLIAC) during the 1981 NCAA Division II football season. In their first year under head coach Ron Marciel, the Huskies compiled a 1–8 record (0–6 in conference games), finished in last place in the GLIAC, and were outscored by a total of 244 to 116.

The team's individual statistical leaders included:

- Senior fullback Bill Matkin led the team in rushing with 162 yards on 44 carries. He also led the team with 30 points scored.
- Sophomore quarterback Steve Hoffman led the team with 1,517 passing yards.
- Sophomore wide receiver Ian Brooks led the team with 46 catches for 607 yards.

=== Schedule ===
| Date | Opponent | Site | Result | Attendance | Source |
|---|---|---|---|---|---|
| September 12 | Northwood | Sherman Field; Houghton, MI | L 7–10 | 2,000 | |
| September 19 | vs. Alma* | Pontiac Silverdome; Pontiac, MI | W 42–27 | 4,950 | |
| September 26 | at Ferris State | Big Rapids, MI | L 6–27 | 8,500 | |
| October 3 | at Grand Valley State | Lubbers Stadium; Allendale, MI | L 5–52 | 5,500 | |
| October 10 | at St. Olaf* | Northfield, MN | L 0–14 | 2,000 | |
| October 17 | Wayne State (MI) | Sherman Field; Houghton, MI | L 13–16 | 1,500 | |
| October 24 | Hillsdale | Sherman Field; Houghton, MI | L 14–36 | 500 | |
| October 31 | at No. 2 Northern Michigan* | Marquette, MI | L 15–44 | 4,600–4,738 | |
| November 7 | at Saginaw Valley State | Saginaw, MI | L 13–18 | 1,500 | |
*Non-conference game; Rankings from NCAA Division II Football Committee Poll released prior to the game

== 1982 ==
1982 Michigan Tech Huskies football
- Conference: Great Lakes Intercollegiate Athletic Conference
- Record: 1–8 (1–5 GLIAC)
- Head coach: Ron Marciel (2nd season)
- Home stadium: Sherman Field

1982 Great Lakes Intercollegiate Athletic Conference football standings
| | Conf. | | | | | Overall |
| Team | W | | L | | T | W | | L | | T |
|---|---|---|---|---|---|---|---|---|---|---|
| No. 1 Hillsdale $^ | 6 | – | 0 | – | 0 | 12 | – | 1 | – | 0 |
| Grand Valley State | 5 | – | 1 | – | 0 | 7 | – | 3 | – | 0 |
| Northwood | 4 | – | 2 | – | 0 | 6 | – | 4 | – | 0 |
| Wayne State (MI) | 2 | – | 4 | – | 0 | 3 | – | 7 | – | 0 |
| Ferris State | 2 | – | 4 | – | 0 | 2 | – | 6 | – | 0 |
| Michigan Tech | 1 | – | 5 | – | 0 | 1 | – | 8 | – | 0 |
| Saginaw Valley State | 1 | – | 5 | – | 0 | 1 | – | 9 | – | 0 |
$ – Conference champion; ^ – NAIA Division I playoff participant; Rankings from NAIA Division I poll

The 1982 Michigan Tech Huskies football team represented Michigan Technological University as a member of the Great Lakes Intercollegiate Athletic Conference (GLIAC) during the 1982 NCAA Division II football season. In their second year under head coach Ron Marciel, the Huskies compiled a 1–8 record (1–5 in conference games), tied for last place in the GLIAC, and were outscored by a total of 289 to 160.

=== Schedule ===
| Date | Opponent | Site | Result | Attendance | Source |
|---|---|---|---|---|---|
| September 18 | at Alma* | Alma, MI | L 21–27 | | |
| September 25 | Northern Michigan* | Sherman Field; Houghton, MI | L 19–50 | | |
| October 2 | at Northwood | Midland, MI | L 13–14 | | |
| October 9 | Saginaw Valley State | Sherman Field; Houghton, MI | W 24–10 | | |
| October 16 | at Wayne State (MI) | Detroit, MI | L 20–45 | | |
| October 23 | Ferris State | Sherman Field; Houghton, MI | L 20–33 | | |
| October 30 | Grand Valley State | Sherman Field; Houghton, MI | L 28–35 | 589 | |
| November 6 | at Hillsdale | Hillsdale, MI | L 0–51 | | |
| November 13 | St. Norbert* | Sherman Field; Houghton, MI | L 15–24 | | |
*Non-conference game

== 1983 ==
1983 Michigan Tech Huskies football
- Conference: Great Lakes Intercollegiate Athletic Conference
- Record: 3–7 (1–5 GLIAC)
- Head coach: Ron Marciel (3rd season)
- Home stadium: Sherman Field

1983 Great Lakes Intercollegiate Athletic Conference football standings
| | Conf. | | | | | Overall |
| Team | W | | L | | T | W | | L | | T |
|---|---|---|---|---|---|---|---|---|---|---|
| No. 7 Saginaw Valley State $^ | 6 | – | 0 | – | 0 | 9 | – | 3 | – | 0 |
| No. 8 Hillsdale | 4 | – | 2 | – | 0 | 8 | – | 2 | – | 0 |
| Wayne State (MI) | 4 | – | 2 | – | 0 | 7 | – | 3 | – | 0 |
| Northwood | 3 | – | 3 | – | 0 | 4 | – | 4 | – | 0 |
| Grand Valley State | 3 | – | 3 | – | 0 | 4 | – | 6 | – | 0 |
| Michigan Tech | 1 | – | 5 | – | 0 | 3 | – | 7 | – | 0 |
| Ferris State | 0 | – | 6 | – | 0 | 0 | – | 9 | – | 0 |
$ – Conference champion; ^ – NAIA Division I playoff participant; Rankings from NAIA Division I poll

The 1983 Michigan Tech Huskies football team represented Michigan Technological University as a member of the Great Lakes Intercollegiate Athletic Conference (GLIAC) during the 1983 NCAA Division II football season. In their third year under head coach Ron Marciel, the Huskies compiled a 3–7 record (1–5 in conference games), finished sixth in the GLIAC, and were outscored by a total of 289 to 232.

=== Schedule ===
| Date | Opponent | Site | Result | Attendance | Source |
|---|---|---|---|---|---|
| September 3 | at North Dakota* | Grand Forks, ND | L 7–55 | | |
| September 17 | Alma* | Sherman Field; Houghton, MI | W 36–0 | | |
| September 24 | at Northern Michigan* | Marquette, MI | L 21–28 | | |
| October 1 | Northwood | Sherman Field; Houghton, MI | L 25–35 | | |
| October 8 | at Saginaw Valley State | Saginaw, MI | L 15–35 | | |
| October 15 | Wayne State (MI) | Sherman Field; Houghton, MI | L 7–23 | | |
| October 22 | at Ferris State | Big Rapids, MI | W 31–28 | | |
| October 29 | at Grand Valley State | Lubbers Stadium; Allendale, MI | L 34–36 | 3,177 | |
| November 5 | Hillsdale | Sherman Field; Houghton, MI | L 0–36 | | |
| November 12 | at St. Norbert* | De Pere, WI | W 56–13 | | |
*Non-conference game

== 1984 ==
1984 Michigan Tech Huskies football
- Conference: Great Lakes Intercollegiate Athletic Conference
- Record: 4–6 (2–4 GLIAC)
- Head coach: Ron Marciel (4th season)
- Home stadium: Sherman Field

1984 Great Lakes Intercollegiate Athletic Conference football standings
| | Conf. | | | | | Overall |
| Team | W | | L | | T | W | | L | | T |
|---|---|---|---|---|---|---|---|---|---|---|
| No. 6 Saginaw Valley State $^ | 6 | – | 0 | – | 0 | 8 | – | 3 | – | 0 |
| No. 17 Northwood | 5 | – | 1 | – | 0 | 6 | – | 3 | – | 0 |
| Wayne State (MI) | 4 | – | 2 | – | 0 | 6 | – | 5 | – | 0 |
| Hillsdale | 3 | – | 3 | – | 0 | 6 | – | 4 | – | 0 |
| Michigan Tech | 2 | – | 4 | – | 0 | 4 | – | 6 | – | 0 |
| Ferris State | 1 | – | 5 | – | 0 | 2 | – | 8 | – | 0 |
| Grand Valley State | 0 | – | 6 | – | 0 | 0 | – | 10 | – | 0 |
$ – Conference champion; ^ – NAIA Division I playoff participant; Rankings from NAIA Division I poll

The 1984 Michigan Tech Huskies football team represented Michigan Technological University as a member of the Great Lakes Intercollegiate Athletic Conference (GLIAC) during the 1984 NCAA Division II football season. In their fourth and final year under head coach Ron Marciel, the Huskies compiled a 4–6 record (2–4 in conference games), finished fifth in the GLIAC, and were outscored by a total of 325 to 288.

The team's individual statistical leaders included:

- Sophomore quarterback Dave Walter led the team in passing with 1,603 yards, completing 121 of 244 attempts with 12 interceptions and 12 touchdowns. He also led the team in total offense with 1,603 yards, including 685 rushing yards. He was also the leading scorer with 54 points on nine touchdowns.
- Junior running back John Magill led the team in rushing with 733 yards and eight touchdowns on 131 carries.
- Junior split end Bill Hauswirth was the leading receiver with 28 catches for 484 yards and seven touchdowns.

=== Schedule ===
| Date | Opponent | Site | Result | Attendance | Source |
|---|---|---|---|---|---|
| September 1 | at North Dakota | Grand Forks, ND | L 13–42 | 5,100 | |
| September 15 | at St. Norbert | De Pere, WI | W 41–13 | | |
| September 22 | Lakeland | Houghton, MI | W 56–3 | 1,086 | |
| September 29 | at Hillsdale | Hillsdale, MI | L 6–24 | 4,552 | |
| October 6 | at Wayne State | Detroit, MI | L 20–57 | 972 | |
| October 13 | Ferris State | Houghton, MI | W 48–22 | 1,396 | |
| October 20 | Grand Valley State | Houghton, MI | W 27–20 | 599 | |
| October 27 | at Northwood | Midland, MI | L 21–38 | | |
| November 3 | Saginaw Valley State | Houghton, MI | L 28–50 | 521 | |
| November 10 | at Northern Michigan | Marquette, MI | L 28–55 | 735 | |

== 1985 ==
1985 Michigan Tech Huskies football
- Conference: Great Lakes Intercollegiate Athletic Conference
- Record: 1–9 (0-6 GLIAC)
- Head coach: Tom Danna (1st season)
- Home stadium: Sherman Field

1985 Great Lakes Intercollegiate Athletic Conference football standings
| | Conf. | | | | | Overall |
| Team | W | | L | | T | W | | L | | T |
|---|---|---|---|---|---|---|---|---|---|---|
| No. 2 Hillsdale $^ | 5 | – | 1 | – | 0 | 11 | – | 1 | – | 1 |
| Saginaw Valley State | 4 | – | 1 | – | 1 | 4 | – | 5 | – | 1 |
| Ferris State | 4 | – | 2 | – | 0 | 6 | – | 4 | – | 0 |
| Grand Valley State | 4 | – | 2 | – | 0 | 6 | – | 5 | – | 0 |
| Northwood | 2 | – | 3 | – | 1 | 3 | – | 4 | – | 2 |
| Wayne State (MI) | 1 | – | 5 | – | 0 | 1 | – | 8 | – | 1 |
| Michigan Tech | 0 | – | 6 | – | 0 | 1 | – | 9 | – | 0 |
$ – Conference champion; ^ – NAIA Division I playoff participant; Rankings from NAIA Division I poll

The 1985 Michigan Tech Huskies football team represented Michigan Technological University as a member of the Great Lakes Intercollegiate Athletic Conference (GLIAC) during the 1985 NCAA Division II football season. In their first year under head coach Tom Danna, the Huskies compiled a 1–9 record (0–6 in conference games), finished last in the GLIAC, and were outscored by a total of 379 to 166.

=== Schedule ===
| Date | Opponent | Site | Result | Attendance | Source |
|---|---|---|---|---|---|
| September 7 | Ferris State | | L 7–28 | | |
| September 14 | St. Norbert* | Houghton, MI | W 22–21 | | |
| September 21 | at Western Illinois* | Hanson Field; Macomb, IL | L 20–55 | | |
| September 29 | Northwood | | L 28–38 | | |
| October 5 | at Saginaw Valley State | | L 21–51 | | |
| October 12 | Wayne State (MI) | | L 12–30 | | |
| October 19 | Ferris State | | L 14–21 | | |
| October 26 | Grand Valley State | Houghton, MI | L 22–42 | 470 | |
| November 2 | at Hillsdale | Frank "Muddy" Waters Stadium; Hillsdale, MI | L 6–52 | 3,522 | |
| November 9 | Northern Michigan* | | L 14–41 | | |
*Non-conference game

== 1986 ==
1986 Michigan Tech Huskies football
- Conference: Independent
- Record: 2–7
- Head coach: Tom Danna (2nd season)
- Home stadium: Sherman Field

1986 NCAA Division II independents football records
| | Conf. | | | Overall |
| Team | W | L | T | W | | L | | T |
|---|---|---|---|---|---|---|---|---|
| No. 4 Central State (OH) ^ | | – | | 10 | – | 1 | – | 1 |
| No. T–18 New Haven | | – | | 8 | – | 2 | – | 0 |
| No. 7 Towson State ^ | | – | | 8 | – | 3 | – | 1 |
| Southern Connecticut State | | – | | 7 | – | 3 | – | 0 |
| American International | | – | | 6 | – | 4 | – | 0 |
| UCF | | – | | 6 | – | 5 | – | 0 |
| Northern Michigan | | – | | 5 | – | 5 | – | 0 |
| Saint Mary's | | – | | 5 | – | 5 | – | 0 |
| Springfield | | – | | 4 | – | 5 | – | 0 |
| Michigan Tech | | – | | 3 | – | 6 | – | 0 |
| Kentucky State | | – | | 1 | – | 9 | – | 0 |
| Liberty | | – | | 1 | – | 9 | – | 0 |
| Central Connecticut | | – | | 0 | – | 10 | – | 0 |
^ – NCAA Division II playoff participant; Rankings from NCAA Division II Football Committee poll

The 1986 Michigan Tech Huskies football team represented Michigan Technological University as an independent during the 1986 NCAA Division II football season. In their second and final year under head coach Tom Danna, the Huskies compiled a 2–7 record and were outscored by a total of 294 to 207. Senior quarterback Dave Walter led the team in rushing (572 yards), passing (2,131 yards), and total offense (2,703 yards). Senior split end T J Chiesa was the leading receiver with 61 catches for 1,027 yards.

=== Schedule ===
| Date | Opponent | Site | Result | Attendance | Source |
|---|---|---|---|---|---|
| September 13 | at St. Norbert | De Pere, WI | W 34–30 | 1,948 | |
| September 20 | Minnesota-Duluth | Houghton, MI | L 15–31 | 785 | |
| September 27 | Northwood | Houghton, MI | W 28–14 | 457 | |
| October 4 | at Adrian | Adrian, MI | L 23–25 | 1,000 | |
| October 11 | Moorhead State | Houghton, MI | L 17–21 | 827 | |
| October 18 | at Ferris State | Big Rapids, MI | L 41–55 | 1,200 | |
| November 1 | Hillsdale | Houghton, MI | L 14–35 | 489 | |
| November 8 | at Minnesota-Morris | Morris, MN | L 13–48 | 500 | |
| November 15 | vs. Northern State (SD) | Minneapolis, MN | L 22–35 | 2,500 | |

== 1987 ==
1987 Michigan Tech Huskies football
- Conference: Independent
- Record: 1–8
- Head coach: Bernie Anderson (1st season)
- Home stadium: Sherman Field

1987 NCAA Division II independents football records
| | Conf. | | | Overall |
| Team | W | L | T | W | | L | | T |
|---|---|---|---|---|---|---|---|---|
| No. 16 New Haven | | – | | 8 | – | 2 | – | 0 |
| Saint Mary's | | – | | 8 | – | 3 | – | 0 |
| No. 11 UCF ^ | | – | | 9 | – | 4 | – | 0 |
| Springfield | | – | | 5 | – | 3 | – | 1 |
| Central Connecticut | | – | | 4 | – | 4 | – | 1 |
| American International | | – | | 3 | – | 5 | – | 2 |
| Liberty | | – | | 3 | – | 7 | – | 0 |
| Kentucky State | | – | | 2 | – | 8 | – | 1 |
| Michigan Tech | | – | | 2 | – | 7 | – | 0 |
| Southern Connecticut State | | – | | 1 | – | 9 | – | 0 |
^ – NCAA Division II playoff participant; Rankings from NCAA Division II Football Committee poll

The 1987 Michigan Tech Huskies football team represented Michigan Technological University as an independent during the 1987 NCAA Division II football season. In their first year under head coach Bernie Anderson, the Huskies compiled a 1–8 record and were outscored by a total of 317 to 126.

The team's statistical leaders included junior running back Mike Rybicki with 643 rushing yards; freshman quarterback Mark Miller with 534 passing yards and 42 points scored; and junior flanker Jim Wallace with 18 receptions for 327 yards.

=== Schedule ===
| Date | Opponent | Site | Result | Attendance | Source |
|---|---|---|---|---|---|
| September 5 | at Northern Michigan | Marquette, MI | L 3–55 | | |
| September 12 | St. Norbert | Houghton, MI | W 31–17 | | |
| September 19 | at Minnesota-Duluth | Duluth, MN | L 10–41 | | |
| September 26 | Ferris State | Houghton, MI | L 3–27 | | |
| October 3 | at Northwood | Midland, MI | L 16–34 | | |
| October 10 | at Moorhead State | Moorhead, MI | L 14–38 | | |
| October 17 | Wayne State | Houghton, MI | L 22–29 | | |
| October 24 | at Wisconsin-Oshkosh | Oshkosh, WI | L 3–34 | | |
| November 7 | Minnesota-Morris | Houghton, MI | L 24–42 | | |

== 1988 ==
1988 Michigan Tech Huskies football
- Conference: Independent
- Record: 6–4
- Head coach: Bernie Anderson (2nd season)
- Home stadium: Sherman Field

1988 NCAA Division II independents football records
| | Conf. | | | Overall |
| Team | W | L | T | W | | L | | T |
|---|---|---|---|---|---|---|---|---|
| Saint Mary's | | – | | 10 | – | 0 | – | 0 |
| New Haven | | – | | 7 | – | 3 | – | 0 |
| Springfield | | – | | 6 | – | 3 | – | 1 |
| Central Connecticut | | – | | 5 | – | 3 | – | 1 |
| Michigan Tech | | – | | 6 | – | 4 | – | 0 |
| UCF | | – | | 6 | – | 5 | – | 0 |
| American International | | – | | 5 | – | 5 | – | 0 |
| Wofford | | – | | 5 | – | 5 | – | 0 |
| Kentucky State | | – | | 4 | – | 7 | – | 0 |
| Southern Connecticut State | | – | | 0 | – | 10 | – | 0 |

The 1988 Michigan Tech Huskies football team represented Michigan Technological University as an independent during the 1988 NCAA Division II football season. In their second year under head coach Bernie Anderson, the Huskies compiled a 6–4 record and were outscored by a total of 240 to 227.

The team's statistical leaders included senior fullback Mike Rybicki with 930 rushing yards and 66 points scored; sophomore quarterback Jim Stewart with 976 passing yards; and sophomore tight end Dan Martin with 20 receptions for 336 yards.

=== Schedule ===
| Date | Opponent | Site | Result | Attendance | Source |
|---|---|---|---|---|---|
| September 10 | Wilmington (OH) | Houghton, MI | W 20–15 | 1,304 | |
| September 17 | at Hope | Holland, MI | W 17–14 | 2,908 | |
| September 24 | at Ferris State | Big Rapids, MI | L 15–21 | 3,775 | |
| October 1 | Northwood | Houghton, MI | W 31–13 | 688 | |
| October 8 | Bemidji State | Houghton, MI | W 28–14 | 695 | |
| October 15 | at Winona State | Winona, MN | L 24–25 | 2,000 | |
| October 22 | Minnesota-Duluth | Houghton, MI | L 0–41 | 2,011 | |
| October 29 | at Minnesota-Morris | Morris, MN | W 43–42 | 950 | |
| November 5 | St. Norbert | Houghton, MI | W 28–13 | 377 | |
| November 12 | vs. Moorhead State | Minneapolis, MN (Metrodome Classic) | L 21–42 | 3,500 | |

== 1989 ==
1989 Michigan Tech Huskies football
- Conference: Independent
- Record: 2–7
- Head coach: Bernie Anderson (3rd season)
- Home stadium: Sherman Field

1989 NCAA Division II independents football records
| | Conf. | | | Overall |
| Team | W | L | T | W | | L | | T |
|---|---|---|---|---|---|---|---|---|
| No. T–12 New Haven | | – | | 8 | – | 2 | – | 0 |
| No. 19 American International | | – | | 7 | – | 3 | – | 0 |
| UCF | | – | | 7 | – | 3 | – | 0 |
| Saint Mary's | | – | | 6 | – | 4 | – | 0 |
| Wofford | | – | | 6 | – | 5 | – | 0 |
| Central Connecticut | | – | | 5 | – | 5 | – | 0 |
| Springfield | | – | | 4 | – | 6 | – | 0 |
| Southern Connecticut State | | – | | 3 | – | 7 | – | 0 |
| Michigan Tech | | – | | 2 | – | 7 | – | 0 |
| Kentucky State | | – | | 2 | – | 9 | – | 0 |
Rankings from NCAA Division II Football Committee poll

The 1989 Michigan Tech Huskies football team represented Michigan Technological University as an independent during the 1989 NCAA Division II football season. In their third year under head coach Bernie Anderson, the Huskies compiled a 2–7 record and were outscored by a total of 203 to 147.

The team's statistical leaders included junior running back freshman quarterback Kurt Coduti with 962 rushing yards; Mark Kieliszewski with 446 rushing yards and 30 points scored; and junior tight end Dan Martin with 36 receptions for 439 yards.

=== Schedule ===
| Date | Opponent | Site | Result | Attendance | Source |
|---|---|---|---|---|---|
| September 9 | at Wilmington (OH) | Wilmington, OH | W 21–17 | 2,400 | |
| September 16 | Hope | Houghton, MI | W 12–6 | 1,208 | |
| September 23 | Ferris State | Houghton, MI | L 20–35 | 766 | |
| September 30 | at Northwood | Midland, MI | L 14–16 | 1,500 | |
| October 7 | at Bemidji State | Bemidji, MN | L 14–26 | 1,100 | |
| October 14 | Winona State | Houghton, MI | L 16–18 | 3,051 | |
| October 21 | at Minnesota-Duluth | Duluth, MN | L 7–31 | 1,962 | |
| October 28 | Minnesota-Morris | Houghton, MI | L 20–22 | 955 | |
| November 4 | at St. Norbert | De Pere, WI | L 23–32 | 1,089 | |
