= Morgan Hout =

American football coach

Biographical details
- Born: 1947
- Died: November 1, 2023 (aged 76)

Coaching career (HC unless noted)
- 1974–1976: Maryland (GA)
- 1977–1979: Maryland (WR)
- 1980–1983: Richmond (WR)
- 1984–1988: Liberty
- 1989: Baylor (volunteer WR)

Head coaching record
- Overall: 20–29–1

Morgan Hout (born 1947 – November 1, 2023) was an American college football coach. He served as the football coach at Liberty University from 1984 to 1988, compiling a record of 20–29–1.

== Coaching career ==
A graduate of Tennessee Temple University, Hout began his college coaching career working for three years as an unpaid assistant for head coach Jerry Claiborne at the University of Maryland, College Park. After a total of six years at Maryland, Hout spent several years as an assistant coach at University of Richmond.

In 1984, he was offered the head coaching job at Liberty University. He hired strength and conditioning coach Dave Williams from Texas A&M University. He coached a number of players who went on to National Football League (NFL), including Fred Banks, Kelvin Edwards, and Pro Bowlers Eric Green and Wayne Haddix.

In 1988, Hout posted his best ever record of 8–3, with all three losses by a combined total of five points. As a result of this breakthrough season, Hout was named Virginia Division I Coach of the Year. However, in a move that was widely questioned and criticized, Hout was "promoted" to assistant athletic director to make room for former NFL head coach Sam Rutigliano. Hout declined the "promotion" and instead accepted a position at Baylor University. Considering the success the Flames were enjoying on the field, Hout's removal caused a bit of controversy at the school.

== Head coaching record ==
Year	Team	Overall	Conference	Standing	Bowl/playoffs
Liberty Flames (NCAA Division II independent) (1984–1987)
1984	Liberty	5–6			
1985	Liberty	3–4–1			
1986	Liberty	1–9			
1987	Liberty	3–7			
Liberty Flames (NCAA Division I-AA independent) (1988)
1988	Liberty	8–3			
Liberty:		20–29–1			
Total:		20–29–1			
