= Tom Danna =

American football coach (1946–2003)

Biographical details
- Born: February 19, 1946
- Died: January 26, 2003 (aged 56); Flint, Michigan, U.S.

Coaching career (HC unless noted)
- 1976–1981: Michigan Tech (assistant)
- 1984: James Madison (OL)
- 1985–1986: Michigan Tech
- 1987–1992: Northwood

Head coaching record
- Overall: 19–56

Thomas S. Danna (February 19, 1946 – January 26, 2003) was an American college football coach. He served as the head football coach at Michigan Technological University from 1985 to 1986 and at Northwood University in Midland, Michigan from 1987 to 1992, compiling a career head coaching record of 19–56. Danna played college football at Eastern Michigan University before embarking on a coaching career.

== Head coaching record ==
Year	Team	Overall	Conference	Standing	Bowl/playoffs
Michigan Tech Huskies (Great Lakes Intercollegiate Athletic Conference) (1985)
1985	Michigan Tech	1–9	0–6	7th	
Michigan Tech Huskies (NCAA Division II independent) (1986)
1986	Michigan Tech	3–6			
Michigan Tech:		4–15			
Northwood Timberwolves (NAIA Division I independent) (1987–1991)
1987	Northwood	1–8			
1988	Northwood	2–8			
1989	Northwood	5–5			
1990	Northwood	5–5			
1991	Northwood	2–6			
Northwood Timberwolves (NCAA Division II independent) (1992)
1992	Northwood	0–9			
Northwood:		15–41			
Total:		19–56			
