= 1986 Liberty Flames football team =

American college football season

1986 Liberty Flames football
- Conference: Independent
- Record: 1–9
- Head coach: Morgan Hout (3rd season)
- Home stadium: City Stadium

1986 NCAA Division II independents football records
	Conf.			Overall
Team	W	L	T	W		L		T
No. 4 Central State (OH) ^		–		10	–	1	–	1
No. T–18 New Haven		–		8	–	2	–	0
No. 7 Towson State ^		–		8	–	3	–	1
Southern Connecticut State		–		7	–	3	–	0
American International		–		6	–	4	–	0
UCF		–		6	–	5	–	0
Northern Michigan		–		5	–	5	–	0
Saint Mary's		–		5	–	5	–	0
Springfield		–		4	–	5	–	0
Michigan Tech		–		3	–	6	–	0
Kentucky State		–		1	–	9	–	0
Liberty		–		1	–	9	–	0
Central Connecticut		–		0	–	10	–	0
^ – NCAA Division II playoff participant; Rankings from NCAA Division II Football Committee poll

The 1986 Liberty Flames football team represented Liberty University as an independent during the 1986 NCAA Division II football season. Led by third-year head coach Morgan Hout, the Flames compiled an overall record of 1–9.

== Schedule ==
Date	Opponent	Site	Result	Attendance	Source
September 6	at West Georgia	Grisham Stadium; Carrollton, GA	L 17–21	6,092	
September 13	at Mars Hill	Meares Stadium; Mars Hill, NC	L 0–15	4,627	
September 20	James Madison	City Stadium; Lynchburg, VA	W 17–7	7,853	
September 27	Wofford	City Stadium; Lynchburg, VA	L 6–17	3,257	
October 4	at No. 16 (I-AA) Eastern Illinois	O'Brien Stadium; Charleston, IL	L 15–40	6,850	
October 11	at Towson State	Minnegan Stadium; Towson, MD	L 10–12	5,849	
October 18	Southern Connecticut State^{†}	City Stadium; Lynchburg, VA	L 21–27	7,195	
October 25	at Newberry	Setzler Field; Newberry, SC	L 21–23	1,500	
November 8	at Carson–Newman	Burke–Tarr Stadium; Jefferson City, TN	L 20–34	5,483	
November 15	No. 7 Elon	City Stadium; Lynchburg, VA	L 23–33	2,352	
^{†}Homecoming; Rankings from NCAA Division II Football Committee Poll released prior to the game
