= Tom Beck (American football, born 1940) =

American football player and coach (born 1940)

Biographical details
- Born: December 21, 1940 (age 85); Chicago, Illinois, U.S.

Playing career
- 1959–1961: Northern Illinois
- Positions: Quarterback, halfback

Coaching career (HC unless noted)
- 1962–1964: West Leyden HS (IL)
- 1965–1966: Lake Zurich HS (IL)
- 1970–1974: St. Procopius / Illinois Benedictine
- 1975: Northern Illinois (OC)
- 1976–1983: Elmhurst
- 1984: Chicago Blitz (assistant)
- 1985–1990: Grand Valley State
- 1991: Notre Dame (OC)
- 1992: Illinois (OC/QB)

Head coaching record
- Overall: 137–52–1 (college)
- Tournaments: 0–2 (NCAA D-II playoffs)

Accomplishments and honors

Championships
- 1 CCIW (1978); 1 GLIAC (1989); 1 MIFC (1990)

Awards
- 2× NAIA District 20 Coach of the Year (1972, 1974); 2× CCIW Coach of the Year (1978, 1980); 2× NCAA Regional Coach of the Year (1989–1990); GLIAC Coach of the Year (1990); MIFC Coach of the Year (1991)
- College Football Hall of Fame; Inducted in 2004 (profile)

Tom Beck (born December 21, 1940) is an American former football player and coach. He served as the head football coach at Illinois Benedictine College—now Benedictine University—from 1970 to 1974, Elmhurst College from 1976 to 1983, and Grand Valley State University from 1985 to 1990. During his college football head coaching career, he compiled a 137–52–1 record, a .724 winning percentage. All three institutions where Beck coached had historically losing teams before he turned them into nationally ranked programs. Beck was inducted into the College Football Hall of Fame as a coach in 2004.

Beck played football at Northern Illinois University, where he started on offense, defense, and played special teams. He was the last two-way player in the history of Northern Illinois Huskies football. Beck was All-Conference on both offense and defense, an Academic All-American, and was inducted into the Northern Illinois University Athletics Hall of Fame. He has also been inducted into the athletic hall of fame at Elmhurst College, Benedictine University, and Grand Valley State University as a coach.

Beck served as the offensive coordinator at Northern Illinois University in 1975, at the University of Notre Dame in 1990, and at the University of Illinois at Urbana–Champaign in 1991. He coached one season in 1984 with the Chicago Blitz of the United States Football League (USFL) before the league folded. While head coach at Grand Valley State, Beck gave Brian Kelly his first coaching job as a graduate assistant. Kelly was Beck's successor at Grand Valley State in 1991.

After his coaching career, Beck spent time as a scout for the National Football League's Buffalo Bills and Chicago Bears. After scouting, he was an analyst for nine years for two different web sites, IrishEyes and Irish Today, that covered Notre Dame football.

== Head coaching record ==
=== College ===
Year	Team	Overall	Conference	Standing	Bowl/playoffs	NAIA/NCAA^{#}
St. Procopius Eagles (Gateway Conference) (1970)
1970	St. Procopius	6–3	2–1	3rd		
Illinois Benedictine Eagles (Northern Illinois-Iowa Conference) (1971–1974)
1971	Illinois Benedictine	8–2				
1972	Illinois Benedictine	9–2				
1973	Illinois Benedictine	7–3				
1974	Illinois Benedictine	7–2–1				
Illinois Benedictine:		37–12–1				
Elmhurst Bluejays (College Conference of Illinois and Wisconsin) (1976–1983)
1976	Elmhurst	2–7	1–7	8th		
1977	Elmhurst	5–4	4–4	T–4th		
1978	Elmhurst	8–1	7–1	T–1st		11
1979	Elmhurst	7–2	6–2	T–2nd		
1980	Elmhurst	7–2	6–2	T–1st		
1981	Elmhurst	8–1	7–1	2nd		
1982	Elmhurst	6–3	5–3	4th		
1983	Elmhurst	7–2	6–2	2nd		
Elmhurst:		50–22	42–22			
Grand Valley State Lakers (Great Lakes Intercollegiate Athletic Conference) (1985–1989)
1985	Grand Valley State	6–5	4–2	T–3rd		
1986	Grand Valley State	9–2	4–1	2nd		17
1987	Grand Valley State	7–4	4–1	2nd		
1988	Grand Valley State	7–4	3–2	3rd		
1989	Grand Valley State	11–1	5–0	1st	L NCAA Division II First Round	3
Grand Valley State Lakers (Midwest Intercollegiate Football Conference) (1990)
1990	Grand Valley State	10–2	9–1	1st	L NCAA Division II First Round	6
Grand Valley State:		50–18	29–7			
Total:		137–52–1				
National championship Conference title Conference division title or championship game berth
^{#}Rankings from final NAIA Division II poll for Elmhurst and final NCAA Division II Football Committee poll for Grand Valley State.
