= 1986 Jacksonville State Gamecocks football team =

American college football season

1986 Jacksonville State Gamecocks football
- Conference: Gulf South Conference
- Record: 5–4–1 (4–3–1 GSC)
- Head coach: Bill Burgess (2nd season)
- Offensive coordinator: Charles Maniscalco (2nd season)
- Defensive coordinator: Eddie Garfinkle (1st season)
- Home stadium: Paul Snow Stadium

1986 Gulf South Conference football standings
	Conf.					Overall
Team	W		L		T	W		L		T
No. 3 Troy State $^	8	–	0	–	0	10	–	2	–	0
No. 13 Valdosta State	7	–	1	–	0	9	–	2	–	0
Mississippi College	5	–	3	–	0	7	–	4	–	0
Delta State	4	–	3	–	1	6	–	4	–	1
Jacksonville State	4	–	3	–	1	5	–	4	–	1
West Georgia	2	–	6	–	0	4	–	7	–	0
Livingston	2	–	6	–	0	3	–	8	–	0
Tennessee–Martin	2	–	6	–	0	3	–	8	–	0
North Alabama	1	–	7	–	0	4	–	7	–	0
$ – Conference champion; ^ – NCAA Division II playoff participant; Rankings from NCAA Division II Football Committee poll

The 1986 Jacksonville State Gamecocks football team represented Jacksonville State University as a member of the Gulf South Conference (GSC) during the 1986 NCAA Division II football season. Led by second-year head coach Bill Burgess, the Gamecocks compiled an overall record of 5–4–1 with a mark of 4–3–1 in conference play, and finished tied for fourth in the GSC.

== Schedule ==
Date	Opponent	Site	Result	Attendance	Source
September 6	Newberry*	Paul Snow Stadium; Jacksonville, AL	W 27–21	7,000	
September 13	at Alabama A&M*	Milton Frank Stadium; Huntsville, AL	L 7–14	9,000	
September 27	West Georgia	Paul Snow Stadium; Jacksonville, AL	W 52–34	10,000	
October 4	at No. 20 Valdosta State	Cleveland Field; Valdosta, GA	L 25–29	5,500	
October 11	No. 6 Mississippi College	Paul Snow Stadium; Jacksonville, AL	L 14–28	5,000	
October 18	at Delta State	Delta Field; Cleveland, MS	T 14–14	3,000	
October 25	North Alabama	Paul Snow Stadium; Jacksonville, AL	W 29–26	5,000	
November 1	at Tennessee–Martin	Pacer Stadium; Martin, TN	W 30–20	6,350	
November 15	No. 3 Troy State	Paul Snow Stadium; Jacksonville, AL (rivalry)	L 43–45	9,000	
November 22	at Livingston	Tiger Stadium; Livingston, AL	W 38–33	2,000	
*Non-conference game; Rankings from NCAA Division II Football Committee Poll released prior to the game
