= 1986 Chico State Wildcats football team =

American college football season

1986 Chico State Wildcats football
- Conference: Northern California Athletic Conference
- Record: 7–3 (4–1 NCAC)
- Head coach: Mike Bellotti (3rd season)
- Offensive coordinator: Nick Aliotti (3rd season)
- Home stadium: University Stadium

1986 Northern California Athletic Conference football standings
	Conf.					Overall
Team	W		L		T	W		L		T
No. 2 UC Davis $^	5	–	0	–	0	10	–	1	–	0
Chico State	4	–	1	–	0	7	–	3	–	0
Cal State Hayward	3	–	2	–	0	7	–	3	–	0
Sonoma State	2	–	3	–	0	4	–	6	–	0
San Francisco State	1	–	4	–	0	2	–	9	–	0
Humboldt State	0	–	5	–	0	2	–	9	–	0
$ – Conference champion; ^ – NCAA Division II playoff participant; Rankings from NCAA Division II Football Committee poll

The 1986 Chico State Wildcats football team represented California State University, Chico as a member of the Northern California Athletic Conference (NCAC) during the 1986 NCAA Division II football season. Led by third-year head coach Mike Bellotti, Chico State compiled an overall record of 7–3 with a mark of 4–1 in conference play, placing second in the NCAC. The team outscored its opponents 338 to 203 for the season. The Wildcats played home games at University Stadium in Chico, California.

== Schedule ==
Date	Opponent	Site	Result	Attendance	Source
September 6	at Idaho State*	ASISU Minidome; Pocatello, ID	L 17–43	7,833	
September 13	at Cal Poly*	Mustang Stadium; San Luis Obispo, CA	L 18–26	4,330	
September 20	No. 10 Santa Clara*	University Stadium; Chico, CA	W 35–8	3,500–4,000	
September 27	Saint Mary's*	University Stadium; Chico, CA	W 23–21	3,800	
October 4	Sacramento State*	University Stadium; Chico, CA	W 44–38	4,000–4,500	
October 11	at No. 3 UC Davis	Toomey Field; Davis, CA	L 30–33	9,578–9,600	
October 25	at Humboldt State	Redwood Bowl; Arcata, CA	W 42–0	3,000–3,700	
November 8	at San Francisco State	Cox Stadium; San Francisco, CA	W 48–0	300	
November 15	No. 19 Cal State Hayward	University Stadium; Chico, CA	W 47–21	1,200–3,000	
November 22	Sonoma State	University Stadium; Chico, CA	W 34–13	2,500–4,681	
*Non-conference game; Rankings from NCAA Division II Football Committee Poll released prior to the game
