= 1986 Sonoma State Cossacks football team =

American college football season

1986 Sonoma State Cossacks football
- Conference: Northern California Athletic Conference
- Record: 4–6 (2–3 NCAC)
- Head coach: Tony Kehl (5th season)
- Home stadium: Cossacks Stadium

1986 Northern California Athletic Conference football standings
	Conf.					Overall
Team	W		L		T	W		L		T
No. 2 UC Davis $^	5	–	0	–	0	10	–	1	–	0
Chico State	4	–	1	–	0	7	–	3	–	0
Cal State Hayward	3	–	2	–	0	7	–	3	–	0
Sonoma State	2	–	3	–	0	4	–	6	–	0
San Francisco State	1	–	4	–	0	2	–	9	–	0
Humboldt State	0	–	5	–	0	2	–	9	–	0
$ – Conference champion; ^ – NCAA Division II playoff participant; Rankings from NCAA Division II Football Committee poll

The 1986 Sonoma State Cossacks football team represented Sonoma State University as a member of the Northern California Athletic Conference (NCAC) during the 1986 NCAA Division II football season. Led by Tony Kehl in his fifth and final season as head coach, Sonoma State compiled an overall record of 4–6 with a mark of 2–3 in conference play, placing fourth in the NCAC. The team was outscored by its opponents 235 to 199 for the season. The Cossacks played home games at Cossacks Stadium (Note: Cossacks Stadium was renamed in 2002 to Seawolf Stadium when the University changed the name of the mascot to Seawolves.) in Rohnert Park, California.

Kehl finished his tenure at Sonoma State with an overall record of 13–39, for a .250 winning percentage.

== Schedule ==
Date	Opponent	Site	Result	Attendance	Source
September 13	Cal State Northridge*	Cossacks Stadium; Rohnert Park, CA	L 17–35	2,140	
September 20	at Cal Lutheran*	Mt. Clef Field; Thousand Oaks, CA	L 21–37	1,935	
October 4	at Saint Mary's*	Saint Mary's Stadium; Moraga, CA	L 23–24	3,445	
October 11	San Francisco State	Cossacks Stadium; Rohnert Park, CA	W 16–10	2,014	
October 18	Cal State Hayward	Cossacks Stadium; Rohnert Park, CA	L 10–37	800–862	
October 25	at Menlo*	Atherton, CA	W 22–0	364	
November 1	at No. 3 UC Davis	Toomey Field; Davis, CA	L 6–12	6,650	
November 8	Humboldt State	Cossacks Stadium; Rohnert Park, CA	W 24–17	1,491	
November 15	at UC Santa Barbara*	Harder Stadium; Santa Barbara, CA	W 47–29	8,815	
November 22	at Chico State	University Stadium; Chico, CA	L 13–34	2,500–4,681	
*Non-conference game; Rankings from NCAA Division II Football Committee Poll released prior to the game
