= 1986 Central State Marauders football team =

American college football season

1986 Central State Marauders football

Black college national champion

NCAA Division II Semifinal, L 12–35 vs. North Dakota State
- Conference: Independent
- Record: 10–1–1
- Head coach: Billy Joe (6th season)
- Home stadium: McPherson Stadium

1986 NCAA Division II independents football records
	Conf.			Overall
Team	W	L	T	W		L		T
No. 4 Central State (OH) ^		–		10	–	1	–	1
No. T–18 New Haven		–		8	–	2	–	0
No. 7 Towson State ^		–		8	–	3	–	1
Southern Connecticut State		–		7	–	3	–	0
American International		–		6	–	4	–	0
UCF		–		6	–	5	–	0
Northern Michigan		–		5	–	5	–	0
Saint Mary's		–		5	–	5	–	0
Springfield		–		4	–	5	–	0
Michigan Tech		–		3	–	6	–	0
Kentucky State		–		1	–	9	–	0
Liberty		–		1	–	9	–	0
Central Connecticut		–		0	–	10	–	0
^ – NCAA Division II playoff participant; Rankings from NCAA Division II Football Committee poll

The 1986 Central State Marauders football team represented Central State University as an independent during the 1986 NCAA Division II football season. Led by sixth-year head coach Billy Joe, the Marauders compiled an overall record of 10–1–1. At the conclusion of the season, the Marauders were also recognized as black college national champion.

== Schedule ==
Date	Opponent	Rank	Site	Result	Attendance	Source
September 6	at Saginaw Valley State		Wickes Stadium; Saginaw, MI	W 41–39	2,800	
September 20	Winston-Salem State	No. 6	McPherson Stadium; Wilberforce, OH	W 35–8	6,200	
September 27	Ferris State	No. 6	McPherson Stadium; Wilberforce, OH	W 45–31	2,500	
October 4	at Lincoln (MO)	No. T–5	Reed Stadium; Jefferson City, MO	W 65–6	300	
October 11	vs. Florida A&M	No. 5	Hoosier Dome; Indianapolis, IN (Circle City Classic)	W 41–3	41,002	
October 18	Kentucky State	No. 5	McPherson Stadium; Wilberforce, OH	W 63–7	8,500	
October 25	at Hillsdale	No. 5	Frank "Muddy" Waters Stadium; Hillsdale, MI	W 28–8	1,500	
November 1	Wayne State (MI)	No. 4	McPherson Stadium; Wilberforce, OH	W 28–7	3,500	
November 8	at Alabama A&M	No. 3	Milton Frank Stadium; Huntsville, AL	T 10–10	2,000	
November 15	Northwest Missouri State	No. 4	McPherson Stadium; Wilberforce, OH	W 36–0	1,500	
November 28	at No. 7 Towson State	No. 4	McPherson Stadium; Wilberforce, OH (NCAA Division II First Round)	W 31–0	2,500	
December 6	at No. 1 North Dakota State	No. 4	Dacotah Field; Fargo, ND (NCAA Division II Semifinal)	L 12–35	12,380	
Rankings from AP Poll released prior to the game
