= 1986 North Dakota State Bison football team =

American college football season

1986 North Dakota State Bison football

NCAA Division II champion NCC champion

NCAA Division II Championship Game, W 27–7 vs. South Dakota
- Conference: North Central Conference
- Record: 13–0 (9–0 NCC)
- Head coach: Earle Solomonson (2nd season)
- Home stadium: Dacotah Field

1986 North Central Conference football standings
	Conf.					Overall
Team	W		L		T	W		L		T
No. 1 North Dakota State $^	9	–	0	–	0	13	–	0	–	0
No. 6 South Dakota ^	8	–	1	–	0	11	–	3	–	0
Mankato State	6	–	3	–	0	6	–	4	–	1
South Dakota State	5	–	4	–	0	6	–	5	–	0
Nebraska–Omaha	4	–	5	–	0	5	–	6	–	0
St. Cloud State	4	–	5	–	0	4	–	7	–	0
Augustana (SD)	3	–	6	–	0	5	–	6	–	0
Northern Colorado	3	–	6	–	0	3	–	8	–	0
North Dakota	2	–	7	–	0	2	–	9	–	0
Morningside	1	–	8	–	0	1	–	10	–	0
$ – Conference champion; ^ – NCAA Division II playoff participant; Rankings from NCAA Division II Football Committee poll

The 1986 North Dakota State football team represented North Dakota State University during the 1986 NCAA Division II football season, and completed the 90th season of Bison football. The Bison played their home games at Dacotah Field in Fargo, North Dakota. The 1986 team came off an 11–2–1 record from the previous season. The 1986 team was led by coach Earle Solomonson. The team finished the regular season with an undefeated 10–0 record and made the NCAA Division II playoffs. The Bison defeated theSouth Dakota, 27–7, in the National Championship Game en route to the program's second consecutive, and third NCAA Division II Football Championship.

Senior quarterback Jeff Bentrim was awarded the inaugural Harlon Hill Trophy, which honors the best football player in Division II, at the end of the season. Bentrim ended the season with 64 career touchdowns scored, breaking Walter Payton's Division II record of 63.

== Schedule ==
Date	Opponent	Site	Result	Attendance	Source
September 6	Northern Michigan*	Dacotah Field; Fargo, ND	W 52–7	15,800	
September 20	at Mankato State	Blakeslee Stadium; Mankato, MN	W 48–7	4,677	
September 27	South Dakota	Dacotah Field; Fargo, ND	W 21–12	16,200	
October 4	at Northern Colorado	Jackson Field; Greeley, CO	W 33–12	2,510	
October 11	at South Dakota State	Coughlin–Alumni Stadium; Brookings, SD (rivalry)	W 49–7	10,734	
October 18	St. Cloud State^{†}	Dacotah Field; Fargo, ND	W 49–7	16,000	
October 25	at Morningside	Elwood Olsen Stadium; Sioux City, IA	W 63–0	520	
November 1	Nebraska–Omaha	Dacotah Field; Fargo, ND	W 25–3	10,500	
November 8	Augustana (SD)	Dacotah Field; Fargo, ND	W 25–0	2,800	
November 15	at North Dakota	Memorial Stadium; Grand Forks, ND (Nickel Trophy)	W 62–13	6,000	
November 29	No. 12 Ashland*	Dacotah Field; Fargo, ND (NCAA Division II Quarterfinal)	W 50–0	12,090	
December 6	No. 4 Central State (OH)*	Dacotah Field; Fargo, ND (NCAA Division II Semifinal)	W 35–12	12,380	
December 13	vs. No. 6 South Dakota	Braly Municipal Stadium; Florence, AL (NCAA Division II Championship Game)	W 27–7	11,506	
*Non-conference game; ^{†}Homecoming; Rankings from Coaches' Poll released prior to the game
