= 1986 UCF Knights football team =

American college football season

1986 UCF Knights football
- Conference: Independent
- Record: 6–5
- Head coach: Gene McDowell (2nd season)
- Offensive coordinator: Mike Kruczek (2nd season)
- Defensive coordinator: Bruce Bennett (1st season)
- Home stadium: Florida Citrus Bowl

1986 NCAA Division II independents football records
	Conf.			Overall
Team	W	L	T	W		L		T
No. 4 Central State (OH) ^		–		10	–	1	–	1
No. T–18 New Haven		–		8	–	2	–	0
No. 7 Towson State ^		–		8	–	3	–	1
Southern Connecticut State		–		7	–	3	–	0
American International		–		6	–	4	–	0
UCF		–		6	–	5	–	0
Northern Michigan		–		5	–	5	–	0
Saint Mary's		–		5	–	5	–	0
Springfield		–		4	–	5	–	0
Michigan Tech		–		3	–	6	–	0
Kentucky State		–		1	–	9	–	0
Liberty		–		1	–	9	–	0
Central Connecticut		–		0	–	10	–	0
^ – NCAA Division II playoff participant; Rankings from NCAA Division II Football Committee poll

The 1986 UCF Knights football season was the eighth season for the team. It was Gene McDowell's second season as the head coach of the Knights. McDowell's 1986 team compiled a 6–5 overall record.

The Knights competed as an NCAA Division II Independent. The team played their home games at the Citrus Bowl in Downtown Orlando. The Knights nearly earned their first-ever victory against a Division I-A team. On October 11, they fell 9-6 at Wichita State, on a miserable, soggy, afternoon after missing an extra point and two botched field goal attempts. It proved to be the Shockers' final football victory; less than two months after the game, Wichita State announced it was disbanding its program.

== Schedule ==
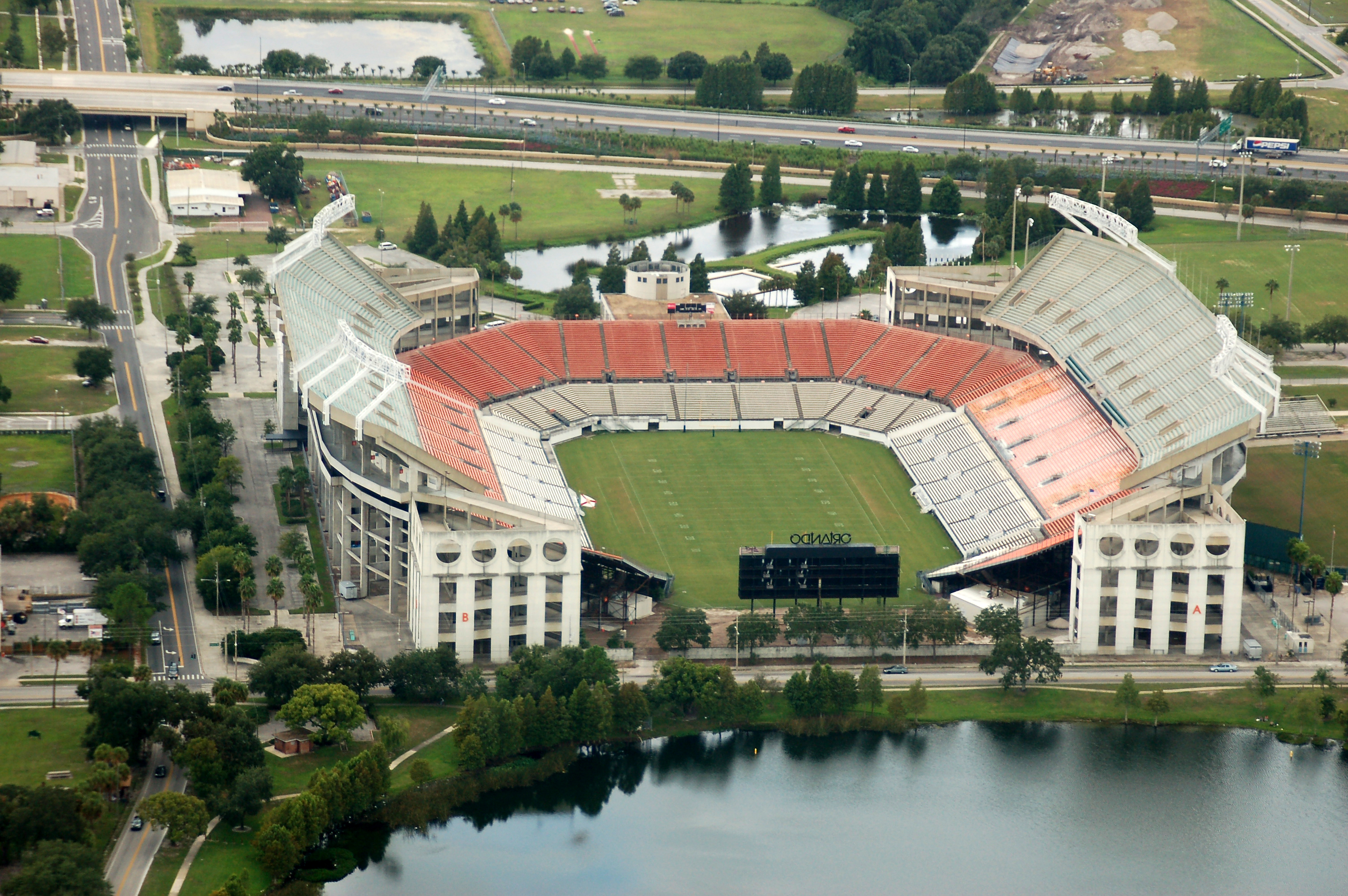
The Florida Citrus Bowl, the Knights' home field

Date	Opponent	Rank	Site	Result	Attendance	Source
September 6	Bethune–Cookman		Florida Citrus Bowl; Orlando, FL	W 26–14	23,041	
September 13	West Georgia		Florida Citrus Bowl; Orlando, FL	W 34–21	10,125	
September 20	No. 20 Valdosta State	No. 18	Florida Citrus Bowl; Orlando, FL	W 10–7	12,056	
September 27	at Akron		Rubber Bowl; Akron, OH	L 17–20	12,186	
October 4	Murray State		Florida Citrus Bowl; Orlando, FL	W 38–25	13,086	
October 11	at Wichita State		Cessna Stadium; Wichita, KS	L 6–9	4,167	
October 18	at Eastern Kentucky	No. 19	Roy Kidd Stadium; Richmond, KY	L 24–51	12,200	
October 25	Wofford		Florida Citrus Bowl; Orlando, FL	L 28–31	23,760	
November 1	at VMI		Alumni Memorial Field; Lexington, VA	W 38–9	3,200	
November 8	No. 5 (I-AA) Georgia Southern		Florida Citrus Bowl; Orlando, FL	L 23–33	11,137	
November 15	Samford		Florida Citrus Bowl; Orlando, FL	W 66–7	6,176	
Rankings from NCAA Division II Football Committee Poll released prior to the game
