= 1985 Liberty Flames football team =

American college football season

1985 Liberty Flames football
- Conference: Independent
- Record: 3–4–1
- Head coach: Morgan Hout (2nd season)
- Home stadium: City Stadium

1985 NCAA Division II independents football records
	Conf.			Overall
Team	W	L	T	W		L		T
No. 14 American International		–		8	–	2	–	0
No. 10 Towson State		–		7	–	2	–	1
No. 5 Central State (OH) ^		–		8	–	3	–	0
Northern Michigan		–		6	–	3	–	0
New Haven		–		6	–	4	–	0
Southern Connecticut State		–		4	–	5	–	0
Liberty		–		3	–	4	–	1
UCF		–		4	–	7	–	0
Central Connecticut		–		3	–	7	–	0
Saint Mary's		–		3	–	8	–	0
Springfield		–		2	–	8	–	0
Kentucky State		–		0	–	11	–	0
^ – NCAA Division II playoff participant; Rankings from NCAA Division II Football Committee poll

The 1985 Liberty Flames football team represented Liberty University as an independent during the 1985 NCAA Division II football season. Led by second-year head coach Morgan Hout, the Flames compiled an overall record of 3–4–1.

The Flames' final two games of the season were canceled after their equipment was destroyed when their practice facility flooded during the 1985 Election Day floods.

== Schedule ==
Date	Opponent	Site	Result	Attendance	Source
September 7	West Georgia	City Stadium; Lynchburg, VA	L 7–10	7,321	
September 14	Mars Hill	City Stadium; Lynchburg, VA	W 23–7	6,590	
September 21	at James Madison	JMU Stadium; Harrisonburg, VA	W 9–3	11,000	
September 28	at Wofford	Synder Field; Spartanburg, SC	W 15–9	5,333	
October 5	at East Tennessee State	Memorial Center; Johnson City, TN	T 23–23	6,375	
October 19	Southern Connecticut State	City Stadium; Lynchburg, VA	L 28–30	10,652	
October 26	at Lenoir–Rhyne	Moretz Stadium; Hickory, NC	L 16–18	7,150	
November 2	Presbyterian	City Stadium; Lynchburg, VA	L 0–3	1,683	
November 9	at Carson–Newman	Burke–Tarr Stadium; Jefferson City, TN	Canceled		
November 16	at Towson State	Minnegan Stadium; Towson, MD	Canceled		
