= Grand Valley State Lakers football, 1980–1989 =

American college football season

1980–1989 Grand Valley State Lakers football
- Conference: Great Lakes Intercollegiate Athletic Conference (1980–1989)
- Head coach: Jim Harkema (1973–1982); Bob Giesey (1983–1984); Tom Beck (1985–1990)
- Home stadium: Lubbers Stadium

The Grand Valley State Lakers football program, 1980–1989 represented Grand Valley State University (GVSU), known as Grand Valley State College prior to 1988, during the 1980s in NCAA Division II college football as a member of the Great Lakes Intercollegiate Athletic Conference (GLIAC). The team was led by head coaches Jim Harkema (1973–1982), Bob Giesey (1983–1984), and Tom Beck (1985–1990).

The team played its home games at Lubbers Stadium, named after former university president Arend Lubbers, located on GVSU's main campus in Allendale, Michigan.

== 1980 ==
1980 Grand Valley State Lakers football
- Conference: Great Lakes Intercollegiate Athletic Conference
- Record: 7–3 (4–2 GLIAC)
- Head coach: Jim Harkema (8th season)
- Home stadium: Lubbers Stadium

1980 Great Lakes Intercollegiate Athletic Conference football standings
	Conf.					Overall
Team	W		L		T	W		L		T
No. 20 Hillsdale $	5	–	1	–	0	7	–	4	–	0
Northwood	4	–	2	–	0	6	–	2	–	1
No. 18 Grand Valley State	4	–	2	–	0	7	–	3	–	0
Wayne State (MI)	3	–	3	–	0	5	–	4	–	0
Ferris State	2	–	3	–	1	4	–	4	–	2
Saginaw Valley State	2	–	4	–	0	5	–	6	–	0
Michigan Tech	0	–	5	–	1	2	–	6	–	1
$ – Conference champion; Rankings from NAIA Division I poll

The 1980 Grand Valley State Lakers football team represented Grand Valley State University (GVSU) as a member of the Great Lakes Intercollegiate Athletic Conference (GLIAC) during the 1980 NCAA Division II football season. In their eighth year under head coach Jim Harkema, the Lakers compiled a 7–3 record (4–2 in conference games), finished in second place in the GLIAC, and outscored opponents by a total of 290 to 166.

=== Schedule ===
Date	Opponent	Site	Result	Attendance	Source
September 6	at Hope*	Holland, MI	W 14–7	6,308	
September 13	at Northern Michigan*	Marquette, MI	L 9–48	5,767	
September 20	Northeastern Illinois*	Lubbers Stadium; Allendale, MI	W 76–0	2,651	
September 27	at Michigan Tech	Houghton, MI	W 44–6	2,800	
October 4	Wayne State (MI)	Lubbers Stadium; Allendale, MI	L 7–10	3,846	
October 11	Saginaw Valley State	Lubbers Stadium; Allendale, MI	W 45–22	2,357	
October 18	Northwestern (IA)*	Lubbers Stadium; Allendale, MI	W 34–26	2,391	
October 25	at Hillsdale	Hillsdale, MI	L 9–27	2,196	
November 1	Northwood	Lubbers Stadium; Allendale, MI	W 17–13	2,263	
November 8	at Ferris State	Big Rapids, MI	W 35–7	4,200	
*Non-conference game

== 1981 ==
1981 Grand Valley State Lakers football
- Conference: Great Lakes Intercollegiate Athletic Conference
- Record: 7–2 (6–0 GLIAC)
- Head coach: Jim Harkema (9th season)
- Home stadium: Lubbers Stadium

1981 Great Lakes Intercollegiate Athletic Conference football standings
	Conf.					Overall
Team	W		L		T	W		L		T
Grand Valley State $	6	–	0	–	0	7	–	2	–	0
No. 3 Hillsdale ^	5	–	1	–	0	10	–	2	–	0
Ferris State	3	–	3	–	0	4	–	4	–	0
Wayne State (MI)	3	–	3	–	0	4	–	5	–	0
Northwood	2	–	4	–	0	4	–	6	–	0
Saginaw Valley State	2	–	4	–	0	3	–	7	–	0
Michigan Tech	0	–	6	–	0	1	–	8	–	0
$ – Conference champion; ^ – NAIA Division I playoff participant; Rankings from NAIA Division I poll

The 1981 Grand Valley State Lakers football team represented Grand Valley State University (GVSU) as a member of the Great Lakes Intercollegiate Athletic Conference (GLIAC) during the 1980 NCAA Division II football season. In their ninth year under head coach Jim Harkema, the Lakers compiled a 7–2 record (6–0 in conference games), won the GLIAC championship, and outscored opponents by a total of 309 to 131.

=== Schedule ===
Date	Opponent	Site	Result	Attendance	Source
September 12	at Northern Iowa*	UNI-Dome; Cedar Falls, IA	L 20–21	12,083	
September 26	No. 2 Northern Michigan*	Lubbers Stadium; Allendale, MI	L 28–29	1,500	
October 3	Michigan Tech	Lubbers Stadium; Allendale, MI	W 52–6	2,832	
October 10	at Wayne State (MI)	Detroit, MI	W 40–17	3,007	
October 17	at Saginaw Valley State	University Center, MI	W 31–7	1,500	
October 24	Central State (OH)*	Lubbers Stadium; Allendale, MI	W 31–20	1,060	
October 31	Hillsdale	Lubbers Stadium; Allendale, MI	W 23–12	2,624	
November 7	at Northwood	Midland, MI	W 38–7	1,900	
November 14	Ferris State	Lubbers Stadium; Allendale, MI	W 46–12	3,200	
*Non-conference game; Rankings from NCAA Division II Football Committee Poll released prior to the game

== 1982 ==
1982 Grand Valley State Lakers football
- Conference: Great Lakes Intercollegiate Athletic Conference
- Record: 7–3 (5–1 GLIAC)
- Head coach: Jim Harkema (10th season)
- Home stadium: Lubbers Stadium

1982 Great Lakes Intercollegiate Athletic Conference football standings
	Conf.					Overall
Team	W		L		T	W		L		T
No. 1 Hillsdale $^	6	–	0	–	0	12	–	1	–	0
Grand Valley State	5	–	1	–	0	7	–	3	–	0
Northwood	4	–	2	–	0	6	–	4	–	0
Wayne State (MI)	2	–	4	–	0	3	–	7	–	0
Ferris State	2	–	4	–	0	2	–	6	–	0
Michigan Tech	1	–	5	–	0	1	–	8	–	0
Saginaw Valley State	1	–	5	–	0	1	–	9	–	0
$ – Conference champion; ^ – NAIA Division I playoff participant; Rankings from NAIA Division I poll

The 1982 Grand Valley State Lakers football team represented Grand Valley State University (GVSU) as a member of the Great Lakes Intercollegiate Athletic Conference (GLIAC) during the 1982 NCAA Division II football season. In their tenth and final year under head coach Jim Harkema, the Lakers compiled a 7–3 record (5–1 in conference games), finished in second place in the GLIAC, and outscored opponents by a total of 310 to 213.

Harkema left GVSU after the 1982 season to become head coach at Eastern Michigan. In ten years at GVSU, he had compiled a 68-29-1 record with three GLIAC championships.

=== Schedule ===
Date	Opponent	Site	Result	Attendance	Source
September 4	at Western Michigan*	Waldo Stadium; Kalamazoo, MI	L 3–28	15,881–15,991	
September 18	St. Cloud State*	Lubbers Stadium; Allendale, MI	W 44–7	1,619	
September 25	Central State (OH)*	Lubbers Stadium; Allendale, MI	W 35–12	2,728	
October 2	Wayne State (MI)	Lubbers Stadium; Allendale, MI	W 32–14	3,294	
October 9	at Ferris State	Top Taggart Field; Big Rapids, MI	W 38–35	9,500	
October 16	at Northern Michigan*	Marquette, MI	L 29–47	4,097	
October 23	at Hillsdale	Hillsdale, MI	L 19–24	8,301	
October 30	at Michigan Tech	Sheman Field; Houghton, MI	W 35–28	589	
November 6	Northwood	Lubbers Stadium; Allendale, MI	W 20–10	2,231	
November 13	Saginaw Valley State	Lubbers Stadium; Allendale, MI	W 55–7	1,356	
*Non-conference game

== 1983 ==
1983 Grand Valley State Lakers football
- Conference: Great Lakes Intercollegiate Athletic Conference
- Record: 4–6 (3–3 GLIAC)
- Head coach: Bob Giesey (1st season)
- Home stadium: Lubbers Stadium

1983 Great Lakes Intercollegiate Athletic Conference football standings
	Conf.					Overall
Team	W		L		T	W		L		T
No. 7 Saginaw Valley State $^	6	–	0	–	0	9	–	3	–	0
No. 8 Hillsdale	4	–	2	–	0	8	–	2	–	0
Wayne State (MI)	4	–	2	–	0	7	–	3	–	0
Northwood	3	–	3	–	0	4	–	4	–	0
Grand Valley State	3	–	3	–	0	4	–	6	–	0
Michigan Tech	1	–	5	–	0	3	–	7	–	0
Ferris State	0	–	6	–	0	0	–	9	–	0
$ – Conference champion; ^ – NAIA Division I playoff participant; Rankings from NAIA Division I poll

The 1983 Grand Valley State Lakers football team represented Grand Valley State University (GVSU) as a member of the Great Lakes Intercollegiate Athletic Conference (GLIAC) during the 1983 NCAA Division II football season. In their first year under head coach Bob Giesey, the Lakers compiled a 4–6 record (3–3 in conference games), tied for fourth place in the GLIAC, and were outscored by a total of 238 to 227.

=== Schedule ===
Date	Opponent	Site	Result	Attendance	Source
September 10	Saint Joseph's (IN)*	Lubbers Stadium; Allendale, MI	W 24–22	3,413	
September 17	at Eastern Illinois*	O'Brien Field; Charleston, IL	L 21–35	6,400	
September 24	at Central State (OH)*	McPherson Stadium; Wilberforce, OH	L 14–21	3,183–4,500	
October 1	at Wayne State (MI)	Detroit, MI	L 10–22	3,740	
October 8	Ferris State	Lubbers Stadium; Allendale, MI	W 52–21	4,327	
October 15	Northern Michigan*	Lubbers Stadium; Allendale, MI	L 14–27	3,648	
October 22	Hillsdale	Lubbers Stadium; Allendale, MI	W 12–10	3,129	
October 29	Michigan Tech	Lubbers Stadium; Allendale, MI	W 36–34	3,177	
November 5	at Northwood	Midland, MI	L 30–31	1,800	
November 12	at Saginaw Valley State	University Center, MI	L 14–15	2,800	
*Non-conference game

== 1984 ==
1984 Grand Valley State Lakers football
- Conference: Great Lakes Intercollegiate Athletic Conference
- Record: 0–10 (0–6 GLIAC)
- Head coach: Bob Giesey (2nd season)
- Home stadium: Lubbers Stadium

1984 Great Lakes Intercollegiate Athletic Conference football standings
	Conf.					Overall
Team	W		L		T	W		L		T
No. 6 Saginaw Valley State $^	6	–	0	–	0	8	–	3	–	0
No. 17 Northwood	5	–	1	–	0	6	–	3	–	0
Wayne State (MI)	4	–	2	–	0	6	–	5	–	0
Hillsdale	3	–	3	–	0	6	–	4	–	0
Michigan Tech	2	–	4	–	0	4	–	6	–	0
Ferris State	1	–	5	–	0	2	–	8	–	0
Grand Valley State	0	–	6	–	0	0	–	10	–	0
$ – Conference champion; ^ – NAIA Division I playoff participant; Rankings from NAIA Division I poll

The 1984 Grand Valley State Lakers football team represented Grand Valley State University (GVSU) as a member of the Great Lakes Intercollegiate Athletic Conference (GLIAC) during the 1984 NCAA Division II football season. In their second and final year under head coach Bob Giesey, the Lakers compiled a 0–10 record (0–6 in conference games), finished in last place in the GLIAC, and were outscored by a total of 301 to 99.

=== Schedule ===
Date	Time	Opponent	Site	Result	Attendance	Source
September 1		Eastern Illinois*	Lubbers Stadium; Allendale, MI	L 9–35	1,821	
September 8	7:30 p.m.	at Carson–Newman*	Morristown, TN	L 9–42	2,800–3,800	
September 15		Northwest Missouri State*	Lubbers Stadium; Allendale, MI	L 0–26	3,482	
September 22		at Northern Michigan*	Marquette, MI	L 13–59	5,324	
September 29		Saginaw Valley State	Lubbers Stadium; Allendale, MI	L 14–28	3,609	
October 6		at Hillsdale	Hillsdale, MI	L 6–20	6,000	
October 20		at Michigan Tech	Houghton, MI	L 20–27	599	
October 27		at Ferris State	Big Rapids, MI	L 11–13	1,610	
November 3		Northwood	Lubbers Stadium; Allendale, MI	L 14–21	1,529	
November 10		Wayne State (MI)	Lubbers Stadium; Allendale, MI	L 3–30	2,471	
*Non-conference game; All times are in Eastern time

== 1985 ==
1985 Grand Valley State Lakers football
- Conference: Great Lakes Intercollegiate Athletic Conference
- Record: 6–5 (4–2 GLIAC)
- Head coach: Tom Beck (1st season)
- Home stadium: Lubbers Stadium

1985 Great Lakes Intercollegiate Athletic Conference football standings
	Conf.					Overall
Team	W		L		T	W		L		T
No. 2 Hillsdale $^	5	–	1	–	0	11	–	1	–	1
Saginaw Valley State	4	–	1	–	1	4	–	5	–	1
Ferris State	4	–	2	–	0	6	–	4	–	0
Grand Valley State	4	–	2	–	0	6	–	5	–	0
Northwood	2	–	3	–	1	3	–	4	–	2
Wayne State (MI)	1	–	5	–	0	1	–	8	–	1
Michigan Tech	0	–	6	–	0	1	–	9	–	0
$ – Conference champion; ^ – NAIA Division I playoff participant; Rankings from NAIA Division I poll

The 1985 Grand Valley State Lakers football team represented Grand Valley State University (GVSU) as a member of the Great Lakes Intercollegiate Athletic Conference (GLIAC) during the 1985 NCAA Division II football season. In their first year under head coach Tom Beck, the Lakers compiled a 6–5 record (4–2 in conference games), tied for third place in the GLIAC, and were outscored by a total of 237 to 213.

=== Schedule ===
Date	Opponent	Site	Result	Attendance	Source
September 7	at Wisconsin–Stout*	Menomonie, WI	L 7–23	2,126	
September 14	Northern Michigan*	Lubbers Stadium; Allendale, MI	L 7–42	3,840	
September 21	at Evansville*	Evansville, IN	W 28–14	2,900	
September 28	Wayne State (MI)	Lubbers Stadium; Allendale, MI	W 10–7	3,832	
October 5	at Ferris State	Big Rapids, MI	W 27–21	8,700	
October 12	at Central Connecticut State*	New Britain, CT	W 21–14	1,839	
October 19	Hillsdale	Lubbers Stadium; Allendale, MI	L 14–21	3,550	
October 26	at Michigan Tech	Houghton, MI	W 42–22	470	
November 2	Northwood	Lubbers Stadium; Allendale, MI	W 24–21	2,181	
November 9	at Saginaw Valley State	University Center, MI	L 18–35	1,000	
November 16	Missouri–Rolla*	Lubbers Stadium; Allendale, MI	L 15–17	3,337	
*Non-conference game

== 1986 ==
1986 Grand Valley State Lakers football
- Conference: Great Lakes Intercollegiate Athletic Conference
- Record: 9–2 (4–1 GLIAC)
- Head coach: Tom Beck (2nd season)
- Home stadium: Lubbers Stadium

1986 Great Lakes Intercollegiate Athletic Conference football standings
	Conf.					Overall
Team	W		L		T	W		L		T
No. 3 Hillsdale $^	5	–	0	–	0	10	–	2	–	0
No. 17 Grand Valley State	4	–	1	–	0	9	–	2	–	0
Saginaw Valley State	3	–	2	–	0	5	–	4	–	0
Ferris State	2	–	3	–	0	5	–	5	–	0
Northwood	1	–	4	–	0	1	–	8	–	0
Wayne State (MI)	0	–	5	–	0	3	–	7	–	0
$ – Conference champion; ^ – NAIA Division I playoff participant; Rankings from NAIA Division I poll for Hillsdale and NCAA Division II Football Committee poll for Grand Valley State

The 1986 Grand Valley State Lakers football team represented Grand Valley State University (GVSU) as a member of the Great Lakes Intercollegiate Athletic Conference (GLIAC) during the 1986 NCAA Division II football season. In their second year under head coach Tom Beck, the Lakers compiled a 9–2 record (4–1 in conference games), finished in second place in the GLIAC, and outscored opponents by a total of 325 to 171.

=== Schedule ===
Date	Opponent	Rank	Site	Result	Attendance	Source
September 6	Wisconsin–Stout*		Lubbers Stadium; Allendale, MI	W 35–0	2,841	
September 13	at Butler*		Indianapolis, IN	W 30–28	7,477	
September 20	Evansville*	No. 7	Lubbers Stadium; Allendale, MI	W 49–7	2,537	
September 27	at Wayne State (MI)	No. T–7	Detroit, MI	W 21–3	1,230	
October 4	Ferris State	No. 8	Lubbers Stadium; Allendale, MI	W 30–22	3,433	
October 11	Central Connecticut State*	No. 8	Lubbers Stadium; Allendale, MI	W 21–11	3,113	
October 18	at Hillsdale	No. 8	Hillsdale, MI	L 22–25	7,000	
October 25	at Northern Michigan*	No. 11	Marquette, MI	L 24–28	2,430	
November 1	at Northwood		Midland, MI	W 35–14	600	
November 8	Saginaw Valley State		Lubbers Stadium; Allendale, MI	W 28–13	2,839	
November 15	at Missouri–Rolla*	No. 20	Rolla, MO	W 30–20	800	
*Non-conference game; Rankings from NCAA Division II Football Committee Poll released prior to the game

== 1987 ==
1987 Grand Valley State Lakers football
- Conference: Great Lakes Intercollegiate Athletic Conference
- Record: 7–4 (4–1 GLIAC)
- Head coach: Tom Beck (3rd season)
- Home stadium: Lubbers Stadium

1987 Great Lakes Intercollegiate Athletic Conference football standings
	Conf.					Overall
Team	W		L		T	W		L		T
No. 5 Northern Michigan $^	4	–	0	–	0	10	–	2	–	0
Grand Valley State	4	–	1	–	0	7	–	4	–	0
Hillsdale	2	–	3	–	0	6	–	5	–	0
Saginaw Valley State	2	–	3	–	0	5	–	5	–	0
Ferris State	2	–	3	–	0	4	–	7	–	0
Wayne State (MI)	0	–	4	–	0	4	–	6	–	0
$ – Conference champion; ^ – NCAA Division II playoff participant; Rankings from NCAA Division II Football Committee poll

The 1987 Grand Valley State Lakers football team represented Grand Valley State University (GVSU) as a member of the Great Lakes Intercollegiate Athletic Conference (GLIAC) during the 1987 NCAA Division II football season. In their third year under head coach Tom Beck, the Lakers compiled a 7–4 record (4–1 in conference games), finished in second place in the GLIAC, and outscored opponents by a total of 276 to 234.

=== Schedule ===
Date	Opponent	Rank	Site	Result	Attendance	Source
September 5	at Northeast Missouri State*	No. 8	Kirksville, MO	L 23–30	3,800	
September 12	Butler*		Lubbers Stadium; Allendale, MI	W 24–19	3,342	
September 19	Winona State*	No. 17	Lubbers Stadium; Allendale, MI	W 50–16	2,959	
September 26	at Central State (OH)*	No. 14	McPherson Stadium; Wilberforce, OH	L 23–25	4,500	
October 3	Wayne State (MI)		Lubbers Stadium; Allendale, MI	W 28–0	3,927	
October 10	at Ferris State		Big Rapids, MI	W 21–5	5,700	
October 17	No. 2 Northern Michigan	No. 18	Lubbers Stadium; Allendale, MI	L 0–28	2,743	
October 24	Hillsdale		Lubbers Stadium; Allendale, MI	W 28–13	2,937	
October 31	at No. 11 UCF*		Florida Citrus Bowl; Orlando, FL	L 3–67	7,552	
November 7	Northwood*		Lubbers Stadium; Allendale, MI	W 45–3	2,627	
November 14	at Saginaw Valley State		University Center, MI	W 31–28	2,100	
*Non-conference game; Rankings from NCAA Division II Football Committee Poll released prior to the game

== 1988 ==
1988 Grand Valley State Lakers football
- Conference: Great Lakes Intercollegiate Athletic Conference
- Record: 7–4 (3–2 GLIAC)
- Head coach: Tom Beck (4th season)
- Home stadium: Lubbers Stadium

1988 Great Lakes Intercollegiate Athletic Conference football standings
	Conf.					Overall
Team	W		L		T	W		L		T
No. 5 Hillsdale $^	5	–	0	–	0	10	–	2	–	0
No. 19 Northern Michigan	4	–	1	–	0	8	–	3	–	0
Grand Valley State	3	–	2	–	0	7	–	4	–	0
No. 25 Saginaw Valley State	2	–	3	–	0	4	–	5	–	0
Ferris State	1	–	4	–	0	4	–	7	–	0
Wayne State (MI)	0	–	5	–	0	2	–	8	–	0
$ – Conference champion; ^ – NAIA Division I playoff participant; Rankings from NCAA Division II Football Committee poll for Northern Michigan and NAIA Division I poll for Hillsdale and Saginaw Valley State

The 1988 Grand Valley State Lakers football team represented Grand Valley State University (GVSU) as a member of the Great Lakes Intercollegiate Athletic Conference (GLIAC) during the 1988 NCAA Division II football season. In their fourth year under head coach Tom Beck, the Lakers compiled a 7–4 record (3–2 in conference games), finished in third place in the GLIAC, and outscored opponents by a total of 276 to 234.

=== Schedule ===
Date	Opponent	Site	Result	Attendance	Source
September 3	Northeast Missouri State*	Lubbers Stadium; Allendale, MI	L 35–36	2,448	
September 10	at No. 12 Western Illinois*	Macomb, IL	L 0–55	11,123	
September 17	at Winona State*	Winona, MN	W 45–26	2,100	
September 24	St. Francis (IL)*	Lubbers Stadium; Allendale, MI	W 35–21	4,165	
October 1	at Wayne State (MI)	Detroit, MI	W 13–10	1,307	
October 8	Ferris State	Lubbers Stadium; Allendale, MI	W 36–20	4,569	
October 15	at Northern Michigan	Marquette, MI	L 20–30	2,508	
October 22	at Hillsdale	Hillsdale, MI	L 0–20	2,200	
October 29	Southeast Missouri State*	Lubbers Stadium; Allendale, MI	W 46–24	2,481	
November 5	at Northwood*	Midland, MI	W 34–2	280	
November 12	Saginaw Valley State	Lubbers Stadium; Allendale, MI	W 14–13	1,806	
*Non-conference game; Rankings from NCAA Division I-AA Football Committee Poll released prior to the game

== 1989 ==
1989 Grand Valley State Lakers football

GLIAC champion

NCAA Division II first round, L 24–34 vs. IUP
- Conference: Great Lakes Intercollegiate Athletic Conference
- Record: 11–1 (5–0 GLIAC)
- Head coach: Tom Beck (5th season)
- Defensive coordinator: Brian Kelly (1st season)
- Home stadium: Lubbers Stadium

1989 Great Lakes Intercollegiate Athletic Conference football standings
	Conf.					Overall
Team	W		L		T	W		L		T
No. 3 Grand Valley State $^	5	–	0	–	0	11	–	1	–	0
Hillsdale	3	–	2	–	0	6	–	4	–	0
Northern Michigan	3	–	2	–	0	5	–	5	–	0
Ferris State	2	–	3	–	0	6	–	5	–	0
Saginaw Valley State	2	–	3	–	0	3	–	6	–	0
Wayne State (MI)	0	–	5	–	0	2	–	8	–	0
$ – Conference champion; ^ – NCAA Division II playoff participant; Rankings from NCAA Division II Football Committee poll

The 1989 Grand Valley State Lakers football team represented Grand Valley State University (GVSU) as a member of the Great Lakes Intercollegiate Athletic Conference (GLIAC) during the 1989 NCAA Division II football season. In their fifth year under head coach Tom Beck, the Lakers compiled an 11–1 record (5–0 in conference games), won the GLIAC championship, and outscored opponents by a total of 514 to 182. The team lost to IUP in the first round of the NCAA Division II playoffs. On October 28, the Lakers defeated Valparaiso, 91–0, the worst defeat in Valparaiso football history.

=== Schedule ===
Date	Opponent	Rank	Site	Result	Attendance	Source
September 2	at California (PA)*	No. 16	California, PA	W 41–7	4,887	
September 9	Mankato State*	No. 16	Lubbers Stadium; Allendale, MI	W 45–16	2,706	
September 16	at Butler*	No. 10	Indianapolis, IN	W 27–18	1,245	
September 23	at St. Francis (IL)*	No. 7	Joliet, IL	W 56–32	2,500	
September 30	Wayne State (MI)	No. 5	Lubbers Stadium; Allendale, MI	W 49–10	4,048–4,848	
October 7	at Ferris State	No. 5	Big Rapids, MI	W 28–0	7,800	
October 14	Northern Michigan	No. 4	Lubbers Stadium; Allendale, MI	W 38–14	2,956	
October 21	Hillsdale^{†}	No. 4	Lubbers Stadium; Allendale, MI	W 31–17	4,138	
October 28	Valparaiso*	No. 3	Lubbers Stadium; Allendale, MI	W 91–0	2,483	
November 4	Northwood*	No. 3	Lubbers Stadium; Allendale, MI	W 42–17	2,048	
November 11	at Saginaw Valley State	No. 3	Cardinal Stadium; University Center, MI	W 42–17	2,000	
November 18	No. 9 IUP*	No. 3	Lubbers Stadium; Allendale, MI (NCAA Division II first round)	L 24–34	1,837	
*Non-conference game; ^{†}Homecoming; Rankings from NCAA Division II Football Committee Poll released prior to the game
