= 1986 UC Davis Aggies football team =

American college football season

1986 UC Davis Aggies football

NCAC champion

NCAA Division II Quarterfinal, L 23–26 vs. South Dakota
- Conference: Northern California Athletic Conference
- Record: 10–1 (5–0 NCAC)
- Head coach: Jim Sochor (17th season)
- Home stadium: Toomey Field

1986 Northern California Athletic Conference football standings
	Conf.					Overall
Team	W		L		T	W		L		T
No. 2 UC Davis $^	5	–	0	–	0	10	–	1	–	0
Chico State	4	–	1	–	0	7	–	3	–	0
Cal State Hayward	3	–	2	–	0	7	–	3	–	0
Sonoma State	2	–	3	–	0	4	–	6	–	0
San Francisco State	1	–	4	–	0	2	–	9	–	0
Humboldt State	0	–	5	–	0	2	–	9	–	0
$ – Conference champion; ^ – NCAA Division II playoff participant; Rankings from NCAA Division II Football Committee poll

The 1986 UC Davis football team represented the University of California, Davis as a member of the Northern California Athletic Conference (NCAC) during the 1986 NCAA Division II football season. Led by 17th-year head coach Jim Sochor, UC Davis compiled an overall record of 10–1 with a mark of 5–0 in conference play, winning the NCAC for the 16th title consecutive season. 1986 was the team's 17th consecutive winning season. With the 5–0 conference record, the team stretched their conference winning streak to 31 games dating back to the 1981 season. The Aggies were ranked no lower than No. 4 in the NCAA Division II polls during the season. They advanced to the NCAA Division II Football Championship playoffs for the fifth straight year, where they lost to South Dakota in the quarterfinals. The team outscored its opponents 361 to 213 for the season. The Aggies played home games at Toomey Field in Davis, California.

== Schedule ==
Date	Time	Opponent	Rank	Site	Result	Attendance	Source
September 20		Cal Poly*	No. 4	Toomey Field; Davis, CA (rivalry)	W 32–21	8,700–8,770	
September 27		at Santa Clara	No. 4	Buck Shaw Stadium; Santa Clara, CA	W 42–18	8,137	
October 4		at Pacific (CA)*	No. 4	Pacific Memorial Stadium; Stockton, CA	W 45–41	15,000	
October 11		Chico State	No. 3	Toomey Field; Davis, CA	W 33–30	9,578–9,600	
October 18		at San Francisco State	No. 3	Cox Stadium; San Francisco, CA	W 51–3	3,000	
October 25		at No. 20 Cal State Hayward	No. 3	Pioneer Stadium; Hayward, CA	W 24–14	8,500	
November 1		Sonoma State	No. 3	Toomey Field; Davis, CA	W 12–6	6,650	
November 8		at No. T–8 Cal State Northridge*	No. 2	North Campus Stadium; Northridge, CA	W 25–20	6,244	
November 15		Sacramento State	No. 2	Toomey Field; Davis, CA (Causeway Classic)	W 29–6	10,300	
November 22		at Humboldt State	No. 2	Redwood Bowl; Arcata, CA	W 45–28	2,700–2,900	
November 29	12:30 p.m.	No. 6 South Dakota*	No. 2	Toomey Field; Davis, CA (NCAA Division II Quarterfinal)	L 23–26	9,000	
*Non-conference game; Rankings from NCAA Division II Football Committee Poll released prior to the game; All times are in Pacific time

== UC Davis players in the NFL ==
No UC Davis Aggies players were selected in the 1987 NFL draft. The following finished their college career in 1986, were not drafted, but played in the NFL.

Player	Position	First NFL team
Chris Mandeville	Defensive back	1987 Green Bay Packers
