= 1986 Santa Clara Broncos football team =

American college football season

1986 Santa Clara Broncos football
- Conference: Western Football Conference
- Record: 4–7 (2–4 WFC)
- Head coach: Terry Malley (2nd season)
- Home stadium: Buck Shaw Stadium

1986 Western Football Conference standings
	Conf.					Overall
Team	W		L		T	W		L		T
Sacramento State $	5	–	1	–	0	6	–	4	–	1
No. 9 Cal State Northridge	4	–	2	–	0	8	–	3	–	0
Portland State	4	–	2	–	0	6	–	5	–	0
Southern Utah State	3	–	3	–	0	8	–	3	–	0
Cal Poly	3	–	3	–	0	5	–	5	–	0
Santa Clara	2	–	4	–	0	4	–	7	–	0
Cal Lutheran	0	–	6	–	0	3	–	8	–	0
$ – Conference champion; Rankings from NCAA Division II Football Committee poll

The 1986 Santa Clara Broncos football team represented Santa Clara University as a member of the Western Football Conference (WFC) during the 1986 NCAA Division II football season. The Broncos were led by second-year head coach Terry Malley. They played home games at Buck Shaw Stadium in Santa Clara, California. Santa Clara finished the season with a record of four wins and seven losses (4–7, 2–4 WFC). The Broncos were outscored by their opponents 230–334 for the season.

== Schedule ==
Date	Opponent	Rank	Site	Result	Attendance	Source
September 13	Southern Utah State		Buck Shaw Stadium; Santa Clara, CA	W 31–18	4,719	
September 20	at Chico State*	No. 10	University Stadium; Chico, CA	L 8–35	3,500–4,000	
September 27	No. 4 UC Davis*		Buck Shaw Stadium; Santa Clara, CA	L 18–42	8,137	
October 4	at Cal State Hayward*		Pioneer Stadium; Hayward, CA	L 12–31	1,400–1,500	
October 11	at Sacramento State		Hornet Stadium; Sacramento, CA	L 7–38	5,500	
October 18	at Cal Lutheran		Mt. Clef Field; Thousand Oaks, CA	W 33–9	1,440	
October 25	San Francisco State*		Buck Shaw Stadium; Santa Clara, CA	W 27–24	6,277	
November 1	No. 10 Cal State Northridge		Buck Shaw Stadium; Santa Clara, CA	L 32–38	1,458	
November 8	at Portland State		Civic Stadium; Portland, OR	L 14–41	4,780	
November 15	at Saint Mary's*		Saint Mary's Stadium; Moraga, CA	W 24–22	5,451	
November 22	Cal Poly		Buck Shaw Stadium; Santa Clara, CA	L 24–36	2,834	
*Non-conference game; Rankings from NCAA Division II Football Committee Poll released prior to the game

== Team players in the NFL ==
No Santa Clara Broncos players were selected in the 1987 NFL draft.

The following finished their college career in 1986, were not drafted, but played in the NFL.

Player	Position	First NFL team
John Faylor	Defensive back	1987 San Francisco 49ers
