= 1986 Sacramento State Hornets football team =

American college football season

1986 Sacramento State Hornets football

WFC champion
- Conference: Western Football Conference
- Record: 6–4–1 (5–1 WFC)
- Head coach: Bob Mattos (9th season)
- Home stadium: Hornet Stadium

1986 Western Football Conference standings
	Conf.					Overall
Team	W		L		T	W		L		T
Sacramento State $	5	–	1	–	0	6	–	4	–	1
No. 9 Cal State Northridge	4	–	2	–	0	8	–	3	–	0
Portland State	4	–	2	–	0	6	–	5	–	0
Southern Utah State	3	–	3	–	0	8	–	3	–	0
Cal Poly	3	–	3	–	0	5	–	5	–	0
Santa Clara	2	–	4	–	0	4	–	7	–	0
Cal Lutheran	0	–	6	–	0	3	–	8	–	0
$ – Conference champion; Rankings from NCAA Division II Football Committee poll

The 1986 Sacramento State Hornets football team represented California State University, Sacramento as a member of the Western Football Conference (WFC) during the 1986 NCAA Division II football season. Led by ninth-year head coach Bob Mattos, Sacramento State compiled an overall record of 6–4–1 with a mark of 5–1 in conference play, winning the WFC title. The team outscored its opponents 308 to 268 for the season. The Hornets played home games at Hornet Stadium in Sacramento, California.

== Schedule ==
Date	Opponent	Rank	Site	Result	Attendance	Source
September 6	at Pacific (CA)*		Pacific Memorial Stadium; Stockton, CA	L 7–31	21,000	
September 13	at Mesa State*		Ralph Stocker Stadium; Grand Junction, CO	T 29–29	4,871	
September 27	at Humboldt State*		Redwood Bowl; Arcata, CA	W 45–17	3,700–4,900	
October 4	at Chico State*		University Stadium; Chico, CA	L 38–44	4,000–4,500	
October 11	Santa Clara		Hornet Stadium; Sacramento, CA	W 38–7	5,500	
October 18	Portland State		Hornet Stadium; Sacramento, CA	W 52–20	6,834	
October 25	at Southern Utah State		Eccles Coliseum; Cedar City, UT	W 48–31	3,490	
November 1	Cal Lutheran		Hornet Stadium; Sacramento, CA	W 18–17	3,500	
November 8	at Cal Poly	No. 19	Mustang Stadium; San Luis Obispo, CA	L 6–26	2,014	
November 15	at No. 2 UC Davis*		Toomey Field; Davis, CA (Causeway Classic)	L 6–29	10,300	
November 22	No. 9 Cal State Northridge		Hornet Stadium; Sacramento, CA	W 21–17	3,400	
*Non-conference game; Rankings from NCAA Division II Football Committee Poll released prior to the game

== Team players in the NFL ==
The following Sacramento State players were selected in the 1987 NFL draft.

Player	Position	Round	Overall	NFL team
Rob Harrison	Defensive back	10	254	Los Angeles Raiders
John Gesek	Guard, center	10	265	Los Angeles Raiders

The following finished their college career in 1986, were not drafted, but played in the NFL.

Player	Position	First NFL team
Angelo James	Defensive back	1987 Philadelphia Eagles
Lorenzo Lynch	Defensive back	1987 Chicago Bears
