= 1986 Cal State Hayward Pioneers football team =

American college football season

1986 Cal State Hayward Pioneers football
- Conference: Northern California Athletic Conference
- Record: 7–3 (3–2 NCAC)
- Head coach: Tim Tierney (12th season)
- Home stadium: Pioneer Stadium

1986 Northern California Athletic Conference football standings
	Conf.					Overall
Team	W		L		T	W		L		T
No. 2 UC Davis $^	5	–	0	–	0	10	–	1	–	0
Chico State	4	–	1	–	0	7	–	3	–	0
Cal State Hayward	3	–	2	–	0	7	–	3	–	0
Sonoma State	2	–	3	–	0	4	–	6	–	0
San Francisco State	1	–	4	–	0	2	–	9	–	0
Humboldt State	0	–	5	–	0	2	–	9	–	0
$ – Conference champion; ^ – NCAA Division II playoff participant; Rankings from NCAA Division II Football Committee poll

The 1986 Cal State Hayward Pioneers football team represented California State University, Hayward—now known as California State University, East Bay—as a member of the Northern California Athletic Conference (NCAC) during the 1986 NCAA Division II football season. Led by 12th-year head coach Tim Tierney, Cal State Hayward compiled an overall record of 7–3 with a mark of 3–2 in conference play, placing third in the NCAC. The Pioneers made their way into the top 20 of the NCAA Division II poll three times during the season, but each time they lost their next game. The team outscored its opponents 260 to 175 for the season. The Pioneers played home games at Pioneer Stadium in Hayward, California.

== Schedule ==
Date	Opponent	Rank	Site	Result	Attendance	Source
September 13	Saint Mary's*		Pioneer Stadium; Hayward, CA	W 34–7	1,300	
September 20	at Cal State Northridge*	No. 19	North Campus Stadium; Northridge, CA	L 7–20	1,000–4,144	
September 27	Cal Lutheran*		Pioneer Stadium; Hayward, CA	W 29–17	500–800	
October 4	Santa Clara*		Pioneer Stadium; Hayward, CA	W 31–12	1,400–1,500	
October 11	at Cal Poly*		Mustang Stadium; San Luis Obispo, CA	W 17–14	2,563	
October 18	at Sonoma State		Cossacks Stadium (Note: Seawolf Stadium was known as Cossacks Stadium until 2002 when the University changed the mascot from Cossacks to Seawolves.); Rohnert Park, CA	W 37–10	800–862	
October 25	No. 3 UC Davis	No. 20	Pioneer Stadium; Hayward, CA	L 14–24	8,500	
November 1	at Humboldt State		Redwood Bowl; Arcata, CA	W 24–22	600–2,600	
November 15	at Chico State	No. 19	University Stadium; Chico, CA	L 21–47	1,200–3,000	
November 22	San Francisco State		Pioneer Stadium; Hayward, CA	W 20–14	300–500	
*Non-conference game; Rankings from NCAA Division II Football Committee Poll released prior to the game

== Team players in the NFL ==
No Cal State Hayward Pioneers players were selected in the 1987 NFL draft. The following finished their college career in 1986, were not drafted, but played in the NFL.

Player	Position	First NFL team
Joe Terry	Linebacker	1987 Seattle Seahawks
