= 1986 Troy State Trojans football team =

American college football season

1986 Troy State Trojans football

GSC champion

NCAA Division II Semifinal, L 28–42 at South Dakota
- Conference: Gulf South Conference
- Record: 10–2 (8–0 GSC)
- Head coach: Rick Rhoades (2nd season)
- Offensive coordinator: Willie J. Slater (1st season)
- Offensive scheme: Wishbone
- Defensive coordinator: Robert Maddox (2nd season)
- Home stadium: Veterans Memorial Stadium

1986 Gulf South Conference football standings
	Conf.					Overall
Team	W		L		T	W		L		T
No. 3 Troy State $^	8	–	0	–	0	10	–	2	–	0
No. 13 Valdosta State	7	–	1	–	0	9	–	2	–	0
Mississippi College	5	–	3	–	0	7	–	4	–	0
Delta State	4	–	3	–	1	6	–	4	–	1
Jacksonville State	4	–	3	–	1	5	–	4	–	1
West Georgia	2	–	6	–	0	4	–	7	–	0
Livingston	2	–	6	–	0	3	–	8	–	0
Tennessee–Martin	2	–	6	–	0	3	–	8	–	0
North Alabama	1	–	7	–	0	4	–	7	–	0
$ – Conference champion; ^ – NCAA Division II playoff participant; Rankings from NCAA Division II Football Committee poll

The 1986 Troy State Trojans football team represented Troy State University—now known as Troy University as a member of the Gulf South Conference (GSC) during the 1986 NCAA Division II football season. Led by second-year head coach Rick Rhoades, the Trojans compiled an overall record of 10–2 with a mark of 8–0 in conference play, winning the GSC title. Troy State advanced to the NCAA Division II Football Championship playoffs, where they beat Virginia Union in the quarterfinals before losing to South Dakota in the semifinal. The Trojans played their home games at Veterans Memorial Stadium in Troy, Alabama.

== Schedule ==
Date	Opponent	Rank	Site	Result	Attendance	Source
September 6	at West Texas State*		Kimbrough Memorial Stadium; Canyon, TX	W 38–32	11,287	
September 13	Nicholls State*	No. 13	Veterans Memorial Stadium; Troy, AL	L 25–26	7,500	
September 27	Livingston	No. 11	Veterans Memorial Stadium; Troy, AL	W 28–6	7,500	
October 4	West Georgia	No. 10	University Stadium; Carrollton, GA	W 34–21	5,000	
October 11	No. 16 Valdosta State	No. 11	Veterans Memorial Stadium; Troy, AL	W 45–10	7,500	
October 18	at No. 6 Mississippi College	No. 10	Robinson–Hale Stadium; Clinton, MS	W 10–0	3,500	
October 25	at No. 17 Delta State	No. 6	Veterans Memorial Stadium; Troy, AL	W 31–13	3,000	
November 1	at North Alabama	No. 5	Braly Municipal Stadium; Florence, AL	W 38–9	5,000	
November 8	Tennessee–Martin	No. 4	Veterans Memorial Stadium; Troy, AL	W 50–30	10,000	
November 15	Jacksonville State	No. 3	Paul Snow Stadium; Jacksonville, AL (Battle for the Ol' School Bell)	W 45–43	9,000	
November 29	No. 5 Virginia Union*	No. 3	Veterans Memorial Stadium; Troy, AL (NCAA Division II Quarterfinal)	W 31–7	1,700	
December 6	at No. 6 South Dakota*	No. 3	DakotaDome; Vermillion, SD (NCAA Division II Semifinal)	L 28–42	9,500	
*Non-conference game; Rankings from NCAA Division II Football Committee Poll released prior to the game
