= 1986 Cal State Northridge Matadors football team =

American college football season

1986 Cal State Northridge Matadors football
- Conference: Western Football Conference
- Record: 8–3 (4–2 WFC)
- Head coach: Bob Burt (1st season)
- Defensive coordinator: Mark Banker (4th season)
- Home stadium: North Campus Stadium

1986 Western Football Conference standings
	Conf.					Overall
Team	W		L		T	W		L		T
Sacramento State $	5	–	1	–	0	6	–	4	–	1
No. 9 Cal State Northridge	4	–	2	–	0	8	–	3	–	0
Portland State	4	–	2	–	0	6	–	5	–	0
Southern Utah State	3	–	3	–	0	8	–	3	–	0
Cal Poly	3	–	3	–	0	5	–	5	–	0
Santa Clara	2	–	4	–	0	4	–	7	–	0
Cal Lutheran	0	–	6	–	0	3	–	8	–	0
$ – Conference champion; Rankings from NCAA Division II Football Committee poll

The 1986 Cal State Northridge Matadors football team represented California State University, Northridge as a member of the Western Football Conference (WFC) during the 1986 NCAA Division II football season. Led by first-year head coach Bob Burt, Cal State Northridge compiled an overall record of 8–3 with a mark of 4–2 in conference play, tying for second place in the WFC. The team outscored its opponents 307 to 198 for the season. The Matadors played home games at North Campus Stadium in Northridge, California.

== Schedule ==
Date	Opponent	Rank	Site	Result	Attendance	Source
September 13	at Sonoma State*		Cossacks Stadium; Rohnert Park, CA	W 35–17	2,140	
September 20	No. 19 Cal State Hayward*		North Campus Stadium; Northridge, CA	W 20–7	1,000–4,144	
September 27	at San Francisco State*	No. 15	Cox Stadium; San Francisco, CA	W 37–0	800–1,500	
October 4	at No. 19 Southern Utah State	No. 12	Eccles Coliseum; Cedar City, UT	L 20–49	3,400	
October 11	at Cal Lutheran	No. 19	Mt. Clef Field; Thousand Oaks, CA	W 17–3	2,570	
October 18	Cal Poly	No. 16	North Campus Stadium; Northridge, CA	W 21–20	4,206	
October 25	Saint Mary's*	No. 12	North Campus Stadium; Northridge, CA	W 48–24	6,144	
November 1	at Santa Clara	No. 10	Buck Shaw Stadium; Santa Clara, CA	W 38–32	1,458	
November 8	No. 2 UC Davis*	No. T–8	North Campus Stadium; Northridge, CA	L 20–25	6,244	
November 15	Portland State	No. 15	North Campus Stadium; Northridge, CA	W 34–0	4,100–4,106	
November 22	at Sacramento State	No. 9	Hornet Stadium; Sacramento, CA	L 17–21	3,400	
*Non-conference game; Rankings from NCAA Division II Football Committee Poll released prior to the game

== Team players in the NFL ==
No Cal State Northridge players were selected in the 1987 NFL draft.

The following finished their college career in 1986 were not drafted, but played in the NFL.

Player	Position	First NFL team
Chris Pacheco	Nose tackle	1987 Los Angeles Rams
