= Bob Giesey =

American football player and coach

Biographical details
- Born: c. 1946

Playing career
- 1964–1967: Dakota Wesleyan
- Position: Quarterback

Coaching career (HC unless noted)
- 1973–1974: Northern Colorado (GA/freshmen)
- 1975: Ripon (DC)
- 1976–1979: Ripon
- 1980–1982: Ball State (assistant)
- 1983–1984: Grand Valley State
- 1985–1996: Newman Smith HS (TX) (assistant)
- 1997–2010: American Heritage Academy (TX)

Head coaching record
- Overall: 30–27 (college)

Accomplishments and honors

Championships
- 2 MWC (1977–1978); 2 MWC East Division (1976–1977); 1 MWC Red Division (1978)

Bob Giesey (born c. 1946) is an American former football coach. He served as the head football coach at Ripon College in Ripon, Wisconsin from 1976 to 1979 and Grand Valley State University from 1983 to 1984, compiling a career college football coaching record of 30–27. Giesey lettered in football, basketball, and track and field at Dakota Wesleyan University.

== Head coaching record ==
=== College ===
Year	Team	Overall	Conference	Standing	Bowl/playoffs
Ripon Red Hawks (Midwest Conference) (1976–1977)
1976	Ripon	6–3	4–0	1st (East)	
1977	Ripon	8–1	4–0	1st (East)	
1978	Ripon	8–2	4–1	T–1st (Red)	
1979	Ripon	4–5	1–4	T–5th (Red)	
Ripon:		26–11	13–5		
Grand Valley State Lakers (Great Lakes Intercollegiate Athletic Conference) (1983–1984)
1983	Grand Valley State	4–6	3–3	T–4th	
1984	Grand Valley State	0–10	0–6	7th	
Grand Valley State:		4–16	3–9		
Total:		30–27			
National championship Conference title Conference division title or championship game berth
