= Bernie Anderson (American football) =

American football coach

Coaching career (HC unless noted)
- 1978–1979: Ishpeming HS (MI) (DC)
- 1980–1982: Three Lakes HS (WI)
- 1983: Western Michigan (assistant)
- 1984–1986: Michigan Tech (assistant)
- 1987–2005: Michigan Tech
- 2006–2011: Northern Michigan

Head coaching record
- Overall: 117–134 (college)
- Tournaments: 0–1 (NCAA D-II playoffs)

Accomplishments and honors

Championships
- 1 GLIAC (2004)

Bernie Anderson is an American former football coach.

== Early life ==
Anderson was born in Ishpeming, Michigan.

== Career ==
He served as the head football coach at Michigan Technological University from 1987 to 2005 and Northern Michigan University from 2006 to 2011, compiling a career college football coaching record of 117–134. During his first year at Northern, he hired Matt LaFleur to his first full-time coaching job.

Anderson retired to Marquette, Michigan.

== Head coaching record ==
=== College ===
Year	Team	Overall	Conference	Standing	Bowl/playoffs	AFCA^{#}
Michigan Tech Huskies (NCAA Division II independent) (1987–1993)
1987	Michigan Tech	2–7				
1988	Michigan Tech	6–4				
1989	Michigan Tech	2–7				
1990	Michigan Tech	6–4				
1991	Michigan Tech	6–4				
1992	Michigan Tech	9–1				
1993	Michigan Tech	6–4				
Michigan Tech Huskies (Midwest Intercollegiate Football Conference) (1994–1998)
1994	Michigan Tech	4–7	3–7	T–8th		
1995	Michigan Tech	5–5	5–5	6th		
1996	Michigan Tech	2–8	2–8	T–9th		
1997	Michigan Tech	2–8	2–8	10th		
1998	Michigan Tech	4–6	4–6	10th		
Michigan Tech Huskies (Great Lakes Intercollegiate Athletic Conference) (1999–2005)
1999	Michigan Tech	6–4	6–4	6th		
2000	Michigan Tech	5–5	5–5	T–5th		
2001	Michigan Tech	5–5	5–5	T–5th		
2002	Michigan Tech	3–7	3–7	T–9th		
2003	Michigan Tech	5–5	5–5	T–4th		
2004	Michigan Tech	9–2	9–1	T–1st	L NCAA Division II Second Round	11
2005	Michigan Tech	6–3	6–3	5th		
Michigan Tech:		93–96	55–64			
Northern Michigan Wildcats (Great Lakes Intercollegiate Athletic Conference) (2006–2011)
2006	Northern Michigan	3–7	3–7	T–10th		
2007	Northern Michigan	4–6	4–6	9th		
2008	Northern Michigan	2–8	2–8	T–9th		
2009	Northern Michigan	6–4	6–4	T–5th		
2010	Northern Michigan	5–6	5–5	T–3rd (North)		
2011	Northern Michigan	4–7	3–7	6th (North)		
Northern Michigan:		24–38	23–37			
Total:		117–134				
National championship Conference title Conference division title or championship game berth
^{#}Rankings from final NCAA Division II American Football Coaches Association (AFCA) poll.
