= 1986 NCAA Division II football season =

American college football season

- Regular season: August – November 1986
- Playoffs: November 29 – December 13, 1986
- National Championship: Braly Municipal Stadium; Florence, AL
- Champion: North Dakota State (3)
- Harlon Hill Trophy: Jeff Bentrim, North Dakota State

The 1986 NCAA Division II football season, part of college football in the United States organized by the National Collegiate Athletic Association at the Division II level, began in August 1986, and concluded with the NCAA Division II Football Championship on December 13, 1986, at Braly Municipal Stadium in Florence, Alabama, hosted by the University of North Alabama. The championship would remain hosted in Florence for the next twenty-eight seasons through 2013 before moving to Sporting Park in Kansas City, Kansas. The North Dakota State Bison defeated the South Dakota Coyotes, 27–7, to win their third Division II national title.

The first Harlon Hill Trophy, given to the best player in Division II, was awarded to Jeff Bentrim, quarterback for North Dakota State.

== Conference changes and new programs ==
Indiana Central University changed its name to the University of Indianapolis.

School	1985 Conference	1986 Conference
Michigan Tech	GLIAC	D-II Independent
Southern Utah	RMAC (NAIA)	Western
West Texas State	MVC (I-AA)	Lone Star (D-II)

== Conference standings ==
1986 Central Intercollegiate Athletic Association football standings
	Conf.					Overall
Team	W		L		T	W		L		T
Northern Division
No. 5 Virginia Union xy$^	7	–	0	–	0	11	–	1	–	0
Virginia State	5	–	2	–	0	6	–	4	–	0
Elizabeth City State	3	–	3	–	1	4	–	5	–	1
Norfolk State	3	–	4	–	0	4	–	6	–	0
Hampton	2	–	4	–	1	3	–	6	–	1
Saint Paul's (VA)	0	–	7	–	0	1	–	8	–	1
Southern Division
Winston-Salem State xy	7	–	0	–	0	7	–	4	–	0
North Carolina Central	6	–	1	–	0	6	–	4	–	0
Johnson C. Smith	4	–	3	–	0	5	–	5	–	0
Livingstone	2	–	4	–	1	3	–	5	–	2
Fayetteville State	1	–	5	–	1	2	–	7	–	1
Bowie State	0	–	7	–	0	0	–	9	–	0
Championship: Virginia Union 14, Winston-Salem State 7
$ – Conference champion; x – Division champion/co-champions; y – Championship game participant; ^ – NCAA Division II playoff participant; Rankings from NCAA Division II Football Committee poll

1986 Great Lakes Intercollegiate Athletic Conference football standings
	Conf.					Overall
Team	W		L		T	W		L		T
No. 3 Hillsdale $^	5	–	0	–	0	10	–	2	–	0
No. 17 Grand Valley State	4	–	1	–	0	9	–	2	–	0
Saginaw Valley State	3	–	2	–	0	5	–	4	–	0
Ferris State	2	–	3	–	0	5	–	5	–	0
Northwood	1	–	4	–	0	1	–	8	–	0
Wayne State (MI)	0	–	5	–	0	3	–	7	–	0
$ – Conference champion; ^ – NAIA Division I playoff participant; Rankings from NAIA Division I poll for Hillsdale and NCAA Division II Football Committee poll for Grand Valley State

1986 Gulf South Conference football standings
	Conf.					Overall
Team	W		L		T	W		L		T
No. 3 Troy State $^	8	–	0	–	0	10	–	2	–	0
No. 13 Valdosta State	7	–	1	–	0	9	–	2	–	0
Mississippi College	5	–	3	–	0	7	–	4	–	0
Delta State	4	–	3	–	1	6	–	4	–	1
Jacksonville State	4	–	3	–	1	5	–	4	–	1
West Georgia	2	–	6	–	0	4	–	7	–	0
Livingston	2	–	6	–	0	3	–	8	–	0
Tennessee–Martin	2	–	6	–	0	3	–	8	–	0
North Alabama	1	–	7	–	0	4	–	7	–	0
$ – Conference champion; ^ – NCAA Division II playoff participant; Rankings from NCAA Division II Football Committee poll

1986 Heartland Collegiate Conference standings
	Conf.					Overall
Team	W		L		T	W		L		T
Ashland $^	6	–	0	–	0	9	–	2	–	0
Indianapolis	5	–	1	–	0	7	–	2	–	0
Butler	3	–	3	–	0	5	–	5	–	0
Valparaiso	3	–	3	–	0	3	–	7	–	0
Saint Joseph's (IN)	2	–	4	–	0	6	–	4	–	0
Franklin (IN)	2	–	4	–	0	3	–	7	–	0
Evansville	0	–	6	–	0	2	–	8	–	0
$ – Conference champion; ^ – NCAA Division II playoff participant

1986 Lone Star Conference football standings
	Conf.					Overall
Team	W		L		T	W		L		T
West Texas State $	6	–	0	–	0	7	–	4	–	0
No. 8 Texas A&I	4	–	2	–	0	9	–	2	–	0
No. T–10 Abilene Christian	4	–	2	–	0	7	–	3	–	0
Eastern New Mexico	3	–	3	–	0	8	–	3	–	0
Angelo State	3	–	3	–	0	6	–	5	–	0
East Texas State	1	–	5	–	0	2	–	9	–	0
Howard Payne	0	–	6	–	0	0	–	10	–	0
$ – Conference champion; Rankings from NCAA Division II Football Committee poll

1986 Missouri Intercollegiate Athletic Association football standings
	Conf.					Overall
Team	W		L		T	W		L		T
Central Missouri State $	5	–	0	–	0	8	–	3	–	0
SE Missouri State	4	–	1	–	0	6	–	5	–	0
NE Missouri State	3	–	2	–	0	5	–	5	–	0
Missouri–Rolla	2	–	3	–	0	5	–	6	–	0
NW Missouri State	1	–	4	–	0	2	–	9	–	0
Lincoln (MO)	0	–	5	–	0	1	–	10	–	0
$ – Conference champion

1986 North Central Conference football standings
	Conf.					Overall
Team	W		L		T	W		L		T
No. 1 North Dakota State $^	9	–	0	–	0	13	–	0	–	0
No. 6 South Dakota ^	8	–	1	–	0	11	–	3	–	0
Mankato State	6	–	3	–	0	6	–	4	–	1
South Dakota State	5	–	4	–	0	6	–	5	–	0
Nebraska–Omaha	4	–	5	–	0	5	–	6	–	0
St. Cloud State	4	–	5	–	0	4	–	7	–	0
Augustana (SD)	3	–	6	–	0	5	–	6	–	0
Northern Colorado	3	–	6	–	0	3	–	8	–	0
North Dakota	2	–	7	–	0	2	–	9	–	0
Morningside	1	–	8	–	0	1	–	10	–	0
$ – Conference champion; ^ – NCAA Division II playoff participant; Rankings from NCAA Division II Football Committee poll

1986 Northern California Athletic Conference football standings
	Conf.					Overall
Team	W		L		T	W		L		T
No. 2 UC Davis $^	5	–	0	–	0	10	–	1	–	0
Chico State	4	–	1	–	0	7	–	3	–	0
Cal State Hayward	3	–	2	–	0	7	–	3	–	0
Sonoma State	2	–	3	–	0	4	–	6	–	0
San Francisco State	1	–	4	–	0	2	–	9	–	0
Humboldt State	0	–	5	–	0	2	–	9	–	0
$ – Conference champion; ^ – NCAA Division II playoff participant; Rankings from NCAA Division II Football Committee poll

1986 Northern Intercollegiate Conference football standings
	Conf.					Overall
Team	W		L		T	W		L		T
No. 11 Minnesota Morris $	5	–	0	–	1	7	–	1	–	2
No. 17 Northern State	5	–	1	–	0	9	–	2	–	0
Bemidji State	3	–	2	–	1	6	–	4	–	1
Winona State	2	–	3	–	1	3	–	7	–	1
Moorhead State	2	–	4	–	0	6	–	5	–	0
Southwest State (MN)	2	–	4	–	0	4	–	6	–	0
Minnesota Duluth	0	–	6	–	0	0	–	11	–	0
$ – Conference champion; Minnesota Duluth forfeited 8 wins and 2 ties including 4 conference wins—over Northern State, Winona State; Moorhead State, and Southwest State—and 2 conference ties—with Minnesota Morris and Bemidji State.; Rankings from NAIA Division I poll

1986 Pennsylvania State Athletic Conference football standings
	Conf.					Overall
Team	W		L		T	W		L		T
East Division
No. T–10 West Chester xy	6	–	0	–	0	8	–	3	–	0
No. 16 Millersville	5	–	1	–	0	9	–	1	–	0
Bloomsburg	3	–	2	–	1	7	–	2	–	1
Kutztown	3	–	2	–	1	5	–	4	–	1
Mansfield	1	–	5	–	0	3	–	7	–	0
Cheyney	1	–	5	–	0	2	–	8	–	0
East Stroudsburg	1	–	5	–	0	1	–	9	–	0
West Division
No. 14 IUP xy$	6	–	0	–	0	9	–	2	–	0
Edinboro	5	–	1	–	0	7	–	3	–	0
California (PA)	3	–	3	–	0	6	–	4	–	0
Slippery Rock	3	–	3	–	0	3	–	7	–	0
Clarion	2	–	4	–	0	5	–	5	–	0
Shippensburg	2	–	4	–	0	3	–	7	–	0
Lock Haven	0	–	6	–	0	1	–	9	–	0
Championship: IUP 20, West Chester 6
$ – Conference champion; x – Division champion/co-champions; y – Championship game participant; Rankings from NCAA Division II Football Committee poll

1986 Southern Intercollegiate Athletic Conference football standings
	Conf.					Overall
Team	W		L		T	W		L		T
Division II
No. 18 Albany State x	6	–	1	–	0	9	–	2	–	0
No. 15 Fort Valley State	5	–	2	–	0	7	–	3	–	0
Savannah State	3	–	3	–	0	6	–	4	–	0
Alabama A&M	2	–	2	–	1	5	–	4	–	1
Morehouse	2	–	4	–	0	4	–	5	–	1
Tuskegee	2	–	5	–	1	3	–	7	–	1
Morris Brown	1	–	5	–	1	2	–	7	–	1
Clark	0	–	6	–	0	1	–	9	–	0
Division III
Knoxville x	4	–	0	–	0	8	–	1	–	0
Lane	2	–	2	–	0	4	–	6	–	0
Miles	0	–	4	–	0	0	–	11	–	0
x – Division champion/co-champions; Rankings from 1986 NCAA Division II football rankings

1986 Western Football Conference standings
	Conf.					Overall
Team	W		L		T	W		L		T
Sacramento State $	5	–	1	–	0	6	–	4	–	1
No. 9 Cal State Northridge	4	–	2	–	0	8	–	3	–	0
Portland State	4	–	2	–	0	6	–	5	–	0
Southern Utah State	3	–	3	–	0	8	–	3	–	0
Cal Poly	3	–	3	–	0	5	–	5	–	0
Santa Clara	2	–	4	–	0	4	–	7	–	0
Cal Lutheran	0	–	6	–	0	3	–	8	–	0
$ – Conference champion; Rankings from NCAA Division II Football Committee poll

1986 NCAA Division II independents football records
	Conf.			Overall
Team	W	L	T	W		L		T
No. 4 Central State (OH) ^		–		10	–	1	–	1
No. T–18 New Haven		–		8	–	2	–	0
No. 7 Towson State ^		–		8	–	3	–	1
Southern Connecticut State		–		7	–	3	–	0
American International		–		6	–	4	–	0
UCF		–		6	–	5	–	0
Northern Michigan		–		5	–	5	–	0
Saint Mary's		–		5	–	5	–	0
Springfield		–		4	–	5	–	0
Michigan Tech		–		3	–	6	–	0
Kentucky State		–		1	–	9	–	0
Liberty		–		1	–	9	–	0
Central Connecticut		–		0	–	10	–	0
^ – NCAA Division II playoff participant; Rankings from NCAA Division II Football Committee poll

== Conference summaries ==
Conference Champions

Central Intercollegiate Athletic Association – Virginia Union
Great Lakes Intercollegiate Athletic Conference – Hillsdale
Gulf South Conference – Troy State
Heartland Collegiate Conference – Ashland
Lone Star Conference – West Texas State
Missouri Intercollegiate Athletic Association – Central Missouri State
North Central Conference – North Dakota State
Northern California Athletic Conference – UC Davis
Northern Intercollegiate Conference – Minnesota–Morris
Pennsylvania State Athletic Conference – Indiana (PA)
Rocky Mountain Athletic Conference – Colorado Mesa
South Atlantic Conference – Carson-Newman
Southern Intercollegiate Athletic Conference – Albany State
Western Football Conference - Sacramento State

== Postseason ==
1986 NCAA Division II Football Championship
- Teams: 8
- Finals Site: Braly Municipal Stadium; Florence, AL
- Champion: North Dakota State; (3rd title, 5th title game)
- Runner-up: South Dakota; (1st title game)
- Semifinalists: Central State (OH); Troy State
- Winning coach: Earle Solomonson; 2nd championship

The 1986 NCAA Division II Football Championship playoffs were the 14th single-elimination tournament to determine the national champion of men's NCAA Division II college football. The championship game was held at Braly Municipal Stadium in Florence, Alabama, for the first time.

=== Playoff bracket ===
First round Campus sites
North Dakota State	50
Ashland	0
Central State (OH)	31
Towson State	0
Troy State	31
Virginia Union	7
South Dakota	26
UC Davis	23

Semifinals; Campus sites
North Dakota State	35
Central State (OH)	12
Troy State	28
South Dakota	42

Championship; Braly Municipal Stadium; Florence, AL
North Dakota State	27
South Dakota	7

== See also ==
- 1986 NCAA Division I-A football season
- 1986 NCAA Division I-AA football season
- 1986 NCAA Division III football season
- 1986 NAIA Division I football season
- 1986 NAIA Division II football season
