= 1986 NCAA Division II football rankings =

The 1986 NCAA Division II football rankings are from the NCAA Division II football committee. This is for the 1986 season.

== Legend ==
	Increase in ranking
	Decrease in ranking
	Not ranked previous week
(#–#)	Win–loss record
(Italics)	Number of first place votes
т	Tied with team above or below also with this symbol

== NCAA Division II Football Committee poll ==
	Week 1 Sept 17	Week 2 Sept 24	Week 3 Oct 1	Week 4 Oct 8	Week 5 Oct 15	Week 6 Oct 22	Week 7 Oct 29	Week 8 Nov 5	Week 9 Nov 12	Week 10 Nov 19	
1.	North Dakota State (1–0) (3)	North Dakota State (2–0) (4)	North Dakota State (3–0) (4)	North Dakota State (4–0) (4)	North Dakota State (5–0) (4)	North Dakota State (6–0)	North Dakota State (7–0) (4)	North Dakota State (8–0) (4)	North Dakota State (9–0) (4)	North Dakota State (10–0) (4)	1.
2.	Texas A&I (2–0) (1)	Texas A&I (3–0)	Texas A&I (3–0)	Texas A&I (4–0)	Texas A&I (5–0)	Texas A&I (6–0)	Texas A&I (6–0)	UC Davis (7–0)	UC Davis (8–0)	UC Davis (9–0)	2.
3.	Towson State (2–0)	Towson State (2–0)	Towson State (3–0)	UC Davis (3–0)	UC Davis (4–0)	UC Davis (5–0)	UC Davis (7–0)	Central State (OH) (8–0)	Troy State (8–1)	Troy State (9–1)	3.
4.	UC Davis (0–0) (Note: In the actual printed polls, UC Davis was listed as California Davis)	UC Davis (1–0)	UC Davis (2–0)	Towson State (4–0)	Towson State (5–0)	Towson State (6–0)	Central State (OH) (6–1)	Troy State (7–1)	Central State (OH) (8–0–1)	Central State (OH) (9–0–1)	4.
5.	Mississippi College (1–1)	Mississippi College (2–1)	Central State (OH) (3–0) т	Central State (OH) (4–0)	Central State (OH) (5–0)	Central State (OH) (6–0)	Troy State (6–1)	Texas A&I (7–1) т	Virginia Union (9–0)	Virginia Union (10–0)	5.
6.	Central State (OH) (1–0)	Central State (OH) (2–0)	Mississippi College (3–1) т	Mississippi College (4–1)	Mississippi College (5–1)	Troy State (5–1)	Towson State (8–0)	Virginia Union (9–0) т	Millersville (9–0)	South Dakota (9–2)	6.
7.	Grand Valley State (1–0)	Albany State (2–0) т	Albany State (3–0)	Albany State (4–0)	Albany State (5–0)	Minnesota–Duluth (6–0–1)	Virginia Union (6–1) т	West Chester (7–1)	Abilene Christian (7–1)	Towson State (8–2)	7.
8.	Albany State (1–0)	Grand Valley State (2–0) т	Grand Valley State (3–0)	Grand Valley State (5–0)	Grand Valley State (5–0)	West Chester (5–1)	West Chester (7–0) т	Millersville (8–0) т	South Dakota (8–2)	Texas A&I (8–2)	8.
9.	Bloomsburg (1–0)	Bloomsburg (2–0)	New Haven (3–0)	New Haven (4–0)	New Haven (5–0)	Virginia Union (7–0)	Millersville (6–1)	Cal State Northridge (7–1) т	IUP (8–1)	Cal State Northridge (8–2)	9.
10.	Santa Clara (1–0)	Norfolk State (3–0)	Troy State (2–1)	Minnesota–Duluth (5–0)	Troy State (4–1)	Millersville (6–0)	Cal State Northridge (7–1)	Abilene Christian (6–1) т	Ashland (9–1)	Abilene Christian (7–2) т	10.
11.	Clarion (1–0)	New Haven (2–0) т	Minnesota–Duluth (4–0)	Troy State (3–1)	Minnesota–Duluth (5–0–1)	Grand Valley State (6–1)	Ashland (5–1)	Ashland (8–1) т	Texas A&I (7–2)	West Chester (8–2) т	11.
12.	Norfolk State (2–0)	Troy State (1–0) т	Cal State Northridge (3–0)	West Chester (3–1)	West Chester (4–1)	Cal State Northridge (5–1)	Abilene Christian (6–1)	IUP (7–1) т	Albany State (8–1)	Ashland (9–1)	12.
13.	Troy State (1–1)	Minnesota–Duluth (3–0)	North Alabama (2–1)	Eastern New Mexico (5–0)	Millersville (5–0)	Ashland (6–1)	IUP (6–2) т	South Dakota (7–2) т	Towson State (7–2)	Valdosta State (8–2)	13.
14.	Ashland (2–0)	Northeast Missouri State (2–1)	Eastern New Mexico (4–0)	Millersville (4–0)	Ashland (5–1)	Abilene Christian (4–1)	South Dakota (6–1) т	Albany State (7–1)	West Chester (7–2)	IUP (8–2)	14.
15.	New Haven (1–0) т	Cal State Northridge (2–0) (Note: In the actual printed polls, Cal State Northridge was sometimes listed as Northridge State)	West Chester (2–1)	Southern Utah State (5–1)	Abilene Christian (4–1)	IUP (5–1) т	Albany State (6–2)	Mississippi College (7–2)	Cal State Northridge (7–2)	Fort Valley State (7–2)	15.
16.	Minnesota–Duluth (2–0) т	North Alabama (2–1)	Millersville (3–0)	Valdosta State (3–1)	Cal State Northridge (4–1)	South Dakota (5–2) т	Mississippi College (6–2)	Towson State (6–2)	Valdosta State (7–2)	Millersville (9–1)	16.
17.	Abilene Christian (2–0)	Millersville (2–0)	Virginia Union (4–0)	Ashland (4–1)	Fort Valley State (4–1)	Delta State (4–1–1)	Minnesota–Duluth (6–0–2)	Valdosta State (6–2)	Eastern New Mexico (8–2)	Grand Valley State (9–2)	17.
18.	UCF (2–0)	South Dakota (2–1) т	Ashland (3–1)	Virginia Union (5–0)	Virginia Union (6–0)	Albany State (5–1)	Central Missouri State (7–2)	Central Missouri State (8–2)	Fort Valley State (7–2)	Albany State (8–2) т	18.
19.	Cal State Hayward (1–0) т (Note: In the actual printed polls, Cal State Hayward was sometimes listed as Hayward State)	Virginia Union (3–0) т	Southern Utah State (4–1)	Cal State Northridge (3–1)	UCF (4–2)	Mississippi College (5–2)	Valdosta State (5–2)	Sacramento State (5–2–1)	Cal State Hayward (6–2)	Minnesota–Duluth (7–1–2) т	19.
20.	Valdosta State (1–0) т	Ferris State (2–1)	Valdosta State (2–1)	Abilene Christian (3–1) т	IUP (4–1) (Note: In the actual printed polls, IUP was listed as Indiana (PA))	Cal State Hayward (5–1)	New Haven (6–1)	New Haven (7–1)	Grand Valley State (8–2)	New Haven (8–2) т	20.
21.				Fort Valley State (3–1) т							21.
	Week 1 Sept 17	Week 2 Sept 24	Week 3 Oct 1	Week 4 Oct 8	Week 5 Oct 15	Week 6 Oct 22	Week 7 Oct 29	Week 8 Nov 5	Week 9 Nov 12	Week 10 Nov 19	
		Dropped: 10 Santa Clara; 11 Clarion; 14 Ashland; 17 Abilene Christian; 18 UCF; 19 Cal State Hayward; 20 Valdosta State	Dropped: 9 Bloomsburg; 10 Norfolk State; 14 Northeast Missouri State; 18 South Dakota; 20 Ferris State	Dropped: 13 North Alabama	Dropped: 13 Eastern New Mexico; 15 Southern Utah State; 16 Valdosta State	Dropped: 9 New Haven; 17 Fort Valley State; 19 UCF	Dropped: 11 Grand Valley State; 17 Delta State; 20 Cal State Hayward	Dropped: 17 Minnesota–Duluth	Dropped: 15 Mississippi College; 18 Central Missouri State; 19 Sacramento State; 20 New Haven	Dropped: 17 Eastern New Mexico; 19 Cal State Hayward	
