= Bob Foster (American football, born 1941) =

American football player and coach (born 1941)

Biographical details
- Born: January 12, 1941

Playing career
- 1958–1961: Northern Branch / UC Davis
- Position: Running back

Coaching career (HC unless noted)
- 1963–1964: UC Davis (freshmen)
- 1965–1970: Vanden HS (CA) (assistant)
- 1971–1977: UC Davis (LB)
- 1978–1988: UC Davis (DC)
- 1989–1992: UC Davis
- 1995–1997: Willamette (defensive consultant)
- 1998–1999: Oregon (DC)
- 2002: California (LB)
- 2006: California (LB)
- 2009: Colorado (LB)
- 2016–?: UC Davis (consultant)

Head coaching record
- Overall: 30–11–1
- Tournaments: 0–2 (NCAA D-II playoffs)

Accomplishments and honors

Championships
- 3 NCAC (1989–1990, 1992)

Bob Foster (born January 12, 1941) is an American football coach. He served as the head football coach at the University of California, Davis (UC Davis) from 1989 to 1992, compiling a record of 30–11–1.

== Head coaching record ==
=== College ===
Year	Team	Overall	Conference	Standing	Bowl/playoffs
UC Davis Aggies (Northern California Athletic Conference) (1989–1992)
1989	UC Davis	8–3	5–0	1st	L NCAA Division II First Round
1990	UC Davis	7–3	5–0	1st	
1991	UC Davis	7–3	3–2	2nd	
1992	UC Davis	8–2–1	5–0	1st	L NCAA Division II First Round
Northern Branch:		30–11–1	16–6–2		
Total:		30–11–1			
National championship Conference title Conference division title or championship game berth
