= Bob Burt =

American football player and coach (1933–2019)

Biographical details
- Born: 1941 (age 84–85)

Playing career
- c. 1960: Adams State
- Positions: Center, defensive end

Coaching career (HC unless noted)
- 1962–1965: St. Paul HS (CA) (assistant)
- 1966–1968: Pater Noster HS (CA)
- 1969–1974: Santiago HS (CA)
- 1975: United States International
- 1976: UCLA (DL)
- 1977–1979: Hawaii (DC)
- 1980–1985: Cal State Fullerton (DC)
- 1986–1994: Cal State Northridge
- 1995–2007: Temescal Canyon HS (CA)
- 2008–2010: Notre Dame HS (CA)
- 2011: Glen A. Wilson HS (CA)
- 2012–2013: Cypress HS (CA)
- 2014: Santa Rosa Academy (CA)
- 2016: Fallbrook HS (CA)
- 2021: Verrado HS (AZ) (DC)

Head coaching record
- Overall: 56–49 (college)
- Tournaments: 0–1 (NCAA D-II playoffs)

Accomplishments and honors

Championships
- 1 WFC (1990)

Bob Burt (born 1941) is an American former football coach. He served as the head football coach at United States International University (USIU) in 1975 and California State University, Northridge from 1986 to 1994, compiling a career college football coaching record of 56–49. Burt also coached at a number of high schools in California between 1962 and 2016.

== Early life, playing career, and education ==
Burt attended San Pedro High School in the San Pedro neighborhood of Los Angeles, where he played football and baseball before graduating in 1958. He played college football at Adams State College—now known as Adams State University—Alamosa, Colorado as a center and defensive end. Burt graduated from Los Angeles State College—now known as California State University, Los Angeles–in 1962.

== Coaching career ==
Burt began his coaching career in 1962 as an assistant at St. Paul High School in Santa Fe Springs, California under head coach Marijon Ancich. In 1966, he was appointed to his first head coaching job, at Pater Noster High School in Los Angeles. After three years as head coach at Pater Noster, Burt moved on to Santiago High School in Garden Grove, California, where he served as head football coach for six years.

In 1975, Burt was hired as the head football coach at United States International University (USIU) in San Diego, but resigned after one season, in January 1976, citing a his long commute. He was living in Garden Grove and teaching at La Quinta High School in Westminster, California while coaching part-time at USIU.

Burt worked as the defensive line coach at University of California, Los Angeles (UCLA) in 1976. Following that season, UCLA's defensive coordinator, Dick Tomey, was hired the head football coach at the University of Hawaiʻi at Mānoa and took Burt with him as his defensive coordinator. After three years at Hawaii, Burt moved on to California State University, Fullerton, where he served as defensive coordinator for six seasons under head coach Gene Murphy.

== Head coaching record ==
=== College ===
Year	Team	Overall	Conference	Standing	Bowl/playoffs	NCAA^{#}
United States International Westerners (NCAA Division II independent) (1975)
1975	United States International	7–3				
Cal State Northridge Matadors (Western Football Conference) (1986–1992)
1986	Cal State Northridge	8–3	4–2	2nd		9
1987	Cal State Northridge	7–4	4–2	2nd		
1988	Cal State Northridge	6–5	2–4	T–5th		
1989	Cal State Northridge	6–5	4–2	T–2nd		
1990	Cal State Northridge	7–4	4–1	T–1st	L NCAA Division II First Round	13
1991	Cal State Northridge	3–7	1–4	5th		
1992	Cal State Northridge	5–5	3–2	T–2nd		
Cal State Northridge Matadors (American West Conference) (1993–1994)
1993	Cal State Northridge	4–6	1–3	T–4th		
1994	Cal State Northridge	3–7	0–3	4th		
Cal State Northridge:		49–46	23–23			
Total:		56–49				
National championship Conference title Conference division title or championship game berth
