= 1989 Chico State Wildcats football team =

American college football season

1989 Chico State Wildcats football
- Conference: Northern California Athletic Conference
- Record: 6–4 (4–1 NCAC)
- Head coach: Gary Hauser (1st season)
- Home stadium: University Stadium

1989 Northern California Athletic Conference football standings
	Conf.					Overall
Team	W		L		T	W		L		T
No. 16 UC Davis $^	5	–	0	–	0	8	–	3	–	0
Chico State	4	–	1	–	0	6	–	4	–	0
Humboldt State	3	–	2	–	0	6	–	4	–	0
Sonoma State	2	–	3	–	0	4	–	6	–	0
Cal State Hayward	1	–	4	–	0	1	–	8	–	0
San Francisco State	0	–	5	–	0	3	–	7	–	0
$ – Conference champion; ^ – NCAA Division II playoff participant; Rankings from NCAA Division II Football Committee poll

The 1989 Chico State Wildcats football team represented California State University, Chico as a member of the Northern California Athletic Conference (NCAC) during the 1989 NCAA Division II football season. Led by first-year head coach Gary Hauser, Chico State compiled an overall record of 6–4 with a mark of 4–1 in conference play, placing second in the NCAC. The team outscored its opponents 302 to 235 for the season. The Wildcats played home games at University Stadium in Chico, California.

== Schedule ==
Date	Opponent	Site	Result	Attendance	Source
September 2	at Santa Clara*	Buck Shaw Stadium; Santa Clara, CA	L 13–24	4,266	
September 9	at No. 5 Sacramento State*	Hornet Stadium; Sacramento, CA	L 28–48	5,800–6,000	
September 16	UC Santa Barbara*	University Stadium; Chico, CA	W 27–22	1,000–1,131	
September 23	at Saint Mary's*	Saint Mary's Stadium; Moraga, CA	L 16–26	2,045	
October 7	Southern Connecticut*	University Stadium; Chico, CA	W 33–20	1,310	
October 14	Humboldt State	University Stadium; Chico, CA	W 34–12	1,800–2,665	
October 21	San Francisco State	University CA; Chico, CA	W 45–18	524–729	
October 28	at Cal State Hayward	Pioneer Stadium; Hayward, CA	W 54–28	1,800	
November 4	at Sonoma State	Cossacks Stadium; Rohnert Park, CA	W 31–3	684	
November 11	No. 16 UC Davis	University Stadium; Chico, CA	L 21–34	6,707–8,684	
*Non-conference game; Rankings from NCAA Division II Football Committee Poll released prior to the game
