= 1989 Cal State Northridge Matadors football team =

American college football season

1989 Cal State Northridge Matadors football
- Conference: Western Football Conference
- Record: 6–5 (4–2 WFC)
- Head coach: Bob Burt (4th season)
- Defensive coordinator: Mark Banker (7th season)
- Home stadium: North Campus Stadium

1989 Western Football Conference standings
	Conf.					Overall
Team	W		L		T	W		L		T
No. 14 Portland State $^	4	–	1	–	0	9	–	4	–	0
Cal State Northridge	4	–	2	–	0	6	–	5	–	0
Southern Utah State	4	–	2	–	0	5	–	5	–	0
Santa Clara	3	–	3	–	0	7	–	4	–	0
Sacramento State	2	–	3	–	0	5	–	4	–	0
Cal Poly	1	–	4	–	0	5	–	5	–	0
Cal Lutheran	0	–	3	–	0	3	–	6	–	0
$ – Conference champion; ^ – NCAA Division II playoff participant; Rankings from NCAA Division II Football Committee poll

The 1989 Cal State Northridge Matadors football team represented California State University, Northridge as a member of the Western Football Conference (WFC) during the 1989 NCAA Division II football season. Led by fourth-year head coach Bob Burt, Cal State Northridge compiled an overall record of 6–5 with a mark of 4–2 in conference play, tying for second place in the WFC. The team was outscored by its opponents 257 to 231 for the season. The Matadors played home games at North Campus Stadium in Northridge, California.

== Schedule ==
Date	Opponent	Site	Result	Attendance	Source
September 2	at Long Beach State*	Veterans Stadium; Long Beach, CA	L 9–28	3,102	
September 9	at Cal State Fullerton*	Santa Ana Stadium; Santa Ana, CA	L 20–27	2,909	
September 16	Sonoma State*	North Campus Stadium; Northridge, CA	W 15–10	4,125	
September 23	Central State (OK)*	North Campus Stadium; Northridge, CA	W 31–28	3,050	
September 30	at Cal Poly	Mustang Stadium; San Luis Obispo, CA	W 13–10	4,200	
October 7	Cal Lutheran	North Campus Stadium; Northridge, CA	W 34–33	2,822	
October 14	at No. 18 Portland State	Civic Stadium; Portland, OR	L 17–33	10,723	
October 21	at No. 12 UC Davis*	Toomey Field; Davis, CA	L 7–24	7,151	
October 28	Santa Clara	North Campus Stadium; Northridge, CA	L 20–21	4,316	
November 4	at Sacramento State	Hornet Stadium; Sacramento, CA	W 24–13	2,479	
November 11	Southern Utah State	North Campus Stadium; Northridge, CA	W 41–30	2,744	
*Non-conference game; Rankings from NCAA Division II Football Committee Poll released prior to the game

== Team players in the NFL ==
The following Cal State Northridge players were selected in the 1990 NFL draft.

Player	Position	Round	Overall	NFL team
Barry Voorhees	Tackle	8	218	New York Giants
