= 1991 Cal State Northridge Matadors football team =

American college football season

1991 Cal State Northridge Matadors football
- Conference: Western Football Conference
- Record: 3–7 (1–4 WFC)
- Head coach: Bob Burt (6th season)
- Defensive coordinator: Mark Banker (9th season)
- Home stadium: North Campus Stadium

1991 Western Football Conference standings
	Conf.					Overall
Team	W		L		T	W		L		T
No. 8 Portland State $^	5	–	0	–	0	11	–	3	–	0
Southern Utah	4	–	1	–	0	7	–	3	–	1
Sacramento State	3	–	2	–	0	8	–	2	–	0
Cal Poly	2	–	3	–	0	4	–	6	–	0
Cal State Northridge	1	–	4	–	0	3	–	7	–	0
Santa Clara	0	–	5	–	0	5	–	6	–	0
$ – Conference champion; ^ – NCAA Division II playoff participant; Rankings from NCAA Division II Football Committee poll

The 1991 Cal State Northridge Matadors football team represented California State University, Northridge as a member of the Western Football Conference (WFC) during the 1991 NCAA Division II football season. Led by sixth-year head coach Bob Burt, Cal State Northridge compiled an overall record of 3–7 with a mark of 1–4 in conference play, placing fifth in the WFC. The team was outscored by its opponents 287 to 175 for the season. The Matadors played home games at North Campus Stadium in Northridge, California.

== Schedule ==
Date	Opponent	Site	Result	Attendance	Source
September 7	at Eastern Washington*	Woodward Field; Cheney, WA	L 13–20	3,028	
September 14	at Eastern New Mexico*	Greyhound Stadium; Portales, NM	W 12–10	3,000	
September 21	at Cal State Fullerton*	Santa Ana Stadium; Santa Ana, CA	L 10–17	2,921	
September 28	Central Oklahoma*	North Campus Stadium; Northridge, CA	W 9–7	3,766	
October 12	at UC Davis*	Toomey Field; Davis, CA	L 17–29	4,200	
October 19	Santa Clara	North Campus Stadium; Northridge, CA	W 45–27	4,390	
October 26	at Cal Poly	Mustang Stadium; San Luis Obispo, CA	L 16–28	1,931	
November 2	Southern Utah	North Campus Stadium; Northridge, CA	L 28–56	5,608	
November 9	at No. 10 Portland State	Civic Stadium; Portland, OR	L 13–38	10,751	
November 16	at Sacramento State	Hornet Stadium; Sacramento, CA	L 12–55	2,230	
*Non-conference game; Rankings from NCAA Division II Football Committee Poll released prior to the game
