= 1989 Humboldt State Lumberjacks football team =

American college football season

1989 Humboldt State Lumberjacks football
- Conference: Northern California Athletic Conference
- Record: 6–4 (3–2 NCAC)
- Head coach: Mike Dolby (4th season)
- Offensive coordinator: Bart Andrus (4th season)
- Home stadium: Redwood Bowl

1989 Northern California Athletic Conference football standings
	Conf.					Overall
Team	W		L		T	W		L		T
No. 16 UC Davis $^	5	–	0	–	0	8	–	3	–	0
Chico State	4	–	1	–	0	6	–	4	–	0
Humboldt State	3	–	2	–	0	6	–	4	–	0
Sonoma State	2	–	3	–	0	4	–	6	–	0
Cal State Hayward	1	–	4	–	0	1	–	8	–	0
San Francisco State	0	–	5	–	0	3	–	7	–	0
$ – Conference champion; ^ – NCAA Division II playoff participant; Rankings from NCAA Division II Football Committee poll

The 1989 Humboldt State Lumberjacks football team represented Humboldt State University—now known as California State Polytechnic University, Humboldt—as a member of the Northern California Athletic Conference (NCAC) during the 1989 NCAA Division II football season. Led by fourth-year head coach Mike Dolby, the Lumberjacks compiled an overall record of 6–4 with a mark of 3–2 in conference play, placing third in the NCAC. The team outscored its opponents 307 to 199 for the season. Humboldt State played home games at the Redwood Bowl in Arcata, California.

== Schedule ==
Date	Opponent	Site	Result	Attendance	Source
September 9	at UC Santa Barbara*	Campus Stadium; Santa Barbara, CA	L 17–24	1,227	
September 16	at Cal Poly*	Mustang Stadium; San Luis Obispo, CA	L 16–29	1,923–1,963	
September 23	Whittier*	Redwood Bowl; Arcata, CA	W 29–6	3,600	
September 30	Saint Mary's*	Redwood Bowl; Arcata, CA	W 30–3	3,750	
October 7	Menlo*	Redwood Bowl; Arcata, CA	W 67–7	3,950	
October 14	at Chico State	University Stadium; Chico, CA	L 12–34	1,800–2,665	
October 21	Sonoma State	Redwood Bowl; Arcata, CA	W 27–21	1,850	
October 28	San Francisco State	Redwood Bowl; Arcata, CA	W 45–27	1,700	
November 4	at UC Davis	Toomey Field; Davis, CA	L 13–35	6,765	
November 11	at Cal State Hayward	Pioneer Stadium; Hayward, CA	W 51–13	300–850	
*Non-conference game

== Team players in the NFL ==
The following Humboldt State players were selected in the 1990 NFL draft.

Player	Position	Round	Overall	NFL team
Dave Harper	Linebacker	11	277	Dallas Cowboys
