= 1991 Santa Clara Broncos football team =

American college football season

1991 Santa Clara Broncos football
- Conference: Western Football Conference
- Record: 5–6 (0–5 WFC)
- Head coach: Terry Malley (7th season)
- Home stadium: Buck Shaw Stadium

1991 Western Football Conference standings
	Conf.					Overall
Team	W		L		T	W		L		T
No. 8 Portland State $^	5	–	0	–	0	11	–	3	–	0
Southern Utah	4	–	1	–	0	7	–	3	–	1
Sacramento State	3	–	2	–	0	8	–	2	–	0
Cal Poly	2	–	3	–	0	4	–	6	–	0
Cal State Northridge	1	–	4	–	0	3	–	7	–	0
Santa Clara	0	–	5	–	0	5	–	6	–	0
$ – Conference champion; ^ – NCAA Division II playoff participant; Rankings from NCAA Division II Football Committee poll

The 1991 Santa Clara Broncos football team represented Santa Clara University as a member of the Western Football Conference (WFC) during the 1991 NCAA Division II football season. The Broncos were led by seventh-year head coach Terry Malley. They played home games at Buck Shaw Stadium in Santa Clara, California. Santa Clara finished the season with a record of five wins and six losses (5–6, 0–5 WFC). The Broncos outscored their opponents 309–281 for the season.

== Schedule ==
Date	Opponent	Site	Result	Attendance	Source
September 7	Chico State*	Buck Shaw Stadium; Santa Clara, CA	W 32–26	3,000	
September 14	at San Francisco State*	Cox Stadium; San Francisco, CA	W 31–16	2,000	
September 21	at No. 20 UC Davis*	Toomey Field; Davis, CA	L 21–31	6,300	
September 28	Cal State Hayward*	Buck Shaw Stadium; Santa Clara, CA	W 35–21	2,800–6,200	
October 5	Humboldt State*	Buck Shaw Stadium; Santa Clara, CA	W 28–23	4,400	
October 12	at Southern Utah	Eccles Coliseum; Cedar City, UT	L 31–37	3,792	
October 19	at Cal State Northridge	North Campus Stadium; Northridge, CA	L 27–45	4,390	
October 26	No. 20 Portland State	Buck Shaw Stadium; Santa Clara, CA	L 18–20	1,730	
November 2	at Cal Poly	Mustang Stadium; an Luis Obispo, CA	L 10–15	2,042	
November 9	No. T–19 Sacramento State	Buck Shaw Stadium; Santa Clara, CA	L 32–33	1,200	
November 16	Saint Mary's*	Buck Shaw Stadium; Santa Clara, CA	W 44–14	5,800	
*Non-conference game; Rankings from NCAA Division II Football Committee Poll released prior to the game
