= 1989 Cal Poly Mustangs football team =

American college football season

1989 Cal Poly Mustangs football
- Conference: Western Football Conference
- Record: 5–5 (1–4 WFC)
- Head coach: Lyle Setencich (3rd season)
- Home stadium: Mustang Stadium

1989 Western Football Conference standings
	Conf.					Overall
Team	W		L		T	W		L		T
No. 14 Portland State $^	4	–	1	–	0	9	–	4	–	0
Cal State Northridge	4	–	2	–	0	6	–	5	–	0
Southern Utah State	4	–	2	–	0	5	–	5	–	0
Santa Clara	3	–	3	–	0	7	–	4	–	0
Sacramento State	2	–	3	–	0	5	–	4	–	0
Cal Poly	1	–	4	–	0	5	–	5	–	0
Cal Lutheran	0	–	3	–	0	3	–	6	–	0
$ – Conference champion; ^ – NCAA Division II playoff participant; Rankings from NCAA Division II Football Committee poll

The 1989 Cal Poly Mustangs football team represented California Polytechnic State University, San Luis Obispo as a member of the Western Football Conference (WFC) during the 1989 NCAA Division II football season. Led by third-year head coach Lyle Setencich, Cal Poly compiled an overall record of 5–5 with a mark of 1–4 in conference play, placing fifth in the WFC. The team outscored its opponents 230 to 227 for the season. The Mustangs played home games at Mustang Stadium in San Luis Obispo, California.

== Schedule ==
Date	Opponent	Site	Result	Attendance	Source
September 9	West Texas State*	Mustang Stadium; San Luis Obispo, CA	W 31–10	4,123	
September 16	Humboldt State*	Mustang Stadium; San Luis Obispo, CA	W 29–16	1,923–1,963	
September 23	at No. 5 Angelo State*	Multi-Sports Complex; San Angelo, TX	L 20–45	6,100	
September 30	Cal State Northridge	Mustang Stadium; San Luis Obispo, CA	L 10–13	4,200	
October 7	Portland State	Mustang Stadium; San Luis Obispo, CA	L 26–55	2,315	
October 14	Kearney State*	Mustang Stadium; San Luis Obispo, CA	W 19–13	2,220	
October 21	at Sacramento State	Hornet Stadium; Sacramento, CA	L 15–16	3,713	
October 28	No. 12 UC Davis*	Mustang Stadium; San Luis Obispo, CA (rivalry)	W 28–21	5,745	
November 4	at Southern Utah State	Eccles Coliseum; Cedar City, UT	L 24–38	2,917	
November 11	No. 15 Santa Clara	Mustang Stadium; San Luis Obispo, CA	W 28–0	2,880	
*Non-conference game; Rankings from NCAA Division II Football Committee Poll released prior to the game
