= 1989 Sonoma State Cossacks football team =

American college football season

1989 Sonoma State Cossacks football
- Conference: Northern California Athletic Conference
- Record: 4–6 (2–3 NCAC)
- Head coach: Tim Walsh (1st season)
- Defensive coordinator: Gary Patterson (1st season)
- Home stadium: Cossacks Stadium

1989 Northern California Athletic Conference football standings
	Conf.					Overall
Team	W		L		T	W		L		T
No. 16 UC Davis $^	5	–	0	–	0	8	–	3	–	0
Chico State	4	–	1	–	0	6	–	4	–	0
Humboldt State	3	–	2	–	0	6	–	4	–	0
Sonoma State	2	–	3	–	0	4	–	6	–	0
Cal State Hayward	1	–	4	–	0	1	–	8	–	0
San Francisco State	0	–	5	–	0	3	–	7	–	0
$ – Conference champion; ^ – NCAA Division II playoff participant; Rankings from NCAA Division II Football Committee poll

The 1989 Sonoma State Cossacks football team represented Sonoma State University as a member of the Northern California Athletic Conference (NCAC) during the 1989 NCAA Division II football season. Led by first-year head coach Tim Walsh, Sonoma State compiled an overall record of 4–6 with a mark of 2–3 in conference play, placing fourth in the NCAC. The team was outscored by its opponents 205 to 196 for the season. The Cossacks played home games at Cossacks Stadium (Note: Cossacks Stadium was renamed in 2002 to Seawolf Stadium when the University changed the name of the mascot to Seawolves.) in Rohnert Park, California.

== Schedule ==
Date	Opponent	Site	Result	Attendance	Source
September 9	Cal Lutheran*	Cossacks Stadium; Rohnert Park, CA	W 17–9	1,374	
September 16	at Cal State Northridge*	North Campus Stadium; Northridge, CA	L 10–15	4,125	
September 23	at Menlo*	Atherton, CA	W 42–6	500	
September 30	at Cal State Hayward	Pioneer Stadium; Hayward, CA	W 38–10	750–3,000	
October 7	UC Santa Barbara*	Cossacks Stadium; Rohnert Park, CA	L 3–24	793	
October 14	No. 16 UC Davis	Cossacks Stadium; Rohnert Park, CA	L 19–28	1,872	
October 21	at Humboldt State	Redwood Bowl; Arcata, CA	L 21–27	1,850	
October 28	Saint Mary's*	Cossacks Stadium; Rohnert Park, CA	L 16–38	1,061	
November 4	Chico State	Cossacks Stadium; Rohnert Park, CA	L 3–31	684	
November 11	at San Francisco State	Cox Stadium; San Francisco, CA	W 27–17	800	
*Non-conference game; Rankings from NCAA Division II Football Committee Poll released prior to the game
