= John M. Williams =

American football coach (1935–2021)

Biographical details
- Born: December 10, 1935
- Died: September 2, 2021 (aged 85); Jackson, Mississippi, U.S.
- Education: Mississippi College (1957)

Coaching career (HC unless noted)
- 1957–1959: East Tallahatchie HS (MS) (assistant)
- 1960–1961: East Tallahatchie HS (MS)
- 1962–1964: Magee HS (MS)
- 1965–1971: Biloxi HS (MS)
- 1972–1990: Mississippi College

Head coaching record
- Overall: 122–81–3 (college)
- Tournaments: 7–3 (NCAA D-II playoffs)

Accomplishments and honors

Championships
- 1 NCAA Division II (1989); 3 GSC (1979, 1988, 1990)

Awards
- AFCA Division II COY (1989); 2× GSC Coach of the Year (1979, 1990)

John Marion Williams (December 10, 1935 – September 2, 2021) was an American college football coach. He served as the head football coach at Mississippi College in Clinton, Mississippi from 1972 to 1990, compiling and record of 122–81–3 and winning an NCAA Division II Football Championship in 1989. Before he was hired at Mississippi College in December 1971, Williams coached high school football in the state of Mississippi.

Williams died on September 2, 2021, at his home in Jackson, Mississippi.

== Head coaching record ==
=== College ===
Year	Team	Overall	Conference	Standing	Bowl/playoffs
Mississippi College Choctaws (Gulf South Conference) (1972–1990)
1972	Mississippi College	4–5–1	0–0	NA	
1973	Mississippi College	4–6	3–4	T–6th	
1974	Mississippi College	2–9	0–7	T–1st	
1975	Mississippi College	6–5	2–5	7th	
1976	Mississippi College	2–8	0–8	9th	
1977	Mississippi College	6–4	4–4	5th	
1978	Mississippi College	5–5	3–4	6th	
1979	Mississippi College	10–3	5–1	1st	L NCAA Division II Semifinal
1980	Mississippi College	4–5	2–4	5th	
1981	Mississippi College	6–4	3–3	T–4th	
1982	Mississippi College	8–3	6–1	2nd	
1983	Mississippi College	8–3	4–3	T–2nd	
1984	Mississippi College	6–2–1	5–2–1	T–2nd	
1985	Mississippi College	7–2–1	6–1–1	2nd	
1986	Mississippi College	7–4	5–3	3rd	
1987	Mississippi College	6–5	5–3	2nd	
1988	Mississippi College	9–3	7–1	T–1st	L NCAA Division II First Round
1989	Mississippi College	11–3	6–2	2nd	W NCAA Division II Championship
1990	Mississippi College	11–2	8–0	1st	L NCAA Division II Semifinal
Mississippi College:		122–81–3	74–56–2		
Total:		122–81–3			
National championship Conference title Conference division title or championship game berth
