= 1989 Cal State Hayward Pioneers football team =

American college football season

1989 Cal State Hayward Pioneers football
- Conference: Northern California Athletic Conference
- Record: 1–8 (1–4 NCAC)
- Head coach: Tim Tierney (15th season)
- Home stadium: Pioneer Stadium

1989 Northern California Athletic Conference football standings
	Conf.					Overall
Team	W		L		T	W		L		T
No. 16 UC Davis $^	5	–	0	–	0	8	–	3	–	0
Chico State	4	–	1	–	0	6	–	4	–	0
Humboldt State	3	–	2	–	0	6	–	4	–	0
Sonoma State	2	–	3	–	0	4	–	6	–	0
Cal State Hayward	1	–	4	–	0	1	–	8	–	0
San Francisco State	0	–	5	–	0	3	–	7	–	0
$ – Conference champion; ^ – NCAA Division II playoff participant; Rankings from NCAA Division II Football Committee poll

The 1989 Cal State Hayward Pioneers football team represented California State University, Hayward—now known as California State University, East Bay—as a member of the Northern California Athletic Conference (NCAC) during the 1989 NCAA Division II football season. Led by 15th-year head coach Tim Tierney, Cal State Hayward compiled an overall record of 1–8 with a mark of 1–4 in conference play, placing fifth in the NCAC. The team was outscored by its opponents 292 to 140 for the season. The Pioneers played home games at Pioneer Stadium in Hayward, California.

== Schedule ==
Date	Opponent	Site	Result	Attendance	Source
September 9	at Saint Mary's*	Saint Mary's Stadium; Moraga, CA	L 21–27	2,550	
September 23	at Santa Clara*	Buck Shaw Stadium; Santa Clara, CA	L 9–28	6,358	
September 30	Sonoma State	Pioneer Stadium; Hayward, CA	L 10–38	750–3,000	
October 7	at No. 17 UC Davis	Toomey Field; Davis, CA	L 7–31	5,650	
October 14	at Cal Lutheran*	Mt. Clef Field; Thousand Oaks, CA	L 14–26	1,720	
October 21	at UC Santa Barbara*	Harder Stadium; Santa Barbara, CA	L 12–30	150–700	
October 28	Chico State	Pioneer Stadium; Hayward, CA	L 28–54	1,800	
November 4	at San Francisco State	Cox Stadium; San Francisco, CA	W 26–7	100–300	
November 11	Humboldt State	Pioneer Stadium; Hayward, CA	L 13–51	300–850	
*Non-conference game; Rankings from NCAA Division II Football Committee Poll released prior to the game
