= Chuck Broyles =

American football player and coach (born 1947)

Biographical details
- Born: February 5, 1947 (age 79); Bremerton, Washington, U.S.

Playing career
- 1966–1968: Pittsburg State
- Positions: Defensive lineman, offensive lineman

Coaching career (HC unless noted)
- 1970–1971: Bishop Carroll HS (KS) (assistant)
- 1972: Pittsburg State (GA)
- 1973: Stockton HS (MO)
- 1974–1982: Missouri–Rolla (DC)
- 1983–1985: Miami HS (OK) (assistant)
- 1986–1987: Missouri–Rolla (DC)
- 1988–1989: Pittsburg State (assistant)
- 1990–2009: Pittsburg State

Administrative career (AD unless noted)
- 1996–2010: Pittsburg State

Head coaching record
- Overall: 198–47–2 (college)
- Bowls: 1–0
- Tournaments: 19–14 (NCAA D-II playoffs)

Accomplishments and honors

Championships
- 1 NCAA Division II (1991); 9 MIAA (1990–1992, 1994–1996, 2001, 2003–2004)

Awards
- AFCA Division II Coach of the Year (1991); Liberty Mutual Division II Coach of the Year (2008)

Charles Leroy Broyles (born February 5, 1947) is an American former football coach and college athletics administrator. He served as the head football coach at Pittsburg State University from 1990 to 2009, compiling a record of 198–47–2 in 20 seasons. His Pittsburg State Gorillas football teams won the NCAA Division II Football Championship in 1991, appeared three other championship games (1992, 1995 and 2004), and captured nine Mid-America Intercollegiate Athletics Association titles. Broyles retired from coaching at Pittsburg State effective December 2, 2009.

== Early life and playing career ==
Broyles was born in Bremerton, Washington and grew up in Mulberry, Kansas where he played eight-man football. He played on the defensive and offensive lines at Pittsburg State and graduated from the school in 1970.

== Coaching career ==
From 1970 to 1971, Broyles was an assistant coach at Bishop Carroll Catholic High School in Wichita, Kansas. He received an M.A. from Pittsburg in 1972 after serving as a graduate assistant with the football team. In 1973, he was coach of Stockton High School in Stockton, Missouri. He was a defensive coordinator for the University of Missouri-Rolla from 1974 to 1982. He was an assistant coach at Miami High School in Miami, Oklahoma from 1983 to 1985. He returned to Rolla as defensive coordinator in 1986 and 1987.

In 1988, Broyles was an assistant coach at Pittsburg. In his first season as head coach of Pittsburg in 1990, his team went 10–0 in the regular season and won two games in the Division playoffs. In his second season in 1991 he led the college to a 13–1–1 record and a national championship. He was named Division II Coach of the Year.

The powerhouse performance of Pittsburg led to a $5.8 million overhaul of Carnie Smith Stadium in 2000, a further $2.5 million renovation to the west end in 2006, including the addition of eight luxury boxes and the addition of a $1.7 million video board in 2007—the biggest in Division II at the time.

In 2008, he was named Liberty Mutual Coach of the Year. Broyles also plays the role as a husband, father, and grandfather. His wife, Helen, is a local Realtor. He has three sons, Scott, Kyle and Mark. Kyle died in 2008. Scott and his wife Bryna have three daughters, Ashley, Nicole and Jenna.

After previously announcing on November 5, 2009 his intention to stay on as head coach, on December 2, 2009 Broyles announced his retirement.

== Quotes ==
"We need to win this game. Then we can say ‘Chuck Broyles, head coach at Pittsburg State University 20 years and never had a losing season.’" — referring to the November 7, 2009 game against the Truman State University Bulldogs, which they lost, 28–21, giving Broyles his first losing season

== Head coaching record ==
=== College ===
Year	Team	Overall	Conference	Standing	Bowl/playoffs
Pittsburg State Gorillas (Mid-America Intercollegiate Athletics Association) (1990–2009)
1990	Pittsburg State	12–1	9–0	1st	L NCAA Division II Semifinal
1991	Pittsburg State	13–1–1	8–0–1	1st	W NCAA Division II Championship
1992	Pittsburg State	14–1	9–0	1st	L NCAA Division II Championship
1993	Pittsburg State	8–3	8–1	2nd	L NCAA Division II First Round
1994	Pittsburg State	10–1	9–0	1st	L NCAA Division II First Round
1995	Pittsburg State	12–1–1	9–0	1st	L NCAA Division II Championship
1996	Pittsburg State	8–3	8–1	T–1st	L NCAA Division II First Round
1997	Pittsburg State	9–2	8–1	2nd	L NCAA Division II First Round
1998	Pittsburg State	7–3	6–3	T–3rd	
1999	Pittsburg State	10–2	8–1	2nd	L NCAA Division II First Round
2000	Pittsburg State	9–3	7–2	3rd	L NCAA Division II First Round
2001	Pittsburg State	11–2	8–1	1st	L NCAA Division II Quarterfinal
2002	Pittsburg State	8–3	6–3	T–3rd	
2003	Pittsburg State	9–3	7–2	T–1st	L NCAA Division II First Round
2004	Pittsburg State	14–1	9–0	1st	L NCAA Division II Championship
2005	Pittsburg State	10–4	6–2	T–2nd	L NCAA Division II Quarterfinal
2006	Pittsburg State	10–2	7–2	2nd	W Mineral Water
2007	Pittsburg State	8–3	6–3	T–3rd	
2008	Pittsburg State	11–2	8–1	2nd	L NCAA Division II Second Round
2009	Pittsburg State	5–6	3–6	T–7th	
Pittsburg State:		198–47–2	149–29–1		
Total:		198–47–2			
National championship Conference title Conference division title or championship game berth

== See also ==
- List of college football career coaching winning percentage leaders
