= 1989 San Francisco State Gators football team =

American college football season

1989 San Francisco State Gators football
- Conference: Northern California Athletic Conference
- Record: 3–7 (0–5 NCAC)
- Head coach: Vic Rowen (29th season)
- Home stadium: Cox Stadium

1989 Northern California Athletic Conference football standings
	Conf.					Overall
Team	W		L		T	W		L		T
No. 16 UC Davis $^	5	–	0	–	0	8	–	3	–	0
Chico State	4	–	1	–	0	6	–	4	–	0
Humboldt State	3	–	2	–	0	6	–	4	–	0
Sonoma State	2	–	3	–	0	4	–	6	–	0
Cal State Hayward	1	–	4	–	0	1	–	8	–	0
San Francisco State	0	–	5	–	0	3	–	7	–	0
$ – Conference champion; ^ – NCAA Division II playoff participant; Rankings from NCAA Division II Football Committee poll

The 1989 San Francisco State Gators football team represented San Francisco State University as a member of the Northern California Athletic Conference (NCAC) during the 1989 NCAA Division II football season. Led by Vic Rowen in his 29th and final season as head coach, San Francisco State compiled an overall record of 3–7 with a mark of 0–5 in conference play, placing last out of six teams in the NCAC. For the season the team was outscored by its opponents 280 to 165. The Gators played home games at Cox Stadium in San Francisco.

Rowen finished his tenure at San Francisco State with a record of 120–163–10, for a .427 winning percentage. His teams won five conference championships and they in one bowl game, the Camellia Bowl in 1967.

== Schedule ==
Date	Opponent	Site	Result	Attendance	Source
September 9	Redlands*	Cox Stadium; San Francisco, CA	W 18–6	500	
September 16	Santa Clara*	Cox Stadium; San Francisco, CA	L 9–23	500	
September 23	UC Santa Barbara*	Cox Stadium; San Francisco, CA	W 32–14	500	
September 30	at UC Davis	Toomey Field; Davis, CA	L 14–35	6,230	
October 7	Saint Mary's*	Cox Stadium; San Francisco, CA	L 3–45	500	
October 14	at Menlo*	Atherton, CA	W 20–14	500	
October 21	at Chico State	University Stadium; Chico, CA	L 18–45	524–729	
October 28	at Humboldt State	Redwood Bowl; Arcata, CA	L 27–45	1,700	
November 4	Cal State Hayward	Cox Stadium; San Francisco, CA	L 7–26	100–300	
November 11	Sonoma State	Cox Stadium; San Francisco, CA	L 17–27	800	
*Non-conference game
