= 1989 Troy State Trojans football team =

American college football season

1989 Troy State Trojans football
- Conference: Gulf South Conference
- Record: 4–6 (3–5 GSC)
- Head coach: Robert Maddox (2nd season)
- Offensive coordinator: Willie J. Slater (4th season)
- Offensive scheme: Wishbone
- Defensive coordinator: Johnny Williams (2nd season)
- Home stadium: Veterans Memorial Stadium

1989 Gulf South Conference football standings
| | Conf. | | | | | Overall |
| Team | W | | L | | T | W | | L | | T |
|---|---|---|---|---|---|---|---|---|---|---|
| No. 2 Jacksonville State $^ | 8 | – | 0 | – | 0 | 13 | – | 1 | – | 0 |
| No. T–12 Mississippi College ^ | 6 | – | 2 | – | 0 | 11 | – | 3 | – | 0 |
| Valdosta State | 5 | – | 3 | – | 0 | 5 | – | 5 | – | 0 |
| Delta State | 4 | – | 3 | – | 1 | 6 | – | 3 | – | 1 |
| North Alabama | 4 | – | 4 | – | 0 | 6 | – | 5 | – | 0 |
| Troy State | 3 | – | 5 | – | 0 | 4 | – | 6 | – | 0 |
| West Georgia | 3 | – | 5 | – | 0 | 5 | – | 7 | – | 0 |
| Livingston | 1 | – | 6 | – | 1 | 0 | – | 3 | – | 7 |
| Tennessee–Martin | 1 | – | 7 | – | 0 | 0 | – | 2 | – | 9 |
$ – Conference champion; ^ – NCAA Division II playoff participant; Rankings from NCAA Division II Football Committee poll

The 1989 Troy State Trojans football team represented Troy State University (now known as Troy University) as a member of the Gulf South Conference (GSC) during the 1989 NCAA Division II football season. Led by second-year head coach Robert Maddox, the Trojans compiled an overall record of 4–6, with a mark of 3–5 in conference play, and finished tied for sixth in the GSC.

== Schedule ==
| Date | Opponent | Site | Result | Attendance | Source |
|---|---|---|---|---|---|
| September 2 | at Alabama State* | Cramton Bowl; Montgomery, AL | L 13–16 | 12,000 | |
| September 9 | at Livingston | Tiger Stadium; Livingston, AL | W 24–17 | 4,500 | |
| September 16 | UCF* | Veterans Memorial Stadium; Troy, AL | W 20–6 | 8,000 | |
| September 23 | West Georgia | Veterans Memorial Stadium; Troy, AL | L 14–28 | 6,200 | |
| September 30 | at Valdosta State | Cleveland Field; Valdosta, GA | L 14–20 | 5,138 | |
| October 7 | No. 18 Mississippi College | Veterans Memorial Stadium; Troy, AL | L 7–45 | 7,000 | |
| October 14 | at Delta State | Delta Field; Cleveland, MS | L 28–38 | 4,680 | |
| October 21 | North Alabama | Veterans Memorial Stadium; Troy, AL | W 23–16 | 10,000 | |
| October 28 | at Tennessee–Martin | Pacer Stadium; Martin, TN | W 14–6 | 2,250 | |
| November 4 | No. 2 Jacksonville State | Veterans Memorial Stadium; Troy, AL (rivalry) | L 3–38 | 8,000 | |
*Non-conference game; Rankings from NCAA Division II Football Committee Poll released prior to the game
