= 1991 UC Santa Barbara Gauchos football team =

American college football season

1991 UC Santa Barbara Gauchos football
- Conference: Independent
- Record: 5–3
- Head coach: Rick Candaele (2nd season)
- Home stadium: Harder Stadium

1991 NCAA Division II independents football records
	Conf.			Overall
Team	W	L	T	W		L		T
No. 20 Wofford ^		–		9	–	3	–	0
Springfield		–		7	–	3	–	0
Southern Connecticut State		–		6	–	3	–	0
UC Santa Barbara		–		5	–	3	–	0
Michigan Tech		–		6	–	4	–	0
Saint Mary's		–		6	–	5	–	0
Tennessee–Martin		–		5	–	6	–	0
Troy State		–		5	–	6	–	0
American International		–		4	–	5	–	1
New Haven		–		3	–	7	–	0
Wayne State (NE)		–		3	–	7	–	0
Kentucky State		–		2	–	9	–	0
Central Connecticut		–		1	–	8	–	1
Lees–McRae		–		1	–	9	–	0
^ – NCAA Division II playoff participant; Rankings from NCAA Division II Football Committee poll

The 1991 UC Santa Barbara Gauchos football team represented the University of California, Santa Barbara (UCSB) as an independent during the 1991 NCAA Division II football season. Led by Rick Candaele in his second and final season as head coach, the Gauchos compiled a record of 5–3 and were outscored by their opponents 218 to 217 for the season. The team played home games at Harder Stadium in Santa Barbara, California.

In 1992, the National Collegiate Athletic Association (NCAA) legislated that NCAA Division I colleges must play at that level in all sports. As UC Santa Barbara played at the Division I level in basketball and other sports, that would have required a significant upgrade to the football program. A new student fee to finance the football program was proposed to the students, but it was defeated. UC Santa Barbara was forced to drop the football program again. It had previously been discontinued after the 1971 season. Candaele finished his two-year stint as head coach with a record of 11–7 for a .611 winning percentage.

== Schedule ==
Date	Opponent	Site	Result	Attendance	Source
September 14	at Sonoma State	Cossacks Stadium (Note: Seawolf Stadium was known as Cossacks Stadium until 2002 when the University changed the mascot from Cossacks to Seawolves.); Rohnert Park, CA	L 7–33	860	
September 21	Cal Lutheran	Harder Stadium; Santa Barbara, CA	W 33–23	850–856	
September 28	at Chico State	University Stadium; Chico, CA	L 31–52	2,608	
October 5	at San Francisco State	Cox Stadium; San Francisco, CA	W 31–27	1,200	
October 12	Cal State Hayward	Harder Stadium; Santa Barbara, CA	W 42–28	250–913	
October 19	at Azusa Pacific	Cougar Athletic Stadium; Azusa, CA	W 28–7	3,000	
October 26	at Saint Mary's	Saint Mary's Stadium; Moraga, CA	L 3–41	2,158	
November 2	Azusa Pacific	Harder Stadium; Santa Barbara, CA	W 42–7	745	
