= 1989 Jacksonville State Gamecocks football team =

American college football season

1989 Jacksonville State Gamecocks football

GSC champion

NCAA Division II Championship Game, L 0–3 vs. Mississippi College
- Conference: Gulf South Conference
- Record: 13–1 (8–0 GSC)
- Head coach: Bill Burgess (5th season)
- Offensive coordinator: Charles Maniscalco (5th season)
- Defensive coordinator: Eddie Garfinkle (4th season)
- Home stadium: Paul Snow Stadium

1989 Gulf South Conference football standings
	Conf.					Overall
Team	W		L		T	W		L		T
No. 2 Jacksonville State $^	8	–	0	–	0	13	–	1	–	0
No. T–12 Mississippi College ^	6	–	2	–	0	11	–	3	–	0
Valdosta State	5	–	3	–	0	5	–	5	–	0
Delta State	4	–	3	–	1	6	–	3	–	1
North Alabama	4	–	4	–	0	6	–	5	–	0
Troy State	3	–	5	–	0	4	–	6	–	0
West Georgia	3	–	5	–	0	5	–	7	–	0
Livingston	1	–	6	–	1	0	–	3	–	7
Tennessee–Martin	1	–	7	–	0	0	–	2	–	9
$ – Conference champion; ^ – NCAA Division II playoff participant; Rankings from NCAA Division II Football Committee poll

The 1989 Jacksonville State Gamecocks football team represented Jacksonville State University as a member of the Gulf South Conference (GSC) during the 1989 NCAA Division II football season. Led by fifth-year head coach Bill Burgess, the Gamecocks compiled an overall record of 13–1 with a mark of 8–0 in conference play, winning the GSC title. For the second consecutive season, Jacksonville State advanced to the NCAA Division II Football Championship playoffs, beating Alabama A&M in the first round, North Dakota State in the quarterfinals, and Angelo State in the semifinals, before losing to Mississippi College in the championship game. In 1993, the NCAA vacated Mississippi College's championship as a result of numerous violations, but the Gamecocks are still recognized as runner-up.

== Schedule ==
Date	Opponent	Rank	Site	Result	Attendance	Source
September 2	at Samford*	No. 4	Seibert Stadium; Homewood, AL (rivalry)	W 19–9	10,136	
September 9	Alabama A&M*	No. 4	Paul Snow Stadium; Jacksonville, AL	W 42–21	16,000	
September 16	at West Georgia	No. 4	Grisham Stadium; Carrollton, GA	W 38–6	6,100	
September 23	Valdosta State	No. 3	Paul Snow Stadium; Jacksonville, AL	W 17–15	8,500	
September 30	at No. 8 Mississippi College	No. 3	Robinson-Hale Stadium; Clinton, MS	W 23–3	7,500	
October 7	Delta State	No. 3	Paul Snow Stadium; Jacksonville, AL	W 34–10	12,500	
October 14	at North Alabama	No. 3	Braly Municipal Stadium; Florence, AL	W 12–3	7,140	
October 21	Tennessee–Martin	No. 3	Paul Snow Stadium; Jacksonville, AL	W 63–0	11,000	
November 4	at Troy State	No. 2	Veterans Memorial Stadium; Troy, AL (rivalry)	W 38–3	8,000	
November 11	Livingston	No. 2	Paul Snow Stadium; Jacksonville, AL	W 36–0	14,500	
November 18	Alabama A&M*	No. 2	Paul Snow Stadium; Jacksonville, AL (NCAA Division II First Round)	W 33–9	9,500	
November 25	No. 17 North Dakota State*	No. 2	Paul Snow Stadium; Jacksonville, AL (NCAA Division II Quarterfinal)	W 21–17	8,500	
December 2	No. T–5 Angelo State*	No. 2	Paul Snow Stadium; Jacksonville, AL (NCAA Division II Semifinal)	W 34–16	6,500	
December 9	vs. No. T–12 Mississippi College	No. 2	Braly Municipal Stadium; Florence, AL (NCAA Division II Championship Game)	L 0–3	10,538	
*Non-conference game; Rankings from NCAA Division II Football Committee Poll released prior to the game
