= 1991 Chico State Wildcats football team =

American college football season

1991 Chico State Wildcats football
- Conference: Northern California Athletic Conference
- Record: 4–6 (2–3 NCAC)
- Head coach: Gary Hauser (3rd season)
- Home stadium: University Stadium

1991 Northern California Athletic Conference football standings
	Conf.					Overall
Team	W		L		T	W		L		T
Sonoma State $	5	–	0	–	0	9	–	2	–	0
UC Davis	3	–	2	–	0	7	–	3	–	0
Humboldt State	2	–	3	–	0	6	–	5	–	0
Chico State	2	–	3	–	0	4	–	6	–	0
San Francisco State	2	–	3	–	0	3	–	7	–	0
Cal State Hayward	1	–	4	–	0	3	–	7	–	0
$ – Conference champion

The 1991 Chico State Wildcats football team represented California State University, Chico as a member of the Northern California Athletic Conference (NCAC) during the 1991 NCAA Division II football season. Led by third-year head coach Gary Hauser, Chico State compiled an overall record of 4–6 with a mark of 2–3 in conference play, placing in a three-way tie for third in the NCAC. The team was outscored by its opponents 300 to 243 for the season. The Wildcats played home games at University Stadium in Chico, California.

== Schedule ==
Date	Opponent	Site	Result	Attendance	Source
September 7	at Santa Clara*	Buck Shaw Stadium; Santa Clara, CA	L 26–32	3,000	
September 14	Carroll (MT)*	University Stadium; Chico, CA	W 25–7		
September 28	UC Santa Barbara*	University Stadium; Chico, CA	W 52–31	2,608	
October 5	at Saint Mary's*	Saint Mary's Stadium; Moraga, CA	L 14–38		
October 12	Sacramento State*	University Stadium; Chico, CA	L 21–63	6,248	
October 19	San Francisco State	University Stadium; Chico, CA	L 17–34	2,267	
October 26	UC Davis	University Stadium; Chico, CA	W 24–20	3,012	
November 2	at Sonoma State	Cossacks Stadium; Rohnert Park, CA	L 17–38	1,500–1,572	
November 9	Humboldt State	University Stadium; Chico, CA	L 17–29	1,724	
November 16	at Cal State Hayward	Pioneer Stadium; Hayward, CA	W 30–8	400	
*Non-conference game
