= 1991 Pittsburg State Gorillas football team =

American college football season

1991 Pittsburg State Gorillas football

NCAA Division II champion MIAA champion

NCAA Division II Championship Game, W 23–6 vs. Jacksonville State
- Conference: Missouri Intercollegiate Athletic Association
- Record: 13–1–1 (.900) (8–0–1 (.944) MIAA)
- Head coach: Chuck Broyles (2nd season)
- Offensive coordinator: Jerry Kill (1st as OC; 4th overall season)
- Home stadium: Carnie Smith Stadium

1991 Missouri Intercollegiate Athletic Association football standings
	Conf.					Overall
Team	W		L		T	W		L		T
No. 3 Pittsburg State $^	8	–	0	–	1	13	–	1	–	1
Missouri Southern	7	–	2	–	0	8	–	3	–	0
Southwest Baptist	5	–	4	–	0	7	–	4	–	0
Central Missouri State	5	–	4	–	0	5	–	6	–	0
NE Missouri State	5	–	4	–	0	5	–	6	–	0
Emporia State	4	–	5	–	0	5	–	5	–	0
NW Missouri State	4	–	5	–	0	5	–	6	–	0
Missouri–Rolla	3	–	5	–	1	4	–	6	–	1
Missouri Western	2	–	7	–	0	4	–	7	–	0
Washburn	1	–	8	–	0	1	–	10	–	0
$ – Conference champion; ^ – NCAA Division II playoff participant; Rankings from NCAA Division II Football Committee poll

The 1991 Pittsburg State Gorillas football team was an American football team that won the 1991 NCAA Division II national championship.

The team represented Pittsburg State University as a member of the Missouri Intercollegiate Athletic Association (MIAA) during the 1991 NCAA Division II football season. In their second season under head coach Chuck Broyles, the Gorillas compiled a 13–1–1 record (8–0–1 against conference opponents), won the MIAA championship, and outscored opponents by a total of 555 to 226. They qualified to participate in the Division II playoffs and advanced to the national championship game, defeating Jacksonville State by a 23–6 score. It was Pittsburg State's third national championship.

Wide receiver and return specialist Ronnie West received the Harlon Hill Trophy as the best player in Division II football.

The season was the 84th for Pittsburg State competing in football and its second as a member of NCAA Division II after moving from NAIA. The team played its home games in at Carnie Smith Stadium in Pittsburg, Kansas.

== Schedule ==
Date	Opponent	Rank	Site	Result	Attendance	Source
September 7	Friends*	No. 2	Carnie Smith Stadium; Pittsburg, KS	W 59–7	5,500	
September 14	at No. 7 East Texas State*	No. 2	Memorial Stadium; Commerce, TX	L 13–20	8,200	
September 21	at Southwest Baptist	No. 7	Bolivar, MO	W 23–17	2,519	
September 28	Missouri–Rolla	No. 13	Carnie Smith Stadium; Pittsburg, KS	T 6–6	5,800	
October 5	No. 17 Northwest Missouri State		Carnie Smith Stadium; Pittsburg, KS	W 38–0	4,500	
October 12	at Northeast Missouri State	No. 17	Kirksville, MO	W 55–20	3,500	
October 19	Missouri Western	No. 12	Carnie Smith Stadium; Pittsburg, KS	W 59–14	6,300	
October 26	at Missouri Southern	No. 10	Joplin, MO	W 43–21	8,500	
November 2	Emporia State	No. 7	Carnie Smith Stadium; Pittsburg, KS	W 70–36	2,800	
November 9	at Washburn	No. 3	Topeka, KS	W 21–0	1,615	
November 16	No. 5 Central Missouri State	No. 3	Carnie Smith Stadium; Pittsburg, KS	W 28–14	2,800	
November 23	Butler*	No. 3	Carnie Smith Stadium; Pittsburg, KS (NCAA Division II first round)	W 26–16		
November 30	No. 19 East Texas State*	No. 3	Carnie Smith Stadium; Pittsburg, KS (NCAA Division II quarterfinal)	W 38–28	5,000	
December 7	at No. 8 Portland State*	No. 3	Civic Stadium; Portland, OR (NCAA Division II semifinal)	W 53–21	17,036	
December 14	vs. No. 2 Jacksonville State*		Braly Municipal Stadium; Florence, AL (NCAA Division II Championship Game)	W 23–6	11,682	
*Non-conference game; Rankings from NCAA Division II Football Committee Poll released prior to the game
