= 1991 Cal State Hayward Pioneers football team =

American college football season

1991 Cal State Hayward Pioneers football
- Conference: Northern California Athletic Conference
- Record: 3–7 (1–4 NCAC)
- Head coach: Tim Tierney (17th season)
- Home stadium: Pioneer Stadium

1991 Northern California Athletic Conference football standings
	Conf.					Overall
Team	W		L		T	W		L		T
Sonoma State $	5	–	0	–	0	9	–	2	–	0
UC Davis	3	–	2	–	0	7	–	3	–	0
Humboldt State	2	–	3	–	0	6	–	5	–	0
Chico State	2	–	3	–	0	4	–	6	–	0
San Francisco State	2	–	3	–	0	3	–	7	–	0
Cal State Hayward	1	–	4	–	0	3	–	7	–	0
$ – Conference champion

The 1991 Cal State Hayward Pioneers football team represented California State University, Hayward—now known as California State University, East Bay—as a member of the Northern California Athletic Conference (NCAC) during the 1991 NCAA Division II football season. Led by 17th-year head coach Tim Tierney, Cal State Hayward compiled an overall record of 3–7 with a mark of 1–4 in conference play, placing last out of six teams in the NCAC. The team was outscored by its opponents 254 to 186 for the season. The Pioneers played home games at Pioneer Stadium in Hayward, California.

== Schedule ==
Date	Opponent	Site	Result	Attendance	Source
September 14	Cal Lutheran*	Pioneer Stadium; Hayward, CA	W 27–0	400	
September 21	at Saint Mary's*	Saint Mary's Stadium; Moraga, CA	L 19–51	3,000	
September 28	at Santa Clara*	Buck Shaw Stadium; Santa Clara, CA	L 21–35	2,800–6,200	
October 5	San Diego*	Pioneer Stadium; Hayward, CA	W 21–20	350–1,500	
October 12	at UC Santa Barbara*	Harder Stadium; Santa Barbara, CA	L 31–42	250–913	
October 19	Sonoma State	Pioneer Stadium; Hayward, CA	L 13–22	428–900	
October 26	at San Francisco State	Cox Stadium; San Francisco, CA	L 17–32	350–1,500	
November 2	Humboldt State	Pioneer Stadium; Hayward, CA	W 16–6	800	
November 9	at UC Davis	Toomey Field; Davis, CA	L 13–16	3,800–4,200	
November 16	Chico State	Pioneer Stadium; Hayward, CA	L 8–30	400	
*Non-conference game
