= 1989 Santa Clara Broncos football team =

American college football season

1989 Santa Clara Broncos football
- Conference: Western Football Conference
- Record: 7–4 (3–3 WFC)
- Head coach: Terry Malley (5th season)
- Home stadium: Buck Shaw Stadium

1989 Western Football Conference standings
	Conf.					Overall
Team	W		L		T	W		L		T
No. 14 Portland State $^	4	–	1	–	0	9	–	4	–	0
Cal State Northridge	4	–	2	–	0	6	–	5	–	0
Southern Utah State	4	–	2	–	0	5	–	5	–	0
Santa Clara	3	–	3	–	0	7	–	4	–	0
Sacramento State	2	–	3	–	0	5	–	4	–	0
Cal Poly	1	–	4	–	0	5	–	5	–	0
Cal Lutheran	0	–	3	–	0	3	–	6	–	0
$ – Conference champion; ^ – NCAA Division II playoff participant; Rankings from NCAA Division II Football Committee poll

The 1989 Santa Clara Broncos football team represented Santa Clara University as a member of the Western Football Conference (WFC) during the 1989 NCAA Division II football season. The Broncos were led by fifth-year head coach Terry Malley. They played home games at Buck Shaw Stadium in Santa Clara, California. Santa Clara finished the season with a record of seven wins and four losses (7–4, 3–3 WFC). The Broncos outscored their opponents 250–211 for the season.

== Schedule ==
Date	Opponent	Rank	Site	Result	Attendance	Source
September 2	Chico State*		Buck Shaw Stadium; Santa Clara, CA	W 24–13	4,266	
September 9	at No. 15 UC Davis*		Toomey Field; Davis, CA	L 27–28	7,654	
September 16	at San Francisco State*		Cox Stadium; San Francisco, CA	W 23–9	300	
September 23	Cal State Hayward*		Buck Shaw Stadium; Santa Clara, CA	W 28–9	6,358	
September 30	Portland State		Buck Shaw Stadium; Santa Clara, CA	L 17–27	6,207	
October 7	at Southern Utah State		Eccles Coliseum; Cedar City, UT	L 21–28	4,198	
October 14	No. 8 Sacramento State		Buck Shaw Stadium; Santa Clara, CA	W 21–16	7,392	
October 21	Cal Lutheran		Buck Shaw Stadium; Santa Clara, CA	W 38–15	1,179	
October 28	at Cal State Northridge		North Campus Stadium; Northridge, CA	W 21–20	4,316	
November 4	Saint Mary's*	No. 18	Buck Shaw Stadium; Santa Clara, CA	W 30–18	8,200	
November 11	at Cal Poly	No. 15	Mustang Stadium; San Luis Obispo, CA	L 0–28	2,880	
*Non-conference game; Rankings from NCAA Division II Football Committee Poll released prior to the game

== Team players in the NFL ==
No Santa Clara Broncos players were selected in the 1990 NFL draft.

The following finished their college career in 1989, were not drafted, but played in the NFL.

Player	Position	First NFL team
Bryan Barker	Punter	1990 Kansas City Chiefs
