= 1991 Cal Poly Mustangs football team =

American college football season

1991 Cal Poly Mustangs football
- Conference: Western Football Conference
- Record: 4–6 (2–3 WFC)
- Head coach: Lyle Setencich (5th season)
- Home stadium: Mustang Stadium

1991 Western Football Conference standings
	Conf.					Overall
Team	W		L		T	W		L		T
No. 8 Portland State $^	5	–	0	–	0	11	–	3	–	0
Southern Utah	4	–	1	–	0	7	–	3	–	1
Sacramento State	3	–	2	–	0	8	–	2	–	0
Cal Poly	2	–	3	–	0	4	–	6	–	0
Cal State Northridge	1	–	4	–	0	3	–	7	–	0
Santa Clara	0	–	5	–	0	5	–	6	–	0
$ – Conference champion; ^ – NCAA Division II playoff participant; Rankings from NCAA Division II Football Committee poll

The 1991 Cal Poly Mustangs football team represented California Polytechnic State University, San Luis Obispo as a member of the Western Football Conference (WFC) during the 1991 NCAA Division II football season. Led by fifth-year head coach Lyle Setencich, Cal Poly compiled an overall record of 4–6 with a mark of 2–3 in conference play, placing fourth in the WFC. The team was outscored by its opponents 272 to 271 for the season. The Mustangs played home games at Mustang Stadium in San Luis Obispo, California.

== Schedule ==
Date	Opponent	Rank	Site	Result	Attendance	Source
September 14	UC Davis*	No. 17	Mustang Stadium; San Luis Obispo, CA (rivalry)	L 28–31	3,263	
September 21	at Sonoma State*		Cossacks Stadium; Rohnert Park, CA	L 7–27	1,262–5,164	
September 28	at No. 19 Angelo State*		Multi-Sports Complex; San Angelo, TX	W 23–13	10,200	
October 5	Nebraska–Kearney*		Mustang Stadium; San Luis Obispo, CA	W 66–3	2,743	
October 12	at Pacific (CA)*		Stagg Memorial Stadium; Stockton, CA	L 28–63	7,601–7,604	
October 19	at No. 6 Sacramento State		Hornet Stadium; Sacramento, CA	L 20–21	4,100	
October 26	Cal State Northridge		Mustang Stadium; San Luis Obispo, CA	W 28–16	1,931	
November 2	Santa Clara		Mustang Stadium; San Luis Obispo, CA	W 15–10	2,042	
November 9	at Southern Utah		Eccles Coliseum; Cedar City, UT	L 21–33	4,107	
November 16	No. 8 Portland State		Mustang Stadium; San Luis Obispo, CA	L 35–55	5,996	
*Non-conference game; Rankings from NCAA Division II Football Committee Poll released prior to the game
