= 1991 Sonoma State Cossacks football team =

American college football season

1991 Sonoma State Cossacks football

NCAC champion
- Conference: Northern California Athletic Conference
- Record: 9–2 (5–0 NCAC)
- Head coach: Tim Walsh (3rd season)
- Defensive coordinator: Gary Patterson (3rd season)
- Home stadium: Cossacks Stadium

1991 Northern California Athletic Conference football standings
	Conf.					Overall
Team	W		L		T	W		L		T
Sonoma State $	5	–	0	–	0	9	–	2	–	0
UC Davis	3	–	2	–	0	7	–	3	–	0
Humboldt State	2	–	3	–	0	6	–	5	–	0
Chico State	2	–	3	–	0	4	–	6	–	0
San Francisco State	2	–	3	–	0	3	–	7	–	0
Cal State Hayward	1	–	4	–	0	3	–	7	–	0
$ – Conference champion

The 1991 Sonoma State Cossacks football team represented Sonoma State University as a member of the Northern California Athletic Conference (NCAC) during the 1991 NCAA Division II football season. Led by third-year head coach Tim Walsh, Sonoma State compiled an overall record of 9–2 with a mark of 5–0 in conference play, winning the NCAC title. The team outscored its opponents 265 to 175 for the season. The Cossacks played home games at Cossacks Stadium (Note: Cossacks Stadium was renamed in 2002 to Seawolf Stadium when the University changed the name of the mascot to Seawolves.) in Rohnert Park, California.

The nine wins and .818 winning percentage in 1991 were the best marks for the Sonoma State Cossacks football program in its 20 seasons of competition. Sonoma State's NCAC title also broke a string of 20 consecutive conference championships by UC Davis.

== Schedule ==
Date	Opponent	Site	Result	Attendance	Source
September 7	at No. 3 Idaho*	Kibbie Dome; Moscow, ID	L 7–49	10,000	
September 14	UC Santa Barbara*	Cossacks Stadium; Rohnert Park, CA	W 33–7	860	
September 21	Cal Poly*	Cossacks Stadium; Rohnert Park, CA	W 27–7	1,262–5,164	
September 28	at Portland State*	Civic Stadium; Portland, OR	L 6–30	8,106	
October 5	Cal Lutheran*	Cossacks Stadium; Rohnert Park, CA	W 28–0	671	
October 12	Saint Mary's*	Cossacks Stadium; Rohnert Park, CA	W 22–17	1,489	
October 19	at Cal State Hayward	Pioneer Stadium; Hayward, CA	W 22–13	428–900	
October 26	at Humboldt State	Redwood Bowl; Arcata, CA	W 35–0	2,025–2,125	
November 2	Chico State	Cossacks Stadium; Rohnert Park, CA	W 38–17	1,500–1,572	
November 9	at San Francisco State	Cox Stadium; San Francisco, CA	W 24–23	2,000	
November 16	UC Davis	Cossacks Stadium; Rohnert Park, CA	W 23–12	3,481	
*Non-conference game; Rankings from NCAA Division I-AA Football Committee Poll released prior to the game
