= 1989 Sacramento State Hornets football team =

American college football season

1989 Sacramento State Hornets football
- Conference: Western Football Conference
- Record: 5–4 (2–3 WFC)
- Head coach: Bob Mattos (12th season)
- Home stadium: Hornet Stadium

1989 Western Football Conference standings
	Conf.					Overall
Team	W		L		T	W		L		T
No. 14 Portland State $^	4	–	1	–	0	9	–	4	–	0
Cal State Northridge	4	–	2	–	0	6	–	5	–	0
Southern Utah State	4	–	2	–	0	5	–	5	–	0
Santa Clara	3	–	3	–	0	7	–	4	–	0
Sacramento State	2	–	3	–	0	5	–	4	–	0
Cal Poly	1	–	4	–	0	5	–	5	–	0
Cal Lutheran	0	–	3	–	0	3	–	6	–	0
$ – Conference champion; ^ – NCAA Division II playoff participant; Rankings from NCAA Division II Football Committee poll

The 1989 Sacramento State Hornets football team represented California State University, Sacramento as a member of the Western Football Conference (WFC) during the 1989 NCAA Division II football season. Led by 12th-year head coach Bob Mattos, Sacramento State compiled an overall record of 5–4 with a mark of 2–3 in conference play, placing fifth in the WFC. The team was outscored by its opponents 236 to 202 for the season. The Hornets played home games at Hornet Stadium in Sacramento, California.

== Schedule ==
Date	Opponent	Rank	Site	Result	Attendance	Source
September 2	at West Texas State*	No. 5	Kimbrough Memorial Stadium; Canyon, TX	W 35–22	5,306	
September 9	Chico State*	No. 5	Hornet Stadium; Sacramento, CA	W 48–28	5,800–6,000	
September 16	at Idaho*	No. 5	Kibbie Dome; Moscow, ID	L 3–45	9,100	
September 23	No. 17 UC Davis*		Charles C. Hughes Stadium; Sacramento, CA (Causeway Classic)	W 21–20	16,548	
September 30	Southern Utah State	No. 17	Hornet Stadium; Sacramento, CA	W 31–19	4,618	
October 14	at Santa Clara	No. 8	Buck Shaw Stadium; Santa Clara, CA	L 16–21	7,392	
October 21	Cal Poly		Hornet Stadium; Sacramento, CA	W 16–15	3,713	
October 28	at Portland State	No. T–20	Civic Stadium; Portland, OR	L 19–42	9,136	
November 4	Cal State Northridge		Hornet Stadium; Sacramento, CA	L 13–24	2,479	
*Non-conference game; Rankings from NCAA Division II Football Committee Poll released prior to the game
