= 1989 UC Davis Aggies football team =

American college football season

1989 UC Davis Aggies football

NCAC champion

NCAA Division II First Round, L 23–28 vs. Angelo State
- Conference: Northern California Athletic Conference
- Record: 8–3 (5–0 NCAC)
- Head coach: Bob Foster (1st season)
- Home stadium: Toomey Field

1989 Northern California Athletic Conference football standings
	Conf.					Overall
Team	W		L		T	W		L		T
No. 16 UC Davis $^	5	–	0	–	0	8	–	3	–	0
Chico State	4	–	1	–	0	6	–	4	–	0
Humboldt State	3	–	2	–	0	6	–	4	–	0
Sonoma State	2	–	3	–	0	4	–	6	–	0
Cal State Hayward	1	–	4	–	0	1	–	8	–	0
San Francisco State	0	–	5	–	0	3	–	7	–	0
$ – Conference champion; ^ – NCAA Division II playoff participant; Rankings from NCAA Division II Football Committee poll

The 1989 UC Davis football team represented the University of California, Davis as a member of the Northern California Athletic Conference (NCAC) during the 1989 NCAA Division II football season. Led by first-year head coach Bob Foster, the Aggies compiled an overall record of 8–3 with a mark of 5–0 in conference play, winning the NCAC title for the 19th consecutive season. UC Davis advanced to the NCAA Division II Football Championship playoffs, where they lost to Angelo State in the first round. 1989 was the 20th consecutive winning season for the Aggies and their 5–0 record in NCAC play extended the team's conference winning streak to 46 games dating back to the 1981 season. UC Davis outscored its opponents 303 to 202 for the season. The Aggies played home games at Toomey Field in Davis, California.

== Schedule ==
Date	Opponent	Rank	Site	Result	Attendance	Source
September 9	Santa Clara*	No. 15	Toomey Field; Davis, CA	W 28–27	7,654	
September 16	at Nevada*	No. 15	Mackay Stadium; Reno, NV	W 24–17	13,320	
September 23	at Sacramento State*	No. 17	Charles C. Hughes Stadium; Sacramento, CA (Causeway Classic)	L 20–21	16,548	
September 30	San Francisco State		Toomey Field; Davis, CA	W 35–14	6,230	
October 7	Cal State Hayward	No. 17	Toomey Field; Davis, CA	W 31–7	5,650	
October 14	at Sonoma State	No. 16	Cossacks Stadium (Note: Seawolf Stadium was known as Cossacks Stadium until 2002 when the University changed the mascot from Cossacks to Seawolves.); Rohnert Park, CA	W 28–19	1,872	
October 21	Cal State Northridge*	No. 12	Toomey Field; Davis, CA	W 24–7	7,151	
October 28	at Cal Poly*	No. 12	Mustang Stadium; San Luis Obispo, CA (rivalry)	L 21–28	5,745	
November 4	Humboldt State		Toomey Field; Davis, CA	W 35–13	6,765	
November 11	at Chico State	No. 16	University Stadium; Chico, CA	W 34–21	6,707–8,684	
November 18	No. T–5 Angelo State*	No. 16	Toomey Field; Davis, CA (NCAA Division II First Round)	L 23–28	6,200	
*Non-conference game; Rankings from NCAA Division II Football Committee Poll released prior to the game
