= 1989 Mississippi College Choctaws football team =

American college football season

1989 Mississippi College Choctaws football

NCAA Division II champion (vacated)

NCAA Division II Championship Game, W 3–0 vs. Jacksonville State
- Conference: Gulf South Conference
- Record: 11–3 (6–2 GSC)
- Head coach: John M. Williams (18th season)
- Home stadium: Robinson–Hale Stadium

1989 Gulf South Conference football standings
	Conf.					Overall
Team	W		L		T	W		L		T
No. 2 Jacksonville State $^	8	–	0	–	0	13	–	1	–	0
No. T–12 Mississippi College ^	6	–	2	–	0	11	–	3	–	0
Valdosta State	5	–	3	–	0	5	–	5	–	0
Delta State	4	–	3	–	1	6	–	3	–	1
North Alabama	4	–	4	–	0	6	–	5	–	0
Troy State	3	–	5	–	0	4	–	6	–	0
West Georgia	3	–	5	–	0	5	–	7	–	0
Livingston	1	–	6	–	1	0	–	3	–	7
Tennessee–Martin	1	–	7	–	0	0	–	2	–	9
$ – Conference champion; ^ – NCAA Division II playoff participant; Rankings from NCAA Division II Football Committee poll

The 1989 Mississippi College Choctaws football team was an American football team that represented Mississippi College in the Gulf South Conference (GSC) during the 1989 NCAA Division II football season. In their 18th season under head coach John M. Williams, the Choctaws compiled an 11–3 record (6–2 against conference opponents) and outscored opponents by a total of 376 to 160.

The team advanced to the NCAA Division II playoff, ultimately defeating Jacksonville State in the national championship game. It was the school's only national football championship. However, in January 1993, the NCAA vacated the national championship after concluding that the program had gained a "tremendous competitive advantage" based on multiple violations, including awarding twice as many scholarships as was allowed, providing extra benefits to student-athletes, and allowing 12 "partial qualifiers" to participate in practice sessions with the football team on a routine basis.

== Schedule ==
Date	Opponent	Rank	Site	Result	Attendance	Source
September 2	at McNeese State*	No. 7	Cowboy Stadium; Lake Charles, LA	L 21–28	15,233	
September 9	North Alabama	No. 7	Robinson-Hale Stadium; Clinton, MS	W 34–0	4,200	
September 16	at Southeast Missouri State*	No. 18	Houck Stadium; Cape Girardeau, MO	W 21–6	5,137	
September 23	at Tennessee–Martin	No. 13	Graham Stadium; Martin, TN	W 24–3	3,300	
September 30	No. 3 Jacksonville State	No. 8	Robinson–Hale Stadium; Clinton, MS	L 3–23	7,500	
October 7	at Troy State	No. 18	Veterans Memorial Stadium; Troy, AL	W 45–7	7,000	
October 14	Livingston	No. 15	Robinson–Hale Stadium; Clinton, MS	W 23–10	6,034	
October 21	at West Georgia	No. T–15	Grisham Stadium; Carrollton, GA	W 48–6	3,150	
October 28	Valdosta State	No. 13	Robinson–Hale Stadium; Clinton, MS	W 32–3	5,345	
November 11	at Delta State	No. T–12	McCool Stadium; Cleveland, MS	L 7–17	4,800	
November 18	at No. 1 Texas A&M–Kingsville*	No. T–12	Javelina Stadium; Kingsville, TX (NCAA Division II first round)	W 34–19		
November 25	at No. T–5 St. Cloud State*	No. T–12	Selke Field; St. Cloud, MN (NCAA Division II quarterfinal)	W 55–24		
December 2	No. 9 IUP*	No. T–12	Robinson–Hale Stadium; Clinton, MS (NCAA Division II semifinal)	W 26–14		
December 9	vs. No. 2 Jacksonville State	No. T–12	Braly Municipal Stadium; Florence, AL (NCAA Division II championship)	W 3–0	10,538	
*Non-conference game; Rankings from NCAA Division II Football Committee Poll released prior to the game
