= 1991 Jacksonville State Gamecocks football team =

American college football season

1991 Jacksonville State Gamecocks football

GSC champion

NCAA Division II Championship Game, L 6–23 vs. Pittsburg State
- Conference: Gulf South Conference
- Record: 12–1 (6–0 GSC)
- Head coach: Bill Burgess (7th season)
- Offensive coordinator: Charles Maniscalco (7th season)
- Defensive coordinator: Eddie Garfinkle (6th season)
- Home stadium: Paul Snow Stadium

1991 Gulf South Conference football standings
	Conf.					Overall
Team	W		L		T	W		L		T
No. 2 Jacksonville State $^	6	–	0	–	0	12	–	1	–	0
No. 11 Mississippi College ^	4	–	1	–	1	7	–	4	–	1
Valdosta State	4	–	1	–	1	6	–	3	–	1
Livingston	2	–	4	–	0	6	–	5	–	0
West Georgia	2	–	4	–	0	6	–	5	–	0
Delta State	1	–	5	–	0	3	–	7	–	0
North Alabama	1	–	5	–	0	3	–	7	–	0
$ – Conference champion; ^ – NCAA Division II playoff participant; Rankings from NCAA Division II Football Committee poll

The 1991 Jacksonville State Gamecocks football team represented Jacksonville State University as a member of the Gulf South Conference (GSC) during the 1991 NCAA Division II football season. Led by seventh-year head coach Bill Burgess, the Gamecocks compiled an overall record of 12–1 with a mark of 6–0 in conference play, winning the GSC title. For the fourth consecutive season, Jacksonville State advanced to the NCAA Division II Football Championship playoffs, beating Winston-Salem State in the first round, Mississippi College in the quarterfinals, and IUP in the semifinals before losing to Pittsburg State in the championship game.

== Schedule ==
Date	Time	Opponent	Rank	Site	Result	Attendance	Source
September 7	7:00 pm	Alabama A&M*	No. 5	Paul Snow Stadium; Jacksonville, AL	W 44–18	15,500	
September 21	2:00 pm	West Georgia	No. 5	Paul Snow Stadium; Jacksonville, AL	W 50–24	14,000	
September 28	12:00 pm	at Valdosta State	No. 3	Cleveland Field; Valdosta, GA	W 24–3	4,361	
October 5	7:00 pm	No. 2 Mississippi College	No. 3	Paul Snow Stadium; Jacksonville, AL	W 17–6	15,500	
October 12	6:00 pm	at Delta State	No. 2	Delta Field; Cleveland, MS	W 9–0	1,577	
October 19	2:00 pm	North Alabama	No. 2	Paul Snow Stadium; Jacksonville, AL	W 48–13	12,900	
November 2	3:00 pm	No. 6 Wofford*	No. 2	Paul Snow Stadium; Jacksonville, AL	W 51–7	13,500	
November 9	1:00 pm	at Livingston	No. 2	Tiger Stadium; Livingston, AL	W 31–0	3,000	
November 16	12:30 pm	at Kentucky State*	No. 2	Alumni Field; Frankfort, KY	W 42–7	1,500	
November 23	12:00 pm	at No. 12 Winston-Salem State*	No. 2	Bowman Gray Stadium; Winston-Salem, NC (NCAA Division II First Round)	W 49–24	7,908	
November 30	12:00 pm	No. 11 Mississippi College*	No. 2	Paul Snow Stadium; Jacksonville, AL (NCAA Division II Quarterfinal)	W 35–7	6,000	
December 7	12:00 pm	No. 1 IUP*	No. 2	Paul Snow Stadium; Jacksonville, AL (NCAA Division II Semifinal)	W 27–20	13,200	
December 14	1:00 pm	vs. No. 3 Pittsburg State*	No. 2	Braly Municipal Stadium; Florence, AL (NCAA Division II Championship Game)	L 6–23	11,682	
*Non-conference game; Rankings from NCAA Division II Football Committee Poll released prior to the game
