= 1991 Sacramento State Hornets football team =

American college football season

1991 Sacramento State Hornets football
- Conference: Western Football Conference
- Record: 8–2 (3–2 WFC)
- Head coach: Bob Mattos (14th season)
- Home stadium: Hornet Stadium

1991 Western Football Conference standings
	Conf.					Overall
Team	W		L		T	W		L		T
No. 8 Portland State $^	5	–	0	–	0	11	–	3	–	0
Southern Utah	4	–	1	–	0	7	–	3	–	1
Sacramento State	3	–	2	–	0	8	–	2	–	0
Cal Poly	2	–	3	–	0	4	–	6	–	0
Cal State Northridge	1	–	4	–	0	3	–	7	–	0
Santa Clara	0	–	5	–	0	5	–	6	–	0
$ – Conference champion; ^ – NCAA Division II playoff participant; Rankings from NCAA Division II Football Committee poll

The 1991 Sacramento State Hornets football team represented California State University, Sacramento as a member of the Western Football Conference (WFC) during the 1991 NCAA Division II football season. Led by 14th-year head coach Bob Mattos, Sacramento State compiled an overall record of 8–2 with a mark of 3–2 in conference play, placing third in the WFC. The team outscored its opponents 367 to 224 for the season. The Hornets played home games at Hornet Stadium in Sacramento, California.

== Schedule ==
Date	Opponent	Rank	Site	Result	Attendance	Source
August 31	at Pacific (CA)*		Stagg Memorial Stadium; Stockton, CA	W 43–40	17,500	
September 14	at Montana State*		Reno H. Sales Stadium; Bozeman, MT	W 19–17	5,437	
September 21	at Abilene Christian*	No. 14	Shotwell Stadium; Abilene, TX	W 45–7	1,250	
October 5	No. 16 UC Davis*	No. 10	Charles C. Hughes Stadium; Sacramento, CA (Causeway Classic)	W 50–18	18,500–19,000	
October 12	at Chico State*	No. 9	University Stadium; Chico, CA	W 63–21	6,248	
October 19	Cal Poly	No. 6	Hornet Stadium; Sacramento, CA	W 21–20	4,100	
October 26	Southern Utah	No. 6	Hornet Stadium; Sacramento, CA	L 19–22	1,746	
November 2	at No. 13 Portland State	No. 9	Civic Stadium; Portland, OR	L 19–35	11,589	
November 9	at Santa Clara	No. 19	Buck Shaw Stadium; Santa Clara, CA	W 33–32	1,200	
November 16	Cal State Northridge		Hornet Stadium; Sacramento, CA	W 55–12	2,230	
*Non-conference game; Rankings from NCAA Division II Football Committee Poll released prior to the game

== Team players in the NFL ==
No Sacramento State players were selected in the 1992 NFL draft.

The following finished their college career in 1991; they were not drafted, but played in the NFL.

Player	Position	First NFL team
Brian Allred	Defensive back	1993 Seattle Seahawks
