= 1991 East Texas State Lions football team =

American college football season

1991 East Texas State Lions football

NCAA Division II Quarterfinal, L 28–38 at Pittsburg State
- Conference: Lone Star Conference
- Record: 8–4–1 (4–1–1 LSC)
- Head coach: Eddie Vowell (6th season)
- Offensive coordinator: Ronnie Feldman
- Defensive coordinator: Mark Copeland
- Home stadium: Memorial Stadium

1991 Lone Star Conference football standings
	Conf.					Overall
Team	W		L		T	W		L		T
Eastern New Mexico $	5	–	1	–	0	7	–	3	–	1
No. 19 East Texas State ^	4	–	1	–	1	8	–	4	–	1
Angelo State	4	–	1	–	1	6	–	3	–	1
Texas A&I	4	–	2	–	0	7	–	3	–	0
Cameron	1	–	5	–	0	3	–	7	–	0
Central Oklahoma	1	–	5	–	0	3	–	7	–	0
Abilene Christian	1	–	5	–	0	1	–	10	–	0
$ – Conference champion; ^ – NCAA Division II playoff participant; Rankings from NCAA Division II Football Committee poll

The 1991 East Texas State Lions football team represented East Texas State University—now known as Texas A&M University–Commerce—as a member of the Lone Star Conference (LSC) during the 1991 NCAA Division II football season. Led by sixth-year head coach Eddie Vowell, the Lions compiled an overall record of 8–4–1 with a mark of 4–1–1 in conference play, tying for second place in the LSC. They advanced to the NCAA Division II Football Championship playoffs, where they beat Grand Valley State in the first round before falling to eventual national champion Pittsburg State in the quarterfinals. East Texas State played their home games at Memorial Stadium in Commerce, Texas.

== Schedule ==
Date	Opponent	Rank	Site	Result	Attendance	Source
September 7	at Livingston*	No. 7	Tiger Stadium; Livingston, AL	W 44–6	3,000	
September 14	No. 2 Pittsburg State*	No. 7	Memorial Stadium; Commerce, TX	W 20–13	8,600	
September 21	at Southern Arkansas*	No. 4	Wilkins Stadium; Magnolia, AR	L 6–14	5,000	
September 28	at Northwestern State*	No. 12	Harry Turpin Stadium; Natchitoches, LA	L 23–26	11,400	
October 5	Central Oklahoma		Memorial Stadium; Commerce, TX	W 51–21	5,200	
October 12	at No. 12 Texas A&I		Javelina Stadium; Kingsville, TX	W 24–22	11,500	
October 19	Wayne State (NE)*	No. 14	Memorial Stadium; Commerce, TX	W 54–16	2,500	
October 26	at Eastern New Mexico	No. 11	Greyhound Stadium; Portales, NM	L 14–17	2,500	
November 2	Abilene Christian		Memorial Stadium; Commerce, TX	W 37–3	2,500	
November 9	at Angelo State		San Angelo Stadium; San Angelo, TX	T 39–39	3,200	
November 16	Cameron	No. 19	Memorial Stadium; Commerce, TX	W 39–7	300	
November 23	No. 9 Grand Valley State*	No. 19	Memorial Stadium; Commerce, TX (NCAA Division II First Round)	W 36–15	3,000	
November 30	at No. 3 Pittsburg State*	No. 19	Carnie Smith Stadium (NCAA Division II Quarterfinal)	L 28–38		
*Non-conference game; Rankings from NCAA Division II Football Committee Poll released prior to the game

== Awards ==
=== All-Americans ===
- Dwayne Phorne, Offensive Line, First Team
- Eric Turner, Defensive Back, First Team
- Micah Haley, Defensive Line, Second Team
- Billy Watkins, Placekicker, Second Team
- Jim White, Center, Second Team
- Bobby Bounds, Quarterback, Honorable Mention
- Curtis Buckley, Safety, Honorable Mention

== All-Lone Star Conference ==
=== LSC Superlatives ===
- Offensive Back of the Year: Bobby Bounds
- Defensive Back of the Year: Eric Turner

=== LSC First Team ===
- Bobby Bounds, Quarterback
- Joe Brookins, Defensive Back
- Curtis Buckley, Strong Safety
- Micah Haley, Defensive Line
- Brian Harp, Wide Receiver
- Dwayne Phorne, Offensive Tackle
- Eddie Tenison, Wide Receiver
- Eric Turner, Cornerback
- Billy Watkins, Kicker
- Jim White, Center

=== LSC Second Team ===
- David Chapman, Fullback
- David Gaskamp, Offensive Guard
- Finis Turner, Safety

=== LSC Honorable Mention ===
- Earl Bell, Offensive Tackle
- Duane Hicks, Defensive Tackle
- Jimmy Hooker, Strong Safety
- Mike Meador, Quarterback
- Billy Minor, Wide Receiver
- Kevin Oblander, Defensive Line
- Gary Perry, Running Back
- Aaron Postert, Tight End
- Joseph Showell, Offensive Tackle
- Terrance Toliver, Linebacker
