= 1991 UC Davis Aggies football team =

American college football season

1991 UC Davis Aggies football
- Conference: Northern California Athletic Conference
- Record: 7–3 (3–2 NCAC)
- Head coach: Bob Foster (3rd season)
- Home stadium: Toomey Field

1991 Northern California Athletic Conference football standings
	Conf.					Overall
Team	W		L		T	W		L		T
Sonoma State $	5	–	0	–	0	9	–	2	–	0
UC Davis	3	–	2	–	0	7	–	3	–	0
Humboldt State	2	–	3	–	0	6	–	5	–	0
Chico State	2	–	3	–	0	4	–	6	–	0
San Francisco State	2	–	3	–	0	3	–	7	–	0
Cal State Hayward	1	–	4	–	0	3	–	7	–	0
$ – Conference champion

The 1991 UC Davis football team represented the University of California, Davis as a member of the Northern California Athletic Conference (NCAC) during the 1991 NCAA Division II football season. Led by third-year head coach Bob Foster, the Aggies compiled an overall record of 7–3 with a mark of 3–2 in conference play, placing second in the NCAC. 1991 was the 22nd consecutive winning season for the Aggies, but the first time in 21 years the Aggies did not the conference championship. They had won or shared the championship every year from 1971 to 1990. UC Davis' loss to Chico State on October 29 broke a streak of 52 consecutive conference wins that started in the 1981 season. And it ended a remarkable string of 90 conference wins in 91 games stretching back to the 1981 season. UC Davis outscored its opponents 238 to 215 for the season. The Aggies played home games at Toomey Field in Davis, California.

== Schedule ==
Date	Opponent	Rank	Site	Result	Attendance	Source
September 14	at No. 17 Cal Poly*		Mustang Stadium; San Luis Obispo, CA (rivalry)	W 31–28	3,263	
September 21	Santa Clara*	No. 20	Toomey Field; Davis, CA	W 31–21	6,300	
September 28	at Saint Mary's*	No. 18	Saint Mary's Stadium; Moraga, CA	W 13–12	2,900	
October 5	at No. 10 Sacramento State*	No. 16	Charles C. Hughes Stadium; Sacramento, CA (Causeway Classic)	L 18–50	18,500–19,000	
October 12	Cal State Northridge*		Toomey Field; Davis, CA	W 29–17	4,200	
October 19	Humboldt State		Toomey Field; Davis, CA	W 44–6	5,400	
October 26	at Chico State		University Stadium; Chico, CA	L 20–24	3,012	
November 2	San Francisco State		Toomey Field; Davis, CA	W 34–21	4,400	
November 9	Cal State Hayward		Toomey Field; Davis, CA	W 16–13	3,800–4,200	
November 16	at Sonoma State		Seawolf Stadium; Rohnert Park, CA	L 12–23	3,481	
*Non-conference game; Rankings from NCAA Division II Football Committee Poll released prior to the game
