= 1989 UC Santa Barbara Gauchos football team =

American college football season

1989 UC Santa Barbara Gauchos football
- Conference: Independent
- Record: 8–2
- Head coach: Mike Warren (4th season)
- Home stadium: Harder Stadium

1989 NCAA Division III independents football records
	Conf.			Overall
Team	W	L	T	W		L		T
Dayton ^		–		13	–	0	–	1
Union (NY) ^		–		13	–	1	–	0
Frostburg State		–		9	–	1	–	0
Aurora		–		8	–	1	–	0
Ferrum ^		–		11	–	2	–	0
Cortland ^		–		9	–	2	–	0
Catholic University		–		8	–	2	–	0
UC Santa Barbara		–		8	–	2	–	0
San Diego		–		7	–	2	–	0
Quincy		–		7	–	2	–	1
Hofstra ^		–		8	–	3	–	0
Drake		–		7	–	3	–	0
Wagner		–		6	–	3	–	0
Duquesne		–		6	–	4	–	0
Albany		–		5	–	4	–	0
Canisius		–		5	–	4	–	0
Mercyhurst		–		5	–	4	–	0
Fairleigh Dickinson–Florham		–		4	–	4	–	1
Wesley		–		4	–	5	–	0
Buffalo		–		4	–	6	–	0
Maryville (TN)		–		4	–	6	–	0
Menlo		–		3	–	6	–	0
Brockport		–		3	–	7	–	0
Salisbury State		–		2	–	6	–	1
Norwich		–		2	–	7	–	1
Davidson		–		2	–	8	–	0
Georgetown		–		2	–	8	–	0
Western Connecticut State		–		2	–	8	–	0
Buffalo State		–		1	–	8	–	0
Colorado College		–		1	–	8	–	0
Gannon		–		0	–	7	–	0
Saint Peter's		–		0	–	7	–	0
Methodist		–		0	–	10	–	0
^ – NCAA Division III playoff participant

The 1989 UC Santa Barbara Gauchos football team represented the University of California, Santa Barbara (UCSB) as an independent during the 1989 NCAA Division III football season. Led by Mike Warren in his fourth and final season as head coach, the Gauchos compiled a record of 8–2 and outscored their opponents 313 to 150 for the season. The team played home games at Harder Stadium in Santa Barbara, California.

Warren was finished his four-year stint as head coach with a record of 26–13 for a winning percentage of .667.

== Schedule ==
Date	Opponent	Site	Result	Attendance	Source
September 9	Humboldt State	Harder Stadium; Santa Barbara, CA	W 24–17	1,227	
September 16	at Chico State	University Stadium; Chico, CA	L 22–27	1,000–1,131	
September 23	at San Francisco State	Cox Stadium; San Francisco, CA	L 14–32	500	
September 30	Cal Lutheran	Harder Stadium; Santa Barbara, CA	W 24–21	1,814	
October 7	at Sonoma State	Cossacks Stadium (Note: Seawolf Stadium was known as Cossacks Stadium until 2002 when the University changed the mascot from Cossacks to Seawolves.); Rohnert Park, CA	W 24–3	793	
October 14	at Saint Mary's	Saint Mary's Stadium; Moraga, CA	W 27–21	3,050	
October 21	Cal State Hayward	Harder Stadium; Santa Barbara, CA	W 30–12	150–700	
October 28	San Diego	Harder Stadium; Santa Barbara, CA	W 51–3	1,200	
November 4	Menlo	Harder Stadium; Santa Barbara, CA	W 59–0	1,012	
November 11	Azusa Pacific	Harder Stadium; Santa Barbara, CA	W 38–14	6,174	
