= 1991 Humboldt State Lumberjacks football team =

American college football season

1991 Humboldt State Lumberjacks football
- Conference: Northern California Athletic Conference
- Record: 6–5 (2–3 NCAC)
- Head coach: Fred Whitmire (1st season)
- Home stadium: Redwood Bowl

1991 Northern California Athletic Conference football standings
| | Conf. | | | | | Overall |
| Team | W | | L | | T | W | | L | | T |
|---|---|---|---|---|---|---|---|---|---|---|
| Sonoma State $ | 5 | – | 0 | – | 0 | 9 | – | 2 | – | 0 |
| UC Davis | 3 | – | 2 | – | 0 | 7 | – | 3 | – | 0 |
| Humboldt State | 2 | – | 3 | – | 0 | 6 | – | 5 | – | 0 |
| Chico State | 2 | – | 3 | – | 0 | 4 | – | 6 | – | 0 |
| San Francisco State | 2 | – | 3 | – | 0 | 3 | – | 7 | – | 0 |
| Cal State Hayward | 1 | – | 4 | – | 0 | 3 | – | 7 | – | 0 |
$ – Conference champion

The 1991 Humboldt State Lumberjacks football team represented Humboldt State University—now known as California State Polytechnic University, Humboldt—as a member of the Northern California Athletic Conference (NCAC) during the 1991 NCAA Division II football season. Led by first-year head coach Fred Whitmire, the Lumberjacks compiled an overall record of 6–5 with a mark of 2–3 in conference play, placing in a three-way tie for third in the NCAC. The team was outscored by its opponents 247 to 223 for the season. Humboldt State played home games at the Redwood Bowl in Arcata, California.

== Schedule ==
| Date | Opponent | Site | Result | Attendance | Source |
|---|---|---|---|---|---|
| August 31 | Rocky Mountain* | Redwood Bowl; Arcata, CA | W 22–12 | 3,100 | |
| September 7 | at Montana* | Washington–Grizzly Stadium; Missoula, MT | L 6–38 | 10,299 | |
| September 14 | Saint Mary's* | Redwood Bowl; Arcata, CA | W 17–14 | 2,350 | |
| September 21 | Azusa Pacific* | Redwood Bowl; Arcata, CA | W 35–0 | 3,450 | |
| October 5 | at Santa Clara* | Buck Shaw Stadium; Santa Clara, CA | L 23–28 | 4,400 | |
| October 12 | UBC* | Redwood Bowl; Arcata, CA | W 35–30 | 2,855 | |
| October 19 | at UC Davis | Toomey Field; Davis, CA | L 6–44 | 5,400 | |
| October 26 | Sonoma State | Redwood Bowl; Arcata, CA | L 0–35 | 2,025–2,125 | |
| November 2 | at Cal State Hayward | Pioneer Stadium; Hayward, CA | L 6–16 | 800 | |
| November 9 | at Chico State | University Stadium; Chico, CA | W 29–17 | 1,724 | |
| November 16 | San Francisco State | Redwood Bowl; Arcata, CA | W 44–13 | 1,310 | |
*Non-conference game

== Team players in the NFL ==
The following Humboldt State player was selected in the 1992 NFL draft.

| Round | Pick | Player | Position | NFL team |
|---|---|---|---|---|
| 12 | 333 | Freeman Baysinger | Wide receiver | New England Patriots |
