= 1991 San Francisco State Gators football team =

American college football season

1991 San Francisco State Gators football
- Conference: Northern California Athletic Conference
- Record: 3–7 (2–3 NCAC)
- Head coach: Harold Hamilton (1st season)
- Home stadium: Cox Stadium

1991 Northern California Athletic Conference football standings
	Conf.					Overall
Team	W		L		T	W		L		T
Sonoma State $	5	–	0	–	0	9	–	2	–	0
UC Davis	3	–	2	–	0	7	–	3	–	0
Humboldt State	2	–	3	–	0	6	–	5	–	0
Chico State	2	–	3	–	0	4	–	6	–	0
San Francisco State	2	–	3	–	0	3	–	7	–	0
Cal State Hayward	1	–	4	–	0	3	–	7	–	0
$ – Conference champion

The 1991 San Francisco State Gators football team represented San Francisco State University as a member of the Northern California Athletic Conference (NCAC) during the 1991 NCAA Division II football season. Led by Harold Hamilton in his first and only season head coach, San Francisco State compiled an overall record of 3–7 with a mark of 2–3 in conference play, placing in a three-way tie for third place in the NCAC. For the season the team was outscored by its opponents 288 to 257. The Gators played home games at Cox Stadium in San Francisco.

== Schedule ==
Date	Opponent	Site	Result	Attendance	Source
September 7	Saint Mary's*	Cox Stadium; San Francisco, CA	L 13–51	2,000	
September 14	Santa Clara*	Cox Stadium; San Francisco, CA	L 16–31	2,000	
September 28	Southern Utah*	Cox Stadium; San Francisco, CA	L 23–42	1,200	
October 5	UC Santa Barbara*	Cox Stadium; San Francisco, CA	L 27–31	1,200	
October 12	at Menlo*	Atherton, CA	W 55–7	500	
October 19	at Chico State	University Stadium; Chico, CA	W 34–17	2,267	
October 26	Cal State Hayward	Cox Stadium; San Francisco, CA	W 32–17	350–1,500	
November 2	at UC Davis	Toomey Field; Davis, CA	L 21–24	4,400	
November 9	Sonoma State	Cox Stadium; San Francisco, CA	L 23–24	2,000	
November 16	at Humboldt State	Redwood Bowl; Arcata, CA	L 13–44	1,310	
*Non-conference game
