= 1991 NCAA Division II football rankings =

The 1991 NCAA Division II football rankings are from the NCAA Division II football committee. This is for the 1991 season.

== Legend ==
	Increase in ranking
	Decrease in ranking
	Not ranked previous week
(#–#)	Win–loss record
(Italics)	Number of first place votes
т	Tied with team above or below also with this symbol

== NCAA Division II Football Committee poll ==
	Preseason	Week 1 Sept 17	Week 2 Sept 24	Week 3 Oct 1	Week 4 Oct 8	Week 5 Oct 15	Week 6 Oct 22	Week 7 Oct 29	Week 8 Nov 5	Week 9 Nov 12	
1.	North Dakota State (4)	IUP (2–0) (4)	IUP (3–0) (4)	IUP (4–0) (4)	IUP (5–0) (4)	IUP (6–0) (4)	IUP (7–0) (4)	IUP (8–0) (4)	IUP (9–0) (4)	IUP (10–0)	1.
2.	Pittsburg State	Mississippi College (2–0)	Mississippi College (3–0)	Mississippi College (3–1)	Jacksonville State (4–0)	Jacksonville State (5–0)	Jacksonville State (6–0)	Jacksonville State (6–0)	Jacksonville State (7–0)	Jacksonville State (8–0)	2.
3.	IUP (Note: In the actual printed polls, IUP was listed as Indiana, Pa.)	Grand Valley State (2–0)	Jacksonville State (2–0)	Jacksonville State (3–0)	Northern Colorado (5–0)	Northern Colorado (6–0)	Ashland (7–0)	Mississippi College (5–2)	Pittsburg State (7–1–1)	Pittsburg State (8–1–1)	3.
4.	Mississippi College	East Texas State (2–0)	Northern Colorado (3–0)	Northern Colorado (4–0)	Virginia Union (5–0)	Ashland (6–0)	Butler (6–0)	Northern Colorado (7–1)	Northern Colorado (7–1)	Northern Colorado (8–1)	4.
5.	Jacksonville State	Jacksonville State (1–0)	Virginia Union (3–0)	Virginia Union (4–0)	Wofford (5–0)	Butler (5–0)	North Dakota State (5–1)	Ashland (7–1)	Virginia Union (7–1–1)	Butler (8–1)	5.
6.	Grand Valley State	Mankato State (2–0)	Wofford (3–0)	Wofford (4–0)	Ashland (5–0)	Sacramento State (5–0) т	Sacramento State (6–0)	Wofford (7–1)	Butler (7–1)	Texas A&I (7–2)	6.
7.	East Texas State	Pittsburg State (1–1)	Ashland (3–0)	Ashland (4–0)	Butler (4–0)	North Dakota State (4–1) т	Winston–Salem State (7–0)	Pittsburg State (6–1–1)	Texas A&I (6–2)	North Dakota State (6–2)	7.
8.	Northern Colorado	Northern Colorado (2–0)	Butler (3–0)	Butler (3–0)	North Dakota State (3–1)	Winston–Salem State (6–0)	Mississippi College (4–2)	Virginia Union (6–1–1)	Mississippi College (5–2–1)	Portland State (8–2)	8.
9.	North Alabama	Virginia Union (2–0)	North Dakota State (1–1)	North Dakota State (2–1)	Sacramento State (4–0)	Edinboro (5–1)	North Dakota (6–0)	Sacramento State (6–1)	North Dakota State (5–2)	Grand Valley State (8–2)	9.
10.	Edinboro	Wofford (2–0)	Sacramento State (3–0)	Sacramento State (3–0)	Mississippi College (3–2)	Mississippi College (3–2)	Pittsburg State (5–1–1)	Butler (6–1)	Portland State (7–2)	Virginia Union (8–2)	10.
11.	Portland State	Norfolk State (3–0)	Winston–Salem State (3–0)	Winston–Salem State (4–0)	Winston–Salem State (5–0)	North Dakota (5–0)	East Texas State (5–2)	North Dakota State (5–2)	Grand Valley State (6–2)	Mississippi College (5–3–1)	11.
12.	Northeast Missouri State	North Dakota State (0–1)	East Texas State (2–1)	Millersville (3–0)	Texas A&I (4–1)	Pittsburg State (4–1–1)	Northern Colorado (6–1)	Grand Valley State (6–2)	East Stroudsburg (7–1–1)	Winston–Salem State (9–1)	12.
13.	Wofford	Ashland (2–0)	Pittsburg State (2–1)	Texas A&I (3–1)	Shippensburg (5–0)	West Chester (5–1)	Missouri Southern (6–1)	Portland State (6–2)	Winston–Salem State (8–1)	Mankato State (6–3)	13.
14.	Texas A&I	Sacramento State (2–0)	Millersville (2–0)	Mankato State (3–1)	Edinboro (4–1)	East Texas State (4–2)	Wofford (6–1)	East Stroudsburg (6–1–1)	Elizabeth City State (7–1) (Note: In the actual printed polls, Elizabeth City State was listed as Elizabeth City)	Shippensburg (8–2)	14.
15.	Virginia Union	Angelo State (2–0)	Mankato State (2–1)	Shippensburg (4–0)	North Dakota (4–0)	Missouri Southern (5–1)	Savannah State (5–2)	Fort Valley State (5–2)	Mankato State (5–3)	Ashland (8–2)	15.
16.	Mankato State	Shippensburg (2–0)	Shippensburg (3–0)	UC Davis (3–0)	St. Cloud State (3–1)	Wofford (5–1)	Texas A&I (5–2)	Texas A&I (5–2)	Ashland (7–2)	Morehouse (6–3)	16.
17.	Cal Poly (Note: In the actual printed polls, Cal Poly was listed as Cal Poly, San Luis Obispo)	Winston–Salem State (2–0) (Note: In the actual printed polls, Winston–Salem State was listed as Winston–Salem)	Texas A&I (2–1)	Northwest Missouri State (3–1)	Pittsburg State (3–1–1)	Savannah State (4–2)	Shippensburg (6–1)	Winston–Salem State (7–1)	Morehouse (6–3)	North Dakota (7–1)	17.
18.	Angelo State	Millersville (1–0)	UC Davis (2–0)	Grand Valley State (3–1)	West Chester (4–1)	Texas A&I (4–2)	Virginia Union (6–1)	Mankato State (5–3)	Shippensburg (7–2)	East Stroudsburg (7–2–1)	18.
19.	Millersville т	Butler (2–0)	Grand Valley State (2–1) т	Edinboro (3–1)	Savannah State (4–2) т	Shippensburg (5–1)	East Stroudsburg (5–1–1)	Shippensburg (6–2)	Sacramento State (6–2) т	East Texas State (6–3–1)	19.
20.	Tuskegee т	UC Davis (1–0)	Angelo State (2–1) т	Fort Valley State (3–1)	Missouri Southern (4–1) т	Virginia Union (5–1)	Portland State (5–2)	Edinboro (5–2)	North Dakota (6–1) т	Wofford (8–2)	20.
21.									Wofford (7–2) т		21.
	Preseason	Week 1 Sept 17	Week 2 Sept 24	Week 3 Oct 1	Week 4 Oct 8	Week 5 Oct 15	Week 6 Oct 22	Week 7 Oct 29	Week 8 Nov 5	Week 9 Nov 12	
		Dropped: 9 North Alabama; 10 Edinboro; 11 Portland State; 12 Northeast Missouri State; 14 Texas A&I; 17 Cal Poly; 20 Tuskegee	Dropped: 11 Norfolk State	Dropped: 12 East Texas State; 13 Pittsburg State; 20 Angelo State	Dropped: 12 Millersville; 14 Mankato State; 16 UC Davis; 17 Northwest Missouri State; 18 Grand Valley State; 20 Fort Valley State	Dropped: 16 St. Cloud State	Dropped: 9 Edinboro; 13 West Chester	Dropped: 9 North Dakota; 11 East Texas State; 13 Missouri Southern; 15 Savannah State	Dropped: 15 Fort Valley State; 20 Edinboro	Dropped: 14 Elizabeth City State; 19 Sacramento State	
