= 1991 NCAA Division II football season =

American college football season

- Regular season: August – November 1991
- Playoffs: November 23 – December 14, 1991
- National Championship: Braly Municipal Stadium; Florence, AL
- Champion: Pittsburg State
- Harlon Hill Trophy: Ronnie West, Pittsburg State

The 1991 NCAA Division II football season, part of college football in the United States organized by the National Collegiate Athletic Association at the Division II level, began in August 1991, and concluded with the NCAA Division II Football Championship on December 14, 1991, at Braly Municipal Stadium in Florence, Alabama, hosted by the University of North Alabama. The Pittsburg State Gorillas defeated the Jacksonville State Gamecocks, 23–6, to win their first Division II national title.

The Harlon Hill Trophy was awarded to Ronnie West, wide receiver from Pittsburg State.

== Conference and program changes ==
=== Conference changes ===
- One program departed Division II for Division I-AA prior to the season.

School	1990 Conference	1991 Conference
Cal Lutheran	D-II Independent	SCIAC (D-III)
Emporia State	NAIA Independent	MIAA
Southeast Missouri State	MIAA (D-II)	Ohio Valley (I-AA)
Tennessee–Martin	Gulf South	Independent
Troy State	Gulf South	Independent
UC Santa Barbara	D-III Independent	D-II Independent
West Texas State	Lone Star	Dropped program
Lees–McRae	Junior college	Independent

=== Program changes ===
- After Central State University (Oklahoma) changed its name to the University of Central Oklahoma in 1991, the Central State Bronchos became the Central Oklahoma Bronchos.
- Kearney State College changed its name to the University of Nebraska at Kearney this year. The Kearney State Lopers became the Nebraska-Kearney Lopers.

== Conference standings ==
1991 Central Intercollegiate Athletic Association football standings
	Conf.					Overall
Team	W		L		T	W		L		T
No. 12 Winston-Salem State $^	6	–	0	–	0	9	–	2	–	0
Elizabeth City State	6	–	1	–	0	7	–	2	–	0
Norfolk State	6	–	1	–	0	7	–	3	–	0
No. 10 Virginia Union ^	5	–	1	–	0	8	–	3	–	0
Livingstone	3	–	3	–	0	5	–	5	–	0
North Carolina Central	3	–	4	–	0	4	–	6	–	0
Johnson C. Smith	2	–	4	–	0	2	–	7	–	1
Bowie State	2	–	5	–	0	4	–	5	–	0
Hampton	2	–	6	–	0	2	–	9	–	0
Virginia State	1	–	5	–	0	3	–	7	–	0
Fayetteville State	0	–	6	–	0	1	–	9	–	0
$ – Conference champion; ^ – NCAA Division II playoff participant; Rankings from NCAA Division II Football Committee poll

1991 Gulf South Conference football standings
	Conf.					Overall
Team	W		L		T	W		L		T
No. 2 Jacksonville State $^	6	–	0	–	0	12	–	1	–	0
No. 11 Mississippi College ^	4	–	1	–	1	7	–	4	–	1
Valdosta State	4	–	1	–	1	6	–	3	–	1
Livingston	2	–	4	–	0	6	–	5	–	0
West Georgia	2	–	4	–	0	6	–	5	–	0
Delta State	1	–	5	–	0	3	–	7	–	0
North Alabama	1	–	5	–	0	3	–	7	–	0
$ – Conference champion; ^ – NCAA Division II playoff participant; Rankings from NCAA Division II Football Committee poll

1991 Lone Star Conference football standings
	Conf.					Overall
Team	W		L		T	W		L		T
Eastern New Mexico $	5	–	1	–	0	7	–	3	–	1
No. 19 East Texas State ^	4	–	1	–	1	8	–	4	–	1
Angelo State	4	–	1	–	1	6	–	3	–	1
Texas A&I	4	–	2	–	0	7	–	3	–	0
Cameron	1	–	5	–	0	3	–	7	–	0
Central Oklahoma	1	–	5	–	0	3	–	7	–	0
Abilene Christian	1	–	5	–	0	1	–	10	–	0
$ – Conference champion; ^ – NCAA Division II playoff participant; Rankings from NCAA Division II Football Committee poll

1991 Midwest Intercollegiate Football Conference standings
	Conf.					Overall
Team	W		L		T	W		L		T
No. 5 Butler $^	9	–	1	–	0	9	–	2	–	0
No. 15 Ashland	8	–	2	–	0	9	–	2	–	0
No. 9 Grand Valley State ^	8	–	2	–	0	9	–	3	–	0
Saginaw Valley State	5	–	5	–	0	6	–	5	–	0
Ferris State	5	–	5	–	0	5	–	6	–	0
Hillsdale	5	–	5	–	0	5	–	6	–	0
Wayne State (MI)	4	–	6	–	0	4	–	6	–	0
Saint Joseph's (IN)	4	–	6	–	0	4	–	6	–	0
Northern Michigan	3	–	6	–	1	3	–	6	–	1
Indianapolis	2	–	8	–	0	2	–	8	–	0
Valparaiso	1	–	8	–	1	1	–	8	–	1
$ – Conference champion; ^ – NCAA Division II playoff participant; Rankings from NCAA Division II Football Committee poll

1991 Missouri Intercollegiate Athletic Association football standings
	Conf.					Overall
Team	W		L		T	W		L		T
No. 3 Pittsburg State $^	8	–	0	–	1	13	–	1	–	1
Missouri Southern	7	–	2	–	0	8	–	3	–	0
Southwest Baptist	5	–	4	–	0	7	–	4	–	0
Central Missouri State	5	–	4	–	0	5	–	6	–	0
NE Missouri State	5	–	4	–	0	5	–	6	–	0
Emporia State	4	–	5	–	0	5	–	5	–	0
NW Missouri State	4	–	5	–	0	5	–	6	–	0
Missouri–Rolla	3	–	5	–	1	4	–	6	–	1
Missouri Western	2	–	7	–	0	4	–	7	–	0
Washburn	1	–	8	–	0	1	–	10	–	0
$ – Conference champion; ^ – NCAA Division II playoff participant; Rankings from NCAA Division II Football Committee poll

1991 North Central Conference football standings
	Conf.					Overall
Team	W		L		T	W		L		T
No. 7 North Dakota State $^	7	–	1	–	0	7	–	3	–	0
No. 4 Northern Colorado ^	6	–	2	–	0	8	–	3	–	0
No. 17 North Dakota	6	–	2	–	0	7	–	2	–	0
South Dakota State	5	–	3	–	0	7	–	3	–	0
No. 13 Mankato State ^	5	–	3	–	0	8	–	4	–	0
St. Cloud State	5	–	3	–	0	6	–	3	–	0
Nebraska–Omaha	4	–	4	–	0	6	–	4	–	0
Morningside	1	–	7	–	0	2	–	8	–	0
South Dakota	1	–	7	–	0	1	–	8	–	0
Augustana (SD)	0	–	8	–	0	0	–	10	–	0
$ – Conference champion; ^ – NCAA Division II playoff participant; Rankings from NCAA Division II Football Committee poll

1991 Northern California Athletic Conference football standings
	Conf.					Overall
Team	W		L		T	W		L		T
Sonoma State $	5	–	0	–	0	9	–	2	–	0
UC Davis	3	–	2	–	0	7	–	3	–	0
Humboldt State	2	–	3	–	0	6	–	5	–	0
Chico State	2	–	3	–	0	4	–	6	–	0
San Francisco State	2	–	3	–	0	3	–	7	–	0
Cal State Hayward	1	–	4	–	0	3	–	7	–	0
$ – Conference champion

1991 Northern Intercollegiate Conference football standings
	Conf.					Overall
Team	W		L		T	W		L		T
No. 4 Moorhead State $^	5	–	0	–	0	10	–	2	–	0
No. 9 Southwest State (MN)	5	–	1	–	0	9	–	1	–	0
Minnesota Duluth	4	–	1	–	0	6	–	4	–	0
Northern State	3	–	3	–	0	6	–	5	–	0
Bemidji State	1	–	4	–	0	2	–	7	–	0
Minnesota Morris	1	–	5	–	0	2	–	9	–	0
Winona State	0	–	5	–	0	1	–	9	–	0
$ – Conference champion; ^ – NAIA Division I playoff participant; Rankings from NAIA Division I poll

1991 Pennsylvania State Athletic Conference football standings
	Conf.					Overall
Team	W		L		T	W		L		T
East Division
No. 18 East Stroudsburg x^	5	–	0	–	1	8	–	3	–	1
Kutztown	4	–	2	–	0	6	–	4	–	0
Bloomsburg	4	–	2	–	0	6	–	5	–	0
West Chester	3	–	3	–	0	6	–	5	–	0
Millersville	2	–	3	–	1	4	–	5	–	1
Mansfield	2	–	4	–	0	5	–	5	–	1
Cheyney	0	–	6	–	0	0	–	11	–	0
West Division
No. 1 IUP x^	6	–	0	–	0	12	–	1	–	0
No. 14 Shippensburg ^	4	–	2	–	0	10	–	3	–	0
Slippery Rock	4	–	2	–	0	6	–	4	–	0
Edinboro	3	–	3	–	0	7	–	4	–	0
Clarion	2	–	4	–	0	5	–	5	–	0
Lock Haven	2	–	4	–	0	4	–	7	–	0
California (PA)	0	–	6	–	0	1	–	9	–	0
x – Division champion/co-champions; ^ – NCAA Division II playoff participant; Rankings from NCAA Division II Football Committee poll

1991 Southern Intercollegiate Athletic Conference football standings
	Conf.					Overall
Team	W		L		T	W		L		T
Fort Valley State +	5	–	2	–	0	7	–	3	–	0
Clark Atlanta +	5	–	2	–	0	6	–	3	–	1
Morehouse +	5	–	2	–	0	6	–	4	–	0
Tuskegee +	5	–	2	–	0	6	–	4	–	0
Alabama A&M +	5	–	2	–	0	5	–	6	–	0
Savannah State	4	–	3	–	0	7	–	4	–	0
Morris Brown	2	–	5	–	0	4	–	6	–	0
Albany State	2	–	6	–	0	3	–	7	–	0
Miles	0	–	8	–	0	1	–	10	–	0
+ – Conference co-champions

1991 West Virginia Intercollegiate Athletic Conference football standings
	Conf.					Overall
Team	W		L		T	W		L		T
No. 6 Shepherd $^	7	–	0	–	0	8	–	3	–	0
No. 10 Concord	6	–	1	–	0	8	–	2	–	0
No. 19 West Virginia State	4	–	3	–	0	6	–	4	–	0
West Liberty State	3	–	3	–	1	4	–	5	–	1
Glenville State	3	–	4	–	0	4	–	5	–	1
West Virginia Wesleyan	3	–	4	–	0	4	–	5	–	0
Fairmont State	1	–	5	–	1	1	–	8	–	1
West Virginia Tech	0	–	7	–	0	0	–	10	–	0
$ – Conference champion; ^ – NAIA Division I playoff participant West Virginia Tech forfeited four victories, including two conference wins, over Fairmont State and West Virginia Wesleyan.; Rankings from NAIA Division I poll

1991 Western Football Conference standings
	Conf.					Overall
Team	W		L		T	W		L		T
No. 8 Portland State $^	5	–	0	–	0	11	–	3	–	0
Southern Utah	4	–	1	–	0	7	–	3	–	1
Sacramento State	3	–	2	–	0	8	–	2	–	0
Cal Poly	2	–	3	–	0	4	–	6	–	0
Cal State Northridge	1	–	4	–	0	3	–	7	–	0
Santa Clara	0	–	5	–	0	5	–	6	–	0
$ – Conference champion; ^ – NCAA Division II playoff participant; Rankings from NCAA Division II Football Committee poll

1991 NCAA Division II independents football records
	Conf.			Overall
Team	W	L	T	W		L		T
No. 20 Wofford ^		–		9	–	3	–	0
Springfield		–		7	–	3	–	0
Southern Connecticut State		–		6	–	3	–	0
UC Santa Barbara		–		5	–	3	–	0
Michigan Tech		–		6	–	4	–	0
Saint Mary's		–		6	–	5	–	0
Tennessee–Martin		–		5	–	6	–	0
Troy State		–		5	–	6	–	0
American International		–		4	–	5	–	1
New Haven		–		3	–	7	–	0
Wayne State (NE)		–		3	–	7	–	0
Kentucky State		–		2	–	9	–	0
Central Connecticut		–		1	–	8	–	1
Lees–McRae		–		1	–	9	–	0
^ – NCAA Division II playoff participant; Rankings from NCAA Division II Football Committee poll

== Conference summaries ==
Conference Champions

Central Intercollegiate Athletic Association – Winston-Salem State
Gulf South Conference – Jacksonville State
Lone Star Conference – Eastern New Mexico
Midwest Intercollegiate Football Conference – Butler
Missouri Intercollegiate Athletic Association – Pittsburg State
North Central Conference – North Dakota State
Northern California Athletic Conference – Sonoma State
Northern Intercollegiate Conference – Minnesota State–Moorhead
Pennsylvania State Athletic Conference – East Stroudsburg (East), Indiana (PA) (West)
Rocky Mountain Athletic Conference – Western State (CO)
South Atlantic Conference – Carson-Newman
Southern Intercollegiate Athletic Conference – Alabama A&M, Clark Atlanta, Fort Valley State, Morehouse, and Tuskegee
Western Football Conference – Portland State

== Postseason ==
1991 NCAA Division II Football Championship
- Teams: 16
- Finals Site: Braly Municipal Stadium; Florence, AL
- Champion: Pittsburg State; (5th title, title game)
- Runner-up: Jacksonville State; (3rd title game)
- Semifinalists: IUP; Portland State
- Winning coach: championship

The 1991 NCAA Division II Football Championship playoffs were the 19th single-elimination tournament to determine the national champion of men's NCAA Division II college football. The championship game was held at Braly Municipal Stadium in Florence, Alabama, for the sixth time.

=== Playoff bracket ===
First round Campus sites
Pittsburg State	26
Butler	16
East Texas State	36
Grand Valley State	15
Portland State	28
Northern Colorado	24
Mankato State	27
North Dakota State	7
Jacksonville State	49
Winston–Salem State	24
Mississippi College	28
Wofford	15
IUP	56
Virginia Union	7
Shippensburg	34*
East Stroudsburg	33

Quarterfinals; Campus sites
Pittsburg State	38
East Texas State	28
Portland State	37
Mankato State	27
Jacksonville State	35
Mississippi College	7
IUP	52
Shippensburg	7

Semifinals; Campus sites
Pittsburg State	53
Portland State	21
Jacksonville State	27
IUP	20

Championship; Braly Municipal Stadium; Florence, AL
Pittsburg State	23
Jacksonville State	6

== See also ==
- 1991 NCAA Division I-A football season
- 1991 NCAA Division I-AA football season
- 1991 NCAA Division III football season
- 1991 NAIA Division I football season
- 1991 NAIA Division II football season
