= 1989 NCAA Division II football season =

American college football season

- Regular season: August – November 1989
- Playoffs: November 18 – December 10, 1989
- National Championship: Braly Municipal Stadium; Florence, AL
- Champion: Mississippi College†
- Harlon Hill Trophy: Johnny Bailey, Texas A&I

The 1989 NCAA Division II football season, part of college football in the United States organized by the National Collegiate Athletic Association at the Division II level, began in August 1989, and concluded with the NCAA Division II Football Championship on December 10, 1989, at Braly Municipal Stadium in Florence, Alabama, hosted by the University of North Alabama. The Mississippi College Choctaws defeated the Jacksonville State Gamecocks, 3–0, to win their first Division II national title. However, their championship was later revoked by the NCAA.

The Harlon Hill Trophy was awarded to Johnny Bailey, running back from Texas A&I, for the third consecutive year.

== Conference changes and new programs ==
School	1988 Conference	1989 Conference
Lane	SIAC	Club Program
Missouri Southern	Central States (NAIA)	MIAA
Missouri Western	Central States (NAIA)	MIAA
Pittsburg State	Central States (NAIA)	MIAA
Washburn	Central States (NAIA)	MIAA

== Conference standings ==
1988 Central Intercollegiate Athletic Association football standings
	Conf.					Overall
Team	W		L		T	W		L		T
Northern Division
Bowie State xy$	5	–	1	–	0	7	–	3	–	1
Hampton	4	–	1	–	1	8	–	1	–	1
Virginia Union	4	–	1	–	1	6	–	2	–	1
Norfolk State	3	–	2	–	1	6	–	3	–	1
Virginia State	2	–	3	–	1	5	–	4	–	1
Elizabeth City State	0	–	6	–	0	2	–	8	–	0
Southern Division
Winston-Salem State xy	5	–	1	–	0	8	–	2	–	0
North Carolina Central	3	–	3	–	0	5	–	5	–	0
Johnson C. Smith	1	–	5	–	0	4	–	5	–	0
Livingstone	1	–	5	–	0	1	–	8	–	0
Fayetteville State	1	–	5	–	0	1	–	9	–	0
Championship: Bowie State 28, Winston-Salem State 24
$ – Conference champion; x – Division champion/co-champions; y – Championship game participant

1989 Great Lakes Intercollegiate Athletic Conference football standings
	Conf.					Overall
Team	W		L		T	W		L		T
No. 3 Grand Valley State $^	5	–	0	–	0	11	–	1	–	0
Hillsdale	3	–	2	–	0	6	–	4	–	0
Northern Michigan	3	–	2	–	0	5	–	5	–	0
Ferris State	2	–	3	–	0	6	–	5	–	0
Saginaw Valley State	2	–	3	–	0	3	–	6	–	0
Wayne State (MI)	0	–	5	–	0	2	–	8	–	0
$ – Conference champion; ^ – NCAA Division II playoff participant; Rankings from NCAA Division II Football Committee poll

1989 Gulf South Conference football standings
	Conf.					Overall
Team	W		L		T	W		L		T
No. 2 Jacksonville State $^	8	–	0	–	0	13	–	1	–	0
No. T–12 Mississippi College ^	6	–	2	–	0	11	–	3	–	0
Valdosta State	5	–	3	–	0	5	–	5	–	0
Delta State	4	–	3	–	1	6	–	3	–	1
North Alabama	4	–	4	–	0	6	–	5	–	0
Troy State	3	–	5	–	0	4	–	6	–	0
West Georgia	3	–	5	–	0	5	–	7	–	0
Livingston	1	–	6	–	1	3	–	7	–	1
Tennessee–Martin	1	–	7	–	0	2	–	9	–	0
$ – Conference champion; ^ – NCAA Division II playoff participant; Rankings from NCAA Division II Football Committee poll

1989 Heartland Collegiate Conference standings
	Conf.					Overall
Team	W		L		T	W		L		T
Butler $	4	–	0	–	0	7	–	2	–	1
Ashland	2	–	2	–	0	6	–	4	–	0
Indianapolis	2	–	2	–	0	4	–	5	–	0
Saint Joseph's (IN)	2	–	2	–	0	4	–	6	–	0
Valparaiso	0	–	4	–	0	0	–	10	–	0
$ – Conference champion

1989 Lone Star Conference football standings
	Conf.					Overall
Team	W		L		T	W		L		T
No. 1 Texas A&I $^	7	–	0	–	0	10	–	1	–	0
No. T–5 Angelo State ^	5	–	2	–	0	11	–	3	–	0
Eastern New Mexico	5	–	2	–	0	7	–	3	–	0
Abilene Christian	5	–	2	–	0	5	–	5	–	0
East Texas State	2	–	5	–	0	4	–	6	–	0
Cameron	2	–	5	–	0	3	–	7	–	0
West Texas State	2	–	5	–	0	3	–	8	–	0
Central State (OK)	0	–	7	–	0	0	–	10	–	1
$ – Conference champion; ^ – NCAA Division II playoff participant; Rankings from NCAA Division II Football Committee poll

1989 Missouri Intercollegiate Athletic Association football standings
	Conf.					Overall
Team	W		L		T	W		L		T
No. 4 Pittsburg State $^	10	–	0	–	0	12	–	1	–	0
No. 18 NW Missouri State ^	8	–	2	–	0	9	–	3	–	0
SE Missouri State	7	–	3	–	0	7	–	4	–	0
Missouri Southern State	6	–	4	–	0	6	–	4	–	0
Southwest Baptist	5	–	5	–	0	5	–	5	–	0
Central Missouri State	5	–	5	–	0	5	–	6	–	0
Missouri Western State	5	–	5	–	0	5	–	6	–	0
NE Missouri State	4	–	6	–	0	4	–	7	–	0
Washburn	3	–	7	–	0	3	–	7	–	0
Missouri–Rolla	1	–	9	–	0	1	–	9	–	0
Lincoln (MO)	1	–	9	–	0	1	–	10	–	0
$ – Conference champion; ^ – NCAA Division II playoff participant; Rankings from NCAA Division II Football Committee poll

1989 North Central Conference football standings
	Conf.					Overall
Team	W		L		T	W		L		T
No. T–5 St. Cloud State $^	8	–	1	–	0	10	–	2	–	0
No. 11 Augustana (SD) ^	6	–	2	–	1	8	–	3	–	1
No. 17 North Dakota State ^	6	–	2	–	1	8	–	3	–	1
Northern Colorado	5	–	4	–	0	6	–	4	–	0
Nebraska–Omaha	5	–	4	–	0	6	–	5	–	0
Mankato State	4	–	4	–	1	5	–	5	–	1
South Dakota	4	–	5	–	0	5	–	6	–	0
South Dakota State	3	–	6	–	0	5	–	6	–	0
North Dakota	2	–	6	–	1	3	–	7	–	1
Morningside	0	–	9	–	0	2	–	9	–	0
$ – Conference champion; ^ – NCAA Division II playoff participant; Rankings from NCAA Division II Football Committee poll

1989 Northern California Athletic Conference football standings
	Conf.					Overall
Team	W		L		T	W		L		T
No. 16 UC Davis $^	5	–	0	–	0	8	–	3	–	0
Chico State	4	–	1	–	0	6	–	4	–	0
Humboldt State	3	–	2	–	0	6	–	4	–	0
Sonoma State	2	–	3	–	0	4	–	6	–	0
Cal State Hayward	1	–	4	–	0	1	–	8	–	0
San Francisco State	0	–	5	–	0	3	–	7	–	0
$ – Conference champion; ^ – NCAA Division II playoff participant; Rankings from NCAA Division II Football Committee poll

1989 Northern Intercollegiate Conference football standings
	Conf.					Overall
Team	W		L		T	W		L		T
No. 14 Moorhead State $^	5	–	1	–	0	6	–	4	–	0
No. 12 Northern State	4	–	2	–	0	8	–	2	–	0
Southwest State (MN)	4	–	2	–	0	5	–	5	–	0
No. 19 Minnesota Morris	3	–	3	–	0	6	–	4	–	0
Minnesota Duluth	3	–	3	–	0	5	–	5	–	0
Bemidji State	2	–	4	–	0	4	–	5	–	0
Winona State	0	–	6	–	0	1	–	9	–	0
$ – Conference champion; ^ – NAIA Division I playoff participant; Rankings from NAIA Division I poll

1989 Pennsylvania State Athletic Conference football standings
	Conf.					Overall
Team	W		L		T	W		L		T
East Division
No. 8 West Chester x^	5	–	1	–	0	8	–	3	–	0
East Stroudsburg	4	–	2	–	0	6	–	4	–	0
Millersville	4	–	2	–	0	6	–	4	–	0
Cheyney	3	–	3	–	0	3	–	8	–	0
Mansfield	2	–	4	–	0	5	–	6	–	0
Bloomsburg	2	–	4	–	0	4	–	7	–	0
Kutztown	1	–	5	–	0	1	–	9	–	0
West Division
No. 7 Edinboro x^	6	–	0	–	0	8	–	3	–	0
No. 9 IUP ^	5	–	1	–	0	11	–	2	–	0
Clarion	3	–	3	–	0	3	–	7	–	0
Slippery Rock	2	–	3	–	1	4	–	5	–	1
California (PA)	2	–	4	–	0	4	–	6	–	0
Shippensburg	1	–	4	–	1	5	–	5	–	1
Lock Haven	1	–	5	–	0	2	–	9	–	0
x – Division champion/co-champions; ^ – NCAA Division II playoff participant; Rankings from NCAA Division II Football Committee poll

1989 Southern Intercollegiate Athletic Conference football standings
	Conf.					Overall
Team	W		L		T	W		L		T
Alabama A&M $^	6	–	0	–	0	8	–	4	–	0
Fort Valley State	5	–	1	–	0	7	–	3	–	0
Tuskegee	4	–	2	–	0	5	–	5	–	0
Albany State	2	–	4	–	0	5	–	5	–	0
Morehouse	2	–	4	–	0	2	–	6	–	1
Clark (GA)	1	–	5	–	0	3	–	7	–	0
Knoxville	0	–	6	–	0	1	–	8	–	0
Savannah State *	0	–	0	–	0	8	–	1	–	0
Morris Brown *	0	–	0	–	0	3	–	7	–	0
Miles	0	–	0	–	0	1	–	7	–	0
$ – Conference champion; ^ – NCAA Division II playoff participant; * - Savannah State and Morris Brown were both declared ineligible for the conference title: Savannah State for not meeting the Division II sponsorship requirements and Morris Brown for using an ineligible player in 1988

1989 Western Football Conference standings
	Conf.					Overall
Team	W		L		T	W		L		T
No. 14 Portland State $^	4	–	1	–	0	9	–	4	–	0
Cal State Northridge	4	–	2	–	0	6	–	5	–	0
Southern Utah State	4	–	2	–	0	5	–	5	–	0
Santa Clara	3	–	3	–	0	7	–	4	–	0
Sacramento State	2	–	3	–	0	5	–	4	–	0
Cal Poly	1	–	4	–	0	5	–	5	–	0
Cal Lutheran	0	–	3	–	0	3	–	6	–	0
$ – Conference champion; ^ – NCAA Division II playoff participant; Rankings from NCAA Division II Football Committee poll

1989 NCAA Division II independents football records
	Conf.			Overall
Team	W	L	T	W		L		T
No. T–12 New Haven		–		8	–	2	–	0
No. 19 American International		–		7	–	3	–	0
UCF		–		7	–	3	–	0
Saint Mary's		–		6	–	4	–	0
Wofford		–		6	–	5	–	0
Central Connecticut		–		5	–	5	–	0
Springfield		–		4	–	6	–	0
Southern Connecticut State		–		3	–	7	–	0
Michigan Tech		–		2	–	7	–	0
Kentucky State		–		2	–	9	–	0
Rankings from NCAA Division II Football Committee poll

== Conference summaries ==
Conference Champions

Central Intercollegiate Athletic Association – Bowie State
Great Lakes Intercollegiate Athletic Conference – Grand Valley State
Gulf South Conference – Jacksonville State
Heartland Collegiate Conference – Butler
Lone Star Conference – Texas A&I
Missouri Intercollegiate Athletic Association – Pittsburg State
North Central Conference – Saint Cloud State
Northern California Athletic Conference – UC Davis
Northern Intercollegiate Conference – Minnesota State–Moorhead
Pennsylvania State Athletic Conference – Millersville and West Chester (East), Edinboro
Rocky Mountain Athletic Conference – Adams State
South Atlantic Conference – Carson-Newman
Southern Intercollegiate Athletic Conference – Alabama A&M
Western Football League – Portland State

== Postseason ==
1989 NCAA Division II Football Championship
- Teams: 16
- Finals Site: Braly Municipal Stadium; Florence, AL
- Champion: Mississippi College†; (1st title, title game)
- Runner-up: Jacksonville State; (2nd title game)
- Semifinalists: IUP; Angelo State
- Winning coach: championship

The 1989 NCAA Division II Football Championship playoffs were the 17th single-elimination tournament to determine the national champion of men's NCAA Division II college football. The championship game was held at Braly Municipal Stadium in Florence, Alabama, for the fourth time.

=== Playoff bracket ===
First round Campus sites
Mississippi College†	34
Texas A&I	19
St. Cloud State	27
Augustana (SD)	20
Portland State	56***
West Chester	50
IUP	34
Grand Valley State	24
Pittsburg State	28
Northwest Missouri State	7
Angelo State	28
UC Davis	23
North Dakota State	45
Edinboro	32
Jacksonville State	33
Alabama A&M	9

Quarterfinals; Campus sites
Mississippi College†	55
St. Cloud State	24
Portland State	0
IUP	17
Pittsburg State	21
Angelo State	24
North Dakota State	17
Jacksonville State	21

Semifinals; Campus sites
Mississippi College†	26
IUP	14
Angelo State	16
Jacksonville State	34

Championship; Braly Municipal Stadium; Florence, AL
Mississippi College†	3
Jacksonville State	0

== See also ==
- 1989 NCAA Division I-A football season
- 1989 NCAA Division I-AA football season
- 1989 NCAA Division III football season
- 1989 NAIA Division I football season
- 1989 NAIA Division II football season
