= 1989 NCAA Division II football rankings =

The 1989 NCAA Division II football rankings are from the NCAA Division II football committee. This is for the 1989 season.

== Legend ==
	Increase in ranking
	Decrease in ranking
	Not ranked previous week
(#–#)	Win–loss record
(Italics)	Number of first place votes
т	Tied with team above or below also with this symbol

== NCAA Division II Football Committee poll ==
	Preseason	Week 1 Sept 12	Week 2 Sept 19	Week 3 Sept 26	Week 4 Oct 2	Week 5 Oct 9	Week 6 Oct 16	Week 7 Oct 23	Week 8 Oct 30	Week 9 Nov 6	
1.	North Dakota State	North Dakota State (1–0) (4)	North Dakota State (2–0) (4)	North Dakota State (3–0) (4)	North Dakota State (4–0) (4)	North Dakota State (5–0) (4)	North Dakota State (6–0) (4)	Texas A&I (7–0) (4)	Texas A&I (8–0) (4)	Texas A&I (9–0) (4)	1.
2.	Texas A&I	Texas A&I (2–0)	Texas A&I (2–0)	Texas A&I (3–0)	Texas A&I (4–0)	Texas A&I (5–0)	Texas A&I (6–0)	Jacksonville State (8–0)	Jacksonville State (8–0)	Jacksonville State (9–0)	2.
3.	Portland State	Portland State (2–0)	Jacksonville State (3–0)	Jacksonville State (4–0)	Jacksonville State (5–0)	Jacksonville State (6–0)	Jacksonville State (7–0)	Grand Valley State (8–0)	Grand Valley State (9–0)	Grand Valley State (10–0)	3.
4.	Jacksonville State	Jacksonville State (2–0)	IUP (2–0)	Angelo State (4–0)	Angelo State (5–0)	Grand Valley State (6–0)	Grand Valley State (7–0)	Pittsburg State (8–0)	Pittsburg State (9–0)	Pittsburg State (10–0)	4.
5.	Sacramento State	Sacramento State (2–0)	Angelo State (3–0)	Grand Valley State (4–0)	Grand Valley State (5–0)	Winston–Salem State (6–0)	Winston–Salem State (7–0)	Angelo State (7–1)	Angelo State (8–1) т	Angelo State (9–1) т	5.
6.	IUP	IUP (1–0)	Augustana (SD) (3–0)	Winston–Salem State (4–0)	Winston–Salem State (5–0)	Pittsburg State (6–0)	Pittsburg State (7–0)	St. Cloud State (6–1)	St. Cloud State (7–1) т	St. Cloud State (8–1) т	6.
7.	Mississippi College	Angelo State (2–0)	Grand Valley State (3–0)	Shippensburg (4–0)	Shippensburg (5–0)	Fort Valley State (5–0)	Angelo State (6–1)	Edinboro (6–1)	Edinboro (7–1)	Edinboro (8–1)	7.
8.	Winston–Salem State	Winston–Salem State (2–0)	Winston–Salem State (3–0)	Mississippi College (3–1)	Pittsburg State (5–0)	Sacramento State (4–1)	Edinboro (5–1)	North Dakota State (6–1)	West Chester (7–1)	West Chester (8–1)	8.
9.	Millersville	Millersville (1–0)	Shippensburg (3–0)	Pittsburg State (4–0)	Fort Valley State (4–0)	Angelo State (5–1)	St. Cloud State (5–1) т	West Chester (6–1)	IUP (7–1)	IUP (8–1)	9.
10.	St. Cloud State	Grand Valley State (2–0)	Portland State (2–1)	Ferris State (4–0)	Northwest Missouri State (5–0)	Shippensburg (5–0–1)	West Chester (5–1) т	IUP (6–1)	North Dakota State (6–1–1) т	Winston–Salem State (8–1)	10.
11.	Butler	Augustana (SD) (2–0)	Pittsburg State (3–0)	Northern Colorado (3–0)	Sacramento State (4–1)	Edinboro (4–1)	IUP (5–1)	Winston–Salem State (7–1)	Winston–Salem State (8–1) т	Augustana (SD) (7–2–1)	11.
12.	Angelo State	Shippensburg (2–0)	West Chester (2–0)	Fort Valley State (3–0)	Edinboro (3–1)	West Chester (4–1)	UC Davis (5–1)	UC Davis (6–1)	Augustana (SD) (6–2–1) т	Mississippi College (7–2) т	12.
13.	North Carolina Central	St. Cloud State (1–0)	Mississippi College (2–1)	Northwest Missouri State (4–0)	West Chester (3–1)	St. Cloud State (4–1)	Fort Valley State (5–1)	Mississippi College (6–2)	Mississippi College (7–2) т	New Haven (8–1) т	13.
14.	Augustana (SD)	Albany State (1–0)	South Dakota State (3–0)	Virginia Union (3–0)	St. Cloud State (3–1)	Hillsdale (5–1)	Portland State (5–2)	Northwest Missouri State (7–1) т	New Haven (7–1)	Portland State (7–3)	14.
15.	UC Davis	UC Davis (1–0)	Ferris State (3–0)	South Dakota State (3–1)	Hillsdale (4–1)	Mississippi College (4–2)	Mississippi College (5–2) т	Virginia Union (6–1) т	Fort Valley State (6–2)	Santa Clara (7–3)	15.
16.	Grand Valley State	Pittsburg State (1–0)	Virginia State (3–0)	Edinboro (4–0)	Nebraska–Omaha (5–0)	UC Davis (4–1)	Northwest Missouri State (6–1) т	Augustana (SD) (6–2)	Portland State (6–3)	UC Davis (7–2)	16.
17.	Shippensburg	Virginia State (1–0)	UC Davis (2–0)	Sacramento State (3–1)	UC Davis (3–1)	IUP (4–1)	Virginia Union (5–1)	New Haven (6–1)	Virginia Union (6–1–1)	North Dakota State (6–2–1)	17.
18.	East Texas State	Mississippi College (1–1)	Fort Valley State (3–0)	Augustana (SD) (3–1)	Mississippi College (3–2)	Portland State (4–2)	Augustana (SD) (5–2)	Ashland (6–1)	Santa Clara (7–1)	Northwest Missouri State (8–2)	18.
19.	Albany State	Ferris State (2–0)	Virginia Union (2–1)	West Chester (2–1)	Norfolk State (5–0)	American International (5–0–1) т	Ashland (5–1)	Eastern New Mexico (6–1) т	Northwest Missouri State (7–2)	American International (7–2)	19.
20.	North Dakota	East Texas State (2–0)	Northwest Missouri State (3–0)	Hillsdale (3–0) т	IUP (3–1)	North Alabama (4–2) т	Tuskegee (5–1)	Sacramento State (5–2) т	Butler (6–2–1)	Butler (7–2–1)	20.
21.				North Alabama (3–0) т							21.
	Preseason	Week 1 Sept 12	Week 2 Sept 19	Week 3 Sept 26	Week 4 Oct 2	Week 5 Oct 9	Week 6 Oct 16	Week 7 Oct 23	Week 8 Oct 30	Week 9 Nov 6	
		Dropped: 11 Butler; 13 North Carolina Central; 20 North Dakota	Dropped: 5 Sacramento State; 9 Millersville; 13 St. Cloud State; 14 Albany State; 20 East Texas State	Dropped: 4 IUP; 10 Portland State; 16 Virginia State; 17 UC Davis	Dropped: 10 Ferris State; 11 Northern Colorado; 14 Virginia Union; 15 South Dakota State; 18 Augustana (SD); 20 North Alabama	Dropped: 10 Northwest Missouri State; 16 Nebraska–Omaha; 19 Norfolk State	Dropped: 8 Sacramento State; 10 Shippensburg; 14 Hillsdale; 19 American International; 20 North Alabama	Dropped: 13 Fort Valley State; 14 Portland State; 20 Tuskegee	Dropped: 12 UC Davis; 18 Ashland; 19 Eastern New Mexico; 20 Sacramento State	Dropped: 15 Fort Valley State; 17 Virginia Union	
