= Vernon Turner =

American football player (born 1967)

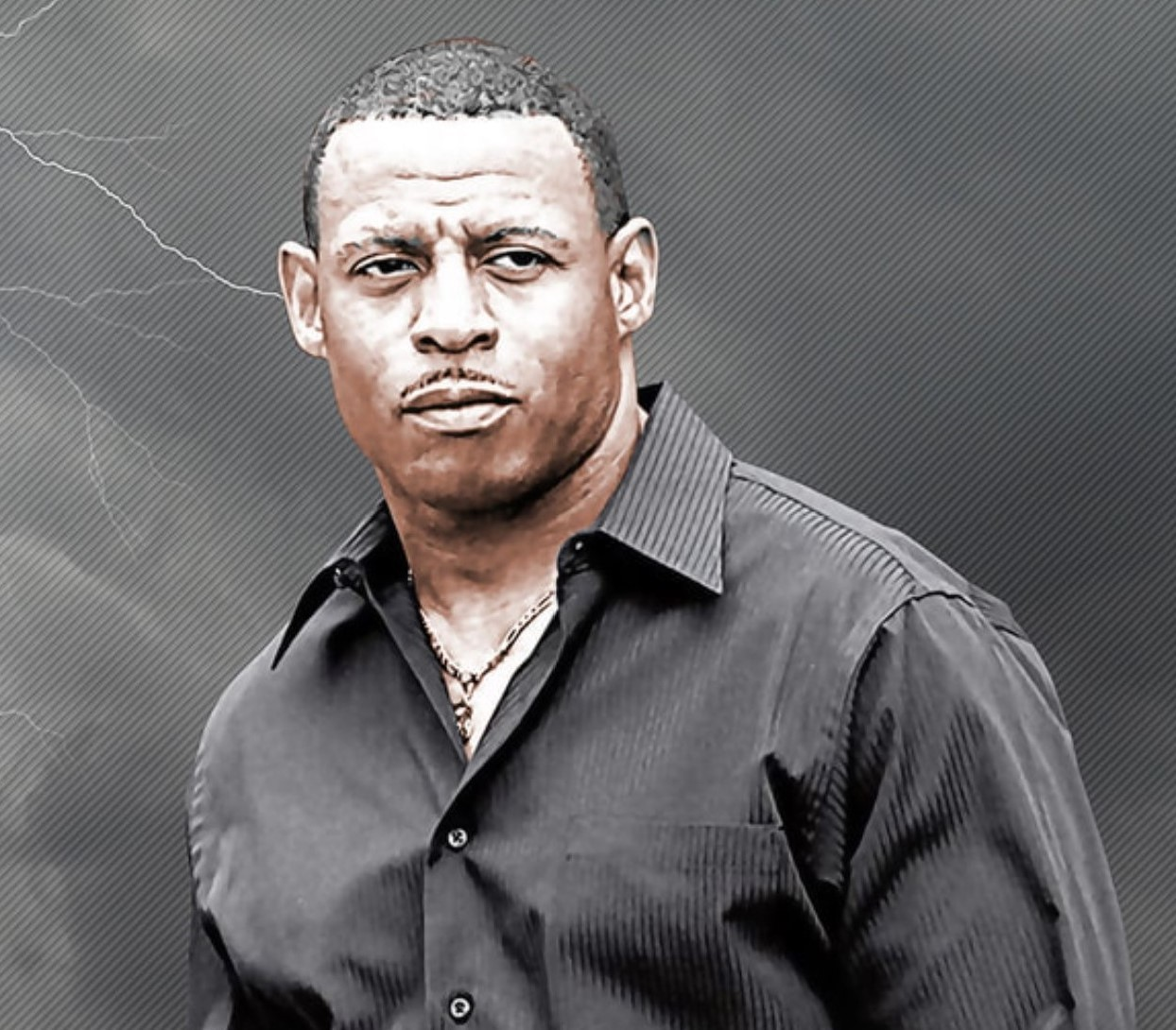

No. 86, 82, 30, 44, 45, 23, 20
- Positions: Running back, wide receiver, return specialist

Personal information
- Born: January 6, 1967 (age 59); New York City, U.S.
- Listed height: 5 ft 8 in (1.73 m)
- Listed weight: 185 lb (84 kg)

Career information
- High school: Curtis (Staten Island, New York)
- College: Carson–Newman
- NFL draft: 1990: undrafted

Career history
- Denver Broncos (1990)*; Buffalo Bills (1990); Los Angeles Rams (1991–1992); Detroit Lions (1993); Tampa Bay Buccaneers (1993–1994); Carolina Panthers (1995)*; Detroit Lions (1995); Tampa Bay Buccaneers (1996)*; Frankfurt Galaxy (1997–1998); Scottish Claymores (1998)
- * Offseason or practice squad member only

Awards and highlights
- 3× NAIA national champion (1986, 1988, 1989); First-team All-SAC (1989)

Career NFL statistics
- Kick return yards: 2,626
- Punt return yards: 817
- Rushing yards: 71
- Receiving yards: 90
- Touchdowns: 2
- Stats at Pro Football Reference

Vernon Turner (born January 6, 1967) is an American former professional football player who was a running back, wide receiver and return specialist in the National Football League (NFL) and NFL Europe for eight seasons during the 1990s. Turner played college football for the Carson–Newman Eagles, and then professionally for the Buffalo Bills, Los Angeles Rams, Detroit Lions and Tampa Bay Buccaneers of the NFL. He concluded his career with the Frankfurt Galaxy and Scottish Claymores in NFL Europe.

== Early life and college career ==
Born in Bedford–Stuyvesant, a neighborhood in the central portion of the New York City borough of Brooklyn, Turner is the oldest of five children, with two brothers and two sisters. Growing up in difficult circumstances, he moved from the slum area in Brooklyn to the quiet neighborhood of Sunnyside on Staten Island while a young child. His mother died when he was a freshman in high school and his stepfather while he was in college.

Turner attended Curtis High School on Staten Island where he played football as a quarterback and also lettered in track and field. He earned all-city and all-state honors and left the school with over 4,000 yards passing. In November 2011, Curtis High School inducted him into its Hall of Fame.

After graduating from high school, Turner enrolled at Carson–Newman College in Jefferson City, Tennessee, where he was recruited by head coach Ken Sparks to play running back. At the time, the school still was a member of the National Association of Intercollegiate Athletics (NAIA), earning five NAIA Division I national championships during the 1980s.

Turner was part of three of those championships when the Eagles won the title in 1986, 1988, and 1989. As a junior in 1988, he led the team in rushing with 1,257 yards on 232 carries, and in scoring with 96 points. During the championship game in December 1988, the running back helped to lead Carson–Newman to a 56–17 victory over Adams State University of Colorado while rushing for 189 yards and three touchdowns. He scored his first six points on an 80-yards run in the game's first play from scrimmage. His performance earned him offensive player of the game honors. Despite concluding his senior campaign only second in rushing yards to teammate Robert Thomas, he was selected to the first team All-South Atlantic Conference in 1989. That year, Turner ran for 869 yards and 12 touchdowns, and also returned 10 kickoffs for 263 yards, including one for 73 yards. He made his last appearance for Carson–Newman during the national championship game on December 16 when the team defeated Emporia State University of Kansas 34–20, marking the Eagles' third title in four years. The New York native finished his collegiate career ranked second in school history with 569 rushing attempts, and fourth with 2,851 rushing yards and 28 rushing touchdowns.

== Professional career ==
After going unselected in the 1990 NFL draft, Turner signed as a free agent with the Denver Broncos, but did not make the team. He subsequently joined the Buffalo Bills practice squad and played in one regular season game. In 1991, he joined the Los Angeles Rams, playing as their primary kickoff and punt returner through the 1992 season.

In 1993, Turner signed with the Detroit Lions, backing up return specialist Mel Gray. After being released, he played the last game of the season for the Tampa Bay Buccaneers, and was Tampa's primary return specialist during the 1994 season. In 1995, Turner split time with the Carolina Panthers and Detroit Lions. After a three-year stint in NFL Europe, Turner retired in 1998.

== Post-football career ==
Since retiring from football, Turner has pursued business interests. He owned an office furniture installation business in North Carolina, moved into the tire manufacturing business, and currently works in the oil refining industry in Houston, Texas.
