= Ken Sparks =

American football player and coach (1944–2017)

Biographical details
- Born: February 25, 1944; Knoxville, Tennessee, U.S.
- Died: March 29, 2017 (aged 73); Knoxville, Tennessee, U.S.

Playing career
- 1967: Carson–Newman
- Position: Wide receiver

Coaching career (HC unless noted)
- 1977–1979: Farragut HS (TN)
- 1980–2016: Carson–Newman

Head coaching record
- Overall: 338–99–2 (college); 29–5 (high school)
- Tournaments: 19–5 (NAIA D-I playoffs); 19–15 (NCAA D-II playoffs)

Accomplishments and honors

Championships
- 5 NAIA Division I (1983–1984, 1986, 1988–1989); 21 SAC (1982–1984, 1986, 1988–1991, 1993–1999, 2002–2004, 2007–2009)

Awards
- NAIA Division I Coach of the Year (1984)
- College Football Hall of Fame; Inducted in 2026 (profile)

Ken Sparks (February 25, 1944 – March 29, 2017) was an American football coach and player. He served as the head football coach at Carson–Newman University in Jefferson City, Tennessee from 1980 until his retirement at the end of the 2016 season. He is currently the record-holder for the most wins as a coach in NCAA Division II history. His Carson–Newman Eagles won five NAIA Championships (1983–1984, 1986, 1988–1989), and were three times runners-up in the NCAA Division II playoffs (1996, 1998, and 1999).

== Biography ==
Sparks was born in Knoxville, Tennessee. He played college football as a wide receiver at Carson–Newman and graduated from the school in 1968. He was football coach at Gibbs High School in Knoxville. The next year, he received a master's degree from Tennessee Technological University where he also coached quarterbacks and receivers. He coached at Morristown East High School in Morristown, Tennessee.

In the early 1970s, Sparks was an assistant coach on the Carson–Newman football team that was a runner up in the NAIA championship game. He coached the school's track team and he was named Southern Collegiate Track Coach of the Year. In 1977, he returned to Carson–Newman, where he coached the track team.

In the fall, he coached at Farragut High School in Knoxville where he accumulated a 29–5 record. Among his players was Bill Bates.

Following his string of successes, Carson–Newman built the new Burke–Tarr Stadium in 2005.

Sparks, who was once Fellowship of Christian Athletes National Coach of the Year, actively pursues a Christian aspect in his coaching and is a popular public speaker. He was quoted as saying that, if football can be used as a tool to bring people to the Lord, then "it has done something. If it hasn't, we haven't done a thing, no matter how many games we won."

After 37 years as the head coach at Carson–Newman University, Ken Sparks announced his retirement on November 14, 2016, at a press conference in the Ken Sparks Athletic Complex on the campus of Carson–Newman University.

Sparks died March 29, 2017, after a four-year battle with prostate cancer.

== Head coaching record ==
=== College ===
Year	Team	Overall	Conference	Standing	Bowl/playoffs	NAIA/NCAA/AFCA^{#}
Carson–Newman Eagles (South Atlantic Conference) (1980–2016)
1980	Carson–Newman	7–3	5–2	3rd		
1981	Carson–Newman	7–4	4–3	3rd		
1982	Carson–Newman	10–2	6–1	1st	L NAIA Division I Quarterfinal	3
1983	Carson–Newman	10–3	6–1	1st	W NAIA Division I Championship	12
1984	Carson–Newman	10–2–1	6–1	1st	T NAIA Division I Championship	5
1985	Carson–Newman	5–5	3–4	5th		
1986	Carson–Newman	12–1	6–1	1st	W NAIA Division I Championship	2
1987	Carson–Newman	10–4	4–3	T–3rd	L NAIA Division I Championship	9
1988	Carson–Newman	12–2	5–2	T–1st	W NAIA Division I Championship	8
1989	Carson–Newman	12–1	6–1	1st	W NAIA Division I Championship	4
1990	Carson–Newman	11–1	7–0	1st	L NAIA Division I Semifinal	1
1991	Carson–Newman	10–1	7–0	1st	L NAIA Division I Quarterfinal	3
1992	Carson–Newman	8–3	6–1	2nd	L NAIA Division I Quarterfinal	5
1993	Carson–Newman	8–2–1	6–1	1st	L NCAA Division II First Round	14
1994	Carson–Newman	8–3	6–1	T–1st	L NCAA Division II First Round	16
1995	Carson–Newman	9–3	6–1	1st	L NCAA Division II Quarterfinal	6
1996	Carson–Newman	12–2	6–1	1st	L NCAA Division II Championship	6
1997	Carson–Newman	11–1	7–0	1st	L NCAA Division II Semifinal	1
1998	Carson–Newman	12–2	7–0	1st	L NCAA Division II Championship	3
1999	Carson–Newman	13–1	8–0	1st	L NCAA Division II Championship	1
2000	Carson–Newman	8–2	5–2	3rd		7 (South)
2001	Carson–Newman	6–3	5–2	T–2nd		
2002	Carson–Newman	12–1	7–0	1st	L NCAA Division II Quarterfinal	3
2003	Carson–Newman	11–2	6–1	1st	L NCAA Division II Quarterfinal	8
2004	Carson–Newman	9–3	6–1	1st	L NCAA Division II Second Round	14
2005	Carson–Newman	8–2	5–2	2nd		
2006	Carson–Newman	8–3	4–3	4th		
2007	Carson–Newman	10–1	5–1	T–1st		14
2008	Carson–Newman	7–4	5–2	T–1st	L NCAA Division II First Round	18
2009	Carson–Newman	11–3	7–0	1st	L NCAA Division II Semifinal	4
2010	Carson–Newman	7–4	5–2	2nd		
2011	Carson–Newman	5–6	3–4	5th		
2012	Carson–Newman	9–3	5–2	2nd	L NCAA Division II Quarterfinal	13
2013	Carson–Newman	10–3	5–2	2nd	L NCAA Division II Second Round	17
2014	Carson–Newman	7–3	5–2	2nd		
2015	Carson–Newman	9–3	5–2	T–2nd	L NCAA Division II First Round	21
2016	Carson–Newman	4–7	2–5	7th		
Carson–Newman:		338–99–2	203–57			
Total:		338–99–2				
National championship Conference title Conference division title or championship game berth
^{#}Rankings from NAIA Division I poll from 1982 to 1992, NCAA Division II Football Committee poll from 1993 to 1999, AFCA poll from 2000 to 2015.

== See also ==
- List of college football career coaching wins leaders
- List of presidents of the American Football Coaches Association
