= 1984 Carson–Newman Eagles football team =

American college football season

1984 Carson–Newman Eagles football

NAIA Division I national co-champion SAC champion

Champion Bowl, T 19–19 vs. Central Arkansas
- Conference: South Atlantic Conference
- Record: 10–2–1 (6–1 SAC)
- Head coach: Ken Sparks (5th season)
- Home stadium: Burke–Tarr Stadium

1984 South Atlantic Conference football standings
	Conf.					Overall
Team	W		L		T	W		L		T
No. 5 Carson–Newman $^	6	–	1	–	0	10	–	2	–	1
No. 13 Elon	5	–	2	–	0	7	–	3	–	0
Newberry	5	–	2	–	0	7	–	4	–	0
Presbyterian	5	–	2	–	0	7	–	4	–	0
Mars Hill	4	–	3	–	0	6	–	5	–	0
Gardner–Webb	2	–	5	–	0	4	–	6	–	0
Lenoir–Rhyne	1	–	6	–	0	1	–	10	–	0
Catawba	0	–	7	–	0	3	–	8	–	0
$ – Conference champion; ^ – NAIA Division I playoff participant; Rankings from NAIA Division I poll

The 1984 Carson–Newman Eagles football team was an American football team that represented Carson–Newman College (renamed Carson–Newman University in 2012) as a member of the South Atlantic Conference (SAC) during the 1984 NAIA Division I football season. In its fifth year under head coach Ken Sparks, the team compiled a 10–2–1 record (6–1 against conference opponents), won the SAC championship, and tied Central Arkansas in the Champion Bowl to become the NAIA national co-champion.

It was the second of five national championships (1983, 1984, 1986, 1988, and 1989) won by Carson–Newman during the 1980s.

== Schedule ==
Date	Time	Opponent	Site	Result	Attendance	Source
September 8	7:30 p.m.	Grand Valley State*	Burke-Toney Stadium; Morristown, TN	W 42–9	2,800–3,800	
September 15		Franklin (IN)*	Burke–Tarr Stadium; Jefferson City, TN	W 58–20	3,100	
September 22		at Elon	Burlington Memorial Stadium; Burlington, NC	L 29–31		
September 29		at Catawba	Shuford Stadium; Salisbury, NC	W 50–7	3,600	
October 6		Newberry	Burke–Tarr Stadium; Jefferson City, TN	W 44–21	4,700	
October 13		at Mars Hill	Meares Stadium; Mars Hill, NC	W 24–10	3,000	
October 20		Gardner–Webb	Burke–Tarr Stadium; Jefferson City, TN	W 25–14		
October 27		at Lenoir–Rhyne	Moretz Stadium; Hickory, NC	W 28–20	4,500	
November 10		Presbyterian	Burke–Tarr Stadium; Jefferson City, TN	W 17–14		
November 17		at Liberty*	City Stadium; Lynchburg, VA	W 14–7	2,733	
December 1		Concord*	Burke–Tarr Stadium; Jefferson City, TN (NAIA Division I quarterfinal)	W 42–6		
December 8		Saginaw Valley State*	Burke–Tarr Stadium; Jefferson City, TN (NAIA Division I seminfinal)	W 24–21 ^{2OT}	2,860	
December 15		vs. Central Arkansas*	Estes Stadium; Conway, AR (Champion Bowl)	T 19–19	5,764	
*Non-conference game; All times are in Eastern time
