= Pat O'Neal =

American football coach

Playing career
- 1951–1954: Oklahoma

Coaching career (HC unless noted)
- 1959–1971: East Central (assistant)
- 1972–1989: East Central

Head coaching record
- Overall: 96–88–4
- Bowls: 0–1
- Tournaments: 0–1 (NAIA D-I playoffs)

Accomplishments and honors

Championships
- 8 OIC (1975, 1978–1980, 1984–1987)

Pat O'Neal is a retired American football coach. He is known for coaching East Central University in Ada, Oklahoma from 1972 to 1989, where he won 96 games and retired as the program's all-time winningest coach. Prior to that, he played under coach Bud Wilkinson at the University of Oklahoma from 1951 to 1954.

== Head coaching record ==
Year	Team	Overall	Conference	Standing	Bowl/playoffs
East Central Tigers (Oklahoma Collegiate Conference) (1972–1973)
1972	East Central	4–7	4–4	6th	
1973	East Central	4–7	3–4	6th	
East Central Tigers (Oklahoma Intercollegiate Conference) (1974–1989)
1974	East Central	4–7	2–3	T–4th	
1975	East Central	9–3–1	5–0	1st	L Bicentennial Bowl
1976	East Central	6–3–2	1–2–1	T–3rd	
1977	East Central	5–5	1–3	4th	
1978	East Central	4–6	4–0	1st	
1979	East Central	6–4	4–0	1st	
1980	East Central	7–3	3–1	T–1st	
1981	East Central	2–7	2–2	T–2nd	
1982	East Central	5–5	2–2	3rd	
1983	East Central	7–3	2–2	T–2nd	
1984	East Central	10–2	4–0	1st	L NAIA Division I Quarterfinal
1985	East Central	5–4–1	3–1	T–1st	
1986	East Central	7–3	3–1	T–1st	
1987	East Central	5–5	3–1	T–1st	
1988	East Central	4–6	2–2	T–2nd	
1989	East Central	2–8	1–3	T–4th	
East Central:		96–88–4	49–31–1		
Total:		96–88–4			
National championship Conference title Conference division title or championship game berth
