= 1988 Carson–Newman Eagles football team =

American college football season

1988 Carson–Newman Eagles football

NAIA Division I national champion SAC champion

Champion Bowl, W 56–21 vs. Adams State
- Conference: South Atlantic Conference
- Record: 12–2 (5–2 SAC)
- Head coach: Ken Sparks (9th season)
- Home stadium: Burke–Tarr Stadium

1988 South Atlantic Conference football standings
	Conf.					Overall
Team	W		L		T	W		L		T
No. 8 Carson–Newman +^	5	–	2	–	0	12	–	2	–	0
No. 13 Catawba +^	5	–	2	–	0	8	–	4	–	0
No. 20 Lenoir–Rhyne +	5	–	2	–	0	6	–	5	–	0
No. 22 Elon	4	–	3	–	0	6	–	5	–	0
Mars Hill	4	–	3	–	0	5	–	5	–	0
Gardner–Webb	2	–	5	–	0	4	–	6	–	1
Newberry	2	–	5	–	0	3	–	8	–	0
Presbyterian	1	–	6	–	0	3	–	8	–	0
+ – Conference co-champions; ^ – NAIA Division I playoff participant; Rankings from NAIA Division I poll

The 1988 Carson–Newman Eagles football team was an American football team that represented Carson–Newman College (renamed Carson–Newman University in 2012) as a member of the South Atlantic Conference (SAC) during the 1988 NAIA Division I football season. In its ninth year under head coach Ken Sparks, the team compiled a 12–2 record (5–2 against conference opponents), tied for the SAC championship, and defeated Adams State in the Champion Bowl to win the NAIA national championship.

It was the fourth of five national championships (1983, 1984, 1986, 1988 and 1989) won by Carson–Newman during the 1980s.

== Schedule ==
Date	Opponent	Site	Result	Attendance	Source
September 3	Fairmont State*	Burke–Tarr Stadium; Jefferson City, TN	W 17–12	3,642	
September 10	at Hillsdale*	Frank "Muddy" Waters Stadium; Hillsdale, MI	W 24–14	5,500	
September 17	Wingate*	Burke–Tarr Stadium; Jefferson City, TN	W 36–24	3,100	
September 24	at Elon	Burlington Memorial Stadium; Burlington, NC	L 7–10		
October 1	Catawba	Shuford Stadium; Salisbury, NC	W 3–0		
October 8	Newberry	Burke–Tarr Stadium; Jefferson City, TN	L 13–14		
October 15	at Mars Hill	Meares Stadium; Mars Hill, NC	W 34–16	4,250	
October 22	Gardner–Webb	Burke–Tarr Stadium; Jefferson City, TN	W 22–12	4,100	
October 29	at Lenoir–Rhyne	Moretz Stadium; Hickory, NC	W 28–21		
November 12	Presbyterian	Burke–Tarr Stadium; Jefferson City, TN	W 52–21	4,100	
November 26	Concord*	Burke–Tarr Stadium; Jefferson City, TN (NAIA Division I first round)	W 62–29	1,548	
December 3	Moorhead State*	Burke–Tarr Stadium; Jefferson City, TN (NAIA Division I quarterfinal)	W 42–6		
December 10	at Central State (OH)*	McPherson Stadium; Wilberforce, OH (NAIA Division I semifinal)	W 13–0		
December 17	Adams State*	Burke–Tarr Stadium; Jefferson City, TN (Champion Bowl)	W 56–21	4,656	
*Non-conference game
