= 1986 Carson–Newman Eagles football team =

American college football season

1986 Carson–Newman Eagles football

NAIA Division I national co-champion SAC champion

Champion Bowl, W 17–0 vs. Cameron
- Conference: South Atlantic Conference
- Record: 12–1 (6–1 SAC)
- Head coach: Ken Sparks (7th season)
- Home stadium: Burke–Tarr Stadium

1986 South Atlantic Conference football standings
	Conf.					Overall
Team	W		L		T	W		L		T
No. 2 Carson–Newman $^	6	–	1	–	0	12	–	1	–	0
No. 12 Elon	5	–	2	–	0	8	–	2	–	0
No. 15 Mars Hill	4	–	3	–	0	7	–	3	–	1
Gardner–Webb	4	–	3	–	0	6	–	5	–	0
Catawba	3	–	4	–	0	5	–	6	–	0
Presbyterian	3	–	4	–	0	5	–	6	–	0
Newberry	2	–	5	–	0	4	–	7	–	0
Lenoir–Rhyne	1	–	6	–	0	4	–	7	–	0
$ – Conference champion; ^ – NAIA Division I playoff participant; Rankings from NAIA Division I poll

The 1986 Carson–Newman Eagles football team was an American football team that represented Carson–Newman College (renamed Carson–Newman University in 2012) as a member of the South Atlantic Conference (SAC) during the 1986 NAIA Division I football season. In its seventh year under head coach Ken Sparks, the team compiled a 12–1 record (6–1 against conference opponents), won the SAC championship, and defeated Cameron in the Champion Bowl to win the NAIA national championship.

It was the third of five national championships (1983, 1984, 1986, 1988, and 1989) won by Carson–Newman during the 1980s.

== Schedule ==
Date	Opponent	Site	Result	Attendance	Source
September 6	at Wofford*	Synder Field; Spartanburg, SC	W 17–15		
September 13	Georgetown (KY)*	Burke–Tarr Stadium; Jefferson City, TN	W 38–14		
September 27	vs. Elon	Burlington Memorial Stadium; Burlington, NC	L 12–15		
October 4	at Catawba	Shuford Stadium; Salisbury, NC	W 17–6		
October 11	Newberry	Burke–Tarr Stadium; Jefferson City, TN	W 28–0		
October 18	at Mars Hill	Meares Stadium; Mars Hill, NC	W 10–7		
October 25	Gardner–Webb	Burke–Tarr Stadium; Jefferson City, TN	W 51–24		
November 1	at Lenoir–Rhyne	Moretz Stadium; Hickory, NC	W 24–6		
November 8	Liberty*	Burke–Tarr Stadium; Jefferson City, TN	W 34–20	5,483	
November 15	Presbyterian	Burke–Tarr Stadium; Jefferson City, TN	W 19–0		
December 6	Shepherd*	Burke–Tarr Stadium; Jefferson City, TN (NAIA Division I quarterfinal)	W 30–10	2,649	
December 13	at Hillsdale*	Frank "Muddy" Waters Stadium; Hillsdale, MI (NAIA Division I semifinal)	W 19–16 ^{OT}	1,500	
December 20	vs. Cameron*	Burke–Tarr Stadium; Jefferson City, TN (Champion Bowl)	W 17–0	5,233	
*Non-conference game
