= 1983 Carson–Newman Eagles football team =

American college football season

1983 Carson–Newman Eagles football

NAIA Division I national champion SAC champion

Palm Bowl, W 36–28 vs. Mesa State
- Conference: South Atlantic Conference
- Record: 10–3 (6–1 SAC)
- Head coach: Ken Sparks (4th season)
- Home stadium: Burke–Tarr Stadium

1983 South Atlantic Conference football standings
	Conf.					Overall
Team	W		L		T	W		L		T
No. 12 Carson–Newman $^	6	–	1	–	0	10	–	3	–	0
Presbyterian	4	–	2	–	1	5	–	5	–	1
No. 18 Elon	4	–	3	–	0	7	–	3	–	0
Gardner–Webb	4	–	3	–	0	5	–	6	–	0
Mars Hill	3	–	3	–	1	4	–	7	–	1
Newberry	3	–	4	–	0	6	–	5	–	0
Lenoir–Rhyne	2	–	5	–	0	4	–	6	–	0
Catawba	0	–	7	–	0	0	–	9	–	1
$ – Conference champion; ^ – NAIA Division I playoff participant; Rankings from NAIA Division I poll

The 1983 Carson–Newman Eagles football team was an American football team that represented Carson–Newman College (renamed Carson–Newman University in 2012) as a member of the South Atlantic Conference (SAC) during the 1983 NAIA Division I football season. In its fourth year under head coach Ken Sparks, the team compiled a 10–3 record (6–1 against conference opponents), won the SAC championship, and defeated Mesa State in the Palm Bowl to win the NAIA national championship.

It was the first of five national championships (1983, 1984, 1986, 1988, and 1989) won by Carson–Newman during the 1980s.

== Schedule ==
Date	Opponent	Site	Result	Attendance	Source
September 10	at Furman*	Paladin Stadium; Greenville, SC	L 7–52	9,226	
September 17	at Franklin (IN)*	Franklin, IN	L 20–24		
September 24	Elon	Burke–Tarr Stadium; Jefferson City, TN	W 15–6		
October 1	Catawba	Burke–Tarr Stadium; Jefferson City, TN	W 31–9		
October 8	Newberry	Setzler Field; Newberry, SC	W 11–10	3,200	
October 22	at Gardner–Webb	Ernest W. Spangler Stadium; Boiling Springs, NC	W 24–20		
October 29	Lenoir–Rhyne	Burke–Tarr Stadium; Jefferson City, TN	W 21–15	3,500	
November 5	Central Florida*	Burke–Tarr Stadium; Jefferson City, TN	W 35–14	3,300	
November 12	at Presbyterian	Bailey Stadium; Clinton, SC	L 7–28		
December 3	Shepherd*	Burke–Tarr Stadium; Jefferson City, TN (NAIA Division I quarterfinal)	W 42–21	2,000	
December 10	Saginaw Valley State*	Burke–Tarr Stadium; Jefferson City, TN (NAIA Division I semifinal)	W 41–7	1,544	
December 17	vs. Mesa State*	Ralph Stocker Stadium; Grand Junction, CO (Palm Bowl)	W 36–28	8,836	
*Non-conference game
