= Carson–Newman Eagles football =

Football team of Carson–Newman University

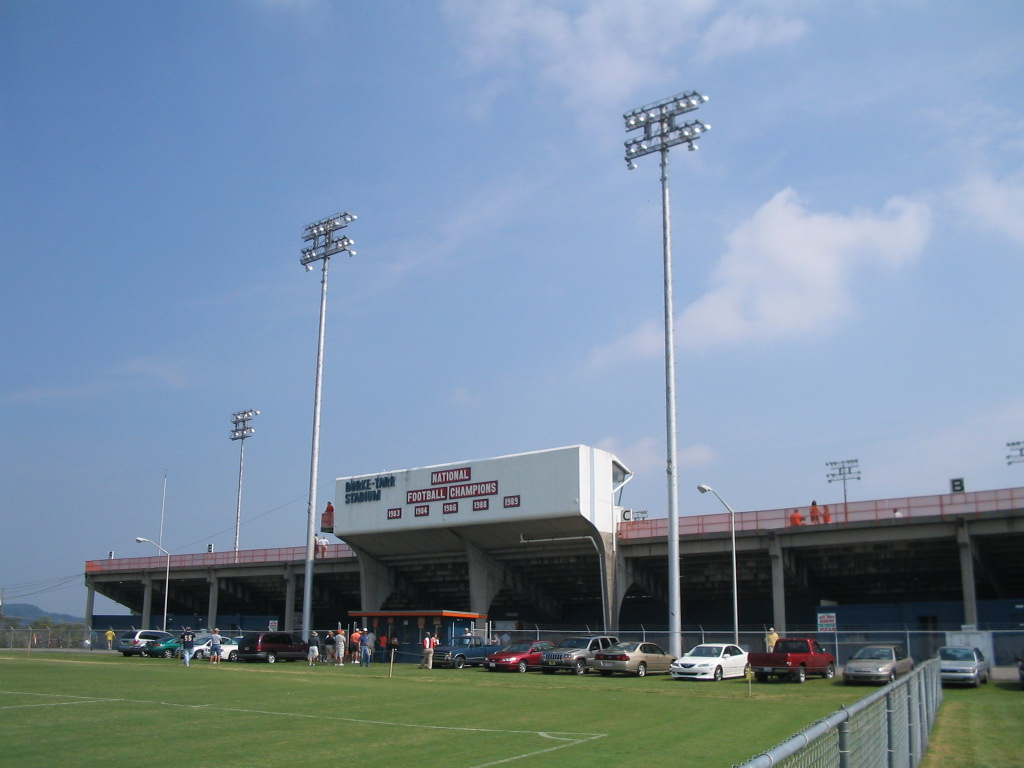
- Original Burke–Tarr Stadium adorned with years of football championships
- First season: 1895; 131 years ago
- Athletic director: Matt Pope
- Head coach: Tyler Almond; 1st season, 9–2 (.818)
- Location: Jefferson City, Tennessee
- Stadium: Burke–Tarr Stadium (capacity: 6,500)
- Field: Roy Harmon Field
- NCAA division: Division II
- Conference: South Atlantic
- Colors: Orange and blue
- All-time record: 680–369–32 (.644)

NAIA national championships
- NAIA Division I: 1983, 1984, 1986, 1988, 1989

Conference championships
- 25
- Website: cneagles.com

The Carson–Newman Eagles football team represents Carson–Newman University, located in Jefferson City, Tennessee, in NCAA Division II college football. The Eagles, who began playing football in 1895, currently compete as members of the South Atlantic Conference (SAC). Carson–Newman's home games are played at Burke–Tarr Stadium. Carson–Newman has won five national championships, all as while members of the NAIA in 1983, 1984, 1986, 1988, and 1989.

Players who went on to the NFL include Joe Fishback, Todd Collins, Leonard "Bishop" Weaver, Tim George, Clayton Holmes, Cedric Killings, David Pool, Boyce Green, Dave Ziff, and Vernon Turner.

== Conference history ==
- Smoky Mountain Conference (1927–?)
- South Atlantic Conference (1975–present)

== Championships ==
=== National championships ===
Year	Association	Division	Head coach	Record	Opponent	Result
1983	NAIA (5)	Division I (5)	Ken Sparks	10–3 (6–1 SAC)	Mesa State	W, 36–28
1984	NAIA (5)	Division I (5)	Ken Sparks	10–2–1 (6–1 SAC)	Central Arkansas	T, 19–19
1986	NAIA (5)	Division I (5)	Ken Sparks	12–1 (6–1 SAC)	Cameron	W, 17–0
1988	NAIA (5)	Division I (5)	Ken Sparks	12–2 (5–2 SAC)	Adams State	W, 56–21
1989	NAIA (5)	Division I (5)	Ken Sparks	12–1 (6–1 SAC)	Emporia State	W, 34–20

== Postseason appearances ==
=== NCAA Division II ===
The Eagles have made eighteen appearances in the NCAA Division II playoffs, with a combined record of 20–17.

Year	Round	Opponent	Result
1993	First Round	North Alabama	L, 28–38
1994	First Round	North Alabama	L, 13–17
1995	First Round; Quarterfinals	West Georgia; North Alabama	W, 37–26; L, 7–28
1996	First Round; Quarterfinals; Semifinals; National Championship	West Georgia; Valdosta State; UC Davis; Northern Colorado	W, 41–7; W, 24–19; W, 29–26; L, 14–23
1997	First Round; Quarterfinals; Semifinals	North Alabama; Albany State; Northern Colorado	W, 21–7; W, 23–22; L, 29–30
1998	First Round; Quarterfinals; Semifinals; National Championship	West Georgia; Fort Valley State; Slippery Rock; NW Missouri State	W, 30–20; W, 38–31; W, 47–21; L, 6–24
1999	First Round; Quarterfinals; Semifinals; National Championship	Arkansas Tech; Catawba; Northeastern State; NW Missouri State	W, 40–28; W, 28–25; W, 42–7; L, 52–58 ^{4OT}
2002	First Round; Quarterfinals	Fayetteville State; Valdosta State	W, 40–27; L, 28–31
2003	First Round; Quarterfinals	Valdosta State; North Alabama	W, 35–29; L, 9–41
2004	First Round; Second Round	Fayetteville State; Valdosta State	W, 35–14; L, 12–38
2008	First Round	Valdosta State	L, 20–24
2009	Second Round; Quarterfinals; Semifinals	West Alabama; North Alabama; Grand Valley State	W, 59–41; W, 24–21; L, 27–41
2012	Second Round; Quarterfinals	Lenoir–Rhyne; Valdosta State	W, 38–35; L, 26–48
2013	First Round; Second Round	Newberry; Lenoir–Rhyne	W, 37–27; L, 20–27
2015	First Round	Valdosta State	L, 59–61
2019	First Round; Second Round	Bowie State; Lenoir–Rhyne	W, 17–9; L, 21–49
2024	First Round	Miles	L, 13–14
2026	First Round	Kentucky State	TBP

=== NAIA ===
Carson–Newman made eleven appearances in the NAIA playoffs, with a combined record of 20–5–1 and five national championships.

Year	Round	Opponent	Result
1972	Semifinals; National Championship	Livington; East Texas State	W, 7–7; L, 18–21
1982	Quarterfinals	Hillsdale	L, 12–20
1983	Quarterfinals; Semifinals; National Championship	Shepherd; Saginaw Valley State; Mesa	W, 42–21; W, 41–7; W, 36–28
1984	Quarterfinals; Semifinals; National Championship	Concord; Saginaw Valley State; Central Arkansas	W, 42–6; W, 24–21; T, 19–19
1986	Quarterfinals; Semifinals; National Championship	Shepherd; Hillsdale; Cameron	W, 30–10; W, 19–16 ^{OT} W, 17–0
1987	First Round; Quarterfinals; Semifinals; National Championship	Central State (OH); Gardner–Webb; Mesa; Cameron	W, 26–13; W, 27–24; W, 21–7; L, 2–30
1988	First Round; Quarterfinals; Semifinals; National Championship	Concord; Moorhead State; Central State (OH); Adams State	W, 62–29; W, 42–6; W, 13–0; W, 56–21
1989	Quarterfinals; Semifinals; National Championship	West Virginia Tech; Central State (OH); Emporia State	W, 51–13; W, 20–17; W, 34–20
1990	Quarterfinals; Semifinals	Southwest State; Central State (OH)	W, 35–6; L, 14–41
1991	Quarterfinals	Western State (CO)	L, 21–38
1992	Quarterfinals	Shepherd	L, 3–6
