= 2012 Lenoir–Rhyne Bears football team =

American college football season

2012 Lenoir–Rhyne Bears football

SAC champion

NCAA Division II Second Round, L 35–38 vs. Carson–Newman
- Conference: South Atlantic Conference
- Record: 9–3 (6–1 SAC)
- Head coach: Mike Houston (2nd season)
- Offensive coordinator: Brent Thompson (3rd season)
- Home stadium: Moretz Stadium

2012 South Atlantic Conference football standings
	Conf.			Overall
Team	W		L	W		L
No. 20 Lenoir–Rhyne $^	6	–	1	9	–	3
No. 13 Carson–Newman ^	5	–	2	9	–	3
Mars Hill	5	–	2	6	–	4
Wingate	5	–	2	6	–	5
Newberry	3	–	4	5	–	6
Catawba	2	–	5	4	–	7
Brevard	1	–	6	2	–	9
Tusculum	1	–	6	2	–	9
$ – Conference champion; ^ – NCAA Division II playoff participant; Rankings from AFCA Poll

The 2012 Lenoir–Rhyne Bears football team represented Lenoir–Rhyne University in the 2012 NCAA Division II football season. They were led by second-year head coach Mike Houston and played their home games at Moretz Stadium. They were a member of the South Atlantic Conference.

== Schedule ==
Date	Time	Opponent	Site	Result	Attendance
September 1	7:45 pm	at Concord*	Callaghan Stadium; Athens, WV	L 21–24	1,242
September 8	7:00 pm	Davidson*	Moretz Stadium; Hickory, NC	W 20–2	6,469
September 15	1:00 pm	at Carson–Newman	Burke-Tarr Stadium; Jefferson City, TN	L 23–47	3,723
September 29	7:00 pm	North Greenville*	Moretz Stadium; Hickory, NC	W 52–10	6,196
October 6	1:00 pm	at Brevard	Brevard Memorial Stadium; Brevard, NC	W 34–6	
October 13	2:00 pm	Tusculum^{†}	Moretz Stadium; Hickory, NC	W 51–6	7,981
October 20	2:00 pm	Mars Hill	Moretz Stadium; Hickory, NC	W 34–21	5,397
October 27	1:30 pm	at Wingate	Irwin Belk Stadium; Wingate, NC	W 44–13	3,917
November 3	2:00 pm	at Newberry	Setzler Field; Newberry, SC	W 44–21	2,643
November 10	2:00 pm	Catawba	Moretz Stadium; Hickory, NC	W 44–14	8,026
November 17	12:00 pm	Fort Valley State*	Moretz Stadium; Hickory, NC (NCAA Division II First Round)	W 21–6	2,720
November 24	12:00 pm	at Carson–Newman	Burke-Tarr Stadium; Jefferson City, TN (NCAA Division II Second Round)	L 35–38	1,654
*Non-conference game; ^{†}Homecoming; All times are in Eastern time
