= 1989 Carson–Newman Eagles football team =

American college football season

1989 Carson–Newman Eagles football

NAIA Division I national champion SAC champion

Champion Bowl, W 34–20 vs. Emporia State
- Conference: South Atlantic Conference
- Record: 12–1 (6–1 SAC)
- Head coach: Ken Sparks (10th season)
- Home stadium: Burke–Tarr Stadium

1989 South Atlantic Conference football standings
	Conf.					Overall
Team	W		L		T	W		L		T
No. 4 Carson–Newman $^	6	–	1	–	0	12	–	1	–	0
No. 16 Gardner–Webb	4	–	3	–	0	7	–	4	–	0
Mars Hill	4	–	3	–	0	5	–	5	–	0
Lenoir–Rhyne	4	–	3	–	0	5	–	6	–	0
Catawba	4	–	3	–	0	4	–	7	–	0
Presbyterian	3	–	4	–	0	4	–	7	–	0
Wingate	2	–	5	–	0	5	–	5	–	0
Elon	1	–	6	–	0	1	–	9	–	0
$ – Conference champion; ^ – NAIA Division I playoff participant; Rankings from NAIA Division I poll

The 1989 Carson–Newman Eagles football team was an American football team that represented Carson–Newman College (renamed Carson–Newman University in 2012) as a member of the South Atlantic Conference (SAC) during the 1989 NAIA Division I football season. In its tenth year under head coach Ken Sparks, the team compiled a 12–1 record (6–1 against conference opponents) and won the SAC championship.

The Eagles advanced to the NAIA playoffs, defeating West Virginia Tech in the quarterfinals and Central State (OH) in the semifinals. They faced Emporia State in the Champion Bowl, winning by a 34–20 score to win the NAIA national championship. It was the fifth of five national championships won by Carson–Newman in seven years (1983, 1984, 1986, 1988, and 1989).

After the season, Sparks was chosen as the SAC Coach of the Year, the fourth time he won the award. In addition, Carson–Newman strong safety Joe Fishback was named SAC Defensive Player of the Year, and free safety Chuck Proffitt was named SAC Freshman of the Year. Seven Carson–Newman players received first-team honors on the All-SAC team: running back Vernon Turner; offensive linemen Kelly Rasnic and Paige Belcher; place-kicker Rick Wetsel; defensive lineman John Mefford; and defensive backs Joe Fishback and David Pool.

== Schedule ==
Date	Opponent	Site	Result	Attendance	Source
September 2	at Fairmont State*	Duvall-Rosier Field; Fairmont, WV	W 44–0		
September 9	Hillsdale*	Burke–Tarr Stadium; Jefferson City, TN	W 40–16	4,167	
September 16	at Wingate	Wingate, NC	W 28–3		
September 23	Elon	Burke–Tarr Stadium; Jefferson City, TN	W 17–0	4,003	
September 30	Catawba	Burke–Tarr Stadium; Jefferson City, TN	W 24–10	3,343	
October 7	Newberry*	Burke–Tarr Stadium; Jefferson City, TN	W 45–24	4,259	
October 14	Mars Hill	Burke–Tarr Stadium; Jefferson City, TN	L 14–17		
October 21	at Gardner–Webb	Ernest W. Spangler Stadium; Boiling Springs, NC	W 23–20 ^{OT}		
October 28	Lenoir–Rhyne	Burke–Tarr Stadium; Jefferson City, TN	W 38–0	4,739	
November 11	at Presbyterian	Bailey Stadium; Clinton, SC	W 43–21	3,200	
December 2	at West Virginia Tech*	Laidley Field; Charleston, WV (NAIA Division I quarterfinal)	W 51–13		
December 9	Central State (OH)*	Burke–Tarr Stadium; Jefferson City, TN (NAIA Division I semifinal)	W 20–17	3,254	
December 16	Emporia State*	Burke–Tarr Stadium; Jefferson City, TN (Champion Bowl)	W 34–20	4,483	
*Non-conference game
