= Mountcastle =

Mountcastle may refer to:

== Places ==
- Mountcastle, Edinburgh, a suburb of the Scottish city
- Mountcastle, County Tyrone, a townland in County Tyrone, Northern Ireland
- Mountcastle, Virginia, an unincorporated community in New Kent County, Virginia
- Mountcastle, Dublin, hamlet which is now incorporated into the Irish capital city

== People ==
- Clara Mountcastle (1837–1908), Canadian author and artist
- Robert Edward Lee Mountcastle (1865–1913), American lawyer and politician
- Ryan Mountcastle (born 1997), American baseball player
- Vernon Benjamin Mountcastle (1918–2015), neuroscientist from the Johns Hopkins University

== See also ==
- Duke of Abercorn, the 6th earl was also created Baron Mountcastle and Viscount Strabane, in the Peerage of Ireland
