= 1988 NAIA Division I football season =

American college football season

- Regular season: August–November 1988
- Postseason: November 26–December 17, 1988
- National Championship: Burke–Tarr Stadium; Jefferson City, TN
- Champions: Carson–Newman (4)

The 1988 NAIA Division I football season was the 33rd season of college football sponsored by the NAIA, was the 19th season of play of the NAIA's top division for football.

The season was played from August to November 1988 and culminated in the 1988 NAIA Champion Bowl playoffs and the 1988 NAIA Champion Bowl, played this year on December 17, 1988 at Burke–Tarr Stadium in Jefferson City, Tennessee, on the campus of Carson–Newman College.

Carson–Newman defeated Adams State in the Champion Bowl, 56–21, to win their fourth NAIA national title. It was the Eagles' third straight appearance in the Champion Bowl, going 1–1 in the previous two.

== Conference standings ==
1988 Arkansas Intercollegiate Conference football standings
	Conf.					Overall
Team	W		L		T	W		L		T
No. 1 Central Arkansas $^	6	–	0	–	0	10	–	1	–	0
No. 7 Arkansas–Monticello ^	5	–	1	–	0	10	–	2	–	0
No. 17 Arkansas Tech	3	–	3	–	0	6	–	4	–	0
Henderson State	2	–	3	–	1	4	–	5	–	1
Ouachita Baptist	2	–	3	–	1	4	–	5	–	1
Harding	1	–	5	–	0	4	–	6	–	0
Southern Arkansas	1	–	5	–	0	1	–	9	–	0
$ – Conference champion; ^ – NAIA Division I playoff participant; Rankings from NAIA Division I poll

1988 Central States Intercollegiate Conference football standings
	Conf.					Overall
Team	W		L		T	W		L		T
No. 2 Pittsburg State $^	7	–	0	–	0	11	–	1	–	0
No. 11 Emporia State ^	5	–	2	–	0	8	–	3	–	0
No. 14 Washburn ^	5	–	2	–	0	7	–	4	–	0
No. 24 Kearney State	4	–	3	–	0	6	–	5	–	0
Fort Hays State	3	–	4	–	0	3	–	6	–	1
Missouri Western	2	–	5	–	0	5	–	6	–	0
Missouri Southern	2	–	5	–	0	3	–	7	–	0
Wayne State (NE)	0	–	7	–	0	0	–	11	–	0
$ – Conference champion; ^ – NAIA Division I playoff participant; Rankings from NAIA Division I poll

1988 Great Lakes Intercollegiate Athletic Conference football standings
	Conf.					Overall
Team	W		L		T	W		L		T
No. 5 Hillsdale $^	5	–	0	–	0	10	–	2	–	0
No. 19 Northern Michigan	4	–	1	–	0	8	–	3	–	0
Grand Valley State	3	–	2	–	0	7	–	4	–	0
No. 25 Saginaw Valley State	2	–	3	–	0	4	–	5	–	0
Ferris State	1	–	4	–	0	4	–	7	–	0
Wayne State (MI)	0	–	5	–	0	2	–	8	–	0
$ – Conference champion; ^ – NAIA Division I playoff participant; Rankings from NCAA Division II Football Committee poll for Northern Michigan and NAIA Division I poll for Hillsdale and Saginaw Valley State

1988 Lone Star Conference football standings
	Conf.					Overall
Team	W		L		T	W		L		T
No. 3 Texas A&I $^	6	–	1	–	0	10	–	3	–	0
No. 15 East Texas State	5	–	2	–	0	8	–	3	–	0
Angelo State	5	–	2	–	0	6	–	4	–	0
No. 18 Cameron	4	–	3	–	0	5	–	3	–	1
Central State (OK)	4	–	3	–	0	4	–	5	–	0
Abilene Christian	3	–	4	–	0	3	–	7	–	0
West Texas State	1	–	6	–	0	2	–	8	–	0
Eastern New Mexico	0	–	6	–	0	2	–	8	–	0
$ – Conference champion; ^ – NCAA Division II playoff participant; Rankings from NCAA Division II Football Committee poll for Texas A&I and East Texas State and NAIA Division I poll for Cameron

1988 Northern Intercollegiate Conference football standings
	Conf.					Overall
Team	W		L		T	W		L		T
No. 12 Moorhead State $^	6	–	0	–	0	9	–	3	–	0
No. 15 Northern State ^	5	–	1	–	0	8	–	4	–	0
Minnesota Duluth	4	–	2	–	0	7	–	4	–	0
Minnesota Morris	3	–	3	–	0	4	–	6	–	0
Southwest State (MN)	2	–	4	–	0	4	–	6	–	0
Winona State	1	–	5	–	0	3	–	8	–	0
Bemidji State	0	–	6	–	0	1	–	9	–	0
$ – Conference champion; ^ – NAIA Division I playoff participant; Rankings from NAIA Division I poll

1988 Oklahoma Intercollegiate Conference football standings
	Conf.					Overall
Team	W		L		T	W		L		T
No. 4 SE Oklahoma State $^	4	–	0	–	0	10	–	1	–	0
No. 21 SW Oklahoma State	2	–	2	–	0	6	–	4	–	0
East Central	2	–	2	–	0	4	–	6	–	0
Northeastern State	2	–	2	–	0	4	–	6	–	0
NW Oklahoma State	0	–	4	–	0	4	–	6	–	0
$ – Conference champion; ^ – NAIA Division I playoff participant; Rankings from NAIA Division I pol

1988 Rocky Mountain Athletic Conference football standings
	Conf.					Overall
Team	W		L		T	W		L		T
No. 3 Mesa State $^	5	–	0	–	0	8	–	2	–	0
No. 16 Adams State ^	3	–	1	–	1	10	–	3	–	1
No. 23 Western New Mexico	2	–	2	–	1	4	–	4	–	1
Western State (CO)	2	–	3	–	0	4	–	5	–	0
Colorado Mines	2	–	3	–	0	3	–	7	–	0
Fort Lewis	0	–	5	–	0	1	–	8	–	0
$ – Conference champion; ^ – NAIA Division I playoff participant; Rankings from NAIA Division I poll

1988 South Atlantic Conference football standings
	Conf.					Overall
Team	W		L		T	W		L		T
No. 8 Carson–Newman +^	5	–	2	–	0	12	–	2	–	0
No. 13 Catawba +^	5	–	2	–	0	8	–	4	–	0
No. 20 Lenoir–Rhyne +	5	–	2	–	0	6	–	5	–	0
No. 22 Elon	4	–	3	–	0	6	–	5	–	0
Mars Hill	4	–	3	–	0	5	–	5	–	0
Gardner–Webb	2	–	5	–	0	4	–	6	–	1
Newberry	2	–	5	–	0	3	–	8	–	0
Presbyterian	1	–	6	–	0	3	–	8	–	0
+ – Conference co-champions; ^ – NAIA Division I playoff participant; Rankings from NAIA Division I poll

1988 West Virginia Intercollegiate Athletic Conference football standings
	Conf.					Overall
Team	W		L		T	W		L		T
No. 10 Fairmont State +^	5	–	0	–	2	7	–	2	–	2
No. 19 Shepherd +	6	–	1	–	0	6	–	4	–	0
No. 9 Concord ^	5	–	1	–	1	7	–	2	–	1
West Virginia State	3	–	3	–	1	4	–	5	–	1
West Liberty State	2	–	5	–	0	4	–	6	–	0
Glenville State	2	–	5	–	0	3	–	7	–	0
Salem	2	–	5	–	0	2	–	8	–	0
West Virginia Tech	1	–	6	–	0	2	–	8	–	0
+ – Conference co-champions; ^ – NAIA Division I playoff participant; Rankings from NAIA Division I poll

1988 NAIA Division I independents football records
	Conf.			Overall
Team	W	L	T	W		L		T
No. 6 Central State (OH) ^		–		11	–	2	–	0
West Virginia Wesleyan		–		6	–	4	–	0
Arkansas–Pine Bluff		–		4	–	6	–	1
Langston		–		2	–	7	–	0
Guilford		–		2	–	8	–	0
^ – NAIA Division I playoff participant; Rankings from NAIA Division I poll

== Conference champions ==
Conference	Champion	Record
Arkansas Intercollegiate	Central Arkansas	6–0
NIC	Moorhead State (MN)	6–0
Oklahoma	Southeastern Oklahoma State	4–0
RMAC	Mesa State	5–0
South Atlantic	Carson–Newman; Catawba	5–2
WVIAC	Fairmont State	5–0–2

== Rankings ==
Final NAIA Division I poll rankings:

Rank	Team (first place votes)	Record (thru Nov. 19)	Points
1	Central Arkansas (15)	10–0	375
2	Pittsburg State	9–0	350
3	Mesa State	8–1	343
4	Southeastern Oklahoma State	9–0	324
5	Hillsdale	9–1	313
6	Central State (OH)	9–1	306
7	Arkansas–Monticello	9–1	287
8	Carson–Newman	8–2	259
9	Concord	7–1–1	248
10	Fairmont State	7–1–2	238
11	Emporia State	8–2	218
12	Moorhead State	8–2	206
13	Catawba	8–3	200
14	Washburn	7–3	179
15	Northern State	8–3	162
16	Adams State	7–2–1	153
17	Arkansas Tech	6–4	126
18	Cameron	5–3–1	122
19	Shepherd	6–4	98
20	Lenoir–Rhyne	6–5	93
21	Southwestern Oklahoma State	6–4	84
22	Elon	6–5	55
23	Western New Mexico	7–2–1	79
24	Kearney State	4–4–1	43
25	Saginaw Valley State	4–5	15

== Postseason ==
First Round; November 26, 1988; Campus sites
Washburn	13
Arkansas–Monticello*	20
Northern State	14
Pittsburg State*	38
Adams State	14
Emporia State*	10
Central Arkansas	14
SE Oklahoma State* (OT)	21
Mesa State	16
Moorhead State*	26
Concord	29
Carson–Newman*	62
Catawba	10
Central State (OH)*	24
Fairmont State	7
Hillsdale*	24

Quarterfinals; December 3, 1988; Campus sites
Arkansas–Monticello	7
Pittsburg State*	23
Adams State	38
SE Oklahoma State*	7
Moorhead State	6
Carson–Newman*	42
Central State (OH)	14
Hillsdale*	7

Semifinals; December 10, 1988; Campus sites
Pittsburg State	10
Adams State*	13
Carson–Newman	13
Central State (OH)*	0

1988 Champion Bowl; December 17, 1988; Jefferson City, TN
Adams State	21
Carson–Newman*	56

== See also ==
- 1988 NAIA Division II football season
- 1988 NCAA Division I-A football season
- 1988 NCAA Division I-AA football season
- 1988 NCAA Division II football season
- 1988 NCAA Division III football season
