= 1988 college football season =

The 1988 college football season may refer to:

- 1988 NCAA Division I-A football season
- 1988 NCAA Division I-AA football season
- 1988 NCAA Division II football season
- 1988 NCAA Division III football season
- 1988 NAIA Division I football season
- 1988 NAIA Division II football season
