= 1989 NAIA Division I football season =

American college football season

- Regular season: August–November 1989
- Postseason: December 2–16, 1989
- National Championship: Burke–Tarr Stadium; Jefferson City, TN
- Champions: Carson–Newman (5)

The 1989 NAIA Division I football season was the 34th season of college football sponsored by the NAIA, was the 20th season of play of the NAIA's top division for football.

The season was played from August to November 1989 and culminated in the 1989 NAIA Champion Bowl playoffs and the 1989 NAIA Champion Bowl, played this year on December 16, 1989 again at Burke–Tarr Stadium in Jefferson City, Tennessee, on the campus of Carson–Newman College.

Carson–Newman defeated Emporia State in the Champion Bowl, 34–20, to win their fifth, and second consecutive, NAIA national title. It was the Eagles' fourth straight appearance in the Champion Bowl, going 2–1 in the previous two.

== Conference realignment ==
=== Membership changes ===
Team	1988 conference	1989 conference
All teams	GLIAC (NAIA)	GLIAC (NCAA D-II)
Newberry	South Atlantic	Independent
Wingate	Independent	South Atlantic

== Conference standings ==
1989 Arkansas Intercollegiate Conference football standings
	Conf.					Overall
Team	W		L		T	W		L		T
No. 3 Central Arkansas +	5	–	1	–	0	9	–	1	–	0
No. 9 Harding +^	5	–	1	–	0	7	–	4	–	0
No. 15 Henderson State	4	–	2	–	0	8	–	3	–	0
No. 18 Arkansas Tech	3	–	3	–	0	6	–	3	–	0
No. 20 Ouachita Baptist	2	–	4	–	0	5	–	5	–	0
Arkansas–Monticello	1	–	5	–	0	4	–	6	–	0
Southern Arkansas	1	–	5	–	0	3	–	6	–	1
+ – Conference co-champions; ^ – NAIA Division I playoff participant; Rankings from NAIA Division I poll

1989 Central States Intercollegiate Conference football standings
	Conf.					Overall
Team	W		L		T	W		L		T
No. 6 Emporia State $^	3	–	0	–	0	11	–	2	–	0
Fort Hays State	2	–	1	–	0	3	–	7	–	0
Kearney State	1	–	2	–	0	3	–	6	–	0
Wayne State (NE)	0	–	3	–	0	4	–	7	–	0
$ – Conference champion; ^ – NAIA Division I playoff participant; Rankings from NAIA Division I poll

1989 Northern Intercollegiate Conference football standings
	Conf.					Overall
Team	W		L		T	W		L		T
No. 14 Moorhead State $^	5	–	1	–	0	6	–	4	–	0
No. 12 Northern State	4	–	2	–	0	8	–	2	–	0
Southwest State (MN)	4	–	2	–	0	5	–	5	–	0
No. 19 Minnesota Morris	3	–	3	–	0	6	–	4	–	0
Minnesota Duluth	3	–	3	–	0	5	–	5	–	0
Bemidji State	2	–	4	–	0	4	–	5	–	0
Winona State	0	–	6	–	0	1	–	9	–	0
$ – Conference champion; ^ – NAIA Division I playoff participant; Rankings from NAIA Division I poll

1989 Oklahoma Intercollegiate Conference football standings
	Conf.					Overall
Team	W		L		T	W		L		T
No. 7 SE Oklahoma State +	3	–	1	–	0	8	–	1	–	2
No. 13 NW Oklahoma State +^	3	–	1	–	0	7	–	4	–	0
SW Oklahoma State	2	–	2	–	0	6	–	4	–	0
East Central	1	–	3	–	0	2	–	8	–	0
Northeastern State	1	–	3	–	0	2	–	8	–	0
+ – Conference co-champions; ^ – NAIA Division I playoff participant East Central forfeited a win over SW Oklahoma State.; Rankings from NAIA Division I poll

1989 Rocky Mountain Athletic Conference football standings
	Conf.					Overall
Team	W		L		T	W		L		T
No. 1 Adams State $^	7	–	0	–	0	9	–	2	–	0
No. 5 Mesa State	6	–	1	–	0	9	–	1	–	0
No. 17 Western New Mexico	5	–	2	–	0	7	–	4	–	0
Western State (CO)	2	–	5	–	0	3	–	7	–	0
Colorado Mines	1	–	6	–	0	3	–	7	–	0
Fort Lewis	1	–	6	–	0	1	–	9	–	0
Chadron State *†	0	–	0	–	0	8	–	2	–	0
Kearney State *	0	–	0	–	0	4	–	6	–	0
Wayne State (NE) *	0	–	0	–	0	4	–	7	–	0
Fort Hays State *	0	–	0	–	0	3	–	7	–	0
$ – Conference champion; ^ – NAIA Division I playoff participant † – NAIA Division II playoff participant * – ineligible for conference title; Rankings from NAIA Division I poll

1989 South Atlantic Conference football standings
	Conf.					Overall
Team	W		L		T	W		L		T
No. 4 Carson–Newman $^	6	–	1	–	0	12	–	1	–	0
No. 16 Gardner–Webb	4	–	3	–	0	7	–	4	–	0
Mars Hill	4	–	3	–	0	5	–	5	–	0
Lenoir–Rhyne	4	–	3	–	0	5	–	6	–	0
Catawba	4	–	3	–	0	4	–	7	–	0
Presbyterian	3	–	4	–	0	4	–	7	–	0
Wingate	2	–	5	–	0	5	–	5	–	0
Elon	1	–	6	–	0	1	–	9	–	0
$ – Conference champion; ^ – NAIA Division I playoff participant; Rankings from NAIA Division I poll

1989 West Virginia Intercollegiate Athletic Conference football standings
	Conf.					Overall
Team	W		L		T	W		L		T
No. 11 Concord +	5	–	0	–	1	7	–	2	–	1
No. 10 West Virginia Tech +^	5	–	0	–	1	7	–	3	–	1
West Liberty State	3	–	3	–	0	4	–	6	–	0
West Virginia State	3	–	3	–	0	3	–	7	–	0
Fairmont State	2	–	4	–	0	4	–	6	–	0
Shepherd	2	–	4	–	0	3	–	7	–	0
Glenville State	0	–	6	–	0	1	–	8	–	0
+ – Conference co-champions; ^ – NAIA Division I playoff participant; Rankings from NAIA Division I poll

1989 NAIA Division I independents football records
	Conf.			Overall
Team	W	L	T	W		L		T
No. 2 Central State (OH) ^		–		10	–	3	–	0
No. 8 Arkansas–Pine Bluff		–		7	–	2	–	1
West Virginia Wesleyan		–		7	–	3	–	0
Langston		–		4	–	6	–	0
Guilford		–		2	–	7	–	1
^ – NAIA Division I playoff participant; Rankings from NAIA Division I poll

== Conference champions ==
Conference	Champion	Record
Arkansas	Central Arkansas; Harding	5–1
NIC	Moorhead State (MN)	5–1
Oklahoma	Northwestern Oklahoma State; Southeastern Oklahoma State	3–1
RMAC	Adams State	7–0
South Atlantic	Carson–Newman	6–1
WVIAC	West Virginia Tech; Concord (WV)	5–0–1

== Rankings ==
Final NAIA Division I poll rankings:

Rank	Team (first place votes)	Record (thru Nov. 19)	Points
1	Adams State (4)	8–1	237
2	Central State (OH) (4)	9–2	235
3	Central Arkansas (2)	9–1	231
4	Carson–Newman (3)	9–1	229
5	Mesa State	9–1	209
6	Emporia State	9–1	197
7	Southeastern Oklahoma State	7–1–2	182
8	Arkansas–Pine Bluff	7–2–1	157
9	Harding	7–3	151
10	West Virginia Tech	7–2–1	136
11	Concord	7–2–1	126
12	Northern State	8–2	119
13	Northwestern Oklahoma State	7–3	103
14	Moorhead State	6–3	95
15	Henderson State	7–4	77
16	Gardner–Webb	7–4	73
17	Western New Mexico	7–4	62
18	Arkansas Tech	6–3	46
19	Minnesota Morris	6–4	42
20	Ouachita Baptist	5–5	15

== Postseason ==
Quarterfinals; December 2, 1989; Campus sites
Harding	9
Emporia State*	32
NW Oklahoma State	22
Adams State*	30
Central State (OH)	56
Moorhead State*	7
Carson–Newman	51
West Virginia Tech*	13

Semifinals; December 9, 1989; Campus sites
Emporia State	51
Adams State*	44
Central State (OH)	17
Carson–Newman*	20

1989 Champion Bowl; December 16, 1989; Jefferson City, TN
Emporia State	20
Carson–Newman*	34

== See also ==
- 1989 NCAA Division I-A football season
- 1989 NCAA Division I-AA football season
- 1989 NCAA Division II football season
- 1989 NCAA Division III football season
