= 1989 Central State Marauders football team =

American college football season

1989 Central State Marauders football

Black college national champion

NAIA Division I Semifinal, L 17–20 vs. Carson–Newman
- Conference: Independent
- Record: 10–3
- Head coach: Billy Joe (9th season)
- Home stadium: McPherson Stadium

1989 NAIA Division I independents football records
	Conf.			Overall
Team	W	L	T	W		L		T
No. 2 Central State (OH) ^		–		10	–	3	–	0
No. 8 Arkansas–Pine Bluff		–		7	–	2	–	1
West Virginia Wesleyan		–		7	–	3	–	0
Langston		–		4	–	6	–	0
Guilford		–		2	–	7	–	1
^ – NAIA Division I playoff participant; Rankings from NAIA Division I poll

The 1989 Central State Marauders football team represented Central State University as an independent during the 1989 NAIA Division I football season. Led by ninth-year head coach Billy Joe, the Marauders compiled an overall record of 10–3. At the conclusion of the season, the Marauders were also recognized as black college national champion.

== Schedule ==
Date	Opponent	Site	Result	Attendance	Source
September 2	Urbana	McPherson Stadium; Wilberforce, OH	W 63–0	3,500	
September 9	at Illinois State	Hancock Stadium; Normal, IL	L 9–10	7,489	
September 15	vs. Tennessee State	Municipal Stadium; Cleveland, OH (Cosby Cleveland Classic)	L 13–14	8,078	
September 23	vs. West Virginia State	Cooper Stadium; Columbus, OH (Martin Luther King Bowl)	W 64–0	8,500	
September 30	Arkansas–Pine Bluff	McPherson Stadium; Wilberforce, OH	W 57–0		
October 7	at Northeast Missouri State	Stokes Stadium; Kirksville, MO	W 50–0		
October 14	at Kentucky State	Alumni Field; Frankfort, KY	W 46–0	794	
October 21	at Fort Valley State	Wildcat Stadium; Fort Valley, GA	W 36–18		
October 28	Lane^{†}	McPherson Stadium; Wilberforce, OH	W 101–0	5,000	
November 4	Northern Michigan	McPherson Stadium; Wilberforce, OH	W 78–0	3,500	
November 11	Anderson (IN)	McPherson Stadium; Wilberforce, OH	W 77–27	2,500	
December 2	at Moorhead State	Alex Nemzek Stadium; Moorhead, MN (NAIA Division I Quarterfinal)	W 56–7		
December 9	at Carson–Newman	Burke–Tarr Stadium; Jefferson City, TN (NAIA Division I Semifinal)	L 17–20	3,254	
^{†}Homecoming
