= Henry VanSant =

American football player and coach (1935–2006)

Biographical details
- Born: June 6, 1935; Hampton, Virginia, U.S.
- Died: March 16, 2006 (aged 70); Fayetteville, North Carolina, U.S.

Playing career
- 1957–1960: East Carolina

Coaching career (HC unless noted)
- 1962–1970: East Carolina (assistant)
- 1973: Guilford
- 1979: East Carolina (assistant)
- 1980–1983: Lenoir–Rhyne

Administrative career (AD unless noted)
- 1985–1987: East Carolina (assistant AD)
- 1987–2001: East Carolina (associate AD)

Head coaching record
- Overall: 18–36–1

Henry Charles VanSant (June 6, 1935 – March 16, 2006) was an American college football player and coach. He played at East Carolina University and later served as an assistant football coach and assistant athletic director there.

Van Sant served as the head football coach at Guilford College in Greensboro, North Carolina in 1973. He later served as the head football coach at Lenoir–Rhyne College in Hickory, North Carolina from 1980 to 1983.

== Head coaching record ==
Year	Team	Overall	Conference	Standing	Bowl/playoffs
Guilford Quakers (Carolinas Conference) (1973)
1973	Guilford	1–9	0–3	5th	
Guilford:		1–9	0–3		
Lenoir–Rhyne Bears (SAC-8) (1980–1983)
1980	Lenoir–Rhyne	4–7	3–4	T–4th	
1981	Lenoir–Rhyne	2–9	2–5	T–7th	
1982	Lenoir–Rhyne	5–5–1	3–3–1	5th	
1983	Lenoir–Rhyne	4–6	2–5	7th	
Lenoir–Rhyne:		17–27–1	10–17–1		
Total:		18–36–1			
