= 1986 NAIA Division I football season =

American college football season

- Regular season: August–November 1986
- Postseason: December 6–20, 1986
- National Championship: Burke–Tarr Stadium; Jefferson City, TN
- Champions: Carson–Newman (3)

The 1986 NAIA Division I football season was the 31st season of college football sponsored by the NAIA, was the 17th season of play of the NAIA's top division for football.

The season was played from August to November 1986 and culminated in the 1986 NAIA Champion Bowl, played this year on December 20, 1986 at Burke–Tarr Stadium in Jefferson City, Tennessee, on the campus of Carson–Newman College.

Carson–Newman defeated Cameron in the Champion Bowl, 17–0, to win their third NAIA national title.

== Conference standings ==
1986 Arkansas Intercollegiate Conference football standings
| | Conf. | | | | | Overall |
| Team | W | | L | | T | W | | L | | T |
|---|---|---|---|---|---|---|---|---|---|---|
| No. 4 Central Arkansas $^ | 7 | – | 0 | – | 0 | 9 | – | 2 | – | 0 |
| No. 20 Arkansas–Monticello | 5 | – | 2 | – | 0 | 6 | – | 3 | – | 0 |
| Arkansas Tech | 5 | – | 2 | – | 0 | 6 | – | 4 | – | 0 |
| Ouachita Baptist | 3 | – | 3 | – | 1 | 5 | – | 4 | – | 1 |
| Harding | 3 | – | 4 | – | 0 | 4 | – | 5 | – | 1 |
| Henderson State | 2 | – | 4 | – | 1 | 2 | – | 7 | – | 1 |
| Southern Arkansas | 2 | – | 5 | – | 0 | 4 | – | 7 | – | 0 |
| Arkansas–Pine Bluff | 0 | – | 7 | – | 0 | 1 | – | 9 | – | 0 |
$ – Conference champion; ^ – NAIA Division I playoff participant; Rankings from NAIA Division I poll

1986 Central States Intercollegiate Conference football standings
| | Conf. | | | | | Overall |
| Team | W | | L | | T | W | | L | | T |
|---|---|---|---|---|---|---|---|---|---|---|
| No. 1 Pittsburg State $^ | 7 | – | 0 | – | 0 | 11 | – | 1 | – | 0 |
| No. 6 Emporia State | 5 | – | 2 | – | 0 | 8 | – | 2 | – | 0 |
| No. 8 Washburn ^ | 5 | – | 2 | – | 0 | 8 | – | 3 | – | 0 |
| Kearney State | 5 | – | 2 | – | 0 | 5 | – | 4 | – | 0 |
| Fort Hays State | 2 | – | 5 | – | 0 | 4 | – | 6 | – | 0 |
| Missouri Western | 2 | – | 5 | – | 0 | 3 | – | 8 | – | 0 |
| Missouri Southern | 2 | – | 5 | – | 0 | 2 | – | 7 | – | 0 |
| Wayne State (NE) | 0 | – | 7 | – | 0 | 2 | – | 9 | – | 0 |
$ – Conference champion; ^ – NAIA Division I playoff participant; Rankings from NAIA Division I poll

1986 Columbia Football League standings
| | Conf. | | | | | Overall |
| Team | W | | L | | T | W | | L | | T |
|---|---|---|---|---|---|---|---|---|---|---|
Northern Division
| No. 5 Pacific Lutheran x^ | 6 | – | 0 | – | 0 | 8 | – | 1 | – | 0 |
| No. 19 Central Washington | 4 | – | 2 | – | 0 | 6 | – | 3 | – | 0 |
| Puget Sound | 4 | – | 2 | – | 0 | 6 | – | 3 | – | 0 |
| No. 18 Simon Fraser | 4 | – | 2 | – | 0 | 6 | – | 3 | – | 0 |
| Whitworth | 1 | – | 4 | – | 1 | 2 | – | 6 | – | 1 |
| Western Washington | 1 | – | 5 | – | 0 | 2 | – | 7 | – | 0 |
| Eastern Oregon | 0 | – | 5 | – | 1 | 0 | – | 8 | – | 1 |
Southern Division
| No. 1 Linfield x^ | 6 | – | 0 | – | 0 | 12 | – | 0 | – | 0 |
| No. 13 Western Oregon | 5 | – | 1 | – | 0 | 7 | – | 2 | – | 0 |
| Oregon Tech | 4 | – | 2 | – | 0 | 5 | – | 4 | – | 0 |
| Southern Oregon | 2 | – | 4 | – | 0 | 4 | – | 5 | – | 0 |
| Willamette | 2 | – | 4 | – | 0 | 4 | – | 5 | – | 0 |
| Pacific (OR) | 1 | – | 5 | – | 0 | 2 | – | 7 | – | 0 |
| Lewis & Clark | 1 | – | 5 | – | 0 | 1 | – | 8 | – | 0 |
x – Division champion/co-champions; ^ – NAIA Division II playoff participant; Rankings from NAIA Division I poll for Central Washington, Simon Fraser, and Western Oregon and NAIA Division II poll for Pacific Lutheran and Linfield

1986 Great Lakes Intercollegiate Athletic Conference football standings
| | Conf. | | | | | Overall |
| Team | W | | L | | T | W | | L | | T |
|---|---|---|---|---|---|---|---|---|---|---|
| No. 3 Hillsdale $^ | 5 | – | 0 | – | 0 | 10 | – | 2 | – | 0 |
| No. 17 Grand Valley State | 4 | – | 1 | – | 0 | 9 | – | 2 | – | 0 |
| Saginaw Valley State | 3 | – | 2 | – | 0 | 5 | – | 4 | – | 0 |
| Ferris State | 2 | – | 3 | – | 0 | 5 | – | 5 | – | 0 |
| Northwood | 1 | – | 4 | – | 0 | 1 | – | 8 | – | 0 |
| Wayne State (MI) | 0 | – | 5 | – | 0 | 3 | – | 7 | – | 0 |
$ – Conference champion; ^ – NAIA Division I playoff participant; Rankings from NAIA Division I poll for Hillsdale and NCAA Division II Football Committee poll for Grand Valley State

1986 Northern Intercollegiate Conference football standings
| | Conf. | | | | | Overall |
| Team | W | | L | | T | W | | L | | T |
|---|---|---|---|---|---|---|---|---|---|---|
| No. 11 Minnesota Morris $ | 5 | – | 0 | – | 1 | 7 | – | 1 | – | 2 |
| No. 17 Northern State | 5 | – | 1 | – | 0 | 9 | – | 2 | – | 0 |
| Bemidji State | 3 | – | 2 | – | 1 | 6 | – | 4 | – | 1 |
| Winona State | 2 | – | 3 | – | 1 | 3 | – | 7 | – | 1 |
| Moorhead State | 2 | – | 4 | – | 0 | 6 | – | 5 | – | 0 |
| Southwest State (MN) | 2 | – | 4 | – | 0 | 4 | – | 6 | – | 0 |
| Minnesota Duluth | 0 | – | 6 | – | 0 | 0 | – | 11 | – | 0 |
$ – Conference champion; Minnesota Duluth forfeited 8 wins and 2 ties including 4 conference wins—over Northern State, Winona State; Moorhead State, and Southwest State—and 2 conference ties—with Minnesota Morris and Bemidji State.; Rankings from NAIA Division I poll

1986 Oklahoma Intercollegiate Conference football standings
| | Conf. | | | | | Overall |
| Team | W | | L | | T | W | | L | | T |
|---|---|---|---|---|---|---|---|---|---|---|
| No. 9 East Central + | 3 | – | 1 | – | 0 | 7 | – | 3 | – | 0 |
| No. 16 NW Oklahoma State + | 3 | – | 1 | – | 0 | 7 | – | 3 | – | 0 |
| No. 14 SE Oklahoma State | 2 | – | 2 | – | 0 | 7 | – | 3 | – | 0 |
| Northeastern State | 2 | – | 2 | – | 0 | 4 | – | 5 | – | 0 |
| SW Oklahoma State | 0 | – | 4 | – | 0 | 4 | – | 6 | – | 0 |
+ – Conference co-champions; Rankings from NAIA Division I poll

1986 Rocky Mountain Athletic Conference football standings
| | Conf. | | | | | Overall |
| Team | W | | L | | T | W | | L | | T |
|---|---|---|---|---|---|---|---|---|---|---|
| No. 10 Mesa $^ | 6 | – | 0 | – | 0 | 7 | – | 3 | – | 1 |
| New Mexico Highlands | 4 | – | 2 | – | 0 | 5 | – | 5 | – | 0 |
| Fort Lewis | 4 | – | 2 | – | 0 | 4 | – | 5 | – | 0 |
| Western State (CO) | 2 | – | 3 | – | 1 | 3 | – | 5 | – | 1 |
| Adams State | 2 | – | 4 | – | 0 | 2 | – | 8 | – | 0 |
| Colorado Mines | 1 | – | 4 | – | 1 | 3 | – | 5 | – | 1 |
| Western New Mexico | 1 | – | 5 | – | 0 | 3 | – | 7 | – | 0 |
$ – Conference champion; ^ – NAIA Division I playoff participant; Rankings from NAIA Division I poll

1986 South Atlantic Conference football standings
| | Conf. | | | | | Overall |
| Team | W | | L | | T | W | | L | | T |
|---|---|---|---|---|---|---|---|---|---|---|
| No. 2 Carson–Newman $^ | 6 | – | 1 | – | 0 | 12 | – | 1 | – | 0 |
| No. 12 Elon | 5 | – | 2 | – | 0 | 8 | – | 2 | – | 0 |
| No. 15 Mars Hill | 4 | – | 3 | – | 0 | 7 | – | 3 | – | 1 |
| Gardner–Webb | 4 | – | 3 | – | 0 | 6 | – | 5 | – | 0 |
| Catawba | 3 | – | 4 | – | 0 | 5 | – | 6 | – | 0 |
| Presbyterian | 3 | – | 4 | – | 0 | 5 | – | 6 | – | 0 |
| Newberry | 2 | – | 5 | – | 0 | 4 | – | 7 | – | 0 |
| Lenoir–Rhyne | 1 | – | 6 | – | 0 | 4 | – | 7 | – | 0 |
$ – Conference champion; ^ – NAIA Division I playoff participant; Rankings from NAIA Division I poll

1986 West Virginia Intercollegiate Athletic Conference football standings
| | Conf. | | | | | Overall |
| Team | W | | L | | T | W | | L | | T |
|---|---|---|---|---|---|---|---|---|---|---|
| No. 7 Shepherd $^ | 7 | – | 0 | – | 0 | 8 | – | 3 | – | 0 |
| Fairmont State | 5 | – | 2 | – | 0 | 6 | – | 4 | – | 0 |
| West Virginia Tech | 5 | – | 2 | – | 0 | 6 | – | 4 | – | 0 |
| Salem | 4 | – | 3 | – | 0 | 5 | – | 5 | – | 0 |
| Concord | 2 | – | 5 | – | 0 | 5 | – | 5 | – | 0 |
| West Liberty State | 2 | – | 5 | – | 0 | 4 | – | 6 | – | 0 |
| Glenville State | 2 | – | 5 | – | 0 | 2 | – | 8 | – | 0 |
| West Virginia State | 1 | – | 6 | – | 0 | 3 | – | 7 | – | 0 |
$ – Conference champion; ^ – NAIA Division I playoff participant; Rankings from NAIA Division I poll

1986 NAIA Division I independents football records
| | Conf. | | | Overall |
| Team | W | L | T | W | | L | | T |
|---|---|---|---|---|---|---|---|---|
| No. 5 Cameron ^ | | – | | 11 | – | 2 | – | 1 |
| Guilford | | – | | 6 | – | 4 | – | 0 |
| Wofford | | – | | 4 | – | 6 | – | 1 |
| West Virginia Wesleyan | | – | | 4 | – | 6 | – | 0 |
| Central State (OK) | | – | | 3 | – | 5 | – | 1 |
| Langston | | – | | 2 | – | 7 | – | 0 |
^ – NAIA Division I playoff participant; Rankings from NAIA Division I poll

== Conference champions ==
| Conference | Champion | Record |
|---|---|---|
| Arkansas Intercollegiate | Central Arkansas | 7–0 |
| Central States | Pittsburg State | 7–0 |
| NIC | Minnesota–Morris | 5–0–1 |
| Oklahoma | East Central State; Northwestern Oklahoma State | 3–1 |
| RMAC | Mesa | 6–0 |
| South Atlantic | Carson–Newman | 6–1 |
| WVIAC | Shepherd | 7–0 |

== Postseason ==
Quarterfinals; December 6, 1986; Campus sites
Washburn | 24
Pittsburg State* | 58
Central Arkansas | 34
Cameron* (OT) | 35
Hillsdale | 27
Mesa* | 17
Shepherd | 10
Carson–Newman* | 30

Semifinals; December 13, 1986; Campus sites
Pittsburg State | 6
Cameron* | 17
Hillsdale | 16
Carson–Newman* (OT) | 19

1986 Champion Bowl; December 20, 1986; Jefferson City, TN
Cameron | 0
Carson–Newman* | 17

== See also ==
- 1986 NCAA Division I-A football season
- 1986 NCAA Division I-AA football season
- 1986 NCAA Division II football season
- 1986 NCAA Division III football season
