= Dave Ziff =

American football player (1902–1977)

Profile
- Position: Back

Personal information
- Born: January 18, 1902; Massachusetts, U.S.
- Died: October 17, 1977 (aged 75); New York, New York, U.S.
- Listed height: 6 ft 0 in (1.83 m)
- Listed weight: 195 lb (88 kg)

Career information
- High school: Northampton (MA)
- College: Syracuse, Carson-Newman

Career history
- Rochester Jeffersons (1925); Brooklyn Lions (1926); Bayonne Vikings (1928); Newark Bears (1929)

David S. Ziff (January 18, 1902 – October 17, 1977) was an American football player.

Born in 1902 in Massachusetts, he attended Northampton High School. He began his college career at Syracuse University and played for the Syracuse football team in 1923. He was declared ineligible for playing with the Culture basketball team and transferred with six other Syracuse players to Carson–Newman College in Tennessee.

He played professional football in the National Football League (NFL) for the Rochester Jeffersons in 1925, appearing in four games at left end, including three games as a starter. He was described as "a tower of strength, both offensively and defensively," who "managed to get into practically every play and stood out like the lights that guide a mariner into the harbor."

In September 1926, he signed with the Brooklyn Lions, also of the NFL. He was Brooklyn's starting right end in seven games during the 1926 season. He was described by The Brooklyn Daily Times as "an end of exceptional ability." He was also recognized as one of a handful of Jews playing professional football.

He also played for the Bayonne Vikings in 1928 and the Newark Bears in 1929.

Ziff died on October 17, 1977, at the age of 75 in New York City.
