= Robert Edward Lee Mountcastle =

- Born: February 21, 1865; Jefferson City, Tennessee
- Died: August 9, 1913 (aged 48)
- Parent(s): Andrew Jackson Mountcastle; Cornelia Frances Williams

Robert Edward Lee Mountcastle (February 21, 1865 – August 9, 1913) was a member of the Democratic National Committee and president of the Tennessee State Bar Association from 1902 to 1903.

== Biography ==
He was born in Jefferson City, Tennessee, on February 21, 1865, to Andrew Jackson Mountcastle and Cornelia Frances Williams. He had two brothers, Frank Mountcastle of Johnson City, and George Mountcastle of Lexington, North Carolina. He had two sisters, Mrs. Clyde Yoe and Eulah Mountcastle of Jefferson City, Tennessee.

He received his degree of A.B. from Carson–Newman College in Jefferson City, Tennessee. He then attended Washington and Lee University in Lexington, Virginia, graduating from there with a second A.B. degree in 1882.

In 1885 he was admitted to the Tennessee Bar Association and began practicing law in Lynchburg, Tennessee.

On March 20, 1889, he married Eliza Bird Salmon of Lynchburg, Tennessee. They had two daughters and two sons, Louise Mountcastle, Marguerite Mountcastle, Paul Mountcastle, and Frederick Mountcastle.

In 1892 he moved to Morristown, Tennessee, and formed a law firm with James T. Shields and John Knight Shields. He later moved to Knoxville, Tennessee, and became a member of Shields, Cates & Mountcastle.

In 1904 he was elected Democratic National Committeeman from Tennessee. From 1900 to 1904 he was a member of the Tennessee State Democratic Executive Committee, and was also a district delegate to the 1892 Democratic National Convention in Chicago, Illinois. He was appointed to the staff of James Beriah Frazier in January 1903.

He died on August 9, 1913, of uremia.
