= 1988 Central State Marauders football team =

American college football season

1988 Central State Marauders football

Black college national champion

NAIA Division I Semifinals, L 0–13 vs. Carson–Newman
- Conference: Independent
- Record: 11–2
- Head coach: Billy Joe (8th season)
- Home stadium: McPherson Stadium

1988 NAIA Division I independents football records
	Conf.			Overall
Team	W	L	T	W		L		T
No. 6 Central State (OH) ^		–		11	–	2	–	0
West Virginia Wesleyan		–		6	–	4	–	0
Arkansas–Pine Bluff		–		4	–	6	–	1
Langston		–		2	–	7	–	0
Guilford		–		2	–	8	–	0
^ – NAIA Division I playoff participant; Rankings from NAIA Division I poll

The 1988 Central State Marauders football team represented Central State University as an independent during the 1988 NAIA Division I football season. Led by eighth-year head coach Billy Joe, the Marauders compiled an overall record of 11–2. At the conclusion of the season, the Marauders were recognized as black college national champions.

== Schedule ==
Date	Opponent	Site	Result	Attendance	Source
September 3	at Urbana	Evans Stadium; Urbana, OH	W 61–6		
September 10	at Virginia State	Rogers Stadium; Ettrick, VA	W 28–6	1,000	
September 17	Butler	McPherson Stadium; Wilberforce, OH	W 55–10		
September 24	Northeast Missouri State	McPherson Stadium; Wilberforce, OH	W 31–14	2,100	
October 1	at Johnson C. Smith	American Legion Memorial Stadium; Charlotte, NC	W 26–19	5,129	
October 15	Kentucky State	McPherson Stadium; Wilberforce, OH	W 71–14		
October 22	Fort Valley State^{†}	McPherson Stadium; Wilberforce, OH	W 21–7		
November 5	at Northern Michigan	Memorial Field; Marquette, MI	L 7–23		
November 12	at Arkansas–Pine Bluff	Pumphrey Stadium; Pine Bluff, AR	W 13–0		
November 19	at Florida A&M	Bragg Memorial Stadium; Tallahassee, FL	W 27–23	7,467	
November 26	Catawba	McPherson Stadium; Wilberforce, OH (NAIA Division I First Round)	W 24–10		
December 3	at Hillsdale	Frank "Muddy" Waters Stadium; Hillsdale, MI (NAIA Division I Quarterfinal)	W 14–7		
December 10	Carson–Newman	McPherson Stadium; Wilberforce, OH (NAIA Division I Semifinal)	L 0–13		
^{†}Homecoming
