= 1984 Central Arkansas Bears football team =

American college football season

1984 Central Arkansas Bears football

NAIA Division I national co-champion AIC champion

Champion Bowl, T 19–19 vs. Carson–Newman
- Conference: Arkansas Intercollegiate Conference
- Record: 10–2–1 (6–0 AIC)
- Head coach: Harold Horton (3rd season)
- Home stadium: Estes Stadium

1984 Arkansas Intercollegiate Conference football standings
	Conf.					Overall
Team	W		L		T	W		L		T
No. 3 Central Arkansas $^	6	–	0	–	0	10	–	2	–	1
Southern Arkansas	3	–	2	–	1	5	–	4	–	1
Ouachita Baptist	3	–	3	–	0	6	–	4	–	0
Arkansas Tech	3	–	3	–	0	4	–	5	–	0
Harding	2	–	3	–	1	5	–	3	–	1
Henderson State	2	–	4	–	0	4	–	6	–	0
Arkansas–Monticello	1	–	5	–	0	5	–	5	–	0
$ – Conference champion; ^ – NAIA Division I playoff participant; Rankings from NAIA Division I poll

The 1984 Central Arkansas Bears football team represented University of Central Arkansas as a member of the Arkansas Intercollegiate Conference (AIC) during the 1984 NAIA Division I football season. Led by third-year head coach Harold Horton, the Bears compiled an overall record of 10–2–1 with a mark of 6–0 in conference play, and finished as AIC champion. Central Arkansas advanced to the NAIA playoffs and tied Carson–Newman in the Champion Bowl.

== Schedule ==
Date	Opponent	Site	Result	Attendance	Source
September 8	at Southeast Missouri State*	Houck Stadium; Cape Girardeau, MO	W 21–14		
September 15	at Northeastern State (OK)*	Gable Field; Tahlequah, OK	L 14–20		
September 22	vs. Arkansas–Pine Bluff*	War Memorial Stadium; Little Rock, AR	W 42–7		
September 29	Northwest Missouri State*	Estes Stadium; Conway, AR	L 7–14		
October 6	Arkansas–Monticello	Estes Stadium; Conway, AR	W 20–0		
October 13	at Southern Arkansas	Wilkins Stadium; Magnolia, AR	W 48–28		
October 20	at Ouachita Baptist	Cliff Harris Stadium; Arkadelphia, AR	W 10–3		
October 27	Arkansas Tech	Estes Stadium; Conway, AR	W 21–14		
November 10	Henderson State	Estes Stadium; Conway, AR	W 14–6		
November 17	at Harding	Searcy, AR	W 14–3		
December 1	Moorhead State*	Estes Stadium; Conway, AR (NAIA Division I Quarterfinal)	W 30–6		
December 8	Central Washington*	Estes Stadium; Conway, AR (NAIA Division I Semifinal)	W 44–6		
December 15	Carson–Newman*	Estes Stadium; Conway, AR (Champion Bowl)	T 19–19	5,764	
*Non-conference game
