= Mountcastle, Virginia =

Unincorporated community in Virginia, US

Coordinates: 37°27′13″N 77°05′38″W

Mountcastle is an unincorporated community in New Kent County, Virginia, United States.
