= 1984 NAIA Division I football season =

American college football season

- Regular season: August–November 1984
- Postseason: December 1–15, 1984
- National Championship: Estes Stadium; Conway, AR
- Champions: Carson–Newman (2); Central Arkansas

The 1984 NAIA Division I football season was the 15th season of play of the NAIA's top division for football.

The season was played from August to November 1984 and culminated in the 1984 NAIA Champion Bowl, played this year on December 15, 1984 at Estes Stadium in Conway, Arkansas on the campus of the University of Central Arkansas.

Carson–Newman and Central Arkansas played to a tie, 19–19, in the Champion Bowl and both teams were named co-national champions, Carson–Newman's second NAIA title and Central Arkansas' first.

== Conference changes ==
- This was the final season for the Evergreen Conference, which disbanded at the end of the year after sixty-four years of football play. Most of its membership, along with several independent teams, would subsequently join the new Columbia Football League.

== Conference standings ==
1984 Arkansas Intercollegiate Conference football standings
	Conf.					Overall
Team	W		L		T	W		L		T
No. 3 Central Arkansas $^	6	–	0	–	0	10	–	2	–	1
Southern Arkansas	3	–	2	–	1	5	–	4	–	1
Ouachita Baptist	3	–	3	–	0	6	–	4	–	0
Arkansas Tech	3	–	3	–	0	4	–	5	–	0
Harding	2	–	3	–	1	5	–	3	–	1
Henderson State	2	–	4	–	0	4	–	6	–	0
Arkansas–Monticello	1	–	5	–	0	5	–	5	–	0
$ – Conference champion; ^ – NAIA Division I playoff participant; Rankings from NAIA Division I poll

1984 Central States Intercollegiate Conference football standings
	Conf.					Overall
Team	W		L		T	W		L		T
Kearney State $	6	–	1	–	0	6	–	4	–	0
Wayne State (NE)	5	–	2	–	0	8	–	3	–	0
No. 15 Missouri Southern	5	–	2	–	0	6	–	3	–	0
Pittsburg State	4	–	3	–	0	5	–	4	–	0
Missouri Western	4	–	3	–	0	4	–	6	–	1
Emporia State	2	–	5	–	0	3	–	7	–	0
Washburn	2	–	5	–	0	2	–	8	–	0
Fort Hays State *	0	–	7	–	0	0	–	10	–	0
$ – Conference champion; * – Fort Hay forfeited four victories including a conference win over Wayne State (NE).; Rankings from NAIA Division I poll

1984 Evergreen Conference football standings
	Conf.					Overall
Team	W		L		T	W		L		T
No. 2 Central Washington $^	8	–	0	–	0	11	–	2	–	0
No. 19 Simon Fraser	5	–	2	–	0	7	–	3	–	0
Southern Oregon	4	–	3	–	0	6	–	4	–	0
Puget Sound	4	–	3	–	1	5	–	4	–	1
Oregon Tech	3	–	4	–	0	3	–	4	–	2
Whitworth	3	–	4	–	0	4	–	5	–	0
Western Oregon	3	–	4	–	0	3	–	5	–	2
Western Washington	2	–	5	–	1	2	–	7	–	1
Eastern Oregon	0	–	8	–	0	0	–	10	–	0
$ – Conference champion; ^ – NAIA Division I playoff participant; Rankings from NAIA Division I poll

1984 Great Lakes Intercollegiate Athletic Conference football standings
	Conf.					Overall
Team	W		L		T	W		L		T
No. 6 Saginaw Valley State $^	6	–	0	–	0	8	–	3	–	0
No. 17 Northwood	5	–	1	–	0	6	–	3	–	0
Wayne State (MI)	4	–	2	–	0	6	–	5	–	0
Hillsdale	3	–	3	–	0	6	–	4	–	0
Michigan Tech	2	–	4	–	0	4	–	6	–	0
Ferris State	1	–	5	–	0	2	–	8	–	0
Grand Valley State	0	–	6	–	0	0	–	10	–	0
$ – Conference champion; ^ – NAIA Division I playoff participant; Rankings from NAIA Division I poll

1984 Northern Intercollegiate Conference football standings
	Conf.					Overall
Team	W		L		T	W		L		T
No. 8 Moorhead State +^	5	–	1	–	0	8	–	3	–	0
Minnesota Morris +	5	–	1	–	0	5	–	4	–	0
No. 14 Bemidji State	4	–	2	–	0	8	–	3	–	0
Minnesota Duluth	4	–	2	–	0	6	–	4	–	0
Winona State	2	–	4	–	0	3	–	7	–	0
Northern State	1	–	5	–	0	3	–	7	–	0
Southwest State (MN)	0	–	6	–	0	3	–	7	–	0
+ – Conference co-champions; ^ – NAIA Division I playoff participant; Rankings from NAIA Division I poll

1984 Oklahoma Intercollegiate Conference football standings
	Conf.					Overall
Team	W		L		T	W		L		T
No. 1 East Central $^	4	–	0	–	0	10	–	2	–	0
No. 12 NW Oklahoma State	3	–	1	–	0	7	–	3	–	0
Northeastern State	2	–	2	–	0	5	–	4	–	0
SW Oklahoma State	1	–	3	–	0	4	–	6	–	0
SE Oklahoma State	0	–	4	–	0	2	–	9	–	0
$ – Conference champion; ^ – NAIA Division I playoff participant; Rankings from NAIA Division I poll

1984 Rocky Mountain Athletic Conference football standings
	Conf.					Overall
Team	W		L		T	W		L		T
No. 11 Fort Lewis $	7	–	0	–	1	7	–	2	–	1
No. 20 Adams State	6	–	2	–	0	6	–	3	–	0
Southern Utah	5	–	3	–	0	6	–	4	–	0
Western State (CO)	3	–	5	–	0	3	–	7	–	0
New Mexico Highlands	3	–	5	–	0	3	–	8	–	0
Colorado Mines	2	–	6	–	0	3	–	7	–	0
Southern Colorado	2	–	6	–	0	2	–	8	–	0
Mesa *	1	–	7	–	0	2	–	8	–	0
Western New Mexico **	5	–	2	–	1	7	–	2	–	1
$ – Conference champion; * – Mesa forfeited five conference wins, over Southern Colorado, Southern Utah, Western State, Colorado Mines, and Western New Mexico, due to an ineligible player ** – Western New Mexico on probation and ineligible for conference title and postseason play; Rankings from NAIA Division I poll

1984 South Atlantic Conference football standings
	Conf.					Overall
Team	W		L		T	W		L		T
No. 5 Carson–Newman $^	6	–	1	–	0	10	–	2	–	1
No. 13 Elon	5	–	2	–	0	7	–	3	–	0
Newberry	5	–	2	–	0	7	–	4	–	0
Presbyterian	5	–	2	–	0	7	–	4	–	0
Mars Hill	4	–	3	–	0	6	–	5	–	0
Gardner–Webb	2	–	5	–	0	4	–	6	–	0
Lenoir–Rhyne	1	–	6	–	0	1	–	10	–	0
Catawba	0	–	7	–	0	3	–	8	–	0
$ – Conference champion; ^ – NAIA Division I playoff participant; Rankings from NAIA Division I poll

1984 West Virginia Intercollegiate Athletic Conference football standings
	Conf.					Overall
Team	W		L		T	W		L		T
No. 7 Concord +^	7	–	1	–	0	8	–	3	–	0
No. 4 Salem +^	7	–	1	–	0	8	–	3	–	0
No. 16 Shepherd	6	–	2	–	0	7	–	3	–	0
Glenville State	5	–	3	–	0	6	–	3	–	0
Fairmont State	4	–	4	–	0	5	–	5	–	0
West Virginia State	3	–	4	–	1	4	–	5	–	1
West Virginia Tech	2	–	5	–	1	3	–	6	–	1
West Virginia Wesleyan	1	–	7	–	0	1	–	9	–	0
West Liberty State	0	–	8	–	0	1	–	9	–	0
+ – Conference co-champions; ^ – NAIA Division I playoff participant; Rankings from NAIA Division I poll

1984 NAIA Division I independents football records
	Conf.			Overall
Team	W	L	T	W		L		T
No. 10 Central State (OK)		–		7	–	3	–	0
No. 18 Guilford		–		7	–	3	–	0
Cameron		–		5	–	5	–	0
Eastern New Mexico		–		5	–	5	–	0
Langston		–		3	–	8	–	0
Kentucky State		–		2	–	9	–	0
Wofford		–		2	–	9	–	0
Rankings from NAIA Division I poll

== Conference champions ==
Conference	Champion	Record
Arkansas Intercollegiate	Central Arkansas	6–0
Central States	Kearney State	6–1
Evergreen	Central Washington	8–0
NIC	Moorhead State (MN); Minnesota–Morris	5–1
Oklahoma	East Central State	4–0
RMAC	Fort Lewis	7–0–1
South Atlantic	Carson–Newman	6–1
WVIAC	Concord (WV); Salem (WV)	7–0

== Postseason ==
Quarterfinals; December 1, 1984; Campus sites
Salem (WV)	7
Saginaw Valley State*	30
Concord	6
Carson–Newman*	42
Central Washington	22
East Central*	20
Moorhead State	6
Central Arkansas*	30

Semifinals; December 8, 1984; Campus sites
Saginaw Valley State	21
Carson–Newman*	24
Central Washington	6
Central Arkansas*	44

1984 Champion Bowl; December 15, 1984; Conway, AR
Carson–Newman	19
Central Arkansas*	19

== See also ==
- 1984 NAIA Division II football season
- 1984 NCAA Division I-A football season
- 1984 NCAA Division I-AA football season
- 1984 NCAA Division II football season
- 1984 NCAA Division III football season
