= 1983 NAIA Division I football season =

American college football season

- Regular season: August–November 1983
- Postseason: December 3–17, 1983
- National Championship: Ralph Stocker Stadium; Grand Junction, CO
- Champions: Carson–Newman

The 1983 NAIA Division I football season was the 28th season of college football sponsored by the NAIA, was the 14th season of play of the NAIA's top division for football.

The season was played from August to November 1983 and culminated in the 1983 NAIA Champion Bowl, played this year on December 17, 1983, at Ralph Stocker Stadium in Grand Junction, Colorado on the campus of Mesa College—now known as Colorado Mesa University.

Carson–Newman defeated Mesa in the Champion Bowl, 36–28, to win their first NAIA national title.

== Conference changes ==
- This is the final season that the Central Intercollegiate Athletic Association is officially recognized as an NAIA football conference.

== Conference standings ==
1983 Arkansas Intercollegiate Conference football standings
	Conf.					Overall
Team	W		L		T	W		L		T
No. 1 Central Arkansas $^	6	–	0	–	0	11	–	1	–	0
Arkansas Tech	4	–	1	–	1	4	–	5	–	1
Southern Arkansas	4	–	2	–	0	5	–	5	–	0
No. 16 Arkansas–Monticello	3	–	2	–	1	6	–	2	–	1
Ouachita Baptist	1	–	4	–	1	2	–	7	–	1
Henderson State	1	–	5	–	0	3	–	7	–	0
Harding	0	–	5	–	1	3	–	6	–	1
$ – Conference champion; ^ – NAIA Division I playoff participant; Rankings from NAIA Division I poll

1983 Central States Intercollegiate Conference football standings
	Conf.					Overall
Team	W		L		T	W		L		T
No. 9 Washburn $	6	–	1	–	0	8	–	2	–	0
No. 10 Missouri Southern	5	–	2	–	0	9	–	2	–	0
No. 17 Fort Hays State	4	–	3	–	0	8	–	3	–	0
Pittsburg State	4	–	3	–	0	6	–	4	–	0
Kearney State	4	–	3	–	0	5	–	5	–	0
Missouri Western	3	–	4	–	0	5	–	6	–	0
Emporia State	1	–	6	–	0	2	–	8	–	0
Wayne State (NE)	1	–	6	–	0	1	–	9	–	0
$ – Conference champion; Rankings from NAIA Division I poll

1983 Evergreen Conference football standings
	Conf.					Overall
Team	W		L		T	W		L		T
Puget Sound $	6	–	1	–	0	6	–	4	–	0
Southern Oregon	5	–	2	–	0	9	–	2	–	0
No. 14 Central Washington	5	–	2	–	0	8	–	2	–	0
Simon Fraser	4	–	3	–	0	4	–	6	–	0
Eastern Oregon	3	–	4	–	0	5	–	5	–	0
Oregon Tech	2	–	5	–	0	4	–	6	–	0
Western Oregon	2	–	5	–	0	3	–	7	–	0
Western Washington	1	–	6	–	0	1	–	9	–	0
$ – Conference champion; Rankings from NAIA Division I poll

1983 Great Lakes Intercollegiate Athletic Conference football standings
	Conf.					Overall
Team	W		L		T	W		L		T
No. 7 Saginaw Valley State $^	6	–	0	–	0	9	–	3	–	0
No. 8 Hillsdale	4	–	2	–	0	8	–	2	–	0
Wayne State (MI)	4	–	2	–	0	7	–	3	–	0
Northwood	3	–	3	–	0	4	–	4	–	0
Grand Valley State	3	–	3	–	0	4	–	6	–	0
Michigan Tech	1	–	5	–	0	3	–	7	–	0
Ferris State	0	–	6	–	0	0	–	9	–	0
$ – Conference champion; ^ – NAIA Division I playoff participant; Rankings from NAIA Division I poll

1983 Northern Intercollegiate Conference football standings
	Conf.					Overall
Team	W		L		T	W		L		T
No. 20 Winona State $	5	–	1	–	0	7	–	4	–	0
Moorhead State	4	–	2	–	0	6	–	3	–	0
Minnesota Duluth	4	–	2	–	0	6	–	4	–	0
Minnesota Morris	2	–	3	–	1	4	–	4	–	2
Northern State	1	–	3	–	2	4	–	4	–	2
Southwest State (MN)	1	–	3	–	2	3	–	6	–	2
Bemidji State	1	–	4	–	1	4	–	6	–	1
$ – Conference champion; Rankings from NAIA Division I poll

1983 Oklahoma Intercollegiate Conference football standings
	Conf.					Overall
Team	W		L		T	W		L		T
No. 4 Northeastern State $^	4	–	0	–	0	8	–	2	–	0
No. 13 East Central	2	–	2	–	0	7	–	3	–	0
NW Oklahoma State	2	–	2	–	0	4	–	6	–	0
SW Oklahoma State	2	–	2	–	0	3	–	6	–	0
SE Oklahoma State	0	–	4	–	0	1	–	9	–	0
$ – Conference champion; ^ – NAIA Division I playoff participant; Rankings from NAIA Division I poll

1983 Rocky Mountain Athletic Conference football standings
	Conf.					Overall
Team	W		L		T	W		L		T
No. 3 Mesa $^	7	–	0	–	1	11	–	1	–	1
Southern Colorado	6	–	1	–	1	6	–	3	–	1
Western New Mexico	4	–	3	–	1	5	–	4	–	1
Southern Utah	4	–	4	–	0	5	–	5	–	0
Adams State	4	–	4	–	0	4	–	6	–	0
Fort Lewis	4	–	4	–	0	4	–	6	–	0
Colorado Mines	3	–	5	–	0	4	–	5	–	0
Western State (CO)	2	–	5	–	1	2	–	6	–	1
New Mexico Highlands	0	–	8	–	0	1	–	9	–	0
$ – Conference champion; ^ – NAIA Division I playoff participant

1983 South Atlantic Conference football standings
	Conf.					Overall
Team	W		L		T	W		L		T
No. 12 Carson–Newman $^	6	–	1	–	0	10	–	3	–	0
Presbyterian	4	–	2	–	1	5	–	5	–	1
No. 18 Elon	4	–	3	–	0	7	–	3	–	0
Gardner–Webb	4	–	3	–	0	5	–	6	–	0
Mars Hill	3	–	3	–	1	4	–	7	–	1
Newberry	3	–	4	–	0	6	–	5	–	0
Lenoir–Rhyne	2	–	5	–	0	4	–	6	–	0
Catawba	0	–	7	–	0	0	–	9	–	1
$ – Conference champion; ^ – NAIA Division I playoff participant; Rankings from NAIA Division I poll

1983 West Virginia Intercollegiate Athletic Conference football standings
	Conf.					Overall
Team	W		L		T	W		L		T
No. 5 Shepherd $^	8	–	0	–	0	9	–	2	–	0
Glenville State	6	–	2	–	0	6	–	2	–	1
Concord	5	–	3	–	0	5	–	5	–	0
West Virginia Tech	4	–	3	–	1	5	–	4	–	1
West Liberty State	3	–	3	–	2	4	–	4	–	2
Fairmont State	2	–	5	–	1	2	–	7	–	1
Salem	2	–	6	–	0	3	–	7	–	0
West Virginia State	2	–	6	–	0	3	–	7	–	0
West Virginia Wesleyan	2	–	6	–	0	2	–	8	–	0
$ – Conference champion; ^ – NAIA Division I playoff participant; Rankings from NAIA Division I poll

1983 Wisconsin State University Conference football standings
	Conf.					Overall
Team	W		L		T	W		L		T
No. 11 Wisconsin–Eau Claire $	7	–	1	–	0	8	–	2	–	0
Wisconsin–La Crosse ^	6	–	1	–	1	9	–	3	–	1
Wisconsin–River Falls	6	–	2	–	0	8	–	2	–	0
Wisconsin–Whitewater	6	–	2	–	0	6	–	5	–	0
Wisconsin–Oshkosh	3	–	4	–	1	5	–	4	–	1
Wisconsin–Platteville	3	–	5	–	0	4	–	6	–	0
Wisconsin–Stevens Point	2	–	6	–	0	4	–	6	–	0
Wisconsin–Stout	2	–	6	–	0	2	–	9	–	0
Wisconsin–Superior	0	–	8	–	0	1	–	10	–	0
$ – Conference champion; ^ – NCAA Division III playoff participant; Rankings from NAIA Division I poll

1983 NAIA Division I independents football records
	Conf.			Overall
Team	W	L	T	W		L		T
No. 2 Central State (OK) ^		–		8	–	1	–	1
No. 6 Eastern New Mexico ^		–		8	–	2	–	1
Guilford		–		5	–	4	–	1
Wofford		–		6	–	5	–	0
Langston		–		4	–	6	–	0
Cameron		–		3	–	6	–	0
Arkansas-Pine Bluff		–		2	–	7	–	1
Kentucky State		–		2	–	7	–	2
Liberty Baptist		–		2	–	9	–	0
^ – NAIA Division I playoff participant; Rankings from NAIA Division I poll

== Conference champions ==
Conference	Champion	Record
Arkansas Intercollegiate	Central Arkansas	6–0
Central States	Washburn	6–1
Evergreen	Puget Sound	6–1
NIC	Winona State	5–1
Oklahoma	Northeastern State	4–0
RMAC	Mesa	7–0–1
South Atlantic	Carson–Newman	6–1
WSUC	Wisconsin–Eau Claire	7–1
WVIAC	Shepherd	8–0

== Postseason ==
Quarterfinals; December 3, 1983; Campus sites
Saginaw Valley State	14
Central State (OK)*	13
Shepherd	21
Carson–Newman*	42
Northeastern State	7
Central Arkansas*	18
Eastern New Mexico	9
Mesa*	35

Semifinals; December 10, 1983; Campus sites
Saginaw Valley State	7
Carson–Newman*	41
Central Arkansas	17
Mesa*	34

1983 Champion Bowl; December 17, 1983; Grand Junction, CO
Carson–Newman	36
Mesa*	28

== See also ==
- 1983 NAIA Division II football season
- 1983 NCAA Division I-A football season
- 1983 NCAA Division I-AA football season
- 1983 NCAA Division II football season
- 1983 NCAA Division III football season
