= Meares Stadium =

Sports venue in Mars Hill, North Carolina

Coordinates: 35.827587°N 82.553512°W

Meares Stadium is a 5,000-capacity stadium located in Mars Hill, North Carolina, where it serves as home to the Mars Hill College Lions.

Meares Stadium has gained a reputation as a difficult stadium to play on due to its location in the windy North Carolina mountains. Winds can get high enough to move a stationary ball, and, in some circumstances, smaller athletes. In 2007, the college began a renovation project at Meares Stadium, which was completed by August in the same year. This renovation added a pressbox and replaced the previous field with synthetic turf, in addition to increasing visitor seating. The field was replaced once again in 2020, and new lighting was added in the same year.
