= Burke–Tarr Stadium =

College sports stadium in Tennessee, US

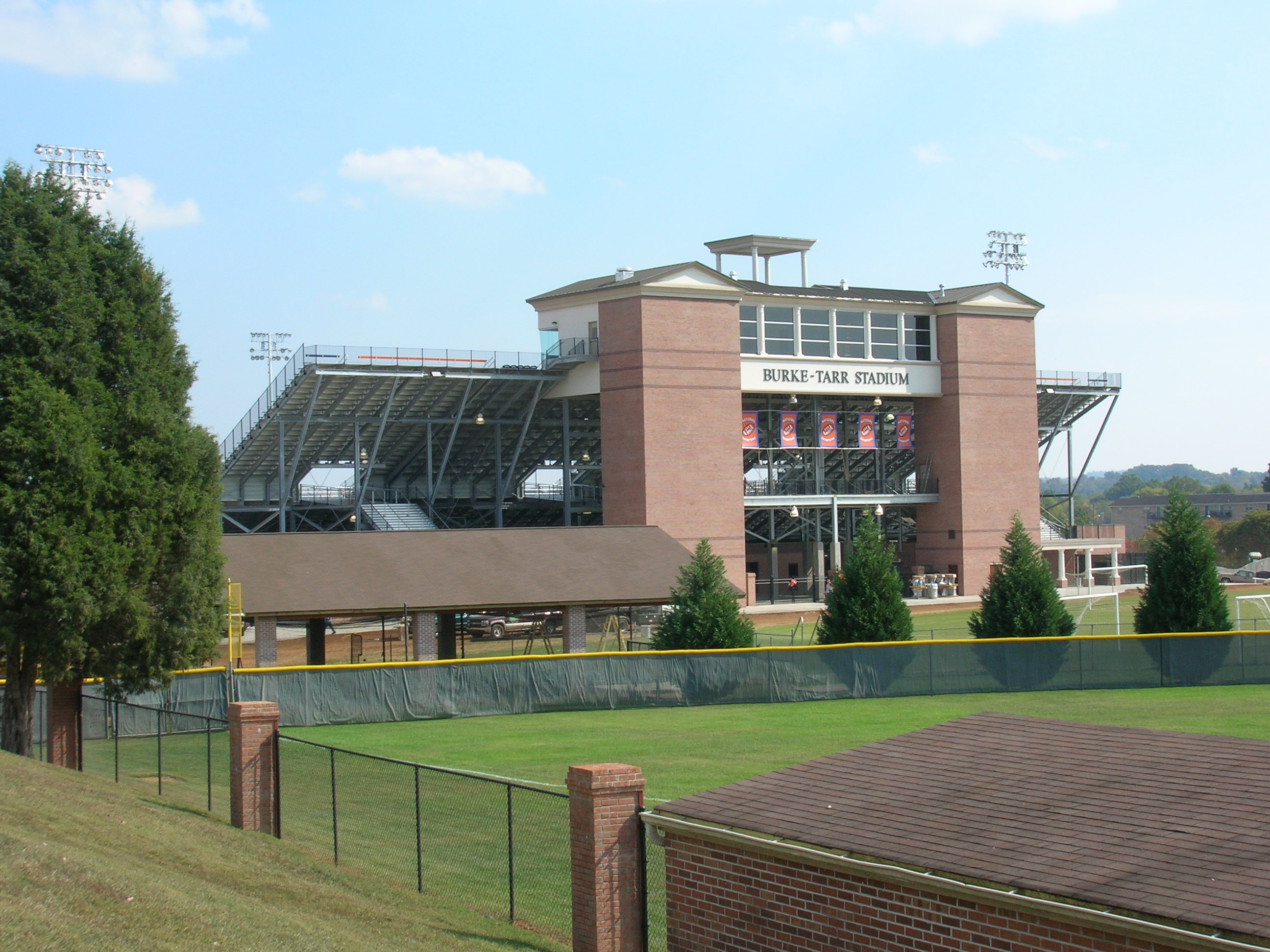
- Interactive map of Burke–Tarr Stadium
- Location: Jefferson City, Tennessee
- Coordinates: 36°7′19.31″N 83°29′8.15″W
- Owner: Carson–Newman University
- Operator: Carson–Newman University
- Capacity: 6,500
- Surface: FieldTurf

Construction
- Opened: October 22, 2005

Tenant
- Carson–Newman University Eagles (NCAA) (2005–present)

Burke–Tarr Stadium is a football stadium located in Jefferson City, Tennessee on the campus of Carson–Newman University.

== History ==
The original structure, consisting primarily of concrete-supported wooden bleachers and a small press box, was constructed in 1966 to serve as the home for the Carson–Newman Eagles football, then a member of the NAIA.

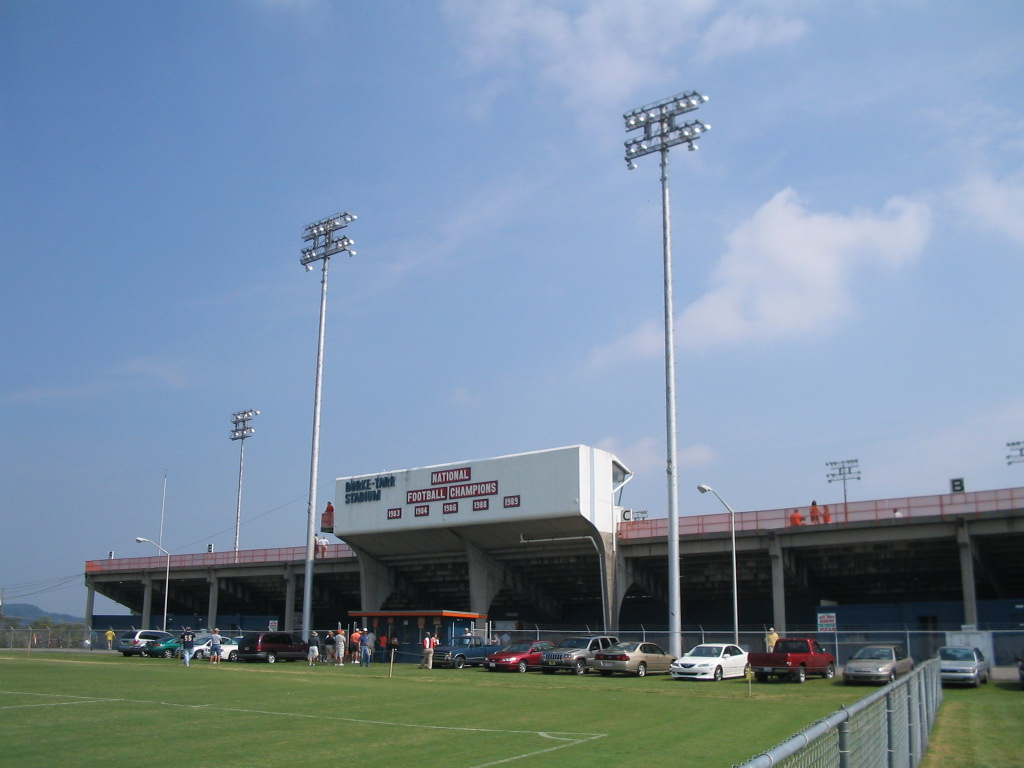
The original Burke-Tarr before demolition.

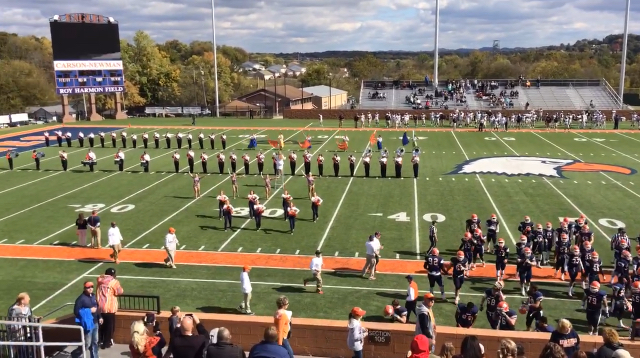
The new field in 2016.

The new Burke–Tarr Stadium was erected within nine months of the original's demolition, and was dedicated on October 22, 2005 during Homecoming festivities as the Eagles defeated Lenoir–Rhyne, 33–6. The facility's main stands consist primarily of steel and aluminum, as concrete prices at the time of construction made it impossible to afford a concrete structure. The metal design allowed for four additional entrances to the main stands via stairwells from the ground level, in addition to the entrances on either end of the stadium. The stands contain press box supported by two steel and brick columns, leaving a great deal of space underneath for concessions stands, merchandise booths, and restroom facilities.

Although the new stadium incorporated the visiting side bleachers from the original stadium (erected much later on in the facility's life) a late donation by a local businessman enabled the college to replace the Bermuda grass field with FieldTurf, a modern artificial surface that is largely similar to grass. The playing field was named for legendary C-N football coach Roy Harmon. The full stadium name is Roy Harmon field at Burke–Tarr Stadium.

Due to the proximity of the Carson-Newman baseball complex, a nearby road, and the space needed for the operations center, the stadium was unable to hold a regulation track, so none was installed. In July 2006, construction began on the football operations center, as well as the completion of the brick fencing in the North end zone and around the visiting side's bleachers. The operations facility was completed in time for the 2008 season, though there is no word on the indoor practice facility funding.

The Eagles completed the 2006 season with an 8–3 record, and ran their record at the new Burke–Tarr Stadium to 7–0. In the 2007 season, the Eagles extended their winning streak at the new stadium to ten games, but suffered their first loss on October 13, 2007 against Catawba College, 55–49. The 2008 season saw the Eagles drop a non-conference home game to the University of North Alabama 20–13 on September 4. Their record at the new stadium now stands at 15–2.

== Eagles' success ==
From 1967 to 2004, the Eagles compiled a 192–37–2 record at the original stadium, which hosted three of the team's five NAIA National Football Championship victories in 1986, 1988, and 1989. After the team moved to NCAA Division II in the early 1990s, the team ran off a home winning streak that stretched from a 62–31 loss to New Haven in 1993, to a 38–28 loss to conference foe Presbyterian on October 6, 2001, a span of 36 regular season games; Northern Colorado defeated the Eagles, 30–29, in a Division II semi-final game in 1997. Since that loss, the Eagles have run off another 22-game home winning streak, discounting a 2005 loss at Jefferson County High School, including two playoff games against Fayetteville State. Since moving up in classification, the Eagles are 63–2 at Burke–Tarr Stadium.

Much of the success at the stadium has come under the coaching era of Ken Sparks, who ranks fourth in most wins among active NCAA coaches.
