= Mars Hill Lions =

Intercollegiate sports teams of Mars Hill University

- University: Mars Hill University
- Conference: South Atlantic (primary)
- NCAA: Division II
- Athletic director: Rick Baker
- Location: Mars Hill, North Carolina
- Varsity teams: 22 (10 men's, 11 women's, 1 co-ed)
- Football stadium: Meares Stadium
- Basketball arena: Stanford Arena
- Baseball stadium: Henderson Field
- Soccer stadium: Belk Field
- Aquatics center: Harrell Pool
- Other venues: Chambers Gymnasium
- Nickname: Lions
- Colors: Royal blue and gold
- Website: marshilllions.com/landing/index

The Mars Hill Lions are the athletic teams that represent Mars Hill University, located in Mars Hill, North Carolina, in NCAA Division II intercollegiate sports.

The Lions are full members of the South Atlantic Conference, home to 18 of its 21 athletics programs. The men's and women's swimming programs are members of the single-sport Appalachian Swimming Conference, and the acrobatics and tumbling team is an associate member of Conference Carolinas.

Mars Hill have been members of the SAC since its founding in 1975.

== Varsity teams ==
Men's sports	Women's sports
Baseball	Acrobatics and tumbling
Basketball	Basketball
Cross Country	Cross Country
Esports	Esports
Football	Flag football
Golf	Golf
Lacrosse	Lacrosse
Soccer	Soccer
Swimming	Softball
Tennis	Swimming
Track and field	Tennis
Weightlifting	Track and field
	Volleyball
	Weightlifting

== Individual teams ==
=== Cross country ===
The men's cross country team have been highly successful over the last two decades; from 1997 to 2014 they won 18 straight conference championships; in 2016 they won their 19th conference championship. In 2014 the men's cross country team won the NCAA Division II Southeast Regional championship and advanced to the Division II national championship meet, and in 2015 they finished in second place in the Division II Southeast Regional championship and advanced to the Division II national meet. In June 2017, Nathan Jones, a member of the Mars Hill cross country team, won the South Atlantic Conference Man of the Year Award, and in 2018 Mars Hill baseball player Zac Brown won the SAC Man of the Year Award.

=== Football ===
In December 2011, Mars Hill running back Jonas Randolph won the prestigious Harlon Hill Trophy, which is given annually to the most valuable player in NCAA Division II football.

== Club sports ==
=== Cycling ===
In May 2011 the cycling team won the USA Cycling Collegiate Division II national championship. In 2012 they finished in second place nationally, and in May 2015 the Mars Hill cycling team finished the season ranked in first place nationally among Division II teams.

=== Weightlifting ===
In March 2025 the Mars Hill Women's Weightlifting Team won the USA Weightlifting Women's National Championship. They scored 230 points, over 45 points more than the second-place finishers, the University of Florida and Lindenwood University. The 45-point differential was the largest point difference by a female team in USA Weightlifting championship history. In the coed division, Mars Hill lost the national title by a single point, to Lindenwood University.
