= Jefferson City, Tennessee =

City in Jefferson County, Tennessee, United States

Jefferson City Mossy Creek
- City
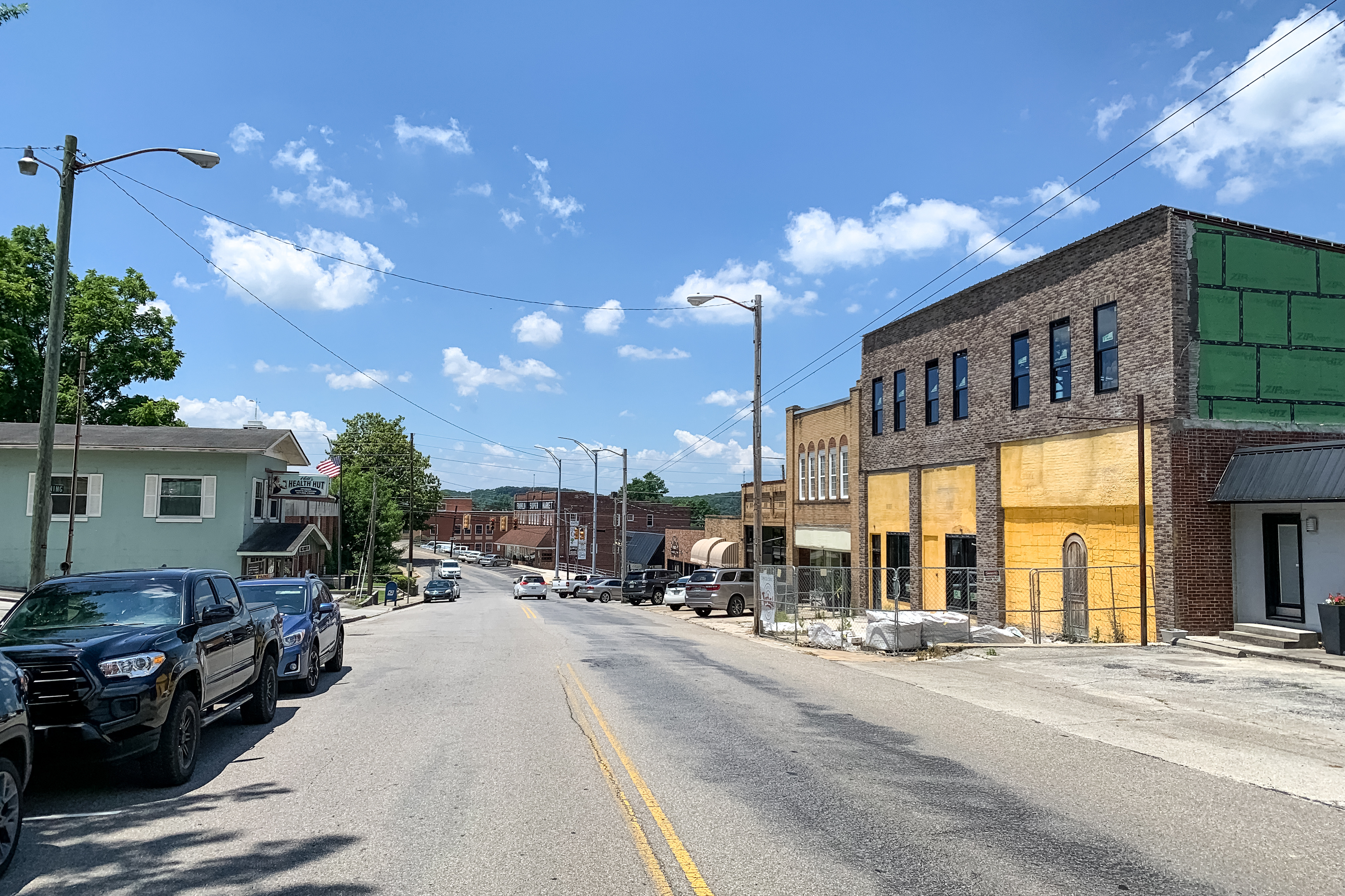
- Old A.J. Highway in downtown Jefferson City
- Motto(s): "A Great Place to Live, Work, and Play."
- Location of Jefferson City in Jefferson County, Tennessee
- Coordinates: 36°6′59″N 83°29′11″W
- Country: United States
- State: Tennessee
- County: Jefferson
- Settled: 1788
- Incorporated: 1901
- Named after: Thomas Jefferson

Government
  - Type: Council-manager
  - Mayor: Mitch Cain
  - City Manager: James Gallup
  - City Council: Council Members: Kevin Bunch; Ailene Combs; Rocky Melton; Shelia Purkey

Area
  - Total: 7.02 sq mi (18.18 km^{2})
  - Land: 6.98 sq mi (18.07 km^{2})
  - Water: 0.042 sq mi (0.11 km^{2})
- Elevation: 1,161 ft (354 m)

Population (2020)
  - Total: 8,419
  - Density: 1,206.9/sq mi (465.99/km^{2})
- Time zone: UTC-5 (Eastern (EST))
  - Summer (DST): UTC-4 (EDT)
- ZIP code: 37760
- Area code: 865
- FIPS code: 47-37960
- GNIS feature ID: 2404796
- Website: www.jeffcitytn.com

Jefferson City (originally named Mossy Creek) is a city in Jefferson County, Tennessee, United States. It is part of the Morristown metropolitan statistical area. As of the 2020 census, its population was 8,419.

== History ==
Heading southwest along the Holston River from Virginia, Adam and Elizabeth Peck arrived on the banks of Mossy Creek in 1788, soon settling the area with a fort, a house of worship, and a gristmill. The original name of the city, Mossy Creek, is thought to have originated due to the first settlers' description of the "vivid" green moss developed around a creek near the settlement. By 1797, Mossy Creek had around 75 to 100 families with a 4-mile-radius of the city.

Around the beginnings of the American Civil War in September 1861, Union Army General Ambrose Burnside liberated the city from the Confederacy, but was attacked in an unsuccessful siege by Confederate General James Longstreet. Several skirmishes took place around Mossy Creek, most notably the Battle of Mossy Creek on December 19, 1863.

In the late 19th century, two communities formed around Mossy Creek, Frame Addition and Carsonville. In 1890, the historically segregated African American school of Nelson Merry College was founded in Mossy Creek. In 1901, Mossy Creek merged with the two communities, incorporating as Jefferson City.

In 1940, the Tennessee Valley Authority (TVA) began purchasing property in Jefferson City for the construction of Cherokee Dam and the impounding of the Holston River for Cherokee Lake. Many residents reluctantly gave up their farms and homes for the promise of flood control and electricity offered by the TVA. Construction brought many new residents to the city, and Cherokee Lake made Jefferson City a popular recreational hub for locals and tourists alike.

In the late 20th century, Jefferson City became industrialized with the zinc-mining industry after geologists discovered valuable zinc ore deposits around the city earlier in the century.

Since 2010, redevelopment and revitalization efforts have been underway in the downtown district of Jefferson City. The Mossy Creek Foundation, a 501(c)(3) organization, was established in 2012 to advance these efforts, receiving funding a for a public park with a mock train depot pavilion on the original site of the Mossy Creek station and facade grants for existing structures downtown.

== Geography ==
Jefferson City is located in northern Jefferson County at 36°6′59″N 83°29′11″W (36.116389, -83.486500). It is bordered to the west by New Market, to the south by Dandridge, and to the northeast by Morristown.

U.S. Route 11E, the Andrew Johnson Highway, passes through the south side of the city. It leads northeast 13 miles (21 km) to the center of Morristown and west 3 miles (5 km) to New Market. Knoxville is 28 miles (45 km) to the southwest via Route 11E. Tennessee State Route 92 passes through the west side of Jefferson City, leading north 14 miles (23 km) to Rutledge and south 9 miles (14 km) to the center of Dandridge.

According to the United States Census Bureau, Jefferson City has a total area of 6.4 square miles (16.6 km^{2}), of which 6.4 square miles (16.5 km^{2}) are land and 0.04 sq mi (0.1 km^{2}), or 0.72%, is covered by water. The northwestern boundary of the city touches the southernmost arm of Cherokee Lake, a reservoir on the Holston River.

=== Climate ===
Climate data for Jefferson City, Tennessee, 1991–2020 normals, extremes 1981–2010
Month	Jan	Feb	Mar	Apr	May	Jun	Jul	Aug	Sep	Oct	Nov	Dec	Year
Record high °F (°C)	74 (23)	79 (26)	84 (29)	89 (32)	103 (39)	98 (37)	98 (37)	102 (39)	95 (35)	89 (32)	81 (27)	79 (26)	103 (39)
Mean daily maximum °F (°C)	47.4 (8.6)	51.4 (10.8)	60.5 (15.8)	69.6 (20.9)	77.9 (25.5)	84.2 (29.0)	87.0 (30.6)	86.5 (30.3)	81.6 (27.6)	71.4 (21.9)	59.9 (15.5)	50.3 (10.2)	69.0 (20.6)
Daily mean °F (°C)	35.9 (2.2)	39.1 (3.9)	46.2 (7.9)	55.1 (12.8)	64.2 (17.9)	71.8 (22.1)	75.0 (23.9)	74.2 (23.4)	68.2 (20.1)	56.6 (13.7)	45.9 (7.7)	38.6 (3.7)	55.9 (13.3)
Mean daily minimum °F (°C)	24.5 (−4.2)	26.7 (−2.9)	31.8 (−0.1)	40.5 (4.7)	50.4 (10.2)	59.3 (15.2)	62.9 (17.2)	61.9 (16.6)	54.9 (12.7)	41.8 (5.4)	31.8 (−0.1)	26.9 (−2.8)	42.8 (6.0)
Record low °F (°C)	−26 (−32)	−14 (−26)	1 (−17)	15 (−9)	20 (−7)	35 (2)	40 (4)	47 (8)	32 (0)	13 (−11)	11 (−12)	−6 (−21)	−26 (−32)
Average precipitation inches (mm)	4.12 (105)	4.46 (113)	4.64 (118)	4.64 (118)	4.10 (104)	3.75 (95)	5.05 (128)	3.84 (98)	3.33 (85)	2.69 (68)	3.36 (85)	4.55 (116)	48.53 (1,233)
Average snowfall inches (cm)	1.3 (3.3)	1.5 (3.8)	0.0 (0.0)	0.0 (0.0)	0.0 (0.0)	0.0 (0.0)	0.0 (0.0)	0.0 (0.0)	0.0 (0.0)	0.0 (0.0)	0.1 (0.25)	0.1 (0.25)	3.0 (7.6)
Average precipitation days (≥ 0.01 in)	9.8	9.7	11.1	9.8	10.3	10.5	10.7	8.4	7.2	6.9	8.4	10.4	113.2
Average snowy days (≥ 0.1 in)	0.7	0.6	0.1	0.0	0.0	0.0	0.0	0.0	0.0	0.0	0.1	0.2	1.7
Source 1: NOAA
Source 2: XMACIS2

== Demographics ==
Historical population
Census	Pop.	Note	%±
1910	1,328		—
1920	1,414		6.5%
1930	1,898		34.2%
1940	2,576		35.7%
1950	3,633		41.0%
1960	4,550		25.2%
1970	5,124		12.6%
1980	5,612		9.5%
1990	5,494		−2.1%
2000	7,760		41.2%
2010	8,047		3.7%
2020	8,419		4.6%
2025 (est.)	9,103	▲	8.1%

=== 2020 census ===
As of the 2020 census, 8,419 people and 1,703 families were residing in the city. The median age was 32.6 years; 19.5% of residents were under 18 and 17.0% were 65 or older. For every 100 females, there were 89.1 males, and for every 100 females 18 and over, there were 84.5 males.

About 97.2% of residents lived in urban areas, while 2.8% lived in rural areas.

Of the 3,078 households in Jefferson City, 29.6% had children under 18 living in them, 36.0% were married-couple households, 21.7% were households with a male householder and no spouse or partner present, and 34.6% were households with a female householder and no spouse or partner present. About 33.4% of all households were made up of individuals, and 12.8% had someone living alone who was 65 or older.

Of the 3,541 housing units, 13.1% were vacant. The homeowner vacancy rate was 1.4% and the rental vacancy rate was 12.3%.

Racial composition as of the 2020 census
Race	Number	Percentage
White	7,132	84.7%
Black or African American	309	3.7%
American Indian and Alaska Native	37	0.4%
Asian	86	1.0%
Native Hawaiian and other Pacific Islander	2	0.0%
Some other race	388	4.6%
Two or more races	465	5.5%
Hispanic or Latino (of any race)	692	8.2%

=== 2000 census ===
As of the 2000 census 7,760 people, 2,821 households and 1,692 families residied in the city. The population density was 1,464.0 inhabitants per square mile (565.3/km^{2}). The 3,155 housing units had an average density of 595.2 units per square mile (229.8 units/km^{2}). The racial makeup of the city was 89.99% White, 6.29% African American, 0.44% Native American, 0.76% Asian, 0.17% Pacific Islander, 1.15% from other races, and 1.21% from two or more races. Hispanics or Latinos of any race were 2.73% of the population.

Of the 2,821 households, 27.3% had children under 18 living with them, 42.9% were married couples living together, 13.6% had a female householder with no husband present, and 40.0% were not families. About 31.1% of all households were made up of individuals, and 10.6% had someone living alone who was 65 or older. The average household size was 2.29, and the average family size was 2.86.

In the city, the age distribution was 19.0% under 18, 25.6% from 18 to 24, 24.1% from 25 to 44, 16.9% from 45 to 64, and 14.3% who were 65 or older. The median age was 28 years. For every 100 females, there were 89.3 males. For every 100 females 18 and over, there were 84.6 males.

The median income in the city for a household was $25,911 and for a family was $33,964. Males had a median income of $28,306 versus $18,739 for females. The per capita income for the city was $13,770. About 19.7% of families and 24.7% of the population were below the poverty line, including 28.4% of those under 18 and 14.4% of those 65 or over.

== Government ==
=== Municipal ===
Jefferson City uses the council-manager government system, which was established in 1901 when the city was incorporated. It is governed by a five-member city council composed of the mayor and four council members.

=== State ===
Jefferson City is represented in the Tennessee House of Representatives in the 17th and 11th districts by Representatives Andrew Farmer and Jeremy Faison, respectively, both Republican.

In the Tennessee State Senate, Jefferson City is represented by the 8th district by Republican Frank Niceley.

=== Federal ===
Jefferson City is represented in the United States House of Representatives by Republican Tim Burchett of the 2nd congressional district.

== Education ==
=== Public schools ===
Public schools in Jefferson City are operated by the Jefferson County Department of Education. Elementary students attend Jefferson Elementary, middle school students attend Jefferson Middle, and high school students attend Jefferson County High School in neighboring Dandridge, along with other students in the Jefferson County Schools District.

=== Carson-Newman University ===
Carson-Newman University, a private Southern Baptist liberal arts university, is located in Jefferson City adjacent to its downtown district. It was founded in 1851, and has a student enrollment of over 2,500.

== Notable people ==
- Dana X. Bible, college football coach at Texas A & M, Nebraska, and Texas
- Mark Dean, inventor and computer scientist
- Phil Garner, ex-Major League Baseball player and manager
- Jim Henry, minority leader in the Tennessee House of Representatives from 1981 to 1986
- Kenneth Massey, American statistician
- Robert Edward Lee Mountcastle, a member of the Republican National Committee
- Carolyn Peck, former women's basketball coach, currently a basketball analyst at ESPN
- Herbert S. Walters, U.S. senator
- Clyde Wright, ex-Major League Baseball pitcher
