= Carson–Newman University =

Baptist university in Jefferson City, Tennessee, US

Coordinates: 36°07′19″N 83°29′32″W

Carson-Newman University
- Former names: Mossy Creek Missionary Baptist Seminary (1851–1880); Carson College (1880–1889); Newman College (1880–1889); Carson and Newman College (1889–1941); Carson-Newman College (1941–2012)
- Motto: Truth, Beauty, Goodness
- Type: Private university
- Established: 1851; 175 years ago
- Religious affiliation: Tennessee Baptist Mission Board
- Academic affiliations: CIC
- Endowment: $75.5 million (2024)
- President: Charles Fowler
- Faculty: 123 full-time 118 part-time (fall 2024)
- Administrative staff: 199
- Students: 2,669 (fall 2024)
- Undergraduates: 1,596 (fall 2024)
- Postgraduates: 1,073 (fall 2024)
- Location: Jefferson City, Tennessee, United States
- Campus: Suburban
- Colors: Orange & blue
- Nickname: Eagles
- Sporting affiliations: NCAA Division II – SAC
- Website: www.cn.edu
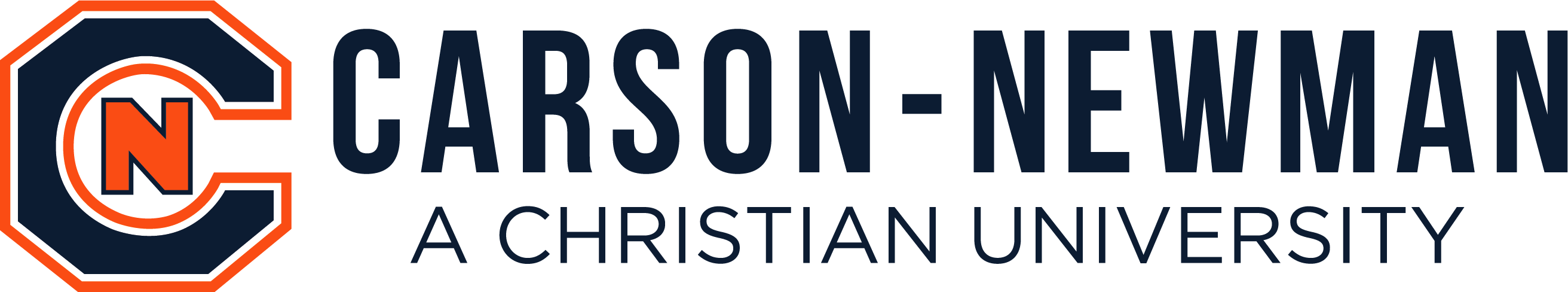

Carson-Newman University is a private university in Jefferson City, Tennessee, United States. Carson-Newman is affiliated with the Tennessee Baptist Mission Board. Founded in 1851, the university enrolls about 2,900 students. Studies are offered in approximately 90 different academic programs.

== History ==
Academic rankings

National
- U.S. News & World Report: 358 (tie) of 395

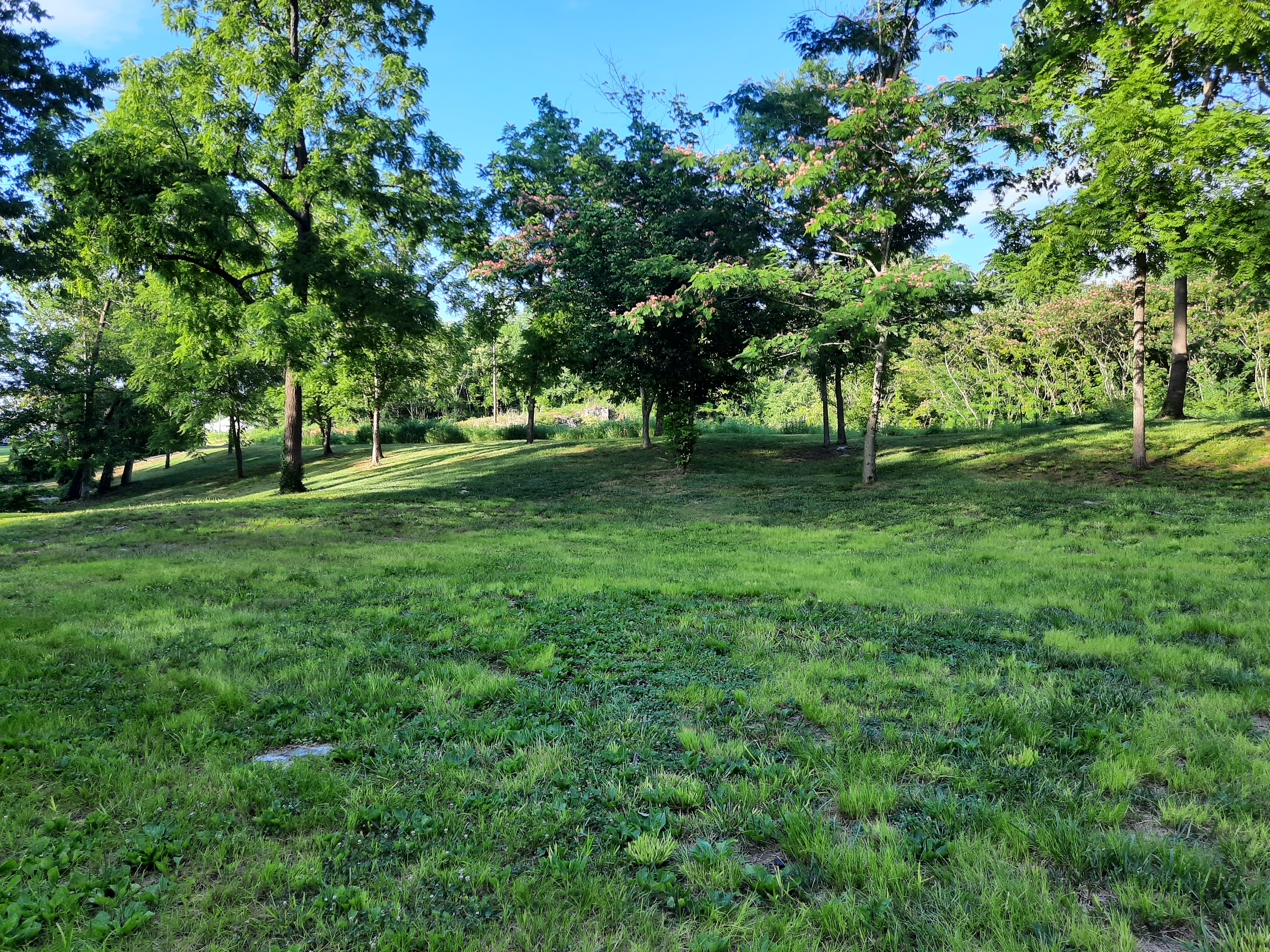
Location of Mossy Creek Baptist Church, site of first C-N classes in September 1851

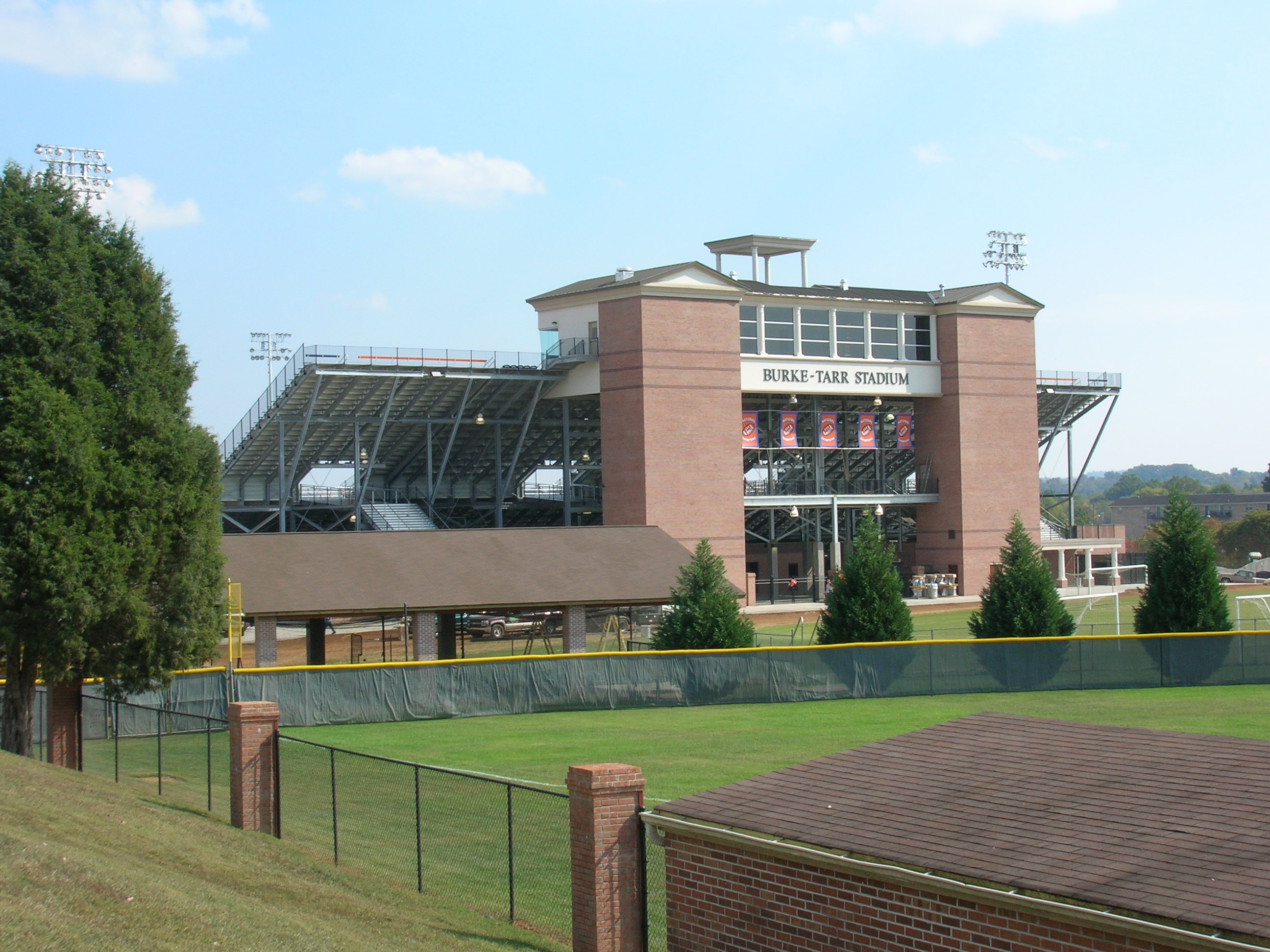
Burke–Tarr Stadium

Following a ten-year effort of five early East Tennessee Baptists, the school was established and chartered with the state of Tennessee as Mossy Creek Missionary Baptist Seminary in 1851, and construction began that summer on the first building on the west bank of the creek. While this was ongoing, the school held classes in a local Baptist church located near the old zinc mine on the current Allen and Phyllis Morgan East Campus. Within a year the school occupied its own building between the current Silver Diamond Baseball Complex and the East Campus. The campus gradually grew to the west, and is now a mile wide stretching across the northern end of Jefferson City.

In 1880, the institution was named Carson College for James Harvey Carson, who left $15,000 of his estate to the school. For several years it existed alongside Newman College, a separate facility for the education of women named for William Cate Newman, who had donated money to the women's college. In 1889, the two colleges united as one of the first coeducational institutions in the South. The institution operated as Carson-Newman College until 2012 when the board of trustees voted to acknowledge recent organizational changes by changing the name to Carson-Newman University.

In 1919, Carson-Newman became officially affiliated with the Tennessee Baptist Convention. The college was admitted to membership in the Southern Association of Colleges and Schools in 1927 and the Association of American Colleges in 1928.

During World War II, Carson-Newman was one of 131 colleges and universities nationally that took part in the V-12 Navy College Training Program which offered students a path to a Navy commission.

In 2015 the school applied for and received a Title IX exemption so that it could maintain its status as a private Christian institution and also granting it the right to turn away "gay students, unwed mothers, women who've had an abortion and even students who may be pregnant" should it so choose to do so. Then-President Randall O'Brien stated that the decision was made based on the advice of legal counsel and that the school does not discriminate and does not plan to.

Through an alumni donation in 2007, the university acquired an overgrown wooded area of land along Mossy Creek, known as a dead creek. The property was turned into a park called Allen and Phyllis Morgan East Campus. In Fall 2017, the creek started showing fresh signs of life once again. In 2019, the university completed construction on a 250-seat open air amphitheater on the East Campus.

On June 7, 2019, the trustees appointed Charles A. Fowler as the 23rd president of the university. Fowler began his tenure July 1, 2019.

=== Presidents ===
- Mossy Creek Missionary Baptist Seminary (1851–1859)
  - William Rogers (1851–1851)
  - R.R. Bryan (1851–1853)
  - Matthew Hillsman (1857–1859)
- Mossy Creek Baptist College (1866–1881)
  - R. R. Bryan (1866–1868)
  - Jesse Baker (1869–1870)
  - N.B. Goforth (1870–1881)
- Carson College and Newman College (1882–1889)
  - W.T. Russell (1882–1889) (Note: Russell was the first and only president of Newman College.)
  - W.A. Montgomery (1888–1892)
- Carson and Newman College (1889–1941)
  - W.A. Montgomery (1888–1892)
  - John T. Henderson (1892–1903)
  - M. D. Jeffries (1903–1912)
  - J.M. Burnett (1912–1917)
  - W. L. Gentry (1917–1919)
  - Oscar L. Sams (1920–1927)
  - James T. Warren (1927–1948)
- Carson-Newman College (1941–2012)
  - James T. Warren (1927–1948)
  - I.N. Carr (interim, 1948)
  - D. Harley Fite (1948–1968)
  - John A. Fincher (1968–1977)
  - J. Cordell Maddox (1977–2000)
  - James S. Netherton (2000–2007)
  - Joe Bill Sloan (interim, 2007–2008) (Note: Sloan was appointed interim President after Netherton's departure to serve as Executive Vice President for Administration and Finance at Mercer University in May 2007. Netherton left following a no-confidence vote of faculty)
  - J. Randall O'Brien (2008–2012)
- Carson-Newman University (2012–present)
  - J. Randall O'Brien (2012–2018)
  - Paul Percy (interim, 2019) (Note: Percy was named interim President after O'Brien's retirement in 2018)
  - Charles A. Fowler (2019–present)

== Athletics ==
Carson-Newman is a member of the South Atlantic Conference (SAC) and fields 21 varsity teams in National Collegiate Athletic Association (NCAA) Division II competition. Men's varsity sports at Carson-Newman are: baseball, basketball, cross country, football, golf, soccer, swimming, tennis, and track & field (indoor and outdoor). Women's sports are: basketball, beach volleyball, cross country, golf, soccer, softball, swimming, tennis, track & field (indoor and outdoor), and volleyball.
