= List of Gardner–Webb Runnin' Bulldogs football seasons =

The following is a list of seasons completed by the Gardner–Webb Runnin' Bulldogs football team. The Bulldogs compete in the Big South–OVC Football Association of the NCAA Division I FCS. Since the program's inception in 1970, Gardner–Webb has claimed five conference championships, including three in the Big South. The Bulldogs have had eleven head coaches in their history, including current head coach Cris Reisert. The Bulldogs play their home games out of 9,000-seat Ernest W. Spangler Stadium, as they have since 1969.

== Seasons ==
Legend

^{†} Conference champions
^{‡} Division champions
Bowl game berth
Playoff berth

List of Gardner–Webb Runnin' Bulldogs football seasons
Season	Team	Head coach	Conference	Division	Regular season results							Postseason results	Final ranking	
Season	Team	Head coach	Conference	Division	Overall			Conference				Bowl game/Playoff result	TSN/STATS Poll	Coaches' Poll
Season	Team	Head coach	Conference	Division	Win	Loss	Tie	Win	Loss	Tie	Finish	Bowl game/Playoff result	TSN/STATS Poll	Coaches' Poll
Gardner–Webb Runnin' Bulldogs
1970	1970	George Litton	NAIA Independent	—	2	8	0					—	—	—
1971	1971	George Litton	NAIA Independent	—	3	7	0					—	—	—
1972	1972	George Litton	NAIA Independent	—	2	8	0					—	—	—
1973	1973	George Litton	NAIA Independent	—	7	5	0					—	—	—
1974	1974	George Litton	NAIA Independent	—	2	5	1					—	—	—
1975	1975	Oval Jaynes	South Atlantic	—	1	7	0	1	5	0	8th	—	—	—
1976	1976	Oval Jaynes	South Atlantic	—	5	5	0	3	4	0	5th	—	—	—
1977	1977	Oval Jaynes	South Atlantic	—	7	4	0	5	2	0	2nd	—	—	—
1978	1978	Billy Kinard	South Atlantic	—	4	5	1	2	5	0	5th	—	—	—
1979	1979	Tom Moore	South Atlantic	—	2	9	0	1	6	0	8th	—	—	—
1980	1980	Tom Moore	South Atlantic	—	3	7	0	2	5	0	7th	—	—	—
1981	1981	Tom Moore	South Atlantic	—	5	5	0	3	4	0	4th	—	—	—
1982	1982	Tom Moore	South Atlantic	—	7	3	0	5	2	0	2nd	—	—	—
1983	1983	Ellis Johnson	South Atlantic	—	5	6	0	4	3	0	3rd	—	—	—
1984	1984	Woody Fish	South Atlantic	—	4	6	0	2	5	0	6th	—	—	—
1985	1985	Woody Fish	South Atlantic	—	6	5	0	2	5	0	6th	—	—	—
1986	1986	Woody Fish	South Atlantic	—	6	5	0	4	3	0	3rd	—	—	—
1987	1987^{†}	Woody Fish	South Atlantic	—	11	2	0	6	1	0	1st^{†}	NAIA Playoffs – Quarterfinal	—	—
1986	1988	Woody Fish	South Atlantic	—	4	6	1	2	5	0	6th	—	—	—
1989	1989	Woody Fish	South Atlantic	—	7	4	0	4	3	0	2nd	—	—	—
1990	1990	Woody Fish	South Atlantic	—	2	8	0	2	5	0	6th	—	—	—
1991	1991	Woody Fish	South Atlantic	—	6	5	0	3	4	0	4th	—	—	—
1992	1992^{†}	Woody Fish	South Atlantic	—	12	2	0	7	0	0	1st^{†}	NAIA Playoffs – Runner-Up	—	—
1993	1993	Woody Fish	South Atlantic	—	1	9	0	0	7	0	8th	—	—	—
1994	1994	Woody Fish	South Atlantic	—	5	6	0	3	4	0	5th	—	—	—
1995	1995	Woody Fish	South Atlantic	—	6	4	0	4	3	0	3rd	—	—	—
1996	1996	Woody Fish	South Atlantic	—	2	9	0	2	5	0	6th	—	—	—
1997	1997	Steve Patton	South Atlantic	—	8	3	0	4	3	0	3rd	—	—	—
1998 (Note: Overtime rules were added to NAIA college football in 1998, thereby eliminating ties.)	1998	Steve Patton	South Atlantic	—	6	5		4	3		3rd	—	—	—
1999	1999	Steve Patton	South Atlantic	—	7	4		4	4		4th	—	—	—
2000	2000	Steve Patton	I-AA Independent	—	7	4						—	—	—
2001	2001	Steve Patton	I-AA Independent	—	6	4						—	—	—
2002	2002^{†}	Steve Patton	Big South	—	9	1		3	0		1st^{†}	—	22	24
2003	2003^{†}	Steve Patton	Big South	—	8	4		4	0		1st^{†}	—	—	—
2004	2004	Steve Patton	Big South	—	5	6		2	2		3rd	—	—	—
2005	2005	Steve Patton	Big South	—	5	6		2	2		3rd	—	—	—
2006	2006	Steve Patton	Big South	—	6	5		2	2		2nd	—	—	—
2007	2007	Steve Patton	Big South	—	5	6		2	2		3rd	—	—	—
2008	2008	Steve Patton	Big South	—	5	6		2	3		4th	—	—	—
2009	2009	Steve Patton	Big South	—	6	5		3	3		4th	—	—	—
2010	2010	Steve Patton	Big South	—	5	6		3	3		4th	—	—	—
2011	2011	Ron Dickerson, Jr.	Big South	—	4	7		2	4		5th	—	—	—
2012	2012	Ron Dickerson, Jr.	Big South	—	3	8		2	4		4th	—	—	—
2013	2013	Carroll McCray	Big South	—	7	5		2	3		4th	—	—	—
2014	2014	Carroll McCray	Big South	—	4	8		0	5		6th	—	—	—
2015	2015	Carroll McCray	Big South	—	4	7		2	4		5th	—	—	—
2016	2016	Carroll McCray	Big South	—	5	6		3	2		3rd	—	—	—
2017	2017	Carroll McCray	Big South	—	1	10		0	5		6th	—	—	—
2018	2018	Carroll McCray	Big South	—	3	8		2	3		4th	—	—	—
2019	2019	Carroll McCray	Big South	—	3	9		1	6		5th	—	—	—
2020 (Note: The Fall 2020 Big South season was delayed due to the COVID-19 pandemic, with league play resuming in a shortened Spring 2021 season.)	2020	Tre Lamb	Big South	—	2	2		0	2		6th	—	—	—
2021	2021	Tre Lamb	Big South	—	4	7		2	5		9th	—	—	—
2022	2022^{†}	Tre Lamb	Big South	—	7	6		5	0		1st^{†}	NCAA Division I – Second Round	—	—
2022	2023^{†}	Tre Lamb	Big South–OVC	—	7	5		5	1		T–1st^{†}	NCAA Division I – First Round	—	—
2024	2024	Cris Reisert	Big South–OVC	—	4	8		3	5		T–6th	—	—	—
2025	2025	Cris Reisert	Big South–OVC	—	7	5		5	3		T–3rd	—	—	—
Totals					All-time: 269–310–3 (.465)			Conference: 136–165 (.452)			–	Playoffs: 4–4 (.500)	–	–
