= 1985 Hillsdale Chargers football team =

American college football season

1985 Hillsdale Chargers football

NAIA Division I co-national champion

NAIA Division I Football Championship, T 10–10 vs. Central Arkansas
- Conference: Great Lakes Intercollegiate Athletic Conference
- Record: 11–1–1 (5–1 GLIAC)
- Head coach: Dick Lowry (6th season)
- Defensive coordinator: Dave Dye (6th season)
- Home stadium: Frank "Muddy" Waters Stadium

1985 Great Lakes Intercollegiate Athletic Conference football standings
	Conf.					Overall
Team	W		L		T	W		L		T
No. 2 Hillsdale $^	5	–	1	–	0	11	–	1	–	1
Saginaw Valley State	4	–	1	–	1	4	–	5	–	1
Ferris State	4	–	2	–	0	6	–	4	–	0
Grand Valley State	4	–	2	–	0	0	–	6	–	5
Northwood	2	–	3	–	1	3	–	4	–	2
Wayne State (MI)	1	–	5	–	0	1	–	8	–	1
Michigan Tech	0	–	6	–	0	1	–	9	–	0
$ – Conference champion; ^ – NAIA Division I playoff participant; Rankings from NAIA Division I poll

The 1985 Hillsdale Chargers football team was an American football team that represented Hillsdale College in the 1985 NAIA Division I football season. In their sixth year under head coach Dick Lowry, the Chargers compiled an 11–1–1 record and won the NAIA national co-championship. In the national championship game, played on December 21, in Conway, Arkansas, Hillsdale and Central Arkansas played to a 10–10 tie, resulting in a split national championship. The national title was a first for Hillsdale.

== Schedule ==
Date	Opponent	Site	Result	Attendance	Source
September 14	at Wisconsin–Whitewater*	Perkins Stadium; Whitewater, WI	W 21–7		
September 21	Ashland*	Frank "Muddy" Waters Stadium; Hillsdale, MI	W 23–7		
September 28	Saginaw Valley	Frank "Muddy" Waters Stadium; Hillsdale, MI	L 17–28	5,792	
October 5	at Wayne State (MI)	Detroit, MI	W 25–0	868	
October 12	Ferris State	Frank "Muddy" Waters Stadium; Hillsdale, MI	W 24–15		
October 19	at Grand Valley State	Lubbers Stadium; Allendale, MI	W 21–14	3,550	
October 26	Kentucky State*	Frank "Muddy" Waters Stadium; Hillsdale, MI	W 42–0	2,100	
November 2	Michigan Tech	Frank "Muddy" Waters Stadium; Hillsdale, MI	W 52–6	3,522	
November 9	at Northwood	Midland, MI	W 30–0	500	
November 16	at Central State (OH)*	Xenia, OH	W 16–6	3,350	
December 7	Salem*	Frank "Muddy" Waters Stadium; Hillsdale, MI (NAIA Division I Quarterfinal)	W 47–3	2,200	
December 14	at Mesa State*	Grand Junction, CO (NAIA Division I Semifinal)	W 24–21 ^{OT}	3,680	
December 21	at Central Arkansas*	Estes Stadium; Conway, AR (Champion Bowl)	T 10–10	4,174	
*Non-conference game
