= Billy Joe (American football) =

American football player and coach (born 1940)

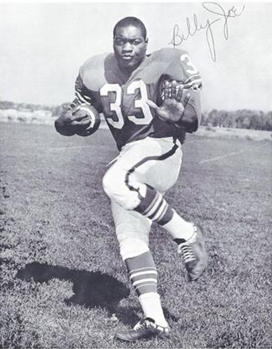

No. 18, 3, 33, 35
- Position: Running back

Personal information
- Born: October 14, 1940 (age 86); Aynor, South Carolina, U.S.
- Listed height: 6 ft 2 in (1.88 m)
- Listed weight: 235 lb (107 kg)

Career information
- College: Villanova
- NFL draft: 1963: 9th round, 119th overall pick
- AFL draft: 1963: 11th round, 85th overall pick

Career history

Playing
- Denver Broncos (1963–1964); Buffalo Bills (1965); Miami Dolphins (1966); Waterbury Orbits (1967); New York Jets (1967–1969)

Coaching
- Cheyney (1970) Assistant coach; Maryland (1971) Assistant coach; Cheyney (1972–1978) Head coach; Philadelphia Eagles (1979–1980) Running backs coach; Central State (OH) (1981–1993) Head coach; Florida A&M (1994–2004) Head coach; Miles (2008–2010) Head coach

Awards and highlights
- Super Bowl champion (III); 2× AFL champion (1965, 1968); AFL All-Star (1965); AFL Rookie of the Year (1963); NAIA Division I Coach of the Year (1992); 3× MEAC Coach of the Year (1995–1996, 2001); Second-team All-East (1962)

Career AFL statistics
- Rushing yards: 2,010
- Rushing average: 3.7
- Receptions: 77
- Receiving yards: 589
- Total touchdowns: 19
- Stats at Pro Football Reference

Head coaching record
- Career: 245–157–4 (.608)
- College Football Hall of Fame

William Joe (born October 14, 1940) is an American former professional football player and coach. He played as a running back in the American Football League (AFL).

== Playing career ==
Joe was the American Football League Rookie of the Year in 1963 with the AFL's Denver Broncos. In 1965, he was traded to the Buffalo Bills for their legendary fullback, Cookie Gilchrist, and made the AFL All-Star Team, starting for the Bills in their 1965 AFL Championship victory over the San Diego Chargers.

== Coaching career ==
Before becoming a head coach, his tenure as an assistant coach included a year at Maryland in 1971, making him the first African-American coach in the Atlantic Coast Conference.

Joe later was a successful college head coach for 33 seasons. He coached at Cheyney University of Pennsylvania from 1972 to 1978, Central State University from 1981 to 1993, Florida A&M University from 1994 to 2004, and Miles College from 2008 to 2010. Joe achieved his greatest success at Central State, where his teams won two NAIA National Football Championships, in 1990 and 1992, and made many appearances in the NAIA football playoffs during the 1980s and 1990s. His teams at Florida A&M made various appearances in the Division I-AA (now FCS) playoffs during the 1990s and early 2000s.

In addition, Joe won five straight black college football national championships with Central State University (1986–1990) and one with Florida A&M (1998). In 2007, he was inducted into the College Football Hall of Fame as a coach.

Players coached by Joe who went on to the NFL/CFL/Arena League are:

- Central State University: Vince Buck, Vince Heflin, Erik Williams and Hugh Douglas
- Florida A&M: Jamie Brown, Jamie Nails, Terry Mickens, Dexter Nottage, Wally Williams, Earl Holmes, Robert Wilson, Tony Bland, and Quinn Gray

After a two-season absence as a coach, Joe was named head football coach at Miles College, an NCAA Division II school in Fairfield, Alabama on December 12, 2007. He resigned in October 2010, citing poor health. Assistant coach Patrick Peasant took over the team on an interim basis.

He finished his college coaching career with a record of 245–157–4. His number of victories are second only to Eddie Robinson among coaches at historically black colleges and universities.

== AFL career statistics ==
Legend
	Won the Super Bowl
	Won the AFL championship
**Bold**	Career high

=== Regular season ===
Year	Team	Games		Rushing					Receiving				
Year	Team	GP	GS	Att	Yds	Avg	Lng	TD	Rec	Yds	Avg	Lng	TD
1963	DEN	14	13	**154**	**646**	4.2	**68**	**4**	15	90	6.0	34	1
1964	DEN	14	12	112	415	3.7	51	2	12	16	1.3	15	0
1965	BUF	14	12	123	377	3.1	30	**4**	**27**	**271**	10.0	**78**	**2**
1966	MIA	14	7	71	232	3.3	14	0	13	116	8.9	67	1
1967	NYJ	11	1	37	154	4.2	26	2	8	85	**10.6**	17	0
1968	NYJ	10	0	42	186	**4.4**	32	3	2	11	5.5	11	0
1969	NYJ	1	0	0	0	0.0	0	0	0	0	0.0	0	0
Career		78	45	539	2,010	3.7	68	15	77	589	7.6	78	4

=== Regular season ===
Year	Team	Games		Rushing					Receiving				
Year	Team	GP	GS	Att	Yds	Avg	Lng	TD	Rec	Yds	Avg	Lng	TD
1965	BUF	1	1	16	35	2.2	11	0	0	0	0.0	0	0
Career		1	1	16	35	2.2	11	0	0	0	0.0	0	0

== Head coaching record ==
Year	Team	Overall	Conference	Standing	Bowl/playoffs
**Cheyney Wolves** (Pennsylvania State Athletic Conference) (1972–1978)
1972	Cheyney	6–3	2–3	5th (Eastern)	
1973	Cheyney	5–4	3–2	4th (Eastern)	
1974	Cheyney	5–4	2–4	5th (Eastern)	
1975	Cheyney	4–6	2–4	6th (Eastern)	
1976	Cheyney	1–7	1–5	6th (Eastern)	
1977	Cheyney	4–5	1–4	6th (Eastern)	
1978	Cheyney	6–3	4–1	2nd (Eastern)	
Cheyney:		31–32	15–23		
**Central State Marauders** (NCAA Division II independent) (1981–1986)
1981	Central State	4–7			
1982	Central State	7–4			
1983	Central State	12–1			**L** NCAA Division II Championship
1984	Central State	9–2			**L** NCAA Division II First Round
1985	Central State	8–3			**L** NCAA Division II First Round
1986	Central State	10–1–1			**L** NCAA Division II Semifinal
**Central State Marauders** (NAIA Division I independent) (1987–1993)
1987	Central State	10–1–1			**L** NAIA Division I First Round
1988	Central State	11–2			**L** NAIA Division I Semifinal
1989	Central State	10–3			**L** NAIA Division I Semifinal
1990	Central State	10–1			**W** NAIA Division I Championship
1991	Central State	11–2			**L** NAIA Division I Championship
1992	Central State	12–1			**W** NAIA Division I Championship
1993	Central State	8–1–2			**L** NAIA Division I Semifinal
Central State:		120–30–4			
**Florida A&M Rattlers** (Mid-Eastern Athletic Conference) (1994–2003)
1994	Florida A&M	6–5	2–4	T–5th	
1995	Florida A&M	9–3	6–0	1st	**L** Heritage
1996	Florida A&M	9–3	7–0	1st	**L** NCAA Division I-AA First Round
1997	Florida A&M	9–3	5–2	T–2nd	**L** NCAA Division I-AA First Round
1998	Florida A&M	11–2	7–1	T–1st	**L** NCAA Division I-AA Quarterfinal
1999	Florida A&M	11–4	7–1	2nd	**L** NCAA Division I-AA Semifinal
2000	Florida A&M	9–3	7–1	1st	**L** NCAA Division I-AA First Round
2001	Florida A&M	7–4	7–1	1st	**L** NCAA Division I-AA First Round
2002	Florida A&M	7–5	5–3	T–2nd	
2003	Florida A&M	6–6	3–4	6th	
**Florida A&M Rattlers** (NCAA Division I-AA independent) (2004)
2004	Florida A&M	3–8			
Florida A&M:		86–46	56–17		
**Miles Golden Bears** (Southern Intercollegiate Athletic Conference) (2008–2010)
2008	Miles	2–8	2–7	T–8th	
2009	Miles	4–7	3–6	T–7th	
2010	Miles	2–4			
Miles:		8–19			
Total:		245–157–4			

== See also ==
- List of college football career coaching wins leaders
