= List of Gardner–Webb Runnin' Bulldogs in the NFL draft =

This is a list of Gardner–Webb Runnin' Bulldogs football players in the NFL draft.

== Key ==
B	Back	K	Kicker	NT	Nose tackle
C	Center	LB	Linebacker	FB	Fullback
DB	Defensive back	P	Punter	HB	Halfback
DE	Defensive end	QB	Quarterback	WR	Wide receiver
DT	Defensive tackle	RB	Running back	G	Guard
E	End	T	Offensive tackle	TE	Tight end

= Pro Bowler
= Hall of Famer

== Selections ==
Year	Round	Pick	Player	Team	Position
1982	8	223	Ralph Warthen	Washington Redskins	DT
1982	12	329	Tony Suber	Buffalo Bills	DT
1994	4	126	Gabe Wilkins	Green Bay Packers	DT
1996	5	165	Terry Guess	New Orleans Saints	WR
2008	7	210	Brian Johnston	Kansas City Chiefs	DE
