= Woody Fish =

American football player, coach, and college administrator

Current position
- Title: Assistant VP of Development for Athletics
- Team: Gardner–Webb
- Conference: Big South

Playing career
- 1971–1973: Gardner–Webb
- Position: Linebacker

Coaching career (HC unless noted)
- 1975–1979: Pisgah HS (NC) (assistant)
- 1980–1983: Bessemer City HS (NC)
- 1984–1996: Gardner–Webb
- 1999–2000: Pisgah HS (NC)
- 2001–2006: Duke (def. asst.)

Administrative career (AD unless noted)
- 2006–2017: Gardner–Webb
- 2017–present: Gardner–Webb

Head coaching record
- Overall: 72–71–1 (college)
- Tournaments: 3–2 (NAIA D-I playoffs)

Accomplishments and honors

Championships
- 2 SAC (1987, 1992)

H. Woodrow Fish is an American college administrator and former American football player and coach. He currently serves as the Assistant Vice-President of Development for Athletics at Gardner–Webb University in Boiling Springs, North Carolina. Fish was the head football coach at Gardner–Webb from 1984 to 1996, compiling a record of 72–71–1.

== Head coaching record ==
=== College ===
Year	Team	Overall	Conference	Standing	Bowl/playoffs
Gardner–Webb Runnin' Bulldogs (South Atlantic Conference) (1984–1996)
1984	Gardner–Webb	4–6	2–5	6th	
1985	Gardner–Webb	6–5	2–5	T–6th	
1986	Gardner–Webb	6–5	4–3	T–3rd	
1987	Gardner–Webb	11–2	6–1	1st	L NAIA Division I Quarterfinal
1988	Gardner–Webb	4–6–1	2–5	T–6th	
1989	Gardner–Webb	7–4	4–3	T–3rd	
1990	Gardner–Webb	2–8	2–5	T–6th	
1991	Gardner–Webb	6–5	3–4	T–4th	
1992	Gardner–Webb	12–2	7–0	1st	L NAIA Division I Championship
1993	Gardner–Webb	2–8	0–7	8th	
1994	Gardner–Webb	5–6	3–4	5th	
1995	Gardner–Webb	6–4	4–3	T–3rd	
1996	Gardner–Webb	2–9	2–5	T–6th	
Gardner–Webb:		72–71–1	41–50		
Total:		72–71–1			
National championship Conference title Conference division title or championship game berth
