= Harold Horton =

American football player and coach (14 Nov 1939–3 May 2025)

Biographical details
- Born: 1939 or 1940; DeWitt, Arkansas, U.S.
- Died: May 3, 2025 (aged 85); Fayetteville, Arkansas, U.S.
- Education: University of Arkansas

Playing career
- 1959–1961: Arkansas
- Position: Defensive back

Coaching career (HC unless noted)
- 1962–1964: Bald Knob HS (AR)
- 1965–1967: Forrest City HS (AR)
- 1968: Arkansas (freshmen)
- 1969–1976: Arkansas (LB)
- 1977–1980: Arkansas (DL)
- 1982–1989: Central Arkansas

Administrative career (AD unless noted)
- 1990–2000: Arkansas (administrative football operations)
- 2001–2012: Razorback Foundation (president)

Head coaching record
- Overall: 74–12–5 (college); 41–18–5 (high school)
- Tournaments: 6–5–2 (NAIA D-I playoffs)

Accomplishments and honors

Championships
- 2 NAIA Division I (1984–1985); 7 AIC (1983–1989)

Awards
- NAIA Division I Coach of the Year (1983)

Harold Horton (Nov 14, 1939 – May 3, 2025) was an American college football player and coach. He served as the head football coach at the University of Central Arkansas (UCA) from 1982 to 1989.

Horton played collegiately at the University of Arkansas from 1959 to 1961 under head coach Frank Broyles, after graduating from DeWitt High School in DeWitt, Arkansas. He was a part of Razorback teams that won or shared Southwest Conference (SWC) championships in each of his three seasons, as well as winning the 1960 Gator Bowl.

After graduation Horton served in the Army stationed at Fort Chaffe in Fort Smith, AR before becoming the head football coach at Bald Knob High School in Bald Knob, Arkansas. After three successful seasons he was hired as the head football coach at Forrest City High School in Forrest City, Arkansas. He returned to the University of Arkansas in 1968 as an assistant coach under Broyles and then Lou Holtz until 1980. At Arkansas, Horton coached and recruited some of the greatest players to ever play for the Hogs and coached in the Sugar Bowl three times, the Cotton Bowl, Orange Bowl, Fiesta Bowl, Liberty Bowl, and the Hall of Fame Bowl. In fact, Horton is the only coach in Hog football history to have won all three of the Hogs' biggest bowls: the Sugar Bowl, Cotton Bowl and Orange Bowl.

After a short stint in private business, Horton was hired in July 1982 as the head football coach at the University of Central Arkansas in Conway, Arkansas. In his eight seasons at UCA, he went 74-12-5 and 45-3-2 in league play. He won back to back NAIA Division 1 National Championships in 1984 and 1985. His Bears won seven consecutive AIC championships from 1983 to 1989. His teams won 38 regular season games in a row and he had three teams go undefeated in the regular season. Horton won the 1983 NAIA National Coach of the Year award. He is the winningest head coach (81.3%) in Arkansas college football history. He won 90% of his conference games at UCA.

Horton left UCA after the 1989 season and returned to the University of Arkansas in 1990 as an administrator for the athletics department and football operations. He was replaced as head football coach at UCA by his assistant, Mike Isom. From 2001 to 2012, he served as President of the Razorback Foundation.

Horton was an inductee of the Arkansas Sports Hall of Fame, the University of Arkansas Sports Hall of Honor, and the University of Central Arkansas Sports Hall of Fame.

Horton was the father of Air Force Academy running backs coach and special teams coordinator Tim Horton, who also played for Arkansas as a wide receiver from 1986 to 1989, winning two SWC championships of his own in 1988 and 1989.

Harold Horton died in Fayetteville, Arkansas on May 3, 2025, at the age of 85.

== Head coaching record ==
=== College ===
Year	Team	Overall	Conference	Standing	Bowl/playoffs
Central Arkansas Bears (Arkansas Intercollegiate Conference) (1982–1989)
1982	Central Arkansas	4–2–3	3–1–2	2nd	
1983	Central Arkansas	11–1	6–0	1st	L NAIA Division I Semifinal
1984	Central Arkansas	10–2–1	6–0	1st	T NAIA Division I Championship
1985	Central Arkansas	10–2–1	6–1	T–1st	T NAIA Division I Championship
1986	Central Arkansas	9–2	7–0	1st	L NAIA Division I Quarterfinal
1987	Central Arkansas	11–1	6–0	1st	L NAIA Division I Quarterfinal
1988	Central Arkansas	10–1	6–0	1st	L NAIA Division I First Round
1989	Central Arkansas	9–1	5–1	T–1st	
Central Arkansas:		74–12–5	45–3–2		
Total:		74–12–5			
National championship Conference title Conference division title or championship game berth
