= Richard Lowry =

Richard Lowry may refer to:

- Richard Lowry (psychologist) (born 1940), American psychologist
- Rich Lowry (born 1968), American writer
- Dick Lowry (American football) (Richard B. Lowry, born 1935), American football coach

== See also ==
- Dick Lowry (born 1944), American director and film producer
