= 1990 Central State Marauders football team =

American college football season

1990 Central State Marauders football

NAIA Division I national champion Black college national champion

NAIA Division I Championship, W 38–16 vs. Mesa State
- Conference: Independent
- Record: 10–1
- Head coach: Billy Joe (10th season)
- Home stadium: McPherson Stadium

1990 NAIA Division I independents football records
	Conf.			Overall
Team	W	L	T	W		L		T
No. 2 Central State (OH) ^		–		10	–	1	–	0
Arkansas–Pine Bluff		–		9	–	1	–	0
No. 3 Western New Mexico ^		–		8	–	2	–	0
No. 8 Fort Hays State ^		–		8	–	4	–	0
No. 14 Emporia State		–		6	–	4	–	0
West Virginia Wesleyan		–		5	–	5	–	0
Langston		–		4	–	5	–	0
^ – NAIA Division I playoff participant; Rankings from NAIA Division I poll

The 1990 Central State Marauders football team represented Central State University as an independent during the 1990 NAIA Division I football season. Led by tenth-year head coach Billy Joe, the Marauders compiled an overall record of 10–1 and finished as NAIA Division I national champions. At the conclusion of the season, the Marauders were also recognized as black college national champion.

== Schedule ==
Date	Opponent	Site	Result	Attendance	Source
September 1	Morgan State	McPherson Stadium; Wilberforce, OH	W 63–13	2,800	
September 22	at St. Francis (IL)	Memorial Stadium; Joliet, IL	W 39–6		
September 29	vs. Tennessee State	Cardinal Stadium; Louisville, KY (River City Classic)	W 35–14	28,942	
October 6	vs. Northeast Missouri State	Cooper Stadium; Columbus, OH (Capitol Classic)	L 42–43	4,000	
October 21	Knoxville^{†}	McPherson Stadium; Wilberforce, OH	W 70–44	6,000	
October 27	at Bowie State	Bulldogs Stadium; Bowie, MD	W 56–7	4,475	
November 3	Kentucky State	McPherson Stadium; Wilberforce, OH	W 69–14		
November 10	West Virginia State	McPherson Stadium; Wilberforce, OH	W 64–14		
November 17	at Fort Hays State	Lewis Field Stadium; Hays, KS (NAIA Division I Quarterfinal)	W 48–10		
December 1	at Carson–Newman	Burke–Tarr Stadium; Jefferson City, TN (NAIA Division I Semifinal)	W 41–14	3,676	
December 8	at Mesa State	Ralph Stocker Stadium; Grand Junction, CO (NAIA Division I Championship)	W 38–16	6,575	
^{†}Homecoming
