= Central State Marauders football =

- First season: 1947; 79 years ago
- Head coach: Tony Carter; 1st season, 3–7 (.300)
- Location: Wilberforce, Ohio
- Stadium: McPherson Stadium (capacity: 7,000)
- NCAA division: Division II
- Conference: SIAC
- Colors: Maroon and gold

NAIA national championships
- NAIA Division I: 1990, 1992, 1995

Black college national championships
- 1948, 1983, 1986, 1987, 1988, 1989, 1990, 1992
- Website: maraudersports.com

The Central State Marauders football team represents Central State University, located in Wilberforce, Ohio, in NCAA Division II college football. Under prior university names and nicknames, the team was previously known as the Wilberforce State Green Wave and the Central State Green Wave.

The Marauders, who began playing football in 1947, compete as members of the Great Midwest Athletic Conference.

== History ==
Central State experienced much success in Division II and NAIA during the 1980s through 1995 under then head football coaches, William "Billy" Joe (1981 to 1993) and Rick Comegy (1993 to 1996).

Under Billy Joe, the Marauders were NCAA Division II runners-up in 1983 and won the NAIA Football National Championship (Division I) in 1990 and 1992. Under Comegy, a former assistant coach under Joe, the Marauders won the NAIA Football National Championship (Division I) in 1995. The heyday of Central State football ended in the late 1990s when the university administration was forced to drop the football program in 1997 due to financial difficulties and a significant drop of enrollment. In 2005, under new administration leadership of president Dr. John W. Garland, Esq, (Class of 1971), the university reinstated the Central State Marauder football program.

=== Conferences ===
- 1947–1970: Midwest Athletic Association
- 1971–1986: NCAA Division II independent
- 1987–1996: NAIA independent
- 1997–2005: Discontinued
- 2005: NCAA Division II independent
- 2006–2009: Great Lakes Football Conference
- 2010–2011: NCAA Division II independent
- 2012: Great Midwest Athletic Conference
- 2013–present: Southern Intercollegiate Athletic Conference

== Championships ==
=== National championships ===
Year	Association	Division	Head coach	Record	Opponent	Result
1948	Black college		Gaston F. Lewis	9–1–1 (3–0 MAA)	—	
1983	Black college		Billy Joe	12–1	—	
1986	Black college		Billy Joe	10–1–1	—	
1987	Black college		Billy Joe	10–1–1	—	
1988	Black college		Billy Joe	11–2	—	
1989	Black college		Billy Joe	10–3	—	
1990	NAIA	Division I	Billy Joe	10–1	Mesa State	W, 38–16
1990	Black college		Billy Joe	10–1	—	
1992	NAIA	Division I	Billy Joe	12–1	Gardner–Webb	W, 19–16
1992	Black college		Billy Joe	12–1	—	
1995	NAIA	Division I	Rick Comegy	10–1	Northeastern State	W, 37–7

== Postseason appearances ==
=== NCAA Division II ===
The Marauders have made five appearances in the NCAA Division II playoffs, with a combined record of 3–4.

Year	Round	Opponent	Result
1983	Quarterfinals; Semifinals; National Championship	Southwest Texas State; North Alabama; North Dakota State	W, 24–16; W, 27–24; L, 21–41
1984	Quarterfinals	Troy State	L, 21–31
1985	Quarterfinals	South Dakota	L, 10–13 ^{2OT}
1986	Quarterfinals; Semifinals	Towson State; North Dakota State	W, 31–0; L, 12–35
2026	First Round	UNC Pembroke	TBP

=== NAIA ===
The Marauders made nine appearances in the NAIA playoffs, with a combined record of 14–6 and three national championships.

Year	Round	Opponent	Result
1987	First Round	Carson–Newman	L, 13–26
1988	First Round; Quarterfinals; Semifinals	Catawba; Hillsdale; Carson–Newman	W, 24–10; W, 14–7; L, 0–13
1989	Quarterfinals; Semifinals	Moorhead State; Carson–Newman	W, 56–7; L, 17–20
1990	Quarterfinals; Semifinals; National Championship	Fort Hays State; Carson–Newman; Mesa State	W, 48–10; W, 41–14; W, 10–9
1991	Quarterfinals; Semifinals; National Championship	Shepherd; Western State (CO); Central Arkansas	W, 34–22; W, 20–13; L, 16–19
1992	Quarterfinals; Semifinals; National Championship	Harding; Central Arkansas; Gardner–Webb	W, 34–0; W, 30–23; W, 19–16
1993	Quarterfinals; Semifinals	Winona State; Glenville State	W, 58–7; L, 12–13
1994	Quarterfinals	Arkansas–Pine Bluff	L, 14–21
1995	Semifinals; National Championship	Montana Western; Northeastern State	W, 49–21; W, 37–7

== Notable players ==
Notable Marauder alumni who went on to play in the National Football League include:

- Vince Heflin
- Vince Buck
- Erik Williams
- Hugh Douglas
- Charles Hope
- Brandon Hayes
- Mel Lunsford
- Kerwin Waldroup
- Dayvon Ross
