= Mike Isom =

American football player and coach

Biographical details
- Born: c. 1948

Playing career
- 1966–1969: Central Arkansas

Coaching career (HC unless noted)
- c. 1975: Hall HS (AR)
- 1977–1981: Little Rock Central HS (AR) (AHC)
- 1982–1989: Central Arkansas (DC)
- 1990–1999: Central Arkansas

Head coaching record
- Overall: 68–38–4
- Tournaments: 5–2 (NAIA D-I playoffs)

Accomplishments and honors

Championships
- 1 NAIA Division I (1991); 3 AIC (1990–1992)

Awards
- NAIA Division I Coach of the Year (1990)

Mike Isom (born c. 1948) is an American former football coach. He served as the head football coach at the University of Central Arkansas (UCA), located in Conway, Arkansas, from 1990 to 1999, compiling a record of 68–38–4 in ten seasons. Isom's teams won three consecutive Arkansas Intercollegiate Conference (AIC) titles from 1990 to 1992 and an NAIA Division I Football National Championship in 1991, the program's third national title in National Association of Intercollegiate Athletics (NAIA) competition. In 1993, Central Arkansas moved from the AIC of the NAIA to the Gulf South Conference at the NCAA Division II level.

A native of Conway, Isom played football at Conway High School, and then at Central Arkansas.

Isom retired from coaching after the 1999 season. He was replaced as head football coach by Clint Conque.

== Head coaching record ==
=== College ===
Year	Team	Overall	Conference	Standing	Bowl/playoffs
Central Arkansas Bears (Arkansas Intercollegiate Conference) (1990–1992)
1990	Central Arkansas	8–4	6–0	1st	L NAIA Division I Semifinal
1991	Central Arkansas	9–2–2	5–0–1	1st	W NAIA Division I Championship
1992	Central Arkansas	9–2–1	6–0	1st	L NAIA Division I Semifinal
Central Arkansas Bears (Gulf South Conference) (1993–1999)
1993	Central Arkansas	6–4–1	4–3	T–3rd	
1994	Central Arkansas	8–2	6–1	T–2nd	
1995	Central Arkansas	7–4	6–3	T–3rd	
1996	Central Arkansas	6–5	5–3	4th	
1997	Central Arkansas	6–4	5–3	T–4th	
1998	Central Arkansas	5–5	4–5	T–5th	
1999	Central Arkansas	4–6	3–6	T–6th	
Central Arkansas:		68–38–4	50–24–1		
Total:		68–38–4			
National championship Conference title Conference division title or championship game berth
