= Brandon Hayes =

American football player (born 1973)

No. 67
- Position: Offensive guard

Personal information
- Born: March 11, 1973 (age 53); Muncie, Indiana, U.S.
- Listed height: 6 ft 4 in (1.93 m)
- Listed weight: 308 lb (140 kg)

Career information
- High school: Muncie Southside
- College: Central State
- NFL draft: 1995: undrafted

Career history
- Carolina Panthers (1995–1996); Indianapolis Colts (1998)*
- * Offseason or practice squad member only

Awards and highlights
- NAIA Division I national champion (1992)
- Stats at Pro Football Reference

William Brandon Hayes (born March 11, 1973) is an American former professional football player who was an offensive guard for the Carolina Panthers of the National Football League (NFL). He played college football for the Central State Marauders.

== Early life ==
William Brandon Hayes was born on March 11, 1973, in Muncie, Indiana. He attended Muncie Southside High School.

== College career ==
Hayes played college football for the Marauders of Central State University. He helped the 1992 Marauders win the NAIA Division I Championship. He was inducted into the school's athletics hall of fame in 2005.

== Professional career ==
After going undrafted in the 1995 NFL draft, Hayes signed with the Carolina Panthers on April 25. He missed the entire 1995 season due to injury. He played in seven games in 1996 as a reserve offensive guard. Hayes was released on August 24, 1997, after the final game of the 1997 preseason.

Hayes signed with the Indianapolis Colts on February 19, 1998, but was later released.

== Personal life ==
Hayes later became an officer with Montgomery County Adult Probation. He earned a master's degree from Central State in 2017.
