= 1992 Central State Marauders football team =

American college football season

1992 Central State Marauders football

NAIA Division I national champion Black college national champion

NAIA Division I Championship, W 19–16 vs. Gardner–Webb
- Conference: Independent
- Record: 12–1
- Head coach: Billy Joe (12th season)
- Home stadium: McPherson Stadium

1992 NAIA Division I independents football records
	Conf.			Overall
Team	W	L	T	W		L		T
No. 1 Central State (OH) ^		–		12	–	1	–	0
No. 20 St. Francis (IL)		–		4	–	5	–	0
No. 19 Western New Mexico		–		4	–	5	–	0
^ – NAIA Division I playoff participant; Rankings from NAIA Division I poll

The 1992 Central State Marauders football team represented Central State University as an independent during the 1992 NAIA Division I football season. Led by twelfth-year head coach Billy Joe, the Marauders compiled an overall record of 12–1 and finished as NAIA Division I national champions. At the conclusion of the season, the Marauders were also recognized as black college national champion.

== Schedule ==
Date	Opponent	Site	Result	Attendance	Source
September 5	Fort Valley State	McPherson Stadium; Wilberforce, OH	W 33–0	3,700	
September 12	at St. Francis (IL)	Memorial Stadium; Joliet, IL	W 7–3		
September 19	vs. Elizabeth City State	Cardinal Stadium; Louisville, KY (River City Classic)	W 24–10	15,100	
September 26	vs. Texas Southern	Cooper Stadium; Columbus, OH (Capital City Classic)	L 17–30	9,500	
October 3	vs. Alabama State	Hoosier Dome; Indianapolis, IN (Circle City Classic)	W 34–13	62,109	
October 10	Kentucky State	McPherson Stadium; Wilberforce, OH	W 83–0	8,500	
October 17	at Morgan State	Hughes Stadium; Baltimore, MD	W 51–29	8,023	
October 24	West Virginia State	McPherson Stadium; Wilberforce, OH	W 42–12		
November 7	Virginia Union	McPherson Stadium; Wilberforce, OH	W 55–12	2,200	
November 14	Knoxville	McPherson Stadium; Wilberforce, OH	W 49–6		
November 21	at Harding	Alumni Field; Searcy, AR (NAIA Division I Quarterfinal)	W 34–0	2,500	
December 5	Central Arkansas	McPherson Stadium; Wilberforce, OH (NAIA Division I Semifinal)	W 30–23	1,500	
December 12	at Gardner–Webb	Ernest W. Spangler Stadium; Boiling Springs, NC (NAIA Division I Championship)	W 19–16	4,855	
