= 1991 Central Arkansas Bears football team =

American college football season

1991 Central Arkansas Bears football

NAIA Division I national champion AIC champion

Champion Bowl, W 19–16 at Central State (OH)
- Conference: Arkansas Intercollegiate Conference
- Record: 9–2–2 (5–0–1 AIC)
- Head coach: Mike Isom (2nd season)
- Home stadium: Estes Stadium

1991 Arkansas Intercollegiate Conference football standings
	Conf.					Overall
Team	W		L		T	W		L		T
No. T–7 Central Arkansas $^	5	–	0	–	1	9	–	2	–	2
No. 12 Harding	4	–	1	–	1	7	–	3	–	1
No. 18 Southern Arkansas	4	–	2	–	0	7	–	4	–	0
Ouachita Baptist	3	–	3	–	0	5	–	5	–	0
Henderson State	2	–	4	–	0	2	–	7	–	1
Arkansas–Monticello	1	–	5	–	0	2	–	8	–	0
Arkansas Tech	1	–	5	–	0	1	–	9	–	0
+ – Conference co-champions; ^ – NAIA Division I playoff participant; Rankings from NAIA Division I poll

The 1991 Central Arkansas Bears football team represented the University of Central Arkansas (UCA) as a member of the Arkansas Intercollegiate Conference (AIC) during the 1991 NAIA Division I football season. Led by second-year head coach Mike Isom, the Bears compiled an overall record of 9–2–2 with a mark of 5–0–1 in conference play, and finished as AIC champions. UCA advanced to the NAIA playoffs and defeated Central State (OH) in the Champion Bowl. This was UCA's third NAIA national championship, having also won the national title in 1984 and 1985.

== Schedule ==
Date	Opponent	Site	Result	Attendance	Source
August 31	at Mississippi College*	Robinson-Hale Stadium; Clinton, MS	L 9–34		
September 7	Mississippi Valley State*	Estes Stadium; Conway, AR	L 3–35		
September 14	Delta State*	Estes Stadium; Conway, AR	W 30–15		
September 21	at Southwestern Oklahoma State*	Milam Stadium; Weatherford, OK	T 17–17		
October 5	at Ouachita Baptist	A. U. Williams Field; Arkadelphia, AR	W 21–6		
October 12	Harding	Estes Stadium; Conway, AR	T 6–6	5,541	
October 19	at Arkansas–Monticello	Cotton Boll Stadium; Monticello, AR	W 21–14		
October 26	Henderson State^{†}	Estes Stadium; Conway, AR	W 21–20	8,061	
November 2	at Southern Arkansas	Wilkins Stadium; Magnolia, AR	W 21–20		
November 9	Arkansas Tech	Estes Stadium; Conway, AR	W 26–14		
November 23	at Northeastern State (OK)*	Gable Field; Tahlequah, OK (NAIA Division I Quarterfinal)	W 30–14	5,000	
December 7	Moorhead State*	Estes Stadium; Conway, AR (NAIA Division I Semifinal)	W 38–18		
December 14	at Central State (OH)*	McPherson Stadium; Wilberforce, OH (Champion Bowl)	W 19–16	2,359	
*Non-conference game; ^{†}Homecoming
