= Bobby Hopkins =

American football player and arm-wrestler (1957–2019)

No. 64
- Position: Guard

Personal information
- Born: June 8, 1957; Baltimore, Maryland, U.S.
- Died: July 5, 2019 (aged 62); Fort Pierce, Florida, U.S.
- Listed height: 6 ft 2 in (1.88 m)
- Listed weight: 265 lb (120 kg)

Career information
- High school: Fort Pierce Central (Fort Pierce, Florida)
- College: Gardner–Webb

Career history
- New England Patriots (1982)*; Carolina Storm (1982); Tampa Bay Bandits (1983); Pittsburgh Maulers (1984)*
- * Offseason or practice squad member only

Bobby Leroy Hopkins (June 8, 1957 – July 5, 2019) was an American football offensive guard who played one season for the Tampa Bay Bandits of the United States Football League (USFL). He was also a well-known arm-wrestler, winning 13 world titles.

== Early life and education ==
Hopkins was born on June 8, 1957, in Baltimore, Maryland. He moved to St. Lucie County, Florida, when he was 13. He attended Fort Pierce Central High School. He went to college at Gardner–Webb University and played offensive lineman for their football team, the Runnin' Bulldogs. He was at college from 1977 to 1980.

== Football career ==
In 1981, Hopkins played with an Orlando team in a minor football league. The next year he was signed by the New England Patriots of the National Football League (NFL), but did not make the roster. Afterwards he returned to the minor leagues and played a season with the Carolina Storm, but was injured for most of the season. In 1983, he was signed by the Tampa Bay Bandits of the United States Football League (USFL). He was 6 feet 2 inches tall, and 265 pounds. With the Bandits he made 13 appearances, with 4 starts. His only other statistic was 1 fumble recovery. In 1984, he was with the Pittsburgh Maulers, but did not play.

== Arm-Wrestling career ==
During and after his football career, Hopkins was popular as an arm-wrestler. A 1983 newspaper stated that "Hopkins is easy to spot among the 70 players still on the Bandits roster. He's the one with the bulging upper body muscles that burst from his skin-tight T-shirt." It later stated that he could bench press 500 pounds, squat 1,000 pounds, and arm curl 175 pounds. In 1982, he became the Florida champion arm-wrestler. He later would be named national and world champion. He won 13 world titles and 27 national titles.

== Later life ==
He later was a pastor and politician. He died on July 5, 2019, in Fort Pierce, Florida, from a stroke. He was 62 at the time of his death.
