= Oval Jaynes =

American football coach (1940–2026)

Biographical details
- Born: July 25, 1940; Morganton, North Carolina, U.S.
- Died: May 24, 2026 (aged 85); Morganton, North Carolina, U.S.
- Education: Appalachian State; Teachers College

Playing career
- 1958–1961: Appalachian State

Coaching career (HC unless noted)
- 1965–1968: The Citadel (assistant)
- 1969–1972: Wake Forest (assistant)
- 1973–1974: South Carolina (WR)
- 1975–1977: Gardner–Webb
- 1978–1980: Wyoming (assistant)

Administrative career (AD unless noted)
- 1981–1986: Auburn (associate AD)
- 1986–1991: Colorado State
- 1991–1996: Pittsburgh
- 1996–1998: Idaho
- 1998–2002: Chattanooga
- 2008–2011: Jacksonville State

Head coaching record
- Overall: 14–15

Lee Oval Jaynes Jr. (July 25, 1940 – May 24, 2026) was an American football coach and college athletics administrator.

== Biography ==
Jaynes was the head football coach at Gardner–Webb University from 1975 to 1977, compiling an overall record of 14–15 in three seasons. He was an assistant coach for three seasons at the University of Wyoming and became an associate athletic director at Auburn University in 1981.

He was an athletic director at five universities: he was hired at Colorado State University in 1986, the University of Pittsburgh in 1991, the University of Idaho in 1996, the University of Tennessee at Chattanooga in 1998, and Jacksonville State University in 2008. His salary as athletic director was $118,000 at Pittsburgh in 1991, and $88,000 at Idaho in 1996.

He served as an assistant football coach and head wrestling coach at The Citadel in the 1965–66 season.

Jaynes did not use his middle name "Oval" until high school, when there were multiple players named "Lee" on the freshman football team.

Jaynes died on May 24, 2026, at the age of 85.

== Head coaching record ==
Year	Team	Overall	Conference	Standing	Bowl/playoffs
Gardner–Webb Runnin' Bulldogs (South Atlantic Conference) (1975–1977)
1975	Gardner–Webb	2–6	1–5	8th	
1976	Gardner–Webb	5–5	3–4	T–5th	
1977	Gardner–Webb	7–4	5–2	T–2nd	
Gardner–Webb:		14–15	9–11		
Total:		14–15			
