= Hillsdale Chargers football =

- First season: 1891; 135 years ago
- Head coach: Nate Shreffler; 2nd season, 12–11 (.522)
- Location: Hillsdale, Michigan
- Stadium: Frank "Muddy" Waters Stadium (capacity: 8,500)
- NCAA division: Division II
- Conference: G-MAC
- Colors: Blue and white

NAIA national championships
- NAIA Division I: 1985
- Website: Charger football

The Hillsdale Chargers football team represents Hillsdale College, located in Hillsdale, Michigan, in NCAA Division II college football. Under previous nicknames, the team was also known as the Hillsdale Dales.

The Chargers, who began playing football in 1891, compete as members of the Great Midwest Athletic Conference.

Hillsdale have won one national championship, in 1985.

== History ==
=== Conferences ===
- 1891–1960: Michigan Intercollegiate Athletic Association
- 1961–1974: NAIA independent
- 1975–1989, 2000–2016: Great Lakes Intercollegiate Athletic Conference
- 1990–1999: Midwest Intercollegiate Football Conference
- 2017–present: Great Midwest Athletic Conference

== Championships ==
=== National championships ===
Year	Association	Division	Head coach	Record	Opponent	Result
1985	NAIA (1)	Division I (1)	Dick Lowry	11–1–1 (5–1 GLIAC)	Central Arkansas	T, 10–10

== Postseason appearances ==
=== NAIA playoffs ===
The Chargers have made eight appearances in the NAIA playoffs, with a combined record of 6–7–1 and one national championship.

Year	Round	Opponent	Result
1957	National Championship	Pittsburg State	L, 26–27
1959	Semifinals	Texas A&I	L, 0–20
1969	Semifinals	Concordia–Moorhead	L, 0–27
1981	Quarterfinals; Semifinals	Fairmont State; Elon	W, 14–12; L, 13–41
1982	Quarterfinals; Semifinals	Carson–Newman; Mesa	W, 20–12; L, 9–18
1985	Quarterfinals; Semifinals; National Championship	Salem (WV); Mesa; Central Arkansas	W, 18–15; W, 24–21 ^{OT} T, 10–10
1986	Quarterfinals; Semifinals	Mesa; Carson–Newman	W, 27–17; L, 16–19 ^{OT}
1988	First Round; Quarterfinals	Fairmont State; Central State (OH)	W, 24–7; L, 7–14
