= RNL Architecture =

Architectural design firm in US

RNL Design was a Denver-based multidisciplinary design firm offering services in architecture, interior design, planning and urban design, landscape architecture, lighting design, and facilities master planning. They are now closed after their portfolio was acquired by Stantec in 2017.

== History ==
Founded in 1956, a one-man operation in Denver known as John B. Rogers, Architect. Rogers, the "R" in RNL Design, studied architectural engineering at Kansas State University. His studies were interrupted by three years of service in the U.S. Army during World War II, after which he returned to graduate. Rogers came to Denver in 1947 to work for the architectural firm Smith, Hegner and Moore. After working in Denver, he attended the University of Texas, earning a bachelor of architecture degree in 1951, and an MBA from the University of Colorado in 1984.

Rogers joined forces with Jerome Nagel in 1961 to form Rogers Nagel Architects.

In 1966, Rogers Nagel Architects joined with Victor Langhart to form Rogers Nagel Langhart Architects and Engineers.

In 2000, acquired Klages Carter Vail and Partners, an architectural firm located in Orange County, California.

== Notable Projects ==
- The National Renewable Energy Laboratory's Research Support Facilities on the U.S. Department of Energy's campus in Golden, CO with Smith group
- Shams Abu Dhabi Master Plan
- 1800 Larimer
- Glendale Community College North Expansion
- The Spire
- 1755 Blake Street
- Colorado Supreme Court Complex
- Colorado History Museum
- Rocky Mountain News Building
- The Cable Center at the University of Denver
- Burj Khalifa Master Plan
- Vail Tower
- Commerce City Civic Center
- Wellington E. Webb Municipal Office Building
