= Dave Dye =

American football coach (born 1945)

Biographical details
- Born: January 8, 1945 (age 81)

Playing career
- 1964–1966: Baldwin–Wallace
- Positions: Halfback, defensive back

Coaching career (HC unless noted)
- 1967: Cloverleaf HS (OH) (assistant)
- 1973–1977: Chamberlain HS (OH)
- 1978–1979: Wayne State (MI) (OL)
- 1980–1996: Hillsdale (DC)
- 1997–2001: Hillsdale

Head coaching record
- Overall: 21–34 (college)

Dave Dye (born January 8, 1945) is an American former college football coach. He served as the head football coach at Hillsdale College in Hillsdale, Michigan for five seasons, from 1997 to 2001, compiling a record of 21–34.

Dye attended Medina High School in Medina, Ohio, where he played football as a quarterback and halfback. He then played college football Baldwin–Wallace College—now known as Baldwin Wallace University in Berea, Ohio under head coach Lee Tressel. Dye began his coaching career in 1967 as an assistant football coach at Cloverleaf High School in Westfield Township, Medina County, Ohio.

== Head coaching record ==
=== College ===
Year	Team	Overall	Conference	Standing	Bowl/playoffs
Hillsdale Chargers (Midwest Intercollegiate Football Conference) (1997–1998)
1997	Hillsdale	4–7	4–6	6th	
1998	Hillsdale	3–8	3–7	11th	
Hillsdale Chargers (Great Lakes Intercollegiate Athletic Conference) (1999–2001)
1999	Hillsdale	8–3	6–3	T–4th	
2000	Hillsdale	3–8	2–8	T–10th	
2001	Hillsdale	3–8	3–7	T–10th	
Hillsdale:		21–34	18–31		
Total:		21–34			
