= Wellspring Church =

Anglican church in Englewood, Colorado, US

- formerly Englewood Methodist Church
- A crane hoists a concrete panel into place at Englewood Methodist Church in 1964.
- Wellspring Church
- 39°38′46″N 104°59′19″W
- Address: 3885 South Broadway, Englewood, Colorado
- Country: United States
- Denomination: Anglican Church in North America
- Website: wellspringenglewood.com

History
- Founded: April 15, 2001
- Founder: Billy Waters

Architecture
- Architect: Thomas E. Moore
- Style: Modern
- Groundbreaking: 1964
- Completed: 1965
- Construction cost: $260,000 ($2.7 million in 2025)

Specifications
- Capacity: 440
- Length: 154 ft (47 m)
- Width: 50 ft (15 m)
- Height: 40 ft (12 m)
- Materials: Prestressed concrete

Administration
- Diocese: Rocky Mountains

Clergy
- Rector: Billy Waters

Wellspring Church is an Anglican church in Englewood, Colorado, United States. It was formed in 2001 as part of the Anglican Mission in America and later became part of the Anglican Church in North America (ACNA). Wellspring has planted several other churches in the Rocky Mountain region. In 2020, it purchased the former building of the Englewood Methodist Church, a 1965 modernist building designed by Thomas E. Moore and constructed of several large prestressed concrete half-arched panels separated by stained-glass windows. Wellspring expanded the building in a 2025–26 construction project. In 2024, Wellspring was the 10th-largest church in the ACNA.

== Building history ==
Wellspring's building at 3885 South Broadway was built as the Englewood Methodist Church. It was designed by Denver architect Thomas E. Moore and engineered by the firm of Ketchum, Konkel, Ryan and Fleming. The cornerstone was laid in June 1964, and the building was completed the following year. The $260,000 ($2.7 million in 2025) building was unusual for its time because its main structural elements were 22 precast, prestressed concrete panels; it took four days to lift them all into place using cranes. The stained-glass windows and light fixtures in the 440-seat nave were handmade by church members, saving $65,000 compared to commercial production. Wellspring expanded the building in 2025 and 2026.

== Congregational history ==
Wellspring Church's former building at 4300 South Lincoln in Englewood became the facility of Spirit of Hope United Methodist Church.

Wellspring Church was established by Billy and Janna Waters in 2000 and held its first official service on Easter Sunday 2001. The church held its first gatherings at Christ Episcopal Church in Denver, and then began meeting in Mayflower Congregational Church in Englewood. Wellspring was part of the Anglican Mission in America. It later acquired the former Cherrilyn Baptist Church at 4300 South Lincoln in Englewood.

Wellspring began ministry apprentices and interns in 2015 and formalized this training through the 3 Streams Institute in 2022. Wellspring has also planted several other churches in the Rocky Mountain region, including in Denver, Littleton, Buena Vista and Lakewood (all in Colorado) and Santa Fe, New Mexico. Waters was made a suffragan bishop of the Anglican Diocese of the Rocky Mountains in 2026.

In 2020, Wellspring Church purchased the Englewood Methodist facility, by then known as Spirit of Hope United Methodist Church, and as part of the transaction the two congregations swapped buildings. By 2024, Wellspring had an average Sunday attendance of 780 and was ranked as the 10th-largest church in the Anglican Church in North America.

== Architecture ==
Wellspring's nave consists of a tent-shaped structure composed of 22 half-arches of prestressed concrete. The 14-foot (4.3 m)-wide panels were poured offsite and moved into position using cranes. The nave is 154 feet (47 m) long, 50 feet (15 m) wide and 40 feet (12 m) high with a interior ceiling height of 35 feet (11 m). The nave features 24 stained glass windows designed by Moore and handmade by the church's members at a cost of $10,000 ($103,809 in 2025).

The use of the prestressed concrete panels created an accordion-like visual effect. The nave has been described as "visually dramatic and theatrical".

The nave is next to a pre-existing education wing. In 2025, Wellspring Church broke ground on an expansion project to build a new entrance facility, fellowship space, coffee bar and restrooms. The project is scheduled for completion in November 2026.
