= Terry Guess =

American football player (born 1974)

Profile
- Position: Wide receiver

Personal information
- Born: September 22, 1974 (age 52); Orangeburg, South Carolina, U.S.
- Listed height: 6 ft 0 in (1.83 m)
- Listed weight: 200 lb (91 kg)

Career information
- High school: Edisto (Cordova, South Carolina)
- College: Gardner–Webb
- NFL draft: 1996: 5th round, 165th overall pick

Career history
- New Orleans Saints (1996)

Career NFL statistics
- Receptions: 2
- Receiving yards: 69
- Receiving touchdowns: 1
- Stats at Pro Football Reference

Terry Guess (born September 22, 1974) is an American former professional football player who was a wide receiver in the National Football League (NFL). He played college football for the Gardner–Webb Runnin' Bulldogs. He was selected by the New Orleans Saints in the fifth round of the 1996 NFL draft.

== Early life ==
Guess attended Edisto High School in Cordova, South Carolina.

== College career ==
While at Gardner–Webb University, Guess earned All-America honors in 1994 after returning an NCAA Division II record six kicks – three punts and three kickoffs – for touchdowns. He was also named first-team All-South Atlantic Conference and All-Region as a return specialist in 1994. Guess averaged 13.5 yards per reception in his two seasons with the Runnin’ Bulldogs and still holds the school record with a pair of 100-yard kickoff returns – vs. SAC rivals Carson-Newman and Mars Hill. In 2015, he was inducted into the Gardner–Webb Athletics Hall of Fame.

== Professional career ==
Guess played one season for the New Orleans Saints in 1996, where he recorded 2 receptions for 69 yards and a touchdown.
