= Denver Civic Center Classroom Building =

Historic education and office building in Denver, Colorado, US

- U.S. National Register of Historic Places
- Colorado State Register of Historic Properties
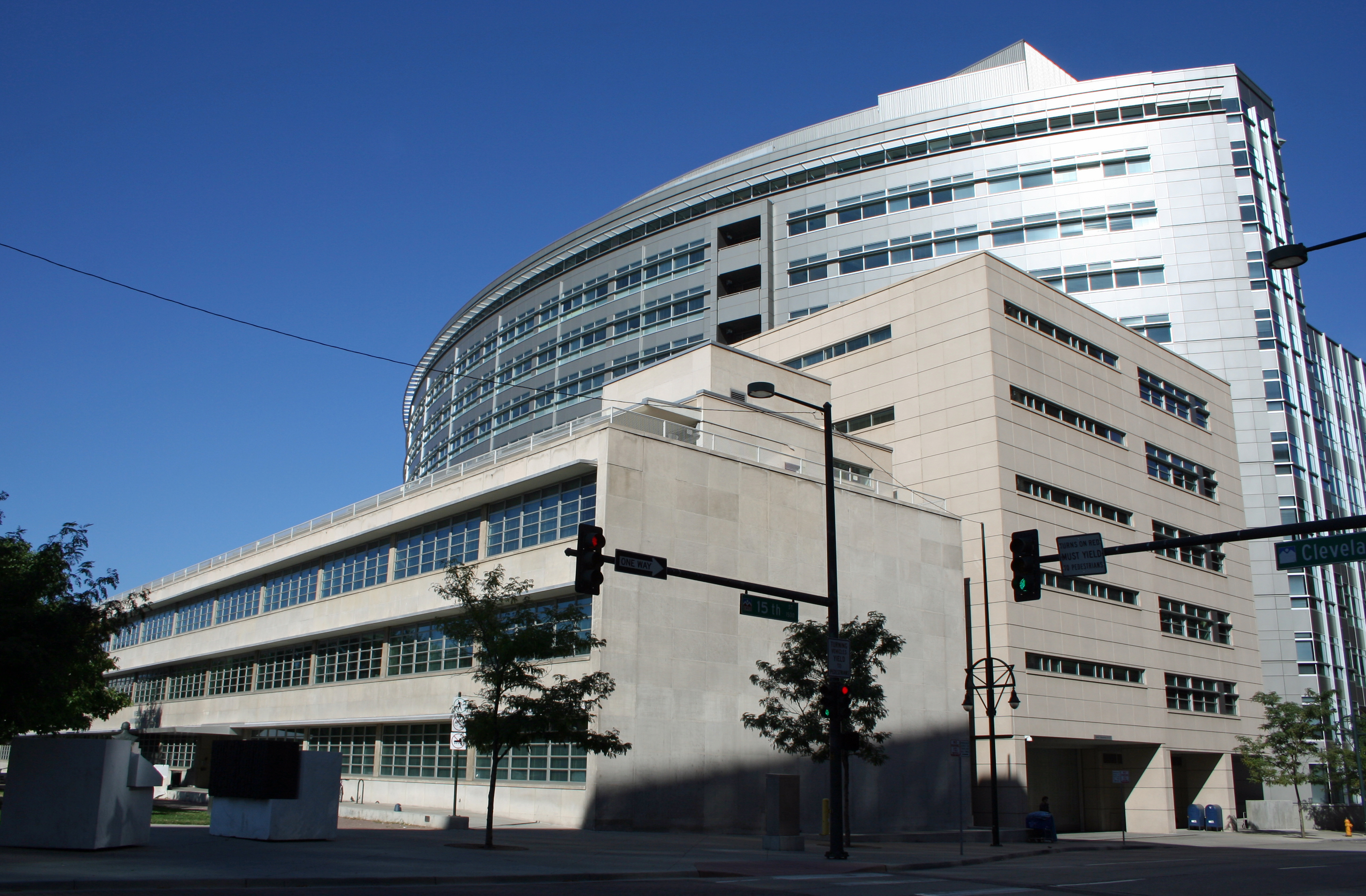
- The Civic Center Classroom Building in the foreground
- Location: Denver, Colorado
- Coordinates: 39.7406°N 104.9897°W
- Built: 1949
- Architect: Smith, Hegner and Moore
- Architectural style: International Style
- NRHP reference No.: 90001346
- CSRHP No.: 5DV.1855
- Added to NRHP: December 6, 1990

The Denver Civic Center Classroom Building is a historic office building and former education building in downtown Denver, Colorado. It was completed in 1949 and is Denver's earliest example of an educational building in the International Style. The Civic Center Classroom Building has been listed on the National Register of Historic Places and the Colorado State Register of Historic Properties since 1990.

The building was the first large-scale commission awarded to the partnership of Casper Hegner, Dudley Smith and Thomas E. Moore. The building was designed for the University of Denver. The building has been described as "one of Denver's best International Style buildings". It features solid walls on each end of dressed Indiana limestone, while the south facade features bands of limestone and windows with sun shields.

The classroom building was later converted into the Wellington E. Webb Municipal Office Building and used as an annex for the nearby Denver City and County Building. It was expanded in 2001–02 with a multistory addition on the northwest side designed by David Owen Tryba Architects and RNL Architecture.
