= Todd Knight (Newberry coach) =

American football coach (born 1966 or 1967)

Current position
- Title: Head coach
- Team: Newberry
- Conference: SAC
- Record: 108–78

Biographical details
- Born: c. 1966 or 1967 (age 58–59)
- Education: Gardner–Webb University (1989, 1990)

Playing career
- 1985–1988: Gardner–Webb

Coaching career (HC unless noted)
- 1989: Gardner–Webb (GA)
- 1990: Lees–McRae (LB)
- 1991–1992: Lees–McRae (DC)
- 1993–1996: Gardner–Webb (DB)
- 1997: Charleston Southern (ILB)
- 1998–2002: Charleston Southern (DC)
- 2003–2008: Newberry (DC)
- 2009–present: Newberry

Head coaching record
- Overall: 108–78
- Tournaments: 4–5 (NCAA D-II playoffs)

Accomplishments and honors

Championships
- 3 SAC (2016, 2021–2022, 2025)

Awards
- 3× SAC Coach of the Year (2016, 2021–2022)

Todd Knight (born c. 1966 or 1967) is an American college football coach. He is the head football coach for Newberry College, a position he has held since 2009. He also coached for Gardner–Webb, Lees–McRae, and Charleston Southern. He played college football for Gardner–Webb.

== Head coaching record ==
Year	Team	Overall	Conference	Standing	Bowl/playoffs	AFCA^{#}
Newberry / Newberry Wolves (South Atlantic Conference) (2009–present)
2009	Newberry	6–4	4–3	T–6th		
2010	Newberry	4–6	3–4	T–5th		
2011	Newberry	4–6	4–3	T–3rd		
2012	Newberry	5–6	3–4	5th		
2013	Newberry	9–3	5–2	T–2nd	L NCAA Division II First Round	23
2014	Newberry	5–6	3–4	T–4th		
2015	Newberry	7–5	4–3	4th	L NCAA Division II First Round	
2016	Newberry	10–2	7–0	1st	L NCAA Division II First Round	16
2017	Newberry	5–6	3–4	T–4th		
2018	Newberry	5–6	3–4	T–5th		
2019	Newberry	5–6	4–4	T–4th		
2020–21	Newberry	5–1	3–1	2nd (Piedmont)		
2021	Newberry	10–3	7–1	1st	L NCAA Division II Second Round	17
2022	Newberry	9–2	7–2	T–1st (Piedmont)		21
2023	Newberry	4–7	3–5	T–4th (Piedmont)		
2024	Newberry	3–7	3–4	4th (Piedmont)		
2025	Newberry	12–2	8–1	1st	L NCAA Division II Semifinal	4
2026	Newberry	0–0	0–0			
Newberry:		108–78	74–49			
Total:		108–78				
National championship Conference title Conference division title or championship game berth
