= 1985 Central Arkansas Bears football team =

American college football season

1985 Central Arkansas Bears football

NAIA Division I national co-champion AIC co-champion

Champion Bowl, T 10–10 vs. Hillsdale
- Conference: Arkansas Intercollegiate Conference
- Record: 10–2–1 (6–1 AIC)
- Head coach: Harold Horton (4th season)
- Home stadium: Estes Stadium

1985 Arkansas Intercollegiate Conference football standings
	Conf.					Overall
Team	W		L		T	W		L		T
No. 6 Central Arkansas +^	6	–	1	–	0	10	–	2	–	1
No. 7 Henderson State +^	6	–	1	–	0	9	–	3	–	0
No. 10 Arkansas–Monticello	5	–	2	–	0	7	–	2	–	0
No. 17 Ouachita Baptist	5	–	2	–	0	7	–	3	–	0
Southern Arkansas	3	–	4	–	0	5	–	5	–	0
Harding	2	–	5	–	0	5	–	5	–	0
Arkansas Tech	1	–	6	–	0	1	–	9	–	0
Arkansas–Pine Bluff	0	–	7	–	0	2	–	8	–	0
+ – Conference co-champions; ^ – NAIA Division I playoff participant; Rankings from NAIA Division I poll

The 1985 Central Arkansas Bears football team represented University of Central Arkansas as a member of the Arkansas Intercollegiate Conference (AIC) during the 1985 NAIA Division I football season. Led by fourth-year head coach Harold Horton, the Bears compiled an overall record of 10–2–1 with a mark of 6–1 in conference play, and finished as AIC co-champion. Central Arkansas advanced to the NAIA playoffs and tied Hillsdale in the Champion Bowl.

== Schedule ==
Date	Opponent	Site	Result	Attendance	Source
September 14	Southeast Missouri State*	Estes Stadium; Conway, AR	W 37–9	5,500	
September 21	Northeastern State (OK)*	Estes Stadium; Conway, AR	W 14–0	5,700	
September 28	at Northwest Missouri State*	Rickenbrode Stadium; Maryville, MO	L 17–31		
October 12	at Arkansas–Monticello	Cotton Boll Stadium; Monticello, AR	W 24–20		
October 19	Southern Arkansas	Estes Stadium; Conway, AR	W 31–14		
October 26	Ouachita Baptist	Estes Stadium; Conway, AR	W 24–7		
November 2	at Arkansas Tech	Buerkle Field; Russellville, AR	W 41–14		
November 9	Arkansas–Pine Bluff	Estes Stadium; Conway, AR	W 35–0		
November 16	at Henderson State	Haygood Stadium; Arkadelphia, AR	L 19–27		
November 23	Harding	Estes Stadium; Conway, AR	W 34–0		
December 7	at Pittsburg State*	Brandenburg Stadium; Pittsburg, KS (NAIA Division I Quarterfinal)	W 32–22		
December 14	Henderson State*	Estes Stadium; Conway, AR (NAIA Division I Semifinal)	W 21–9	3,192	
December 21	Hillsdale*	Estes Stadium; Conway, AR (Champion Bowl)	T 10–10	4,174	
*Non-conference game
