= Thomas Moore (architect) =

American architect (1908–1970)

Moore, in c. 1960

Thomas Edgar Moore (May 11, 1908 – April 28, 1970) was an American architect. He practiced in Colorado, primarily in the Denver area, and he worked primarily in the modernist style. Moore was known for designing precast concrete structures. One of his most notable projects through his firm was the Denver Civic Center Classroom Building (1949) in International Style; he was also known for residential projects and several projects in Grand Junction, Colorado, where he established an office of Smith, Hegner and Moore. Later in life, Moore returned to the Denver area, where he taught architecture and experimented with shell structures and other roof types.

== Early life, education and military service ==
Moore was born in Denver in 1908 and graduated from East Denver High School. He received a B.A. and a B.F.A. in architecture from Yale University, where he befriended fellow student Eero Saarinen. Moore married Ruth Glassco of Winnipeg, Manitoba, in 1936. They had five sons and two daughters.

In the late 1930s, Moore returned to Denver. Among the buildings produced during this period were two modernist residences in Denver: one at 3100 East Exposition (featured in Architectural Forum in 1941) and his own family residence at 1 South Albion Street. Moore paused his practice to serve in the Army Air Corps during World War II.

== Smith, Hegner and Moore ==
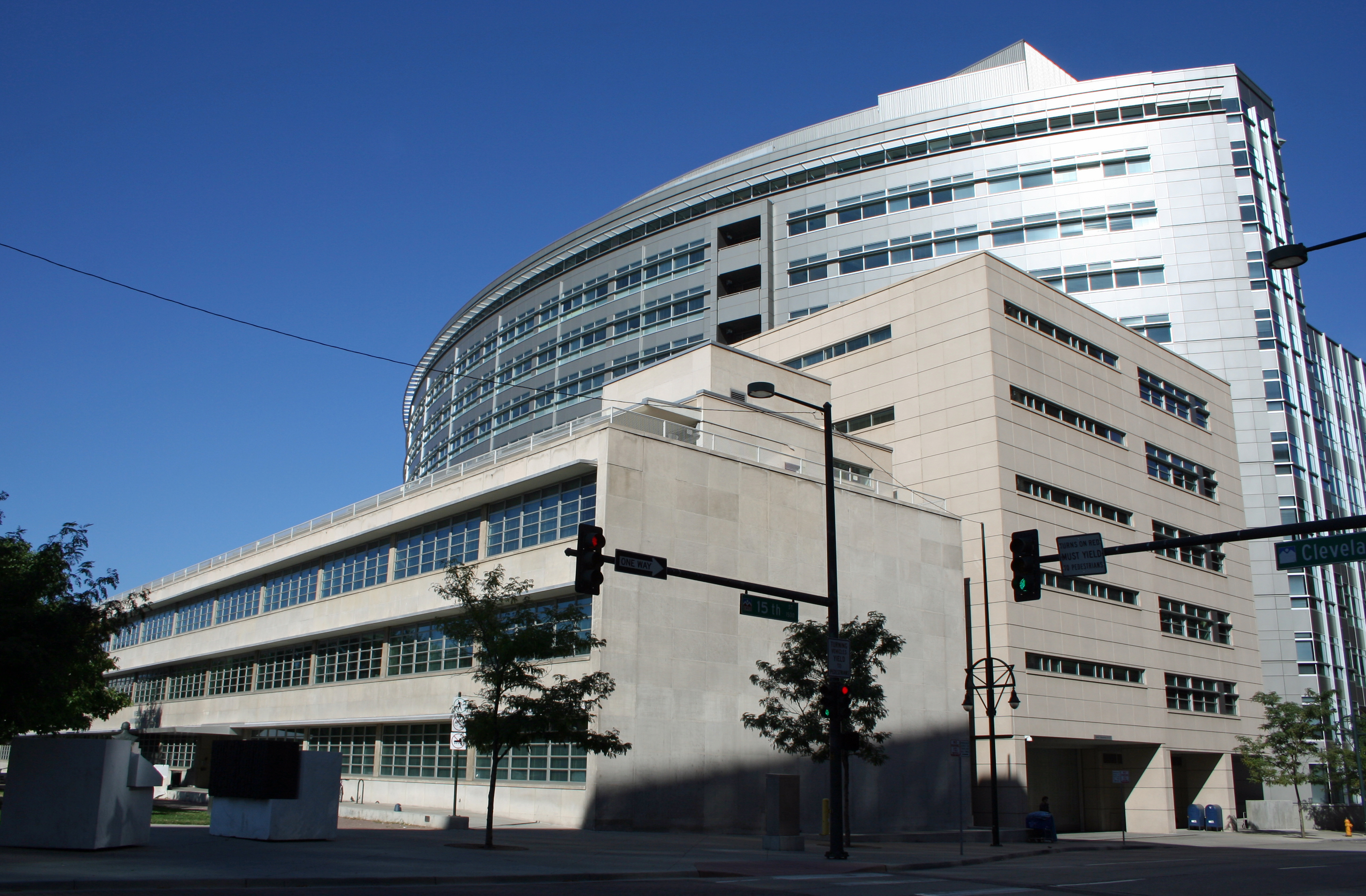
Smith, Hegner and Moore's Civic Center Classroom Building (foreground)

After the conclusion of the war, Moore formed an architecture firm in Denver with his friends Casper Hegner and Dudley Smith. Their first large-scale commission, awarded in 1947 and completed with G. Meredith Musick, was for the University of Denver's Civic Center Classroom Building. It was later converted into the Wellington E. Webb Municipal Building and used as an annex for the nearby Denver City and County Building. The building, completed in 1949, was expanded in the 2000s with a multistory addition. The building has been described as "one of Denver's best International Style buildings" and is Denver's earliest example of an educational building in the International Style. It features solid walls on each end of dressed Indiana limestone, while the south facade features bands of limestone and windows with sun shields. The Civic Center Classroom Building was listed on the National Register of Historic Places in 1990. Smith, Hegner and Moore served as local associate architects for Saarinen's Music Tent at the Goethe Bicentennial Convocation Music Festival in Aspen (1949).

The cantilevered grandstand at Suplizio Field in Grand Junction

In 1947, Moore moved to Grand Junction, Colorado, to open a local office for Smith, Hegner and Moore. Under his management in Grand Junction, the firm designed a number of projects, including an airport terminal for Walker Field, a building for The Daily Sentinel, a remodeled city hall and a new stadium complex. The stadium project was a grandstand for Suplizio Field, in which bleachers for the adjacent football stadium were cantilevered above the bleachers for the baseball fans. He left the firm in 1950. In 1952, he returned to Denver to take advantage of business opportunities there.

== Return to Denver ==
After returning to Denver, Moore experimented with shell structures and precast concrete in a variety of projects. He also taught at the University of Colorado Boulder. He designed two churches completed in 1965. Edgewater Methodist Church in Denver featured a 400-seat sanctuary with faceted stained glass windows. In Englewood, he designed a large prestressed concrete sanctuary for Englewood Methodist Church on Broadway, a project described as "visually dramatic and theatrical". Some of his projects featured folded-plate roofs and geodesic domes. Along with Buckminster Fuller, he developed and patented a thin-shell, precast concrete geodesic dome formed from interlocking "dog bone" modules. He was a member of the Colorado Board of Architect Examiners in the 1950s.

Moore died on April 28, 1970, at 61. Memorial services were held at St. John's Cathedral in Denver.
