= Suplizio Field =

Baseball park in Grand Junction, Colorado, US

Sam Suplizio Field
- Location in the United States Location in Colorado
- Interactive map of Sam Suplizio Field
- Address: 12th Street and North Avenue (U.S. Route 6)
- Location: Grand Junction, Colorado
- Coordinates: 39.077°N 108.550°W
- Elevation: 4,610 ft (1,405 m)
- Owner: City of Grand Junction
- Capacity: 10,000
- Surface: Natural grass
- Field size: Left field foul line: 302 feet (92 m); Left field: 365 feet (111 m); Left-center field: 410 feet (125 m); Center field: 400 feet (122 m); Right-center field: 365 feet (111 m); Right field foul line: 330 feet (101 m)

Construction
- Opened: 1949; 77 years ago

Tenants
- Colorado Mesa University (1949–present); Mesa County School District 51 High School Baseball (1958–present); JUCO Baseball World Series (1958–present); Grand Junction Jackalopes (2012–2025); Grand Junction Razorback Suckers (2026-present)

Sam Suplizio Field is a baseball park in the western United States, located in Grand Junction, Colorado. It is named after the Denver Bears right fielder, New York Yankees prospect, and MLB coach. Suplizio Field is currently home to the Grand Junction Razorback Suckers of the independent Pecos League, and until 2026, was the home of the Grand Junction Jackalopes (formerly the Grand Junction Rockies) of the independent Pioneer League.

The stadium is located just northeast of downtown in Lincoln Park, east of the adjacent Ralph Stocker Stadium. Suplizio Field is also the occasional host of the Colorado Mesa Mavericks baseball team and local high school baseball, and has been the home of the Junior College World Series since 1958. The natural grass field is aligned southeast (home plate to second base) at an approximate elevation of 4,610 feet (1,405 m) above sea level. The original grandstand was designed by architect Thomas E. Moore, in which bleachers for the adjacent football field were cantilevered over the baseball seats. The grandstand was replaced in the 2011 renovation.

== Renovations ==
In June 2011, both Suplizio Field and Ralph Stocker Stadium underwent an $8.3 million renovation project to replace the aging original concrete bleacher section along the first base line at Suplizio, along with the original bleacher section and press box on the west side of adjoining Ralph Stocker Stadium, with a new section that includes new seating for both venues as well as a new two story press box and handicapped accessible mezzanine level which was ready for use by May 2012.

== Tenants ==
- Grand Junction Jackalopes
- Colorado Mesa Mavericks baseball
- Grand Junction High School
- Central High School
- Fruita Monument High School
- Palisade High School

== Awards ==
- Colorado Field of the Year in 2009 by Colorado Sports Turf Managers Association
