= Richard Lowry (psychologist) =

American psychologist

- Born: Richard James Lowry; 1940 (age 85–86)
- Education: Brandeis University
- Known for: VassarStats website
- Scientific career
- Fields: Psychology; Statistics
- Workplaces: Vassar College
- Thesis: Male-female Differences in Attitudes Towards Death (1965)

Richard J. Lowry (born 1940) is an American psychologist and Professor of Psychology Emeritus at Vassar College in Poughkeepsie, New York. He is the developer of the computational statistics website VassarStats and its political offshoot Scoping the Polls. He received his Ph.D. from Brandeis University in 1965, and first joined the faculty of Vassar College the same year. He was named the William R. Kenan Chair at Vassar in 1987, and was later named the Jacob P. Giraud Chair of Natural History there. He retired from the faculty at Vassar in 2006.
