= Vince Buck =

American football player (born 1968)

No. 26
- Positions: Cornerback, safety

Personal information
- Born: January 12, 1968 (age 58); Owensboro, Kentucky, U.S.
- Listed height: 6 ft 0 in (1.83 m)
- Listed weight: 198 lb (90 kg)

Career information
- High school: Owensboro
- College: Central State (OH)
- NFL draft: 1990: 2nd round, 44th overall pick

Career history
- New Orleans Saints (1990–1995)

Career NFL statistics
- Interceptions: 10
- Sacks: 4.5
- Touchdowns: 1
- Stats at Pro Football Reference

Vincent Lamont Buck (born January 12, 1968) is an American former professional football player who was a safety for the New Orleans Saints of the National Football League (NFL). He played college football for the Central State Marauders in Wilberforce, Ohio, where Buck was an NAIA All-American and NAIA Player of the Year in his senior year 1989.

== Professional career ==
He attended the NFL Scouting Combine and chose to still participate in positional drills and performed combine drills although he was hampered by the flu.

(1997 NFL Draft cast on ESPN)

"You say you needed a cornerback? We're talking New Orleans Saints, Vince Buck. Considered as the second best cornerback going into the draft, behind J. D. Williams. Had the size, didn't run well at the combine, but he had the flu. Ran 4.83 there, came back, has been running in the mid 4.5s. So a good pick at this point. Good value pick for the Saints. A team desperate for cornerbacks. And Buck would project to that position to make up for the loss of Dave Waymer to the 49ers."

— Mel Kiper Jr. (ESPN analyst)

The New Orleans Saints selected Buck in the second round (44th overall) of the 1990 NFL draft. He was the third cornerback selected and was only the fourth player drafted from Central State (since 1967) and the first since 1979. Central State is a small HBCU NAIA Division I program located in Wilberforce, Ohio and is virtually unknown in reference with the NFL draft.

After his playing career was over, Buck has been active in the New Orleans community. Vince Buck is the former owner and proprietor of a Cottman transmission service center in New Orleans, and resides in Kenner, Louisiana.
