= Dick Lowry (American football) =

American football coach (1935–2024)

Biographical details
- Born: October 16, 1935
- Died: October 29, 2024 (aged 89)

Coaching career (HC unless noted)
- 1963–1970: Berea-Midpark HS (MI)
- 1971–1973: Akron (offensive backfield)
- 1974–1979: Wayne State (MI)
- 1980–1996: Hillsdale

Head coaching record
- Overall: 172–75–3 (college)
- Tournaments: 6–4–1 (NAIA D-I playoffs)

Accomplishments and honors

Championships
- 1 NAIA Division I (1985); 6 GLIAC (1974, 1980, 1982, 1985–1986, 1988); 1 MIFC (1992)

Awards
- NAIA Division I Coach of the Year (1982)

Richard B. Lowry (October 16, 1935 – October 29, 2024) was an American football coach. He served as the head coach at Wayne State University in Detroit, Michigan, from 1974 to 1979 and at Hillsdale College from 1980 to 1996, compiling a career college football record of 172–75–3.

== Coaching career ==
Lowry was the head football coach at Midpark High School from 1963 to 1970. He was the offensive backfield coach for the Akron Zips football team from 1971 to 1973. Lowry served as the head football coach at Wayne State University for six years from 1974 to 1979, compiling a 38–21–1 record.

Lowry was the head football coach at Hillsdale College in Hillsdale, Michigan. He held that position for 17 seasons, from 1980 until 1996. His coaching record at Hillsdale was 134–52–2.

== Personal life and death ==
Lowry attended Baldwin Wallace University and received a bachelor's degree in 1957. He also received a master's degree from Kent State University.

Lowry died on October 29, 2024, at the age of 89.

== Head coaching record ==
=== College ===
Year	Team	Overall	Conference	Standing	Bowl/playoffs
Wayne State Tartars (NCAA Division II independent) (1974)
1974	Wayne State	7–3			
Wayne State Tartars (Great Lakes Intercollegiate Athletic Conference) (1975–1979)
1975	Wayne State	8–3	3–1	1st	
1976	Wayne State	8–2	3–2	T–2nd	
1977	Wayne State	7–3	3–2	2nd	
1978	Wayne State	5–4	4–1	2nd	
1979	Wayne State	3–5–1	3–1–1	2nd	
Wayne State:		38–21–1	16–7–1		
Hillsdale Chargers (Great Lakes Intercollegiate Athletic Conference) (1980–1989)
1980	Hillsdale	7–3	5–1	1st	
1981	Hillsdale	10–2	5–1	2nd	L NAIA Division I Semifinal
1982	Hillsdale	12–1	6–0	1st	L NAIA Division I Semifinal
1983	Hillsdale	8–2	4–2	T–2nd	
1984	Hillsdale	6–4	3–3	4th	
1985	Hillsdale	11–1–1	5–1	1st	T NAIA Division I Championship
1986	Hillsdale	10–2	5–0	1st	L NAIA Division I Semifinal
1987	Hillsdale	6–5	2–3	T–3rd	
1988	Hillsdale	10–2	5–0	1st	L NAIA Division I Quarterfinal
1989	Hillsdale	6–4	3–2	T–2nd	
Hillsdale Chargers (Midwest Intercollegiate Football Conference) (1990–1996)
1990	Hillsdale	7–4	7–3	T–2nd	
1991	Hillsdale	5–6	5–5	T–4th	
1992	Hillsdale	9–2	8–2	T–1st	
1993	Hillsdale	7–3–1	6–3–1	4th	
1994	Hillsdale	7–4	7–3	3rd	
1995	Hillsdale	7–4	7–3	T–3rd	
1996	Hillsdale	6–5	6–4	5th	
Hillsdale:		134–54–2	89–36–1		
Total:		172–75–3			
National championship Conference title Conference division title or championship game berth
