= Brian Johnston (linebacker) =

American football player (born 1986)

No. 97
- Position: Linebacker

Personal information
- Born: May 2, 1986 (age 40); San Diego, California, U.S.
- Listed height: 6 ft 5 in (1.96 m)
- Listed weight: 269 lb (122 kg)

Career information
- High school: Madison (San Diego)
- College: Gardner–Webb
- NFL draft: 2008: 7th round, 210th overall pick

Career history
- Kansas City Chiefs (2008); Detroit Lions (2009)*; Miami Dolphins (2010)*; Omaha Nighthawks (2011); New Orleans VooDoo (2012)
- * Offseason or practice squad member only

Awards and highlights
- First-team Little All-American (2007); Second-team Little All-American (2006); 3× First-team All-Big South (2005–2007); 2× Big South Defensive Player of the Year (2006, 2007)

Career NFL statistics
- Total tackles: 3
- Stats at Pro Football Reference

Brian Thomas Johnston (born May 2, 1986) is an American former professional football player who was a linebacker in the National Football League (NFL). He played college football for the Gardner–Webb Runnin' Bulldogs and was selected by the Kansas City Chiefs in the seventh round of the 2008 NFL draft.

== Early life ==
Johnston was a defensive end at Madison High School in San Diego, California, where he was a two-time First-team All-Harbor League selection (as a junior and senior). He totaled 82 tackles (30 solo), 10 sacks, 13 tackles for loss, four forced fumbles and six passes defensed as a senior.

== College career ==
For his career (2004–2007) Johnston played in 42 games and started 40 at Gardner–Webb University. His career totals were 268 tackles (124 solo), 21 sacks and 55.5 tackles for loss, ten forced fumbles, three fumble recoveries, six passes defensed, and one blocked kick. He also caught a three-yard TD pass on offense, as well. As a senior in 2007 he started all 11 games at left defensive end, and had 74 tackles (34 solo), 24 tackles for loss, 6 sacks, a forced fumble, three passes defensed and a three-yard TD catch on offense. He earned numerous college division First-team All-American selections and was named First-team All-Big South Conference for the third consecutive season and was the Defensive Most Valuable Player for the second straight season as well. He also was a finalist for the Buck Buchanan Award in 2007. In 2006, he started 11 contests at left defensive end, totaling 77 tackles (35 solo), 14 tackles for loss, 8 sacks, two forced fumbles and one fumble recovery and was Second-team All-America honors by The NFL Draft Report, Associated Press and Football Gazette and was named the conference's Defensive Player of the Year and a First-team All-Big South Conference selection. In 2005, he started all 11 games in his first season at right defensive end, totaling 59 tackles (28 solo) with 5 sacks and 12.5 tackles for loss, four forced fumbles, one fumble recovery, one pass defensed and a blocked kick and was also named First-team All-Big Conference for the first time. Johnston played in nine games as a true freshman making seven starts at outside linebacker and making 58 tackles (24 solo), 2.sacks, 5 tackles for loss, three forced fumbles, one fumble recovery, and two passes defensed.

== Professional career ==
Pre-draft measurables
Height	Weight	40-yard dash	10-yard split	20-yard split	20-yard shuttle	Three-cone drill	Vertical jump
6 ft 5 1/8 in (1.96 m)	274 lb (124 kg)	4.66 s	1.51 s	2.66 s	4.18 s	6.96 s	35 in (0.89 m)
All values from Pro Day.

=== Kansas City Chiefs ===
He became the first player the Chiefs took from Gardner–Webb when they selected him with the first of their two seventh-round picks (210th overall) in 2008. In 2008, he played 9 games and made 3 tackles. He was waived by the Chiefs on May 26, 2009.

Johnston was claimed by the Detroit Lions off of waivers on May 28, but failed his physical and was not added to the team's roster.

=== Miami Dolphins ===
After spending the 2009 season out of football, Johnston signed a future contract with the Miami Dolphins on January 6, 2010.

=== UFL ===
Johnston was selected by the Omaha Nighthawks in the eighth round of the 2011 UFL draft.
