= Cordova, South Carolina =

- Town
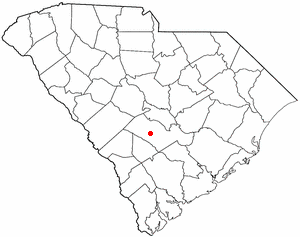
- Location of Cordova, South Carolina
- Coordinates: 33°26′04″N 80°55′16″W
- Country: United States
- State: South Carolina
- County: Orangeburg

Area
  - Total: 0.44 sq mi (1.13 km^{2})
  - Land: 0.44 sq mi (1.13 km^{2})
  - Water: 0 sq mi (0.00 km^{2})
- Elevation: 249 ft (76 m)

Population (2020)
  - Total: 136
  - Density: 312.0/sq mi (120.45/km^{2})
- Time zone: UTC-5 (Eastern (EST))
  - Summer (DST): UTC-4 (EDT)
- ZIP code: 29039
- Area codes: 803, 839
- FIPS code: 45-16855
- GNIS feature ID: 2406312

Cordova is a town in Orangeburg County, South Carolina, United States. As of the 2020 census, Cordova had a population of 136.

Despite its small size, Cordova is home to both a high school and primary school, a fire department, and a single daycare.

At the heart of Cordova is the town hall, which houses community events, fundraisers, and birthday parties throughout the year.

== Traditions ==
Cordova used to hold an annual firework show on the Fourth of July, however that has been discontinued as of 2019.

The Town of Cordova annually hosts the local school's homecoming parade. This consists of several floats and candy being thrown into the crowd.

Around Christmas time, a tree is placed on the Gazebo.

== Geography ==
According to the United States Census Bureau, the town has a total area of 0.4 square miles (1.0 km^{2}), all land.

An active train track runs through the town.

== Demographics ==
Historical population
Census	Pop.	Note	%±
1920	133		—
1930	151		13.5%
1940	139		−7.9%
1950	175		25.9%
1960	209		19.4%
1970	205		−1.9%
1980	202		−1.5%
1990	135		−33.2%
2000	157		16.3%
2010	169		7.6%
2020	136		−19.5%
U.S. Decennial Census

=== 2020 census ===
Cordova town, South Carolina – Racial and ethnic composition Note: the US Census treats Hispanic/Latino as an ethnic category. This table excludes Latinos from the racial categories and assigns them to a separate category. Hispanics/Latinos may be of any race.
Race / Ethnicity (NH = Non-Hispanic)	Pop 2000	Pop 2010	Pop 2020	% 2000	% 2010	% 2020
White alone (NH)	153	140	113	97.45%	82.84%	83.09%
Black or African American alone (NH)	2	21	5	1.27%	12.43%	3.68%
Native American or Alaska Native alone (NH)	0	3	0	0.00%	1.78%	0.00%
Asian alone (NH)	0	0	1	0.00%	0.00%	0.74%
Native Hawaiian or Pacific Islander alone (NH)	0	0	0	0.00%	0.00%	0.00%
Other race alone (NH)	0	0	0	0.00%	0.00%	0.00%
Mixed race or Multiracial (NH)	2	2	7	1.27%	1.18%	5.15%
Hispanic or Latino (any race)	0	3	10	0.00%	1.78%	7.35%
Total	157	169	136	100.00%	100.00%	100.00%

=== 2000 census ===
As of the census of 2000, there were 157 people, 59 households, and 47 families residing in the town. The population density was 347.0 inhabitants per square mile (134.0/km^{2}). There were 64 housing units at an average density of 141.5 per square mile (54.6/km^{2}). The racial makeup of the town was 97.45% White, 1.27% African American, and 1.27% from two or more races.

There were 59 households, out of which 49.2% had children under the age of 18 living with them, 62.7% were married couples living together, 15.3% had a female householder with no husband present, and 20.3% were non-families. 20.3% of all households were made up of individuals, and 11.9% had someone living alone who was 65 years of age or older. The average household size was 2.66 and the average family size was 3.06.

In the town, the population was spread out, with 29.3% under the age of 18, 8.9% from 18 to 24, 29.9% from 25 to 44, 21.0% from 45 to 64, and 10.8% who were 65 years of age or older. The median age was 30 years. For every 100 females, there were 74.4 males. For every 100 females age 18 and over, there were 82.0 males.

The median income for a household in the town was $43,125, and the median income for a family was $46,875. Males had a median income of $36,750 versus $25,000 for females. The per capita income for the town was $18,332. About 15.8% of families and 18.2% of the population were below the poverty line, including 26.2% of those under the age of eighteen and none of those 65 or over.
