= Ralph Stocker Stadium =

Stadium in Colorado

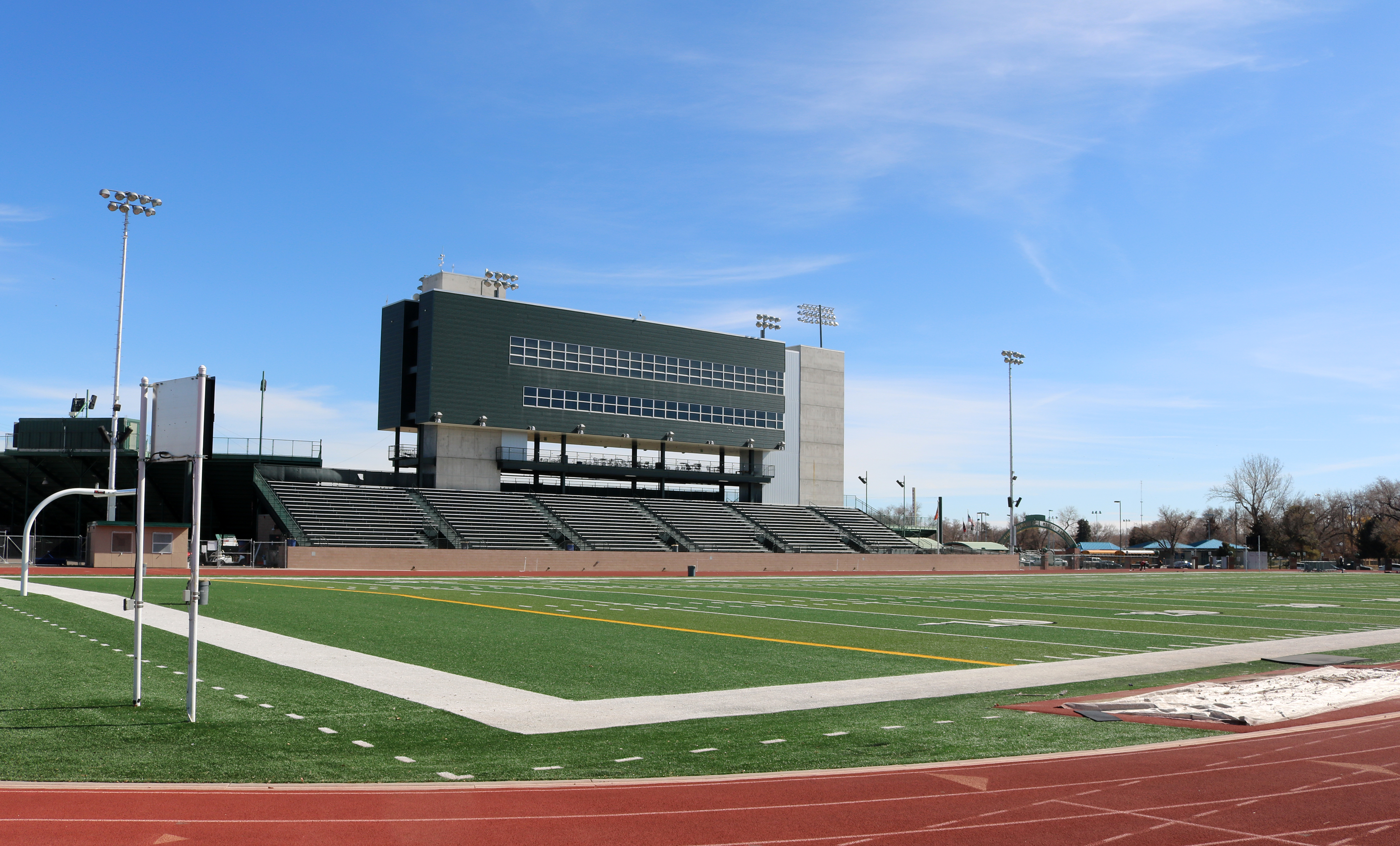
- The stadium in 2020
- Interactive map of Ralph Stocker Stadium
- Coordinates: 39°04′35″N 108°33′06″W
- Owner: City of Grand Junction
- Capacity: 8,000
- Surface: Turf

Construction
- Opened: 1949

Tenant
- Colorado Mesa University (1949–present)

Ralph Stocker Stadium is owned by the city of Grand Junction, Colorado. Its current tenants are Colorado Mesa University Mavericks football and Mesa County Valley School District 51 high school football, though it hosts other local events as well including track and field and both college and high school commencement ceremonies. The stadium is adjacent on its east side to Suplizio Field; the athletic complex collectively is known as the Lincoln Park Sports Complex.

== Renovations ==
In June 2011, both venues underwent an $8.3 million renovation project to replace the aging bleacher sections and press box on the east side of the stadium, along with the adjoining first base bleachers at Suplizio Field, with a new section that includes new seating for both venues as well as a new two-story press box and handicapped-accessible mezzanine level which was ready for use by May 2012.
