= 1991 NAIA Division I football season =

American college football season

- Regular season: August–November 1991
- Postseason: November 23–December 14, 1991
- National Championship: McPherson Stadium; Wilberforce, OH
- Champions: Central Arkansas

The 1991 NAIA Division I football season was the 36th season of college football sponsored by the NAIA, was the 22nd season of play of the NAIA's top division for football.

The season was played from August to November 1991 and culminated in the 1991 NAIA Champion Bowl playoffs and the 1991 NAIA Champion Bowl, played this year on December 14, 1991 at McPherson Stadium in Wilberforce, Ohio, on the campus of Central State University.

The Central Arkansas defeated the Central State Marauders, the defending national champions, in the Champion Bowl, 19–16, to win their third NAIA national title. It was the Bears' first non-shared national title.

== Conference changes ==
- This is the final season that the NAIA officially recognizes a football champion from the South Atlantic Conference. The SAC, and its eight members, would become an NCAA Division II conference by the 1993 season.

== Conference standings ==
1991 Arkansas Intercollegiate Conference football standings
	Conf.					Overall
Team	W		L		T	W		L		T
No. T–7 Central Arkansas $^	5	–	0	–	1	9	–	2	–	2
No. 12 Harding	4	–	1	–	1	7	–	3	–	1
No. 18 Southern Arkansas	4	–	2	–	0	7	–	4	–	0
Ouachita Baptist	3	–	3	–	0	5	–	5	–	0
Henderson State	2	–	4	–	0	2	–	7	–	1
Arkansas–Monticello	1	–	5	–	0	2	–	8	–	0
Arkansas Tech	1	–	5	–	0	1	–	9	–	0
+ – Conference co-champions; ^ – NAIA Division I playoff participant; Rankings from NAIA Division I poll

1991 Northern Intercollegiate Conference football standings
	Conf.					Overall
Team	W		L		T	W		L		T
No. 4 Moorhead State $^	5	–	0	–	0	10	–	2	–	0
No. 9 Southwest State (MN)	5	–	1	–	0	9	–	1	–	0
Minnesota Duluth	4	–	1	–	0	6	–	4	–	0
Northern State	3	–	3	–	0	6	–	5	–	0
Bemidji State	1	–	4	–	0	2	–	7	–	0
Minnesota Morris	1	–	5	–	0	2	–	9	–	0
Winona State	0	–	5	–	0	1	–	9	–	0
$ – Conference champion; ^ – NAIA Division I playoff participant; Rankings from NAIA Division I poll

1991 Oklahoma Intercollegiate Conference football standings
	Conf.					Overall
Team	W		L		T	W		L		T
No. 1 Northeastern State $^	5	–	0	–	0	10	–	1	–	0
No. 14 NW Oklahoma State	4	–	1	–	0	8	–	2	–	0
No. 15 SW Oklahoma State	3	–	2	–	0	6	–	4	–	1
East Central	2	–	3	–	0	5	–	4	–	1
SE Oklahoma State	1	–	4	–	0	4	–	5	–	0
Langston	0	–	5	–	0	2	–	8	–	0
$ – Conference champion; ^ – NAIA Division I playoff participant; Rankings from NAIA Division I poll

1991 Rocky Mountain Athletic Conference football standings
	Conf.					Overall
Team	W		L		T	W		L		T
No. 5 Western State (CO) $^	6	–	0	–	0	10	–	2	–	0
No. 11 Fort Hays State	4	–	2	–	0	8	–	3	–	0
Colorado Mines	3	–	3	–	0	6	–	4	–	0
Chadron State	3	–	3	–	0	5	–	5	–	1
Mesa State	3	–	3	–	0	3	–	7	–	0
No. 16 Adams State	2	–	4	–	0	6	–	4	–	0
Fort Lewis	0	–	6	–	0	2	–	8	–	0
New Mexico Highlands *	0	–	0	–	0	1	–	9	–	0
$ – Conference champion; ^ – NAIA Division I playoff participant * – ineligible for conference title; Rankings from NAIA Division I poll

1991 South Atlantic Conference football standings
	Conf.					Overall
Team	W		L		T	W		L		T
No. 3 Carson–Newman $^	7	–	0	–	0	10	–	1	–	0
No. 13 Catawba	5	–	2	–	0	7	–	3	–	0
No. 20 Lenoir–Rhyne	4	–	3	–	0	6	–	5	–	0
No. 17 Wingate	3	–	4	–	0	6	–	4	–	0
Elon	3	–	4	–	0	6	–	5	–	0
Gardner–Webb	3	–	4	–	0	6	–	5	–	0
Presbyterian	3	–	4	–	0	4	–	7	–	0
Mars Hill	1	–	6	–	0	3	–	7	–	0
$ – Conference champion; ^ – NAIA Division I playoff participant; Rankings from NAIA Division I poll

1991 West Virginia Intercollegiate Athletic Conference football standings
	Conf.					Overall
Team	W		L		T	W		L		T
No. 6 Shepherd $^	7	–	0	–	0	8	–	3	–	0
No. 10 Concord	6	–	1	–	0	8	–	2	–	0
No. 19 West Virginia State	4	–	3	–	0	6	–	4	–	0
West Liberty State	3	–	3	–	1	4	–	5	–	1
Glenville State	3	–	4	–	0	4	–	5	–	1
West Virginia Wesleyan	3	–	4	–	0	4	–	5	–	0
Fairmont State	1	–	5	–	1	1	–	8	–	1
West Virginia Tech	0	–	7	–	0	0	–	10	–	0
$ – Conference champion; ^ – NAIA Division I playoff participant West Virginia Tech forfeited four victories, including two conference wins, over Fairmont State and West Virginia Wesleyan.; Rankings from NAIA Division I poll

1991 NAIA Division I independents football records
	Conf.			Overall
Team	W	L	T	W		L		T
No. 2 Central State (OH) ^		–		11	–	2	–	0
No. T–7 Iowa Wesleyan ^		–		10	–	2	–	0
Western New Mexico		–		4	–	4	–	0
^ – NAIA Division I playoff participant; Rankings from NAIA Division I poll

== Rankings ==
Final NAIA Division I poll rankings:

Rank	Team (first place votes)	Record (thru Nov. 16)	Points
1	Northeastern State (8)	10–0	252
2	Central State (OH) (2)	9–1	246
3	Carson–Newman (3)	7–3	231
4	Moorhead State	8–1	219
5	Western State (CO)	9–1	207
6	Shepherd	8–2	187
T–7	Central Arkansas	6–2–2	175
T–7	Iowa Wesleyan	10–1	175
9	Southwest State (MN)	8–1	155
10	Concord	8–2	139
11	Fort Hays State	8–3	132
12	Harding	7–3–1	106
13	Catawba	7–3	104
14	Northwestern Oklahoma State	8–2	98
15	Southwestern Oklahoma State	6–3–1	68
16	Adams State	6–4	52
17	Wingate	6–4	48
18	Southern Arkansas	6–5	44
19	West Virginia State	6–4	31
20	Lenoir–Rhyne	6–5	28

== Conference champions ==
Conference	Champion	Record
Arkansas	Central Arkansas	5–0–1
NIC	Minnesota–Duluth	4–1
Oklahoma	Northeastern State	5–0
South Atlantic	Carson–Newman	—
WVIAC	Shepherd	7–0

== Postseason ==
Quarterfinals; November 23, 1991; Campus sites
Iowa Wesleyan	14
Moorhead State*	47
Central Arkansas	30
Northeastern State*	14
Carson–Newman	21
Western State (CO)*	38
Shepherd	22
Central State (OH)*	34

Semifinals; December 7, 1991; Campus sites
Moorhead State	18
Central Arkansas*	38
Western State (CO)	13
Central State (OH)*	20

1991 Champion Bowl; December 14, 1991; Wilberforce, OH
Central Arkansas	19
Central State (OH)*	16

== See also ==
- 1991 NCAA Division I-A football season
- 1991 NCAA Division I-AA football season
- 1991 NCAA Division II football season
- 1991 NCAA Division III football season
