= 1990 NAIA Division I football season =

American college football season

- Regular season: August–November 1990
- Postseason: November 17–December 8, 1990
- National Championship: Ralph Stocker Stadium; Grand Junction, CO
- Champions: Central State (OH)

The 1990 NAIA Division I football season was the 35th season of college football sponsored by the NAIA, and was the 21st season of play of the NAIA's top division for football.

The season was played from August to November 1990 and culminated in the 1990 NAIA Champion Bowl playoffs and the 1990 NAIA Champion Bowl, played this year on December 8, 1990 at Ralph Stocker Stadium in Grand Junction, Colorado, on the campus of Mesa State College.

The Central State Marauders defeated the Mesa State Mavericks in the Champion Bowl, 38–16, to win their first NAIA national title. The Marauders won the championship after winning all three games on the road.

== Conference changes ==
- This is the final season that the NAIA officially recognizes a football champion from the Rocky Mountain Athletic Conference. The RMAC, and its five football-playing members, would become an NCAA Division II conference by the 1992 season.

== Conference standings ==
1990 Arkansas Intercollegiate Conference football standings
	Conf.					Overall
Team	W		L		T	W		L		T
No. 4 Central Arkansas $^	6	–	0	–	0	8	–	4	–	0
Henderson State	4	–	2	–	0	6	–	3	–	1
No. 18 Ouachita Baptist	4	–	2	–	0	5	–	4	–	0
No. 10 Southern Arkansas	3	–	3	–	0	8	–	3	–	1
No. 15 Harding	3	–	3	–	0	6	–	4	–	0
Arkansas–Monticello	1	–	5	–	0	5	–	5	–	0
Arkansas Tech	0	–	6	–	0	4	–	6	–	0
+ – Conference co-champions; ^ – NAIA Division I playoff participant; Rankings from NAIA Division I poll

1990 Oklahoma Intercollegiate Conference football standings
	Conf.					Overall
Team	W		L		T	W		L		T
No. 7 Northeastern State $^	4	–	0	–	0	7	–	3	–	1
No. T–12 NW Oklahoma State	3	–	1	–	0	6	–	4	–	0
SE Oklahoma State	2	–	2	–	0	4	–	4	–	1
SW Oklahoma State	1	–	3	–	0	5	–	5	–	0
East Central	0	–	4	–	0	1	–	9	–	0
$ – Conference champion; ^ – NAIA Division I playoff participant; Rankings from NAIA Division I poll

1990 Northern Intercollegiate Conference football standings
	Conf.					Overall
Team	W		L		T	W		L		T
Minnesota Duluth +	5	–	1	–	0	9	–	1	–	1
No. 5 Southwest State (MN) +^	5	–	1	–	0	8	–	3	–	0
No. 9 Northern State +	5	–	1	–	0	7	–	4	–	0
No. 19 Moorhead State	3	–	3	–	0	5	–	5	–	0
Minnesota Morris	2	–	4	–	0	4	–	7	–	0
Winona State	1	–	5	–	0	2	–	9	–	0
Bemidji State	0	–	6	–	0	1	–	10	–	0
+ – Conference co-champions; ^ – NAIA Division I playoff participant; Rankings from NAIA Division I poll

1990 Rocky Mountain Athletic Conference football standings
	Conf.					Overall
Team	W		L		T	W		L		T
No. 6 Mesa State $^	4	–	0	–	0	8	–	4	–	0
Adams State	3	–	1	–	0	5	–	4	–	0
Colorado Mines	1	–	3	–	0	5	–	5	–	0
Western State (CO)	1	–	3	–	0	3	–	7	–	0
Fort Lewis	1	–	3	–	0	2	–	7	–	0
$ – Conference champion; ^ – NAIA Division I playoff participant; Rankings from NAIA Division I poll

1990 South Atlantic Conference football standings
	Conf.					Overall
Team	W		L		T	W		L		T
No. 1 Carson–Newman $^	7	–	0	–	0	11	–	1	–	0
Catawba	5	–	2	–	0	5	–	6	–	0
No. 16 Lenoir–Rhyne	4	–	3	–	0	6	–	5	–	0
No. 17 Wingate	3	–	4	–	0	6	–	4	–	0
Elon	3	–	4	–	0	5	–	6	–	0
Mars Hill	2	–	5	–	0	4	–	7	–	0
Gardner–Webb	2	–	5	–	0	2	–	8	–	0
Presbyterian	2	–	5	–	0	2	–	9	–	0
$ – Conference champion; ^ – NAIA Division I playoff participant; Rankings from NAIA Division I poll

1990 West Virginia Intercollegiate Athletic Conference football standings
	Conf.					Overall
Team	W		L		T	W		L		T
No. T–12 Concord $	5	–	1	–	0	6	–	4	–	0
No. 11 Shepherd	4	–	1	–	1	6	–	3	–	1
No. 20 Fairmont State	4	–	1	–	1	5	–	4	–	1
West Virginia State	3	–	3	–	0	4	–	6	–	0
West Virginia Tech	2	–	4	–	0	3	–	7	–	0
West Liberty State	1	–	5	–	0	4	–	6	–	0
Glenville State	1	–	5	–	0	1	–	7	–	1
$ – Conference champion; Rankings from NAIA Division I poll

1990 NAIA Division I independents football records
	Conf.			Overall
Team	W	L	T	W		L		T
No. 2 Central State (OH) ^		–		10	–	1	–	0
Arkansas–Pine Bluff		–		9	–	1	–	0
No. 3 Western New Mexico ^		–		8	–	2	–	0
No. 8 Fort Hays State ^		–		8	–	4	–	0
No. 14 Emporia State		–		6	–	4	–	0
West Virginia Wesleyan		–		5	–	5	–	0
Langston		–		4	–	5	–	0
^ – NAIA Division I playoff participant; Rankings from NAIA Division I poll

== Conference champions ==
Conference	Champion	Record
Arkansas Intercollegiate	Central Arkansas	6—0
NIC	Northern State (SD); Southwest State (MN)	5–1
Oklahoma	Northeastern State	4–0
RMAC	Mesa State	4–0
South Atlantic	Carson–Newman	7–0
WVIAC	Concord (WV)	5–1

== Rankings ==
Final NAIA Division I poll rankings:

Rank	Team (first place votes)	Record (thru Nov. 11)	Points
1	Carson–Newman (13)	10–0	237
2	Central State (OH) (1)	7–1	266
3	Western New Mexico	8–1	247
4	Central Arkansas	7–3	224
5	Southwest State (MN)	8–2	216
6	Mesa State	6–3	213
7	Northeastern State	7–2–1	209
8	Fort Hays State	8–3	185
9	Northern State	7–3	155
10	Southern Arkansas	7–3–1	141
11	Shepherd	6–3–1	127
T–12	Concord	6–4	117
T–12	Northwestern Oklahoma State	6–4	117
14	Emporia State	6–4	105
15	Harding	6–4	74
16	Lenoir–Rhyne	6–5	59
17	Wingate	6–4	46
18	Ouachita Baptist	5–4	44
19	Moorhead State	5–4	41
20	Fairmont State	5–4–1	35

== Postseason ==
Quarterfinals; November 17, 1990; Campus sites
Central State (OH)	48
Fort Hays State*	10
Southwest State (MN)	6
Carson–Newman*	35
Western New Mexico	30
Mesa State*	37
Northeastern State	14
Central Arkansas*	26

Semifinals; December 1, 1990; Campus sites
Central State (OH)	41
Carson–Newman*	14
Mesa State*	10
Central Arkansas	9

1990 Champion Bowl; December 8, 1990; Grand Junction, CO
Central State (OH)	38
Mesa State*	16

== See also ==
- 1990 NCAA Division I-A football season
- 1990 NCAA Division I-AA football season
- 1990 NCAA Division II football season
- 1990 NCAA Division III football season
