= 1985 NAIA Division I football season =

American college football season

- Regular season: August–November 1985
- Postseason: December 7–21, 1985
- National Championship: Estes Stadium; Conway, AR
- Champions: Central Arkansas (2); Hillsdale

The 1985 NAIA Division I football season was the 30th season of college football sponsored by the NAIA, was the 16th season of play of the NAIA's top division for football.

The season was played from August to November 1985 and culminated in the 1985 NAIA Champion Bowl, played this year on December 21, 1985, at Estes Stadium in Conway, Arkansas, on the campus of the University of Central Arkansas, for the second straight year.

Central Arkansas and Hillsdale played to a tie, 10–10, in the Champion Bowl and both teams were named co-national champions. It was Central Arkansas' second NAIA title (and second straight shared title) and Hillsdale's first.

== Conference realignment ==
=== Conference changes ===
- The Columbia Football League began play this season, with the combined football membership of the former Evergreen (NAIA Division I) and Pacific Northwest (NAIA Division II) conferences. The new league had fourteen members from British Columbia, Oregon, and Washington.

=== Membership changes ===
Team	1984 conference	1985 conference
Central Washington	Evergreen	Columbia
Eastern Oregon	Evergreen	Columbia
Lewis & Clark	Pacific Northwest	Columbia
Linfield	Pacific Northwest	Columbia
Oregon Tech	Evergreen	Columbia
Pacific (OR)	Pacific Northwest	Columbia
Pacific Lutheran	Pacific Northwest	Columbia
Puget Sound	Evergreen	Columbia
Simon Fraser	Evergreen	Columbia
Southern Oregon	Evergreen	Columbia
Western Oregon	Evergreen	Columbia
Western Washington	Evergreen	Columbia
Whitworth	Evergreen	Columbia
Willamette	Pacific Northwest	Columbia

== Conference standings ==
1985 Arkansas Intercollegiate Conference football standings
	Conf.					Overall
Team	W		L		T	W		L		T
No. 6 Central Arkansas +^	6	–	1	–	0	10	–	2	–	1
No. 7 Henderson State +^	6	–	1	–	0	9	–	3	–	0
No. 10 Arkansas–Monticello	5	–	2	–	0	7	–	2	–	0
No. 17 Ouachita Baptist	5	–	2	–	0	7	–	3	–	0
Southern Arkansas	3	–	4	–	0	5	–	5	–	0
Harding	2	–	5	–	0	5	–	5	–	0
Arkansas Tech	1	–	6	–	0	1	–	9	–	0
Arkansas–Pine Bluff	0	–	7	–	0	2	–	8	–	0
+ – Conference co-champions; ^ – NAIA Division I playoff participant; Rankings from NAIA Division I poll

1985 Central States Intercollegiate Conference football standings
	Conf.					Overall
Team	W		L		T	W		L		T
No. 3 Pittsburg State $^	6	–	1	–	0	8	–	2	–	0
No. 12 Fort Hays State	5	–	2	–	0	7	–	2	–	1
Missouri Southern	4	–	3	–	0	6	–	4	–	0
Emporia State	3	–	4	–	0	6	–	4	–	0
Wayne State (NE)	3	–	4	–	0	4	–	6	–	0
Kearney State	3	–	4	–	0	3	–	6	–	0
Washburn	2	–	5	–	0	4	–	6	–	0
Missouri Western	2	–	5	–	0	3	–	7	–	0
$ – Conference champion; ^ – NAIA Division I playoff participant; Rankings from NAIA Division I poll

1985 Columbia Football League standings
	Conf.					Overall
Team	W		L		T	W		L		T
Northern Division
No. 3 Pacific Lutheran x^	6	–	0	–	0	10	–	1	–	1
No. 15 Puget Sound	4	–	2	–	0	7	–	2	–	0
Central Washington	3	–	3	–	0	5	–	4	–	0
Simon Fraser	3	–	3	–	0	4	–	5	–	0
Whitworth	3	–	3	–	0	3	–	6	–	0
Western Washington	1	–	4	–	1	2	–	6	–	1
Eastern Oregon	0	–	5	–	1	0	–	8	–	2
Southern Division
No. 5 Linfield x^	6	–	0	–	0	8	–	2	–	0
No. 8 Western Oregon *	5	–	1	–	0	8	–	2	–	0
Willamette	4	–	2	–	0	6	–	2	–	1
Southern Oregon	2	–	3	–	0	2	–	6	–	1
Oregon Tech	1	–	4	–	0	1	–	7	–	0
Lewis & Clark	1	–	5	–	0	3	–	6	–	0
Pacific (OR)	1	–	5	–	0	2	–	7	–	0
x – Division champion/co-champions; * – NAIA Division I playoff participant ^ – NAIA Division II playoff participant; Rankings from NAIA Division I poll for Puget Sound and Western Oregon and NAIA Division II poll for Pacific Lutheran and Linfield

1985 Great Lakes Intercollegiate Athletic Conference football standings
	Conf.					Overall
Team	W		L		T	W		L		T
No. 2 Hillsdale $^	5	–	1	–	0	11	–	1	–	1
Saginaw Valley State	4	–	1	–	1	4	–	5	–	1
Ferris State	4	–	2	–	0	6	–	4	–	0
Grand Valley State	4	–	2	–	0	6	–	5	–	0
Northwood	2	–	3	–	1	3	–	4	–	2
Wayne State (MI)	1	–	5	–	0	1	–	8	–	1
Michigan Tech	0	–	6	–	0	1	–	9	–	0
$ – Conference champion; ^ – NAIA Division I playoff participant; Rankings from NAIA Division I poll

1985 Northern Intercollegiate Conference football standings
	Conf.					Overall
Team	W		L		T	W		L		T
Minnesota Duluth $	6	–	0	–	0	8	–	2	–	0
No. 9 Moorhead State	5	–	1	–	0	8	–	2	–	0
Bemidji State	3	–	3	–	0	7	–	3	–	0
Southwest State (MN)	3	–	3	–	0	6	–	4	–	0
Minnesota Morris	3	–	3	–	0	3	–	7	–	0
Northern State	1	–	5	–	0	3	–	6	–	1
Winona State	0	–	6	–	0	2	–	9	–	0
$ – Conference champion; Rankings from NAIA Division I poll

1985 Oklahoma Intercollegiate Conference football standings
	Conf.					Overall
Team	W		L		T	W		L		T
SW Oklahoma State +	3	–	1	–	0	5	–	3	–	1
East Central +	3	–	1	–	0	5	–	4	–	1
Northeastern State	2	–	2	–	0	6	–	4	–	0
SE Oklahoma State	1	–	3	–	0	5	–	6	–	0
NW Oklahoma State	1	–	3	–	0	4	–	6	–	0
+ – Conference co-champions

1985 Rocky Mountain Athletic Conference football standings
	Conf.					Overall
Team	W		L		T	W		L		T
No. 4 Mesa $^	7	–	0	–	0	9	–	2	–	0
No. 20 Fort Lewis	5	–	2	–	0	6	–	3	–	0
No. 19 New Mexico Highlands	4	–	3	–	0	7	–	3	–	0
Adams State	4	–	3	–	0	4	–	5	–	0
Southern Utah	2	–	4	–	1	3	–	5	–	0
Western New Mexico	2	–	5	–	0	3	–	7	–	0
Western State (CO)	2	–	5	–	0	2	–	7	–	0
Colorado Mines	1	–	5	–	1	2	–	5	–	1
$ – Conference champion; ^ – NAIA Division I playoff participant; Rankings from NAIA Division I poll

1985 South Atlantic Conference football standings
	Conf.					Overall
Team	W		L		T	W		L		T
No. 11 Mars Hill $	6	–	1	–	0	8	–	3	–	0
No. 14 Elon	5	–	2	–	0	7	–	3	–	0
No. 13 Newberry	4	–	2	–	1	7	–	3	–	1
No. 18 Presbyterian	4	–	2	–	1	7	–	3	–	1
Carson–Newman	3	–	4	–	0	5	–	5	–	0
Gardner–Webb	2	–	5	–	0	6	–	5	–	0
Catawba	2	–	5	–	0	5	–	6	–	0
Lenoir–Rhyne	1	–	6	–	0	3	–	8	–	0
$ – Conference champion; Rankings from NAIA Division I poll

1985 West Virginia Intercollegiate Athletic Conference football standings
	Conf.					Overall
Team	W		L		T	W		L		T
No. 5 Salem $^	6	–	1	–	0	8	–	3	–	0
No. 16 Fairmont State	5	–	2	–	0	7	–	3	–	0
Concord	5	–	2	–	0	6	–	3	–	1
Shepherd	5	–	2	–	0	5	–	5	–	0
West Virginia Tech	4	–	3	–	0	6	–	4	–	0
West Liberty State	2	–	5	–	0	2	–	8	–	0
Glenville State	1	–	6	–	0	2	–	7	–	0
West Virginia State	0	–	7	–	0	3	–	8	–	0
$ – Conference champion; ^ – NAIA Division I playoff participant; Rankings from NAIA Division I poll

1985 NAIA Division I independents football records
	Conf.			Overall
Team	W	L	T	W		L		T
No. 1 Central State (OK) ^		–		7	–	2	–	1
Guilford		–		5	–	3	–	1
Cameron		–		3	–	7	–	1
Wofford		–		3	–	8	–	0
Langston		–		2	–	6	–	0
West Virginia Wesleyan		–		1	–	8	–	0
^ – NAIA Division I playoff participant; Rankings from NAIA Division I poll

== Conference champions ==
Conference	Champion	Record
Arkansas	Central Arkansas; Henderson State	6–1; 6–1
Central States	Pittsburg State	6–1
NIC	Minnesota–Duluth	6–0
Oklahoma	East Central State; Southwestern Oklahoma State	3–1
RMAC	Mesa	7–0
South Atlantic	Mars Hill	6–1
WVIAC	Salem (WV)	6–1

== Postseason ==
Quarterfinals; December 7, 1985; Campus sites
Salem (WV)	15
Hillsdale*	18
Western Oregon	32
Mesa*	39
Central State (OK)	15
Henderson State*	18
Central Arkansas	32
Pittsburg State*	22

Semifinals; December 14, 1985; Campus sites
Hillsdale (OT)	24
Mesa*	21
Henderson State	9
Central Arkansas*	21

1985 Champion Bowl; December 21, 1985; Conway, AR
Hillsdale	10
Central Arkansas'*	10

== See also ==
- 1985 NAIA Division II football season
- 1985 NCAA Division I-A football season
- 1985 NCAA Division I-AA football season
- 1985 NCAA Division II football season
- 1985 NCAA Division III football season
