= 1992 NAIA Division I football season =

American college football season

- Regular season: August–November 1992
- Postseason: November 21–December 12, 1992
- National Championship: Ernest W. Spangler Stadium; Boiling Springs, NC
- Champions: Central State (OH) (2)

The 1992 NAIA Division I football season was the 37th season of college football sponsored by the NAIA, was the 23rd season of play of the NAIA's top division for football.

The season was played from August to November 1992 and culminated in the 1992 NAIA Champion Bowl playoffs and the 1992 NAIA Champion Bowl, played this year on December 12, 1992 at Ernest W. Spangler Stadium in Boiling Springs, North Carolina, on the campus of Gardner–Webb College.

The Central State (OH) defeated the Gardner–Webb Runnin' Bulldogs in the Champion Bowl, 19–16, to win their second NAIA national title. It was the Marauders' third consecutive appearance in the Champion Bowl, going 1–1 in the previous two.

== Conference standings ==
1992 Arkansas Intercollegiate Conference football standings
	Conf.					Overall
Team	W		L		T	W		L		T
No. 2 Central Arkansas $^	6	–	0	–	0	9	–	2	–	1
No. T–7 Harding ^	4	–	2	–	0	7	–	4	–	0
No. 16 Arkansas–Monticello	4	–	2	–	0	6	–	4	–	0
Henderson State	3	–	3	–	0	4	–	6	–	1
Arkansas Tech	2	–	4	–	0	4	–	5	–	1
Ouachita Baptist	1	–	5	–	0	2	–	9	–	0
Southern Arkansas	1	–	5	–	0	1	–	10	–	0
+ – Conference co-champions; ^ – NAIA Division I playoff participant; Rankings from NAIA Division I poll

1992 West Virginia Intercollegiate Athletic Conference football standings
	Conf.					Overall
Team	W		L		T	W		L		T
No. 6 Shepherd $^	7	–	0	–	0	8	–	4	–	0
No. T–7 Concord ^	6	–	1	–	0	7	–	3	–	1
No. 15 Glenville State	5	–	2	–	0	6	–	4	–	0
No. 17 West Virginia State	4	–	3	–	0	6	–	4	–	0
Fairmont State	3	–	4	–	0	4	–	6	–	0
West Liberty State	2	–	5	–	0	3	–	7	–	0
West Virginia Wesleyan	1	–	6	–	0	3	–	7	–	0
West Virginia Tech	0	–	7	–	0	0	–	10	–	0
$ – Conference champion; ^ – NAIA Division I playoff participant; Rankings from NAIA Division I poll

1992 Northern Sun Intercollegiate Conference football standings
	Conf.					Overall
Team	W		L		T	W		L		T
No. 14 Northern State $	5	–	1	–	0	6	–	5	–	0
No. 13 Southwest State (MN)	4	–	1	–	1	6	–	3	–	1
Minnesota Duluth	4	–	1	–	1	5	–	5	–	1
Moorhead State	3	–	3	–	0	4	–	5	–	0
Bemidji State	2	–	4	–	0	2	–	8	–	0
Winona State	0	–	6	–	0	2	–	9	–	0
Minnesota Morris	1	–	5	–	0	2	–	9	–	0
$ – Conference champion; Rankings from NAIA Division I poll

1992 South Atlantic Conference football standings
	Conf.					Overall
Team	W		L		T	W		L		T
No. 3 Gardner–Webb $^	7	–	0	–	0	12	–	2	–	0
No. 5 Carson–Newman ^	6	–	1	–	0	8	–	3	–	0
No. 9 Elon	5	–	2	–	0	8	–	2	–	0
Catawba	3	–	4	–	0	4	–	6	–	0
Presbyterian	3	–	4	–	0	4	–	7	–	0
No. 18 Lenoir–Rhyne	2	–	5	–	0	5	–	5	–	0
Mars Hill	1	–	6	–	0	2	–	8	–	1
Wingate	1	–	6	–	0	1	–	9	–	0
$ – Conference champion; ^ – NAIA Division I playoff participant; Rankings from NAIA Division I poll

1992 Oklahoma Intercollegiate Conference football standings
	Conf.					Overall
Team	W		L		T	W		L		T
No. 4 SW Oklahoma State +^	4	–	1	–	0	8	–	2	–	0
No. 10 East Central +	4	–	1	–	0	6	–	3	–	0
No. 11 Northeastern State	3	–	2	–	0	5	–	2	–	2
No. 12 SE Oklahoma State	3	–	2	–	0	6	–	4	–	0
NW Oklahoma State	1	–	4	–	0	1	–	8	–	1
Langston	0	–	5	–	0	4	–	6	–	0
+ – Conference co-champions; ^ – NAIA Division I playoff participant; Rankings from NAIA Division I poll

1992 NAIA Division I independents football records
	Conf.			Overall
Team	W	L	T	W		L		T
No. 1 Central State (OH) ^		–		12	–	1	–	0
No. 20 St. Francis (IL)		–		4	–	5	–	0
No. 19 Western New Mexico		–		4	–	5	–	0
^ – NAIA Division I playoff participant; Rankings from NAIA Division I poll

== Conference champions ==
Conference	Champion	Record
AIC	Central Arkansas	6–0
Northern Sun	Northern State (SD)	5–1
Oklahoma	East Central; Southwestern Oklahoma State	4–1
WVIAC	Shepherd	7–0

== Rankings ==
Final NAIA Division I poll rankings:

Rank	Team (first place votes)	Record (thru Nov. 15)	Points
1	Central State (OH) (8)	9–1	216
2	Central Arkansas (2)	8–1–1	210
3	Gardner–Webb	10-1	198
4	Southwestern Oklahoma State	8–1	185
5	Carson–Newman	8–2	166
6	Shepherd	7–3	156
T–7	Concord (1)	7–2–1	144
T–7	Harding	7–3	144
9	Elon	7–3	140
10	East Central	6–3	131
11	Northeastern State	5–2–2	114
12	Southeastern Oklahoma State	6–4	89
13	Southwest State (MN)	6–3–1	79
14	Northern State	6–5	74
15	Glenville State	6–4	69
16	Arkansas–Monticello	6–4	63
17	West Virginia State	6–4	58
18	Lenoir–Rhyne	5–5	32
19	Western New Mexico	4–5	22
20	St. Francis (IL)	4–5	13

== Postseason ==
Quarterfinals; November 21, 1992; Campus sites
Central Arkansas	14
SW Oklahoma State*	2
Central State (OH)	34
Harding*	0
Shepherd	6
Carson–Newman*	3
Concord	21
Gardner–Webb*	28

Semifinals; December 5, 1992; Campus sites
Central Arkansas	23
Central State (OH)*	30
Shepherd	7
Gardner–Webb*	22

1992 Champion Bowl; December 12, 1992; Boiling Springs, NC
Central State (OH)	19
Gardner–Webb*	16

== See also ==
- 1992 NCAA Division I-A football season
- 1992 NCAA Division I-AA football season
- 1992 NCAA Division II football season
- 1992 NCAA Division III football season
