= Colorado Mesa Mavericks =

College athletic teams in Colorado

- University: Colorado Mesa University
- Nickname: Mavericks
- NCAA: Division II
- Conference: RMAC
- Athletic director: Rob Courtney
- Location: Grand Junction, Colorado
- Varsity teams: 28 (10 men's, 11 women's, 4 co-ed)
- Football stadium: Ralph Stocker Stadium
- Basketball arena: Brownson Arena
- Baseball stadium: The Diamond at Hamilton Ballpark
- Soccer stadium: Community Hospital Unity Field
- Colors: Maroon, white, and gold
- Mascot: Rowdy
- Website: cmumavericks.com

The Colorado Mesa Mavericks (formerly Mesa State Mavericks) are the athletic teams that represent Colorado Mesa University, located in Grand Junction, Colorado, in NCAA Division II intercollegiate sports. The Mavericks compete as members of the Rocky Mountain Athletic Conference for all 28 varsity sports.

== Varsity sports ==
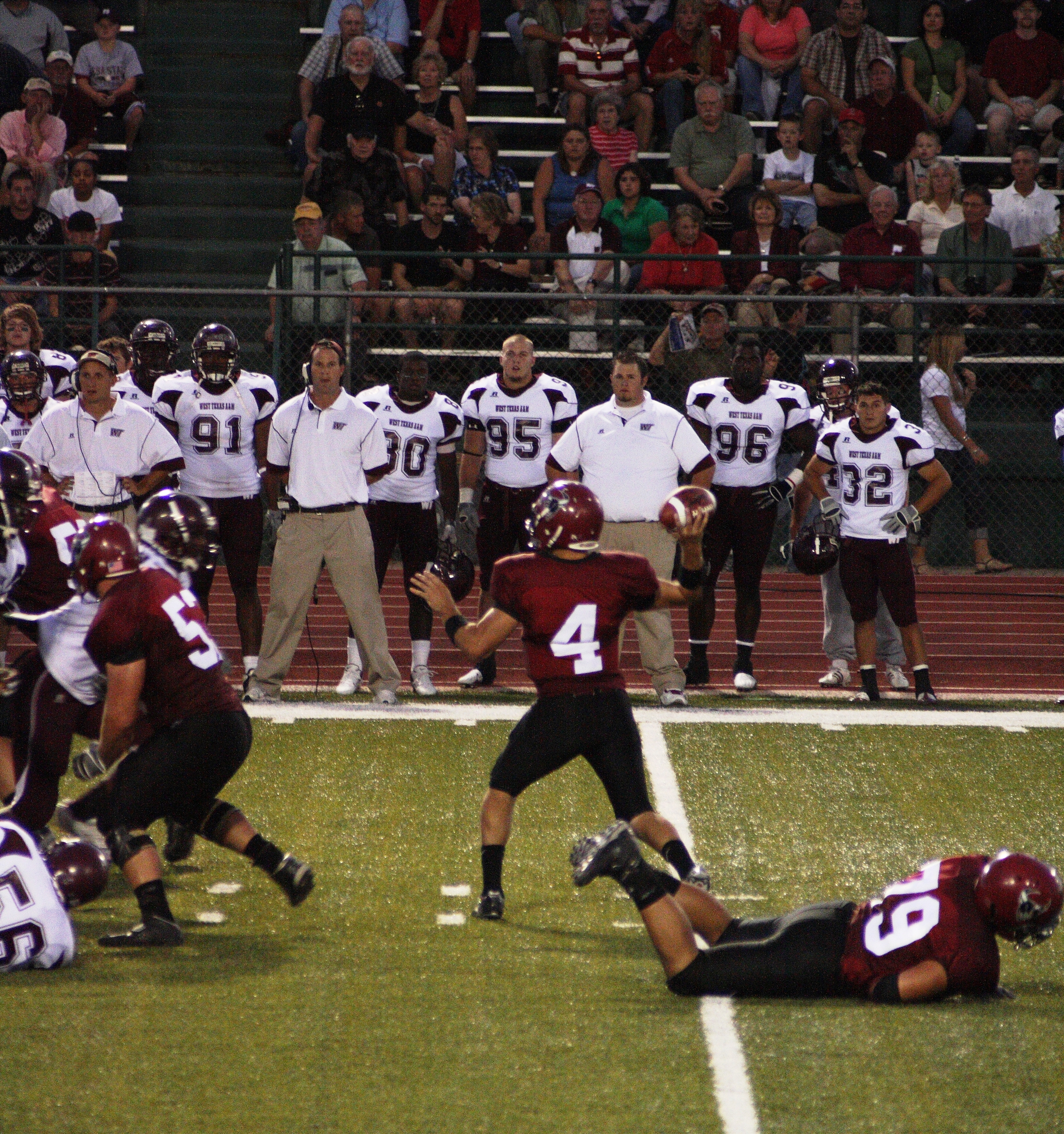
Colorado Mesa football team in 2008

=== Teams ===
Men's sports	Women's sports
Baseball	Basketball
Basketball	Beach volleyball
Cross country	Cross country
Football	Golf
Golf	Lacrosse
Lacrosse	Soccer
Soccer	Softball
Swimming and diving	Swimming and diving
Tennis	Tennis
Track and field^{1}	Track and field^{1}
Triathlon	Triathlon
Wrestling	Volleyball
	Wrestling
^{1} – includes both indoor and outdoor

Beach volleyball is a fully sanctioned NCAA sport which had its first national championship in the spring of 2016. The Colorado Mesa team competes as an independent.

== Club sports ==
In addition to varsity sports, CMU has a large number of club sports which include alpine skiing, Nordic skiing, cycling, ice hockey, e-sports, rodeo, and women's rugby.

== Facilities ==
- Bus Bergman Sports Complex
  - CMU Football Practice Field
  - CMU Softball Field – Softball
  - The Diamond at Hamilton Ballpark – Baseball (primary) (Note: Colorado Mesa Baseball has played the majority of their home games at Hamilton Ballpark on the CMU campus since its construction in 2022. Prior to this, the team played its home games at the city-owned Suplizio Field.)
  - O'Brien Track & Field Complex – Track & Field
- Brownson Arena – Basketball, Volleyball, Wrestling
- CMU Beach Courts – Beach Volleyball
- CMU Rugby Pitch – Rugby (Note: Colorado Mesa's men's and women's rugby teams compete in National Collegiate Rugby.)
- Community Hospital Unity Field – Soccer, Lacrosse
- Elliott Tennis Complex – Tennis
- El Pomar Natatorium – Swimming & Diving
- Lincoln Park Golf Course – Golf
- Ralph Stocker Stadium – Football
- River City Sportsplex – Hockey (Note: Colorado Mesa's men's hockey team competes in the American Collegiate Hockey Association.)
- Sam Suplizio Field – Baseball (secondary)

== Program notes ==
Since 1958, Grand Junction has co-hosted the NJCAA Junior College World Series at Suplizio Field, unassociated to the CMU Athletic Department

CMU plays host to several summer sports camps and clinics including baseball, football, cross country, cheerleading, lacrosse, swimming, soccer, track and field, volleyball, and wrestling, as well as the largest summer basketball camp west of the Mississippi River.
