= Gardner–Webb Runnin' Bulldogs football =

Intercollegiate American football team

| 2026 Gardner–Webb Runnin' Bulldogs football team |
- First season: 1970; 56 years ago
- Athletic director: Andrew T. Goodrich
- Head coach: Pete Bennett (Interim); 1st season, 0–0 (–)
- Location: Boiling Springs, North Carolina
- Stadium: Ernest W. Spangler Stadium (capacity: 9,000)
- NCAA division: Division I FCS
- Conference: Ohio Valley
- Colors: Red and black
- All-time record: 281–322–2 (.466)

Conference championships
- SAC: 1987, 1992 Big South: 2002, 2003, 2022 OVC–Big South: 2023
- Marching band: The Sounds of the Springs
- Website: gwusports.com

The Gardner–Webb Runnin' Bulldogs football program is the intercollegiate American football team for Gardner–Webb University in the U.S. state of North Carolina. The team competes in the Division I FCS and are an affiliate member of the Ohio Valley Conference for football. Gardner–Webb's first football team was fielded in 1970. The team plays its home games at the 9,000-seat Ernest W. Spangler Stadium in Boiling Springs, North Carolina. The Runnin' Bulldogs are coached by interim head coach Pete Bennett.

== History ==
=== Classifications ===
- 1970–1992: NAIA Division I
- 1993–1999: NCAA Division II
- 2000–present: NCAA Division I-AA/FCS

== Conference affiliations ==
- NAIA Independent (1970–1974)
- South Atlantic Conference (1975–1999)
- NCAA Division I-AA Independent (2000–2001)
- Big South Conference (2002–2022)
- OVC–Big South Football Association (2023–2025)
- Ohio Valley Conference (2026–present)

== Conference championships ==
| Year | Coach | Conference | Overall record | Conference record |
|---|---|---|---|---|
| 1987 | Woody Fish | South Atlantic Conference | 11–2 | 6–1 |
| 1992 | Woody Fish | South Atlantic Conference | 12–2 | 7–0 |
| 2002 | Steve Patton | Big South Conference | 9–1 | 3–0 |
| 2003 | Steve Patton | Big South Conference | 8–4 | 4–0 |
| 2022 | Tre Lamb | Big South Conference | 7–6 | 5–0 |
| 2023† | Tre Lamb | Big South–OVC Football Association | 7–5 | 5–1 |
| Conference Championships | | | 6 | |

† denotes co-championship

== Playoff results ==
=== NAIA ===
The Runnin' Bulldogs appeared in the NAIA playoffs two times, with an overall record of 3–2.

| Year | Round | Opponent | Result |
|---|---|---|---|
| 1987 | First Round; Quarterfinals | Moorhead State; Carson–Newman | W, 27–7; L, 24–27 |
| 1992 | Quarterfinals; Semifinals; National Championship Game | Concord; Shepherd; Central State | W, 28–21; W, 22–7; L, 16–19 |

=== Division I FCS ===
The Runnin' Bulldogs have appeared in the NCAA Division I FCS playoffs two times, with an overall record of 1–2.

| Year | Round | Opponent | Result |
|---|---|---|---|
| 2022 | First Round; Second Round | Eastern Kentucky; William & Mary | W, 52–41; L, 14–54 |
| 2023 | First Round | Mercer | L, 7–17 |

== Notable former players ==
- Dobson Collins – NFL wide receiver
- Woody Fish – American football player and coach
- Terry Guess – NFL wide receiver for New Orleans Saints
- Bobby Hopkins – American football offensive guard and World champion arm-wrestler
- Brian Johnson – NFL linebacker for Kansas City Chiefs and Detroit Lions
- Todd Knight – American football player and coach
- T. J. Luther – NFL wide receiver
- Jim Maxwell – NFL linebacker for the New York Giants, San Francisco 49ers, Miami Dolphins, and Cincinnati Bengals
- Carroll McCray – American football player and coach
- Gabe Wilkins – NFL defensive tackle for Green Bay Packers and San Francisco 49ers, Super Bowl XXXI champion

== Future non-conference opponents ==
Future non-conference opponents announced as of October 5, 2026.

| 2027 | 2028 | 2029 | 2030 |
|---|---|---|---|
| at Arkansas | at Virginia Tech | at Alabama | at Chattanooga |
| at Georgia State | at The Citadel | | |
