= Larry Richmond =

American football coach

Playing career
- 1970–1972: Harding
- Positions: Defensive end, linebacker

Coaching career (HC unless noted)
- 1978–1979: Ouachita Christian HS (LA)
- 1983–1987: Dallas Christian (TX)
- 1988–1993: Harding

Head coaching record
- Overall: 37–25–1 (college)
- Tournaments: 0–2 (NAIA playoffs)

Accomplishments and honors

Championships
- 1 AIC (1989)

Larry Richmond is a former American football coach. He served as the head football coach at Harding University in Searcy, Arkansas from 1988 to 1993, compiling a record of 37–25–1. Richmond's 1989 Harding squad won the Arkansas Intercollegiate Conference championship.

A native of West Memphis, Arkansas, Richmond played defensive end and linebacker at Harding under head coach John Prock from 1970 to 1972.

== Head coaching record ==
=== College ===
Year	Team	Overall	Conference	Standing	Bowl/playoffs
Harding Bisons (Arkansas Intercollegiate Conference) (1988–1993)
1988	Harding	4–6	1–5	T–6th	
1989	Harding	7–4	5–1	T–1st	L NAIA Division I Quarterfinal
1990	Harding	6–4	3–3	T–4th	
1991	Harding	7–3–1	4–1–1	2nd	
1992	Harding	7–4	4–2	2nd	L NAIA Division I Quarterfinal
1993	Harding	6–4	2–2	3rd	
Harding:		37–25–1	19–14–1		
Total:		37–25–1			
National championship Conference title Conference division title or championship game berth
