= Ronnie Huckeba =

American football coach

Playing career
- 1973–1976: Harding
- Position: Offensive lineman

Coaching career (HC unless noted)
- 1979: Carlisle HS (AR) (assistant)
- 1980: Fort Worth Christian (TX) (assistant)
- 1981–1985: Ouachita Christian HS (LA) (co-HC)
- 1986–2007: Harding (assistant)
- 2007–2016: Harding

Head coaching record
- Overall: 69–40 (college)
- Bowls: 1–0
- Tournaments: 2–3 (NCAA D-II playoffs)

Accomplishments and honors

Championships
- 1 GAC (2016)

Awards
- AFCA Coach of the Year Region 4 (2016); Gulf South Co-Coach of The Year (2010)

Ronnie Huckeba is a retired American football coach. He was the head coach at Harding University in Searcy, Arkansas from 2007 to 2016. He compiled a record of 69–40, winning a Great American Conference championship and reaching the quarterfinals of the NCAA Division II Football Championship playoffs in his final season.

Huckeba was an offensive lineman for Harding from 1973 to 1976, starting at offensive guard on the Bisons' 1976 Arkansas Intercollegiate Conference co-championship squad. He coached high school football in Arkansas, Texas and Louisiana before coming back to Harding as an assistant coach for John Prock.

One of his sons, Jeb Huckeba, played defensive end for the Arkansas Razorbacks and later played for two seasons with the Seattle Seahawks.

Following his retirement from coaching in 2016, Huckeba took on his current role as the senior advancement officer at Harding.

== Head coaching record ==
=== College ===
Year	Team	Overall	Conference	Standing	Bowl/playoffs	AFCA^{#}
Harding Bisons (Gulf South Conference) (2007–2010)
2007	Harding	5–3 (Note: Randy Tribble served as Harding's head coach for the first two games of the 2007 season, both non-conference contests, before resigning. Harding had an overall record of 6–4 on the season.)	5–3	5th		
2008	Harding	2–9	1–7	10th		
2009	Harding	5–6	3–5	T–8th		
2010	Harding	6–4	4–4	T–6th		
Harding Bisons (Great American Conference) (2011–2016)
2011	Harding	4–7	3–3	T–4th		
2012	Harding	9–2	7–1	2nd	L NCAA Division II First Round	19
2013	Harding	9–2	8–2	2nd	W Live United Texarkana Bowl	
2014	Harding	9–2	9–1	2nd	L NCAA Division II First Round	17
2015	Harding	7–4	7–4	T–4th		
2016	Harding	13–1	11–0	1st	L NCAA Division II Quarterfinal	6
Harding:		69–40	58–30			
Total:		69–40				
National championship Conference title Conference division title or championship game berth
^{#}Rankings from final AFCA poll.
