= Nicodemus National Historic Site =

National Historic Site of the United States

- Location within Kansas Location within the United States
- Location: Nicodemus, Kansas, United States
- Nearest city: Nicodemus, Kansas
- Coordinates: 39°23′27″N 99°37′03″W
- Area: 161 acres (65 ha)
- Established: November 12, 1996
- Visitors: 6,644 (in 2025)
- Governing body: National Park Service
- Website: Nicodemus National Historic Site

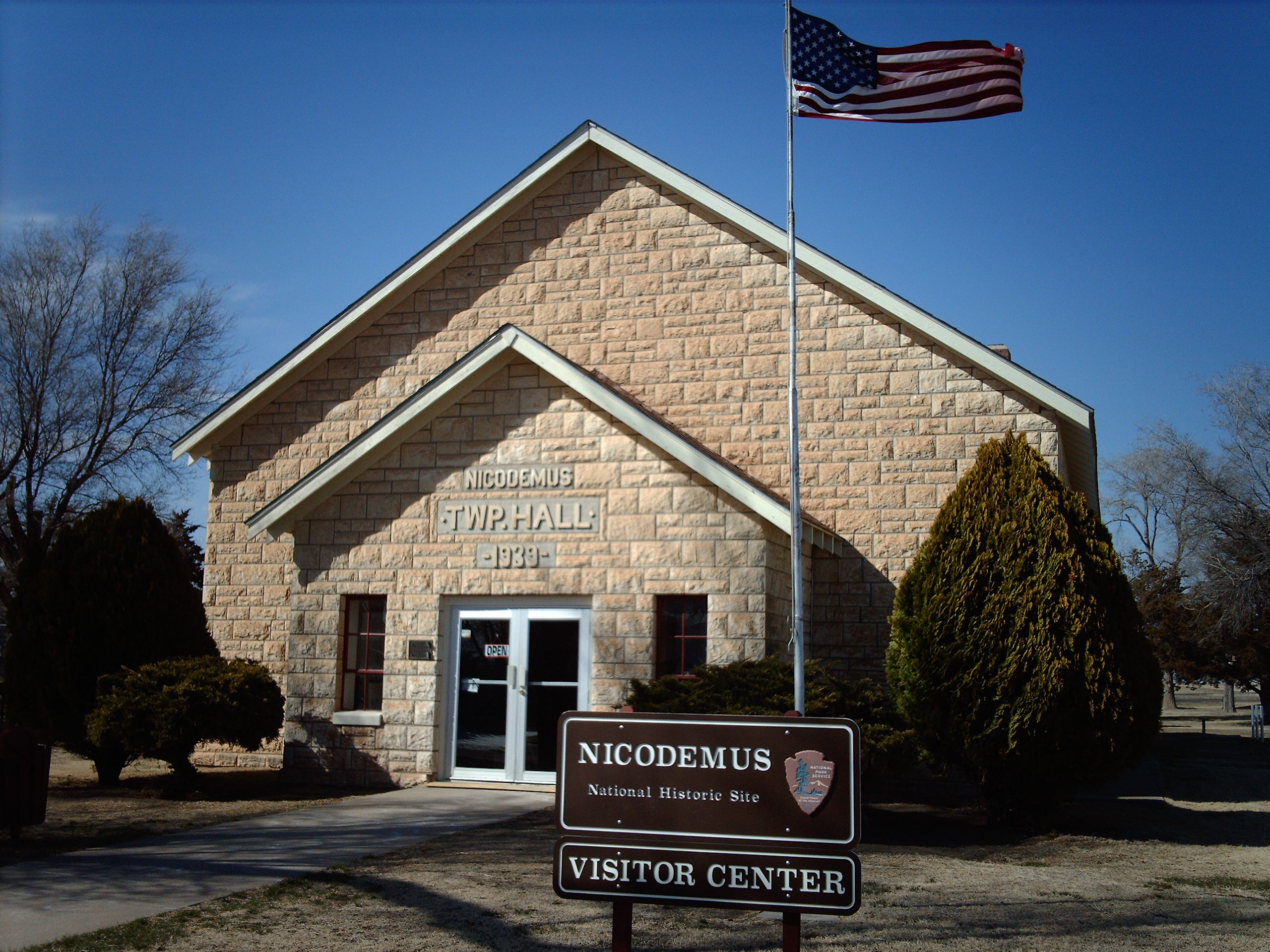
Township Hall in Nicodemus

Nicodemus National Historic Site, located in Nicodemus, Kansas, United States, preserves, protects and interprets the only remaining western town established by African Americans during the Reconstruction Period following the American Civil War. The town of Nicodemus is symbolic of the pioneer spirit of African Americans who dared to leave the only region they had been familiar with to seek personal freedom and the opportunity to develop their talents and capabilities. The site was named, at least in part, for a legendary African-American slave featured in abolitionist Henry Clay Work's "Wake, Nicodemus (1864)." It is a mystical story of an old slave died away and buried in a hollow tree who had asked to be awakened on the Day of Jubilee.

== Buildings ==
The historic site contains five buildings:

- Township Hall (now home to a temporary visitor center)
- African Methodist Episcopal Church
- First Baptist Church
- St. Francis Hotel
- Nicodemus School District #1 Schoolhouse

== History ==
Nicodemus was founded in 1877, led by Rev. W.H. Smith, a black minister, and W.R. Hill, a white land developer, and five other black men who formed the Nicodemus Town Company and began visiting churches in Kentucky to encourage people to move to Kansas. Kansas was a free state, part of the Underground Railroad and home to abolitionist John Brown. Handbills and flyers distributed by the company called Nicodemus a place for "African Americans to establish a black self-government."

By the mid-1880s Nicodemus was a small, bustling town. There were two newspapers, three general stores and at least three churches. The town had a number of small hotels, an ice cream parlor, bank, livery and a number of homes. The population was an estimated 700 at the town's heyday.

To ensure growth the town needed the railroad. The residents of Nicodemus made several attempts to reach out to various railroad companies in an attempt to attract a rail line to Nicodemus, but it was all to no avail. The railroad passed to the south. Over time people moved closer to the railway and established a new town called Bogue. Bogue has a population of 173 today.

Perhaps one of Nicodemus's most famous residents is Veryl Switzer. Switzer was an All-American football player for Kansas State in 1951, 1952 and 1953. He went on to play two seasons for the National Football League Green Bay Packers, before taking leave to serve in the U.S. Air Force. He resumed his professional career with the Packers after 2½ years in the military. He later went on to play for the Calgary Stampeders and the Montreal Alouettes of the Canadian Football League before retiring.

Switzer is now farming 840 acres (3.4 km^{2}), in Nicodemus, and is one of the top investors in the creation of a flour mill there. A co-op was formed in 1999; and, while "Promised Land Flour" and "Nicodemus Pancake Mix" are being marketed, the flour mill has not yet been built.

The site is still home to several descendants of the original settlers.

In 1976, Nicodemus was designated a National Historic Landmark. It was designated a National Historic Site by an Act of Congress in 1996.

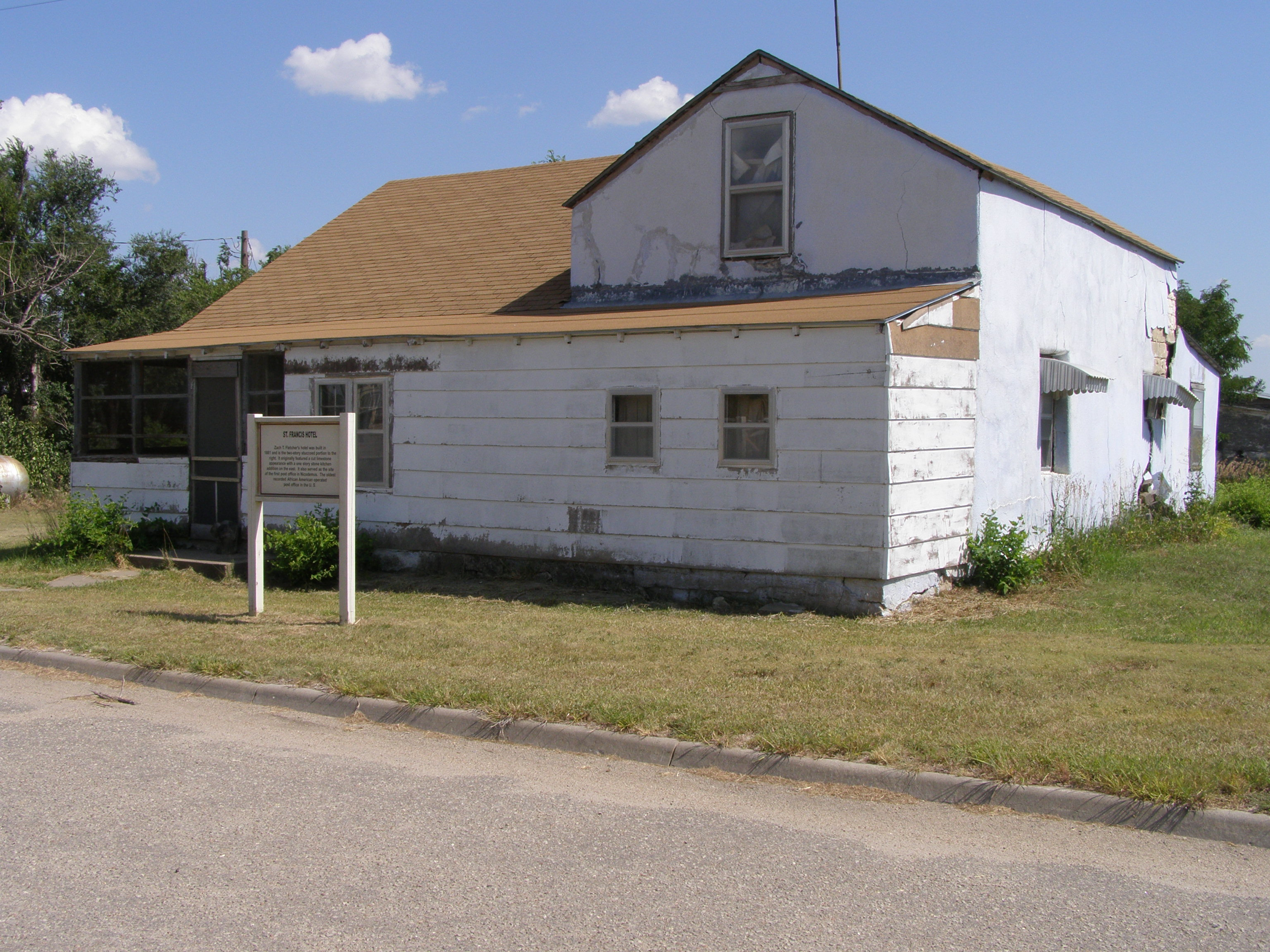
St Francis Hotel

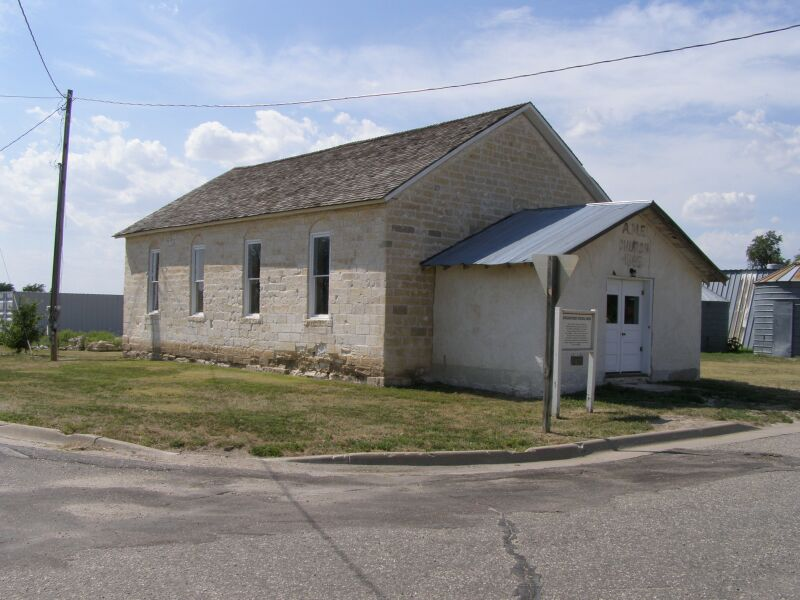
African Methodist Episcopal Church

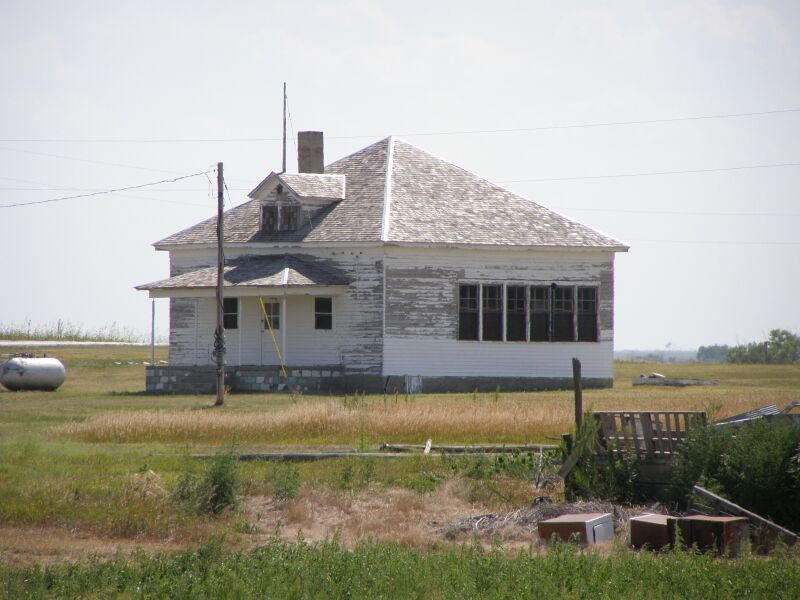
Nicodemus Township School

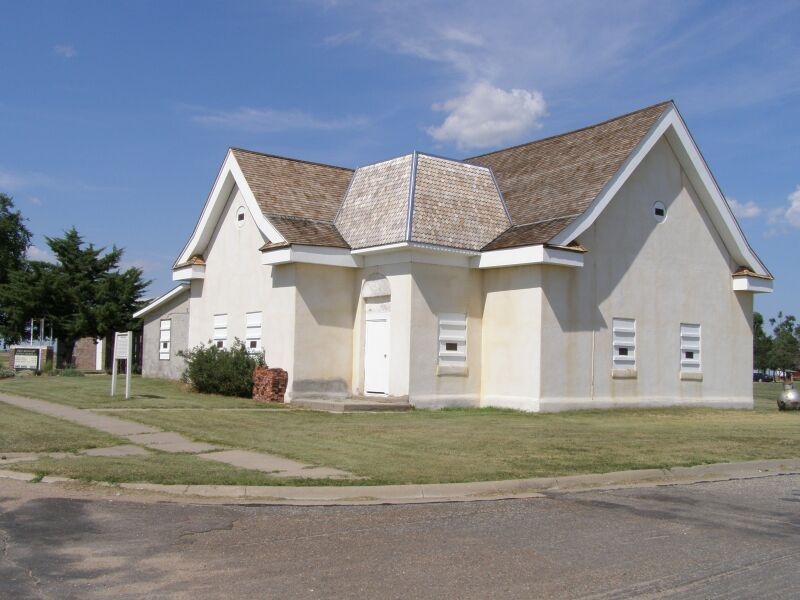
First Baptist Church

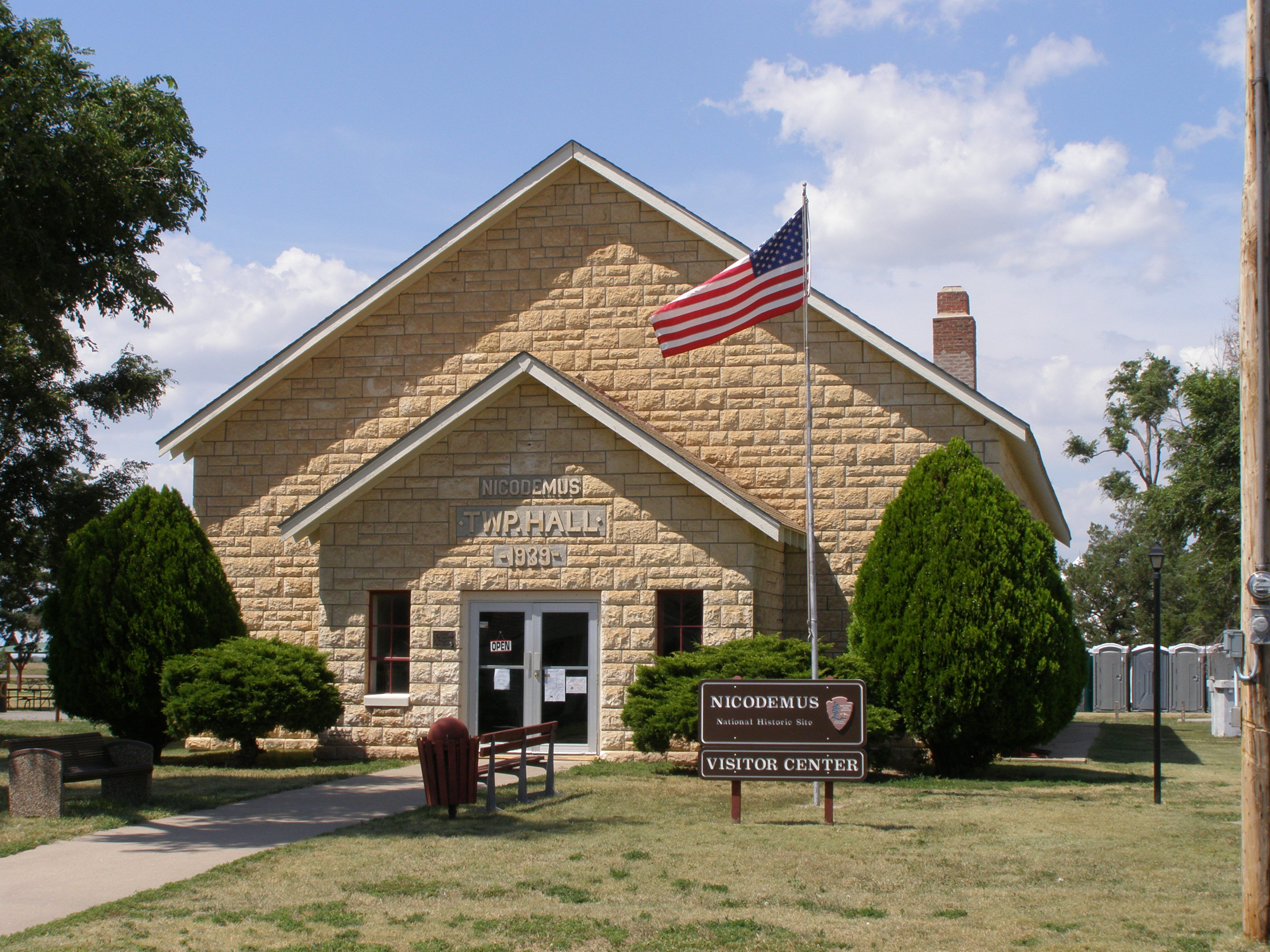
Township Hall

== See also ==
- History of African Americans in Kansas
