= Earl Thompson =

Earl Thompson or Thomson may refer to:

- Earl Thomson (1895–1971), Canadian Olympic hurdler
- Earl A. Thompson (1891–1967), American engineer and inventor
- Earl Thompson (author) (1931–1978), American author
- Earl B. Thompson (died 1924), American football coach
- Earl Foster Thomson (1900–1971), American Olympic equestrian
- Scottie Thompson (basketball) (Earl Scottie Carreon Thompson, born 1993), Filipino basketball player
