= John Niles =

John Niles may refer to:

- John Milton Niles (1787–1856), American lawyer and politician
- John Jacob Niles (1892–1980), American composer and singer
- John Niles (scholar) (born 1945), American scholar of medieval English literature
- John W. Niles (1876–1961), Canadian politician in the Legislative Assembly of New Brunswick
- John Wayne Niles, American Reconstruction era political organizer
