= 1959 Harding Bisons football team =

American college football season

1959 Harding Bisons football
- Conference: Independent
- Record: 1–5
- Head coach: Carl Allison (1st season)
- Home stadium: Alumni Field

1959 NAIA independents football records
	Conf.			Overall
Team	W	L	T	W		L		T
Austin		–		8	–	2	–	0
No. 9 McMurry		–		8	–	2	–	0
No. 8 Southern Connecticut State ^		–		8	–	2	–	0
Georgetown (KY)		–		5	–	2	–	0
Oklahoma Panhandle State		–		4	–	5	–	1
Eastern New Mexico		–		4	–	6	–	0
La Verne		–		3	–	6	–	0
Carson–Newman		–		1	–	7	–	1
Earlham		–		1	–	7	–	0
^ – NAIA playoff participant; Rankings from NAIA poll

The 1959 Harding Bisons football team represented Harding College as an independent during the 1959 college football season. Led by first-year head coach Carl Allison, the Bisons compiled a record of 1–5. Harding's 1959 team was the first football team fielded by the school since 1931, having been shut down during the Great Depression due to financial strain.

== Schedule ==
Date	Opponent	Site	Result
October 3	Itawamba	Searcy, AR	L 0–19
October 10	Arkansas State freshmen	Searcy, AR	W 7–6
October 17	at Tennessee–Martin	Martin, TN	L 13–33
October 24	Southern State (AR)	Searcy, AR	L 14–42
October 31	at Delta State	Cleveland, MS	L 7–60
November 7	at Mississippi College	Clinton, MS	L 7–47

== Personnel ==
=== Roster ===
- 10 Jerry Smith B - 155 Fr. - Eudora, Ark.
- 11 Jim Jackson B - 175 Fr. - Searcy, Ark.
- 12 Lewis Walker B - 165 So. - Earle, Ark.
- 17 Lathan Garnett B - 160 Jr. - Lonoke, Ark.
- 22 Don Berryhill B - 150 So. - Searcy, Ark.
- 23 Wendell Harrison B - 150 Fr. - Harrisburg, Ark.
- 25 Jerry Mote B - 155 Fr. - Gainesville, Texas
- 30 Ken Cottrell B - 150 So. - Suffolk, Va.
- 32 Ray Griffin B - 160 Fr. - Greenwood, Ark.
- 33 John Collier B - 160 Fr. - Alvin, Texas
- 40 Billy Mac Smith B - 165 So. - Fort Worth, Texas
- 45 William Tinsley B - 185 Fr. - Stockton, Calif.
- 46 James Heath B - 165 So. - Little Rock, Ark.
- 50 Cliff Sharp C - 160 Jr. - Midway, Ark.
- 51 Curry Peacock C - 185 Jr. - Tiptonville, Tenn.
- 53 Sid Tate C - 180 Fr. - New Orleans, La.
- 60 Billy Joe Thrasher G - 186 Jr. - Decatur, Ala.
- 61 Marcus Walker G - 180 Fr. - Wellston, Mo.
- 63 Walter Mays G - 185 Fr. - Wellston, Mo.
- 64 Jerry Figgins G - 190 Sr. - Caruthersville, Mo.
- 65 Glen Randolph G - 160 So. - Sparta, Tenn.
- 66 J.L. Pate G - 187 So. - Aliceville, Ala.
- 70 Billy Hunter T - 196 Fr. - Kingman, Kan.
- 71 George Dumas T - 195 Sr. - Yorktown, Va.
- 72 Larry Lambert T - 200 Fr. - Oklahoma City, Okla.
- 73 Pete Williams T - 250 So. - Memphis, Tenn.
- 74 Robert Schneck T - 205 Fr. - Dubuque, Iowa
- 75 Ray Phillips T - 195 Fr. - Memphis, Tenn.
- 76 Richard Carter T - 196 So. - Baton Rouge, La.
- 80 Bob Tucker E - 180 Jr. - Oklahoma City, Okla.
- 82 Jim Citty E - 196 Jr. - Idabel, Okla.
- 83 Dave Harvey E - 175 Fr. - Long Beach, Calif.
- 84 Robert Arnold E - 190 Fr. - Pocahontas, Ark.
- 85 Ray Smith E - 175 Fr. - Little Rock, Ark.
- 86 Jerry Escue E - 170 So. - Brownsville, Tenn.

=== Coaching staff ===
- Carl Allison, head coach
- John Prock, assistant coach
- Dick Johnson, assistant coach
