= Randy Tribble =

American football coach

Current position
- Title: Head coach
- Team: Greenbrier HS (AR)

Playing career
- 1973–1976: Harding
- Position: Defensive back

Coaching career (HC unless noted)
- 1979–1980: Fort Worth Christian (TX)
- 1981–1993: Harding (assistant)
- 1994–2007: Harding
- 2008–present: Greenbrier HS (AR)

Head coaching record
- Overall: 73–63–1 (college)

Randy Tribble is an American football coach. He was the head football coach at Harding University in Searcy, Arkansas from 1994 to 2007, compiling a record of 73–63–1. He was an assistant coach at Harding for 13 years before becoming head coach.

A former all-conference defensive back at Harding under coach John Prock in the 1970s, Tribble was inducted into the Harding Athletics Hall of Fame in 1999.

== Head coaching record ==
=== College ===
Year	Team	Overall	Conference	Standing	Bowl/playoffs
Harding Bisons (Arkansas Intercollegiate Conference) (1994)
1994	Harding	5–4–1	3–1	2nd	
Harding Bisons (NAIA Division I independent) (1995–1996)
1995	Harding	4–6			
1996	Harding	6–4			
Harding Bisons (Lone Star Conference) (1997–1999)
1997	Harding	5–5	3–5 / 3–3	T–8th / T–4th (North)	
1998	Harding	7–4	5–3 / 5–3	7th / 3rd (North)	
1999	Harding	5–5	3–5 / 3–3	T–4th / T–8th (North)	
Harding Bisons (Gulf South Conference) (2000–2007)
2000	Harding	5–6	4–5	T–6th	
2001	Harding	4–6	4–5	T–7th	
2002	Harding	9–2	7–2	2nd	
2003	Harding	4–6	3–6	T–7th	
2004	Harding	6–5	5–4	5th	
2005	Harding	6–5	4–5	T–7th	
2006	Harding	6–4	5–3	T–5th	
2007	Harding	1–1 (Note: Tribble was Harding's head coach for the first two games of the 2007 season, both non-conference contests, before resigning. Ronnie Huckeba served as head coach for the final eight games of the season. Harding finished the year with an overall record of 6–4 with an mark of 5–3 in conference play, placing fifth in the Gulf South Conference.)	0–0		
Harding:		73–63–1	46–44		
Total:		73–63–1			
