= Carl Allison =

American football player and sports coach (1933–2013)

Biographical details
- Born: June 2, 1933; Krebs, Oklahoma, U.S.
- Died: December 3, 2013 (aged 80); West Monroe, Louisiana, U.S.

Playing career

Football
- 1951–1954: Oklahoma
- 1955: Chicago Bears*

Baseball
- 1952–1955: Oklahoma
- Position: End

Coaching career (HC unless noted)

Football
- 1955–1958: Clinton HS (OK)
- 1959–1963: Harding
- 1964–1965: Oklahoma (scout)

Baseball
- 1960–1963: Harding
- 1967–1969: Harding

Head coaching record
- Overall: 13–26–3 (college football); 24–16 (high school football)

Accomplishments and honors

Awards
- First-team All-Big Seven (1954); Second-team All-Big Seven (1953)

Carl Allison (June 2, 1933 – December 3, 2013) was an American football player and coach of football and baseball. He was a four-year starter for coach Bud Wilkinson at the University of Oklahoma from 1951 to 1954, finishing his career as the team captain of the undefeated 1954 Oklahoma Sooners football team. He also played four years for the baseball program from 1952 to 1955.

Of Allison, Wilkinson wrote, "I never hope to coach a finer football player (than Allison). Carl started every game we have played the last four years. He was never late to practice, never hurt, never sick. He was a fine captain. He is a straight B student. In reliability and character he stands at the very top of our squad. We could always depend on him to do his job well.

"I don't mean to take anything away from our other more-publicized boys but I've never seen a better all-around football player, nor a more reliable one, than Carl Allison."

Allison was also chosen for Notre Dame coach Frank Leahy's all-opponents team in both 1952 and 1953. He was later named to the Oklahoma Sooners 1950s All-Decade Team.

Allison was selected 263rd overall in the 22nd round of the 1955 NFL draft by the Chicago Bears, coached by George Halas.

Straight from Allison's brief time with the Chicago Bears, he became the head football coach at Clinton High School in Clinton, Oklahoma, compiling a record of 24–16. He then became the head football coach at Harding University in Searcy, Arkansas from 1959 to 1963, reinstating a program that had not competed since 1931. After re-establishing that program and turning it over to his top assistant and fellow Oklahoma native John Prock, Allison returned to work in 1964 and 1965 for Wilkinson's Oklahoma Sooners as a scout. He then later returned to Harding as baseball coach.

Allison later became a preacher at White's Ferry Road Church of Christ in West Monroe, Louisiana.

== Head coaching record ==
=== College football ===
Year	Team	Overall	Conference	Standing
Harding Bisons (Independent) (1959)
1959	Harding	1–5		
Harding Bisons (Arkansas Intercollegiate Conference) (1960–1963)
1960	Harding	1–5–3	1–5–2	8th
1961	Harding	4–5	4–3	4th
1962	Harding	6–3	4–3	4th
1963	Harding	1–8	0–7	8th
Harding:		13–26–3	9–18–2	
Total:		13–26–3		

=== College baseball ===
Record table
Season	Team	Overall	Conference	Standing	Postseason
Harding Bisons (Arkansas Intercollegiate Conference) (1960–1963)
1960	Harding	7–7	6–6	3rd	
1961	Harding	4–14			
1962	Harding	11–14–1	4–8	5th	
1963	Harding	7–1	3–9	7th	
Harding Bisons (Arkansas Intercollegiate Conference) (1967–1969)
1967	Harding	14–12	7–5	3rd	
1968	Harding	15–8	5–7		
1969	Harding	16–9	5–7	6th	
Harding:		74–76–1 (.493)			
Total:		74–76–1 (.493)			
