= Interstate Literary Association =

American educational organization

The Interstate Literary Association was established in 1892 in Topeka, Kansas. An education organization, their annual conventions were held in cities across the Midwest including Topeka, Kansas City, and Omaha.

In 1908, Omaha African American leader John Grant Pegg was elected president of the Interstate Literary Association of Kansas and the West with S. Joe Brown of Des Moines elected first vice president. Pegg's main opposition for the position was A. G. Hill of Des Moines, who was supported by Omahan Harrison J. Pinkett, while Pegg was supported by Omahan Henry V. Plummer. Pegg and Plummer's relationship later soured, although they appeared to bury the hatched in March 1909.

== See also ==
- History of African Americans in Kansas
- African Americans in Omaha, Nebraska
