= Gary Knafelc =

American football player (1932–2022)

No. 83, 84
- Positions: Wide receiver, tight end

Personal information
- Born: January 2, 1932; Pueblo, Colorado, U.S.
- Died: December 19, 2022 (aged 90); Clermont, Florida, U.S.
- Listed height: 6 ft 4 in (1.93 m)
- Listed weight: 217 lb (98 kg)

Career information
- High school: Central (Pueblo)
- College: Colorado (1950–1953)
- NFL draft: 1954: 2nd round, 14th overall pick

Career history
- Chicago Cardinals (1954); Green Bay Packers (1954–1962); San Francisco 49ers (1963)

Awards and highlights
- 2× NFL champion (1961, 1962); Green Bay Packers Hall of Fame (1976); Third-team All-American (1953); First-team All-Big Seven (1953)

Career NFL statistics
- Receptions: 154
- Receiving yards: 2,162
- Receiving touchdowns: 23
- Stats at Pro Football Reference

Gary Knafelc (/ˈknæfəl/ KNAF-əl; January 2, 1932 – December 19, 2022) was an American professional football player who was a wide receiver and a tight end in the National Football League (NFL) for ten seasons, primarily with the Green Bay Packers. He played one game at the start of his career with the Chicago Cardinals and his final season was with the San Francisco 49ers.

== Biography ==
Born and raised in Pueblo, Colorado, Knafelc graduated from its Central High School in 1950 and played college football at the University of Colorado in Boulder under head coach Dal Ward.

Knafelc was the 14th overall selection of the 1954 NFL draft, taken by the Chicago Cardinals, who traded him early that season to the Green Bay Packers. Knafelc signed with the Packers as a free agent two games into the 1954 season. Knafelc is the only player to ever be carried off the City Stadium or Lambeau Field turf by fans. That happened after he caught an 18-yard touchdown pass from Tobin Rote in the final minute to beat the Detroit Lions, 20–17, in the 1955 season opener on September 25.

Knafelc was a member of Vince Lombardi's first two NFL title teams in 1961 and 1962, and was inducted into the Packers Hall of Fame in 1976. He was the public address announcer for Packers games at Lambeau Field from 1964 until 2004, when he was succeeded by Bill Jartz of WBAY-TV.

Toward the end of his football career, Knafelc worked as an actor, under the stage name Gary Kincaid. He appeared in such films as Palm Springs Weekend and other B movies. His son, Greg Knafelc, played quarterback for the Notre Dame Fighting Irish and later with the New Orleans Saints and Green Bay Packers.

His Legacy lives on through his great nephew (Niklas Gerard) who plays for the South Bend Saint Joe Indian's Football Team.

Knafelc died at his home in Clermont, Florida, on December 19, 2022, at the age of 90.
