= 1972 Harding Bisons football team =

American college football season

1972 Harding Bisons football

AIC co-champion

Cowboy Bowl, W 30–27 vs. Langston
- Conference: Arkansas Intercollegiate Conference
- Record: 10–1 (5–1 AIC)
- Head coach: John Prock (9th season)
- Offensive scheme: Multiple, Triple option
- Home stadium: Alumni Stadium

1972 Arkansas Intercollegiate Conference football standings
| | Conf. | | | | | Overall |
| Team | W | | L | | T | W | | L | | T |
|---|---|---|---|---|---|---|---|---|---|---|
| No. 6 Harding + | 5 | – | 1 | – | 0 | 10 | – | 1 | – | 0 |
| Southern Arkansas + | 5 | – | 1 | – | 0 | 8 | – | 2 | – | 0 |
| Arkansas Tech | 4 | – | 2 | – | 0 | 5 | – | 4 | – | 1 |
| Ouachita Baptist | 3 | – | 2 | – | 1 | 6 | – | 3 | – | 1 |
| Henderson State | 2 | – | 4 | – | 0 | 4 | – | 6 | – | 0 |
| Arkansas–Monticello | 1 | – | 5 | – | 0 | 2 | – | 8 | – | 0 |
| State College of Arkansas | 0 | – | 5 | – | 1 | 2 | – | 7 | – | 1 |
+ – Conference co-champions; Rankings from NAIA Division I poll

The 1972 Harding Bisons football team represented Harding College as member of the Arkansas Intercollegiate Conference (AIC) during the 1972 NAIA Division I football season. Led by ninth-year head coach John Prock, the Bisons compiled an overall record of 10–1 with mark of 5–1 in conference play, sharing the AIC title with Southern Arkansas. Harding was invited to the Cowboy Bowl, where the Bisons defeated Langston. Harding was ranked sixth in the final NAIA Division I poll.

The 1972 team was the first in program history to win a conference championship. The AIC title was the first of two that Harding won during Prock's tenure, the other coming four years later, in 1976.

Junior star running back Alan Dixon was selected in the 14th round of the 1974 NFL draft by the Minnesota Vikings and started against the Denver Broncos in an exhibition game. He later played for the expansion Seattle Seahawks. All-American quarterback Tom Ed Gooden was selected in the 11th round of the 1974 NFL draft by the Cleveland Browns.

== Schedule ==
| Date | Time | Opponent | Site | Result | Attendance | Source |
|---|---|---|---|---|---|---|
| September 9 | | Austin* | Searcy, AR | W 58–10 | | |
| September 16 | 2:00 p.m. | at Millsaps* | Alumni Field; Jackson, MS | W 47–7 | | |
| September 23 | | at Northeast Missouri State* | Kirksville, MO | W 31–20 | | |
| September 30 | | Henderson State | Searcy, AR | W 21–10 | | |
| October 7 | | at Ouachita Baptist | Arkadelphia, AR | W 27–19 | | |
| October 14 | | Arkansas Tech | Searcy, AR | L 9–13 | | |
| October 28 | | Mississippi College* | Searcy, AR | W 48–3 | | |
| November 4 | | at Southern Arkansas | Magnolia, AR | W 14–9 | | |
| November 11 | | at Arkansas–Monticello | Monticello, AR | W 56–7 | | |
| November 18 | | State College of Arkansas | Searcy, AR | W 14–0 | | |
| December 9 | 1:30 p.m. | vs. Langston* | Cameron Stadium; Cameron, OK (Cowboy Bowl) | W 30–27 | 500 | |
*Non-conference game; All times are in Central time

== Personnel ==
=== Roster ===
- 8 Jeff Smith QB 5-11 155 Fr. 0 Calhoun, Ga.
- 10 Roger Collins QB 5-7 165 Jr. 2 Columbus, Miss.
- 11 Terry Welch QB 6-1 165 Sr. 3 McGehee, Ark.
- 12 Gary Gregg DS 5-10 170 Sr. 3 Columbiana, Ohio
- 14 Jim Akins SE 5-9 170 Sr. 2 Sacramento, Calif. 732
- 15 Rock Long DB 5-11 165 So. 1 Pascagoula, Miss.
- 17 Rodney Echols DB 5-10 191 So. 1 Forrest City, Ark.
- 18 Terry Greenwood DB 5-9 155 So. 1 Little Rock, Ark.
- 20 Tom Ed Gooden QB 6-2 180 Jr. 2 Carlisle, Ark.
- 21 Ricky Sammons FLK 5-11 182 So. 1 McGehee, Ark.
- 22 Harry Starnes FLK 5-11 172 Sr. 3 McGehee, Ark.
- 23 David Lumpkin DB 5-11 178 Sr. 3 Alma, Ark.
- 24 Steve Hinds DB 5-10 165 Sr. 3 Pacifica, Calif.
- 25 Jack Barber SE 5-9 160 So. 2 Ft. Myers, Fla.
- 26 Perry Brown SE 5-11 170 Fr. 0 Maud, Texas
- 27 James Jamison S 6-1 155 Fr. 0 Nashville, Tenn.
- 28 Alec Petway TB 5-10 180 Jr. 1 Searcy, Ark.
- 30 Sam Fitzgerald DB 5-10 178 So. 0 Searcy, Ark.
- 31 Tim Walker E 6-1 171 So. 1 Searcy, Ark.
- 32 Steve Howell FB 5-10 172 Fr. 0 Union City, Tenn.
- 33 Randy Miller LB 5-10 205 Fr. 0 Atlanta, Texas
- 34 Lanny Davenport DB 5-10 185 Fr. 0 Yellville, Ark.
- 35 Jeff Blake FB 6-0 185 So. 1 Milan, Mich.
- 37 Jerry Joslin DS 5-8 165 Fr. 0 Gallatin, Tenn.
- 40 Jackie Alston TB 5-10 180 Fr. 0 Searcy, Ark.
- 41 Russell Beene LB 5-10 190 So. 1 West Monroe, La.
- 42 Gary Hunter DS 5-9 170 Sr. 3 Searcy, Ark.
- 43 Ken Lybrand OB 5-10 170 Fr. 0 Dallas, Texas
- 44 Ted Walters FB 5-10 190 Fr. 0 Dallas, Texas
- 45 Alan Dixon TB 5-11 190 Jr. 2 Fitzgerald, Ga.
- 46 Doug Owens TB 6-3 170 Fr. 0 Holly Springs, Miss.
- 51 Mike Clem C 6-4 255 Sr. 3 Lepanto, Ark.
- 52 Robert Shock LB 5-9 185 Jr. 2 Conway, Ark.
- 53 Richard Calhoun C 6-2 194 So. 1 Little Rock, Ark.
- 54 Carlon Lemmons G 5-11 188 So. 0 Lubbock, Texas
- 55 Steve Kellar LB 5-9 160 Fr. 0 Searcy, Ark.
- 60 Jerry Chism C 5-11 200 Fr. 0 Borger, Texas
- 61 Derrell Pepper NG 5-9 158 Fr. 0 Birmingham, Ala.
- 62 Rick Brown G 6-0 190 Sr. 3 Ocilla, Ga.
- 63 David Williams G 5-9 180 Sr. 3 North Little Rock, Ark.
- 64 Milton Hopkins LB 5-10 200 So. 1 Fitzgerald, Ga.
- 65 Clarence Hicks NG 5-7 210 Jr. 2 Forrest City, Ark.
- 66 Steve Sparks G 5-7 180 Fr. 0 Calhoun, Ga.
- 68 Kenneth Neller G 5-10 185 Fr. 0 Huntsville, Ala.
- 70 David Cooke DT 5-11 195 Fr. 0 Houston, Texas
- 71 Barney Crawford T 6-5 230 So. 1 Mountain Home, Ark.
- 72 Bob Mason T 6-1 200 So. 1 Fort Smith, Ark.
- 73 John Cooley G 6-5 195 Fr. 0 Memphis, Tenn.
- 74 Neil Thompson T 6-1 217 Jr. 2 Tucker, Ga.
- 75 Steve Watts T 6-0 248 So. 1 Atlanta, Ga.
- 76 Dwight Willett DT 6-1 210 Fr. 0 Saskatchewan, Canada
- 77 Edd Eason T 6-4 225 Sr. 3 Fort Worth, Texas
- 78 Tony Felker DT 6-3 220 Sr. 3 Memphis, Tenn.
- 80 James Pigg DE 6-2 190 Jr. 2 New Concord, Ky.
- 81 Ken Lawyer FLK 5-11 175 Jr. 0 Lamar, Ark.
- 83 Adrian Hickmon DE 6-4 200 Fr. 0 Searcy, Ark.
- 84 Barry Buckley DE 6-3 185 So. 1 Martin, Tenn.
- 85 Larry Richmond DE 5-11 180 Jr. 2 West Memphis, Ark.
- 86 Rance Reagan G 6-1 195 Jr. 2 Memphis, Tenn.
- 87 Dale Payne DT 5-10 208 Sr. 3 Newport, Ark.
- 88 Steve Clary TE 6-2 208 Jr. 2 Carbondale, Ill.
- 89 Lynn Chaffin TE 6-2 185 Fr. 0 North Little Rock, Ark.

=== Coaching staff ===
- Head coach: John Prock
- Assistant coach: Dick Johnson
- Assistant coach: Jerry Mote
- Assistant coach: Cliff Sharp
