= Ronnie Peacock =

American football player and coach (born 1950)

Biographical details
- Born: September 5, 1950 (age 76)

Playing career
- 1968–1971: Harding
- 1972: Pittsburgh Steelers*
- Position: Wide receiver

Coaching career (HC unless noted)
- 1979–1987: Harding (DC)
- 1988–1990: Arkansas Tech (DC)
- 1991–1992: Abilene Christian
- 1995–2000: Greenwood HS (AR)
- 2001–2009: Rogers HS (AR)

Head coaching record
- Overall: 4–15 (college); 103–75–1 (high school)

Ronnie Peacock (born September 5, 1950) is an American former football coach. As a college player at Harding University, Peacock became the 8th player in college football history to catch 200 passes in a career. He was the 14th head football coach for the Abilene Christian University in Abilene, Texas, serving for two seasons, from 1991 to 1992, and compiling a record of 4–15.

== Head coaching record ==
=== College ===
Year	Team	Overall	Conference	Standing	Bowl/playoffs
Abilene Christian Wildcats (Lone Star Conference) (1991–1992)
1991	Abilene Christian	1–9	1–5	T–5th	
1992	Abilene Christian	3–6	2–4	T–5th	
Abilene Christian:		4–15	3–9		
Total:		4–15			

=== High school ===
Year	Team	Overall	Conference	Standing	Bowl/playoffs
Greenwood Bulldogs () (1994–2000)
1994	Greenwood	6–5	5–2		
1995	Greenwood	7–3	4–3		
1996	Greenwood	12–2	6–0	1st	
1997	Greenwood	7–4	4–1	1st	
1998	Greenwood	11–2	6–1	1st	
1999	Greenwood	7–6	4–3		
2000	Greenwood	13–1	7–0	1st	
Greenwood:		63–23	36–10		
Rogers Mountaineers () (2001–2009)
2001	Rogers	2–8	0–7		
2002	Rogers	1–9	0–7		
2003	Rogers	6–4	3–4		
2004	Rogers	4–6	2–5	7th	
2005	Rogers	4–5–1	3–4	6th	
2006	Rogers	12–1	7–0	1st	
2007	Rogers	6–4	4–3	4th	
2008	Rogers	3–7	1–5	6th	
2009	Rogers	2–8	0–7	8th	
Rogers:		40–52–1	20–42		
Total:		103–75–1			
National championship Conference title Conference division title or championship game berth
