= 1953 All-Big Seven Conference football team =

The 1953 All-Big Seven Conference football team consists of American football players chosen by various organizations for All-Big Seven Conference teams for the 1953 college football season. The selectors for the 1953 season included the Associated Press (AP) and the United Press (UP). Players selected as first-team honorees by both the AP and UP are displayed in bold.

== All-Big Seven selections ==
=== Backs ===
- **John Bordogna**, Nebraska (AP-1; UP-1)
- **Veryl Switzer**, Kansas State (AP-1; UP-1)
- **Larry Grigg**, Oklahoma (AP-1; UP-1)
- Bob Bauman, Missouri (AP-1)
- Max Burkett, Iowa State (AP-2; UP-1 [FB])
- Gene Calame, Oklahoma (AP-2)
- Frank Bernardi, Colorado (AP-2)
- Ed Merrifield, Missouri (AP-2)
- Bob Dahnke, Kansas State (AP-3)
- Bob Schoonmaker, Missouri (AP-3)
- Carroll Hardy, Colorado (AP-3)
- Robert Burris, Oklahoma (AP-3)

=== Ends ===
- **Gary Knafelc**, Colorado (AP-1; UP-1)
- Ed Pence, Kansas State (AP-1)
- Max Boydston, Oklahoma (AP-2; UP-1)
- Carl Allison, Oklahoma (AP-2)
- Morris Kay, Kansas (AP-3)
- John Wilson, Missouri (AP-3)

=== Tackles ===
- **Roger Nelson**, Oklahoma (AP-1; UP-1)
- Ted Connor, Nebraska (AP-1)
- Jerry Minnick, Nebraska (UP-1)
- Joe Lundy, Kansas (AP-2)
- Jack Lessin, Iowa State (AP-2)
- Ron Marciniak, Kansas State (AP-3)
- Don Brown, Oklahoma (AP-3)

=== Guards ===
- **J. D. Roberts**, Oklahoma (AP-1; UP-1)
- Terry Roberts, Missouri (AP-1)
- Tommy O'Boyle, Kansas State (AP-2; UP-1)
- Dick Knowlton, Colorado (AP-2)
- Bo Bolinger, Oklahoma (AP-3)
- Bob Hantla, Kansas (AP-3)

=== Centers ===
- **Kurt Burris**, Oklahoma (AP-1; UP-1)
- Ken Gowdy, Kansas State (AP-2)
- Bob Oberlin, Nebraska (AP-3)

== Key ==
AP = Associated Press

UP = United Press

== See also ==
- 1953 College Football All-America Team
