= W. T. Henry =

American football coach

Coaching career (HC unless noted)
- 1927: Harding

Head coaching record
- Overall: 0–8–1

W. T. Henry was an American football coach, and the fourth head coach of Harding College, in 1927. The season was a disastrous 0-8-1.

The season began with only three of the previous year's players showing up for practice. One of those was fourth-year player Clyde "Doc" Matthews, who was the "player/coach" from the year before. The other two veterans to show up were "Tate" Mills and "Swede" Patton. The Harding yearbook The Petit Jean wrote:

"The new material was below the standard it has been in other years, and Coach Henry faced the problem of building a team to meet a heavy schedule from his three veterans, and a bunch of light, green, rookies."

The team gave up 259 points on the year and only scored 6 points. The editors of The Petit Jean hinted at attitude problems on the team:

"Green material is liable to let down a little after several hard games and over-confidence is sure to lose. These things were factors causing a crushing defeat by the Beebe Aggies (0-87). Following the Beebe game the morale of the new men was practically ruined..."

The Petit Jean editors found some kinder words for Coach Henry's veterans and hope for the future:

"Despite the disastrous season, the Herd had some men good enough for any team in the state. Mills, at tackle, played a splendid game in every contest, and his presence in the line kept the new men "pepped up." Captain Patton divided his duties between defensive center and offensive quarter back. His defensive play was good. Matthews, an end, who has seen four campaigns, played good football every game. Among the new men, Arnold, Ruby, Rhodes and Mattox showed well in their first season of college football.

"The students of Harding and the people of Morrilton are anxious for a good football team next fall. Bison football squads, in the past, have always been composed of new men every year.

"The first step in building a football team is to get as many veterans to return as possible. With an average amount of new material and eight or ten old men, the Bisons can have a winner (next year)."
