= African Americans in Kansas =

Ethnic group in Kansas

Total population
- 178,725 (2019)

Regions with significant populations
- Wichita

Languages
- Midland American English, African-American Vernacular English, African languages

Religion
- Black Protestant

Related ethnic groups
- African Americans

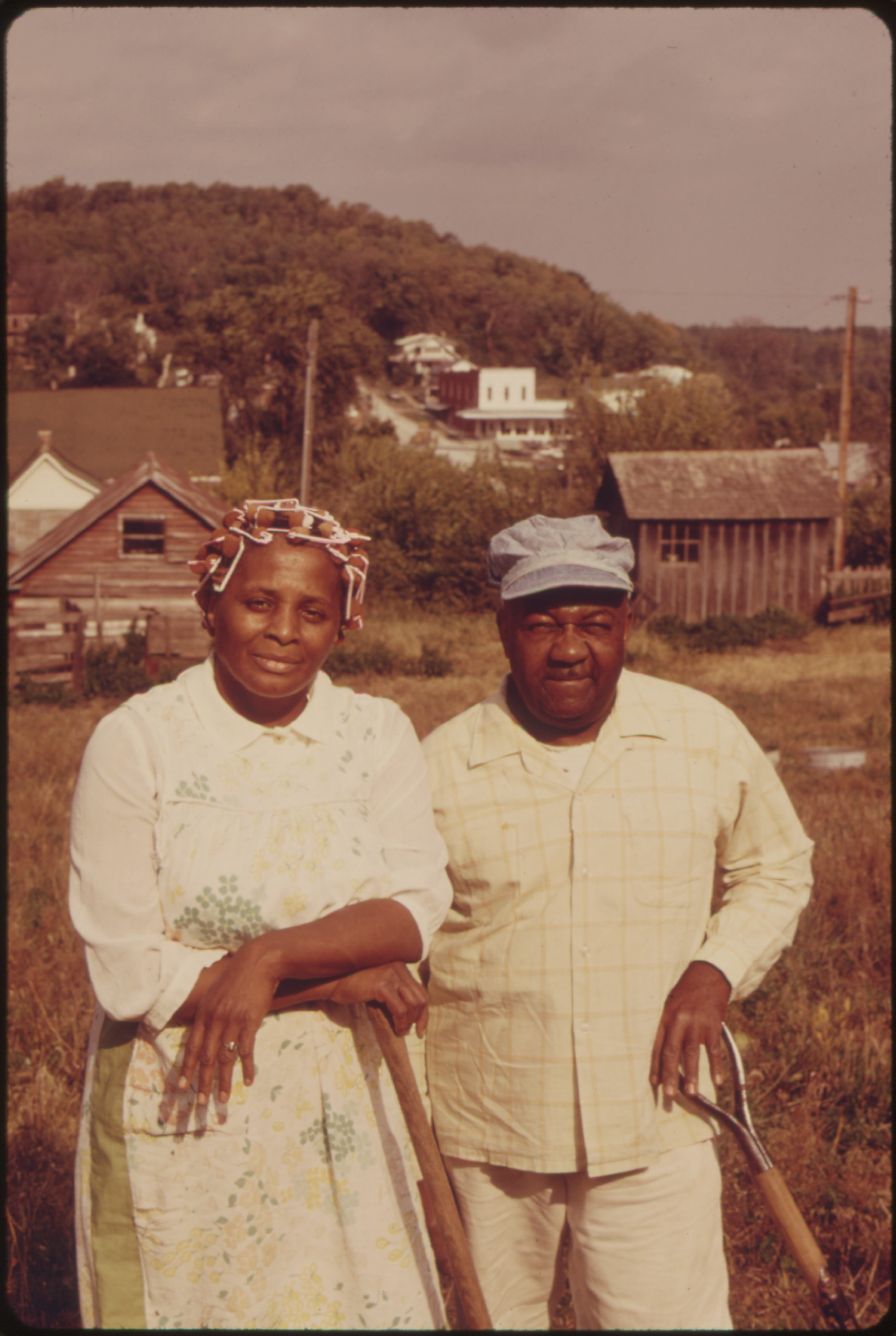
African Americans in Kansas

There is an African-American community in Kansas, including in Kansas City, Kansas. Nicodemus, Kansas is the oldest surviving town west of the Mississippi River settled solely by African Americans.

Brown v. Board of Education of Topeka was decided in 1954.

As of the 2020 U.S. Census, African Americans were 5.7% of the state's population. They are concentrated in Wyandotte County and Geary County.

== History ==
Kansas was admitted to the United States as a free state in 1861. Some Black slaves were imported to Kansas. Many Black migrants came from the Southern United States as hired laborers while others traveled to Kansas as escaped slaves via the Underground Railroad. Some moved from the South during the Kansas Exodus in the 1860s. Kansas was not immune from Jim Crow segregation, race riots, white supremacy and violence from racist white people. Newspapers have documented incidents of white people lynching a black man in Fort Scott and white mobs attacking black Americans held in jails in Leavenworth, Topeka, and Kansas City.

In 1954, Brown v. Board of Education of Topeka was decided and desegregated schools nationwide.

== Population and geography ==
Nicodemus, Kansas was settled by African Americans in the 1870s, commemorated in the Nicodemus National Historic Site. Nicodemus is the oldest remaining town settled entirely by African Americans located west of the Mississippi River. Most of the town's founders were formerly enslaved. Most Black people in Kansas originally lived in the Eastern portions of the state because the Underground Railroad had stops there. Kansas City also has a significant Black population.

In the 2020 Census, 168,809 Kansas residents were identified as African American (of the total 2,937,880). In two of the state's 105 counties, African Americans make up more than 10% of the population: Wyandotte (20.4%) and Geary (17.2%). African Americans in the seven counties of Sedgwick (46,531), Wyandotte (34,589), Johnson (28,781), Shawnee (14,211), Leavenworth (6,858), Geary (6,303), and Douglas (5,301) make up more than 84% of all African Americans in the state.

== Media ==
The Call is headquartered in Kansas City, Missouri and also is distributed to African-Americans in Kansas City, Kansas.

== Politics ==
In 1888, Republican Alfred Fairfax was elected to the Kansas House of Representatives, becoming the first African American in the state legislature. Today, the Kansas African American Legislative Caucus exists to represent Black members of the Kansas Legislature.

In 2011, Carl Brewer became the first elected Black mayor of Wichita, the state's largest city.

== Education ==
Sumner High School was a racially segregated high school in Kansas City, Kansas. The Interstate Literary Association was established in Topeka in 1892. It was a multi-state education organization for African Americans.

== Notable people ==
- Janelle Monáe, a singer and actress
- Bobby Lashley
- Gordon Parks
- George Washington Carver
- Langston Hughes
- Hattie McDaniel
- Gale Sayers
- Barry Sanders
- Elwood "Bingo" DeMoss
- Charles "Bird" Parker
- Coleman Hawkins
- Eva Jessye

== See also ==
- History of Kansas
- Demographics of Kansas
- History of slavery in Kansas
- List of African-American newspapers in Kansas
