= Roy Bell (Canadian football) =

American gridiron football player (born 1949)

No. 14
- Position: Running back

Personal information
- Born: July 29, 1949 (age 77); Clinton, Oklahoma, U.S.
- Listed height: 6 ft 0 in (1.83 m)
- Listed weight: 208 lb (94 kg)

Career information
- High school: Clinton
- College: Oklahoma (1968–1971)
- NFL draft: 1972: 9th round, 234th overall pick

Career history
- Edmonton Eskimos (1972–1976)

Awards and highlights
- Grey Cup champion (1975); Eddie James Memorial Trophy (1973); 2× CFL All-Star (1973, 1974); 2× CFL West All-Star (1973, 1974); CFL rushing yards leader (1973)

Career CFL statistics
- Rushing yards: 4,667
- Rushing average: 4.9
- Rushing touchdowns: 18
- Receptions: 107
- Receiving yards: 1,049
- Receiving touchdowns: 3

Roy Bell (born July 29, 1949) is an American former professional football running back who played in the Canadian Football League (CFL) for the Edmonton Eskimos. He played college football for the Oklahoma Sooners.

== Early life ==
Belle attended Clinton High School, where he played as a running back. In 1965, along with his brother Carlos, he helped the school win its first football state championship.

In 1967, he was a part of an undefeated team that won the football state championship and that one national publication called the best high school team in the country that season. He finished with more than 6,000 rushing yards, leading the state in his last 2 years in rusing and scoring. He only lost one game during his three-year varsity career (13-19 against Wewoka in the 1966 state finals).

== College career ==
Bell accepted a football scholarship from the University of Oklahoma. In 1970, he became part of the school's first wishbone backfield along with Jack Mildren, Greg Pruitt and Leon Crosswhite.

As a senior, he recorded 87 carries for 625 yards (fourth on the team) and 9 touchdowns (third on the team). He finished his college career with 50 carries for 1,421 yards, 13 rushing touchdowns, 16 receptions for 225 receiving yards and one receiving touchdown.

== Professional career ==
Bell was selected by the Dallas Cowboys in the ninth round (234th overall) of the 1972 NFL draft. He opted not sign with the team.

On May 12, 1972, he signed with the Edmonton Eskimos of the Canadian Football League. As a rookie, he posted 690 yards and 2 touchdowns in 10 games.

The next year, he led the West division with 1,455 rushing yards and was named an All-Canadian. In 1974, he had 286 carries for 1,341 yards and 4 touchdowns.

In 1975, he tallied 232 carries for 1,006 yards and was a part of the Grey Cup winning team. The next year, he only played in 6 games, collecting 50 carries for 175 yards and 2 touchdowns. In 1977, he was replaced with Jim Germany.

Bell finished his career with 962 carries, 4,667 rushing yards, 18 rushing touchdowns, 107 receptions, 1,049 receiving yards, 3 receiving touchdowns and was a two-time CFL All-Star.
