= Nicodemus, Kansas =

Unincorporated community in Graham County, Kansas

- Unincorporated community and CDP
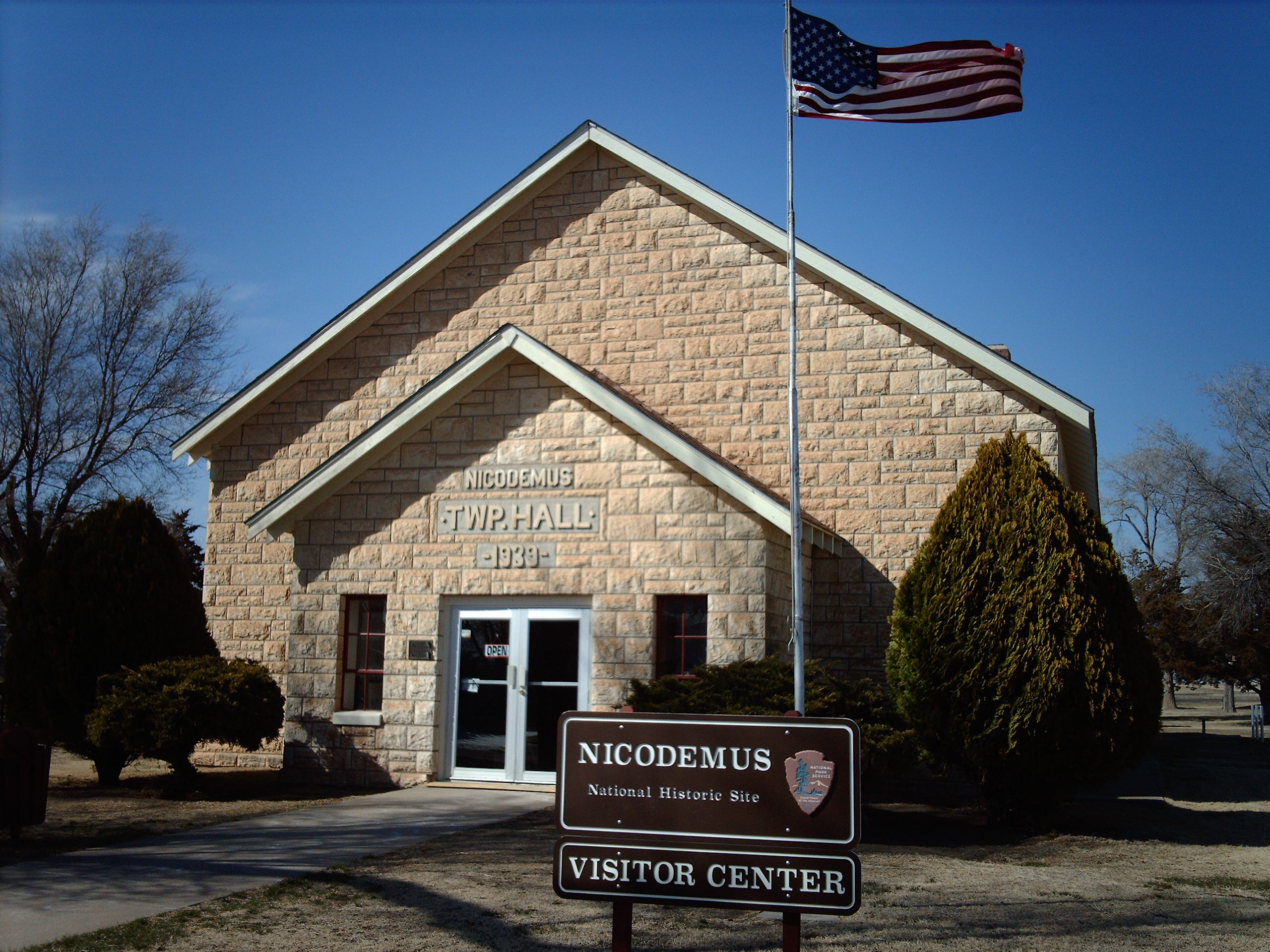
- Nicodemus Township Hall (2006)

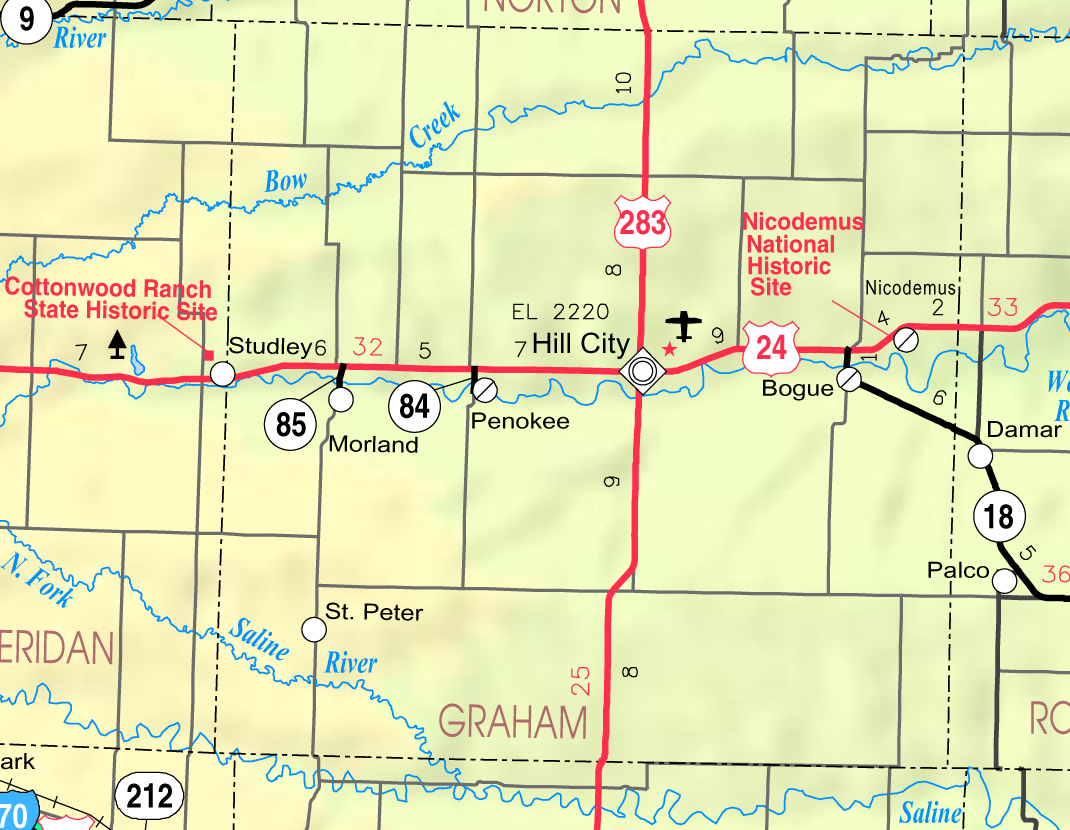
- KDOT map of Graham County (legend)

- Location within Kansas Location within the United States
- Coordinates: 39°23′40″N 99°37′1″W
- Country: United States
- State: Kansas
- County: Graham
- Founded: 1877
- Named for: Nicodemus
- Elevation: 2,018 ft (615 m)

Population (2020)
  - Total: 14
- Time zone: UTC-6 (CST)
  - Summer (DST): UTC-5 (CDT)
- Area code: 785
- FIPS code: 20-50550
- GNIS ID: 472219

Nicodemus is an unincorporated community and census-designated place (CDP) in Graham County, Kansas, United States. As of the 2020 census, the population was 14. The community was founded in 1877 and is named for the Biblical figure Nicodemus. The Nicodemus National Historic Site, commemorating the only remaining western town established by African Americans during the Reconstruction period following the Civil War, is in town. During the last weekend of July, former residents and their descendants return for celebrations and parades.

== History ==
=== Background ===
The settlement of Nicodemus was part of a greater movement of westward migration that occurred in the latter half of the 19th century. Several technological and cultural factors contributed to the growing trend of movement, enabling and encouraging new groups to move west. The Homestead Act of 1862 provided settlement opportunities for people of modest means. A person could claim a 160-acre plot provided they lived on and develop the land for a five-year period, after which it could be purchased. In addition, the expansion of the railroad network across the Great Plains increased both the accessibility and economic opportunity of developing settlements.

Kansas also had an appeal to African Americans living in the post-Civil War South. Kansas represented a land of freedom and opportunity due to the actions of John Brown and other abolitionists. Promoters such as Benjamin "Pap" Singleton encouraged African Americans to move to Kansas. Nicodemus would become a destination for these new migrants. Railroads and steamboats offered cheap passage for these early settlers. Eager to escape the persecution and poor living conditions of Reconstruction, thousands left the South and headed west seeking economic opportunity and a sense of freedom.

=== 1877: Foundation ===
On April 18, 1877, a group of seven Kansans, six of whom were black, established the Nicodemus Town Company. African American W. H. Smith and W. R. Hill, an experienced white land speculator, served as the town's first president and treasurer, respectively. Most of the group consisted of former slaves from Kentucky in search of a new livelihood. The goal was to establish the first all-black settlement on the Great Plains. Two theories explain the choice of the name Nicodemus, one claiming the town was named after the biblical figure Nicodemus, the other holding that the town's name was inspired by the legendary account of an African prince taken into slavery who later purchased his freedom. The location of the town, chosen by Hill, was along the northern bank of the Solomon River, an area suitable for developing farming. The town itself was located on a 160-acre plot, of the 19,200 acres of the township, at large.

Smith and Hill made efforts to promote the town and attract new settlers. Publications describing the resources and benefits of moving to the area were mailed to prospective migrants across the South. Early promotional efforts were directed towards attracting people with enough money to develop the town. Residential lots cost $5 while commercial lots were $75. The promoters charged additional fees for establishing the settlers on the land. Efforts succeeded in bringing groups of colonists from Eastern Kansas and Kentucky, at one point the population reached about 600 people in 1878.

In 1878, John Wayne Niles served as the second president of the colony. The early settlers found life in Nicodemus to be challenging. Some people turned around after seeing the scarcity of resources by mid-1878. Most were very poor farmers who came without money and other provisions. Without proper tools and equipment, such as plows, wagons, and horses, farmers could not efficiently develop the rough land; some resorted to using hand tools to make improvised fields. A lack of timber forced settlers to build homes out of prairie sod. To earn money some people collected and sold Buffalo bones found on the plains; others ventured miles away to work for the railroads. In response to the hardships, townsfolk reached out to other communities, private charities, and even the Native American Osage tribe.

=== 1879–1880: Growth ===
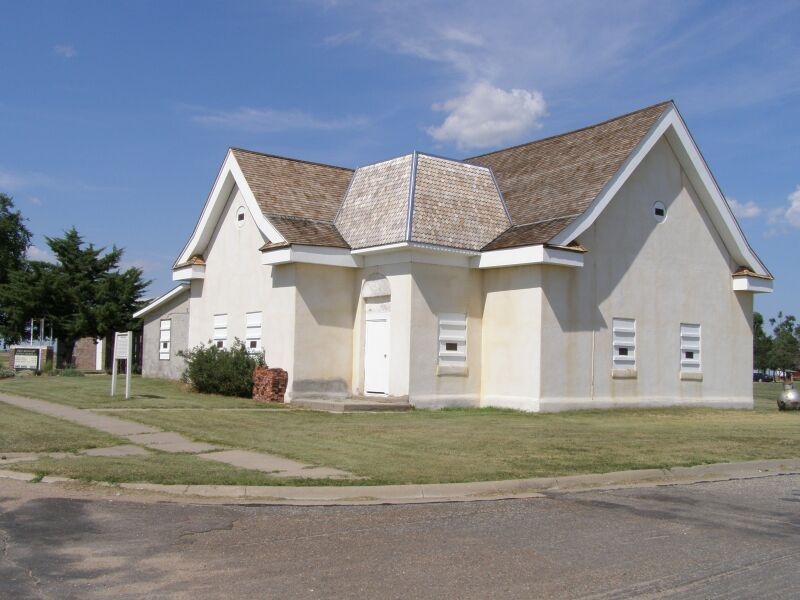
NICO First Baptist Church

New groups of settlers arrived in Nicodemus in 1878–79 from Kentucky and Mississippi. Unlike the early migrants, they had the resources necessary to develop and cultivate the farmland; they came with the horse teams, plows, other farm equipment, and money that the early settlers did not have. John W. Niles, a leader in the charity movement, replaced Smith as the president of the town company. Under Niles' leadership, a decision was made to stop seeking charity in order to encourage the ideas of industry and self-sufficiency. Additionally, the town did not want to become a destination of the Exodusters, a migration of thousands of poor black farmers into Kansas. They feared that a mass influx of poor farmers would be harmful to the community.

Soon the town began to grow and businesses became profitable; a hotel and two stores were established and a school and three churches were built. Social organizations such as the Grand Independent Benevolent Society of Kansans and Missouri put on dances and other celebrations for the benefit of the town. One such event was the annual celebration of England's emancipation of slavery in the West Indies. In 1880, the election to determine the Graham County seat was held in Nicodemus, in which the town was defeated in favor of Millbrook.

=== 1880–1888: Decline ===
After the growth of 1879–80, Nicodemus experienced a period of decline after 1880. Most people who settled in the town did not intend to remain there permanently and subsequently moved on. Not enough of the $75 commercial lots were sold to keep the town growing. Years of poor harvests also contributed to declining population. In 1884, less than 50 people remained in the town. Another challenge Nicodemus faced was a legal battle over the ownership of its land. Henry Miller, a local land speculator, discovered that errors in the filing record meant that the town had not received final ownership of the land. Miller's suit threatened the claims of the residents, but ultimately the case was dropped and the town received its official title on June 6, 1886.

Beginning in 1886 the town began another campaign of promotion. The town's two newspapers: the Western Cyclone and the Nicodemus Enterprise were central to the new campaign. The papers sought to broaden the appeal of Nicodemus by reaching out to other populations, both black and white. Descriptions of the towns numerous social clubs, activities, celebrations, and business opportunities were spread in the hope of attracting new migrants. The town undertook a major effort to bring a railroad route through Nicodemus, passing a vote to sell $16,000 of bonds to finance the projects. Ultimately, none of the three prospective railroad companies (the Missouri Pacific, Union Pacific, and Santa Fe) brought their tracks to the town.

=== 1888–present ===
The failed attempt to attract the railroad marked the end of growth for Nicodemus and most of the businesses in town relocated elsewhere. Despite the loss of business, the town remained a social center for the local community. Organizations such as the Masons, the American Legion, and the Priscilla Art Club continued to host dances, celebrations, and other events. The annual emancipation celebration continued to be a focal point of town life. In the 1920s, thousands attended the event which consisted of horse races, boxing matches, parades, and baseball games.

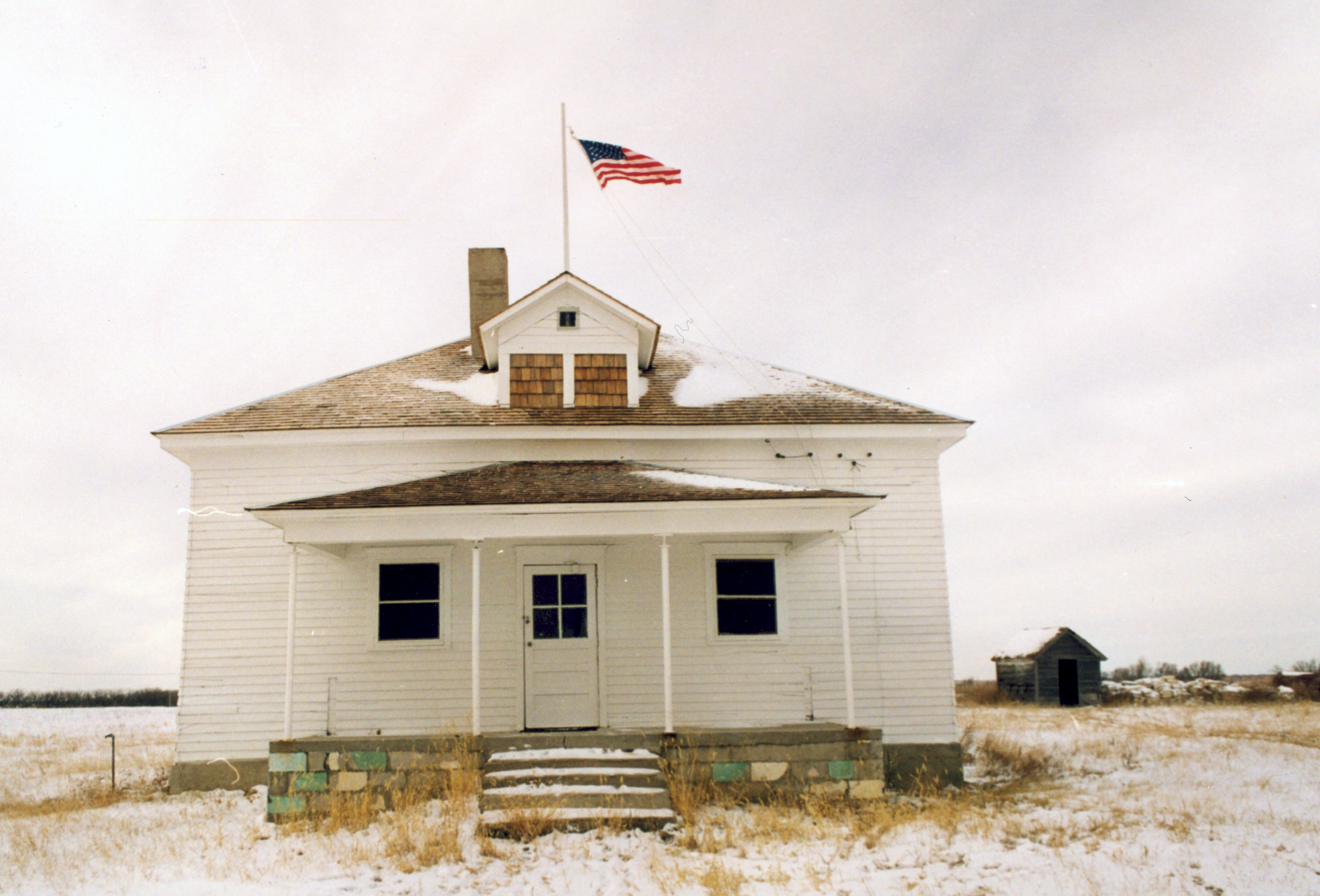
Nicodemus National Historic Site NICODE-1

The Great Depression and the Dust Bowl each had a serious impact on Nicodemus; the population of the town fell to as low as 40 people. The town did receive aid from the Federal Land Bank and Graham County Farm Bureau. Because of the Depression, many families lost their land and subsequently became tenant farmers. Additionally, the rough conditions of the Depression forced many farmers to change their farming methods, leading many to select more hardy and drought-resistant crops. The declining population led to the closure of the post office in 1953 and the school around 1960. Because of a lack of attendance, the social organizations also closed down.

Starting in the 1970s Nicodemus underwent a process of revitalization and restoration. Donations from former residents led to efforts to repair damage to the deteriorating town buildings. New improvements were made to the town including low-income housing units, construction of a 100-foot tall water tower, and the pavement of the major town streets. These efforts succeeded in preserving Nicodemus and rebuilding its popularity. The town developed a new identity as a retirement destination for former residents. The Emancipation celebration, renamed Homecoming, changed to become a gathering of old residents to celebrate their roots and common history and continues to be celebrated annually.

In 1976, Nicodemus was named a National Historic Landmark. As of 2018, its First Baptist Church, African Methodist Episcopal Church, and other historic buildings were in such poor shape that they could not be opened to the public. The AME Church was successfully renovated and opened to visitors in 2021. At that point, Nicodemus was down to 23 residents.

== Geography ==
According to the United States Census Bureau, the Nicodemus township has an area of 32.4 square miles. The town is located along Highway 24 in the Great Plains.

=== Climate ===
Nicodemus's location on the Great Plains entails a four-season climate. Summer is typically long and hot, during which thunderstorms are a common occurrence. Spring and fall are usually brief, while winter is cold. The average annual precipitation is about 22 inches.

Climate data for Nicodemus, Kansas
Month	Jan	Feb	Mar	Apr	May	Jun	Jul	Aug	Sep	Oct	Nov	Dec	Year
Mean daily maximum °F (°C)	43 (6)	47 (8)	56 (13)	67 (19)	75 (24)	86 (30)	93 (34)	90 (32)	82 (28)	69 (21)	55 (13)	43 (6)	67 (20)
Mean daily minimum °F (°C)	15 (−9)	18 (−8)	26 (−3)	36 (2)	48 (9)	58 (14)	64 (18)	62 (17)	51 (11)	38 (3)	26 (−3)	16 (−9)	38 (4)
Source: National Park Service "Climate". National Park Service. Archived from the original on January 7, 2014.

== Demographics ==
Historical population
Census	Pop.	Note	%±
2020	14		—
U.S. Decennial Census

Nicodemus CDP, Kansas – Racial and ethnic composition Note: the US Census treats Hispanic/Latino as an ethnic category. This table excludes Latinos from the racial categories and assigns them to a separate category. Hispanics/Latinos may be of any race.
Race / Ethnicity (NH = Non-Hispanic)	Pop 2020	2020
White alone (NH)	1	7.14%
Black or African American alone (NH)	10	71.43%
Native American or Alaska Native alone (NH)	0	0.00%
Asian alone (NH)	0	0.00%
Native Hawaiian or Pacific Islander alone (NH)	0	0.00%
Other race alone (NH)	0	0.00%
Mixed race or Multiracial (NH)	1	7.14%
Hispanic or Latino (any race)	2	14.29%
Total	14	100.00%

=== 2020 census ===
The 2020 United States census counted 14 people, 5 households, and 0 families in Nicodemus. The population density was 15.9 per square mile (6.1/km^{2}). There were 32 housing units at an average density of 36.4 per square mile (14.0/km^{2}). The racial makeup was 78.57% (11) Black or African-American, 14.29% (2) white or European American (7.14% non-Hispanic white), 0.0% (0) Native American or Alaska Native, 0.0% (0) Asian, 0.0% (0) Pacific Islander or Native Hawaiian, 0.0% (0) from other races, and 7.14% (1) from two or more races. Hispanic or Latino of any race was 14.29% (2) of the population.

Of the 5 households, 0.0% had children under the age of 18; 0.0% were married couples living together; 0.0% had a female householder with no spouse or partner present. 100.0% of households consisted of individuals and 20.0% had someone living alone who was 65 years of age or older. The percent of those with a bachelor's degree or higher was estimated to be 0.0% of the population.

7.1% of the population was under the age of 18, 7.1% from 18 to 24, 7.1% from 25 to 44, 42.9% from 45 to 64, and 35.7% who were 65 years of age or older. The median age was 59.5 years. For every 100 females, there were 75.0 males. For every 100 females ages 18 and older, there were 85.7 males.

== Recreation ==
The National Historic Site is a major tourist attraction in Nicodemus. The Visitor Center includes a bookstore and exhibits of the town's history. Walking and guided tours are available which showcase the historic buildings and features of the town. The Nicodemus Historical Society and Museum operated by descendants offer personal and group history and educational tours to cemeteries, homesteads, and school sites out in the historic township. There is also a roadside park located in the town which includes a playground and a picnic area.

== Education ==
The community is served by Graham County USD 281 public school district.

== Notable people ==
- Dale Alexander (born 1949), American sprinter
- Lulu Craig (1867-1971), historian and author of unpublished manuscript focusing on the history of Black and Native peoples in Nicodemus
- Edward McCabe (1850–1920), town secretary, later Kansas State auditor
- John Wayne Niles (1842–?), early settler of Nicodemus and the founder of the all-Black Indemnity Party he advocated for slavery reparations in the early 1880s.
- Veryl Switzer (1932–2022), football player for Green Bay Packers for two seasons and in the CFL for three; born in Nicodemus

== See also ==
- Nicodemus National Historic Site, containing a history of the town
- Pearl Cleage's play Flying West takes place in Nicodemus in the late nineteenth century.
- History of African Americans in Kansas
- Black homesteaders
- List of U.S. communities with African-American majority populations in 2020
