= Tank Daniels =

American football player (born 1981)

No. 50, 52, 56, 57
- Position: Linebacker

Personal information
- Born: December 27, 1981 (age 44); Clarendon, Arkansas, U.S.
- Listed height: 6 ft 4 in (1.93 m)
- Listed weight: 252 lb (114 kg)

Career information
- College: Harding
- NFL draft: 2006: undrafted

Career history
- Philadelphia Eagles (2006); New York Giants (2007); Philadelphia Eagles (2008); Jacksonville Jaguars (2009); Hartford Colonials (2010)

Awards and highlights
- Super Bowl champion (XLII); 2× Division II All-American (2004–2005); Little All-American (2005)

Career NFL statistics
- Total tackles: 20
- Stats at Pro Football Reference

Torrance "Tank" Daniels (born December 27, 1981) is an American former professional football player who was a linebacker in the National Football League (NFL). He was signed by the Philadelphia Eagles as an undrafted free agent in 2006.

Daniels has also played for the New York Giants, Jacksonville Jaguars, and Hartford Colonials. He earned a Super Bowl ring with the Giants in XLII against the New England Patriots. After his playing career, he became a football coach at Don Bosco Prep in Ramsey, New Jersey.

== Early life ==
Daniels was an All-State performer in football as a quarterback during his sophomore and junior seasons and as a wide receiver as a senior. He earned All-State honors in baseball as a shortstop, in basketball as a power forward, and in track competing in the hurdles, sprint relays, and long jump.

== College career ==
He was a two-time All-American honoree, compiled 237 tackles, 34.0 TFL, 17.5 sacks, and 7 interceptions in his career at Harding University. He earned Associated Press Little All-America honors as a senior. As a freshman, Daniels had 30 tackles, 4.5 for loss, 2.5 sacks, and an interception. He had his best overall season as a sophomore, finishing with 69 tackles, 13.5 for loss, seven sacks, two picks, and four forced fumbles. Daniels continued his standout play in 2004, posting 64 tackles, six for a loss and 3.5 sacks and a career high four interceptions on the season. He concluded his career with a career high 74 tackles, 10 for loss, 4.5 sacks, and four forced fumbles. The four-year starter was twice named All-American, forced 10 fumbles during his career, and averaged 26 yards per interception return.

== Professional career ==
=== First stint with Philadelphia Eagles ===
After being undrafted in the 2006 NFL draft, Daniels signed with the Philadelphia Eagles where he was on the practice squad. The Eagles signed Daniels from their practice squad after placing quarterback Donovan McNabb on the injured reserve list. He made his NFL debut on November 26, 2006, with the Eagles against the Indianapolis Colts, almost forcing a fumble on his first play with a tackle. He ended up playing in 6 total games during the 2006 season and registered 5 total tackles. He was waived by the Eagles at the beginning of the 2007 season.

=== New York Giants ===
Daniels was signed to the New York Giants practice squad after being cut by the Eagles. He was waived by the Giants at the beginning of the 2008 season. In a playoff game against the Tampa Bay Buccaneers, Daniels forced a fumble.

=== Second stint with Philadelphia Eagles ===
During the 2008 season, Daniels re-signed with the Philadelphia Eagles. In his second stint in Philadelphia, Daniels notched 18 special teams tackles in 2008. He was waived during final cuts on September 5, 2009.

=== Jacksonville Jaguars ===
Daniels was signed by the Jacksonville Jaguars on December 21, 2009, after linebacker Clint Ingram was placed on injured reserve. Daniels was injured and subsequently placed on the injured reserve list on April 26, 2010.
