= Kurt Adams (Canadian football) =

American gridiron football player (born 1987)

Profile
- Position: Wide receiver

Personal information
- Born: July 10, 1987 (age 39); Searcy, Arkansas
- Listed height: 6 ft 4 in (1.93 m)
- Listed weight: 197 lb (89 kg)

Career information
- High school: Harding Academy
- College: Harding

Career history
- 2011–2012: Winnipeg Blue Bombers

Kurt Adams (born July 10, 1987) is a Canadian football wide receiver who played for the Winnipeg Blue Bombers of the Canadian Football League. After being on the practice squad of the Blue Bombers in 2011, Adams was moved to the active roster in 2012 and played in two regular season games. He caught three passes for 19 yards.
