= Frank Bernardi =

American football player (born 1933)

No. 49, 43
- Positions: Defensive back, halfback

Personal information
- Born: June 17, 1933 (age 93); Highwood, Illinois, U.S.
- Listed height: 5 ft 9 in (1.75 m)
- Listed weight: 181 lb (82 kg)

Career information
- High school: Chicago (IL) Austin Community Academy
- College: Colorado
- NFL draft: 1955: 4th round, 38th overall pick

Career history
- Chicago Cardinals (1955–1957); Denver Broncos (1960)

Awards and highlights
- Second-team All-American (1954); First-team All-Big Seven (1954); Second-team All-Big Seven (1953)

Career NFL/AFL statistics
- Interceptions: 4
- Fumble recoveries: 3
- Rushing yards: 25
- Rushing average: 1.1
- Receptions: 9
- Receiving yards: 146
- Total touchdowns: 2
- Stats at Pro Football Reference

Frank Dominic Bernardi (born June 17, 1933) is an American former professional football player who was a defensive back in the National Football League (NFL) and the American Football League (AFL). He played college football for the Colorado Buffaloes. A fourth round selection (38th overall pick) in the 1955 NFL draft, Bernardi played for the NFL's Chicago Cardinals, from 1955 through 1957, and for the AFL's Denver Broncos in 1960. Bernardi remains active in the Alumni club, and has been a member since 1962.

== College career ==
Frank Bernardi attended the university of Colorado, where he was a two-sport athlete. He played for the Buffaloes baseball team as an outfielder, leading the team in home runs with six, and RBI's with 26 during his senior season. On the Buffaloes football team he was an all-purpose back. He ran the ball, and played quarterback when needed as well. And when called upon, he also returned kicks as well. In a game against arch rival Colorado State, Bernardi ran for 152 yards and scored two touchdowns on only five carries. Colorado won the game, 46-0.

== Professional football career ==
In the 1955 NFL draft, the Chicago Cardinals selected Bernadi in the fourth round, making him the 38th overall player selected in the draft. Bernadi made the team, despite it being well stocked at running back with Johnny Olszewski and future hall of famer Ollie Matson. Bernardi was used as both a runner and receiver in his rookie season by Cardinals head coach Ray Richards. Bernardi had eight carries for seventeen yards as a halfback spelling Matson. Bernardi was also deployed as receiver with four receptions for 77 yards and a score. His lone touchdown reception coming in an 24-24 tie against the Philadelphia Eagles week five. The 39 yard pass from Cardinals quarterback Lamar McHan was the first score in the game.

Bernardi played sparingly in the 1956 and 1957 seasons, and the end of the 1957, Bernardi was released by Chicago. He spent 1958 and 1959 out of football, but the foundation of the American Football League gave him another chance. He signed with the Denver Broncos, and spent his lone season in the AFL as a role player. With Lionel Taylor entrenched as the starter, not much playing time was available for Bernardi. At the conclusion of the season, Bernardi, suffering from an injured knee, drew his release and quietly retired from pro football.

== Baseball career ==
Bernardi had a very brief baseball career. He played for the Des Moines Bruins, the class A affiliate for the Chicago Cubs. Bernardi played in a mere three games, getting one hit in four at bats.

== Personal life ==
In 2012, the University of Colorado inducted Bernardi into the school's Athletic Hall Of Fame Bernardi has a wife named Susie. He also has two daughters, Lisa and Paula, and a son, Frank.
