= Roddy Mote =

American college football coach

Current position
- Title: Head coach
- Team: Harding
- Conference: GAC
- Record: 12–0

Playing career
- 1984–1987: Harding
- Positions: Quarterback, Running back

Coaching career (HC unless noted)
- 1988: Harding (GA)
- 1989: The Colony (TX) High School (asst.)
- 1990: Goodpasture Academy (TN) (asst.)
- 1991–1993: Greater Atlanta Christian (asst.)
- 1994–1999: Harding (RB)
- 2001–2004: Harding (DB)
- 2005–2007: Harding Academy (AR) (Asst.)
- 2008–2015: Harding Academy (AR)
- 2016: Harding (LB)
- 2017–2025: Harding (DC/LB)
- 2026–present: Harding

Administrative career (AD unless noted)
- 2000: Harding (asst. Dean of Students)

Head coaching record
- Overall: 12–0 (college); 93–12 (high school)

Roddy Mote is an American college football coach. He is the head football coach for Harding University in Searcy, Arkansas, a position he has held since January 6, 2026.

Mote was a 3-year letterman for the Harding Bisons as a triple option quarterback and running back in the 1980s. He was a legacy Bison player, as his father and uncle were primary Harding football players in the late 1950s and the 1960s. He had a significant knee injury going into his senior season and actually then began coaching as a student assistant coach before going on to become a graduate assistant coach. His uncle Jerry Mote was a long-time player and assistant at Harding and then head coach at Searcy High School. His father Gail Mote was a Harding fullback and cornerback, and was the long-time head coach at St. Marys, West Virginia, where Roddy Mote was an All-State player for his father.

Mote won two state championships as head coach at Harding Academy in Searcy, Arkansas, before becoming the defensive coordinator for the NCAA Division II Harding Bisons. He was a top coordinator for the 2023 D2 national championship team and the 2025 national championship runner up.

== Head coaching record ==
=== College ===
Year	Team	Overall	Conference	Standing	Bowl/playoffs
Harding Bisons (Great American Conference) (2026–present)
2026	Harding	12–0	11–0		1-0
Total:		12–0			
