= Frank Turbeville =

American football coach (1908–1978)

Playing career
- 1920–1923: Ouachita Baptist
- Position: Halfback

Coaching career (HC unless noted)
- 1928: Harding

Head coaching record
- Overall: 3–1–2 (college)

Frank Turbeville was an American college football player and coach. He served as the head football coach at Harding College—now known as Harding University—for one season, in 1928. He led the team to the best season in the program's young history, with a record of 3–1–2.

Turbeville played football at Ouachita Baptist College—now known as Ouachita Baptist University under head coach Morley Jennings and in the 1920s, and was hailed as the best player in program football history. He also starred in basketball and baseball. The Ouachitonian wrote:

"The story of Frank Turbeville hardly needs retelling in Arkansas. Hailed as probably the greatest athletic Ouachita ever produced, he blazed a brilliant path through state athletics. Four-year letter man in football, three years all-state, captain and outstanding star, a great player most feared and prepared for by opposing teams; tireless, powerful and always fighting, he was a veritable football machine. He was an ideal captain, knowing the game thoroughly, and always setting the pace. Certainly Ouachita has never produced a greater football player than "Tubby"."

Turbeville left Harding after one year, and was replaced by one of his star Bison players, Buck Arnold.
