= Clint Kercheville =

American football coach

Clint Kercheville was an American football coach, and the second football coach of Harding College, in 1925.

A description of the season in the Harding yearbook The Petit Jean listed concerns such as starting the football season too late, lack of training, as well as one long trip through bad weather to make it to the first ever meeting with Magnolia A&M, which would still be a Harding rival a century later.

Regardless of Petit Jean quips about "lack of training," Coach Kercheville was lauded as:

"a tireless worker...His two mottoes are, "There Shall Be No Regrets" and "They Shall Not Pass." He is a valuable asset to any team."

"the Coach intends to start earlier next season and really put old Harding on the football map."

Kercheville ended the year with a record of 2–3–1. After playing Arkansas Tech's 3rd Team in 1924, Harding moved up to playing Tech's 2nd Team in 1925. The year also marked the first meeting against future rival Arkansas State Teacher's College, a loss against ASTC's 2nd Team.
