= Harding Bisons football =

American college football team

2026 Harding Bisons football team
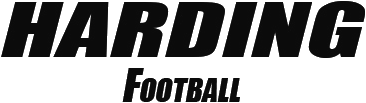
- First season: 1924; 102 years ago
- Athletic director: Jeff Morgan
- Head coach: Roddy Mote; 1st season, 12–0 (1.000)
- Location: Searcy, Arkansas
- Stadium: First Security Stadium (capacity: 6,500)
- NCAA division: Division II
- Conference: Great American Conference
- Colors: Black and gold
- All-time record: 422–312–16 (.573)

NCAA Division II championships
- 2023

Conference championships
- 9
- Rivalries: Arkansas Tech; Henderson State; Ouachita Baptist; Southern Arkansas
- Fight song: Harding Fight Song
- Mascot: Buff the Bison
- Website: hardingsports.com

The Harding Bisons football program represents Harding University in college football as a Division II member of the Great American Conference. Harding is located in Searcy, Arkansas. The Bisons are led by head coach Roddy Mote, a former Harding quarterback, running back, longtime assistant and defensive coordinator. They were NCAA Division II national champions in 2023, and national runner-up in 2025, led by Paul Simmons.

The 2016 and 2017 seasons were some of the most successful runs in the history of the program. Ronnie Huckeba's 2016 squad, before his retirement from coaching, won the conference title and made it to the quarterfinals of the NCAA Division II playoffs. The following year under first-year head coach Paul Simmons, the Bisons won three post-season games to make it to the semifinals of the playoffs before losing to East Texas A&M (the storied football program formerly and widely known as East Texas State, now in NCAA Division I FCS).

Simmons achieved his first undefeated regular season in 2023, with a mark of 11–0. That team later defeated Lenoir–Rhyne in the NCAA Division II semifinals to send Harding to its first-ever national championship game. On December 16, 2023, Harding defeated Colorado School of Mines to win the 2023 NCAA Division II national championship.

On December 13th, 2025, Harding defeated Kutztown 49-27 to make its way to Harding's second national championship game. The next week, Harding lost the national championship game to Ferris State 21-42.

On January 6, 2026, Coach Paul Simmons was promoted to the newly created position of general manager of the Bisons football program, and longtime assistant and defensive coordinator Roddy Mote was promoted to head coach.

== History ==
Harding's football program began the same year that Harding College came into existence in 1924. The first eight years produced a 19–28–6 record, with most of the wins coming against high schools or college B and C teams. But the Bisons cultivated a steady following of excited students and townspeople, as evidenced in various volumes of Harding's yearbook, The Petit Jean.

Among the opponents in the 1920s were five colleges that would become rivalries lasting into the 21st century. Arkansas State Teacher's College would eventually become the University of Central Arkansas, and Magnolia A&M would become Southern Arkansas University. Henderson State University had begun as Arkadelphia Methodist College and was referred to as Henderson-Brown when Harding began playing them. Harding first played against Arkansas Tech University's Third Team in 1924, and advanced to playing Tech's Second Team the next year. The first matchup against the Ouachita Baptist Tigers was in 1928, ending in a 0–0 tie.

One special moment in Harding football history was a 1926 trip to Fayetteville, Arkansas, and a drubbing by the Arkansas Razorback Freshman Team. The head coach of the Razorbacks was Francis Schmidt, who was nicknamed Francis "Close the Gates of Mercy" Schmidt. He adored running up the score on lesser equipped teams. Harding, with many first-year players itself that year, was beaten badly by the Razorback freshmen, 0–74.

As the effects of the Great Depression began to set in, the Harding College football program folded after the 1931 season due to the economic hardship. The Petit Jean yearbook included an ominous entry in regard to the football team's finances in 1931:

"To L. S. Chambers too much credit cannot be given. It was only by his continual efforts in managing the finances that the heavy (football) schedule was made possible."

The hope of again fielding an intercollegiate team was still alive through Harding College's dormant years, from 1932 to 1958. One of Paul Fiser's prized players in 1931 was Ervin "Pinky" Berryhill. Berryhill would one day be the man to serve as athletics director when the intercollegiate football program would finally be reinstated almost three decades later in 1959.

Intercollegiate athletics for all sports (football, basketball, baseball, all men's and women's sports) at Harding were disbanded in the 1930s due to the depression economy. In its place, led by former Harding athlete and then-current faculty member Berryhill, the Harding administration approved intramural competition on campus. As a result, 1939 saw “football” come back to the Harding campus in the form of two-hand touch intramural teams. Less than a decade later, the form of intra campus football had turned to “ragtag” ball, or flag football. Some future Harding assistant coaches and academic professors were members of these teams, including Clifton L. Ganus Jr., who would later become president of Harding University from 1965 to 1987.

The fall of 1955 saw the return of full pads tackle football to Harding, in the form of intramural teams of 8-man football composed of students. Enough players showed up each autumn to form four teams of on-campus 8-man tackle football from 1955 to 1958. An All-Star game at the end of each season, which came to be called The Bison All-Star Game, came complete with the honoring of maids and a queen of the highlighted all-star game. By year two of fully padded 8-man tackle football, 1956, the student association sponsored a game each Saturday night, so that the excitement of Saturday college football was back at Harding College. Autumn of 1957 saw the return of several intercollegiate sports for Harding, but football still had to wait two more years. Several of the players on these 8-man tackle intramural teams would go on to be part of the 1959 reemergence of Harding Bisons football on the intercollegiate level.

The main impactful decision by Athletics Director Pinky Berryhill in leading Harding back into intercollegiate football in 1959 was the recruitment and hiring of an Oklahoma Sooner football legend.

The Harding football program was reignited from the ground up in 1959 by former legendary Oklahoma Sooner player Carl Allison, who had been a rare four-year starter for the Sooners during the Bud Wilkinson dynasty. He was a captain on OU's 1954 undefeated team, and was drafted in the 22nd round of the 1955 NFL draft by the Chicago Bears, coached by George Halas.

Oklahoma head coach Bud Wilkinson, who played for Bernie Bierman at the University of Minnesota, stated the following regarding Carl Allison:

“I never hope to coach a finer football player (than Allison). Carl started every game we have played the last four years. He was never late to practice, never hurt, never sick. He was a fine captain. He is a straight B student. In reliability and character he stands at the very top of our squad. We could always depend on him to do his job well. I don't mean to take anything away from our other more-publicized boys but I've never seen a better all-around football player, nor a more reliable one, than Carl Allison.”

Bud Wilkinson's high praise of Allison as a leader and player came almost a decade after Wilkinson himself had created the Oklahoma drill, a drill meant to weed out hundreds of former World War II soldiers trying out for the Oklahoma Sooners football team on the G.I. Bill.

Carl Allison did not make the cut for the Chicago Bears roster, and instead instantly became the head football coach at Clinton (OK) High School. Moving straight from the playing field to head coach, he took what he had learned playing for Wilkinson at Oklahoma, and became part of the Bud Wilkinson coaching tree. He hired another first year coach, John Prock, a former three-year starting lineman at Southwestern Oklahoma State. The former coach at Hollis, Oklahoma, Joe Bailey Metcalf, had taken the Southwestern job and recruited his old player Prock to Weatherford, as Prock was returning home from military service in Korea. Prock had grown up in Hollis around future Texas Longhorn coach Darrell Royal, who had also played at Oklahoma under Bud Wilkinson, and who also revered the mentorship of Coach Joe Metcalf.

Carl Allison and his assistant Prock then joined forces to restart the Harding football program in Searcy, Arkansas. When Allison briefly returned to Norman as a scout for the Oklahoma Sooners, John Prock became Harding's head coach and would serve in that capacity for the next two-plus decades. He would go on to coach the next three future Harding head coaches, as well as hiring two of them, Randy Tribble and Ronnie Huckeba, as long-time assistants.

Counting Allison and Prock restarting the Harding football program, the Bisons had only 6 head coaches between 1959 and 2025. Larry Richmond, Tribble and Huckeba, all had winning records, as did coach Paul Simmons, who became the winningest percentage coach in Harding's history. Roddy Mote became the new head coach in January 2026.

Harding's historic influence from the state of Oklahoma made for significant football recruiting inroads into the Sooner state. With the latter influence of long-term assistant coaches, some of whom became Harding head coaches, a much wider permanent net was cast throughout the most fertile recruiting grounds of the south. Richmond was a Memphis area native, but had also coached in Louisiana and Texas. Tribble was a Florida native who also had coached in Texas, and Huckeba was a Georgia native who had previously coached in Texas and Louisiana. Today's Harding football recruiting base is nationwide and beyond.

The first conference championship in Harding history came in 1972. The team finished the season ranked 6th in the nation, but the NAIA only allowed four teams into the playoffs at that point, so Harding settled for a Cowboy Bowl bid, defeating Langston. Other conference titles followed in 1976 (resulting in a Pasadena, Texas Shrine Bowl appearance and loss to Abilene Christian) and 1989 (a first round NAIA playoff loss to Emporia State).

The 1992 squad finished 7th in the nation and qualified for the 8-team NAIA playoffs. Their opening round opponent, however, was the number one team in the nation, Central State (Ohio). Central State defeated the Bisons and went on the win the 1992 NAIA national championship.

The Arkansas Intercollegiate Conference broke up in 1995, with the public university members leaving for the Gulf South Conference. That left Harding and Ouachita Baptist to form a coalition as NAIA independents for two years while they worked together to move to NCAA Division II, and to the Lone Star Conference in 1997. They moved together again to the Gulf South Conference in 2000, enjoying a renewal of old rivalries. This also began an 11-year period of forging new rivalries in the Deep South, among areas they had already been recruiting for decades.

After working together with other old Arkansas and Oklahoma rivals to help form the Great American Conference in 2011, Harding has enjoyed a steady climb toward the top of NCAA Division II football, with ten playoff appearances, including the national championship in 2023.

The radio voice of the Harding Bisons is two-time Sullivan Award (best radio broadcaster in Arkansas) winner Billy Morgan.

=== Conference affiliations ===
- 1924–1931: Independent
- 1932–1958: No team
- 1960–1994: Arkansas Intercollegiate Conference
- 1995–1996: NAIA Independent
- 1997–1999; Lone Star Conference
- 2000–2010: Gulf South Conference
- 2011–present: Great American Conference

== Championships ==
=== Conference championships ===
Year	Conference	Overall Record	Conference Record
1972†	Arkansas Intercollegiate Conference	10–1	5–1
1976†	Arkansas Intercollegiate Conference	7–5	5–1
1989†	Arkansas Intercollegiate Conference	7–4	5–1
2016	Great American Conference	11–0	11–0
2021	Great American Conference	10–1	10–1
2023	Great American Conference	11–0	11–0
2024†	Great American Conference	10–1	10–1
2025	Great American Conference	11–0	11–0
2026	Great American Conference	11–0	11–0

† Denotes shared title.

=== National championships ===
Year	Association	Division	Head coach	Record	Opponent	Result
2023	NCAA (1)	Division II (1)	Paul Simmons	15–0 (11–0 GAC)	Colorado Mines	W, 38–7

== Playoff appearances ==
=== NAIA Division I ===
The Bisons participated in the NAIA Division I Playoffs twice: 1989 and 1992

Year	Opponent	Round	Result
1989	Emporia State	1st Round	L 9–32
1992	Central State (OH)	1st Round	L 0–34

=== NCAA Division II ===
The Bisons have participated in the NCAA Division II Playoffs eleven times: 2012, 2014, 2016, 2017, 2018, 2019, 2021, 2023, 2024, 2025 and 2026

Year	Opponent	Round	Result
2012	Northwest Missouri State	1st Round	L 0–35
2014	Pittsburg State	1st Round	L 42–59
2016	Central Missouri	1st Round	W 48–31
2016	Sioux Falls	2nd Round	W 27–24 ^{OT}
2016	Northwest Missouri State	Quarterfinals	L 0–35
2017	Indianapolis	1st Round	W 27–24
2017	Ashland	2nd Round	W 34–24
2017	Ferris State	Quarterfinals	W 16–14
2017	East Texas A&M	Semifinals	L 17–31
2018	Ferris State	1st Round	L 19–21
2019	Northwest Missouri State	1st Round	L 6–7
2021	Washburn	1st Round	W 30–14
2021	Northwest Missouri State	2nd Round	L 9–28
2023	Central Missouri	2nd Round Bye	W 35–34
2023	Grand Valley State	Quarterfinals	W 7–6
2023	Lenoir–Rhyne	Semifinals	W 55–14
2023	Colorado Mines	National Championship	W 38–7
2024	Pittsburg State	1st Round	W 48–3
2024	Grand Valley State	2nd Round	W 44–26
2024	Ferris State	Quarterfinals	L 7–41
2025	Northwest Missouri State	1st Round	W 38–16
2025	Pittsburg State	2nd Round	W 37–21
2025	Texas–Permian Basin	Quarterfinals	W 34–28
2025	Kutztown	Semifinals	W 49–27
2025	Ferris State	National Championship	L 21–42
2026	Washburn	1st Round	W 58-31
2026	Northwest Missouri State	2nd Round	

== Bowl games ==
The Bisons have participated in three College Division bowl games.

Date	Opponent	Bowl	Result
December 6, 1972	Langston Lions	Cowboy Bowl	W 30–27
December 4, 1976	Abilene Christian Wildcats	San Jacinto Shrine Bowl	L 12–22
December 13, 2013	East Texas A&M	Live United Texarkana Bowl	W 44–3

== Records against historic rivals ==
- Arkansas Tech: 32–31
- Arkansas–Monticello: 37–24
- Central Arkansas: 6–30–3
- Henderson State: 28–33–1
- Millsaps College: 10–2–2
- North Alabama: 6–7
- Ouachita Baptist: 36–27–4
- Southeastern Oklahoma: 28–8
- Southern Arkansas: 33–28–1
- Tarleton State: 6–2–1
- West Alabama: 6–8
- West Georgia: 7–4

== Head coaching history ==
- Earl B. Thompson: 1924(2–2)
- Clint Kercheville: 1925 (2–3–1)
- Clyde Matthews: Player/Coach - 1926 (1–5)
- W. T. Henry: 1927 (0–8–1)
- Frank Turbeville: 1928 (3–1–2)
- Buck Arnold: 1929–1930 (7–6–2)
- Paul Fiser: 1931 (4–3)
- Carl Allison: 1959–1963 (13–26–3)
- John Prock: 1964–1987 (114–123–7)
- Larry Richmond: 1988–1993 (37–25–1)
- Randy Tribble: 1994–2007 (74–62–1)
- Ronnie Huckeba: 2007–2016 (49–35)
- Paul Simmons: 2017–2025 (92–16)
- Roddy Mote: 2026-present (12-0)

== Harding players in professional football ==
- Ronnie Peacock: 1972 - Pittsburgh Steelers
- Tom Ed Gooden: 1974 - Cleveland Browns, St Louis Cardinals, Dallas Cowboys
- Alan Dixon: 1974 - Minnesota Vikings, Seattle Seahawks
- Barney Crawford: 1975 - Miami Dolphins
- Bruce Baldwin: 1983 - Denver Broncos
- Greg Poston: 1984 - Kansas City Chiefs
- Gill Stegall: 1985 - Denver Gold (USFL): 1986 - Tampa Bay Bandits (USFL), Montreal Alouettes (CFL): 1987 - Montreal Alouettes (CFL), St Louis Cardinals: 1988 - Detroit Lions
- Tank Daniels: 2006 - Philadelphia Eagles: 2007 - New York Giants: 2008 - New York Giants, Philadelphia Eagles: 2009 - Hartford Colonials, Jacksonville Jaguars
- Kurt Adams: 2011–12 - Winnipeg Blue Bombers
- Eddie Russ: 2011–13 - Saskatchewan Roughriders
- Eddy Carmona: 2012-13 - Oakland Raiders
- Rene Stephan: 2012–14 - Winnipeg Blue Bombers
- Ty Powell: 2013 - Seattle Seahawks, NY Giants: 2013-2015 - Buffalo Bills: 2016 - Philadelphia Eagles
- Donatella Luckett: 2015 - Kansas City Chiefs, San Diego Chargers
- Segun Olubi: 2022–Present - Indianapolis Colts
