= Rudy Niswanger =

American football player (born 1982)

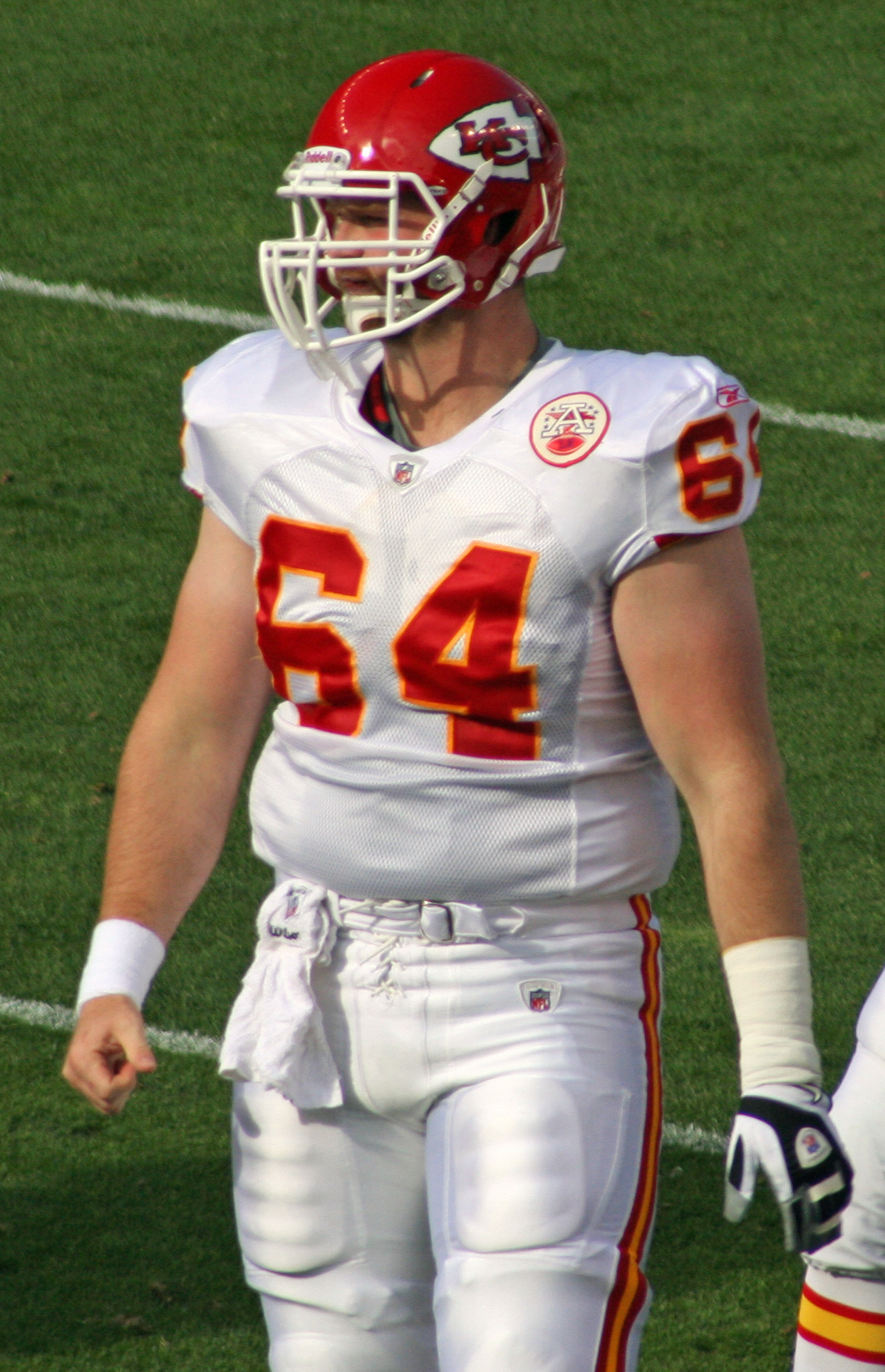
- Niswanger at a game in Denver in 2010

No. 64
- Position: Center

Personal information
- Born: November 9, 1982 (age 43); Monroe, Louisiana, U.S.
- Listed height: 6 ft 5 in (1.96 m)
- Listed weight: 301 lb (137 kg)

Career information
- High school: Ouachita Christian (Monroe, Louisiana)
- College: LSU
- NFL draft: 2006: undrafted

Career history
- Kansas City Chiefs (2006–2010); Detroit Lions (2011)*
- * Offseason or practice squad member only

Awards and highlights
- BCS national champion (2003); Draddy Trophy (2005); Wuerffel Trophy (2005); Second-team All-SEC (2005)

Career NFL statistics
- Games played: 56
- Games started: 31
- Stats at Pro Football Reference

Rudolph Nelson Niswanger (/ˈnaɪzwɒŋər/ NYZE-wong-ər; born November 9, 1982) is an American former professional football player who was a center in the National Football League (NFL). He was signed by the Kansas City Chiefs as an undrafted free agent in 2006. He played college football for the LSU Tigers.

== Early life ==
He is a native of Monroe, Louisiana, where he attended Ouachita Christian High School. He led his team to a 2A State Championship title in Football.

== College career ==
During his college career, he started at least one game in every offensive line position. As a senior, he was team captain and was elected as Second-team All-SEC.

== Professional career ==
=== Kansas City Chiefs ===
In 2006 season, Rudy signed a free agent contract with the Kansas City Chiefs. He played in five games at two different positions - guard and on special teams - in his first season. During the 2007 season, Niswanger appeared in 12 games, including five games as a reserve guard. His season ended on December 2 in a game against the San Diego Chargers, when he injured his right knee. He was placed on injured reserve the next day. Before the 2008 season, Niswanger became the starting center in the preseason. He started in 15 games, missing one game against the Chargers in Week 15.

A restricted free agent in the 2009 offseason, Niswanger re-signed with the Chiefs on April 24. During the offseason, the Chiefs signed veteran Mike Goff, who competed with Niswanger for the starting center position.

=== Detroit Lions ===
Niswanger signed with the Detroit Lions on August 10, 2011. Niswanger was cut by the team on September 3, 2011.

== Personal life ==
Niswanger is married to Patricia Hodge of Monroe, Louisiana and they make their home in Monroe, Louisiana, and they have 5 children. He is CEO of Joe Gear Companies.
