= Cal Browning =

American baseball player (1938–2022)

- Pitcher
- Born: March 16, 1938; Burns Flat, Oklahoma, U.S.
- Died: September 14, 2022 (aged 84); Oklahoma City, Oklahoma, U.S.
- Batted: Left Threw: Left

MLB debut
- June 12, 1960, for the St. Louis Cardinals

Last MLB appearance
- June 12, 1960, for the St. Louis Cardinals

MLB statistics
- Win–loss record: 0–0
- Earned run average: 40.50
- Strikeouts: 0
- Innings pitched: 02/3
- Stats at Baseball Reference

Teams
- St. Louis Cardinals (1960)

Calvin Duane Browning (March 16, 1938 – September 14, 2022) was an American professional baseball pitcher. He played for the St. Louis Cardinals of Major League Baseball (MLB), appearing in one game during the 1960 season.

== Early life and career ==
Browning was born in Burns Flat, Oklahoma, on March 16, 1938. His family moved to Clinton, Oklahoma, when he was in the eighth grade. He graduated from Clinton High School in 1956. He played baseball and football at Clinton. For the baseball team, he was an all-state pitcher. In football, he was an all-state fullback, but also played quarterback.

Bud Wilkinson recruited Browning to play college football for the Oklahoma Sooners at the University of Oklahoma. He was also recruited by the college football programs at the University of Tulsa, Purdue University, and the University of Kentucky. He attended Oklahoma State University and played college baseball for the Oklahoma State Cowboys for one year.

== Professional career ==
Browning signed as an undrafted free agent in 1957 with the St. Louis Cardinals, receiving a $4,000 signing bonus, the maximum bonus allowed. He made his professional debut with the Winnipeg Goldeyes of the Class C Northern League in 1957 and then played with the Rochester Red Wings of the Class AAA International League in 1958. After the 1958 season, he trained for the United States Army Reserve at Fort Leonard Wood.

Browning remained with Rochester until he was promoted to the major leagues by St. Louis in June 1960. Browning's lone MLB opportunity came in relief on Sunday, June 12, against the Pittsburgh Pirates at Busch Stadium. Starting pitcher Ron Kline had already surrendered four hits and three runs and left two men on base in only one-third of an inning when Browning came into the game. Facing his first big-league hitter, Pirate third baseman Don Hoak, Browning gave up a three-run home run to put Pittsburgh ahead 6–0, before escaping further damage. Then, in the second inning, Browning gave up singles to Dick Groat, Dick Stuart and Roberto Clemente and a base on balls to Bob Skinner, allowing two more runs without recording an out, before Curt Simmons relieved him. The Pirates won the game, 15–3.

The Cardinals returned Browning to Rochester after the game. They promoted him to the major leagues in September, but he did not appear in another game for the Cardinals. After the 1960 season, the Cardinals sent Browning, Leon Wagner, and a player to be named later to the Toronto Maple Leafs of the International League for Al Cicotte. The Cardinals sent Ellis Burton to Toronto in February 1961 to complete the trade. Browning struggled to begin the 1961 season and was sent to the Houston Buffs of the American Association in May; after a month in Houston, he was recalled to Toronto. After pitching for Toronto in 1962 and starting the 1963 season with them, he was traded to the Portland Beavers of the Pacific Coast League for infielder Hap Richie in June 1963. Browning retired from baseball after the 1963 season.

== Personal life ==
After his retirement from baseball, Browning worked at Elk Supply from 1963 to 1995, becoming chief executive officer. Browning was married twice and had four children.

Browning died on September 14, 2022, in Oklahoma City.
