= Veryl Switzer =

American football player (1932–2022)

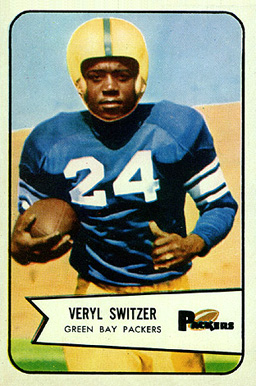
- Switzer on a 1954 Bowman football card

No. 27, 99, 84
- Positions: Halfback, defensive back

Personal information
- Born: August 6, 1932; Nicodemus, Kansas, U.S.
- Died: June 4, 2022 (aged 89); Manhattan, Kansas, U.S.
- Listed height: 5 ft 11 in (1.80 m)
- Listed weight: 190 lb (86 kg)

Career information
- College: Kansas State (1950–1953)
- NFL draft: 1954: 1st round, 4th overall pick

Career history
- Green Bay Packers (1954–1955); Calgary Stampeders (1958); Montreal Alouettes (1959–1960)

Awards and highlights
- Second-team All-American (1951); 3× First-team All-Big Seven (1951−1953); Kansas State Hall of Fame (1990)

Career NFL statistics
- Rushing yards: 160
- Rushing average: 5.2
- Receptions: 31
- Receiving yards: 269
- Total touchdowns: 5
- Stats at Pro Football Reference

Veryl A. Switzer (August 6, 1932 – June 4, 2022) was an American professional football player who was a halfback in the National Football League (NFL) and the Canadian Football League (CFL). He played in the NFL for 24 games with the Green Bay Packers before serving in the United States Air Force for two years, playing professional football in Canada, and becoming an administrator at his alma mater Kansas State where he is a hall of famer.

== Early life ==
Switzer is from Nicodemus, Kansas. His third cousin is American sprinter Dale Alexander.

Switzer played football for Kansas State University from 1951 to 1953. He held the career punt return record at KSU until 1995 and scored the second longest punt return touchdown in school history (93 yards on Sept 19 1953, one of two he posted that year). His best year was 1953 when he led Kansas State in rushing with 558 yards, receiving with eight catches for 211 yards, scoring with eight touchdowns and 49 points, punt returns with a 31.0-yard average and kick returns with a 22.3-yard average. Switzer was invited to the 1954 East–West Shrine Game.

Switzer was also an All-American jumper for the Kansas State Wildcats track and field team, finishing 3rd in the long jump at the 1982 NCAA Indoor Track and Field Championships and 2nd at the 1983 NCAA Indoor Track and Field Championships.

== Career ==
In 1954, the Green Bay Packers used the fourth overall pick in the first round of the 1954 NFL draft to sign Switzer. Switzer went on to play for two seasons with the Packers before serving two years in the United States Air Force as a first lieutenant. His attempt to resume his NFL career was unsuccessful when he was released by the Packers in September 1958. He headed north to professional football in the Canadian Football League with the Calgary Stampeders in 1958 and was subsequently traded to the Montreal Alouettes in March 1959. He played two seasons with that team.

== Later life ==
Switzer later worked for the Chicago Board of Education for ten years before returning to Kansas State as an administrator in 1969. He received a Masters in Education from Kansas State in 1974. He was Co-Director, Earl Woods National Youth Golf Academy and Associate Athletic Director for Academics. Switzer developed Kansas State's first university-wide student minority program, including numerous programs which are still extant, including Ebony Theater, United Black Voices, a Black Student Union, and Hispanic advocacy groups.

He was a charter member of the K-State Sports Hall of Fame. He is enshrined in the Kansas Sports Hall of Fame and the Kansas High School Activities Association Hall of Fame.

== Death ==
Switzer died in Manhattan, Kansas, on June 4, 2022, at the age of 89.
