= John Wayne Niles =

Politician, early Kansas pioneer (1842–?)

John Wayne Niles (c. 1842–?) was an American politician, political organizer, an early Kansas pioneer, and civil rights activist. An African American, he founded an all-Black political party, the Indemnity Party, which advocated for reparations in the form of land grants for those formerly enslaved. Niles was one of the founding settlement leaders of Nicodemus, Kansas, a freedmen's town.

== Early life ==
John Wayne Niles was born in about 1842 in Mississippi, to a white father and an African American mother. Niles had been enslaved in childhood, which may have influenced his advocation for slavery reparations in later life.

In 1869, he was incarcerated for murder of a man, but was pardoned before completing the sentencing.

== Career ==
After his release from prison, Niles moved to Kentucky where he became active within the Exodusters movement, an endeavor to create African American settlements in Kanas in order to encourage migration. He joined as one of the seven leaders in the Nicodemus, Kansas colony project, where he moved in 1877. Nicodemus was the first free Black settlement on the Great Plains, and one of the first American communities with Black leadership. In 1878, Niles was elected as the second president of the Nicodemus colony. In the mid-1878 there was a food shortage in Kansas which caused a struggle to maintain the colony.

Niles has been portrayed in a conflicted fashion, both as a hustler, and as someone who made sacrifices for his community. He has been described as a "brilliant orator who was also deceitful and manipulative". He is described as a "peripatetic rogue" in the book, From Here to Equality: Reparations for Black Americans in the Twenty-First Century (UNC Press, 2020).

In 1881, Niles took out a large loan using cobs of corn as loan collateral. However Niles had lied about the amount of corn, the worth of the corn, and he claimed to have possession of all of the corn (which he did not); all of this brought legal charges of fraud against him. Niles was able to defend himself in court against a team of lawyers and eventually won his case.

After his corn trial ended, Niles moved to Phillips County, Arkansas. In the 1880s, Niles created the all-Black political party called the Indemnity Party, a group which supported obtaining land grants as a form of slavery reparations claim. In 1882, Niles opened a liquor store without a license in Lee County, Arkansas. In part because of his political activities, he was made a target; and the Black community came together in order to supported him and help him pay off his fines. He ended up spending four months in Arkansas state prison; after which he moved to Washington, D.C.

The political climate of Washington, D.C. during the late 1880s was not supportive of the Indemnity Party goals. In October 1883, the Civil Rights Act of 1875 was rejected by the U.S. Supreme Court. Less than a month later on November 3, 1883, there was an event called the Danville Massacre in Danville, Virginia; where many Black people died and were injured due to a political disagreement in public with white men. Benjamin Harris Brewster, the U.S. Attorney General had diverted the claims of the Indemnity Party by stating the party's land claims were under the state of Arkansas' jurisdiction, which would need to be taken to the U.S. Supreme Court to be appealed. John Sherman, an Ohio senator and brother of William Tecumseh Sherman presented a petition for land for slavery reparations in the U.S. Senate but it was tabled.

== Legacy ==
Niles was never able to pass any reparations acts in his lifetime, but 150 years later it is still an active topic of discussion in the United States.

He is described in the book, From Here to Equality: Reparations for Black Americans in the Twenty-First Century (UNC Press, 2020). Niles is one of the subjects addressed in the anthology book, Four Hundred Souls: A Community History of African America, 1619–2019 (Random House, 2021).

== See also ==
- Callie House
- California Reparations Task Force
- Civil Rights Cases, a group of U.S. Supreme Court cases decided in 1883
- List of freedmen's towns
