= Earl B. Thompson =

American football coach

Earl B. Thompson (died 1924) was an American football coach, and the very first football coach of Harding College, in 1924.

According to the Harding yearbook The Petit Jean, he was killed in a car wreck 3 or 4 games into the season. Afterward, the team dissolved for the year:

"Our coach was killed in a car wreck... For this reason we did not play anymore. He was a competent Coach and loved by all of us, we did not feel disposed to play after that. Next year we hope to have a strong team, with the ones who are here his year that expect to be back."

It is not known if that statement was written by representatives of the team itself, or by editors of the yearbook staff. Thompson's name was not mentioned in the entry. He was referred to as "our coach."

The first game in Harding football history was a 0–38 loss to College of the Ozarks. The next two games were a win over Dardanelle High School and a 10–7 victory over Arkansas Tech University's third string team. Arkansas Tech would still be a Harding rival a century later.
