= Ouachita Christian High School =

Private school in Louisiana, United States

Ouachita Christian School
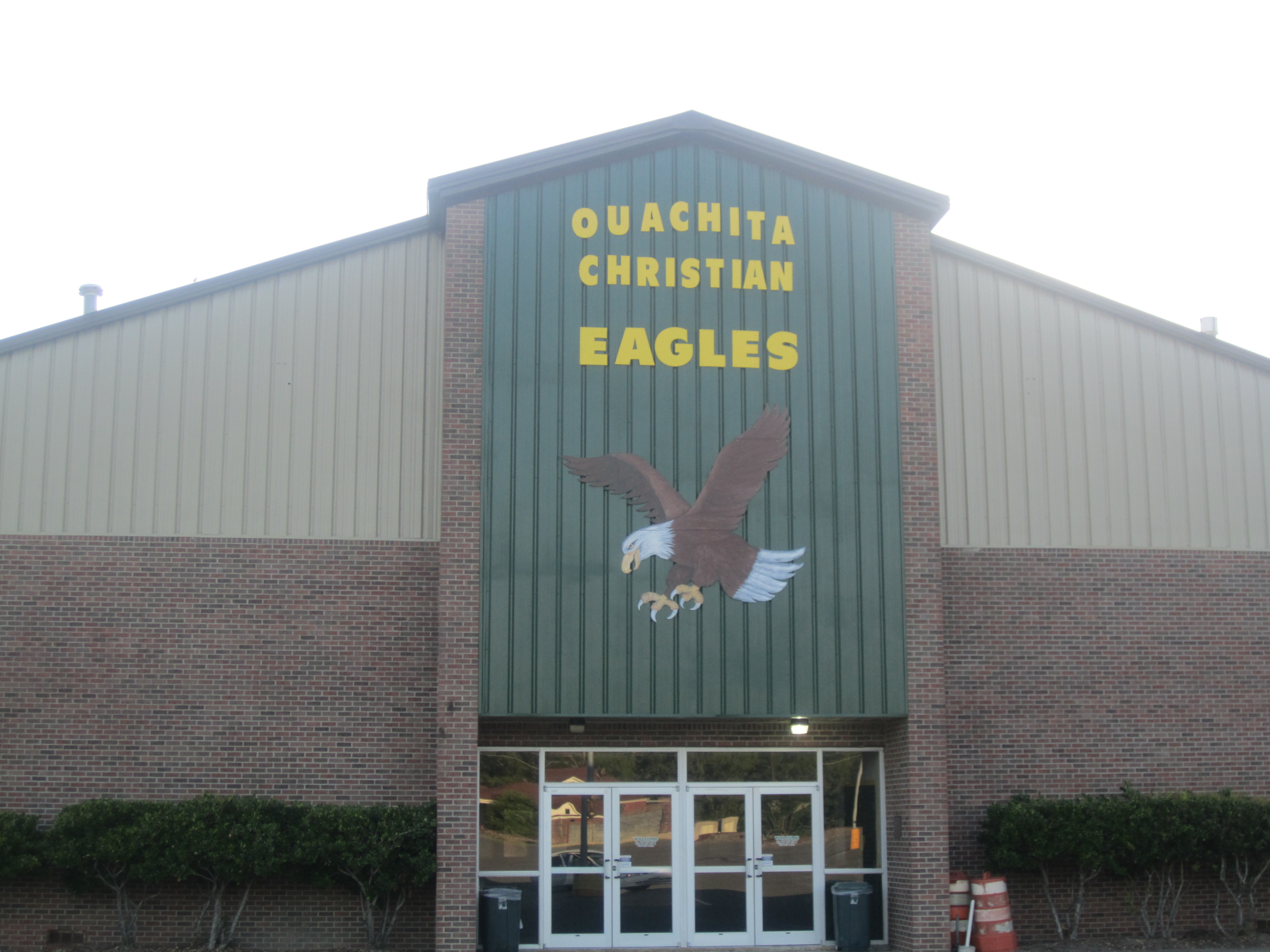

Location
- 7065 US-165; Monroe, (Ouachita Parish), Louisiana 71203; United States; 32.5988°N 92.0691°W

Information
- Type: Private
- Motto: Preparing Youth for Time and Eternity
- Established: 1974
- President: Micah Harper
- Principal: Dr. Mary Skelton
- Headmaster: Sherri Slade
- Grades: K–12
- Gender: Coeducational
- Language: English
- Colors: Green, Gold and White
- Athletics conference: LHSAA (2-2A)
- Sports: Football, baseball, softball, basketball, soccer, golf, tennis, track/field, cheerleading, dance, cross country, fishing
- Mascot: Eagle
- Team name: Eagles
- Rivals: St. Frederick Catholic High School (Monroe, Louisiana); Oak Grove High School (Oak Grove, Louisiana)
- Accreditation: LHSAA

Ouachita Christian School is a private K–12 Christian school in Monroe, Louisiana, United States.

== Athletics ==
Ouachita Christian High athletics competes in the LHSAA.

=== State championships ===
- Football (11) State Championships: 1973, 1977, 1984, 1985, 1997, 2000, 2011, 2012, 2014, 2019, 2022
- Baseball (10) State Championships: 1987, 1997, 2005, 2008, 2010, 2012, 2015, 2019, 2021, 2023
- Boys' Track (4) State Championship: 2012, 2021, 2022, 2023
- Girls' Track (3) State Championships: 2009, 2011, 2012

== Notable alumni ==
- Julia Letlow, U.S. Representative from Louisiana's 5th congressional district
- Luke Letlow, member-elect of the United States House of Representatives
- Rudy Niswanger, National Football League player for the Kansas City Chiefs (2006–2010)

== Notable faculty ==
- Stan Humphries, former NFL quarterback for the Washington Redskins and San Diego Chargers.
