= Clinton High School (Clinton, Oklahoma) =

Location
- 1930 Jaycee Lane; Clinton, Oklahoma 73601; United States; 35.507455°N 98.985853°W

Information
- School type: Public, secondary school
- Status: Open
- Principal: Paula Harp
- Staff: 32.60 (FTE)
- Grades: 9–12
- Enrollment: 609 (2024-2025)
- Student to teacher ratio: 18.68
- Language: English
- Hours in school day: 8
- Colors: Maroon and gold
- Team name: Red Tornado
- Website: chs.clintonokschools.org

Clinton High School is a 9th - 12th grade public high school in Clinton, Oklahoma. Clinton High School's mascot is the Red Tornado.

== Extracurricular activities ==
=== Athletics ===
Fall- football, fastpitch softball, volleyball, cross country

Winter- basketball, wrestling, weight lifting

Spring- baseball, track, soccer, golf

== Notable alumni ==
- Roy Bell, former CFL All-star
- Cal Browning, Major League Baseball pitcher for St Louis Cardinals
