= John Prock =

American football player and coach (1929–2012)

Biographical details
- Born: March 13, 1929; Hollis, Oklahoma
- Died: June 17, 2012 (aged 83); Searcy, Arkansas

Playing career
- 1948: Northwestern Oklahoma State
- 1952–1954: Southwestern State
- Position: Guard

Coaching career (HC unless noted)
- 1955–1958: Clinton HS (OK) (assistant)
- 1959–1963: Harding (assistant)
- 1964–1987: Harding

Head coaching record
- Overall: 114–123–7
- Bowls: 1–1

Accomplishments and honors

Championships
- 2 AIC (1972, 1976)

Clifford John Prock (March 13, 1929 – July 17, 2012) was an American football coach. He was the head football coach at Harding University in Searcy, Arkansas from 1964 to 1987. He compiled a record of 114–123–7 , retiring as the fifth-winningest active coach in the National Association of Intercollegiate Athletics (NAIA) in 1987.

A native of Hollis, Oklahoma, Prock was a four-sport star, growing up around other Hollis athletes Darrell Royal (future Texas coach), Ted Owens (future Kansas basketball coach) and Monte Moore (future major league baseball announcer). After playing college football for one semester at Northwestern Oklahoma State, Prock returned home to work for this father and for the county road department. He then joined the National Guard, deployed to Korea and became a platoon first sergeant of Company D, 120th Combat Engineers, using his road grader experience to help build roads and bridges for the allied forces. He then went back to college and played football, this time at Southwestern Oklahoma State, for three years, 1952-54.

Going to Southwestern Oklahoma State was an easy decision for Prock since his former coach at Hollis, Joe Metcalf, had become the head coach there. Prock started for three years at guard and earned All-Oklahoma Collegiate Conference honors his senior year. The influence of Metcalf was not only monumental for Prock, but also for former Hollis player Darrell Royal. Later after retiring as head coach of the Texas Longhorns, Royal would mention that even at the end of his coaching career in 1976, he was still using the principles learned from two men; Bud Wilkinson at the University of Oklahoma, and Metcalf of Hollis High School and Southwestern Oklahoma State.

Upon graduation from college, Prock took an assistant coaching job in 1955 under former Oklahoma Sooners football player Carl Allison at Clinton High School in Clinton, Oklahoma. Allison had learned the game as a four-year starter under coaching legend Bud Wilkinson, and very briefly as a Chicago Bear player under George Halas. Prock then followed Allison to Harding College as they worked to reinstate the Harding football program that had been dormant since 1931.

Prock then took over as head coach of Harding in 1964 after Allison returned to Norman to work for the Oklahoma Sooners as a scout. Coaching the Bisons through the 1987 season, Prock tutored three players who would go on to become the next three winning head coaches at Harding after his retirement; Larry Richmond, Randy Tribble and Ronnie Huckeba. Tribble and Huckeba were also long-time assistant coaches under Prock.

== Head coaching record ==
| Year | Team | Overall | Conference | Standing | Bowl/playoffs |
|---|---|---|---|---|---|
Harding Bisons (Arkansas Intercollegiate Conference) (1964–1987)
| 1964 | Harding | 2–8 | 1–6 | 7th | |
| 1965 | Harding | 5–3–1 | 3–3–1 | T–4th | |
| 1966 | Harding | 6–3 | 3–3 | T–4th | |
| 1967 | Harding | 3–7 | 0–6 | 7th | |
| 1968 | Harding | 2–8 | 0–6 | 7th | |
| 1969 | Harding | 7–2–1 | 4–2 | 3rd | |
| 1970 | Harding | 5–5 | 3–3 | 4th | |
| 1971 | Harding | 5–5 | 2–4 | T–4th | |
| 1972 | Harding | 10–1 | 5–1 | T–1st | W Cowboy Bowl |
| 1973 | Harding | 7–3 | 4–2 | T–2nd | |
| 1974 | Harding | 5–4–1 | 3–2–1 | 3rd | |
| 1975 | Harding | 4–6 | 2–4 | 5th | |
| 1976 | Harding | 7–5 | 5–1 | T–1st | L Shrine Bowl |
| 1977 | Harding | 4–7 | 2–4 | T–5th | |
| 1978 | Harding | 5–4–1 | 3–2–1 | 4th | |
| 1979 | Harding | 4–6 | 2–4 | T–5th | |
| 1980 | Harding | 3–8 | 1–5 | T–6th | |
| 1981 | Harding | 2–9 | 0–6 | 7th | |
| 1982 | Harding | 5–6 | 1–5 | 7th | |
| 1983 | Harding | 3–6–1 | 0–5–1 | 7th | |
| 1984 | Harding | 5–3–1 | 2–3–1 | 5th | |
| 1985 | Harding | 5–5 | 2–5 | 6th | |
| 1986 | Harding | 4–5–1 | 3–4 | 5th | |
| 1987 | Harding | 6–4 | 3–3 | T–3rd | |
| Harding: | | 114–123–7 | 54–89–5 | | |
| Total: | | 114–123–7 | | | |
National championship Conference title Conference division title or championship game berth
