= Charles Washington (defensive back, born 1966) =

American football player (born 1966)

No. 46, 26
- Position: Defensive back

Personal information
- Born: October 8, 1966 (age 60); Shreveport, Louisiana, U.S.
- Listed height: 6 ft 1 in (1.85 m)
- Listed weight: 212 lb (96 kg)

Career information
- High school: H. Grady Spruce (Dallas, Texas)
- College: Texas (1985); Cameron (1986–1988)
- NFL draft: 1989: 7th round, 185th overall pick

Career history
- Indianapolis Colts (1989); Kansas City Chiefs (1990–1991); Indianapolis Colts (1992)*; Green Bay Packers (1992)*; Atlanta Falcons (1992); Indianapolis Colts (1993)*; Atlanta Falcons (1993–1994); Toronto Argonauts (1996)
- * Offseason or practice squad member only

Awards and highlights
- NAIA Division I national champion (1987); Second-team All-American (1987)

Career NFL statistics
- Tackles: 31
- Interceptions: 1
- Fumble recoveries: 5
- Stats at Pro Football Reference

Charles Edwin Washington (born October 8, 1966) is an American former professional football player who was a defensive back for six seasons in the National Football League (NFL) with the Indianapolis Colts, Kansas City Chiefs and Atlanta Falcons. He was selected by the Colts in the seventh round of the 1989 NFL draft after playing college football for the Cameron Aggies. Washington also played for the Toronto Argonauts of the Canadian Football League (CFL).

== Early life ==
Charles Edwin Washington was born on October 8, 1966, in Shreveport, Louisiana. He attended H. Grady Spruce High School in Dallas, Texas.

== College career ==
Washington was a member of the Texas Longhorns of the University of Texas at Austin in 1985 but did not play. He transferred to Cameron University, where he played for the Cameron Aggies from 1986 to 1987. He helped the 1987 Aggies win the NAIA Division I national championship and also earned second-team All-American honors that year. He was listed as ineligible in 1988. Washington was inducted into the Cameron Athletics Hall of Fame in 2016.

== Professional career ==
Pre-draft measurables
Height	Weight	40-yard dash	10-yard split	20-yard split	Vertical jump
6 ft 0 3/8 in (1.84 m)	195 lb (88 kg)	4.72 s	1.62 s	2.80 s	35.5 in (0.90 m)

Washington was selected by the Indianapolis Colts in the seventh round, with the 185th overall pick, of the 1989 NFL draft. He officially signed with the team on July 26. He was waived on September 4 but re-signed the next day. He played in all 16 games for the Colts during his rookie year in 1989 and returned one punt for six yards. He became a free agent after the season.

Washington signed with the Kansas City Chiefs on April 1, 1990. He appeared in six games for the Chiefs before being placed on injured reserve on October 18, 1990. He was activated on January 4, 1991, and appeared in a playoff game the next day. He played in all 16 games for the Chiefs during the 1991 season, recording 17 tackles, one interception, and one fumble recovery. Washington was waived on December 25, 1991.

Washington was claimed off waivers by the Colts on January 27, 1992. However, he became a free agent shortly thereafter.

Washington signed with the Green Bay Packers on March 17, 1992, and was waived on August 31, 1992.

He was signed by the Atlanta Falcons on September 17, 1992. He appeared in 14 games for the Falcons in 1992, recording one fumble recovery. He became a free agent after the season.

Washington was signed by the Colts again on July 20, 1993. He was released on August 23, 1993.

He signed with the Falcons again on November 27, 1993. He played in six games for the team during the 1993 season, recovering two fumbles. He became a free agent after the season but re-signed with the Falcons on March 31, 1994. Washington appeared in all 16 games, starting one, in 1994, accumulating eight solo tackles, six assisted tackles, and one fumble recovery. He became a free agent again after the 1994 season.

=== Toronto Argonauts ===
After sitting out the 1995 season, Washington was picked up as a linebacker by the Toronto Argonauts of the Canadian Football League in 1996. He was initially cut at the final roster cut in late June, but was brought back to fill the last roster spot before the first game. He played in two games for the Argonauts, posting two special teams tackles, before being released again two games into the season for being 90 minutes late to practice, his 3rd such offense.
