= Joe Don Looney =

American football player (1942–1988)

No. 32, 35, 26
- Positions: Fullback, Halfback

Personal information
- Born: October 10, 1942; San Angelo, Texas, U.S.
- Died: September 24, 1988 (aged 45); Terlingua, Texas, U.S.
- Listed height: 6 ft 1 in (1.85 m)
- Listed weight: 230 lb (104 kg)

Career information
- High school: R. L. Paschal (Fort Worth, Texas); Admiral Farragut Academy (St. Petersburg, Florida)
- College: Texas (1960); Cameron Aggies (1961); Oklahoma (1962-1963)
- NFL draft: 1964: 1st round, 12th overall pick
- AFL draft: 1964: 6th round, 44th overall pick

Career history
- New York Giants (1964)*; Baltimore Colts (1964); Detroit Lions (1965–1966); Washington Redskins (1966–1967); New Orleans Saints (1969)
- * Offseason or practice squad member only

Awards and highlights
- Second-team All-American (1962); First-team All-Big Eight (1962)

Career NFL statistics
- Rushing yards: 724
- Rushing average: 3.4
- Receptions: 26
- Receiving yards: 171
- Total touchdowns: 13
- Stats at Pro Football Reference

Joe Don Looney (October 10, 1942 – September 24, 1988) was an American football fullback and halfback who played professionally in the National Football League (NFL) for the New York Giants, Baltimore Colts, Detroit Lions, Washington Redskins, and the New Orleans Saints.

== Early life ==
Looney was born in San Angelo, Texas, the son of Don Looney, who played college football at TCU and then in the NFL for the Pittsburgh Steelers in 1940 and the Philadelphia Eagles from 1941 to 1942. The younger Looney attended Admiral Farragut Academy in St. Petersburg, Florida and R. L. Paschal High School in Fort Worth.

== College career ==
In his first semester at the University of Texas, Looney received four Fs and one D. Looney responded by dropping out and enrolling at Texas Christian University (TCU). He was eventually kicked out of that school and transferred to Cameron Junior College, where he played for Leroy Montgomery on the national champion 1961 Cameron Aggies football team. He set a punting record in the 1961 Junior Rose Bowl, as his team won the junior college national championship. He made second team All-American with the University of Oklahoma in 1962, leading them to the Big Eight Conference championship. He played in only three games in 1963. Head coach Bud Wilkinson kicked him off the team after Looney netted four yards in six carries in a game against Texas. Looney did not get along with Wilkinson, and it was also alleged he had punched assistant coach Johnny Tatum, though Tatum debunked that claim.

== Professional career ==
Looney was selected in the first round with the 12th overall of the 1964 NFL draft by the New York Giants. He was also selected in the sixth round of the 1964 AFL draft by the Kansas City Chiefs, but chose to play in the NFL instead. He was with the Giants just 25 days before they traded him along with offensive lineman Lou Kirouac to the Baltimore Colts for wide receiver R. C. Owens and safety Andy Nelson during training camp on August 24, 1964. As a member of the Giants, Looney racked up a number of fines for violating team rules.

Looney had only 23 carries with Baltimore that season. In November, he got into an argument about politics with a couple, then later that night, broke into their apartment with a friend and attacked them. He received one year's probation and a fine.

The Colts traded Looney and an undisclosed draft pick to the Detroit Lions following on June 3, 1965, for linebacker Dennis Gaubatz. He put together one good season, racking up 114 carries for 356 yards and five touchdowns. While with Detroit, Looney was told by coach Harry Gilmer to carry in a play to the quarterback. Looney refused and told Gilmer, "If you want a messenger boy, call Western Union."

Detroit traded Looney to the Washington Redskins, where he had an uneventful tenure. He had 55 carries for 178 yards. The only highlight of his time with the Redskins came on a play in which he did not even have the ball. He was pass protecting for quarterback Sonny Jurgensen, and ended up leveling an onrushing pass rusher with a right hook to the jaw. When he tried to renegotiate his contract, he was let go.

In 1968, Looney was called up by the United States Army to go to Vietnam. He joined a lawsuit that claimed that a reserve unit could not be sent to fight in an undeclared war, but it was defeated.

When he returned to the United States, he signed on with the New Orleans Saints. He had three carries for -3 yards with the Saints that year, and retired after the season.

Looney was ranked as the most uncoachable player in NFL history by NFL Films president Steve Sabol. He would often intentionally run the wrong way on plays in practice in order to make things more challenging for himself. He once skipped several practices. When questioned about his absences, he responded by saying, "If practice makes perfect and perfection is impossible, why practice?"

== After football ==
After his retirement from football he converted to Hinduism and joined the Siddha Yoga movement led by Swami Muktananda. Stan Trout, a fellow convert, alleged that Looney was one of Muktananda's "enforcers" who intimidated people into obeying him.

Looney pled guilty to illegal possession of a firearm in federal court on January 7, 1974. He was sentenced to three years' probation. On February 5, 1988, he received a presidential pardon from Ronald Reagan. Looney died at the age of 45, on September 24, 1988, near Luna Vista north of Terlingua, Texas, when his motorcycle ran off a rural highway and crashed into a fence.
