= Cameron Aggies =

US athletics team, based in Lawton, Oklahoma

- University: Cameron University
- Conference: LSC (primary)
- NCAA: Division II
- Athletic director: Louis Izzi
- Location: Lawton, Oklahoma
- Varsity teams: 14 (6 men's, 8 women's)
- Football stadium: Cameron Stadium
- Basketball arena: Aggie Gym
- Baseball stadium: McCord Field
- Softball stadium: McMahon Field and Athletics Center
- Tennis venue: Streich-Henry Tennis Complex
- Nickname: Aggies
- Colors: Black and gold
- Website: cameronaggies.com
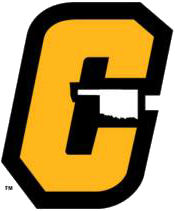

The Cameron Aggies are the athletic team that represent Cameron University, located in Lawton, Oklahoma, in NCAA Division II intercollegiate sports.

The Aggies compete as members of the Lone Star Conference for all 14 varsity sports.

== Varsity sports ==
=== Teams ===
Men's sports

- Baseball
- Basketball
- Cross country
- Golf
- Tennis
- Track and field

Women's sports

- Basketball
- Cross country
- Golf
- Softball
- Spirit team
- Tennis
- Track and field
- Volleyball

== National championships ==
=== Team ===
Sport	Association	Division	Year	Runner-up	Score
Men's basketball (1)	NAIA	Single	1980	Alabama State	84–77
Football (1)	NAIA	Division I	1987	Carson–Newman	30–2

== Individual sports ==
=== Men's basketball ===
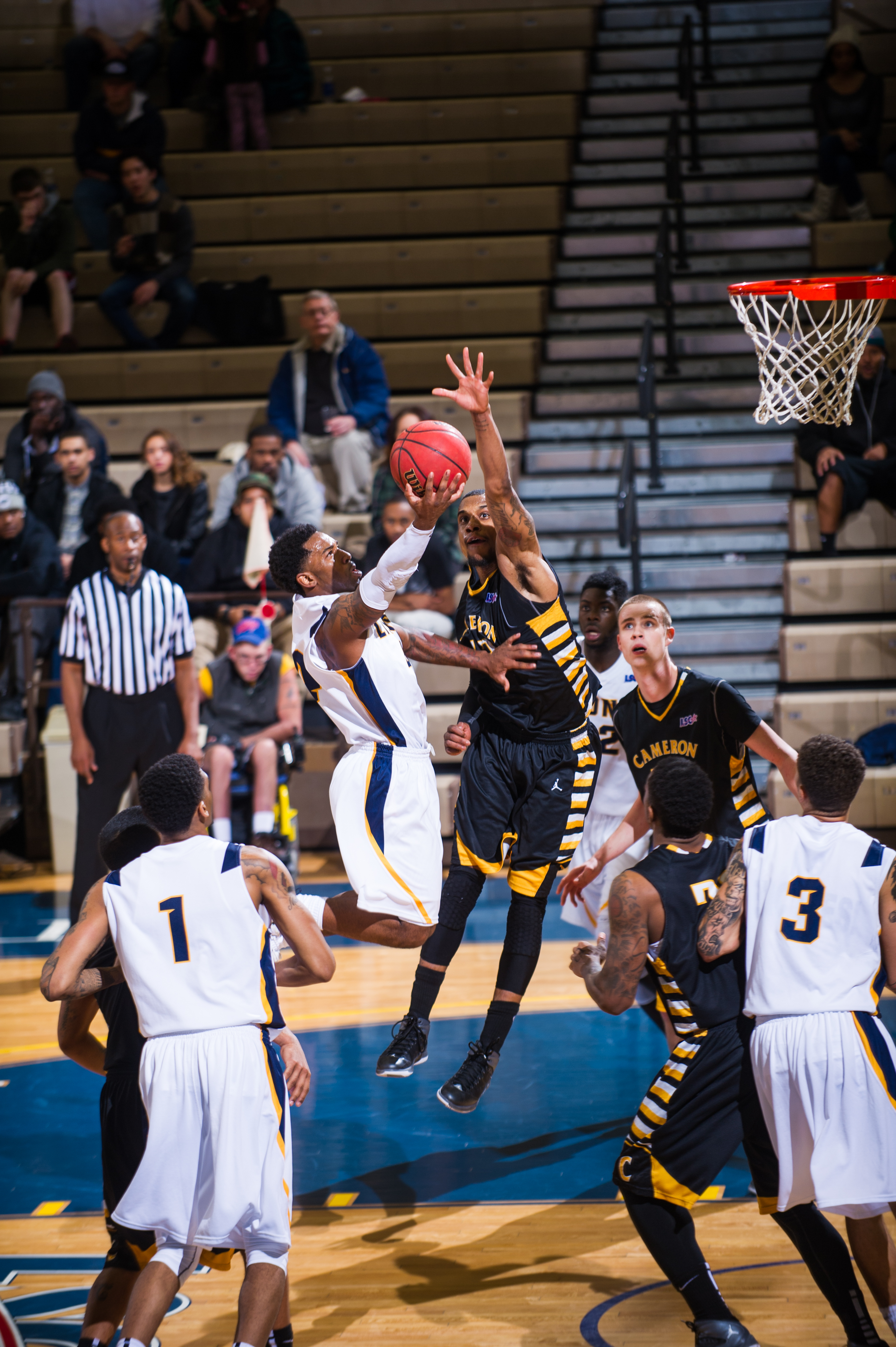
The Aggies men's basketball team in action against Texas A&M–Commerce in 2014

In the 1970s, as an NAIA Division I basketball program, the Aggies won three District IX Championships, as well as the 1980 NAIA men's basketball championship. This was the first national championship for Cameron athletics.

=== Football ===
In 1987, Cameron defeated Carson–Newman (Tenn.) 30–2 to win the NAIA Division I Football National Championship. Cameron had previously won a national championship as a junior college in 1961 as well, but the university discontinued football on December 11, 1992.

=== Men's golf ===
Jerry Hrnciar has been the head coach of the men's golf program since 1975, and his teams have appeared in the NAIA National Championship Tournament in 1977, 1978, 1982, 1983 (National Champion), 1984, 1985, 1986, and 1987. After Cameron University made the switch to NCAA Division II, Hrnciar's teams have qualified in 1990, 1991, 1994, 1996, 1998, 2001, 2002, 2006, 2007, 2010, and 2011.

=== Women's basketball ===
The women's basketball program has been in place since 1910. In 2002, the team won the Lone Star Conference championship, led by guard Kelsi Musick.

Head coaches

- CE Hansen (1910–1911)
- GL Hawkinson (1913–1914)
- Robert M. Park (1920–1921)
- BF Jolly (1921–1922)
- Thomas James Crouch (1922–1923)
- GV Dennis (1924–1927)
- EC Reynolds (1927–1928)
- William Huff (1928–1929)
- Oma Carter (1929–1930)
- Lena Japp (1930–1931)
- Lyle Yarborough (1943–1946)
- Val Maples (1958–1978)
- RT Toma (1978–1986)
- Billy Carter (1986–1989)
- Laina McDonald (1989–1997)
- Stacy Johnson (1997–2000)
- Adrian Wiggins (2000–2002)
- Dick Halterman (2002–2006)
- Kevin Kackerott (2006–2007)
- Tom Webb (2007–16)
- Emma Andrews (2016– )
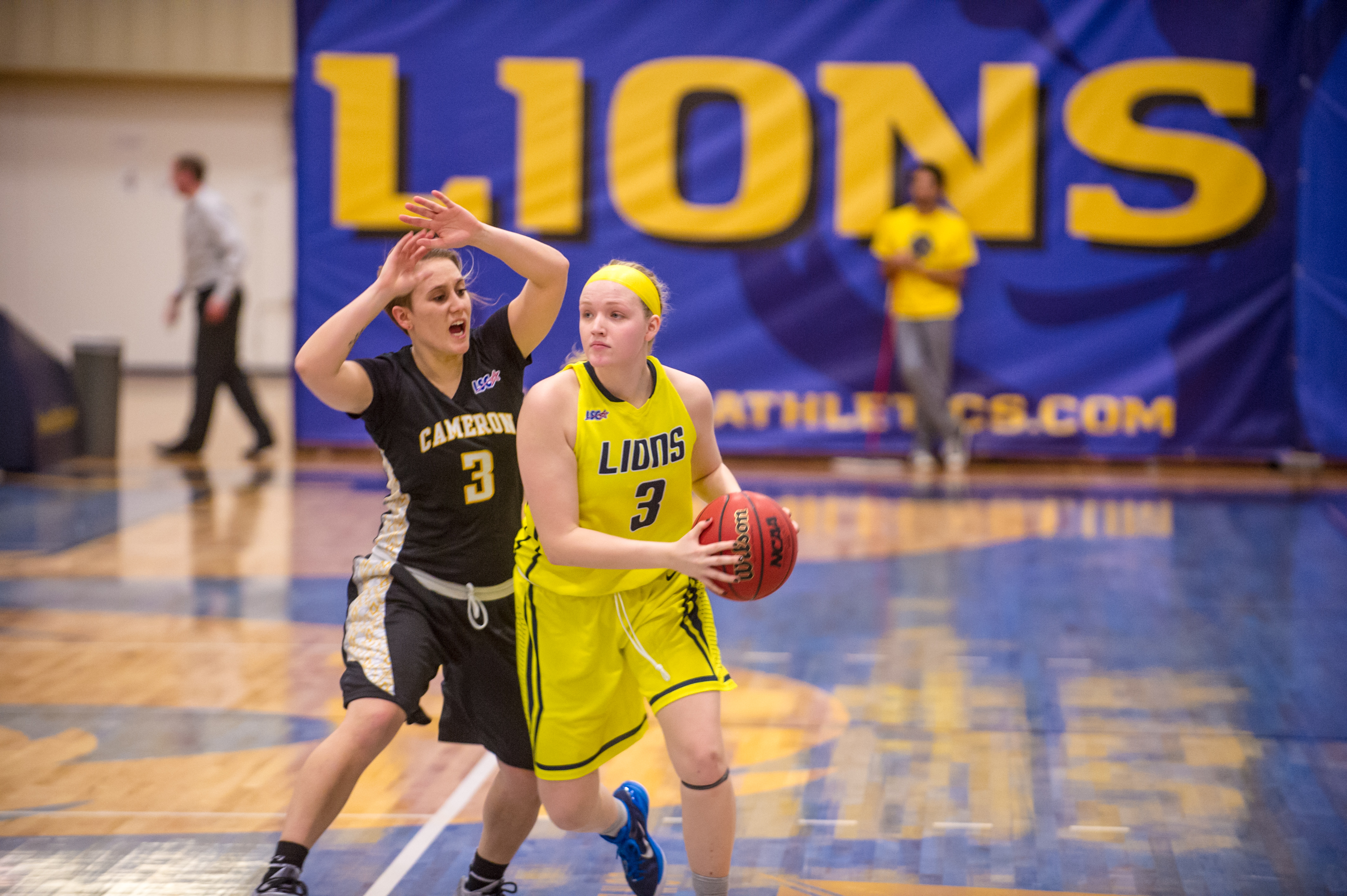
The Aggies women's basketball team in action against the Texas A&M–Commerce Lions in 2015

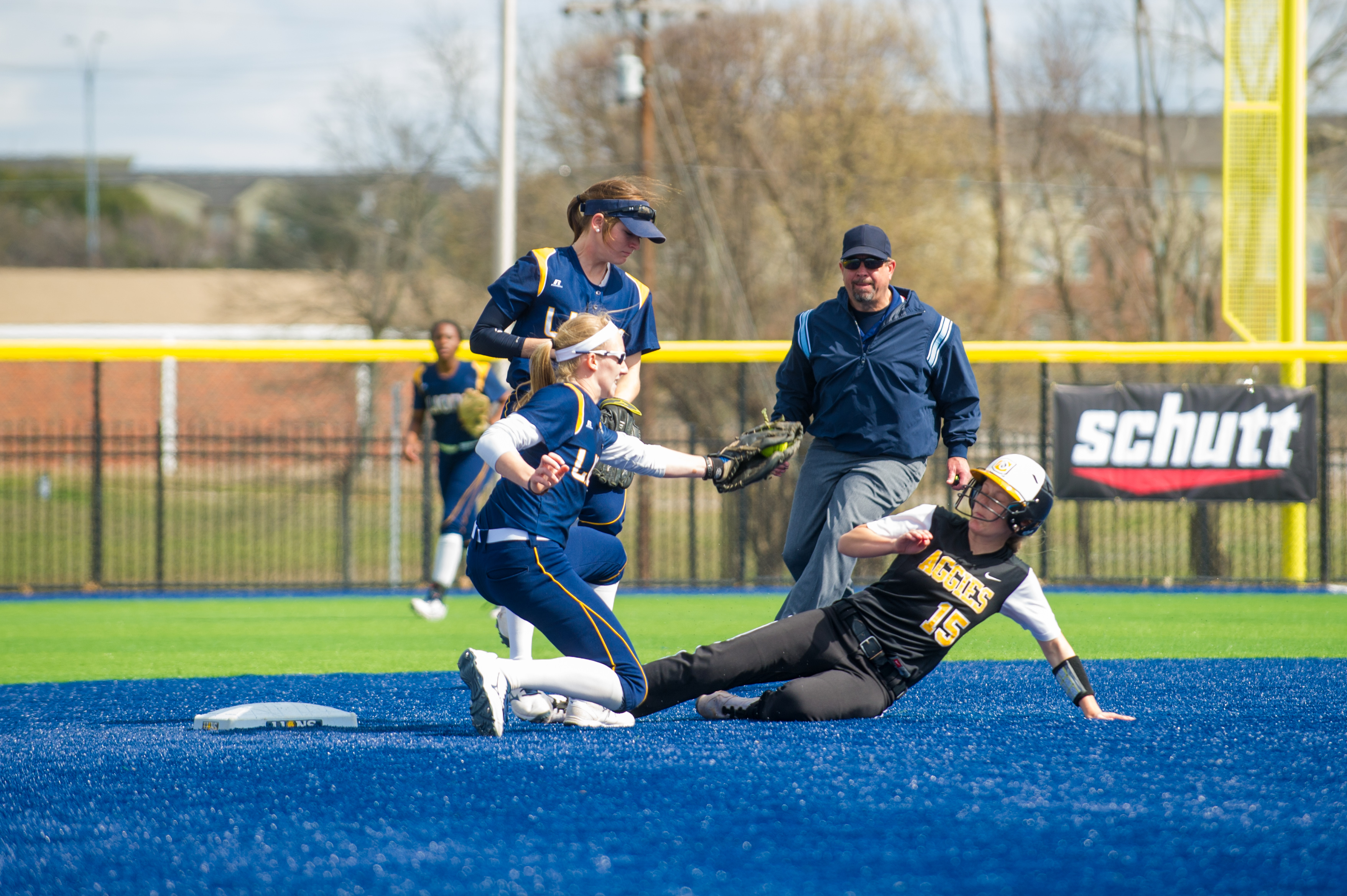
The Aggies softball team in action against Texas A&M–Commerce in 2015
