= Brian Naber =

American football player and coach (born 1949)

Biographical details
- Born: February 7, 1949 (age 77)

Playing career
- c. 1970: Concordia (NE)

Coaching career (HC unless noted)
- 1981–1983: Doane
- 1984–1989: Cameron

Head coaching record
- Overall: 54–40–2
- Tournaments: 6–1 (NAIA D-I playoffs)

Accomplishments and honors

Championships
- 1 NAIA Division I (1987); 1 NIAC (1983)

Brian Naber (born February 7, 1949) is an American former football coach. He served as the head football coach at Doane College from 1981 to 1983 and at Cameron University from 1984 to 1989, compiling a career college football record of 54–40–2.

== Coaching career ==
Naber was the 30th head football coach at Doane College in Crete, Nebraska and he held that position for three seasons, from 1981 until 1983. His coaching record at Doane was 16–14. Naber also took his Cameron team to the NAIA Championship game in 1986 and 1987, winning the national title on December 13, 1987, with a 30–2 thrashing of Carson–Newman at Cameron's home stadium in Lawton, Oklahoma.

== Head coaching record ==
Year	Team	Overall	Conference	Standing	Bowl/playoffs
Doane Tigers (Nebraska Intercollegiate Athletic Conference) (1981–1983)
1981	Doane	2–7	2–3	4th	
1982	Doane	7–4	3–2	T–2nd	
1983	Doane	7–3	4–1	T–1st	
Doane:		16–14	9–6		
Cameron Aggies (NAIA Division I independent) (1984–1987)
1984	Cameron	5–5			
1985	Cameron	3–7			
1986	Cameron	11–2–1			L NAIA Division I Championship
1987	Cameron	11–2			W NAIA Division I Championship
Cameron Aggies (Lone Star Conference) (1988–1989)
1988	Cameron	5–3–1	4–3	T–4th	
1989	Cameron	3–7	2–5	T–5th	
Cameron:		38–26–2	6–8		
Total:		54–40–2			
National championship Conference title Conference division title or championship game berth
