= C. J. Richardson =

C. J. Richardson may refer to:

- C. J. Richardson (American football), American football defensive back
- Charles James Richardson, English architect, artist and writer
