= Halterman =

Halterman is a surname. Notable people with the surname include:

- Aaron Halterman (born 1982), American football player
- Dick Halterman (born 1947), American women's basketball coach
- Frederick Halterman (1831–1907), German-American politician
