= Spruce High School =

Spruce High School may refer to:

- Spruce Creek High School, Port Orange, Florida
- H. Grady Spruce High School, Dallas, Texas
