= Leroy Montgomery =

American college football coach (1928–1993)

Biographical details
- Born: March 1, 1928; Lawton, Oklahoma, U.S.
- Died: October 26, 1993 (aged 65); Plano, Texas, U.S.

Playing career
- 1946–1947: Cameron
- 1948–1949: Hardin
- Position: End

Coaching career (HC unless noted)
- 1950–1952: Lawton HS (OK)
- 1953–1954: Cameron (assistant)
- 1955–1963: Cameron
- 1965–1966: Dodge City
- 1967–1971: Kansas State (assistant)
- 1972–1973: Winnipeg Blue Bombers (assistant)
- 1974–1976: Arkansas (recruiting)

Administrative career (AD unless noted)
- 1955–1965: Cameron

Head coaching record
- Overall: 57–23–1 (junior college)
- Bowls: 1–1 (junior college)

Accomplishments and honors

Championships
- 2 junior college national (1960–1961); 2 OJCC (1960–1961)

Leroy Montgomery (March 1, 1928 – October 26, 1993) was an American gridiron football coach, scout, and college athletics administrator. He served as the head football coach at Cameron State Agricultural College—now known as Cameron University—in Lawton, Oklahoma from 1955 to 1963 and Dodge City Community College in Dodge City, Kansas from 1965 to 1966. He led the Cameron Aggies to consecutive junior college football national championships, in 1960 and 1961.

Montgomery attended Lawton High School and then played football for two seasons at Cameron, in 1946 and 1947, before transferring to Hardin College—now known as Midwestern State University—in Wichita Falls, Texas. At Hardin, he played football on teams coached by Billy Stamps. After earning a Bachelor of Science degree from Hardin, Montgomery returned to Lawton High School as an assistant football coach under Glenn Dosser. He was hired as an assistant football coach under Jess Thompson at Cameron in 1953 and Thompson as head football coach in 1955. Montgomery was also the athletic director at Cameron from 1955 until his resignation in 1964.

After a year away from coaching, during which time Montgomery worked for Bill Smith Realty in Lawton, he was appointed head football coach at Dodge City Community College. Two years later, Montgomery was hired as an assistant football coach at Kansas State University under head coach Vince Gibson. In 1972, he was hired as an assistant for the Winnipeg Blue Bombers of the Canadian Football League (CFL) under head coach Jim Spavital. In late 1973, he returned to college football in the United States as director of recruiting at the University of Arkansas. Following Gibson's resignation at Kansas State in 1974, Montgomery was a candidate to succeed him as head football coach. In 1977, he resigned from Arkansas to take a job with United Scouting, a scouting service for the National Football League (NFL).

Montgomery was born on March 1, 1928, in Lawton. He married Dororthy Fay Sewell of Iowa Park, Texas on November 3, 1948, in Lawton. The two were both students at Hardin at the time. The couple had three children: Patty, Monte Ray, and Mike, who played college football at Kansas State and professionally in the NFL. Montgomery died on October 26, 1993, at his home in Plano, Texas.

== Head coaching record ==
=== Junior college ===
Year	Team	Overall	Conference	Standing	Bowl/playoffs
Cameron Aggies (Oklahoma Junior College Conference) (1955–1956)
1955	Cameron	9–1	5–0	2nd	
1956	Cameron	5–5	4–1	T–2nd	
Cameron Aggies (Pioneer Conference) (1957–1959)
1957	Cameron	8–4	3–1	2nd	L Industrial Bowl
1958	Cameron	4–6	2–4	T–4th	
1959	Cameron	4–5	2–3	4th	
Cameron Aggies (Oklahoma Junior College Conference) (1960–1961)
1960	Cameron	9–1	5–0	1st	
1961	Cameron	11–0	5–0	1st	W Junior Rose Bowl
Cameron Aggies (Independent) (1962–1963)
1962	Cameron	7–2			
1963	Cameron	8–2			
Cameron:		65–26	26–9		
Dodge City Conquistadors (Kansas Jayhawk Junior College Conference) (1965–1966)
1965	Dodge City	3–6–1	3–5	T–5th	
1966	Dodge City	6–3–1	5–2–1	T–2nd	
Dodge City:		9–9–2	8–7–1		
Total:		74–35–1			
National championship Conference title Conference division title or championship game berth
