= 1987 Central State Marauders football team =

American college football season

1987 Central State Marauders football

Black college national champion

NAIA Division I First Round, L 13–26 vs. Carson–Newman
- Conference: Independent
- Record: 10–1–1
- Head coach: Billy Joe (7th season)
- Home stadium: McPherson Stadium; Welcome Stadium

1987 NAIA Division I independents football records
	Conf.			Overall
Team	W	L	T	W		L		T
No. 3 Central State (OH) ^		–		10	–	1	–	1
No. 7 Cameron ^		–		11	–	2	–	0
No. 23 Arkansas–Pine Bluff		–		7	–	4	–	0
West Virginia Wesleyan		–		6	–	4	–	0
Central State (OK)		–		2	–	8	–	0
Guilford		–		2	–	8	–	0
Wofford		–		1	–	10	–	0
Langston		–		0	–	10	–	0
^ – NAIA Division I playoff participant; Rankings from NAIA Division I poll

The 1987 Central State Marauders football team represented Central State University as an independent during the 1987 NAIA Division I football season. Led by seventh-year head coach Billy Joe, the Marauders compiled an overall record of 10–1–1. At the conclusion of the season, the Marauders were also recognized as black college national champion.

== Schedule ==
Date	Opponent	Site	Result	Attendance	Source
September 5	at Kentucky State	Alumni Field; Frankfort, KY	W 21–0		
September 12	vs. Grambling State	Yankee Stadium; Bronx, NY (Whitney Young Memorial Classic)	W 37–21	29,411	
September 19	Saginaw Valley State	Welcome Stadium; Dayton, OH	W 27–17	6,000	
September 26	Grand Valley State	McPherson Stadium; Wilberforce, OH	W 25–23	4,500	
October 3	vs. Tennessee State	Hoosier Dome; Indianapolis, IN (Circle City Classic)	W 31–28	47,415	
October 10	vs. Hampton	Milwaukee County Stadium; Milwaukee, WI (Midwest Classic)	W 80–13	5,000	
October 17	vs. Florida A&M	Miami Orange Bowl; Miami, FL (Orange Blossom Classic)	T 10–10	20,439	
October 24	at Fort Valley State	International City Stadium; Warner Robins, GA (International City Classic)	W 23–8	8,000	
October 31	Hillsdale	Welcome Stadium; Dayton, OH	W 51–14	6,500	
November 7	at Winston-Salem State	Bowman Gray Stadium; Winston-Salem, NC	W 36–14	7,500	
November 14	at Northeast Missouri State	Stokes Stadium; Kirksville, MO	W 28–12		
November 27	Carson–Newman	Welcome Stadium; Dayton, OH (NAIA Division I First Round)	L 13–26		
