= Oklahoma Christian College (1907–1931) =

Private Christian college in Cordell, Oklahoma, United States

Oklahoma Christian College (OCC) was a private Christian college located in Cordell, Oklahoma. It opened in 1907 and closed permanently in 1931. The school was known as Cordell Christian College as its founding in 1907. When it reopened in 1921, after a three-year hiatus, it was called Western Oklahoma Christian College. The school dropped "Western" from its name in 1925.

Cordell Christian College acquired half a section of land north of the town of Cordell in late 1906. J. H. Lawton, of Denton, Texas, was appointed the first president of the college in 1907.

Oklahoma Christian College's sports teams were known as the Mustangs. OCC became a member of the Oklahoma Junior College Conference (OJCC) in 1926.
