= Cedric Bonner =

American football player (born 1978)

Profile
- Position: Wide receiver

Personal information
- Born: December 14, 1978 (age 47); Dallas, Texas
- Listed height: 5 ft 11 in (1.80 m)
- Listed weight: 181 lb (82 kg)

Career information
- High school: Dallas (TX) Spruce
- College: Texas A&M–Commerce
- NFL draft: 2003: undrafted

Career history

Playing
- Buffalo Bills (2003-2004)*; Oakland Raiders (2004)*; Atlanta Falcons (2005); Rhein Fire (2005–2006); Washington Redskins (2007)*; Toronto Argonauts (2008)*
- * Offseason or practice squad member only

Coaching
- Kansas City (KS) Schlagle (2009) Offensive coordinator; Overland Park (KS) Blue Valley Wide receivers coach

Cedric Bonner (born December 14, 1978) is an American former football wide receiver in the National Football League, his last team being the Washington Redskins. A 1997 graduate of H. Grady Spruce High School, He played college football for Texas A&M University-Commerce.

On March 20, 2008, Bonner signed with the Toronto Argonauts of the Canadian Football League, but was later cut in training camp on June 5, 2008.

Bonner has recently begun to coach high school football. In 2009, he signed on as the offensive coordinator at F. L. Schlagle High School in Kansas City, Kansas. Currently he is serving as the wide receiver coach at Blue Valley High School in Stilwell, Kansas.
