= Rufus Johnson (American football) =

American football player (born 1990)

No. 59
- Position: Defensive end

Personal information
- Born: August 28, 1990 (age 36); Dallas, Texas, U.S.
- Listed height: 6 ft 5 in (1.96 m)
- Listed weight: 280 lb (127 kg)

Career information
- High school: Grady Spruce (Dallas)
- College: Kilgore (2008–2010); Tarleton State (2011–2012)
- NFL draft: 2013: 6th round, 183rd overall pick

Career history
- New Orleans Saints (2013); New England Patriots (2015); Washington Redskins (2016–2017)*; Oakland Raiders (2017)*
- * Offseason or practice squad member only

Career NFL statistics
- Total tackles: 1
- Stats at Pro Football Reference

Rufus Johnson (born August 28, 1990) is an American former professional football player who was a defensive end in the National Football League (NFL). He was selected by the New Orleans Saints in the sixth round of the 2013 NFL draft. He played college football for the Tarleton State Texans.

== College career ==
Johnson is only the fourth player from Tarleton State University to be drafted by the NFL, and as the 183rd overall pick he is the highest NFL draft pick in school history. As a senior, he was Lone Star Conference defensive lineman of the year, and was chosen for several Division II all-America teams. Before Tarleton, he spent two years at Kilgore College. He caught the Saints' attention with a strong performance at the Texas vs The Nation all-star game.

== Professional career ==
=== New Orleans Saints ===
Johnson spent the entire 2013 regular season on the Saints practice squad, but was promoted for the teams divisional round playoff matchup against the Seattle Seahawks, Johnson was inactive for the game. The Saints released Johnson on August 26, 2014.

=== New England Patriots ===
On December 31, 2014, the New England Patriots signed Johnson to a future/reserve contract. After impressing many in the preseason Johnson made the Patriots 53-man roster for the start of the 2015 NFL season, he appeared in his first game as a pro and recorded his first tackle in the Patriots week two victory against Buffalo. On October 28, 2015, he was placed on the reserve/non-football injury list due to an illness, ending his 2015 season.

On September 3, 2016, Johnson was released by the Patriots as part of final roster cuts and was signed to the practice squad the next day. On September 7, 2016, Johnson was released from the Patriots' practice squad.

=== Washington Redskins ===
Johnson signed to the Redskins' practice squad on December 28, 2016. He signed a futures contract with the Redskins on January 2, 2017.

On May 2, 2017, Johnson was waived by the Redskins.

=== Oakland Raiders ===
On August 4, 2017, Johnson was signed by the Oakland Raiders. He was waived on September 2, 2017.
