= Cameron Aggies football =

- First season: 1909
- Last season: 1992
- Stadium: Cameron Stadium
- Location: Lawton, Oklahoma

NAIA national championships
- NAIA Division I: 1987
- Colors: Black and gold
- Website: Cameron Aggies

The Cameron Aggies football team represented Cameron University, located in Lawton, Oklahoma, in college football competition.

Originally established in 1909, university leadership voted to discontinue the Aggie football program on December 11, 1992.

== History ==
=== Conferences ===
- 1926–1969: Oklahoma Junior College Conference
- 1970–1973: Oklahoma Collegiate Conference
- 1974–1987: Independent
- 1988–1992: Lone Star Conference

== Championships ==
=== National championships ===
Year	Association	Division	Head coach	Record	Opponent	Result
1961	NJCAA (1)	Single (1)	Leroy Montgomery	11–0 (5–0 OJCC)	Bakersfield	W, 28–20
1987	NAIA (1)	Division I (1)	Brian Naber	11–2	Carson–Newman	W, 30–2

== Postseason appearances ==
=== NAIA playoffs ===
The Aggies made four appearances in the NAIA playoffs, with a combined record of 7–2 and one national championship.

Year	Round	Opponent	Result
1974	Semifinals	Texas A&I	L, 18–21
1981	Quarterfinals	Central Arkansas	W, 48–21 †
1986	Quarterfinals; Semifinals; National Championship	Central Arkansas; Pittsburg State; Carson–Newman	W, 35–34 (OT); W, 17–6; L, 0–17
1987	First Round; Quarterfinals; Semifinals; National Championship	Emporia State; Central Arkansas; Pittsburg State; Carson–Newman	W, 17–12; W, 14–7; W, 20–10; W, 30–2

- † Disqualified after their first round win after it was discovered they had been using ineligible players.
