= Tom Webb =

American basketball coach

Tom Webb is an American collegiate women's basketball coach, and since 2016, the head coach of the Southwest Minnesota State Mustangs women's basketball program. Prior to his tenure at Southwest Minnesota State University, he served as the head coach of the Cameron Aggies women's basketball program from 2007 to 2016. In 9 seasons as head coach at Southwest Minnesota State University, he posted a 91-123 record, after taking over a program which had won just 8 games in the prior two seasons.
