= H. Grady Spruce High School =

H Grady Spruce High School

Location
- 9733 Old Seagoville Road; Dallas, Texas 75217; United States; 32°42′31″N 96°39′16″W

Information
- Type: Public, secondary
- School district: Dallas Independent School District
- Area trustee: Nancy Bingham
- Principal: Francine Taylor
- Faculty: 130 (2018)
- Grades: 9–12
- Enrollment: 1,460 (2023–2024)
- Colors: Scarlet Red and Royal Blue
- Mascot: Timberwolves (Originally the Apaches)
- Website: www.dallasisd.org/spruce

H. Grady Spruce High School is a public school in the Spruce Square Development of Southeast Dallas in the state of Texas. H. Grady Spruce High School, which covers grades 9–12, is a part of the Dallas Independent School District. Spruce serves several sections of southeast Dallas, including Balch Springs. In 2015, the school was rated "Met Standard" by the Texas Education Agency.

== History ==
Once part of Rylie, this unincorporated land was annexed to Dallas in the late '50s and developed into a community most noted for its high school, H. Grady Spruce, which opened in 1963. Spruce replaced Rylie High School (which was turned into a junior high school and later a middle school in 1972).

The school is named for Henry Grady Spruce, a native of Omen, Texas, who earned degrees from Southern Methodist University and the University of Chicago. He devoted much of his 35-year YMCA career to youth, including 25 years as director of the Dallas YMCA's Camp Crockett (now Camp Grady Spruce) near Granbury and the Park Cities YMCA.

When it opened, Spruce's student body reflected the community and was predominantly Caucasian (white and with some black students and other ethnic groups). Beginning in 1971, Spruce was selected to take part in busing. Black students became a majority in the early 1980s as the demographics of the Pleasant Grove area changed. Starting in the 1990s, Hispanics became the majority.

From 1963–1998, the mascot of Spruce High School was the "Mighty Fighting Apaches". In 1998, the "Apache" mascot was changed to the Timberwolves.

On June 26, 2008, the Dallas ISD board voted to move all 10th and 11th graders from Spruce High School and released all staff from their contracts. As a result, Spruce disbanded all athletic teams during the 2008–2009 school year; thus, seniors who participated in athletics were eligible to transfer to other DISD schools.

== Facilities ==
Previously the school housed the Dallas ISD and Parkland Spruce Youth and Family Health Center in temporary buildings. On June 3, 2013, it moved to a site next to Balch Springs Middle School in Balch Springs and became the Balch Springs Youth & Family Health Center. It serves disadvantaged children who do not have primary care physicians.

== Statistics ==
During the 2011–12 school year 90% of the students at H. Grady Spruce High School are economically disadvantaged, 12.9% enroll in special education, 6.7% enroll in gifted and talented programs, and 27.1% are considered "limited English proficient."

The ethnic makeup of the school during the 2011-2012 school year was 71% Hispanic, 26.9% Black, 1.5% White, non-Hispanic, less than 1% Asian/Pacific Islander, and less than 1% American Indian/Alaskan Native.

== Feeder patterns ==
As of 2007, E. B. Comstock Middle School feeds into H. Grady Spruce High School.

The following elementary schools feed into Comstock and Spruce

- Balch Spring
- William M. Anderson
- W. A. Blair
- Rufus C. Burleson
- Gilbert Cuellar Sr.
- Julius Dorsey
- Frederick Douglass
- Henry B. Gonzalez
- Richard Lagow
- B. H. Macon
- Nancy Moseley

== Athletics ==
The H.Grady Spruce Timberwolves compete in the following sports:

- Baseball
- Basketball
- Cross Country
- Football
- Golf
- Soccer
- Softball
- Swimming and Diving
- Tennis
- Track and Field
- Volleyball
- Wrestling

== Notable alumni ==
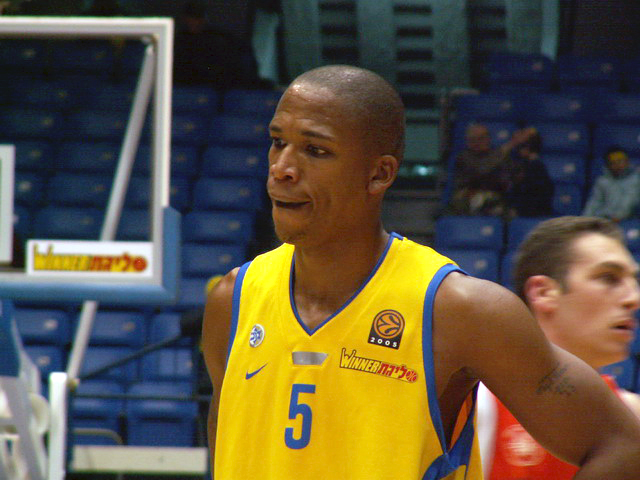
Maceo Demond Baston

- Rufus Johnson, outside linebacker for the New Orleans Saints
- Steve Rhodes (1976) Former NFL Wide Receiver for the Saint Louis Cardinals Football Team. Rhodes was drafted by out of the University of Oklahoma in the fourth round of the 1981 NFL Draft 1981 NFL draft
- Gregory K. Riggen (1978) – Former District Superintendent, Kansas District United Pentecostal Church; Pastor, New Life Pentecostal Church of Olathe, Kansas (1986–Present)
- Jitter Fields (1980) – Former Saints, Saskatchewan Roughriders, Colts and Chiefs return specialist (1984=1987); played for UT
- Charles Washington (1984) – Former NFL defensive back for the Colts, Chiefs, and Falcons
- Stevin Smith (1990) – Former Dallas Mavericks (1997) guard
- C. J. Richardson (1991) – Former Arizona Cardinals safety (1995); played collegiately at Miami
- Maceo Baston (1994) – Toronto Raptors forward; played basketball at Michigan
- Cedric Bonner (football player) (1997) – Former NFL Atlanta Falcons (2005) receiver
