= Dick Halterman =

Biographical details
- Born: April 28, 1947 (age 79)

Coaching career (HC unless noted)
- 1983–2002: Oklahoma State
- 2002–2006: Cameron

Head coaching record
- Overall: 385–290 (.570)

Accomplishments and honors

Championships
- 1 Big Eight (1990)

Dick Halterman (born April 28, 1947) is a former American collegiate women's basketball coach. He is best known as the head coach of the Oklahoma State Cowgirls basketball program from 1983 to 2001. In 19 seasons as head coach, he posted a 350-244 (.589) record. After his tenure at Oklahoma State, he served as the head coach for the Cameron Aggies women's basketball program from 2002 to 2006.

== Head coaching record ==
Record table
Season	Team	Overall	Conference	Standing	Postseason
Oklahoma State Cowgirls (Big Eight Conference) (1983–1996)
1983–84	Oklahoma State	18–11	8–6	T–3rd	
1984–85	Oklahoma State	17–11	9–5	T–3rd	
1985–86	Oklahoma State	13–18	2–12	8th	
1986–87	Oklahoma State	16–12	7–7	5th	
1987–88	Oklahoma State	17–11	7–7	T–5th	
1988–89	Oklahoma State	20–12	8–6	2nd	NCAA Second Round
1989–90	Oklahoma State	20–11	9–5	T–4th	NCAA First Round
1990–91	Oklahoma State	27–6	11–3	1st	NCAA Sweet 16
1991–92	Oklahoma State	11–17	6–8	6th	
1992–93	Oklahoma State	23–9	9–5	T–3rd	NCAA First Round
1993–94	Oklahoma State	20–9	9–5	3rd	NCAA First Round
1994–95	Oklahoma State	17–12	7–7	4th	NCAA First Round
1995–96	Oklahoma State	20–10	8–6	T–3rd	NCAA Second Round
Oklahoma State Cowgirls (Big 12 Conference) (1996–2002)
1996–97	Oklahoma State	15–12	7–9	T–8th	
1997–98	Oklahoma State	20–11	10–6	T–5th	WNIT Second Round
1998–99	Oklahoma State	13–15	4–12	11th	
1999–2000	Oklahoma State	14–16	5–11	9th	
2000–01	Oklahoma State	16–15	6–10	8th	WNIT Quarterfinals
2001–02	Oklahoma State	16–15	7–9	8th	
Oklahoma State:		350–244 (.589)			
Cameron Aggies (Lone Star Conference) (2002–2006)
2002–03	Cameron	11–15	5–7		
2003–04	Cameron	15–13	8–4		
2004–05	Cameron	11–15	5–3		
2005–06	Cameron	15–13	6–6		
Cameron:		52–57 (.477)	24–20 (.545)		
Total:		385–290 (.570)			
National champion Postseason invitational champion Conference regular season champion Conference regular season and conference tournament champion Division regular season champion Division regular season and conference tournament champion Conference tournament champion
