= 1961 Cameron Aggies football team =

American college football season

1961 Cameron Aggies football

Junior college national champion Junior Rose Bowl champion

Junior Rose Bowl, W 28–20 vs. Bakersfield
- Conference: Oklahoma Junior College Conference
- Record: 11–0 (5–0 OJCC)
- Head coach: Leroy Montgomery (7th season)
- Home stadium: Ron Stephens Stadium

1961 Oklahoma Junior College Conference football standings
| | Conf. | | | | | Overall |
| Team | W | | L | | T | W | | L | | T |
|---|---|---|---|---|---|---|---|---|---|---|
| Cameron $ | 5 | – | 0 | – | 0 | 11 | – | 0 | – | 0 |
| NE Oklahoma A&M | 4 | – | 1 | – | 0 | 7 | – | 3 | – | 0 |
| Eastern Oklahoma A&M | 4 | – | 3 | – | 0 | 6 | – | 4 | – | 0 |
| Northern Oklahoma | 2 | – | 2 | – | 1 | 5 | – | 5 | – | 1 |
| Murray State (OK) | 2 | – | 4 | – | 1 | 2 | – | 6 | – | 1 |
| Connors | 0 | – | 7 | – | 0 | 0 | – | 8 | – | 0 |
$ – Conference champion

The 1961 Cameron Aggies football team was an American football team that represented Cameron State Agricultural College, sometimes referred to as Cameron College (later renamed Cameron University) during the 1961 junior college football season. In their seventh year under head coach Leroy Montgomery, the Aggies compiled a perfect 11–0 record, defeated the Bakersfield Renegades in the Junior Rose Bowl, and were selected as the junior college national champion in the final JC Gridwire poll of 1961.

Halfback Bob Kelly was selected as a first-team player on the 1961 junior college All-American football team. Center Dave Woodward was named to the second team and tackle Jim Poole to the third team. Quarterback Billy Harper, end Ulysses Kendall, and tackle Jerry Wade received honorable mention. Six Cameron players were selected as first-team players on the 1961 Oklahoma junior college all-star team: backs Joe Don Looney, Billy Harper, and Bob Kelly; center Dave Woodward; tackle James Poole; and defensive tackle Jerry Wade.

Kelly led the team during the regular season with 712 rushing yards and 11 touchdowns on 134 carries, an average of 5.3 yards per carry. Looney placed second with 531 yards and 10 touchdowns on 109 carries for an average of 5.8 yards per carry. Looney also punted for Cameron, averaging 38.6 yards on 17 punts. Harper led the team in passing, completing 26 of 56 attempts for 538 yards, nine touchdowns, and three interceptions. Ulysses Kendall was the leading receiver with 12 receptions for 336 yards and four touchdowns.

Looney went on to win All-American honors for the 1962 Oklahoma Sooners football team and played six years in the National Football League.

The team played its home games at Ron Stephens Stadium in Lawton, Oklahoma.

== Schedule ==
| Date | Opponent | Site | Result | Attendance | Source |
|---|---|---|---|---|---|
| September 9 | Dodge City* | Ron Stephens Stadium; Lawton, OK | W 20–14 | 3,500 | |
| September 16 | Trinidad* | Ron Stephens Stadium; Lawton, OK | W 25–6 | 3,000 | |
| September 21 | at Connors | Warner, OK | W 46–0 | | |
| October 7 | Grand Rapids*^{†} | Ron Stephens Stadium; Lawton, OK | W 28–14 | 4,000 | |
| October 21 | at New Mexico Military* | Roswell, NM | W 27–24 | 2,500 | |
| October 28 | Northern Oklahoma | Ron Stephens Stadium; Lawton, OK | W 54–0 | | |
| November 4 | at Northeastern Oklahoma A&M | Robertson Field; Miami, OK | W 39–34 | 4,000 | |
| November 10 | at Murray State (OK) | Tishomingo, OK | W 33–18 | | |
| November 13 | Eastern Oklahoma A&M | Ron Stephens Stadium; Lawton, OK | W 34–12 | 800 | |
| November 18 | at Pratt* | Pratt, KS | W 21–7 | 4,500 | |
| December 9 | Bakersfield* | Rose Bowl; Pasadena, CA (Junior Rose Bowl) | W 28–20 | 49,023 | |
*Non-conference game; ^{†}Homecoming
