= Oklahoma Junior College Conference =

Junior college athletic conference in Oklahoma

The Oklahoma Junior College Conference (OJCC) was a junior college athletic conference with member schools located in Oklahoma. The conference's charter members included Bacone University (now known as Bacone College), Cameron State School of Agriculture (now known as Cameron University), Cordell Christian College (later known as Oklahoma Christian College), Murray State School of Agriculture (now known as Murray State College), Oklahoma Military Academy (now known as Rogers State University), the Oklahoma School for the Deaf, St. Gregory's College (now known as St. Gregory's University), and Tonkawa Prep School (now known as Northern Oklahoma College).

== Yearly football standings ==
1926 Oklahoma Junior College Conference football standings
	Conf.					Overall
Team	W		L		T	W		L		T
Tonkawa Prep $	4	–	0	–	0	?	–	?	–	?
Murray Aggies	2	–	1	–	0	?	–	?	–	?
Oklahoma Christian	2	–	1	–	0	?	–	?	–	?
Oklahoma Military Academy	1	–	1	–	0	?	–	?	–	?
Bacone	1	–	2	–	0	?	–	?	–	?
Oklahoma School for the Deaf	1	–	2	–	0	?	–	?	–	?
Cameron	0	–	2	–	0	2	–	6	–	0
St. Gregory's	0	–	2	–	0	?	–	?	–	?
$ – Conference champion

1927 Oklahoma Junior College Conference football standings
	Conf.					Overall
Team	W		L		T	W		L		T
Oklahoma Military Academy $	6	–	0	–	0	?	–	?	–	?
Bacone	5	–	1	–	0	?	–	?	–	?
Cameron	4	–	1	–	1	5	–	4	–	1
Murray Aggies	3	–	2	–	1	?	–	?	–	?
Oklahoma Christian	2	–	2	–	0	?	–	?	–	?
Tonkawa Prep	1	–	5	–	0	?	–	?	–	?
Connor Aggies	0	–	2	–	0	?	–	?	–	?
St. Gregory's	0	–	3	–	0	?	–	?	–	?
Chilocco	0	–	4	–	0	?	–	?	–	?
$ – Conference champion

1928 Oklahoma Junior College Conference football standings
	Conf.					Overall
Team	W		L		T	W		L		T
Tonkawa Prep $	5	–	0	–	0	?	–	?	–	?
Wilburton	4	–	1	–	0	?	–	?	–	?
Chilocco	3	–	2	–	1	?	–	?	–	?
Murray Aggies	4	–	3	–	0	?	–	?	–	?
Cameron	3	–	3	–	0	?	–	?	–	?
Bacone	2	–	3	–	1	?	–	?	–	?
Oklahoma Military Academy	2	–	5	–	0	?	–	?	–	?
Oklahoma Christian	0	–	3	–	0	?	–	?	–	?
Connor Aggies	0	–	4	–	0	?	–	?	–	?
$ – Conference champion

1929 Oklahoma Junior College Conference football standings
	Conf.					Overall
Team	W		L		T	W		L		T
Cameron +	5	–	0	–	0	9	–	1	–	0
Northeastern Oklahoma +	4	–	0	–	1	?	–	?	–	?
Oklahoma Military Academy +	4	–	0	–	2	?	–	?	–	?
Murray Aggies	3	–	1	–	1	?	–	?	–	?
University Prep	3	–	1	–	2	?	–	?	–	?
Chilocco	1	–	4	–	0	?	–	?	–	?
Connor Aggies	1	–	4	–	0	?	–	?	–	?
Eastern Oklahoma	1	–	4	–	0	?	–	?	–	?
Oklahoma Christian	1	–	4	–	0	?	–	?	–	?
Bacone	0	–	5	–	0	?	–	?	–	?
+ – Conference co-champions

1930 Oklahoma Junior College Conference football standings
	Conf.					Overall
Team	W		L		T	W		L		T
Cameron $	6	–	0	–	0	12	–	0	–	0
Oklahoma Military Academy	6	–	1	–	0	?	–	?	–	?
Murray Aggies	4	–	1	–	0	?	–	?	–	?
Bacone	2	–	2	–	0	?	–	?	–	?
Connor Aggies	2	–	3	–	0	?	–	?	–	?
University Prep	1	–	3	–	0	?	–	?	–	?
Northeastern Oklahoma	0	–	4	–	0	?	–	?	–	?
Eastern Oklahoma	0	–	4	–	0	?	–	?	–	?
Oklahoma Christian	0	–	4	–	0	?	–	?	–	?
Chilocco	0	–	5	–	0	?	–	?	–	?
$ – Conference champion

1931 Oklahoma Junior College Conference football standings
	Conf.					Overall
Team	W		L		T	W		L		T
Bacone +	5	–	0	–	0	?	–	?	–	?
Cameron +	4	–	0	–	0	9	–	0	–	0
Murray Aggies	4	–	1	–	0	?	–	?	–	?
Oklahoma Military Academy	3	–	2	–	0	?	–	?	–	?
Chilocco	2	–	2	–	0	?	–	?	–	?
Tonkawa	2	–	4	–	0	?	–	?	–	?
Northeastern Oklahoma	1	–	3	–	0	?	–	?	–	?
Connor Aggies	0	–	4	–	1	?	–	?	–	?
Eastern Oklahoma	0	–	5	–	1	?	–	?	–	?
+ – Conference co-champions

1932 Oklahoma Junior College Conference football standings
	Conf.					Overall
Team	W		L		T	W		L		T
Cameron $	3	–	1	–	0	5	–	2	–	1
Tonkawa	1	–	1	–	1	?	–	?	–	?
Murray Aggies	2	–	1	–	2	?	–	?	–	?
Connor Aggies	0	–	2	–	2	?	–	?	–	?
Chilocco	0	–	3	–	1	?	–	?	–	?
Oklahoma Military Academy *	4	–	0	–	0	?	–	?	–	?
Northeastern Oklahoma *	2	–	0	–	1	?	–	?	–	?
Eastern Oklahoma *	1	–	3	–	1	?	–	?	–	?
$ – Conference champion; * –voluntarily disqualified for violating conference rules

1933 Oklahoma Junior College Conference football standings
	Conf.					Overall
Team	W		L		T	W		L		T
Cameron $	4	–	0	–	0	6	–	1	–	0
Murray Aggies	4	–	1	–	0	?	–	?	–	?
Northeastern Oklahoma	3	–	1	–	0	?	–	?	–	?
Oklahoma Military Academy	2	–	1	–	0	?	–	?	–	?
Tonkawa	2	–	3	–	0	?	–	?	–	?
Connor Aggies	1	–	2	–	0	?	–	?	–	?
Chilocco	1	–	3	–	0	?	–	?	–	?
Eastern Oklahoma	0	–	6	–	0	?	–	?	–	?
$ – Conference champion

1934 Oklahoma Junior College Conference football standings
	Conf.					Overall
Team	W		L		T	W		L		T
Cameron +	4	–	1	–	0	8	–	1	–	0
Murray Aggies +	4	–	1	–	0	?	–	?	–	?
Oklahoma Military Academy +	4	–	1	–	0	?	–	?	–	?
Northeastern Oklahoma	3	–	1	–	0	?	–	?	–	?
Tonkawa	2	–	2	–	0	?	–	?	–	?
Connor Aggies	2	–	3	–	0	?	–	?	–	?
Chilocco	1	–	3	–	0	?	–	?	–	?
Eastern Oklahoma	0	–	6	–	0	?	–	?	–	?
+ – Conference co-champions

1935 Oklahoma Junior College Conference football standings
	Conf.					Overall
Team	W		L		T	W		L		T
Murray Aggies +	4	–	1	–	0	?	–	?	–	?
Oklahoma Military Academy +	4	–	1	–	0	?	–	?	–	?
University Junior College +	4	–	1	–	0	?	–	?	–	?
Cameron	2	–	2	–	0	6	–	4	–	0
Eastern Oklahoma	2	–	3	–	1	?	–	?	–	?
Northeastern Oklahoma	1	–	2	–	1	?	–	?	–	?
Chilocco	1	–	3	–	0	?	–	?	–	?
Connor Aggies	0	–	5	–	0	?	–	?	–	?
+ – Conference co-champions

1936 Oklahoma Junior College Conference football standings
	Conf.					Overall
Team	W		L		T	W		L		T
Murray Aggies $	4	–	0	–	1	?	–	?	–	?
Cameron	3	–	1	–	0	6	–	3	–	1
Northeastern Oklahoma	2	–	1	–	1	?	–	?	–	?
Oklahoma Military Academy	1	–	1	–	1	?	–	?	–	?
Connor Aggies	2	–	3	–	0	?	–	?	–	?
University Junior College	1	–	3	–	1	?	–	?	–	?
Eastern Oklahoma	0	–	4	–	2	?	–	?	–	?
$ – Conference champion

1937 Oklahoma Junior College Conference football standings
	Conf.					Overall
Team	W		L		T	W		L		T
Murray Aggies $	5	–	0	–	0	?	–	?	–	?
Northeastern Oklahoma	3	–	1	–	0	?	–	?	–	?
Cameron	2	–	1	–	1	5	–	2	–	3
University Junior College	2	–	2	–	1	?	–	?	–	?
Connor Aggies	1	–	4	–	0	?	–	?	–	?
Eastern Oklahoma	0	–	5	–	0	?	–	?	–	?
$ – Conference champion

1938 Oklahoma Junior College Conference football standings
	Conf.					Overall
Team	W		L		T	W		L		T
Murray Aggies $	5	–	0	–	0	?	–	?	–	?
Cameron	4	–	1	–	0	8	–	1	–	0
Connors	3	–	2	–	0	?	–	?	–	?
Eastern Oklahoma	1	–	3	–	1	?	–	?	–	?
Northeastern Oklahoma	1	–	3	–	1	?	–	?	–	?
University Junior College	0	–	5	–	0	?	–	?	–	?
$ – Conference champion

1939 Oklahoma Junior College Conference football standings
	Conf.					Overall
Team	W		L		T	W		L		T
Cameron $	4	–	0	–	0	8	–	1	–	0
University Junior College	3	–	1	–	0	?	–	?	–	?
Murray Aggies	1	–	2	–	1	?	–	?	–	?
Connors	1	–	3	–	0	?	–	?	–	?
Eastern Oklahoma	0	–	3	–	1	?	–	?	–	?
$ – Conference champion

1941 Oklahoma Junior College Conference football standings
	Conf.					Overall
Team	W		L		T	W		L		T
Cameron $	3	–	0	–	0	8	–	2	–	1
Tonkawa	1	–	1	–	1	?	–	?	–	?
Eastern Oklahoma	1	–	2	–	0	?	–	?	–	?
Murray Aggies	0	–	2	–	1	?	–	?	–	?
$ – Conference champion

1946 Oklahoma Junior College Conference football standings
	Conf.					Overall
Team	W		L		T	W		L		T
Cameron $	6	–	0	–	0	9	–	1	–	0
Bacone	5	–	1	–	1	6	–	2	–	1
Northeastern Oklahoma	4	–	2	–	0	6	–	4	–	0
Connors	3	–	3	–	0	3	–	4	–	0
Murray Aggies	1	–	3	–	2	1	–	6	–	2
Northern Oklahoma	1	–	4	–	1	3	–	4	–	1
Oklahoma Military Academy	0	–	1	–	0	5	–	2	–	0
Eastern Oklahoma	0	–	6	–	0	0	–	9	–	0
$ – Conference champion

1947 Oklahoma Junior College Conference football standings
	Conf.					Overall
Team	W		L		T	W		L		T
Cameron *	5	–	0	–	0	10	–	1	–	0
Northeastern Oklahoma +	4	–	2	–	0	9	–	3	–	0
Connors +	4	–	2	–	0	6	–	5	–	0
Northern Oklahoma	3	–	3	–	0	4	–	5	–	0
Eastern Oklahoma	2	–	4	–	0	4	–	6	–	0
Murray Aggies	2	–	4	–	0	2	–	6	–	0
Bacone	0	–	5	–	0	0	–	7	–	0
+ – Conference co-champions; * – In January 1948, Cameron forfeited the conference title because of an ineligible player.

1948 Oklahoma Junior College Conference football standings
	Conf.					Overall
Team	W		L		T	W		L		T
Northeastern Oklahoma $	4	–	1	–	0	7	–	3	–	0
Eastern Oklahoma	3	–	1	–	1	6	–	2	–	2
Cameron	3	–	2	–	0	8	–	2	–	0
Connors	3	–	2	–	0	5	–	4	–	0
Northern Oklahoma	1	–	3	–	1	3	–	4	–	1
Murray Aggies	0	–	5	–	0	1	–	7	–	0
$ – Conference champion

1949 Oklahoma Junior College Conference football standings
	Conf.					Overall
Team	W		L		T	W		L		T
Northeastern Oklahoma $	4	–	1	–	0	7	–	3	–	0
Cameron	3	–	1	–	1	4	–	5	–	1
Eastern Oklahoma	2	–	1	–	2	4	–	3	–	2
Connors	2	–	2	–	1	5	–	2	–	1
Murray Aggies	2	–	3	–	0	4	–	5	–	0
Northern Oklahoma	0	–	5	–	0	2	–	6	–	0
$ – Conference champion

1950 Oklahoma Junior College Conference football standings
	Conf.					Overall
Team	W		L		T	W		L		T
Eastern Oklahoma $	5	–	0	–	0	7	–	3	–	0
Connors	3	–	1	–	1	7	–	1	–	1
Northeastern Oklahoma	2	–	1	–	2	3	–	4	–	2
Northern Oklahoma	2	–	3	–	0	3	–	6	–	0
Murray Aggies	1	–	3	–	1	1	–	6	–	1
Oklahoma Military Academy	0	–	5	–	0	1	–	8	–	0
$ – Conference champion

1951 Oklahoma Junior College Conference football standings
	Conf.					Overall
Team	W		L		T	W		L		T
Northeastern Oklahoma $	5	–	0	–	0	9	–	0	–	0
Bacone	4	–	1	–	0	8	–	1	–	0
Connors	3	–	2	–	0	4	–	3	–	0
Oklahoma Military Academy	2	–	3	–	0	3	–	4	–	0
Northern Oklahoma	1	–	4	–	0	1	–	5	–	1
Murray Aggies	0	–	5	–	0	0	–	7	–	0
$ – Conference champion

1953 Oklahoma Junior College Conference football standings
	Conf.					Overall
Team	W		L		T	W		L		T
NE Oklahoma A&M $	6	–	0	–	0	9	–	1	–	0
Northern Oklahoma	5	–	1	–	0	5	–	3	–	0
Bacone	4	–	2	–	0	6	–	3	–	0
Murray Aggies	3	–	3	–	0	3	–	4	–	0
Eastern Oklahoma	2	–	4	–	0	4	–	5	–	0
Connors	1	–	5	–	0	1	–	7	–	0
Oklahoma Military Academy	0	–	6	–	0	0	–	9	–	0
$ – Conference champion

1954 Oklahoma Junior College Conference football standings
	Conf.					Overall
Team	W		L		T	W		L		T
Cameron $	4	–	0	–	0	6	–	3	–	0
Northern Oklahoma	5	–	1	–	0	?	–	?	–	?
NE Oklahoma A&M	4	–	1	–	0	7	–	3	–	0
Bacone	4	–	2	–	0	?	–	?	–	?
Murray Aggies	3	–	3	–	0	?	–	?	–	?
Eastern Oklahoma	2	–	5	–	0	?	–	?	–	?
Connors	1	–	6	–	0	1	–	7	–	0
Oklahoma Military Academy	0	–	5	–	0	?	–	?	–	?
$ – Conference champion

1955 Oklahoma Junior College Conference football standings
	Conf.					Overall
Team	W		L		T	W		L		T
Northern Oklahoma $	6	–	0	–	0	?	–	?	–	?
Cameron	5	–	0	–	0	9	–	1	–	0
NE Oklahoma A&M	5	–	2	–	0	7	–	2	–	1
Eastern Oklahoma	4	–	3	–	0	?	–	?	–	?
Bacone	3	–	4	–	0	?	–	?	–	?
Connors	2	–	5	–	0	?	–	?	–	?
Murray Aggies	1	–	6	–	0	?	–	?	–	?
Oklahoma Military Academy	0	–	6	–	0	?	–	?	–	?
$ – Conference champion

1956 Oklahoma Junior College Conference football standings
	Conf.					Overall
Team	W		L		T	W		L		T
NE Oklahoma A&M $	5	–	1	–	0	5	–	3	–	1
Northern Oklahoma	4	–	1	–	0	6	–	3	–	0
Cameron	4	–	1	–	0	5	–	5	–	0
Murray Aggies	3	–	3	–	0	3	–	5	–	0
Eastern Oklahoma	2	–	4	–	0	4	–	5	–	0
Bacone	1	–	5	–	0	1	–	5	–	0
Connors	1	–	5	–	0	1	–	6	–	0
$ – Conference champion

1957 Oklahoma Junior College Conference football standings
	Conf.					Overall
Team	W		L		T	W		L		T
NE Oklahoma A&M $	4	–	0	–	0	9	–	0	–	0
Murray Aggies	4	–	1	–	0	4	–	4	–	0
Northern Oklahoma	3	–	2	–	0	7	–	3	–	0
Eastern Oklahoma	2	–	3	–	0	3	–	4	–	0
Connors	1	–	4	–	0	2	–	6	–	0
Oklahoma Military Academy	0	–	4	–	0	2	–	5	–	0
$ – Conference champion

1958 Oklahoma Junior College Conference football standings
	Conf.					Overall
Team	W		L		T	W		L		T
NE Oklahoma A&M $	4	–	0	–	0	9	–	1	–	0
Murray Aggies	3	–	1	–	0	4	–	2	–	2
Northern Oklahoma	2	–	2	–	0	6	–	4	–	0
Connors	1	–	3	–	0	3	–	4	–	1
Eastern Oklahoma	0	–	4	–	0	2	–	6	–	0
$ – Conference champion

1959 Oklahoma Junior College Conference football standings
	Conf.					Overall
Team	W		L		T	W		L		T
NE Oklahoma A&M $	4	–	0	–	0	9	–	1	–	1
Murray Aggies	3	–	1	–	0	5	–	4	–	0
Northern Oklahoma	2	–	2	–	0	6	–	4	–	0
Connors	1	–	3	–	0	?	–	?	–	?
Eastern Oklahoma	0	–	4	–	0	0	–	6	–	0
$ – Conference champion

1960 Oklahoma Junior College Conference football standings
	Conf.					Overall
Team	W		L		T	W		L		T
Cameron $	5	–	0	–	0	9	–	1	–	0
NE Oklahoma A&M	4	–	1	–	0	8	–	2	–	0
Murray State (OK)	2	–	3	–	0	6	–	3	–	0
Northern Oklahoma	2	–	3	–	0	6	–	5	–	0
Eastern Oklahoma A&M	1	–	4	–	0	3	–	6	–	0
Connors	1	–	4	–	0	1	–	8	–	0
$ – Conference champion

1961 Oklahoma Junior College Conference football standings
	Conf.					Overall
Team	W		L		T	W		L		T
Cameron $	5	–	0	–	0	11	–	0	–	0
NE Oklahoma A&M	4	–	1	–	0	7	–	3	–	0
Eastern Oklahoma A&M	4	–	3	–	0	6	–	4	–	0
Northern Oklahoma	2	–	2	–	1	5	–	5	–	1
Murray State (OK)	2	–	4	–	1	2	–	6	–	1
Connors	0	–	7	–	0	0	–	8	–	0
$ – Conference champion

1962 Oklahoma Junior College Conference football standings
	Conf.					Overall
Team	W		L		T	W		L		T
NE Oklahoma A&M $	2	–	0	–	0	8	–	1	–	1
Eastern Oklahoma A&M	4	–	2	–	0	5	–	3	–	0
Northern Oklahoma	3	–	3	–	0	3	–	6	–	0
Connors	2	–	5	–	0	2	–	7	–	0
Murray State (OK)	2	–	5	–	0	2	–	8	–	0
Cameron *	4	–	0	–	0	7	–	2	–	0
$ – Conference champion; * Cameron was ineligible for the conference title.

1963 Oklahoma Junior College Conference football standings
	Conf.					Overall
Team	W		L		T	W		L		T
Oklahoma Military Academy $	6	–	0	–	2	8	–	0	–	2
Eastern Oklahoma A&M	4	–	2	–	2	5	–	2	–	2
Northern Oklahoma	3	–	5	–	0	4	–	5	–	0
Connors	2	–	5	–	1	4	–	5	–	1
Murray State (OK)	2	–	5	–	1	2	–	7	–	1
$ – Conference champion

1964 Oklahoma Junior College Conference football standings
	Conf.					Overall
Team	W		L		T	W		L		T
Oklahoma Military Academy $	7	–	1	–	0	9	–	3	–	0
Eastern Oklahoma A&M	4	–	3	–	1	5	–	3	–	1
Northern Oklahoma	4	–	4	–	0	5	–	4	–	0
Murray State (OK)	3	–	4	–	1	3	–	5	–	1
Connors	1	–	7	–	0	3	–	7	–	0
$ – Conference champion

1965 Oklahoma Junior College Conference football standings
	Conf.					Overall
Team	W		L		T	W		L		T
Eastern Oklahoma A&M $	3	–	0	–	1	5	–	3	–	1
Murray State (OK)	2	–	1	–	1	3	–	5	–	2
Oklahoma Military Academy	2	–	2	–	0	5	–	5	–	0
Northern Oklahoma	2	–	2	–	0	3	–	5	–	0
Connors	0	–	4	–	0	0	–	10	–	0
$ – Conference champion

1966 Oklahoma Junior College Conference football standings
	Conf.					Overall
Team	W		L		T	W		L		T
Eastern Oklahoma A&M $	3	–	0	–	0	6	–	3	–	0
Connors	2	–	1	–	0	4	–	6	–	0
Murray State (OK)	1	–	2	–	0	3	–	7	–	0
Northern Oklahoma	0	–	3	–	0	1	–	9	–	0
$ – Conference champion

1967 Oklahoma Junior College Conference football standings
	Conf.					Overall
Team	W		L		T	W		L		T
NE Oklahoma A&M $	2	–	0	–	0	9	–	1	–	0
Cameron	1	–	1	–	0	5	–	5	–	0
Oklahoma Military Academy	0	–	2	–	0	1	–	9	–	0
$ – Conference champion
