= C. J. Richardson (American football) =

American football player (born 1972)

No. 29, 39
- Position: Defensive back

Personal information
- Born: June 10, 1972 (age 54); Dallas, Texas, U.S.
- Listed height: 5 ft 10 in (1.78 m)
- Listed weight: 209 lb (95 kg)

Career information
- High school: H. Grady Spruce (Dallas)
- College: Miami (FL)
- NFL draft: 1995: 7th round, 211th overall pick

Career history

Playing
- Houston Oilers (1995)*; Arizona Cardinals (1995); Seattle Seahawks (1996)*; Seattle Seahawks (1997)
- * Offseason or practice squad member only

Coaching
- H. Grady Spruce HS (2003–2008) Defensive coordinator; H. Grady Spruce HS (2009–present) Head coach

Awards and highlights
- First-team All-American (1994)
- Stats at Pro Football Reference

Carl Ray "C. J." Richardson, Jr. (born June 10, 1972) is an American former professional football player who was a defensive back for the Arizona Cardinals and Seattle Seahawks of the National Football League (NFL). He played college football for the Miami Hurricanes.

== Early life and college ==
Richardson played both baseball and football at H. Grady Spruce High School in Dallas. He earned All-State and All-American honors in football in 1989 and 1990.

Richardson originally intended to play both baseball and football at the University of Miami, but was forced to focus on football after having to battle for a starting spot at safety on the Hurricanes football team. He played three seasons with the Hurricanes from 1992–1994, being named an All-American at the end of his 1994 season.

He received a bachelor's degree in criminal justice from the university in 1995.

== Professional career ==
=== Houston Oilers ===
The Houston Oilers selected Richardson in the seventh round of the 1995 NFL draft, with the 211th pick overall. The Oilers released him on August 28, 1995.

=== Arizona Cardinals ===
On November 8, 1995, Richardson signed a one-year contract with the Arizona Cardinals. He made an appearance in the Cardinals' November 12 game against the Minnesota Vikings, but was placed on injured reserve the following day and remained there for the rest of the season.

Richardson officially became a free agent on February 15, 1996. He re-signed with the Cardinals on March 22, but was later waived by the team.

=== Seattle Seahawks ===
On June 25, 1996, Richardson was claimed off waivers by the Seattle Seahawks. He was released on August 20, and spent the 1996 season out of football.

On March 5, 1997, Richardson signed again with the Seahawks. He played 14 games with the Seahawks during their 1997 season.

Richardson retired in 1998 following multiple severe arm injuries.

== Personal life ==
Richardson is currently the head football coach and athletic coordinator at H. Grady Spruce High School. He has two children, Carl III and Krystal.
