= 1987 Cameron Aggies football team =

American college football season

1987 Cameron Aggies football

NAIA Division I national champion

NAIA Division I Championship Game, W 30–2 vs. Carson–Newman
- Conference: Independent
- Record: 11–2
- Head coach: Brian Naber (4th season)

1987 NAIA Division I independents football records
	Conf.			Overall
Team	W	L	T	W		L		T
No. 3 Central State (OH) ^		–		10	–	1	–	1
No. 7 Cameron ^		–		11	–	2	–	0
No. 23 Arkansas–Pine Bluff		–		7	–	4	–	0
West Virginia Wesleyan		–		6	–	4	–	0
Central State (OK)		–		2	–	8	–	0
Guilford		–		2	–	8	–	0
Wofford		–		1	–	10	–	0
Langston		–		0	–	10	–	0
^ – NAIA Division I playoff participant; Rankings from NAIA Division I poll

The 1987 Cameron Aggies football team was an American football team that represented Cameron University and won the national championship during the 1987 NAIA Division I football season. In their fourth season under head coach Brian Naber, the Aggies compiled an 11–2 record. They participated in the NAIA Division I playoffs, defeating Emporia State (17–12) in the first round, Central Arkansas (14–7) in the quarterfinals, Pittsburg State (20–10) in the semifinals, and Carson–Newman (30–2) in the championship game.

The team's statistical leaders included tailback Robert Whitman, quarterback Levon Davis, wide receiver Ronald Walters, and Chuck Smith.

== Schedule ==
Date	Opponent	Rank	Site	Result	Attendance	Source
September 5	at Southeastern (OK)		Paul Laird Field; Durant, OK	W 13–0		
September 12	Henderson State		Cameron Stadium; Lawton, OK	W 32–13	4,000	
September 19	Fort Hays State		Cameron Stadium; Lawton, OK	W 37–12		
September 26	vs. Abilene Christian		Arlington, TX	W 18–3	8,519	
October 3	Central State (OK)^{†}		Cameron Stadium; Lawton, OK	W 31–13	8,500	
October 10	at Elon		Elon, NC	L 20–21	3,232	
October 17	at Langston		Langston, OK	W 69–0	800	
October 24	at Texas A&I		Kingsville, TX	L 20–39		
November 7	at Texas Lutheran		Matador Stadium; Seguin, TX	W 28–10		
November 28	No. 12 Emporia State	No. 7	Cameron Stadium; Lawton, OK (NAIA Division I First Round Game)	W 17–12	3,500	
December 5	No. 2 Central Arkansas	No. 7	Cameron Stadium; Lawton, OK (NAIA Division I First Quarterfinal)	W 14–7	5,000	
December 12	at No. 1 Pittsburg State	No. 7	Pittsburg, KS (NAIA Division I First Semifinal)	W 20–10	5,500	
December 19	No. 9 Carson–Newman	No. 7	Cameron Stadium; Lawton, OK (NAIA Division I First Championship Game)	W 30–20	7,679	
^{†}Homecoming; Rankings from NAIA Division I Poll released prior to the game
