= 1987 NAIA Division I football season =

American college football season

- Regular season: August–November 1987
- Postseason: November 28–December 19, 1987
- National Championship: Cameron Stadium; Lawton, OK
- Champions: Cameron

The 1987 NAIA Division I football season was the 32nd season of college football sponsored by the NAIA, was the 18th season of play of the NAIA's top division for football.

The season was played from August to November 1987 and culminated in the 1987 NAIA Champion Bowl playoffs and the 1987 NAIA Champion Bowl, played this year on December 19, 1987 at Cameron Stadium in Lawton, Oklahoma, on the campus of Cameron University.

Cameron defeated Carson–Newman in the Champion Bowl (a re-match of the previous year's final, won by the Eagles), 30–2, to win their first NAIA national title.

== Conference realignment ==
=== Conference changes ===
- This was the final season that the NAIA officially recognized the football champion from the Central States Intercollegiate Conference (CSIC). The CSIC played one more season as part of the NAIA before disbanding.

== Conference standings ==
1987 Arkansas Intercollegiate Conference football standings
	Conf.					Overall
Team	W		L		T	W		L		T
No. 2 Central Arkansas $^	6	–	0	–	0	11	–	1	–	0
Southern Arkansas	3	–	2	–	1	5	–	4	–	1
No. 22 Harding	3	–	3	–	0	6	–	4	–	0
No. 25 Henderson State	3	–	3	–	0	5	–	5	–	0
No. 21 Arkansas–Monticello	2	–	4	–	0	6	–	4	–	0
Ouachita Baptist	2	–	4	–	0	4	–	4	–	1
Arkansas Tech	1	–	4	–	1	2	–	7	–	1
$ – Conference champion; ^ – NAIA Division I playoff participant; Rankings from NAIA Division I poll

1987 Central States Intercollegiate Conference football standings
	Conf.					Overall
Team	W		L		T	W		L		T
No. 1 Pittsburg State $^	7	–	0	–	0	11	–	1	–	0
No. 24 Washburn	5	–	2	–	0	6	–	5	–	0
No. 12 Emporia State	4	–	3	–	0	7	–	3	–	0
Kearney State	4	–	3	–	0	4	–	5	–	0
Fort Hays State	3	–	4	–	0	4	–	6	–	0
Missouri Southern	3	–	4	–	0	3	–	7	–	0
Wayne State (NE)	1	–	5	–	1	1	–	8	–	1
Missouri Western	0	–	6	–	1	1	–	9	–	1
$ – Conference champion; ^ – NAIA Division I playoff participant; Rankings from NAIA Division I poll

1987 Columbia Football League standings
	Conf.					Overall
Team	W		L		T	W		L		T
Northern Division
No. 8 Central Washington * x	5	–	1	–	0	7	–	3	–	0
No. 6 Pacific Lutheran ^	4	–	1	–	1	11	–	1	–	1
No. 17 Puget Sound	4	–	2	–	0	6	–	3	–	0
Simon Fraser	4	–	2	–	0	4	–	6	–	0
Western Washington	2	–	3	–	1	4	–	3	–	2
Whitworth	1	–	5	–	0	3	–	6	–	0
Lewis & Clark	0	–	6	–	0	0	–	9	–	0
Southern Division
Oregon Tech x	5	–	1	–	0	5	–	4	–	0
No. 15 Southern Oregon *	4	–	2	–	0	7	–	4	–	0
Linfield	4	–	2	–	0	5	–	4	–	0
Pacific (OR)	3	–	2	–	1	4	–	3	–	2
Western Oregon	3	–	3	–	0	5	–	4	–	0
Willamette	1	–	4	–	1	3	–	5	–	1
Eastern Oregon	0	–	6	–	0	1	–	8	–	0
x – Division champion/co-champions; * – NAIA Division I playoff participant ^ – NAIA Division II playoff participant; Rankings from NAIA Division I poll for Central Washington, Puget Sound, and Southern Oregon and NAIA Division II poll for Pacific Lutheran

1987 Great Lakes Intercollegiate Athletic Conference football standings
	Conf.					Overall
Team	W		L		T	W		L		T
No. 5 Northern Michigan $^	4	–	0	–	0	10	–	2	–	0
Grand Valley State	4	–	1	–	0	7	–	4	–	0
Hillsdale	2	–	3	–	0	6	–	5	–	0
Saginaw Valley State	2	–	3	–	0	5	–	5	–	0
Ferris State	2	–	3	–	0	4	–	7	–	0
Wayne State (MI)	0	–	4	–	0	4	–	6	–	0
$ – Conference champion; ^ – NCAA Division II playoff participant; Rankings from NCAA Division II Football Committee poll

1987 Northern Intercollegiate Conference football standings
	Conf.					Overall
Team	W		L		T	W		L		T
Minnesota Morris $	5	–	1	–	0	7	–	3	–	0
No. 14 Southwest State (MN)	4	–	1	–	1	7	–	4	–	1
No. 16 Moorhead State ^	4	–	2	–	0	9	–	3	–	0
Northern State	4	–	2	–	0	7	–	4	–	0
Winona State	2	–	4	–	0	3	–	8	–	0
Bemidji State	0	–	5	–	1	2	–	7	–	1
Minnesota Duluth	0	–	6	–	0	0	–	11	–	0
$ – Conference champion; ^ – NAIA Division I playoff participant Minnesota Duluth forfeited 8 wins including 5 conference wins, over Minnesota Morris, Moorhead State, Northern State, Winona State, and Bemidji State.; Rankings from NAIA Division I poll

1987 Oklahoma Intercollegiate Conference football standings
	Conf.					Overall
Team	W		L		T	W		L		T
No. 10 Northeastern State +^	3	–	1	–	0	8	–	3	–	0
East Central +	3	–	1	–	0	5	–	5	–	0
No. 13 NW Oklahoma State ^	2	–	2	–	0	7	–	4	–	0
SE Oklahoma State	2	–	2	–	0	4	–	5	–	2
SW Oklahoma State	0	–	4	–	0	3	–	7	–	0
+ – Conference co-champions; ^ – NAIA Division I playoff participant; Rankings from NAIA Division I poll

1987 Rocky Mountain Athletic Conference football standings
	Conf.					Overall
Team	W		L		T	W		L		T
No. 4 Mesa $^	6	–	0	–	0	11	–	1	–	0
Adams State *	4	–	2	–	0	5	–	6	–	0
No. 20 New Mexico Highlands	3	–	2	–	1	5	–	3	–	1
Western New Mexico	3	–	3	–	0	5	–	5	–	0
Fort Lewis	3	–	3	–	0	3	–	6	–	0
Western State (CO)	1	–	5	–	0	2	–	8	–	0
Colorado Mines	0	–	5	–	1	3	–	5	–	1
$ – Conference champion; ^ – NAIA Division I playoff participant * – Adams State forfeited three victories including a conference win over Western New Mexico; Rankings from NAIA Division I poll

1987 South Atlantic Conference football standings
	Conf.					Overall
Team	W		L		T	W		L		T
No. 6 Gardner–Webb $^	6	–	1	–	0	11	–	2	–	0
No. 11 Presbyterian ^	5	–	2	–	0	8	–	5	–	0
No. 9 Carson–Newman ^	4	–	3	–	0	10	–	4	–	0
No. 19 Elon	4	–	3	–	0	6	–	4	–	0
Lenoir–Rhyne	3	–	4	–	0	7	–	4	–	0
Newberry	3	–	4	–	0	4	–	7	–	0
Catawba	2	–	5	–	0	4	–	7	–	0
Mars Hill	1	–	6	–	0	3	–	8	–	0
$ – Conference champion; ^ – NAIA Division I playoff participant; Rankings from NAIA Division I poll

1987 West Virginia Intercollegiate Athletic Conference football standings
	Conf.					Overall
Team	W		L		T	W		L		T
No. 5 Concord $^	7	–	0	–	0	10	–	1	–	0
No. 18 Fairmont State	5	–	2	–	0	7	–	3	–	0
West Liberty State	4	–	3	–	0	6	–	4	–	0
Shepherd	3	–	4	–	0	6	–	4	–	0
Glenville State	3	–	4	–	0	4	–	5	–	1
West Virginia Tech	3	–	4	–	0	4	–	6	–	0
Salem	3	–	4	–	0	3	–	6	–	0
West Virginia State	0	–	7	–	0	0	–	10	–	0
$ – Conference champion; ^ – NAIA Division I playoff participant West Virginia State forfeited a shared of the conference title, one tie, and eight victories, including six conference wins, over Concord, Fairmont State, West Liberty, Salem, Glenville State, and West Virginia Tech.; Rankings from NAIA Division I poll

1987 NAIA Division I independents football records
	Conf.			Overall
Team	W	L	T	W		L		T
No. 3 Central State (OH) ^		–		10	–	1	–	1
No. 7 Cameron ^		–		11	–	2	–	0
No. 23 Arkansas–Pine Bluff		–		7	–	4	–	0
West Virginia Wesleyan		–		6	–	4	–	0
Central State (OK)		–		2	–	8	–	0
Guilford		–		2	–	8	–	0
Wofford		–		1	–	10	–	0
Langston		–		0	–	10	–	0
^ – NAIA Division I playoff participant; Rankings from NAIA Division I poll

== Conference champions ==
Conference	Champion	Record
Arkansas	Central Arkansas	6–0
Central States	Pittsburg State	7–0
NIC	Minnesota–Duluth	5–1
Oklahoma	Northeastern State; East Central	3–1
RMAC	Mesa	6–0
South Atlantic	Gardner–Webb	6–1
WVIAC	Concord (WV)	7–1

== Postseason ==
=== Format ===
- After nine seasons of an eight-team bracket, the tournament field expanded to sixteen. In turn, the playoffs began during the month of November for the first time since 1975.

=== Bracket ===
First Round; November 28, 1987; Campus sites
Central Washington	14
Southern Oregon*	21
Mesa	49
Southwest State (MN)*	7
Moorhead State	7
Gardner–Webb*	27
Carson–Newman	26
Central State (OH)*	13
NW Oklahoma State	7
Central Arkansas*	31
Emporia State	12
Cameron*	17
Concord	0
Presbyterian*	41
Northeastern State	0
Pittsburg State*	57

Quarterfinals; December 5, 1987; Campus sites
Southern Oregon	7
Mesa*	38
Gardner–Webb	24
Carson–Newman*	27
Central Arkansas	7
Cameron*	14
Presbyterian	21
Pittsburg State*	42

Semifinals; December 12, 1987; Campus sites
Mesa	7
Carson–Newman*	21
Cameron	20
Pittsburg State*	10

1987 Champion Bowl; December 19, 1987; Lawton, OK
Carson–Newman	2
Cameron*	30

== See also ==
- 1987 NCAA Division I-A football season
- 1987 NCAA Division I-AA football season
- 1987 NCAA Division II football season
- 1987 NCAA Division III football season
