= List of North Dakota State Bison football seasons =

North Dakota State Bison Logo

North Dakota State University first fielded a football team in 1894, among the first 70 universities in the nation to do so. The first game the North Dakota State Farmers (until adopting the Aggies mascot in 1902) played was against future rival, University of North Dakota Flickertails (until adopting the Fighting Sioux mascot in 1930), North Dakota State won the game 20–4.

North Dakota State officially joined the North Central Conference in 1922 as a founding member. It stayed a member of this conference until 2004, when it moved to Division I (FCS).

The Bison have amassed a 809–385–34 (.673) record since 1894 and have won 18 national championships: 10 as a member of Division I FCS, and 8 as a member of Division II. NDSU has won 36 conference championships, and has had 3 losing seasons since 1964. They have won 10 out of the last 15 FCS National Championships, the most in FCS history.

Eddie Cochems, known as the 'father of the forward pass', coached North Dakota State from 1902 to 1903, leading them to a 9–1 record and outscoring their opponents 499–49 in two seasons. It is said he experimented with the forward pass at NDSU, but it was not officially legal until 1906.

== Seasons ==
| Year | Coach | Overall | Conference | Standing | Bowl/playoffs | Coaches^{#} | AP^{°} |
|---|---|---|---|---|---|---|---|
Henry Luke Bolley (Independent) (1894–1899)
| 1894 | North Dakota Agricultural | 2–0 | | | | | |
| 1895 | North Dakota Agricultural | 1–1 | | | | | |
| 1896 | North Dakota Agricultural | 3–1–1 | | | | | |
| 1897 | North Dakota Agricultural | 0–3 | | | | | |
| 1898 | North Dakota Agricultural | 1–2 | | | | | |
| 1899 | North Dakota Agricultural | 0–1 | | | | | |
Jack Harrison (Independent) (1900–1901)
| 1900 | North Dakota Agricultural | 8–1–1 | | | | | |
| 1901 | North Dakota Agricultural | 7–0 | | | | | |
Eddie Cochems (Independent) (1902–1903)
| 1902 | North Dakota Agricultural | 4–0 | | | | | |
| 1903 | North Dakota Agricultural | 5–1 | | | | | |
A. L. Marshall (Independent) (1904–1905)
| 1904 | North Dakota Agricultural | 3–3 | | | | | |
| 1905 | North Dakota Agricultural | 1–4–1 | | | | | |
Gil Dobie (Independent) (1906–1907)
| 1906 | North Dakota Agricultural | 5–0 | | | | | |
| 1907 | North Dakota Agricultural | 3–0 | | | | | |
Paul Magoffin (Independent) (1908)
| 1908 | North Dakota Agricultural | 2–3 | | | | | |
Arthur Rueber (Independent) (1909–1912)
| 1909 | North Dakota Agricultural | 2–2–1 | | | | | |
| 1910 | North Dakota Agricultural | 2–3 | | | | | |
| 1911 | North Dakota Agricultural | 3–1 | | | | | |
| 1912 | North Dakota Agricultural | 5–1 | | | | | |
Howard Wood (Independent) (1913–1914)
| 1913 | North Dakota Agricultural | 0–2–2 | | | | | |
| 1914 | North Dakota Agricultural | 5–3 | | | | | |
Paul J. Davis (Independent) (1915–1917)
| 1915 | North Dakota Agricultural | 3–3 | | | | | |
| 1916 | North Dakota Agricultural | 3–2–1 | | | | | |
| 1917 | North Dakota Agricultural | 4–2 | | | | | |
Stanley Borleske (Independent) (1919–1921)
| 1919 | North Dakota Agricultural | 5–1–1 | | | | | |
| 1920 | North Dakota Agricultural | 2–3–1 | | | | | |
| 1921 | North Dakota Agricultural | 3–3–1 | | | | | |
Joe Cutting (North Central Conference) (1922)
| 1922 | North Dakota Agricultural | 6–2 | 1–2 | 5th | | | |
Stanley Borleske (North Central Conference) (1923–1924)
| 1923 | North Dakota Agricultural | 2–4–1 | 1–3 | 7th | | | |
| 1924 | North Dakota Agricultural | 5–3 | 3–3 | 4th | | | |
Ion Cortright (North Central Conference) (1925–1927)
| 1925 | North Dakota Agricultural | 5–0–2 | 4–0–2 | T–1st | | | |
| 1926 | North Dakota Agricultural | 5–3 | 2–3 | 6th | | | |
| 1927 | North Dakota Agricultural | 3–5 | 1–3 | 5th | | | |
Casey Finnegan (North Central Conference) (1928–1940)
| 1928 | North Dakota Agricultural | 3–4–1 | 1–3 | T–3rd | | | |
| 1929 | North Dakota Agricultural | 4–3–2 | 1–1–2 | 3rd | | | |
| 1930 | North Dakota Agricultural | 7–2 | 3–1 | 2nd | | | |
| 1931 | North Dakota Agricultural | 5–5 | 2–2 | T–2nd | | | |
| 1932 | North Dakota Agricultural | 7–2 | 4–0 | 1st | | | |
| 1933 | North Dakota Agricultural | 3–2–4 | 2–1–1 | 2nd | | | |
| 1934 | North Dakota Agricultural | 5–3–2 | 2–1–1 | T–2nd | | | |
| 1935 | North Dakota Agricultural | 7–1–1 | 4–0–1 | T–1st | | | |
| 1936 | North Dakota Agricultural | 4–5 | 2–2 | 3rd | | | |
| 1937 | North Dakota Agricultural | 5–4 | 2–2 | T–2nd | | | |
| 1938 | North Dakota Agricultural | 5–4 | 3–1 | T–2nd | | | |
| 1939 | North Dakota Agricultural | 1–6–1 | 0–5 | 7th | | | |
| 1940 | North Dakota Agricultural | 1–8 | 0–5 | 7th | | | |
Stan Kostka (North Central Conference) (1941)
| 1941 | North Dakota Agricultural | 2–7 | 2–4 | 5th | | | |
Robert A. Lowe (North Central Conference) (1942–1945)
| 1942 | North Dakota Agricultural | 2–5–1 | 2–3 | T–5th | | | |
| 1945 | North Dakota Agricultural | 1–4–1 | N/A | N/A | | | |
Stan Kostka (North Central Conference) (1946–1947)
| 1946 | North Dakota Agricultural | 5–3 | 4–1 | 2nd | | | |
| 1947 | North Dakota State | 1–7 | 0–5 | 7th | | | |
Howard Bliss (North Central Conference) (1948–1949)
| 1948 | North Dakota State | 3–7 | 2–4 | T–4th | | | |
| 1949 | North Dakota State | 0–9 | 0–6 | 7th | | | |
Mac Wenskunas (North Central Conference) (1950–1953)
| 1950 | North Dakota State | 2–7 | 0–6 | 7th | | | |
| 1951 | North Dakota State | 1–5–1 | 1–4–1 | 6th | | | |
| 1952 | North Dakota State | 5–4 | 4–2 | 2nd | | | |
| 1953 | North Dakota State | 3–5 | 2–4 | T–4th | | | |
Del Anderson (North Central Conference) (1954–1955)
| 1954 | North Dakota State | 1–7–1 | 1–4–1 | 6th | | | |
| 1955 | North Dakota State | 0–9 | 0–6 | 7th | | | |
Les Luymes (North Central Conference) (1956)
| 1956 | North Dakota State | 5–4 | 3–3 | T–4th | | | |
Bob Danielson (North Central Conference) (1957–1962)
| 1957 | North Dakota State | 0–8 | 0–5 | T–6th | | | |
| 1958 | North Dakota State | 3–6 | 2–4 | 6th | | | |
| 1959 | North Dakota State | 4–4–1 | 3–2–1 | T–2nd | | | |
| 1960 | North Dakota State | 3–5–1 | 2–3–1 | T–4th | | | |
| 1961 | North Dakota State | 3–6 | 1–5 | 6th | | | |
| 1962 | North Dakota State | 0–10 | 0–6 | 7th | | | |
Darrell Mudra (North Central Conference) (1963–1965)
| 1963 | North Dakota State | 3–5 | 3–3 | 4th | | | |
| 1964 | North Dakota State | 10–1 | 5–1 | T–1st | W Mineral Water | 10 | |
| 1965 | North Dakota State | 11–0 | 6–0 | 1st | W Pecan | 1 | 1 |
Ron Erhardt (North Central Conference) (1966–1972)
| 1966 | North Dakota State | 8–2 | 5–1 | T–1st | | 8 | 9 |
| 1967 | North Dakota State | 9–1 | 6–0 | 1st | L Pecan | 2 | 2 |
| 1968 | North Dakota State | 10–0 | 6–0 | 1st | W Pecan | 2 | 1 |
| 1969 | North Dakota State | 10–0 | 6–0 | 1st | W Camellia | 1 | 1 |
| 1970 | North Dakota State | 9–0–1 | 6–0 | 1st | W Camellia | 4 | 3 |
| 1971 | North Dakota State | 7–2 | 4–2 | T–2nd | | | |
| 1972 | North Dakota State | 8–2 | 6–1 | T–1st | | | |
Ev Kjelbertson (North Central Conference) (1973–1975)
| 1973 | North Dakota State | 8–2 | 6–1 | T–1st | | | 14 |
| 1974 | North Dakota State | 7–4 | 5–2 | T–1st | | | |
| 1975 | North Dakota State | 2–7 | 1–6 | T–7th | | | |
Jim Wacker (North Central Conference) (1976–1978)
| 1976 | North Dakota State | 9–3 | 6–0 | 1st | L NCAA Division II Semifinal | | T–10 |
| 1977 | North Dakota State | 9–2–1 | 6–0–1 | 1st | L NCAA Division II Semifinal | | 1 |
| 1978 | North Dakota State | 6–4 | 3–3 | T–3rd | | | |
Don Morton (North Central Conference) (1979–1984)
| 1979 | North Dakota State | 6–4 | 4–2 | T–2nd | | | |
| 1980 | North Dakota State | 6–4 | 5–2 | T–2nd | | | |
| 1981 | North Dakota State | 10–3 | 7–0 | 1st | L NCAA Division II Championship | | 6 |
| 1982 | North Dakota State | 12–1 | 7–0 | 1st | L NCAA Division II Semifinal | | 2 |
| 1983 | North Dakota State | 12–1 | 8–1 | T–1st | W NCAA Division II Championship | | 5 |
| 1984 | North Dakota State | 11–2 | 8–1 | T–1st | L NCAA Division II Championship | | 1 |
Earle Solomonson (North Central Conference) (1985–1986)
| 1985 | North Dakota State | 11–2–1 | 7–1–1 | 1st | W NCAA Division II Championship | | 7 |
| 1986 | North Dakota State | 13–0 | 9–0 | 1st | W NCAA Division II Championship | | 1 |
Rocky Hager (North Central Conference) (1987–1996)
| 1987 | North Dakota State | 6–4 | 6–3 | T–2nd | | | |
| 1988 | North Dakota State | 14–0 | 9–0 | 1st | W NCAA Division II Championship | | 1 |
| 1989 | North Dakota State | 8–3–1 | 6–2–1 | T–2nd | L NCAA Division II Quarterfinal | | 17 |
| 1990 | North Dakota State | 14–0 | 9–0 | 1st | W NCAA Division II Championship | | 1 |
| 1991 | North Dakota State | 7–3 | 7–1 | 1st | L NCAA Division II First Round | | 7 |
| 1992 | North Dakota State | 10–2 | 8–1 | 1st | L NCAA Division II Quarterfinal | | 2 |
| 1993 | North Dakota State | 7–3 | 6–3 | T–3rd | | | T–20 |
| 1994 | North Dakota State | 9–3 | 7–2 | T–1st | L NCAA Division II Quarterfinal | | 12 |
| 1995 | North Dakota State | 10–3 | 7–2 | T–2nd | L NCAA Division II Quarterfinal | | 13 |
| 1996 | North Dakota State | 6–4 | 5–4 | 5th | | | |
Bob Babich (North Central Conference) (1997–2002)
| 1997 | North Dakota State | 9–3 | 7–2 | T–2nd | L NCAA Division II First Round | | 16 |
| 1998 | North Dakota State | 7–4 | 6–3 | 4th | | | |
| 1999 | North Dakota State | 9–2 | 7–2 | 3rd | | | 13 |
| 2000 | North Dakota State | 12–2 | 8–1 | 2nd | L NCAA Division II Semifinal | | 3 |
| 2001 | North Dakota State | 7–3 | 5–3 | 3rd | | 22 | |
| 2002 | North Dakota State | 2–8 | 1–7 | 9th | | | |
Craig Bohl (North Central Conference) (2003)
| 2003 | North Dakota State | 8–3 | 5–2 | T–2nd | | 23 | 10 |
Craig Bohl (Great West Conference) (2004–2007)
| 2004 | North Dakota State | 8–3 | 2–3 | 3rd | Ineligible | 23 | 23 |
| 2005 | North Dakota State | 7–4 | 3–2 | 3rd | Ineligible | | |
| 2006 | North Dakota State | 10–1 | 4–0 | 1st | Ineligible | 5 | 5 |
| 2007 | North Dakota State | 10–1 | 3–1 | 2nd | Ineligible | 9 | 9 |
Craig Bohl (Missouri Valley Football Conference) (2008–2013)
| 2008 | North Dakota State | 6–5 | 4–4 | T–4th | | | |
| 2009 | North Dakota State | 3–8 | 2–6 | 7th | | | |
| 2010 | North Dakota State | 9–5 | 4–4 | T–3rd | L NCAA Division I FCS Quarterfinal | 9 | 9 |
| 2011 | North Dakota State | 14–1 | 7–1 | T–1st | W NCAA Division I FCS Championship | 1 | 1 |
| 2012 | North Dakota State | 14–1 | 7–1 | 1st | W NCAA Division I FCS Championship | 1 | 1 |
| 2013 | North Dakota State | 15–0 | 8–0 | 1st | W NCAA Division I FCS Championship | 1 | 1 |
Chris Klieman (Missouri Valley Football Conference) (2014–2018)
| 2014 | North Dakota State | 15–1 | 7–1 | T–1st | W NCAA Division I FCS Championship | 1 | 1 |
| 2015 | North Dakota State | 13–2 | 7–1 | T–1st | W NCAA Division I FCS Championship | 1 | 1 |
| 2016 | North Dakota State | 12–2 | 7–1 | T–1st | L NCAA Division I FCS Semifinal | 3 | 3 |
| 2017 | North Dakota State | 14–1 | 7–1 | 1st | W NCAA Division I FCS Championship | 1 | 1 |
| 2018 | North Dakota State | 15–0 | 8–0 | 1st | W NCAA Division I FCS Championship | 1 | 1 |
Matt Entz (Missouri Valley Football Conference) (2019–2023)
| 2019 | North Dakota State | 16–0 | 8–0 | 1st | W NCAA Division I FCS Championship | 1 | 1 |
| 2020 | North Dakota State | 7–3 | 5–2 | 4th | L NCAA Division I FCS Quarterfinal | 6 | 7 |
| 2021 | North Dakota State | 14–1 | 7–1 | 1st | W NCAA Division I FCS Championship | 1 | 1 |
| 2022 | North Dakota State | 12–3 | 7–1 | 2nd | L NCAA Division I FCS Championship | 2 | 2 |
| 2023 | North Dakota State | 11–4 | 5–3 | 4th | L NCAA Division I FCS Semifinal | 3 | 3 |
Tim Polasek (Missouri Valley Football Conference) (2024–2025)
| 2024 | North Dakota State | 14–2 | 7–1 | T–1st | W NCAA Division I FCS Championship | 1 | 1 |
| 2025 | North Dakota State | 12–1 | 8–0 | 1st | L NCAA Division I FCS Second Round | 4т | 5 |
Tim Polasek (Mountain West Conference) (2026–present)
| 2026 | North Dakota State | 0–0 | 0–0 | | | | |
| Total: | | 809–385–34 | | | | | |
National championship Conference title Conference division title or championship game berth
^{†}Indicates Bowl Coalition, Bowl Alliance, BCS, or CFP / New Years' Six bowl.; ^{#}Rankings from final Coaches Poll.

== Postseason facts ==
Years in Postseason: 38
DII Postseason Record: 35-13 (.729)
DI Postseason Record: 51-6 (.895)
OVERALL PLAYOFF RECORD: 86-19 (.819)

=== Championships ===
National Championships: 18 (1965, 1968, 1969, 1983, 1985, 1986, 1988, 1990, 2011–2015, 2017–2019, 2021, 2024)
National Runner-Up: 4 (1967, 1981, 1984, 2022)
National 3rd Place: 7 (1970, 1976, 1977, 1982, 2000, 2016, 2023)

- Championships and placings prior to 1973 were determined by AP or UPI polls. Championships and runner-up finishes after that were through the NCAA playoff format. Third-place finishes after 1973 were the result of semifinal losses in the playoff system.
