= List of North Dakota State Bison men's basketball head coaches =

The following is a list of North Dakota State Bison men's basketball head coaches. There have been 23 head coaches of the Bison in their 124-season history.

North Dakota State's current head coach is David Richman. He was hired as the Bison's head coach in April 2014, replacing Saul Phillips, who left to become the head coach at Ohio.

No.	Tenure	Coach	Years	Record	Pct.
–	1897–1906	No coach	9	35–27	.565
1	1906–1908	Gil Dobie	2	17–5	.773
2	1908–1909	Paul Magoffin	1	11–4	.733
3	1909–1913	Arthur Rueber	4	42–6	.875
4	1913–1915	Howard Wood	2	22–4	.846
5	1915–1918	Paul J. Davis	3	37–10	.787
6	1918–1919	Curly Movold	1	9–5	.643
7	1919–1922	Stanley Borleske	3	42–14	.750
8	1922–1925	George Dewey	3	56–15	.789
9	1925–1926	Ion Cortright	1	22–3	.880
10	1926–1933	Leonard Saalwaechter	7	71–68	.511
11	1933–1946 (Note: North Dakota State did not field a team for the 1943–44 and 1944–45 seasons.)	Robert A. Lowe	11	141–102	.580
12	1946–1949	C. P. Reed	3	32–41	.438
13	1949–1965	Chuck Bentson	16	169–207	.449
14	1965–1968	Doug Cowman	3	33–41	.446
15	1968–1972	Bud Belk	4	50–55	.476
16	1972–1978	Marv Skaar	6	93–69	.574
17	1978–1992	Ervin Inniger	14	244–150	.619
18	1992–1997	Tom Billeter	5	97–50	.660
19	1997–2000	Ray Giacoletti	3	48–33	.593
20	2000–2001	Greg McDermott	1	15–11	.577
21	2001–2007	Tim Miles	6	99–71	.582
22	2007–2014	Saul Phillips	7	134–84	.615
23	2014–present	David Richman	10	190–131	.592
Totals		23 coaches	124 seasons	1,709–1,206	.586
Records updated through end of 2023–24 season Source
