= 1924 North Dakota Agricultural Bison football team =

American college football season

1924 North Dakota Agricultural Bison football
- Conference: North Central Conference
- Record: 5–3 (3–3 NCC)
- Head coach: Stanley Borleske (5th season)
- Captain: Wallace Thompson
- Home stadium: Dacotah Field

1924 North Central Conference football standings
	Conf.					Overall
Team	W		L		T	W		L		T
South Dakota State $	5	–	0	–	0	7	–	1	–	0
South Dakota	4	–	1	–	0	6	–	2	–	0
Creighton	3	–	1	–	0	6	–	1	–	2
North Dakota Agricultural	3	–	3	–	0	5	–	3	–	0
Nebraska Wesleyan	1	–	2	–	0	2	–	4	–	2
Des Moines	1	–	3	–	0	2	–	6	–	0
Morningside	1	–	4	–	0	2	–	5	–	0
North Dakota	1	–	4	–	0	3	–	3	–	0
St. Thomas (MN)	0	–	1	–	0	5	–	2	–	0
$ – Conference champion

The 1924 North Dakota Agricultural Bison football team was an American football team that represented North Dakota Agricultural College (now known as North Dakota State University) in the North Central Conference (NCC) during the 1924 college football season. In its fifth season under head coach Stanley Borleske, the team compiled a 5–3 record (3–3 against NCC opponents) and finished in fourth place out of nine teams in the NCC. The team played its home games at Dacotah Field in Fargo, North Dakota.

== Schedule ==
Date	Opponent	Site	Result	Attendance	Source
September 27	Jamestown*	Dacotah Field; Fargo, ND	W 38–7		
October 4	at South Dakota State	Brookings, SD (rivalry)	L 0–14		
October 11	St. Thomas (MN)	Dacotah Field; Fargo, ND	W 13–0		
October 18	Des Moines	Dacotah Field; Fargo, ND	L 3–7		
October 25	North Dakota	Dacotah Field; Fargo, ND (rivalry)	W 20–7		
November 1	at Morningside	Sioux City, IA	W 9–3		
November 8	at South Dakota	Vermillion, SD	L 6–13		
November 15	Concordia (MN)*	Dacotah Field; Fargo, ND	W 13–9		
*Non-conference game
