= 1952 South Dakota Coyotes football team =

American college football season

1952 South Dakota Coyotes football
- Conference: North Central Conference
- Record: 4–3–1 (3–2–1 NCC)
- Head coach: Harry Gamage (14th season)
- Home stadium: Inman Field

1952 North Central Conference football standings
	Conf.					Overall
Team	W		L		T	W		L		T
Iowa State Teachers $	5	–	1	–	0	6	–	2	–	0
North Dakota State	4	–	2	–	0	5	–	4	–	0
South Dakota	3	–	2	–	1	4	–	3	–	1
South Dakota State	3	–	2	–	1	4	–	4	–	1
Morningside	3	–	3	–	0	5	–	3	–	0
North Dakota	2	–	4	–	0	3	–	6	–	0
Augustana (SD)	0	–	6	–	0	0	–	9	–	0
$ – Conference champion

The 1952 South Dakota Coyotes football team was an American football team that represented the University of South Dakota as a member of the North Central Conference (NCC) during the 1952 college football season. In their 14th season under head coach Harry Gamage, the Coyotes compiled a 4–3–1 record (3–2–1 against NCC opponents), tied for third place out of seven teams in the NCC, and were outscored by a total of 193 to 179. They played their home games at Inman Field in Vermillion, South Dakota.

== Schedule ==
Date	Opponent	Site	Result	Attendance	Source
September 20	at Nebraska*	Memorial Stadium; Lincoln, NE	L 0–46	30,000	
September 27	Augustana (SD)	Inman Field; Vermillion, SD	W 62–18	3,000	
October 4	at North Dakota	Memorial Stadium; Grand Forks, ND (rivalry)	W 21–14		
October 11	Omaha*	Inman Field; Vermillion, SD	W 27–14		
October 18	at Morningside	Public Schools Stadium; Sioux City, IA	L 7–27		
October 25	South Dakota State	Inman Field; Vermillion, SD (Dakota Day, rivalry)	T 21–21	10,000	
November 1	at Iowa State Teachers	O. R. Latham Stadium; Cedar Falls, IA	W 34–20	6,000	
November 8	North Dakota State	Inman Field; Vermillion, SD	L 7–33		
*Non-conference game
