= 1961 South Dakota State Jackrabbits football team =

American college football season

1961 South Dakota State Jackrabbits football
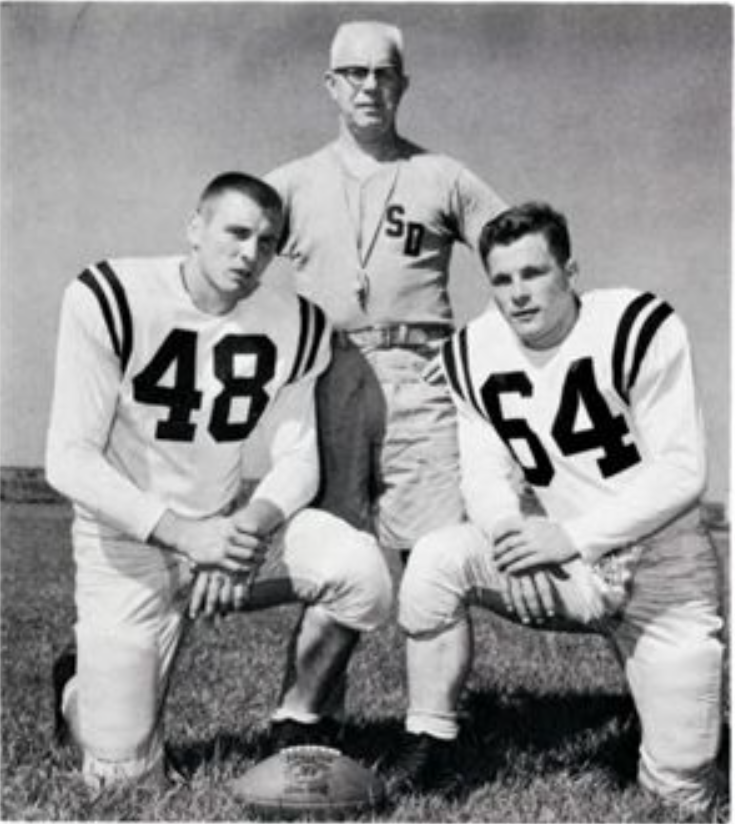
- Ralph Ginn with 1961 co-captains Thorne and Sterner

NCC co-champion
- Conference: North Central Conference
- Record: 8–2 (5–1 NCC)
- Head coach: Ralph Ginn (15th season)
- Captains: Joe Thorne; Mike Sterner
- Home stadium: State Field

1961 North Central Conference football standings
	Conf.					Overall
Team	W		L		T	W		L		T
South Dakota State +	5	–	1	–	0	8	–	2	–	0
State College of Iowa +	5	–	1	–	0	7	–	2	–	0
North Dakota	4	–	2	–	0	6	–	3	–	0
Augustana (SD)	4	–	2	–	0	5	–	3	–	1
Morningside	2	–	4	–	0	3	–	6	–	0
North Dakota State	1	–	5	–	0	3	–	6	–	0
South Dakota	0	–	6	–	0	1	–	8	–	0
+ – Conference co-champions

The 1961 South Dakota State Jackrabbits football team was an American football team that represented South Dakota State University as a member of the North Central Conference during the 1961 college football season. In their 15th season under head coach Ralph Ginn, the Jackrabbits compiled an 8–2 record (5–1 in conference games), tied for the NCC championship, and outscored opponents by a total of 376 to 97.

Fullback Joe Thorne led the team in rushing (958 yards) and scoring (72 points) and received second-team honors on the 1961 Little All-America college football team.

The team played its home games at State Field in Brookings, South Dakota.

== Schedule ==
Date	Opponent	Site	Result	Attendance	Source
September 9	at Bemidji State*	Bemidji, MN	W 34–8	1,200	
September 16	Colorado State–Greeley*	Brookings, SD	W 36–13	5,000	
September 23	St. Cloud State*	Brookings, SD	W 73–0	2,500	
September 30	at Montana State*	Gatton Field; Bozeman, MT	L 12–17	4,500	
October 7	at Augustana (SD)	Howard Wood Field; Sioux Falls, SD	W 41–14	6,671	
October 14	at North Dakota	Memorial Stadium; Grand Forks, ND	L 13–14	7,800–7,963	
October 21	South Dakota	Brookings, SD (rivalry, Hobo Day)	W 34–6	5,000–7,500	
October 28	North Dakota State	State Field; Brookings, SD (Dakota Marker)	W 41–12	2,500	
November 4	Morningside	Public Schools Stadium; Sioux City, IA	W 56–0	750	
November 11	State College of Iowa	State Field; Brookings, SD	W 36–13	4,700	
*Non-conference game

== Statistics ==
The team tallied 4,061 yards of total offense (406.1 yards per game), consisting of 2,746 rushing yards (274.6 yards per game) and 1,315 passing yards (131.5 yards per game). On defense, South Dakota State gave up 1,944 yards (194.4 yards per game) with 1,219 rushing yards (121.9 yards per game) and 725 passing yards (72.5 yards per game).

Quarterback Dean Koster led the team in passing, completing 68 of 118 passes for 1,147 yards with 11 touchdowns and five interceptions. He also led the team with 1,175 yards of total offense.

Fullback Joe Thorne led the team in rushing with 958 yards on 174 carries. Thorne was also the team's leading scorer with 72 points on 12 touchdowns and a two-point conversion run. Halfbacks Wayne Rasmussen and Jim Dwyer tied for second place in rushing, each with 387 rushing yards.

End Roger Eischens was the team's leading receiver with 27 catches for 470 yards and four touchdowns.

== Awards and honors ==
Fullback Joe Thorne received second-team honors on the 1961 Little All-America college football team.

Thorne and halfback Dan Boals of State College of Iowa were selected by the Associated Press (AP) as the most valuable players in the North Central Conference (NCC). Six South Dakota State players were recognized by the AP or the United Press International (UPI) on the 1961 All-North Central Conference football team: Roger Eischens at end (AP-1, UPI-1); Mike Sterner at guard (AP-1, UPI-1); Thorne at fullback (AP-1, UPI-2); Ron Frank at tackle (AP-2, UPI-1); Dean Koster at quarterback (AP-1, UPI-honorable mention); and John Sterner at guard (AP-2, UPI-2).

== Personnel ==
=== Players ===
- Jim Dwyer, halfback, Wessington Springs, SD
- Roger Eischens, end, junior, 6'0", 192 pounds, Canby, MN
- Ron Frank, tackle, senior, 6'6", 225 pounds, Milan, MN
- Casper Klucas, halfback, Watertown, SD
- Dean Koster, quarterback, junior, 5'10", 177 pounds, Lake Benton, MN
- Doug Peterson, Watertown, SD
- Wayne Rasmussen, halfback and punter, Howard, SD
- John Sterner, guard, senior, 5'9", 189 pounds, Sioux Falls, SD
- Mike Sterner, guard and co-captain, senior, 5'10", 193 pounds, Sioux Falls, SD
- Joe Thorne, fullback and co-captain, senior, 6'1", 190 pounds, Beresford, SD
- Darrell Tramp, end, Elk Point, SD

=== Coaches and staff ===
- Head coach: Ralph Ginn
- Assistant coaches: Erv Huether (backfield coach), Stan Marshall (line coach), Warren Williamson (freshman coach)
- Trainer: Don Hanson
- Equipment manager: John A. Johnson
