= 1959 North Dakota Fighting Sioux football team =

American college football season

1959 North Dakota Fighting Sioux football
- Conference: North Central Conference
- Record: 2–5–1 (1–4–1 NCC)
- Head coach: Marvin C. Helling (3rd season)
- Home stadium: Memorial Stadium

1959 North Central Conference football standings
	Conf.					Overall
Team	W		L		T	W		L		T
Augustana (SD) $	4	–	1	–	1	6	–	2	–	1
North Dakota State	3	–	2	–	1	4	–	4	–	1
South Dakota	3	–	2	–	1	4	–	5	–	1
Iowa State Teachers	3	–	3	–	0	6	–	3	–	0
Morningside	3	–	3	–	0	5	–	4	–	0
South Dakota State	2	–	4	–	0	2	–	7	–	0
North Dakota	1	–	4	–	1	2	–	5	–	1
$ – Conference champion

The 1959 North Dakota Fighting Sioux football team, also known as the Nodaks, was an American football team that represented the University of North Dakota in the North Central Conference (NCC) during the 1959 college football season. In its third year under head coach Marvin C. Helling, the team compiled a 2–5–1 record (1–4–1 against NCC opponents), finished in sixth place out of seven teams in the NCC, and was outscored by a total of 166 to 112. The team played its home games at Memorial Stadium in Grand Forks, North Dakota.

== Schedule ==
Date	Opponent	Site	Result	Attendance	Source
September 12	at Montana	Dornblaser Field; Missoula, MT	W 27–19	3,800	
September 19	Augustana (SD)	Memorial Stadium; Grand Forks, ND	T 22–22	4,900	
September 26	Morningside	Memorial Stadium; Grand Forks, ND	L 6–24	4,700	
October 3	at South Dakota	Inman Field; Vermillion, SD	L 14–31	3,500	
October 10	South Dakota State	Memorial Stadium; Grand Forks, ND	L 0–6	4,912–5,000	
October 17	at North Dakota State	Dacotah Field; Fargo, ND	W 20–15		
October 24	at Iowa State Teachers	O. R. Latham Stadium; Cedar Falls, IA	L 9–14		
October 31	at No. 12 Montana State	Gatton Field; Bozeman, MT	L 14–35		
Rankings from UPI Poll released prior to the game
