= 1958 Iowa State Teachers Panthers football team =

American college football season

1958 Iowa State Teachers Panthers football
- Conference: North Central Conference
- Record: 4–5 (1–5 NCC)
- Head coach: Willard Hammer (1st season)
- Home stadium: O. R. Latham Stadium

1958 North Central Conference football standings
	Conf.					Overall
Team	W		L		T	W		L		T
North Dakota $	5	–	1	–	0	5	–	3	–	0
South Dakota	4	–	2	–	0	5	–	4	–	0
Augustana (SD)	3	–	3	–	0	5	–	3	–	0
Morningside	3	–	3	–	0	4	–	4	–	0
South Dakota State	3	–	3	–	0	4	–	5	–	0
North Dakota State	2	–	4	–	0	3	–	6	–	0
Iowa State Teachers	1	–	5	–	0	4	–	5	–	0
$ – Conference champion

The 1958 Iowa State Teachers Panthers football team was an American football team that represented Iowa State Teachers College (later renamed University of Northern Iowa) as a member of the North Central Conference (NCC) during the 1958 college football season. In their first season under head coach Willard Hammer, the Panthers compiled a 4–5 record (1–5 in conference games) and finished in last place in the NCC.

Two I.S.T. players were named to the all-NCC team: halfback Bob Hahn and tackle Dennis Remmert.

The team played its home games at O. R. Latham Stadium in Cedar Falls, Iowa.

== Schedule ==
Date	Opponent	Site	Result	Attendance	Source
September 13	Bradley	O. R. Latham Stadium; Cedar Falls, IA	W 29–12	6,800	
September 20	at Mankato State	Mankato, MN	W 25–0		
September 27	North Dakota State	O. R. Latham Stadium; Cedar Falls, IA	W 21–11		
October 4	Drake	Clyde Williams Field; Ames, IA	W 20–16	6,000	
October 11	at Augustana (SD)	Sioux Falls, SD	L 15–26		
October 18	Morningside	O. R. Latham Stadium; Cedar Falls, IA	L 15–26		
October 25	at North Dakota	Memorial Stadium; Grand Forks, ND	L 0–14		
November 8	South Dakota State	O. R. Latham Stadium; Cedar Falls, IA	L 8–13		
November 15	at South Dakota	Inman Field; Vermillion, SD	L 14–38		
