= Glenn Johnson =

Glenn Johnson may refer to:

- Glenn Johnson (American football) (1922–2001), American football player who played for the Green Bay Packers in 1949
- Glenn Johnson (footballer, born 1952), English footballer for Aldershot, Doncaster Rovers and Walsall
- Glenn Johnson (drummer), rock drummer and composer
- Glenn Johnson (coach), American football, basketball and baseball player and coach

== See also ==
- Glen Johnson (disambiguation)
