= 1961 North Dakota Fighting Sioux football team =

American college football season

1961 North Dakota Fighting Sioux football
- Conference: North Central Conference
- Record: 6–3 (4–2 NCC)
- Head coach: Marvin C. Helling (5th season)
- Home stadium: Memorial Stadium

1961 North Central Conference football standings
	Conf.					Overall
Team	W		L		T	W		L		T
South Dakota State +	5	–	1	–	0	8	–	2	–	0
State College of Iowa +	5	–	1	–	0	7	–	2	–	0
North Dakota	4	–	2	–	0	6	–	3	–	0
Augustana (SD)	4	–	2	–	0	5	–	3	–	1
Morningside	2	–	4	–	0	3	–	6	–	0
North Dakota State	1	–	5	–	0	3	–	6	–	0
South Dakota	0	–	6	–	0	1	–	8	–	0
+ – Conference co-champions

The 1961 North Dakota Fighting Sioux football team, also known as the Nodaks, was an American football team that represented the University of North Dakota in the North Central Conference (NCC) during the 1961 college football season. In its fifth year under head coach Marvin C. Helling, the team compiled a 6–3 record (4–2 in conference games), tied for third place out of seven teams in the NCC, and outscored opponents by a total of 189 to 134.

The team's statistical leaders included quarterback Bob Glas, halfback Bill Haberkorn, and end Gene Tetrault.

The team played its home games at Memorial Stadium in Grand Forks, North Dakota.

== Schedule ==
Date	Opponent	Site	Result	Attendance	Source
September 16	Montana State*	Memorial Stadium; Grand Forks, ND	W 46–0	5,500–5,778	
September 23	at Nebraska*	Memorial Stadium; Lincoln, NE	L 0–33	22,000–25,129	
September 30	Morningside	Memorial Stadium; Grand Forks, ND	W 49–15	5,109	
October 7	at South Dakota	Inman Field; Vermillion, SD (rivalry)	W 21–7	2,000–3,000	
October 14	South Dakota State	Memorial Stadium; Grand Forks, ND	W 14–13	7,800–7,963	
October 21	at North Dakota State	Dacotah Field; Fargo, ND (rivalry)	W 26–6		
October 28	at State College of Iowa	O. R. Latham Stadium; Cedar Falls, IA	L 0–25	6,000	
November 4	at Youngstown*	Rayen Stadium; Youngstown, OH	W 20–13		
November 11	Augustana (SD)	Memorial Stadium; Grand Forks, ND	L 13–22		
*Non-conference game

== Statistics ==
End Gene Tetrault was selected as the most valuable lineman, and Joe Taylor was selected as the most valuable back. Taylor played halfback on offense and safety on defense and tallied 248 rushing yards, 135 receiving yards, and 38 points scored.

== Awards honors ==
Three North Dakota players were selected by the Associated Press (AP) or United Press International (UPI) on the 1961 All-North Central Conference football team: halfback Bill Haberkorn (AP-2; UPI-1); tackle Gene Tetrault (AP-1, UPI-2); center Duane Breitling (UPI-1); end Gary Sukut (AP-2).
