= 1961 State College of Iowa Panthers football team =

American college football season

1961 State College of Iowa Panthers football

NCC co-champion
- Conference: North Central Conference
- Record: 7–2 (5–1 NCC)
- Head coach: Stan Sheriff (2nd season)
- Captains: Dan Boals; Carl Bowman; Bruce Wiegmann; Wendell Williams
- Home stadium: O. R. Latham Stadium

1961 North Central Conference football standings
	Conf.					Overall
Team	W		L		T	W		L		T
South Dakota State +	5	–	1	–	0	8	–	2	–	0
State College of Iowa +	5	–	1	–	0	7	–	2	–	0
North Dakota	4	–	2	–	0	6	–	3	–	0
Augustana (SD)	4	–	2	–	0	5	–	3	–	1
Morningside	2	–	4	–	0	3	–	6	–	0
North Dakota State	1	–	5	–	0	3	–	6	–	0
South Dakota	0	–	6	–	0	1	–	8	–	0
+ – Conference co-champions

The 1961 State College of Iowa Panthers football team, commonly known as "S.C.I.", was an American football team that represented Iowa State Teachers College (later renamed University of Northern Iowa) in the North Central Conference during the 1961 college football season. In their second season under head coach Stan Sheriff, the Panthers compiled a 7–2 record (5–1 in conference). They led the NCC until the final game of the season when they lost to South Dakota State, resulting in the two teams sharing the conference championship.

Guard and co-captain Wendell Williams was selected as a first-team player on the 1961 Little All-America college football team. Fullback and co-captain Dan Boals set a new school record with 1,003 rushing yards and was selected as one of the two outstanding backs in the NCC.

The team played its home games at O. R. Latham Stadium in Cedar Falls, Iowa.

== Schedule ==
Date	Opponent	Site	Result	Attendance	Source
September 16	at Bradley*	Bradley Stadium; Peoria, IL	W 37–26	3,500	
September 23	Mankato State*	O. R. Latham Stadium; Cedar Falls, IA	W 19–0		
September 30	at North Dakota State	Dacotah Field; Fargo, ND	W 33–8		
October 7	at Drake*	Drake Stadium; Des Moines, IA	L 6–21	5,000	
October 14	Augustana (SD)^{†}	O. R. Latham Stadium; Cedar Falls, IA	W 34–6	6,500	
October 21	at Morningside	Public School Stadium; Sioux City, IA	W 43–14	> 4,000	
October 28	North Dakota	O. R. Latham Stadium; Cedar Falls, IA (Dad's Day)	W 25–0	6,000	
November 4	South Dakota	O. R. Latham Stadium; Cedar Falls, IA	W 27–7		
November 11	at South Dakota State	State Field; Brookings, SD	L 13–36	4,700	
*Non-conference game; ^{†}Homecoming

== Statistics ==
The team set a new school record with 2,276 rushing yards. The effort was led by Dan Boals who set an individual school record with 1,003 rushing yards on 162 carries (6.19 yards per carry) and an NCC record with 738 rushing yards in conference games. He also led the team in scoring with 79 points. Boals' 1,003 rushing yards ranked sixth nationally among small-college players.

Quarterback Dave Cox also set a new school record with 15 touchdown passes.

Halfback Howard Becker added 610 rushing yards on 102 carries (5.98 yards per carry) and scored 54 points.

== Awards and honors ==
Fullback Dan Boals, end Carl Bowman, halfback Bruce Wiegmann, and guard Wendel Williams were the team's co-captains.

Williams was selected by the Associated Press as a first-team player on the 1961 Little All-America college football team. Boals received honorable mention.

Three SCI players were included on the 1961 All-North Central Conference football team: Boals; Williams; and tackle Al Sonnenberg. Several other received second-team honors: quarterback Dave Cox; halfback Howard Becker; end Carl Bowman; and tackle Ken Kroemer. Boals and South Dakota State's Joe Thorne were named the NCC's outstanding backs.

== Personnel ==
=== Players ===
The following 24 players received varsity letters:

- Bob Andrews, end, senior, Spencer, IA
- Howard Becker, halfback, senior, 185 pounds, Mendota, IL
- Dan Boals, fullback, 190 pounds, Urbandale, IA
- Carl Bowman, end, senior, Osage, IA
- Jack Carlson, sophomore, Cedar Rapids, IA
- Dave Cox, quarterback, junior, 180 pounds, Bettendorf, IA
- Bob Crane, halfback, senior, Glenville, MN
- Gene Doyle, quarterback, senior, Toledo
- Dan Eichelberger, Anamosa, IA
- Hurley Hanley, end, senior, 190 pounds, Keokuk, IA
- Charles Hill, Detroit, MI
- Ken Kroemer, tackle, senior, 225 pounds, Lowden, IA
- Ted Minnick, Iowa City, IA
- Pat Mitchell, end, 190 pounds, Osage, IA
- John Raffensperger, end, senior, Iowa City, IA
- Eldon Reinhardt, guard, 190 pounds, Webster City, IA
- Darnell Sanford, Harvey, IL
- Al Sonnenberg, tackle/center, senior, 220 pounds, Collinsville, IL
- Bob Stevens, Cedar Rapids, IA
- Larry Thompson, sophomore, Waterloo, IA
- Larry Van Oort, sophomore, Forest City, IA
- Gary Wilcox, tackle, senior, Harlan, IA
- Bruce Wiegmann, halfback, 175 pounds, Waverly, IA
- Wendell Williams, guard, senior, 195 pounds, Mount Pleasant, IA

=== Coaches and administrators ===
- Head coach: Stan Sheriff
- Assistant coaches: Bub Bitcon, Dennis Remmert, Warren Hansen
- Athletic director: Jim Witham
- Manager: Fred Hahn
