= 1953 Iowa State Teachers Panthers football team =

American college football season

1953 Iowa State Teachers Panthers football
- Conference: North Central Conference
- Record: 6–3 (5–1 NCC)
- Head coach: Clyde Starbeck (16th season)
- Home stadium: O. R. Latham Stadium

1953 North Central Conference football standings
	Conf.					Overall
Team	W		L		T	W		L		T
South Dakota State $	5	–	0	–	1	5	–	3	–	1
Iowa State Teachers	5	–	1	–	0	6	–	3	–	0
North Dakota	4	–	1	–	1	6	–	1	–	1
Morningside	2	–	4	–	0	3	–	5	–	0
North Dakota State	2	–	4	–	0	3	–	5	–	0
South Dakota	2	–	4	–	0	2	–	6	–	0
Augustana (SD)	0	–	6	–	0	1	–	8	–	0
$ – Conference champion

The 1953 Iowa State Teachers Panthers football team was an American football team that represented Iowa State Teachers College in the North Central Conference during the 1953 college football season. In its 15th season under head coach Clyde Starbeck, the team compiled a 6–3 record (5–1 in NCC games) and finished in second place in the NCC.

Five players won all-conference honors: end Dick Beetsch; halfback Ralph Capitani; tackle LeRoy Dunn; halfback Art Landau; and guard Jim Wachenheim.

The team played its home games at O. R. Latham Stadium in Cedar Falls, Iowa.

== Schedule ==
Date	Opponent	Site	Result	Attendance	Source
September 19	Central Michigan*	O. R. Latham Stadium; Cedar Falls, IA	L 20–34		
September 26	at South Dakota State	Brookings, SD	L 19–52		
October 3	Coe*	O. R. Latham Stadium; Cedar Falls, IA	W 21–7		
October 9	at North Dakota State	Dacotah Field; Fargo, ND	W 27–21		
October 17	North Dakota	Memorial Stadium; Grand Forks, ND	W 34–6		
October 24	Augustana (SD)	O. R. Latham Stadium; Cedar Falls, IA	W 39–13		
October 31	Morningside*^{†}	O. R. Latham Stadium; Cedar Falls, IA	W 34–20	3,500	
November 7	at South Dakota	Inman Field; Vermillion, SD	W 34–27	3,000	
November 13	at Drake	Drake Stadium; Des Moines, IA	L 20–27	4,000	
*Non-conference game; ^{†}Homecoming
