= 1952 Iowa State Teachers Panthers football team =

American college football season

1952 Iowa State Teachers Panthers football

NCC champion
- Conference: North Central Conference
- Record: 6–2 (5–1 NCC)
- Head coach: Clyde Starbeck (15th season)
- Home stadium: O. R. Latham Stadium

1952 North Central Conference football standings
	Conf.					Overall
Team	W		L		T	W		L		T
Iowa State Teachers $	5	–	1	–	0	6	–	2	–	0
North Dakota State	4	–	2	–	0	5	–	4	–	0
South Dakota	3	–	2	–	1	4	–	3	–	1
South Dakota State	3	–	2	–	1	4	–	4	–	1
Morningside	3	–	3	–	0	5	–	3	–	0
North Dakota	2	–	4	–	0	3	–	6	–	0
Augustana (SD)	0	–	6	–	0	0	–	9	–	0
$ – Conference champion

The 1952 Iowa State Teachers Panthers football team represented Iowa State Teachers College in the North Central Conference during the 1952 college football season. In its 15th season under head coach Clyde Starbeck, the team compiled a 5–2 record (5–1 against NCC opponents) and won the conference championship. The team played its home games at O. R. Latham Stadium in Cedar Falls, Iowa.

Six players won all-conference honors: halfback Bill Olson; fullback John Corey; center Lou Bohnsack; end Mahlon Kaylor; guard Karl Raush; and tackle Bud Rowray.

== Schedule ==
Date	Time	Opponent	Site	Result	Attendance	Source
September 20	8:00 p.m.	Drake*	O. R. Latham Stadium; Cedar Falls, IA	L 12–14		
September 27		North Dakota State	O. R. Latham Stadium; Cedar Falls, IA	W 32–0	5,200	
October 4	8:00 p.m.	Coe*	O. R. Latham Stadium; Cedar Falls, IA	W 27–24		
October 11		at North Dakota	Grand Forks, ND	W 27–14		
October 18		at Augustana (SD)	Sioux Falls, SD	W 47–0		
October 25		at Morningside	Sioux City, IA	W 28–26		
November 1		South Dakota	O. R. Latham Stadium; Cedar Falls, IA	L 20–34		
November 8		South Dakota State	O. R. Latham Stadium; Cedar Falls, IA	W 47–34	6,000	
*Non-conference game; All times are in Central time
