= 1958 South Dakota State Jackrabbits football team =

American college football season

1958 South Dakota State Jackrabbits football
- Conference: North Central Conference
- Record: 4–5 (3–3 NCC)
- Head coach: Ralph Ginn (12th season)
- Home stadium: State Field

1958 North Central Conference football standings
	Conf.					Overall
Team	W		L		T	W		L		T
North Dakota $	5	–	1	–	0	5	–	3	–	0
South Dakota	4	–	2	–	0	5	–	4	–	0
Augustana (SD)	3	–	3	–	0	5	–	3	–	0
Morningside	3	–	3	–	0	4	–	4	–	0
South Dakota State	3	–	3	–	0	4	–	5	–	0
North Dakota State	2	–	4	–	0	3	–	6	–	0
Iowa State Teachers	1	–	5	–	0	4	–	5	–	0
$ – Conference champion

The 1958 South Dakota State Jackrabbits football team was an American football team that represented South Dakota State University in the North Central Conference during the 1958 college football season. In its 12th season under head coach Ralph Ginn, the team compiled a 4–5 record, finished in a three-way tie for third place out of seven teams in the NCC, and was outscored by a total of 158 to 123.

== Schedule ==
Date	Opponent	Site	Result	Attendance	Source
September 13	Drake*	State Field; Brookings, SD	W 12–6	1,000	
September 20	at Marquette*	Marquette Stadium; Milwaukee, WI	L 7–18	11,500	
September 27	at No. 14 Montana State*	Gatton Field; Bozeman, MT	L 6–23	5,700–6,700	
October 4	Augustana (SD)	State Field; Brookings, SD	W 20–6	6,200	
October 11	North Dakota	State Field; Brookings, SD	L 12–30	8,500–9,500	
October 18	at South Dakota^{†}	Inman Field; Vermillion, SD (Dakota Day, rivalry)	L 7–28	9,500	
October 25	at North Dakota State	Dacotah Field; Fargo, ND (rivalry)	L 20–33	1,000	
November 1	Morningside	State Field; Brookings, SD	W 26–6	3,500	
November 8	at Iowa State Teachers	O. R. Latham Stadium; Cedar Falls, IA	W 13–8	3,100	
*Non-conference game; ^{†}Homecoming; Rankings from UPI Poll released prior to the game; Source:
