= 1951 Iowa State Teachers Panthers football team =

American college football season

1951 Iowa State Teachers Panthers football
- Conference: North Central Conference
- Record: 3–4 (3–3 NCC)
- Head coach: Clyde Starbeck (14th season)
- Home stadium: O. R. Latham Stadium

1951 North Central Conference football standings
| | Conf. | | | | | Overall |
| Team | W | | L | | T | W | | L | | T |
|---|---|---|---|---|---|---|---|---|---|---|
| South Dakota $ | 6 | – | 0 | – | 0 | 7 | – | 1 | – | 0 |
| South Dakota State | 4 | – | 1 | – | 1 | 8 | – | 1 | – | 1 |
| Iowa State Teachers | 3 | – | 3 | – | 0 | 3 | – | 4 | – | 0 |
| North Dakota | 2 | – | 3 | – | 0 | 2 | – | 4 | – | 0 |
| Morningside | 2 | – | 4 | – | 0 | 3 | – | 5 | – | 1 |
| North Dakota State | 1 | – | 4 | – | 1 | 1 | – | 5 | – | 1 |
| Augustana (SD) | 1 | – | 4 | – | 0 | 3 | – | 5 | – | 0 |
$ – Conference champion

The 1951 Iowa State Teachers Panthers football team was an American football team that represented Iowa State Teachers College (now known as the University of Northern Iowa) as a member of the North Central Conference (NCC) during the 1951 college football season. In their 14th season under head coach Clyde Starbeck, the Panthers compiled a 3–4 record (3–3 in conference games) and finished in third place in the NCC. In a 67–7 victory over Augustana (SD), the Panthers tallied 636 rushing yards and scored 10 rushing touchdowns, both of which set school records that remain unbroken as of 2026.

Three I.S.C. players were named to the all-NCC team: halfback Leland Crew, center Lou Bohnsack, and end Mahlon Kaylor.

The team played its home games at O. R. Latham Stadium in Cedar Falls, Iowa.

== Schedule ==
| Date | Opponent | Site | Result | Attendance | Source |
|---|---|---|---|---|---|
| September 15 | at South Dakota State | State Field; Brookings, SD | L 6–48 | | |
| September 22 | North Dakota | O. R. Latham Stadium; Cedar Falls, IA | W 49–19 | 3,500 | |
| September 28 | North Dakota State | Dacotah Field; Fargo, ND | L 14–27 | | |
| October 6 | at Drake* | Drake Stadium; Des Moines, IA (rivalry) | L 6–39 | < 2,000 | |
| October 20 | Augustana (SD) | O. R. Latham Stadium; Cedar Falls, IA | W 67–7 | 1,500 | |
| October 27 | Morningside^{†} | O. R. Latham Stadium; Cedar Falls, IA | W 27–7 | 7,000 | |
| November 3 | at South Dakota | Inman Field; Vermillion, SD | L 7–25 | 500 | |
*Non-conference game; ^{†}Homecoming
