= 1958 North Dakota Fighting Sioux football team =

American college football season

1958 North Dakota Fighting Sioux football

NCC champion
- Conference: North Central Conference
- Record: 5–3 (5–1 NCC)
- Head coach: Marvin C. Helling (2nd season)
- Home stadium: Memorial Stadium

1958 North Central Conference football standings
	Conf.					Overall
Team	W		L		T	W		L		T
North Dakota $	5	–	1	–	0	5	–	3	–	0
South Dakota	4	–	2	–	0	5	–	4	–	0
Augustana (SD)	3	–	3	–	0	5	–	3	–	0
Morningside	3	–	3	–	0	4	–	4	–	0
South Dakota State	3	–	3	–	0	4	–	5	–	0
North Dakota State	2	–	4	–	0	3	–	6	–	0
Iowa State Teachers	1	–	5	–	0	4	–	5	–	0
$ – Conference champion

The 1958 North Dakota Fighting Sioux football team, also known as the Nodaks, was an American football team that represented the University of North Dakota in the North Central Conference (NCC) during the 1958 college football season. In its second year under head coach Marvin C. Helling, the team compiled a 5–3 record (5–1 against NCC opponents), finished in sixth place out of seven teams in the NCC, and outscored opponents by a total of 157 to 85. The team played its home games at Memorial Stadium in Grand Forks, North Dakota.

== Schedule ==
Date	Opponent	Site	Result	Attendance	Source
September 13	at Bemidji State*	Bemidji, MN	L 6–13		
September 20	Montana State*	Memorial Stadium; Grand Forks, ND	L 8–15		
September 27	at Morningside	Sioux City, IA	W 25–8		
October 4	South Dakota	Memorial Stadium; Grand Forks, ND (rivalry)	W 28–14		
October 11	at South Dakota State	Brookings, SD (Hobo Day)	W 30–12	8,500–9,500	
October 18	North Dakota State	Memorial Stadium; Grand Forks, ND (rivalry)	W 36–0		
October 25	Iowa State Teachers	Memorial Stadium; Grand Forks, ND	W 14–0		
November 1	at Augustana (SD)	Sioux Falls, SD	L 10–23		
*Non-conference game
