= 1952 North Dakota State Bison football team =

American college football season

1952 North Dakota State Bison football
- Conference: North Central Conference
- Record: 5–4 (4–2 NCC)
- Head coach: Mac Wenskunas (3rd season)
- Home stadium: Dacotah Field

1952 North Central Conference football standings
| | Conf. | | | | | Overall |
| Team | W | | L | | T | W | | L | | T |
|---|---|---|---|---|---|---|---|---|---|---|
| Iowa State Teachers $ | 5 | – | 1 | – | 0 | 6 | – | 2 | – | 0 |
| North Dakota State | 4 | – | 2 | – | 0 | 5 | – | 4 | – | 0 |
| South Dakota | 3 | – | 2 | – | 1 | 4 | – | 3 | – | 1 |
| South Dakota State | 3 | – | 2 | – | 1 | 4 | – | 4 | – | 1 |
| Morningside | 3 | – | 3 | – | 0 | 5 | – | 3 | – | 0 |
| North Dakota | 2 | – | 4 | – | 0 | 3 | – | 6 | – | 0 |
| Augustana (SD) | 0 | – | 6 | – | 0 | 0 | – | 9 | – | 0 |
$ – Conference champion

The 1952 North Dakota State Bison football team was an American football team that represented North Dakota State University during the 1952 college football season as a member of the North Central Conference. In their third year under head coach Mac Wenskunas, the team compiled a 5–4 record.

== Schedule ==
| Date | Opponent | Site | Result | Attendance | Source |
|---|---|---|---|---|---|
| September 13 | Concordia–Moorhead* | Dacotah Field; Fargo, ND | W 12–0 | | |
| September 19 | Augustana (SD) | Dacotah Field; Fargo, ND | W 24–13 | | |
| September 27 | at Iowa State Teachers | O. R. Latham Stadium; Cedar Falls, IA | L 0–32 | 5,200 | |
| October 3 | Morningside | Dacotah Field; Fargo, ND | L 0–12 | | |
| October 11 | South Dakota State^{†} | Dacotah Field; Fargo, ND (rivalry) | W 48–14 | | |
| October 18 | at Idaho* | Neale Stadium; Moscow, ID | L 9–54 | 11,000 | |
| October 25 | at North Dakota | Memorial Stadium; Grand Forks, ND (Nickel Trophy) | W 14–13 | | |
| October 30 | at Bradley* | Peoria, IL | L 13–29 | | |
| November 8 | at South Dakota | Inman Field; Vermillion, SD | W 33–7 | | |
*Non-conference game; ^{†}Homecoming
