= 1952 South Dakota State Jackrabbits football team =

American college football season

1952 South Dakota State Jackrabbits football
- Conference: North Central Conference
- Record: 4–4–1 (3–2–1 NCC)
- Head coach: Ralph Ginn (6th season)

1952 North Central Conference football standings
	Conf.					Overall
Team	W		L		T	W		L		T
Iowa State Teachers $	5	–	1	–	0	6	–	2	–	0
North Dakota State	4	–	2	–	0	5	–	4	–	0
South Dakota	3	–	2	–	1	4	–	3	–	1
South Dakota State	3	–	2	–	1	4	–	4	–	1
Morningside	3	–	3	–	0	5	–	3	–	0
North Dakota	2	–	4	–	0	3	–	6	–	0
Augustana (SD)	0	–	6	–	0	0	–	9	–	0
$ – Conference champion

The 1952 South Dakota State Jackrabbits football team was an American football team that represented South Dakota State University in the North Central Conference during the 1952 college football season. In its sixth season under head coach Ralph Ginn, the team compiled a 4–4–1 record and outscored opponents by a total of 287 to 230.

== Schedule ==
Date	Opponent	Site	Result	Attendance	Source
September 13	La Crosse State*	Brookings, SD	L 6–13	< 2,000	
September 20	Iowa State*	Clyde Williams Field; Ames, IA	L 19–57	10,241	
September 27	St. Cloud Teachers*	Brookings, SD	W 47–7		
October 3	Augustana (SD)	Brookings, SD	W 47–6		
October 11	at North Dakota State	Dacotah Field; Fargo, ND (rivalry)	L 14–48		
October 18	North Dakota	Brookings, SD (Hobo Day)	W 60–6	8,000	
October 25	at South Dakota	Inman Field; Vermillion, SD (Dakota Day, rivalry)	T 21–21	10,000	
November 1	Morningside	Brookings, SD	W 39–25		
November 8	at Iowa State Teachers	O. R. Latham Stadium; Cedar Falls, IA	L 34–47	2,500	
*Non-conference game
