= 1959 South Dakota State Jackrabbits football team =

American college football season

1959 South Dakota State Jackrabbits football
- Conference: North Central Conference
- Record: 2–7 (2–4 NCC)
- Head coach: Ralph Ginn (13th season)
- Home stadium: State Field

1959 North Central Conference football standings
	Conf.					Overall
Team	W		L		T	W		L		T
Augustana (SD) $	4	–	1	–	1	6	–	2	–	1
North Dakota State	3	–	2	–	1	4	–	4	–	1
South Dakota	3	–	2	–	1	4	–	5	–	1
Iowa State Teachers	3	–	3	–	0	6	–	3	–	0
Morningside	3	–	3	–	0	5	–	4	–	0
South Dakota State	2	–	4	–	0	2	–	7	–	0
North Dakota	1	–	4	–	1	2	–	5	–	1
$ – Conference champion

The 1959 South Dakota State Jackrabbits football team was an American football team that represented South Dakota State University in the North Central Conference during the 1959 college football season. In its 13th season under head coach Ralph Ginn, the team compiled a 2–7 record, finished in sixth place out of seven teams in the NCC, and was outscored by a total of 153 to 80.

== Schedule ==
Date	Opponent	Site	Result	Attendance	Source
September 12	Montana State*	State Field; Brookings, SD	L 0–27	3,500	
September 19	Colorado State–Greeley*	State Field; Brookings, SD	L 0–22	4,200	
September 26	Kansas State*	State Field; Brookings, SD	L 12–28	4,500	
October 3	at Augustana (SD)	Howard Wood Field; Sioux Falls, SD	L 0–13	5,500	
October 10	North Dakota	Memorial Stadium; Grand Forks, ND	W 6–0	4,912 –5,000	
October 17	South Dakota^{†}	State Field; Brookings, SD (Hobo Day, rivalry)	W 12–7	8,500–9,000	
October 24	North Dakota State	State Field; Brookings, SD (rivalry)	L 6–8	4,500	
October 31	at Morningside	Sioux City, IA	L 32–34	3,000	
November 7	Iowa State Teachers	State Field; Brookings, SD	L 12–14	1,850	
*Non-conference game; ^{†}Homecoming
