= 1951 North Dakota Fighting Sioux football team =

American college football season

1951 North Dakota Fighting Sioux football
- Conference: North Central Conference
- Record: 2–4 (2–3 NCC)
- Head coach: Frank Zazula (2nd season)
- Home stadium: Memorial Stadium

1951 North Central Conference football standings
| | Conf. | | | | | Overall |
| Team | W | | L | | T | W | | L | | T |
|---|---|---|---|---|---|---|---|---|---|---|
| South Dakota $ | 6 | – | 0 | – | 0 | 7 | – | 1 | – | 0 |
| South Dakota State | 4 | – | 1 | – | 1 | 8 | – | 1 | – | 1 |
| Iowa State Teachers | 3 | – | 3 | – | 0 | 3 | – | 4 | – | 0 |
| North Dakota | 2 | – | 3 | – | 0 | 2 | – | 4 | – | 0 |
| Morningside | 2 | – | 4 | – | 0 | 3 | – | 5 | – | 1 |
| North Dakota State | 1 | – | 4 | – | 1 | 1 | – | 5 | – | 1 |
| Augustana (SD) | 1 | – | 4 | – | 0 | 3 | – | 5 | – | 0 |
$ – Conference champion

The 1951 North Dakota Fighting Sioux football team, also known as the Nodaks, was an American football team that represented the University of North Dakota in the North Central Conference (NCC) during the 1951 college football season. In its second year under head coach Frank Zazula, the team compiled a 2–4 record (2–2 against NCC opponents), finished in fourth place out of seven teams in the NCC, and was outscored by a total of 162 to 105. The team played its home games at Memorial Stadium in Grand Forks, North Dakota.

== Schedule ==
| Date | Opponent | Site | Result | Source |
|---|---|---|---|---|
| September 22 | at Iowa State Teachers | Cedar Falls, IA | L 19–49 | |
| September 29 | Morningside | Memorial Stadium; Grand Forks, ND | W 21–16 | |
| October 13 | South Dakota State | Memorial Stadium; Grand Forks, ND | L 12–21 | |
| October 20 | Beloit* | Memorial Stadium; Grand Forks, ND | L 7–27 | |
| October 27 | at North Dakota State | Fargo, ND (rivalry) | W 33–14 | |
| November 10 | at South Dakota | Vermillion, SD (rivalry) | L 13–35 | |
*Non-conference game
