= 1961 South Dakota Coyotes football team =

American college football season

1961 South Dakota Coyotes football
- Conference: North Central Conference
- Record: 1–8 (0–6 NCC)
- Head coach: Ralph Stewart (6th season)
- Home stadium: Inman Field

1961 North Central Conference football standings
	Conf.					Overall
Team	W		L		T	W		L		T
South Dakota State +	5	–	1	–	0	8	–	2	–	0
State College of Iowa +	5	–	1	–	0	7	–	2	–	0
North Dakota	4	–	2	–	0	6	–	3	–	0
Augustana (SD)	4	–	2	–	0	5	–	3	–	1
Morningside	2	–	4	–	0	3	–	6	–	0
North Dakota State	1	–	5	–	0	3	–	6	–	0
South Dakota	0	–	6	–	0	1	–	8	–	0
+ – Conference co-champions

The 1961 South Dakota Coyotes football team was an American football team that represented the University of South Dakota in the North Central Conference (NCC) during the 1961 college football season. In its sixth season under head coach Ralph Stewart, the team compiled a 1–8 record (0–6 against NCC opponents), finished in seventh place out of seven teams in the NCC, and was outscored by a total of 245 to 126. In the final game of the season, the Coyotes snapped an 11-game losing streak dating back to October 29, 1960. The team played its home games at Inman Field in Vermillion, South Dakota.

== Schedule ==
Date	Opponent	Site	Result	Attendance	Source
September 16	Arkansas State*	Inman Field; Vermillion, SD	L 9–21	1,500–3,000	
September 23	at North Dakota State	Dacotah Field; Fargo, ND	L 12–41		
September 30	Augustana (SD)	Inman Field; Vermillion, SD	L 20–22	4,000	
October 7	North Dakota	Inman Field; Vermillion, SD (rivalry)	L 7–21	2,000–3,000	
October 14	Morningside	Inman Field; Vermillion, SD (Dakota Day)	L 12–27	7,500	
October 21	at South Dakota State	Brookings, SD (rivalry, Hobo Day)	L 6–34	5,000–7,500	
October 27	Saint Mary (KS)	Inman Field; Vermillion, SD	L 37–38	3,000	
November 4	at State College of Iowa	O. R. Latham Stadium; Cedar Falls, IA	L 7–27		
November 11	at Colorado State–Greeley*	Greeley, CO	W 16–14		
*Non-conference game
