= 1958 North Dakota State Bison football team =

American college football season

1958 North Dakota State Bison football
- Conference: North Central Conference
- Record: 3–6 (2–4 NCC)
- Head coach: Bob Danielson (2nd season)
- Home stadium: Dacotah Field

1958 North Central Conference football standings
	Conf.					Overall
Team	W		L		T	W		L		T
North Dakota $	5	–	1	–	0	5	–	3	–	0
South Dakota	4	–	2	–	0	5	–	4	–	0
Augustana (SD)	3	–	3	–	0	5	–	3	–	0
Morningside	3	–	3	–	0	4	–	4	–	0
South Dakota State	3	–	3	–	0	4	–	5	–	0
North Dakota State	2	–	4	–	0	3	–	6	–	0
Iowa State Teachers	1	–	5	–	0	4	–	5	–	0
$ – Conference champion

The 1958 North Dakota State Bison football team was an American football team that represented North Dakota State University during the 1958 college football season as a member of the North Central Conference. In their second year under head coach Bob Danielson, the team compiled a 3–6 record.

== Schedule ==
Date	Opponent	Site	Result	Attendance	Source
September 13	Concordia–Moorhead*	Dacotah Field; Fargo, ND	W 8–6		
September 20	Augustana (SD)	Dacotah Field; Fargo, ND	W 30–28		
September 27	at Iowa State Teachers	O. R. Latham Stadium; Cedar Falls, IA	L 11–21		
October 4	Morningside	Dacotah Field; Fargo, ND	L 0–12		
October 11	Montana State*^{†}	Dacotah Field; Fargo, ND	L 20–33	5,000	
October 18	at North Dakota	Memorial Stadium; Grand Forks, ND (Nickel Trophy)	L 0–36		
October 25	South Dakota State	Dacotah Field; Fargo, ND (rivlary)	W 33–20	1,000	
November 1	at Trinity (TX)*	Alamo Stadium; San Antonio, TX	L 6–80	2,359	
November 8	at South Dakota	Inman Field; Vermillion, SD	L 8–13		
*Non-conference game; ^{†}Homecoming
