= 1952 North Dakota Fighting Sioux football team =

American college football season

1952 North Dakota Fighting Sioux football
- Conference: North Central Conference
- Record: 3–6 (2–4 NCC)
- Head coach: Frank Zazula (3rd season)
- Home stadium: Memorial Stadium

1952 North Central Conference football standings
	Conf.					Overall
Team	W		L		T	W		L		T
Iowa State Teachers $	5	–	1	–	0	6	–	2	–	0
North Dakota State	4	–	2	–	0	5	–	4	–	0
South Dakota	3	–	2	–	1	4	–	3	–	1
South Dakota State	3	–	2	–	1	4	–	4	–	1
Morningside	3	–	3	–	0	5	–	3	–	0
North Dakota	2	–	4	–	0	3	–	6	–	0
Augustana (SD)	0	–	6	–	0	0	–	9	–	0
$ – Conference champion

The 1952 North Dakota Fighting Sioux football team, also known as the Nodaks, was an American football team that represented the University of North Dakota in the North Central Conference (NCC) during the 1952 college football season. In its third year under head coach Frank Zazula, the team compiled a 3–6 record (2–4 against NCC opponents), finished in sixth place out of seven teams in the NCC, and was outscored by a total of 224 to 131. The team played its home games at Memorial Stadium in Grand Forks, North Dakota.

== Schedule ==
Date	Opponent	Site	Result	Attendance	Source
September 20	at Bemidji State*	Bemidji, MN	W 31–0		
September 27	at North Texas State*	Eagle Stadium; Denton, TX	L 0–55		
October 4	South Dakota	Memorial Stadium; Grand Forks, ND (rivalry)	L 14–21		
October 11	Iowa State Teachers	Memorial Stadium; Grand Forks, ND	L 14–27		
October 18	at South Dakota State	Brookings, SD (Hobo Day)	L 6–60	8,000	
October 25	North Dakota State	Memorial Stadium; Grand Forks, ND (rivalry)	L 13–14		
November 1	at Augustana (SD)	Sioux Falls, SD	W 33–21		
November 8	at Morningside	Sioux City, IA	W 20–6		
November 15	at Beloit	Beloit, WI	L 0–20		
*Non-conference game
