= 1953 North Dakota Fighting Sioux football team =

American college football season

1953 North Dakota Fighting Sioux football
- Conference: North Central Conference
- Record: 6–1–1 (3–1–1 NCC)
- Head coach: Frank Zazula (4th season)
- Home stadium: Memorial Stadium

1953 North Central Conference football standings
	Conf.					Overall
Team	W		L		T	W		L		T
South Dakota State $	5	–	0	–	1	5	–	3	–	1
Iowa State Teachers	5	–	1	–	0	6	–	3	–	0
North Dakota	4	–	1	–	1	6	–	1	–	1
Morningside	2	–	4	–	0	3	–	5	–	0
North Dakota State	2	–	4	–	0	3	–	5	–	0
South Dakota	2	–	4	–	0	2	–	6	–	0
Augustana (SD)	0	–	6	–	0	1	–	8	–	0
$ – Conference champion

The 1953 North Dakota Fighting Sioux football team, also known as the Nodaks, was an American football team that represented the University of North Dakota in the North Central Conference (NCC) during the 1953 college football season. In its fourth year under head coach Frank Zazula, the team compiled a 6–1–1 record (3–1–1 against NCC opponents), finished in third place out of seven teams in the NCC, and outscored opponents by a total of 154 to 107. The team played its home games at Memorial Stadium in Grand Forks, North Dakota.

== Schedule ==
Date	Opponent	Site	Result	Attendance	Source
September 19	at Bemidji State*	Bemidji, MN	W 21–13		
September 26	Augustana (SD)	Memorial Stadium; Grand Forks, ND	W 35–0		
October 3	South Dakota State	Memorial Stadium; Grand Forks, ND	T 13–13		
October 10	Morningside	Memorial Stadium; Grand Forks, ND	W 21–20		
October 17	Iowa State Teachers	Memorial Stadium; Grand Forks, ND	L 6–34		
October 24	Montana State*	Memorial Stadium; Grand Forks, ND	W 14–7		
October 31	at North Dakota State	Fargo, ND	W 26–6		
November 14	at South Dakota	Vermillion, SD	W 18–14		
*Non-conference game
