= 1959 Iowa State Teachers Panthers football team =

American college football season

1959 Iowa State Teachers Panthers football
- Conference: North Central Conference
- Record: 6–3 (3–3 NCC)
- Head coach: Willard Hammer (2nd season)
- Home stadium: O. R. Latham Stadium

1959 North Central Conference football standings
	Conf.					Overall
Team	W		L		T	W		L		T
Augustana (SD) $	4	–	1	–	1	6	–	2	–	1
North Dakota State	3	–	2	–	1	4	–	4	–	1
South Dakota	3	–	2	–	1	4	–	5	–	1
Iowa State Teachers	3	–	3	–	0	6	–	3	–	0
Morningside	3	–	3	–	0	5	–	4	–	0
South Dakota State	2	–	4	–	0	2	–	7	–	0
North Dakota	1	–	4	–	1	2	–	5	–	1
$ – Conference champion

The 1959 Iowa State Teachers Panthers football team represented Iowa State Teachers College (later renamed University of Northern Iowa) as a member of the North Central Conference (NCC) during the 1959 college football season. In its second season under head coach Willard Hammer, the team compiled a 6–3 record (3–3 in conference games) and tied for fourth place in the NCC.

Three S.C.I. players were named to the all-NCC team: halfback Warren Hansen; tackle Dennis Remmert; and guard John Sullivan.

The team played its home games at O. R. Latham Stadium in Cedar Falls, Iowa.

== Schedule ==
Date	Opponent	Site	Result	Attendance	Source
September 12	at Bradley*	Peoria Stadium; Peoria, IL	W 22–15	3,500	
September 19	Mankato State*	O. R. Latham Stadium; Cedar Falls, IA	W 21–0	6,500	
September 26	at North Dakota State	Dacotah Field; Fargo, ND	L 22–32		
October 2	at Drake*	Drake Stadium; Des Moines, IA	W 14–6		
October 9	Augustana (SD)	O. R. Latham Stadium; Cedar Falls, IA	L 6–7		
October 16	Morningside	O. R. Latham Stadium; Cedar Falls, IA	W 22–14		
October 24	North Dakota	O. R. Latham Stadium; Cedar Falls, IA	W 14–9		
October 31	South Dakota	O. R. Latham Stadium; Cedar Falls, IA	L 6–27		
November 7	at South Dakota State	State Field; Brookings, SD	W 14–12	1,850	
*Non-conference game
