= 1960 North Dakota Fighting Sioux football team =

American college football season

1960 North Dakota Fighting Sioux football
- Conference: North Central Conference
- Record: 4–3–1 (4–1 NCC)
- Head coach: Marvin C. Helling (4th season)
- Home stadium: Memorial Stadium

1960 North Central Conference football standings
	Conf.					Overall
Team	W		L		T	W		L		T
Iowa State Teachers $	6	–	0	–	0	9	–	1	–	0
Augustana (SD)	4	–	2	–	0	6	–	2	–	0
North Dakota	4	–	2	–	0	4	–	3	–	1
South Dakota State	2	–	3	–	1	5	–	4	–	1
North Dakota State	2	–	3	–	1	3	–	5	–	1
Morningside	2	–	4	–	0	4	–	5	–	0
South Dakota	0	–	6	–	0	1	–	8	–	0
$ – Conference champion

The 1960 North Dakota Fighting Sioux football team, also known as the Nodaks, was an American football team that represented the University of North Dakota in the North Central Conference (NCC) during the 1960 college football season. In its fourth year under head coach Marvin C. Helling, the team compiled a 4–3–1 record (4–1 against NCC opponents), finished in third place out of seven teams in the NCC, and outscored opponents by a total of 145 to 112. The team played its home games at Memorial Stadium in Grand Forks, North Dakota.

== Schedule ==
Date	Opponent	Site	Result	Attendance	Source
September 10	Montana	Memorial Stadium; Grand Forks, ND	L 14–21	4,879	
September 17	Montana State	Memorial Stadium; Grand Forks, ND	T 6–6	5,621	
September 24	at Morningside	Public Schools Stadium; Sioux Falls, IA	W 34–13	5,241	
October 1	South Dakota	Memorial Stadium; Grand Forks, ND (rivalry)	W 27–7	5,569–5,600	
October 8	at South Dakota State	State Field; Brookings, SD	W 27–23	7,000–8,000	
October 15	North Dakota State^{†}	Memorial Stadium; Grand Forks, ND (Nickel Trophy)	W 16–7	9,000–9,139	
October 22	No. 4 Iowa State Teachers	Memorial Stadium; Grand Forks, ND	L 3–7	4,596	
October 29	at Augustana (SD)	Sioux Falls, SD	L 18–28	3,400	
^{†}Homecoming; Rankings from AP Poll released prior to the game
