= 1958 South Dakota Coyotes football team =

American college football season

1958 South Dakota Coyotes football
- Conference: North Central Conference
- Record: 5–4 (4–2 NCC)
- Head coach: Ralph Stewart (3rd season)
- Home stadium: Inman Field

1958 North Central Conference football standings
	Conf.					Overall
Team	W		L		T	W		L		T
North Dakota $	5	–	1	–	0	5	–	3	–	0
South Dakota	4	–	2	–	0	5	–	4	–	0
Augustana (SD)	3	–	3	–	0	5	–	3	–	0
Morningside	3	–	3	–	0	4	–	4	–	0
South Dakota State	3	–	3	–	0	4	–	5	–	0
North Dakota State	2	–	4	–	0	3	–	6	–	0
Iowa State Teachers	1	–	5	–	0	4	–	5	–	0
$ – Conference champion

The 1958 South Dakota Coyotes football team was an American football team that represented the University of South Dakota as a member of the North Central Conference (NCC) during the 1958 college football season. In their third season under head coach Ralph Stewart, the Coyotes compiled a 5–4 record (4–2 against NCC opponents), finished in fourth place out of seven teams in the NCC, scored 137 points, and gave up 137 points. They played their home games at Inman Field in Vermillion, South Dakota.

== Schedule ==
Date	Opponent	Site	Result	Attendance	Source
September 13	Southeast Missouri State*	Inman Field; Vermillion, SD	L 2–6		
September 20	Northwest Missouri State*	Inman Field; Vermillion, SD	W 22–8		
September 27	at Augustana (SD)	Howard Wood Field; Sioux Falls, SD	L 12–13	5,783	
October 4	North Dakota	Memorial Stadium; Grand Forks, ND (rivalry)	L 14–28		
October 11	at Morningside	Public Schools Stadium; Sioux City, IA	W 8–0	5,500	
October 18	South Dakota State	Inman Field; Vermillion, SD (Dakota Day, rivalry)	W 28–7	9,500	
November 1	at Iowa State	Clyde Williams Field; Ames, IA	L 0–53	6,337	
November 8	North Dakota State	Inman Field; Vermillion, SD	W 13–8		
November 15	Iowa State Teachers	Inman Field; Vermillion, SD	W 38–14		
*Non-conference game; Source:
