= Glen Johnson (disambiguation) =

Glen Johnson (born 1984) is an English former footballer.

Glen Johnson may also refer to:

- Glen Johnson (boxer) (born 1969), Jamaican boxer
- Glen Johnson (footballer, born 1952), English footballer
- Glen Johnson (soccer) (born 1951), former Canadian soccer player
- Glen D. Johnson (1911–1983), U.S. Representative from Oklahoma
- Glen D. Johnson Jr. (born 1954), Chancellor of the Oklahoma State System of Higher Education
- Glen Johnson, a musician of the group Piano Magic

== See also ==
- Glenn Johnson (disambiguation)
- Glenroy T. Johnson, West Indian cricket umpire
