= 1959 South Dakota Coyotes football team =

American college football season

1959 South Dakota Coyotes football
- Conference: North Central Conference
- Record: 4–5–1 (3–2–1 NCC)
- Head coach: Ralph Stewart (4th season)
- Home stadium: Inman Field

1959 North Central Conference football standings
	Conf.					Overall
Team	W		L		T	W		L		T
Augustana (SD) $	4	–	1	–	1	6	–	2	–	1
North Dakota State	3	–	2	–	1	4	–	4	–	1
South Dakota	3	–	2	–	1	4	–	5	–	1
Iowa State Teachers	3	–	3	–	0	6	–	3	–	0
Morningside	3	–	3	–	0	5	–	4	–	0
South Dakota State	2	–	4	–	0	2	–	7	–	0
North Dakota	1	–	4	–	1	2	–	5	–	1
$ – Conference champion

The 1959 South Dakota Coyotes football team was an American football team that represented the University of South Dakota as a member of the North Central Conference (NCC) during the 1959 college football season. In their fourth season under head coach Ralph Stewart, the Coyotes compiled a 4–5–1 record (3–2–1 against NCC opponents), tied for second place out of seven teams in the NCC, and were outscored by a total of 213 to 190. They played their home games at Inman Field in Vermillion, South Dakota.

== Schedule ==
Date	Opponent	Site	Result	Attendance	Source
September 12	Lamar Tech*	Inman Field; Vermillion, SD	L 9–41	2,000	
September 19	at North Dakota State	Dacotah Field; Fargo, ND	T 22–22		
September 26	Augustana (SD)	Inman Field; Vermillion, SD	W 35–20	5,500	
October 3	North Dakota	Inman Field; Vermillion, SD	W 31–14	3,500	
October 10	Iowa State	Inman Field; Vermillion, SD	L 6–41	2,500–4,000	
October 17	at South Dakota State^{†}	State Field; Brookings, SD (Hobo Day)	L 7–12	8,500–9,000	
October 24	at Washington University*	Francis Field; St. Louis, MO	W 27–21	4,000	
October 31	at Iowa State Teachers	O. R. Latham Stadium; Cedar Falls, IA	W 27–6		
November 7	Morningside	Inman Field; Vermillion, SD	L 8–9	5,600	
November 14	at Colorado State–Greeley*	Greeley, CO	L 18–27		
*Non-conference game; ^{†}Homecoming
