= 1960 Iowa State Teachers Panthers football team =

American college football season

1960 Iowa State Teachers Panthers football

NCC champion

Mineral Water Bowl, L 6–17 vs. Hillsdale
- Conference: North Central Conference
- Record: 9–1 (6–0 NCC)
- Head coach: Stan Sheriff (1st season)
- Home stadium: O. R. Latham Stadium

1960 North Central Conference football standings
	Conf.					Overall
Team	W		L		T	W		L		T
Iowa State Teachers $	6	–	0	–	0	9	–	1	–	0
Augustana (SD)	4	–	2	–	0	6	–	2	–	0
North Dakota	4	–	2	–	0	4	–	3	–	1
South Dakota State	2	–	3	–	1	5	–	4	–	1
North Dakota State	2	–	3	–	1	3	–	5	–	1
Morningside	2	–	4	–	0	4	–	5	–	0
South Dakota	0	–	6	–	0	1	–	8	–	0
$ – Conference champion

The 1960 Iowa State Teachers Panthers football team represented Iowa State Teachers College (later renamed University of Northern Iowa) in the North Central Conference during the 1960 college football season. In its first season under head coach Stan Sheriff, the team compiled a 9–1 record (6–0 against NCC opponents) and won the NCC championship.

Five players received all-conference honors: guard George Asleson; quarterback Jerry Morgan; end Mace Reyerson; center Charles Schulte; and guard Wendell Williams. Asleson also received All-America honors from the Associated Press.

Reyerson set a team record, eclipsed 25 years later, with 127 interception return yards. The defense also set a team record on October 29 with seven interceptions against South Dakota.

== Schedule ==
Date	Opponent	Rank	Site	Result	Attendance	Source
September 17	at Mankato State*		Mankato, MN	W 41–16		
September 24	North Dakota State		O. R. Latham Stadium; Cedar Falls, IA	W 19–7	5,300	
October 1	Drake*		O. R. Latham Stadium; Cedar Falls, IA	W 14–3	6,500	
October 8	Augustana (SD)		O. R. Latham Stadium; Cedar Falls, IA	W 27–7		
October 15	Morningside		O. R. Latham Stadium; Cedar Falls, IA	W 26–0		
October 22	at North Dakota	No. 4	Grand Forks, ND	W 7–0	4,596	
October 29	at South Dakota	No. 9	Inman Field; Vermillion, SD	W 40–0	1,500	
November 5	South Dakota State	No. 4	O. R. Latham Stadium; Cedar Falls, IA	W 12–0	1,800	
November 12	at Wheaton (IL)*	No. 5	Wheaton, IL	W 21–18		
November 26	Hillsdale*	No. 3	Tiger Stadium; Excelsior Springs, MO (Mineral Water Bowl)	L 6–17		
*Non-conference game; Rankings from AP Poll released prior to the game
