= 1960 North Dakota State Bison football team =

American college football season

1960 North Dakota State Bison football
- Conference: North Central Conference
- Record: 3–5–1 (2–3–1 NCC)
- Head coach: Bob Danielson (4th season)
- Home stadium: Dacotah Field

1960 North Central Conference football standings
	Conf.					Overall
Team	W		L		T	W		L		T
Iowa State Teachers $	6	–	0	–	0	9	–	1	–	0
Augustana (SD)	4	–	2	–	0	6	–	2	–	0
North Dakota	4	–	2	–	0	4	–	3	–	1
South Dakota State	2	–	3	–	1	5	–	4	–	1
North Dakota State	2	–	3	–	1	3	–	5	–	1
Morningside	2	–	4	–	0	4	–	5	–	0
South Dakota	0	–	6	–	0	1	–	8	–	0
$ – Conference champion

The 1960 North Dakota State Bison football team was an American football team that represented North Dakota State University during the 1960 college football season as a member of the North Central Conference. In their fourth year under head coach Bob Danielson, the team compiled a 3–5–1 record.

== Schedule ==
Date	Opponent	Site	Result	Attendance	Source
September 10	Concordia–Moorhead*	Dacotah Field; Fargo, ND	L 12–32	6,000	
September 17	Augustana (SD)	Dacotah Field; Fargo, ND	L 21–28	6,000	
September 24	at Iowa State Teachers	O. R. Latham Stadium; Cedar Falls, IA	L 7–19	5,000–5,300	
October 1	Morningside	Dacotah Field; Fargo, ND	W 21–15	4,000	
October 15	at North Dakota	Memorial Stadium; Grand Forks, ND (Nickel Trophy)	L 7–16	9,000–9,139	
October 22	South Dakota State^{†}	Dacotah Field; Fargo, ND (rivalry)	T 14–14	4,000	
October 29	at Montana State*	Gatton Field; Bozeman, MT	L 14–26	2,000	
November 5	at South Dakota	Inman Field; Vermillion, SD	W 40–7	1,000	
November 12	Mankato State*	Dacotah Field; Fargo, ND	W 21–0	1,000	
*Non-conference game; ^{†}Homecoming
