= 1960 South Dakota State Jackrabbits football team =

American college football season

1960 South Dakota State Jackrabbits football
- Conference: North Central Conference
- Record: 5–4–1 (2–3–1 NCC)
- Head coach: Ralph Ginn (14th season)
- Home stadium: State Field

1960 North Central Conference football standings
	Conf.					Overall
Team	W		L		T	W		L		T
Iowa State Teachers $	6	–	0	–	0	9	–	1	–	0
Augustana (SD)	4	–	2	–	0	6	–	2	–	0
North Dakota	4	–	2	–	0	4	–	3	–	1
South Dakota State	2	–	3	–	1	5	–	4	–	1
North Dakota State	2	–	3	–	1	3	–	5	–	1
Morningside	2	–	4	–	0	4	–	5	–	0
South Dakota	0	–	6	–	0	1	–	8	–	0
$ – Conference champion

The 1960 South Dakota State Jackrabbits football team was an American football team that represented South Dakota State University in the North Central Conference during the 1960 college football season. In its 14th season under head coach Ralph Ginn, the team compiled a 5–4–1 record, finished in fourth place out of seven teams in the NCC, and was outscored by a total of 170 to 135.

== Schedule ==
Date	Opponent	Site	Result	Attendance	Source
September 10	Bemidji State*	State Field; Brookings, SD	W 22–6	4,000	
September 17	at Kansas State*	Memorial Stadium; Manhattan, KS	L 6–20	11,000	
September 24	Montana State*	State Field; Brookings, SD	W 20–14	5,000	
October 1	Augustana (SD)	State Field; Brookings, SD	L 20–21	7,000	
October 8	North Dakota	State Field; Brookings, SD	L 23–27	7,000–8,000	
October 15	at South Dakota	Inman Field; Vermillion, SD (rivalry, Dakota Day)	W 28–7	8,500	
October 22	at North Dakota State	Dacotah Field; Fargo, ND (rivalry)	T 14–14	4,000	
October 29	Morningside	State Field; Brookings, SD	W 22–0	1,000	
November 5	at No. 5 Iowa State Teachers	O. R. Latham Stadium; Cedar Falls, IA	L 0–12	1,800	
November 12	at Colorado State–Greeley*	Greeley, CO	W 15–14	2,000	
*Non-conference game; Rankings from AP Poll released prior to the game
