= 1953 South Dakota State Jackrabbits football team =

American college football season

1953 South Dakota State Jackrabbits football

NCC champion
- Conference: North Central Conference
- Record: 5–3–1 (5–0–1 NCC)
- Head coach: Ralph Ginn (7th season)
- Home stadium: State Field

1953 North Central Conference football standings
	Conf.					Overall
Team	W		L		T	W		L		T
South Dakota State $	5	–	0	–	1	5	–	3	–	1
Iowa State Teachers	5	–	1	–	0	6	–	3	–	0
North Dakota	4	–	1	–	1	6	–	1	–	1
Morningside	2	–	4	–	0	3	–	5	–	0
North Dakota State	2	–	4	–	0	3	–	5	–	0
South Dakota	2	–	4	–	0	2	–	6	–	0
Augustana (SD)	0	–	6	–	0	1	–	8	–	0
$ – Conference champion

The 1953 South Dakota State Jackrabbits football team was an American football team that represented South Dakota State University in the North Central Conference during the 1953 college football season. In its seventh season under head coach Ralph Ginn, the team compiled a 5–3–1 record (5–0–1 against conference opponents), won the NCC championship, and outscored opponents by a total of 247 to 186.

== Schedule ==
Date	Opponent	Site	Result	Attendance	Source
September 19	at Marquette*	Marquette Stadium; Milwaukee, MI	L 13–46	13,500	
September 26	Iowa State Teachers	State Field; Brookings, SD	W 52–19		
October 3	at North Dakota	Memorial Stadium; Grand Forks, ND	T 13–13		
October 10	at Augustana (SD)	Sioux Falls, SD	W 55–0		
October 17	Saint John's (MN)*	State Field; Brookings, SD (Hobo Day)	L 13–26		
October 24	North Dakota State	State Field; Brookings, SD (rivalry)	W 32–14	7,500	
October 31	South Dakota	State Field; Brookings, SD (Little Brown Jug)	W 25–0	4,000–5,000	
November 7	at Morningside	Sioux City, IA	W 31–29		
November 14	at Wichita*	Veterans Field; Wichita, KS	L 13–39		
*Non-conference game
