= 1924 North Dakota Flickertails football team =

American college football season

1924 North Dakota Flickertails football
- Conference: North Central Conference
- Record: 2–8 (1–4 NCC)
- Head coach: Paul J. Davis (6th season)

1924 North Central Conference football standings
	Conf.					Overall
Team	W		L		T	W		L		T
South Dakota State $	5	–	0	–	0	7	–	1	–	0
South Dakota	4	–	1	–	0	6	–	2	–	0
Creighton	3	–	1	–	0	6	–	1	–	2
North Dakota Agricultural	3	–	3	–	0	5	–	3	–	0
Nebraska Wesleyan	1	–	2	–	0	2	–	4	–	2
Des Moines	1	–	3	–	0	2	–	6	–	0
Morningside	1	–	4	–	0	2	–	5	–	0
North Dakota	1	–	4	–	0	3	–	3	–	0
St. Thomas (MN)	0	–	1	–	0	5	–	2	–	0
$ – Conference champion

The 1924 North Dakota Flickertails football team, also known as the Nodaks, was an American football team that represented the University of North Dakota as a member of the North Central Conference (NCC) during the 1924 college football season. In their sixth year under head coach Paul J. Davis, the Flickertails compiled a 2–8 record (1–4 against NCC opponents), finished in a tie for seventh place out of nine teams in the NCC, and were outscored by a total of 167 to 32.

== Schedule ==
Date	Opponent	Site	Result	Attendance	Source
September 20	Grand Forks American Legion*	Grand Forks, ND	W 6–0		
September 27	at Wisconsin*	Camp Randall Stadium; Madison, WI	L 0–25		
October 4	at Minnesota*	Memorial Stadium; Minneapolis, MN	L 0–14	16,000	
October 11	at South Dakota	Vermillion, SD (rivalry)	L 0–6	5,000	
October 18	South Dakota State	Grand Forks, ND	L 6–7		
October 25	Nebraska Wesleyan	Grand Forks, ND	W 13–7		
November 1	at North Dakota Agricultural	Dacotah Field; Fargo, ND (rivalry)	L 7–20		
November 8	at Creighton	Western League Park; Omaha, NE	L 0–34		
November 16	at Marquette*	Marquette Stadium; Milwaukee, WI	L 0–26		
November 27	at John Carroll*	Cleveland	L 0–28		
*Non-conference game
