= 1960 South Dakota Coyotes football team =

American college football season

1960 South Dakota Coyotes football
- Conference: North Central Conference
- Record: 1–8 (0–6 NCC)
- Head coach: Ralph Stewart (5th season)
- Home stadium: Inman Field

1960 North Central Conference football standings
	Conf.					Overall
Team	W		L		T	W		L		T
Iowa State Teachers $	6	–	0	–	0	9	–	1	–	0
Augustana (SD)	4	–	2	–	0	6	–	2	–	0
North Dakota	4	–	2	–	0	4	–	3	–	1
South Dakota State	2	–	3	–	1	5	–	4	–	1
North Dakota State	2	–	3	–	1	3	–	5	–	1
Morningside	2	–	4	–	0	4	–	5	–	0
South Dakota	0	–	6	–	0	1	–	8	–	0
$ – Conference champion

The 1960 South Dakota Coyotes football team was an American football team that represented the University of South Dakota in the North Central Conference (NCC) during the 1960 college football season. In its fifth season under head coach Ralph Stewart, the team compiled a 1–8 record (0–6 against NCC opponents), finished in seventh place out of seven teams in the NCC, and was outscored by a total of 226 to 62. The team played its home games at Inman Field in Vermillion, South Dakota.

== Schedule ==
Date	Opponent	Site	Result	Attendance	Source
September 17	Colorado State–Greeley*	Inman Field; Vermillion, SD	L 7–16	4,000	
September 24	at Augustana (SD)	Sioux Falls, SD	L 0–21	8,000	
October 1	at North Dakota	Grand Forks, ND (rivalry)	L 7–27	5,569–5,600	
October 8	at Morningside	Sioux City, IA	L 6–7		
October 15	South Dakota State	Inman Field; Vermillion, SD (rivalry, Dakota Day)	L 7–28	8,500	
October 22	Washington University*	Inman Field; Vermillion, SD	W 7–6	2,500	
October 29	No. 9 Iowa State Teachers	Inman Field; Vermillion, SD	L 0–40	1,500	
November 5	North Dakota State	Inman Field; Vermillion, SD	L 7–40	1,000	
November 24	at Lamar Tech*	Greenie Stadium; Beaumont, TX	L 21–41		
*Non-conference game; Rankings from AP Poll released prior to the game
