= 1953 South Dakota Coyotes football team =

American college football season

1953 South Dakota Coyotes football
- Conference: North Central Conference
- Record: 2–6 (2–4 NCC)
- Head coach: Harry Gamage (15th season)
- Home stadium: Inman Field

1953 North Central Conference football standings
	Conf.					Overall
Team	W		L		T	W		L		T
South Dakota State $	5	–	0	–	1	5	–	3	–	1
Iowa State Teachers	5	–	1	–	0	6	–	3	–	0
North Dakota	4	–	1	–	1	6	–	1	–	1
Morningside	2	–	4	–	0	3	–	5	–	0
North Dakota State	2	–	4	–	0	3	–	5	–	0
South Dakota	2	–	4	–	0	2	–	6	–	0
Augustana (SD)	0	–	6	–	0	1	–	8	–	0
$ – Conference champion

The 1953 South Dakota Coyotes football team was an American football team that represented the University of South Dakota as a member of the North Central Conference (NCC) during the 1953 college football season. In their 15th season under head coach Harry Gamage, the Coyotes compiled a 2–6 record (2–4 against NCC opponents), tied for fifth place out of seven teams in the NCC, and were outscored by a total of 149 to 115. They played their home games at Inman Field in Vermillion, South Dakota.

== Schedule ==
Date	Opponent	Site	Result	Attendance	Source
September 19	at Iowa State*	Clyde Williams Field; Ames, IA	L 0–35	11,000	
October 3	at Augustana (SD)	Viking Field; Sioux Falls, SD	W 33–0		
October 10	at Drake*	Drake Stadium; Des Moines, IA	L 0–18		
October 16	at North Dakota State	Dacotah Field; Fargo, ND	L 6–12		
October 24	Morningside	Inman Field; Vermillion, SD (Dakota Day)	W 35–7	9,000	
October 31	at South Dakota State	State Field; Brookings, SD (Little Brown Jug)	L 0–25	4,000–5,000	
November 7	Iowa State Teachers	Inman Field; Vermillion, SD	L 27–34	3,000	
November 14	North Dakota	Inman Field; Vermillion, SD (Sitting Bull Trophy)	L 14–18		
*Non-conference game
