= 1951 South Dakota State Jackrabbits football team =

American college football season

1951 South Dakota State Jackrabbits football
- Conference: North Central Conference
- Record: 8–1–1 (4–1–1 NCC)
- Head coach: Ralph Ginn (5th season)

1951 North Central Conference football standings
	Conf.					Overall
Team	W		L		T	W		L		T
South Dakota $	6	–	0	–	0	7	–	1	–	0
South Dakota State	4	–	1	–	1	8	–	1	–	1
Iowa State Teachers	3	–	3	–	0	3	–	4	–	0
North Dakota	2	–	3	–	0	2	–	4	–	0
Morningside	2	–	4	–	0	3	–	5	–	1
North Dakota State	1	–	4	–	1	1	–	5	–	1
Augustana (SD)	1	–	4	–	0	3	–	5	–	0
$ – Conference champion

The 1951 South Dakota State Jackrabbits football team was an American football team that represented South Dakota State University in the North Central Conference (NCC) during the 1951 college football season. In its fifth season under head coach Ralph Ginn, the team compiled a 8–1–1 record and outscored opponents by a total of 311 to 105.

== Schedule ==
Date	Opponent	Site	Result	Attendance	Source
September 8	at St. Cloud State*	Saint Cloud, MN	W 26–0		
September 15	Iowa State Teachers	Brookings, SD	W 48–6		
September 22	at Morningside	Sioux City, IA	W 28–26		
September 29	at Augustana (SD)	Sioux Falls, SD	W 58–7		
October 6	Kansas State Teachers	Brookings, SD	W 34–14		
October 13	at North Dakota	Grand Forks, ND	W 21–12		
October 20	North Dakota State	Brookings, SD (rivalry)	T 7–7		
October 27	South Dakota	Brookings, SD (rivalry)	L 6–26	10,000	
November 3	Bemidji State	Brookings, SD	W 48–0		
November 10	at La Crosse State	La Crosse, WI	W 35–7		
*Non-conference game
