= 1951 South Dakota Coyotes football team =

American college football season

1951 South Dakota Coyotes football

NCC champion
- Conference: North Central Conference
- Record: 7–1 (6–0 NCC)
- Head coach: Harry Gamage (14th season)
- Home stadium: Inman Field

1951 North Central Conference football standings
	Conf.					Overall
Team	W		L		T	W		L		T
South Dakota $	6	–	0	–	0	7	–	1	–	0
South Dakota State	4	–	1	–	1	8	–	1	–	1
Iowa State Teachers	3	–	3	–	0	3	–	4	–	0
North Dakota	2	–	3	–	0	2	–	4	–	0
Morningside	2	–	4	–	0	3	–	5	–	1
North Dakota State	1	–	4	–	1	1	–	5	–	1
Augustana (SD)	1	–	4	–	0	3	–	5	–	0
$ – Conference champion

The 1951 South Dakota Coyotes football team was an American football team that represented the University of South Dakota as a member of the North Central Conference (NCC) during the 1951 college football season. In their 14th season under head coach Harry Gamage, the Coyotes compiled a 7–1 record (6–0 against NCC opponents), outscored opponents by a total of 218 to 107, and won the NCC championship.

Training camp began on September 3 with a squad of 50 men, including 19 returning lettermen and 20 freshmen. For the 1951, coach Gamage converted his offensive scheme from the single wing offense used in prior years to a T-formation.

The team played its home games at Inman Field in Vermillion, South Dakota.

== Schedule ==
Date	Opponent	Site	Result	Attendance	Source
September 22	at Marquette*	Marquette Stadium; Milwaukee, WI	L 6–48	8,000	
September 29	at Omaha*	Omaha, NE	W 27–19	3,200	
October 6	at Augustana (SD)	Sioux Falls, SD (Viking Day)	W 54–7		
October 12	at North Dakota State	Dacotah Field; Fargo, ND	W 18–0		
October 20	Morningside	Inman Field; Vermillion, SD (Dakota Day)	W 27–7	5,000	
October 27	at South Dakota State	Brookings, SD (Hobo Day)	W 26–6	10,000	
November 3	Iowa State Teachers	Inman Field; Vermillion, SD	W 25–7	500	
November 10	North Dakota	Inman Field; Vermillion, SD	W 35–13		
*Non-conference game
