= Frank Zazula =

American sports coach (1916–1999)

Biographical details
- Born: July 4, 1916; Passaic, New Jersey, U.S.
- Died: December 12, 1999 (aged 83); St. Louis Park, Minnesota, U.S.

Playing career

Football
- 1937–1939: Akron
- Positions: Halfback, quarterback

Coaching career (HC unless noted)

Football
- 1940–1941: Akron (backfield)
- 1947–1948: Oregon (backfield)
- 1949: North Dakota (backfield)
- 1950–1956: North Dakota

Head coaching record
- Overall: 28–27–3 (football)

Frank Allen "Zaz" Zazula (July 4, 1916 – December 12, 1999) was an American football, track and field, and cross country coach. He served as the head football coach at the University of North Dakota from 1950 to 1956, compiling a record of 28–27–3. Zazula also coached track and field and cross country at North Dakota until 1982.

Zazula grew up in Canton Ohio, and played high school football as a quarterback at Canton McKinley High School. He then starred in football at the University of Akron, lettering from 1937 to 1939. Zazula died on December 12, 1999.

== Head coaching record ==
=== Football ===
Year	Team	Overall	Conference	Standing	Bowl/playoffs
North Dakota Fighting Sioux (North Central Conference) (1950–1956)
1950	North Dakota	5–2–2	3–1–2	3rd	
1951	North Dakota	2–4	2–3	4th	
1952	North Dakota	3–6	2–4	6th	
1953	North Dakota	6–1–1	4–1–1	3rd	
1954	North Dakota	4–5	3–3	T–3rd	
1955	North Dakota	6–3	3–3	T–4th	
1956	North Dakota	2–6	2–4	6th	
North Dakota:		28–27–3	19–19–3		
Total:		28–27–3			
