= 1949 Quincy Hawks football team =

American college football season

1949 Quincy Hawks football

Pioneer champion
- Conference: Pioneer Conference
- Record: 8–1 (3–0 Pioneer)
- Head coach: Mac Wenskunas (3rd season)
- Home stadium: Q Stadium

1949 Pioneer Conference (Illinois) football standings
	Conf.					Overall
Team	W		L		T	W		L		T
Quincy (IL) $	3	–	0	–	0	8	–	1	–	0
McKendree	1	–	2	–	0	3	–	5	–	0
Eureka	1	–	2	–	0	1	–	7	–	0
Shurtleff	1	–	2	–	0	1	–	7	–	0
$ – Conference champion

The 1949 Quincy Hawks football team represented Quincy College—now known as Quincy University—as a member of the Pioneer Conference during the 1949 college football season. Led by Mac Wenskunas in his third and final season as head coach, the Hawks compiled an overall record of 8–1 with a mark of 3–0 in conference play, winning the Pioneer Conference title. Quincy played home games at Q Stadium in Quincy, Illinois.

== Schedule ==
Date	Time	Opponent	Site	Result	Attendance	Source
September 18	2:00 p.m.	St. Ambrose*	Q Stadium; Quincy, IL	L 0–55	4,500	
September 24		at Eastern Illinois*	Lincoln Field; Charleston, IL	W 19–13		
October 1		at McKendree	Lebanon, IL	W 55–0		
October 7		Culver–Stockton*	Quincy, IL	W 40–0		
October 15	2:30 p.m.	Shurtleff	Quincy, IL	W 62–0		
October 23		at Loras*	Dubuque, IA	W 14–13	4,200	
October 29		Parsons*^{†}	Quincy, IL	W 31–0	3,500	
November 5		at Eureka	Eureka, IL	W 60–13		
November 19	8:00 p.m.	at Morningside*	Public Schools stadium; Sioux City, IA	W 28–14	7,000	
*Non-conference game; ^{†}Homecoming; All times are in Central time
