= Mac Wenskunas =

American football player and coach (1922–1957)

Biographical details
- Born: June 8, 1922
- Died: August 3, 1957 (aged 35) near Boody, Illinois, U.S.

Playing career
- 1942: Illinois
- 1945–1946: Illinois
- Position: Center

Coaching career (HC unless noted)
- 1947–1949: Quincy (IL)
- 1950–1953: North Dakota State

Head coaching record
- Overall: 30–27–1

Accomplishments and honors

Championships
- 2 Pioneer Conference (1947–1949)

Mac Paul Wenskunas (June 8, 1922 – August 3, 1957) was an American college football player and coach. He served as the head football coach at Quincy College from 1947 to 1949 and at North Dakota Agricultural College—now known as North Dakota State University—from 1950 to 1953, compiling a career head coaching record of 30–27–1.

A native of Georgetown, Illinois, Wenskunas played football as a center at the University of Illinois at Urbana–Champaign. He lettered for the Illinois Fighting Illini in 1942, 1945, and 1946. He was captain of the 1946 Illinois Fighting Illini football team, which won the Big Ten Conference and the 1947 Rose Bowl. He was a member of the 1947 All-Star team. His college playing years were interrupted by his service in the Marines during World War II.

He was drafted by the Chicago Cardinals in the second round of the 1946 NFL draft with the 11th overall pick, but he was just a junior at the time and did not go to the NFL that year. The following year, he was drafted by the Chicago Rockets with the 136th pick in the 18th round of the 1947 AAFC Draft. Instead of playing football, he went into coaching. He spent three years as the head football coach at Quincy College, where his teams went 19–6 over three seasons and won the Pioneer Conference every year. He then became head coach of North Dakota Agricultural College.

After leaving coaching he moved to Athens, Ohio and then Decatur, Illinois working as a salesman for the Jostin Classroom Jewelry Company.

Wenskunas died with his wife in a two-car crash on August 3, 1957, near Boody, Illinois, that also killed three other people.

== Head coaching record ==
Year	Team	Overall	Conference	Standing	Bowl/playoffs
Quincy Hawks (Pioneer Conference) (1947–1949)
1947	Quincy	4–3	3–0	1st	
1948	Quincy	7–2	3–0	1st	
1949	Quincy	8–1	3–0	1st	
Quincy:		19–21–6	9–0		
North Dakota State Bison (North Central Conference) (1950–1953)
1950	North Dakota State	2–7	0–6	7th	
1951	North Dakota State	1–5–1	1–4–1	6th	
1952	North Dakota State	5–4	4–2	2nd	
1953	North Dakota State	3–5	2–4	T–4th	
North Dakota State:		11–21–1	7–16–1		
Total:		11–21–1			
