= Ralph Ginn =

American athlete and coach (1907–1972)

Biographical details
- Born: July 23, 1907; Lenox, Iowa, U.S.
- Died: May 26, 1972 (aged 64); Pierre, South Dakota, U.S.

Playing career

Football
- 1927–1930: Tarkio

Coaching career (HC unless noted)

Football
- 1931–1940: Tarkio HS (MO)
- 1941–1942: Tarkio
- 1944–1947: Brookings HS (SD)
- 1947–1968: South Dakota State

Basketball
- 1941–1942: Tarkio
- 1942–1944: Wayne State (NE)

Head coaching record
- Overall: 115–101–1 (college football); 18–9 (college basketball, excluding Tarkio)

Accomplishments and honors

Championships
- Football; 9 NCC (1949–1950, 1953–1955, 1957, 1961–1963)

Ralph Ginn (July 23, 1907 – May 26, 1972) was an American football and basketball player and coach. He served as the head football coach at Tarkio College in Tarkio, Missouri from 1941 to 1942 and South Dakota State University from 1947 to 1968, compiling a career college football coaching record of 115–101–10. Ginn was also the head basketball coach at Wayne State College in Wayne, Nebraska from 1942 to 1944 tallying a mark of 18–9. Ginn died on May 26, 1972, at St. Mary's Hospital in Pierre, South Dakota.

== Head coaching record ==
Year	Team	Overall	Conference	Standing	Bowl/playoffs
Tarkio Owls (Missouri College Athletic Union) (1941–1942)
1941	Tarkio	0–6–1	0–4	5th	
1942	Tarkio	2–6	0–3	5th	
Tarkio:		2–12–1	0–7		
South Dakota State Jackrabbits (North Central Conference) (1947–1968)
1947	South Dakota State	4–5	3–1	3rd	
1948	South Dakota State	4–6	2–4	T–4th	
1949	South Dakota State	7–3	5–1	T–1st	
1950	South Dakota State	9–0–1	5–0–1	1st	
1951	South Dakota State	8–1–1	4–1–1	2nd	
1952	South Dakota State	4–4–1	3–2–1	T–3rd	
1953	South Dakota State	5–3–1	5–0–1	1st	
1954	South Dakota State	7–2	5–1	T–1st	
1955	South Dakota State	6–2–1	5–0–1	1st	
1956	South Dakota State	4–5	3–3	T–4th	
1957	South Dakota State	6–2–1	5–0–1	1st	
1958	South Dakota State	4–5	3–3	T–3rd	
1959	South Dakota State	2–7	2–4	6th	
1960	South Dakota State	5–4–1	2–3–1	T–4th	
1961	South Dakota State	8–2	5–1	T–1st	
1962	South Dakota State	7–2–1	5–0–1	T–1st	
1963	South Dakota State	9–1	6–0	1st	
1964	South Dakota State	2–8	2–4	T–4th	
1965	South Dakota State	1–8–1	1–4–1	T–5th	
1966	South Dakota State	3–7	2–4	T–4th	
1967	South Dakota State	4–6	2–4	T–4th	
1968	South Dakota State	4–6	2–4	T–5th	
South Dakota State:		113–89–9	77–44–9		
Total:		115–101–10			
National championship Conference title Conference division title or championship game berth
