= 1924 Creighton Bluejays football team =

American college football season

1924 Creighton Bluejays football
- Conference: North Central Conference
- Record: 6–1–2 (3–1 NCC)
- Head coach: Chet A. Wynne (2nd season)
- Home stadium: Western League Park

1924 North Central Conference football standings
	Conf.					Overall
Team	W		L		T	W		L		T
South Dakota State $	5	–	0	–	0	7	–	1	–	0
South Dakota	4	–	1	–	0	6	–	2	–	0
Creighton	3	–	1	–	0	6	–	1	–	2
North Dakota Agricultural	3	–	3	–	0	5	–	3	–	0
Nebraska Wesleyan	1	–	2	–	0	2	–	4	–	2
Des Moines	1	–	3	–	0	2	–	6	–	0
Morningside	1	–	4	–	0	2	–	5	–	0
North Dakota	1	–	4	–	0	3	–	3	–	0
St. Thomas (MN)	0	–	1	–	0	5	–	2	–	0
$ – Conference champion

The 1924 Creighton Bluejays football team was an American football team that represented Creighton University as a member of the North Central Conference (NCC) during the 1924 college football season. In its second season under head coach Chet A. Wynne, the team compiled a 6–1–2 record (3–1 against NCC opponents) and outscored opponents by a total of 182 to 57. The team played its home games in Omaha, Nebraska.

== Schedule ==
Date	Opponent	Site	Result	Attendance	Source
September 26	at Midland*	Fremont, NE	W 20–7		
October 11	Des Moines	Omaha, NE	W 34–0		
October 18	at Morningside	Sioux City, IA	W 26–6		
October 25	Haskell*	Western League Park; Omaha, NE	T 7–7	9,000	
November 1	at Marquette*	Marquette Stadium; Milwaukee, WI	W 21–7	15,000	
November 8	North Dakota	Western League Park; Omaha, NE	W 34–0		
November 15	Oklahoma A&M*	Omaha, NE	T 20–20		
November 22	Grinnell*	Omaha, NE	W 13–0		
November 27	South Dakota State	Omaha, NE	L 7–10		
*Non-conference game
