= Bob Danielson =

American football player and coach

Biographical details
- Born: c. 1918

Playing career
- 1937: Gustavus Adolphus
- 1946: Minnesota
- Position: Guard

Coaching career (HC unless noted)
- 1947–1949: Huron
- 1950–1956: South Dakota State (line)
- 1957–1962: North Dakota State

Head coaching record
- Overall: 27–48–4

Robert E. Danielson (born c. 1918) is an American former football coach. He served the head football coach at Huron College—later known as Huron University—in Huron, South Dakota from 1947 to 1949, and North Dakota State University from 1957 to 1962, compiling a career college football coaching record of 27–48–4. A native of Minneapolis, Minnesota, Danielson played college football at Gustavus Adolphus College and the University of Minnesota.

== Head coaching record ==
Year	Team	Overall	Conference	Standing	Bowl/playoffs
Huron Scalpers (Dakota-Iowa Athletic Conference) (1947)
1947	Huron	4–3	3–2	2nd	
Huron Scalpers (Dakota-Iowa Athletic Conference / South Dakota Intercollegiate Conference) (1948)
1948	Huron	4–4–1	2–2–1 / 2–2	T–2nd / T–3rd	
Huron Scalpers (South Dakota Intercollegiate Conference) (1949)
1949	Huron	6–2–1	4–1	2nd	
Huron:		14–9–2	9–7–1		
North Dakota State Bison (North Central Conference) (1957–1962)
1957	North Dakota State	0–8	0–5	T–6th	
1958	North Dakota State	3–6	2–4	6th	
1959	North Dakota State	4–4–1	3–2–1	T–2nd	
1960	North Dakota State	3–5–1	2–3–1	T–4th	
1961	North Dakota State	3–6	1–5	6th	
1962	North Dakota State	0–10	0–6	7th	
North Dakota State:		13–39–2	8–25–2		
Total:		27–48–4			
