= 1924 South Dakota State Jackrabbits football team =

American college football season

1924 South Dakota State Jackrabbits football

NCC champion
- Conference: North Central Conference
- Record: 7–1 (5–0 NCC)
- Head coach: Charles A. West (6th season)

1924 North Central Conference football standings
	Conf.					Overall
Team	W		L		T	W		L		T
South Dakota State $	5	–	0	–	0	7	–	1	–	0
South Dakota	4	–	1	–	0	6	–	2	–	0
Creighton	3	–	1	–	0	6	–	1	–	2
North Dakota Agricultural	3	–	3	–	0	5	–	3	–	0
Nebraska Wesleyan	1	–	2	–	0	2	–	4	–	2
Des Moines	1	–	3	–	0	2	–	6	–	0
Morningside	1	–	4	–	0	2	–	5	–	0
North Dakota	1	–	4	–	0	3	–	3	–	0
St. Thomas (MN)	0	–	1	–	0	5	–	2	–	0
$ – Conference champion

The 1924 South Dakota State Jackrabbits football team was an American football team that represented South Dakota State University in the North Central Conference during the 1924 college football season. In its sixth season under head coach Charles A. West, the team compiled a 7–1 record, won the conference championship, and outscored opponents by a total of 105 to 28.

== Schedule ==
Date	Opponent	Site	Result	Source
September 27	Buena Vista*	Brookings, SD	W 16–3	
October 4	North Dakota Agricultural	Brookings, SD (rivalry)	W 14–0	
October 11	at Dakota Wesleyan*	Mitchell, SD	W 14–0	
October 18	at North Dakota	Grand Forks, ND	W 7–6	
November 1	South Dakota	Brookings, SD (rivalry)	W 10–3	
November 8	Morningside	Brookings, SD	W 34–0	
November 15	at Michigan State*	College Field; East Lansing, MI	L 0–9	
November 27	at Creighton	Omaha, NE	W 10–7	
*Non-conference game
