= 1959 North Dakota State Bison football team =

American college football season

1959 North Dakota State Bison football
- Conference: North Central Conference
- Record: 4–4–1 (3–2–1 NCC)
- Head coach: Bob Danielson (3rd season)
- Home stadium: Dacotah Field

1959 North Central Conference football standings
	Conf.					Overall
Team	W		L		T	W		L		T
Augustana (SD) $	4	–	1	–	1	6	–	2	–	1
North Dakota State	3	–	2	–	1	4	–	4	–	1
South Dakota	3	–	2	–	1	4	–	5	–	1
Iowa State Teachers	3	–	3	–	0	6	–	3	–	0
Morningside	3	–	3	–	0	5	–	4	–	0
South Dakota State	2	–	4	–	0	2	–	7	–	0
North Dakota	1	–	4	–	1	2	–	5	–	1
$ – Conference champion

The 1959 North Dakota State Bison football team was an American football team that represented North Dakota State University during the 1959 college football season as a member of the North Central Conference. In their third year under head coach Bob Danielson, the team compiled a 4–4–1 record.

== Schedule ==
Date	Opponent	Site	Result	Attendance	Source
September 12	Concordia–Moorhead*	Dacotah Field; Fargo, ND	W 29–20		
September 19	South Dakota	Dacotah Field; Fargo, ND	T 22–22		
September 26	Iowa State Teachers	Dacotah Field; Fargo, ND	W 32–22		
October 3	at Morningside	Public School Stadium; Sioux City, IA	W 28–20		
October 10	at No. 7 Montana State*	Gatton Field; Bozeman, MT	L 12–24	7,500	
October 17	North Dakota^{†}	Dacotah Field; Fargo, ND (Nickel Trophy)	L 15–20		
October 24	at South Dakota State	State Field; Brookings, SD (rivlary)	W 8–6	4,500	
October 31	at Augustana (SD)	Howard Wood Field; Sioux Falls, SD	L 14–34		
November 7	at Marquette*	Marquette Stadium; Milwaukee, WI	L 0–48	7,200	
*Non-conference game; ^{†}Homecoming; Rankings from UPI Poll released prior to the game
