= Paul J. Davis =

American football and baseball player, sports coach and college athletics administrator

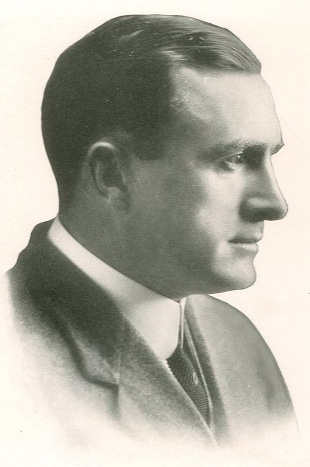
- Davis pictured in The Redskin 1914, Oklahoma A&M yearbook

Biographical details
- Born: February 19, 1881; Williamsburg, Virginia, U.S.
- Died: April 26, 1947 (aged 66); Blossburg, Pennsylvania, U.S.
- Education: Dickinson College

Coaching career (HC unless noted)

Football
- 1908: Dickinson
- 1909–1914: Oklahoma A&M
- 1915–1917: North Dakota Agricultural
- 1918: Camp Zachary Taylor
- 1919–1925: North Dakota
- 1932–1937: Mansfield
- 1941–1942: Mansfield

Basketball
- 1911–1915: Oklahoma A&M
- 1915–1918: North Dakota Agricultural
- 1920–1924: North Dakota
- 1932–1937: Mansfield

Baseball
- 1909–1915: Oklahoma A&M

Administrative career (AD unless noted)
- 1909–1915: Oklahoma A&M
- 1915–1918: North Dakota Agricultural
- 1919–1928: North Dakota

Head coaching record
- Overall: 96–79–13 (football); 114–54 (basketball); 54–40–1 (baseball)

Paul Jones Davis (February 19, 1881 – April 26, 1947) was an American football and baseball player, coach of football, basketball, and baseball, and college athletics administrator. He served as the head football coach at Dickinson College (1908), Oklahoma Agricultural and Mechanical College—now known as Oklahoma State University (1909–1914), North Dakota Agricultural College—now known as North Dakota State University (1915–1917), and University of North Dakota (1920–1924), and Mansfield State Teachers College—now known as Mansfield University of Pennsylvania (1932–1937, 1941–1942). Davis was also the head basketball coach at Oklahoma A&M (1911–1915), North Dakota Agricultural (1915–1918), and North Dakota (1920–1924), amassing a career college basketball coaching mark of 112–44. In addition, he was the head baseball coach at Oklahoma A&M from 1909 to 1915, tallying a record of 54–40–1.

== Playing ==
Davis was a standout baseball and football player at Dickinson College. He played first base for the Altoona Rams, York White Roses, Trenton Tigers, Lancaster Red Roses, Elmira Colonels, and Louisville Colonels.

== Coaching career ==
Davis was the eighth head football coach at Dickinson College in Carlisle, Pennsylvania, serving for one season, in 1908, and compiling a record of 5–4. From 1909 to 1915, he was the director of athletics at Oklahoma A&M. He spent the 1911-13 seasons coaching football, compiling a 30-17-1 record. From 1914-15, he coached basketball and compiled a 15-16 record. At his time at A&M, he also coached baseball.

From 1915 to 1917, Davis coached at North Dakota Agricultural, where he compiled a 10–7–1 record. In 1918, he was the director of athletics at Camp Zachary Taylor. He then coached at North Dakota.

In 1932, Davis joined the faculty of the Mansfield State Teachers College as a social studies instructor and football, basketball, and baseball coach. He stopped coaching in 1937, but remained with the school as an instructor. He returned to the football team in 1941 following the resignation of Glenn Johnson.

== Head coaching record ==
=== Football ===
Year	Team	Overall	Conference	Standing
Dickinson Red and White (Independent) (1908)
1908	Dickinson	5–4		
Dickinson:		5–4		
Oklahoma A&M Aggies (Independent) (1909–1914)
1909	Oklahoma A&M	5–3		
1910	Oklahoma A&M	3–4		
1911	Oklahoma A&M	5–2		
1912	Oklahoma A&M	5–2		
1913	Oklahoma A&M	4–3		
1914	Oklahoma A&M	6–2–1		
Oklahoma A&M:		28–16–1		
North Dakota Agricultural Aggies (Independent) (1915–1917)
1915	North Dakota Agricultural	3–3		
1916	North Dakota Agricultural	3–2–1		
1917	North Dakota Agricultural	4–2		
North Dakota Agricultural:		10–7–1		
Camp Zachary Taylor (Independent) (1918–singe)
1918	Camp Zachary Taylor	3–1–1		
Camp Zachary Taylor:		3–1–1		
North Dakota Flickertails (Independent) (1919–1921)
1919	North Dakota	2–4–1		
1920	North Dakota	4–3–1		
1921	North Dakota	4–4		
North Dakota Flickertails (North Central Conference) (1922–1925)
1922	North Dakota	3–3	3–1	T–2nd
1923	North Dakota	5–3	2–1	2nd
1924	North Dakota	2–8	1–4	T–7th
1925	North Dakota	4–4	2–2	T–4th
North Dakota:		24–29–2	8–8	
Mansfield Mountaineers (Independent) (1932–1937)
1932	Mansfield	4–1–1		
1933	Mansfield	3–3–1		
1934	Mansfield	3–4–1		
1935	Mansfield	4–3–1		
1936	Mansfield	4–3		
1937	Mansfield	4–2		
1941	Mansfield	2–4–1		
1942	Mansfield	2–2–1		
Mansfield:		26–22–5		
Total:		96–79–12		

=== Baseball ===
Record table
Season	Team	Overall	Conference	Standing	Postseason
Oklahoma A&M Cowboys () (1909–1915)
1909	Oklahoma A&M	5–5			
1910	Oklahoma A&M	7–5			
1911	Oklahoma A&M	8–2			
1912	Oklahoma A&M	10–5–1			
1913	Oklahoma A&M	9–4			
1914	Oklahoma A&M	10–7			
1915	Oklahoma A&M	5–12			
Oklahoma A&M:		54–40–1 (.574)			
Total:		54–40–1 (.574)			
National champion Postseason invitational champion Conference regular season champion Conference regular season and conference tournament champion Division regular season champion Division regular season and conference tournament champion Conference tournament champion
