= 1961 North Dakota State Bison football team =

American college football season

1961 North Dakota State Bison football
- Conference: North Central Conference
- Record: 3–6 (1–5 NCC)
- Head coach: Bob Danielson (5th season)
- Home stadium: Dacotah Field

1961 North Central Conference football standings
	Conf.					Overall
Team	W		L		T	W		L		T
South Dakota State +	5	–	1	–	0	8	–	2	–	0
State College of Iowa +	5	–	1	–	0	7	–	2	–	0
North Dakota	4	–	2	–	0	6	–	3	–	0
Augustana (SD)	4	–	2	–	0	5	–	3	–	1
Morningside	2	–	4	–	0	3	–	6	–	0
North Dakota State	1	–	5	–	0	3	–	6	–	0
South Dakota	0	–	6	–	0	1	–	8	–	0
+ – Conference co-champions

The 1961 North Dakota State Bison football team was an American football team that represented North Dakota State University during the 1961 college football season as a member of the North Central Conference (NCC). In their fifth year under head coach Bob Danielson, the team compiled a 3–6 record (1–5 in conference games), finished in sixth place out of seven teams in the NCC, and were outscored by a total of 196 to 124.

The statistical leaders included John Stalpes (730 rushing yards, 44 points scored), Ron Erdmann (259 passing yards), and Tom Reynolds (113 receiving yards).

The team played its home games at Dacotah Field in Fargo, North Dakota.

== Schedule ==
Date	Opponent	Site	Result	Attendance	Source
September 16	Concordia–Moorhead*	Dacotah Field; Fargo, ND	W 21–0		
September 23	South Dakota	Dacotah Field; Fargo, ND	W 41–12		
September 30	State College of Iowa	Dacotah Field; Fargo, ND	L 8–33		
October 7	at Morningside	Public School Stadium; Sioux City, IA	L 6–7		
October 14	Montana State*	Dacotah Field; Fargo, ND	L 0–35	5,000	
October 21	North Dakota^{†}	Dacotah Field; Fargo, ND (Nickel Trophy)	L 6–26		
October 28	at South Dakota State	State Field; Brookings, SD (rivalry)	L 12–41	2,500	
November 4	at Augustana (SD)	Howard Wood Field; Sioux Falls, SD	L 12–35		
November 11	at Mankato State*	Mankato, MN	W 18–7		
*Non-conference game; ^{†}Homecoming

== Personnel ==
=== Players ===
- Perry Amble (#41), sophomore
- Joe Anderson (#85), sophomore
- Charles Bartles (#83), junior
- Kenwood Carr (#33), junior
- Rodney Coyle (#75), senior
- John Eian (#43), senior
- Ron Erdmann (#21), junior
- Roger Erickson (#80), senior
- Dave Gentzkow (#32), senior
- William Goldammer (#60), sophomore
- John Hanesiak (#30), sophomore
- Steve Heidecker (#20), sophomore
- Wes Hendrickson (#63), senior
- Harold Hughes (#11), junior
- William Kingsbury (#71), senior
- Harmon Krause (#10), senior
- Keith Merkt (#70), senior
- Harold Mitchell (#72), sophomore
- Wally Musegades (#87), junior
- Arthur Nelson (#12), sophomore
- Don Paulson (#70), sophomore
- Tom Pendergast (#74), sophomore
- Tom Reynolds (#84), senior
- Dave Schindler (#62), junior
- Dick Schindler (#61), sophomore
- Jerry Schmidt (#50), sophomore
- John Stalpes (#40), senior
- George Thole (#65), senior
- Roger Villreal (#40), junior
- Jim Walsh (#51), junior
- Bob Yaggie (#64), senior
- Bruce Zelinski (#14), junior

=== Coaches ===
- Head coach: Bob Danielson
- Assistant coaches: Don Johnson, Ross Fortier
