= 1951 North Dakota State Bison football team =

American college football season

1951 North Dakota State Bison football
- Conference: North Central Conference
- Record: 1–5–1 (1–4–1 NCC)
- Head coach: Mac Wenskunas (2nd season)
- Home stadium: Dacotah Field

1951 North Central Conference football standings
	Conf.					Overall
Team	W		L		T	W		L		T
South Dakota $	6	–	0	–	0	7	–	1	–	0
South Dakota State	4	–	1	–	1	8	–	1	–	1
Iowa State Teachers	3	–	3	–	0	3	–	4	–	0
North Dakota	2	–	3	–	0	2	–	4	–	0
Morningside	2	–	4	–	0	3	–	5	–	1
North Dakota State	1	–	4	–	1	1	–	5	–	1
Augustana (SD)	1	–	4	–	0	3	–	5	–	0
$ – Conference champion

The 1951 North Dakota State Bison football team was an American football team that represented North Dakota State University during the 1951 college football season as a member of the North Central Conference. In their second year under head coach Mac Wenskunas, the team compiled a 1–5–1 record.

== Schedule ==
Date	Opponent	Site	Result	Source
September 15	Concordia–Moorhead*	Dacotah Field; Fargo, ND	L 7–21	
September 22	at Augustana (SD)	Viking Stadium; Sioux Falls, SD	L 0–12	
September 28	Iowa State Teachers	Dacotah Field; Fargo, ND	W 27–14	
October 5	at Morningside	Public School Stadium; Sioux City, IA	L 6–18	
October 12	South Dakota	Dacotah Field; Fargo, ND	L 0–18	
October 20	at South Dakota State	State Field; Brookings, SD (rivalry)	T 7–7	
October 27	North Dakota^{†}	Dacotah Field; Fargo, ND (Nickel Trophy)	L 14–33	
*Non-conference game; ^{†}Homecoming
