= 1953 North Dakota State Bison football team =

American college football season

1953 North Dakota State Bison football
- Conference: North Central Conference
- Record: 3–5 (2–4 NCC)
- Head coach: Mac Wenskunas (4th season)
- Home stadium: Dacotah Field

1953 North Central Conference football standings
	Conf.					Overall
Team	W		L		T	W		L		T
South Dakota State $	5	–	0	–	1	5	–	3	–	1
Iowa State Teachers	5	–	1	–	0	6	–	3	–	0
North Dakota	4	–	1	–	1	6	–	1	–	1
Morningside	2	–	4	–	0	3	–	5	–	0
North Dakota State	2	–	4	–	0	3	–	5	–	0
South Dakota	2	–	4	–	0	2	–	6	–	0
Augustana (SD)	0	–	6	–	0	1	–	8	–	0
$ – Conference champion

The 1953 North Dakota State Bison football team was an American football team that represented North Dakota State University during the 1953 college football season as a member of the North Central Conference. In their fourth year under head coach Mac Wenskunas, the team compiled a 3–5 record.

== Schedule ==
Date	Opponent	Site	Result	Attendance	Source
September 12	Concordia–Moorhead*	Dacotah Field; Fargo, ND	W 7–6		
September 18	at Detroit*	University of Detroit Stadium; Detroit, MI	L 6–33	18,200	
October 3	at Morningside	Public School Stadium; Sioux City, IA	L 14–20		
October 9	Iowa State Teachers	Dacotah Field; Fargo, ND	L 21–27		
October 16	South Dakota	Dacotah Field; Fargo, ND	W 12–6		
October 24	at South Dakota State	State Field; Brookings, SD (rivalry)	L 14–32	7,500	
October 31	North Dakota^{†}	Dacotah Field; Fargo, ND (Nickel Trophy)	L 6–26		
November 7	at Augustana (SD)	Viking Stadium; Sioux Falls, SD	W 34–18		
*Non-conference game; ^{†}Homecoming
