= Pioneer Conference (Illinois) =

The Pioneer Conference was a short-lived intercollegiate athletic conference that existed from 1946 to 1950. The league had members in the state of Illinois.

== Football champions ==
- 1947 – Quincy (IL)
- 1948 – Quincy (IL)
- 1949 – Quincy (IL)

== Football standings ==
1947 Pioneer Conference (Illinois) football standings
	Conf.					Overall
Team	W		L		T	W		L		T
Quincy (IL) $	3	–	0	–	0	4	–	3	–	0
Shurtleff	2	–	1	–	0	6	–	3	–	0
Eureka	1	–	2	–	0	2	–	5	–	0
McKendree	0	–	3	–	0	0	–	7	–	0
$ – Conference champion

1948 Pioneer Conference (Illinois) football standings
	Conf.					Overall
Team	W		L		T	W		L		T
Quincy (IL) $	3	–	0	–	0	7	–	2	–	0
Shurtleff	2	–	1	–	0	4	–	4	–	0
Eureka	1	–	2	–	0	4	–	3	–	0
McKendree	0	–	3	–	0	1	–	7	–	0
$ – Conference champion

1949 Pioneer Conference (Illinois) football standings
	Conf.					Overall
Team	W		L		T	W		L		T
Quincy (IL) $	3	–	0	–	0	8	–	1	–	0
McKendree	1	–	2	–	0	3	–	5	–	0
Eureka	1	–	2	–	0	1	–	7	–	0
Shurtleff	1	–	2	–	0	1	–	7	–	0
$ – Conference champion

== See also ==
- List of defunct college football conferences
