= 1924 South Dakota Coyotes football team =

American college football season

1924 South Dakota Coyotes football
- Conference: North Central Conference
- Record: 6–2 (4–1 NCC)
- Head coach: Stub Allison (3rd season)

1924 North Central Conference football standings
	Conf.					Overall
Team	W		L		T	W		L		T
South Dakota State $	5	–	0	–	0	7	–	1	–	0
South Dakota	4	–	1	–	0	6	–	2	–	0
Creighton	3	–	1	–	0	6	–	1	–	2
North Dakota Agricultural	3	–	3	–	0	5	–	3	–	0
Nebraska Wesleyan	1	–	2	–	0	2	–	4	–	2
Des Moines	1	–	3	–	0	2	–	6	–	0
Morningside	1	–	4	–	0	2	–	5	–	0
North Dakota	1	–	4	–	0	3	–	3	–	0
St. Thomas (MN)	0	–	1	–	0	5	–	2	–	0
$ – Conference champion

The 1924 South Dakota Coyotes football team was an American football team that represented the University of South Dakota in the North Central Conference (NCC) during the 1924 college football season. In its third season under head coach Stub Allison, the team compiled a 6–2 record (4–1 against NCC opponents), finished in second place out of nine teams in the NCC, and outscored opponents by a total of 108 to 51.

== Schedule ==
Date	Opponent	Site	Result	Attendance	Source
September 27	Yankton*	Vermillion, SD	W 19–0		
October 4	at Northwestern*	Northwestern Field; Evanston, IL	L 0–28		
October 11	North Dakota	Vermillion, SD (rivalry)	W 6–0	5,000	
October 18	Nebraska Wesleyan	Vermillion, SD	W 19–0		
November 1	at South Dakota State	Brookings, SD (rivalry)	L 3–10		
November 8	at Columbus (SD)*		W 7–0		
November 15	North Dakota Agricultural	Vermillion, SD	W 13–6		
November 27	at Morningside	Sioux City, IA	W 41–7		
*Non-conference game
