= Glenn Johnson (coach) =

Playing career

Football
- 1920: Indiana

Basketball
- 1920–1921: Indiana

Coaching career (HC unless noted)

Football
- 1922: Huntington (IN)
- 1924–1926: Bloomington HS (IN)
- 1930–1934: Skaneateles HS (NY)
- 1935–1939: Hartwick
- 1940: Mansfield
- 1942–1945: Central Normal
- 1948–1950: Bethany (WV)
- 1952–1953: Southwestern (TN)

Basketball
- 1921–1924: Huntington (IN)
- 1935–1940: Hartwick
- 1940–1941: Mansfield
- 1941–1942: Arsenal Technical HS (IN)
- 1942–1948: Central Normal / Canterbury (IN)
- 1948–1951: Bethany (WV)
- 1951–1956: Southwestern (TN)

Baseball
- 1936–1940: Hartwick
- 1952–?: Southwestern (TN)

Track
- 1956–1967: Memphis State

Administrative career (AD unless noted)
- 1921–1924: Huntington (IN)
- 1935–1940: Hartwick
- 1951–1956: Southwestern (TN)

Head coaching record
- Overall: 20–74–8 (college football)

Glenn A. Johnson was an American football, basketball, baseball and track coach and college athletics administrator.

Johnson was a collegiate athletic at Indiana University in Bloomington, Indiana, lettering in basketball in 1921.

He served as the head football coach at Hartwick College in Oneonta, New York from 1935 to 1939, Mansfield University of Pennsylvania in 1940, Bethany College in Bethany, West Virginia from 1948 to 1950, and Rhodes College (then known as Southwestern College) in Memphis, Tennessee from 1951 to 1953.

Johnson was also instrumental in establishing the Hoosier College Conference in 1947 while serving as the athletic director at Canterbury College in Danville, Indiana.

== Head coaching record ==
=== College football ===
| Year | Team | Overall | Conference | Standing | Bowl/playoffs |
|---|---|---|---|---|---|
Huntington (Independent) (1922)
| 1922 | Huntington | 0–4–1 | | | |
| Huntington: | | 0–4–1 | | | |
Hartwick Hawks (Independent) (1935–1939)
| 1935 | Hartwick | 2–5–1 | | | |
| 1936 | Hartwick | 0–5–2 | | | |
| 1937 | Hartwick | 3–4–1 | | | |
| 1938 | Hartwick | 3–4 | | | |
| 1939 | Hartwick | 0–6–1 | | | |
| Hartwick: | | 8–24–5 | | | |
Mansfield Mountaineers (Independent) (1940)
| 1940 | Mansfield | 3–4 | | | |
| Mansfield: | | 3–4 | | | |
Central Normal Purple Warriors (Indiana Intercollegiate Conference) (1942–1945)
| 1942 | Central Normal | 0–4 | 0–3 | 13th | |
| 1943 | No team—World War II | | | | |
| 1944 | Central Normal | 3–1–1 | | | |
| 1945 | Central Normal | 2–4 | 2–3 | 7th | |
| Central Normal: | | 5–9–1 | | | |
Bethany Bison (West Virginia Intercollegiate Athletic Conference) (1948–1950)
| 1948 | Bethany | 1–6 | 1–3 | T–10th | |
| 1949 | Bethany | 2–6 | 2–1 | NA | |
| 1950 | Bethany | 1–6–1 | 0–2 | NA | |
| Bethany: | | 4–18–1 | 3–6 | | |
Southwestern Lynx (Independent) (1952–1953)
| 1952 | Southwestern | 0–8 | | | |
| 1953 | Southwestern | 1–7 | | | |
| Southwestern: | | 1–15 | | | |
| Total: | | 20–74–8 | | | |
