= Stanley Borleske =

American athlete and coach (1888–1967)

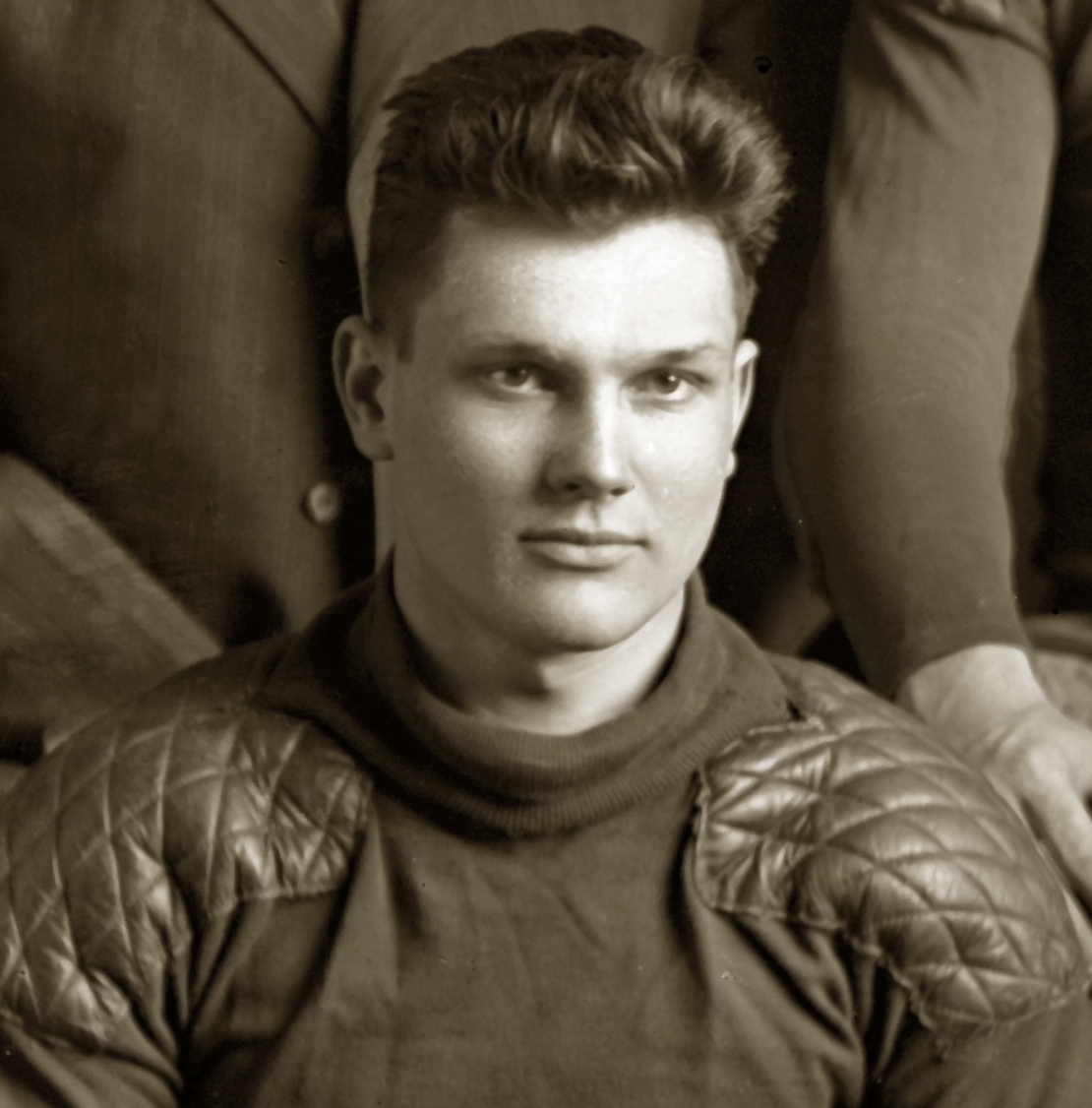
- Borleske cropped from 1910 Michigan football team photograph

Biographical details
- Born: August 20, 1888; Albert Lea, Minnesota, U.S.
- Died: January 3, 1967 (aged 78); Whittier, California, U.S.

Playing career

Football
- 1907: Whitman
- 1908–1910: Michigan

Baseball
- 1908: Whitman
- 1911: Dallas Giants
- Position: End (football)

Coaching career (HC unless noted)

Football
- 1919–1921: North Dakota Agricultural
- 1923–1924: North Dakota Agricultural
- 1928: North Dakota Agricultural
- 1929–1932: Fresno State

Basketball
- 1919–1922: North Dakota Agricultural
- 1934–1939: Fresno State

Baseball
- 1920–1921: North Dakota Agricultural
- 1923–1924: North Dakota Agricultural
- 1930–1941: Fresno State

Administrative career (AD unless noted)
- 1919–1925: North Dakota Agricultural

Head coaching record
- Overall: 36–36–7 (football); 75–75 (basketball); 99–58–1 (baseball)

Accomplishments and honors

Championships
- Football; 1 Far Western Conference (1930)

Stanley Evans Borleske (August 20, 1888 – January 3, 1967) was an American football, basketball, and baseball player and coach. He served as the head football coach at North Dakota Agricultural College—now North Dakota State University (1919–1921, 1923–1924, 1928) and at Fresno State Teachers College—now California State University, Fresno (1929–1932), compiling a career college football head coaching record of 36–36–7. Borleske's 1930 Fresno State Bulldogs football team is one of only three in program history to complete a season undefeated. Borleske coached basketball at North Dakota Agricultural from 1919 to 1922 and at Fresno State from 1934 to 1939, tallying a mark of 75–75. He was also the head baseball coach at the two schools, from 1920 to 1921 and 1923 to 1924 at North Dakota Agricultural and from 1930 to 1941 at Fresno State, amassing a record of 99–58–1.

Borleske selected the North Dakota Agricultural's mascot, the bison. He grew up in Spokane, Washington and attended Whitman College, where he played football and basketball and ran track during the 1907–08 academic year. He played football at the University of Michigan from 1908 to 1910.

In 1964, Borleske was inducted into the Fresno County Athletic Hall of Fame. He died in Whittier, California in 1967 of an apparent heart attack at age 78. Borleske's brother, Vincent Borleske, was also a college athlete and coach.

== Head coaching record ==
=== Football ===
Year	Team	Overall	Conference	Standing	Bowl/playoffs
North Dakota Agricultural Aggies (Independent) (1919–1921)
1919	North Dakota Agricultural	5–1–1			
1920	North Dakota Agricultural	2–3–1			
1921	North Dakota Agricultural	3–3–1			
North Dakota Agricultural Bison (North Central Conference) (1923–1924)
1923	North Dakota Agricultural	2–4–1	1–3	7th	
1924	North Dakota Agricultural	5–3	3–3	4th	
North Dakota Agricultural Bison (North Central Conference) (1928)
1928	North Dakota Agricultural	3–4–1	1–3	T–3rd	
North Dakota Agricultural:		20–18–5	5–9		
Fresno State Bulldogs (Far Western Conference) (1929–1932)
1929	Fresno State	1–7	1–4	6th	
1930	Fresno State	8–0	5–0	1st	
1931	Fresno State	4–6	3–2	5th	
1932	Fresno State	3–5–2	0–3–1	6th	
Fresno State:		16–18–2	9–9–1		
Total:		36–36–7			
National championship Conference title Conference division title or championship game berth

== See also ==
- List of college football head coaches with non-consecutive tenure
