= 1961 Little All-America college football team =

American college football season

The 1961 Little All-America college football team was composed of college football players from small colleges and universities who were selected by the Associated Press (AP) as the best players at each position. For 1961, the AP selected three teams of 11 players each, with no separate defensive platoons.

Halfback Leroy Jackson of Western Illinois finished third in the NCAA in the 100-yard dash and was selected by the Cleveland Browns in the first round (11th overall pick) of the 1962 NFL draft.

Back Joe Iacone of West Chester was the only junior selected for the first team. He repeated as a first-team player in 1962.

== First team ==
Position	Player	Team
B	Leroy Jackson	Western Illinois
B	Bobby Jancik	Lamar Tech
B	Gary Snadon	Pittsburg State
B	Joe Iacone	West Chester
E	Drew Roberts	Humboldt State
E	Powell McClellan	Arkansas Tech
T	Ray Jacobs	Howard Payne
T	David Baxter	Tennessee Tech
G	Dan Lewis	Wofford
G	Wendell Williams	State College of Iowa
C	Curtis Miranda	Florida A&M

== Second team ==
Position	Player	Team
B	Carey Henley	Chattanooga
B	Donald Lee Smith	Langston
B	Sid Blanks	Texas A&I
B	Joe Thorne	South Dakota State
E	Paul Blazevich	Omaha
E	John Murlo	Whitworth
T	Frank Annweiler	Texas Lutheran
T	Dave Kemna	Wheaton (IL)
G	Douglas Brown	Fresno State
G	James Lightner	Coast Guard
C	Terry Fohs	Washington & Lee

== Third team ==
Position	Player	Team
B	Kenneth Fults	Tennessee Tech
B	Dennis Spurlock	Whitworth
B	Steve Beguin	Linfield
B	Roy Curry	Jackson State
E	John Budde	Carroll (WI)
E	Stuart Hall	Willamette
T	John Lamoski	Western Michigan
T	Paul Abodeely	Amherst
G	Al Sandona	Northern Michigan
G	Charles Speleotis	Bowdoin
C	Michael Reilly	Williams

== See also ==
- 1961 College Football All-America Team
