= Glen Johnson (footballer, born 1952) =

English footballer

Personal information
- Date of birth: 7 March 1952 (age 74)
- Place of birth: Barrow-in-Furness, England
- Height: 6 ft 2 in (1.88 m)
- Position: Goalkeeper

Senior career*
Years	Team	Apps	(Gls)
1969–1970	Arsenal	0	(0)
1970–1973	Doncaster Rovers	95	(0)
1972–1973	→ Walsall (loan)	3	(0)
1973–1983	Aldershot	424	(0)
Total		522	(0)
- * Club domestic league appearances and goals

Glen Johnson (born 7 March 1952) is an English former footballer who played in the Football League for Aldershot, Doncaster Rovers and Walsall.
