= Memorial Stadium (University of North Dakota) =

Stadium in Grand Forks, North Dakota

Coordinates: 47°55′12″N 97°3′53″W

- Interactive map of Memorial Stadium
- Location: 2nd Ave. North; Grand Forks, ND 58202
- Owner: University of North Dakota
- Capacity: 10,000
- Surface: SprintTurf

Construction
- Opened: October 8, 1927

Tenants
- North Dakota Fighting Sioux football (NCAA) (1927–2001); North Dakota ice hockey (1927–1928)

Memorial Stadium is the home of the University of North Dakota (UND) track and field teams. It is located on the campus of UND in Grand Forks, North Dakota. The stadium opened in 1927. Memorial Stadium was home of the UND football from 1927 until 2001. Today, the football team plays in the nearby Alerus Center; however, the team continues to utilize Memorial Stadium for team offices, training, and practices.

In March 2021, the grandstands at Memorial Stadium, which seated 10,000 people, were demolished to make room for a new 25 million dollar building. The new building houses athletic offices and apartments. The athletic field is the only part of the old Memorial Stadium that remains today.

Memorial stadium served as the home for the school's ice hockey program during the 1927–28 season.
