= O. R. Latham Stadium =

Stadium in Iowa, USA

Coordinates: 42°30′56″N 92°27′52″W

- Interactive map of O. R. Latham Stadium
- Location: Cedar Falls, Iowa
- Owner: University of Northern Iowa
- Capacity: 8,000 (6,000 permanent plus 2,000 temporary on East side)
- Surface: Grass

Construction
- Opened: October 17, 1936; 89 years ago
- Demolished: Summer 1976; 50 years ago

Tenant
- Northern Iowa Panthers football (1936–1975)

O. R. Latham Stadium was an outdoor stadium, on the campus of the University of Northern Iowa, in Cedar Falls, Iowa. It was named in honor the Northern Iowa's third president, Orval Ray Latham.

Following a post-war enrollment boom, the mezzanine level was converted into Stadium Hall, a men's dormitory that opened for the Fall 1947 semester. This space had housed military personnel during World War II. Plans announced for the conversion in 1946 called for accommodations for 160 students. The last students moved out of Stadium Hall in November 1961.

The West Stadium was demolished in the summer of 1976. In the summer of 1987 the East Stadium was demolished.
