= Mabelvale =

Unincorporated community in Arkansas, U.S.

Coordinates: 34°39′18″N 92°23′12″W

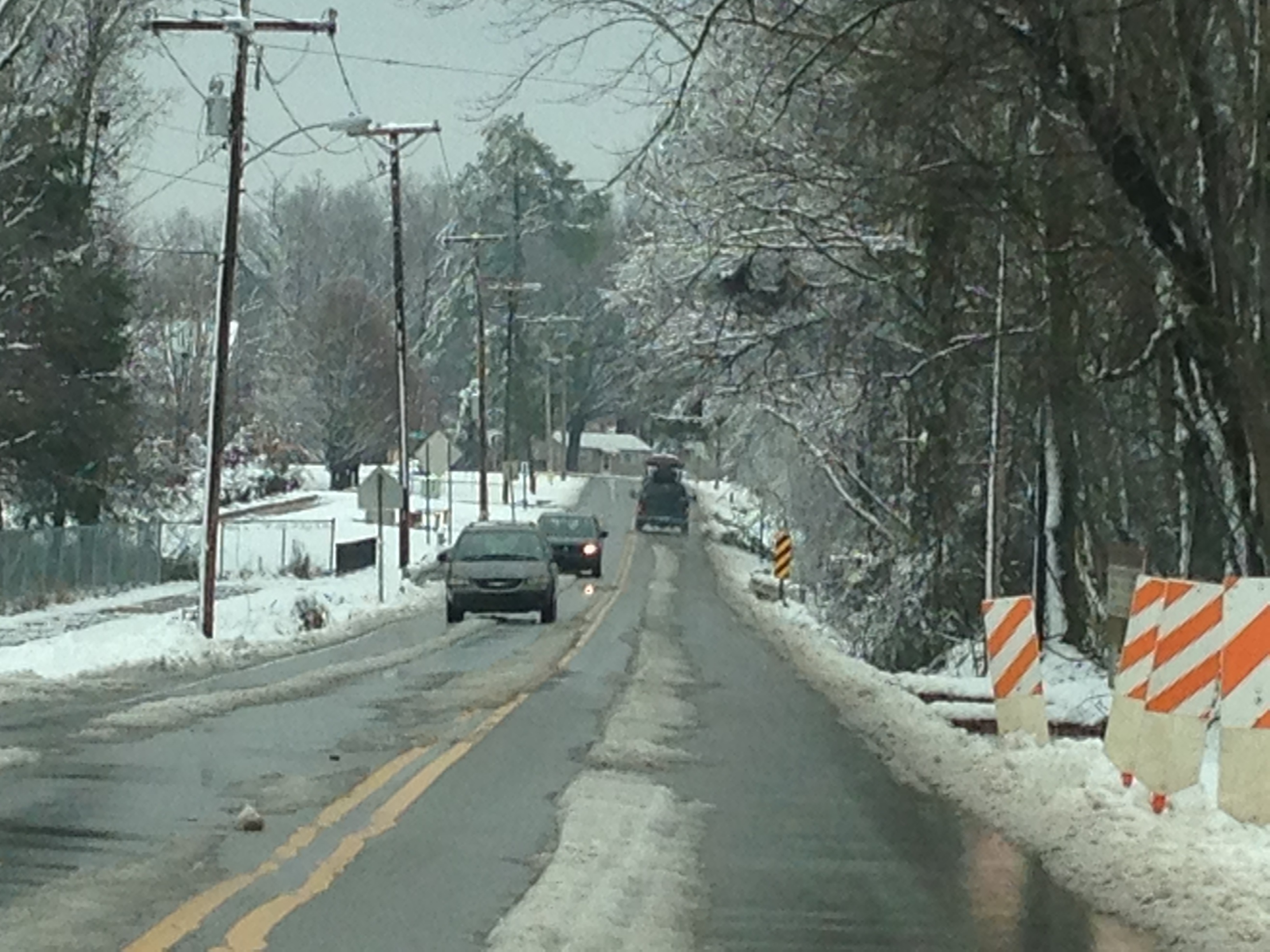
Winter 2013, on Mabelvale West Rd.

Mabelvale is a neighborhood in the southern part of Little Rock, in Pulaski County, Arkansas. It began as a railroad town in the 19th century and was annexed by Little Rock in the 1970s after residents considered incorporation as an independent city in the 1960s.

The area today is part of Little Rock's seventh ward, although it retains a separate postal designation and ZIP code 72103.

The neighborhood is generally defined as the homes and businesses in the immediate area around Mabelvale Main Street and the Union Pacific railroad line. Although the portion of Little Rock known as Mabelvale is in Pulaski County, the name has also historically been used for an adjacent unincorporated area in northern Saline County.

== Neighborhood services ==
Most major community services are linked with the various governmental departments of the City of Little Rock. The city's street department maintains all streets in Little Rock's incorporated parts of Mabelvale, notably Mabelvale Main Street, Mabelvale Cut-Off Road, and Mabelvale West Road — three of the neighborhood's busier paths. Little Rock Fire Station #18, which provides fire protection for the area, is located on Mabelvale West Road. Police service is covered by the Little Rock Police Department's Southwest Substation on Baseline Road. Public transportation is provided by bus service on the Central Arkansas Transit Authority's Route #17.

Four Little Rock School District campuses are located around the neighborhood, providing education from pre-kindergarten through the eighth grade. Mabelvale Elementary School is located on Mabelvale Cut-Off Road across the street from Morehart Park and has served the area since opening in 1980. Across the neighborhood is Mabelvale Magnet Middle School on Mabelvale West Road near the post office. The middle school first opened in 1952, and joined the Little Rock district in 1987 to serve a large portion of southern neighborhoods throughout the city. Also in the area is Chicot Elementary, which serves students in pre-kindergarten through fifth grade.In 2020, Little Rock Southwest Magnet High School opened enrolling over 2,000 students in grades 9-12.

Morehart Park, a forty-three-acre municipal park, is owned and operated by the City of Little Rock's Parks and Recreation Department. Initial preparation for the park was conducted by the Arkansas Archeological Survey in 1978. Today, Morehart Park includes a pavilion, a disc golf course, separate tennis and basketball courts, a softball and baseball field, playground areas for children, and hiking and jogging paths. The Morehart Spring is nestled away in a heavily wooded eastern portion of the park; it is the source of a small northward-flowing brooklet that throughout the year provides vitally needed pure, crystalline water for the park's wildlife and birdlife.

The park takes its name from the family of Amos Morehart and his wife Emma Harrison Morehart. Amos Morehart and his new bride Emma first settled on what is now a portion of the park land in 1890: in that year the land had been given as a wedding present to Amos Morehart by his father, Henry Morehart. Thereafter, Amos Morehart regularly purchased additional surrounding acreage over the years (most of which subsequently would also become part of the park). He operated on his property a berry, fruit, and vegetable farm; an apiary; a sawmill camp; and a tanyard, having purchased the license for the latter business from previous owners, who had already incorporated it under the name of the "Swamp Angel Tannery." A community leader who was active in civic affairs, for many years Amos Morehart served as a president and a member of the Board of Directors of the former Mabelvale Rural School District. Amos Morehart's father, Henry Morehart, had likewise been active in local Mabelvale community life: he was a leader of the agrarian insurgency and farmers' third-party political rebellion of the late 1880s and ran for the state legislature in 1888 as a third-party candidate. Despite a theft of ballot boxes by his opponents, he and his running mates were eventually declared victorious and assumed their seats as Pulaski County state representatives in the Arkansas General Assembly on February 18, 1889.

In addition to their public service as office-holders, both men are remembered for their community involvements and philanthropic contributions to the Mabelvale community. During the era of the Second World War, Amos Morehart deeded a parcel of his land to the local chapter of the American Legion, to be used as the location for a new Legion meeting post. Earlier, his father, Henry Morehart, donated several acres of his farm on Sardis Road (which he had homesteaded beginning in 1881), so that they could be used as the location for Mabelvale's pioneer Good Hope School.

Many descendants of Amos and Henry Morehart still reside in the Mabelvale area.

While Morehart Park is by far the largest park within Mabelvale, a non-contiguous much smaller park lies just to its north. Known as Little Oaks Park, this smaller recreational area was begun as a ballpark for Little League games. Located near the intersection of Leah Lane and Sardis Road in downtown Mabelvale, its name may have derived from the old adage, "From a small acorn a mighty oak will grow."

== Shopping ==
Located on the southwestern corner of Mabelvale and Otter Creek is The Outlets of Little Rock. Opening on 15 October 2015, it is Arkansas’s only outlet shopping center.

== Community organizations ==
The Vedanta Society of Arkansas has a temple in Mabelvale. Other community groups include Adoniram Lodge Number 288 of Free and Accepted Masons and its affiliated Masonic organizations, Adoniram Chapter Number 604 of the Order of Eastern Star for women and Adoniram Assembly Number 99 of the International Order of the Rainbow for girls. All three of these latter groups meet regularly at the Masonic Temple, which is located at 9725 Mabelvale Main Street, on the southeast corner of Mabelvale Main and Sardis Road.
