= Dunbar Magnet Middle School =

Dunbar Gifted/Talented Education International Studies Magnet Middle School

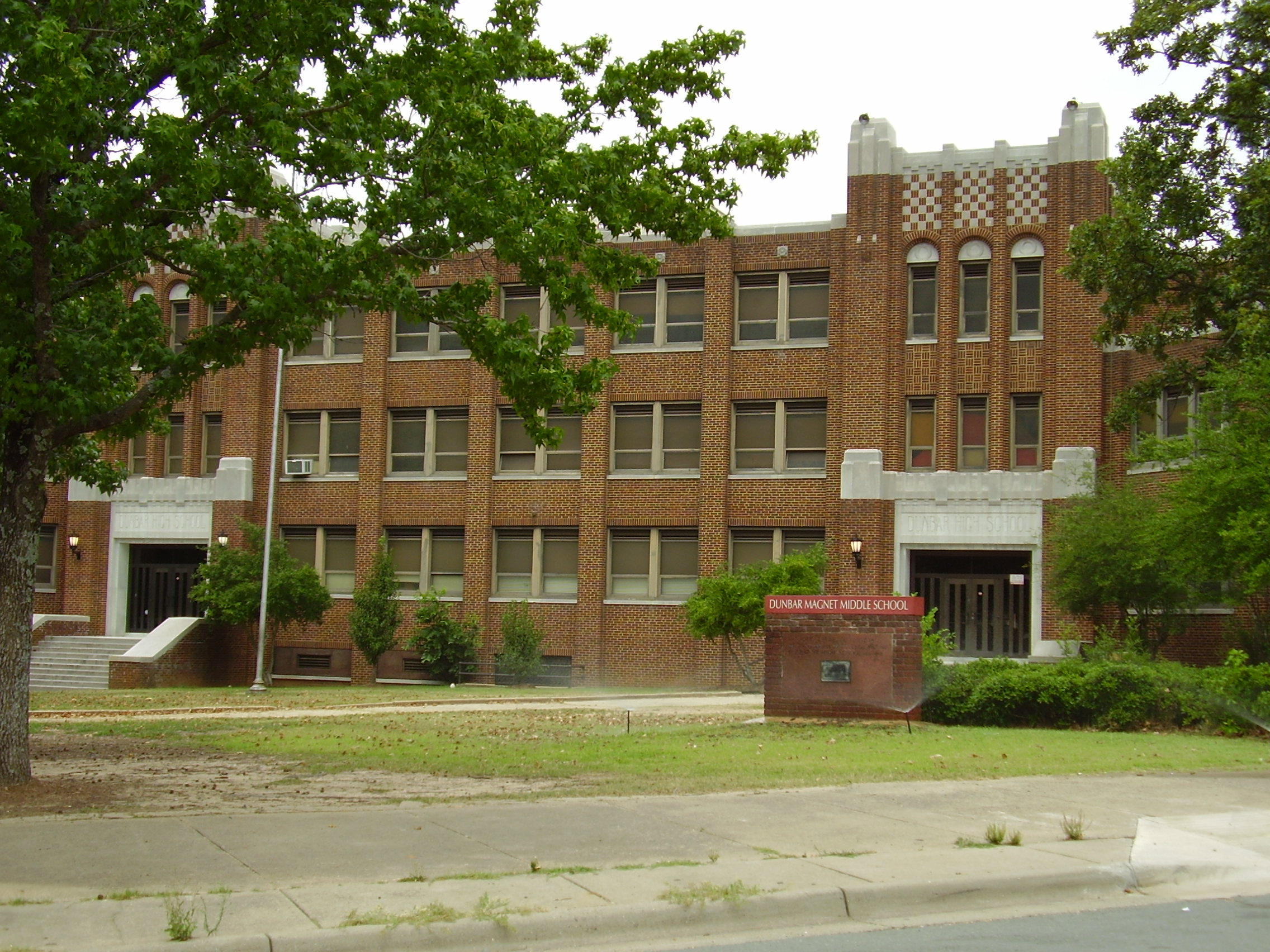
- Dunbar Magnet Middle School

Location
- 1100 Wright Ave. Little Rock, Arkansas; United States; 34.7324°N 92.2863°W

Information
- Type: Public
- Established: 1929
- School district: Little Rock School District
- Principal: Eunice Thrasher
- Teaching staff: 41.94 (FTE)
- Grades: 6-8
- Enrollment: 561 (2018-19)
- Student to teacher ratio: 13.38
- Color
- Mascot: Bobcats
- Website: www.lrsd.org/o/dunbar
- Dunbar Junior and Senior High School and Junior College
- U.S. National Register of Historic Places
- U.S. Historic district – Contributing property
- Location within Arkansas Location within the United States
- Area: less than one acre
- Built: August 17, 1929
- Architect: Wittenberg & Delony
- Architectural style: Art Deco
- Part of: Paul Laurence Dunbar School Neighborhood Historic District (ID13000789)
- NRHP reference No.: 80000782

Significant dates
- Added to NRHP: 1980
- Designated CP: September 27, 2013

Dunbar Gifted & Talented Education International Studies Magnet Middle School is a magnet middle school for students in grades 6 through 8 located in Little Rock, Arkansas, United States. Dunbar Magnet Middle School is administered by the Little Rock School District. It is named for the nationally known African-American poet, Paul Laurence Dunbar.

With construction supported by the Rosenwald Fund and a matching program, the school was built in 1929. For nearly three decades it provided comprehensive education for black students in Little Rock, under a segregated system. Its curriculum covered junior and senior high school classes, as well as some junior college. After 1955 the junior college was discontinued and, with construction of a new high school, this building was devoted to junior high school. Later it was adapted as a magnet middle school in the public school system.

== History ==
=== Dunbar Junior and Senior High School and Junior College ===
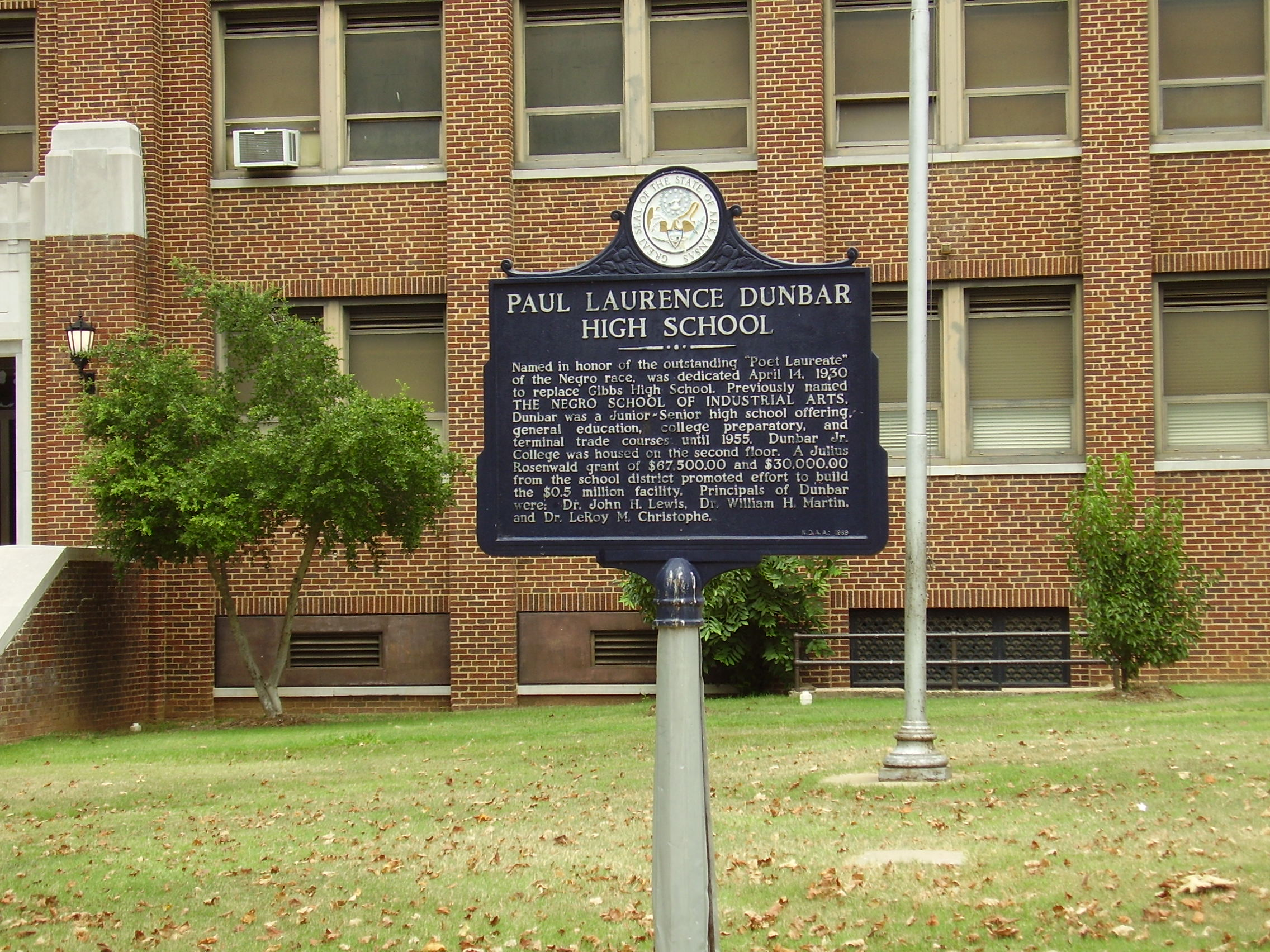
Sign indicating the school's past

Dunbar Junior and Senior High School and Junior College, is located at the corner of Wright Avenue and Ringo Street in Little Rock, Arkansas. Named for Paul Laurence Dunbar, who was the first African American to gain national eminence as a poet. The institution has become significant in four distinct areas: African-American history, education history, legal history, and architecture/engineering achievement. Between 1929 and 1955, Dunbar provided comprehensive education for black students in Little Rock, under a state-segregated system. The building was added to the National Register of Historic Places in 1980. Dunbar is located near the historically famous Little Rock Central High School and is a principal feeder into that school. Little Rock Central is also on the National Register of Historic Places.

Since its construction in 1929, partially supported as a Rosenwald School, Dunbar was the site of the Negro School of Industrial Arts, the Paul Laurence Dunbar Junior and Senior High School (the city's "black school", as opposed to Little Rock Central, which was for white students in the segregated system), and Dunbar Junior College. Architecturally, Dunbar is a scaled miniature of Central High. Between 1929 and 1955, the school served as a junior and senior high school, with some classes developed for a junior college. In May 1955, the junior college program was abruptly terminated by the public school system, following the US Supreme Court decision in Brown v. Board of Education ruling that segregated education was unconstitutional. In the fall 1955, this school became used fully as a junior high school. High school students attended the recently opened Horace Mann High School.

== Curriculum ==
In the early 21st century, most students take a foreign language class, and 6th graders are required to take nine weeks of Spanish, German, or French, plus Latin. Many go on to first and second-year courses in these languages. Central High maintains a foreign language program that culminates with Spanish VI, German VI, French VI, and Latin IV classes. Dunbar is the local anchor for an extensive Gifted and Talented program.

== Feeder schools ==
=== Elementary schools ===
Dunbar Magnet Middle School receives students from:

- King Elementary
- Stephens Elementary
- Washington Elementary
- Other students from the Little Rock School District can also attend if they don't live in the attendance zone.

=== High schools ===
Dunbar Magnet Middle School prepares students for:

- Central International Studies High School
- McClellan Magnet High School (some areas are zoned to McClellan)
