= 2019 North Dakota State Bison football team =

American college football season

2019 North Dakota State Bison football

NCAA Division I champion MVFC champion

NCAA Division I Championship Game, W 28–20 vs. James Madison
- Conference: Missouri Valley Football Conference

Ranking
- STATS: No. 1
- FCS Coaches: No. 1
- Record: 16–0 (8–0 MVFC)
- Head coach: Matt Entz (1st season)
- Offensive coordinator: Tyler Roehl (1st season)
- Offensive scheme: Pro-style
- Defensive coordinator: David Braun (1st season)
- Base defense: Multiple 4–3
- Home stadium: Fargodome

2019 Missouri Valley Football Conference standings
	Conf.			Overall
Team	W		L	W		L
No. 1 North Dakota State $^	8	–	0	16	–	0
No. 5 Northern Iowa ^	6	–	2	10	–	5
No. 7 Illinois State ^	5	–	3	10	–	5
No. 10 South Dakota State ^	5	–	3	8	–	5
Southern Illinois	5	–	3	7	–	5
South Dakota	4	–	4	5	–	7
Indiana State	3	–	5	5	–	7
Youngstown State	2	–	6	6	–	6
Missouri State	1	–	7	1	–	10
Western Illinois	1	–	7	1	–	11
$ – Conference champion; ^ – FCS playoff participant; Rankings from STATS Poll

The 2019 North Dakota State Bison football team represented North Dakota State University in the 2019 NCAA Division I FCS football season. They were led by first-year head coach Matt Entz. The team played in the Fargodome in Fargo, North Dakota, for the 27th season as members of the Missouri Valley Football Conference (MVFC). They entered the season as defending national champions, having won seven of the prior eight FCS titles. In 2019, the Bison finished the regular season 12–0, the second consecutive undefeated Bison season, and won their ninth consecutive MVFC title. They received an automatic qualifying bid to the FCS playoff tournament and were seeded as the No. 1 team. The Bison then went 4–0 in the FCS playoffs to finish 16–0 as FCS champions, becoming the first team at any level of college football to finish a season 16–0 since Yale in 1894. They also extended their FCS-record winning streak to 37 games.

== Preseason ==
=== MVFC poll ===
In the MVFC preseason poll released on July 29, 2019, the Bison were predicted to finish in first place.

=== Preseason All–MVFC team ===
The Bison had six players selected to the preseason all-MVFC team.

Offense

Zack Johnson – OL

Dillon Radunz – OL

Defense

Derrek Tuszka – DL

Jabril Cox – LB

James Hendricks – DB

Garret Wegner – P

== Schedule ==
Date	Time	Opponent	Rank	Site	TV	Result	Attendance
August 31	3:00 p.m.	vs. Butler*	No. 1	Target Field; Minneapolis, MN	NBC ND/ESPN+	W 57–10	34,544
September 7	2:30 p.m.	North Dakota*	No. 1	Fargodome; Fargo, ND (Nickel Trophy)	NBC ND/ESPN+	W 38–7	18,923
September 14	12:00 p.m.	at No. 18 Delaware*	No. 1	Delaware Stadium; Newark, DE	NBC ND/FloSports	W 47–22	14,489
September 21	2:30 p.m.	No. 4 UC Davis*	No. 1	Fargodome; Fargo, ND	NBC ND/ESPN+	W 27–16	18,425
October 5	12:00 p.m.	at No. 10 Illinois State	No. 1	Hancock Stadium; Normal, IL	NBC ND/ESPN+	W 37–3	13,391
October 12	1:00 p.m.	No. 10 Northern Iowa^{†}	No. 1	Fargodome; Fargo, ND	NBC ND/ESPN+	W 46–14	18,178
October 19	2:30 p.m.	Missouri State	No. 1	Fargodome; Fargo, ND	NBC ND/ESPN+	W 22–0	18,252
October 26	2:00 p.m.	at No. 3 South Dakota State	No. 1	Dana J. Dykhouse Stadium; Brookings, SD (Dakota Marker / College GameDay)	NBC ND/ESPN+/Midco	W 23–16	19,371
November 2	5:00 p.m.	at Youngstown State	No. 1	Stambaugh Stadium; Youngstown, OH	NBC ND/ESPN+	W 56–17	11,102
November 9	2:30 p.m.	Western Illinois	No. 1	Fargodome; Fargo, ND	NBC ND/ESPN+	W 57–21	17,411
November 16	2:30 p.m.	South Dakota	No. 1	Fargodome; Fargo, ND	NBC ND/ESPN+/Midco	W 49–14	17,844
November 23	2:00 p.m.	at Southern Illinois	No. 1	Saluki Stadium; Carbondale, IL	NBC ND/ESPN+	W 21–7	5,423
December 7	2:00 p.m.	No. 19 Nicholls*	No. 1	Fargodome; Fargo, ND (FCS Playoffs Second Round)	ESPN3	W 37–13	15,690
December 14	11:00 a.m.	No. 13 Illinois State*	No. 1	Fargodome; Fargo, ND (FCS Playoffs Quarterfinals)	ESPN	W 9–3	14,132
December 21	1:00 p.m.	No. 5 Montana State*	No. 1	Fargodome; Fargo, ND (FCS Playoffs Semifinals)	ESPN2	W 42–14	18,077
January 11	11:00 a.m.	vs. No. 2 James Madison*	No. 1	Toyota Stadium; Frisco, TX (FCS Championship Game)	ABC	W 28–20	17,866
*Non-conference game; ^{†}Homecoming; Rankings from STATS Poll released prior to the game; All times are in Central time

== Game summaries ==
=== Regular season ===
==== Butler ====
Butler Bulldogs (0–0) vs. North Dakota State Bison (0–0)

Quarter	1	2	3	4	Total
Bulldogs	0	0	10	0	10
No. 1 Bison	15	21	14	7	57

at Target Field, Minneapolis, MN

- Date: August 31, 2019
- Game time: 3:00 p.m.
- Game weather: Mostly cloudy; 70 °F (21 °C); Wind: Calm
- Game attendance: 34,544
- Referee: Matt Gallagher
- TV: ESPN+

Statistics	Butler	North Dakota State
First downs	14	25
Plays–yards	60–198	59–605
Rushes–yards	30–88	45–388
Passing yards	110	217
Passing: comp–att–int	16–30–1	12–14–0
Time of possession	30:49	29:11

Team	Category	Player	Statistics
Butler	Passing	Sam Brown	12/26, 85 yds, INT
Butler	Rushing	Brad Sznajder	14 car, 58 yds
Butler	Receiving	John Turley	3 rec, 39 yds
North Dakota State	Passing	Trey Lance	10/11, 185 yds, 4 TD
North Dakota State	Rushing	Trey Lance	5 car, 116 yds, 2 TD
North Dakota State	Receiving	Phoenix Sproles	2 rec, 71 yds, TD

Scoring summary

Quarter	Time	Drive			Team	Scoring information	Score	
Quarter	Time	Plays	Yards	TOP	Team	Scoring information	BUTL	NDSU
1st	10:20	8	90	4:30	NDSU	Trey Lance (#5) 33-yard touchdown run, 2-point run good	0	8
1st	7:58	2	68	0:40	NDSU	Phoenix Sproles (#11) 47-yard touchdown reception from Trey Lance (#5), Griffin Crosa (#36) kick good	0	15
2nd	11:02	5	40	1:36	NDSU	Josh Babicz (#81) 15-yard touchdown reception from Trey Lance (#5), Griffin Crosa (#36) kick good	0	22
2nd	5:24	4	57	2:00	NDSU	Noah Gindorff (#87) 26-yard touchdown reception from Trey Lance (#5), Griffin Crosa (#36) kick good	0	29
2nd	0:45	6	31	3:13	NDSU	Josh Babicz (#81) 3-yard touchdown reception from Trey Lance (#5), Griffin Crosa (#36) kick good	0	36
3rd	9:47	13	63	5:13	BUTL	29-yard field goal by Drew Bevelhimer (#36)	3	36
3rd	9:33				BUTL	Fumble recovery returned 29 yards for touchdown by Dan DelGrosso (#49), Drew Bevelhimer (#36) kick good	10	36
3rd	7:45	5	80	1:45	NDSU	Ty Brooks (#28) 36-yard touchdown run, Griffin Crosa (#36) kick good	10	43
3rd	6:14	1	61	0:11	NDSU	Trey Lance (#5) 61-yard touchdown run, Griffin Crosa (#36) kick good	10	50
4th	9:25	7	72	3:32	NDSU	Saybein Clark (#30) 7-yard touchdown run, Griffin Crosa (#36) kick good	10	57
"TOP" = time of possession. For other American football terms, see Glossary of American football.							10	57

==== North Dakota ====
North Dakota Fighting Hawks (1–0) vs. North Dakota State Bison (1–0)

Quarter	1	2	3	4	Total
Fighting Hawks	0	7	0	0	7
No. 1 Bison	14	7	10	7	38

at Fargodome, Fargo, ND

- Date: September 7, 2019
- Game time: 2:30 p.m.
- Game weather: Indoors; 70 °F (21 °C)
- Game attendance: 18,923
- Referee: Jeremy Valentine
- TV: ESPN+

Statistics	North Dakota	North Dakota State
First downs	14	20
Plays–yards	55–230	65–428
Rushes–yards	26–68	50–266
Passing yards	162	162
Passing: comp–att–int	18–29–2	11–15–0
Time of possession	24:54	35:06

Team	Category	Player	Statistics
North Dakota	Passing	Andrew Zimmerman	16/27, 150 yds, 2 INT
North Dakota	Rushing	James Johannesson	7 car, 21 yds, TD
North Dakota	Receiving	Garett Maag	6 rec, 76 yds
North Dakota State	Passing	Trey Lance	11/15, 162 yds, 2 TD
North Dakota State	Rushing	Trey Lance	16 car, 95 yds, 2 TD
North Dakota State	Receiving	Zach Mathis	1 rec, 41 yds

Scoring summary

Quarter	Time	Drive			Team	Scoring information	Score	
Quarter	Time	Plays	Yards	TOP	Team	Scoring information	UND	NDSU
1st	11:14	9	68	3:40	NDSU	Dimitri Williams (#4) 3-yard touchdown run, Griffin Crosa (#36) kick good	0	7
1st	0:34	10	80	5:35	NDSU	Trey Lance (#5) 8-yard touchdown run, Griffin Crosa (#36) kick good	0	14
2nd	9:20	13	75	6:14	UND	James Johannesson (#33) 3-yard touchdown run, Brady Leach (#27) kick good	7	14
2nd	4:44	8	73	4:30	NDSU	Ben Ellefson (#82) 2-yard touchdown reception from Trey Lance (#5), Griffin Crosa (#36) kick good	7	21
3rd	10:38	7	19	3:36	NDSU	27-yard field goal by Griffin Crosa (#36)	7	24
3rd	4:56	7	78	3:39	NDSU	Noah Gindorff (#87) 34-yard touchdown reception from Trey Lance (#5), Griffin Crosa (#36) kick good	7	31
4th	9:23	14	80	7:06	NDSU	Trey Lance (#5) 14-yard touchdown run, Griffin Crosa (#36) kick good	7	38
"TOP" = time of possession. For other American football terms, see Glossary of American football.							7	38

==== Delaware ====
North Dakota State Bison (2–0) vs. Delaware Fightin' Blue Hens (2–0)

Quarter	1	2	3	4	Total
No. 1 Bison	10	17	6	14	47
No. 18 Fightin' Blue Hens	5	0	3	14	22

at Delaware Stadium, Newark, DE

- Date: September 14, 2019
- Game time: 12:00 p.m.
- Game weather: Overcast; 77 °F (25 °C); Wind: S 8 MPH
- Game attendance: 14,489
- Referee: Matt Overton
- TV: FloSports

Statistics	North Dakota State	Delaware
First downs	26	14
Plays–yards	65–490	57–261
Rushes–yards	41–295	36–125
Passing yards	195	136
Passing: comp–att–int	18–24–0	11–21–1
Time of possession	31:56	28:04

Team	Category	Player	Statistics
North Dakota State	Passing	Trey Lance	18/23, 195 yds, 3 TD
North Dakota State	Rushing	Kobe Johnson	11 car, 101 yds, TD
North Dakota State	Receiving	Phoenix Sproles	3 rec, 72 yds
Delaware	Passing	Nolan Henderson	9/12, 125 yds, 2 TD
Delaware	Rushing	Will Knight	8 car, 115 yds
Delaware	Receiving	Will Knight	3 rec, 46 yds

Scoring summary

Quarter	Time	Drive			Team	Scoring information	Score	
Quarter	Time	Plays	Yards	TOP	Team	Scoring information	NDSU	DELA
1st	13:14				DELA	NDSU Punt blocked by Luke Frederick and recovered for a safety	0	2
1st	10:12	4	35	1:36	NDSU	Kobe Johnson (#24) 1-yard touchdown run, Griffin Crosa (#36) kick good	7	2
1st	5:45	5	26	2:09	NDSU	46-yard field goal by Griffin Crosa (#36)	10	2
1st	2:17	8	14	3:19	DELA	36-yard field goal by Jake Roth (#36)	10	5
2nd	14:11	8	75	3:06	NDSU	Adam Cofield (#18) 24-yard touchdown reception from Trey Lance (#5), Griffin Crosa (#36) kick good	17	5
2nd	6:57	9	42	4:12	NDSU	23-yard field goal by Griffin Crosa (#36)	20	5
2nd	0:30	7	80	2:36	NDSU	Ben Ellefson (#82) 5-yard touchdown reception from Trey Lance (#5), Griffin Crosa (#36) kick good	27	5
3rd	8:47	9	50	4:53	NDSU	Noah Gindorff (#87) 4-yard touchdown reception from Trey Lance (#5), Griffin Crosa (#36) kick no good	33	5
3rd	3:29	11	84	4:35	DELA	23-yard field goal by Jake Roth (#36)	33	8
4th	12:01	8	81	2:50	DELA	Gene Coleman II (#5) 7-yard touchdown reception from Nolan Henderson (#14), 2-point pass good	33	16
4th	9:40	5	75	2:21	NDSU	Adam Cofield (#18) 10-yard touchdown run, Griffin Crosa (#36) kick good	40	16
4th	6:00	7	80	3:35	DELA	Chichi Amachi (#2) 44-yard touchdown reception from Nolan Henderson (#14), 2-point rush failed	40	22
4th	1:46	9	75	4:14	NDSU	Saybein Clark (#30) 20-yard touchdown run, Griffin Crosa (#36) kick good	47	22
"TOP" = time of possession. For other American football terms, see Glossary of American football.							47	22

==== UC Davis ====
UC Davis Aggies (2–1) vs. North Dakota State Bison (3–0)

Quarter	1	2	3	4	Total
No. 4 Aggies	7	6	3	0	16
No. 1 Bison	7	10	3	7	27

at Fargodome, Fargo, ND

- Date: September 21, 2019
- Game time: 2:30 p.m.
- Game weather: Indoors; 70 °F (21 °C)
- Game attendance: 18,425
- Referee: Matt Packowski
- TV: ESPN+

Statistics	UC Davis	North Dakota State
First downs	19	16
Plays–yards	80–422	67–354
Rushes–yards	32–110	44–198
Passing yards	312	156
Passing: comp–att–int	29–48–3	13–23–0
Time of possession	29:33	30:27

Team	Category	Player	Statistics
UC Davis	Passing	Jake Maier	29/48, 312 yds, TD, 3 INT
UC Davis	Rushing	Ulonzo Gilliam Jr.	19 car, 73 yds
UC Davis	Receiving	Jared Harrell	12 rec, 102 yds
North Dakota State	Passing	Trey Lance	13/23, 156 yds
North Dakota State	Rushing	Ty Brooks	11 car, 104 yds
North Dakota State	Receiving	Christian Watson	4 rec, 56 yds

Scoring summary

Quarter	Time	Drive			Team	Scoring information	Score	
Quarter	Time	Plays	Yards	TOP	Team	Scoring information	UCD	NDSU
1st	11:58	6	33	2:27	NDSU	Adam Cofield (#18) 2-yard touchdown run, Griffin Crosa (#36) kick good	0	7
1st	4:59	5	44	2:31	UCD	Wes Preece (#87) 17-yard touchdown reception from Jake Maier (#15), Max O'Rourke (#43) kick good	7	7
2nd	10:28	8	49	3:39	UCD	48-yard field goal by Max O'Rourke (#43)	10	7
2nd	7:24	6	69	2:56	NDSU	Trey Lance (#5) 1-yard touchdown run, Griffin Crosa (#36) kick good	10	14
2nd	0:54	10	66	2:23	UCD	44-yard field goal by Max O'Rourke (#43)	13	14
2nd	0:00	6	39	0:47	NDSU	42-yard field goal by Griffin Crosa (#36)	13	17
3rd	7:32	11	61	5:36	NDSU	26-yard field goal by Griffin Crosa (#36)	13	20
3rd	4:07	10	57	3:23	UCD	40-yard field goal by Max O'Rourke (#43)	16	20
4th	2:50	3	18	0:53	NDSU	Trey Lance (#5) 10-yard touchdown run, Griffin Crosa (#36) kick good	16	27
"TOP" = time of possession. For other American football terms, see Glossary of American football.							16	27

==== Illinois State ====
North Dakota State Bison (4–0) vs. Illinois State Redbirds (3–1)

Quarter	1	2	3	4	Total
No. 1 Bison	16	7	7	7	37
No. 10 Redbirds	3	0	0	0	3

at Hancock Stadium, Normal, IL

- Date: October 5, 2019
- Game time: 12:00 p.m.
- Game weather: Indoors; 70 °F (21 °C)
- Game attendance: 13,391
- Referee: David Siegle
- TV: ESPN+

Statistics	North Dakota State	Illinois State
First downs	22	11
Plays–yards	70–482	51–200
Rushes–yards	55–293	31–79
Passing yards	189	121
Passing: comp–att–int	12–15–0	8–20–0
Time of possession	35:57	24:03

Team	Category	Player	Statistics
North Dakota State	Passing	Trey Lance	12/15, 189 yds, 3 TD
North Dakota State	Rushing	Ty Brooks	9 car, 106 yds, TD
North Dakota State	Receiving	Christian Watson	3 rec, 57 yds, TD
Illinois State	Passing	Brady Davis	8/20, 121 yds
Illinois State	Rushing	James Robinson	20 car, 94 yds
Illinois State	Receiving	Kacper Rutkiewicz	3 rec, 83 yds

Scoring summary

Quarter	Time	Drive			Team	Scoring information	Score	
Quarter	Time	Plays	Yards	TOP	Team	Scoring information	NDSU	ILL ST
1st	11:11	5	56	1:59	NDSU	Noah Gindorff (#87) 35-yard touchdown reception from Trey Lance (#5), Griffin Crosa (#36) kick good	7	0
1st	8:20	3	63	1:13	NDSU	Ty Brooks (#28) 53-yard touchdown run, 2-point rush failed	13	0
1st	2:03	12	56	6:17	ILL ST	25-yard field goal by Sam Fenlason (#36)	13	3
1st	0:07	4	-3	1:44	NDSU	38-yard field goal by Griffin Crosa (#36)	16	3
2nd	2:17	9	80	4:56	NDSU	Adam Cofield (#18) 4-yard touchdown run, Griffin Crosa (#36) kick good	23	3
3rd	2:43	11	80	5:51	NDSU	Christian Watson (#1) 42-yard touchdown reception from Trey Lance (#5), Griffin Crosa (#36) kick good	30	3
4th	7:32	15	92	7:47	NDSU	Ben Ellefson (#82) 7-yard touchdown reception from Trey Lance (#5), Griffin Crosa (#36) kick good	37	3
"TOP" = time of possession. For other American football terms, see Glossary of American football.							37	3

==== Northern Iowa ====
Northern Iowa Panthers (3–2) vs. North Dakota State Bison (5–0)

Quarter	1	2	3	4	Total
No. 10 Panthers	0	14	0	0	14
No. 1 Bison	15	3	7	21	46

at Fargodome, Fargo, ND

- Date: October 12, 2019
- Game time: 1:00 p.m.
- Game weather: Indoors; 70 °F (21 °C)
- Game attendance: 18,178
- Referee: Art Brown
- TV: ESPN+

Statistics	Northern Iowa	North Dakota State
First downs	14	24
Plays–yards	63–339	69–492
Rushes–yards	33–106	51–347
Passing yards	233	145
Passing: comp–att–int	15–30–1	10–18–0
Time of possession	28:20	31:40

Team	Category	Player	Statistics
Northern Iowa	Passing	Will McElvain	15/29, 233 yds, TD
Northern Iowa	Rushing	Tyler Hoosman	12 car, 54 yds, TD
Northern Iowa	Receiving	Isaiah Weston	5 rec, 129 yds, TD
North Dakota State	Passing	Trey Lance	10/18, 145 yds, 3 TD
North Dakota State	Rushing	Adam Cofield	15 car, 104 yds, 2 TD
North Dakota State	Receiving	Phoenix Sproles	3 rec, 59 yds, TD

Scoring summary

Quarter	Time	Drive			Team	Scoring information	Score	
Quarter	Time	Plays	Yards	TOP	Team	Scoring information	UNI	NDSU
1st	10:57	8	77	3:57	NDSU	Phoenix Sproles (#11) 36-yard touchdown reception from Trey Lance (#5), 2-point rush good	0	8
1st	2:12	6	44	2:58	NDSU	Christian Watson (#1) 19-yard touchdown reception from Trey Lance (#5), Griffin Crosa (#36) kick good	0	15
2nd	13:13	2	11	0:44	UNI	Isaiah Weston 17-yard touchdown reception from Will McElvain, Matthew Cook kick good	7	15
2nd	6:29	14	64	6:38	NDSU	25-yard field goal by Griffin Crosa (#36)	7	18
2nd	2:40	8	65	3:49	UNI	Tyler Hoosman 6-yard touchdown run, Matthew Cook kick good	14	18
3rd	13:02	2	35	0:42	NDSU	Noah Gindorff (#87) 30-yard touchdown reception from Trey Lance (#5), Griffin Crosa (#36) kick good	14	25
4th	12:53	11	68	4:51	NDSU	Adam Cofield (#18) 1-yard touchdown run, Griffin Crosa (#36) kick good	14	32
4th	9:05	4	54	1:51	NDSU	Adam Cofield (#18) 37-yard touchdown run, Griffin Crosa (#36) kick good	14	39
4th	2:05	5	65	2:52	NDSU	Kobe Johnson (#24) 50-yard touchdown run, Griffin Crosa (#36) kick good	14	46
"TOP" = time of possession. For other American football terms, see Glossary of American football.							14	46

==== Missouri State ====
Missouri State Bears (1–4) vs. North Dakota State Bison (6–0)

Quarter	1	2	3	4	Total
Bears	0	0	0	0	0
No. 1 Bison	8	7	0	7	22

at Fargodome, Fargo, ND

- Date: October 19, 2019
- Game time: 2:30 p.m.
- Game weather: Indoors; 70 °F (21 °C)
- Game attendance: 18,252
- Referee: Andy Speciale
- TV: ESPN+

Statistics	Missouri State	North Dakota State
First downs	12	22
Plays–yards	57–185	74–447
Rushes–yards	20–21	43–222
Passing yards	164	225
Passing: comp–att–int	20–37–0	21–31–0
Time of possession	25:08	34:52

Team	Category	Player	Statistics
Missouri State	Passing	Peyton Huslig	20/37, 164 yds
Missouri State	Rushing	Myron Mason	4 car, 15 yds
Missouri State	Receiving	Damoriea Vick	6 rec, 72 yds
North Dakota State	Passing	Trey Lance	21/31, 225 yds
North Dakota State	Rushing	Adam Cofield	12 car, 93 yds, 2 TD
North Dakota State	Receiving	Phoenix Sproles	6 rec, 52 yds

Scoring summary

Quarter	Time	Drive			Team	Scoring information	Score	
Quarter	Time	Plays	Yards	TOP	Team	Scoring information	MOST	NDSU
1st	7:40	6	65	3:35	NDSU	Trey Lance (#5) 21-yard touchdown run, 2-point rush good	0	8
2nd	9:44	9	87	4:22	NDSU	Adam Cofield (#18) 1-yard touchdown run, Griffin Crosa (#36) kick good	0	15
4th	5:48	8	54	3:26	NDSU	Adam Cofield (#18) 1-yard touchdown run, Griffin Crosa (#36) kick good	0	22
"TOP" = time of possession. For other American football terms, see Glossary of American football.							0	22

==== South Dakota State ====
North Dakota State Bison (7–0) vs. South Dakota State Jackrabbits (6–1)

Quarter	1	2	3	4	Total
No. 1 Bison	0	3	13	7	23
No. 3 Jackrabbits	6	0	3	7	16

at Dana J. Dykhouse Stadium, Brookings, SD

- Date: October 26, 2019
- Game time: 2:00 p.m.
- Game weather: Sunny; 62 °F (17 °C); Wind: S 15-20 MPH
- Game attendance: 19,371
- Referee: David Siegle
- TV: ESPN+

Statistics	North Dakota State	South Dakota State
First downs	18	19
Plays–yards	59–394	60–330
Rushes–yards	44–332	43–220
Passing yards	62	110
Passing: comp–att–int	7–15–1	7–17–1
Time of possession	30:57	29:03

Team	Category	Player	Statistics
North Dakota State	Passing	Trey Lance	7/14, 62 yds, TD
North Dakota State	Rushing	Ty Brooks	9 car, 97 yds, TD
North Dakota State	Receiving	Phoenix Sproles	1 rec, 24 yds
South Dakota State	Passing	J'Bore Gibbs	3/5, 70 yds
South Dakota State	Rushing	Pierre Strong Jr.	19 car, 120 yds
South Dakota State	Receiving	Cade Johnson	4 rec, 76 yds

Scoring summary

Quarter	Time	Drive			Team	Scoring information	Score	
Quarter	Time	Plays	Yards	TOP	Team	Scoring information	NDSU	SDSU
1st	12:39	6	64	2:21	SDSU	29-yard field goal by Chase Vinatieri (#4)	0	3
1st	2:11	12	72	5:14	SDSU	25-yard field goal by Chase Vinatieri (#4)	0	6
2nd	5:53	15	85	8:15	NDSU	22-yard field goal by Griffin Crosa (#36)	3	6
3rd	8:15	6	80	2:38	NDSU	Ty Brooks (#28) 59-yard touchdown run, Griffin Crosa (#36) kick good	10	6
3rd	5:57	5	14	2:07	NDSU	Ben Ellefson (#82) 6-yard touchdown reception from Trey Lance (#5), 2-point rush good	16	6
3rd	0:56	9	52	5:01	SDSU	40-yard field goal by Chase Vinatieri (#4)	16	9
4th	7:22	9	80	4:54	SDSU	Keaton Heide (#13) 3-yard touchdown run, Chase Vinatieri (#4) kick good	16	16
4th	2:32	4	80	2:24	NDSU	Adam Cofield (#18) 71-yard touchdown run, Griffin Crosa (#36) kick good	23	16
"TOP" = time of possession. For other American football terms, see Glossary of American football.							23	16

==== Youngstown State ====
North Dakota State Bison (8–0) vs. Youngstown State Penguins (5–3)

Quarter	1	2	3	4	Total
No. 1 Bison	21	21	7	7	56
Penguins	0	7	3	7	17

at Stambaugh Stadium, Youngstown, OH

- Date: November 2, 2019
- Game time: 5:00 p.m.
- Game weather: Cloudy; 44 °F (7 °C); Wind: WSW 12 MPH
- Game attendance: 11,102
- Referee: Art Brown
- TV: ESPN+

Statistics	North Dakota State	Youngstown State
First downs	12	16
Plays–yards	45–447	65–279
Rushes–yards	34–251	43–173
Passing yards	196	106
Passing: comp–att–int	9–11–0	11–22–0
Time of possession	24:11	35:49

Team	Category	Player	Statistics
North Dakota State	Passing	Trey Lance	7/9, 160 yds, 3 TD
North Dakota State	Rushing	Kobe Johnson	6 car, 103 yds, TD
North Dakota State	Receiving	Christian Watson; Phoenix Sproles	1 rec, 69 yds, TD; 3 rec, 69 yds
Youngstown State	Passing	Mark Waid	5/10, 52 yds
Youngstown State	Rushing	Mark Waid	8 car, 79 yds, TD
Youngstown State	Receiving	Miles Joiner	3 rec, 37 yds, TD

Scoring summary

Quarter	Time	Drive			Team	Scoring information	Score	
Quarter	Time	Plays	Yards	TOP	Team	Scoring information	NDSU	YSU
1st	10:42	4	25	2:05	NDSU	Trey Lance (#5) 9-yard touchdown run, Griffin Crosa (#36) kick good	7	0
1st	5:22	4	88	1:27	NDSU	Christian Watson (#1) 69-yard touchdown reception from Trey Lance (#5), Griffin Crosa (#36) kick good	14	0
1st	1:09	5	62	2:24	NDSU	Josh Babicz (#81) 6-yard touchdown reception from Trey Lance (#5), Griffin Crosa (#36) kick good	21	0
2nd	9:17	3	41	1:16	NDSU	Josh Babicz (#81) 6-yard touchdown reception from Trey Lance (#5), Griffin Crosa (#36) kick good	28	0
2nd	2:35	5	43	2:35	NDSU	Dimitri Williams (#4) 4-yard touchdown run, Griffin Crosa (#36) kick good	35	0
2nd	0:55	5	33	1:28	YSU	Miles Joiner 23-yard touchdown reception from Joe Craycraft, Colten McFadden kick good	35	7
2nd	0:42				NDSU	Kickoff returned 94 yards for touchdown by Kobe Johnson (#24), Griffin Crosa (#36) kick good	42	7
3rd	7:53	14	77	7:02	YSU	27-yard field goal by Colten McFadden	42	10
3rd	6:20	3	83	1:27	NDSU	Kobe Johnson (#24) 75-yard touchdown run, Griffin Crosa (#36) kick good	49	10
4th	13:49	7	74	3:27	NDSU	Dimitri Williams (#4) 30-yard touchdown run, Griffin Crosa (#36) kick good	56	10
4th	8:17	10	66	5:27	YSU	Mark Waid 27-yard touchdown run, Colten McFadden kick good	56	17
"TOP" = time of possession. For other American football terms, see Glossary of American football.							56	17

==== Western Illinois ====
Western Illinois Leathernecks (1–8) vs. North Dakota State Bison (9–0)

Quarter	1	2	3	4	Total
Leathernecks	0	0	7	14	21
No. 1 Bison	13	14	13	17	57

at Fargodome, Fargo, ND

- Date: November 9, 2019
- Game time: 2:30 p.m.
- Game weather: Indoors; 70 °F (21 °C)
- Game attendance: 17,441
- Referee: Aaron Adams
- TV: ESPN+

Statistics	Western Illinois	North Dakota State
First downs	18	27
Plays–yards	63–308	78–690
Rushes–yards	36–169	49–352
Passing yards	139	338
Passing: comp–att–int	17–27–2	20–29–0
Time of possession	21:10	38:50

Team	Category	Player	Statistics
Western Illinois	Passing	Kevin Johnson	9/12, 84 yds, 2 TD
Western Illinois	Rushing	Tony Tate	6 car, 51 yds
Western Illinois	Receiving	Dennis Houston	3 rec, 40 yds
North Dakota State	Passing	Trey Lance	17/22, 313 yds, 2 TD
North Dakota State	Rushing	Jalen Bussey	6 car, 123 yds, 2 TD
North Dakota State	Receiving	Christian Watson	4 rec, 121 yds, TD

Scoring summary

Quarter	Time	Drive			Team	Scoring information	Score	
Quarter	Time	Plays	Yards	TOP	Team	Scoring information	WIU	NDSU
1st	11:19	5	50	2:27	NDSU	Adam Cofield (#18) 1-yard touchdown run, Griffin Crosa (#36) kick good	0	7
1st	7:48	3	46	1:35	NDSU	Dimitri Williams (#4) 10-yard touchdown run, 2-point rush good	0	13
2nd	13:33	13	80	6:54	NDSU	Trey Lance (#5) 23-yard touchdown run, Griffin Crosa (#36) kick good	0	20
2nd	1:41	3	86	0:35	NDSU	Josh Babicz (#81) 88-yard touchdown reception from Trey Lance (#5), Griffin Crosa (#36) kick good	0	27
3rd	11:58	7	75	3:02	NDSU	Christian Watson (#1) 51-yard touchdown reception from Trey Lance (#5), Griffin Crosa (#36) kick no good	0	33
3rd	9:21	8	72	2:31	WIU	Clint Ratkovich (#25) 9-yard touchdown reception from Kevin Johnson, Nathan Erickson (#33) kick good	7	33
3rd	5:42	8	75	3:39	NDSU	Dimitri Williams (#4) 1-yard touchdown run, Griffin Crosa (#36) kick good	7	40
4th	12:26	5	65	1:41	WIU	George Wahee (#11) 17-yard touchdown reception from Kevin Johnson (#19), Nathan Erickson (#33) kick good	14	40
4th	12:15	1	65	0:17	NDSU	Jalen Bussey (#21) 65-yard touchdown run, Griffin Crosa (#36) kick good	14	47
4th	11:21	4	1	0:48	NDSU	32-yard field goal by Will Cardinal (#15)	14	50
4th	9:04	7	60	2:06	WIU	George Wahee (#11) 28-yard touchdown run, Nathan Erickson (#19) kick good	21	50
4th	8:47	1	45	0:09	NDSU	Jalen Bussey (#21) 45-yard touchdown run, Will Cardinal (#15) kick good	21	57
"TOP" = time of possession. For other American football terms, see Glossary of American football.							21	57

==== South Dakota ====
South Dakota Coyotes (4–6) vs. North Dakota State Bison (10–0)

Quarter	1	2	3	4	Total
Coyotes	0	7	0	7	14
No. 1 Bison	14	14	14	7	49

at Fargodome, Fargo, ND

- Date: November 16, 2019
- Game time: 2:30 p.m.
- Game weather: Indoors; 70 °F (21 °C)
- Game attendance: 17,844
- Referee: David Siegle
- TV: ESPN+

Statistics	South Dakota	North Dakota State
First downs	16	33
Plays–yards	64–245	70–700
Rushes–yards	45–172	52–419
Passing yards	73	281
Passing: comp–att–int	11–19–0	15–18–0
Time of possession	27:40	32:20

Team	Category	Player	Statistics
South Dakota	Passing	Austin Simmons	11/19, 73 yds
South Dakota	Rushing	Kai Henry	8 car, 58 yds, TD
South Dakota	Receiving	Carter Bell	3 rec, 46 yds
North Dakota State	Passing	Trey Lance	12/15, 249 yds, 2 TD
North Dakota State	Rushing	Ty Brooks	11 car, 128 yds, 2 TD
North Dakota State	Receiving	Christian Watson	3 rec, 94 yds, TD

Scoring summary

Quarter	Time	Drive			Team	Scoring information	Score	
Quarter	Time	Plays	Yards	TOP	Team	Scoring information	USD	NDSU
1st	9:22	8	84	3:02	NDSU	Ty Brooks (#28) 2-yard touchdown run, Griffin Crosa (#36) kick good	0	7
1st	4:33	6	58	2:11	NDSU	Adam Cofield (#18) 7-yard touchdown run, Griffin Crosa (#36) kick good	0	14
2nd	14:53	5	90	2:02	NDSU	Ben Ellefson (#82) 32-yard touchdown reception from Trey Lance (#36), Griffin Crosa (#36) kick good	0	21
2nd	7:50	9	90	4:33	NDSU	Christian Watson (#1) 43-yard touchdown reception from Trey Lance (#5), Griffin Crosa (#36) kick good	0	28
2nd	5:01	7	65	2:49	USD	Kai Henry (#2) 1-yard touchdown run, Mason Lorber (#31) kick good	7	28
3rd	12:13	5	68	2:39	NDSU	Hunter Luepke (#44) 7-yard touchdown run, Griffin Crosa (#36) kick good	7	35
3rd	6:58	8	60	3:18	NDSU	Ty Brooks (#28) 4-yard touchdown run, Griffin Crosa (#36) kick good	7	42
4th	14:56	10	66	4:59	NDSU	Hunter Luepke (#44) 3-yard touchdown reception from Zeb Noland (#8), Griffin Crosa (#36) kick good	7	49
4th	7:03	19	74	7:46	USD	Canaan Brooks (#25) 2-yard touchdown run, Mason Lorber (#31) kick good	14	49
"TOP" = time of possession. For other American football terms, see Glossary of American football.							14	49

==== Southern Illinois ====
North Dakota State Bison (11–0) vs. Southern Illinois Salukis (7–4)

Quarter	1	2	3	4	Total
No. 1 Bison	7	0	7	7	21
Salukis	0	7	0	0	7

at Saluki Stadium, Carbondale, IL

- Date: November 23, 2019
- Game time: 2:00 p.m.
- Game weather: Overcast; 39 °F (4 °C); NW 11 MPH
- Game attendance: 5,423
- Referee: Matt Gallagher
- TV: ESPN+

Statistics	North Dakota State	Southern Illinois
First downs	22	14
Plays–yards	68–392	52–276
Rushes–yards	45–246	42–206
Passing yards	146	70
Passing: comp–att–int	13–23–0	6–10–1
Time of possession	31:14	28:46

Team	Category	Player	Statistics
North Dakota State	Passing	Trey Lance	13/23, 146 yds
North Dakota State	Rushing	Adam Cofield	15 car, 87 yds, TD
North Dakota State	Receiving	Jimmy Kepouros	6 rec, 80 yds
Southern Illinois	Passing	Kare Lyles	6/10, 70 yds, INT
Southern Illinois	Rushing	Javon Williams Jr.	23 car, 117 yds, TD
Southern Illinois	Receiving	Avante Cox	2 rec, 25 yds

Scoring summary

Quarter	Time	Drive			Team	Scoring information	Score	
Quarter	Time	Plays	Yards	TOP	Team	Scoring information	NDSU	SIU
1st	9:59	10	91	5:01	NDSU	Kobe Johnson (#24) 44-yard touchdown run, Griffin Crosa (#36) kick good	7	0
2nd	9:35	10	60	5:40	SIU	Javon Williams (#15) 28-yard touchdown run, Nico Gualdoni (#99) kick good	7	7
3rd	5:15	10	74	5:34	NDSU	Adam Cofield (#18) 8-yard touchdown run, Griffin Crosa (#36) kick good	14	7
4th	11:36	13	86	6:50	NDSU	Trey Lance 34-yard touchdown run, Griffin Crosa (#36) kick good	21	7
"TOP" = time of possession. For other American football terms, see Glossary of American football.							21	7

=== FCS Playoffs ===
The Bison entered the postseason tournament as the number one seed, with a first-round bye.

==== Nicholls ====
Nicholls Colonels (9–4) vs. North Dakota State Bison (12–0)

Quarter	1	2	3	4	Total
No. 19 Colonels	3	7	3	0	13
No. 1 (1) Bison	7	7	10	13	37

at Fargodome, Fargo, ND

- Date: December 7, 2019
- Game time: 2:30 p.m.
- Game weather: Indoors; 70 °F (21 °C)
- Game attendance: 15,690
- Referee: Bob Johnson
- TV announcers (ESPN3): Jim Barbar, John Gregory

Statistics	Nicholls	North Dakota State
First downs	18	21
Plays–yards	56–265	57–434
Rushes–yards	41–171	41–265
Passing yards	94	169
Passing: comp–att–int	11–15–2	10–16–0
Time of possession	26:31	33:29

Team	Category	Player	Statistics
Nicholls	Passing	Chase Fourcade	11/15, 94 yds, TD, 2 INT
Nicholls	Rushing	Julien Gums	15 car, 77 yds
Nicholls	Receiving	Dai'Jean Dixon	4 rec, 66 yds, TD
North Dakota State	Passing	Trey Lance	10/16, 169 yds, 2 TD
North Dakota State	Rushing	Trey Lance	11 car, 88 yds, TD
North Dakota State	Receiving	Jimmy Kepouros	2 rec, 62 yds, TD

Scoring summary

Quarter	Time	Drive			Team	Scoring information	Score	
Quarter	Time	Plays	Yards	TOP	Team	Scoring information	NICH	NDSU
1st	3:03	9	62	3:17	NICH	35-yard field goal by Gavin Lasseigne (#46)	3	0
1st	0:00	6	6	84	NDSU	Phoenix Sproles (#11) 55-yard touchdown run, Will Cardinal (#15) kick good	3	7
2nd	12:53	12	82	2:03	NICH	Dai'Jean Dixon (#5) 25-yard touchdown reception from Chase Fourcade (#9), Gavin Lasseigne (#46) kick good	10	7
2nd	4:13	6	80	3:36	NDSU	Jimmy Kepouros (#19) 43-yard touchdown reception from Trey Lance (#5), Will Cardinal (#15) kick good	10	14
3rd	10:36	8	69	4:24	NICH	23-yard field goal by Gavin Lasseigne (#46)	13	14
3rd	6:26	4	2	1:26	NDSU	32-yard field goal by Will Cardinal (#15)	13	17
3rd	2:58	4	13	1:55	NDSU	Noah Gindorff (#87) 3-yard touchdown reception from Trey Lance (#5), Will Cardinal (#15) kick good	13	24
4th	8:21	12	85	6:30	NDSU	Trey Lance (#5) 6-yard touchdown run, Will Cardinal (#15) kick good	13	31
4th	3:12	5	44	2:58	NDSU	Dimitri Williams (#4) 3-yard touchdown run, Will Cardinal (#15) kick no good	13	37
"TOP" = time of possession. For other American football terms, see Glossary of American football.							13	37

==== Illinois State ====
Illinois State Redbirds (10–4) vs. North Dakota State Bison (13–0)

Quarter	1	2	3	4	Total
No. 13 Redbirds	0	0	3	0	3
No. 1 (1) Bison	0	9	0	0	9

at Fargodome, Fargo, ND

- Date: December 14, 2019
- Game time: 11:00 a.m.
- Game weather: Indoors; 70 °F (21 °C)
- Game attendance: 14,132
- Referee: Matt Overton
- TV announcers (ESPN): Jay Alter, Ray Bentley

Statistics	Illinois State	North Dakota State
First downs	9	15
Plays–yards	48–194	64–263
Rushes–yards	40–160	43–128
Passing yards	34	135
Passing: comp–att–int	3–8–1	10–21–0
Time of possession	27:33	32:27

Team	Category	Player	Statistics
Illinois State	Passing	Bryce Jefferson	3/8, 34 yds, INT
Illinois State	Rushing	James Robinson	24 car, 94 yds
Illinois State	Receiving	James Robinson	1 rec, 16 yds
North Dakota State	Passing	Trey Lance	10/21, 135 yds
North Dakota State	Rushing	Ty Brooks	8 car, 49 yds
North Dakota State	Receiving	Christian Watson	7 rec, 107 yds

Scoring summary

Quarter	Time	Drive			Team	Scoring information	Score	
Quarter	Time	Plays	Yards	TOP	Team	Scoring information	ILL ST	NDSU
2nd	14:23	9	40	3:51	NDSU	38-yard field goal by Griffin Crosa (#36)	0	3
2nd	10:00	5	50	2:18	NDSU	33-yard field goal by Griffin Crosa (#36)	0	6
2nd	0:27	17	69	7:23	NDSU	22-yard field goal by Griffin Crosa (#36)	0	9
3rd	2:02	12	70	6:27	ILL ST	27-yard field goal by Sam Fenlason (#36)	3	9
"TOP" = time of possession. For other American football terms, see Glossary of American football.							3	9

==== Montana State ====
Montana State Bobcats (11–3) vs. North Dakota State Bison (14–0)

Quarter	1	2	3	4	Total
No. 5 (5) Bobcats	0	7	7	0	14
No. 1 (1) Bison	7	22	7	6	42

at Fargodome, Fargo, ND

- Date: December 21, 2019
- Game time: 1:00 p.m.
- Game weather: Indoors; 70 °F (21 °C)
- Game attendance: 18,077
- Referee: Steve Hazle
- TV: ESPN2

Statistics	Montana State	North Dakota State
First downs	13	21
Plays–yards	61–298	58–541
Rushes–yards	39–148	37–318
Passing yards	150	223
Passing: comp–att–int	13–22–1	15–21–0
Time of possession	30:34	29:26

Team	Category	Player	Statistics
Montana State	Passing	Tucker Rovig	13/22, 150 yds, TD, INT
Montana State	Rushing	Isaiah Ifanse	11 car, 60 yds
Montana State	Receiving	Kevin Kassis	2 rec, 45 yds, TD
North Dakota State	Passing	Trey Lance	15/21, 223 yds, 3 TD
North Dakota State	Rushing	Christian Watson	3 car, 86 yds, TD
North Dakota State	Receiving	Christian Watson	2 rec, 88 yds, TD

Scoring summary

Quarter	Time	Drive			Team	Scoring information	Score	
Quarter	Time	Plays	Yards	TOP	Team	Scoring information	MON ST	NDSU
1st	7:35	12	73	6:39	NDSU	Trey Lance (#5) 8-yard touchdown run, Griffin Crosa (#36) kick good	0	7
2nd	12:44	8	78	4:08	MON ST	Travis Jonsen (#10) 1-yard touchdown run, Tristan Bailey (#23) kick good	7	7
2nd	12:34	1	75	0:10	NDSU	Christian Watson (#1) 75-yard touchdown reception from Trey Lance (#5), Griffin Crosa (#36) kick good	7	14
2nd	10:51	1	70	0:10	NDSU	Christian Watson (#1) 70-yard touchdown run, 2-point pass good	7	22
2nd	0:24	15	75	8:20	NDSU	Jimmy Kepouros (#19) 6-yard touchdown reception from Trey Lance (#5), Griffin Crosa (#36) kick good	7	29
3rd	6:27	2	45	0:41	MON ST	Kevin Kassis (#85) 41-yard touchdown reception from Tucker Rovig (#12), Tristan Bailey (#23) kick good	14	29
3rd	4:46	3	78	1:37	NDSU	Dimitri Williams (#4) 73-yard touchdown reception from Trey Lance (#5), Griffin Crosa (#36) kick good	14	36
4th	13:23	2	50	0:45	NDSU	Trey Lance (#5) 6-yard touchdown run, 2-point pass failed	14	42
"TOP" = time of possession. For other American football terms, see Glossary of American football.							14	42

==== James Madison ====
James Madison Dukes (14–1) vs. North Dakota State Bison (15–0)

Quarter	1	2	3	4	Total
No. 2 (2) Dukes	7	3	3	7	20
No. 1 (1) Bison	7	14	0	7	28

at Toyota Stadium, Frisco, TX

- Date: January 11, 2020
- Game time: 11:00 a.m.
- Game weather: Cloudy; 30 °F (−1 °C); Wind: WNW 16 MPH
- Game attendance: 17,866
- Referee: Kelly Holman
- TV announcers (ESPN2): Mark Jones, Dusty Dvoracek, Olivia Dekker

Statistics	James Madison	North Dakota State
First downs	24	20
Plays–yards	78–365	55–353
Rushes–yards	45–161	45–281
Passing yards	204	72
Passing: comp–att–int	22–33–1	6–10–0
Time of possession	31:43	28:17

Team	Category	Player	Statistics
James Madison	Passing	Ben DiNucci	22/33, 204 yds, 2 TD, INT
James Madison	Rushing	Percy Agyei-Obese	18 car, 73 yds
James Madison	Receiving	Riley Stapleton	10 rec, 100 yds, 2 TD
North Dakota State	Passing	Trey Lance	6/10, 72 yds
North Dakota State	Rushing	Trey Lance	30 car, 166 yds, TD
North Dakota State	Receiving	Noah Gindorff	1 rec, 22 yds

Scoring summary

Quarter	Time	Drive			Team	Scoring information	Score	
Quarter	Time	Plays	Yards	TOP	Team	Scoring information	JMU	NDSU
1st	7:27	17	86	7:33	JMU	Riley Stapleton (#10) 5-yard touchdown reception from Ben DiNucci (#6), Ethan Ratke (#91) kick good	7	0
1st	3:30	8	70	3:54	NDSU	Adam Cofield (#18) 1-yard touchdown run, Jake Reinholz (#37) kick good	7	7
2nd	14:50	4	69	2:13	NDSU	Phoenix Sproles (#11) 38-yard touchdown run, Jake Reinholz (#37) kick good	7	14
2nd	9:37	11	56	5:13	JMU	26-yard field goal by Ethan Ratke (#91)	10	14
2nd	3:47	12	81	5:46	NDSU	James Hendricks (#6) 20-yard touchdown run, Jake Reinholz (#37) kick good	10	21
3rd	8:45	10	50	4:02	JMU	27-yard field goal by Ethan Ratke (#91)	13	21
4th	14:50	6	65	2:50	NDSU	Trey Lance (#5) 44-yard touchdown run, Jake Reinholz (#37) kick good	13	28
4th	6:55	11	46	4:29	JMU	Riley Stapleton (#10) 5-yard touchdown reception from Ben DiNucci (#6), Ethan Ratke kick good	20	28
"TOP" = time of possession. For other American football terms, see Glossary of American football.							20	28

== Ranking movements ==
AP Poll

Ranking movements Legend: ██ Increase in ranking ██ Decrease in ranking — = Not ranked RV = Received votes
	Week																
Poll	Pre	1	2	3	4	5	6	7	8	9	10	11	12	13	14	15	Final
AP	—	—	—	—	—	—	—	—	—	—	—	—	—	RV	RV	RV	—

FCS polls

Ranking movements Legend: ( ) = First-place votes
	Week														
Poll	Pre	1	2	3	4	5	6	7	8	9	10	11	12	13	Final
STATS FCS	1 (142)	1 (148)	1 (149)	1 (150)	1 (153)	1 (152)	1 (155)	1 (155)	1 (156)	1 (154)	1 (155)	1 (153)	1 (156)	1 (152)	1 (153)

== Personnel ==
=== Coaching staff ===
Name	Position	Alma mater	Year Entering
Matt Entz	Head Coach	Wartburg College	1st
Randy Hedberg	Associate head coach/Passing Game Coordinator/quarterbacks	Minot State	6th
Tyler Roehl	Offensive coordinator/Tight ends / Fullbacks	North Dakota State	6th
David Braun	Defensive coordinator/Safeties	Winona State	1st
Nick Goeser	Special teams coordinator /Defensive tackles	Wisconsin–Eau Claire	10th
Buddha Williams	Defensive ends	Charleston	3rd
Kody Morgan	Cornerbacks	Wisconsin–Stevens Point	4th
Grant Olson	Linebackers	North Dakota State	1st
AJ Blazek	Offensive line	Iowa	1st
Dan Larson	Running backs	Wisconsin–Eau Claire	1st
Noah Pauley	Wide receivers	Minnesota Duluth	1st
Ean Deno	Recruiting coordinator	Minnesota State–Moorhead	1st
Luke Olson	Quality control	Minnesota	1st

== Players drafted into the NFL ==
Round	Pick	Player	Position	NFL team
7	254	Derrek Tuszka	OLB	Denver Broncos
