= 2000 Cotton Bowl Classic =

2000 Southwestern Bell Cotton Bowl Classic
- 64th Cotton Bowl Classic
- The Cotton Bowl in Dallas, Texas, hosted the Cotton Bowl Classic.
Arkansas Razorbacks	Texas Longhorns
(7–4)	(9–4)
SEC	Big 12
27	6
Head coach: Houston Nutt	Head coach: Mack Brown
AP / Coaches / BCS; 24 / NR / NR	AP / Coaches / BCS; 14 / 18 / 15
	1	2	3	4	Total
Arkansas	3	0	7	17	27
Texas	0	3	3	0	6
- Date: January 1, 2000
- Season: 1999
- Stadium: Cotton Bowl
- Location: Dallas, Texas
- MVP: Offensive: RB Cedric Cobbs, Arkansas; Defensive: DT D.J. Cooper, Arkansas
- Referee: Jim Harvey (C-USA)
- Attendance: 72,723

United States TV coverage
- Network: Fox
- Announcers: Thom Brennaman, Tim Green, Dave Lapham, and Mike Doocy

The 2000 SBC Cotton Bowl Classic game was a post-season college football bowl game that took place on Jan. 1, 2000 in Dallas, Texas. The Arkansas Razorbacks defeated the Texas Longhorns 27–6.

The Texas Longhorns finished their regular season 9-3 and were champions of the Big 12 South. However, a 22–6 loss to #3 Nebraska in the Big 12 Championship Game sent them to the Cotton Bowl Classic.

Arkansas, on the other hand, finished the regular season at 7–4, and accepted an at-large bid out of the Southeastern Conference. This was the first meeting between the former Southwest Conference rivals since Arkansas left the now defunct league after the 1991 season, to join the SEC. Arkansas won the last meeting in 1991, 14–13.

The game was a defensive struggle in the first half, with the teams tied 3–3 at halftime. After Arkansas took a 10–3 lead, Texas settled for a field goal to cut Arkansas' lead to 10–6. A huge goal line stand by the Razorbacks kept the Horns out of the end zone, turning the ball over to the Hogs on downs inside the one yard line. Arkansas QB Clint Stoerner threw from his own end zone to a streaking Anthony Lucas to get the ball across mid-field, on a huge third down play. Texas QB Major Applewhite injured his knee in the second half, and was replaced by freshman Chris Simms. The result was the same for Texas, as Arkansas' defense dogged the Longhorn offense all game long. Arkansas freshman RB Cedric Cobbs finally broke free of the Texas defense for a 37-yard touchdown run, and Arkansas scored 17 unanswered points en route to a 27–6 victory. For his role in the win, Cedric Cobbs was named the Offensive MVP of the Game. Senior defensive tackle D. J. Cooper was the Defensive MVP. The swarming Razorbacks defense held Texas to negative rushing yards, and sacked the Longhorn quarterbacks a total of 8 times.

This was Arkansas' first bowl victory in fifteen years (1985 Holiday Bowl), and their first Cotton Bowl championship since winning the 1976 Cotton Bowl Classic over Georgia, 31–10.

== Scoring summary ==
1st Quarter

Arkansas- Tony Dodson 25 yard field goal 6:02 ARK 3 UT 0

2nd Quarter

Texas- Kris Stockton 35 yard field goal 7:51 ARK 3 UT 3

3rd Quarter

Arkansas- Cedric Cobbs 30 yard pass from Clint Stoerner (Tony Dodson kick) 5:44 ARK 10 UT 3

Texas- Kris Stockton 22 yard field goal 1:07 ARK 10 UT 6

4th Quarter

Arkansas- Michael Jenkins 42 yard run (Tony Dodson kick) 12:48 ARK 17 UT 6

Arkansas- Cedric Cobbs 37 yard run (Tony Dodson kick) 10:19 ARK 24 UT 6

Arkansas- Tony Dodson 27 yard field goal 2:46 ARK 27 UT 6

Offensive MVP: RB Cedric Cobbs – 15 carries, 98 yards, 1 TD; 1 reception, 30 yards, 1 TD

Defensive MVP: DT D. J. Cooper – 7 tackles, 3 tfl, 2 sacks

== See also ==
- Arkansas–Texas football rivalry
