= Cedric Cobbs =

American football player (born 1981)

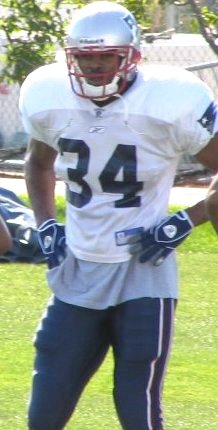
- Cobbs in 2005

No. 34
- Position: Running back

Personal information
- Born: January 9, 1981 (age 45); Little Rock, Arkansas, U.S.
- Listed height: 6 ft 1 in (1.85 m)
- Listed weight: 225 lb (102 kg)

Career information
- High school: Little Rock (AR) Fair
- College: Arkansas
- NFL draft: 2004: 4th round, 128th overall pick

Career history
- New England Patriots (2004); Denver Broncos (2005–2006); Arkansas Twisters (2008)

Awards and highlights
- Super Bowl champion (XXXIX); First-team All-SEC (2003); Freshman All-SEC (1999)
- Stats at Pro Football Reference

Cedric Cobbs (born January 9, 1981) is an American former professional football running back who played for two seasons in the National Football League (NFL) and one season in the af2. He was selected by the New England Patriots in the fourth round of the 2004 NFL draft and played one season with the team. He played for the Denver Broncos in 2006 and for the Arkansas Twisters in 2008.

== Early life ==
Cobbs attended J.A. Fair High School in Little Rock, Arkansas. He was the number one recruit in the state as a senior and was considered one of the top ten running backs in the nation by most recruiting services. Cobbs lead the War Eagles to an undefeated state championship during his senior season in 1998. He was a highly recruited prospect out of high school, and chose Arkansas over several teams, to include Oklahoma, Texas, Texas A&M, LSU, Ole Miss, Tennessee, Alabama, Georgia, and Nebraska.

J.A. Fair closed in 2020 when it was merged with another school.

== College career ==
Cobbs attended college at the University of Arkansas, where he played football for five years.

During his freshman season in 1999, Cobbs set the freshman rushing record at Arkansas (668 yards), but it has since been broken by former Razorback running back Darren McFadden. Cobbs was named to the SEC All-Freshman team in 1999, and led Arkansas to a 27–6 victory over the Texas Longhorns in the 2000 Cotton Bowl on New Year's Day in Dallas, Texas. Cobbs was named the Offensive MVP for the game after scoring touchdowns rushing and receiving.

He suffered a season ending injury early in the 2000 season, and took a medical redshirt as a sophomore.

Cobbs packed on weight over the next two years, ballooning up to over 250 lbs. He never really returned to his freshman prowess until his senior season in 2003, when he slimmed back down to around 220 lbs after working out with the Arkansas track team in the off-season. He was a back up running back in 2001 and 2002, having lost his starting job to Fred Talley.

As a senior, Cobbs led the Razorbacks to a 9–4 mark in 2003, and was named 1st team All-Southeastern Conference, after rushing for 1,320 yards and 10 touchdowns. Cobbs was also named the Offensive MVP of the 2003 Independence Bowl, leading Arkansas to a 27–14 victory over the Missouri Tigers, rushing 27 times for 141 yards and one touchdown.

He finished his collegiate football career with 3,018 rushing yards, good enough for fifth place in school history.

== Professional career ==
=== National Football League ===
Cobbs was selected in the fourth round (128th overall) of the 2004 NFL draft by the New England Patriots. After helping the Patriots win Super Bowl XXXIX as a rookie, he was released during final roster cuts on August 29, 2005. He was acquired by the Denver Broncos in 2006, via free agency. He played in two games and gained nine yards on three rushing attempts. He was released by the Broncos on May 1, 2007, but re-signed on August 21. He was released in the first round of roster cuts six days later.

Cobbs appeared on the NFL radar again in March 2008, when he attended the largest NFL Pro Day in Arkansas football history. Cobbs worked out with the running backs in front of 45 NFL team officials. Cobbs was unable to make an NFL team for the 2008 season. He also attended the 2009 Pro Day at the university, joining former Razorback wide receiver Marcus Monk in attempting to make an NFL roster.

=== af2 ===
Cobbs was activated, and made his arena football debut against the Iowa Barnstormers on June 28, 2008.

== Boxing career ==
Cobbs took part in a professional boxing match at Bumpus Harley Davidson in Memphis, Tennessee. The match, which was the main event, was part of a charity event for an "Anti-Bullying Campaign." Cobbs' opponent was local boxer Sugi Foxx; he entered the night with an 0–9 record. According to Boxrec.com Cobbs was TKO'd in the second round of a scheduled four round bout.
