= J. A. Fair High School =

Location
- 13420 David O. Dodd Road; Little Rock, Arkansas 72210; United States; 34°42′22″N 92°24′40″W

Information
- Type: Public
- Established: 1982
- Closed: 2020
- School district: Little Rock School District (1987-2020); Pulaski County Special School District (1982-1987)
- NCES School ID: 050900001389
- Principal: Michael Anthony
- Staff: 75.02 (FTE)
- Grades: 9–12 (1987-2020); 7-12 (1982-1987)
- Enrollment: 726 (2018-19)
- Student to teacher ratio: 9.68
- Colors: Navy blue, white, silver
- Athletics conference: 5A Central (2014-16)
- Mascot: War Eagles

J. A. Fair High School (FHS) was a four-year public high school located in Little Rock, Arkansas, United States. J. A. Fair was one of four comprehensive high schools of the Little Rock School District. Beginning the 2014 school year, J. A. Fair was placed under academic distress, changing its name from J. A. Fair Systems Magnet High School to J. A. Fair High School of College and Career Academies.

Fair was originally a part of the Pulaski County Special School District. It opened in August 1982 (with additions in 1983, 1984 and a classroom and cafeteria addition in 2004) and is named for James Augustus "Gus" Fair. The school operated as a junior/senior high school (grades 7-12) from 1982 to 1987. It was annexed by the Little Rock School District and converted to a senior high school in 1987. In 2000, J. A. Fair became a magnet school and offers magnet programs in environmental science, systems engineering/information sciences and medical studies. The school was divided into academies: The Academy of Environmental Science, Enterprise Mobile Network Management Academy, and The Academy of Sports Medicine, along with a Freshman Academy. It closed in 2020 with the opening of Little Rock Southwest High School.

== History ==
J.A. Fair High School was established in 1981, with construction completed and doors open to students in August 1982. The school was named for James Augustus Fair, an educator, who spent his career as a biology teacher, administrator and after retirement served on the Pulaski County School Board.

From its opening in 1982 through June 1987, FHS served as a junior/senior high school (grades 7-12) for the Pulaski County Special School District. In August 1987, FHS opened as solely a senior high school for the Little Rock School District, one of 14 schools annexed to enhance desegregation efforts. FHS became a magnet school in the fall of 2000.

In 2016 Michael Anthony became the principal.

Fair was replaced by a new high school in southwest Little Rock that began construction in 2017, and opened as Little Rock Southwest High School in 2020.

== Academics ==
The school features three magnet programs: Environmental Science, Information Science & Systems Engineering, and Medical Science, along with a Freshman Academy, High Schools That Work (HSTW), SECME. A variety of academic programs (which include 15 AP courses and a Community Based Instruction Program for students with moderate to severe disabilities), sports, club, and activity offerings.

Three College and Career Academies: The Academy of Environmental Science, Enterprise Mobile Network Management Academy, and The Academy of Sports Medicine, along with a Freshman Academy. Academy-specific courses in technology, environmental studies, and sports medicine will drive the curriculum. Common groups of cross-disciplinary teachers will work with common groups of students throughout the academic year. All academy courses will target hands-on, project-based learning. The Business Industry will regularly interact with the students and teachers. Students will be required to create advanced senior projects designed to reflect high levels of college and career preparedness. We have an in-depth ongoing partnership with the University of Arkansas at Little Rock Department of Information Science via the Information Technology and E-Commerce Program and USDA. Year-round, regularly scheduled professional development will be provided to all teachers targeting learning goals aligned with technology. Students will be provided opportunities to gain industry certification and possible college credit.

J A. Fair has also partnered with the Arkansas AIMS to strengthen the teaching of the AP® mathematics, science, and English courses and to build enrollment and increase the number of students taking and earning qualifying scores on AP® exams in these subjects.. A variety of academic programs (which include 15 AP courses and a Community Based Instruction Program for students with moderate to severe disabilities), sports, club, and activity offerings.

== Athletics ==
The school mascot and athletic emblem is the War Eagle with the school colors of silver, blue (navy), and white.

Between the years of 2012–14, the J.A. Fair War Eagles participated in the 6A Classification within the 7A/6A South Conference as administered by the Arkansas Activities Association. Due to the enrollment count of J.A. Fair in the fall of 2014, they were reclassified within the 5A Central Conference for the 2014-2016 school years. The War Eagles competes in football, volleyball, cross country (boys/girls), bowling (boys/girls), swimming (boys/girls), basketball (boys/girls), soccer (boys only), baseball, softball, and track and field (boys/girls).

- Football: The War Eagles Football team won state football 5A championship in the fall of 1998, going on to defeat Cabot High School 41-0 continuing an undefeated season with a 14–0 record. The school placed 11 players on the Arkansas Democrat-Gazette's All Metro team following the victory led by Dameon Ashford, Tye Forte(QB), Faquan Harris, Gustavo Pena(K), and future NFL player Cedric Cobbs(RB).
- Basketball: With the Help of Mr Basketball Kim Adams, the War Eagles Basketball team won state basketball 5A championship in 2000 going on to defeat Fort Smith Southside 49-35 completing an undefeated season of 31–0. The War Eagles won another state championship in 2003 led by senior Vince Hunter who won the MVP of the Class 4A state tournament, he averaged 15.0 points, 12.0 rebounds and 8.0 blocked shots a game as a senior.
- Cross Country: The War Eagles boys cross country team won a state cross country championship in fall 2001.
- Tennis: The War Eagles boys tennis team won a state tennis championship in spring 1998.
- Track and field: The War Eagles boys track team won a state track championship in spring 1999 led by All-American Nominee Kyle Cleveland.

== Notable alumni ==
- Kris Bankston (born 1999), basketball player in the Israeli Basketball Premier League
