= 2020 NCAA Division I Football Championship Game =

Postseason college football game

2020 NCAA Division I Football Championship
- FCS National Championship Game
James Madison Dukes	North Dakota State Bison
(14–1)	(15–0)
CAA	MVFC
20	28
Head coach: Curt Cignetti	Head coach: Matt Entz
STATS / Seed; 2 / 2	STATS / Seed; 1 / 1
	1	2	3	4	Total
James Madison	7	3	3	7	20
North Dakota State	7	14	0	7	28
- Date: January 11, 2020
- Season: 2019
- Stadium: Toyota Stadium
- Location: Frisco, Texas
- MVP: Trey Lance (QB, North Dakota State)
- Favorite: James Madison by 2
- Referee: Kelly Holman (Big Sky)
- Attendance: 17,866

United States TV coverage
- Network: ABC
- Announcers: Mark Jones (play-by-play), Dusty Dvoracek (analyst), Olivia Dekker (sideline)
- Nielsen ratings: 2.686 million

The 2020 NCAA Division I Football Championship Game was a postseason college football game that determined a national champion in the NCAA Division I Football Championship Subdivision for the 2019 season. It was played at Toyota Stadium in Frisco, Texas, on January 11, 2020, with kickoff at 12:00 p.m. EST (11:00 a.m. local CST), and television coverage on ABC. It was the culminating game of the 2019 FCS Playoffs.

== Teams ==
The participants of the 2020 NCAA Division I Football Championship Game were the finalists of the 2019 FCS Playoffs—North Dakota State and James Madison—which began with a 24-team bracket. This was a rematch of the 2018 FCS Championship Game, won by North Dakota State, 17–13. Entering the game, North Dakota State and James Madison had won every FCS championship, with North Dakota State winning eight and James Madison winning one, since the 2010 Eastern Washington Eagles won the 2011 FCS Championship Game.

=== North Dakota State Bison ===
North Dakota State entered the game with a 15–0 record. They were 12–0 during the regular season, finishing atop the Missouri Valley Football Conference with an 8–0 conference record. The Bison received the top seed for the FCS playoffs, entitling them to a first-round bye. They then defeated Nicholls, Illinois State, and Montana State to reach the championship game. North Dakota entered the title match with a 36-game winning streak, having not lost since falling to South Dakota State on November 4, 2017.

This was North Dakota State's eighth FCS title game; they were 7–0 in prior championship game appearances, having won titles for the 2011, 2012, 2013, 2014, 2015, 2017, and 2018 seasons. During the 2016 playoffs, they were denied a spot in the title game due to a semifinal loss to James Madison.

=== James Madison Dukes ===
James Madison entered the game with a 14–1 record. They were 11–1 during the regular season, finishing atop the Colonial Athletic Association with an 8–0 conference record. Their only loss was to FBS program West Virginia, 20–13, on August 31. The Dukes received the second seed for the FCS playoffs, entitling them to a first-round bye. They then defeated Monmouth, Northern Iowa, and Weber State to reach the championship game.

This was James Madison's fourth and final FCS title game; they were 2–1 in prior championship game appearances, having won titles for the 2004 and 2016 seasons. This would be the last time the team would be in an FCS championship game as the team moved to the FBS level two years later.

== Game summary ==
2020 NCAA Division I Football Championship Game

Quarter	1	2	3	4	Total
No. 2 James Madison	7	3	3	7	20
No. 1 North Dakota State	7	14	0	7	28

at Toyota Stadium • Frisco, Texas

- Date: Saturday, January 11, 2020
- Game time: 12:00 p.m. EST (11:00 a.m. CST)
- Game attendance: 17,866
- Referee: Kelly Holman
- TV announcers (ABC): Mark Jones (play-by-play), Dusty Dvoracek (analyst), Olivia Dekker (sideline)
- ESPN game summary

Game information

First Quarter

- (7:27) JMU – Ben DiNucci 5 yard pass to Riley Stapleton, Ethan Ratke kick (Drive: 17 plays, 86 yards, 7:33; James Madison 7–0)
- (3:30) NDSU – Adam Cofield 1 yard rush, Jake Reinholz kick (Drive: 8 plays, 70 yards, 3:54; Tied 7–7)

Second Quarter

- (14:50) NDSU – Phoenix Sproles 38 yard rush, Jake Reinholz kick (Drive: 4 plays, 69 yards, 2:13; North Dakota State 14–7)
- (9:37) JMU – Ethan Ratke 26 yard field goal (Drive: 11 plays, 56 yards, 5:13; North Dakota State 14–10)
- (3:47) NDSU – James Hendricks 20 yard rush, Jake Reinholz kick (Drive: 12 plays, 81 yards, 5:46; North Dakota State 21–10)

Third Quarter

- (8:45) JMU – Ethan Ratke 27 yard field goal (Drive: 10 plays, 50 yards, 4:02; North Dakota State 21–13)

Fourth Quarter

- (14:50) NDSU – Trey Lance 44 yard rush, Jake Reinholz kick (Drive: 6 plays, 65 yards, 2:50; North Dakota State 28–13)
- (6:55) JMU – Ben DiNucci 5 yard pass to Riley Stapleton, Ethan Ratke kick (Drive: 11 plays, 46 yards, 4:29; North Dakota State 28–20)

=== Statistics ===
Statistics	JMU	NDSU
First downs	24	20
Total yards	365	353
Rushes–yards	45–161	45–281
Passing yards	204	72
Passing: Comp–Att–Int	22–33–1	6–10–0
Time of possession	31:43	28:17

Team	Category	Player	Statistics
James Madison	Passing	Ben DiNucci	22/33, 204 yards, 2 TD, 1 INT
James Madison	Rushing	Percy Agyei-Obese	18 carries, 73 yards
James Madison	Receiving	Riley Stapleton	10 receptions, 100 yards, 2 TD
North Dakota State	Passing	Trey Lance	6/10, 72 yards
North Dakota State	Rushing	Trey Lance	30 carries, 166 yards, 1 TD
North Dakota State	Receiving	Noah Gindorff	1 reception, 22 yards
