= Little Rock West High School =

High school in Arkansas, United States

Coordinates: 34.8076°N 92.4593°W

Little Rock West High School (LRW), also known as Little Rock West High School of Innovation (LRWHSOI) is a public high school in Little Rock, Arkansas and a part of the Little Rock School District.

The 70,000-square-foot (6,500 m^{2}) building has three stories. It is adjacent to Pinnacle View Middle School and is on a 22-acre (8.9 ha) property.

== History ==
Arkansas state level politicians promoted the idea of expanding Pinnacle View Middle School, located in the former headquarters of Leisure Arts, to the high school level. The high school was to be established in a former office building next to Pinnacle View Middle.

Little Rock West opened in 2019 with the ninth grade, having 64 students, and in 2020 it had 120 students. The building has a capacity of about 100 students per grade. The first 12th grade class will graduate in 2023.

Due to the incompletion of Little Rock West, and the small student body of around 300, the school is merging with Hall STEAM Magnet High School up until the completion of Little Rock West in 2026. The two schools now go under the name of Hall-West School of Innovation.
