= Trey Lance =

American football player (born 2000)

No. 5 – Los Angeles Chargers
- Position: Quarterback
- Roster status: Injured reserve

Personal information
- Born: May 9, 2000 (age 26); Marshall, Minnesota, U.S.
- Listed height: 6 ft 4 in (1.93 m)
- Listed weight: 226 lb (103 kg)

Career information
- High school: Marshall Senior
- College: North Dakota State (2018–2020)
- NFL draft: 2021: 1st round, 3rd overall pick

Career history
- San Francisco 49ers (2021–2022); Dallas Cowboys (2023–2024); Los Angeles Chargers (2025–present)

Awards and highlights
- 2× FCS national champion (2018, 2019); 2020 NCAA Division I Championship Game MVP; Walter Payton Award (2019); Jerry Rice Award (2019); MVFC Offensive Player of the Year (2019); First-team All-MVFC (2019)

Career NFL statistics as of 2025
- Passing attempts: 200
- Passing completions: 108
- Completion percentage: 54.0%
- TD–INT: 5–5
- Passing yards: 1,289
- Passer rating: 71.9
- Rushing yards: 361
- Rushing touchdowns: 1
- Stats at Pro Football Reference

Trey Aubrey Lance (born May 9, 2000) is an American professional football quarterback for the Los Angeles Chargers of the National Football League (NFL). He played college football for the North Dakota State Bison, winning the Walter Payton and Jerry Rice awards in 2019 en route to a victory in the 2020 NCAA Division I Football Championship Game. Lance was selected third overall by the San Francisco 49ers in the 2021 NFL draft, but limited play and injuries led to him being traded after two seasons to the Dallas Cowboys. Lance spent two seasons as a backup with the Cowboys before signing with the Chargers in 2025.

== Early life ==
Lance was born on May 9, 2000, in Marshall, Minnesota. He was trained mainly by his father, Carlton, a former cornerback for the Saskatchewan Roughriders of the Canadian Football League and the London Monarchs of the World League of American Football.

Lance played running back in youth football and first played at quarterback in middle school. He later attended Marshall High School, where he was viewed as the best quarterback prospect in Minnesota. Lance initially wanted to play at the University of Minnesota and had been ready to commit there after attending a recruiting event in February 2017. However, he was deemed a wide receiver or defensive back prospect by them and other Power Five schools. Lance eventually committed to North Dakota State in December 2017.

== College career ==
Lance was redshirted at North Dakota State for the 2018 season, but played in two games in which he recorded two rushing touchdowns.

Lance was named the starter in 2019 and led the Bison to the 2020 NCAA Division I Football Championship Game and was named the MVP after the 28–20 victory. He finished the season completing 192-of-287 passes for 2,786 yards, 28 touchdowns, and no interceptions, an NCAA record for most passing attempts in a season without an interception while also rushing for 1,100 yards and 14 touchdowns. For his performance that season, Lance won the Walter Payton Award as the FCS's most outstanding offensive player and the Jerry Rice Award as the FCS's best freshman.

Lance was set to start again in 2020 before the season was postponed due to the COVID-19 pandemic. His only game appearance that season was in a single game against Central Arkansas in October 2020. Lance threw for two touchdowns and ran for an additional two, while throwing the only interception of his college career. The Bison were scheduled to make up the rest of the season in early 2021, but Lance announced following the game that he would opt out to prepare for the 2021 NFL draft.

== Professional career ==
Pre-draft measurables
Height	Weight	Arm length	Hand span	Wingspan
6 ft 3 7/8 in (1.93 m)	224 lb (102 kg)	31 1/2 in (0.80 m)	9 1/8 in (0.23 m)	6 ft 4 3/4 in (1.95 m)
All values from Pro Day

=== San Francisco 49ers ===
==== 2021 ====
Ahead of the 2021 NFL draft, most analysts predicted Lance or Alabama quarterback Mac Jones would be taken third overall by the San Francisco 49ers, who traded up with the Miami Dolphins in exchange for their first-round picks in 2021, 2022, and 2023 and their third-round pick in 2022. The 49ers selected Lance, making him their first first-round quarterback since Alex Smith in 2005 and the second-highest drafted FCS player after fellow NDSU quarterback Carson Wentz. Considered a top quarterback prospect in the draft, Lance was one of five quarterbacks taken in the first round. He signed his four-year rookie contract, worth $34.1 million, on July 28, 2021.

Lance began the 2021 season as the second-string quarterback behind incumbent starter Jimmy Garoppolo, but made his NFL debut in Week 1 against the Detroit Lions. Lance was used in one play during the first quarter, in which he contributed to the eventual 41–33 road victory by throwing a five-yard touchdown pass to wide receiver Trent Sherfield. Two weeks later against the Green Bay Packers, Lance took the field for two plays and scored a rushing touchdown in the first as the 49ers narrowly lost by a score of 30–28.

During a Week 4 28–21 loss to the Seattle Seahawks, Lance saw his first significant playing time when he relieved an injured Garoppolo in the second half. Lance completed nine of 18 passes for 157 yards and two touchdowns and rushed seven times for 41 yards and a two-point conversion. Due to Garoppolo's injury, Lance was named the starter for the following week's game against the Arizona Cardinals. Lance completed 15-of-29 passes for 192 yards and an interception while also rushing 16 times for 89 yards in the 17–10 road loss. Following the game, it was announced Lance suffered a sprained knee. The injury made him unavailable for the Week 7 matchup against the Indianapolis Colts, with Nate Sudfeld replacing Lance as the second option behind a returning Garoppolo. Lance returned as Garoppolo's backup during the next week's 33–22 victory over the Chicago Bears. Lance did not take field again until the 49ers' final drive against the Jacksonville Jaguars in Week 11. He rushed for seven yards before taking the victory formation to complete the 30–10 road victory.

Lance remained the second-string quarterback for the next five weeks until Garoppolo suffered a thumb injury during a 20–17 road loss to the Tennessee Titans. Making his second start in Week 17 against the Houston Texans, Lance threw for 249 yards, two touchdowns, and an interception during the 23–7 victory, earning Lance his first career win. Lance's start marked his final appearance in 2021 after Garoppolo returned for the regular season finale against the Los Angeles Rams. Lance held a backup role during the 49ers' playoff run, which concluded with a road loss to the Rams in the NFC Championship Game. Following the season, Lance revealed he spent the year battling a right index finger injury he suffered in a preseason game against the Las Vegas Raiders.

==== 2022 ====
Lance was named the starter over Garoppolo for the season, but only appeared in two games before suffering a season-ending ankle injury against the Seahawks in Week 2 that required surgery. His only full game of the season was the season opener against the Bears, where he completed 13-of-28 passes for 164 yards and an interception in a 19–10 road loss.

==== 2023 ====
Lance entered the 2023 training camp on uncertain terms due to his limited play with the 49ers and the success of second-year quarterback Brock Purdy the previous season, who helped lead the 49ers to the 2022 NFC Championship Game. Ahead of the season, Lance was named the third-string backup behind Purdy and free agent acquisition Sam Darnold, which led to further speculation over his future in San Francisco. Lance completed 22-of-33 passes for 285 yards with two touchdowns and an interception while playing in San Francisco's first two preseason games against the Las Vegas Raiders and Denver Broncos; he did not play in the team's final preseason game against the Los Angeles Chargers.

=== Dallas Cowboys ===
==== 2023 season ====
On August 26, 2023, Lance was traded to the Dallas Cowboys for a 2024 fourth-round pick (Malik Mustapha). He was later named the third-string quarterback and was a healthy scratch the whole season.

==== 2024 season ====
On May 1, 2024, the Cowboys declined the fifth-year option on Lance's contract, making him a free agent after the 2024 season. During the preseason, Lance saw the most action at quarterback in place of starter Dak Prescott and backup Cooper Rush. During a 26–19 preseason loss to the Los Angeles Chargers, Lance completed 33 of 49 passes for 323 yards and a touchdown but was intercepted five times.

After Prescott suffered a season-ending injury in Week 9, Lance was elevated to the backup role behind Rush. He made his Cowboys regular season debut the following week against the Philadelphia Eagles, replacing an ineffective Rush in the fourth quarter. In his first regular season action since 2022, Lance completed four of six passes for 21 yards, but was sacked on his first play, and threw an interception. The Cowboys started Lance in the season finale against the Washington Commanders, where he had 244 passing yards during the 23–19 loss.

=== Los Angeles Chargers ===
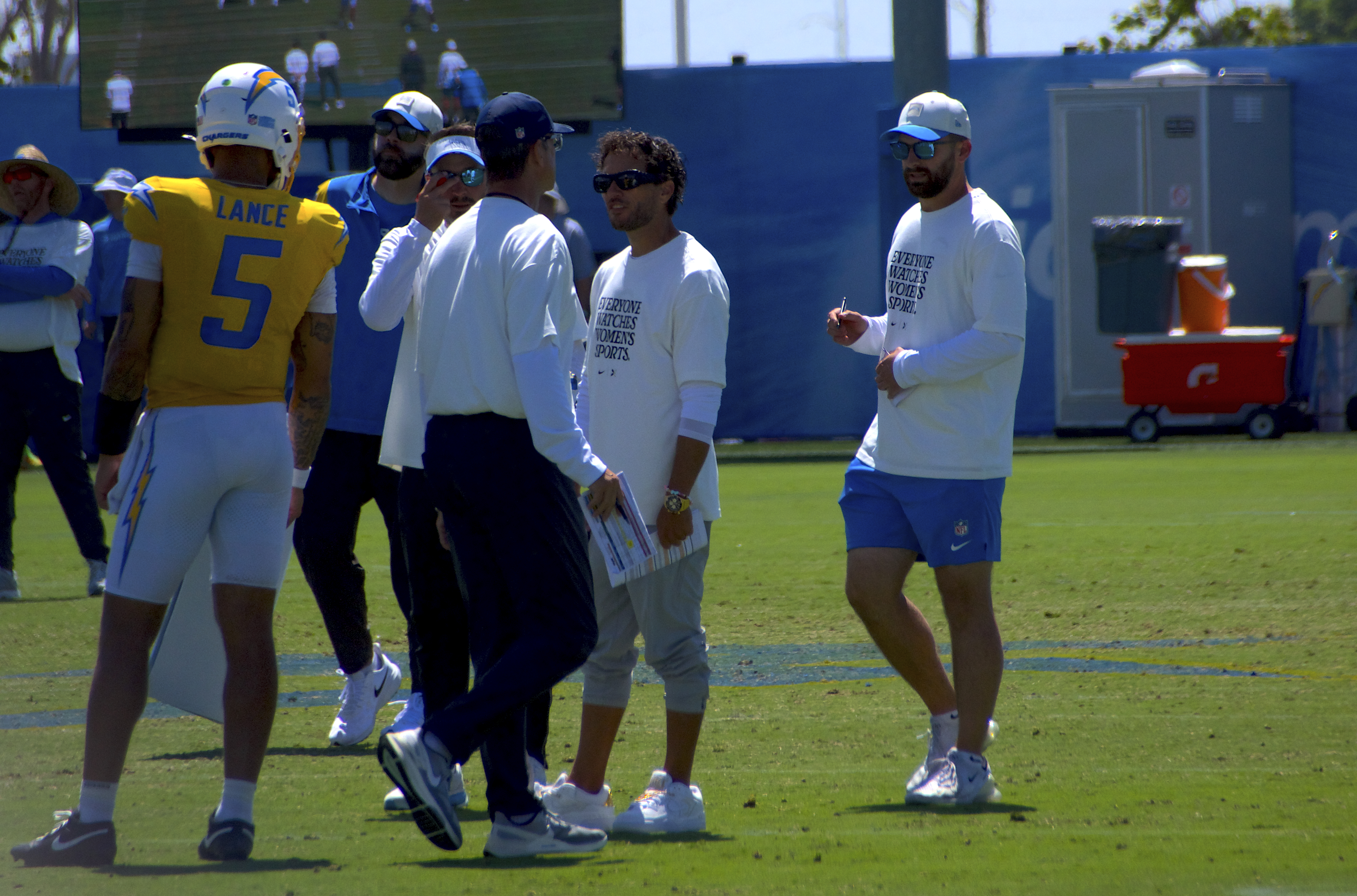
Lance (left) with coaches Jim Harbaugh and Mike McDaniel at the Chargers' 2026 training camp

On April 4, 2025, Lance signed a one-year $2,000,000 contract with the Los Angeles Chargers with $1.5 million guaranteed. He backed up Justin Herbert for the 2025 season, but started the final game of the regular season against the Denver Broncos while Herbert was resting for the playoffs. In the 19–3 loss, Lance completed 20 of 44 passes for 134 yards and had an interception returned by Ja'Quan McMillian for a touchdown; he also led the Chargers in rushing yards with 69.

On March 14, 2026, Lance re-signed with the Chargers on a one-year, $6.75 million contract.

== Career statistics ==
=== NFL ===
Legend
**Bold**	Career high

Year	Team	Games			Passing									Rushing					Sacks		Fumbles	
Year	Team	GP	GS	Record	Cmp	Att	Pct	Yds	Y/A	Lng	TD	Int	Rtg	Att	Yds	Y/A	Lng	TD	Sck	Yds	Fum	Lost
2021	SF	6	2	**1–1**	**41**	**71**	57.7	**603**	**8.5**	**76**	**5**	**2**	**97.3**	**38**	**168**	4.4	15	**1**	4	15	0	0
2022	SF	2	2	**1–1**	15	31	48.4	194	6.3	44	0	1	55.0	16	67	4.2	13	0	2	9	**1**	0
2023	DAL	0	0	–	DNP																	
2024	DAL	4	1	0–1	25	41	**61.0**	266	6.5	33	0	1	69.8	11	41	3.7	11	0	4	23	0	0
2025	LAC	4	1	0–1	27	57	47.4	226	4.0	28	0	1	50.8	17	85	**5.0**	**22**	0	**6**	**44**	**1**	**1**
Career		16	6	2–4	108	200	54.0	1,289	6.4	76	5	5	71.9	82	361	4.4	22	1	16	91	2	1

=== College ===
Season	Team	Games			Passing								Rushing			
Season	Team	GP	GS	Record	Cmp	Att	Pct	Yds	Avg	TD	Int	Rtg	Att	Yds	Avg	TD
2018	North Dakota State	2	0	0–0	1	1	**100.0**	12	**12.0**	0	0	**200.8**	8	82	**10.3**	2
2019	North Dakota State	**16**	**16**	**16–0**	**192**	**287**	66.9	**2,786**	9.7	**28**	0	180.6	**169**	**1,100**	6.5	**14**
2020	North Dakota State	1	1	1–0	15	30	50.0	149	5.0	2	**1**	107.1	15	143	9.5	2
Career		19	17	17–0	208	318	65.4	2,947	9.3	30	1	173.8	192	1,325	6.9	18

== Personal life ==
Lance is an Evangelical Christian and was a leader of his local Fellowship of Christian Athletes chapter in high school. His younger brother, Bryce, also played at North Dakota state and is currently a wide receiver for the New Orleans Saints.
