= Kris Bankston =

American basketball player (born 1999)

No. 30 – Türk Telekom
- Position: Power forward / center
- League: BSL; EuroCup

Personal information
- Born: June 11, 1999 (age 27) Pine Bluff, Arkansas, U.S.
- Listed height: 6 ft 9 in (2.06 m)
- Listed weight: 230 lb (104 kg)

Career information
- High school: J. A. Fair (Little Rock, Arkansas)
- College: Little Rock (2017–2021); Norfolk State (2021–2023)
- NBA draft: 2023: undrafted
- Playing career: 2023–present

Career history
- 2023–2024: Aris Midea Thessaloniki
- 2024: Hapoel Be'er Sheva
- 2024–2025: Tofaş
- 2025–present: Türk Telekom

Kristeon Lamar Bankston (born June 11, 1999) is an American professional basketball player who plays forward and center for Türk Telekom of the Turkish Basketbol Süper Ligi (BSL) and the EuroCup. He attended the University of Arkansas at Little Rock, and played basketball for the Little Rock Trojans. As a sophomore in 2018–19 he led the NCAA in two-point field goal percentage percentage at 82.0%. He transferred to Norfolk State University, where he played for the Norfolk State Sparts. In 2021–22 he had a .711 two-point field goal percentage, leading the Mid-Eastern Athletic Conference. In July 2023, he played for the Minnesota Timberwolves' NBA Summer League team. In 2023, he played with Aris Midea Thessaloniki in the Greek Basket League, and with Hapoel Be'er Sheva.

== Early life ==
Bankston was born in Pine Bluff, Arkansas, to Kristery Holly and Dameon Bankston. He has three siblings; brothers Damareon and Deaveon, and sister, Kayla . He is 6-9 tall, and weighs 230 pounds.

== High school career ==
Bankston played basketball at J.A. Fair High School in Little Rock, Arkansas. As a senior, he averaged 13 points, 13 rebounds, five blocks, four assists, and four steals a game.

== College career ==
Bankston attended the University of Arkansas at Little Rock, and played basketball for the Little Rock Trojans, playing the forward position. As a freshman in 2017-18 he averaged 4.0 points, 4.0 rebounds, and 1.0 blocks (10th in the Sun Belt Conference) per game, with a field goal percentage of 62.3%. As a sophomore in 2018-19 he averaged 8.2 points, 4.5 rebounds, and 1.1 blocks (5th) per game, and led the NCAA and set the team's single-season two-point field goal percentage percentage at 82.0%. As a junior in 2019-20 he played three games before missing the rest of the season with an injury, and averaged 9.7 points and 3.3 rebound, shooting 82.4% from the floor. In his redshirt season of 2020-21 he played only 16 games and 11.5 minutes per game, and averaged 3.4 points and 1.8 rebounds per game.

After the coronavirus epidemic Bankston transferred to Norfolk State University, where he played forward for the Norfolk State Spartans. In 2021-22 he averaged 11.0 points, 6.8 rebounds (3rd in the Mid-Eastern Athletic Conference; MEAC), and 1.2 blocks (4th) per game, with a .711 two-point field goal percentage (1st in the MEAC, 7th in the NCAA, and a school single-season record). He was named 2021-22 All-MEAC 2nd Team, and 2021-22 MEAC All-Defense, while also being named NSU AD Honor Roll both semesters. In 2022-23 he averaged 14.2 points (5th in the MEAC), 7.1 rebounds (2nd), and 1.5 blocks (2nd) per game, with a .694 two-point field goal percentage (1st in the MEAC). He was named 2022-23 All-MEAC 1st Team, 2022-23 MEAC All-Defense, and 2023 All-MEAC Tournament.

In college, in 143 games Bankston scored 70.8% of his field goal attempts.

Following the 2022-23 season, he played in the Portsmouth Invitational Tournament, averaging 8.3 points, 6.0 rebounds, 1.3 blocks, and 1.7 steals per game in three games. On April 2, 2023, Bankston was an Historically Black Colleges and Universities (HBCU) All-Star at the 2nd Annual HBCU All-Star Game in Houston, Texas.

In April 2023, Bankston jumped a vertical jump of 34.5 inches at the HBCU Pro Day Combine, which would have been second-best at the 2022 NBA Combine.

== Professional career ==
In July 2023, Bankston played for the Minnesota Timberwolves' NBA Summer League team in Las Vegas, Nevada. In a total of 34 minutes of play, he had 11 rebounds, 3 steals, and 2 blocks.

=== Aris Midea Thessaloniki ===
In 2023 he played with Aris Midea Thessaloniki. Bankston was 9th in the Greek Basket League with an average of 0.8 blocks per game, as he averaged 8.2 points and shot 70.2% on two-point shots from the field.

=== Hapoel Be'er Sheva ===
On July 17, 2023, Bankston signed with Hapoel Be'er Sheva of the Israeli Basketball Premier League, for whom he has played forward and center, wearing uniform #30. He has been playing for the team since. He said: "This is a once in a lifetime opportunity, and I am blessed to be able to experience it."

=== Tofaş ===
On July 5, 2024, he signed with Tofaş of Basketbol Süper Ligi (BSL).

=== Türk Telekom ===
On July 3, 2025, he signed with Türk Telekom of the Turkish Basketbol Süper Ligi (BSL).

== Career statistics ==
Legend
GP	Games played	GS	Games started	MPG	Minutes per game
FG%	Field goal percentage	3P%	3-point field goal percentage	FT%	Free throw percentage
RPG	Rebounds per game	APG	Assists per game	SPG	Steals per game
BPG	Blocks per game	PPG	Points per game	**Bold**	Career high

=== College ===
Year	Team	GP	GS	MPG	FG%	3P%	FT%	RPG	APG	SPG	BPG	PPG
2017–18	Little Rock	30	15	15.0	.623	.000	.455	4.0	.5	.3	1.0	4.0
2018–19	Little Rock	31	17	21.6	.813	.000	.507	4.5	**1.1**	.7	1.1	8.2
2019–20	Little Rock	3	3	17.7	**.824**	–	**1.000**	3.3	1.0	.3	.7	9.7
2020–21	Little Rock	16	0	11.5	.585	–	.545	1.8	.5	.3	.3	3.4
2021–22	Norfolk State	31	31	27.4	.711	–	.539	6.8	1.0	**.9**	1.2	11.0
2022–23	Norfolk State	**32**	**32**	**29.9**	.688	**.400**	.709	**7.1**	.9	**.9**	**1.5**	**14.2**
Career		143	98	22.1	.708	.286	.582	5.1	.9	.6	1.1	8.8
