= Little Rock Southwest High School =

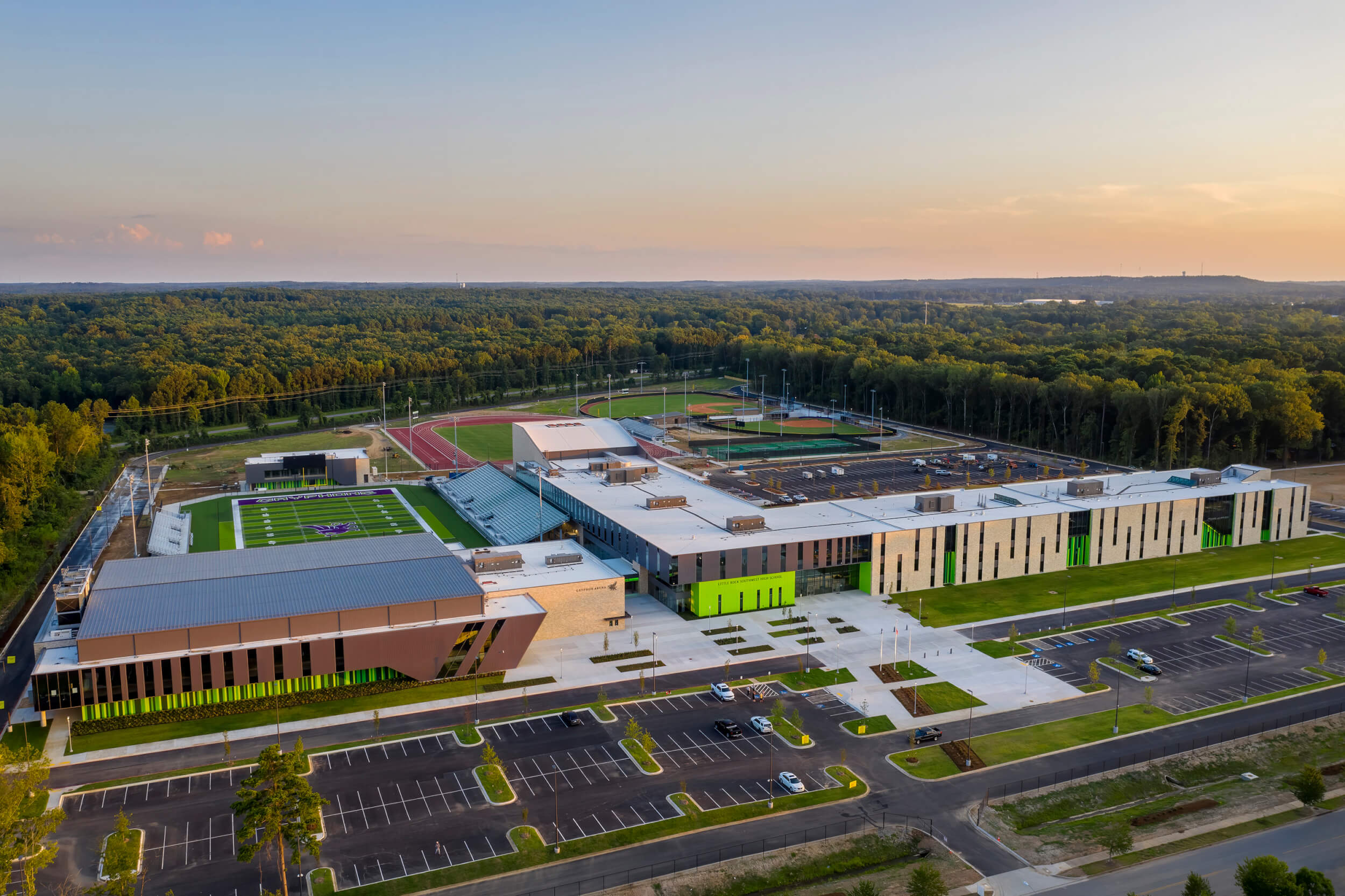

Location
- 9715 Mabelvale Pike; Little Rock, Arkansas 72103; United States
- 34.662240°N 92.385830°W

Information
- Type: Public
- Established: 2020
- School district: Little Rock School District
- Principal: George E. Maxey
- Teaching staff: 157.18 (on an FTE basis)
- Grades: 9–12
- Enrollment: 2,045 (2023–2024)
- Student to teacher ratio: 13.76
- Color: Purple White Kelly Green
- Athletics conference: 7A Central
- Mascot: Gryphons
- Website: www.lrsd.org/o/lrsw/

Little Rock Southwest High School, also known as Little Rock Southwest Magnet High School, is a public high school in southwest Little Rock, Arkansas.

Groundbreaking occurred in 2017. It replaced J. A. Fair Systems Magnet High School and McClellan Magnet High School. Additionally it took over the attendance area for Hall High School, which was converted into Hall STEAM Magnet High School, a magnet only school.

It has 400,000 square feet (37,000 m^{2}) of space. There are 65 classrooms, with each having 900 square feet (84 m^{2}) of space. It opened as scheduled in 2020. It had 1,930 students in September 2020.
