= John L. McClellan High School =

Location
- 9417 Geyer Springs Road; Little Rock, Arkansas 72209; United States; 34°39′52″N 92°20′34″W

Information
- Type: Public
- Established: 1965
- Closed: 2020
- School district: Little Rock School District (1987-2020); Pulaski County Special School District (1965-1987)
- Staff: 69.37 (FTE)
- Grades: 9–12
- Enrollment: 690 (2018-19)
- Student to teacher ratio: 9.95
- Colors: Red, white, and blue
- Mascot: Crimson Lion
- Team name: McClellan Crimson Lions

John L. McClellan High School was a high school in Little Rock, Arkansas. McClellan served students in grades nine through twelve and was part of the Little Rock School District from 1987 to 2020 and part of the Pulaski County Special School District before joining the Little Rock School District. It closed when Little Rock Southwest High School opened.

== History ==
It opened in 1965 as a part of the Pulaski County district; it replaced Mabelvale High School. McClellan graduated its first senior class in 1966. This class was also the final senior high school class at what is now Mabelvale Middle school. In 1967, U.S. Senator John L. McClellan officially dedicated the school. In subsequent years, McClellan boasted of many successes such as being the Model Technology High School for the LRSD, a 1998 National Blue Ribbon School designation, and a two-time Top Business Education Program in the United States. McClellan students won many awards over the years and earned scholarships to schools across the country.

McClellan was replaced by a new high school in southwest Little Rock that began construction in 2017, and opened as Little Rock Southwest High School in 2020.

== Curriculum ==
The assumed course of study for McClellan students meets or exceeds the Smart Core curriculum developed by the Arkansas Department of Education (ADE) to complete 22 units prior to graduation. In 1991, principal Jodie T. Carter developed a community school model and its associated magnet program. The school is accredited by the ADE and since 1959, by AdvancED.

== Extracurricular activities ==
The McClellan High School mascot was the Crimson Lion, and the school colors were red, white, and blue. The McClellan Crimson Lions participated in baseball, basketball (boys/girls), football, soccer (boys), softball, tennis (boys/girls), golf, track and field (boys/girls), and volleyball.

McClellan's basketball program won seven conference titles, finished as state champion runner-up twice, and made 18 consecutive state tournaments. The McClellan basketball program won the Class 5A state title in 2015. McClellan's track program won several conference titles (including back-to-back titles in 2001 and 2002), finished as state runner-up, and also won a state title. In fall 2015, McClellan's football program played in the Class 5A state championship game for the first time since 1994, finishing as a state runner-up. McClellan was also home to the Arkansas winner of the Wendy's High School Heisman Award, Tiffany Gunn.

McClellan students can participate in 36 clubs and organizations as well as in band, choir, football, basketball, soccer, bowling, tennis, softball, cheerleading, flag line, and track.

== Notable alumni ==
- Jermain Taylor - professional boxing champion
- Keith Jackson Jr. – Pro football player
- Reggie Arnold – Arkansas State All-Conference football player
- Tyler Knight – Mississippi Valley State All-American football player
- Pierre Strong Jr. - South Dakota State All-American football player
