= Pierre Strong Jr. =

American football player (born 1998)

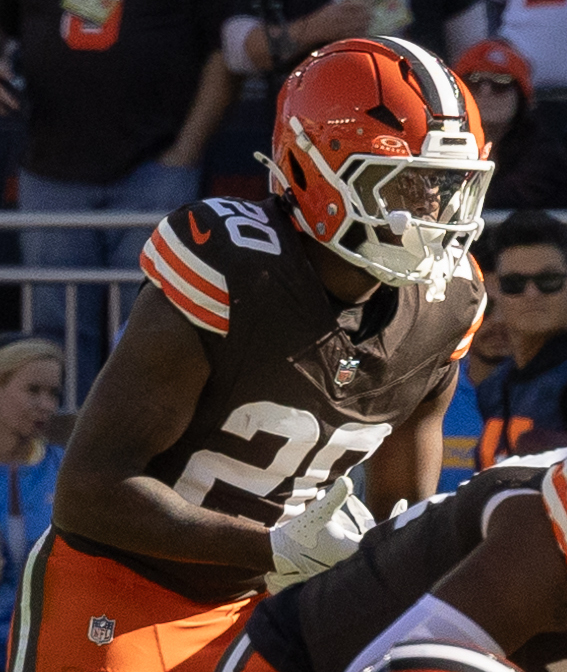
- Strong with the Cleveland Browns in 2024

No. 22 – Green Bay Packers
- Position: Running back
- Roster status: Practice squad

Personal information
- Born: December 10, 1998 (age 27); Little Rock, Arkansas, U.S.
- Listed height: 5 ft 11 in (1.80 m)
- Listed weight: 207 lb (94 kg)

Career information
- High school: John L. McClellan (Little Rock)
- College: South Dakota State (2017–2021)
- NFL draft: 2022: 4th round, 127th overall pick

Career history
- New England Patriots (2022); Cleveland Browns (2023–2024); Green Bay Packers (2025–present)

Awards and highlights
- First-team FCS All-American (2021); 3× First-team All-MVFC (2019–2021); MVFC Freshman of the Year (2018)

Career NFL statistics as of Week 10, 2026
- Rushing yards: 558
- Rushing average: 4.5
- Rushing touchdowns: 2
- Receptions: 36
- Receiving yards: 254
- Return yards: 570
- Stats at Pro Football Reference

Pierre Strong Jr. (born December 10, 1998) is an American professional football running back for the Green Bay Packers of the National Football League (NFL). He played college football for the South Dakota State Jackrabbits.

== Early life ==
Strong grew up in Little Rock, Arkansas and graduated from John L. McClellan High School. As a junior, he rushed 2,248 yards and 30 touchdowns as McClellan advanced to the Class 5A state championship game. Despite his season ending injury that occurred at Little Rock McClellan's final drive of the 2016 regular game against Pulaski Academy, Strong rushed 1,423 total yards and scored 25 touchdowns during his senior year. Overall, Strong had totaled 4,268 rushing yards and scored 57 touchdowns over his final two seasons in McClellan. He was named a Landers Award finalist in his senior year due to his accomplishments.

Although he was offered very few scholarships from NCAA Division I schools, Strong was ultimately recruited and given a scholarship by South Dakota State University as he made a verbal commitment in January 2017.

== College career ==
Strong redshirted his true freshman season. In this status, he rushed for 1,116 yards and 11 touchdowns and was named the Missouri Valley Football Conference (MVFC) Freshman of the Year. Strong gained 1,018 yards and scored eight touchdowns on 143 carries during his redshirt sophomore season and was named first-team All-MVFC. As a redshirt junior, he rushed for 707 yards in the spring 2021 season, which was delayed from the fall due to the COVID-19 pandemic. As a redshirt senior, Strong rushed for 1,686 yards and 18 touchdowns, caught 22 passes for 150 yards, and also completed 4-of-4 pass attempts for 62 yards and four touchdowns.

== Professional career ==
Pre-draft measurables
Height	Weight	Arm length	Hand span	Wingspan	40-yard dash	10-yard split	20-yard split	20-yard shuttle	Three-cone drill	Vertical jump	Broad jump	Bench press
5 ft 11 3/8 in (1.81 m)	207 lb (94 kg)	31 7/8 in (0.81 m)	9 1/4 in (0.23 m)	6 ft 3 7/8 in (1.93 m)	4.37 s	1.51 s	2.55 s	4.25 s	6.95 s	38.0 in (0.97 m)	10 ft 4 in (3.15 m)	16 reps
All values from NFL Combine/Pro Day

=== New England Patriots ===
Strong was selected by the New England Patriots with the 127th pick in the fourth round of the 2022 NFL draft. On December 12, 2022, Strong scored a three–yard rushing touchdown for his first career touchdown in a 27–13 victory over the Arizona Cardinals. Strong finished his rookie season with ten carries for 100 yards and one rushing touchdown.

=== Cleveland Browns ===
On August 27, 2023, Strong was traded to the Cleveland Browns in exchange for Tyrone Wheatley Jr. He appeared in all 17 games for Cleveland (including one start), recording 63 rush attempts for 291 yards and one touchdown. In 2024, Strong logged 26 carries for 108 scoreless yards across 14 appearances.

On August 26, 2025, Strong was waived by the Browns with an injury designation as part of final roster cuts.

=== Green Bay Packers ===
On September 8, 2025, Strong was signed to the Green Bay Packers' practice squad. He was elevated to the active roster for Weeks 7 and 15. Strong signed a reserve/future contract with Green Bay on January 12, 2026.

On August 30, 2026, Strong was released by the Packers as a part of final roster cuts. A day later, he was re–signed to the Packers' practice squad. On October 8, Strong was promoted to the active roster. He was released on November 19 and re-signed to the practice squad two days later.
