= Mann Arts and Science Magnet Middle School =

Horace Mann Arts and Science Magnet Middle School

Location
- 1000 E. Roosevelt Rd. 72206; Little Rock, Arkansas; United States; 34°43′29″N 92°15′39″W

Information
- Type: Public
- Motto: Connected Classrooms, Infinite Possibilities
- Established: 1955
- School district: Little Rock School District
- Principal: Dr. Tony Howard
- Teaching staff: 62.09 (FTE)
- Grades: 6-8
- Enrollment: 759 (2018-19)
- Student to teacher ratio: 12.22
- Color
- Mascot: Bearcat
- Website: www.lrsd.org/o/mann

Horace Mann Arts and Sciences Magnet Middle School is a magnet middle school located in Little Rock, Arkansas, United States. It is part of the Little Rock School District. The school was named after educational reformer and Congressman Horace Mann.

== History ==
The school was formerly known as the Horace Mann High School and the Horace Mann Junior High School. It was opened as an all-negro high school in 1955. In 1958 the United States district court declared it to be equal to the school designed for white high school children.

Interior Design Associates won a gold award for design excellence for its renovation of the school that was completed in 2004.

== Notable alumni ==
- Chelsea Clinton
- Richard Mays, politician and judge
- Frank Scott Jr., politician
- Jefferson Thomas, activist
- Melba Pattillo Beals, activist
