= Little Rock School District =

School district in Arkansas, United States

Location
- 810 West Markham Street; Little Rock, Arkansas 72201 United States

District information
- Type: Public (government funded)
- Established: February 16, 1869
- President: Norma Johnson
- Superintendent: Dr. Jermall D. Wright
- Asst. superintendent(s): Dr. Shana Loring Dr. Karen Bradshaw Dr. Amy Cooper
- Accreditation: Arkansas Department of Education (ADE)
- Schools: 47
- NCES District ID: 0509000

Students and staff
- Students: 24,048
- Teachers: 1,609.54 (on FTE basis)
- Student–teacher ratio: 14.02

Other information
- Graduation Seals: ADE Seal; Magnet Program Seal; Arkansas Scholars Seal; Honors Diploma Seal
- High School Courses: ESL; Regular; Honors; Pre-AP; Advanced Placement; International Baccalaureate
- Website: www.lrsd.org

The Little Rock School District is a school district in Little Rock, Arkansas, United States. It is one of four public school districts in Pulaski County and encompasses 97.60 square miles (252.8 km^{2}) of land nearly coterminous with the state's capital and largest city. In addition to most of Little Rock it serves Cammack Village. The district however does not include the Pulaski County section of Alexander, as that is an exclave of the Pulaski County Special School District.

From its establishment in 1869 until 1886 it was known as the School District of Little Rock, and then from that year to 1963 it was known as the Special School District of Little Rock. It took its present name in 1963.

== 2015 State takeover of district ==
In July 2014, the Arkansas State Board of Education classified six of the nearly 50 district schools as being in "academic distress": Baseline Elementary School, Cloverdale Magnet Middle School, Henderson Middle School, Hall High School, J.A. Fair High School, and McClellan Magnet High School.

In October 2014, the Special Committee on Academic Distress met with the Little Rock School District administration. On January 7, 2015, the Little Rock School District administration and School Board provided progress reports to the Special Committee on Academic Distress. On January 8, 2015, the State Board of Education voted to hold a special State Board meeting on January 28.

On January 28, 2015, the State Board of Education met for more than five hours before voting 5–4 to immediately take over the Little Rock School District. As part of the takeover, Superintendent Dexter Suggs was allowed to remain in his position on an interim basis, and the LRSD school board was immediately disbanded.

== LRSD vs. PCSSD (Desegregation) ==
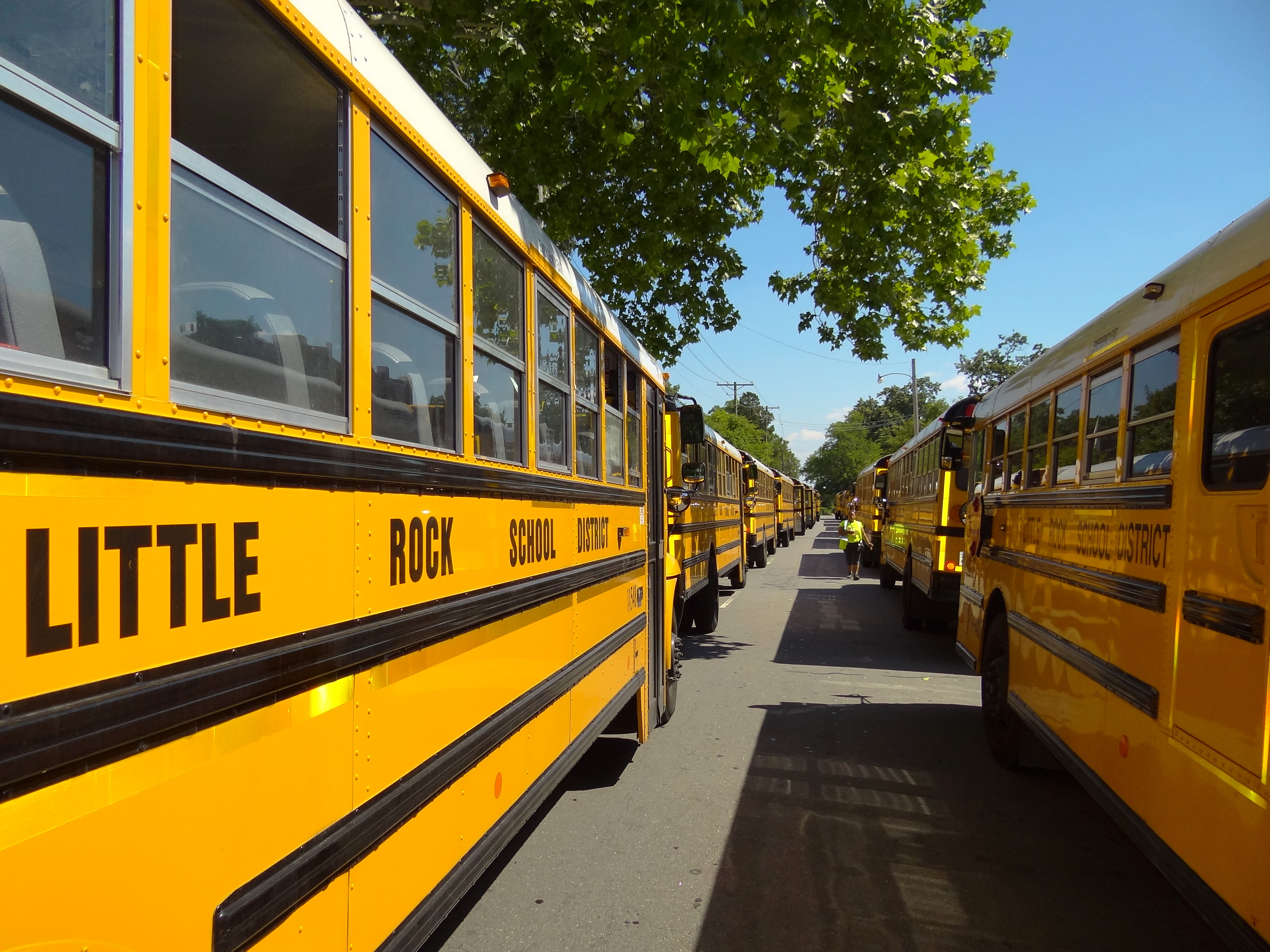
Little Rock School District Buses outside Central High School

The three school districts within the county—Little Rock School District, North Little Rock School District (NLRSD), and Pulaski County Special School District (PCSSD) have been involved in a desegregation case that the courts determined were unconstitutionally segregated and placed under court supervision since 1982. After numerous actions were satisfied, including incorpating those schools within the City of Little Rock boundaries to be unitary with the LRSD. Those actions led to the annexation of J. A. Fair High School from PCSSD to LRSD in 1987. In 2007, the courts determined that all actions by LRSD were completed and that court supervision continues until NLRSD and PCSSD actions are completed.

== Secondary education ==
=== Comprehensive high schools ===
The following high schools offer comprehensive education programs with interscholastic activities (e.g., sports teams). Attendance in zoned schools is based on the student's residence, while inter-district schools are able to select students from within Pulaski County's four public school districts.

- Little Rock Central High School
- Little Rock Southwest High School
- Little Rock West High School
- Hall STEAM Magnet High School (formerly the zoned Hall High School)
- Parkview Arts and Science Magnet High School

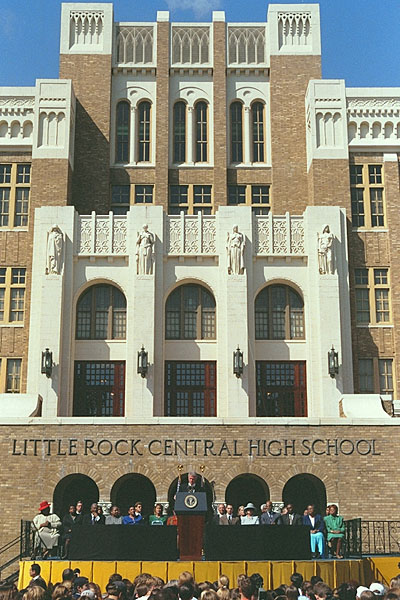
President Bill Clinton led celebrations of the 40th anniversary of desegregation at Little Rock Central High School.

=== Middle schools ===
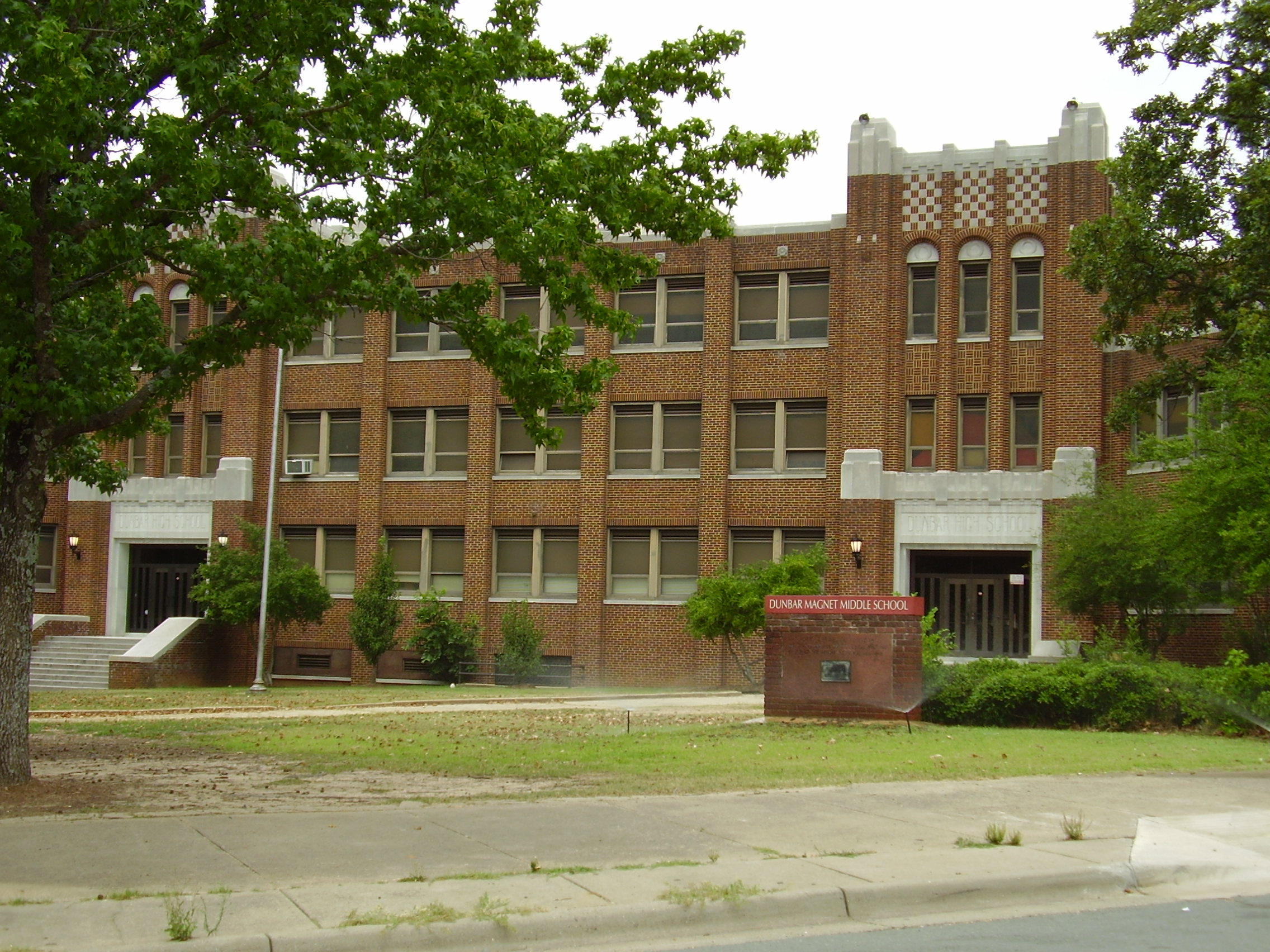
Dunbar Magnet Middle School

School	Mascot	Year Opened	Grades	Enrollment
Dunbar Magnet Middle School	Bobcats	1929	6–8	557
Mabelvale Magnet Middle School	Red Raiders	1967	6–8	600
Mann Arts and Science Magnet Middle School	Bearcats	1955	6–8	762
Pulaski Heights Middle School	Panthers	1931	6–8	592
Pinnacle View Middle School	Sky Hawks	2016	6-8	903
Forest Heights STEM Academy	Eagles	2014	K-8	709

=== Other secondary schools ===
- Adult Education Center
- Accelerated Learning Center (10–12)
- Metropolitan Career-Technical Center (9–12)
- W. D. Hamilton Learning Academy (6–12)
- Felder Academy (6–12)

== Elementary and early childhood education ==
=== Elementary schools ===
- Bale Elementary School (PK–5)
- Carver Basic Skills Math-Science Magnet Elementary School (PK–5)
- Chicot Elementary School (PK–5)
- Don R. Roberts Elementary School (PK–5)
- Fair Park Early Childhood Center (PK)
- Forest Park Elementary School (PK–5)
- Franklin Alternative Environment
- Fulbright Elementary School (PK–5)
- # Gibbs Magnet School of International Studies and Foreign Languages (PK–5)
- Jefferson Elementary School (PK–5)
- Dr. Martin Luther King Jr. Interdistrict Magnet Elementary School (PK–5)
- Mabelvale Elementary School (PK–5)
- McDermott Elementary School (PK–5)
- Otter Creek Elementary School (PK–5)
- Pulaski Heights Elementary School (KG–5)
- # Rockefeller Early Childhood Magnet Elementary School (PK–5)
- Romine Early Childhood Center (PK)
- Stephens Elementary School (PK–5)
- Terry Elementary School (PK–5)
- Wakefield Elementary School (PK–5)
- Washington Basic Skills Math-Science Interdistrict Magnet Elementary School (PK–5)
- Watson Elementary School (K–5)
- Western Hills Elementary School (PK–5)
- Williams Traditional Magnet Elementary School (KG–5)
- Woodruff Early Childhood Center (PK)

Note: while a # denotes a magnet school, all Little Rock School District schools provide a comprehensive elementary education.

==== Rockefeller Early Childhood Magnet Elementary School ====
===== History =====
Rockefeller Elementary opened in 1979. It was named to honor Winthrop Rockefeller (1912–1973), Governor of Arkansas from 1967 to 1971.

Rockefeller was built to replace two existing schools. One of them, the Parham School (built in 1908), was in the construction path of the proposed Interstate 630, so much of the funding for its replacement came from the state highway and transportation departments. The new school was bid at $2.3 million.

With the prospect of a beautiful new school, the Little Rock School District decided also to close the Kramer School on Sherman Street (built in 1895). The Kramer School had gained national attention as the site of the Center for Early Development and Education established by Bettye Caldwell, Professor of Education at the University of Arkansas at Little Rock. The center, often referred to as "The Kramer Project," began in 1969. The decision was made to move the center to the new school.

The Rockefeller Early Childhood Program provides educational experiences and child care for children aged six weeks to three years. It was developed to determine the effects of a high-quality education coupled with an extended-day childcare program on children who were from six months of age through the sixth grade in school. Rockefeller opened to early childhood and intermediate students (grades 4–6) in August 1979 with an enrollment of 563. It became a full elementary school and center for early childhood education in 1987. The school currently serves children ranging in age from 6 weeks through 5th grade.

===== Facilities =====
Rockefeller is an open-space school. It offers specialized work labs, music instruction and performance areas and even separate playground areas with age-appropriate equipment for toddlers, pre-kindergartners and elementary students. Rockefeller was one of six LRSD schools to be designated an "incentive school." The extra funds it receives allows the school to retain a full-time nurse and Early Childhood Coordinator as well as specialists in art, music, physical education, technology and media.

Rockefeller also is one of two schools participating in the Teacher Advancement Program (TAP), an initiative of the Milken Family Foundation to attract, retain, motivate and develop talented teachers. TAP helps teachers become the best they can be by giving them opportunities to learn better teaching strategies and compensates them based on their performance.

The Computer Science theme is evident by 140 computers throughout the school. The music program is outstanding and has two show choirs that have traveled out of state to perform. A certified physical education specialist leads the outstanding physical education program. The science specialist serves students in grades 3–5 in a fully equipped science laboratory.

Rockefeller has a full-time nurse, counselor and social worker.

The outstanding Accelerated Reader Program started at Rockefeller in 1999. Extended Day activities include scouts, art classes, hand bell ringers, primary and intermediate show choirs, Computer Club, Running Club, small group tutoring, Science Club and LOVE Team. Rockefeller also offers an early childhood education program, accepting infants as young as six weeks of age.

===== Extracurricular =====
Rockefeller's renowned Show Choir has performed throughout Arkansas and also New York and Hawaii.

==== Williams Traditional Magnet Elementary School ====
===== History =====
Williams opened in 1958 and received building additions in 1964, 1966, 1986 and 1994. A new classroom wing opened in 2004. Williams became a magnet school in 1982 and expanded to a tri-district magnet school in 1986. Williams' magnet theme stresses the basic educational skills: reading, writing and arithmetic. It is named in honor of three different men, all of whom served on the board of directors of the Little Rock School District: J.E. Williams, a member of the board from 1900 to 1903; Nal Williams, a member of the board from 1904 to 1905; and Robert M. Williams, a member of the board from 1939 to 1945.

== Academies K-8 ==
- Dr. Marian G. Lacey K-8 Academy
- J.A. Fair K-8 Preparatory Academy

== Former schools ==
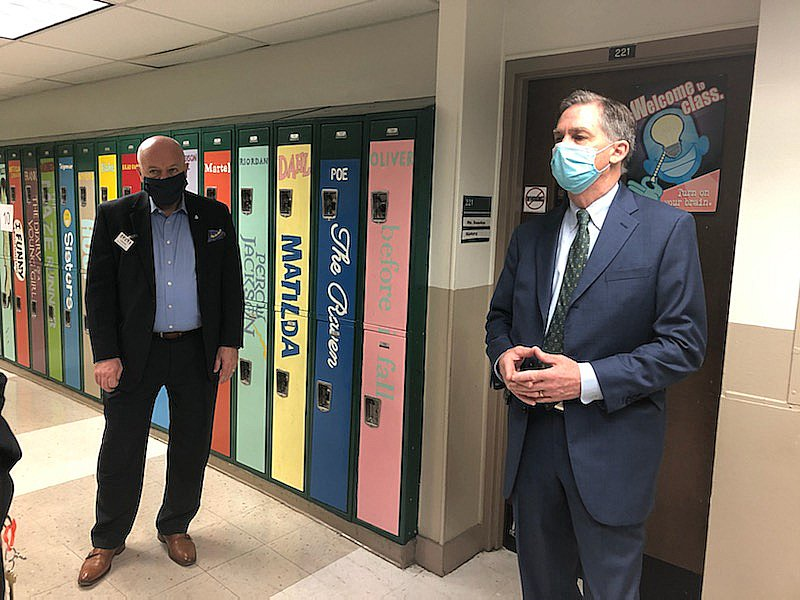
Congressman French Hill visiting Pulaski Heights Middle School in 2020.

=== Former high schools ===
- Paul Laurence Dunbar High School (now Dunbar Magnet Middle School)
- J. A. Fair Systems Magnet High School (Now J.A. Fair Preparatory Academy K-8)
- Horace Mann High School (now Mann Arts and Science Magnet Middle School)
- McClellan Magnet High School (now Dr. Marian G. Lacey K-8 Academy)

=== Former middle schools ===
- Southwest Middle School (Closed at the end of the 2005–2006 school year).
- Forest Heights Middle School (now Forest Heights STEM Academy).
- Henderson Middle School (Closed at the end of the 2020-2021 school year).

=== Former elementary schools ===
- Badgett Elementary School (Closed after the end of the 2001–2002 school year, and was used temporarily to teach Wakefield Elementary, Mitchell Academy, and Cloverdale Elementary students after their campuses closed.)
- Bale Elementary School (Closed at the end of the 2024-2025 school year)
- Cloverdale Elementary School (This school closed in fall of 2005 due to structural problems, and is scheduled for demolition.)
- Garland Elementary School (Closed at the end of the 2000–2001 school year).
- Little Rock Elementary Residential Charter School (Closed at the end of the 2001–2002 school year).
- Mitchell Academy Elementary School (Closed at the end of the 2004–2005 school year).
- Rightsell Academy Elementary School (Closed after the end of the 2005–2006 school year).
- Geyer Springs Elementary School (now Geyer Springs Gifted and Talented Academy).
- David O. Dodd Elementary School (Closed at the end of the 2020-2021 school year).
- Wilson Elementary School (Closed at the end of the 2016-2017 school year).
- Meadowcliff Elementary School (Closed at the end of the 2021-2022 school year, Permanently merged with Baseline Elementary, and Cloverdale Middle at Dr. Marian G. Lacey K-8 Academy Campus).
- Booker Elementary School (Closed at the end of the 2021-2022 school year).
- Baseline Elementary School (Closed at the end of the 2023-2024 school year, Permanently merged with Meadowcliff Elementary, and Cloverdale Middle at Dr. Marian G. Lacey K-8 Academy Campus).
- Brady Elementary School (Closed at the end of the 2024-2025 school year, Students relocated to surrounding LRSD elementary schools).

== Superintendents ==
- N. P. Gates (September 1, 1869 – November 28, 1871)
- Jacob R. Rightsell (November 28, 1871 – 1874; 1884–1905)
- J. B. Bond (acting) (May 1, 1875 – 1876)
- J. M. Fish (1876–1884)
- Burr Walter Torreyson (1905–1909)
- Robert Cleveland Hall (1909–1941)
- R. T. Scobee (1941–1948)
- H. A. Little (1948–1953)
- Ed F. McCuistion (acting) (January 1, 1953 – March 1, 1953)
- Virgil T. Blossom (July 1, 1953 – November 30, 1958)
- Terrell E. Powell (acting) (December 22, 1958 – August 1, 1961)
- Floyd W. Parsons (August 1, 1961 – June 30, 1972)
- Paul R. Fair (July 1, 1972 – January 6, 1978)
- Winston F. Simpson (acting) (January 6, 1978 – August 14, 1978)
- Paul W. Masem (August 1978 – May 1982)
- Ruth S. Steele (acting) (May 1982 – June 1982)
- Edward L. Kelly (June 1982 – June 1987)
- Vance Jones (acting) (July 1, 1987 – October 1987)
- George D. Cannon (interim) (October 1987 – December 1987)
- George D. Cannon (December 23, 1987 – August 5, 1989)
- Ruth S. Steele (July 15, 1989 – June 30, 1992)
- Cloyde McKinley (Mac) Bernd (July 1, 1992 – June 30, 1993)
- Estelle Matthis (interim) (July 1, 1993 – October 1, 1993)
- Henry P. Williams (October 1, 1993 – July 1996)
- Don Roberts (interim) (August 15, 1996 – September 1997)
- Leslie V. Carnine (September 1997 – June 2001)
- T. Kenneth James (June 2001 – June 2003)
- Donald Stewart (interim) (June 2003 – August 2003)
- Morris L. Holmes (interim)(August 2003 – June 2004)
- Roy G. Brooks (July 2004 – August 2007)
- Linda Watson (interim) (August 2007 – June 2008)
- Dexter Suggs (June 2008 – June 2015)
- Baker Kurrus (June 2015 – June 2016)
- Michael Poore (June 2016 – June 2022)
- Jermall D. Wright (July 2022 – Present)
