= North Dakota State Bison football statistical leaders =

The North Dakota State Bison football statistical leaders are individual statistical leaders of the North Dakota State Bison football program in various categories, including passing, rushing, receiving, total offense, defensive stats, kicking, and scoring. Within those areas, the lists identify single-game, single-season, and career leaders. The Bison represent North Dakota State University in the NCAA Division I FBS Mountain West Conference.

Although North Dakota State began competing in intercollegiate football in 1894, the school's official record book considers the "modern era" to have begun in 1949. Records from before this year are often incomplete and inconsistent, and they are generally not included in these lists.

These lists are dominated by more recent players for several reasons:

- Since 1949, seasons have increased from 10 games to 11 and then 12 games in length.
- The NCAA didn't allow freshmen to play varsity football until 1972 (with the exception of the World War II years), allowing players to have four-year careers.
- North Dakota State played in the second level of Division I football, known before 2006 as Division I-AA and since then as Division I FCS, from 2004 to 2025. While regular seasons at that level would not expand to the FBS limit of 12 games until the 2026 season, normally being restricted to 11, two aspects of FCS rules have allowed for more games. Prior to 2004, North Dakota State played Division II football from 1964–2003.
  - The NCAA organizes an FCS championship tournament, currently called the NCAA Division I Football Championship. The NCAA did not count I-AA/FCS playoff games toward official season statistics until 2002 (the same season that it first counted FBS bowl games toward official season statistics), and most programs that played at this level follow this practice.
  - Additionally, pre-2026 NCAA rules allowed FCS teams to schedule 12 regular-season games in years when the period starting with the Thursday before Labor Day and ending with the final Saturday in November contains 14 Saturdays.
- From 2018 through 2025, players in both FBS and FCS were allowed to participate in as many as four games in a redshirt season; previously, playing in even one game "burned" the redshirt. In 2024 and 2025, postseason games did not count against the four-game limit. These changes to redshirt rules have given very recent players several extra games to accumulate statistics.
- A more recent change that will have a major effect on future career leaderboards was introduced in 2026 with full implementation starting with the 2027 freshman class. Going forward, redshirting will be prohibited, but players will have five years of full athletic eligibility, provided that they are no older than 19 when they first enroll in a postsecondary institution. Players who had remaining eligibility under previous rules at the end of the 2025 season will benefit from the new rule.
- Due to COVID-19 issues, the NCAA ruled that the 2020 season would not count against the athletic eligibility of any football player, giving everyone who played in that season the opportunity for five years of eligibility instead of the normal four.

These lists are updated through Week 0 of the 2026 season.

== Passing ==
=== Passing yards ===
Career
Rk	Player	Yards	Years
1	Cam Miller	9721	2020 2021 2022 2023 2024
2	Easton Stick	8693	2015 2016 2017 2018
3	Brock Jensen	8598	2010 2011 2012 2013
4	Steve Walker	7033	2004 2005 2006 2007
5	Carson Wentz	5115	2012 2013 2014 2015
6	Kevin Feeney	4757	1995 1996 1997 1998
7	Ryan Johnson	3806	1997 1998 1999 2000
8	Mark Speral	3721	1977 1978 1979 1980
9	Graig Gorder	3564	1998 1999 2000 2001 2002
10	Nick Mertens	3496	2006 2007 2008 2009

Single season
Rk	Player	Yards	Year
1	Cam Miller	3251	2024
2	Carson Wentz	3111	2014
3	Brock Jensen	2793	2013
4	Trey Lance	2786	2019
5	Easton Stick	2752	2018
6	Cole Payton	2719	2025
7	Cam Miller	2688	2023
8	Brock Jensen	2524	2011
9	Easton Stick	2466	2017
10	Brock Jensen	2331	2012
	Easton Stick	2331	2016

Single game
Rk	Player	Yards	Year	Opponent
1	Steve Walker	451	2006	Ball State
2	Graig Gorder	416	2002	Nebraska-Omaha
3	Cole Payton	348	2025	SE Missouri State
4	Steve Walker	342	2007	Cal Poly
5	Ryan Johnson	341	1999	Northern Colorado
6	Carson Wentz	335	2015	Northern Iowa
7	Brian Owen	324	1988	Northern Colorado
8	Tony Stauss	317	2003	Concordia-St. Paul
9	Brock Jensen	313	2013	Missouri State
	Trey Lance	313	2019	Western Illinois

=== Passing touchdowns ===
Career
Rk	Player	TDs	Years
1	Easton Stick	88	2015 2016 2017 2018
2	Cam Miller	81	2020 2021 2022 2023 2024
3	Brock Jensen	72	2010 2011 2012 2013
4	Steve Walker	60	2004 2005 2006 2007
5	Carson Wentz	45	2012 2013 2014 2015
6	Kevin Feeney	37	1995 1996 1997 1998
7	Ryan Johnson	31	1997 1998 1999 2000
8	Trey Lance	30	2018 2019 2020
9	Terry Hanson	27	1965 1966 1967
10	Tony Stauss	26	2003 2004
	Nick Mertens	26	2006 2007 2008 2009

Single season
Rk	Player	TDs	Year
1	Brock Jensen	34	2013
2	Cam Miller	33	2024
3	Trey Lance	28	2019
	Easton Stick	28	2018
	Easton Stick	28	2017
6	Carson Wentz	25	2014
7	Steve Walker	20	2007
8	Easton Stick	19	2016
	Cam Miller	19	2023
10	Ryan Johnson	18	1999

Single game
Rk	Player	TDs	Year	Opponent
1	Carson Wentz	5	2014	Missouri State
	Easton Stick	5	2018	Missouri State
	Steve Walker	5	2007	Sam Houston State
	Tony Stauss	5	2003	South Dakota
5	Brock Jensen	4	2013	Youngstown State
	Brock Jensen	4	2013	Indiana State
	Cam Miller	4	2024	Missouri State
	Carson Wentz	4	2015	Northern Iowa
	Carson Wentz	4	2015	North Dakota
	Chris Simdorn	4	1990	St. Cloud State
	Cole Payton	4	2025	SE Missouri State
	Don Siverson	4	1972	Northern Iowa
	Easton Stick	4	2017	Sam Houston State
	Easton Stick	4	2015	Western Illinois
	Easton Stick	4	2015	Missouri State
	Easton Stick	4	2018	Northern Iowa
	Easton Stick	4	2017	Indiana State
	Graig Gorder	4	2002	Nebraska-Omaha
	Kevin Feeney	4	1997	Morningside
	Rob Hyland	4	1993	St. Cloud State
	Trey Lance	4	2019	Butler

== Rushing ==
=== Rushing yards ===
Career
Rk	Player	Yards	Years
1	Lamar Gordon	4696	1998 1999 2000 2001
2	John Crockett	4309	2012 2013 2014
3	Kyle Steffes	3952	2003 2004 2005 2006
4	Sam Ojuri	3694	2009 2011 2012 2013
5	Jake Morris	3688	1994 1995 1996 1997
6	Chris Simdorn	3313	1987 1988 1989 1990
7	Tony Satter	3212	1987 1988 1989 1990
8	Lance Dunn	3028	2015 2016 2017 2018
9	DJ McNorton	2985	2008 2009 2010 2011
10	Jeff Bentrim	2945	1983 1984 1985 1986

Single season
Rk	Player	Yards	Year
1	John Crockett	1994	2014
2	Lamar Gordon	1723	2000
3	Jake Morris	1710	1997
4	DJ McNorton	1559	2010
5	Lamar Gordon	1495	1999
6	Tyler Roehl	1431	2007
7	Sam Ojuri	1398	2013
8	Pat Paschall	1397	2009
9	John Crockett	1277	2013
10	Rod Malone	1251	2003

Single game
Rk	Player	Yards	Year	Opponent
1	Tyler Roehl	263	2007	Minnesota
2	Lamar Gordon	260	2000	South Dakota
3	Tyler Roehl	257	2007	Illinois State
4	Jake Morris	251	1997	South Dakota State
5	DJ McNorton	250	2010	South Dakota
6	Jake Morris	246	1997	Minn. St. Mankato
7	Doug Lloyd	239	1988	South Dakota
8	Tyler Roehl	238	2007	Stephen F. Austin
9	Tyler Roehl	229	2008	Illinois State
10	John Crockett	227	2014	Coastal Carolina

=== Rushing touchdowns ===
Career
Rk	Player	TDs	Years
1	Jeff Bentrim	64	1983 1984 1985 1986
2	Lamar Gordon	62	1998 1999 2000 2001
3	Chris Simdorn	53	1987 1988 1989 1990
4	Cam Miller	48	2020 2021 2022 2023 2024
	Kevin Feeney	48	1995 1996 1997 1998
6	Kyle Steffes	43	2003 2004 2005 2006
7	Easton Stick	41	2015 2016 2017 2018
	John Crockett	41	2012 2013 2014
9	Mark Speral	38	1977 1978 1979 1980
10	Sam Ojuri	35	2009 2011 2012 2013
	Paul Hatchett	35	1967 1968 1969
	Brock Jensen	35	2010 2011 2012 2013
	Tyler Roehl	35	2004 2006 2007 2008

Single season
Rk	Player	TDs	Year
1	Jeff Bentrim	23	1986
2	Lamar Gordon	22	2000
	Lamar Gordon	22	1999
4	Tyler Roehl	21	2007
	John Crockett	21	2014
6	Kevin Feeney	20	1996
	Barika Kpeenu	20	2025
8	Chris Simdorn	18	1988
	Jeff Bentrim	18	1985
10	Chris Simdorn	17	1990
	Rod Malone	17	2003
	Easton Stick	17	2018
	Paul Hatchett	17	1968

Single game
Rk	Player	TDs	Year	Opponent
1	Cam Miller	5	2022	North Dakota
	Kevin Feeney	5	1996	Minn. St. Mankato
	Mark Speral	5	1977	North Dakota
	Paul Hatchett	5	1968	Minn. St. Mankato
	Paul Hatchett	5	1969	Nebraska-Omaha
6	Brian Owen	4	1987	North Dakota
	Chris Simdorn	4	1988	Morningside
	Cole Payton	4	2025	South Dakota State
	DJ McNorton	4	2010	Montana State
	Don Fougner	4	1953	Augustana (S.D.)
	Jeff Bentrim	4	1985	Northern Colorado
	Jeff Bentrim	4	1985	Cal Poly
	Ken Rota	4	1965	Wisconsin-Milwaukee
	Kevin Feeney	4	1996	South Dakota
	Kevin Feeney	4	1995	Minn. St. Mankato
	Kyle Steffes	4	2004	Valparaiso
	Lamar Gordon	4	1999	Ferris State
	Lamar Gordon	4	2000	South Dakota
	Lance Dunn	4	2018	Montana State
	Pat Paschall	4	2009	Indiana State
	Paul Hatchett	4	1968	Augustana (S.D.)
	Rob Hyland	4	1994	South Dakota State
	Rod Malone	4	2003	Augustana (S.D.)
	Tony Satter	4	1988	South Dakota State
	Tyler Roehl	4	2007	Illinois State
	Wayne Stevenson	4	1970	Minn. St. Mankato

== Receiving ==
=== Receptions ===
Career
Rk	Player	Rec	Years
1	Zach Vraa	195	2011 2012 2013 2014 2015
2	Darrius Shepherd	188	2015 2016 2017 2018
3	Kole Heckendorf	178	2005 2006 2007 2008
4	Travis White	163	2002 2003 2004 2006
5	Warren Holloway	161	2008 2009 2010 2011
6	RJ Urzendowski	149	2014 2015 2016 2017
7	Ryan Smith	147	2010 2011 2012 2013
8	TR McDonald	134	1990 1991 1992 1993
9	Bryce Lance	127	2021 2022 2023 2024 2025
10	Tim Strehlow	121	1996 1997 1998 1999

Single season
Rk	Player	Rec	Year
1	Warren Holloway	77	2011
2	Bryce Lance	75	2024
3	TR McDonald	69	1993
4	Zach Vraa	67	2013
5	Darrius Shepherd	62	2018
6	Travis White	57	2004
7	Allen Burrell	56	2003
8	Ryan Smith	54	2013
9	Kole Heckendorf	52	2006
10	Bryce Lance	51	2025

Single game
Rk	Player	Rec	Year	Opponent
1	Charles Wiest	13	2001	Minn. State Mankato
	Chuck Wald	13	1968	Northern Illinois
3	TR McDonald	11	1993	South Dakota State
	TR McDonald	11	1993	St. Cloud State
5	Lowell Linderman	10	1966	St. Thomas (Minn.)
	Travis White	10	2004	Northern Colorado
	Jackson Williams	10	2026	UTEP
8	Bryce Lance	9	2024	Montana State
	Chuck Wald	9	1969	Morningside
	Kole Heckendorf	9	2008	Youngstown State
	Mike McTague	9	1978	Nebraska-Omaha
	Mike Wieser	9	2003	St. Cloud State
	Steve Sponberg	9	1980	Morningside

=== Receiving yards ===
Career
Rk	Player	Yards	Years
1	Zach Vraa	2957	2011 2012 2013 2014 2015
2	Darrius Shepherd	2841	2015 2016 2017 2018
3	Kole Heckendorf	2732	2005 2006 2007 2008
4	TR McDonald	2544	1990 1991 1992 1993
5	RJ Urzendowski	2435	2014 2015 2016 2017
6	Tim Strehlow	2332	1996 1997 1998 1999
7	Warren Holloway	2232	2008 2009 2010 2011
8	Bryce Lance	2157	2021 2022 2023 2024 2025
9	Christian Watson	2140	2018 2019 2020 2021
10	Len Kretchman	1915	1985 1986 1987 1988

Single season
Rk	Player	Yards	Year
1	Zach Vraa	1191	2013
2	TR McDonald	1181	1993
3	Bryce Lance	1079	2025
4	Bryce Lance	1071	2024
5	Darrius Shepherd	1065	2018
6	Warren Holloway	1003	2011
7	Eli Green	877	2023
8	Tim Strehlow	828	1999
9	Christian Watson	801	2021
10	Travis White	776	2004

Single game
Rk	Player	Yards	Year	Opponent
1	Len Kretchman	232	1988	Northern Colorado
2	TR McDonald	206	1993	St. Cloud State
3	Tim Strehlow	206	1999	Northern Colorado
4	TR McDonald	188	1993	South Dakota
5	Warren Holloway	184	2010	Western Illinois
6	Stacy Robinson	183	1983	Augustana (S.D.)
7	Marques Johnson	180	2002	Nebraska-Omaha
8	Kole Heckendorf	179	2008	Austin Peay
	Zach Vraa	179	2013	Missouri State
10	TR McDonald	171	1993	South Dakota State

=== Receiving touchdowns ===
Career
Rk	Player	TDs	Years
1	Zach Vraa	28	2011 2012 2013 2014 2015
2	Tim Strehlow	26	1996 1997 1998 1999
3	Bryce Lance	25	2021 2022 2023 2024 2025
4	Len Kretchman	24	1985 1986 1987 1988
5	TR McDonald	22	1990 1991 1992 1993
	RJ Urzendowski	22	2014 2015 2016 2017
7	Darrius Shepherd	20	2015 2016 2017 2018
8	Eric Nelson	18	1997 1998 1999 2000
9	Kole Heckendorf	17	2005 2006 2007 2008
10	Ben Ellefson	16	2016 2017 2018 2019

Single season
Rk	Player	TDs	Year
1	Bryce Lance	17	2024
2	Zach Vraa	15	2013
3	TR McDonald	11	1993
4	Tim Strehlow	9	1999
	Darrius Shepherd	9	2018
	Travis White	9	2004
7	Stacy Robinson	8	1984
	Tim Strehlow	8	1997
	Kevin Vaadeland	8	2013
	Warren Holloway	8	2011
	Bryce Lance	8	2025
	Len Kretchman	8	1987
	Ben Ellefson	8	2018
	RJ Urzendowski	8	2017

Single game
Rk	Player	TDs	Year	Opponent
1	TR McDonald	4	1993	St. Cloud State
2	Bryce Lance	3	2024	South Dakota State
	Bryce Lance	3	2024	Murray State
	Kole Heckendorf	3	2008	Austin Peay
	Len Kretchman	3	1988	Northern Colorado
	Mike Puestow	3	1973	Minn. St. Mankato
	Tim Strehlow	3	1997	Texas A&M-Commerce
8	A. J. Cooper	2	2005	Northwestern State
	Allen Burrell	2	2003	North Dakota
	Allen Burrell	2	2004	Montana Tech
	Andy DelaBarre	2	2005	Arkansas-Monticello
	Ben Ellefson	2	2018	Missouri State
	Ben Ellefson	2	2018	South Dakota
	Bruce Anderson	2	2017	Sam Houston State
	Bryce Lance	2	2024	Mercer
	Bryce Lance	2	2025	St. Thomas (MN)
	Bryce Lance	2	2024	Tennessee State
	Chase Morlock	2	2016	San Diego
	Chase Morlock	2	2015	Weber State
	Connor Wentz	2	2014	Missouri State
	Connor Wentz	2	2017	Indiana State
	Darrius Shepherd	2	2018	Eastern Washington
	Darrius Shepherd	2	2018	Northern Iowa
	Darrius Shepherd	2	2015	Northern Iowa
	Elliott Belquist	2	2003	South Dakota
	Elliott Belquist	2	2002	Nebraska-Omaha
	Eric Nelson	2	2000	St. Cloud State
	Garrett Bruhn	2	2012	South Dakota State
	Hunter Luepke	2	2021	James Madison
	Jerimiah Wurzbacher	2	2006	Cal Poly
	Jerimiah Wurzbacher	2	2008	Central Conn. State
	Joe Stoffel	2	2024	Missouri State
	Joe Stoffel	2	2023	Eastern Washington
	Josh Babicz	2	2019	Butler
	Josh Babicz	2	2019	Youngstown State
	Kevin Vaadeland	2	2013	Youngstown State
	Kole Heckendorf	2	2007	Illinois State
	Kole Heckendorf	2	2007	Sam Houston State
	Noah Gindorff	2	2020	Eastern Washington
	RJ Urzendowski	2	2014	South Dakota State
	RJ Urzendowski	2	2015	Southern Illinois
	RJ Urzendowski	2	2017	Miss. Valley State
	RJ Urzendowski	2	2015	North Dakota
	RaJa Nelson	2	2024	South Dakota State
	RaJa Nelson	2	2025	SE Missouri State
	Tim Strehlow	2	1998	Morningside
	Tim Strehlow	2	1999	Minn. State Moorhead
	Tim Strehlow	2	1998	Nebraska Omaha
	Travis White	2	2006	Concordia-St. Paul
	Travis White	2	2004	Weber State
	Travis White	2	2004	Carson-Newman
	Warren Holloway	2	2011	Missouri State
	Warren Holloway	2	2011	Lafayette
	Warren Holloway	2	2010	Morgan State
	Zach Mathis	2	2023	South Dakota State
	Zach Mathis	2	2023	Missouri State
	Zach Vraa	2	2013	Illinois State
	Zach Vraa	2	2013	Missouri State
	Zach Vraa	2	2014	Indiana State
	Zach Vraa	2	2013	Indiana State
	Zach Vraa	2	2012	Prairie View A&M

== Total offense ==
Total offense is the sum of passing and rushing statistics. It does not include receiving or returns.

=== Total offense yards ===
Career
Rk	Player	Yards	Years
1	Cam Miller	11998	2020 2021 2022 2023 2024
2	Easton Stick	11216	2015 2016 2017 2018
3	Brock Jensen	9838	2010 2011 2012 2013
4	Kevin Feeney	7230	1995 1996 1997 1998
5	Steve Walker	7144	2004 2005 2006 2007
6	Jeff Bentrim	6345	1983 1984 1985 1986
7	Carson Wentz	6143	2012 2013 2014 2015
8	Mark Speral	5985	1977 1978 1979 1980
9	Chris Simdorn	5202	1987 1988 1989 1990
10	Cole Payton	5106	2021 2022 2023 2024 2025

Single season
Rk	Player	Yards	Year
1	Trey Lance	3886	2019
2	Cam Miller	3882	2024
3	Carson Wentz	3753	2014
4	Cole Payton	3496	2025
5	Easton Stick	3429	2018
6	Cam Miller	3317	2023
7	Brock Jensen	3272	2013
8	Easton Stick	3129	2017
9	Easton Stick	3016	2016
10	Brock Jensen	2697	2011

Single game
Rk	Player	Yards	Year	Opponent
1	Graig Gorder	466	2002	Nebraska-Omaha
2	Steve Walker	455	2006	Ball State
3	Cole Payton	401	2025	SE Missouri State
4	Carson Wentz	382	2015	Northern Iowa
5	Cole Payton	380	2025	South Dakota State
6	Cole Payton	375	2025	South Dakota
7	Mike Bentson	373	1971	Northern Arizona
8	Brian Owen	359	1988	Northern Colorado
9	Cam Miller	358	2024	Colorado
10	Trey Lance	355	2019	Western Illinois

=== Touchdowns responsible for ===
Career
Rk	Player	TDs	Years
1	Cam Miller	129	2020 2021 2022 2023 2024
	Easton Stick	129	2015 2016 2017 2018
3	Brock Jensen	107	2010 2011 2012 2013
4	Jeff Bentrim	88	1983 1984 1985 1986
5	Kevin Feeney	85	1995 1996 1997 1998
6	Chris Simdorn	72	1987 1988 1989 1990
7	Steve Walker	65	2004 2005 2006 2007
8	Lamar Gordon	64	1998 1999 2000 2001
9	Mark Speral	61	1977 1978 1979 1980
10	Carson Wentz	59	2012 2013 2014 2015

Single season
Rk	Player	TDs	Year
1	Easton Stick	45	2018
	Cam Miller	45	2024
3	Brock Jensen	44	2013
4	Trey Lance	42	2019
5	Easton Stick	40	2017
6	Cam Miller	32	2023
	Jeff Bentrim	32	1986
	Carson Wentz	32	2014
9	Cole Payton	29	2025
	Brock Jensen	29	2012

== Defense ==
=== Interceptions ===
Career
Rk	Player	Ints	Years
1	Marcus Williams	21	2010 2011 2012 2013
2	Robbie Grimsley	17	2015 2016 2017 2018
3	Steve Krumrei	16	1967 1968 1969
	Tre Dempsey	16	2014 2015 2016 2017
5	James Hendricks	14	2016 2017 2018 2019
6	Nick Schommer	13	2005 2006 2007 2008
	Christian Dudzik	13	2011 2012 2013 2014
	Wayne Schluchter	13	1978 1979 1980 1981
9	Matt Gorman	12	2001 2002 2003 2004
	Tom Van Voorhis	12	1981 1982 1983 1984 1985
	Matt Swanson	12	1997 1998 1999 2000
	Mikel Kallenbach	12	1994 1995 1996 1997

Single season
Rk	Player	Ints	Year
1	Cole Wisniewski	8	2023
	Frank Esposito	8	1953
3	Marcus Williams	7	2011
	Marcus Williams	7	2012
	Michael Tutsie	7	2019
	Steve Krumrei	7	1969
	Wayne Schluchter	7	1981
8	Tre Dempsey	6	2017
	Tom Shockman	6	1982
	Greg Gaughran	6	1979
	Steve Krumrei	6	1968
	Rudy Baranko	6	1965
	Robbie Grimsley	6	2018
	Mikel Kallenbach	6	1995
	Christian Dudzik	6	2013
	Tre Dempsey	6	2016
	Kevin Krebsbach	6	1976

Single game
Rk	Player	Ints	Year	Opponent
1	Frank Esposito	4	1953	Northern Iowa
2	Aaron Skyberg	3	1998	Minn. St. Mankato
	Doug Linden	3	1973	Northern Iowa
	George Kallenbach	3	1966	San Diego State
	Keith Krebsbach	3	1972	South Dakota State
	Lorren Henke	3	1972	Northern Iowa
	Matt Swanson	3	1997	Minn. St. Mankato
	Nate Keller	3	2001	Western State
	Rudy Baranko	3	1964	Wisconsin-Milwaukee
	Tom Van Voorhis	3	1983	South Dakota State
	Wayne Schluchter	3	1981	Northern Colorado

=== Tackles ===
Career
Rk	Player	Tackles	Years
1	Jim Dick	412	1982 1983 1984 1985 1986
2	Rick Budde	403	1973 1974 1975 1976
3	Sean Fredricks	380	1994 1995 1996 1997
4	Carlton Littlejohn	345	2011 2012 2013 2014
5	Steve Nelson	338	1971 1972 1973
	Michael Tutsie	338	2018 2019 2020 2021 2022
7	Todd Lecy	337	1978 1979 1980 1981
8	Colten Heagle	336	2010 2011 2012 2013 2014
9	Nick DeLuca	329	2013 2014 2015 2016 2017
10	Grant Olson	326	2010 2011 2012 2013

Single season
Rk	Player	Tackles	Year
1	Jim Dick	167	1985
2	Rick Budde	150	1974
3	Grant Olson	148	2012
4	Rick Budde	147	1975
5	Kim Garvey	140	1974
6	Todd Lecy	137	1981
7	Jerry Rosburg	136	1977
8	Nick DeLuca	135	2015
	Ken Clark	135	1989
10	Steve Nelson	129	1973

Single game
Rk	Player	Tackles	Year	Opponent
1	Grant Olson	29	2012	Wofford
2	Ken Clark	26	1989	Nebraska-Omaha
3	Jim Dick	24	1985	Minn. St. Mankato
	Rick Budde	24	1975	South Dakota State
	Russ Shroyer	24	1978	Nebraska-Omaha
	Steve Armstrong	24	1971	South Dakota State
7	Jerry Rosburg	23	1975	Minn. St. Mankato
	Jim Dick	23	1985	Cal Poly
	Mark Eidem	23	1980	Nebraska-Omaha
	Paul Schaffner	23	1989	South Dakota
	Sean Fredricks	23	1997	South Dakota
	Sean Fredricks	23	1996	Augustana (S.D.)

=== Sacks ===
Career
Rk	Player	Sacks	Years
1	Kyle Emanuel	35.5	2011 2012 2013 2014
	Jerry Dahl	35.5	1973 1974
3	Phil Hansen	35.0	1987 1988 1989 1990
4	Greg Menard	33.5	2014 2015 2016 2018
5	Derrek Tuszka	29.5	2016 2017 2018 2019
6	Coulter Boyer	27.5	2008 2009 2010 2011
7	Cole Jirik	26.0	2010 2011 2012 2013
8	Mike Stratton	22.5	1980 1981 1982 1983
9	Spencer Waege	20.5	2018 2019 2020 2021 2022
	Leif Murphy	20.5	1999 2000 2001 2002

Single season
Rk	Player	Sacks	Year
1	Jerry Dahl	27.0	1974
2	Kyle Emanuel	19.5	2014
3	Phil Hansen	14.0	1989
4	Derrek Tuszka	13.5	2019
5	Leif Murphy	11.0	2001
	Mike Stratton	11.0	1981
	Greg Menard	11.0	2016
8	Phil Hansen	10.5	1990
9	Greg Menard	10.0	2015
	Don Meyer	10.0	1976

Single game
Rk	Player	Sacks	Year	Opponent
1	Jerry Dahl	6.5	1974	South Dakota State
2	Jerry Dahl	5.0	1974	Morningside
3	Kyle Emanuel	4.0	2014	South Dakota State
	Steve Hansen	4.0	1993	Minn. State Mankato
5	Chad Pundsack	3.5	1994	Angelo State
	Don Meyer	3.5	1976	Morningside
	Eli Mostaert	3.5	2021	Illinois State
	Jerry Dahl	3.5	1974	Augustana (S.D.)
9	Cole Jirik	3.0	2012	Illinois State
	Coulter Boyer	3.0	2009	Western Illinois
	Dana Muehlhauser	3.0	1984	Northern Colorado
	Greg Scarborough	3.0	1977	Northern Colorado
	Kyle Emanuel	3.0	2014	Weber State
	Spencer Waege	3.0	2020	Missouri State
	Tom Kovach	3.0	1979	Augustana (S.D.)
	Tom Krenz	3.0	1998	South Dakota

== Kicking ==
=== Field goals made ===
Career
Rk	Player	FGs	Years
1	Adam Keller	56	2011 2012 2013 2014
2	Griffin Crosa	54	2019 2020 2021 2022 2023 2024
3	Shawn Bibeau	51	2006 2007 2008 2009
4	Cam Pedersen	46	2015 2016 2017 2018
5	Aaron Pederson	42	1998 1999 2000 2001
6	Ryan Jastram	31	2009 2010 2011
7	Cory Vartanian	29	2002 2003 2004 2005
8	Ken Kubisz	25	1983 1984 1985 1986
9	Mike McTague	23	1978 1979 1980 1981
10	Jake Reinholz	22	2018 2019 2020 2021

Single season
Rk	Player	FGs	Year
1	Adam Keller	29	2014
2	Griffin Crosa	19	2023
3	Adam Keller	18	2012
4	Eli Ozick	16	2025
	Ryan Jastram	16	2011
	Jake Reinholz	16	2021
	Shawn Bibeau	16	2006
8	Shawn Bibeau	15	2008
	Cam Pedersen	15	2016
10	Shawn Bibeau	14	2007
	Ryan Jastram	14	2010

Single game
Rk	Player	FGs	Year	Opponent
1	Adam Keller	5	2014	Montana
2	Drew Klein	4	2026	Jacksonville State
	Adam Keller	4	2014	South Dakota
	Adam Keller	4	2012	Northern Iowa
	Ken Kubisz	4	1983	Augustana (S.D.)
6	Aaron Pederson	3	1998	Emporia State
	Aaron Pederson	3	1998	Augustana (S.D.)
	Aaron Pederson	3	1998	Texas A&M Kingsville
	Aaron Pederson	3	2000	North Dakota
	Adam Keller	3	2014	Illinois State
	Adam Keller	3	2014	South Dakota State
	Cam Pedersen	3	2015	Jacksonville State
	Cory Vartanian	3	2002	Minn. State Mankato
	Eli Ozick	3	2025	North Dakota
	Griffin Crosa	3	2024	Abilene Christian
	Griffin Crosa	3	2019	Illinois State
	Griffin Crosa	3	2023	Montana
	Griffin Crosa	3	2023	Maine
	Jake Reinholz	3	2021	North Dakota
	Ken Kubisz	3	1986	Northern Michigan
	Mike McTague	3	1978	Northern Arizona
	Ryan Jastram	3	2010	Western Illinois
	Ryan Jastram	3	2011	Missouri State
	Shawn Bibeau	3	2007	Cal Poly
	Shawn Bibeau	3	2006	Minnesota
	Shawn Bibeau	3	2006	Northeastern
	Shawn Bibeau	3	2007	Central Michigan
	Shawn Bibeau	3	2006	Ball State

=== Field goal percentage ===
Career (minimum 25 attempts)
Rk	Player	FG%	Years
1	Griffin Crosa	84.4%	2019 2020 2021 2022 2023 2024
2	Adam Keller	80.0%	2011 2012 2013 2014
3	Jake Reinholz	75.9%	2018 2019 2020 2021
4	Shawn Bibeau	69.9%	2006 2007 2008 2009
5	Mark Luedtke	69.2%	1981 1982 1983
6	Ryan Jastram	68.9%	2009 2010 2011
7	Aaron Pederson	66.7%	1998 1999 2000 2001
8	Cam Pedersen	61.3%	2015 2016 2017 2018
9	Ken Kubisz	61.0%	1983 1984 1985 1986
10	Mike McTague	54.8%	1978 1979 1980 1981

Single season (minimum 5 attempts)
Rk	Player	FG%	Year
1	Griffin Crosa	90.9%	2022
2	Eli Ozick	88.9%	2025
	Ryan Jastram	88.9%	2011
4	Griffin Crosa	86.4%	2023
5	Griffin Crosa	85.7%	2024
6	Adam Keller	85.3%	2014
7	Mark Luedtke	78.6%	1982
8	Aaron Pederson	76.5%	1999
9	Jake Reinholz	76.2%	2021
10	Adam Keller	75.0%	2012

== Scoring ==
=== Points ===
Career
Rk	Player	Pts	Years
1	Griffin Crosa	354	2019 2020 2021 2022 2023 2024
2	Cam Pedersen	399	2015 2016 2017 2018
3	Jeff Bentrim	386	1983 1984 1985 1986
4	Lamar Gordon	384	1998 1999 2000 2001
5	Adam Keller	359	2011 2012 2013 2014
6	Chris Simdorn	318	1987 1988 1989 1990
7	Shawn Bibeau	308	2006 2007 2008 2009
8	Aaron Pederson	304	1998 1999 2000 2001
9	Kevin Feeney	294	1995 1996 1997 1998
10	Cam Miller	290	2020 2021 2022 2023 2024

Single season
Rk	Player	Pts	Year
1	Adam Keller	145	2014
2	Jeff Bentrim	138	1986
2	Lamar Gordon	138	2000
4	Lamar Gordon	132	1999
4	John Crockett	132	2014
6	Griffin Krosa	127	2023
7	Tyler Roehl	126	2007
7	Barika Kpeenu	126	2025
9	Kevin Feeney	120	1996
10	Paul Hatchett	114	1968
10	DJ McNorton	114	2010

Single game
Rk	Player	Pts	Year	Opponent
1	Paul Hatchett	30	1968	Mankato State (Note: Now known athletically as Minnesota State.)
1	Paul Hatchett	30	1969	Nebraska–Omaha (Note: Now known athletically as Omaha, and no longer sponsors football.)
1	Mark Speral	30	1977	North Dakota
1	Tony Satter	30	1988	South Dakota State
1	Kevin Feeney	30	1996	Mankato State
1	Bruce Anderson	30	2017	Sam Houston State (Note: Now known athletically as Sam Houston.)
1	Cam Miller	30	2022	North Dakota
8	Jeff Bentrim	28	1985	Cal Poly
9	10 times by 8 players	24	Most recent: Cole Payton, 2025 vs. South Dakota State	

=== Touchdowns ===
Unlike "touchdowns responsible for", which combines rushing and passing touchdowns only, this reflects touchdowns scored. It excludes passing touchdowns, but includes rushing, receiving, and return touchdowns.

Career
Rk	Player	TDs	Years
1	Jeff Bentrim	64	1983 1984 1985 1986
2	Lamar Gordon	64	1998 1999 2000 2001
3	Chris Simdorn	53	1987 1988 1989 1990
4	Kevin Feeney	48	1995 1996 1997 1998
4	Cam Miller	48	2020 2021 2022 2023 2024
6	Kyle Steffes	43	2003 2004 2005 2006
7	John Crockett	42	2012 2013 2014
8	Paul Hatchett	41	1967 1968 1969
8	DJ McNorton	41	2008 2009 2010 2011
8	Easton Stick	41	2015 2016 2017 2018

Single season
Rk	Player	TDs	Year
1	Jeff Bentrim	23	1986
1	Lamar Gordon	23	2000
3	Lamar Gordon	22	1999
3	John Crockett	22	2014
5	Tyler Roehl	21	2007
5	Barika Kpeenu	21	2025
7	Kevin Feeney	20	1996
8	Paul Hatchett	19	1968
8	DJ McNorton	19	2010
10	Paul Hatchett	18	1969
10	Jeff Bentrim	18	1985
10	Chris Simdorn	18	1988
10	Rod Malone	18	2003
10	Bryce Lance	18	2024

Single game
Rk	Player	TDs	Year	Opponent
1	Paul Hatchett	5	1968	Mankato State (Note: Now known athletically as Minnesota State.)
1	Paul Hatchett	5	1969	Nebraska–Omaha (Note: Now known athletically as Omaha, and no longer sponsors football.)
1	Mark Speral	5	1977	North Dakota
1	Tony Satter	5	1988	South Dakota State
1	Kevin Feeney	5	1996	Mankato State
1	Bruce Anderson	5	2017	Sam Houston State (Note: Now known athletically as Sam Houston.)
1	Cam Miller	5	2022	North Dakota
8	21 times by 18 players	4	Most recent: Cole Payton, 2025 vs. South Dakota State	
