= List of North Dakota State Bison in the NFL draft =

This is a list of North Dakota State Bison football players in the NFL draft.

== Key ==
B	Back	K	Kicker	NT	Nose tackle
C	Center	LB	Linebacker	FB	Fullback
DB	Defensive back	P	Punter	HB	Halfback
DE	Defensive end	QB	Quarterback	WR	Wide receiver
DT	Defensive tackle	RB	Running back	G	Guard
E	End	T	Offensive tackle	TE	Tight end

== Selections ==
Year	Round	Pick	Overall	Player	Team	Position
1939	5	2	32	Ernie Wheeler	Pittsburgh Steelers	B
1947	19	4	169	Jerry Mulready	Pittsburgh Steelers	B
1948	30	6	281	Clarence McGeary	Green Bay Packers	OT
1953	24	11	288	Marlow Gudmundson	Los Angeles Rams	B
1965	13	14	182	Bruce Airheart	Baltimore Colts	RB
1966	14	14	214	Ron Hanson	Green Bay Packers	WR
1968	17	26	461	Ken Rota	Green Bay Packers	RB
1969	10	12	246	Bruce Nelson	Green Bay Packers	OT
1969	11	11	271	Mike Berdis	Miami Dolphins	OT
1970	8	15	197	Tim Mjos	Green Bay Packers	RB
1970	14	13	351	Chuck Wald	Atlanta Falcons	WR
1972	8	10	192	Ralph Wirtz	Chicago Bears	WR
1973	15	2	366	Mike Evenson	New Orleans Saints	C
1973	17	18	434	Bob Erickson	San Francisco 49ers	G
1974	2	8	34	Steve Nelson	New England Patriots	LB
1974	10	4	238	Mike Puestow	Cleveland Browns	WR
1974	16	16	406	Sanford Quale	Buffalo Bills	OT
1975	9	26	234	Bruce Reimer	Pittsburgh Steelers	RB
1975	12	6	292	Jerry Dahl	San Diego Chargers	LB
1977	11	1	280	Chuck Rodgers	Tampa Bay Buccaneers	CB
1979	9	12	232	Gordy Sprattler	New York Jets	RB
1981	7	5	171	Kevin Donnalley	St. Louis Cardinals	DB
1984	5	19	131	Dave Piepkorn	Cleveland Browns	OT
1985	2	18	46	Stacy Robinson	New York Giants	WR
1987	12	22	329	Chad Stark	New York Giants	RB
1987	12	27	334	Tyrone Braxton	Denver Broncos	CB
1989	6	17	156	Doug Lloyd	Los Angeles Raiders	RB
1989	9	13	236	Monte Smith	Denver Broncos	G
1991	2	27	54	Phil Hansen	Buffalo Bills	DE
2002	3	19	84	Lamar Gordon	St. Louis Rams	RB
2002	7	2	213	Pete Campion	Carolina Panthers	G
2005	5	29	165	Rob Hunt	Indianapolis Colts	C
2008	6	34	200	Joe Mays	Philadelphia Eagles	LB
2009	7	33	242	Nick Schommer	Tennessee Titans	S
2014	3	3	67	Billy Turner	Miami Dolphins	OT
2015	5	17	153	Kyle Emanuel	San Diego Chargers	LB
2016	1	2	2	Carson Wentz	Philadelphia Eagles	QB
2016	5	16	155	Joe Haeg	Indianapolis Colts	OT
2019	5	28	166	Easton Stick	Los Angeles Chargers	QB
2020	7	40	254	Derrek Tuszka	Denver Broncos	DE
2021	1	3	3	Trey Lance	San Francisco 49ers	QB
2021	2	21	53	Dillon Radunz	Tennessee Titans	OT
2022	2	2	34	Christian Watson	Green Bay Packers	WR
2022	4	31	136	Cordell Volson	Cincinnati Bengals	G
2023	2	17	48	Cody Mauch	Tampa Bay Buccaneers	G
2025	1	18	18	Grey Zabel	Seattle Seahawks	OT
2025	6	39	215	Cam Miller	Las Vegas Raiders	QB
2026	4	36	136	Bryce Lance	New Orleans Saints	WR
2026	6	38	178	Cole Payton	Philadelphia Eagles	QB

== Notable undrafted players ==
Note: No drafts held before 1920

Debut year	Player name	Position	Debut NFL/AFL team	Notes
1971	Dick Hanson	OL	New York Giants	—
1987	Jim Dick	LB	Minnesota Vikings	—
1987	Scott Schutt	LB	New England Patriots	—
2007	Craig Dahl	S	New York Giants	—
2009	Kole Heckendorf	WR	Green Bay Packers	—
2009	Ramon Humber	LB	Indianapolis Colts	—
2009	Tyler Roehl	FB	Seattle Seahawks	—
2012	Paul Cornick	T	New York Jets	—
2012	Matt Veldman	TE	Jacksonville Jaguars	—
2014	Brock Jensen	QB	Miami Dolphins	—
2014	Bryan Shepherd	CB	Washington Redskins	—
2014	Marcus Williams	CB	Houston Texans	—
2015	John Crockett	RB	Green Bay Packers	—
2016	Andrew Bonnet	FB	Carolina Panthers	—
2016	Ben LeCompte	P	Chicago Bears	—
2016	C. J. Smith	CB	Philadelphia Eagles	—
2018	Nick DeLuca	LB	Tennessee Titans	—
2019	Jalen Allison	CB	Tampa Bay Buccaneers	—
2019	Bruce Anderson	RB	Tampa Bay Buccaneers	—
2019	Darrius Shepherd	WR	Green Bay Packers	—
2020	Ben Ellefson	TE	Jacksonville Jaguars	—
2020	Zack Johnson	OL	Green Bay Packers	—
2022	Josh Babicz	TE	Carolina Panthers	—
2022	Brayden Thomas	OLB	Los Angeles Rams	—
2023	Noah Gindorff	TE	Seattle Seahawks	—
2023	Nash Jensen	G	Carolina Panthers	—
2023	Hunter Luepke	FB	Dallas Cowboys	—
2023	Spencer Waege	DL	San Francisco 49ers	—
2024	Jake Kubas	OL	New York Giants	—
2024	Jayden Price	CB	Atlanta Falcons	—
2024	Jalen Sundell	OL	Cleveland Browns	—
2024	TaMerik Williams	RB	Seattle Seahawks	—
2025	Nick Kubitz	LB	Atlanta Falcons	—
2025	Mason Miller	OT	Detroit Lions	—
2025	Eli Mostaert	DT	Jacksonville Jaguars	—
