= 2002 North Dakota State Bison football team =

American college football season

2002 North Dakota State Bison football
- Conference: North Central Conference
- Record: 2–8 (1–7 NCC)
- Head coach: Bob Babich (6th season)
- Offensive coordinator: Glenn Caruso (1st season)
- Offensive scheme: Multiple
- Defensive coordinator: Gus Bradley (6th season)
- Base defense: 4–3
- Home stadium: Fargodome

2002 North Central Conference football standings
	Conf.			Overall
Team	W		L	W		L
No. 7 Northern Colorado $^	8	–	0	12	–	2
No. 21 St. Cloud State	6	–	2	9	–	2
Nebraska–Omaha	5	–	3	6	–	5
Augustana (SD)	4	–	4	7	–	4
South Dakota State	4	–	4	6	–	4
North Dakota	3	–	5	5	–	6
Minnesota State	3	–	5	4	–	7
South Dakota	2	–	6	3	–	8
North Dakota State	1	–	7	2	–	8
$ – Conference champion; ^ – NCAA Division II playoff participant; Rankings from AFCA poll

The 2002 North Dakota State Bison football team was an American football team that represented North Dakota State University during the 2002 NCAA Division II football season as a member of the North Central Conference. In their sixth year under head coach Bob Babich, the team compiled a 2–8 record.

== Schedule ==
Date	Opponent	Site	Result	Attendance	Source
September 7	Winona State*	Fargodome; Fargo, ND	W 34–23	12,499	
September 21	at No. 10 UC Davis*	Toomey Field; Davis, CA	L 7–35	7,300	
September 28	Augustana (SD)	Fargodome; Fargo, ND	L 6–23	10,260	
October 5	at South Dakota	DakotaDome; Vermillion, SD	L 37–40 ^{4OT}	3,930	
October 12	North Dakota	Fargodome; Fargo, ND (Nickel Trophy)	L 6–12	19,042	
October 19	Minnesota State	Fargodome; Fargo, ND	W 37–20	8,541	
October 26	at South Dakota State	Coughlin–Alumni Stadium; Brookings, SD (rivalry)	L 20–25	3,172	
November 2	No. 11 Northern Colorado	Fargodome; Fargo, ND	L 7–29	6,621	
November 9	at Nebraska–Omaha	Al F. Caniglia Field; Omaha, NE	L 42–49	4,000	
November 16	No. 21 St. Cloud State	Fargodome; Fargo, ND	L 7–31	6,768	
*Non-conference game; Rankings from NCAA Division II Football Committee Poll released prior to the game
