= 2001 North Dakota State Bison football team =

American college football season

2001 North Dakota State Bison football
- Conference: North Central Conference
- Record: 7–3 (5–3 NCC)
- Head coach: Bob Babich (5th season)
- Offensive scheme: Multiple
- Defensive coordinator: Gus Bradley (5th season)
- Base defense: 4–3
- Home stadium: Fargodome

2001 North Central Conference football standings
	Conf.			Overall
Team	W		L	W		L
No. 4 North Dakota $^	7	–	1	14	–	1
No. 15 Nebraska–Omaha ^	6	–	2	8	–	3
No. 22 North Dakota State	5	–	3	7	–	3
Northern Colorado	4	–	4	7	–	4
South Dakota State	4	–	4	5	–	6
Augustana (SD)	3	–	5	5	–	5
Minnesota State	3	–	5	4	–	7
St. Cloud State	3	–	5	4	–	7
South Dakota	1	–	7	2	–	8
$ – Conference champion; ^ – NCAA Division II playoff participant; Rankings from AFCA Poll

The 2001 North Dakota State Bison football team was an American football team that represented North Dakota State University during the 2001 NCAA Division II football season as a member of the North Central Conference. In their fifth year under head coach Bob Babich, the team compiled a 7–3 record.

== Schedule ==
Date	Opponent	Rank	Site	Result	Attendance	Source
August 30	No. 20 Angelo State*	No. 2	Fargodome; Fargo, ND	W 48–9	13,060	
September 8	Western State*	No. 2	Fargodome; Fargo, ND	W 66–10	11,325	
September 15	Maine*	No. 2	~~Fargodome~~; Fargo, ND	Canceled (Note: The Maine game was canceled due to the nationwide halt on air travel that followed the September 11th attacks.)		
September 22	at Augustana (SD)	No. 2	Howard Wood Field; Sioux Falls, SD	W 27–3	6,016	
September 29	South Dakota	No. 2	Fargodome; Fargo, ND	W 42–10	14,101	
October 6	at No. 11 North Dakota	No. 2	Memorial Stadium; Grand Forks, ND (Nickel Trophy)	L 7–19	13,500	
October 13	at Minnesota State	No. 10	Blakeslee Stadium; Mankato, MN	L 25–26	4,344	
October 20	South Dakota State^{†}	No. 19	Fargodome; Fargo, ND (rivalry)	W 45–38	13,040	
October 27	at Northern Colorado	No. 18	Nottingham Field; Greeley, CO	L 13–17	4,086	
November 3	No. 2 Nebraska–Omaha		Fargodome; Fargo, ND	W 31–22	9.047	
November 10	at St. Cloud State	No. 25	Selke Field; St. Cloud, MN	W 47–21	3,102	
*Non-conference game; ^{†}Homecoming; Rankings from NCAA Division II Football Committee Poll released prior to the game
