= 1999 North Dakota State Bison football team =

American college football season

1999 North Dakota State Bison football
- Conference: North Central Conference
- Record: 9–2 (7–2 NCC)
- Head coach: Bob Babich (3rd season)
- Offensive coordinator: Mark Mauer (1st season)
- Offensive scheme: Multiple
- Defensive coordinator: Gus Bradley (3rd season)
- Base defense: 4–3
- Home stadium: Fargodome

1999 North Central Conference football standings
	Conf.			Overall
Team	W		L	W		L
No. 3 Northern Colorado +^	8	–	1	11	–	2
No. 9 North Dakota +^	8	–	1	9	–	2
No. 13 North Dakota State	7	–	2	9	–	2
No. T–15 South Dakota State	6	–	3	8	–	3
Nebraska–Omaha	5	–	4	7	–	4
Augustana (SD)	3	–	6	5	–	6
South Dakota	3	–	6	4	–	7
Minnesota State	2	–	7	4	–	7
Morningside	2	–	7	3	–	8
St. Cloud State	1	–	8	3	–	8
+ – Conference co-champions; ^ – NCAA Division II playoff participant; Rankings from NCAA Division II Football Committee poll

The 1999 North Dakota State Bison football team was an American football team that represented North Dakota State University during the 1999 NCAA Division II football season as a member of the North Central Conference. In their third year under head coach Bob Babich, the team compiled a 9–2 record.

== Schedule ==
Date	Opponent	Rank	Site	Result	Source
September 2	Ferris State*		Fargodome; Fargo, ND	W 55–35	
September 11	Minnesota State–Moorhead*		Fargodome; Fargo, ND	W 71–20	
September 18	St. Cloud State		Fargodome; Fargo, ND	W 35–6	
September 25	at South Dakota	No. 12	DakotaDome; Vermillion, SD	W 45–14	
October 2	at No. 15 North Dakota	No. 11	Memorial Stadium; Grand Forks, ND (Nickel Trophy)	L 10–13	
October 9	Augustana (SD)	No. 16	Fargodome; Fargo, ND	W 30–14	
October 16	at South Dakota State	No. 13	Coughlin–Alumni Stadium; Brookings, SD (rivalry)	W 28–7	
October 23	No. 6 Nebraska–Omaha	No. 12	Fargodome; Fargo, ND	W 31–14	
October 30	Minnesota State	No. 11	Fargodome; Fargo, ND	W 56–14	
November 6	at No. 4 Northern Colorado	No. 11	Nottingham Field; Greeley, CO	L 39–41	
November 13	at Morningside	No. 13	Roberts Stadium; Sioux City, IA	W 38–6	
*Non-conference game; Rankings from NCAA Division II Football Committee Poll released prior to the game
