= 1974 North Dakota State Bison football team =

American college football season

1974 North Dakota State Bison football

NCC co-champion
- Conference: North Central Conference
- Record: 7–4 (5–2 NCC)
- Head coach: Ev Kjelbertson (2nd season)
- Home stadium: Dacotah Field

1974 North Central Conference football standings
	Conf.					Overall
Team	W		L		T	W		L		T
South Dakota +	5	–	2	–	0	8	–	3	–	0
North Dakota State +	5	–	2	–	0	7	–	4	–	0
North Dakota +	5	–	2	–	0	6	–	4	–	0
South Dakota State	4	–	3	–	0	6	–	5	–	0
Mankato State	3	–	3	–	1	5	–	4	–	1
Northern Iowa	3	–	3	–	1	5	–	4	–	1
Augustana (SD)	2	–	5	–	0	4	–	6	–	0
Morningside	0	–	7	–	0	0	–	9	–	0
+ – Conference co-champions

The 1974 North Dakota State Bison football team was an American football team that represented North Dakota State University during the 1974 NCAA Division II football season as a member of the North Central Conference. In their second year under head coach Ev Kjelbertson, the team compiled a 7–4 record.

== Schedule ==
Date	Opponent	Site	Result	Attendance	Source
September 7	Nebraska–Omaha*	Dacotah Field; Fargo, ND	W 3–0	6,600	
September 14	at Northern Arizona*	Lumberjack Stadium; Flagstaff, AZ	L 15–27	6,000	
September 21	Morningside	Dacotah Field; Fargo, ND	W 15–7	4,800	
September 28	at Northern Iowa	O. R. Latham Stadium; Cedar Falls, IA	L 0–20	1,500–3,575	
October 5	South Dakota State	Dacotah Field; Fargo, ND (rivalry)	W 28–0	4,900	
October 12	Augustana (SD)^{†}	Dacotah Field; Fargo, ND	W 29–14	7,600	
October 19	at North Dakota	Memorial Stadium; Grand Forks, ND (Nickel Trophy)	L 20–31	14,500	
October 26	Mankato State	Dacotah Field; Fargo, ND	W 17–14	2,733	
November 2	at South Dakota	Inman Field; Vermillion, SD	W 13–12	5,500	
November 9	Milwaukee*	Dacotah Field; Fargo, ND	W 14–6	3,200	
November 16	at Montana State*	Sales Stadium; Bozeman, MT	L 14–34	6,350–6,471	
*Non-conference game; ^{†}Homecoming
