= 1991 North Dakota State Bison football team =

American college football season

1991 North Dakota State Bison football

NCC champion

NCAA Division II First Round, L 7–27 vs. Mankato State
- Conference: North Central Conference
- Record: 7–3 (7–1 NCC)
- Head coach: Rocky Hager (5th season)
- Home stadium: Dacotah Field

1991 North Central Conference football standings
	Conf.					Overall
Team	W		L		T	W		L		T
No. 7 North Dakota State $^	7	–	1	–	0	7	–	3	–	0
No. 4 Northern Colorado ^	6	–	2	–	0	8	–	3	–	0
No. 17 North Dakota	6	–	2	–	0	7	–	2	–	0
South Dakota State	5	–	3	–	0	7	–	3	–	0
No. 13 Mankato State ^	5	–	3	–	0	8	–	4	–	0
St. Cloud State	5	–	3	–	0	6	–	3	–	0
Nebraska–Omaha	4	–	4	–	0	6	–	4	–	0
Morningside	1	–	7	–	0	2	–	8	–	0
South Dakota	1	–	7	–	0	1	–	8	–	0
Augustana (SD)	0	–	8	–	0	0	–	10	–	0
$ – Conference champion; ^ – NCAA Division II playoff participant; Rankings from NCAA Division II Football Committee poll

The 1991 North Dakota State Bison football team was an American football team that represented North Dakota State University during the 1991 NCAA Division II football season as a member of the North Central Conference. In their fifth year under head coach Rocky Hager, the team compiled a 7–3 record and finished as NCC champion.

== Schedule ==
Date	Opponent	Rank	Site	Result	Attendance	Source
September 14	No. 6 Grand Valley State*	No. 1	Dacotah Field; Fargo, ND	L 17–21	13,629	
September 21	Augustana (SD)	No. 12	Dacotah Field; Fargo, ND	W 41–6	11,892	
September 28	at South Dakota State	No. 9	Coughlin–Alumni Stadium; Brookings, SD (rivalry)	W 35–0	6,207	
October 5	South Dakota^{†}	No. 9	Dacotah Field; Fargo, ND	W 35–12	11,439	
October 12	at No. 16 St. Cloud State	No. 8	Selke Field; St. Cloud, MN	W 32–9	4,114	
October 19	Mankato State	No. 6	Dacotah Field; Fargo, ND	W 21–13	10,052	
October 26	at No. 12 Northern Colorado	No. 5	Jackson Field; Greeley, CO	L 14–23	5,348	
November 2	Nebraska–Omaha	No. 11	Dacotah Field; Fargo, ND	Canceled		
November 9	vs. Morningside	No. 9	DakotaDome; Vermillion, SD	W 56–10	1,500	
November 16	No. 17 North Dakota	No. 7	Dacotah Field; Fargo, ND (Nickel Trophy)	W 35–28	12,503	
November 23	No. 13 Mankato State	No. 7	Dacotah Field; Fargo, ND (NCAA Division II First Round)	L 7–27	4,839	
*Non-conference game; ^{†}Homecoming; Rankings from NCAA Division II Football Committee Poll released prior to the game
