= 1989 North Dakota State Bison football team =

American college football season

1989 North Dakota State Bison football

NCAA Division II Quarterfinal, L 17–21 vs. Jacksonville State
- Conference: North Central Conference
- Record: 8–3–1 (6–2–1 NCC)
- Head coach: Rocky Hager (3rd season)
- Home stadium: Dacotah Field

1989 North Central Conference football standings
	Conf.					Overall
Team	W		L		T	W		L		T
No. T–5 St. Cloud State $^	8	–	1	–	0	10	–	2	–	0
No. 11 Augustana (SD) ^	6	–	2	–	1	8	–	3	–	1
No. 17 North Dakota State ^	6	–	2	–	1	8	–	3	–	1
Northern Colorado	5	–	4	–	0	6	–	4	–	0
Nebraska–Omaha	5	–	4	–	0	6	–	5	–	0
Mankato State	4	–	4	–	1	5	–	5	–	1
South Dakota	4	–	5	–	0	5	–	6	–	0
South Dakota State	3	–	6	–	0	5	–	6	–	0
North Dakota	2	–	6	–	1	3	–	7	–	1
Morningside	0	–	9	–	0	2	–	9	–	0
$ – Conference champion; ^ – NCAA Division II playoff participant; Rankings from NCAA Division II Football Committee poll

The 1989 North Dakota State Bison football team was an American football team that represented North Dakota State University during the 1989 NCAA Division II football season as a member of the North Central Conference. In their third year under head coach Rocky Hager, the team compiled a 8–3–1 record.

== Schedule ==
Date	Opponent	Rank	Site	Result	Attendance	Source
September 9	Northern Michigan*	No. 1	Dacotah Field; Fargo, ND	W 55–23	18,500	
September 16	Mankato State	No. 1	Dacotah Field; Fargo, ND	W 25–18	18,500	
September 23	at South Dakota State	No. 1	Coughlin–Alumni Stadium; Brookings, SD (rivalry)	W 33–12	10,413	
September 30	South Dakota	No. 1	Dacotah Field; Fargo, ND	W 40–20	18,500	
October 7	at Morningside	No. 1	Elwood Olsen Stadium; Sioux City, IA	W 26–20	1,450	
October 14	Northern Colorado^{†}	No. 1	Dacotah Field; Fargo, ND	W 35–29	19,000	
October 21	at No. 9 St. Cloud State	No. 1	Selke Field; St. Cloud, MN	L 13–20	6,044	
October 28	Augustana (SD)	No. 8	Dacotah Field; Fargo, ND	T 7–7	14,500	
November 4	at Nebraska–Omaha	No. 10	Al F. Caniglia Field; Omaha, NE	L 7–27	4,100	
November 11	North Dakota	No. 17	Dacotah Field; Fargo, ND (Nickel Trophy)	W 21–0	12,000	
November 18	No. 7 Edinboro*	No. 17	Dacotah Field; Fargo, ND (NCAA Division II First Round)	W 45–32	8,400	
November 25	No. 2 Jacksonville State*	No. 17	Paul Snow Stadium; Jacksonville, AL (NCAA Division II Quarterfinal)	L 17–21	8,500	
*Non-conference game; ^{†}Homecoming; Rankings from NCAA Division II Football Committee Poll released prior to the game
