= 1987 North Dakota State Bison football team =

American college football season

1987 North Dakota State Bison football
- Conference: North Central Conference
- Record: 6–4 (6–3 NCC)
- Head coach: Rocky Hager (1st season)
- Home stadium: Dacotah Field

1987 North Central Conference football standings
	Conf.					Overall
Team	W		L		T	W		L		T
No. 7 Mankato State $^	8	–	1	–	0	9	–	3	–	0
St. Cloud State	6	–	3	–	0	7	–	4	–	0
North Dakota State	6	–	3	–	0	6	–	4	–	0
Nebraska–Omaha	5	–	4	–	0	7	–	4	–	0
South Dakota	5	–	4	–	0	7	–	4	–	0
North Dakota	5	–	4	–	0	6	–	4	–	0
South Dakota State	4	–	5	–	0	5	–	5	–	0
Morningside	3	–	6	–	0	4	–	7	–	0
Northern Colorado	2	–	7	–	0	3	–	8	–	0
Augustana (SD)	1	–	8	–	0	2	–	9	–	0
$ – Conference champion; ^ – NCAA Division II playoff participant; Rankings from NCAA Division II Football Committee poll

The 1987 North Dakota State Bison football team was an American football team that represented North Dakota State University during the 1987 NCAA Division II football season as a member of the North Central Conference. In their first year under head coach Rocky Hager, the team compiled a 6–4 record.

== Schedule ==
Date	Opponent	Rank	Site	Result	Attendance	Source
September 12	at Northern Michigan*	No. 1	Memorial Field; Marquette, MI	L 6–10	3,580	
September 19	South Dakota State	No. 9	Dacotah Field; Fargo, ND (rivalry)	W 43–7	16,300	
September 26	at Augustana (SD)	No. 8	Howard Wood Field; Sioux Falls, SD	W 34–0	2,500	
October 3	Morningside	No. 6	Dacotah Field; Fargo, ND	W 33–0	13,500	
October 10	at St. Cloud State	No. 6	Selke Field; St. Cloud, MN	W 24–3	3,958	
October 17	Mankato State	No. 6	Dacotah Field; Fargo, ND	L 22–28	16,800	
October 24	Northern Colorado	No. 15	Dacotah Field; Fargo, ND	W 43–21	10,500	
October 31	at South Dakota	No. 17	DakotaDome; Vermillion, SD	L 12–28	7,800	
November 7	at Nebraska–Omaha		Al F. Caniglia Field; Omaha, NE	L 21–27	3,300	
November 14	North Dakota		Dacotah Field; Fargo, ND (Nickel Trophy)	W 42–10	13,500	
*Non-conference game; Rankings from NCAA Division II Football Committee Poll released prior to the game
