= 1974 Northern Iowa Panthers football team =

American college football season

1974 Northern Iowa Panthers football
- Conference: North Central Conference
- Record: 5–4–1 (3–3–1 NCC)
- Head coach: Stan Sheriff (15th season)
- Defensive coordinator: Dennis Remmert (4th season)
- Home stadium: O. R. Latham Stadium

1974 North Central Conference football standings
	Conf.					Overall
Team	W		L		T	W		L		T
South Dakota +	5	–	2	–	0	8	–	3	–	0
North Dakota State +	5	–	2	–	0	7	–	4	–	0
North Dakota +	5	–	2	–	0	6	–	4	–	0
South Dakota State	4	–	3	–	0	6	–	5	–	0
Mankato State	3	–	3	–	1	5	–	4	–	1
Northern Iowa	3	–	3	–	1	5	–	4	–	1
Augustana (SD)	2	–	5	–	0	4	–	6	–	0
Morningside	0	–	7	–	0	0	–	9	–	0
+ – Conference co-champions

The 1974 Northern Iowa Panthers football team was an American football team that represented the University of Northern Iowa as a member of the North Central Conference (NCC) during the 1974 NCAA Division II football season. In its 15th season under head coach Stan Sheriff, the team compiled a 5–4–1 record (3–3–1 in conference games) and tied for fifth place in the NCC.

The team's statistical leaders included junior quarterback Bill Salmon (1,699 passing yards), senior halfback Patrick Batten (1,013 rushing yards, 72 points scored), junior wide receiver Dave Schooley (892 receiving yards), and senior halfback Dave Hodam (36 points scored). Salmon's average of 21.2 yard per completion remains a school record as of 2026. Four Northern Iowa players were named to the all-NCC team: Batten; Schooley; offensive guard Charles Frisk; defensive back Nick Maragos.

The team played its home games at O. R. Latham Stadium in Cedar Falls, Iowa.

== Schedule ==
Date	Opponent	Site	Result	Attendance	Source
September 7	at Pittsburg State*	Carnie Smith Stadium; Pittsburg, KS	W 31–22	3,500	
September 14	at Western Illinois*	Hanson Field; Macomb, IL	W 14–40	11,400	
September 21	Mankato State	O. R. Latham Stadium; Cedar Falls, IA	T 28–28	5,251	
September 28	North Dakota State	O. R. Latham Stadium; Cedar Falls, IA	W 20–0	1,500–3,575	
October 5	at No. 10 North Dakota	Memorial Stadium; Grand Forks, ND	L 26–42	7,200	
October 12	Drake*	O. R. Latham Stadium; Cedar Falls, IA	W 41–17	8,500–8,549	
October 19	Morningside	O. R. Latham Stadium; Cedar Falls, IA	W 49–14	4,500	
October 26	at Augustana (SD)	Howard Wood Field; Sioux Falls, SD	L 23–38	5,700	
November 2	South Dakota State	O. R. Latham Stadium; Cedar Falls, IA	W 22–21	4,950	
November 9	at No. 15 South Dakota	Inman Field; Vermillion, SD	L 14–26	2,500	
*Non-conference game; Rankings from AP Poll released prior to the game
