= Rocky Hager =

American football player and coach (born 1951)

Biographical details
- Born: August 29, 1951 (age 75)

Playing career
- 1969–1972: Minot State
- Position: Offensive lineman

Coaching career (HC unless noted)
- 1979: North Dakota State (assistant)
- 1980: Morningside (DL)
- 1981–1984: Augustana (SD) (DC)
- 1985–1986: North Dakota State (DC/LB)
- 1987–1996: North Dakota State
- 1997–2003: Temple (assistant)
- 2004–2009: Northeastern
- 2012: Bryant (DL)
- 2013–2015: TCNJ (DC)
- 2016: TCNJ (interim HC)
- 2017–2021: TCNJ (ST/LB)

Head coaching record
- Overall: 113–80–1
- Tournaments: 12–5 (NCAA D-II playoffs)

Accomplishments and honors

Championships
- 2 NCAA Division II (1988, 1990); 5 NCC (1988, 1990–1992, 1994)

Awards
- 2× Division II National Coach of the Year (1988, 1990)

Ralph Earl "Rocky" Hager III (born August 29, 1951) is an American former college football coach. He served as the head football coach at North Dakota State University from 1987 to 1996 and Northeastern University from 2004 until 2009, after which the school dropped their football program. He was also the interim head football coach at The College of New Jersey (TCNJ) for the 2016 season. Hager won two NCAA Division II Football Championships at North Dakota State, in 1988 and 1990.

Hager graduated from Harvey High School in Harvey, North Dakota in 1969. He married Peggy Kean Kress in 1973.

== Head coaching record ==
Year	Team	Overall	Conference	Standing	Bowl/playoffs
North Dakota State Bison (North Central Conference) (1987–1996)
1987	North Dakota State	6–4	6–3	T–2nd	
1988	North Dakota State	14–0	9–0	1st	W NCAA Division II Championship
1989	North Dakota State	8–3–1	6–2–1	T–2nd	L NCAA Division II Quarterfinal
1990	North Dakota State	14–0	9–0	1st	W NCAA Division II Championship
1991	North Dakota State	7–3	7–1	1st	L NCAA Division II First Round
1992	North Dakota State	10–2	8–1	1st	L NCAA Division II Quarterfinal
1993	North Dakota State	7–3	6–3	T–3rd	
1994	North Dakota State	9–3	7–2	T–1st	L NCAA Division II Quarterfinal
1995	North Dakota State	10–3	7–2	T–2nd	L NCAA Division II Quarterfinal
1996	North Dakota State	6–4	5–4	5th	
North Dakota State:		91–25–1	70–18–1		
Northeastern Huskies (Atlantic 10 Conference) (2004–2006)
2004	Northeastern	5–6	4–4	T–5th (North)	
2005	Northeastern	2–9	2–6	T–10th (North)	
2006	Northeastern	5–6	4–4	T–6th (North)	
Northeastern Huskies (Colonial Athletic Association) (2007–2009)
2007	Northeastern	3–8	2–6	T–9th (North)	
2008	Northeastern	2–10	1–7	T–10th (North)	
2009	Northeastern	3–8	3–5	T–8th (North)	
Northeastern:		20–47	16–32		
TCNJ Lions (New Jersey Athletic Conference) (2016)
2016	TCNJ	2–8	2–7	8th	
TCNJ:		2–8	2–7		
Total:		113–80–1			
National championship Conference title Conference division title or championship game berth
