= 1988 North Dakota State Bison football team =

American college football season

1988 North Dakota State Bison football

NCAA Division II champion NCC champion

NCAA Division II Championship Game, W 35–21 vs. Portland State
- Conference: North Central Conference
- Record: 14–0 (9–0 NCC)
- Head coach: Rocky Hager (2nd season)
- Home stadium: Dacotah Field

1988 North Central Conference football standings
	Conf.					Overall
Team	W		L		T	W		L		T
No. 1 North Dakota State $^	9	–	0	–	0	14	–	0	–	0
No. 18 Augustana (SD) ^	6	–	3	–	0	8	–	4	–	0
South Dakota State	6	–	3	–	0	7	–	4	–	0
North Dakota	5	–	4	–	0	7	–	4	–	0
No. 17 St. Cloud State	5	–	4	–	0	7	–	4	–	0
South Dakota	4	–	5	–	0	6	–	5	–	0
Northern Colorado	4	–	5	–	0	5	–	5	–	0
Nebraska–Omaha	4	–	5	–	0	6	–	5	–	0
Mankato State	2	–	7	–	0	3	–	8	–	0
Morningside	0	–	9	–	0	0	–	11	–	0
$ – Conference champion; ^ – NCAA Division II playoff participant; Rankings from NCAA Division II Football Committee poll

The 1988 North Dakota State football team represented North Dakota State University during the 1988 NCAA Division II football season, and completed the 92nd season of Bison football. The Bison played their home games at Dacotah Field in Fargo, North Dakota. The 1988 team came off a 6–4 record from the previous season. The team was led by coach Rocky Hager. The team finished the regular season with an undefeated 10–0 record and made the NCAA Division II playoffs. The Bison defeated the Portland State, 35–21, in the National Championship Game en route to the program's fourth NCAA Division II Football Championship.

== Schedule ==
Date	Opponent	Rank	Site	Result	Attendance	Source
September 10	No. 3 Northern Michigan*	No. 6	Dacotah Field; Fargo, ND	W 55–21	18,200	
September 17	at South Dakota State	No. 2	Coughlin–Alumni Stadium; Brookings, SD (rivalry)	W 55–26	6,390	
September 24	Augustana (SD)	No. 1	Dacotah Field; Fargo, ND	W 28–26	15,500	
October 1	at Morningside	No. 1	Elwood Olsen Stadium; Sioux City, IA	W 62–7	3,475	
October 8	No. 17 St. Cloud State	No. 1	Dacotah Field; Fargo, ND	W 29–28	18,400	
October 15	at Mankato State	No. 1	Blakeslee Stadium; Mankato, MN	W 21–17	5,775	
October 22	at Northern Colorado	No. 1	Jackson Field; Greeley, CO	W 55–28	3,041	
October 29	South Dakota	No. 1	Dacotah Field; Fargo, ND	W 34–14	11,800	
November 5	Nebraska–Omaha	No. 1	Dacotah Field; Fargo, ND	W 23–5	9,500	
November 12	at North Dakota	No. 1	Memorial Stadium; Grand Forks, ND (Nickel Trophy)	W 34–27	11,600	
November 19	No. 18 Augustana (SD)	No. 1	Dacotah Field; Fargo, ND (NCAA Division II First Round)	W 49–7	7,500	
November 26	No. 11 Millersville*	No. 1	Dacotah Field; Fargo, ND (NCAA Division II Quarterfinal)	W 36–26	10,200	
December 3	No. 10 Sacramento State*	No. 1	Dacotah Field; Fargo, ND (NCAA Division II Semifinal)	W 42–20	13,200	
December 10	No. 4 Portland State*	No. 1	Braly Municipal Stadium; Florence, AL (NCAA Division II Championship Game)	W 35–21	6,763	
*Non-conference game; Rankings from NCAA Division II Football Committee Poll released prior to the game
