= 1996 North Dakota State Bison football team =

American college football season

1996 North Dakota State Bison football
- Conference: North Central Conference
- Record: 6–4 (5–4 NCC)
- Head coach: Rocky Hager (10th season)
- Home stadium: Fargodome

1996 North Central Conference football standings
	Conf.			Overall
Team	W		L	W		L
No. T–4 Nebraska–Omaha $^	8	–	1	10	–	2
No. 15 Northern Colorado ^	6	–	3	12	–	3
No. 19 North Dakota	6	–	3	7	–	3
South Dakota State	6	–	3	7	–	4
North Dakota State	5	–	4	6	–	4
South Dakota	4	–	5	6	–	5
Mankato State	4	–	5	5	–	6
St. Cloud State	4	–	5	5	–	6
Augustana (SD)	2	–	7	3	–	8
Morningside	0	–	9	1	–	10
$ – Conference champion; ^ – NCAA Division II playoff participant; Rankings from NCAA Division II Football Committee poll

The 1996 North Dakota State Bison football team was an American football team that represented North Dakota State University during the 1996 NCAA Division II football season as a member of the North Central Conference. In their tenth year under head coach Rocky Hager, the team compiled a 6–4 record.

== Schedule ==
Date	Opponent	Rank	Site	Result	Attendance	Source
September 7	No. 3 Texas A&M–Kingsville*	No. 5	Fargodome; Fargo, ND	W 20–10	16,487	
September 21	St. Cloud State	No. 2	Fargodome; Fargo, ND	W 34–0	17,002	
September 28	Nebraska–Omaha	No. 1	Fargodome; Fargo, ND	L 21–24	12,784	
October 5	at Augustana (SD)	No. 13	Howard Wood Field; Sioux Falls, SD	L 25–34	4,725	
October 12	at No. 19 Northern Colorado		Nottingham Field; Greeley, CO	L 36–38	4,521	
October 19	No. 14 South Dakota State		Fargodome; Fargo, ND (rivalry)	W 31–7	11,635	
October 26	Mankato State		Fargodome; Fargo, ND	W 48–27	12,064	
November 2	at No. 11 South Dakota		DakotaDome; Vermillion, SD	W 59–20	5,823	
November 9	North Dakota		Fargodome; Fargo, ND (Nickel Trophy)	L 19–33	18,600	
November 16	at Morningside		Elwood Olsen Stadium; Sioux City, IA	W 20–6	976	
*Non-conference game; Rankings from NCAA Division II Football Committee Poll released prior to the game
