= Ben Ellefson =

American football player (born 1996)

Minnesota Vikings
- Title: Offensive assistant

Personal information
- Born: September 1, 1996 (age 30); Hawley, Minnesota, U.S.
- Listed height: 6 ft 3 in (1.91 m)
- Listed weight: 250 lb (113 kg)

Career information
- Position: Tight end (No. 86, 82)
- High school: Hawley
- College: North Dakota State (2015–2019)
- NFL draft: 2020: undrafted

Career history

Playing
- Jacksonville Jaguars (2020); Minnesota Vikings (2021–2022)

Coaching
- Minnesota Vikings (2023–present) Offensive assistant

Awards and highlights
- 3× FCS national champion (2017, 2018, 2019)

Career NFL statistics
- Receptions: 4
- Receiving yards: 36
- Stats at Pro Football Reference

Benjamin Ellefson (born September 1, 1996) is an American former professional football player who was a tight end in the National Football League (NFL). He played college football for the North Dakota State Bison before playing in the NFL for the Jacksonville Jaguars and Minnesota Vikings.

== College career ==
Ellefson played college football for the North Dakota State Bison. During his senior season, Ellefson caught 15 passes for 199 yards and five touchdowns. He was also a noted blocker during the team's running game. Ellefson finished his college career with 35 receptions for 463 yards and 16 touchdowns, a program record for tight ends.

== Professional career ==
Pre-draft measurables
Height	Weight	Arm length	Hand span	Wingspan
6 ft 3 1/8 in (1.91 m)	249 lb (113 kg)	32 3/8 in (0.82 m)	10 1/4 in (0.26 m)	6 ft 6 1/4 in (1.99 m)
All values from Pro Day

=== Jacksonville Jaguars ===
Ellefson went undrafted in the 2020 NFL draft, and was signed by the Jacksonville Jaguars. He was waived during final roster cuts on September 5, 2020, and signed to the team's practice squad the next day. He was elevated to the active roster ahead of the team's 2020 season opener against the Indianapolis Colts on September 12, and reverted to the practice squad after the game. He was elevated again on September 19 for the team's week 2 game against the Tennessee Titans, and reverted to the practice squad after the game. He was placed on the practice squad/COVID-19 list by the team on October 17, 2020, and was activated back to the practice squad on October 22. He was promoted to the active roster on October 22. He was placed on injured reserve on December 5.

On August 31, 2021, Ellefson was waived by the Jaguars.

=== Minnesota Vikings ===
On September 1, 2021, Ellefson was claimed off waivers by the Minnesota Vikings. He was placed on injured reserve on October 28 with knee and foot injuries. He was activated on January 8, 2022.

On October 8, 2022, Ellefson was placed on injured reserve. He was activated on November 30. He was placed back on injured reserve on December 7.

On June 1, 2023, Ellefson announced his retirement from professional football.

== Coaching career ==
Five days after retiring as a player, Ellefson was added to the Vikings' coaching staff as an Offensive Assistant. Following a series of injuries and multiple surgeries that left him unable to continue playing at a high level, Ellefson met with Minnesota Vikings head coach Kevin O’Connell to discuss his future. At just 26 years old, Ellefson told O’Connell he could no longer physically play, but expressed a strong desire to stay involved with the game — even if that meant starting by “picking up coffees for coaches.”

Impressed by Ellefson's character and passion for football, O’Connell brought him into the organization without a clearly defined role. Over the next year, Ellefson immersed himself in coaching, working with the Vikings' tight ends and contributing to game planning, play charting, and run game preparation.

Ellefson’s inspiration to coach was shaped early by his tight ends coach at North Dakota State, Tyler Roehl, who taught him the importance of technique and discipline. As he developed in his new role, Ellefson embraced the demanding nature of coaching and was promoted to an offensive assistant. He continues to grow on the Vikings' staff, known for his attention to detail, strong work ethic, and ability to connect with players.
