= 1993 North Dakota State Bison football team =

American college football season

1993 North Dakota State Bison football
- Conference: North Central Conference
- Record: 7–3 (6–3 NCC)
- Head coach: Rocky Hager (7th season)
- Home stadium: Fargodome

1993 North Central Conference football standings
	Conf.					Overall
Team	W		L		T	W		L		T
No. 12 Mankato State +^	7	–	2	–	0	10	–	3	–	0
No. 9 North Dakota +^	7	–	2	–	0	10	–	3	–	0
Northern Colorado	6	–	3	–	0	8	–	3	–	0
No. T–20 North Dakota State	6	–	3	–	0	7	–	3	–	0
South Dakota State	6	–	3	–	0	7	–	4	–	0
South Dakota	4	–	5	–	0	6	–	5	–	0
St. Cloud State	4	–	5	–	0	5	–	5	–	0
Augustana (SD)	3	–	6	–	0	4	–	7	–	0
Morningside	1	–	8	–	0	2	–	9	–	0
Nebraska–Omaha	1	–	8	–	0	2	–	9	–	0
+ – Conference co-champions; ^ – NCAA Division II playoff participant; Rankings from NCAA Division II Football Committee poll

The 1993 North Dakota State Bison football team was an American football team that represented North Dakota State University during the 1993 NCAA Division II football season as a member of the North Central Conference. In their seventh year under head coach Rocky Hager, the team compiled a 7–3 record.

== Schedule ==
Date	Opponent	Rank	Site	Result	Attendance	Source
September 4	No. 3 Pittsburg State*	No. 1	Fargodome; Fargo, ND	W 35–16	18,059	
September 18	Nebraska–Omaha	No. 1	Fargodome; Fargo, ND	W 28–7	14,944	
September 25	Morningside	No. 1	Fargodome; Fargo, ND	W 21–15	13,696	
October 2	at No. 8 Mankato State	No. 1	Blakeslee Stadium; Mankato, MN	L 27–28	6,000	
October 9	at South Dakota State	No. 8	Coughlin–Alumni Stadium; Brookings, SD (rivalry)	L 30–42	6,225	
October 16	South Dakota^{†}		Fargodome; Fargo, ND	W 35–14	16,678	
October 23	at St. Cloud State		Selke Field; St. Cloud, MN	W 32–24	4,786	
October 30	at No. 10 North Dakota		Memorial Stadium; Grand Forks, ND (Nickel Trophy)	L 21–22	13,034	
November 6	Northern Colorado		Fargodome; Fargo, ND	W 40–14	11,565	
November 13	at Augustana (SD)	No. 20	Howard Wood Field; Sioux Falls, SD	W 31–14	1,523	
*Non-conference game; ^{†}Homecoming; Rankings from NCAA Division II Football Committee Poll released prior to the game
