= Jeff Bentrim =

American football player (born 1965)

Profile
- Position: Quarterback

Personal information
- Born: June 21, 1965 (age 61); Saint Paul, Minnesota, U.S.

Career information
- College: North Dakota State

Career history
- 1987–1990: Saskatchewan Roughriders

Awards and highlights
- Grey Cup champion (1989); 3× Division II national champion (1983, 1985, 1986); Harlon Hill Trophy (1986)
- College Football Hall of Fame

Jeff Bentrim (born June 21, 1965) is an American former gridiron football player who played quarterback. He was elected to the College Football Hall of Fame in 1998 and the Bison Athletic Hall of Fame in 2001. He was recruited by the Saskatchewan Roughriders of the Canadian Football League (CFL). In Saskatchewan, he played third-string quarterback behind Kent Austin and Tom Burgess. The Roughriders promoted him to second-string quarterback after the 1989 season when Tom Burgess was traded to the Winnipeg Blue Bombers. He was part of three Division II football championship teams collegiately and the 1989 Grey Cup champion Saskatchewan Roughriders professionally.
