= Mike McTague =

Canadian football player (born 1957)

No. 9, 14
- Positions: Wide receiver, punter

Personal information
- Born: May 31, 1957 (age 69); Ottawa, Ontario, Canada
- Listed height: 6 ft 0 in (1.83 m)
- Listed weight: 185 lb (84 kg)

Career information
- High school: Woburn (Toronto)
- College: North Dakota State

Career history
- Calgary Stampeders (1979–1984); Montreal Concordes/Alouettes (1985–1986); Saskatchewan Roughriders (1986–1987)

Awards and highlights
- CFL East All-Star (1985)

Mike McTague (born May 31, 1957) is a Canadian former professional football player who played nine seasons in the Canadian Football League (CFL) with the Calgary Stampeders, Montreal Concordes/Alouettes, and Saskatchewan Roughriders. He played college football at North Dakota State University.

== Early life and college ==
Mike McTague was born on May 31, 1957, in Ottawa, Ontario. He played high school football at Woburn Collegiate Institute in Toronto as a quarterback. He led the Woburn Wildcats to three straight senior A borough championships. McTague also participated in track and field in high school, setting the Scarborough and Toronto district record in the triple jump. He competed in the long jump as well.

McTague accepted a full scholarship to play college football for the North Dakota State Bison of North Dakota State University. He was recruited as a quarterback but quickly switched to wide receiver. He also served as the team's placekicker. He led the team in both scoring and receiving during the 1977 and 1978 seasons, earning All-North Central Conference (NCC) recognition each year. As a senior in 1978, McTague earned team MVP and honorable mention All-American honors. He set several school and NCC records for receiving, kicking, and scoring. He was a perfect 32 for 32 on field goals in college and converted 109 of 115 extra points.

== Professional career ==
McTague was the territorial protection of the Toronto Argonauts in the 1979 CFL draft, making him Toronto's first pick that year. In May 1979, he was traded to the Calgary Stampeders for Tony Adams and Cole Doty. McTague was the Stampeders' nominee for the CFL's Most Outstanding Rookie Award in 1979 after punting 146 times for 6,331 yards and a 43.4 average. He played in 95 of 96 regular season games for the Stampeders from 1979 to 1984 as a wide receiver and punter. His 44.1 yards per punt (on 804 punts) was a Calgary franchise record. McTague also set team records with a 92-yard punt, 21 punts in one game, and 153 punts in one season.

In May 1985, McTague was traded to the Montreal Concordes for Eugene Belliveau. McTague earned CFL East All-Star honors for the 1985 season at slotback after catching 47 passes for 660 yards and two touchdowns while also averaging 41.8 yards per punt. He was also Montreal's nominee for the Schenley Award, given to the best player in the CFL, and the team's nominee for Most Outstanding Canadian. On July 4, 1986, against the Argonauts, McTague only averaged 35 yards per punt and had a blocked kick recovered for a touchdown by Toronto. He was released on July 17, 1986, after dropping five passes in two games. McTague's salary may have also factored into his release. He was on a five-year contract reportedly worth CA$120,000.

McTague signed with the Saskatchewan Roughriders on July 20, 1986, after clearing waivers. He played in 14 games for the Roughriders in 1986. He was released after the third game of the 1987 season due to poor play. He had only been only been averaging 35.1 yards per punt. He also lost the placekicking job to Dave Ridgway after missing an extra point and a field goal in the team's season opening loss to the Stampeders 29–28. After his release, McTague said he was tired of moving around so much and that he would only play somewhere if he enjoyed it. He contacted the Stampeders but was not signed. McTague finished his CFL career with totals of 130 games dressed, 214 receptions for 3,037 yards and 11 touchdowns, 1,040 punts for 44,885 yards, 67 rouges, 78 kickoffs for 4,469 yards, seven of 11 field goals, 14 of 15 extra points, and two completions on four passing attempts for 32 yards.

== Personal life ==
McTague took broadcasting classes at Mount Royal College during his CFL career. In 1989, founded McTague Financial in Calgary, which provides investment and insurance services. He was inducted into North Dakota State's athletics hall of fame in 1990. In 1993, he was named the punter on the Calgary Stampeders all-time team, as voted on by the fans. In 1996, McTague received the Bicentennial Civic Award from the City of Scarborough for his high school, college, and pro careers.
