= Doug Lloyd =

American football player (born 1965)

No. 37
- Position: Running back

Personal information
- Born: August 31, 1965 (age 61); Beaver Dam, Wisconsin, U.S.
- Listed height: 6 ft 1 in (1.85 m)
- Listed weight: 220 lb (100 kg)

Career information
- High school: Beaver Dam (WI)
- College: North Dakota State
- NFL draft: 1989: 6th round, 156th overall pick

Career history
- Los Angeles Raiders (1989–1990); Houston Oilers (1990–1991)*; Los Angeles Raiders (1991); Green Bay Packers (1991–1992)*
- * Offseason or practice squad member only
- Stats at Pro Football Reference

Doug Lloyd (born August 31, 1965) is an American former college and professional football running back in the National Football League (NFL).

Lloyd attended Beaver Dam High School in Beaver Dam, Wisconsin, and played college football for the North Dakota State Bison football team. In 1988, Lloyd tallied 1,010 rushing yards during the regular season, 1,377 yards including playoff games. He and Chris Simdorn became the first pair of backs to gain more than 1,000 yards each in a season for North Dakota State. He gained an average of 7.1 yards per carry during his career at North Dakota State. He helped lead the undefeated 1988 North Dakota State Bison football team to the Division II national championship, rushing for 115 yards in the team's semifinal win over Sacramento State and 62 yards in the national championship game. At the end of his collegiate career, Mel Kiper Jr. wrote in The Sporting News, "The steady play of Doug Lloyd helped North Dakota State win the NCAA Division II national championship. He is a physically talented 6-1, 217-pounder with sub-4.5 speed and a hard-charging, straight-ahead running style."

He was selected by the Los Angeles Raiders in the sixth round of the 1989 NFL draft. In the 1990 NFL season, he played in all four preseason games for the Raiders before being cut. During the 1991 NFL season, he played in one regular season NFL game for the Raiders, which ended up being his only appearance in the NFL game for his career.
