= Bob Babich (American football coach) =

American football player and coach (born 1961)

Personal information
- Born: February 20, 1961 (age 65); Aliquippa, Pennsylvania, U.S.

Career information
- High school: Aliquippa (PA)
- College: Mesa CC & Tulsa

Career history
- Tulsa (1984) Graduate assistant; Tulsa (1985–1987) Offensive line coach & tight ends coach; Wisconsin (1988–1989) Offensive line coach; Tulsa (1990) Outside linebackers coach; Bowling Green (1991) Inside linebackers coach; East Carolina (1992–1993) Inside linebackers coach; Pittsburgh (1994–1995) Linebackers coach; Pittsburgh (1996) Linebackers coach & special teams coach; North Dakota State (1997–2002) Head coach; St. Louis Rams (2003) Linebackers coach; Chicago Bears (2004–2005) Linebackers coach; Chicago Bears (2006) Assistant head coach & linebackers coach; Chicago Bears (2007–2008) Defensive coordinator; Chicago Bears (2009) Defensive coordinator & linebackers coach; Chicago Bears (2010–2012) Linebackers coach; Jacksonville Jaguars (2013–2015) Defensive coordinator; San Diego Chargers (2016) Linebackers coach; Buffalo Bills (2017–2021) Linebackers coach

Head coaching record
- Regular season: NCAA: 44–20 (.688)
- Postseason: NCAA: 2–2 (.500)
- Career: NCAA: 46–22 (.676)
- Coaching profile at Pro Football Reference

Bob Babich (born February 20, 1961) is an American football coach and former player, who was formerly the linebackers coach for the Buffalo Bills of the National Football League (NFL). Babich was the head football coach at North Dakota State University from 1997 to 2002, compiling a career record of 46–22. He played college football as a linebacker at the University of Tulsa in the early 1980s.

== Early life and playing career ==
Babich was born and raised in Aliquippa, Pennsylvania and he is of Serbian descent. He attended Aliquippa High School, lettering in football and baseball. After graduating in 1979, he played two seasons as a linebacker at Mesa Community College in Mesa, Arizona, before transferring to the University of Tulsa, where he was a letterman on the Golden Hurricane football team from 1981 to 1982.

== Coaching career ==
Babich began his coaching career as a graduate assistant at his alma mater in 1984. The following year, he became a full-time assistant coach, tutoring the tight ends for new head coach Don Morton. Babich coached the team's offensive line and strong safeties the next two seasons, before following Morton to the University of Wisconsin. There he served as an offensive line coach from 1988 to 1989. He returned to Tulsa for one season as a volunteer offensive line coach, followed by another one-year stint at Bowling Green State University, where he coached the inside linebackers. In 1992, Babich joined Steve Logan's staff at East Carolina University in the same capacity. He held that position for two years until moving on to the University of Pittsburgh, serving as linebackers coach under Johnny Majors. During his final season at Pitt, he also handled the special teams. Babich earned his first head coaching position in January 1997, when he was named the head football coach at North Dakota State University.

Babich entered the professional ranks in 2003 with the St. Louis Rams of the National Football League, serving as the team's linebackers coach. The next year, Rams defensive coordinator Lovie Smith was named head coach of the Chicago Bears and took Babich with him. After coaching linebackers during his first three years, he took over the role of defensive coordinator in February 2007, when the Bears decided not to renew the contract of Ron Rivera. Babich spent three seasons in that capacity, until he was returned to his prior position of linebackers coach. On January 17, 2013, Babich was among seven coaches released by new head coach Marc Trestman. In 2017, he was hired as Buffalo Bills linebackers coach. In 2022, Babich announced his retirement, with his son, Bobby Babich, replacing him on the Bills staff.

== Head coaching record ==
Year	Team	Overall	Conference	Standing	Bowl/playoffs
North Dakota State Bison (North Central Conference) (1997–2002)
1997	North Dakota State	9–3	7–2	T–2nd	L NCAA Division II First Round
1998	North Dakota State	7–4	6–3	4th	
1999	North Dakota State	9–2	7–2	3rd	
2000	North Dakota State	12–2	8–1	2nd	L NCAA Division II Semifinal
2001	North Dakota State	7–3	5–3	3rd	
2002	North Dakota State	2–8	1–7	9th	
Total:		46–22			
