= Jim Dick =

American football player (born 1964)

No. 52
- Position: Linebacker

Personal information
- Born: June 18, 1964 (age 62); Great Lakes, Illinois, U.S.
- Listed height: 6 ft 1 in (1.85 m)
- Listed weight: 230 lb (104 kg)

Career information
- High school: Totino-Grace (Fridley, Minnesota)
- College: North Dakota State
- NFL draft: 1987: undrafted

Career history
- Minnesota Vikings (1987)

Career NFL statistics
- Games played: 3
- Games started: 2
- Stats at Pro Football Reference

James Brian Dick (born June 18, 1964) is an American former professional football player who was a linebacker in the National Football League (NFL) for the Minnesota Vikings in 1987. Born in Great Lakes, Illinois, he attended Totino-Grace High School in Fridley, Minnesota, and played college football for the North Dakota State Bison. He was picked up by the Vikings as one of their replacement players during the 1987 NFL strike, and played in three games, starting two of them.

In 1996, Dick was charged but ultimately cleared for theft in a case which saw his parents convicted.
