= Nick DeLuca =

American football player (born 1995)

No. 57, 49
- Position: Linebacker

Personal information
- Born: January 27, 1995 (age 31); Omaha, Nebraska, U.S.
- Listed height: 6 ft 3 in (1.91 m)
- Listed weight: 251 lb (114 kg)

Career information
- High school: Millard North (Omaha)
- College: North Dakota State
- NFL draft: 2018: undrafted

Career history
- Tennessee Titans (2018)*; Jacksonville Jaguars (2018); Miami Dolphins (2019)*; New York Guardians (2020)
- * Offseason or practice squad member only

Awards and highlights
- 4× FCS national champion; Consensus first-team FCS All-American (2017); All-MVFC First-team (2015, 2017)

Career NFL statistics
- Total tackles: 12
- Sacks: 1
- Forced fumbles: 1
- Stats at Pro Football Reference

Nick DeLuca (born January 27, 1995) is an American former professional football player who was a linebacker in the National Football League (NFL). He played college football for the North Dakota State Bison, who won four FCS national championships.

After going back to his alma mater in 2022 to intern for the strength and conditioning program, DeLuca was charged with aggravated assault on October 19, 2023, when he attacked Rienk Mast, a Dutch basketball player on the University of Nebraska campus. DeLuca shoved Mast off of his scooter unprovoked and assaulted him several times, giving him a broken nose.

== Professional career ==
Pre-draft measurables
Height	Weight	Arm length	Hand span	40-yard dash	20-yard shuttle	Three-cone drill	Vertical jump	Broad jump	Bench press
6 ft 2 5/8 in (1.90 m)	251 lb (114 kg)	32 3/4 in (0.83 m)	10 1/4 in (0.26 m)	4.85 s	4.23 s	7.09 s	29.5 in (0.75 m)	9 ft 4 in (2.84 m)	18 reps
All values from NFL Combine

=== Tennessee Titans ===
DeLuca signed with the Tennessee Titans as an undrafted free agent on May 11, 2018. He was waived on August 12, 2018.

=== Jacksonville Jaguars ===
On August 21, 2018, DeLuca was signed by the Jacksonville Jaguars. He was waived on September 1, 2018, and was signed to the practice squad the next day. He was promoted to the active roster on October 22, 2018. On June 13, 2019, the Jaguars cut DeLuca.

=== Miami Dolphins ===
On August 2, 2019, DeLuca signed with the Miami Dolphins. He was waived on August 31, 2019.

=== New York Guardians ===
DeLuca was selected by the New York Guardians in the 25th Round (round five of phase three) of the 2020 XFL draft. He was placed on the reserve/left squad list on February 25, 2020. He had his contract terminated when the league suspended operations on April 10, 2020.
