= Noah Gindorff =

American football player (born 1999)

No. 46
- Position: Tight end

Personal information
- Born: February 12, 1999 (age 27); Crosby, Minnesota, U.S.
- Listed height: 6 ft 6 in (1.98 m)
- Listed weight: 267 lb (121 kg)

Career information
- High school: Crosby-Ironton
- College: North Dakota State (2017–2022)
- NFL draft: 2023: undrafted

Career history
- Seattle Seahawks (2023)*; Pittsburgh Steelers (2023)*
- * Offseason or practice squad member only

Awards and highlights
- 4× FCS national champion (2017–2019, 2021); Second-team All-MVFC (2020)
- Stats at Pro Football Reference

Noah Gindorff (born February 12, 1999) is an American former football player who was a tight end. He played college football for the North Dakota State Bison.

== Early life ==
Gindorff grew up in Crosby, Minnesota, and attended Crosby-Ironton Secondary School. He played quarterback, tight end, defensive line, linebacker, safety, kicker, and holder on the football team, which was coached by his father. During Gindorff's high school career he passed for 2,822 yards and 28 touchdowns and also rushed for 3,318 yards and 43 touchdowns.

== College career ==
Gindorff redshirted his true freshman season at North Dakota State University (NDSU). He played in 12 of the Bison's 15 games, mostly on special teams, during his redshirt freshman season. Gindorff was named second team All-Missouri Valley Football Conference (MVFC) after catching 11 passes for 85 yards and three touchdowns during his redshirt junior season, which was shortened and played in the spring of 2021 due to the COVID-19 pandemic in the United States. He had 17 receptions for 193 yards and two touchdowns in the first 12 games of his redshirt senior season before suffering a season-ending injury. Gindorff decided to utilize the extra year of eligibility granted due to the coronavirus pandemic to college athletes who played in the 2020 season and returned to NDSU for a sixth season. He caught six passes for 74 yards and one touchdown in the first three games of his final season before suffering a season-ending ankle injury.

== Professional career ==
Pre-draft measurables
Height	Weight	Arm length	Hand span	Wingspan	20-yard shuttle	Three-cone drill	Bench press
6 ft 6 in (1.98 m)	263 lb (119 kg)	33 1/8 in (0.84 m)	10 in (0.25 m)	6 ft 8 1/4 in (2.04 m)	4.45 s	7.34 s	20 reps
All values from NFL Combine/Pro Day

On May 12, 2023, Gindorff with the Seattle Seahawks signed as an undrafted free agent. He was waived by the Seahawks on August 17.

On October 4, 2023, Gindorff was signed to the Pittsburgh Steelers practice squad. He was released on October 24.
