= Kole Heckendorf =

American football player and coach (born 1985)

Saint John's Johnnies
- Title: Offensive coordinator & wide receivers coach

Personal information
- Born: November 20, 1985 (age 40); Wausau, Wisconsin, U.S.
- Listed height: 6 ft 2 in (1.88 m)
- Listed weight: 191 lb (87 kg)

Career information
- College: North Dakota State
- NFL draft: 2009: undrafted

Career history

Playing
- Green Bay Packers (2009)*; Detroit Lions (2009)*; Seattle Seahawks (2010)*; San Diego Chargers (2010)*; Indianapolis Colts (2010–2011)
- * Offseason or practice squad member only

Coaching
- Saint John's (MN) (2012–2017) Offensive assistant; Saint John's (MN) (2018–present) Offensive coordinator & wide receivers coach

Awards and highlights
- First-team All-GWFC (2007); Second-team All-MVFC (2008); Second-team All-GWFC (2006)
- Stats at Pro Football Reference

Kole Joseph Heckendorf (born November 20, 1985) is an American college football coach and former wide receiver. He is the offensive coordinator and wide receivers coach for Saint John's University, positions he has held since 2018. After playing college football at North Dakota State, he was signed by the Green Bay Packers as an undrafted free agent in 2009. Heckendorf has also been a member of the Detroit Lions, Seattle Seahawks, San Diego Chargers, and Indianapolis Colts.

== Early life ==
Heckendorf was born in Wausau, Wisconsin where he grew up. He played high school football for Mosinee High School in Mosinee, Wisconsin, as a wide receiver and a safety.

As a junior, Heckendorf was named first-team All-State by the Wisconsin Football Coaches Association (WFCA) and second-team All-State by the Associated Press and the Milwaukee Journal Sentinel after he set state records with 116 receptions for 1,714 yards and 11 touchdowns. He led the nation as a junior with 116 catches.

As a senior, he earned first-team All-State honors from both the Associated Press and the WFCA after making 63 catches for 1,257 yards and recording a state-record 19 touchdowns. He was also named All-Conference and All-District and was a second-team All-State selection by the Milwaukee Journal Sentinel.

His high school career totals of 3,831 yards and 36 touchdowns are state records and his 235 catches rank second all-time.

Heckendorf lettered in hockey all four years of high school, receiving honorable mention all-state honors once and all-conference honors three times. He was a member of an all-star traveling hockey team, Team Wisconsin.

== College career ==
Heckendorf received a scholarship to play college football at North Dakota State University, as a wide receiver, where he finished as the all-time leading receiver in school history and became the first receiver in the history of the program to lead the team in receptions for four seasons.

Heckendorf redshirted in 2004. He had a career-high 52 receptions as a sophomore in 2006. He was named to the All-Northwest Region third-team by the Football Gazette and was voted to the All-GWFC second-team by the league's media after helping NDSU win the conference championship. As a junior, he earned All-Great West Football Conference first-team honors after ranking third in the league in both receptions and yards for the season. He was named a second-team All-Missouri Valley Football Conference selection in 2008. He finished the season ranked third in the conference in yards and fifth in receptions. He had a career day in the 2008 opener against Austin Peay, catching eight passes and notching new career highs of 179 receiving yards and three touchdowns. He made a career-high nine catches at Youngstown State later in the season. He was a member of the ESPN The Magazine Academic All-America first-team as a senior.

Heckendorf earned a B.S. in general education.

== Professional career ==
=== Green Bay Packers ===
Heckendorf was signed by the Green Bay Packers as an undrafted free agent on May 1, 2009, but was released during the pre-season.

=== Detroit Lions ===
On October 12, 2009 Heckendorf was signed to the Detroit Lions' practice squad. After his contract expired following the season, he was re-signed to a future contract on January 5, 2010. He was cut by the Lions on May 11, 2010 and signed to the Seattle Seahawks May 12, 2010.

=== Seattle Seahawks ===
Heckendorf was claimed off waivers by the Seattle Seahawks on May 12, 2010 and released in the preseason on August 30.

=== San Diego Chargers ===
Heckendorf was signed to the San Diego Chargers practice squad on October 13, 2010.

=== Indianapolis Colts ===
Heckendorf joined the Indianapolis Colts practice squad on November 17, 2010. He re-signed on January 12, 2011, was placed on injured reserve on August 8, and was waived from injured reserve on October 17.
