= Gus Bradley =

American football coach (born 1966)

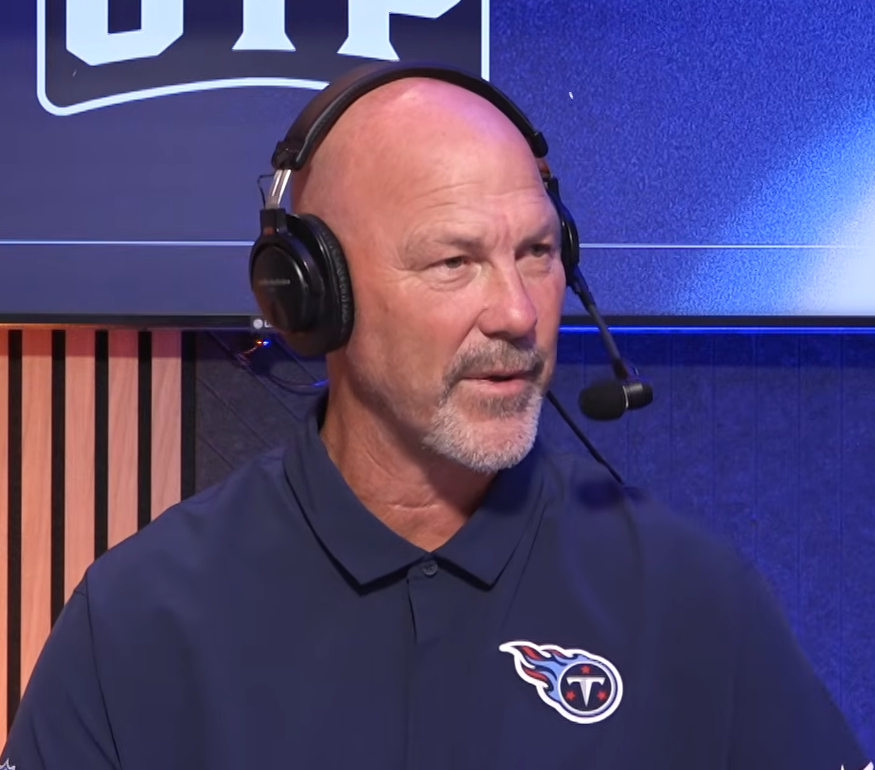
- Bradley with the Tennessee Titans in 2026

Tennessee Titans
- Title: Defensive coordinator

Personal information
- Born: July 5, 1966 (age 60); Zumbrota, Minnesota, U.S.

Career information
- Positions: Safety, Punter
- High school: Zumbrota (MN)
- College: North Dakota State

Career history
- North Dakota State (1990–1991) Graduate assistant; Fort Lewis College (1992–1995) Defensive coordinator & linebackers coach; North Dakota State (1996–2005); Defensive coordinator & linebackers coach (1996–2002); Assistant head coach & linebackers coach (2003–2005); Tampa Bay Buccaneers (2006–2008) Linebackers coach; Seattle Seahawks (2009–2012) Defensive coordinator; Jacksonville Jaguars (2013–2016) Head coach; Los Angeles Chargers (2017–2020) Defensive coordinator; Las Vegas Raiders (2021) Defensive coordinator; Indianapolis Colts (2022–2024) Defensive coordinator; San Francisco 49ers (2025) Assistant head coach; Tennessee Titans (2026–present) Defensive coordinator

Head coaching record
- Regular season: 14–48 (.226)
- Coaching profile at Pro Football Reference

Paul Casey "Gus" Bradley (born July 5, 1966) is an American professional football coach who is the defensive coordinator for the Tennessee Titans of the National Football League (NFL). He came to prominence as the defensive coordinator for the Seattle Seahawks from 2009 to 2012, where he was the original playcaller of the team's Legion of Boom secondary. Bradley later served as the head coach of the Jacksonville Jaguars from 2013 to 2016. After his Jaguars tenure, Bradley was the defensive coordinator for the Los Angeles Chargers, Las Vegas Raiders, and Indianapolis Colts and the assistant head coach for the San Francisco 49ers. He joined the Titans in 2026.

== Early life ==
Paul Casey Bradley was born on July 5, 1966, in Zumbrota, Minnesota. He was the youngest of six children and played football, basketball, and baseball at Zumbrota High School.

== College career ==
Bradley played college football at North Dakota State University from 1984 to 1988, where he was a free safety and punter. Bradley helped the Bison win the NCAA Division II Football Championship in 1984, 1987, and 1988. He was also a four-time academic all-North Central Conference selection.

Bradley earned bachelor's degrees in business administration (1989) and physical education (1990) from North Dakota State as well as a master's degree in athletic administration from NDSU in 1992.

== Coaching career ==
=== Early coaching career ===
Bradley joined the North Dakota State Bison as a graduate assistant coach in 1990 and was there until 1991. He was the defensive coordinator/linebackers coach at Fort Lewis College from 1992 to 1995 and was their head coach from December 1995 to March 1996.

From 1996 to 2005, Bradley returned to North Dakota State and coached in many positions including defensive coordinator, linebackers coach, and assistant head coach to Bob Babich and Craig Bohl. Under Bradley's guidance, North Dakota State's defense led the Great West Football Conference in scoring defense (13.7 ppg), pass defense (150.3 ypg), total defense (272.4 ypg) and turnover margin (+1.00) in 2005.

=== Tampa Bay Buccaneers ===
In 2006, Bradley joined the Tampa Bay Buccaneers as their defensive quality control coach, working closely with defensive coordinator Monte Kiffin in the organization and implementation of the defensive game plan.

In 2007, Bradley was promoted to linebackers coach after previous linebackers coach Joe Barry left to become defensive coordinator for the Detroit Lions. Under Bradley's guidance, linebacker Barrett Ruud went on to earn NFC Defensive Player of the Month in September after leading the Buccaneers defense with 51 tackles, an interception, three forced fumbles, two fumble recoveries, and two pass deflections.

=== Seattle Seahawks ===
J.L., listen to me. I have got a guy here in Tampa that is one of, if not, the finest football coaches I have ever worked with. He's an A-plus. He's a once-in-a-lifetime coach. You need to talk to him.

— Monte Kiffin, to Jim L. Mora in 2009 about Bradley, after Mora was hired as Seahawks head coach.

On January 12, 2009, the Seattle Seahawks hired Bradley to become the team's defensive coordinator. He was recommended for the job by former Buccaneers defensive coordinator Monte Kiffin.

In 2009, under Bradley's guidance, the Seahawks' defense allowed opponents to gain 356.4 yards (24th in the league) and to score 24.4 points per game (25th). The Seahawks finished the season with a 5–11 record and subsequently replaced head coach Jim L. Mora with Pete Carroll. Carroll decided to keep Bradley for the 2010 season; the two coaches have a common connection with Kiffin.

In 2010, the Seahawks' defense allowed opponents to gain 368.6 yards (27th in the league) and to score 25.4 points per game (25th).

In 2011, the Seahawks' defense allowed opponents to gain 332.2 yards (9th in the league) and to score 19.7 points per game (7th).

In 2012, the Seahawks' defense allowed opponents to gain 306.2 yards per game (4th in the league) and to score 15.3 points per game (1st).

=== Jacksonville Jaguars ===
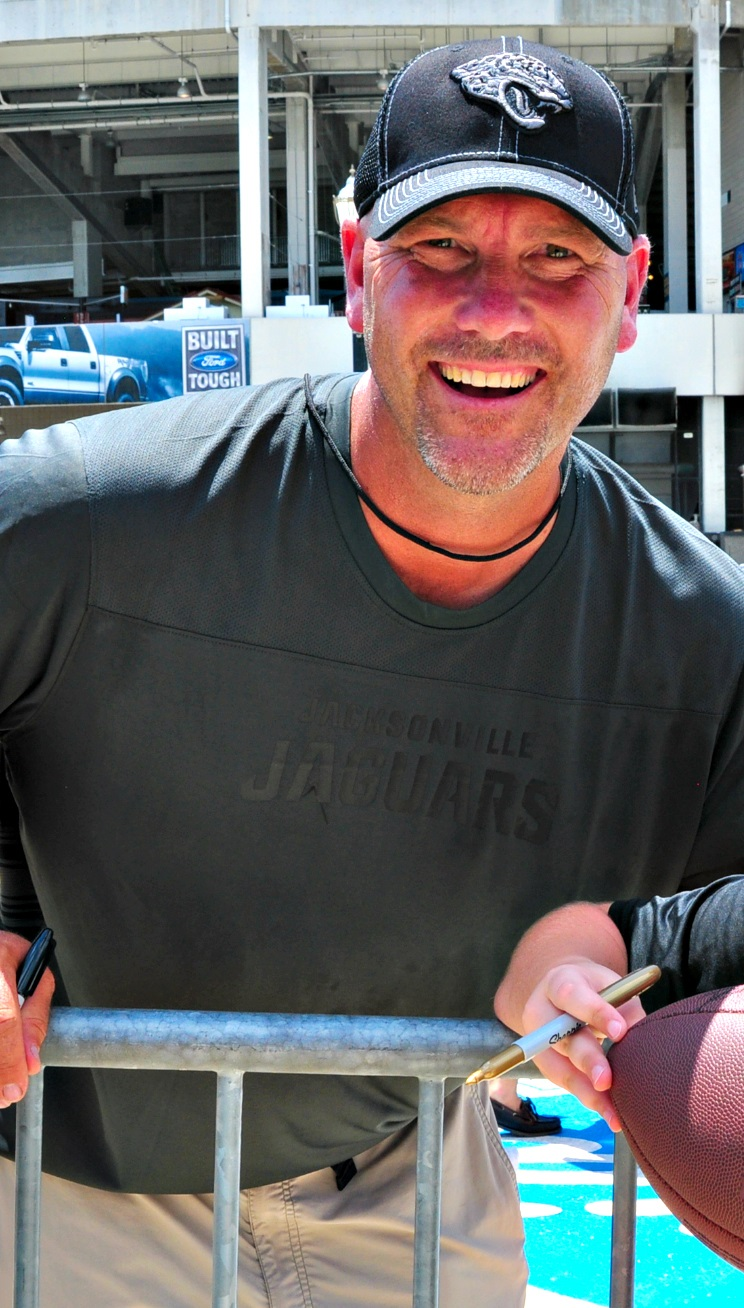
Bradley in 2014

On January 17, 2013, Bradley was hired as the new head coach of the Jacksonville Jaguars. His first regular season win came in Week 10 as the Jaguars narrowly defeated the Tennessee Titans by a score of 29–27. The Jaguars finished the season with a 4–12 record, and Bradley was eventually named the head coach of the South team in the 2014 Senior Bowl.

On December 18, 2016, the Jaguars relieved Bradley of his duties as head coach, compiling a 14–48 record in less than four seasons.

=== Los Angeles Chargers ===
On January 20, 2017, the Los Angeles Chargers hired Bradley as defensive coordinator under head coach Anthony Lynn.

After the defense allowed 17 points per game, the third-fewest in the NFL, Bradley received a three-year contract extension after the 2017 season.

=== Las Vegas Raiders ===
On January 12, 2021, Bradley was hired by the Las Vegas Raiders to be their defensive coordinator under head coach Jon Gruden, replacing Paul Guenther, who was fired during the 2020 season.

=== Indianapolis Colts ===
On February 4, 2022, Bradley was hired by the Indianapolis Colts as their defensive coordinator under head coach Frank Reich.

On March 7, 2023, after Reich was fired and Bradley's defense struggled, the Colts announced that they would be retaining Bradley as defensive coordinator under newly hired head coach Shane Steichen. Notably, Steichen and Bradley worked together during their time with the Los Angeles Chargers.

On January 11, 2024, Colts general manager Chris Ballard announced that Bradley would again return for the 2024 NFL season, after the Colts defense struggled in some areas but ranked 5th in sacks (51), 16th in takeaways (24), but just 28th in points (24.4) during the 2023 NFL season. On January 6, 2025, after a long and difficult year in which Bradley’s defense ranked bottom five in most categories, the Colts announced they had fired Bradley after three years as defensive coordinator.

=== San Francisco 49ers ===
On February 25, 2025, the San Francisco 49ers hired Bradley as their assistant head coach, reuniting with his old friend and former assistant at Jacksonville, Robert Saleh, who served as the team's defensive coordinator. Bradley’s role with the 49ers was to assist both Saleh and head coach Kyle Shanahan, game plan, and make key defensive decisions.

=== Tennessee Titans ===
On February 4, 2026, the Tennessee Titans hired Bradley to be their new defensive coordinator under new head coach Robert Saleh after the pair of them spent the 2025 season together with the 49ers.

== Head coaching record ==
Team	Year	Regular season					Postseason			
Team	Year	Won	Lost	Ties	Win %	Finish	Won	Lost	Win %	Result
JAX	2013	4	12	0	.250	3rd in AFC South	–	–	–	–
JAX	2014	3	13	0	.188	3rd in AFC South	–	–	–	–
JAX	2015	5	11	0	.313	3rd in AFC South	–	–	–	–
JAX	2016	2	12	0	.143	Fired	–	–	–	–
Total		14	48	0	.226		0	0	.000	

== Personal life ==
Bradley's son, Carter, was the starting quarterback for the South Alabama Jaguars from 2022 to 2023 and played for the Las Vegas Raiders in 2024.
