= John Crockett (gridiron football) =

American football player (born 1992)

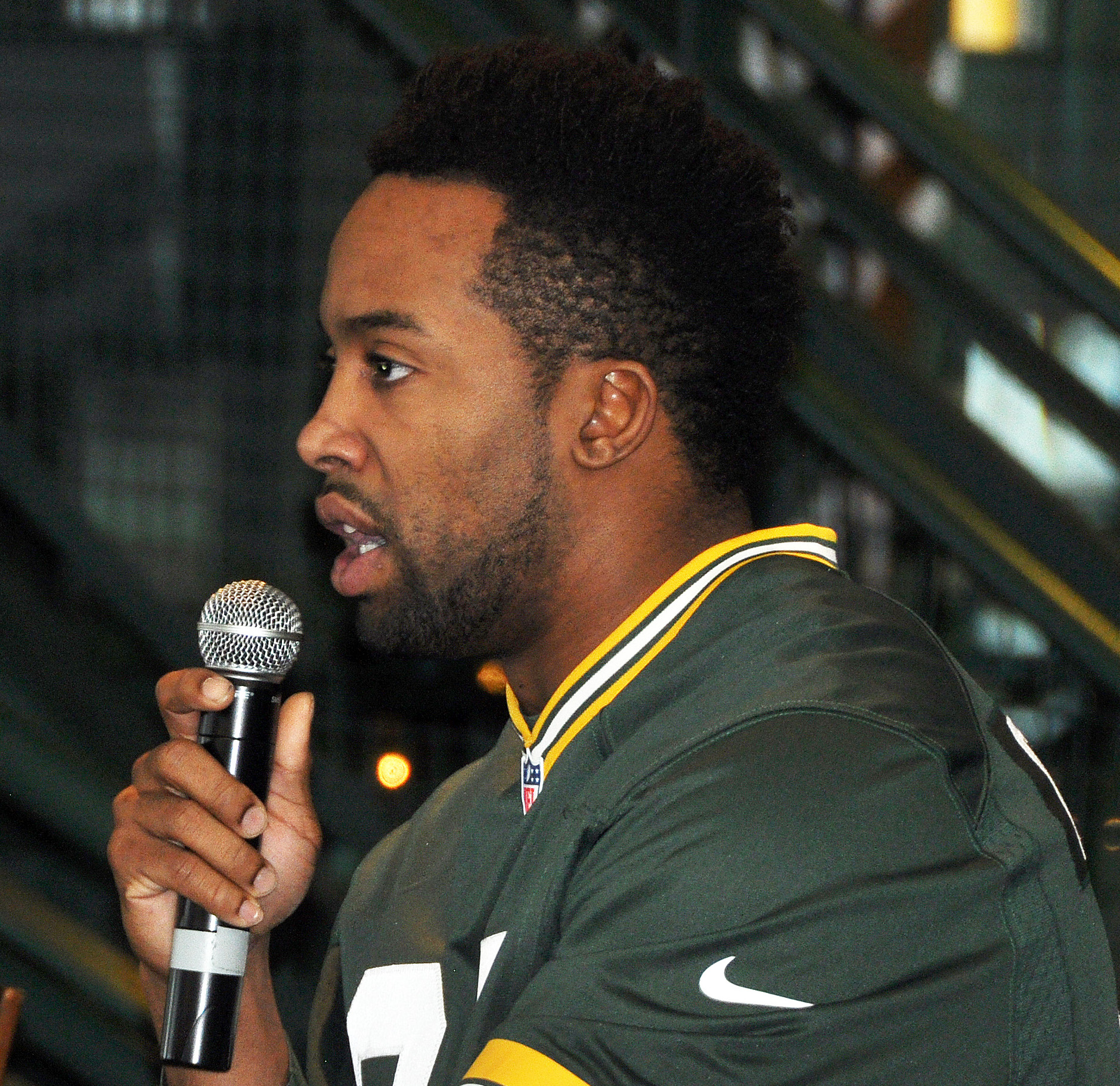
- Crockett with the Green Bay Packers in 2015

No. 23, 32, 38, 43, 45
- Position: Running back

Personal information
- Born: February 16, 1992 (age 34); Minneapolis, Minnesota, U.S.
- Listed height: 6 ft 0 in (1.83 m)
- Listed weight: 217 lb (98 kg)

Career information
- High school: Totino-Grace (Fridley, Minnesota)
- College: North Dakota State (2012–2014)
- NFL draft: 2015: undrafted

Career history
- Green Bay Packers (2015–2016); Oakland Raiders (2017)*; Baltimore Ravens (2017–2018)*; Arizona Hotshots (2019)*; Ottawa Redblacks (2019–2020)
- * Offseason or practice squad member only

Awards and highlights
- 3× FCS national champion (2012–2014)

Career NFL statistics
- Rushing attempts: 9
- Rushing yards: 21
- Rushing touchdowns: 0
- Stats at Pro Football Reference

Career CFL statistics
- Rushing attempts: 74
- Rushing yards: 403
- Rushing touchdowns: 0
- Stats at CFL.ca

John C. Crockett (born February 16, 1992) is an American former professional football player who was a running back in the National Football League (NFL) and Canadian Football League (CFL). He played college football for the North Dakota State Bison. Crockett was signed by the Green Bay Packers as an undrafted free agent in 2015.

== College career ==
Crockett attended North Dakota State University, where he played for the Bison from 2012 to 2014.

=== Statistics ===
Season	Team	Games		Rushing					Receiving				
Season	Team	GP	GS	Att	Yds	Avg	Lng	TD	Rec	Yds	Avg	Lng	TD
2012	NDSU	15	1	194	1,038	5.4	57	9	7	54	7.7	19	0
2013	NDSU	15	0	190	1,277	6.7	71	11	6	34	5.7	13	0
2014	NDSU	16	16	368	1,994	5.4	80	21	30	397	13.2	40	1
Total		46	17	752	4,309	5.7	80	41	43	485	11.3	40	1
Source: GoBison.com

== Professional career ==
External videos
- Crockett's NFL Combine workout

Pre-draft measurables
Height	Weight	Arm length	Hand span	40-yard dash	10-yard split	20-yard split	20-yard shuttle	Three-cone drill	Vertical jump	Broad jump	Bench press
5 ft 11 3/4 in (1.82 m)	217 lb (98 kg)	31 in (0.79 m)	9 3/4 in (0.25 m)	4.62 s	1.54 s	2.68 s	4.25 s	7.15 s	40 in (1.02 m)	10 ft 5 in (3.18 m)	15 reps
All values are from NFL Combine

=== Green Bay Packers ===
After going undrafted in the 2015 NFL draft, Crockett signed with the Green Bay Packers on May 8, 2015. On September 5, he was released by the Packers during final team cuts. Crockett was re-signed to the Packers' practice squad on September 7. On December 3, he was promoted from the practice squad to the active roster. Crockett made his NFL debut against the Detroit Lions in Week 13. He finished the game with 5 rushes for 22 yards in the Packers' 27–23 miracle victory in Detroit. Crockett saw his first playoff action on January 10, 2016 in the Packers' wildcard playoff game against the Washington Redskins, playing on special teams.

On August 30, 2016, Crockett was placed on injured reserve.

=== Oakland Raiders ===
Crockett was signed by the Oakland Raiders on July 14, 2017. He was waived by the team on September 2.

=== Baltimore Ravens ===
On September 21, 2017, Crockett was signed to the Baltimore Ravens' practice squad. He signed a reserve/future contract with the Ravens on January 1, 2018. Crockett was released by the Ravens on May 2.

=== Arizona Hotshots ===
Crockett signed with the Arizona Hotshots of the Alliance of American Football for the 2019 season, but was placed on injured reserve before the start of the season on January 30, 2019. He was waived from injured reserve on February 22.

=== Ottawa Redblacks ===
Crockett was released by the Ottawa Redblacks on February 5, 2021.

=== NFL career statistics ===
Year	Team	Games		Rushing					Fumbles	
Year	Team	GP	GS	Att	Yds	Avg	Lng	TD	Fum	Lost
2015	GB	2	0	9	21	2.3	12	0	0	0
Total		2	0	9	21	2.3	12	0	0	0
Source: NFL.com
