= Tyler Roehl =

American football player and coach (born 1986)

Iowa State Cyclones
- Title: Offensive coordinator

Personal information
- Born: January 29, 1986 (age 40); West Fargo, North Dakota, U.S.

Career information
- Position: Running back
- High school: West Fargo
- College: North Dakota State (2004–2008)
- NFL draft: 2009: undrafted

Career history

Playing
- Seattle Seahawks (2009)

Coaching
- Concordia (MN) (2010) Running backs coach; North Dakota State (2011) Graduate assistant; Moorhead HS (MN) (2012–2013) Assistant; North Dakota State (2014–2018) Running backs coach & tight ends coach; North Dakota State (2019–2023) Offensive coordinator, tight ends coach & fullbacks coach; Iowa State (2024) Assistant head coach & running backs coach; Detroit Lions (2025) Tight ends coach; Iowa State (2026–present) Offensive coordinator

Awards and highlights
- As assistant: 7× FCS national champion (2011, 2014, 2015, 2017–2019, 2021)

Tyler Roehl (born January 29, 1986) is an American football coach and former running back who is currently the offensive coordinator at Iowa State. He was signed by the Seattle Seahawks as an undrafted free agent in 2009. He played college football for the North Dakota State Bison. In June 2009, he was placed on the Waived/Injured list. In May 2010, he participated in the Minnesota Vikings rookie mini-camp. Roehl tried out for the United Football League Las Vegas Locomotives. Roehl was hired as the tight ends and fullbacks coach at his alma mater, North Dakota State, for 2014 season.

== Early life ==
Roehl was born and raised in West Fargo, North Dakota where he played high school football for the West Fargo Packers as a running back and linebacker. One of the most productive players in North Dakota high school history, he was a two-time first team All-State, two-time first team All-EDC and two-time team MVP. Tyler was a big reason why the Packers won back to back state championships in 2002 and 2003 as he was the game MVP in both title games.

Roehl ran for 1,269 yards, 25 touchdowns, and averaged 8.7 yards per carry on offense and also had 51 tackles and three interceptions on defense as a senior. This led to Tyler becoming the Class AAA Player of the Year in North Dakota in 2003. He also holds the team record for total points scored with 290.

Roehl also excelled in baseball where he was a four-time letter winner and an All-EDC performer in 2004.

== College career ==
Roehl received a scholarship to play college football at North Dakota State University, as a running back.

As a freshman, Roehl played in all 11 games for the Bison. However, he was primarily used as a blocking back. Roehl only carried the ball twice for 14 yards that season.

Roehl was redshirted the following year because he broke his leg during a spring practice in 2005.

As a sophomore, Roehl started in 10 of 11 games. Roehl became more of a threat out of the backfield with 22 receptions for 259 yards and one touchdown and averaged 11.8 yards per reception. Roehl made a season-high five receptions for 70 yards in 31–7 win at Southern Utah on October 28, 2006. Roehl also reeled off a 41-yard catch in the 29–24 win over Ball State on September 23, 2006. Roehl made his first touchdown catch against Mississippi Valley State on October 14, 2006. However, Roehl only rushed seven times for 14 yards and one touchdown.

Roehl's junior year was huge success for him. Roehl started in 10 games played and racked up 1,431 yards and 21 touchdowns on 207 carries and averaged 6.9 yards per carry. Roehl also had 20 receptions for 180 yards. Roehl became just the third North Dakota State football player to earn CoSIDA Academic All-America first team honors and was also named to the Associated Press, The Sports Network and Dopke College Sports Report.com FCS All-America second teams. Roehl was an All-Great West Football Conference first team selection by coaches and media and was also a four-time GWFC Offensive Player of the Week. Tyler led the Great West in rushing, scoring and all-purpose yards that year. Roehl's biggest achievement was his three games with 200-plus yards including 238 yards and 3 touchdowns on 27 carries in the season opener against Stephen F. Austin on September 8, 2007, 263 yards on 22 carries against Minnesota on October 20, 2007, including 77 yard touchdown run to earn an ESPN College Gameday helmet sticker and USA Today Player of the Week, and 257 yards and four touchdowns vs. Illinois State. Tyler also recorded six games with 100-yards rushing and scored at least two touchdowns in six games that year.

Roehl's senior year was just as productive as the previous year. He was Sporting News' College Football preseason All-American Team. He finished the season with 1,053 yards and 13 touchdowns on 171 carries and averaged 6.2 yards per carry. He also caught 13 passes for 101 yards.

=== College statistics ===
In the 2005 season, Roehl was redshirted because of a broken leg suffered during a spring practice his freshman year.

		Rushing							Receiving			
Season	Team	GP	Att	Yds	Avg	Yds/G	Long	TD	Rec	Yds	Long	TD
2004	NDSU	11	2	14	7.0	1.3	11	0	0	0	0	0
2005	NDSU	0	0	0	0	0	0	0	0	0	0	0
2006	NDSU	11	8	14	1.8	1.3	4	1	22	259	41	1
2007	NDSU	10	207	1,431	6.9	143.1	81	21	20	180	30	0
2008	NDSU	11	171	1,053	6.2	95.7	80	13	13	101	31	0
	Career Total	43	388	2,512	6.5	58.4	81	35	56	540	41	1

== Professional career ==
Roehl was signed by the Seattle Seahawks as an undrafted free agent on April 26, 2009. During an offseason workout on June 1, 2009, Roehl suffered a torn anterior cruciate ligament on his left knee which subsequently ended his season. His was placed on the injured/waived list for that season. He was released by the Seahawks on March 15, 2010.

== Coaching career ==
Roehl spent the 2010 season as the running backs coach and junior varsity offensive coordinator at Concordia College in Moorhead. He was NDSU's offensive graduate assistant in 2011. Roehl spent two years on the Moorhead High School football staff. He returned to his alma mater as the tight ends and fullbacks coach in January 2014.

=== North Dakota State ===
Roehl began his coaching career as an offensive graduate assistant at North Dakota State in 2011, helping the Bison secure their first FCS national title. He returned in 2014 as the tight ends and fullbacks coach and was promoted to offensive coordinator in 2019. Under his leadership, the Bison ranked among the top rushing offenses in the FCS, winning national titles in 2019 and 2021. His offenses consistently led the nation in rushing touchdowns and total yards, and he coached multiple All-Americans, including quarterback Trey Lance, the 2019 Walter Payton Award winner.

=== Iowa State ===
Roehl joined Iowa State as assistant head coach and running backs coach in 2024. His impact was immediate, helping the Cyclones improve their rushing touchdowns from 13 in 2023 to 27 in 2024. Iowa State finished 11–3, reaching the Big 12 Championship Game, and won the Pop-Tarts Bowl. Running back Carson Hansen thrived under Roehl, scoring 13 rushing touchdowns, the first non-QB to do so since 2005.

=== Detroit Lions ===
On February 11, 2025, the Detroit Lions hired Roehl as their tight ends coach. Roehl first crossed paths with Lions head coach Dan Campbell at North Dakota State's Pro Day for Trey Lance. Through that initial meeting, the two have stayed in connection ever since.

=== Iowa State (second stint) ===
On December 22, 2025, it was announced that Roehl would be returning to Iowa State as the program's new offensive coordinator.
