= Dacotah Field =

Multi-use field in Fargo, North Dakota

Coordinates: 46°54′1″N 96°48′2″W

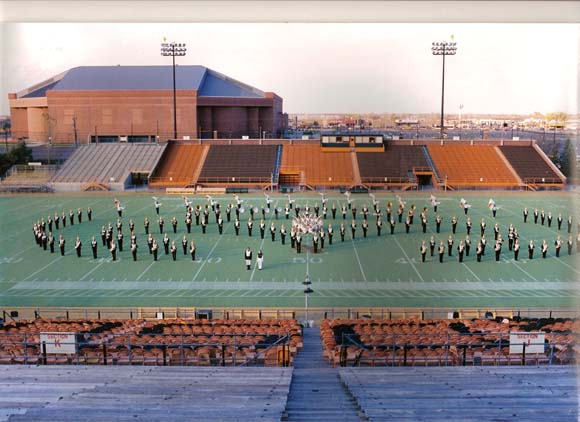
- Gold Star Marching Band practicing on Dacotah Field in the 1990s; Fargodome in the background

- Location in the United States Location in North Dakota
- Interactive map of Dacotah Field
- Address: 1310 17th Ave N
- Location: North Dakota State University; Fargo, North Dakota, U.S.
- Owner: North Dakota State University
- Capacity: 2,600
- Surface: Artificial turf (2017)

Construction
- Groundbreaking: 1938
- Opened: 1938; 88 years ago Moved to North Campus: 1955; 71 years ago Renovation: 2013; 13 years ago
- Cost: Initial Renovation: $1 million ($1.38 million in 2025)

Tenants
- North Dakota State Bison football (NCAA) (1910–1992); North Dakota State Bison women's soccer (NCAA) (2013–present)

Dacotah Field is an outdoor stadium in the north central United States, on the campus of North Dakota State University (NDSU) in Fargo, North Dakota. It is the former home of the North Dakota State Bison football team, and the current home of the North Dakota State Bison women's soccer team. The field runs east-west at an approximate elevation of 900 feet (275 m) above sea level.

Dacotah Field opened in 1910, north of Festive Hall on campus. A quarter-mile cinder track and a 7,000-seat stadium were added in 1938 as part of one of the federal government's Works Progress Administration (WPA) construction projects; it had a final seating capacity of 13,000.

The field moved farther north in 1949 to its present location, completed in time for the 1950 season. A 1952 fire destroyed two-thirds of the north stands but, in 1972, the remaining wooden bleachers were replaced with a new 7,000-seat grandstand, courtesy of the New England Patriots. NDSU won its final game at Dacotah Field in 1992 and still uses the turf for practice and high school games. In 1993, the team moved to the 18,700-seat Fargodome, adjacent to the north.

In 2013, the NDSU women's soccer team moved from Ellig Sports Complex to Dacotah Field. Major renovations were completed prior to the move, including new bleacher seating, lighting, sound system, and scoreboard; its seating capacity was reduced to 2,600 during the renovations.

In 2014, a $1 million project added a bubble to enable year-round use as a multi-use event and practice facility. The air-supported structure hosted its first football practice on December 1, and new artificial turf was installed in the summer of 2017.

In 2022, after the completion of the nearby NoDak Insurance Football Performance Complex that is just south of Dacotah Field and the Scheels Center, the NDSU football team ceased year-round use of the field and the bubble was permanently taken down. A new scoreboard on the west side of the field was installed back in 2021 for sole use by the NDSU women's soccer team.
