= Nickel Trophy =

American college football rivalry

- North Dakota Fighting Hawks North Dakota State Bison
- Sport: Football
- First meeting: November 3, 1894; North Dakota Agricultural 20, North Dakota 4
- Latest meeting: November 8, 2025; North Dakota State 15, North Dakota 10
- Stadiums: Fargodome; Alerus Center
- Trophy: None (formerly the Nickel Trophy)

Statistics
- Total meetings: 118
- All-time series: North Dakota leads 63–52–3
- Largest victory: North Dakota State, 64–14 (1969)
- Longest win streak: North Dakota, 12 (1953–1964); North Dakota State, 12 (1981–1992)
- Current win streak: North Dakota State, 2 (2024–present)

Locations of North Dakota and North Dakota State

The Nickel Trophy is a trophy that was presented to the winner of the annual football game between the rival University of North Dakota (UND) Fighting Hawks and the North Dakota State University (NDSU) Bison. The two universities are approximately 76 miles apart on the eastern border of North Dakota. The two schools suspended play in 2003 before meeting again in 2015, with annual games resuming between 2019 and 2025. With NDSU's move to FBS in 2026, the series is unlikely to continue on any regular basis. In the entire history of the rivalry, the game has never been contested anywhere beside Grand Forks or Fargo.

== The Trophy ==
Robert Kunkel, a UND alumnus and Chicago advertising executive, was the originator of the trophy, and Blue Key, an honorary service fraternity at NDSU, and the UND Blue Key (Student Government after their Blue Key Chapter dissolved) administered the annual awarding. It is an oversized 75-pound replica of the James Earle Fraser-designed U.S. buffalo nickel with a buffalo on one side representing NDSU Bison and a Native American head on the other side representing UND, who were known as the Fighting Sioux until 2012. Fraser, best known for his sculpture, "The End of The Trail", was born in Winona, MN and lived for a time in Dakota Territory. The coin-shaped trophy's "mint" date is 1937, the year the trophy was created. Jack Sather, a native of New England, ND, was commissioned to design and act a sculpture of the award. It took six weeks to complete the job and he was paid $1,650 for his work. Those funds were raised by both NDSU and UND Blue Key chapters from members and friends. The Nickel, at 250 times larger than a regular five-cent piece, weighs 75 pounds and is 2 inches thick and 22 inches in diameter. Both sides were 3/4" relief and, from the original models, plaster casts were poured. The casts were hauled to a St. Paul, MN foundry where plaster copies were recast in an aluminum alloy. The halves were welded together to make the finished piece. It was first awarded in 1938 when NDSU won 17–13. It has been the object of many theft and "kidnapping" attempts by students from both universities. Governor William Langer was asked to participate in the unveiling of the new award in Grand Forks. Moments after the unveiling an unidentified student stepped up to Governor Langer, told him "I'll take care of this for you", and disappeared with the nickel trophy. It turned up 36 hours later on the front lawn of then UND President John C. West (The Forum of Fargo-Moorhead, October 21, 1967) and a new tradition of "kidnapping" or "borrowing" the trophy had begun. The trophy retired after the 2003 season. While the rivalry was renewed in 2015, the trophy remained retired and is currently displayed at the North Dakota Heritage Center in Bismarck.

== History ==
Nickel Trophy
- The Nickel Trophy – NDSU side
- Awarded for: Winning the regular season NDSU/UND football game
- Sponsored by: NDSU Blue Key & UND Student Government
- Date: 1938–2003
- Location: Fargo, ND or Grand Forks, ND
- Country: United States
- Currently held by: State Historical Society of North Dakota

Prior to 2004, the game was one of the most played college football contests, with 110 meetings spanning several decades with the first official game in 1894. UND leads the all-time series 62–50, with 3 ties. In games where the Nickel Trophy has been contested (since 1938), UND leads the series 35-30. The last NDSU win in a game in which the trophy was at stake was in 2000, 16–13. The two playoff games between the teams (1994 and 1995) are not considered part of the Nickel series, and it has been agreed on by both schools that only the regular season scheduled game would determine the Nickel's rightful owner according to former Blue Key member and chapter adviser Tim Flakoll. The Nickel Trophy was not at stake in 2015 (a game won 34–9 by the Bison) due to the now-abandoned Sioux logo remaining on one side.

Both teams have had long winning streaks in the series. The most recent streaks of significant length were in 1981–1992, where the Bison won 12 straight games in the series, including two shutout wins (1985 and 1989)- and in 1993–1996, where the then-Fighting Sioux snapped the losing streak by winning four straight regular-season games. (As mentioned, the two teams did play playoff games in 1994 and 1995 respectively—the Sioux winning in 1994 and the Bison in 1995). Of more historical relevance, UND had won 12 straight from 1953-1964 before the Bison snapped that streak with a 6-3 victory at Fargo in 1965.

Since 1921, NDSU and UND competed as charter members in the NCAA Division II North Central Conference. In 2002, NDSU announced their intention to move their football program to the Division I-AA level (and athletic program as a whole to Division I). Following NDSU's reclassification, agreement for the schools to continue competing on the field could not be reached between the two universities due to UND's athletic department. Thus the series went on indefinite hiatus after the 2003 season. In mid-2006, UND announced their intention to move their athletic programs to Division I as well and the 2008 season was their first in Division I, opening the door for the rivalry to restart. However, while North Dakota State were members of the Missouri Valley Football Conference in football, and the Summit League in non-football sports. North Dakota joined the Big Sky Conference, complicating the matter for scheduling future games.

Scheduling logistics with their respective conferences and the yearly frequency of the potential resumption of the series were the stated reasons for not resuming. Several high-profile alumni and sports figures had called for a resumption of the series, and a grassroots movement from for the legislature to require an annual game by law.

On December 12, 2010, The Bison hosted North Dakota in men's basketball at the Fargodome in front of an NDSU basketball record crowd of 10,709 for the first athletic meeting between the two schools as Division I opponents.

On May 16, 2012, UND athletic director Brian Faison announced that UND and NDSU had been planning a contract for two more games between each other, both in Fargo in 2015 and 2019. On August 22, 2014, UND athletics announced the signing of the contract for two games against NDSU to be played in Fargo on September 19, 2015, and September 7, 2019. On September 9, 2015 #2 ranked NDSU hosted the newly rebranded Fighting Hawks in the first Nickel Trophy matchup in 12 years. The game, which the Bison won 34-9, received ample media attention as the long-running series returned. On January 26, 2017, North Dakota announced that they would move to the Summit League for non-football for the 2018 season, and football-only Missouri Valley Football Conference for the 2020 season. The UND–NDSU matchup became a conference rivalry in non-football sports once again in 2018 when the Fighting Hawks joined the Summit League, and became a conference football rivalry in 2020 when UND and NDSU were reunited in the MVFC.

On October 15, 2023, UND claimed their first victory in the series since October 18, 2003, and their first in the Division I era.

With NDSU's move to FBS in the Mountain West Conference in 2026, the future of the rivalry game is uncertain, as NDSU will likely only play one FCS opponent per season, and only in Fargo.

== Game results ==
North Dakota victories	North Dakota State victories	Tie games

No.	Date	Location	Winner	Score
1	November 3, 1894	Grand Forks, ND	North Dakota Agricultural	20–4
2	November 12, 1894	Fargo, ND	North Dakota Agricultural	24–4
3	November 4, 1895	Grand Forks, ND	North Dakota	42–0
4	November 9, 1895	Fargo, ND	North Dakota Agricultural	12–4
5	October 28, 1896	Grand Forks, ND	North Dakota	58–12
6	October 30, 1897	Fargo, ND	North Dakota	39–0
7	November 15, 1897	Grand Forks, ND	North Dakota	20–0
8	November 8, 1898	Fargo, ND	North Dakota	39–6
9	November 11, 1899	Grand Forks, ND	North Dakota	46–0
10	November 19, 1900	Fargo, ND	North Dakota Agricultural	16–0
11	November 2, 1901	Grand Forks, ND	North Dakota Agricultural	17–11
12	November 8, 1902	Grand Forks, ND	North Dakota Agricultural	47–0
13	November 5, 1904	Fargo, ND	North Dakota	22–0
14	November 7, 1904	Grand Forks, ND	North Dakota	17–0
15	October 21, 1905	Grand Forks, ND	North Dakota	23–5
16	November 18, 1905	Fargo, ND	Tie	11–11
17	October 27, 1906	Fargo, ND	North Dakota Agricultural	32–4
18	November 5, 1910	Grand Forks, ND	North Dakota	18–0
19	November 2, 1912	Grand Forks, ND	North Dakota	3–0
20	November 1, 1913	Fargo, ND	North Dakota	20–14
21	November 7, 1914	Grand Forks, ND	North Dakota Agricultural	7–6
22	November 6, 1915	Fargo, ND	North Dakota	20–0
23	November 4, 1916	Grand Forks, ND	North Dakota	10–0
24	November 3, 1917	Fargo, ND	North Dakota Agricultural	20–6
25	November 1, 1919	Grand Forks, ND	North Dakota Agricultural	7–6
26	October 30, 1920	Fargo, ND	North Dakota	14–7
27	October 29, 1921	Grand Forks, ND	North Dakota	38–3
28	November 4, 1922	Fargo, ND	North Dakota	7–0
29	October 27, 1923	Grand Forks, ND	North Dakota	10–3
30	November 1, 1924	Fargo, ND	North Dakota Agricultural	20–7
31	October 31, 1925	Grand Forks, ND	North Dakota Agricultural	19–10
32	November 6, 1926	Grand Forks, ND	North Dakota	7–6
33	October 29, 1927	Grand Forks, ND	North Dakota	13–0
34	October 27, 1928	Fargo, ND	North Dakota	18–0
35	October 25, 1929	Grand Forks, ND	North Dakota	14–0
36	October 25, 1930	Fargo, ND	North Dakota	14–7
37	October 31, 1931	Grand Forks, ND	North Dakota	20–12
38	October 22, 1932	Fargo, ND	North Dakota Agricultural	7–6
39	October 28, 1933	Grand Forks, ND	Tie	7–7
40	October 27, 1934	Fargo, ND	North Dakota Agricultural	7–0
41	October 26, 1935	Grand Forks, ND	Tie	20–20
42	October 31, 1936	Fargo, ND	North Dakota	14–0
43	October 30, 1937	Grand Forks, ND	North Dakota	27–0
44	October 29, 1938	Fargo, ND	North Dakota Agricultural	17–13
45	October 28, 1939	Grand Forks, ND	North Dakota	18–0
46	October 26, 1940	Fargo, ND	North Dakota	24–0
47	October 25, 1941	Grand Forks, ND	North Dakota	20–6
48	October 24, 1942	Fargo, ND	North Dakota Agricultural	26–14
49	October 20, 1945	Grand Forks, ND	North Dakota	20–12
50	October 27, 1945	Fargo, ND	North Dakota Agricultural	26–7
51	October 19, 1946	Grand Forks, ND	North Dakota Agricultural	31–0
52	October 18, 1947	Fargo, ND	North Dakota	25–20
53	October 30, 1948	Grand Forks, ND	North Dakota Agricultural	19–7
54	October 29, 1949	Fargo, ND	North Dakota	13–6
55	October 28, 1950	Grand Forks, ND	North Dakota	33–0
56	October 27, 1951	Fargo, ND	North Dakota	33–14
57	October 25, 1952	Grand Forks, ND	North Dakota Agricultural	14–13
58	October 31, 1953	Fargo, ND	North Dakota	26–6
59	October 30, 1954	Grand Forks, ND	North Dakota	40–7
60	October 29, 1955	Fargo, ND	North Dakota	21–0

No.	Date	Location	Winner	Score
61	October 20, 1956	Grand Forks, ND	North Dakota	14–7
62	October 19, 1957	Fargo, ND	North Dakota	9–0
63	October 18, 1958	Grand Forks, ND	North Dakota	36–0
64	October 17, 1959	Fargo, ND	North Dakota	20–15
65	October 15, 1960	Grand Forks, ND	North Dakota	16–7
66	October 21, 1961	Fargo, ND	North Dakota	26–6
67	October 20, 1962	Grand Forks, ND	North Dakota	30–7
68	October 19, 1963	Fargo, ND	North Dakota	21–7
69	October 17, 1964	Grand Forks, ND	North Dakota	20–13
70	October 16, 1965	Fargo, ND	North Dakota State	6–3
71	October 22, 1966	Grand Forks, ND	North Dakota State	18–15
72	October 21, 1967	Fargo, ND	North Dakota State	34–10
73	October 19, 1968	Grand Forks, ND	North Dakota State	14–8
74	October 18, 1969	Fargo, ND	North Dakota State	64–14
75	October 17, 1970	Grand Forks, ND	North Dakota State	20–3
76	October 16, 1971	Fargo, ND	North Dakota	23–7
77	October 21, 1972	Grand Forks, ND	North Dakota State	22–17
78	October 20, 1973	Fargo, ND	North Dakota State	21–14
79	October 19, 1974	Grand Forks, ND	North Dakota	31–20
80	October 18, 1975	Fargo, ND	North Dakota	34–17
81	October 23, 1976	Grand Forks, ND	North Dakota State	22–15
82	October 22, 1977	Fargo, ND	North Dakota State	45–20
83	October 21, 1978	Grand Forks, ND	North Dakota	24–21
84	October 13, 1979	Fargo, ND	North Dakota	14–7
85	October 4, 1980	Grand Forks, ND	North Dakota	38–20
86	September 26, 1981	Fargo, ND	North Dakota State	31–7
87	September 18, 1982	Grand Forks, ND	North Dakota State	10–3
88	October 29, 1983	Fargo, ND	North Dakota State	23–6
89	October 27, 1984	Grand Forks, ND	North Dakota State	14–3
90	November 16, 1985	Fargo, ND	North Dakota State	49–0
91	November 15, 1986	Grand Forks, ND	North Dakota State	62–13
92	November 14, 1987	Fargo, ND	North Dakota State	42–10
93	November 12, 1988	Grand Forks, ND	North Dakota State	34–27
94	November 11, 1989	Fargo, ND	North Dakota State	21–0
95	November 10, 1990	Grand Forks, ND	North Dakota State	42–14
96	November 16, 1991	Fargo, ND	North Dakota State	35–28
97	November 14, 1992	Grand Forks, ND	North Dakota State	20–19
98	October 30, 1993	Grand Forks, ND	North Dakota	22–21
99	October 29, 1994	Fargo, ND	North Dakota	34–13
100	November 26, 1994	Grand Forks, ND	North Dakota	17–7
101	November 4, 1995	Grand Forks, ND	North Dakota	21–7
102	November 18, 1995	Grand Forks, ND	North Dakota State	41–10
103	November 9, 1996	Fargo, ND	North Dakota	33–19
104	October 18, 1997	Grand Forks, ND	North Dakota State	31–10
105	October 17, 1998	Fargo, ND	North Dakota	39–25
106	October 2, 1999	Grand Forks, ND	North Dakota	13–10
107	September 30, 2000	Fargo, ND	North Dakota State	16–13
108	October 6, 2001	Grand Forks, ND	North Dakota	19–7
109	October 12, 2002	Fargo, ND	North Dakota	12–6
110	October 18, 2003	Grand Forks, ND	North Dakota	28–21
111	September 19, 2015	Fargo, ND	#4 North Dakota State	34–9
112	September 7, 2019	Fargo, ND	#1 North Dakota State	38–7
113	March 20, 2021 (Note: Played in the 2020–21 school year. Due to COVID-19, the MVFC moved its conference season from fall 2020 to spring 2021.)	Fargo, ND	#4 North Dakota State	34–13
114	October 2, 2021	Grand Forks, ND	#5 North Dakota State	16–10
115	November 19, 2022	Fargo, ND	#4 North Dakota State	42–21
116	October 14, 2023	Grand Forks, ND	#15 North Dakota	49–24
117	October 5, 2024	Fargo, ND	#2 North Dakota State	41–17
118	November 18, 2025	Grand Forks, ND	#1 North Dakota State	15–10
Series: North Dakota leads 63–52–3

== See also ==
- List of NCAA college football rivalry games
- List of most-played college football series in NCAA Division I
