= List of North Dakota Fighting Hawks football seasons =

This is a list of seasons completed by the North Dakota Fighting Hawks football team of the National Collegiate Athletic Association (NCAA) Division I Football Championship Subdivision (FCS). Since the team's creation in 1894, North Dakota has participated in more than 1,100 officially sanctioned games, holding an all-time record of 687–440–30 and one national championship, won in 2001 at the NCAA Division II level. The team was a charter member of the North Central Conference in 1922, remaining in the league until its dissolution in 2008. The Fighting Sioux then transitioned to the FCS, first joining the Great West Conference before moving to the Big Sky Conference in 2012. In 2020, North Dakota will move to the Missouri Valley Football Conference, joining old foes from the team's North Central days.

== Seasons ==
Year	Coach	Overall	Conference	Standing	Bowl/playoffs	Coaches^{#}	AP^{°}
Adolph F. Bechdolt (Independent) (1894)
1894	Adolph F. Bechdolt	2–2					
Charles S. Farnsworth (Independent) (1895–1896)
1895	Charles S. Farnsworth	1–1					
1896	Charles S. Farnsworth	2–0					
Melvin A. Brannon (Independent) (1897–1898)
1897	Melvin A. Brannon	2–1					
1898	Melvin A. Brannon	1–2					
Harry C. Loomis (Independent) (1899–singe)
1899	Harry C. Loomis	6–0					
Victor L. Littig (Independent) (1900–singe)
1900	Victor L. Littig	5–2–1					
William Nuessle (Independent) (1901–singe)
1901	William Nuessle	3–4					
Harry C. Loomis (Independent) (1902–singe)
1902	Harry C. Loomis	3–2–2					
Rex Kennedy (Independent) (1903–singe)
1903	Rex Kennedy	7–0					
George Sweetland (Independent) (1904–1907)
1904	George Sweetland	6–1					
1905	George Sweetland	6–1–1					
1906	George Sweetland	1–3					
1907	George Sweetland	2–2					
David L. Dunlap (Independent) (1908–1911)
1908	David L. Dunlap	5–2					
1909	David L. Dunlap	4–0–1					
1910	David L. Dunlap	3–3					
1911	David L. Dunlap	2–2–1					
Fred Vehmeier (Independent) (1912)
1912	Fred Vehmeier	1–4					
Fred V. Archer (Independent) (1913)
1913	Fred V. Archer	2–4					
Thomas Andrew Gill (Independent) (1914–1917)
1914	Thomas Andrew Gill	3–5					
1915	Thomas Andrew Gill	2–2–3					
1916	Thomas Andrew Gill	5–2					
1917	Thomas Andrew Gill	2–4					
Paul J. Davis (Independent) (1919–1921)
1919	Paul J. Davis	2–4–1					
1920	Paul J. Davis	4–3–1					
1921	Paul J. Davis	4–4					
Paul J. Davis (North Central Conference) (1922–1925)
1922	Paul J. Davis	3–3	3–1	T–2nd			
1923	Paul J. Davis	5–3	2–1	2nd			
1924	Paul J. Davis	2–8	1–4	T–7th			
1925	Paul J. Davis	4–4	2–2	T–4th			
Tod Rockwell (North Central Conference) (1926–1927)
1926	Tod Rockwell	4–4	3–2	5th			
1927	Tod Rockwell	4–4	2–2	T–3rd			
Charles A. West (North Central Conference) (1928–1941)
1928	Charles A. West	6–1–1	4–0	1st			
1929	Charles A. West	9–1	4–0	1st			
1930	Charles A. West	9–1	4–0	1st	W Los Angeles Bowl		
1931	Charles A. West	8–1–2	4–0	1st			
1932	Charles A. West	7–1	2–1	2nd			
1933	Charles A. West	3–5–1	1–2–1	3rd			
1934	Charles A. West	7–1	3–1	1st			
1935	Charles A. West	6–2–2	3–0–2	2nd			
1936	Charles A. West	9–2	4–0	1st			
1937	Charles A. West	4–4	3–0	1st			
1938	Charles A. West	6–2	3–1	2nd			
1939	Charles A. West	5–3	4–1	T–1st			
1940	Charles A. West	5–4	3–1	2nd			
1941	Charles A. West	4–5	3–1	3rd			
Red Jarrett (North Central Conference) (1942)
1942	Red Jarrett	3–3	2–3	T–5th			
Charles A. West (North Central Conference) (1945)
1945	Charles A. West	1–2	1–1				
Red Jarrett (North Central Conference) (1946–1948)
1946	Red Jarrett	4–3	2–2	4th			
1947	Red Jarrett	4–4	2–2	4th			
1948	Red Jarrett	3–7	3–3	4th			
Dick Miller (North Central Conference) (1949)
1949	Dick Miller	4–3–1	3–2–1	T–3rd			
Frank Zazula (North Central Conference) (1950–1956)
1950	Frank Zazula	5–2–2	3–1–2	3rd			
1951	Frank Zazula	2–4	2–3	4th			
1952	Frank Zazula	3–6	2–4	6th			
1953	Frank Zazula	6–1–1	4–1–1	3rd			
1954	Frank Zazula	4–5	3–3	T–3rd			
1955	Frank Zazula	6–3	3–3	T–4th			
1956	Frank Zazula	2–6	2–4	6th			
Marvin C. Helling (North Central Conference) (1957–1967)
1957	Marvin C. Helling	3–4–1	2–3–1	5th			
1958	Marvin C. Helling	5–3	5–1	1st			
1959	Marvin C. Helling	2–5–1	1–4–1	7th			
1960	Marvin C. Helling	4–3–1	4–2	T–2nd			
1961	Marvin C. Helling	6–3	4–2	T–3rd			
1962	Marvin C. Helling	5–4	3–3	4th			
1963	Marvin C. Helling	6–3	4–2	T–2nd			
1964	Marvin C. Helling	8–1	5–1	T–1st		14	
1965	Marvin C. Helling	9–1	5–1	2nd	W Mineral Water Bowl	8	
1966	Marvin C. Helling	8–2	5–1	T–1st	W Pecan Bowl	5	8
1967	Marvin C. Helling	4–6	4–2	3rd			
Jerry Olson (North Central Conference) (1968–1977)
1968	Jerry Olson	3–5	3–3	T–3rd			
1969	Jerry Olson	4–5	3–3	T–3rd			
1970	Jerry Olson	5–3–1	4–1–1	2nd		18	
1971	Jerry Olson	6–3–1	5–1	1st			9
1972	Jerry Olson	10–1	6–1	T–1st	W Camellia Bowl	6	6
1973	Jerry Olson	6–4	4–3	T–3rd			
1974	Jerry Olson	6–4	5–2	T–1st			
1975	Jerry Olson	9–1	7–0	1st	L NCAA Division II First Round	1	7
1976	Jerry Olson	1–7–1	1–4–1	5th			
1977	Jerry Olson	4–6–1	2–4–1	T–6th			
Gene Murphy (North Central Conference) (1978–1979)
1978	Gene Murphy	5–5	3–3	T–3rd			
1979	Gene Murphy	10–2	5–1	1st	L NCAA Division II Quarterfinal		3
Pat Behrns (North Central Conference) (1980–1985)
1980	Pat Behrns	6–4	5–2	T–2nd			
1981	Pat Behrns	6–4	4–3	T–2nd			
1982	Pat Behrns	7–3	5–2	2nd			
1983	Pat Behrns	6–5	4–5	T–4th			
1984	Pat Behrns	8–3	6–3	4th			
1985	Pat Behrns	3–8	2–7	T–8th			
Roger Thomas (North Central Conference) (1986–1998)
1986	Roger Thomas	2–9	2–7	9th			
1987	Roger Thomas	6–4	5–4	T–4tg			
1988	Roger Thomas	7–4	5–4	T–4th			
1989	Roger Thomas	3–7–1	2–6–1	9th			
1990	Roger Thomas	7–3	7–2	2nd			12
1991	Roger Thomas	7–2	6–2	T–2nd			17
1992	Roger Thomas	6–4–1	6–2–1	2nd	L NCAA Division II First Round		13
1993	Roger Thomas	10–3	7–2	T–1st	L NCAA Division II Semifinal		9
1994	Roger Thomas	10–3	7–2	T–1st	L NCAA Division II Semifinal		15
1995	Roger Thomas	9–2	8–1	1st	L NCAA Division II First Round		7
1996	Roger Thomas	7–3	6–3	T–2nd			19
1997	Roger Thomas	8–2	7–2	T–2nd			
1998	Roger Thomas	8–3	7–2	3rd	L NCAA Division II First Round		7
Dale Lennon (North Central Conference) (1999–2007)
1999	Dale Lennon	9–2	8–1	T–1st	L NCAA Division II First Round		9
2000	Dale Lennon	8–3	6–3	T–3rd			5
2001	Dale Lennon	14–1	7–1	1st	W NCAA Division II Championship		4
2002	Dale Lennon	5–6	3–5	7th			
2003	Dale Lennon	12–2	7–0	1st	L NCAA Division II Championship		7
2004	Dale Lennon	11–3	4–2	T–2nd	L NCAA Division II Semifinal		4
2005	Dale Lennon	10–3	4–2	T–1st	L NCAA Division II Second Round		8
2006	Dale Lennon	11–2	7–1	T–1st	L NCAA Division II Quarterfinal		7
2007	Dale Lennon	10–2	7–1	2nd	L NCAA Division II Second Round		9
Chris Mussman (Great West Conference) (2008–2011)
2008	Chris Mussman	6–4	1–2	3rd			
2009	Chris Mussman	6–5	2–2	T–2nd			
2010	Chris Mussman	3–8	0–4	5th			
2011	Chris Mussman	8–3	3–1	T–1st			23
Chris Mussman (Big Sky Conference) (2012–2013)
2012	Chris Mussman	5–6	3–5	T–8th			
2013	Chris Mussman	3–8	2–6	10th			
Kyle Schweigert (Big Sky Conference) (2014–2017)
2014	Kyle Schweigert	5–7	3–5	T–8th			
2015	Kyle Schweigert	7–4	5–3	T–4th			
2016	Kyle Schweigert	9–3	8–0	T–1st	L NCAA Division I FCS Second Round	12	12
2017	Kyle Schweigert	3–8	2–6	T–9th			
Kyle Schweigert (Independent) (2018–2019)
2018	Kyle Schweigert	6–5					
2019	Kyle Schweigert	7–5			L NCAA Division I FCS First Round		
Kyle Schweigert (Missouri Valley Football Conference) (2020–2024)
2020	Kyle Schweigert	5–2	4–1	T–1st	L NCAA Division I FCS Quarterfinal	6	6
2021	Kyle Schweigert	5–6	3–5	T–7th			
2022	Kyle Schweigert	7–5	5–3	T–3rd	L NCAA Division I FCS First Round		20
2023	Kyle Schweigert	7–5	5–3	T–3rd	L NCAA Division I FCS First Round	14	12
2024	Kyle Schweigert	5–7	2–6	T–8th			
Eric Schmidt (Missouri Valley Football Conference) (2025–present)
2025	Eric Schmidt	7–5	5–3	T–3rd			
Total:		687–440–30					
National championship Conference title Conference division title or championship game berth
^{†}Indicates Bowl Coalition, Bowl Alliance, BCS, or CFP / New Years' Six bowl.; ^{#}Rankings from final Coaches Poll.
