= List of North Dakota Fighting Hawks men's basketball head coaches =

The following is a list of North Dakota Fighting Hawks men's basketball head coaches. There have been 19 head coaches of the Fighting Hawks in their 98-season history.

North Dakota's current head coach is Paul Sather. He was hired as the Fighting Hawks' head coach in May 2019, replacing Brian Jones, who left to join the staff at Illinois State.

No.	Tenure	Coach	Years	Record	Pct.
1	1904–1908	George Sweetland	4	29–3	.906
2	1908–1912	David L. Dunlap	4	33–17	.660
3	1912–1913	Charles Armstrong	1	6–4	.600
4	1913–1914	Fred V. Archer	1	10–7	.588
5	1914–1918	Thomas Andrew Gill	4	36–10	.783
6	1918–1919	Harry Caldwell	1	6–2	.750
7	1919–1924	Paul J. Davis	5	60–18	.769
8	1924–1925	Dutch Houser	1	5–13	.278
9	1925–1943	Clement W. Leitch	18	224–106	.679
10	1944–1945	Charles A. West	1	4–7	.364
11	1945–1946; 1949–1951	Red Jarrett	3	39–26	.600
12	1946–1949	Cookie Cunningham	3	42–43	.494
13	1951–1962	Louis D. Bogan	11	102–149	.406
14	1962–1967	Bill Fitch	5	94–45	.676
15	1967–1970	Jimmy Rodgers	3	39–35	.527
16	1970–1988	Dave Gunther	18	332–177	.652
17	1988–2006	Rich Glas	18	335–194	.633
18	2006–2019	Brian Jones	13	190–217	.467
19	2019–present	Paul Sather	4	43–80	.350
Totals		19 coaches	98 seasons	1,629–1,153	.586
Records updated through end of 2022–23 season Source
