= Bechdolt =

Bechdolt is a surname. Notable people with the surname include:

- Adolph F. Bechdolt (1846–1938), American football coach
- Jack Bechdolt (1884–1954), American writer and journalist
- Maureen Bechdolt (born 1952), American archer
