= Rock Run Settlement =

Norwegian-American immigrant settlement

Rock Run Settlement was a pioneer settlement in Illinois established in 1839 by Norwegian-Americans. It was named after the town of Rock Run.

== Geography ==
The settlement straddled Stephenson County and Winnebago County. The locality was prairie, relieved in parts by timberland.

== History ==
The foundation of this settlement was accredited to an immigrant from Numedal, who came on the Amelia, in 1839. His name was Clemet Torstenson Stabæk, and he came from Rollaug Parish. With him three others located there in the fall of 1839, namely, Syvert Tollefson and Ole Anderson, from Numedal, and a Mr. Knudson, from Drammen. Stabæk was a man of considerable means. He selected land in Winnebago County, Illinois near Davis, Illinois. His son, Torsten K. O. Stabæk (born in Norway) married Torgen Patterson, and they lived on the farm until 1884, when they moved to Davis. Kristopher Rostad and wife, Kristi, seem also to have moved to Rock Run before the close of 1839. In the following summer came Gunnul Stordok. Stordok lived in Rock Run until 1870; he then moved back to Newark, Wisconsin, where the rest of his relatives who had come to the U.S. had settled. Gunnul Stordok was born in Rollaug, Numedal, in the year 1800; he married Mary Larson (of Rollaug) before emigrating.

Among the earliest arrivals in the settlement subsequently was Halvor Aasen, born in Numedal in 1823, and who came to the U.S. in 1841. For two years after coming to this country, he worked in the lead mines at Mineral Point, Wisconsin, and at Galena, Illinois. In 1843, he married Christie Olson, and bought a farm in Laona Township, Winnebago County, where he and his wife moved in 1844. Here they lived until their death. She died in 1902, and he in March, 1905.

The Rock Run Settlement was prosperous but did not grow to such proportions as other Norwegian-American settlements to the north. In later years, many of its earlier pioneers moved back to Rock County, Wisconsin, as Stordok did, and as Lars Rostad and family also did in the 1860s. Among those who located at Rock Run in the 1840s were Hovel Paulson (born 1817) from North Land Parish, Norway, who located near Davis in 1846; Christian Lunde, also from Land, Norway, came to Rock Run in 1848 and later moved to Goodhue County, Minnesota; Narve Stabæk, Torsten Knudson and Nels Nelson, all three from Numedal; Gunder O. Halvorson, from Kragerø; Svale Nilson, from Bukn Parish, Stavanger; Gunder Halvorson, from Telemarken, and Lars O. Anderson.

In 1848, there were 20 families, 12 unmarried men over 20 years of age, six unmarried women of over 20 years, while there were 32 persons below the age of 20. The whole settlement numbered 90 persons and comprised 4,062 acres (1,644 ha) of land. Two years later, there were 180 families and a population of 942.
