= Luke Schleusner =

American football coach (born 1979)

Current position
- Title: Offensive coordinator and quarterbacks coach
- Team: New Mexico
- Conference: Mountain West

Biographical details
- Born: February 14, 1979 (age 47); Menomonie, Wisconsin

Playing career
- 1998–2001: North Dakota
- Position: Wide receiver

Coaching career (HC unless noted)
- 2002–2003: Western Illinois (GA/TE)
- 2004: Western Illinois (GA/ST/TE)
- 2005–2008: Minnesota State (ST/RC)
- 2009–2010: Minnesota State (WR/Passing game)
- 2011: North Dakota (TE/FB)
- 2012: North Dakota (WR/Passing game)
- 2013: North Dakota (OC/WR)
- 2014–2019: South Dakota State (TE)
- 2020–2021: South Dakota State (WR/Passing game)
- 2022–2024: Idaho (OC/QB)
- 2025–present: New Mexico (OC/QB)

Accomplishments and honors

Championships
- NCAA Division II football championship (2001)

Awards
- 2 x All-North Central Conference academic honors; All-North Central Conference team (2001)

Luke Schleusner (born February 14, 1979) is an American college football coach and former player. He is the offensive coordinator and quarterbacks coach at the University of New Mexico, a position he has held since 2025.

== Playing career ==
Schleusner grew up in Menomonie, Wisconsin and attended Menomonie High School. He attended the University of North Dakota and graduated with a bachelor's degree in sociology. At North Dakota, he played wide receiver from 1998 to 2001. (Note: Some media guides give his playing years as 1997-2001 or 1999-2002.) Among his college roommates was Josh Kotelnicki, later a fellow member of the North Dakota coaching staff. In the 2001 NCAA Division II football championship game against Grand Valley State University, he made a crucial 56-yard reception to set up the game-winning touchdown. While at North Dakota Schleusner twice received all-North Central Conference (NCC) academic honors and was named to the all-NCC team in 2001.

== Coaching career ==
Schleusner began his coaching career at Western Illinois University in Macomb, Illinois, where he was a graduate assistant from 2002–2004 under head coach Don Patterson. He joined the staff of second-year head coach Jeff Jamrog at Minnesota State as special teams coordinator in 2005. Jamrog resigned after the 2007 season to become an assistant athletic director at Nebraska and was succeeded by South Dakota offensive coordinator Todd Hoffner. Hoffner retained Schleusner on his staff. Schleusner become wide receivers coach and passing game coordinator in 2009, and remained at Minnesota State through the 2010 season.

In 2011, Schleusner returned to his alma mater as tight ends coach under head coach Chris Mussman. The move reunited him with Josh Kotelnicki, his former roommate, who was already on staff as the linebackers coach. While at North Dakota, Schleusner helped recruit St. Rita of Cascia High School wide receiver Kenny Golladay. Schleusner coached wide receivers in 2012, and then became offensive coordinator in 2013.

North Dakota fired Mussman after the 2013 season. South Dakota State hired Schleusner as its tight ends coach, under long-time head coach John Stiegelmeier. Schleusner was tight ends coach from 2014–2019, and then wide receivers coach/passing game coordinator from 2020–2021. When offensive coordinator Jason Eck departed the South Dakota State staff after the 2021 season to become the new head coach at Idaho, Schleusner went with him as offensive coordinator.

During Eck's three-year tenure at Idaho the Vandals made the NCAA Division I Football playoffs each year, with Schleusner's offense playing a major role. Eck accepted the head coaching job at New Mexico following the 2024 season, and brought much of his staff, including Schleusner, with him.
