= George B. Wells =

American football coach

Coaching career (HC unless noted)
- 1898: Alma

Head coaching record
- Overall: 1–2

George B. Wells was an American college football coach. Wells attended Alma College in Alma, Michigan, and as a student, conducted the preliminary coaching of the Alma football team after the previous coach, John H. Rice, left the school. During the season, the coaching duties were carried out by George Sweetland of Grand Rapids, Michigan, and the team compiled a record of 1–2.

== Head coaching record ==
Year	Team	Overall	Conference	Standing	Bowl/playoffs
Alma Maroon and Cream (Independent) (1898)
1898	Alma	1–2			
Alma:		1–2			
Total:		1–2			
