= 1991 North Dakota Fighting Sioux football team =

American college football season

1991 North Dakota Fighting Sioux football
- Conference: North Central Conference
- Record: 7–2 (6–2 NCC)
- Head coach: Roger Thomas (6th season)
- Home stadium: Memorial Stadium

1991 North Central Conference football standings
	Conf.					Overall
Team	W		L		T	W		L		T
No. 7 North Dakota State $^	7	–	1	–	0	7	–	3	–	0
No. 4 Northern Colorado ^	6	–	2	–	0	8	–	3	–	0
No. 17 North Dakota	6	–	2	–	0	7	–	2	–	0
South Dakota State	5	–	3	–	0	7	–	3	–	0
No. 13 Mankato State ^	5	–	3	–	0	8	–	4	–	0
St. Cloud State	5	–	3	–	0	6	–	3	–	0
Nebraska–Omaha	4	–	4	–	0	6	–	4	–	0
Morningside	1	–	7	–	0	2	–	8	–	0
South Dakota	1	–	7	–	0	1	–	8	–	0
Augustana (SD)	0	–	8	–	0	0	–	10	–	0
$ – Conference champion; ^ – NCAA Division II playoff participant; Rankings from NCAA Division II Football Committee poll

The 1991 North Dakota Fighting Sioux football team, also known as the Nodaks, was an American football team that represented the University of North Dakota as a member of the North Central Conference (NCC) during the 1991 NCAA Division II football season. Led by sixth-year head coach Roger Thomas, the Fighting Sioux compiled an overall record of 7–2 with a mark of 6–2 in conference play, tying for second place in the NCC. North Dakota played home games at Memorial Stadium in Grand Forks, North Dakota.

== Schedule ==
Date	Opponent	Rank	Site	Result	Attendance	Source
September 14	Moorhead State*		Memorial Stadium; Grand Forks, ND	W 21–14	2,271	
September 21	South Dakota State		Memorial Stadium; Grand Forks, ND	W 36–10	7,468	
September 28	at South Dakota		DakotaDome; Vermillion, SD	W 21–6	2,600	
October 5	Morningside	No. 15	Memorial Stadium; Grand Forks, ND	W 35–0	2,132	
October 12	Augustana (SD)	No. 11	Memorial Stadium; Grand Forks, ND	W 20–15	4,200	
October 19	St. Cloud State	No. 8	Memorial Stadium; Grand Forks, ND	W 21–17	7,511	
October 26	at Mankato State		Blakeslee Stadium; Mankato, MN	L 18–21	2,405	
November 2	Northern Colorado	No. T–19	Memorial Stadium; Grand Forks, ND	postponed		
November 9	at Nebraska–Omaha		Al F. Caniglia Field; Omaha, NE	W 28–13	1,800	
November 16	at No. 7 North Dakota	No. 17	Dacotah Field; Fargo, ND (Nickel Trophy)	L 28–35	12,503	
*Non-conference game; Rankings from AP Poll released prior to the game
