= Fred Vehmeier =

American football coach

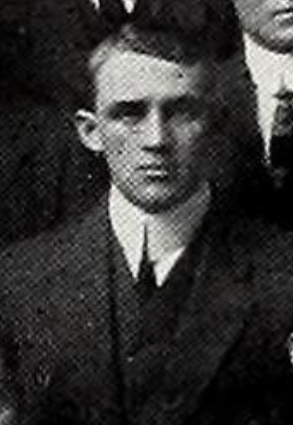
- Vehmeier at Illinois

Biographical details
- Born: July 28, 1888; Rock City, Illinois, U.S.
- Died: July 13, 1970 (aged 81); Rockford, Illinois, U.S.

Playing career
- 1909–1910: Beloit
- 1911: Illinois (freshmen)
- Positions: End, tackle

Coaching career (HC unless noted)
- 1912: North Dakota

Head coaching record
- Overall: 1–4

Frederick Eldon Vehmeier Jr. (July 28, 1888 – July 13, 1970) was an American college football player and coach. He played football at Beloit College and the University of Illinois and was selected as an all-state player at the end position in 1909. Vehmeier served as the head football coach at the University of North Dakota in 1912, compiling a record of 1–4.

== Early life ==
Vehmeier was born July 28, 1888, in Rock City, Illinois. He was a native of Dakota and attended high school in Dixon, before playing college football at Beloit for two years. He was a left end for Beloit but repeatedly got injured, including one injury in a 1909 game that nearly required an amputation. Several papers referred to him as a "star" athlete. At the end of the 1909 season, he was selected as a first-team all-state end by at least two Wisconsin sports writers. One account described him as follows:

Vehmeier is doubtless the best end Beloit has had in many years. He was especially strong on defensive and in receiving forward passes, and he put his whole force into the game, regardless of consequences.

Vehmeier later played freshman football as a tackle and baseball at the University of Illinois in 1911. He was still attending Illinois by 1912, despite his coaching career being at the same time. Vehmeier was a well-known figure in local towns and cities. He was hired as a traveling agent for International Harvester company in June 1912.

== Coaching career ==
In October 1912, Vehmeier was named head football coach at the University of North Dakota (UND) in Grand Forks. The Grand Forks Herald of October 5 stated that he was "one of the best football coaches in the United States," and described him as follows: "His name is not known in this part of the country, although he comes from back east, for he has coached and played with some of the best baseball and football teams that the University of Illinois ever turned out. Vehmeier arrived in Grand Forks last night. One-look at him and you will be convinced that he knows something about athletics. In build he is a regular bull moose, broad of shoulder, deep chested and husky limbed. Any candidate for the university football team who gets a bit sassy can count on a beating, if this new coach is the man he looks to be."

When Vehmeier joined the team, they were said to have had a poor roster and many thought coaching them was "a hopeless task." In the short time he had between his hiring and their first game, he was able to help develop a "strong team." North Dakota lost their opener, against Hamline, but were reported as getting "stronger each day" under Vehmeier's stiff practices.

However, when North Dakota played their next game, they lost by 35 to Carleton, although a report from the Grand Forks Herald the next day stated that it was not Vehmeier's fault, writing "Ten million Vehmeier's [sic] could not have made North Dakota play Saturday. As many more Vehmeiers and a couple of bushels of Armstrongs could not have infused life into a dead body. The men who played against Carleton did not show the stuff that counts. With one or two exceptions they did not fight. They played an indifferent variety of football that sent chills down the spines of the boys who love their alma mater. Their attack was anaemic, weak and thin, and when they were guarding the yearned-for goal line, they were as feeble as a centenarian with the palsy."

The North Dakota football team then went to play Macalester and Vehmeier said in the Wausau Daily Herald that he expected a big improvement from the team compared to their game against Carleton. They ended up losing the match, 19–6. A news report said that, "If the football rules can be so amended that Coach Vehmeier may be permitted to walk up and down the side lines, driving the university team with vitriolic words, there would be no doubt that the pink and green warriors would emerge from the contest victorious. But the football rules committee does not like that kind of playing, and consequently Mr. Vehmeier will have to be content with dragging his body up and down the field, biting savagely at the end of a big, black cigar."

Excerpt from The Dacotah, the UND yearbook

...a special coach was hired, Vehmeier of the University of Illinois. He ... gradually whipped the team into shape, and by the time of the [North Dakota Agricultural] game could well be proud of his efforts. That game was an epoch-making game in the annals of U. N. D. We won, 3 to 0; but the mere winning is not the big thing, not the thing to be remembered. The college spirit that had long seemed slumbering, suddenly awoke and proved its existence and mighty powers... That day, November 6, 1912, was the most memorable day in our football history.

— Editors of The Dacotah

Afterwards, UND returned home and played the North Dakota Agricultural Aggies, and won 3–0, in what ended up being their only win of the season as they finished soon after with a loss to South Dakota. Despite finishing with a 1–4 record, Vehmeier's team was still named North Dakota state champions by way of their victory over North Dakota Agricultural. The Grand Forks Herald wrote that he "deserves much credit for the way he coached his men."

In at least one modern source about the North Dakota football program, he has been mistakenly referred to as John Vehmeier.

== Family and later years ==
Vehmeier returned to Illinois after the 1912 season, and did not continue coaching UND afterwards. In November 1915, Vehmeier was married at Waterloo, Iowa, to Bessie B. Leamon. They had a son, George. As of May 1916, Vehmeier was employed by the Honduras Land Company. He later served in World War I. In later years, he worked as a real estate agent. Vehmeier's wife died in October 1969. He died nine months later in July 1970 at St. Anthony Hospital in Rockford, Illinois, at age 81.

== Head coaching record ==
Year	Team	Overall	Conference	Standing	Bowl/playoffs
North Dakota Flickertails (Independent) (1912)
1912	North Dakota	1–4			
North Dakota:		1–4			
Total:		1–4			
