= Rock City, Illinois =

Rock City
- Village
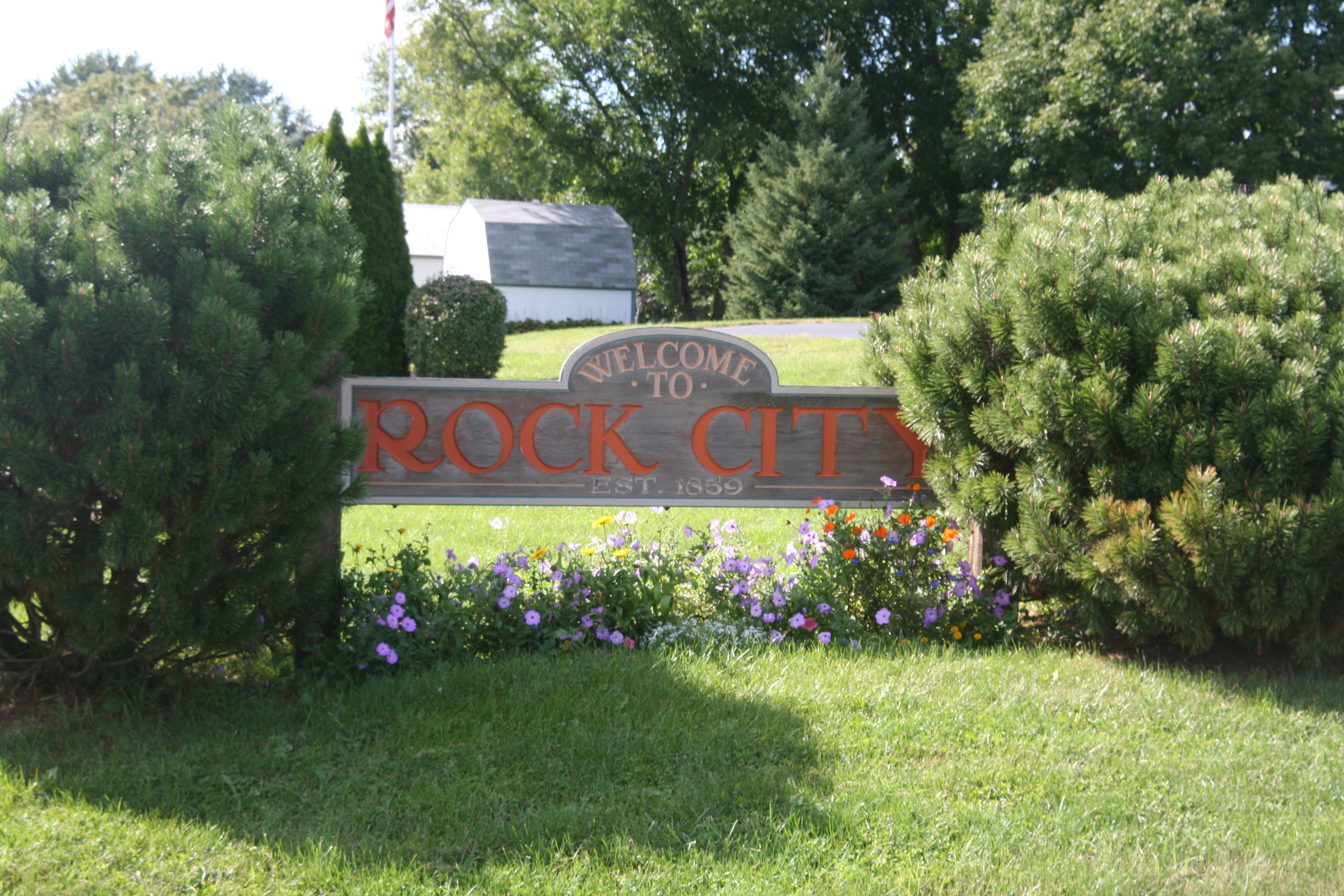
- Sign upon entering the village of Rock City.

- Location of Rock City in Stephenson County, Illinois.
- Coordinates: 42°24′47″N 89°28′16″W
- Country: United States
- State: Illinois
- County: Stephenson
- Township: Rock Run
- Founded: 1859

Area
  - Total: 0.14 sq mi (0.35 km^{2})
  - Land: 0.14 sq mi (0.35 km^{2})
  - Water: 0 sq mi (0.00 km^{2})
- Elevation: 906 ft (276 m)

Population (2020)
  - Total: 293
  - Density: 2,183.7/sq mi (843.14/km^{2})
- Time zone: UTC-6 (CST)
  - Summer (DST): UTC-5 (CDT)
- ZIP code: 61070
- Area code: 815
- FIPS code: 17-64837
- GNIS feature ID: 2399101
- Website: villageofrockcity.com

Rock City is a village in Stephenson County, Illinois. As of the 2020 census, Rock City had a population of 293.

== History ==
Very little is known on the early days of the town, but it is believed that a man known as Samuel Jay Davis built the first general store in 1859. The neighboring village of Davis bears his name. Up until the present day the economy of the town is centered around agriculture. Mainly wheat and corn. Unlike many other small towns in the state, it is not located near a body of water or a railroad. This is why the town's population remained steady for over 150 years.

== Geography ==
According to the 2010 census, Rock City has a total area of 0.15 square miles (0.39 km^{2}), all land.

== Demographics ==
Historical population
Census	Pop.	Note	%±
1880	161		—
1890	148		−8.1%
1900	174		17.6%
1910	122		−29.9%
1920	159		30.3%
1930	150		−5.7%
1940	134		−10.7%
1950	157		17.2%
1960	202		28.7%
1970	251		24.3%
1980	293		16.7%
1990	286		−2.4%
2000	313		9.4%
2010	315		0.6%
2020	293		−7.0%
U.S. Decennial Census

2010 U.S. Census

At the 2010 census, there were 315 people which is an increase of 0.6% from the 2000 census. This breaks down as 174 males and 141 females. A total of 307 people were Non-Hispanic or Latino. By race, there were 305 people indicated as white with the remaining 10 indicated as being identified by two or more races.

There were a total of 128 housing units with 123 occupied. Of the 128 households, 47.8% had children under the age of 18 living with them. The average household size was 2.56 and the average family size was 3.06.

The median household income was $56,731, and the median family income was $71,250. Males had a median income of $40,446 versus $26,250 for females.

The three largest employers in Rock City are Pregl Services, US Bank, and Tri-District Ambulance.

2000 U.S. Census

At the 2000 census, there were 313 people, 120 households, and 81 families residing in the village. The population density was 2,195.7 inhabitants per square mile (847.8/km^{2}). There were 122 housing units at an average density of 855.9 per square mile (330.5/km^{2}). The racial makeup of the village was 99.68% White, and 0.32% from two or more races.

There were 120 households, of which 40.0% had children under the age of 18 living with them, 55.8% were married couples living together, 7.5% had a female householder with no husband present, and 31.7% were non-families. 28.3% of all households were made up of individuals, and 18.3% had someone living alone who was 65 years of age or older. The average household size was 2.61 and the average family size was 3.24.

Age distribution was 31.0% under the age of 18, 6.4% from 18 to 24, 28.8% from 25 to 44, 16.6% from 45 to 64, and 17.3% who were 65 years of age or older. The median age was 34 years. For every 100 females, there were 93.2 males. For every 100 females age 18 and over, there were 92.9 males.

The median household income was $46,250, and the median family income was $51,750. Males had a median income of $35,417 versus $25,417 for females. The per capita income for the village was $20,920. About 3.4% of families and 4.7% of the population were below the poverty line, including 2.9% of those under age 18 and 5.1% of those age 65 or over.

== Education ==
It is in the Dakota Community Unit School District 201.
