= 1945 North Dakota Fighting Sioux football team =

American college football season

1945 North Dakota Fighting Sioux football
- Conference: North Central Conference
- Record: 1–2 (1–1 NCC)
- Head coach: Charles A. West (14th season)
- Home stadium: Memorial Stadium

The 1945 North Dakota Fighting Sioux football team, also known as the Nodaks, was an American football team that represented the University of North Dakota in the North Central Conference (NCC) during the 1945 college football season. In its 14th year under head coach Charles A. West, the team compiled a 1–2 record (1–1 against NCC opponents) and was outscored by a total of 59 to 43. The team opened its season with a 21–16 loss to the Winnipeg Blue Bombers, a professional football team from Canada.

== Schedule ==
Date	Opponent	Site	Result	Attendance	Source
October 13	Winnipeg Blue Bombers*	Memorial Stadium; Grand Forks, ND	L 16–21		
October 20	North Dakota Agricultural	Memorial Stadium; Grand Forks, ND (rivalry)	W 20–12		
October 27	at North Dakota Agricultural	Dacotah Field; Fargo, ND	L 7–26		
*Non-conference game
