= Rock Run Township, Illinois =

Rock Run Township
- Township
- Location in Stephenson County
- Coordinates: 42°23′29″N 89°27′50″W
- Country: United States
- State: Illinois
- County: Stephenson

Government
  - Supervisor: Ray Bordner

Area
  - Total: 47.84 sq mi (123.9 km^{2})
  - Land: 47.82 sq mi (123.9 km^{2})
  - Water: 0.02 sq mi (0.052 km^{2}) 0.04%
- Elevation: 909 ft (277 m)

Population (2010)
  - Estimate (2016): 2,153
  - Density: 47/sq mi (18/km^{2})
- Time zone: UTC-6 (CST)
  - Summer (DST): UTC-5 (CDT)
- FIPS code: 17-177-65143

Rock Run Township is located in Stephenson County, Illinois. As of the 2010 census, its population was 2,247 and it contained 969 housing units. The villages of Rock City and Davis are located in the township.

== Geography ==
Rock Run is Townships 27 (part) and 28 (part) North, Range 9 East of the Fourth Principal Meridian.

According to the 2010 census, the township has a total area of 47.84 square miles (123.9 km^{2}), of which 47.82 square miles (123.9 km^{2}) (or 99.96%) is land and 0.02 square miles (0.052 km^{2}) (or 0.04%) is water.

== History ==
The Norwegian-American Rock Run Settlement was established in 1839. Named after the town of Rock Run, it lay partly in Stephenson, partly in Winnebago County, Illinois.

=== Mills ===
Carnefix Mill, a three–story stone grist mill was built at Irish Grove 4 miles (6.4 km) south of Davis on Rock Run creek by George Raymer in the 1850s. The mill was still standing in 1970.

Davis Manufacturing Company Mill, built in Davis in 1876, was a 3 1/2-story stone flour mill with four run of stone powered by steam. The mill closed in 1880 and was demolished.

Epplyanna Mill (Section 15) a three–story stone grist mill was built on Rock Run north of Rock City by James Epley in 1854. It ceased operation in 1910. After 1910, it was used as a barn. It was demolished by dynamite in 1955.

== Demographics ==
Historical population
Census	Pop.	Note	%±
2016 (est.)	2,153
U.S. Decennial Census
