= 1945 North Dakota Agricultural Bison football team =

American college football season

1945 North Dakota Agricultural Bison football
- Conference: North Central Conference
- Record: 1–4–1 ( NCC)
- Head coach: Robert A. Lowe (2nd season)
- Home stadium: Dacotah Field

The 1945 North Dakota Agricultural Bison football team was an American football team that represented North Dakota Agricultural College (now known as North Dakota State University) in the North Central Conference (NCC) during the 1945 college football season. In its second season under head coach Robert A. Lowe, the team compiled a 1–4–1 record. The team played its home games at Dacotah Field in Fargo, North Dakota.

== Schedule ==
Date	Opponent	Site	Result	Source
September 28	at Bemidji State*	Bemidji, MN	L 0–6	
October 5	at Winnipeg Blue Bombers*	(Canada) Osborne Stadium; Winnipeg, MB	L 0–27	
October 13	Concordia–Moorhead*	Dacotah Field; Fargo, ND	T 0–0	
October 20	at North Dakota	Memorial Stadium; Grand Forks, ND (Nickel Trophy)	L 12–20	
October 27	North Dakota^{†}	Dacotah Field; Fargo, ND	W 26–7	
November 3	at Hamline*	Norton Field; Saint Paul, MN	L 0–43	
*Non-conference game; ^{†}Homecoming
