= Jerry Olson =

American football coach (1933–2023)

Biographical details
- Born: November 6, 1933; Walsh County, North Dakota, U.S.
- Died: February 25, 2023 (aged 89); Grafton, North Dakota, U.S.

Playing career

Football
- 1953: Trinidad
- 1954: Valley City State

Basketball
- c. 1954: Valley City State

Baseball
- c. 1954: Valley City State
- Position: Tackle (football)

Coaching career (HC unless noted)

Football
- c. 1955: Pelican Rapids HS (MN)
- c. 1960: North Dakota (freshman)
- 1961: Pelican Rapids HS (MN)
- 1962–1967: North Dakota (assistant)
- 1968–1977: North Dakota

Head coaching record
- Overall: 54–39–4 (college)
- Bowls: 1–0
- Tournaments: 0–1 (NCAA D-II playoffs)

Accomplishments and honors

Championships
- 4 NCC (1971–1972, 1974–1975)

Jerroll Dean Olson (November 6, 1933 – February 25, 2023) was an American football coach. He served as the head football coach at the University of North Dakota from 1968 to 1977, compiling a record of 54–39–4.

== Biography ==
Olson was born in 1933, on a farm in Walsh County, North Dakota. He graduated from high school in Hoople, North Dakota. In 1953, Olson played football as a tackle at Trinidad State Junior College—now known as Trinidad State College—in Trinidad, Colorado under head coach Dale Hardy, earning all-conference honors and leading the Trojans to an undefeated season and an Empire Junior College Conference (EJCC) title. Olson then attended Valley City State University, where he lettered in football, basketball, and baseball.

Olson died in Grafton, North Dakota on February 25, 2023, at the age of 89.

== Head coaching record ==
=== College ===
Year	Team	Overall	Conference	Standing	Bowl/playoffs
North Dakota Fighting Sioux (North Central Conference) (1968–1977)
1968	North Dakota	3–5	3–3	T–3rd	
1969	North Dakota	4–5	3–3	T–3rd	
1970	North Dakota	5–3–1	4–1–1	2nd	
1971	North Dakota	6–3–1	5–1	1st	
1972	North Dakota	10–1	6–1	T–1st	W Camellia
1973	North Dakota	6–4	4–3	T–3rd	
1974	North Dakota	6–4	5–2	T–1st	
1975	North Dakota	9–1	7–0	1st	L NCAA Division II First Round
1976	North Dakota	1–7–1	1–4–1	5th	
1977	North Dakota	4–6–1	2–4–1	T–6th	
North Dakota:		54–39–4	39–23–3		
Total:		54–39–4			
National championship Conference title Conference division title or championship game berth
