= Victor L. Littig =

American football player and coach (1873–1936)

Biographical details
- Born: December 7, 1873; Davenport, Iowa, U.S.
- Died: July 13, 1936 (aged 62); Davenport, Iowa, U.S.

Playing career
- 1893–1894: Iowa
- Position: End

Coaching career (HC unless noted)
- 1893: Davenport HS (IA)
- 1900: North Dakota
- 1916: Davenport Athletic Club

Victor Louis Littig (December 7, 1873 – July 13, 1936) was an American football player and coach. He served as the head football coach at the University of North Dakota in 1900.

Littig played college football at the University of Iowa. He served as the first football coach at Davenport High School.

In 1916, Littig coach the Davenport Athletic Club team to a 7–2–1 record despite enduring a player revolt.
