= Melvin A. Brannon =

American scientist, college president and coach in football and athletics

Melvin Brannon
Biographical details
- Born: September 11, 1865; Lowell, Indiana, U.S.
- Died: March 24, 1950 (aged 84); Gainesville, Florida, U.S.
- Education: Wabash College, University of Chicago

Coaching career (HC unless noted)
- 1897–1898: North Dakota

Head coaching record
- Overall: 3–3

Melvin Amos Brannon (1865 – March 26, 1950) was a biological scientist, university dean and (briefly) coach at University of North Dakota for athletics and American football.

== Early life and education ==
Brannon was born in 1865 near Lowell, Indiana. He attended Wabash College, in Crawfordsville, Indiana and gained a B.A. degree in 1889 followed by an M.A. in 1890. In 1911–12, while working in a senior position at the University of North Dakota, Brannon completed a thesis for a Ph.D. from the University of Chicago, and was awarded the degree summa cum laude for only the second time in Botany. The title of his thesis was The Salton Sea: The Action of Salton Sea Water on Vegetable Tissues and it was published in 1914.

== Academic career ==
Brannon initially taught at a high school biology in Fort Wayne, Indiana. He worked at the Marine Biological Laboratory at Woods Hole in Massachusetts in the summer. This was affiliated to the University of Chicago. In 1894 he was appointed as a professor of biology at the University of North Dakota. He published scientific research about fungi, lichens, bacteria, blue-green algae and unicellular algae. He maintained an interest in algae for over 50 years. However, Brannon also showed considerable ability in university administration. This led to his major roles in the development of the university and a series of senior leadership roles at other universities. He proposed and led expansion of the university's buildings housing science departments. He founded the School of Medicine in 1905 and served as its Dean from 1905 to 1911. In 1909 he led development of a biological station at Devil's Lake and was its Director from 1909 until 1914. He served as the dean of the university's college of liberal arts from 1911 to 1914. In 1912 - 13 he employed Norma E. Pfeiffer as part-time governess to his daughters.

He was also the university's director of athletics from 1896 to 1903 and head football coach from 1897 to 1903, compiling a record of 3–3.

In 1909, Bannon was one of the founders and first president of the North Dakota Academy of Science.

Bannon developed the local public health facilities and regulations. He was instrumental in locating the State Public Health Laboratory at the university in 1907. He designed and gained approval for regulations related to milk that decreased the local incidence of tuberculosis. He provided consultancy advice to a local company that prevented the growth of weevils in its breakfast cereals.

Brannon served in an executive role at three additional schools: president of the University of Idaho from 1914 to 1917, president of Beloit College from 1917 to 1923 and chancellor of the University of Montana from 1923 to 1933. He instigated development of two additional colleges at the University of Montana while he was chancellor. He retired in 1933 and spent a short time in Europe. He continued writing and publishing scientific research he had undertaken on microalgae at the University of Wisconsin and University of Florida until his death.

He was president of the Wisconsin Colleges Association (1919–1921), president of the Wisconsin Academy of Sciences from 1922 until 1923, president of the Northwest Science Association in 1925-26 and the president of the National Association of State Universities in 1928.

Brannon died at the age of 84, on March 26, 1950, in Gainesville, Florida.

== Publications ==
Brannon was the author or co-author of a number of scientific and other publications. They included:

- Melvin A. Brannon, posthumously (1952) Some Myxophyceae in Florida. Quarterly Journal of the Florida Academy of Science, 8 pages 296–303
- Melvin A. Brannon (1937) Algae and growth substances. Science, October 1937, pages 353–354 (while at University of Wisconsin)
- Melvin A. Brannon (1932) The Montana System Administering Higher Education. School & Society 35 no. 896 page 270

== Head coaching record ==
Year	Team	Overall	Conference	Standing	Bowl/playoffs
North Dakota Flickertails (Independent) (1897–1898)
1897	North Dakota	2–1			
1898	North Dakota	1–2			
North Dakota:		3–3			
Total:		3–3			

== Awards and legacy ==
Brannon was awarded honorary degrees by Whitman College (LL.D., 1917), Wabash College (LLD., 1932), Montana State College (LL.D., 1936) and the University of North Dakota (D.Sc., 1947). In the 1960s a new student residence building at University of North Dakota was named after Brannon. The library at University of North Dakota houses Brannon's papers and information related to his administrative roles. The University of Florida Herbarium holds 60 alagal specimens that Brannon collected.

== Personal life ==
Bannon was married three times. He first married Lida Lowry, who died in 1919. They had two daughters together. He remarried in 1923 to the widowed Anna Lytle Tannahill. The marriage ended with her death in 1934. He was married for a third time to Yvonne Tissler in 1938, and this was ended by his death.
