= John H. Rice (American football) =

Playing career
- 1896: Wisconsin

Coaching career (HC unless noted)
- 1897: Alma

Head coaching record
- Overall: 4–2

John H. Rice was an American college football coach, college administrator, and professor. He served as the athletic director and head football coach at Alma College in 1897.

== Early life and education ==
Rice attended Lake Forest University, and graduated in 1895 with a Bachelor of Arts degree. He then pursued postgraduate studies at the University of Wisconsin, where he played on the varsity football and baseball teams. He graduated from Wisconsin in 1896.

== Administrative and coaching career ==
In 1897, Alma College in Alma, Michigan hired Rice as its director of athletics and to handle coaching duties. At Alma, he also served as a professor of physical training, rhetoric, and general history. Rice coached the football tea Rice left Alma after the 1897–98 academic year.

== Head coaching record ==
Year	Team	Overall	Conference	Standing	Bowl/playoffs
Alma Maroon and Cream (Independent) (1897)
1897	Alma	4–2			
Alma:		4–2			
Total:		4–2			
