= Roger Thomas (American football coach) =

American football coach

Biographical details
- Born: August 19, 1947 (age 79); Chicago, Illinois, U.S.

Playing career

Football
- c. 1967: Augustana (SD)
- Positions: Running back, quarterback

Coaching career (HC unless noted)

Football
- 1969–1975: Augustana (SD) (assistant)
- 1976–1977: Sioux Falls
- 1978–1979: North Dakota (OC)
- 1980–1982: Cal State Fullerton (AHC/OC)
- 1983: Minnesota (offensive backfield)
- 1984–1985: Toronto Argonauts (offensive backfield / receivers)
- 1986–1998: North Dakota

Baseball
- 1973: Augustana (SD)

Administrative career (AD unless noted)
- 1999–2005: North Dakota
- 2005–2008: NCC (commissioner)
- 2008–2017: Mary

Head coaching record
- Overall: 91–60–2 (football); 6–18 (baseball)
- Tournaments: Football; 4–4 (NCAA D-II playoffs)

Accomplishments and honors

Championships
- Football; NCC (1993–1995)

Roger Thomas (born August 19, 1947 in Chicago, Illinois) is a former American college athletics administrator and American football coach. He was the athletic director at the University of Mary from 2008 to 2017. Thomas was previously the head football coach at Sioux Falls College—now known as the University of Sioux Falls—from 1976 to 1977 and at the University of North Dakota from 1986 to 1998. He was also the athletic director at North Dakota from 1999 to 2005. Subsequently, he served as the commissioner of the NCAA Division II's North Central Conference (NCC) from 2005 until the conference's demise in 2008.

== Head coaching record ==
=== Football ===
Year	Team	Overall	Conference	Standing	Bowl/playoffs
Sioux Falls Braves (Tri-State Conference) (1976–1977)
1976	Sioux Falls	1–5			
1977	Sioux Falls	0–6			
Sioux Falls:		1–11			
North Dakota Fighting Sioux (North Central Conference) (1986–1998)
1986	North Dakota	2–9	2–7	9th	
1987	North Dakota	6–4	5–4	T–4th	
1988	North Dakota	7–4	5–4	T–4th	
1989	North Dakota	3–7–1	2–6–1	9th	
1990	North Dakota	7–3	7–2	2nd	
1991	North Dakota	7–2	6–2	T–2nd	
1992	North Dakota	6–4–1	6–2–1	2nd	L NCAA Division II First Round
1993	North Dakota	10–3	7–2	T–1st	L NCAA Division II Semifinal
1994	North Dakota	10–3	7–2	T–1st	L NCAA Division II Semifinal
1995	North Dakota	9–2	8–1	1st	L NCAA Division II First Round
1996	North Dakota	7–3	6–3	T–2nd	
1997	North Dakota	8–2	7–2	T–2nd	
1998	North Dakota	8–3	7–2	3rd	L NCAA Division II First Round
North Dakota:		90–49–2	75–39–2		
Total:		91–60–2			
National championship Conference title Conference division title or championship game berth
