= Marvin C. Helling =

American football player and coach (1923–2014)

Biographical details
- Born: May 16, 1923; Luverne, Minnesota, U.S.
- Died: November 30, 2014 (aged 91); Englewood, Florida, U.S.

Playing career
- 1941–1942: Macalester
- 1946–1947: Macalester
- Position: Back

Coaching career (HC unless noted)
- 1948: Jackson HS (MN) (assistant)
- 1948–1953: Detroit Lakes HS (MN)
- 1954–1956: Minneapolis Washburn HS (MN)
- 1957–1967: North Dakota

Head coaching record
- Overall: 60–35–3 (college)
- Bowls: 2–0

Accomplishments and honors

Championships
- 3 NCC (1958, 1964, 1966)

Marvin C. "Whitey" Helling (May 16, 1923 – November 30, 2014) was an American football player and coach. He served as the head football coach at the University of North Dakota from 1957 to 1967, compiling a record of 60–35–3. Helling led the Fighting Sioux to victories in the 1965 Mineral Water Bowl and 1966 Pecan Bowl. During World War II, he served in the United States Navy and commanded a gunboat in the Pacific theater.

== Head coaching record ==
=== College ===
Year	Team	Overall	Conference	Standing	Bowl/playoffs
North Dakota Fighting Sioux (North Central Conference) (1957–1967)
1957	North Dakota	3–4–1	2–3–1	5th	
1958	North Dakota	5–3	5–1	1st	
1959	North Dakota	2–5–1	1–4–1	7th	
1960	North Dakota	4–3–1	4–2	T–2nd	
1961	North Dakota	6–3	4–2	T–3rd	
1962	North Dakota	5–4	3–3	4th	
1963	North Dakota	6–3	4–2	T–2nd	
1964	North Dakota	8–1	5–1	T–1st	
1965	North Dakota	9–1	5–1	2nd	W Mineral Water
1966	North Dakota	8–2	5–1	T–1st	W Pecan
1967	North Dakota	4–6	4–2	3rd	
North Dakota:		60–35–3	42–22–2		
Total:		60–35–3			
National championship Conference title Conference division title or championship game berth
