= Harry C. Loomis =

American football player and coach

Biographical details
- Born: October 19, 1876; Charles City, Iowa, U.S.

Playing career
- 1896–1898: Minnesota
- Position: Fullback

Coaching career (HC unless noted)
- 1899: North Dakota
- 1902: North Dakota

Head coaching record
- Overall: 9–2–2

Harry Charles Loomis (born October 19, 1876) was an American college football player and coach. He served as the head football coach at the University of North Dakota in 1899 and 1902, compiling a record of 9–2–2.

== Head coaching record ==
Year	Team	Overall	Conference	Standing	Bowl/playoffs
North Dakota Flickertails (Independent) (1899)
1899	North Dakota	6–0			
North Dakota Flickertails (Independent) (1902)
1902	North Dakota	3–3–2			
North Dakota:		9–2–2			
Total:		9–2–2			
