= Adolph F. Bechdolt =

American football coach

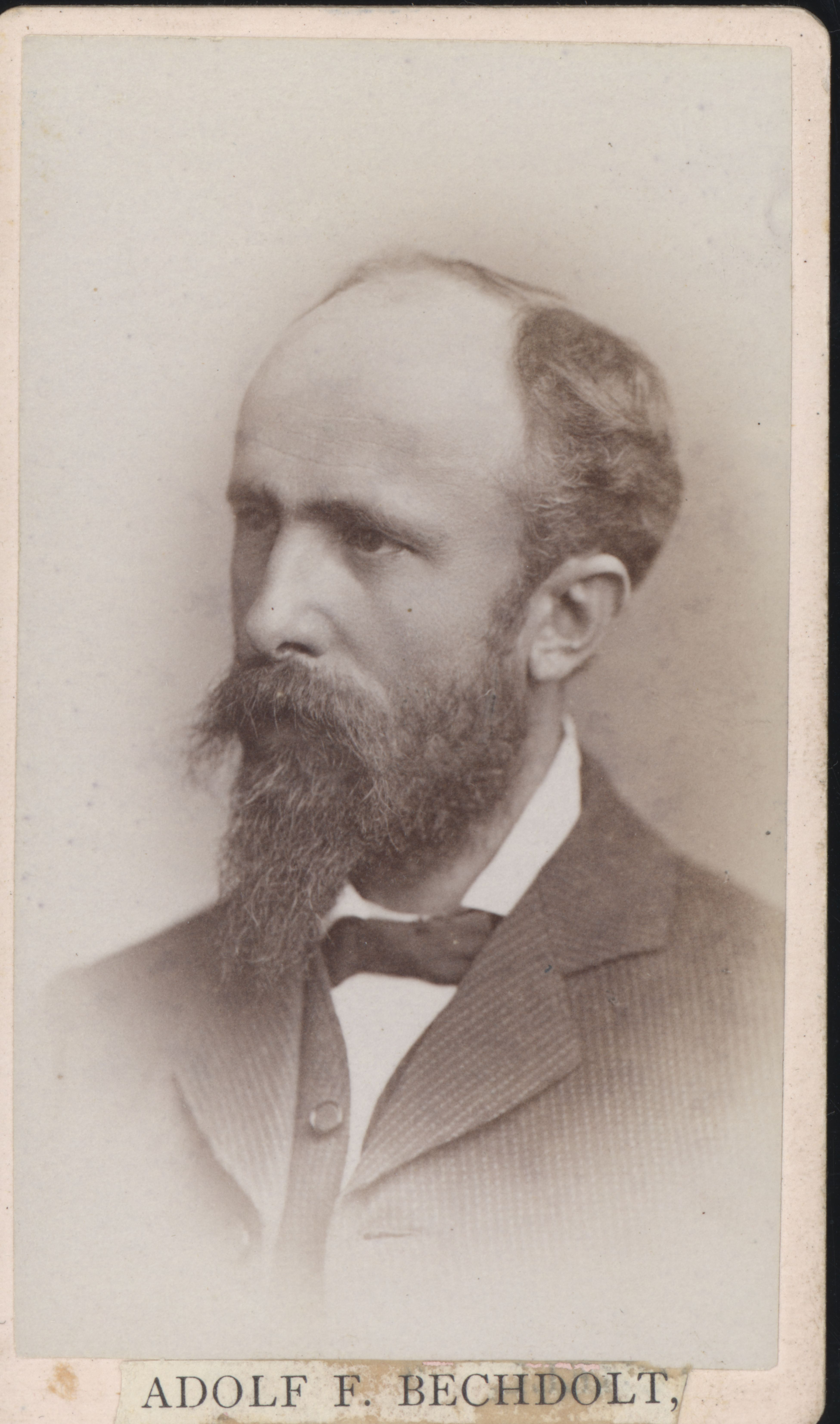
- Bechdolt, 1885

Biographical details
- Born: November 16, 1846; Reutlingen, Kingdom of Württemberg
- Died: June 6, 1938 (aged 91); Carmel-by-the-Sea, California, U.S.
- Education: Lafayette College; Franklin & Marshall College

Coaching career (HC unless noted)
- 1894: North Dakota

Head coaching record
- Overall: 2–2

Adolph Frederick Bechdolt (November 16, 1846 – May 6, 1938) was a Kingdom of Württemberg-born American college football coach and educator. He was the first football coach for the University of North Dakota, serving for one season, in 1894, and compiling a record of 2–2. Bechdolt was also a professor of English at the university from 1892 to 1895.

Born in the Kingdom of Württemberg, Bechdolt moved at the age of six with his family to Pennsylvania. He attended Lafayette College, from which he earned a Bachelor of Arts degree in 1866 and a Master of Arts degree in 1869. He received a Doctor of Philosophy degree from Franklin & Marshall College in 1890.

Bechdolt began teaching in 1869 at Mercersburg Academy—now known as Mercersburg College—in Mercersburg, Pennsylvania. He was a professor of chemistry and German there until 1876. From 1876 to 1880 and again from 1885 to 1892, Bocholt served as superintendent of city schools in Mankato, Minnesota. In the interim, from 1880 to 1885, he was a professor of chemistry at Mankato Normal School—now known as Minnesota State University, Mankato. In 1895, Bechdolt became a professor of English language and literature at the University of Washington. Bechdolt was appointed the superintendent of schools in Eugene, Oregon in 1901. He then taught at Whatcom High School in Bellingham, Washington for 19 years, serving successively at head of the school's English, foreign language, and history departments before resigning in 1923.

Bechdolt was the father of two well-known writers, Frederick R. Bechdolt (1874–1950) and Jack Bechdolt (1884–1954). He died suddenly, on May 6, 1938, in Carmel-by-the-Sea, California.

== Head coaching record ==
Year	Team	Overall	Conference	Standing	Bowl/playoffs
North Dakota Flickertails (Independent) (1894)
1894	North Dakota	2–2			
North Dakota:		2–2			
Total:		2–2			
