= Chris Mussman =

American football player and coach (born 1968)

Biographical details
- Born: July 12, 1968 (age 58); Owatonna, Minnesota, U.S.

Playing career
- 1987–1990: Iowa State
- Position: Offensive lineman

Coaching career (HC unless noted)
- 1993–1998: Minnesota State (OL/OC)
- 1999–2007: North Dakota (OC/OL)
- 2008–2013: North Dakota
- 2014–2019: St. Cloud State (co-OC/QB)

Head coaching record
- Overall: 31–34

Accomplishments and honors

Championships
- 1 GWC (2011)

Awards
- GWC Coach of the Year (2011)

Christopher Mussman (born July 12, 1968) is an American football coach and former player. He served as head football coach at the University of North Dakota from 2008 to 2013, compiling a record of 31–34. In March 2014. Mussman was hired as the co-offensive coordinator and quarterbacks coach at St. Cloud State University.

Mussman was a four-year letter-winner and starting offensive lineman at Iowa State University from 1987 to 1990. He earned a bachelor's degree from Iowa State in 1991 and a master's degree from Minnesota State University, Mankato in 1994. Mussman was hired as the 25th head coach of the Fighting Sioux on January 4, 2008. After bringing his team back from a 20-point deficit against South Dakota, Mussman was named Great West Conference Coach of the Year.

== Head coaching record ==
Year	Team	Overall	Conference	Standing	Bowl/playoffs
North Dakota Fighting Sioux (Great West Conference) (2008–2011)
2008	North Dakota	6–4	1–2	3rd	
2009	North Dakota	6–5	2–2	T–2nd	
2010	North Dakota	3–8	0–4	5th	
2011	North Dakota	8–3	3–1	T–1st	
North Dakota (Big Sky Conference) (2012–2013)
2012	North Dakota	5–6	3–5	T–8th	
2013	North Dakota	3–8	2–6	10th	
North Dakota:		31–34	11–20		
Total:		31–34			
National championship Conference title Conference division title or championship game berth
