= Red Jarrett =

American football and basketball coach (1907–1962)

Biographical details
- Born: October 23, 1907; Ligonier, Indiana, U.S.
- Died: April 26, 1962 (aged 54)

Playing career

Football
- 1928–1931: North Dakota

Football
- 1928–1931: North Dakota

Coaching career (HC unless noted)

Football
- 1938–1941: North Dakota (assistant)
- 1942: North Dakota
- 1946–1948: North Dakota

Basketball
- 1945–1946: North Dakota
- 1949–1951: North Dakota

Administrative career (AD unless noted)
- 1946–1958: North Dakota

Head coaching record
- Overall: 14–17 (football); 39–26 (basketball)

Glenn LeRoy "Red" Jarrett (October 23, 1907 – April 26, 1962) was an American football and basketball coach. He served as the head football coach at the University of North Dakota in 1942 and from 1946 to 1948, compiling a record of 14–17. Jarret was also the head basketball coach at North Dakota in 1945–46 and from 1949 to 1951, tallying a mark of 39–26.

== Head coaching record ==
=== Football ===
Year	Team	Overall	Conference	Standing	Bowl/playoffs
North Dakota Fighting Sioux (North Central Conference) (1942)
1942	North Dakota	3–3	2–3	T–5th	
North Dakota Fighting Sioux (North Central Conference) (1946–1948)
1946	North Dakota	4–3	2–2	4th	
1947	North Dakota	4–4	2–2	4th	
1948	North Dakota	3–7	3–3	3rd	
North Dakota:		14–17	9–10		
Total:		14–17			
