= Davis, Illinois =

Davis
- Village
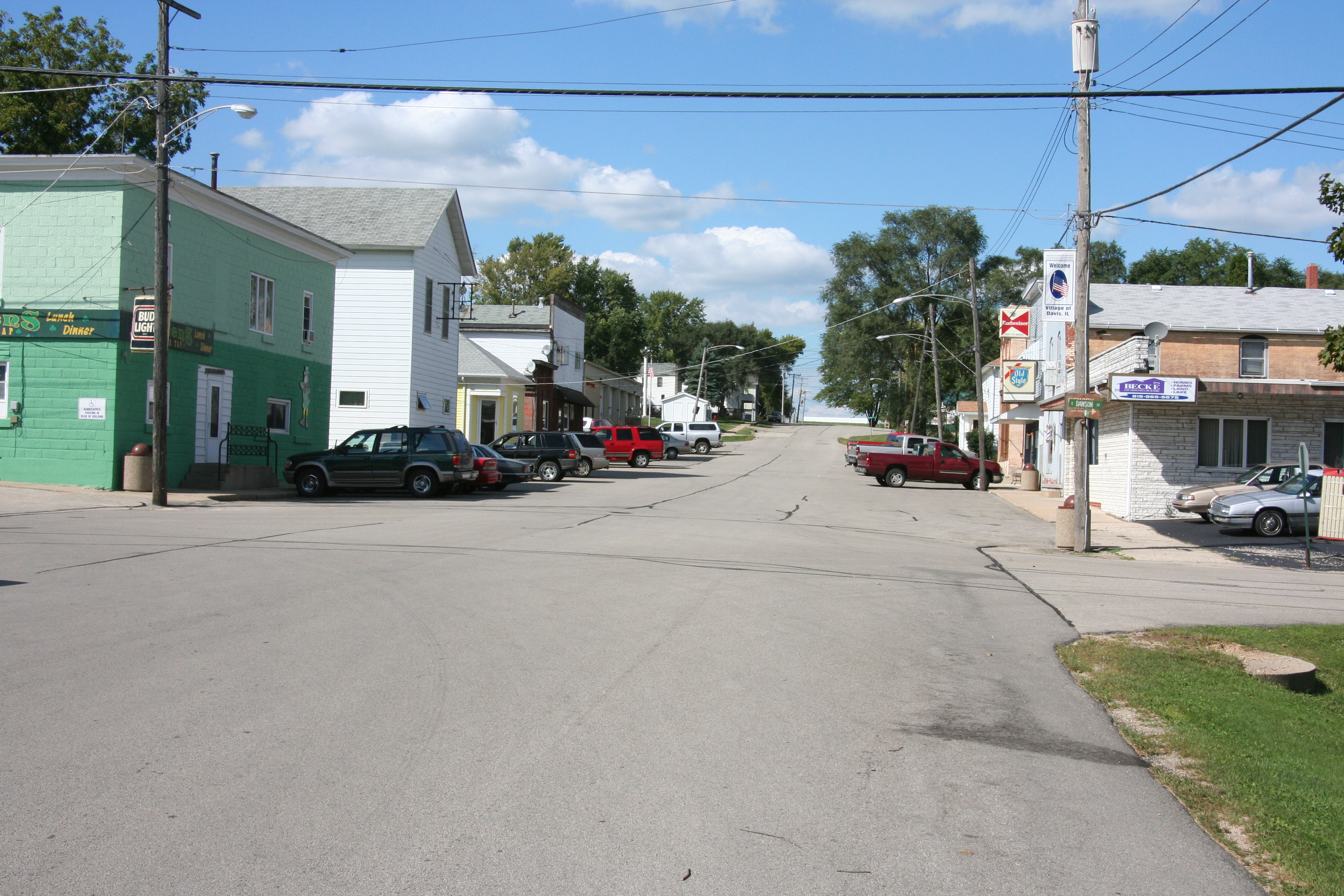
- Downtown Davis

- Location of Davis in Stephenson County, Illinois.
- Coordinates: 42°25′18″N 89°24′54″W
- Country: United States
- State: Illinois
- County: Stephenson
- Township: Rock Run

Area
  - Total: 0.41 sq mi (1.05 km^{2})
  - Land: 0.41 sq mi (1.05 km^{2})
  - Water: 0 sq mi (0.00 km^{2})
- Elevation: 879 ft (268 m)

Population (2020)
  - Total: 589
  - Density: 1,453.5/sq mi (561.19/km^{2})
- Time zone: UTC-6 (CST)
  - Summer (DST): UTC-5 (CDT)
- ZIP code: 61019
- Area code: 815
- FIPS code: 17-18706
- GNIS feature ID: 2398687
- Website: villageofdavis.com

Davis is a village in Stephenson County, Illinois, United States. As of the 2020 census, Davis had a population of 589.

== History ==
Davis was founded in the 1850s when the railroad was extended to that point. The village was named for one of its founders, S. J. Davis. A post office has been in operation at Davis since 1858.

== Geography ==
According to the 2010 census, Davis has a total area of 0.43 square miles (1.11 km^{2}), all land.

== Demographics ==
Historical population
Census	Pop.	Note	%±
1880	539		—
1890	455		−15.6%
1900	398		−12.5%
1910	352		−11.6%
1920	337		−4.3%
1930	311		−7.7%
1940	317		1.9%
1950	348		9.8%
1960	434		24.7%
1970	525		21.0%
1980	560		6.7%
1990	541		−3.4%
2000	662		22.4%
2010	677		2.3%
2020	589		−13.0%
U.S. Decennial Census

As of the census of 2000, there were 662 people, 254 households, and 180 families residing in the village. The population density was 1,546.7 inhabitants per square mile (597.2/km^{2}). There were 266 housing units at an average density of 621.5 per square mile (240.0/km^{2}). The racial makeup of the village was 98.64% White, 0.30% African American, 0.15% Asian, 0.15% from other races, and 0.76% from two or more races. Hispanic or Latino of any race were 1.21% of the population.

There were 254 households, out of which 37.8% had children under the age of 18 living with them, 60.2% were married couples living together, 7.1% had a female householder with no husband present, and 29.1% were non-families. 26.0% of all households were made up of individuals, and 14.6% had someone living alone who was 65 years of age or older. The average household size was 2.61 and the average family size was 3.14.

In the village, the population was spread out, with 29.9% under the age of 18, 7.4% from 18 to 24, 29.5% from 25 to 44, 20.8% from 45 to 64, and 12.4% who were 65 years of age or older. The median age was 34 years. For every 100 females, there were 98.8 males. For every 100 females age 18 and over, there were 94.1 males.

The median income for a household in the village was $45,385, and the median income for a family was $51,538. Males had a median income of $38,971 versus $22,250 for females. The per capita income for the village was $18,595. About 3.8% of families and 7.1% of the population were below the poverty line, including 7.0% of those under age 18 and 9.7% of those age 65 or over.

== Education ==
It is in the Dakota Community Unit School District 201.
