= David L. Dunlap =

American physician

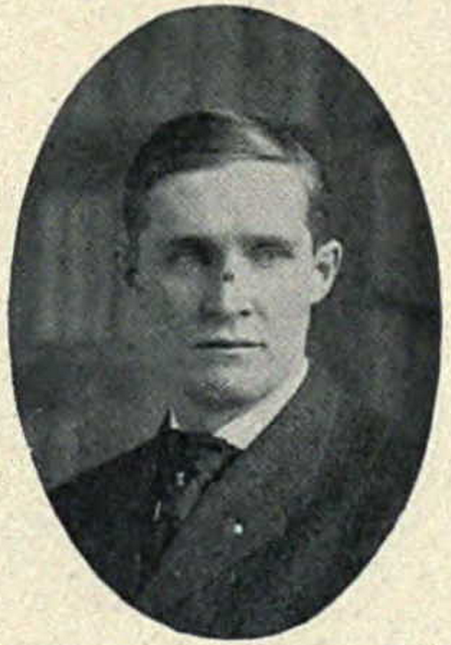
- Dunlap from 1906 Michiganensian

Biographical details
- Born: December 7, 1877; Iowa, U.S.
- Died: July 9, 1954 (aged 76)

Playing career

Football
- 1901–1903: Michigan
- 1905: Michigan
- Positions: End, halfback

Coaching career (HC unless noted)

Football
- 1906: Kenyon
- 1908–1911: North Dakota
- 1912: Allegheny

Basketball
- 1908–1912: North Dakota
- 1912–1913: Allegheny

Baseball
- 1910: North Dakota

Administrative career (AD unless noted)
- 1906–1907: Kenyon
- 1907–1908: Michigan Military Academy
- 1908–1912: North Dakota
- 1912–1913: Allegheny

Head coaching record
- Overall: 16–16–5 (football); 42–19 (basketball); 3–6–1 (baseball)

David Lewis Dunlap (December 7, 1877 – July 9, 1954) was an American football player and coach of football, basketball, and baseball, athletics administrator, and physician. He played football for the University of Michigan's "Point-a-Minute" teams from 1901 to 1903 and 1905. Dunlap was the head football coach and athletic director at Kenyon College in 1906, at the University of North Dakota from 1907 to 1911, and at Allegheny College in 1912. He also coached basketball and baseball at North Dakota and basketball at Allegheny.

== Early years ==
Dunlap was born in Iowa in 1877. His father, James B. Dunlap, was a farmer who immigrated to the United States from Ireland as a boy in 1847. Dunlap's mother, Clara M. Dunlap, was a New York native. They settled in Hazel Green Township, Delaware County, Iowa, near Hopkinton, Iowa. Dunlap had five older brothers and two older sisters.

Dunlap attended college at Lenox College in Hopkinton, Iowa. He received a B.S. degree from Lenox in 1901.

== University of Michigan ==
After graduating from Lenox, Dunlap enrolled in the Department of Medicine and Surgery at the University of Michigan. He received his Doctor of Medicine degree in 1906. While attending medical school, Dunlap played football for the Michigan Wolverines football team for four years from 1901 to 1903 and 1905. He appeared in five games (Case, Albion, Beloit, Ohio Normal, Ferris) at right end (and was a starter in one game) for the 1903 team. Two years later, he was a starter at halfback in four games (including the Kalamazoo and Case games) for the 1905 team. During the 1905 season, a controversy developed as to Dunlap's eligibility. He had participated in athletics at Lenox College, and some questioned whether he had a remaining fourth year of eligibility. A letter was received from the person in charge of athletics at Iowa indicating that the Association of Colleges in Iowa did not consider Lenox to be a college. The conference ruled that Dunlap remained eligible on the ground that Lenox was not a college.

Dunlap was also a member of Michigan's varsity track team for four years. During the 1905–06 academic year, he also served as a student member of the Board of Control in charge of the general supervision of athletic sports at the University of Michigan.

== Coaching career ==
In the fall of 1906, Dunlap was hired as the football coach and athletic director at Kenyon College in Gambier, Ohio. His 1906 football team tallied a record of 1–4–2. After one year at Kenyon, he accepted a similar position at the Orchard Military Academy.

From 1908 to 1911, Dunlap was the head football coach at the University of North Dakota. In four years at North Dakota, he had a record of 14–7–2. He also coached North Dakota's baseball team to a 3–6–1 record in 1910.

In August 1912, Dunlap was hired by Allegheny College as its physical and athletic director. At the time of his hiring, the Boston Evening Transcript wrote:

"Dr. Dunlap is thirty-four years of age and stands six feet. He was under Yost for three years at Michigan in football, and has also acquired a good reputation as a coach. He also has a record in track. Apart from his all-around ability as physical director, Dr. Dunlap's greatest strength seems to be as coach in football and trainer in track."

He later returned to North Dakota as its athletic director.

== Family and later years ==
In September 1913, Dunlap married Lulu Elta Loomis at Ypsilanti, Michigan. In a draft registration card completed in September 1918, Dunlap indicated that he was living in Highland Park, Michigan with his. He was a self-employed physician with an office in the Kresge Building in Detroit. At the time of the 1920 United States census, Dunlap was still in private practice as a physician and living with his wife in Highland Park. By that time, they had two sons David (age 4) and Gregg (age 2). Ten years later, Dunlap and his wife remained living in Highland Park, and Dunlap continued in private practice as a physician. By that time, they had four children, Ward (age 15), David (14), Gregg (age 13) and Jean (age 6).

== Head coaching record ==
=== Football ===
Year	Team	Overall	Conference	Standing	Bowl/playoffs
Kenyon Lords (Ohio Athletic Conference) (1906)
1906	Kenyon	1–4–2	0–2–2	6th	
Kenyon:		1–4–2	0–2–2		
North Dakota Flickertails (Independent) (1908–1911)
1908	North Dakota	5–2			
1909	North Dakota	4–0–1			
1910	North Dakota	3–3			
1911	North Dakota	2–2–1			
North Dakota:		14–7–2			
Allegheny Gators (Western Pennsylvania and West Virginia Intercollegiate Athletic Association) (1912)
1912	Allegheny	1–5–1	1–3	T–4th	
Allegheny:		1–5–1	1–3		
Total:		16–16–5			
