= Fred V. Archer =

American sports coach

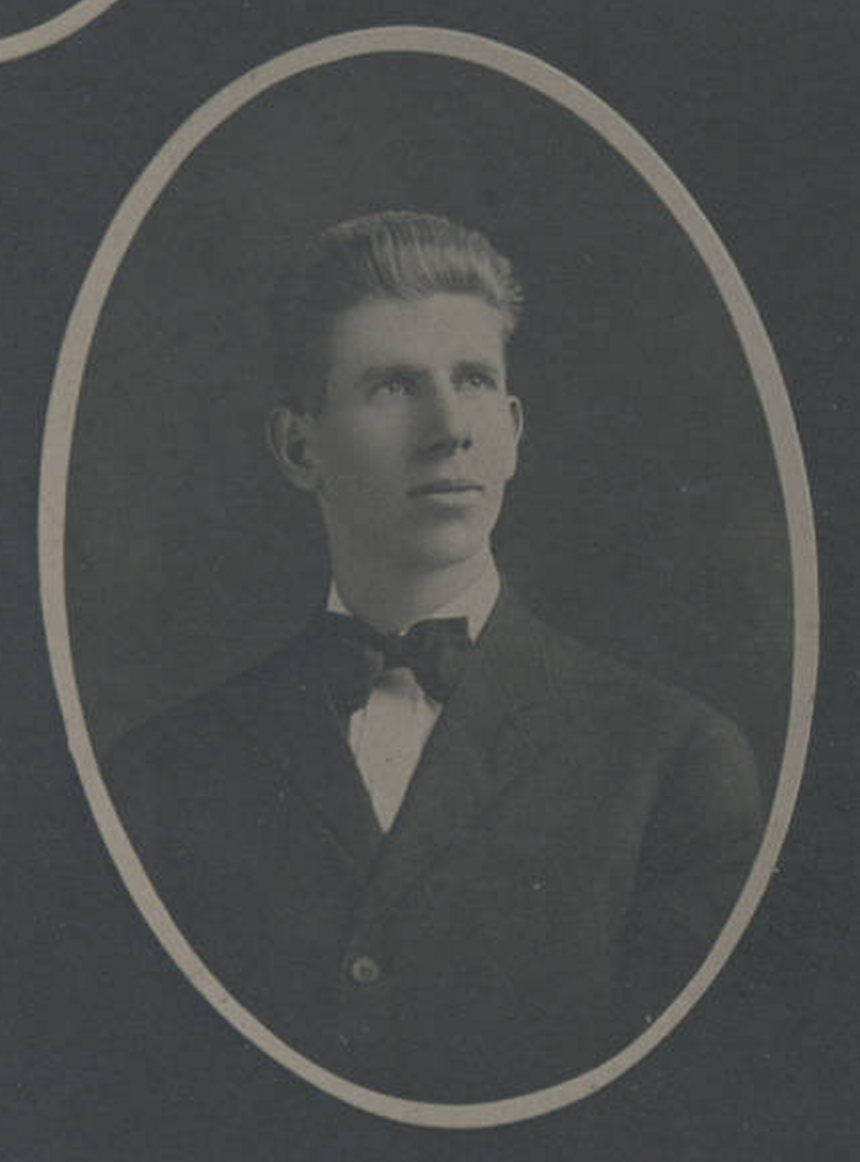
- Fred Archer pictured in Ravone 1909, Hanover yearbook

Biographical details
- Born: October 6, 1888; Vevay, Indiana, U.S.
- Died: January 1971 (aged 82); Winchester, Massachusetts, U.S.
- Education: Hanover College (1910)

Coaching career (HC unless noted)

Football
- 1913: North Dakota

Basketball
- 1913–1914: North Dakota

Head coaching record
- Overall: 2–4 (football); 10–7 (basketball)

Fred Van Buren Archer (October 6, 1888 – January 1971) was the head football coach for the University of North Dakota Fighting Sioux football team. He compiled an overall record of 2–4. He was born in Vevay, Indiana in 1888.

Archer was from Ottawa, Illinois He was a graduate of Hanover College, having received a Bachelor of Science degree there in 1910. He was also a member of the Phi Gamma Delta fraternity during his college years.

Before coming to North Dakota, Archer taught at a school in McCook, Nebraska and later, in 1912, chemistry and physics at Ottawa, Illinois. He married Gladys Richardson in Boston, Massachusetts, on June 1, 1914. Archer was living in Lexington, Massachusetts in 1925. He died at Winchester, Massachusetts in 1971.

== Head coaching record ==
Year	Team	Overall	Conference	Standing	Bowl/playoffs
North Dakota Flickertails (Independent) (1913)
1913	North Dakota	2–4			
North Dakota:		2–4			
Total:		2–4			
