= George Sweetland =

American physician

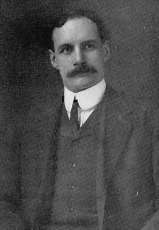
- Sweetland, c. 1912

Biographical details
- Born: August 5, 1872; Dryden, New York, U.S.
- Died: March 29, 1954 (aged 81); Constantine, Michigan, U.S.

Playing career

Football
- 1893–1895: Union (NY)
- 1896: Hobart
- Positions: Center, fullback

Coaching career (HC unless noted)

Football
- 1898: Alma
- 1899: Iowa State Normal
- 1901–1902: Ishpeming HS (MI)
- 1904–1907: North Dakota
- 1908: Everett HS (WA)
- 1909–1913: Willamette
- 1914–1915: Hobart

Basketball
- 1904–1908: North Dakota
- 1915–1916: Hobart

Administrative career (AD unless noted)
- 1904–1908: North Dakota

Head coaching record
- Overall: 46–22–5 (college football)

George James Sweetland (August 5, 1872 – March 29, 1954) was an American physician as well as a coach of many sports including basketball, track and field and football at several universities.

== Early life ==
Sweetland was born in Dryden, New York on August 5, 1872. He was the fifth child of George James and Hannah Marsh Sweetland. He is the brother of Monroe Marsh Sweetland, who founded Delta Chi fraternity and Edwin Sweetland noted college football coach.

He graduated from Dryden Academy, and went on to attend Union College in Schenectady, New York. At Union, Sweetland played fullback and center on the football team and was named captain of the team in 1896 season. He transferred to Hobart College in Geneva, New York where he graduated with a Bachelor of Letters in 1897. At Hobart he was a member of Phi Gamma Delta fraternity as well as earning a letter in football in 1896. Over the next few years Sweetland gained addition education and advanced degrees. He received a master's degree at Chautauqua School of Physical Education in Chautauqua, New York and graduated from the Grand Rapids Medical College—now part of the University of Michigan Medical School. Sweetland served at the front with a unit from Michigan during the Spanish–American War. After the war he finished his medical training and started his coaching career.

== Coaching career ==
After Sweetland returned from the war, but before he was officially mustered out of service, he served as coach of Alma College football team. George B. Wells a student got the Alma football team ready before the season with Sweetland taking over once the season started.

Sweetland served as the head football coach at Iowa State Normal School—now known as the University of Northern Iowa—in 1899.

In 1901 he took over the coaching duties at Ishpeming High School in Ishpeming, Michigan. He took over a team that had just won the state championship. He continued the school's winning ways by coaching Ishpeming to the state championship in 1901 and 1902. In his first season his team was declared the best team in the Upper Peninsula of Michigan and was invited to play in the Michigan's State Championship Game sponsored by State Athletic Committee and the Interscholastic Department of the University Athletic Association. His team faced Kalamazoo High School, the Lower Peninsula champion, who outweighed Ishpeming by 30 pounds a man. Ishpeming won by a score of 27–21. The following year, they beat another larger team in the State Championship Game by defeating Benton Harbor High School by a score of 35–12. Earlier in the season one of Benton Harbor's coaches received special access to Sweetland's team by claiming to be a reporter from the Milwaukee Sentinel. Sweetland got wind of the deception and let it continue. When his team played Benton Harbor in the state championship, Sweetland had totally changed his formations and attack. This confused his opponent and allowed Ishpeming to take an early lead from which Benton Harbor could not recover. After watching Ishpeming victory over Benton Harbor, University of Michigan head coach Fielding H. Yost called Sweetland's team the "finest [High] School team he ever saw." Sweetland later credited Ishpeming's success to the "superb physical condition" of his players from working long hours in the mines during the summer and many hours of practice.

Sweetland left Ishpeming and take over the Department of Hygiene at the University of North Dakota. Part of his duties was to be in charge of the University Athletics including coaching the football and basketball teams. His football team won three state titles. He coached the basketball team from 1904 to 1908 and had a career record of 29 wins and 3 losses.

In 1908 Sweetland moved to the Pacific Northwest to pursue his interest in fruit tree cultivation. While there he took a job as athletic director and football coach at Everett High School in Washington. He transformed the team into winners and brought them financial stability. He coached the Everett High School for one season losing only one game.

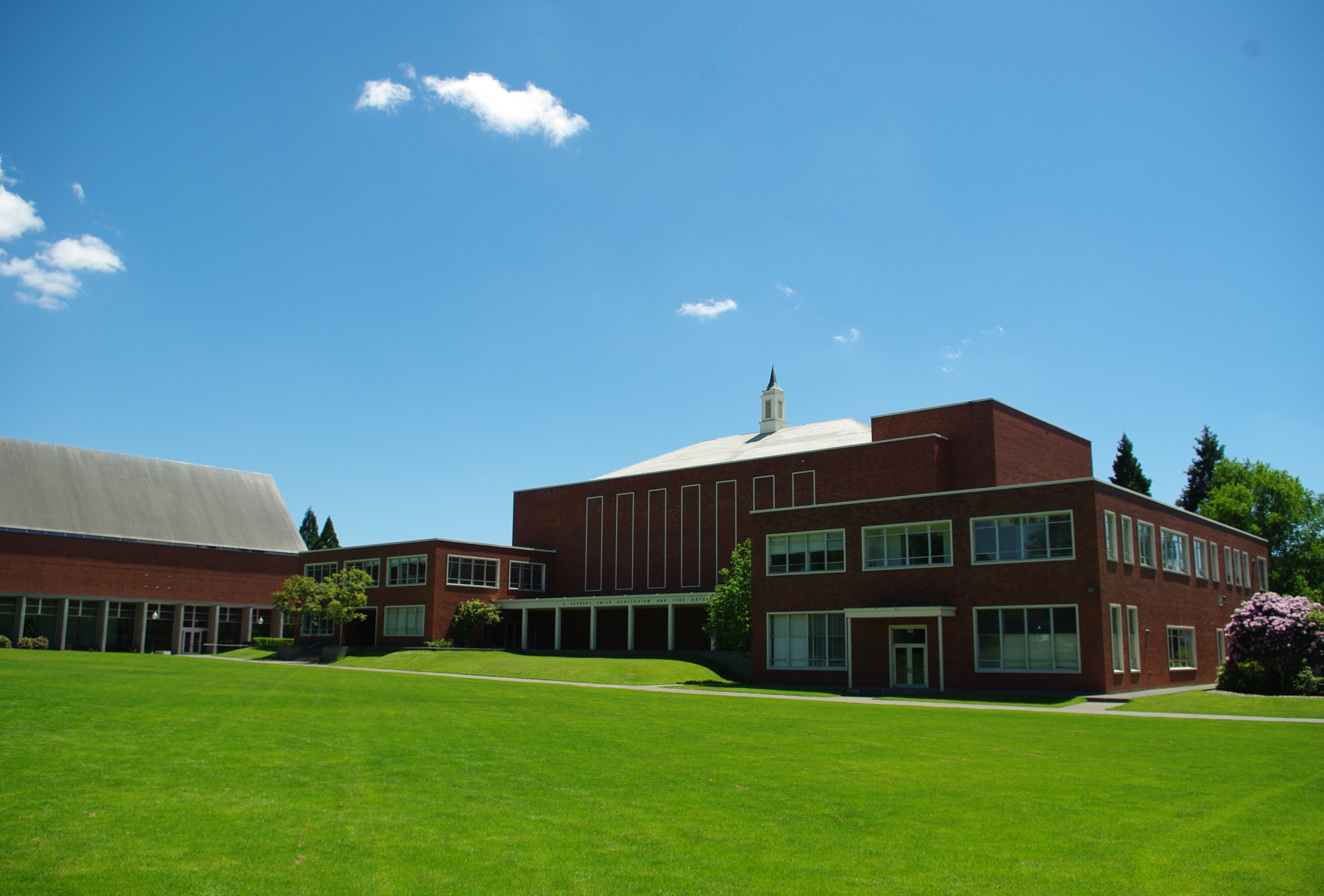
The Quad at Willamette, the former site of Sweetland Field named after George Sweetland

On the recommendation of Yost, Willamette University in Salem, Oregon hired Sweetland as athletic director and football coach. He coached the football team from 1909 to 1913 for a combined record of 20 wins and 4 losses. Throughout his tenure as coach he consistently won even with smaller and less talented players. Many times his team were smaller than high school team in the area. At Willamette he was known for taking ordinary talent and making very strong team. The most notable win was in his last year when his Willamette team beat University of Oregon by a score of 6–3. After the victory over Oregon, Willamette named the athletic field after Sweetland. By end of tenure at Willamette, there was a lot of speculation that he would be hired away by larger colleges in the Pacific Northwest including the University of Washington and the University of Oregon. In the local paper in the city that the University of Oregon was located said that "...If Oregon does not drop her petty feud and secure the services of the doctor, she will have missed one of her golden opportunities." The paper went on to say “…He has done more for athletics at Willamette University than all the athletic directors of Oregon have accomplished together..."

Sweetland did not take a job with another college in the Pacific Northwest. Instead he returned to upstate New York to take a job with Hobart College his alma mater. In 1914 Sweetland was named physical and athletic director at Hobart as well as being in charge of physical training of young women at William Smith College. He was paid approximately $3000 a year to run the athletic department, coaching several sports including football, basketball, and baseball. Hobart President Lyman Powell wanted "...to make the college one of the best in the United States and he is selecting on his faculty the strongest men that can be obtained." In football Sweetland was 1–5 the first year and 5–0–1 in his second year, one of few undefeated seasons in its history. In basketball Sweetland won his first five games with Hobart, winning all four games in 1914–15 and the 1915–16 season opener. No Hobart head basketball coach repeated this feat until Mike Neer on 2011.

== After coaching ==
Sweetland abandoned his coaching career in 1916 due to the death of his brother Dr. John J. Sweetland who was killed in a car accident. He left his position at Hobart moved to Constantine, Michigan to take over the medical practice of his brother. He lived there the rest of his life until he died at Three River Hospital in 1954. He was active in the community and was elected several times to the local school board. While in Constantine he remained active in athletics by donating the money for the high school athletic stadium in the name of his youngest child who died of Polio in 1937. He was also instrumental in creating the Tomahawk Trophy that is played for each year between Constantine High School and White Pigeon High School football teams.

== Family ==
While at University of North Dakota, Sweetland met Mildred Mark and the couple were married in 1906 in Hood River, Oregon. They had three children. The oldest, Monroe Sweetland, was a Democratic National Committee member for Oregon and a member of the Oregon Legislative Assembly. The middle child, Ada, attended college in New York and Chicago and the youngest, George Jr., died of infantile paralysis at age 18.

== Head coaching record ==
=== College football ===
Year	Team	Overall	Conference	Standing	Bowl/playoffs
Alma Maroon and Cream (Independent) (1898)
1898	Alma	1–2			
Alma:		1–2			
Iowa State Normal (Independent) (1899)
1899	Iowa State Normal	1–3–2			
Iowa State Normal:		1–3–2			
North Dakota Flickertails (Independent) (1904–1907)
1904	North Dakota	6–1			
1905	North Dakota	6–1–1			
1906	North Dakota	1–3			
1907	North Dakota	2–2			
North Dakota:		15–7–1			
Willamette Methodists (Independent) (1909–1913)
1909	Willamette	3–1			
1910	Willamette	5–1			
1911	Willamette	5–1			
1912	Willamette	5–1–1			
1913	Willamette	5–0			
Willamette:		23–4–1			
Hobart (Independent) (1914–1915)
1914	Hobart	1–6			
1915	Hobart	5–0–1			
Hobart:		6–6–1			
Total:		46–22–5			
