= Charles A. West =

American sports coach and college athletics administrator

Biographical details
- Born: March 13, 1890; Cherokee, Iowa, U.S.
- Died: October 29, 1957 (aged 67); Grand Forks, North Dakota, U.S.

Coaching career (HC unless noted)

Football
- 1919–1927: South Dakota State
- 1928–1941: North Dakota
- 1945: North Dakota
- 1946–1948: Winnipeg Blue Bombers

Basketball
- 1919–1926: South Dakota State
- 1944–1945: North Dakota

Administrative career (AD unless noted)
- 1928–1946: North Dakota

Head coaching record
- Overall: 134–54–14 (college football); 74–66 (college basketball)

Accomplishments and honors

Championships
- Football; 11 NCC (1922, 1924, 1926, 1928–1931, 1934, 1936–1937, 1939)

Charles Aaron "Jack" West (March 13, 1890 – October 29, 1957) was an American gridiron football and basketball coach and college athletics administrator He served as the head football coach at South Dakota State College of Agricultural and Mechanic Arts—now South Dakota State University—from 1919 to 1927 and at the University of North Dakota from 1928 to 1941 and again in 1945, compiling a career college football gead coaching record of 134–54–14. West was also the head basketball coach at South Dakota State from 1919 to 1926 and at North Dakota during the 1944–45 season, amassing a career college basketball head coaching record of 74–66. He coached football teams to 11 North Central Conference (NCC) titles, three at South Dakota State and eight at North Dakota. In addition, he served as North Dakota's athletic director from 1928 to 1946. West left the college ranks in 1946 to become head coach of the Winnipeg Blue Bombers, then of the Western Interprovincial Football Union, now a division of the Canadian Football League (CFL). He died at the age of 67, on October 29, 1957, at his home in Grand Forks, North Dakota.

== Head coaching record ==
=== College football ===
Year	Team	Overall	Conference	Standing	Bowl/playoffs
South Dakota State Jackrabbits (Independent) (1919–1921)
1919	South Dakota State	4–1–1			
1920	South Dakota State	4–2–1			
1921	South Dakota State	7–1			
South Dakota State Jackrabbits (North Central Conference) (1922–1927)
1922	South Dakota State	5–4–1	4–1–1	1st	
1923	South Dakota State	3–4	2–3	4th	
1924	South Dakota State	7–1	5–0	1st	
1925	South Dakota State	2–3–2	1–1–2	5th	
1926	South Dakota State	8–0–3	3–0–2	1st	
1927	South Dakota State	5–3	2–2	T–3rd	
South Dakota State:		45–19–8	17–7–5		
North Dakota Flickertails / Fighting Sioux (North Central Conference) (1928–1941)
1928	North Dakota	6–1–1	4–0	1st	
1929	North Dakota	9–1	4–0	1st	
1930	North Dakota	9–1	4–0	1st	
1931	North Dakota	8–1–2	4–0	1st	
1932	North Dakota	7–1	2–1	2nd	
1933	North Dakota	3–5–1	1–2–1	3rd	
1934	North Dakota	7–1	3–1	1st	
1935	North Dakota	6–2–2	3–0–2	2nd	
1936	North Dakota	9–2	4–0	1st	
1937	North Dakota	4–4	3–0	1st	
1938	North Dakota	6–2	3–1	2nd	
1939	North Dakota	5–3	4–1	T–1st	
1940	North Dakota	5–4	3–1	2nd	
1941	North Dakota	4–5	3–1	3rd	
North Dakota Fighting Sioux (North Central Conference) (1945)
1945	North Dakota	1–2	NA	NA	
North Dakota:		89–35–6	43–8–3		
Total:		134–54–14			
National championship Conference title Conference division title or championship game berth
