= North Dakota Fighting Hawks football =

Football team for the University of North Dakota

2026 North Dakota Fighting Hawks football team
- First season: 1894; 132 years ago
- Athletic director: Bill Chaves
- Head coach: Eric Schmidt; 2nd season, 14–8 (.636)
- Location: Grand Forks, North Dakota
- Stadium: Alerus Center (capacity: 12,283)
- NCAA division: Division I FCS
- Conference: Missouri Valley
- Colors: Kelly green and white
- All-time record: 694–446–30 (.606)
- Bowl record: 4–0 (1.000)

NCAA Division II championships
- 2001

Conference championships
- NCC: 1928, 1929, 1930, 1931, 1934, 1936, 1937, 1939, 1958, 1964, 1966, 1971, 1972, 1974, 1975, 1979, 1993, 1994, 1995, 1999, 2001, 2003, 2005, 2006 Great West: 2011 Big Sky: 2016 MVFC: 2020
- Rivalries: North Dakota State (Nickel Trophy); South Dakota (Sitting Bull Trophy)

Uniforms
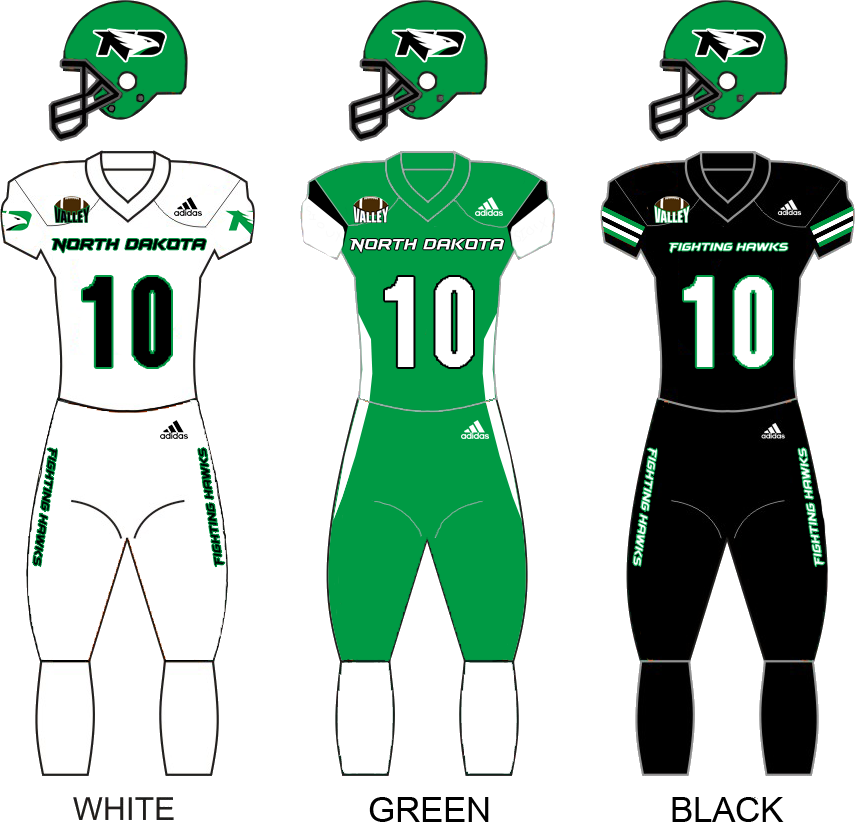
- Fight song: Fight On Sioux; It's For You, North Dakota U Stand Up and Cheer
- Mascot: The Fighting Hawk
- Marching band: Pride of the North
- Uniform outfitter: Adidas
- Website: fightinghawks.com

The North Dakota Fighting Hawks represent the University of North Dakota, competing as a member of the Missouri Valley Football Conference (MVFC) in the NCAA Division I's Football Championship Subdivision. From 1973 to 2008, they played in the NCAA's NCAA Division II, winning the national championship in 2001. From 1955 to 1972, they competed in the NCAA's College Division where they participated in and won three bowl games.

North Dakota fielded its first football team in 1894. In 1922, they were one of the nine charter members of the North Central Conference (NCC), where they competed until 2008 when they upgraded all of their athletic programs to the Division I level and joined the Great West Conference. They joined the Big Sky Conference in 2012. UND has won 26 conference championships, including 14 outright titles. They have qualified for NCAA postseason play 19 times, most recently in 2023. North Dakota was ineligible for post season play during its transition to Division I from 2008 to 2011.

North Dakota left the Big Sky Conference for all sports in 2018, joining the Summit League. Their football program joined the Missouri Valley Football Conference in 2020. Although being classified as an independent for football in 2018 and 2019, they played a full Big Sky schedule with their games counting in the conference standings for their opponents, but the Fighting Hawks were ineligible to compete in the conference championship.

== History ==
=== Charles A. "Jack" West era ===
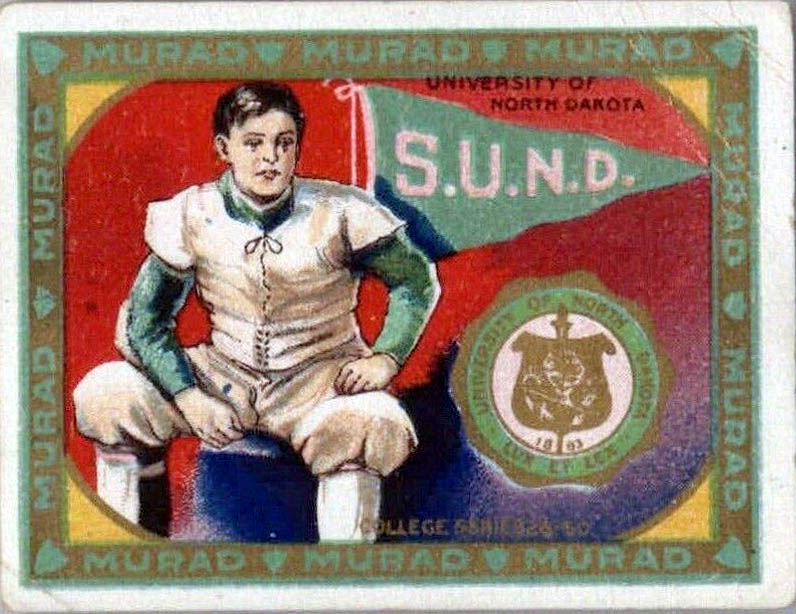
North Dakota football player depicted on a Murad card, 1910

The University of North Dakota football program experienced moderate success from its inception in 1894. In the first 33 years of the program, the Flickertails won 109 games against just 87 losses, and had three undefeated seasons in 1896, 1899, and 1903. But it was in 1928 when Charles A. "Jack" West arrived on campus in Grand Forks that would transform North Dakota into one of the most successful college football programs in the nation. West came to UND from South Dakota State, where he spent 9 successful seasons that included 3 NCC championships. West immediately turned around what was at the time a mediocre football program at UND, winning NCC titles in his first four seasons at the helm.

Over the course of 15 seasons, West amassed a record of 89–35–6, won a total of 8 NCC Championships, and retired as the winningest coach in North Dakota history, a distinction he would hold for 57 years. North Dakota experienced just three losing seasons during West's 15 years as head coach, and won 9 games in a season on three occasions. West did not coach the team in 1942, and the university did not field a team during the war years of 1943 and 1944. His final season was 1945. It was during this era in 1930 that the university adopted the nickname Fighting Sioux for all of its sports teams. West also served as athletic director for North Dakota and was inducted into the UND Hall of Fame in 1975.

=== Marvin Helling era ===
Following Jack West's 15-year tenure as leader of the Fighting Sioux football, the program compiled a record of just 44–44 over the next eleven seasons and did not win an NCC title in that time frame. Marvin C. Helling would change the fortunes of North Dakota and usher in a new era of success for the university. Arriving in 1957, Helling's squad captured the NCC Championship in his second season in 1958, the program's first in 16 seasons. Helling's teams continued to improve as he built his program, reaching its peak from 1964 to 1966. Those three seasons produced a record of 25–4, two NCC Championships, and two Bowl appearances. The 1964 team won Helling's second NCC title behind and 8–1 record. In 1965, the team went 9–1 and played in the Mineral Water Bowl where they soundly defeated Northern Illinois. The only blemish that season came at the hands of their arch rival, the North Dakota State Bison. A 6–3 loss at Dacotah Field in Fargo dashed the national championship hopes for the Fighting Sioux. North Dakota State went on to win the national championship that year. Helling's 1966 team gave him his third NCC championship. They were invited to play in the Pecan Bowl, one of four bowl games used at the time by the NCAA to determine the College Division National Champion. They defeated Parsons College in the game which was on national television as the NCAA's "Game of the Week" and finished the season with an 8–2 record and a No. 5 ranking in the final AP Poll. Four players from the 1966 team would sign contracts with NFL teams. Helling would coach one more season at North Dakota in 1967. In 11 seasons as head coach, he compiled a record of 60–35–3. Helling was inducted into the UND Hall of Fame in 1988.

=== Jerry Olson era ===
Jerry Olson took over the reins of Fighting Sioux football in 1968. After suffering through 3 subpar seasons from 1967 through 1969 that saw the program produce just 11 wins against 21 losses, Olson got the team back on track to its winning ways in 1970, the first of six consecutive winning seasons. The 1971 season produced the first of 4 NCC Championships for Olson. The 1972 season under Olson may very well be considered the high water mark for North Dakota Football. The average margin of victory for the Sioux that season was over 27 points. The eventual NCC Champs defeated traditionally strong opponents such as Montana, Montana State, South Dakota, South Dakota State, and Northern Iowa in dominating fashion as well as adding a victory over UNLV in Las Vegas. The lone defeat that season came at home, a 5-point loss to hated rival, the North Dakota State Bison. This loss would prove very costly to the Sioux. After the regular season, UND was invited to play in the Camellia Bowl, one of four regional bowl games that the NCAA used to determine the College Division National Champion. Entering the game carrying the No. 3 ranking, the Fighting Sioux would meet undefeated and No. 1 ranked Cal Poly. North Dakota would win the game by a rather convincing 17 points, upsetting the favored Mustangs and bolstering their hopes of being awarded the programs first national title. However, the loss to NDSU proved too much to overcome as the pollsters crowned undefeated Delaware as College Division National Champions for the second straight year. For the second time in 7 seasons, a regular season loss to rival NDSU cost the Fighting Sioux a national title. They finished the 1972 campaign ranked No. 2 in the AP Poll. Olson would coach 5 more seasons at North Dakota, adding two more conference titles in 1974 and 1975. With a record of 9–0, the 1975 team was the first UND squad to qualify for the newly created Division II Playoff tournament that replaced the Bowl and polling process of the College Division. North Dakota entered postseason play as the No. 1 ranked team in the nation. They played host to unranked Livingston in the quarterfinals of the playoff where the heavily favored Fighting Sioux were stunned and handed their only loss of the season. Jerry Olson compiled a record of 54–39–4 in 10 seasons at North Dakota and was inducted into the UND Hall of Fame in 1981.

=== 1980s ===
The decade that followed the Jerry Olson era was one of mixed results. Olson's assistant Gene Murphy took over and coached the team in 1978 and 1979. Murphy's 1979 team qualified for the Division II playoffs, but fell in the quarterfinals to Mississippi College finishing the season with a 10–2 record. In 1980, Pat Behrns took over as head coach. Although he amassed a record of 36–27 in six seasons leading the program, North Dakota never qualified for the playoffs nor did they win a conference title under Behrns' direction. Following a dreadful 3–8 season in 1985 that culminated in a 49–0 loss to arch rival NDSU Bison, Behrns resigned as head coach of North Dakota. Roger Thomas was hired to replace him prior to the 1986 season. To add insult to what was already a forgettable decade in the annals of UND football history that yielded no conference titles and no playoff berths, 1980 marked the last time that the Sioux would defeat the rival NDSU Bison until 1993, twelve consecutive meetings.

=== Roger Thomas era ===
Roger Thomas took control of the North Dakota football program prior to the 1986 season. He was previously an assistant in the Canadian Football League and at the University of Minnesota, as well as serving as offensive coordinator on Gene Murphy's staff at North Dakota in 1978 and 1979. Thomas took on the challenge of restoring UND's football program to national prominence. Thomas' approach was slow and methodical. In his first six seasons UND went 38–33–1, finally breaking the playoff drought in 1992 and beginning a string of four consecutive playoff appearances. Thomas' teams seem to steadily improve each year. 1993 proved to be North Dakota's breakout season under Thomas, returning the program to national relevance. UND Defensive Coordinator Dale Lennon had installed a very aggressive 3–4 base defense explicitly designed to thwart the veer offense that was employed by arch rival and national power, the North Dakota State Bison. When the two foes met in 1993, the Fighting Sioux defeated the Bison for the first time since 1980, in a 22–21 thriller, that would prove to turn the balance of power in the North Central Conference for the rest of its existence. The program won the first of three consecutive NCC titles in 1993. North Dakota qualified for the playoffs and advanced all the way to the semifinals before falling to IUP and finishing the season 10–3. 1994 produced another conference championship and another playoff berth for Thomas' squad. As icing on the cake, UND was pitted against NDSU in the 2nd round of the playoffs and were victorious over the Bison for the second time in the same season. North Dakota again advanced to the semifinals before falling to North Alabama and finishing the season with a record of 10–3. The 1995 season resulted in Thomas' third straight conference championship and fourth straight playoff berth. For the second straight season, UND and NDSU would square off against each other in the playoffs. This time it was NDSU that avenged their loss just two weeks prior to North Dakota. The Bison blasted the Sioux 41–10, ending their season. UND finished 1995 with a 9–2 record. Thomas would coach the Fighting Sioux for three more years, qualifying for the playoffs once more in 1998. He stepped down after that season to accept the role of athletic director for the university. Roger Thomas retired after 13 seasons as North Dakota's all-time winningest coach, with a record of 90–49–2.

=== Dale Lennon era ===
After Roger Thomas stepped away from the football field and accepted the position of Athletics Director at North Dakota, he did not have to look far to find his replacement on the sidelines. Longtime Thomas assistant and UND Alum, Dale Lennon was hired as head coach in 1999. Although Lennon had been head coach at the University of Mary the prior two seasons, the coaching transition was virtually seamless since Lennon had spent nine seasons as an assistant under Roger Thomas helping to build North Dakota into the national power that they had become. The Fighting Sioux hit the ground running under Lennon in 1999. They captured the NCC title and secured a berth to the playoffs for the second straight season. No. 9 ranked North Dakota travelled to Northwest Missouri State where they fell in overtime, ending Lennon's first season with a 9–2 record. In 2000, North Dakota went 8–3 in the regular season but were left out of the playoffs. The 2001 season proved to be a magical one for UND. The football program moved into a new state of the art $80 million indoor stadium, the Alerus Center. They breezed through the regular season with just one overtime loss to Nebraska-Omaha on the back of a relentless, swarming defense that gave up just 12 points per game in that season. After capturing the NCC Championship, No. 4 ranked North Dakota reeled of three straight playoff wins in the friendly confines of their new home in front of raucous and deafening crowds. They earned a trip to the national championship game in Florence, Alabama, where they would face No. 2 ranked Grand Valley State who were led by future Notre Dame head coach Brian Kelly. The game had mostly been a defensive battle throughout. Grand Valley had scored with 2:46 to play in the 4th quarter to take 14–10 lead. UND started its next possession, which would simply be known as "The Drive" to North Dakota fans, on their own 20-yard line. After 8 plays, the Sioux found themselves at their own 41-yard line facing a 4th-and-4. On the ensuing play, QB Kelby Klosterman hit WR Luke Schleusner on a short underneath route. Schleusner broke a tackle and broke the play for a 58-yard gain all the way down to the 1 yard line. UND punched it into the endzone on the next play to take the lead with 29 seconds left in the game, securing North Dakota with the national championship.

The team had high hopes heading into 2002 season, but injuries derailed any chances of a repeat title, and instead resulted in a 5–6 record which is the only losing season during Lennon's tenure as head coach. The 2003 version of the Fighting Sioux returned to their dominating form. They had just one loss in the regular season and entered the playoffs as the 7th ranked team in the country. They again hosted and won three straight postseason games in the Alerus Center en route to another berth in the national championship game in Florence, Alabama. They would face the same opponent, No. 4 ranked Grand Valley State. The game had a familiar feel to it. It was low scoring and North Dakota trailed late in the game. QB John Bowenkamp had driven the Sioux 58 yards deep in to GVSU territory on a quest for a potential game tying TD, but was intercepted in the red zone giving the Lakers the victory. UND finished the season with a 12–2 mark. The 2003 season marked the first year in a string of five consecutive playoff seasons for North Dakota. North Dakota met Grand Valley in the playoffs every season from 2003 to 2007, winning just once in 2004 when they advanced to the semifinals. GVSU won 3 national championships during those years. In 2006, Lennon's Division II squad would upset No. 3 ranked Northern Iowa who were a Division I-AA power in a dramatic come from behind win. In 2007, UND routed Division I-AA Southern Utah. Lennon stepped down at North Dakota after the 2007 season to become head coach at DI-AA power Southern Illinois. North Dakota won 4 NCC titles, made 7 playoff appearances, and won a national championship with Lennon at the helm. He left with a record 91–23, surpassing his mentor Roger Thomas, as the all-time winningest coach in school history.

=== Division I transition/Great West Conference era ===
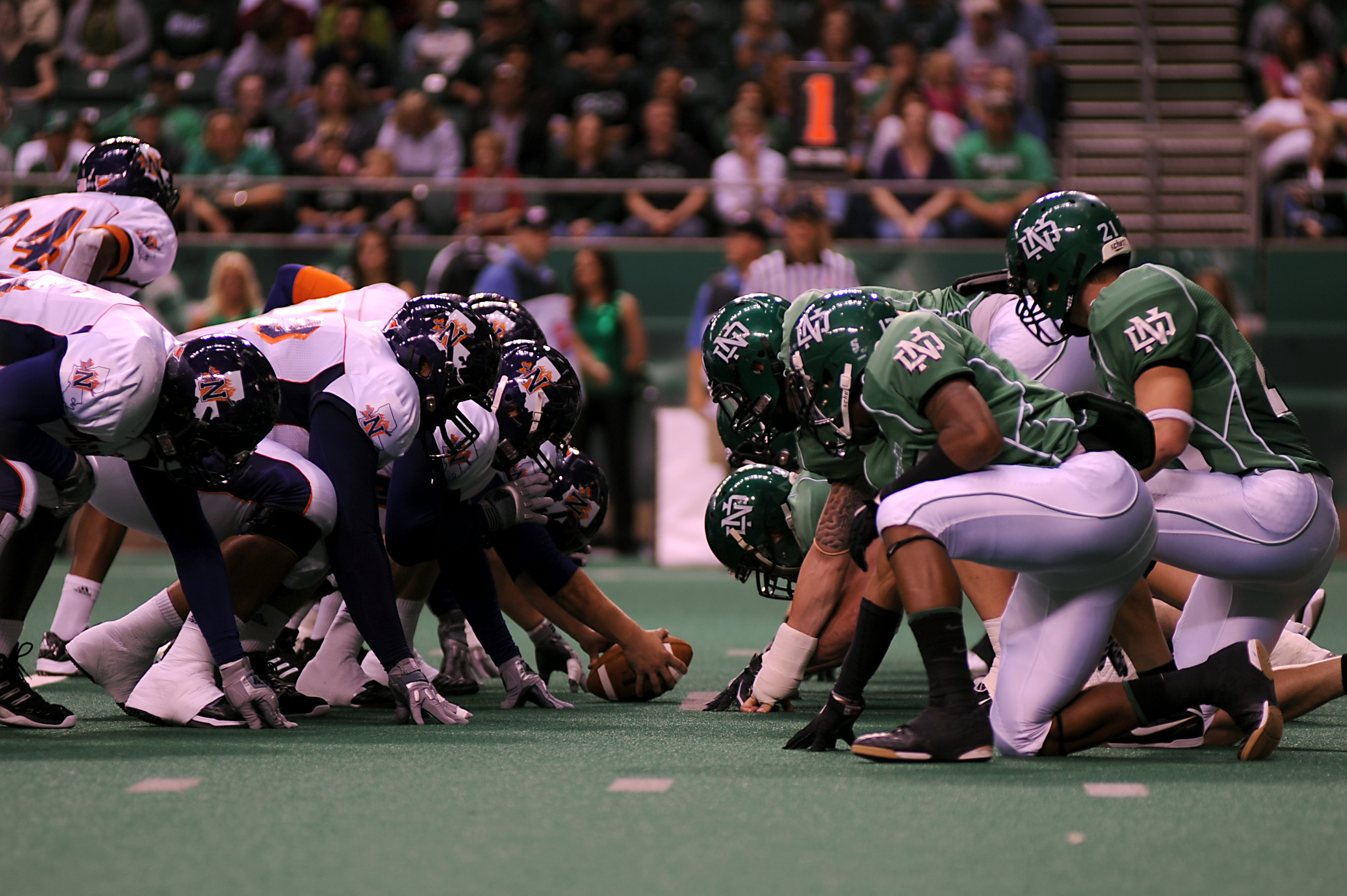
The North Dakota football team lines up on defense before the snap during a game against Northwestern State in 2010

North Dakota elevated all of its athletic programs to the Division I level in 2008. They would join the Great West Conference, which also included South Dakota, Southern Utah, UC Davis, and Cal Poly. Chris Mussman was named the 25th head coach at UND in January 2008. Mussman had been an assistant under Dale Lennon for 9 years, the previous 7 as offensive coordinator, and had been a part of the 2001 National Championship staff. Due to the rules of the division reclassification, North Dakota would not be eligible for post season play until the 2012 season. The Fighting Hawks did not find immediate success at their new level of play. Their first three years produced mixed results at best. The program did achieve winning seasons in both 2008 and 2009, but much of the schedule consisted of Division II, Division III, and NAIA teams that UND was expected to defeat easily; however, they often struggled. In 2009, defending NAIA National Champion University of Sioux Falls came to Grand Forks and stunned the Alerus Center crowd by soundly defeating North Dakota. In 2010, Mussman's squad limped through the season to finish with a record of 3–8, the first losing season for the UND program in 21 years. The 2011 season saw a reversal of fortune for Mussman's Fighting Hawks. UND went 8–3 for the season en route to capturing its first Division I Conference championship and finished with a No. 23 ranking in the national poll. 2011 would be the program's final year of play in the Great West Conference, as the Big Sky Conference would absorb all of the Great West football teams, with the exclusion of South Dakota who moved to the Missouri Valley Football Conference at the start of the 2012 season.

=== Big Sky Conference era ===
The university's athletic teams moved to the Big Sky Conference for the 2012 season. North Dakota went 8–14 in its first two Big Sky seasons, and were generally not competitive against league powers Eastern Washington, Montana, and Montana State. Chris Mussman's contract was terminated after the 2013 season. During his tenure as head coach he compiled a record 31–34, the first time in over 60 years that a coach left UND without a winning record.

Bubba Schweigert was named as head coach on Christmas Eve in 2013. Schweigert was an assistant at UND for 15 seasons first under Roger Thomas, then for Dale Lennon. He was the defensive coordinator for the 2001 National Championship team and the 2003 Runner-up team. Prior to taking the head job at North Dakota, he was the defensive coordinator for Dale Lennon's Southern Illinois team. Schweigert's UND squad finished his first season in 2014 with a 5–7 record. In the 2015 campaign saw improvement under Schweigert beginning with the program's first ever win over an FBS program when they stunned Wyoming in Laramie, Wyoming to open the season. The team improved to 7–4 overall and 5–3 against Big Sky Conference opponents, narrowly missing out on a bid to the NCAA FCS playoffs. The following season, in 2016, Schweigert's program continued to improve. The Fighting Hawks won their first Big Sky Championship, finishing undefeated (8–0) in Big Sky play en route to securing the program's first berth into the Division I FCS Playoffs. They bowed out of the playoff field via a narrow 27–24 loss to Richmond, ending the season with an overall record of 9–3. The final polls placed North Dakota at No. 12 in the nation, its highest ranking of the Division I era. The Fighting Hawks entered the 2017 season ranked No. 10 and were pre-season favorites to repeat as Big Sky Champions. However, an injury-plagued season that saw as many as 14 starters out of the lineup at one point forced the team to limp to a disappointing 3–8 finish.

The 2017 season marked North Dakota's final season of competition in the Big Sky Conference. On January 26, 2017, it was announced that UND would move its football program to the Missouri Valley Football Conference, starting with the 2020 season. The Fighting Hawks will officially be an FCS Independent team during the 2018 and 2019 seasons. During those years, they will still participate in a scheduling alliance with the Big Sky Conference and will play 8 Big Sky teams each season. However, they will not be eligible to win the Big Sky Conference's automatic berth in the FCS Playoffs.

=== Missouri Valley era ===
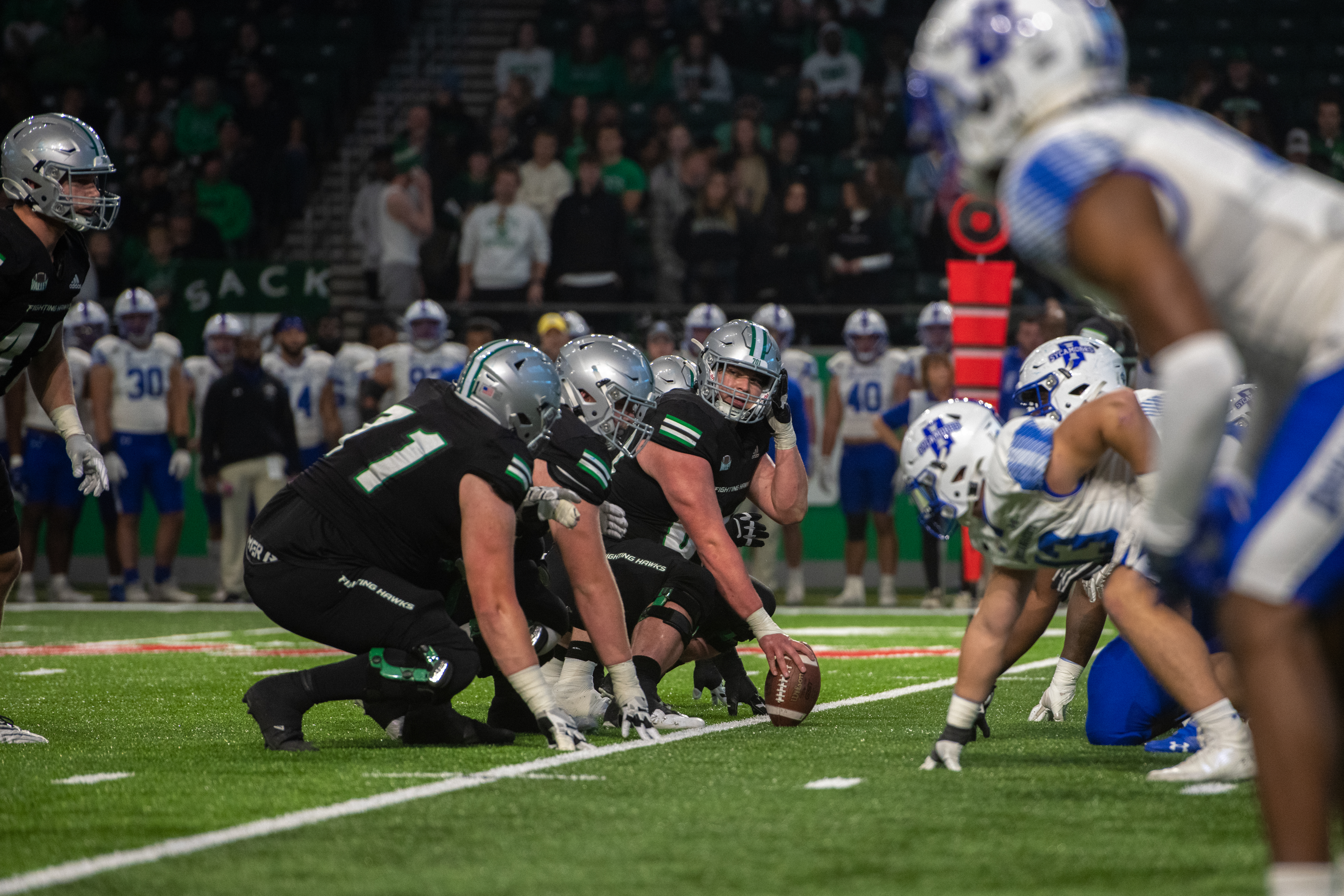
The North Dakota football team lines up on offense before the snap during a game against Indiana State in 2023

In the first season in the Missouri Valley Football Conference the Fighting Hawks went 4–1. The team shared a 3-way tie in winning the conference.

== Conference affiliations ==
- 1894–1921: Independent
- 1922–2007: North Central Conference (1955–72 NCAA College (small) Division; 1973–2007 NCAA Division II)
- 2008–2011: Great West Conference (Division I NCAA Football Championship Subdivision)
- 2012–2017: Big Sky Conference (Division I NCAA Football Championship Subdivision)
- 2018-2019: Independent (Division I NCAA Football Championship Subdivision)
- 2020–present: Missouri Valley Football Conference (Division I NCAA Football Championship Subdivision)

== Championships ==
=== National championships ===
During their time in Division II, North Dakota won one national championship, doing so in 2001. They also finished as runner-up in 2003.

Year	Coach	Selector	Record	Score	Opponent
2001	Dale Lennon	NCAA DII Playoffs	14–1	17–14	Grand Valley State

=== Conference championships ===
North Dakota has won 27 conference championships, with twelve of them being shared with other teams.

Year	Conference	Coach	Record	Conference record
1928	North Central Conference	Charles A. West	6–1–1	4–0
1929	North Central Conference	Charles A. West	9–1	4–0
1930	North Central Conference	Charles A. West	9–1	4–0
1931	North Central Conference	Charles A. West	8–1–2	4–0
1934	North Central Conference	Charles A. West	7–1	3–1
1936	North Central Conference	Charles A. West	9–2	4–0
1937	North Central Conference	Charles A. West	4–4	3–0
1939†	North Central Conference	Charles A. West	5–3	4–1
1958	North Central Conference	Marvin C. Helling	5–3	5–1
1964†	North Central Conference	Marvin C. Helling	8–1	5–1
1966†	North Central Conference	Marvin C. Helling	8–2	5–1
1971	North Central Conference	Jerry Olson	6–3–1	5–1
1972†	North Central Conference	Jerry Olson	10–1–0	6–1
1974†	North Central Conference	Jerry Olson	6–4	5–2
1975	North Central Conference	Jerry Olson	9–1	7–0
1979	North Central Conference	Gene Murphy	10–2	5–1
1993†	North Central Conference	Roger Thomas	10–3	7–2
1994†	North Central Conference	Roger Thomas	10–3	7–2
1995	North Central Conference	Roger Thomas	9–2	8–1
1999†	North Central Conference	Dale Lennon	9–2	8–1
2001	North Central Conference	Dale Lennon	14–1	7–1
2003	North Central Conference	Dale Lennon	12–2	7–0
2005†	North Central Conference	Dale Lennon	10–3	4–2
2006†	North Central Conference	Dale Lennon	11–2	7–1
2011	Great West Conference	Chris Mussman	8–3	3–1
2016†	Big Sky Conference	Kyle Schweigert	9–3	8–0
2020†	Missouri Valley Football Conference	Kyle Schweigert	4–1	4–1

† Co-champions

== Bowl games ==
North Dakota participated in four bowl games, all during their tenure in Division II. The Fighting Hawks went 4–0 in these games.

Year	Bowl	Coach	Opponent	Result
1930	Los Angeles Bowl	Charles A. West	L.A. Fireman	W, 14–9
1965	Mineral Water Bowl	Marvin C. Helling	Northern Illinois	W, 37–20
1966	Pecan Bowl	Marvin C. Helling	Parsons College	W, 42–24
1972	Camellia Bowl	Jerry Olson	Cal Poly	W, 38–21

== Head coaches ==
Number	Name	Tenure
1	Adolph F. Bechdolt	1894
2	Charles S. Farnsworth	1895–1896
3	Melvin A. Brannon	1897–1898
4	Harry C. Loomis	1899
5	Victor L. Littig	1900
6	William Nuessle	1901
7	Harry C. Loomis	1902
8	Rex B. Kennedy	1903
9	George Sweetland	1904–1907
10	David L. Dunlap	1908–1911
11	Fred Vehmeier	1912
12	Fred V. Archer	1913
13	Thomas Andrew Gill	1914–1917
14	Paul J. Davis	1919–1925
15	Tod Rockwell	1926–1927
16	Charles A. West	1928–1945
17	Red Jarrett	1946–1948
18	Dick Miller	1949
19	Frank Zazula	1950–1956
20	Marvin C. Helling	1957–1967
21	Jerry Olson	1968–1977
22	Gene Murphy	1978–1979
23	Pat Behrns	1980–1985
24	Roger Thomas	1986–1998
25	Dale Lennon	1999–2007
26	Chris Mussman	2008–2013
27	Kyle Schweigert	2014–2024
28	Eric Schmidt	2025–present

== Playoff appearances ==
=== NCAA Division I-AA/FCS ===
The Fighting Hawks have appeared in the FCS playoffs six times, with a combined record of 2–6.

Year	Round	Opponent	Result
2016	Second round	Richmond	L, 24–27
2019	First round	@ Nicholls	L, 6–24
2020	First round Quarterfinals	Missouri State @ James Madison	W, 44–10; L, 21–34
2022	First round	@ Weber State	L, 31–38
2023	First round	Sacramento State	L, 35–42
2025	First Round; Second Round	@ Tennessee Tech @ Tarleton State	W, 31–6; L, 13–31

=== NCAA Division II ===
The Fighting Hawks, then known as the Fighting Sioux, made fourteen appearances in the NCAA Division II playoffs. They had an overall record of 18–13.

Year	Round	Opponent	Result
1975	Quarterfinals	Livingston	L, 14–34
1979	Quarterfinals	Mississippi College	L, 15–35
1992	First round	Pittsburg State	L, 21–28
1993	First round Quarterfinals; Semifinals	Pittsburg State; Mankato State; Indiana (PA)	W, 17–14; W, 54–21; L, 6–21
1994	First round Quarterfinals; Semifinals	Northeast Missouri State; North Dakota State; North Alabama	W, 18–6; W, 14–7; L, 7–35
1995	First round	North Dakota State	L, 10–41
1998	First round	Northern Colorado	L, 24–52
1999	First round	Northwest Missouri State	L, 13–20 (OT)
2001	First round Quarterfinals; Semifinals; National Championship	Winona State; Pittsburg State; UC Davis; Grand Valley State	W, 42–28; W, 38–0; W, 14–2; W, 17–14
2003	First round Quarterfinals; Semifinals; National Championship	Pittsburg State; Winona State; North Alabama; Grand Valley State	W, 24–14; W, 36–29; W, 29–22; L, 3–10
2004	First round Second round Quarterfinals; Semifinals	St. Cloud State; Michigan Tech; Grand Valley State; Pittsburg State	W, 20–17 (2OT); W, 20–3; W, 19–15; L, 19–31
2005	First round Second round	Minnesota–Duluth; Grand Valley State	W, 23–13; L, 3–17
2006	First round Second round Quarterfinals	Winona State; Nebraska–Omaha; Grand Valley State	W, 42–0; W, 38–35; L, 20–30
2007	First round Second round	Winona State; Grand Valley State	W, 44–2; L, 14–21

== Rivalries ==
=== North Dakota State ===
North Dakota's primary rival is the North Dakota State University Bison. The two schools are separated by just 70 miles of interstate along the Eastern border of the state and have spent well over a century competing against one another for players, students, fans, resources and recognition. They first met in 1894 and have played 114 times. UND enjoys a healthy 63-50–3 lead in the all-time series. The winner of the game was awarded the Nickel Trophy, a 75-pound likeness of a 1937 U.S. nickel. The annual meeting was paused in 2003, when NDSU left the North Central Conference and elevated their programs to the Division I level. NDSU desired at the time to continue the series; however, North Dakota declined because of potential negative Division II playoff implications, and also because NDSU would be playing with 27 more scholarships. North Dakota eventually moved to Division I also, and since then the two schools have been negotiating terms to resume the series. The two schools announced that they would renew the rivalry in the 2015 season. Initially it was not an annual series, however, as the schools played in different conferences at the time. However, with North Dakota's move to the Missouri Valley Football Conference in 2019, the rivalry resumed as an annual conference matchup, with the first in-conference game between the two schools in over 15 years resulting in a 34–9 win for North Dakota State. The Nickel Trophy was developed and owned by the Blue Key National Honor Fraternities at NDSU and UND. The UND chapter folded in the 1990s so a use agreement was reached with UND Athletics. Because UND changed their nickname from the Fighting Sioux to the Fighting Hawks, the Nickel Trophy has been retired and was not up for grabs in the 2015 game or any matchup since then; the trophy currently sits in the ND Heritage Center in Bismarck, on loan from Blue Key. The rivalry has been featured in documentaries by ESPN and Prairie Public TV.

=== South Dakota ===
North Dakota has enjoyed a spirited rivalry with the University of South Dakota. They are the two oldest universities in the Dakotas. Their first meeting was in 1903 and they have squared off 93 times. UND leads the series 61–30–5. A travelling trophy known as the Sitting Bull Trophy was awarded to the winner of the game from 1953 to 1999 when it was retired due to concerns over political correctness. It is currently in the possession of North Dakota. The rivalry intensified during the 2000s. By 2003, North Dakota St., South Dakota St., Northern Colorado had left the North Central Conference, leaving void for rivals on the schedules of North Dakota and South Dakota. To add fuel to the fire, South Dakota which had been largely irrelevant in football since the 1980s, was rising to prominence and challenging North Dakota for NCC titles by this time. The two moved together to Division I in 2008. In a memorable game to close the 2011 season, UND came back from trailing by 20 points in the 4th quarter to win what was a de facto Great West Championship game. In 2012 the two Universities parted ways when North Dakota joined the Big Sky Conference, while South Dakota moved to the Missouri Valley Football Conference. This move interrupted a stretch of 65 consecutive seasons in which the two programs had met on the gridiron. They resumed play in 2016 as non-conference opponents with a memorable game where North Dakota defeated South Dakota in double overtime 47–44 scoring 20 unanswered points in regulation to force the overtime. The Coyotes exacted revenge the following season with a decisive 45–7 victory over the Fighting Hawks. The rivalry was once again renewed on an annual basis in 2020 when North Dakota joined the Missouri Valley Football Conference, with the first in-conference matchup between the two schools in over 10 years ending in 21–10 victory for the Hawks.

=== Other rivalries ===
Prior to joining the MVFC, North Dakota was a member of the Big Sky Conference. At that time, the Big Sky had 13 teams, so the conference employed an unbalanced schedule that results in only playing certain opponents in different seasons, and continues to do so to this day. To lower travel costs and promote rivalries, each team is assigned two protected rivals that they are guaranteed to play each year. During North Dakota's tenure in the Big Sky, their permanent rivals were Montana State University and the University of Northern Colorado. UND is 16–19–1 all time against Montana State. Northern Colorado, also a long time Division II foe in the NCC, trails the all-time series against North Dakota 18–12.

== Stadiums ==
- Memorial Stadium 1927–2000
- Alerus Center 2001–present

== Notable Alumni ==
- Donovan Alexander (former Canadian Football League player who is a 1 x West CFL All Star)
- Burtland Cummings (not to be confused with Burton Cummings, Burtland is former Canadian Football League player who is a 1 x Grey Cup Champion)
- Weston Dressler (former Canadian Football League player who played slotback, and has won the following awards in the CFL as of November 16, 2026: 1 x Grey Cup Champion, 1x CFL's Most Outstanding Rookie of 2008, 2 x CFL All Star)Kenny Golladay (former National Football League wide receiver who was the NFL's 2019 Receiving Touchdown Leader)
- Willis Jacox (former CFL, NFL player)
- Milson Jones (former Canadian Football League player who won 2 x Grey Cups)
- Chris Kuper (former NFL player, current offensive line coach for the Philadelphia Eagles)
- Jim Kleinsasser (former NFL player, who had a 12 year career with the Minnesota Vikings)
- Jim LeClair (former NFL player, 1 x Pro Bowl)
- Errol Mann (former NFL player, Super Bowl XI Champion)
- Dale Markham (former NFL and CFL player)
- Stan Mikawos (former CFL player who is a 3 x Grey Cup Champion)
- Chad Mustard (former NFL player)
- Brady Oliveira (current Canadian Football League player and future Hall of Fame Candidate for the Winnipeg Blue Bombers who plays running back. Oliveira has won the following awards in the CFL as of November 16, 2026: 2 x Grey Cup Champion 1x CFL's Most Outstanding Player of 2024, 2x CFL's Most Outstanding Canadian Player of 2023 and 2024, 2 x CFL All Star of 2024 and 2024, 3 x CFL Regular Season Rushing Yards Leader of 2023, 2024 and 2026, and currently lead role in TV show Must Love Dogs which is a show about Olivera's role in rescuing dogs in Canada)
- Dave Osborn (UND Retired Jersey Number, former NFL player who is a 1969 NFL Champion)
- Scott Schultz (former Canadian Football League player who is a 1 x All Star, 1 x Grey Cup Champion)
- Todd Thomas (former NFL and USFL player)
- Tim Prinsen (former CFL player who is a 2 x Grey Cup Champion)
- Mark Chipman (former UND Football Player, current chairman and governor of True North Sports & Entertainment, who own and operate the Winnipeg Jets of the National Hockey League)

== List of retired and honored numbers ==
=== List of retired jerseys ===
North Dakota has retired one jersey number in football history.

North Dakota Fighting Hawks retired numbers
No.	Player	Pos.	Tenure	No. ret.	Ref.
41	Dave Osborn	RB	1962–1964	–	

=== List of honored jerseys ===
North Dakota has also honored several players.

North Dakota Fighting Hawks honored numbers
No.	Player	Pos.	Tenure
2	Glenn ‘Red’ Jarrett	RB	1928–1930
14	Corey Colehour	QB	1964–1966
14	Errol Mann	K	1965–1966
54	Jim LeClair	LB	1970–1971
77	Steve Myhra	LB / T / K	1955–1956
77	Dave Fennell	DT	1971–1973

== Future non-conference opponents ==
Announced schedules as of July 20, 2026.

2026	2027	2028	2029	2030	2031
LIU	at LIU	at Minnesota	at Iowa State	at Minnesota	at Idaho State
St. Thomas	Valparaiso	Morehead State	Idaho State		
at Portland State	Idaho	at Idaho			
at Nebraska	at Iowa				
