= 1962 small college football rankings =

- Selectors: AP, UPI
- No. 1: Florida A&M (AP)
- No. 1: Southern Miss (UPI)
- Small college football rankings (AP, UPI)
- «1961 1963»

The 1962 small college football rankings are rankings of college football teams representing smaller college and university teams during the 1962 college football season, including the 1962 NCAA College Division football season and the 1962 NAIA football season. Separate rankings were published by the Associated Press (AP) and the United Press International (UPI). The AP rankings were selected by a board of eight sports writers, and the UPI rankings were selected by a board of small-college coaches from throughout the country.

In the final AP poll, Florida A&M was rated No. 1. The Rattlers subsequently lost to Jackson State in the Orange Blossom Classic. Other teams ranked by the AP included Wittenberg (9–0) at No. 2 and the Central State Bronchos (11–0) at No. 3.

In the final UPI poll, Southern Miss (9–1) was selected as the small-college national champion. Southern Miss lost one game – to Memphis State by an 8–6 score.

== Legend ==
	Increase in ranking
	Decrease in ranking
	Not ranked previous week
(#–#)	Win–loss record
(Italics)	Number of first place votes
т	Tied with team above or below also with this symbol

== AP poll ==
	Week 1 Oct 3	Week 2 Oct 10	Week 3 Oct 17	Week 4 Oct 24	Week 5 Oct 31	Week 6 Nov 7	Week 7 Nov 14	Week 8 Nov 21	Week 9 Nov 28	
1.	Fresno State (3)	Florida A&M (2–0)	Florida A&M (3–0) (4)	Florida A&M (4–0) (4)	Florida A&M (5–0)	Florida A&M (6–0)	Florida A&M (7–0) (3)	Florida A&M (8–0) т	Florida A&M (9–0)	1.
2.	Pittsburg State (2)	Southern Miss (4–0)	Fresno State (3–1)	Northern Illinois (6–0)	Southeastern Louisiana (5–0)	Wittenberg (7–0)	Wittenberg (8–0) (1)	Wittenberg (9–0) т	Wittenberg (9–0)	2.
3.	Florida A&M (1)	Pittsburg State (3–1)	Northern Illinois (5–0) т	Fresno State (4–1)	Southern Miss (6–1)	Southern Miss (7–1)	Southern Miss (8–1) (1)	Southern Miss (9–1)	Central Oklahoma (9–0)	3.
4.	Southern Miss (1)	Southeastern Louisiana (4–0)	Southeastern Louisiana (4–0) т	Southern Miss (5–1)	Wittenberg (6–0)	Northern Illinois (7–1)	Central Oklahoma (8–0) (1)	Central Oklahoma (9–0)	Southern Miss (9–1)	4.
5.	Texas Southern	Slippery Rock	Southern Miss (4–1)	Southeastern Louisiana (5–0)	Central Oklahoma (7–0)	Central Oklahoma (8–0)	Northern Illinois (8–1)	Texas A&I (9–0–1)	Lenoir–Rhyne (10–0)	5.
6.	William Jewell	Fresno State (2–1)	Pittsburg State (KS) (4–1)	Central Oklahoma (6–0)	Lenoir–Rhyne (7–0)	Southeastern Louisiana (5–1)	Fresno State (6–2)	Northern Illinois (8–1)	Texas A&I (9–0–1)	6.
7.	Linfield	Lamar Tech (4–0)	Lamar Tech (5–0)	Wittenberg (5–0)	Northern Illinois (6–1)	Texas A&I (7–0–1)	Texas A&I (8–0–1) (1)	Lenoir–Rhyne (9–0)	Northern Illinois (9–1)	7.
8.	Slippery Rock (1)	Hillsdale (4–0)	Southern Illinois (2–2)	Pittsburg State (4–2)	Texas A&I (6–0–1)	Lenoir–Rhyne (8–0)	Lenoir–Rhyne (9–0)	Saint John's (MN)	Fresno State (7–3)	8.
9.	Hillsdale	Texas Southern т	Central Oklahoma (5–0)	Southern Illinois (3–2)	Southern Illinois (4–2)	Fresno State (5–2)	Southeastern Louisiana (6–1)	Fresno State (7–2)	Saint John's (MN) (9–0)	9.
10.	Southeastern Louisiana	Linfield т	Humboldt State (3–0)	Lamar Tech (5–1)	Fresno State (4–2)	Pittsburg State (6–2)	Southwest Texas State (8–1)	Southeastern Louisiana (6–2)	Southeastern Louisiana (6–3)	10.
	Week 1 Oct 3	Week 2 Oct 10	Week 3 Oct 17	Week 4 Oct 24	Week 5 Oct 31	Week 6 Nov 7	Week 7 Nov 14	Week 8 Nov 21	Week 9 Nov 28	
		Dropped: 6 William Jewell	Dropped: 5 Slippery Rock; 8 Hillsdale; 9 Texas Southern; 10 Linfield	Dropped: 10 Humboldt State	Dropped: Pittsburg State; 10 Lamar Tech	Dropped: 9 Southern Illinois	Dropped: 10 Pittsburg State	Dropped: 10 Southwest Texas State	None	

== UPI coaches poll ==
	Week 1 Oct 4	Week 2 Oct 11	Week 3 Oct 18	Week 4 Oct 25	Week 5 Nov 1	Week 6 Nov 8	Week 7 Nov 15	Week 8 Nov 22	Week 9 Nov 29	
1.	Florida A&M (1–0) (5)	Florida A&M (1–0) (10)	Florida A&M (3–0) (17)	Florida A&M (4–0)	Florida A&M (5–0) (13)	Florida A&M (6–0) (14)	Southern Miss (8–1) (15)	Southern Miss (9–1) (21)	Southern Miss (9–1) (19)	1.
2.	Southern Miss (3–0) (5)	Southern Miss (4–0) (10)	Southern Miss (4–1) (6)	Southern Miss (5–1)	Southern Miss (6–1) (14)	Southern Miss (7–1) (13)	Florida A&M (7–0) (14)	Florida A&M (8–0) (6)	Florida A&M (9–0) (7)	2.
3.	Fresno State (2–0) (3)	Delaware (3–0) (6)	Fresno State (3–1) (4)	Fresno State (4–1)	Southeastern Louisiana (5–0) (1)	Central Oklahoma (8–0) (4)	Central Oklahoma (8–0) (3)	Central Oklahoma (9–0) (3)	Central Oklahoma (9–0) (3)	3.
4.	Delaware (2–0) (4) т	Fresno State (2–1) (3)	Northern Illinois (5–0) (2)	Northern Illinois (6–0)	Central Oklahoma (7–0) (3)	Lenoir–Rhyne (8–0)	Lenoir–Rhyne (9–0)	Lenoir–Rhyne (9–0)	Lenoir–Rhyne (10–0)	4.
5.	Pittsburg State (3–0) (3) т	Hillsdale (4–0)	Southeastern Louisiana (4–0)	Southeastern Louisiana (5–0)	Fresno State (4–2) (2)	Northern Illinois (7–1)	Northern Illinois (8–1)	Fresno State (7–2)	Wittenberg (9–0) (2)	5.
6.	Southern Illinois (1–2) (1)	Southeastern Louisiana (3–0)	Central Oklahoma (5–0) (1)	Central Oklahoma (6–0)	Lenoir–Rhyne (7–0)	Fresno State (5–2)	Fresno State (6–2)	Northern Illinois (8–1)	Northern Illinois (8–1)	6.
7.	Southeastern Louisiana (3–0) (1)	Northern Illinois (4–0) (2)	Delaware (3–1) (1)	Lenoir–Rhyne (6–0)	Northern Illinois (6–1)	Southeastern Louisiana (5–1)	Southeastern Louisiana (6–1)	Wittenberg (9–0) (1)	Fresno State (7–3)	7.
8.	Lenoir–Rhyne (3–0) (1)	Humboldt State (3–0) (1)	Southern Illinois (2–2)	Arkansas State (5–0)	Arkansas State (5–1) (1)	Montana State (6–2)	Delaware (6–2)	Delaware (7–2) (1)	Texas A&I (9–0–1)	8.
9.	Hillsdale (3–0)	Central Oklahoma (4–0) (1)	Lenoir–Rhyne (5–0)	Southern Illinois (3–3)	Delaware (4–2)	Delaware (5–2)	Wittenberg (8–0)	Texas A&I (9–0–1)	Delaware (7–2)	9.
10.	Central Oklahoma (3–0) (2)	Lenoir–Rhyne (4–0)	Pittsburg State (4–1)	Montana State (5–1)	Montana State (5–2)	Arkansas State (5–2)	Texas A&I (8–0–1)	Southeastern Louisiana (6–2)	Montana State (7–3)	10.
11.	Louisiana Tech (3–0) (2)	Pittsburg State (3–1)	Humboldt State (1)	Delaware	Arizona State College	Texas A&I (7–0–1)	Montana State	Arkansas State	Southeastern Louisiana (6–3)	11.
12.	Omaha	Southern Illinois	Hillsdale	Arizona State College	Texas A&I (6–0–1)	Cal Poly Pomona	Arkansas State	Montana State	Arkansas State	12.
13.	Texas A&I	Memphis State	Montana State	Pittsburg State (4–2)	Southern Illinois (4–2)	Wittenberg (7–0)	Cal Poly Pomona (2)	Cal Poly Pomona (2)	Cal Poly Pomona	13.
14.	Northern Illinois	Wheaton (IL)	Arkansas State	Hillsdale т	Pittsburg State	Arizona State College	Linfield	Saint John's (MN)	College of Emporia т	14.
15.	Humboldt State	Montana State	Northeast Missouri	South Dakota State т	Wittenberg (6–0)	Linfield	San Diego State (8–1)	Linfield	Linfield т	15.
16.	Middle Tennessee т	Arkansas State	Lamar Tech (5–0)	Lamar Tech (5–1) т	Akron	Pittsburg State (6–2)	Saint John's (MN)	Parsons (1)	Adams State	16.
17.	Wheaton (IL) (1) т	Akron т	Arizona State College	Texas A&I	South Dakota State	Akron	Arizona State College	Omaha	South Dakota State	17.
18.	Memphis State т	Arizona State College т	Tufts	Humboldt State т	Lamar Tech	Parsons т	Omaha	College of Emporia	Omaha т	18.
19.	Northern Michigan т	Lamar Tech (4–0)	Texas A&I	Wittenberg (5–0) т	Cal Poly Pomona	Southwest Texas т	Parsons (1)	San Diego State (8–2) т	Parsons т	19.
20.	Arkansas State т	Texas Southern (1)	Cal Poly Pomona	Northeast Missouri	Southwest Texas	San Diego State (7–1)	College of Emporia т	South Dakota State т	Saint John's (MN) (9–0)	20.
21.	Montana State т						Southwest Texas т			21.
	Week 1 Oct 4	Week 2 Oct 11	Week 3 Oct 18	Week 4 Oct 25	Week 5 Nov 1	Week 6 Nov 8	Week 7 Nov 15	Week 8 Nov 22	Week 9 Nov 29	
		Dropped: 11 Louisiana Tech; 12 Omaha; 13 Texas A&I; 16 Middle Tennessee; 19 Northern Michigan	Dropped: 13 Memphis State; 14 Wheaton (IL); 17 Akron; 20 Texas Southern	Dropped: 18 Tufts; 20 Cal Poly Pomona	Dropped: 14 Hillsdale; 18 Humboldt State; 20 Northeast Missouri	Dropped: 13 Southern Illinois; 17 South Dakota State; 18 Lamar Tech	Dropped: 16 Pittsburg State; 17 Akron	Dropped: 17 Arizona State College; 20 Southwest Texas	Dropped: 19 San Diego State	

== Pittsburgh Courier rankings ==
The Pittsburgh Courier, a leading African American newspaper, ranked the top 1962 teams from historically black colleges and universities in an era when college football was often racially segregated.

The rankings were published on December 8:

- 1. Florida A&M (9–1)
- 2. Jackson State (10–1)
- 3. Morgan State (8–2)
- 4. North Carolina A&T (7–3)
- 5. Texas Southern (7–3)
- 6. Grambling (6–2–2)
- 7. Virginia Union (7–2)
- 8. Maryland State (4–2–1)
- 9. Clark (6–1)
- 10. North Carolina College (6–3)
- 11. Prairie View A&M (6–3)
- 12. Johnson C. Smith (7–2)
- 13. Bethune-Cookman (7–2)
- 14. Alabama A&M (8–2)
- 15. Morehouse (6–2)
- 16. Lincoln (MO) (5–3–1)
- 17. Southern (5–5)
- 18. South Carolina State (5–3)
- 19. Fisk (6–2)
- 20. Alcorn A&M (4–5)
