= Vannette W. Johnson =

American football and track coach (1930–2022)

Biographical details
- Born: May 27, 1930; Little Rock, Arkansas, U.S.
- Died: May 12, 2022 (aged 91); Pine Bluff, Arkansas, U.S.

Playing career

Football
- c. 1950: Arkansas AM&N
- Position: Quarterback

Coaching career (HC unless noted)

Football
- 1952–1956: Merrill HS (AR) (assistant)
- 1957–1961: Arkansas AM&N (backfield)
- 1962–1972: Arkansas AM&N / Arkansas–Pine Bluff

Track
- 1957–1962: Arkansas AM&N

Administrative career (AD unless noted)
- 1962–?: Arkansas AM&N

Head coaching record
- Overall: 53–46–6 (football)

Vannette William Johnson (May 27, 1930 – May 12, 2022) was an American football and track coach and college athletics administrator. He served as the head football coach at the University of Arkansas at Pine Bluff—known as Arkansas Agricultural, Mechanical & Normal College prior to 1972—for 11 seasons, from 1962 to 1972, and compiled a record of 53–46–6.

Johnson played football at Dunbar High School in Little Rock, Arkansas and graduated in 1948. He then played college football as a quarterback at Arkansas AM&N before he graduated in 1952 with a bachelor's degree in history and government. He also earned a master's degree in physical education from the University of Arkansas in 1961. Johnson began his coaching career as an assistant at Merrill High School in Pine Bluff, Arkansas in 1952. He returned to Arkansas AM&N in 1957 as backfield coach for the football team and head track coach. In 1962 he was appointed as the school's head football coach and athletic director.

Johnson died in Pine Bluff, Arkansas on May 12, 2022, at the age of 91.

== Head coaching record ==
=== Football ===
Year	Team	Overall	Conference	Standing	Bowl/playoffs
Arkansas AM&N Golden Lions (Southwest Athletic Conference) (1962–1969)
1962	Arkansas AM&N	4–5–1	2–4–1	6th	
1963	Arkansas AM&N	5–4–1	3–3–1	T–4th	
1964	Arkansas AM&N	5–5	3–4	T–4th	
1965	Arkansas AM&N	4–5–1	3–3–1	T–4th	
1966	Arkansas AM&N	4–5–1	2–4–1	7th	
1967	Arkansas AM&N	6–4	3–4	T–5th	
1968	Arkansas AM&N	5–5	4–3	4th	
1969	Arkansas AM&N	3–6–1	2–4–1	6th	
Arkansas AM&N / Arkansas–Pine Bluff Golden Lions (NCAA College Division independent) (1970–1972)
1970	Arkansas AM&N	6–3			
1971	Arkansas AM&N	7–2			
1972	Arkansas–Pine Bluff	4–2–1			
Arkansas AM&N / Arkansas–Pine Bluff:		53–46–6	22–29–5		
Total:		53–46–6			
