= David Busey =

American football coach and athletic director

Biographical details
- Born: 27 September 1912; Urbana, Champaign County, Illinois, US
- Died: 31 January 1981 (aged 68)
- Education: University of Illinois

Coaching career (HC unless noted)
- 1954–1966: Lycoming

Administrative career (AD unless noted)
- 1954–1979: Lycoming

Head coaching record
- Overall: 41–56–3

Accomplishments and honors

Awards
- Lycoming Hall of Fame (1986)

David G. Busey (1912-1981) was an American football coach and athletic director. He was the head coach at Lycoming College in Williamsport, Pennsylvania from 1954 to 1966, compiling a record of 41–56–3.

Upon his arrival at Lycoming, Busey was tasked with restarting a football program that had stopped playing in 1950. His first squad featured only two players with any football playing experience.

== Head coaching record ==
Year	Team	Overall	Conference	Standing	Bowl/playoffs
Lycoming Warriors (Independent) (1954–1957)
1954	Lycoming	0–6			
1955	Lycoming	2–4–1			
1956	Lycoming	5–3			
1957	Lycoming	5–1–1			
Lycoming Warriors (Middle Atlantic Conference) (1958–1966)
1958	Lycoming	7–1	4–1	2nd (Southern College)	
1959	Lycoming	3–5	1–4	8th (Southern College)	
1960	Lycoming	3–5	1–3	NA (Southern College)	
1961	Lycoming	1–6–1	1–3–1	5th (Southern College)	
1962	Lycoming	4–4	1–4	7th (Southern College)	
1963	Lycoming	1–7	1–5	6th (Southern College)	
1964	Lycoming	1–7	1–5	T–6th (Southern College)	
1965	Lycoming	5–3	4–2	3rd (Southern College)	
1966	Lycoming	4–4	4–3	4th (Southern College)	
Lycoming:		41–56–3	18–30–1		
Total:		41–56–3			
