= 1962 Humboldt State Lumberjacks football team =

American college football season

1962 Humboldt State Lumberjacks football
- Conference: Far Western Conference
- Record: 7–2 (3–2 FWC)
- Head coach: Phil Sarboe (12th season)
- Home stadium: Redwood Bowl

1962 Far Western Conference football standings
	Conf.					Overall
Team	W		L		T	W		L		T
San Francisco State $	3	–	1	–	1	6	–	2	–	1
Humboldt State	3	–	2	–	0	7	–	2	–	0
Nevada	2	–	2	–	1	5	–	3	–	1
UC Davis	2	–	3	–	0	5	–	4	–	0
Chico State	2	–	3	–	0	4	–	4	–	1
Sacramento State	2	–	3	–	0	2	–	7	–	0
$ – Conference champion

The 1962 Humboldt State Lumberjacks football team represented Humboldt State College—now known as California State Polytechnic University, Humboldt—as a member of the Far Western Conference (FWC) during the 1962 NCAA College Division football season. Led by 12th-year head coach Phil Sarboe, the Lumberjacks compiled an overall record of 7–3 with a mark of 3–2 in conference play, placing second in the FWC. The team outscored opponents 217 to 56 for the season. Humboldt State played home games at the Redwood Bowl in Arcata, California.

== Schedule ==
Date	Opponent	Rank	Site	Result	Attendance	Source
September 22	at Oregon Tech*		Klamath Falls, OR	W 57–0	2,000	
September 29	Willamette*		Redwood Bowl; Arcata, CA	W 21–13	5,000	
October 6	San Francisco State	No. 15 UPI	Redwood Bowl; Arcata, CA	W 27–7	7,000–7,500	
October 20	at UC Davis	No. 10 AP / 11 UPI	Toomey Field; Davis, CA	L 0–7	3,500–4,000	
October 27	at Nevada	No. 18 UPI	Mackay Stadium (Note: This stadium is the predecessor to the current Mackay Stadium, which was opened for the 1966 season.); Reno, NV	L 0–15	4,400	
November 3	Chico State		Redwood Bowl; Arcata, CA	W 19–0	6,500	
November 10	Whitman*		Redwood Bowl; Arcata, CA	W 40–0	4,000	
November 16	Western Washington*		Redwood Bowl; Arcata, CA	W 32–0	3,000	
November 22	Sacramento State		Redwood Bowl; Arcata, CA	W 20–14	5,000–6,010	
*Non-conference game; Rankings from AP/UPI Poll released prior to the game

== Team players in the NFL ==
The following Humboldt State players were selected in the 1963 NFL draft.

Player	Position	Round	Overall	NFL Team
Drew Roberts	Split End	18	246	Washington Redskins

The following finished their college career in 1962, were not drafted, but played in the NFL.

Player	Position	First NFL Team
Wendell Hayes	Running Back	1963 Dallas Cowboys
