= 1962 San Francisco State Gators football team =

American college football season

1962 San Francisco State Gators football

FWC champion
- Conference: Far Western Conference
- Record: 6–2–1 (3–1–1 FWC)
- Head coach: Vic Rowen (2nd season)
- Home stadium: Cox Stadium

1962 Far Western Conference football standings
	Conf.					Overall
Team	W		L		T	W		L		T
San Francisco State $	3	–	1	–	1	6	–	2	–	1
Humboldt State	3	–	2	–	0	7	–	2	–	0
Nevada	2	–	2	–	1	5	–	3	–	1
UC Davis	2	–	3	–	0	5	–	4	–	0
Chico State	2	–	3	–	0	4	–	4	–	1
Sacramento State	2	–	3	–	0	2	–	7	–	0
$ – Conference champion

The 1962 San Francisco State Gators football team represented San Francisco State College—now known as San Francisco State University—as a member of the Far Western Conference (FWC) during the 1962 NCAA College Division football season. Led by second-year head coach Vic Rowen, San Francisco State compiled an overall record of 6–2–1 with a mark of 3–1–1 in conference play, winning the FWC title. For the season the team outscored its opponents 135 to 102. The Gators played home games at Cox Stadium in San Francisco.

== Schedule ==
Date	Opponent	Site	Result	Attendance	Source
September 14	at UC Santa Barbara*	La Playa Stadium; Santa Barbara, CA	W 16–14	8,000	
September 22	at Long Beach State*	Veterans Stadium; Long Beach, CA	W 20–7	3,831	
September 29	Cal Poly Pomona*	Cox Stadium; San Francisco, CA	L 9–12	3,500–3,800	
October 6	at Humboldt State	Redwood Bowl; Arcata, CA	L 7–27	7,000–7,500	
October 13	Santa Clara*	Cox Stadium; San Francisco, CA	W 19–8	3,700	
October 20	at Nevada	Mackay Stadium (Note: This stadium is the predecessor to the current Mackay Stadium, which was opened for the 1966 season.); Reno, NV	T 14–14	3,200–3,500	
October 26	at UC Davis	Toomey Field; Davis, CA	W 12–7	2,500	
November 10	Sacramento State	Cox Stadium; San Francisco, CA	W 28–7	2,576–3,500	
November 17	Chico State	Cox Stadium; San Francisco, CA	W 10–6	5,800	
*Non-conference game

== Team players in the NFL / AFL ==
No San Francisco State players were selected in the 1963 NFL draft.

The following finished their college career in 1962, were not drafted, but played in the AFL.

Player	Position	First AFL team
Bill Baird	Defensive Back - Halfback	1963 New York Jets
