= 1962 Lafayette Leopards football team =

American college football season

1962 Lafayette Leopards football
- Conference: Middle Atlantic Conference
- University Division
- Record: 3–6 (2–4 MAC)
- Head coach: James McConlogue (5th season)
- Captain: Martin Shane
- Home stadium: Fisher Field

1962 Middle Atlantic Conference football standings
	Conf.					Overall
Team	W		L		T	W		L		T
University Division
Delaware x	5	–	0	–	0	7	–	2	–	0
Bucknell	5	–	1	–	0	6	–	3	–	0
Lehigh	2	–	2	–	0	3	–	6	–	0
Temple	2	–	3	–	0	3	–	6	–	0
Lafayette	2	–	4	–	0	3	–	5	–	0
Gettysburg	2	–	4	–	0	2	–	6	–	0
Muhlenberg	0	–	4	–	0	2	–	7	–	0
Northern College Division
Susquehanna x	5	–	0	–	0	9	–	0	–	0
Moravian	4	–	2	–	0	5	–	3	–	0
Wagner	3	–	3	–	0	4	–	4	–	1
Wilkes	3	–	4	–	0	3	–	4	–	0
Upsala	2	–	3	–	0	4	–	4	–	0
Albright	2	–	3	–	0	3	–	5	–	0
Lycoming	1	–	4	–	0	4	–	4	–	0
Hofstra *	1	–	0	–	0	8	–	2	–	0
Juniata *	2	–	1	–	0	6	–	2	–	0
Southern College Division
Western Maryland x	5	–	1	–	0	8	–	1	–	0
Drexel x	5	–	1	–	0	6	–	2	–	0
Swarthmore	4	–	2	–	0	5	–	2	–	0
Lebanon Valley	4	–	2	–	0	5	–	3	–	0
Pennsylvania Military	5	–	4	–	0	5	–	5	–	0
Dickinson	3	–	5	–	0	3	–	5	–	0
Johns Hopkins	2	–	4	–	0	2	–	6	–	0
Ursinus	2	–	5	–	0	2	–	5	–	0
Haverford	1	–	5	–	0	1	–	6	–	0
Franklin & Marshall	0	–	5	–	0	0	–	8	–	0
West Chester *	0	–	0	–	0	7	–	2	–	0
x – Division champion/co-champions; * – Ineligible for championship due to insufficient conference games

The 1962 Lafayette Leopards football team was an American football team that represented Lafayette College during the 1962 NCAA College Division football season. Lafayette tied for second-to-last in the Middle Atlantic Conference, University Division, and finished last in the Middle Three Conference.

In their fifth and final year under head coach James McConlogue, the Leopards compiled a 3–6 record. Martin Shane was the team captain.

With a 2–4 record against MAC University Division opponents, Lafayette tied with Gettysburg for fifth place in the seven-team circuit. The Leopards went 0–2 against the Middle Three, losing to both Lehigh and Rutgers.

Lafayette played its home games at Fisher Field on College Hill in Easton, Pennsylvania.

== Schedule ==
Date	Opponent	Site	Result	Attendance	Source
September 22	Muhlenberg	Fisher Field; Easton, PA	W 17–0	6,000	
September 29	at Penn*	Franklin Field; Philadelphia, PA	L 11–13	8,716	
October 6	at No. 4 Delaware	Delaware Stadium; Newark, DE	L 7–28	7,646	
October 13	Temple	Fisher Field; Easton, PA	L 0–21	6,500	
October 20	at Bucknell	Memorial Stadium; Lewisburg, PA	L 6–28	8,500	
October 27	Gettysburg	Fisher Field; Easton, PA	W 20–14	7,500	
November 3	at Rutgers	Rutgers Stadium; Piscataway, NJ	L 0–40	6,000	
November 10	at Waynesburg*	Uniontown High School Field; Uniontown, PA	W 10–0	1,700	
November 17	Lehigh	Fisher Field; Easton, PA (The Rivalry)	L 6–13	15,500–18,000	
*Non-conference game; Rankings from UPI Poll released prior to the game
