= 1962 Temple Owls football team =

American college football season

1962 Temple Owls football
- Conference: Middle Atlantic Conference
- University Division
- Record: 3–6 (2–3 MAC)
- Head coach: George Makris (3rd season)
- Captain: Game captains
- Home stadium: Temple Stadium

1962 Middle Atlantic Conference football standings
	Conf.					Overall
Team	W		L		T	W		L		T
University Division
Delaware x	5	–	0	–	0	7	–	2	–	0
Bucknell	5	–	1	–	0	6	–	3	–	0
Lehigh	2	–	2	–	0	3	–	6	–	0
Temple	2	–	3	–	0	3	–	6	–	0
Lafayette	2	–	4	–	0	3	–	5	–	0
Gettysburg	2	–	4	–	0	2	–	6	–	0
Muhlenberg	0	–	4	–	0	2	–	7	–	0
Northern College Division
Susquehanna x	5	–	0	–	0	9	–	0	–	0
Moravian	4	–	2	–	0	5	–	3	–	0
Wagner	3	–	3	–	0	4	–	4	–	1
Wilkes	3	–	4	–	0	3	–	4	–	0
Upsala	2	–	3	–	0	4	–	4	–	0
Albright	2	–	3	–	0	3	–	5	–	0
Lycoming	1	–	4	–	0	4	–	4	–	0
Hofstra *	1	–	0	–	0	8	–	2	–	0
Juniata *	2	–	1	–	0	6	–	2	–	0
Southern College Division
Western Maryland x	5	–	1	–	0	8	–	1	–	0
Drexel x	5	–	1	–	0	6	–	2	–	0
Swarthmore	4	–	2	–	0	5	–	2	–	0
Lebanon Valley	4	–	2	–	0	5	–	3	–	0
Pennsylvania Military	5	–	4	–	0	5	–	5	–	0
Dickinson	3	–	5	–	0	3	–	5	–	0
Johns Hopkins	2	–	4	–	0	2	–	6	–	0
Ursinus	2	–	5	–	0	2	–	5	–	0
Haverford	1	–	5	–	0	1	–	6	–	0
Franklin & Marshall	0	–	5	–	0	0	–	8	–	0
West Chester *	0	–	0	–	0	7	–	2	–	0
x – Division champion/co-champions; * – Ineligible for championship due to insufficient conference games

The 1962 Temple Owls football team was an American football team that represented Temple University as a member of the Middle Atlantic Conference (MAC) during the 1962 NCAA College Division football season. In its third season under head coach George Makris, the team compiled a 3–6 record (2–3 against MAC opponents) and finished fourth out of seven teams in the MAC's University Division. The team played its home games at Temple Stadium in Philadelphia.

== Schedule ==
Date	Opponent	Site	Result	Attendance	Source
September 22	Merchant Marine*	Temple Stadium; Philadelphia, PA	W 14–3	10,000	
September 29	Bucknell	Temple Stadium; Philadelphia, PA	L 14–15	10,000	
October 6	at Muhlenberg	Muhlenberg Field; Allentown, PA	W 38–7	5,000	
October 13	at Lafayette	Fisher Field; Easton, PA	W 21–0	6,500	
October 20	Buffalo*	Temple Stadium; Philadelphia, PA	L 13–16	10,500	
October 27	at Hofstra*	Hofstra College Stadium; Hempstead, NY	L 10–19	3,473–4,000	
November 3	No. 9 Delaware	Temple Stadium; Philadelphia, PA	L 8–20	4,500	
November 10	at Toledo*	Glass Bowl; Toledo, OH	L 0–13	4,279	
November 17	Gettysburg	Temple Stadium; Philadelphia, PA	L 15–22	5,000–5,500	
*Non-conference game; Rankings from UPI Poll released prior to the game
