= Doug Porter =

American football coach (1929–2024)

Biographical details
- Born: August 15, 1929; Memphis, Tennessee, U.S.
- Died: June 5, 2024 (aged 94); Grambling, Louisiana, U.S.

Playing career
- c. 1950: Xavier (LA)
- Position: Quarterback

Coaching career (HC unless noted)
- 1954: Father Bertrand HS (TN) (assistant)
- 1955–1960: Xavier (LA) (backfield)
- 1961–1965: Mississippi Vocational / Valley State
- 1966–1973: Grambling State (assistant)
- 1974–1978: Howard
- 1979–1985: Fort Valley State
- 1987–1996: Fort Valley State

Administrative career (AD unless noted)
- 1961–?: Mississippi Vocational / Valley State
- 1981–1997: Fort Valley State

Head coaching record
- Overall: 155–110–5
- Bowls: 0–1
- Tournaments: 0–1 (NCAA D-II playoffs)

Accomplishments and honors

Championships
- 4 SIAC (1982–1983, 1991–1992)

Awards
- MEAC Coach of the Year (1974)
- College Football Hall of Fame; Inducted in 2008 (profile)

Douglas T. Porter (August 15, 1929 – June 5, 2024) was an American football coach and college athletics administrator.

== Biography ==
A native of Memphis, Tennessee, Porter played high school football at Father Bertrand High School. He played college football as a quarterback at Xavier University of Louisiana in New Orleans for three seasons and later earned a Master of Science degree from Indiana University Bloomington.

Porter served in the United States Army from 1951 to 1954, reaching the rank of first lieutenant. In 1954, he was an assistant coach at Father Betrand High School, working on the staff of his father, W. P. Porter. He then returned to Xavier as backfield coach and director of intramural sports. In August 1961, Porter was appointed as athletic director and head football coach at Mississippi Vocation College—now known as Mississippi Valley State University—in Itta Bena, Mississippi.

He served as the head coach at Mississippi Valley State University (1961–1965), Howard University (1974–1978), and Fort Valley State University (1979–1985, 1987–1996), compiling a career college football record of 155–110–5. He was also an assistant coach at Grambling State University under Eddie Robinson between his stints at Mississippi Valley State and Howard. Porter was inducted into the College Football Hall of Fame in 2008.

Porter died in Grambling, Louisiana, on June 5, 2024, at the age of 94. His funeral was at St. Benedict the Moor Catholic Church.

== Head coaching record ==
| Year | Team | Overall | Conference | Standing | Bowl/playoffs | NCAA^{#} |
|---|---|---|---|---|---|---|
Mississippi Vocational Delta Devils (South Central Athletic Conference) (1961)
| 1961 | Mississippi Vocational | 2–4 | | | | |
Mississippi Vocational / Valley State Delta Devils (NCAA College Division independent) (1962–1965)
| 1962 | Mississippi Vocational | 2–5 | | | | |
| 1963 | Mississippi Vocational | 6–3 | | | | |
| 1964 | Mississippi Vocational | 5–4 | | | | |
| 1965 | Mississippi Vocational | 6–3 | | | | |
| Mississippi Vocational / Valley State: | | 21–19 | | | | |
Howard Bison (Mid-Eastern Athletic Conference) (1974–1978)
| 1974 | Howard | 8–2–1 | 4–1–1 | T–2nd | L Orange Blossom Classic | |
| 1975 | Howard | 8–3 | 4–2 | 3rd | | |
| 1976 | Howard | 5–5–1 | 3–2–1 | T–3rd | | |
| 1977 | Howard | 5–5 | 2–4 | 5th | | |
| 1978 | Howard | 4–6 | 2–4 | T–5th | | |
| Howard: | | 30–21–2 | 15–13–2 | | | |
Fort Valley State Wildcats (Southern Intercollegiate Athletic Conference) (1979–1985)
| 1979 | Fort Valley State | 4–4–1 | 2–2–1 | | | |
| 1980 | Fort Valley State | 6–4–1 | 4–0–1 | | | |
| 1981 | Fort Valley State | 9–2 | 4–1 | | | |
| 1982 | Fort Valley State | 10–2 | 6–0 | 1st | L NCAA Division II First Round | 7 |
| 1983 | Fort Valley State | 8–1 | 5–0 | 1st | | 9 |
| 1984 | Fort Valley State | 8–3 | 5–2 | | | |
| 1985 | Fort Valley State | 8–1 (Note: Porter coached the first nine games of the season before suffering a heart attack. Gerald T. Walker replaced Porter as interim head coach for the remainder of the season. Fort Valley State finished the year with an overall record of 9–3, sharing the Southern Intercollegiate Athletic Conference title and losing in the first round of the NCAA Division II playoffs.) | 4–0 | | | |
Fort Valley State Wildcats (Southern Intercollegiate Athletic Conference) (1987–1996)
| 1987 | Fort Valley State | 4–6 | 3–4 | | | |
| 1988 | Fort Valley State | 3–7 | 2–5 | | | |
| 1989 | Fort Valley State | 6–4 | 5–1 | 2nd | | |
| 1990 | Fort Valley State | 4–7 | 2–5 | T–6th | | |
| 1991 | Fort Valley State | 7–3 | 5–2 | T–1st | | |
| 1992 | Fort Valley State | 7–4 | 6–1 | 1st | | 10 |
| 1993 | Fort Valley State | 6–4–1 | 5–1–1 | 2nd | | |
| 1994 | Fort Valley State | 5–5 | 5–3 | T–3rd | | |
| 1995 | Fort Valley State | 3–8 | 3–5 | 7th | | |
| 1996 | Fort Valley State | 6–5 | 3–3 | T–2nd | | |
| Fort Valley State: | | 104–70–3 | 69–36–3 | | | |
| Total: | | 155–110–5 | | | | |
