= 1962 Bucknell Bison football team =

American college football season

1962 Bucknell Bison football
- Conference: Middle Atlantic Conference
- University Division
- Record: 6–3 (5–1 MAC)
- Head coach: Bob Odell (4th season)
- Captain: Richard Tyrrell
- Home stadium: Memorial Stadium

1962 Middle Atlantic Conference football standings
	Conf.					Overall
Team	W		L		T	W		L		T
University Division
Delaware x	5	–	0	–	0	7	–	2	–	0
Bucknell	5	–	1	–	0	6	–	3	–	0
Lehigh	2	–	2	–	0	3	–	6	–	0
Temple	2	–	3	–	0	3	–	6	–	0
Lafayette	2	–	4	–	0	3	–	5	–	0
Gettysburg	2	–	4	–	0	2	–	6	–	0
Muhlenberg	0	–	4	–	0	2	–	7	–	0
Northern College Division
Susquehanna x	5	–	0	–	0	9	–	0	–	0
Moravian	4	–	2	–	0	5	–	3	–	0
Wagner	3	–	3	–	0	4	–	4	–	1
Wilkes	3	–	4	–	0	3	–	4	–	0
Upsala	2	–	3	–	0	4	–	4	–	0
Albright	2	–	3	–	0	3	–	5	–	0
Lycoming	1	–	4	–	0	4	–	4	–	0
Hofstra *	1	–	0	–	0	8	–	2	–	0
Juniata *	2	–	1	–	0	6	–	2	–	0
Southern College Division
Western Maryland x	5	–	1	–	0	8	–	1	–	0
Drexel x	5	–	1	–	0	6	–	2	–	0
Swarthmore	4	–	2	–	0	5	–	2	–	0
Lebanon Valley	4	–	2	–	0	5	–	3	–	0
Pennsylvania Military	5	–	4	–	0	5	–	5	–	0
Dickinson	3	–	5	–	0	3	–	5	–	0
Johns Hopkins	2	–	4	–	0	2	–	6	–	0
Ursinus	2	–	5	–	0	2	–	5	–	0
Haverford	1	–	5	–	0	1	–	6	–	0
Franklin & Marshall	0	–	5	–	0	0	–	8	–	0
West Chester *	0	–	0	–	0	7	–	2	–	0
x – Division champion/co-champions; * – Ineligible for championship due to insufficient conference games

The 1962 Bucknell Bison football team was an American football team that represented Bucknell University during the 1962 NCAA College Division football season. Bucknell finished second in the University Division of the Middle Atlantic Conference.

In its fourth season under head coach Bob Odell, the team compiled a 6–3 record, 5–1 against division opponents. Richard Tyrrell was the team captain.

The team played its home games at Memorial Stadium on the university campus in Lewisburg, Pennsylvania.

== Schedule ==
Date	Opponent	Site	Result	Attendance	Source
September 22	Gettysburg	Memorial Stadium; Lewisburg, PA	W 22–21	6,000	
September 29	at Temple	Temple Stadium; Philadelphia, PA	W 15–14	10,000	
October 6	UMass*	Memorial Stadium; Lewisburg, PA	L 20–21	6,000	
October 13	at Lehigh	Taylor Stadium; Bethlehem, PA	W 32–6	6,000–8,500	
October 20	Lafayette^{†}	Memorial Stadium; Lewisburg, PA	W 28–6	8,500	
October 27	at Muhlenberg	Muhlenberg Field; Allentown, PA	W 53–0	4,000–5,000	
November 3	Buffalo*	Memorial Stadium; Lewisburg, PA	L 0–28	4,000	
November 10	Colgate*	Memorial Stadium; Lewisburg, PA	W 32–14	4,500	
November 17	at No. 8 Delaware	Delaware Stadium; Newark, DE	L 6–9	9,000	
*Non-conference game; ^{†}Homecoming; Rankings from UPI Poll released prior to the game
