= 1962 Mississippi Vocational Delta Devils football team =

American college football season

1962 Mississippi Vocational Delta Devils football
- Conference: South Central Athletic Conference
- Record: 2–5 (2–0 SCAC)
- Head coach: Doug Porter (2nd season)
- Home stadium: Magnolia Stadium

The 1962 Mississippi Vocational Delta Devils football team represented Mississippi Vocational College (now known as Mississippi Valley State University) as a member of the South Central Athletic Conference (SCAC) during the 1962 NCAA College Division football season. Led by second-year head coach Doug Porter, the Delta Devils compiled an overall record of 2–5.

== Schedule ==
Date	Opponent	Site	Result	Source
September 22	at Bishop*	Dal-Hi Stadium; Dallas, TX	L 12–13	
September 29	at Jackson State*	Alumni Field; Jackson, MS	L 0–50	
October 6	vs. Mississippi Industrial	Clarksdale, MS	L 6–12	
October 13	Grambling*	Magnolia Stadium; Itta Bena, MS	L 6–41	
October 20	at Jarvis	Hawkins, TX	W 43–15	
October 27	Rust^{†}	Magnolia Stadium; Itta Bena, MS	W 13–0	
November 10	Alcorn A&M*	Magnolia Stadium; Itta Bena, MS	L 13–23	
*Non-conference game; ^{†}Homecoming
