= 1962 Hofstra Flying Dutchmen football team =

American college football season

1962 Hofstra Flying Dutchmen football

Cement Bowl, L 12–46 vs. West Chester
- Conference: Middle Atlantic Conference
- Northern College Division
- Record: 8–2 (1–0 MAC)
- Head coach: Howdy Myers (13th season)
- Captains: Dick Caproni; Ron Zoia
- Home stadium: Hofstra College Stadium

1962 Middle Atlantic Conference football standings
	Conf.					Overall
Team	W		L		T	W		L		T
University Division
Delaware x	5	–	0	–	0	7	–	2	–	0
Bucknell	5	–	1	–	0	6	–	3	–	0
Lehigh	2	–	2	–	0	3	–	6	–	0
Temple	2	–	3	–	0	3	–	6	–	0
Lafayette	2	–	4	–	0	3	–	5	–	0
Gettysburg	2	–	4	–	0	2	–	6	–	0
Muhlenberg	0	–	4	–	0	2	–	7	–	0
Northern College Division
Susquehanna x	5	–	0	–	0	9	–	0	–	0
Moravian	4	–	2	–	0	5	–	3	–	0
Wagner	3	–	3	–	0	4	–	4	–	1
Wilkes	3	–	4	–	0	3	–	4	–	0
Upsala	2	–	3	–	0	4	–	4	–	0
Albright	2	–	3	–	0	3	–	5	–	0
Lycoming	1	–	4	–	0	4	–	4	–	0
Hofstra *	1	–	0	–	0	8	–	2	–	0
Juniata *	2	–	1	–	0	6	–	2	–	0
Southern College Division
Western Maryland x	5	–	1	–	0	8	–	1	–	0
Drexel x	5	–	1	–	0	6	–	2	–	0
Swarthmore	4	–	2	–	0	5	–	2	–	0
Lebanon Valley	4	–	2	–	0	5	–	3	–	0
Pennsylvania Military	5	–	4	–	0	5	–	5	–	0
Dickinson	3	–	5	–	0	3	–	5	–	0
Johns Hopkins	2	–	4	–	0	2	–	6	–	0
Ursinus	2	–	5	–	0	2	–	5	–	0
Haverford	1	–	5	–	0	1	–	6	–	0
Franklin & Marshall	0	–	5	–	0	0	–	8	–	0
West Chester *	0	–	0	–	0	7	–	2	–	0
x – Division champion/co-champions; * – Ineligible for championship due to insufficient conference games

The 1962 Hofstra Flying Dutchmen football team represented Hofstra College during the 1962 NCAA College Division football season. Hofstra finished with an overall record of 8–2 in its 22nd season of varsity play. After a successful regular season in which Hofstra went 8–1 (1–0 in conference play) and outscored its opponents 175 to 83, the Flying Dutchmen were invited to their first (and program's only) bowl game – the Cement Bowl, played in Allentown, Pennsylvania. They lost the bowl game to West Chester, 46–12. Their head coach was Howdy Myers and their captains were Dick Caproni and Ron Zoia.

== Schedule ==
Date	Opponent	Site	Result	Attendance	Source
September 22	Springfield*	Hofstra College Stadium; Hempstead, NY	W 13–10	2,500	
September 29	Southern Connecticut State*	Hofstra College Stadium; Hempstead, NY	W 35–21	2,337	
October 13	at Bridgeport*	Bridgeport, CT	W 21–6	5,000	
October 20	Merchant Marine*	Hofstra College Stadium; Hempstead, NY	W 21–0	3,747	
October 27	Temple*	Hofstra College Stadium; Hempstead, NY	W 19–10	3,473–4,000	
November 3	at Lycoming	Williamsport, PA	W 20–6		
November 10	at Rhode Island*	Meade Stadium; Kingston, RI	W 20–8	1,000–3,500	
November 17	No. 2 Wittenburg*	Hofstra College Stadium; Hempstead, NY	L 12–16	4,510	
November 22	at C.W. Post*	Post Bowl; Brookville, NY	W 14–6	3,000	
December 8	vs. West Chester*	Allentown School District Stadium; Allentown, PA (Cement Bowl)	L 12–46	6,000	
*Non-conference game; Rankings from AP Poll released prior to the game
