= 1962 Nevada Wolf Pack football team =

American college football season

1962 Nevada Wolf Pack football
- Conference: Far Western Conference
- Record: 5–3–1 (2–2–1 FWC)
- Head coach: Dick Trachok (4th season)
- Home stadium: Mackay Stadium

1962 Far Western Conference football standings
| | Conf. | | | | | Overall |
| Team | W | | L | | T | W | | L | | T |
|---|---|---|---|---|---|---|---|---|---|---|
| San Francisco State $ | 3 | – | 1 | – | 1 | 6 | – | 2 | – | 1 |
| Humboldt State | 3 | – | 2 | – | 0 | 7 | – | 2 | – | 0 |
| Nevada | 2 | – | 2 | – | 1 | 5 | – | 3 | – | 1 |
| UC Davis | 2 | – | 3 | – | 0 | 5 | – | 4 | – | 0 |
| Chico State | 2 | – | 3 | – | 0 | 4 | – | 4 | – | 1 |
| Sacramento State | 2 | – | 3 | – | 0 | 2 | – | 7 | – | 0 |
$ – Conference champion

The 1962 Nevada Wolf Pack football team represented the University of Nevada during the 1962 NCAA College Division football season. Nevada competed as a member of the Far Western Conference (FWC). The Wolf Pack were led by fourth-year head coach Dick Trachok and played their home games at Mackay Stadium.

== Schedule ==
| Date | Opponent | Site | Result | Attendance | Source |
|---|---|---|---|---|---|
| September 22 | Redlands* | Mackay Stadium; Reno, NV | W 33–0 | 2,500 | |
| September 29 | Whittier* | Mackay Stadium; Reno, NV | W 21–6 | 2,900 | |
| October 6 | at Chico State | College Field; Chico, CA | L 7–21 | 3,000 | |
| October 13 | at UC Davis | Toomey Field; Davis, CA | L 6–8 | 300–5,200 | |
| October 20 | San Francisco State | Mackay Stadium; Reno, NV | T 14–14 | 3,200–3,500 | |
| October 27 | Humboldt State^{†} | Mackay Stadium; Reno, NV | W 15–0 | 4,400 | |
| November 3 | Sacramento State | Mackay Stadium; Reno, NV | W 23–12 | 2,900–3,551 | |
| November 10 | at Cal Poly Pomona* | Kellogg Field; Pomona, CA | L 6–19 | 2,800–3,000 | |
| November 17 | Idaho State* | Mackay Stadium; Reno, NV | W 14–7 | 3,000 | |
*Non-conference game; ^{†}Homecoming
