= 1962 Tennessee A&I Tigers football team =

American college football season

1962 Tennessee A&I Tigers football
- Conference: Midwest Athletic Association
- Record: 1–7–1 (1–1–1 MWAA)
- Head coach: Lawrence Simmons (2nd season)
- Home stadium: Hale Stadium

1962 Midwest Athletic Association football standings
	Conf.					Overall
Team	W		L		T	W		L		T
No. 16 Lincoln (MO) $	2	–	0	–	1	5	–	3	–	1
Central State (OH)	2	–	1	–	0	3	–	3	–	1
Tennessee A&I	1	–	1	–	1	1	–	7	–	1
Kentucky State	0	–	3	–	0	4	–	4	–	0
$ – Conference champion; Rankings from Pittsburgh Courier

The 1962 Tennessee A&I Tigers football team represented Tennessee Agricultural & Industrial State College (now known as Tennessee State University) as a member of the Midwest Athletic Association (MWAA) during the 1962 NCAA College Division football season. Led by second-year head coach Lawrence Simmons, the Tigers compiled an overall record of 1–7–1, with a 1–1–1 conference record, and finished third in the MWAA.

== Schedule ==
Date	Opponent	Site	Result	Attendance	Source
September 22	at North Carolina A&T*	World War Memorial Stadium; Greensboro, NC	L 13–16	7,500	
September 29	Morris Brown*	Hale Stadium; Nashville, TN	L 8–13	6,500	
October 6	at Grambling*	Grambling Stadium; Grambling, LA	L 6–26	6,000	
October 20	at Central State (OH)	McPherson Stadium; Wilberforce, OH	L 6–21	5,500	
October 27	at No. 1 Florida A&M*	Bragg Memorial Stadium; Tallahassee, FL	L 0–20	10,000	
November 3	Southern*	Hale Stadium; Nashville, TN	L 0–13	4,500	
November 10	Lincoln (MO)	Hale Stadium; Nashville, TN	T 16–16	5,000	
November 22	Kentucky State	Hale Stadium; Nashville, TN	W 33–10	6,500	
December 1	at Jackson State*	Alumni Stadium; Jackson, MS	L 6–36	8,000	
*Non-conference game; Rankings from AP Poll released prior to the game
