= Lawrence Simmons =

American football and baseball coach (1911–1994)

Biographical details
- Born: July 5, 1911; Oklahoma, U.S.
- Died: October 9, 1994 (aged 83); Fairview Heights, Illinois, U.S.

Playing career

Football
- 1936–1937: Tennessee State
- Position: Fullback

Coaching career (HC unless noted)

Football
- 1938: Tennessee State (backfield)
- 1939: Tennessee State
- 1948: Tennessee A&I (backfield)
- 1951–1952: South Carolina State
- 1953–1954: Tennessee A&I (assistant)
- 1955–1960: East St. Louis Lincoln HS (IL)
- 1961–1962: Tennessee A&I

Baseball
- 1947–1950: Tennessee A&I
- 1953–1955: Tennessee A&I

Head coaching record
- Overall: 21–18–3 (college football); 43–14 (high school football)

Accomplishments and honors

Championships
- Football; 1 MWAA (1961)

Lawrence E. Simmons (July 5, 1911 – October 9, 1994) was an American football and baseball coach. He served as the head football coach at Tennessee A&I State College—now known as Tennessee State University—in Nashville, Tennessee in 1939 and again from 1961 to 1962, and at the Colored Normal Industrial Agricultural and Mechanical College of South Carolina—now known as South Carolina State University—in Orangeburg, South Carolina from 1951 to 1952, compiling a career college football coach record of 20–18–3. Simmons also had two stints as the head baseball coach at Tennessee A&I, from 1947 to 1950 and 1953 to 1955.

Simmons was the head football coach at East St. Louis Lincoln High School in East St. Louis, Illinois from 1955 to 1960, tallying a mark of 43–14.

Simmons and his wife Mildred celebrated their 25th wedding anniversary in 1968. He and his wife are interred alongside each other at Jefferson Barracks National Cemetery in Missouri.

== Head coaching record ==
=== College football ===
Year	Team	Overall	Conference	Standing	Bowl/playoffs
Tennessee State Tigers (Midwest Athletic Association) (1939)
1939	Tennessee State	4–3–1	1–2	5th	
South Carolina State Bulldogs (Southern Intercollegiate Athletic Conference) (1951–1952)
1951	South Carolina State	5–2	4–2	T–5th	
1952	South Carolina State	7–2	5–1	T–2nd	
South Carolina State:		12–4	9–3		
Tennessee A&I Tigers (Midwest Athletic Association / Midwest Conference) (1961–1962)
1961	Tennessee A&I	4–4–1	3–0	1st	
1962	Tennessee A&I	1–7–1	1–1–1	3rd	
Tennessee State/A&I:		9–14–3	5–3–1		
Total:		21–18–3			
National championship Conference title Conference division title or championship game berth
