= 1962 Wittenberg Tigers football team =

American college football season

1962 Wittenberg Tigers football

OAC champion
- Conference: Ohio Athletic Conference
- Record: 9–0 (6–0 OAC)
- Head coach: Bill Edwards (8th season)

1962 Ohio Athletic Conference football standings
	Conf.					Overall
Team	W		L		T	W		L		T
No. 2 Wittenberg $	6	–	0	–	0	9	–	0	–	0
Akron	7	–	1	–	0	7	–	2	–	0
Denison	5	–	1	–	0	7	–	1	–	1
Muskingum	6	–	2	–	0	7	–	2	–	0
Baldwin–Wallace	3	–	1	–	0	6	–	2	–	0
Hiram	4	–	2	–	0	5	–	3	–	0
Otterbein	4	–	3	–	0	5	–	3	–	0
Capital	4	–	4	–	0	4	–	4	–	0
Wooster	3	–	4	–	0	4	–	4	–	1
Mount Union	2	–	5	–	0	3	–	6	–	0
Heidelberg	2	–	5	–	0	2	–	7	–	0
Oberlin	1	–	5	–	0	1	–	6	–	0
Marietta	1	–	5	–	0	1	–	8	–	0
Ohio Wesleyan	1	–	6	–	0	3	–	6	–	0
Kenyon	1	–	6	–	0	2	–	6	–	0
$ – Conference champion; Rankings from AP small college poll

The 1962 Wittenberg Tigers football team was an American football team that represented Wittenberg University in the Ohio Athletic Conference (OAC) during the 1962 NCAA College Division football season. In their eighth year under head coach Bill Edwards, the Tigers compiled a perfect 9–0 record and won the OAC championship.

In the final Associated Press (AP) small college poll, Florida A&M edged Wittenberg by a narrow margin of 67 points to 66. In the final UPI coaches poll, Wittenberg was ranked fifth.

Six Wittenberg players were selected by the Associated Press as first-team players on the 1962 All-OAC football team: sophomore quarterback Charles Green; senior end Bill McCrory; junior defensive end Jim Worden; junior defensive tackle Al Capauano; senior linebacker Jack Spohn; and senior defensive halfback Hoy Allen.

== Schedule ==
Date	Opponent	Rank	Site	Result	Attendance	Source
September 22	DePauw*		Springfield, OH	W 18–0		
September 29	at Otterbein		Westerville, OH	W 14–7		
October 6	Heidelberg		Springfield, OH	W 21–0		
October 13	at Marietta		Marietta, OH	W 55–0		
October 20	Capital		Springfield, OH	W 35–0	5,500	
October 27	Ohio Wesleyan	No. 7	Springfield, OH	W 37–6		
November 3	at Gettysburg*	No. 4	Gettysburg, PA	W 27–6	1,000	
November 10	at Akron	No. 2	Rubber Bowl; Akron, OH	W 17–6	6,070	
November 17	at Hofstra*	No. 2	Hofstra College Stadium; Hempstead, NY	W 16–12	4,510	
*Non-conference game; Rankings from AP Poll released prior to the game
