= 1962 East Tennessee State Buccaneers football team =

American college football season

1962 East Tennessee State Buccaneers football

OVC co-champion
- Conference: Ohio Valley Conference
- Record: 7–3 (4–2 OVC)
- Head coach: Star Wood (10th season)
- Home stadium: College Stadium

1962 Ohio Valley Conference football standings
	Conf.					Overall
Team	W		L		T	W		L		T
East Tennessee State +	4	–	2	–	0	7	–	3	–	0
Eastern Kentucky +	4	–	2	–	0	6	–	3	–	0
Morehead State +	4	–	2	–	0	5	–	3	–	0
Middle Tennessee +	4	–	2	–	0	6	–	4	–	0
Western Kentucky	3	–	3	–	0	5	–	3	–	0
Murray State	1	–	5	–	0	5	–	5	–	0
Tennessee Tech	1	–	5	–	0	2	–	8	–	0
+ – Conference co-champions

The 1962 East Tennessee State Buccaneers football team represented East Tennessee State College (now known as East Tennessee State University) as a member of the Ohio Valley Conference (OVC) during the 1962 NCAA College Division football season. Led by 10th-year head coach Star Wood, the Buccaneers compiled an overall record of 7–3, with a mark of 4–2 in conference play, and finished as OVC co-champion.

== Schedule ==
Date	Opponent	Site	Result	Attendance	Source
September 15	at Murray State	Cutchin Stadium; Murray, KY	W 6–3	500	
September 22	Western Kentucky	College Stadium; Johnson City, TN	W 27–7	5,000	
September 29	at Chattanooga*	Chamberlain Field; Chattanooga, TN	L 13–14	6,500	
October 6	at Tennessee Tech	Overall Field; Cookeville, TN	W 26–6	6,000	
October 13	at Eastern Kentucky	Hanger Field; Richmond, KY	L 14–20	7,000	
October 20	Wofford*	College Stadium; Johnson City, TN	W 29–14	6,000	
October 27	Morehead State	College Stadium; Johnson City, TN	L 10–14	3,500	
November 3	at Austin Peay	Municipal Stadium; Clarksville, TN	W 23–0	2,500	
November 10	Middle Tennessee	College Stadium; Johnson City, TN	W 20–12	3,000	
November 17	at Newberry*	Setzler Field; Newberry, SC	W 14–12	2,500	
*Non-conference game; Source:
