= 1962 Drexel Dragons football team =

American college football season

1962 Drexel Dragons football

MAC Southern College Division co-champion
- Conference: Middle Atlantic Conference
- Southern College Division
- Record: 6–2 (5–1 MAC)
- Head coach: Tom Grebis (2nd season)
- Home stadium: Drexel Field

1962 Middle Atlantic Conference football standings
	Conf.					Overall
Team	W		L		T	W		L		T
University Division
Delaware x	5	–	0	–	0	7	–	2	–	0
Bucknell	5	–	1	–	0	6	–	3	–	0
Lehigh	2	–	2	–	0	3	–	6	–	0
Temple	2	–	3	–	0	3	–	6	–	0
Lafayette	2	–	4	–	0	3	–	5	–	0
Gettysburg	2	–	4	–	0	2	–	6	–	0
Muhlenberg	0	–	4	–	0	2	–	7	–	0
Northern College Division
Susquehanna x	5	–	0	–	0	9	–	0	–	0
Moravian	4	–	2	–	0	5	–	3	–	0
Wagner	3	–	3	–	0	4	–	4	–	1
Wilkes	3	–	4	–	0	3	–	4	–	0
Upsala	2	–	3	–	0	4	–	4	–	0
Albright	2	–	3	–	0	3	–	5	–	0
Lycoming	1	–	4	–	0	4	–	4	–	0
Hofstra *	1	–	0	–	0	8	–	2	–	0
Juniata *	2	–	1	–	0	6	–	2	–	0
Southern College Division
Western Maryland x	5	–	1	–	0	8	–	1	–	0
Drexel x	5	–	1	–	0	6	–	2	–	0
Swarthmore	4	–	2	–	0	5	–	2	–	0
Lebanon Valley	4	–	2	–	0	5	–	3	–	0
Pennsylvania Military	5	–	4	–	0	5	–	5	–	0
Dickinson	3	–	5	–	0	3	–	5	–	0
Johns Hopkins	2	–	4	–	0	2	–	6	–	0
Ursinus	2	–	5	–	0	2	–	5	–	0
Haverford	1	–	5	–	0	1	–	6	–	0
Franklin & Marshall	0	–	5	–	0	0	–	8	–	0
West Chester *	0	–	0	–	0	7	–	2	–	0
x – Division champion/co-champions; * – Ineligible for championship due to insufficient conference games

The 1962 Drexel Dragons football team represented the Drexel Institute of Technology (renamed Drexel University in 1970) as a member of the Middle Atlantic Conference during the 1962 NCAA College Division football season. Tom Grebis was the team's head coach.

== Schedule ==
Date	Time	Opponent	Site	Result	Attendance
September 29		at Coast Guard*	Jones Field; New London, CT	L 8–10	4,000
October 6		at Lebanon Valley	Annville, PA	W 34–12	2,500
October 13		at Lycoming	Williamsport, PA	W 17–14	4,000
October 20	1:30 pm	Wilkes	Drexel Field; Philadelphia, PA	W 14–12	2,000
October 27		Pennsylvania Military^{†}	Drexel Field; Philadelphia, PA	W 31–8	6,500
November 3		at Delaware Valley*	Doylestown, PA	W 13–0	500
November 10		Western Maryland	Drexel Field; Philadelphia, PA	L 0–8	2,000
November 17		Dickinson	Drexel Field; Philadelphia, PA	W 10–7	2,500
*Non-conference game; ^{†}Homecoming; All times are in Eastern time

== Roster ==
1962 Drexel Dragons football team roster
Players
Coaches
Offense

Pos.	#	Name	Class
TE	40	Frank Gallo
TE	48	Harry Purnell
TE	46	Doug Cranage
OT	77	Don Mankin
OT	41	Joel Gotchel
OT	88	Norm Shotwell
G	44	Paul Eichhorn	Sr
G	17	John Smith
G	30	Bill Whitorff
G	49	Chuck Niessner
C	99	Jules Bosch
C		Brud Shaw
HB	29	Joe Buffalo	Sr
HB	27	Al Wagner	Sr
HB	24	Bob Laux	Sr
HB	22	Ed Bogdan
HB	25	Dave Leahy
FB	31	Bruno Ceccarelli
FB	33	Larry Browne	Sr
QB	12	Fran Crovetti
QB, P	19	Gene Bishop	Sr
QB		George Carter
QB	10	Tim Patterson
QB	11	Bob King
QB	18	Don Harmatuck
	14	John Schlichtig
	15	Andy Pekala
	16	Rich Thatcher
	23	George Guerra
	26	Dave Ferrier
	28	Bob Brennan
	32	Joe Reeder
	35	Hal Vang
	38	Fred Fenster
	42	Tim DiFiore
	43	George Betz
	45	Ted Passyn
	47	Al Anderman

Defense

Pos.	#	Name	Class

Special teams

Pos.	#	Name	Class

Head coach

- Tom Grebis (Drexel)

Coordinators/assistant coaches

- Don Shank (Penn State)
- Herman Epstein (Maryland)
- Bill Magee (Villanova)

Legend

- (C) Team captain
- (S) Suspended
- (I) Ineligible
- Injured
- Redshirt
