= 1962 Susquehanna Crusaders football team =

American college football season

1962 Susquehanna Crusaders football

MAC Northern College Division champion
- Conference: Middle Atlantic Conference
- Northern College Division
- Record: 9–0 (5–0 MAC)
- Head coach: Jim Garrett (3rd season)

1962 Middle Atlantic Conference football standings
	Conf.					Overall
Team	W		L		T	W		L		T
University Division
Delaware x	5	–	0	–	0	7	–	2	–	0
Bucknell	5	–	1	–	0	6	–	3	–	0
Lehigh	2	–	2	–	0	3	–	6	–	0
Temple	2	–	3	–	0	3	–	6	–	0
Lafayette	2	–	4	–	0	3	–	5	–	0
Gettysburg	2	–	4	–	0	2	–	6	–	0
Muhlenberg	0	–	4	–	0	2	–	7	–	0
Northern College Division
Susquehanna x	5	–	0	–	0	9	–	0	–	0
Moravian	4	–	2	–	0	5	–	3	–	0
Wagner	3	–	3	–	0	4	–	4	–	1
Wilkes	3	–	4	–	0	3	–	4	–	0
Upsala	2	–	3	–	0	4	–	4	–	0
Albright	2	–	3	–	0	3	–	5	–	0
Lycoming	1	–	4	–	0	4	–	4	–	0
Hofstra *	1	–	0	–	0	8	–	2	–	0
Juniata *	2	–	1	–	0	6	–	2	–	0
Southern College Division
Western Maryland x	5	–	1	–	0	8	–	1	–	0
Drexel x	5	–	1	–	0	6	–	2	–	0
Swarthmore	4	–	2	–	0	5	–	2	–	0
Lebanon Valley	4	–	2	–	0	5	–	3	–	0
Pennsylvania Military	5	–	4	–	0	5	–	5	–	0
Dickinson	3	–	5	–	0	3	–	5	–	0
Johns Hopkins	2	–	4	–	0	2	–	6	–	0
Ursinus	2	–	5	–	0	2	–	5	–	0
Haverford	1	–	5	–	0	1	–	6	–	0
Franklin & Marshall	0	–	5	–	0	0	–	8	–	0
West Chester *	0	–	0	–	0	7	–	2	–	0
x – Division champion/co-champions; * – Ineligible for championship due to insufficient conference games

The 1962 Susquehanna Crusaders football team was an American football team that represented Susquehanna University as a member of the Middle Atlantic Conference (PAC) during the 1962 NCAA College Division football season. In their third season under head coach Jim Garrett, the Crusaders compiled a perfect 9–0 record, won the MAC Northern College Division championship, and outscored opponents by a total of 242 to 50. The season was part of a 22-game unbeaten streak that began on October 22, 1960, and ended on September 21, 1963. As of the end of the 1962 season, Susquehanna's 22-game winning streak was the longest active streak in the country.

The team averaged 290.3 rushing yards per game. The team's statistical leaders (conference games only) included halfback Larry Erdman with 392 rushing yards; fullback Larry Kerstetter with 30 points; and halfback Terry Kissinger who averaged 38.6 yards per punt. Kerstetter was selected on the all-state football team along with five Penn State players.

Other key players included quarterback Don Green, center John Rolands, guard Richie Caruso, and center Ron Porcorus.

== Schedule ==
Date	Opponent	Site	Result	Attendance	Source
September 22	vs. Upsala	Sunbury High School Stadium; Sunbury, PA	W 16–0	3,500	
September 29	Ursinus	University Field; Selinsgrove, PA	W 28–0	3,000	
October 6	at Lycoming	Williamsport, PA	W 3–0	3,200	
October 13	Wagner	Selinsgrove, PA	W 14–7		
October 20	at Western Maryland	Westminster, MD	W 22–8		
October 27	at Trinity (CT)*	Trinity Field; Hartford, CT	W 20–16	4,000	
November 3	at Oberlin*	Oberlin, OH	W 42–7		
November 10	at Union (NY)*	Schenectady, NY	W 46–9		
November 17	Delaware Valley*	Selinsgrove, PA	W 51–3		
*Non-conference game
