= 1962 Akron Zips football team =

American college football season

1962 Akron Zips football
- Conference: Ohio Athletic Conference
- Record: 7–2 (7–1 OAC)
- Head coach: Gordon K. Larson (2nd season)
- Captain: Tom Adolph
- Home stadium: Rubber Bowl

1962 Ohio Athletic Conference football standings
	Conf.					Overall
Team	W		L		T	W		L		T
No. 2 Wittenberg $	6	–	0	–	0	9	–	0	–	0
Akron	7	–	1	–	0	7	–	2	–	0
Denison	5	–	1	–	0	7	–	1	–	1
Muskingum	6	–	2	–	0	7	–	2	–	0
Baldwin–Wallace	3	–	1	–	0	6	–	2	–	0
Hiram	4	–	2	–	0	5	–	3	–	0
Otterbein	4	–	3	–	0	5	–	3	–	0
Capital	4	–	4	–	0	4	–	4	–	0
Wooster	3	–	4	–	0	4	–	4	–	1
Mount Union	2	–	5	–	0	3	–	6	–	0
Heidelberg	2	–	5	–	0	2	–	7	–	0
Oberlin	1	–	5	–	0	1	–	6	–	0
Marietta	1	–	5	–	0	1	–	8	–	0
Ohio Wesleyan	1	–	6	–	0	3	–	6	–	0
Kenyon	1	–	6	–	0	2	–	6	–	0
$ – Conference champion; Rankings from AP small college poll

The 1962 Akron Zips football team represented Akron University in the 1962 NCAA College Division football season as a member of the Ohio Athletic Conference. Led by second-year head coach Gordon K. Larson, the Zips played their home games at the Rubber Bowl in Akron, Ohio. They finished the season with a record of 7–2 overall and 7–1 in OAC play. They outscored their opponents 261–65.

== Schedule ==
Date	Opponent	Site	Result	Attendance	Source
September 22	at Muskingum	McConagha Stadium; New Concord, OH	W 14–6	5,600	
September 29	Baldwin–Wallace	Rubber Bowl; Akron, OH	W 13–7	36,563	
October 6	at Ohio Wesleyan	Selby Field; Delaware, OH	W 41–0	4,162	
October 13	Heidelberg	Rubber Bowl; Akron, OH	W 33–6	8,000	
October 20	Wooster	Rubber Bowl; Akron, OH	W 42–0	6,240	
October 27	at Capital	Bexley, OH	W 46–12	2,064	
November 3	at Youngstown State*	Rayen Stadium; Youngstown, OH (Steel Tire)	L 13–17	9,500	
November 10	No. 2 Wittenberg	Rubber Bowl; Akron, OH	L 6–17	6,070	
November 17	Mount Union	Rubber Bowl; Akron, OH	W 53–0	978	
*Non-conference game; Rankings from AP Poll released prior to the game

== Personnel ==
=== Players ===
- Tom Adolph - captain and end
- Tony Butowicz - guard
- Chuck Cobb
- George Deo - fullback
- Dick Galloway - tackle
- Ray Glinsky
- George Grosso - end
- Sam Haramis
- Herman Huth - tackle
- Bob Johnson
- John Lahosky - linebacker
- Ed Lopeman
- Tom Lowry
- Joe Mackey - quarterback
- Ray Matthews - halfback
- Joe Richardson
- Darrington Seals - halfback

=== Staff ===
- Head coach - Gordon K. Larson
- Athletic director - Kenneth Cochrane 1964 Akron yearbook, p. 105.
