= 1962 Lehigh Engineers football team =

American college football season

1962 Lehigh Engineers football
- Conference: Middle Atlantic Conference
- University Division
- Record: 3–6 (2–2 MAC)
- Head coach: Mike Cooley (1st season)
- Captains: Patrick Clark; Charles Gibson
- Home stadium: Taylor Stadium

1962 Middle Atlantic Conference football standings
	Conf.					Overall
Team	W		L		T	W		L		T
University Division
Delaware x	5	–	0	–	0	7	–	2	–	0
Bucknell	5	–	1	–	0	6	–	3	–	0
Lehigh	2	–	2	–	0	3	–	6	–	0
Temple	2	–	3	–	0	3	–	6	–	0
Lafayette	2	–	4	–	0	3	–	5	–	0
Gettysburg	2	–	4	–	0	2	–	6	–	0
Muhlenberg	0	–	4	–	0	2	–	7	–	0
Northern College Division
Susquehanna x	5	–	0	–	0	9	–	0	–	0
Moravian	4	–	2	–	0	5	–	3	–	0
Wagner	3	–	3	–	0	4	–	4	–	1
Wilkes	3	–	4	–	0	3	–	4	–	0
Upsala	2	–	3	–	0	4	–	4	–	0
Albright	2	–	3	–	0	3	–	5	–	0
Lycoming	1	–	4	–	0	4	–	4	–	0
Hofstra *	1	–	0	–	0	8	–	2	–	0
Juniata *	2	–	1	–	0	6	–	2	–	0
Southern College Division
Western Maryland x	5	–	1	–	0	8	–	1	–	0
Drexel x	5	–	1	–	0	6	–	2	–	0
Swarthmore	4	–	2	–	0	5	–	2	–	0
Lebanon Valley	4	–	2	–	0	5	–	3	–	0
Pennsylvania Military	5	–	4	–	0	5	–	5	–	0
Dickinson	3	–	5	–	0	3	–	5	–	0
Johns Hopkins	2	–	4	–	0	2	–	6	–	0
Ursinus	2	–	5	–	0	2	–	5	–	0
Haverford	1	–	5	–	0	1	–	6	–	0
Franklin & Marshall	0	–	5	–	0	0	–	8	–	0
West Chester *	0	–	0	–	0	7	–	2	–	0
x – Division champion/co-champions; * – Ineligible for championship due to insufficient conference games

The 1962 Lehigh Engineers football team was an American football team that represented Lehigh University during the 1962 NCAA College Division football season. Lehigh finished third in the Middle Atlantic Conference, University Division, and second in the Middle Three Conference.

In their first year under head coach Mike Cooley, the Engineers compiled a 3–6 record. Patrick Clark and Charles Gibson were the team captains.

Despite posting a losing overall record, Lehigh finished the year at .500 in conference play: a 2–2 record against MAC University Division opponents, and 1–1 against the Middle Three, losing to Rutgers and beating Lafayette.

Lehigh played its home games at Taylor Stadium on the university campus in Bethlehem, Pennsylvania.

== Schedule ==
Date	Opponent	Site	Result	Attendance	Source
September 22	Delaware	Taylor Stadium; Bethlehem, PA (rivalry)	L 0–27	8,000–9,000	
September 29	at Harvard*	Harvard Stadium; Boston, MA	L 7–27	10,000	
October 6	Gettysburg	Taylor Stadium; Bethlehem, PA	W 20–3	8,000–9,000	
October 13	Bucknell	Taylor Stadium; Bethlehem, PA	L 6–32	6,000–8,500	
October 20	Rutgers	Taylor Stadium; Bethlehem, PA	L 13–29	8,000–12,000	
October 27	at Columbia*	Baker Field; New York, NY	L 15–22	6,500–8,275	
November 3	at Colgate*	Colgate Athletic Field; Hamilton, NY	L 0–13	4,200–4,500	
November 10	Merchant Marine*	Taylor Stadium; Bethlehem, PA	W 18–0	5,000	
November 17	at Lafayette	Fisher Field; Easton, PA (The Rivalry)	W 13–6	15,500–18,000	
*Non-conference game
