= 1962 Arkansas AM&N Golden Lions football team =

American college football season

1962 Arkansas AM&N Golden Lions football

Vanguard Bowl, W 39–6 vs. Mississippi Industrial
- Conference: Southwestern Athletic Conference
- Record: 4–5–1 (2–4–1 SWAC)
- Head coach: Vannette W. Johnson (1st season)
- Home stadium: Pumphrey Stadium

1962 Southwestern Athletic Conference football standings
	Conf.					Overall
Team	W		L		T	W		L		T
Jackson State $	6	–	1	–	0	10	–	1	–	0
Texas Southern	5	–	2	–	0	7	–	3	–	0
Grambling	3	–	2	–	2	6	–	2	–	2
Prairie View A&M	4	–	3	–	0	6	–	3	–	0
Southern	3	–	4	–	0	5	–	5	–	0
Arkansas AM&N	2	–	4	–	1	4	–	5	–	1
Alcorn A&M	2	–	5	–	0	4	–	5	–	0
Wiley	1	–	5	–	1	3	–	5	–	1
$ – Conference champion

The 1962 Arkansas AM&N Golden Lions football team represented the Arkansas Agricultural, Mechanical and Normal College (now known as the University of Arkansas at Pine Bluff) as a member of the Southwestern Athletic Conference (SWAC) during the 1962 NCAA College Division football season. Led by first-year head coach Vannette W. Johnson, the Golden Lions compiled an overall record of 4–5–1, with a conference record of 2–4–1, and finished tied for sixth in the SWAC.

== Schedule ==
Date	Opponent	Site	Result	Source
September 22	at Lincoln (MO)*	Lincoln Field; Jefferson City, MO	L 7–12	
September 29	Jarvis*	Pumphrey Stadium; Pine Bluff, AR	W 56–6	
October 6	at Jackson State	Alumni Field; Jackson, MS	L 0–51	
October 13	Southern	Pumphrey Stadium; Pine Bluff, AR	L 0–10	
October 20	at Wiley	Wildcat Stadium; Marshall, TX	W 9–7	
October 27	at Prairie View A&M	Edward L. Blackshear Field; Prairie View, TX	L 0–25	
November 3	Alcorn A&M	Pumphrey Stadium; Pine Bluff, AR	W 10–7	
November 10	at Grambling	Grambling Stadium; Grambling, LA	T 20–20	
November 17	Texas Southern	Pumphrey Stadium; Pine Bluff, AR	L 12–18	
December 8	vs. Mississippi Industrial*	Crump Stadium; Memphis, TN (Vanguard Bowl)	W 39–6	
*Non-conference game
