= 1962 Delaware Fightin' Blue Hens football team =

American college football season

1962 Delaware Fightin' Blue Hens football

MAC University Division champion
- Conference: Middle Atlantic Conference
- University Division
- Record: 7–2 (5–0 MAC)
- Head coach: David M. Nelson (12th season)
- Captain: John Scholato
- Home stadium: Delaware Stadium

1962 Middle Atlantic Conference football standings
	Conf.					Overall
Team	W		L		T	W		L		T
University Division
Delaware x	5	–	0	–	0	7	–	2	–	0
Bucknell	5	–	1	–	0	6	–	3	–	0
Lehigh	2	–	2	–	0	3	–	6	–	0
Temple	2	–	3	–	0	3	–	6	–	0
Lafayette	2	–	4	–	0	3	–	5	–	0
Gettysburg	2	–	4	–	0	2	–	6	–	0
Muhlenberg	0	–	4	–	0	2	–	7	–	0
Northern College Division
Susquehanna x	5	–	0	–	0	9	–	0	–	0
Moravian	4	–	2	–	0	5	–	3	–	0
Wagner	3	–	3	–	0	4	–	4	–	1
Wilkes	3	–	4	–	0	3	–	4	–	0
Upsala	2	–	3	–	0	4	–	4	–	0
Albright	2	–	3	–	0	3	–	5	–	0
Lycoming	1	–	4	–	0	4	–	4	–	0
Hofstra *	1	–	0	–	0	8	–	2	–	0
Juniata *	2	–	1	–	0	6	–	2	–	0
Southern College Division
Western Maryland x	5	–	1	–	0	8	–	1	–	0
Drexel x	5	–	1	–	0	6	–	2	–	0
Swarthmore	4	–	2	–	0	5	–	2	–	0
Lebanon Valley	4	–	2	–	0	5	–	3	–	0
Pennsylvania Military	5	–	4	–	0	5	–	5	–	0
Dickinson	3	–	5	–	0	3	–	5	–	0
Johns Hopkins	2	–	4	–	0	2	–	6	–	0
Ursinus	2	–	5	–	0	2	–	5	–	0
Haverford	1	–	5	–	0	1	–	6	–	0
Franklin & Marshall	0	–	5	–	0	0	–	8	–	0
West Chester *	0	–	0	–	0	7	–	2	–	0
x – Division champion/co-champions; * – Ineligible for championship due to insufficient conference games

The 1962 Delaware Fightin' Blue Hens football team was an American football team that represented the University of Delaware in the Middle Atlantic Conference during the 1962 NCAA College Division football season. In its 12th season under head coach David M. Nelson, the team compiled a 7–2 record (5–0 against MAC opponents), won the MAC University Division championship, and outscored opponents by a total of 219 to 76. John Scholato was the team captain. The team played its home games at Delaware Stadium in Newark, Delaware.

== Schedule ==
Date	Opponent	Rank	Site	Result	Attendance	Source
September 22	at Lehigh		Taylor Stadium; Bethlehem, PA (rivalry)	W 27–0	8,000–9,000	
September 29	at Gettysburg		Memorial Field; Gettysburg, PA	W 49–7	5,000	
October 6	Lafayette	No. 4	Delaware Stadium; Newark, DE	W 28–7	7,600–7,646	
October 13	at Buffalo*	No. 3	Rotary Field; Buffalo, NY	L 19–20	8,500–8,586	
October 20	Villanova*	No. 7	Delaware Stadium; Newark, DE (rivalry)	L 10–22	8,800–9,200	
October 27	Connecticut*^{†}	No. 11	Delaware Stadium; Newark, DE	W 34–0	8,300–8,500	
November 3	Temple	No. 9	Temple Stadium; Philadelphia, PA	W 20–8	4,500	
November 10	Rutgers*	No. 9	Delaware Stadium; Newark, DE	W 23–6	7,500–7,800	
November 17	Bucknell	No. 8	Delaware Stadium; Newark, DE	W 9–6	9,000	
*Non-conference game; ^{†}Homecoming; Rankings from UPI Poll released prior to the game
