= 1962 Chico State Wildcats football team =

American college football season

1962 Chico State Wildcats football
- Conference: Far Western Conference
- Record: 4–4–1 (2–3 FWC)
- Head coach: George Maderos (5th season)
- Home stadium: College Field

1962 Far Western Conference football standings
	Conf.					Overall
Team	W		L		T	W		L		T
San Francisco State $	3	–	1	–	1	6	–	2	–	1
Humboldt State	3	–	2	–	0	7	–	2	–	0
Nevada	2	–	2	–	1	5	–	3	–	1
UC Davis	2	–	3	–	0	5	–	4	–	0
Chico State	2	–	3	–	0	4	–	4	–	1
Sacramento State	2	–	3	–	0	2	–	7	–	0
$ – Conference champion

The 1962 Chico State Wildcats football team represented Chico State College—now known as California State University, Chico—as a member of the Far Western Conference (FWC) during the 1962 NCAA College Division football season. Led by fifth-year head coach George Maderos, Chico State compiled an overall record of 4–4–1 with a mark of 2–3 in conference play, placing in a three-way tie for fourth in the FWC. The team was outscored by its opponents 149 to 120 for the season. The Wildcats played home games at College Field in Chico, California.

== Schedule ==
Date	Opponent	Site	Result	Attendance	Source
September 22	at Southern Oregon*	Fuller Field; Ashland, OR	L 0–28		
September 29	Pacific (OR)*	College Field; Chico, CA	W 19–13		
October 6	Nevada	College Field; Chico, CA	W 21–7	3,000	
October 13	Linfield*	College Field; Chico, CA	T 6–6		
October 20	at Sacramento State	Charles C. Hughes Stadium; Sacramento, CA	L 23–40	4,231	
October 27	Santa Clara*	College Field; Chico, CA	W 25–12	6,000	
November 3	at Humboldt State	Redwood Bowl; Arcata, CA	L 0–19	6,500	
November 10	UC Davis	College Field; Chico, CA	W 20–14	5,000	
November 17	at San Francisco State	Cox Stadium; San Francisco, CA	L 6–10	5,800	
*Non-conference game
