= 1939 Tennessee State Tigers football team =

American college football season

1939 Tennessee State Tigers football
- Conference: Midwest Athletic Association
- Record: 4–3–1 (1–2 MWAA)
- Head coach: Lawrence Simmons (1st season)
- Home stadium: Tennessee State College stadium

1939 Midwest Athletic Association football standings
	Conf.					Overall
Team	W		L		T	W		L		T
Wilberforce $	4	–	1	–	0	5	–	2	–	0
Kentucky State	3	–	1	–	0	6	–	1	–	0
Lincoln (MO)	2	–	2	–	0	4	–	3	–	0
West Virginia State	2	–	2	–	0	2	–	3	–	1
Tennessee State	1	–	2	–	0	3	–	3	–	1
Louisville Municipal	0	–	4	–	0	1	–	4	–	0
$ – Conference champion

The 1939 Tennessee State Tigers football team represented Tennessee Agricultural & Industrial State College—now known as Tennessee State University—as a member of the Midwest Athletic Association (MWAA) during the 1939 college football season. Led by first-year head coach Lawrence Simmons, the Tigers compiled an overall record of 4–3–1 with a mark of 1–2 conference play, placing fifth in the MWAA.

== Schedule ==
Date	Time	Opponent	Site	Result	Attendance	Source
October 7		Alabama State*	Tennessee State College stadium; Nashville, TN	W 14–13		
October 14		Mississippi Industrial*	Nashville, TN	W 72–0		
October 21	1:30 p.m.	at Johnson C. Smith*	American Legion Memorial Stadium; Charlotte, NC	L 0–3	4,000	
October 28		at Wilberforce	Wilberforce field; Wilberforce, OH	L 0–20		
November 4		Alabama A&M*	Nashville, TN	W 34–12		
November 11		at West Virginia State	Lakin Field; Institute, WV	L 7–18		
November 18	2:00 p.m.	at LeMoyne*	Booker T. Washington Stadium; Memphis, TN	T 0–0		
November 30	2:00 p.m.	Lincoln (MO)^{†}	Tennessee State College stadium; Nashville, TN	W 13–6		
*Non-conference game; ^{†}Homecoming; All times are in Central time
