= 1962 Southwest Texas State Bobcats football team =

American college football season

1962 Southwest Texas State Bobcats football
- Conference: Lone Star Conference
- Record: 8–2 (6–1 LSC)
- Head coach: Milton Jowers (5th season)
- Home stadium: Evans Field

1962 Lone Star Conference football standings
	Conf.					Overall
Team	W		L		T	W		L		T
No. 4 Texas A&I $	6	–	0	–	1	9	–	0	–	1
Southwest Texas State	6	–	1	–	0	8	–	2	–	0
Sam Houston State	4	–	2	–	1	5	–	3	–	1
Lamar Tech	4	–	3	–	0	7	–	3	–	0
East Texas State	3	–	3	–	1	5	–	4	–	1
Sul Ross	2	–	5	–	0	4	–	6	–	0
Stephen F. Austin	1	–	6	–	0	1	–	9	–	0
Howard Payne	0	–	6	–	1	1	–	8	–	1
$ – Conference champion; Rankings from NAIA poll

The 1962 Southwest Texas State Bobcats football team was an American football team that represented Southwest Texas State College (now known as Texas State University) during the 1962 NCAA College Division football season as a member of the Lone Star Conference (LSC). In their fifth year under head coach Milton Jowers, the team compiled an overall record of 8–2 with a mark of 6–1 in conference play.

== Schedule ==
Date	Opponent	Rank	Site	Result	Attendance	Source
September 15	Texas Lutheran*		Evans Field; San Marcos, TX	W 25–7	5,000	
September 22	at Tarleton State*		Stephenville, TX	W 29–0		
September 29	Sul Ross		Evans Field; San Marcos, TX	W 34–14	4,000	
October 6	at McMurry*		Public Schools Stadium; Abilene, TX	L 6–14		
October 13	Stephen F. Austin		Evans Field; San Marcos, TX	W 40–7	4,500	
October 20	at Lamar Tech		Greenie Stadium; Beaumont, TX	W 20–13		
October 27	at Sam Houston State		Pritchett Field; Huntsville, TX (rivalry)	W 21–20	12,000	
November 3	East Texas State		Evans Field; San Marcos, TX	W 36–8	7,000	
November 10	at Howard Payne		Lion Stadium; Brownwood, TX	W 61–15		
November 17	No. 7 Texas A&I	No. 10	Evans Field; San Marcos, TX	L 7–28	11,000	
*Non-conference game; Rankings from AP Poll released prior to the game
