= 1962 UC Davis Aggies football team =

American college football season

1962 UC Davis Aggies football
- Conference: Far Western Conference
- Record: 5–4 (2–3 FWC)
- Head coach: Will Lotter (7th season)
- Captain: Dale Weishahn
- Home stadium: Toomey Field

1962 Far Western Conference football standings
	Conf.					Overall
Team	W		L		T	W		L		T
San Francisco State $	3	–	1	–	1	6	–	2	–	1
Humboldt State	3	–	2	–	0	7	–	2	–	0
Nevada	2	–	2	–	1	5	–	3	–	1
UC Davis	2	–	3	–	0	5	–	4	–	0
Chico State	2	–	3	–	0	4	–	4	–	1
Sacramento State	2	–	3	–	0	2	–	7	–	0
$ – Conference champion

The 1962 UC Davis Aggies football team represented the University of California, Davis as a member of the Far Western Conference (FWC) during the 1962 NCAA College Division football season. Led by seventh-year head coach Will Lotter, the Aggies compiled an overall record of 5–4 with a mark of 2–3 in conference play, placing in a three-way tie for fourth in the FWC. The team outscored its opponents 131 to 110 for the season. The Aggies played home games at Toomey Field in Davis, California.

The UC Davis sports teams were commonly called the "Cal Aggies" from 1924 until the mid-1970s.

== Schedule ==
Date	Opponent	Site	Result	Attendance	Source
September 22	at Santa Clara*	Buck Shaw Stadium; Santa Clara, CA	W 27–6	5,000	
September 29	Pomona*	Toomey Field; Davis, CA	W 41–0	4,000	
October 6	at Whittier*	Hadley Field; Whittier, CA	L 7–40	5,000	
October 13	Nevada	Toomey Field; Davis, CA	W 8–6	300–5,200	
October 20	Humboldt State	Toomey Field; Davis, CA	W 7–0	3,500–4,000	
October 26	San Francisco State	Toomey Field; Davis, CA	L 7–12	2,500–4,000	
November 3	vs. UC Santa Barbara (Note: The game against UC Santa Barbara was part of an "All-UC Doubleheader" that was held annually from 1948 to 1963. The other game of the double-header was California vs. UCLA. The games were always held at the home stadium of either Cal or UCLA.)*	California Memorial Stadium; Berkeley, CA	W 13–0	2,000–6,000	
November 10	at Chico State	College Field; Chico, CA	L 14–20	5,000	
November 17	at Sacramento State	Charles C. Hughes Stadium; Sacramento, CA (rivlary)	L 7–26	4,200–5,184	
*Non-conference game
