= 1962 Wiley Wildcats football team =

American college football season

1962 Wiley Wildcats football
- Conference: Southwestern Athletic Conference
- Record: 3–5–1 (1–5–1 SWAC)
- Head coach: Fred T. Long (32nd season)
- Home stadium: Wildcat Stadium

1962 Southwestern Athletic Conference football standings
| | Conf. | | | | | Overall |
| Team | W | | L | | T | W | | L | | T |
|---|---|---|---|---|---|---|---|---|---|---|
| Jackson State $ | 6 | – | 1 | – | 0 | 10 | – | 1 | – | 0 |
| Texas Southern | 5 | – | 2 | – | 0 | 7 | – | 3 | – | 0 |
| Grambling | 3 | – | 2 | – | 2 | 6 | – | 2 | – | 2 |
| Prairie View A&M | 4 | – | 3 | – | 0 | 6 | – | 3 | – | 0 |
| Southern | 3 | – | 4 | – | 0 | 5 | – | 5 | – | 0 |
| Arkansas AM&N | 2 | – | 4 | – | 1 | 4 | – | 5 | – | 1 |
| Alcorn A&M | 2 | – | 5 | – | 0 | 4 | – | 5 | – | 0 |
| Wiley | 1 | – | 5 | – | 1 | 3 | – | 5 | – | 1 |
$ – Conference champion

The 1962 Wiley Wildcats football team represented Wiley College as a member of the Southwestern Athletic Conference (SWAC) during the 1962 NCAA College Division football season. Led by 32nd-year head coach Fred T. Long, the Wildcats compiled an overall record of 3–5–1, with a conference record of 1–5–1, and finished eighth in the SWAC.

== Schedule ==
| Date | Opponent | Site | Result | Source |
|---|---|---|---|---|
| September 29 | at Alcorn A&M | Henderson Stadium; Lorman, MS | W 28–7 | |
| October 6 | at Bishop* | P.C. Cobb Stadium; Dallas, TX | W 20–7 | |
| October 15 | vs. Prairie View A&M | Cotton Bowl; Dallas, TX (State Fair Classic) | L 17–26 | |
| October 20 | Arkansas AM&N | Wildcat Stadium; Marshall, TX | L 7–9 | |
| October 27 | at Texas Southern | Jeppesen Stadium; Houston, TX | L 7–20 | |
| November 3 | Jackson State | Wildcat Stadium; Marshall, TX | L 13–36 | |
| November 10 | at Southern | University Stadium; Baton Rouge, LA | L 0–24 | |
| November 17 | Grambling | Wildcat Stadium; Marshall, TX | T 0–0 | |
| November 22 | at Dillard* | Alumni Stadium; New Orleans, LA (Thanksgiving Day Classic) | W 20–6 | |
*Non-conference game
