= 1962 Sacramento State Hornets football team =

American college football season

1962 Sacramento State Hornets football
- Conference: Far Western Conference
- Record: 2–7 (2–3 FWC)
- Head coach: Ray Clemons (2nd season)
- Home stadium: Charles C. Hughes Stadium

1962 Far Western Conference football standings
	Conf.					Overall
Team	W		L		T	W		L		T
San Francisco State $	3	–	1	–	1	6	–	2	–	1
Humboldt State	3	–	2	–	0	7	–	2	–	0
Nevada	2	–	2	–	1	5	–	3	–	1
UC Davis	2	–	3	–	0	5	–	4	–	0
Chico State	2	–	3	–	0	4	–	4	–	1
Sacramento State	2	–	3	–	0	2	–	7	–	0
$ – Conference champion

The 1962 Sacramento State Hornets football team represented Sacramento State College—now known as California State University, Sacramento—as a member of the Far Western Conference (FWC) during the 1962 NCAA College Division football season. Led by second-year head coach Ray Clemons, Sacramento State compiled an overall record of 2–7 with a mark of 2–3 in conference play, tying for fourth place in the FWC. For the season the team was outscored by its opponents 161 to 122. The Hornets played home games at Charles C. Hughes Stadium in Sacramento, California.

== Schedule ==
Date	Opponent	Site	Result	Attendance	Source
September 15	at Whittier*	Hadley Field; Whittier, CA	L 0–14	4,587	
September 22	Cal Poly Pomona*	Charles C. Hughes Stadium; Sacramento, CA	L 7–12	2,100–2,146	
September 29	Long Beach State*	Charles C. Hughes Stadium; Sacramento, CA	L 9–13	2,779	
October 6	at Southern Oregon*	Fuller Field; Ashland, OR	L 7–21	1,153	
October 20	Chico State	Charles C. Hughes Stadium; Sacramento, CA	W 40–23	4,231	
November 3	at Nevada	Mackay Stadium (Note: This stadium is the predecessor to the current Mackay Stadium, which was opened for the 1966 season.); Reno, NV	L 12–23	2,900–3,551	
November 10	at San Francisco State	Cox Stadium; San Francisco, CA	L 7–28	2,576	
November 17	UC Davis	Charles C. Hughes Stadium; Sacramento, CA (rivalry)	W 26–74	5,184	
November 22	at Humboldt State	Redwood Bowl; Arcata, CA	L 14–20	5,000–6,010	
*Non-conference game
