= 1962 Western Kentucky Hilltoppers football team =

American college football season

1962 Western Kentucky Hilltoppers football
- Conference: Ohio Valley Conference
- Record: 5–3 (3–3 OVC)
- Head coach: Nick Denes (6th season)
- Captain: Lee Murray

1962 Ohio Valley Conference football standings
	Conf.					Overall
Team	W		L		T	W		L		T
East Tennessee State +	4	–	2	–	0	7	–	3	–	0
Eastern Kentucky +	4	–	2	–	0	6	–	3	–	0
Morehead State +	4	–	2	–	0	5	–	3	–	0
Middle Tennessee +	4	–	2	–	0	6	–	4	–	0
Western Kentucky	3	–	3	–	0	5	–	3	–	0
Murray State	1	–	5	–	0	5	–	5	–	0
Tennessee Tech	1	–	5	–	0	2	–	8	–	0
+ – Conference co-champions

The 1962 Western Kentucky Hilltoppers football team represented Western Kentucky State College (now known as Western Kentucky University) as a member of the Ohio Valley Conference (OVC) during the 1962 NCAA College Division football season. Led by sixth-year head coach Nick Denes, the Hilltoppers compiled an overall record of 5–3 with a mark of 3–3 in conference play, plaching fifth place in the OVC. The team's captain was Lee Murray.

== Schedule ==
Date	Opponent	Site	Result	Attendance	Source
September 15	Southeast Missouri State*	Bowling Green, KY	W 28–7	3,500	
September 22	at East Tennessee State	Johnson City, TN	L 7–27	5,000	
September 29	Middle Tennessee	Bowling Green, KY (rivalry)	L 0–17	5,000	
October 6	Austin Peay*	Bowling Green, KY	W 21–13	4,500	
October 13	at Tennessee Tech	Cookeville, TN	W 24–7	8,000	
October 27	Eastern Kentucky^{†}	Bowling Green, KY (rivalry)	L 5–6	7,500	
November 3	at Morehead State	Morehead, KY	W 7–0	5,000	
November 10	at Murray State	Cutchin Stadium; Murray, KY (rivalry)	W 16–15	8,000	
*Non-conference game; ^{†}Homecoming
