= 1962 Lamar Tech Cardinals football team =

American college football season

1962 Lamar Tech Cardinals football
- Conference: Lone Star Conference
- Record: 7–3 (4–3 LSC)
- Head coach: James B. Higgins (10th season)
- Captain: Harold Mayo
- Home stadium: Greenie Stadium

1962 Lone Star Conference football standings
	Conf.					Overall
Team	W		L		T	W		L		T
No. 4 Texas A&I $	6	–	0	–	1	9	–	0	–	1
Southwest Texas State	6	–	1	–	0	8	–	2	–	0
Sam Houston State	4	–	2	–	1	5	–	3	–	1
Lamar Tech	4	–	3	–	0	7	–	3	–	0
East Texas State	3	–	3	–	1	5	–	4	–	1
Sul Ross	2	–	5	–	0	4	–	6	–	0
Stephen F. Austin	1	–	6	–	0	1	–	9	–	0
Howard Payne	0	–	6	–	1	1	–	8	–	1
$ – Conference champion; Rankings from NAIA poll

The 1962 Lamar Tech Cardinals football team represented Lamar State College of Technology—now known as Lamar University—as a member of the Lone Star Conference (LSC) during the 1962 NCAA College Division football season. Led by James B. Higgins in his tenth and final season as head coach, the Cardinals compiled an overall record of an 7–3 with a mark of 4–3 in conference play, placing fourth in the LSC. Lamar Tech played home games at Greenie Stadium in Beaumont, Texas.

1962 was the program's final season as a member of the Lone Star Conference. Lamar Tech competed as an independent in 1963 and joined the Southland Conference in 1964. Higgins was named NCAA College Division Coach of the Year for Region VII following the season. He remained at Lamar as athletic director until 1982.

== Schedule ==
Date	Opponent	Site	Result	Attendance	Source
September 15	Mexico Polytechical Institute*	Greenie Stadium; Beaumont, TX	W 34–6	5,000	
September 22	at Northeast Louisiana State*	Brown Stadium; Monroe, LA	W 14–0	5,800–6,000	
September 29	Abilene Christian*	Greenie Stadium; Beaumont, TX	W 13–6	7,500	
October 6	at Stephen F. Austin	Memorial Stadium; Nacogdoches, TX	W 27–12	7,500	
October 13	at Sul Ross	Jackson Field; Alpine, TX	W 28–14	1,500	
October 20	Southwest Texas State	Greenie Stadium; Beaumont, TX	L 20–13	7,500	
October 27	Howard Payne	Lion Stadium; Brownwood, TX	W 21–10	3,000	
November 3	No. 8 Texas A&I	Greenie Stadium; Beaumont, TX	L 0–7	8,300	
November 10	at East Texas State	Memorial Stadium; Commerce, TX	W 28–6	9,500	
November 17	Sam Houston State	Greenie Stadium; Beaumont, TX	L 7–23	8,000–8,500	
*Non-conference game; Rankings from AP Poll released prior to the game
