= 1962 Alcorn A&M Braves football team =

American college football season

1962 Alcorn A&M Braves football
- Conference: Southwestern Athletic Conference
- Record: 4–5 (2–5 SWAC)
- Head coach: Frank Purnell (3rd season)
- Home stadium: Henderson Stadium

1962 Southwestern Athletic Conference football standings
	Conf.					Overall
Team	W		L		T	W		L		T
Jackson State $	6	–	1	–	0	10	–	1	–	0
Texas Southern	5	–	2	–	0	7	–	3	–	0
Grambling	3	–	2	–	2	6	–	2	–	2
Prairie View A&M	4	–	3	–	0	6	–	3	–	0
Southern	3	–	4	–	0	5	–	5	–	0
Arkansas AM&N	2	–	4	–	1	4	–	5	–	1
Alcorn A&M	2	–	5	–	0	4	–	5	–	0
Wiley	1	–	5	–	1	3	–	5	–	1
$ – Conference champion

The 1962 Alcorn A&M Braves football team represented Alcorn A&M College (now known as Alcorn State University) as a member of the Southwestern Athletic Conference (SWAC) during the 1962 NCAA College Division football season. Led by third-year head coach Frank Purnell, the Braves compiled an overall record of 4–5, with a conference record of 2–5, and finished seventh in the SWAC.

== Schedule ==
Date	Opponent	Site	Result	Attendance	Source
September 22	Rust*	Henderson Stadium; Lorman, MS	W 52–0		
September 29	Wiley	Henderson Stadium; Lorman, MS	L 7–28		
October 13	Jackson State	Henderson Stadium; Lorman, MS	L 0–34		
October 20	Texas Southern	Henderson Stadium; Lorman, MS	W 39–15		
October 27	Southern	Henderson Stadium; Lorman, MS	W 21–14		
November 3	at Arkansas AM&N	Pumphrey Stadium; Pine Bluff, AR	L 7–10		
November 10	at Mississippi Vocational*	Magnolia Stadium; Itta Bena, MS	W 23–13		
November 17	at Prairie View A&M	Edward L. Blackshear Field; Prairie View, TX	L 7–59	10,000	
November 24	at Grambling	Grambling Stadium; Grambling, LA	L 7–46		
*Non-conference game
