= 1962 Grambling Tigers football team =

American college football season

1962 Grambling Tigers football
- Conference: Southwestern Athletic Conference
- Record: 6–2–2 (3–2–2 SWAC)
- Head coach: Eddie Robinson (20th season)
- Home stadium: Grambling Stadium

1962 Southwestern Athletic Conference football standings
	Conf.					Overall
Team	W		L		T	W		L		T
Jackson State $	6	–	1	–	0	10	–	1	–	0
Texas Southern	5	–	2	–	0	7	–	3	–	0
Grambling	3	–	2	–	2	6	–	2	–	2
Prairie View A&M	4	–	3	–	0	6	–	3	–	0
Southern	3	–	4	–	0	5	–	5	–	0
Arkansas AM&N	2	–	4	–	1	4	–	5	–	1
Alcorn A&M	2	–	5	–	0	4	–	5	–	0
Wiley	1	–	5	–	1	3	–	5	–	1
$ – Conference champion

The 1962 Grambling Tigers football team represented Grambling College (now known as Grambling State University) as a member of the Southwestern Athletic Conference (SWAC) during the 1962 NCAA College Division football season. Led by 20th-year head coach Eddie Robinson, the Tigers compiled an overall record of 6–2–2 and a mark of 3–2–2 in conference play, and finished third in the SWAC.

== Schedule ==
Date	Opponent	Site	Result	Attendance	Source
September 15	Benedict*	Grambling Stadium; Grambling, LA	W 55–0	6,000	
September 29	at Southern	University Stadium; Baton Rouge, LA (rivalry)	W 13–3		
October 6	Tennessee A&I*	Grambling Stadium; Grambling, LA	W 26–6		
October 13	at Mississippi Vocational*	Magnolia Stadium; Itta Bena, MS	W 41–6		
October 20	at Prairie View A&M	Edward L. Blackshear Field; Prairie View, TX (rivalry)	W 23–15		
October 27	Jackson State	Grambling Stadium; Grambling, LA	L 31–45		
November 3	at Texas Southern	Jeppesen Stadium; Houston, TX	L 25–42		
November 10	Arkansas AM&N	Grambling Stadium; Grambling, LA	T 20–20		
November 17	at Wiley	Wiley Field; Marshall, TX	T 0–0		
November 24	Alcorn A&M	Grambling Stadium; Grambling, LA	W 46–7		
*Non-conference game
