= 1962 Sam Houston State Bearkats football team =

American college football season

1962 Sam Houston State Bearkats football
- Conference: Lone Star Conference
- Record: 5–3–1 (4–2–1 LSC)
- Head coach: Paul Pierce (11th season)
- Home stadium: Pritchett Field

1962 Lone Star Conference football standings
	Conf.					Overall
Team	W		L		T	W		L		T
No. 4 Texas A&I $	6	–	0	–	1	9	–	0	–	1
Southwest Texas State	6	–	1	–	0	8	–	2	–	0
Sam Houston State	4	–	2	–	1	5	–	3	–	1
Lamar Tech	4	–	3	–	0	7	–	3	–	0
East Texas State	3	–	3	–	1	5	–	4	–	1
Sul Ross	2	–	5	–	0	4	–	6	–	0
Stephen F. Austin	1	–	6	–	0	1	–	9	–	0
Howard Payne	0	–	6	–	1	1	–	8	–	1
$ – Conference champion; Rankings from NAIA poll

The 1962 Sam Houston State Bearkats football team represented Sam Houston State Teachers College (now known as Sam Houston State University) as a member of the Lone Star Conference (LSC) during the 1962 NAIA football season. Led by 11th-year head coach Paul Pierce, the Bearkats compiled an overall record of 5–3–1 with a mark of 4–2–1 in conference play, and finished third in the LSC.

== Schedule ==
Date	Opponent	Site	Result	Attendance	Source
September 15	at Louisiana College*	Alumni Field; Pineville, LA	L 0–8	5,000	
September 22	Corpus Christi*	Pritchett Field; Huntsville, TX	W 26–0	10,000	
October 6	at Howard Payne	Lion Field; Brownwood, TX	T 0–0		
October 13	East Texas State	Pritchett Field; Huntsville, TX	W 15–14		
October 20	at Texas A&I	Javelina Stadium; Kingsville, TX	L 3–27	9,000–10,000	
October 27	Southwest Texas State	Pritchett Field; Huntsville, TX	L 20–21	12,000	
November 3	at Sul Ross	Jackson Field; Alpine, TX	W 20–6	2,000	
November 10	Stephen F. Austin	Pritchett Field; Huntsville, TX (rivalry)	W 29–26	6,000	
November 17	at Lamar Tech	Greenie Stadium; Beaumont, TX	W 23–7	8,000–8,500	
*Non-conference game
