= 1962 Prairie View A&M Panthers football team =

American college football season

1962 Prairie View A&M Panthers football

Prairie View Bowl, W 37–16 vs. Central State (OH)
- Conference: Southwestern Athletic Conference
- Record: 6–3 (4–3 SWAC)
- Head coach: Billy Nicks (14th season)
- Home stadium: Edward L. Blackshear Field

1962 Southwestern Athletic Conference football standings
	Conf.					Overall
Team	W		L		T	W		L		T
Jackson State $	6	–	1	–	0	10	–	1	–	0
Texas Southern	5	–	2	–	0	7	–	3	–	0
Grambling	3	–	2	–	2	6	–	2	–	2
Prairie View A&M	4	–	3	–	0	6	–	3	–	0
Southern	3	–	4	–	0	5	–	5	–	0
Arkansas AM&N	2	–	4	–	1	4	–	5	–	1
Alcorn A&M	2	–	5	–	0	4	–	5	–	0
Wiley	1	–	5	–	1	3	–	5	–	1
$ – Conference champion

The 1962 Prairie View A&M Panthers football team represented Prairie View A&M College of Texas (now known as Prairie View A&M University) as a member of the Southwestern Athletic Conference (SWAC) during the 1962 NCAA College Division football season. Led by 14th-year head coach Billy Nicks, the Panthers compiled an overall record of 6–3, with a conference record of 4–3, and finished fourth in the SWAC.

== Schedule ==
Date	Opponent	Site	Result	Attendance	Source
September 22	at Jackson State	Alumni Field; Jackson, MS	L 7–41		
October 6	at Texas Southern	Jeppesen Stadium; Houston, TX (rivalry)	L 14–21		
October 15	vs. Wiley	Cotton Bowl; Dallas, TX (State Fair Classic)	W 26–17		
October 20	Grambling	Edward L. Blackshear Field; Prairie View, TX	L 15–23		
October 27	Arkansas AM&N	Edward L. Blackshear Field; Prairie View, TX	W 25–0		
November 10	at Bishop*	Bishop Stadium; Dallas, TX	W 23–0		
November 17	Alcorn A&M	Edward L. Blackshear Field; Prairie View, TX	W 59–7	10,000	
November 24	Southern	Jeppesen Stadium; Houston, TX	W 34–14		
December 1	Central State (OH)*	Jeppesen Stadium; Houston, TX (Prairie View Bowl)	W 37–16		
*Non-conference game
