= 1962 Texas Southern Tigers football team =

American college football season

1962 Texas Southern Tigers football
- Conference: Southwestern Athletic Conference
- Record: 7–3 (5–2 SWAC)
- Head coach: Alexander Durley (14th season)
- Home stadium: Jeppesen Stadium

1962 Southwestern Athletic Conference football standings
	Conf.					Overall
Team	W		L		T	W		L		T
Jackson State $	6	–	1	–	0	10	–	1	–	0
Texas Southern	5	–	2	–	0	7	–	3	–	0
Grambling	3	–	2	–	2	6	–	2	–	2
Prairie View A&M	4	–	3	–	0	6	–	3	–	0
Southern	3	–	4	–	0	5	–	5	–	0
Arkansas AM&N	2	–	4	–	1	4	–	5	–	1
Alcorn A&M	2	–	5	–	0	4	–	5	–	0
Wiley	1	–	5	–	1	3	–	5	–	1
$ – Conference champion

The 1962 Texas Southern Tigers football team was an American football team that represented Texas Southern University as a member of the Southwestern Athletic Conference (SWAC) during the 1962 NCAA College Division football season. Led by 14th-year head coach Alexander Durley, the Tigers compiled an overall record of 7–3, with a mark of 5–2 in conference play, and finished second in the SWAC.

== Schedule ==
Date	Opponent	Site	Result	Source
September 22	vs. Southern	Public School Stadium; Galveston, TX	W 20–6	
September 29	Bishop*	Jeppesen Stadium; Houston, TX	W 42–6	
October 6	Prairie View A&M	Jeppesen Stadium; Houston, TX (rivalry)	W 21–14	
October 13	at Lackland Air Force Base*	Lackland Stadium; San Antonio, TX	W 20–7	
October 20	at Alcorn A&M	Henderson Stadium; Lorman, MS	L 15–39	
October 27	Wiley	Jeppesen Stadium; Houston, TX	W 20–7	
November 3	Grambling	Jeppesen Stadium; Houston, TX	W 42–25	
November 10	vs. Jackson State	Ernest F. Ladd Memorial Stadium; Mobile, AL	L 13–26	
November 17	at Arkansas AM&N	Pumphrey Stadium; Pine Bluff, AR	W 18–12	
November 24	vs. Florida A&M*	Gator Bowl Stadium; Jacksonville, FL	L 18–28	
*Non-conference game
