= 1962 Middle Tennessee Blue Raiders football team =

American college football season

1962 Middle Tennessee Blue Raiders football

OVC co-champion
- Conference: Ohio Valley Conference
- Record: 6–4 (4–2 OVC)
- Head coach: Charles M. Murphy (16th season)
- Captains: Evans; Winters; Drennon
- Home stadium: Horace Jones Field

1962 Ohio Valley Conference football standings
	Conf.					Overall
Team	W		L		T	W		L		T
East Tennessee State +	4	–	2	–	0	7	–	3	–	0
Eastern Kentucky +	4	–	2	–	0	6	–	3	–	0
Morehead State +	4	–	2	–	0	5	–	3	–	0
Middle Tennessee +	4	–	2	–	0	6	–	4	–	0
Western Kentucky	3	–	3	–	0	5	–	3	–	0
Murray State	1	–	5	–	0	5	–	5	–	0
Tennessee Tech	1	–	5	–	0	2	–	8	–	0
+ – Conference co-champions

The 1962 Middle Tennessee Blue Raiders football team represented the Middle Tennessee State College—now known as Middle Tennessee State University—as a member of the Ohio Valley Conference (OVC) during the 1962 NCAA College Division football season. Led by 16th-year head coach Charles M. Murphy, the Blue Raiders compiled a record an overall record of 6–4 with a mark of 4–2 in conference play, sharing the OVC title with East Tennessee State, Eastern Kentucky, and Morehead State. The team's captains were Evans, Winters, and Drennon.

== Schedule ==
Date	Opponent	Site	Result	Attendance	Source
September 15	Austin Peay*	Horace Jones Field; Murfreesboro, TN	W 28–0	6,000	
September 22	Morehead State	Horace Jones Field; Murfreesboro, TN	W 7–0	7,000	
September 29	at Western Kentucky	Bowling Green, KY (rivalry)	W 17–0	5,000–5,500	
October 6	Eastern Kentucky	Horace Jones Field; Murfreesboro, TN	L 8–28	8,000	
October 13	at Pensacola Navy*	Warrington, FL	L 0–14	3,000	
October 20	at Chattanooga*	Chamberlain Field; Chattanooga, TN	L 13–34	7,000–8,500	
October 28	Florence State*	Horace Jones Field; Murfreesboro, TN	W 33–2	8,000	
November 3	Murray State	Horace Jones Field; Murfreesboro, TN	W 23–6	8,000	
November 10	at East Tennessee State	State College Stadium; Johnson City, TN	L 12–20	2,000	
November 22	at Tennessee Tech	Overhill Field; Cookeville, TN	W 20–0	6,500	
*Non-conference game
