= 1962 Jackson State Tigers football team =

American college football season

1962 Jackson State Tigers football

Black college national champion SWAC champion

Orange Blossom Classic, W 22–6 vs. Florida A&M
- Conference: Southwestern Athletic Conference
- Record: 10–1 (6–1 SWAC)
- Head coach: John Merritt (11th season)
- Home stadium: Alumni Field

1962 Southwestern Athletic Conference football standings
	Conf.					Overall
Team	W		L		T	W		L		T
Jackson State $	6	–	1	–	0	10	–	1	–	0
Texas Southern	5	–	2	–	0	7	–	3	–	0
Grambling	3	–	2	–	2	6	–	2	–	2
Prairie View A&M	4	–	3	–	0	6	–	3	–	0
Southern	3	–	4	–	0	5	–	5	–	0
Arkansas AM&N	2	–	4	–	1	4	–	5	–	1
Alcorn A&M	2	–	5	–	0	4	–	5	–	0
Wiley	1	–	5	–	1	3	–	5	–	1
$ – Conference champion

The 1962 Jackson State Tigers football team was an American football team that represented Jackson State College for Negroes—now known as Jackson State University as a member of the Southwestern Athletic Conference (SWAC) during the 1962 NCAA College Division football season. In their 11th season under head coach John Merritt, the Tigers compiled an overall record of 10–1 record with a mark of 6–1 against conference opponents, won the SWAC title, defeated Florida A&M in the Orange Blossom Classic, and outscored all opponents by a total of 411 to 101.

The Tigers were recognized by the Pittsburgh Courier as the 1962 black college national champion. Another source selected Florida A&M as the national champion despite Jackson State's 22–6 victory over Florida A&M in the Orange Blossom Classic.

Key players for Jackson State included quarterback Roy Curry and end Willie Richardson. Richardson was later inducted into the College Football Hall of Fame.

At the start of the fall 1962 semester, James Meredith drew national attention when he transferred from Jackson State to the previously all-white University of Mississippi.

== Schedule ==
Date	Opponent	Site	Result	Attendance	Source
September 15	at Mississippi Industrial*	Clarksdale, MS	W 56–6		
September 22	Prairie View A&M	Alumni Field; Jackson, MS	W 41–7		
September 29	Mississippi Vocational*	Alumni Field; Jackson, MS	W 50–0		
October 6	Arkansas AM&N	Alumni Field; Jackson, MS	W 51–0		
October 13	at Alcorn A&M	Henderson Stadium; Lorman, MS (rivalry)	W 34–0		
October 20	at Southern	University Stadium; Baton Rouge, LA (rivalry)	L 14–19		
October 27	at Grambling	Grambling Stadium; Grambling, LA	W 45–31		
November 3	at Wiley	Wildcat Stadium; Marshall, TX	W 36–13		
November 10	vs. Texas Southern	Ernest F. Ladd Memorial Stadium; Mobile, AL	W 26–13		
December 1	Tennessee A&I	Alumni Field; Jackson, MS	W 36–6	> 7,000	
December 8	vs. Florida A&M	Miami Orange Bowl; Miami, FL (Orange Blossom Classic)	W 22–6	43,461	
*Non-conference game
