= 1962 Texas A&I Javelinas football team =

American college football season

1962 Texas A&I Javelinas football

LSC champion
- Conference: Lone Star Conference
- Record: 9–0–1 (6–0–1 LSC)
- Head coach: Gil Steinke (9th season)
- Captains: Barry Copenhaver; Doug Harvey
- Home stadium: Javelina Stadium

1962 Lone Star Conference football standings
| | Conf. | | | | | Overall |
| Team | W | | L | | T | W | | L | | T |
|---|---|---|---|---|---|---|---|---|---|---|
| No. 4 Texas A&I $ | 6 | – | 0 | – | 1 | 9 | – | 0 | – | 1 |
| Southwest Texas State | 6 | – | 1 | – | 0 | 8 | – | 2 | – | 0 |
| Sam Houston State | 4 | – | 2 | – | 1 | 5 | – | 3 | – | 1 |
| Lamar Tech | 4 | – | 3 | – | 0 | 7 | – | 3 | – | 0 |
| East Texas State | 3 | – | 3 | – | 1 | 5 | – | 4 | – | 1 |
| Sul Ross | 2 | – | 5 | – | 0 | 4 | – | 6 | – | 0 |
| Stephen F. Austin | 1 | – | 6 | – | 0 | 1 | – | 9 | – | 0 |
| Howard Payne | 0 | – | 6 | – | 1 | 1 | – | 8 | – | 1 |
$ – Conference champion; Rankings from NAIA poll

The 1962 Texas A&I Javelinas football team was an American football team that represented the Texas College of Arts and Industries (now known as Texas A&M University–Kingsville) as a member of the Lone Star Conference during the 1962 NAIA football season. In its ninth year under head coach Gil Steinke, the team compiled a 9–0–1 record (6–0–1 against conference opponents), won the Lone Star Conference championship, and outscored opponents by a total of 233 to 64. The team's only setback was a tie with East Texas State. The team was ranked 6 in the final AP small college poll and No. 9 in the UPI coaches poll. The team played its home games at Javelina Stadium in Kingsville, Texas.

== Schedule ==
| Date | Opponent | Rank | Site | Result | Attendance | Source |
|---|---|---|---|---|---|---|
| September 15 | Southern Illinois* | | Javelina Stadium; Kingsville, TX | W 14–10 | | |
| September 22 | at Trinity (TX)* | | San Antonio, TX | W 33–27 | | |
| September 29 | Howard Payne | | Javelina Stadium; Kingsville, TX | W 22–0 | | |
| October 6 | at East Texas State | | Commerce, TX | T 3–3 | | |
| October 13 | Corpus Christi* | | Javelina Stadium; Kingsville, TX | W 27–6 | 6,000 | |
| October 20 | Sam Houston State^{†} | | Javelina Stadium; Kingsville, TX | W 27–3 | 9,000 | |
| October 27 | Stephen F. Austin | | Javelina Stadium; Kingsville, TX | W 31–8 | 7,000 | |
| November 3 | at Lamar Tech | No. 8 | Beaumont, TX | W 7–0 | | |
| November 10 | Sul Ross | No. 7 | Javelina Stadium; Kingsville, TX | W 41–0 | | |
| November 17 | at No. 10 Southwest Texas State | No. 7 | Evans Field; San Marcos, TX | W 28–7 | 11,000 | |
*Non-conference game; ^{†}Homecoming; Rankings from AP Poll released prior to the game
