= 1962 Southern Jaguars football team =

American college football season

1962 Southern Jaguars football
- Conference: Southwestern Athletic Conference
- Record: 5–5 (3–4 SWAC)
- Head coach: Robert Henry Lee (1st season)
- Home stadium: University Stadium

1962 Southwestern Athletic Conference football standings
	Conf.					Overall
Team	W		L		T	W		L		T
Jackson State $	6	–	1	–	0	10	–	1	–	0
Texas Southern	5	–	2	–	0	7	–	3	–	0
Grambling	3	–	2	–	2	6	–	2	–	2
Prairie View A&M	4	–	3	–	0	6	–	3	–	0
Southern	3	–	4	–	0	5	–	5	–	0
Arkansas AM&N	2	–	4	–	1	4	–	5	–	1
Alcorn A&M	2	–	5	–	0	4	–	5	–	0
Wiley	1	–	5	–	1	3	–	5	–	1
$ – Conference champion

The 1962 Southern Jaguars football team was an American football team that represented Southern University as a member of the Southwestern Athletic Conference (SWAC) during the 1962 NCAA College Division football season. Led by Robert Henry Lee in his first season as head coach, the Jaguars compiled an overall record of 5–5, with a mark of 3–4 in conference play, and finished fifth in the SWAC.

== Schedule ==
Date	Opponent	Site	Result	Attendance	Source
September 22	vs. Texas Southern	Public School Stadium; Galveston, TX	L 6–20		
September 29	Grambling	University Stadium; Baton Rouge, LA (rivalry)	L 3–13		
October 6	at Dillard*	City Park Stadium; New Orleans, LA	W 27–0	10,000	
October 13	at Arkansas AM&N	Pumphrey Stadium; Pine Bluff, AR	W 10–0		
October 20	Jackson State	University Stadium; Baton Rouge, LA (rivalry)	W 19–14		
October 27	at Alcorn A&M	Henderson Stadium; Lorman, MS	L 14–21		
November 3	at Tennessee A&I*	Hale Stadium; Nashville, TN	W 13–0		
November 10	Wiley	University Stadium; Baton Rouge, LA	W 24–0		
November 17	Florida A&M*	University Stadium; Baton Rouge, LA	L 0–25		
November 24	at Prairie View A&M	Jeppesen Stadium; Houston, TX	L 14–34		
*Non-conference game
