= 1962 Florida A&M Rattlers football team =

American college football season

1962 Florida A&M Rattlers football

AP small college national champion SIAC co-champion

Orange Blossom Classic, L 6–22 vs. Jackson State
- Conference: Southern Intercollegiate Athletic Conference
- Record: 9–1 (5–0 SIAC)
- Head coach: Jake Gaither (18th season)
- Home stadium: Bragg Memorial Stadium

1962 Southern Intercollegiate Athletic Conference football standings
	Conf.					Overall
Team	W		L		T	W		L		T
No. 2 Florida A&M +	5	–	0	–	0	9	–	1	–	0
Alabama A&M +	6	–	0	–	0	8	–	2	–	0
Morehouse	5	–	1	–	0	6	–	2	–	0
Clark (GA)	5	–	1	–	0	6	–	1	–	0
Bethune–Cookman	5	–	2	–	0	7	–	2	–	0
Fisk	4	–	2	–	0	6	–	2	–	0
South Carolina State	4	–	3	–	0	5	–	3	–	0
Benedict	3	–	3	–	0	5	–	5	–	0
Morris Brown	2	–	4	–	0	4	–	5	–	0
Allen	1	–	4	–	0	3	–	6	–	0
Tuskegee	3	–	3	–	0	4	–	5	–	0
Lane	2	–	4	–	0	2	–	7	–	0
Fort Valley State	0	–	5	–	0	2	–	7	–	0
Alabama State	0	–	6	–	0	0	–	8	–	0
Knoxville	0	–	6	–	0	0	–	8	–	0
+ – Conference co-champions; Standings were based on Dickinson System ratings.; Rankings from NAIA poll

The 1962 Florida A&M Rattlers football team was an American football team that represented Florida A&M University as a member of the Southern Intercollegiate Athletic Conference (SIAC) in the 1962 NCAA College Division football season. In their 18th season under head coach Jake Gaither, the Rattlers compiled a 9–1 record, were ranked No. 1 in the final AP small college poll and No. 2 in the final UPI coaches poll, and suffered its sole loss to Jackson State in the Orange Blossom Classic. Florida A&M shared the SIAC title with Alabama A&M.

The team included halfback Bob Hayes who tied the world record for the 100-yard dash. The team's statistical leaders included Robert Paremore with 629 rushing yards, 10 touchdowns and 64 points scored, Jim Tullis with 957 passing yards, and Al Denson with 461 receiving yards.

== Schedule ==
Date	Opponent	Rank	Site	Result	Attendance	Source
September 29	Benedict		Bragg Memorial Stadium; Tallahassee, FL	W 60–0		
October 6	Lincoln (MO)*	No. 3	Bragg Memorial Stadium; Tallahassee, FL	W 62–6		
October 13	at Morris Brown	No. 1	Herndon Stadium; Atlanta, GA	W 36–12		
October 20	at Bethune–Cookman	No. 1	Welch Memorial Stadium; Daytona Beach, FL	W 52–6	4,200	
October 27	Tennessee A&I*	No. 1	Bragg Memorial Stadium; Tallahassee, FL	W 20–0		
November 3	North Carolina A&T*^{†}	No. 1	Bragg Memorial Stadium; Tallahassee, FL	W 38–6		
November 10	at Allen	No. 1	Perry Stadium; Columbia, SC	W 67–0		
November 17	at Southern*	No. 1	University Stadium; Baton Rouge, LA	W 25–0		
November 24	vs. Texas Southern*	No. 1	Gator Bowl Stadium; Jacksonville, FL	W 28–18	20,000	
December 8	vs. Jackson State*	No. 1	Miami Orange Bowl; Miami, FL (Orange Blossom Classic)	L 6–22	43,461	
*Non-conference game; ^{†}Homecoming; Rankings from AP Poll released prior to the game; Source:
