= Toomey Field =

Track and field stadium in Davis, California

- Location in the United States Location in California
- Interactive map of Toomey Field
- Former names: Aggie Field (1949–1962)
- Location: University of California, Davis; Davis, California, U.S.
- Coordinates: 38.5453°N 121.7483°W
- Owner: University of California, Davis
- Operator: University of California, Davis
- Surface: Natural grass (infield)

Construction
- Opened: November 18, 1949; 76 years ago

Tenants
- UC Davis Aggies football (NCAA) (1949–2006); UC Davis Aggies track and field (1950–present); UC Davis Aggies women’s lacrosse (NCAA) ( –2006)

Toomey Field is a track and field stadium in the western United States, located on the campus of the University of California, Davis in unincorporated Yolo County, California. The Woody Wilson Track is located in the stadium and it is home to the UC Davis Aggies track and field team. The UC Davis Men's Crew team also holds land practices at Toomey Field.

== History ==
At the northeast corner of campus, Aggie Field opened in 1949 and was home to the Aggies' football team through 2006. The first game, on November 18, was a 12–3 victory over Chico State. The record for attendance at the stadium was set on November 12, 1977, with 12,800 for a 37–21 victory over Nevada. The Aggies' all-time record at Toomey Field was 192–86–7 (.686).

The stadium was renamed in 1962 in honor of Crip Toomey, who served as athletic director at UC Davis from 1928 until his death in 1961. Toomey graduated from UC Davis in 1923 and also served as the Aggies' basketball coach and football coach from 1928 to 1936.

The new Aggie Stadium (now UC Davis Health Stadium) on the west side of campus became the football venue in 2007, and Toomey Field continued as the home of Aggies' track and field.

The natural grass playing field (now track infield) was aligned north-northwest to south-southeast at an approximate elevation of fifty feet (15 m) above sea level.
