= 1962 NCAA College Division football season =

American college football season

- Champions: Florida A&M (AP); Southern Miss (UPI); Jackson State and Florida A&M (black)

The 1962 NCAA College Division football season was the seventh season of college football in the United States organized by the National Collegiate Athletic Association (NCAA) at the College Division level.

In the final Associated Press (AP) small-college poll, Florida A&M was the top-rated team. The Rattlers subsequently lost to Jackson State in the Orange Blossom Classic. United Press International (UPI) named Southern Miss as the top-ranked team in their final small-college poll.

== Undefeated teams ==
Five College Division teams compiled perfect seasons in 1962, including any postseason bowl games:

- John Carroll Blue Streaks, 7–0, Presidents' Athletic Conference champion
- Kalamazoo Hornets, 8–0, Michigan Intercollegiate Athletic Association champion
- Saint John's Johnnies, 9–0, Minnesota Intercollegiate Athletic Conference champion (rated No. 9 in the final AP poll)
- Susquehanna Crusaders, 9–0, Middle Atlantic Conference champion of the conference's College Division–Northern
- Wittenberg Tigers, 9–0, Ohio Athletic Conference champion (ranked No.2 in the final AP poll)

== Conference standings ==
1962 California Collegiate Athletic Association football standings
	Conf.					Overall
Team	W		L		T	W		L		T
San Diego State $	5	–	0	–	0	8	–	2	–	0
Fresno State	4	–	1	–	0	7	–	3	–	0
Long Beach State	2	–	3	–	0	5	–	5	–	0
Cal Poly	2	–	3	–	0	4	–	5	–	0
UC Santa Barbara	2	–	3	–	0	2	–	8	–	0
Los Angeles State	0	–	5	–	0	2	–	8	–	0
Valley State	0	–	0	–	0	3	–	6	–	0
$ – Conference champion; Games with Valley State did not count in the conference standings.

1962 Central Intercollegiate Athletic Association football standings
	Conf.					Overall
Team	W		L		T	W		L		T
Morgan State $	8	–	1	–	0	8	–	2	–	0
North Carolina A&T	6	–	1	–	0	7	–	3	–	0
Johnson C. Smith	6	–	1	–	0	7	–	2	–	0
Virginia Union	7	–	2	–	0	7	–	2	–	0
Maryland State	2	–	2	–	1	4	–	2	–	1
North Carolina College	4	–	3	–	0	6	–	3	–	0
Fayetteville State	4	–	2	–	1	4	–	2	–	1
Elizabeth City State	2	–	3	–	3	2	–	3	–	3
Norfolk State	3	–	3	–	0	5	–	3	–	0
Virginia State	3	–	5	–	0	4	–	5	–	0
St. Augustine's	3	–	4	–	1	4	–	4	–	1
Delaware State	3	–	4	–	0	4	–	5	–	0
Winston-Salem State	2	–	5	–	0	3	–	6	–	0
Hampton	3	–	4	–	0	3	–	6	–	0
Livingstone	1	–	3	–	0	2	–	8	–	0
Saint Paul's (VA)	2	–	6	–	0	2	–	6	–	0
Shaw	1	–	7	–	1	1	–	7	–	1
Howard	0	–	6	–	0	1	–	8	–	0
$ – Conference champion

1962 Central Intercollegiate Conference football standings
	Conf.					Overall
Team	W		L		T	W		L		T
Omaha $	4	–	0	–	1	8	–	1	–	1
Fort Hays State	3	–	1	–	1	6	–	2	–	1
Pittsburg State	3	–	2	–	0	6	–	3	–	0
Washburn	2	–	3	–	0	4	–	5	–	0
Emporia State	2	–	3	–	0	3	–	5	–	1
St. Benedict's	0	–	5	–	0	0	–	7	–	1
$ – Conference champion

1962 College Athletic Conference football standings
	Conf.					Overall
Team	W		L		T	W		L		T
Washington and Lee $	3	–	0	–	0	8	–	1	–	0
Sewanee	2	–	1	–	0	4	–	3	–	1
Southwestern (TN)	1	–	2	–	0	4	–	4	–	0
Centre	0	–	3	–	0	1	–	6	–	1
Washington University	0	–	0	–	0	5	–	3	–	0
$ – Conference champion

1962 College Conference of Illinois football standings
	Conf.					Overall
Team	W		L		T	W		L		T
Carthage $	7	–	0	–	0	8	–	0	–	0
Carroll (WI)	5	–	2	–	0	6	–	2	–	0
Augustana (IL)	4	–	3	–	0	5	–	4	–	0
Millikin	4	–	3	–	0	4	–	4	–	0
Illinois Wesleyan	4	–	3	–	0	4	–	5	–	0
North Central (IL)	3	–	4	–	0	4	–	5	–	0
North Park	1	–	6	–	0	2	–	6	–	0
Lake Forest	0	–	7	–	0	0	–	7	–	0
$ – Conference champion

1962 Far Western Conference football standings
	Conf.					Overall
Team	W		L		T	W		L		T
San Francisco State $	3	–	1	–	1	6	–	2	–	1
Humboldt State	3	–	2	–	0	7	–	2	–	0
Nevada	2	–	2	–	1	5	–	3	–	1
UC Davis	2	–	3	–	0	5	–	4	–	0
Chico State	2	–	3	–	0	4	–	4	–	1
Sacramento State	2	–	3	–	0	2	–	7	–	0
$ – Conference champion

1962 Gulf States Conference football standings
	Conf.					Overall
Team	W		L		T	W		L		T
Northwestern State $	4	–	1	–	0	7	–	2	–	1
McNeese State	3	–	2	–	0	6	–	2	–	1
Southeastern Louisiana	3	–	2	–	0	6	–	3	–	0
Louisiana Tech	2	–	3	–	0	4	–	4	–	0
Southwestern Louisiana	2	–	3	–	0	4	–	5	–	1
Northeast Louisiana State	1	–	4	–	0	2	–	6	–	0
$ – Conference champion

1962 Hoosier Conference football standings
	Conf.					Overall
Team	W		L		T	W		L		T
Taylor $	5	–	0	–	0	6	–	3	–	0
Anderson (IN)	3	–	1	–	1	5	–	2	–	1
Franklin (IN)	2	–	1	–	2	3	–	4	–	2
Manchester (IN)	2	–	3	–	0	2	–	6	–	0
Indiana Central	1	–	3	–	1	1	–	6	–	2
Hanover	0	–	5	–	0	0	–	9	–	0
$ – Conference champion

1962 Indiana Collegiate Conference football standings
	Conf.					Overall
Team	W		L		T	W		L		T
Butler $	4	–	1	–	1	5	–	2	–	2
Valparaiso	4	–	2	–	0	6	–	3	–	0
Indiana State	4	–	2	–	0	5	–	3	–	0
DePauw	3	–	3	–	0	5	–	4	–	0
Saint Joseph's (IN)	3	–	3	–	0	4	–	4	–	1
Ball State	2	–	3	–	1	4	–	3	–	1
Evansville	0	–	6	–	0	0	–	9	–	0
$ – Conference champion

1962 Interstate Intercollegiate Athletic Conference football standings
	Conf.					Overall
Team	W		L		T	W		L		T
Central Michigan $	4	–	0	–	0	6	–	4	–	0
No. 9 Northern Illinois	3	–	1	–	0	8	–	2	–	0
Western Illinois	2	–	2	–	0	5	–	3	–	0
Illinois State Normal	1	–	3	–	0	5	–	4	–	0
Eastern Illinois	0	–	4	–	0	1	–	7	–	0
$ – Conference champion; Rankings from NAIA poll

1962 Iowa Conference football standings
	Conf.					Overall
Team	W		L		T	W		L		T
No. 10 Parsons $	9	–	0	–	0	9	–	0	–	0
Central (IA)	7	–	2	–	0	7	–	2	–	0
Luther	6	–	2	–	1	6	–	2	–	1
Upper Iowa	6	–	3	–	0	6	–	3	–	0
William Penn	5	–	3	–	1	5	–	3	–	1
Wartburg	5	–	4	–	0	5	–	4	–	0
Buena Vista	3	–	6	–	0	3	–	6	–	0
Dubuque	2	–	7	–	0	2	–	7	–	0
Iowa Wesleyan	1	–	8	–	0	1	–	8	–	0
Simpson (IA)	0	–	9	–	0	0	–	9	–	0
$ – Conference champion; Rankings from NAIA poll

1962 Lone Star Conference football standings
	Conf.					Overall
Team	W		L		T	W		L		T
No. 4 Texas A&I $	6	–	0	–	1	9	–	0	–	1
Southwest Texas State	6	–	1	–	0	8	–	2	–	0
Sam Houston State	4	–	2	–	1	5	–	3	–	1
Lamar Tech	4	–	3	–	0	7	–	3	–	0
East Texas State	3	–	3	–	1	5	–	4	–	1
Sul Ross	2	–	5	–	0	4	–	6	–	0
Stephen F. Austin	1	–	6	–	0	1	–	9	–	0
Howard Payne	0	–	6	–	1	1	–	8	–	1
$ – Conference champion; Rankings from NAIA poll

1962 Mason–Dixon Conference football standings
	Conf.					Overall
Team	W		L		T	W		L		T
Western Maryland $	4	–	0	–	0	8	–	1	–	0
Hampden–Sydney	3	–	1	–	0	6	–	4	–	0
Bridgewater	2	–	2	–	0	3	–	3	–	0
Gallaudet	0	–	1	–	0	1	–	6	–	0
Johns Hopkins	0	–	2	–	0	2	–	6	–	0
Randolph–Macon	0	–	3	–	0	2	–	6	–	0
$ – Conference champion

1962 Michigan Intercollegiate Athletic Association football standings
	Conf.					Overall
Team	W		L		T	W		L		T
Kalamazoo $	5	–	0	–	0	8	–	0	–	0
Albion	3	–	2	–	0	6	–	2	–	0
Olivet	3	–	2	–	0	6	–	3	–	0
Adrian	3	–	2	–	0	3	–	4	–	0
Hope	1	–	4	–	0	3	–	6	–	0
Alma	0	–	5	–	0	0	–	8	–	0
$ – Conference champion

1962 Mid-Ohio Conference football standings
	Conf.					Overall
Team	W		L		T	W		L		T
Bluffton +	2	–	1	–	0	5	–	3	–	0
Defiance +	2	–	1	–	0	5	–	3	–	0
Ashland +	2	–	1	–	0	4	–	4	–	1
Wilmington (OH)	0	–	3	–	0	2	–	6	–	0
+ – Conference co-champions

1962 Middle Atlantic Conference football standings
	Conf.					Overall
Team	W		L		T	W		L		T
University Division
Delaware x	5	–	0	–	0	7	–	2	–	0
Bucknell	5	–	1	–	0	6	–	3	–	0
Lehigh	2	–	2	–	0	3	–	6	–	0
Temple	2	–	3	–	0	3	–	6	–	0
Lafayette	2	–	4	–	0	3	–	5	–	0
Gettysburg	2	–	4	–	0	2	–	6	–	0
Muhlenberg	0	–	4	–	0	2	–	7	–	0
Northern College Division
Susquehanna x	5	–	0	–	0	9	–	0	–	0
Moravian	4	–	2	–	0	5	–	3	–	0
Wagner	3	–	3	–	0	4	–	4	–	1
Wilkes	3	–	4	–	0	3	–	4	–	0
Upsala	2	–	3	–	0	4	–	4	–	0
Albright	2	–	3	–	0	3	–	5	–	0
Lycoming	1	–	4	–	0	4	–	4	–	0
Hofstra *	1	–	0	–	0	8	–	2	–	0
Juniata *	2	–	1	–	0	6	–	2	–	0
Southern College Division
Western Maryland x	5	–	1	–	0	8	–	1	–	0
Drexel x	5	–	1	–	0	6	–	2	–	0
Swarthmore	4	–	2	–	0	5	–	2	–	0
Lebanon Valley	4	–	2	–	0	5	–	3	–	0
Pennsylvania Military	5	–	4	–	0	5	–	5	–	0
Dickinson	3	–	5	–	0	3	–	5	–	0
Johns Hopkins	2	–	4	–	0	2	–	6	–	0
Ursinus	2	–	5	–	0	2	–	5	–	0
Haverford	1	–	5	–	0	1	–	6	–	0
Franklin & Marshall	0	–	5	–	0	0	–	8	–	0
West Chester *	0	–	0	–	0	7	–	2	–	0
x – Division champion/co-champions; * – Ineligible for championship due to insufficient conference games

1962 Midwest Athletic Association football standings
	Conf.					Overall
Team	W		L		T	W		L		T
No. 16 Lincoln (MO) $	2	–	0	–	1	5	–	3	–	1
Central State (OH)	2	–	1	–	0	3	–	3	–	1
Tennessee A&I	1	–	1	–	1	1	–	7	–	1
Kentucky State	0	–	3	–	0	4	–	4	–	0
$ – Conference champion; Rankings from Pittsburgh Courier

1962 Midwest Conference football standings
	Conf.					Overall
Team	W		L		T	W		L		T
Grinnell $	7	–	0	–	1	7	–	0	–	1
Ripon	6	–	1	–	1	6	–	1	–	1
Lawrence	6	–	2	–	0	6	–	2	–	0
Coe	5	–	2	–	1	5	–	2	–	1
St. Olaf	5	–	2	–	1	5	–	2	–	1
Carleton	4	–	4	–	0	4	–	4	–	0
Cornell (IA)	2	–	6	–	0	2	–	6	–	0
Monmouth (IL)	2	–	6	–	0	2	–	6	–	0
Beloit	1	–	7	–	0	1	–	7	–	0
Knox	0	–	8	–	0	0	–	8	–	0
$ – Conference champion

1962 Minnesota Intercollegiate Athletic Conference football standings
	Conf.					Overall
Team	W		L		T	W		L		T
No. 7 Saint John's (MN) $	7	–	0	–	0	9	–	0	–	0
Minnesota–Duluth	5	–	1	–	1	6	–	2	–	1
St. Thomas (MN)	5	–	2	–	0	6	–	3	–	0
Concordia (MN)	3	–	3	–	1	5	–	3	–	1
Macalester	3	–	4	–	0	3	–	5	–	0
Augsburg	2	–	5	–	0	3	–	5	–	0
Gustavus Adolphus	2	–	5	–	0	2	–	6	–	0
Hamline	0	–	7	–	0	2	–	7	–	0
$ – Conference champion; Rankings from NAIA poll

1962 Missouri Intercollegiate Athletic Association football standings
	Conf.					Overall
Team	W		L		T	W		L		T
SE Missouri State $	5	–	0	–	0	7	–	3	–	0
NE Missouri State	4	–	1	–	0	7	–	2	–	0
SW Missouri State	3	–	2	–	0	5	–	3	–	1
Central Missouri State	2	–	3	–	0	2	–	6	–	1
Missouri–Rolla	1	–	4	–	0	2	–	7	–	0
NW Missouri State	0	–	5	–	0	0	–	9	–	0
$ – Conference champion

1962 North Central Conference football standings
	Conf.					Overall
Team	W		L		T	W		L		T
State College of Iowa +	5	–	0	–	1	7	–	1	–	1
South Dakota State +	5	–	0	–	1	7	–	2	–	1
Augustana (SD)	4	–	2	–	0	6	–	3	–	0
North Dakota	3	–	3	–	0	5	–	4	–	0
Morningside	2	–	4	–	0	2	–	7	–	0
South Dakota	1	–	5	–	0	1	–	9	–	0
North Dakota State	0	–	6	–	0	0	–	10	–	0
+ – Conference co-champions

1962 Northern State College Conference football standings
	Conf.					Overall
Team	W		L		T	W		L		T
Winona State $	5	–	0	–	0	6	–	1	–	1
Mankato State	3	–	2	–	0	4	–	4	–	0
St. Cloud State	2	–	2	–	1	5	–	3	–	1
Moorhead State	2	–	3	–	0	5	–	4	–	0
Bemidji State	2	–	3	–	0	3	–	6	–	0
Michigan Tech	0	–	4	–	1	0	–	6	–	1
$ – Conference champion

1962 Ohio Athletic Conference football standings
	Conf.					Overall
Team	W		L		T	W		L		T
No. 2 Wittenberg $	6	–	0	–	0	9	–	0	–	0
Akron	7	–	1	–	0	7	–	2	–	0
Denison	5	–	1	–	0	7	–	1	–	1
Muskingum	6	–	2	–	0	7	–	2	–	0
Baldwin–Wallace	3	–	1	–	0	6	–	2	–	0
Hiram	4	–	2	–	0	5	–	3	–	0
Otterbein	4	–	3	–	0	5	–	3	–	0
Capital	4	–	4	–	0	4	–	4	–	0
Wooster	3	–	4	–	0	4	–	4	–	1
Mount Union	2	–	5	–	0	3	–	6	–	0
Heidelberg	2	–	5	–	0	2	–	7	–	0
Oberlin	1	–	5	–	0	1	–	6	–	0
Marietta	1	–	5	–	0	1	–	8	–	0
Ohio Wesleyan	1	–	6	–	0	3	–	6	–	0
Kenyon	1	–	6	–	0	2	–	6	–	0
$ – Conference champion; Rankings from AP small college poll

1962 Ohio Valley Conference football standings
	Conf.					Overall
Team	W		L		T	W		L		T
East Tennessee State +	4	–	2	–	0	7	–	3	–	0
Eastern Kentucky +	4	–	2	–	0	6	–	3	–	0
Morehead State +	4	–	2	–	0	5	–	3	–	0
Middle Tennessee +	4	–	2	–	0	6	–	4	–	0
Western Kentucky	3	–	3	–	0	5	–	3	–	0
Murray State	1	–	5	–	0	5	–	5	–	0
Tennessee Tech	1	–	5	–	0	2	–	8	–	0
+ – Conference co-champions

1962 Pennsylvania State College Conference football standings
	Conf.					Overall
Team	W		L		T	W		L		T
East Division
East Stroudsburg xy	6	–	0	–	0	8	–	1	–	0
West Chester	5	–	1	–	0	7	–	2	–	0
Kutztown	3	–	3	–	0	5	–	3	–	0
Bloomsburg	3	–	3	–	0	4	–	4	–	1
Mansfield	2	–	4	–	0	2	–	5	–	0
Millersville	2	–	4	–	0	2	–	6	–	0
Cheyney	0	–	6	–	0	1	–	6	–	0
West Division
Slippery Rock xy$	5	–	1	–	0	9	–	1	–	0
California (PA)	4	–	1	–	1	5	–	1	–	1
Indiana (PA)	4	–	1	–	1	5	–	2	–	1
Shippensburg	3	–	3	–	0	4	–	4	–	0
Clarion	3	–	3	–	0	4	–	4	–	0
Edinboro	1	–	5	–	0	3	–	5	–	0
Lock Haven	0	–	6	–	0	2	–	6	–	0
Championship: Slippery Rock 13, East Stroudsburg 6
$ – Conference champion; x – Division champion/co-champions; y – Championship game participant

1962 Presidents' Athletic Conference football standings
	Conf.					Overall
Team	W		L		T	W		L		T
John Carroll $	7	–	0	–	0	7	–	0	–	0
Bethany (WV)	6	–	1	–	0	6	–	1	–	0
Western Reserve	3	–	2	–	1	3	–	3	–	1
Washington & Jefferson	3	–	3	–	0	4	–	3	–	0
Allegheny	2	–	3	–	0	2	–	5	–	0
Thiel	2	–	5	–	0	2	–	5	–	0
Case Tech	1	–	6	–	0	1	–	6	–	0
Wayne State (MI)	0	–	4	–	1	0	–	6	–	1
$ – Conference champion

1962 Rocky Mountain Conference football standings
	Conf.					Overall
Team	W		L		T	W		L		T
Adams State $	4	–	0	–	0	9	–	1	–	0
Western State (CO)	2	–	2	–	0	5	–	4	–	0
Colorado State–Greeley	2	–	2	–	0	3	–	6	–	0
Colorado Mines	1	–	3	–	0	4	–	5	–	0
Colorado College	0	–	4	–	0	1	–	7	–	1
$ – Conference champion

1962 Southern California Intercollegiate Athletic Conference football standings
	Conf.					Overall
Team	W		L		T	W		L		T
Whittier $	3	–	0	–	0	8	–	1	–	0
Redlands	3	–	1	–	0	5	–	5	–	0
Claremont-Mudd	2	–	2	–	0	4	–	5	–	0
Occidental	2	–	3	–	0	6	–	3	–	0
Pomona	2	–	3	–	0	4	–	5	–	0
Caltech	0	–	3	–	0	1	–	6	–	0
$ – Conference champion

1962 Southern Intercollegiate Athletic Conference football standings
	Conf.					Overall
Team	W		L		T	W		L		T
No. 2 Florida A&M +	6	–	0	–	0	9	–	1	–	0
Alabama A&M +	6	–	0	–	0	8	–	2	–	0
Morehouse	5	–	1	–	0	6	–	2	–	0
Clark (GA)	5	–	1	–	0	6	–	1	–	0
Bethune–Cookman	6	–	2	–	0	7	–	2	–	0
Fisk	4	–	2	–	0	6	–	2	–	0
South Carolina State	4	–	3	–	0	5	–	3	–	0
Benedict	3	–	3	–	0	5	–	5	–	0
Tuskegee	4	–	4	–	0	4	–	4	–	0
Morris Brown	2	–	4	–	0	4	–	5	–	0
Lane	2	–	6	–	0	2	–	7	–	0
Allen	1	–	4	–	0	3	–	6	–	0
Fort Valley State	0	–	5	–	0	2	–	7	–	0
Alabama State	0	–	6	–	0	0	–	8	–	0
Knoxville	0	–	6	–	0	0	–	8	–	0
+ – Conference co-champions; Rankings from NAIA poll

1962 Southwestern Athletic Conference football standings
	Conf.					Overall
Team	W		L		T	W		L		T
Jackson State $	6	–	1	–	0	10	–	1	–	0
Texas Southern	5	–	2	–	0	7	–	3	–	0
Grambling	3	–	2	–	2	6	–	2	–	2
Prairie View A&M	4	–	3	–	0	6	–	3	–	0
Southern	3	–	4	–	0	5	–	5	–	0
Arkansas AM&N	2	–	4	–	1	4	–	5	–	1
Alcorn A&M	2	–	5	–	0	4	–	5	–	0
Wiley	1	–	5	–	1	3	–	5	–	1
$ – Conference champion

1962 Virginia Little Eight Conference football standings
	Conf.					Overall
Team	W		L		T	W		L		T
Emory and Henry *	1	–	0	–	0	8	–	0	–	1
Hampden–Sydney $	2	–	1	–	0	6	–	4	–	0
Bridgewater	1	–	1	–	0	3	–	3	–	0
Randolph–Macon	0	–	2	–	0	2	–	6	–	0
$ – Conference champion; * – Emory and Henry did not play enough conference games to be eligible for the championship.

1962 West Penn Conference football standings
	Conf.					Overall
Team	W		L		T	W		L		T
Westminster (PA) $	5	–	0	–	0	6	–	2	–	0
Waynesburg	3	–	1	–	0	5	–	3	–	0
Grove City	2	–	1	–	0	6	–	3	–	0
Geneva	1	–	3	–	0	1	–	5	–	1
Saint Vincent	1	–	3	–	0	1	–	6	–	0
Carnegie Tech	0	–	4	–	0	1	–	7	–	0
$ – Conference champion

1962 Wisconsin State College Conference football standings
	Conf.					Overall
Team	W		L		T	W		L		T
Whitewater State $	6	–	1	–	0	6	–	3	–	0
Superior State	4	–	1	–	1	7	–	1	–	1
Stevens Point State	5	–	2	–	0	6	–	2	–	0
Eau Claire State	5	–	2	–	0	5	–	3	–	0
La Crosse State	4	–	3	–	0	4	–	5	–	0
River Falls State	3	–	4	–	0	3	–	5	–	1
Milwaukee	2	–	4	–	0	2	–	6	–	0
Platteville State	2	–	4	–	0	2	–	6	–	0
Stout State	1	–	4	–	1	2	–	5	–	1
Oshkosh State	0	–	7	–	0	0	–	7	–	0
$ – Conference champion

1962 Yankee Conference football standings
	Conf.					Overall
Team	W		L		T	W		L		T
New Hampshire $	4	–	0	–	1	7	–	0	–	1
UMass	4	–	1	–	0	6	–	3	–	0
Connecticut	2	–	2	–	0	3	–	6	–	0
Rhode Island	1	–	3	–	1	2	–	5	–	2
Vermont	1	–	3	–	0	3	–	5	–	0
Maine	1	–	4	–	0	4	–	4	–	0
$ – Conference champion

1962 NCAA College Division independents football records
	Conf.			Overall
Team	W	L	T	W		L		T
Cal Poly Pomona		–		9	–	1	–	0
Southern Miss		–		9	–	1	–	0
Drake		–		8	–	2	–	0
Howard (AL)		–		7	–	2	–	0
Southern Connecticut State		–		7	–	2	–	0
St. Norbert		–		7	–	2	–	0
Hawaii		–		6	–	2	–	0
Montana State		–		7	–	3	–	0
Arkansas State		–		6	–	3	–	0
Northern Michigan		–		6	–	3	–	0
Northeastern		–		5	–	3	–	0
Wabash		–		5	–	3	–	1
Abilene Christian		–		6	–	4	–	0
East Carolina		–		5	–	4	–	0
Weber State		–		5	–	4	–	0
Wheaton (IL)		–		5	–	4	–	0
Chattanooga		–		5	–	5	–	0
Arlington State		–		4	–	6	–	0
Southern Illinois		–		4	–	6	–	0
Findlay		–		4	–	5	–	0
Tampa		–		3	–	4	–	2
UC Riverside		–		3	–	5	–	0
Idaho State		–		3	–	6	–	0
Eastern Michigan		–		2	–	5	–	0
Mississippi Vocational		–		2	–	5	–	0
Santa Clara		–		2	–	6	–	0
Carnegie Tech		–		1	–	7	–	0
Rose Poly		–		1	–	7	–	0
Union (NY)		–		1	–	7	–	0
Trinity (TX)		–		1	–	8	–	0

== Rankings ==
=== Small college poll ===
In 1962, both United Press International (UPI) and the Associated Press (AP) conducted "small college" polls, and selected different number one teams. UPI's panel of coaches selected Southern Miss, who had a record of 9–1 with their sole defeat coming in an 8–6 loss to Memphis State. The AP's panel of sportswriters selected Florida A&M, who had a 9–0 record including four shutouts. The Rattlers went on to play Jackson State in the Orange Blossom Classic, but lost 22–6.

United Press International (coaches) final poll
Published on November 29

Rank	School	Record	No. 1 votes	Total points
1	Southern Miss	9–1	19	286
2	Florida A&M	9–0	7	273
3	Central Oklahoma	9–0	3	233
4	Lenoir–Rhyne	10–0		204
5	Wittenberg	9–0	2	126
6	Northern Illinois	8–2		105
7	Fresno State	7–3		104
8	Texas A&I	9–0–1		102
9	Delaware	7–2		94
10	Montana State	7–3		54

Associated Press (writers) final poll
Published on November 30

Rank	School	Record	No. 1 votes	Total points
1	Florida A&M	9–0	2	67
2	Wittenberg	9–0	1	66
3	Central Oklahoma	9–0	2	54
4	Southern Miss	9–1	1	44
5	Lenoir–Rhyne	10–0		34
6	Texas A&I	9–0–1	1	33
7	Northern Illinois	9–1†		27
8	Fresno State	7–3		19
9	Saint John's (MN)	9–0		15
10	Southeastern Louisiana	6–3		13

† Northern Illinois had an 8–2 record when the poll was taken.

== See also ==
- 1962 NCAA University Division football season
- 1962 NAIA football season
