= Bob Mattos =

American football player and coach (1941–2010)

Biographical details
- Born: September 28, 1941; Ceres, California, U.S.
- Died: March 14, 2010 (aged 68); Rancho Murieta, California, U.S.

Playing career
- 1962–1963: Sacramento State

Coaching career (HC unless noted)
- 1971–1977: Stagg HS (CA)
- 1978–1992: Sacramento State

Head coaching record
- Overall: 84–73–2 (college)
- Tournaments: 2–1 (NCAA D-II playoffs)

Accomplishments and honors

Championships
- 2 WFC (1986)

Robert J. Mattos (September 28, 1941 – March 14, 2010) was an American football coach. He served as the head football coach at California State University, Sacramento from 1978 to 1992, compiling a record of 84–73–2. He is the only coach in the school's history to have a winning record. Prior to coaching at Sacramento State, Mattos was the head football coach at Stagg High School in Stockton, California. Mattos died of brain cancer March 14, 2010, at his home in Rancho Murieta, California.

== Head coaching record ==
=== College ===
Year	Team	Overall	Conference	Standing	Bowl/playoffs
Sacramento State Hornets (Far Western Conference / Northern California Athletic Conference) (1978–1984)
1978	Sacramento State	1–9	1–4	5th	
1979	Sacramento State	4–6	2–3	T–3rd	
1980	Sacramento State	3–7	1–4	T–5th	
1981	Sacramento State	5–6	1–4	5th	
1982	Sacramento State	8–3	3–2	T–2nd	
1983	Sacramento State	5–5–1	4–1–1	2nd	
1984	Sacramento State	6–5	5–1	2nd	
Sacramento State Hornets (Western Football Conference) (1985–1992)
1985	Sacramento State	8–3	4–1	2nd	
1986	Sacramento State	6–4–1	5–1	1st	
1987	Sacramento State	4–7	2–4	T–5th	
1988	Sacramento State	10–3	4–2	T–2nd	L NCAA Division II Seminal
1989	Sacramento State	5–4	3–2	T–5th	
1990	Sacramento State	4–6	1–4	6th	
1991	Sacramento State	8–2	3–2	3rd	
1992	Sacramento State	7–3	3–2	T–2nd	
Sacramento State:		84–73–2	38–38–3		
Total:		84–73–2			
National championship Conference title Conference division title or championship game berth
