= Bud Van Deren =

American football player and coach (1924–2010)

Biographical details
- Born: November 22, 1924; Boston, Massachusetts, U.S.
- Died: September 9, 2010 (aged 85); Eureka, California, U.S.

Playing career

Football
- 1946: Santa Rosa
- 1947–1948: California
- Position: End

Coaching career (HC unless noted)

Football
- 1950–1953: Santa Rosa (ends)
- 1954–1955: Oakdale HS (CA)
- 1956–1961: Yuba
- 1962–1963: Humboldt State (line)
- 1964–1965: California (assistant)
- 1966–1985: Humboldt State

Basketball
- 1950–1953: Santa Rosa (assistant)

Track
- 1950–1953: Santa Rosa (assistant)

Tennis
- 1953–1954: Santa Rosa

Head coaching record
- Overall: 98–101–4 (college football)
- Bowls: 1–0 (college); 1–0 (junior college)

Accomplishments and honors

Championships
- Football; 4 GVC (1956–1959); 1 FWC (1968)

Awards
- First-team All-PCC (1948); Second-team All-PCC (1947)

Frank P. "Bud" Van Deren (November 22, 1924 – September 9, 2010) was an American football player and coach. He served as the head football coach at Humboldt State University from 1966 to 1985, compiling a record of 98–101–4. Van Deren was the head football coach at Yuba College in Marysville, California from 1956 to 1961. He began his coaching career in 1950 as an assistant football coach at Santa Rosa Junior College in Santa Rosa, California, where he also coached basketball, track, and tennis.

Van Deren died on September 9, 2010, in Eureka, California.

== Head coaching record ==
=== College football ===
Year	Team	Overall	Conference	Standing	Bowl/playoffs	AP^{#}	UPI^{°}
Humboldt State Lumberjacks (Far Western Conference / Northern California Athletic Conference) (1966–1985)
1966	Humboldt State	4–6	2–4	5th			
1967	Humboldt State	6–3–1	3–2–1	3rd			
1968	Humboldt State	10–1	6–0	1st	W Camellia	16	10
1969	Humboldt State	6–4	2–3	4th			
1970	Humboldt State	5–5	2–2	T–3rd			
1971	Humboldt State	7–4	3–3	4th			
1972	Humboldt State	7–3	4–1	2nd			
1973	Humboldt State	2–6–2	1–4	5th			
1974	Humboldt State	4–6	2–3	T–2nd			
1975	Humboldt State	7–3	4–1	2nd			
1976	Humboldt State	5–5	4–1	2nd			
1977	Humboldt State	5–4–1	1–3–1	5th			
1978	Humboldt State	5–6	3–2	3rd			
1979	Humboldt State	8–2	4–1	2nd			
1980	Humboldt State	2–8	1–4	T–5th			
1981	Humboldt State	6–4	3–2	T–3rd			
1982	Humboldt State	3–7	1–4	T–5th			
1983	Humboldt State	4–6	3–3	T–4th			
1984	Humboldt State	0–10	0–6	7th			
1985	Humboldt State	2–8	1–4	T–5th			
Humboldt State:		98–101–4	50–53–2				
Total:		98–101–4					
National championship Conference title Conference division title or championship game berth
^{#}Rankings from final AP College Division poll.; ^{°}Rankings from final UPI College Division poll.

=== Junior college football ===
Year	Team	Overall	Conference	Standing	Bowl/playoffs
Yuba 49ers (Golden Valley Conference) (1956–1961)
1956	Yuba	6–2	4–1	T–1st	
1957	Yuba	6–2	4–0	1st	
1958	Yuba	8–2	5–0	1st	W Lumber Bowl
1959	Yuba		4–0–1	T–1st	
1960	Yuba	4–5	3–2	T–2nd	
1961	Yuba		2–2–1	T–3rd	
Yuba:			22–5–2		
Total:					
National championship Conference title Conference division title or championship game berth
