= Willard Bailey =

American football coach and college athletics administrator

Biographical details
- Born: June 3, 1939 (age 87); Suffolk, Virginia, U.S.

Coaching career (HC unless noted)
- 1966–1970: Virginia Union (assistant)
- 1971–1983: Virginia Union
- 1984–1992: Norfolk State
- 1995–2003: Virginia Union
- 2005–2010: Saint Paul's (VA)
- 2011–2013: Virginia–Lynchburg

Administrative career (AD unless noted)
- 1984–1989: Norfolk State

Head coaching record
- Overall: 238–169–7
- Tournaments: 0–6 (NCAA D-II playoffs)

Accomplishments and honors

Championships
- 7 CIAA (1973, 1979, 1981–1984, 2001)

Awards
- Black College Football Hall of Fame (2021)

Willard Bailey (born June 3, 1939) is an American college administrator and former college football coach. He served as head football coach at Virginia Union University from 1971 to 1983 and again from 1995 to 2003, Norfolk State University from 1984 to 1992, Saint Paul's College in Lawrenceville, Virginia from 2005 to 2010, and Virginia University of Lynchburg from 2011 to 2013, compiling a career college football head coaching record of 238–169–7. As a coach in the Central Intercollegiate Athletic Association (CIAA), Bailey won seven conference championships, six with Virginia Union and one with Norfolk State. His Virginia Union Panther football teams made five straight appearances in the NCAA Division II football playoffs, from 1979 to 1983, while his Norfolk State Spartan football team made one appearance in the NCAA Division II football playoffs, in 1984.

These are players from Bailey's Virginia Union Panther, Norfolk State Spartan, and Saint Paul's Tiger teams who went on to the National Football League/Canadian League/Arena League:

- Virginia Union: Herbert Scott, Malcolm Barnwell, Carl Bland, Pete Hunter, James Atkins.
- Norfolk State: Willie Gillus, A. J. Jimerson
- Saint Paul's: Greg Toler (the first player from the school to be drafted by the National Football League)

Bailey graduated from Norfolk State in 1962.

Bailey has the most wins of any football coach in the history of the CIAA. In 2021, he was inducted into the Black College Football Hall of Fame. He is the president of Central International College, a religious-based school that opened in 2020, in Chester, Virginia.

== Head coaching record ==
Year	Team	Overall	Conference	Standing	Bowl/playoffs
Virginia Union Panthers (Central Intercollegiate Athletic Association) (1971–1983)
1971	Virginia Union	4–3–2	4–3–1	3rd (Northern)	
1972	Virginia Union	6–3	3–2	T–2nd (Northern)	
1973	Virginia Union	9–1	9–0	1st	
1974	Virginia Union	8–2	7–1	2nd	
1975	Virginia Union	7–4	6–1	T–2nd	
1976	Virginia Union	7–4	5–3	T–3rd	
1977	Virginia Union	10–1	7–1	2nd	
1978	Virginia Union	7–4–1	5–2–1	T–2nd	
1979	Virginia Union	10–2	8–0	1st	L NCAA Division II First Round
1980	Virginia Union	9–2–1	5–1–1	2nd	L NCAA Division II First Round
1981	Virginia Union	11–1	7–0	1st (Northern)	L NCAA Division II First Round
1982	Virginia Union	8–3	6–1	1st (Northern)	L NCAA Division II First Round
1983	Virginia Union	9–2	6–1	1st (Northern)	L NCAA Division II First Round
Norfolk State Spartans (Central Intercollegiate Athletic Association) (1984–1992)
1984	Norfolk State	10–2	6–1	1st (Northern)	L NCAA Division II First Round
1985	Norfolk State	6–4	5–2	2nd (Northern)	
1986	Norfolk State	4–6	3–4	4th (Northern)	
1987	Norfolk State	4–7	2–5	4th (Northern)	
1988	Norfolk State	5–5	2–4	4th (Northern)	
1989	Norfolk State	6–3–1	3–2–1	4th (Northern)	
1990	Norfolk State	7–3	5–1	2nd (Northern)	
1991	Norfolk State	7–3	6–1	T–2nd	
1992	Norfolk State	3–7	2–4	T–8th	
Norfolk State:		52–40–1	34–24–1		
Virginia Union Panthers (Central Intercollegiate Athletic Association) (1995–2003)
1995	Virginia Union	0–8–2	0–6–2	9th	
1996	Virginia Union	2–8	1–7	T–9th	
1997	Virginia Union	6–5	3–4		
1998	Virginia Union	8–3	4–3	T–3rd	
1999	Virginia Union	8–2	6–1	2nd	
2000	Virginia Union	8–3	5–1	1st (Eastern)	
2001	Virginia Union	8–3	5–1	1st (Eastern)	
2002	Virginia Union	6–4	4–3	3rd (Eastern)	
2003	Virginia Union	6–5	5–2	T–1st (Eastern)	
Virginia Union:		157–73–6	111–44–5		
Saint Paul's Tigers (Central Intercollegiate Athletic Association) (2005–2010)
2005	Saint Paul's	4–6	3–4	4th (Northern)	
2006	Saint Paul's	1–8	1–6	6th (Northern)	
2007	Saint Paul's	5–5	4–3	3rd (Northern)	
2008	Saint Paul's	5–5	3–4	T–4th (Northern)	
2009	Saint Paul's	4–5	3–4	5th (Northern)	
2010	Saint Paul's	2–8	2–5	6th (Northern)	
Saint Paul's:		21–37	16–26		
Virginia–Lynchburg Dragons (Independent) (2011–2013)
2011	Virginia–Lynchburg	4–6			
2012	Virginia–Lynchburg	2–8			
2013	Virginia–Lynchburg	2–5			
Virginia–Lynchburg:		8–19			
Total:		238–169–7			
National championship Conference title Conference division title or championship game berth

== See also ==
- List of college football career coaching wins leaders
