= 1984 Sacramento State Hornets football team =

American college football season

1984 Sacramento State Hornets football
- Conference: Northern California Athletic Conference
- Record: 6–5 (5–1 NCAC)
- Head coach: Bob Mattos (7th season)
- Home stadium: Hornet Stadium

1984 Northern California Athletic Conference football standings
	Conf.					Overall
Team	W		L		T	W		L		T
No. T–6 UC Davis $^	6	–	0	–	0	9	–	2	–	0
Sacramento State	5	–	1	–	0	6	–	5	–	0
Cal State Hayward	4	–	2	–	0	7	–	3	–	0
Chico State	2	–	3	–	1	4	–	5	–	1
Sonoma State	2	–	4	–	0	2	–	8	–	0
San Francisco State	1	–	4	–	1	1	–	8	–	1
Humboldt State	0	–	6	–	0	0	–	10	–	0
$ – Conference champion; ^ – NCAA Division II playoff participant; San Francisco State forfeited 3 wins including 1 conference win over Sonoma State.; Rankings from NCAA Division II Football Committee poll

The 1984 Sacramento State Hornets football team represented California State University, Sacramento as a member of the Northern California Athletic Conference (NCAC) during the 1984 NCAA Division II football season. Led by seventh-year head coach Bob Mattos, Sacramento State compiled an overall record of 6–5 with a mark of 5–1 in conference play, placing second in the NCAC. The team outscored its opponents 277 to 218 for the season. The Hornets played home games at Hornet Stadium in Sacramento, California.

This was the last year that Sacramento State played in the NCAC. In 1985, the team moved to the Western Football Conference (WFC).

== Schedule ==
Date	Opponent	Site	Result	Attendance	Source
September 8	at Cal Poly*	Mustang Stadium; San Luis Obispo, CA	L 6–27	1,874	
September 15	Cal State Northridge*	Devonshire Downs; Northridge, CA	L 13–24	2,244	
September 22	Saint Mary's*	Hornet Stadium; Sacramento, CA	W 34–9	6,754	
September 29	at No. 6 Santa Clara*	Buck Shaw Stadium; Santa Clara, CA	L 14–21	4,133	
October 6	Portland State*	Hornet Stadium; Sacramento, CA	L 21–38	5,319	
October 13	Humboldt State	Hornet Stadium; Sacramento, CA	W 52–7	2,450–4,100	
October 20	at Chico State	University Stadium; Chico, CA	W 29–15	4,621	
October 27	Sonoma State	Hornet Stadium; Sacramento, CA	W 31–12	1,108–1,850	
November 3	San Francisco State	Hornet Stadium; Sacramento, CA	W 41–14	2,790	
November 10	at Cal State Hayward	Pioneer Stadium; Hayward, CA	W 15–13	400–680	
November 17	at No. T–6 UC Davis	Toomey Field; Davis, CA (Causeway Classic)	L 21–38	8,900	
*Non-conference game; Rankings from NCAA Division II Football Committee Poll released prior to the game
