= 1984 Cal State Hayward Pioneers football team =

American college football season

1984 Cal State Hayward Pioneers football
- Conference: Northern California Athletic Conference
- Record: 7–3 (4–2 NCAC)
- Head coach: Tim Tierney (10th season)
- Home stadium: Pioneer Stadium

1984 Northern California Athletic Conference football standings
	Conf.					Overall
Team	W		L		T	W		L		T
No. T–6 UC Davis $^	6	–	0	–	0	9	–	2	–	0
Sacramento State	5	–	1	–	0	6	–	5	–	0
Cal State Hayward	4	–	2	–	0	7	–	3	–	0
Chico State	2	–	3	–	1	4	–	5	–	1
Sonoma State	2	–	4	–	0	2	–	8	–	0
San Francisco State	1	–	4	–	1	1	–	8	–	1
Humboldt State	0	–	6	–	0	0	–	10	–	0
$ – Conference champion; ^ – NCAA Division II playoff participant; San Francisco State forfeited 3 wins including 1 conference win over Sonoma State.; Rankings from NCAA Division II Football Committee poll

The 1984 Cal State Hayward Pioneers football team represented California State University, Hayward—now known as California State University, East Bay—as a member of the Northern California Athletic Conference (NCAC) during the 1984 NCAA Division II football season. Led by tenth-year head coach Tim Tierney, Cal State Hayward compiled an overall record of 7–3 with a mark of 4–2 in conference play, placing third in the NCAC. The team outscored its opponents 260 to 175 for the season. The Pioneers played home games at Pioneer Stadium in Hayward, California.

== Schedule ==
Date	Opponent	Site	Result	Attendance	Source
September 8	Saint Mary's*	Pioneer Stadium; Hayward, CA	W 31–7	1,100	
September 22	at Cal Poly*	Mustang Stadium; San Luis Obispo, CA	L 6–36	4,069	
September 29	at Cal State Northridge*	North Campus Stadium; Northridge, CA	W 38–26	1,075	
October 6	San Francisco State	Pioneer Stadium; Hayward, CA	W 43–23	800–2,000	
October 13	at No. 9 Santa Clara*	Buck Shaw Stadium; Santa Clara, CA	W 30–15	5,469	
October 20	at Sonoma State	Cossacks Stadium (Note: Seawolf Stadium was known as Cossacks Stadium until 2002 when the University changed the mascot from Cossacks to Seawolves.); Rohnert Park, CA	W 19–3	628–1,000	
October 27	No. T–9 UC Davis	Pioneer Stadium; Hayward, CA	L 12–13	8,200–8,900	
November 3	at Humboldt State	Redwood Bowl; Arcata, CA	W 27–9	500–700	
November 10	Sacramento State	Pioneer Stadium; Hayward, CA	L 13–15	400–680	
November 17	at Chico State	University Stadium; Chico, CA	W 41–28	1,250	
*Non-conference game; Rankings from NCAA Division II Football Committee Poll released prior to the game
