= 1984 Humboldt State Lumberjacks football team =

American college football season

1984 Humboldt State Lumberjacks football
- Conference: Northern California Athletic Conference
- Record: 0–10 (0–6 NCAC)
- Head coach: Bud Van Deren (19th season)
- Home stadium: Redwood Bowl

1984 Northern California Athletic Conference football standings
	Conf.					Overall
Team	W		L		T	W		L		T
No. T–6 UC Davis $^	6	–	0	–	0	9	–	2	–	0
Sacramento State	5	–	1	–	0	6	–	5	–	0
Cal State Hayward	4	–	2	–	0	7	–	3	–	0
Chico State	2	–	3	–	1	4	–	5	–	1
Sonoma State	2	–	4	–	0	2	–	8	–	0
San Francisco State	1	–	4	–	1	1	–	8	–	1
Humboldt State	0	–	6	–	0	0	–	10	–	0
$ – Conference champion; ^ – NCAA Division II playoff participant; San Francisco State forfeited 3 wins including 1 conference win over Sonoma State.; Rankings from NCAA Division II Football Committee poll

The 1984 Humboldt State Lumberjacks football team represented Humboldt State University—now known as California State Polytechnic University, Humboldt—as a member of the Northern California Athletic Conference (NCAC) during the 1984 NCAA Division II football season. Led by 19th-year head coach Bud Van Deren, the Lumberjacks compiled an overall record of 0–10 with a mark of 0–6 in conference play, placing last out of seven teams in the NCAC. The team was outscored by its opponents 312 to 84 for the season. Humboldt State played home games at the Redwood Bowl in Arcata, California.

== Schedule ==
Date	Opponent	Site	Result	Attendance	Source
September 8	at Whittier*	Memorial Stadium; Whittier, CA	L 14–28	800–2,500	
September 15	at Santa Clara*	Buck Shaw Stadium; Santa Clara, CA	L 0–38	4,732–4,792	
September 29	Portland State*	Redwood Bowl; Arcata, CA	L 7–30	2,150	
October 6	UC Davis	Redwood Bowl; Arcata, CA	L 0–46	2,200–2,475	
October 13	at Sacramento State	Hornet Stadium; Sacramento, CA	L 7–52	2,450–4,100	
October 20	at Saint Mary's*	Saint Mary's Stadium; Moraga, California	L 3–16	1,207	
October 27	Chico State	Redwood Bowl; Arcata, CA	L 10–33	1,230–1,381	
November 3	Cal State Hayward	Redwood Bowl; Arcata, CA	L 9–27	500–700	
November 10	at Sonoma State	Cossacks Stadium (Note: Seawolf Stadium was known as Cossacks Stadium until 2002 when the University changed the mascot from Cossacks to Seawolves.); Rohnert Park, CA	L 15–17	100–596	
November 17	at San Francisco State	Cox Stadium; San Francisco, CA	L 19–25	300–1,000	
*Non-conference game
