= 1984 Cal Poly Mustangs football team =

American college football season

1984 Cal Poly Mustangs football
- Conference: Western Football Conference
- Record: 6–4 (2–1 WFC)
- Head coach: Jim Sanderson (3rd season)
- Home stadium: Mustang Stadium

1984 Western Football Conference standings
	Conf.					Overall
Team	W		L		T	W		L		T
Portland State $	3	–	0	–	0	8	–	3	–	0
Cal Poly	2	–	1	–	0	6	–	4	–	0
Santa Clara	1	–	2	–	0	7	–	4	–	0
Cal State Northridge	0	–	3	–	0	3	–	7	–	0
Cal Lutheran *	0	–	0	–	0	5	–	4	–	1
$ – Conference champion; * – Ineligible for conference title

The 1984 Cal Poly Mustangs football team represented California Polytechnic State University, San Luis Obispo as a member of the Western Football Conference (WFC) during the 1984 NCAA Division II football season. Led by third-year head coach Jim Sanderson, Cal Poly compiled an overall record of 6–5 with a mark of 2–1 in conference play, placing second in the WFC. The team outscored its opponents 197 to 90 for the season. The Mustangs played home games at Mustang Stadium in San Luis Obispo, California.

== Schedule ==
Date	Opponent	Site	Result	Attendance	Source
September 8	Sacramento State*	Mustang Stadium; San Luis Obispo, CA	W 27–6	1,874	
September 15	at Fresno State*	Bulldog Stadium; Fresno, CA	L 0–14	30,991	
September 22	Cal State Hayward*	Mustang Stadium; San Luis Obispo, CA	W 36–6	4,069	
September 29	at UC Davis*	Toomey Field; Davis, CA (rivalry)	L 6–10	9,500	
October 6	at No. 5 Santa Clara	Buck Shaw Stadium; Santa Clara, CA	W 14–10	5,331	
October 13	at Portland State	Civic Stadium; Portland, OR	L 0–20	3,467	
October 20	Cal State Northridge	Mustang Stadium; San Luis Obispo, CA	W 28–0	6,970	
October 27	at Saint Mary's*	Saint Mary's Stadium; Moraga, CA	W 28–10	3,628	
November 3	Boise State*	Mustang Stadium; San Luis Obispo, CA	L 10–14	3,975	
November 17	Cal Lutheran*	Mustang Stadium; San Luis Obispo, CA	W 48–0	2,573	
*Non-conference game; Rankings from NCAA Division II Football Committee Poll released prior to the game

== Team players in the NFL ==
The following Cal Poly Mustang players were selected in the 1985 NFL draft.

Player	Position	Round	Overall	NFL team
Damone Johnson	Tight end	6	162	Los Angeles Rams
Gary Swanson	Linebacker	9	245	Los Angeles Rams
