= 1981 East Texas State Lions football team =

American college football season

1981 East Texas State Lions football
- Conference: Lone Star Conference
- Record: 7–4 (4–3 LSC)
- Head coach: Ernest Hawkins (18th season)
- Offensive scheme: Option
- Defensive coordinator: Bobby Fox (11th season)
- Base defense: 5–2
- Home stadium: Memorial Stadium

1981 Lone Star Conference football standings
	Conf.					Overall
Team	W		L		T	W		L		T
No. 4 Southwest Texas State $^	6	–	1	–	0	13	–	1	–	0
No. 9 Texas A&I	5	–	2	–	0	9	–	2	–	0
Abilene Christian	5	–	2	–	0	8	–	2	–	0
Angelo State	5	–	2	–	0	8	–	3	–	0
No. 17 East Texas State	4	–	3	–	0	7	–	4	–	0
Sam Houston State	2	–	5	–	0	3	–	7	–	0
Howard Payne	1	–	6	–	0	3	–	7	–	0
Stephen F. Austin	0	–	7	–	0	1	–	10	–	0
$ – Conference champion; ^ – NCAA Division II playoff participant; Rankings from NCAA Division II Football Committee poll for Southwest Texas State and Texas A&I and NAIA Division I poll for East Texas State

The 1981 East Texas State Lions football team represented East Texas State University—now known as Texas A&M University–Commerce—as a member of the Lone Star Conference (LSC) during the 1981 NCAA Division II football season. Led by 18th-year head coach Ernest Hawkins, the Lions compiled an overall record of 7–4 with a mark of 4–3 in conference play, placing fifth in the LSC. East Texas State played home games at Memorial Stadium in Commerce, Texas.

== Schedule ==
Date	Opponent	Site	Result	Attendance	Source
September 12	Cameron*	Memorial Stadium; Commerce, TX	W 17–13	8,000	
September 19	at Southern Arkansas*	Wilkins Stadium; Magnolia, AR	L 37–39		
September 26	Central State (OK)*	Memorial Stadium; Commerce, TX	W 31–28	8,500	
October 3	at Northwestern State*	Harry Turpin Stadium; Natchitoches, LA	W 28–21	8,000	
October 10	Sam Houston State	Memorial Stadium; Commerce, TX	W 37–14	1,200–1,800	
October 17	at Howard Payne	Yellowjacket Stadium; Brownwood, TX	W 42–0	1,500	
October 24	Abilene Christian	Memorial Stadium; Commerce, TX	L 14–19	2,500	
October 31	at No. 1 Southwest Texas State	Bobcat Stadium; San Marcos, TX	L 7–38	10,000–10,899	
November 7	No. 6 Texas A&I	Memorial Stadium; Commerce, TX	W 37–13	9,500	
November 14	Stephen F. Austin	Memorial Stadium; Commerce, TX	W 30–6	3,500	
November 21	at Angelo State	San Angelo Stadium; San Angelo, TX	L 32–44	5,005	
*Non-conference game; Rankings from NCAA Division II Football Committee Poll released prior to the game

== Postseason awards ==
=== All-Americans ===
- Cary Noiel, First Team running back

=== LSC First Team ===
- Cary Noiel, running back

=== LSC Second Team ===
- Anthony Brock, linebacker
- Frank Moore, tight end
- Peter Roos, offensive tackle
- Ted Sample, fullback
- Darren Smith, defensive back
- Randy Smith, tight end

=== LSC Honorable Mention ===
- Blake Cooper, center
- Randy Jones, punter
- Kyle Mackey, quarterback
