= 1984 Sonoma State Cossacks football team =

American college football season

1984 Sonoma State Cossacks football
- Conference: Northern California Athletic Conference
- Record: 2–8 (2–4 NCAC)
- Head coach: Tony Kehl (3rd season)
- Home stadium: Cossacks Stadium

1984 Northern California Athletic Conference football standings
	Conf.					Overall
Team	W		L		T	W		L		T
No. T–6 UC Davis $^	6	–	0	–	0	9	–	2	–	0
Sacramento State	5	–	1	–	0	6	–	5	–	0
Cal State Hayward	4	–	2	–	0	7	–	3	–	0
Chico State	2	–	3	–	1	4	–	5	–	1
Sonoma State	2	–	4	–	0	2	–	8	–	0
San Francisco State	1	–	4	–	1	1	–	8	–	1
Humboldt State	0	–	6	–	0	0	–	10	–	0
$ – Conference champion; ^ – NCAA Division II playoff participant; San Francisco State forfeited 3 wins including 1 conference win over Sonoma State.; Rankings from NCAA Division II Football Committee poll

The 1984 Sonoma State Cossacks football team represented Sonoma State University as a member of the Northern California Athletic Conference (NCAC) during the 1984 NCAA Division II football season. Led by third-year head coach Tony Kehl, Sonoma State finished the season with an overall record of 1–9 and a mark of 1–5 in conference play, placing sixth in the NCAC. The team was outscored by its opponents 288 to 126 for the season. The Cossacks played home games at Cossacks Stadium (Note: Cossacks Stadium was renamed in 2002 to Seawolf Stadium when the University changed the name of the mascot to Seawolves.) in Rohnert Park, California.

On January 1, 1985, the NCAC announced it had ruled that San Francisco State had used two ineligible players and must forfeit three victories, including one conference win over Sonoma State. With the forfeit win, the Cossacks' record improved to 2–8 overall and 2–4 in conference play, elevating them to fifth place in the NCAC.

== Schedule ==
Date	Opponent	Site	Result	Attendance	Source
September 15	at Redlands*	Redlands Stadium; Redlands, CA	L 18–34	841–1,000	
September 22	Occidental*	Cossacks Stadium; Rohnert Park, CA	L 0–7	1,267	
September 29	Saint Mary’s*	Cossacks Stadium; Rohnert Park, CA	L 9–17	810	
October 6	at Chico State	University Stadium; Chico, CA	L 10–31	1,745–2,238	
October 13	San Francisco State	Cossacks Stadium; Rohnert Park, CA	W 21–45 (forfeit win)	746–1,000	
October 20	Cal State Hayward	Cossacks Stadium; Rohnert Park, CA	L 3–19	628–1,000	
October 27	at Sacramento State	Hornet Stadium; Sacramento, CA	L 12–31	1,108–1,850	
November 3	at No. 7 UC Davis	Toomey Field; Davis, CA	L 16–52	4,782–7,500	
November 10	Humboldt State	Cossacks Stadium; Rohnert Park, CA	W 17–15	100–596	
November 17	at Azusa Pacific*	Azusa, CA	L 20–37	740	
*Non-conference game; Rankings from NCAA Division II Football Committee Poll released prior to the game
