= 1981 Sam Houston State Bearkats football team =

American college football season

1981 Sam Houston State Bearkats football
- Conference: Lone Star Conference
- Record: 2–8 (2–5 LSC)
- Head coach: Melvin Brown (4th season)
- Home stadium: Pritchett Field

1981 Lone Star Conference football standings
	Conf.					Overall
Team	W		L		T	W		L		T
No. 4 Southwest Texas State $^	6	–	1	–	0	13	–	1	–	0
No. 9 Texas A&I	5	–	2	–	0	9	–	2	–	0
Abilene Christian	5	–	2	–	0	8	–	2	–	0
Angelo State	5	–	2	–	0	8	–	3	–	0
No. 17 East Texas State	4	–	3	–	0	7	–	4	–	0
Sam Houston State	2	–	5	–	0	3	–	7	–	0
Howard Payne	1	–	6	–	0	3	–	7	–	0
Stephen F. Austin	0	–	7	–	0	1	–	10	–	0
$ – Conference champion; ^ – NCAA Division II playoff participant; Rankings from NCAA Division II Football Committee poll for Southwest Texas State and Texas A&I and NAIA Division I poll for East Texas State

The 1981 Sam Houston State Bearkats football team represented Sam Houston State University as a member of the Lone Star Conference (LSC) during the 1981 NCAA Division II football season. Led by fourth-year head coach Melvin Brown, the Bearkats compiled an overall record of 2–8 with a mark of 2–5 in conference play, and finished sixth in the LSC.

== Schedule ==
Date	Opponent	Site	Result	Attendance	Source
September 19	vs. Lamar*	Houston Astrodome; Houston, TX	L 7–50	12,500	
September 26	Southwestern Oklahoma State*	Pritchett Field; Huntsville, TX	L 14–23	3,000	
October 3	Texas Lutheran*	Pritchett Field; Huntsville, TX	L 13–22	3,800	
October 10	at East Texas State	Memorial Stadium; Commerce, TX	L 14–37	1,200–1,800	
October 17	at Southwest Texas State	Bobcat Stadium; San Marcos, TX (rivalry)	L 14–38	11,211	
October 24	Texas A&I	Pritchett Field; Huntsville, TX	L 7–10	6,500	
October 31	at Howard Payne	Cen-Tex Stadium; Brownwood, TX	W 28–17	4,000	
November 7	Abilene Christian	Pritchett Field; Huntsville, TX	L 13–27	2,100	
November 14	Angelo State	Pritchett Field; Huntsville, TX	L 10–38	1,200	
November 21	at Stephen F. Austin	Lumberjack Stadium; Nacogdoches, TX (rivalry)	W 18–17	1,700	
*Non-conference game
