= 1984 Cal State Northridge Matadors football team =

American college football season

1984 Cal State Northridge Matadors football
- Conference: Western Football Conference
- Record: 3–7 (0–3 WFC)
- Head coach: Tom Keele (6th season)
- Defensive coordinator: Mark Banker (2nd season)
- Home stadium: North Campus Stadium

1984 Western Football Conference standings
	Conf.					Overall
Team	W		L		T	W		L		T
Portland State $	3	–	0	–	0	8	–	3	–	0
Cal Poly	2	–	1	–	0	6	–	4	–	0
Santa Clara	1	–	2	–	0	7	–	4	–	0
Cal State Northridge	0	–	3	–	0	3	–	7	–	0
Cal Lutheran *	0	–	0	–	0	5	–	4	–	1
$ – Conference champion; * – Ineligible for conference title

The 1984 Cal State Northridge Matadors football team represented California State University, Northridge as a member of the Western Football Conference (WFC) during the 1984 NCAA Division II football season. Led by sixth-year head coach Tom Keele, Cal State Northridge finished the season with overall record of 2–8 and a mark of 0–4 in conference play, placing last out of four team eligible or the conference title in the WFC. The team was outscored by its opponents 248 to 119 for the season. The Matadors played home games at North Campus Stadium in Northridge, California.

On January 1, 1985, the Northern California Athletic Conference (NCAC) announced it had ruled that San Francisco State had used two ineligible players and must forfeit three victories, including anon-conference wins over Cal State Northridge. With the forfeit, the Matadors' 1984 overall record improved to 3–7.

== Schedule ==
Date	Opponent	Site	Result	Attendance	Source
September 8	at Northern Arizona*	Walkup Skydome; Flagstaff, AZ	L 10–26	9,145–9,600	
September 15	Sacramento State*	North Campus Stadium; Northridge, CA	W 24–13	2,244	
September 22	at San Francisco State*	Cox Stadium; San Francisco, CA	W 17–21 (forfeit win)	1,000–1,021	
September 29	Cal State Hayward*	North Campus Stadium; Northridge, CA	L 26–38	1,075	
October 13	Saint Mary's*	North Campus Stadium; Northridge, CA	L 19–20	1,447	
October 20	at Cal Poly	Mustang Stadium; San Luis Obispo, CA	L 0–28	6,970	
October 27	at Cal Lutheran*	Mt. Clef Field; Thousand Oaks, CA	W 17–15	1,844	
November 3	at Santa Clara	Buck Shaw Stadium; Santa Clara, CA	L 0–31	2,265	
November 10	No. 6 UC Davis*	North Campus Stadium; Northridge, CA	L 3–42	4,912	
November 17	Portland State	North Campus Stadium; Northridge, CA	L 3–14	617	
*Non-conference game; Rankings from NCAA Division II Football Committee Poll released prior to the game

== Team players in the NFL ==
No Cal State Northridge players were selected in the 1985 NFL draft.

The following finished their college career in 1984 were not drafted, but played in the NFL.

Player	Position	First NFL team
Bryan Wagner	Punter	1987 Chicago Bears
