= 1981 Sonoma State Cossacks football team =

American college football season

1981 Sonoma State Cossacks football
- Conference: Independent
- Record: 3–7
- Head coach: Milt Cerf (2nd season)
- Home stadium: Cossacks Stadium

1981 NCAA Division II independents football records
	Conf.			Overall
Team	W	L	T	W		L		T
No. 1 Northern Michigan ^		–		11	–	1	–	0
Puget Sound		–		10	–	2	–	0
West Chester		–		8	–	3	–	0
Eastern Washington		–		7	–	3	–	0
Saint Mary's		–		7	–	3	–	0
Southern Connecticut State		–		6	–	3	–	1
Alabama State		–		5	–	4	–	1
Arkansas–Pine Bluff		–		5	–	4	–	2
Central Connecticut		–		5	–	5	–	0
Mankato State		–		5	–	5	–	0
Towson State		–		5	–	5	–	0
Springfield		–		5	–	4	–	0
New Haven		–		4	–	4	–	2
Morgan State		–		4	–	5	–	0
St. Cloud State		–		4	–	6	–	1
Central State (OH)		–		4	–	7	–	0
Sonoma State		–		3	–	7	–	0
Kentucky State		–		2	–	6	–	0
Santa Clara		–		2	–	8	–	0
Portland State		–		2	–	9	–	0
American International		–		1	–	8	–	0
Liberty		–		1	–	9	–	0
^ – NCAA Division II playoff participant; Rankings from NCAA Division II Football Committee poll

The 1981 Sonoma State Cossacks football team represented Sonoma State University as an independent during the 1981 NCAA Division II football season. Led by Milt Cerf in his second and final season as head coach, Sonoma State compiled a record of 3–7. The team was outscored by its opponents 245 to 117 for the season. The Cossacks played home games at Cossacks Stadium (Note: Cossacks Stadium was renamed in 2002 to Seawolf Stadium when the University changed the name of the mascot to Seawolves.) in Rohnert Park, California.

== Schedule ==
Date	Opponent	Site	Result	Attendance	Source
September 12	at Southern Utah State	Eccles Coliseum; Cedar City, UT	L 20–35	200	
September 19	at Redlands	Redlands Stadium; Redlands, CA	L 7–20	700	
September 26	San Francisco	Cossacks Stadium; Rohnert Park, CA	W 14–6	700	
October 3	La Verne	Cossacks Stadium; Rohnert Park, CA	W 16–7	250–400	
October 17	at Saint Mary's	Saint Mary's Stadium; Moraga, CA	L 8–50	2,500	
October 24	at Humboldt State	Redwood Bowl; Arcata, CA	L 14–40	2,500	
October 31	Cal Lutheran	Cossacks Stadium; Rohnert Park, CA	L 7–37	1,000	
November 7	Azusa Pacific	Cossacks Stadium; Rohnert Park, CA	L 6–41	450–500	
November 14	Chapman	Cossacks Stadium; Rohnert Park, CA	W 25–0	500	
November 21	Southern Oregon	Cossacks Stadium; Rohnert Park, CA	L 0–9	50	
