= 1981 Chico State Wildcats football team =

American college football season

1981 Chico State Wildcats football
- Conference: Far Western Conference
- Record: 5–5 (3–2 FWC)
- Head coach: Dick Trimmer (8th season)
- Defensive coordinator: Mike Clemons (3rd season)
- Home stadium: University Stadium

1981 Far Western Conference football standings
	Conf.					Overall
Team	W		L		T	W		L		T
UC Davis +	4	–	1	–	0	6	–	4	–	0
Cal State Hayward +	4	–	1	–	0	6	–	4	–	1
Humboldt State	3	–	2	–	0	6	–	4	–	0
Chico State	3	–	2	–	0	5	–	5	–	0
Sacramento State	1	–	4	–	0	5	–	6	–	0
San Francisco State	0	–	5	–	0	3	–	7	–	0
+ – Conference co-champions

The 1981 Chico State Wildcats football team represented California State University, Chico as a member of the Far Western Conference (FWC) during the 1981 NCAA Division II football season. Led by eighth-year head coach Dick Trimmer, Chico State compiled an overall record of 5–5 with a mark of 3–2 in conference play, tying for third place in the FWC. The team was outscored by its opponents 200 to 181 for the season. The Wildcats played home games at University Stadium in Chico, California.

== Schedule ==
Date	Opponent	Site	Result	Attendance	Source
September 5	at Puget Sound*	Baker Stadium; Tacoma, WA	L 12–20	4,710	
September 12	at Saint Mary's*	Saint Mary's Stadium; Moraga, CA	L 16–21	3,600	
September 26	Santa Clara*	University Stadium; Chico, CA	W 10–7	5,382	
October 3	Simon Fraser*	University Stadium; Chico, CA	W 31–21	5,417	
October 10	at No. 9 Cal State Northridge*	North Campus Stadium; Northridge, CA	L 16–38	584	
October 17	at Cal State Hayward	Pioneer Stadium; Hayward, CA	L 10–17	1,717	
October 24	Sacramento State	University Stadium; Chico, CA	W 34–24	5,310–5,562	
October 31	Humboldt State	University Stadium; Chico, CA	W 26–7	2,322–2,372	
November 7	at UC Davis	Toomey Field; Davis, CA	L 9–38	6,412–6,500	
November 14	San Francisco State	University Stadium; Chico, CA	W 17–7	1,578–2,488	
*Non-conference game; Rankings from Associated Press Poll released prior to the game
