= 1981 Cal State Hayward Pioneers football team =

American college football season

1981 Cal State Hayward Pioneers football
- Conference: Far Western Conference
- Record: 6–4–1 (4–1 FWC)
- Head coach: Tim Tierney (7th season)
- Home stadium: Pioneer Stadium

1981 Far Western Conference football standings
	Conf.					Overall
Team	W		L		T	W		L		T
UC Davis +	4	–	1	–	0	6	–	4	–	0
Cal State Hayward +	4	–	1	–	0	6	–	4	–	1
Humboldt State	3	–	2	–	0	6	–	4	–	0
Chico State	3	–	2	–	0	5	–	5	–	0
Sacramento State	1	–	4	–	0	5	–	6	–	0
San Francisco State	0	–	5	–	0	3	–	7	–	0
+ – Conference co-champions

The 1981 Cal State Hayward Pioneers football team represented California State University, Hayward—now known as California State University, East Bay—as a member of the Far Western Conference (FWC) during the 1981 NCAA Division II football season. Led by seventh-year head coach Tim Tierney, Cal State Hayward compiled an overall record of 6–4–1 with a mark of 4–1 in conference play, sharing the FWC title with UC Davis. The team outscored its opponents 201 to 135 for the season. The Pioneers played home games at Pioneer Stadium in Hayward, California.

== Schedule ==
Date	Opponent	Site	Result	Attendance	Source
September 12	at Cal State Northridge*	North Campus Stadium; Northridge, CA	T 7–7	2,000	
September 19	Santa Clara*	Pioneer Stadium; Hayward, CA	W 31–14	2,000	
September 26	at No. 4 Puget Sound*	Baker Stadium; Tacoma, WA	L 9–17		
October 3	at Saint Mary's*	Saint Mary's Stadium; Moraga, CA	L 15–17		
October 10	Eastern Washington*	Pioneer Stadium; Hayward, CA	L 10–24		
October 17	Chico State	Pioneer Stadium; Hayward, CA	W 17–10	1,717	
October 24	at Cal Poly Pomona*	Kellogg Field; Pomona, CA	W 22–0	861	
October 31	at Sacramento State	Hornet Stadium; Sacramento, CA	W 27–10	3,461	
November 7	Humboldt State	Pioneer Stadium; Hayward, CA	W 36–7	2,000	
November 14	UC Davis	Pioneer Stadium; Hayward, CA	L 14–23	1,500	
November 21	at San Francisco State	Cox Stadium; San Francisco, CA	W 13–6	812	
*Non-conference game; Rankings from NCAA Division II Football Committee Poll released prior to the game
