= 1984 Chico State Wildcats football team =

American college football season

1984 Chico State Wildcats football
- Conference: Northern California Athletic Conference
- Record: 4–5–1 (2–3–1 NCAC)
- Head coach: Mike Bellotti (1st season)
- Offensive coordinator: Nick Aliotti (1st season)
- Home stadium: University Stadium

1984 Northern California Athletic Conference football standings
	Conf.					Overall
Team	W		L		T	W		L		T
No. T–6 UC Davis $^	6	–	0	–	0	9	–	2	–	0
Sacramento State	5	–	1	–	0	6	–	5	–	0
Cal State Hayward	4	–	2	–	0	7	–	3	–	0
Chico State	2	–	3	–	1	4	–	5	–	1
Sonoma State	2	–	4	–	0	2	–	8	–	0
San Francisco State	1	–	4	–	1	1	–	8	–	1
Humboldt State	0	–	6	–	0	0	–	10	–	0
$ – Conference champion; ^ – NCAA Division II playoff participant; San Francisco State forfeited 3 wins including 1 conference win over Sonoma State.; Rankings from NCAA Division II Football Committee poll

The 1984 Chico State Wildcats football team represented California State University, Chico as a member of the Northern California Athletic Conference (NCAC) during the 1984 NCAA Division II football season. Led by first-year head coach Mike Bellotti, Chico State compiled an overall record of 4–5–1 with a mark of 2–3–1 in conference play, placing fourth in the NCAC. The team outscored its opponents 214 to 205 for the season. The Wildcats played home games at University Stadium in Chico, California.

== Schedule ==
Date	Opponent	Site	Result	Attendance	Source
September 8	Santa Clara*	University Stadium; Chico, CA	L 14–21	4,312–4,321	
September 15	at Idaho State*	ASISU Minidome; Pocatello, ID	L 23–47	8,541	
September 29	San Diego*	University Stadium; Chico, CA	W 23–0	2,359	
October 6	Sonoma State	University Stadium; Chico, CA	W 31–10	1,745–2,238	
October 13	at UC Davis	Toomey Field; Davis, CA	L 13–16	8,900–9,000	
October 20	Sacramento State	University Stadium; Chico, CA	L 15–29	4,621	
October 27	at Humboldt State	Redwood Bowl; Arcata, CA	W 33–10	1,230–1,381	
November 3	Saint Mary's*	University Stadium; Chico, CA	W 20–17	1,600	
November 10	at San Francisco State	Cox Stadium; San Francisco, CA	T 14–14	250–712	
November 17	Cal State Hayward	University Stadium; Chico, CA	L 28–41	1,250	
*Non-conference game
