= 1984 UC Davis Aggies football team =

American college football season

1984 UC Davis Aggies football

NCAC champion

NCAA Division II Quarterfinal, L 23–31 at North Dakota State
- Conference: Northern California Athletic Conference
- Record: 9–2 (6–0 NCAC)
- Head coach: Jim Sochor (15th season)
- Home stadium: Toomey Field

1984 Northern California Athletic Conference football standings
| | Conf. | | | | | Overall |
| Team | W | | L | | T | W | | L | | T |
|---|---|---|---|---|---|---|---|---|---|---|
| No. T–6 UC Davis $^ | 6 | – | 0 | – | 0 | 9 | – | 2 | – | 0 |
| Sacramento State | 5 | – | 1 | – | 0 | 6 | – | 5 | – | 0 |
| Cal State Hayward | 4 | – | 2 | – | 0 | 7 | – | 3 | – | 0 |
| Chico State | 2 | – | 3 | – | 1 | 4 | – | 5 | – | 1 |
| Sonoma State | 2 | – | 4 | – | 0 | 2 | – | 8 | – | 0 |
| San Francisco State | 1 | – | 4 | – | 1 | 1 | – | 8 | – | 1 |
| Humboldt State | 0 | – | 6 | – | 0 | 0 | – | 10 | – | 0 |
$ – Conference champion; ^ – NCAA Division II playoff participant; San Francisco State forfeited 3 wins including 1 conference win over Sonoma State.; Rankings from NCAA Division II Football Committee poll

The 1984 UC Davis football team represented the University of California, Davis as a member of the Northern California Athletic Conference (NCAC) during the 1984 NCAA Division II football season. Led by 15th-year head coach Jim Sochor, UC Davis compiled an overall record of 9–2 with a mark of 6–0 in conference play, winning the NCAC title for the 14th consecutive season. 1984 was the team's 15th consecutive winning season. With the 6–0 conference record, the team stretched their conference winning streak to 21 games dating back to the 1981 season. The Aggies were ranked as high as No. 6 in the NCAA Division II poll. They advanced to the NCAA Division II Football Championship playoffs for the third straight year, where they lost to North Dakota State in the quarterfinals. This was the second straight year that North Dakota State eliminated UC Davis in the playoffs. The team outscored its opponents 295 to 133 for the season. The Aggies played home games at Toomey Field in Davis, California.

== Schedule ==
| Date | Opponent | Rank | Site | Result | Attendance | Source |
|---|---|---|---|---|---|---|
| September 15 | at Cal Lutheran* | | Mt. Clef Field; Thousand Oaks, CA | W 13–0 | 1,000–3,100 | |
| September 22 | at Santa Clara | No. 8 | Buck Shaw Stadium; Santa Clara, CA | L 21–24 | 7,129 | |
| September 29 | Cal Poly* | | Toomey Field; Davis, CA (rivalry) | W 10–6 | 9,500 | |
| October 6 | at Humboldt State | | Redwood Bowl; Arcata, CA | W 46–0 | 2,200–2,475 | |
| October 13 | Chico State | | Toomey Field; Davis, CA | W 16–13 | 8,900–9,000 | |
| October 20 | at San Francisco State | No. 9 | Cox Stadium; San Francisco, CA | W 21–7 | 2,000 | |
| October 27 | at Cal State Hayward | No. T–9 | Pioneer Stadium; Hayward, CA | W 13–12 | 8,200–8,900 | |
| November 3 | Sonoma State | No. 7 | Toomey Field; Davis, CA | W 52–16 | 4,782–7,500 | |
| November 10 | at Cal State Northridge* | No. 6 | North Campus Stadium; Northridge, CA | W 42–3 | 4,912 | |
| November 17 | Sacramento State | No. T–6 | Toomey Field; Davis, CA (Causeway Classic) | W 38–21 | 8,900 | |
| November 24 | at No. 1 North Dakota State* | No. 6 | Dacotah Field; Fargo, ND (NCAA Division II Quarterfinal) | L 23–31 | 13,758 | |
*Non-conference game; Rankings from NCAA Division II Football Committee Poll released prior to the game

== NFL draft ==
The following UC Davis Aggies players were selected in the 1985 NFL draft.

| Player | Position | Round | Overall | NFL team |
| Scott Barry | Quarterback | 6 | 168 | San Francisco 49ers |
