= 1981 Virginia Union Panthers football team =

American college football season

1981 Virginia Union Panthers football

Black college national champion CIAA champion

CIAA Championship Game, W 45–7 vs. North Carolina Central

NCAA Division II First Round, L 27–40 vs. Shippensburg State
- Conference: Central Intercollegiate Athletic Association
- Northern Division
- Record: 11–1 (7–0 CIAA)
- Head coach: Willard Bailey (11th season)
- Home stadium: Hovey Field

1981 Central Intercollegiate Athletic Association football standings
	Conf.					Overall
Team	W		L		T	W		L		T
Northern Division
No. 2 Virginia Union xy$^	7	–	0	–	0	11	–	1	–	0
Elizabeth City State ^	6	–	1	–	0	8	–	3	–	0
No. 10 Hampton	5	–	2	–	0	8	–	2	–	0
Norfolk State	3	–	4	–	0	4	–	5	–	1
Virginia State	3	–	4	–	0	4	–	6	–	0
Saint Paul's (VA)	0	–	7	–	0	0	–	10	–	0
Southern Division
North Carolina Central xy	6	–	1	–	0	7	–	4	–	0
Winston-Salem State	4	–	3	–	0	5	–	5	–	0
Johnson C. Smith	3	–	4	–	0	4	–	6	–	0
Fayetteville State	2	–	5	–	0	3	–	5	–	0
Livingstone	1	–	6	–	0	3	–	7	–	0
Bowie State *	2	–	5	–	0	5	–	5	–	0
Championship: Virginia Union 45, North Carolina Central 7
$ – Conference champion; x – Division champion/co-champions; y – Championship game participant; ^ – NCAA Division II playoff participant; * – ineligible for conference title; Rankings from NCAA Division II Football Committee poll for Virginia Union and NAIA Division I poll for Hampton

The 1981 Virginia Union Panthers football team represented Virginia Union University as a member of the Central Intercollegiate Athletic Association (CIAA) during the 1981 NCAA Division II football season. Led by 11th-year head coach Willard Bailey, the Panthers compiled an overall record of 11–1 and a mark of 7–0 in conference play, and finished as CIAA champions after they defeated North Carolina Central in the first CIAA Championship Game. Virginia Union finished their season with a loss against Shippensburg State in the Division II playoffs. At the conclusion of the season, the Panthers were also recognized as black college national champion.

== Schedule ==
Date	Opponent	Rank	Site	Result	Attendance	Source
September 12	North Carolina Central		Hovey Field; Richmond, VA	W 27–7	5,500	
September 19	at Hampton		Armstrong Stadium; Hampton, VA	W 34–14	5,100	
September 26	Winston-Salem State	No. 5	Hovey Field; Richmond, VA	W 36–7	3,000	
October 3	at Saint Paul's (VA)	No. 4	Brunswick H.S. Stadium; Lawrenceville, VA	W 55–6	700	
October 10	at Clark (GA)*	No. 4	Lakewood Stadium; Atlanta, GA	W 42–0		
October 17	Bowie State	No. 3	Hovey Field; Richmond, VA	W 25–0	1,300	
October 24	Norfolk State	No. 3	Hovey Field; Richmond, VA	W 43–13	6,300	
October 31	vs. Virginia State	No. 3	City Stadium; Richmond, VA (Gold Bowl Classic)	W 14–12	12,000	
November 7	Morgan State*	No. 3	Hovey Field; Richmond, VA	W 38–0		
November 14	No. 5 Elizabeth City State	No. 3	Hovey Field; Richmond, VA	W 16–7		
November 21	vs. North Carolina Central	No. 3	American Legion Memorial Stadium; Charlotte, NC (CIAA Championship Game)	W 45–7	12,500	
November 28	No. 8 Shippensburg State*	No. 2	Hovey Field; Richmond, VA (NCAA Division II First Round)	L 27–40		
*Non-conference game; Rankings from NCAA Division II Football Committee Poll released prior to the game
