= Bill Rademacher =

American football player and coach (1942–2018)

No. 23, 33, 83
- Positions: Wide receiver, defensive back

Personal information
- Born: May 13, 1942; Menominee, Michigan, U.S.
- Died: April 2, 2018 (aged 75); Marquette, Michigan, U.S.
- Listed height: 6 ft 1 in (1.85 m)
- Listed weight: 190 lb (86 kg)

Career information
- High school: Menominee
- College: Northern Michigan
- NFL draft: 1964: undrafted

Career history

Playing
- New York Jets (1964–1968); Boston Patriots (1969–1970)

Coaching
- Xavier (1972–1973) (assistant); Northern Michigan (1974–1977) (assistant); Northern Michigan (1978–1982); Michigan State (1983–1991) (LB)

Awards and highlights
- Upper Peninsula Sports Hall of Fame (1983); Northern Michigan University Sports Hall of Fame (1981); Super Bowl champion (III); AFL champion (1968)

Career NFL statistics
- Receiving yards: 282
- Receptions: 24
- Receiving TDs: 3
- Games played: 58
- Games started: 5
- Stats at Pro Football Reference

William Stiles Rademacher (May 13, 1942 – April 2, 2018) was an American professional football player who played as a wide receiver for seven seasons for the New York Jets and Boston Patriots. He earned MVP honors in 1963 In January 1969 he played in Super Bowl III.

During Rademacher's tenure as assistant coach at Northern Michigan University, the football team went from a 0–10 season in 1974 to a 13–1 season in 1975 and won the NCAA Division II Football Championship.

Rademacher became Northern Michigan's head coach in 1978, earning a record of 37–16–1 in five seasons and three NCAA Division II tournament appearances. He was named Association of Mid-Continent Universities Coach of the Year in 1980, and Northern Michigan went 10–0 in the 1981 regular season. He left to coach the linebackers at Michigan State from 1983 to 1991.

Rademacher was inducted into the Northern Michigan University Hall of Fame in the 1981 and the Upper Peninsula Sports Hall of Fame in 1983.

== Head coaching record ==
Year	Team	Overall	Conference	Standing	Bowl/playoffs
Northern Michigan Wildcats (Association of Mid-Continent Universities) (1978–1980)
1978	Northern Michigan	5–4–1	1–3–1	T–4th	
1979	Northern Michigan	4–6	1–4	T–4th	
1980	Northern Michigan	9–2	3–1	2nd	L NCAA Division II Quarterfinal
Northern Michigan Wildcats (NCAA Division II independent) (1981–1982)
1981	Northern Michigan	11–1			L NCAA Division II Semifinal
1982	Northern Michigan	8–3			L NCAA Division II Quarterfinal
Northern Michigan:		37–16–1	5–8–1		
Total:		37–16–1			
