= Dick Trimmer =

American football and wrestling coach

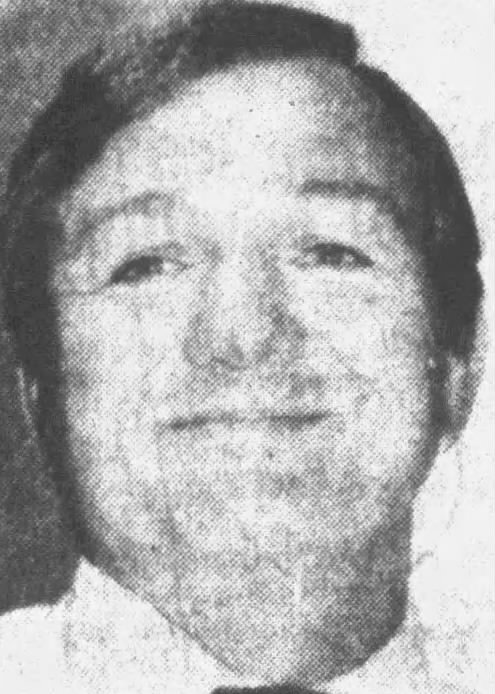

Biographical details
- Born: c. 1937

Playing career

Football
- 1956–1960: Colorado State–Greeley

Wrestling
- c. 1960: Colorado State–Greeley
- Position: Tackle (football)

Coaching career (HC unless noted)

Football
- 1967: North Phoenix HS (AZ)
- 1968–1973: Chico State (assistant)
- 1974–1983: Chico State

Wrestling
- 1963–1966: Phoenix Central HS (AZ)
- 1967–1968: North Phoenix HS (AZ)
- 1968–1974: Chico State

Track and field
- 1967–1968: North Phoenix HS (AZ)

Head coaching record
- Overall: 48–52–2 (college football)

Richard Trimmer (born c. 1937) is an American former football and wrestling coach. He served as the head football coach at California State University, Chico from 1974 to 1983, compiling a coaching record of 48–52–2.

Trimmer attended Colorado State College of Education at Greeley—now known as University of Northern Colorado—where he played college football as a tackle, earning all-Rocky Mountain Conference (RMC) honors. He received a bachelor's degree and a master's degree from Colorado State–Greeley, and later pursued a doctorate at the University of Utah. In 1968, Trimmer was hired as the head wrestling coach at Chico State. He also served as an assistant football coach at Chico State under Pete Riehlman from 1968 until succeeding Riehlman as head football coach in 1974. In December 1983, Timmer resigned at Chico State's head football coach. He was replaced in early 1984 by Mike Bellotti.

== Head coaching record ==
=== College football ===
Year	Team	Overall	Conference	Standing	Bowl/playoffs
Chico State Wildcats (Far Western Conference / Northern California Athletic Conference) (1974–1983)
1974	Chico State	4–7	2–3	T–2nd	
1975	Chico State	4–6	2–3	T–3rd	
1976	Chico State	5–6	2–3	T–3rd	
1977	Chico State	6–2–1	3–1–1	2nd	
1978	Chico State	5–5	2–3	4th	
1979	Chico State	5–6	2–3	T–3rd	
1980	Chico State	5–5	3–2	T–2nd	
1981	Chico State	5–5	3–2	T–3rd	
1982	Chico State	5–5	1–4	T–5th	
1983	Chico State	4–5–1	3–2–1	3rd	
Chico State:		48–52–2	23–26–2		
Total:		48–52–2			
