= 1984 North Dakota State Bison football team =

American college football season

1984 North Dakota State Bison football

NCC co-champion

NCAA Division II Championship Game, L 17–18 vs. Troy State
- Conference: North Central Conference
- Record: 11–2 (8–1 NCC)
- Head coach: Don Morton (6th season)
- Home stadium: Dacotah Field

1984 North Central Conference football standings
	Conf.					Overall
Team	W		L		T	W		L		T
No. 1 North Dakota State +^	8	–	1	–	0	11	–	2	–	0
No. 2 Nebraska–Omaha +^	8	–	1	–	0	11	–	2	–	0
South Dakota	7	–	2	–	0	8	–	3	–	0
North Dakota	6	–	3	–	0	8	–	3	–	0
Morningside	5	–	4	–	0	6	–	5	–	0
Mankato State	3	–	6	–	0	4	–	7	–	0
Northern Colorado	3	–	6	–	0	3	–	8	–	0
St. Cloud State	2	–	7	–	0	4	–	7	–	0
South Dakota State	2	–	7	–	0	3	–	8	–	0
Augustana (SD)	0	–	9	–	0	1	–	10	–	0
+ – Conference co-champions; ^ – NCAA Division II playoff participant; Rankings from NCAA Division II Football Committee poll

The 1984 North Dakota State Bison football team was an American football team that represented North Dakota State University during the 1984 NCAA Division II football season as a member of the North Central Conference. In their sixth year under head coach Don Morton, the team compiled an 11–2 record, finished as NCC co-champion, and lost to Troy State in the NCAA Division II championship game.

== Schedule ==
Date	Opponent	Rank	Site	Result	Attendance	Source
September 8	Northern Michigan*		Dacotah Field; Fargo, ND	W 38–12	12,300	
September 15	Mankato State		Dacotah Field; Fargo, ND	L 21–28	13,100	
September 22	at Augustana (SD)		Howard Wood Field; Sioux Falls, SD	W 49–28	3,120	
September 29	No. 3 Nebraska–Omaha		Dacotah Field; Fargo, ND	W 41–23	11,500	
October 6	at South Dakota	No. 9	DakotaDome; Vermillion, SD	W 35–11	5,500	
October 13	South Dakota State^{†}	No. 7	Dacotah Field; Fargo, ND (rivalry)	W 55–30	14,400	
October 20	at Northern Colorado	No. 5	Jackson Field; Greeley, CO	W 62–14	750	
October 27	at No. 10 North Dakota	No. 3	Memorial Stadium; Grand Forks, ND (Nickel Trophy)	W 14–3	10,000	
November 3	Morningside	No. 1	Dacotah Field; Fargo, ND	W 42–7	9,500	
November 10	at St. Cloud State	No. 1	Selke Field; St. Cloud, MN	W 33–14	850	
November 24	No. 6 UC Davis*	No. 1	Dacotah Field; Fargo, ND (NCAA Division II Quarterfinal)	W 31–23	13,758	
December 1	No. 2 Nebraska–Omaha	No. 1	Dacotah Field; Fargo, ND (NCAA Division II Semifinal)	W 25–14	11,090	
December 8	vs. No. 3 Troy State*	No. 1	McAllen Veterans Memorial Stadium; McAllen, TX (NCAA Division II Championship Game—Palm Bowl)	L 17–18	4,500	
*Non-conference game; ^{†}Homecoming; Rankings from NCAA Division II Football Committee Poll released prior to the game
