= 1981 Sacramento State Hornets football team =

American college football season

1981 Sacramento State Hornets football
- Conference: Far Western Conference
- Record: 5–6 (1–4 FWC)
- Head coach: Bob Mattos (4th season)
- Home stadium: Hornet Stadium

1981 Far Western Conference football standings
	Conf.					Overall
Team	W		L		T	W		L		T
UC Davis +	4	–	1	–	0	6	–	4	–	0
Cal State Hayward +	4	–	1	–	0	6	–	4	–	1
Humboldt State	3	–	2	–	0	6	–	4	–	0
Chico State	3	–	2	–	0	5	–	5	–	0
Sacramento State	1	–	4	–	0	5	–	6	–	0
San Francisco State	0	–	5	–	0	3	–	7	–	0
+ – Conference co-champions

The 1981 Sacramento State Hornets football team represented California State University, Sacramento as a member of the Far Western Conference (FWC) during the 1981 NCAA Division II football season. Led by fourth-year head coach Bob Mattos, Sacramento State compiled an overall record of 5–6 with a mark of 1–4 in conference play, placing fifth in the FWC. The team outscored its opponents 256 to 186 for the season. The Hornets played home games at Hornet Stadium in Sacramento, California.

== Schedule ==
Date	Opponent	Site	Result	Attendance	Source
September 12	at San Francisco*	San Francisco, CA	W 47–0	4,517	
September 19	Cal Poly Pomona*	Hornet Stadium; Sacramento, CA	L 7–14	4,810	
September 26	at Saint Mary's*	Saint Mary's Stadium; Moraga, CA	W 14–9	4,000	
October 3	Redlands*	Hornet Stadium; Sacramento, CA	W 45–8	4,030	
October 10	San Francisco State	Hornet Stadium; Sacramento, CA	W 38–17	4,090	
October 17	at Cal Lutheran*	Mt. Clef Field; Thousand Oaks, CA	L 6–13	1,500	
October 24	at Chico State	University Stadium; Chico, CA	L 24–34	5,310–5,562	
October 31	Cal State Hayward	Hornet Stadium; Sacramento, CA	L 10–27	3,461	
November 7	Cal State Northridge*	Hornet Stadium; Sacramento, CA	W 33–20	2,503	
November 14	at Humboldt State	Redwood Bowl; Arcata, CA	L 19–23	1,700–1,723	
November 21	at UC Davis	Toomey Field; Davis, CA (rivalry)	L 13–21	5,600	
*Non-conference game

== Roster ==
1981 Sacramento State Hornets football team roster
Players
Coaches
Offense

Pos.	#	Name	Class
QB	8	Mike Sullivan	Jr
QB	12	Steve Armstrong	So
QB	18	Gary Hightower	Jr
RB	33	John Farley	So

Defense

Pos.	#	Name	Class
DB	3	Carl Beck	Jr
DB	5	Rod Avery	Jr
DB	7	Mike Reller	So
CB	21	Jim Verducco	Sr
DB	22	Jon Simas	Jr
DB	42	Jim Brown	Sr

Special teams

Pos.	#	Name	Class
P	2	Stu Hall	Sr

Head coach

- Bob Mattos

Coordinators/assistant coaches

Legend

- (C) Team captain
- (S) Suspended
- (I) Ineligible
- Injured
- Redshirt
