= 1981 Cal Poly Mustangs football team =

American college football season

1981 Cal Poly Mustangs football
- Conference: California Collegiate Athletic Association
- Record: 4–5 (0–2 CCAA)
- Head coach: Joe Harper (14th season)
- Home stadium: Mustang Stadium

1981 California Collegiate Athletic Association football standings
	Conf.					Overall
Team	W		L		T	W		L		T
Cal State Northridge $	2	–	0	–	0	6	–	4	–	1
Cal Poly Pomona	1	–	1	–	0	4	–	7	–	0
Cal Poly	0	–	2	–	0	4	–	5	–	0
$ – Conference champion

The 1981 Cal Poly Mustangs football team represented California Polytechnic State University, San Luis Obispo as a member of the California Collegiate Athletic Association (CCAA) during the 1981 NCAA Division II football season. Led by Joe Harper in his 14th and final season as head coach, Cal Poly compiled an overall record of 4–5 with a mark of 0–2 in conference play, placing last out of three teams in the CCAA. The Mustangs played home games at Mustang Stadium in San Luis Obispo, California.

1981 was the last season for CCAA football. The Mustangs won 12 football championships in their 36 years of membership, from 1946 to 1981,. All three 1981 football members of the CCAA (Cal State Northridge, Cal Poly Pomona, and Cal Poly) moved their football programs to the newly formed Western Football Conference (WFC) for the 1982 season.

== Schedule ==
Date	Opponent	Site	Result	Attendance	Source
September 12	Cal Lutheran*	Mustang Stadium; San Luis Obispo, CA	W 10–0	6,972	
September 19	at Nevada*	Mackay Stadium; Reno, NV	L 3–33	8,542–8,554	
September 26	Cal Poly Pomona	Mustang Stadium; San Luis Obispo, CA	L 21–35	6,504	
October 3	at Cal State Fullerton*	Titan Field; Fullerton, CA	L 10–34	5,125	
October 10	Santa Clara*	Mustang Stadium; San Luis Obispo, CA	W 21–17	3,948	
October 17	UC Davis*	Mustang Stadium; San Luis Obispo, CA (rivalry)	W 30–0	4,356	
October 31	Portland State*	Mustang Stadium; San Luis Obispo, CA	W 41–12	4,410	
November 14	at Boise State*	Bronco Stadium; Boise, ID	L 6–17	17,260	
November 21	at Cal State Northridge	Devonshire Downs; Northridge, CA	L 14–30	2,467	
*Non-conference game

== Team players in the NFL ==
The following Cal Poly Mustang players were selected in the 1982 NFL draft.

Player	Position	Round	Overall	NFL team
Charles Daum	Defensive tackle	6	165	Dallas Cowboys
Blake Wingle	Guard	9	244	Pittsburgh Steelers
