= 1981 San Francisco State Gators football team =

American college football season

1981 San Francisco State Gators football
- Conference: Far Western Conference
- Record: 3–7 (0–5 FWC)
- Head coach: Vic Rowen (21st season)
- Home stadium: Cox Stadium

1981 Far Western Conference football standings
	Conf.					Overall
Team	W		L		T	W		L		T
UC Davis +	4	–	1	–	0	6	–	4	–	0
Cal State Hayward +	4	–	1	–	0	6	–	4	–	1
Humboldt State	3	–	2	–	0	6	–	4	–	0
Chico State	3	–	2	–	0	5	–	5	–	0
Sacramento State	1	–	4	–	0	5	–	6	–	0
San Francisco State	0	–	5	–	0	3	–	7	–	0
+ – Conference co-champions

The 1981 San Francisco State Gators football team represented San Francisco State University as a member of the Far Western Conference (FWC) during the 1981 NCAA Division II football season. Led by 21st-year head coach Vic Rowen, San Francisco State compiled an overall record of 3–7 with a mark of 0–5 in conference play, placing last out of six teams in the FWC. For the season the team outscored its opponents 171 to 162. The Gators played home games at Cox Stadium in San Francisco.

== Schedule ==
Date	Opponent	Site	Result	Attendance	Source
September 12	at Cal Poly Pomona*	Kellogg Field; Pomona, CA	W 15–10	1,300	
September 19	Cal State Northridge*	North Campus Stadium; Northridge, CA	L 14–17	1,500	
September 26	Whittier*	Cox Stadium; San Francisco, CA	W 52–20	1,000–2,500	
October 10	at Sacramento State	Hornet Stadium; Sacramento, CA	L 17–38	4,090	
October 17	Humboldt State	Cox Stadium; San Francisco, CA	L 6–14	2,500	
October 24	at UC Davis	Toomey Field; Davis, CA	L 3–6	7,000	
October 31	Saint Mary's*	Cox Stadium; San Francisco, CA	L 9–20	2,321	
November 7	Santa Clara*	Cox Stadium; San Francisco, CA	W 42–7	2,634	
November 14	at Chico State	University Stadium; Chico, CA	L 7–17	1,578–2,488	
November 21	Cal State Hayward	Cox Stadium; San Francisco, CA	L 6–13	812	
*Non-conference game
