= 1981 Northern Michigan Wildcats football team =

American college football season

1981 Northern Michigan Wildcats football

NCAA Division II Semifinal, L 0–62 vs. Southwest Texas State
- Conference: Independent
- Record: 11–1
- Head coach: Bill Rademacher (4th season)
- Home stadium: Memorial Field

1981 NCAA Division II independents football records
	Conf.			Overall
Team	W	L	T	W		L		T
No. 1 Northern Michigan ^		–		11	–	1	–	0
Puget Sound		–		10	–	2	–	0
West Chester		–		8	–	3	–	0
Eastern Washington		–		7	–	3	–	0
Saint Mary's		–		7	–	3	–	0
Southern Connecticut State		–		6	–	3	–	1
Alabama State		–		5	–	4	–	1
Arkansas–Pine Bluff		–		5	–	4	–	2
Central Connecticut		–		5	–	5	–	0
Mankato State		–		5	–	5	–	0
Towson State		–		5	–	5	–	0
Springfield		–		5	–	4	–	0
New Haven		–		4	–	4	–	2
Morgan State		–		4	–	5	–	0
St. Cloud State		–		4	–	6	–	1
Central State (OH)		–		4	–	7	–	0
Sonoma State		–		3	–	7	–	0
Kentucky State		–		2	–	6	–	0
Santa Clara		–		2	–	8	–	0
Portland State		–		2	–	9	–	0
American International		–		1	–	8	–	0
Liberty		–		1	–	9	–	0
^ – NCAA Division II playoff participant; Rankings from NCAA Division II Football Committee poll

The 1981 Northern Michigan Wildcats football team represented Northern Michigan University as an independent during the 1981 NCAA Division II football season. In their fourth year under head coach Bill Rademacher, the Wildcats compiled a record of 11–1. The team was undefeated and ranked No. 1 in the final NCAA Division II Football Committee poll at the end of the regular season. Northern Michigan advanced to the NCAA Division II Football Championship playoffs, where the Wildcats defeated Elizabeth City State in the quarterfinals before and losing to Southwest Texas State in the semifinals. The Wildcats outscored opponents by a total of 403 to 196 on the season.

Junior fullback George Works became the first player in Northern Michigan history to rush for 200 yards in a game (against Wisconsin–Superior) and the first to rush for 1,000 yards in a season. He was also the national Division II scoring champion with 21 touchdowns for 126 points in regular-season games.

The team's other statistical leaders included Tom Bertoldi with 2,454 passing yards and Scott Sible with 46 receptions for 844 yards. Middle guard Curt Wojan led the team in tackles.

== Schedule ==
Date	Opponent	Rank	Site	Result	Attendance	Source
September 5	North Dakota State		Memorial Field; Marquette, MI	W 38–0	5,806	
September 12	Wisconsin–Superior		Marquette, MI	W 64–10	5,049	
September 19	vs. Wayne State (MI)		Pontiac Silverdome; Pontiac, MI (Michi-Dome Classic)	W 52–7	4,912	
September 26	at Grand Valley State	No. 2	Allendale, MI	W 29–28	1,500	
October 3	at Northern Iowa	No. 2	UNI-Dome; Cedar Falls, IA	W 17–13	12,317	
October 17	Northwood	No. 2	Marquette, MI	W 14–0	4,901	
October 24	at Western Illinois	No. 2	Hanson Field; Macomb, IL	W 28–14	11,794	
October 31	Michigan Tech	No. 2	Marquette, MI	W 44–15	4,738	
November 7	at North Dakota	No. 2	Grand Forks, ND	W 30–11	7,400	
November 14	at Wichita State	No. 2	Cessna Stadium; Wichita, KS	W 32–30	7,103	
November 28	No. 7 Elizabeth City State	No. 1	Marquette, MI (NCAA Division II Quarterfinal)	W 55–6		
December 5	at No. 4 Southwest Texas State	No. 1	Bobcat Stadium; San Marcos, TX (NCAA Division II Semifinal)	L 0–62		
Rankings from NCAA Division II Football Committee Poll released prior to the game
