= 1984 Santa Clara Broncos football team =

American college football season

1984 Santa Clara Broncos football
- Conference: Western Football Conference
- Record: 7–4 (1–2 WFC)
- Head coach: Pat Malley (26th season)
- Home stadium: Buck Shaw Stadium

1984 Western Football Conference standings
	Conf.					Overall
Team	W		L		T	W		L		T
Portland State $	3	–	0	–	0	8	–	3	–	0
Cal Poly	2	–	1	–	0	6	–	4	–	0
Santa Clara	1	–	2	–	0	7	–	4	–	0
Cal State Northridge	0	–	3	–	0	3	–	7	–	0
Cal Lutheran *	0	–	0	–	0	5	–	4	–	1
$ – Conference champion; * – Ineligible for conference title

The 1984 Santa Clara Broncos football team represented Santa Clara University as a member of the Western Football Conference (WFC) during the 1984 NCAA Division II football season. The Broncos were led by head coach Pat Malley in his 26th and final year at the helm. The 1984 team played home games at Buck Shaw Stadium in Santa Clara, California. They finished the season with a record of seven wins and four losses (7–4, 1–2 WFC). The Broncos outscored their opponents 173–144 for the season. O'Malley finished his career at Santa Clara with an overall record of 142–100–3, a winning percentage of .586.

== Schedule ==
Date	Opponent	Rank	Site	Result	Attendance	Source
September 8	at Chico State*		University Stadium; Chico, CA	W 21–14	4,312–4,321	
September 15	Humboldt State*		Buck Shaw Stadium; Santa Clara, CA	W 38–0	4,732–4,792	
September 22	No. 8 UC Davis*		Buck Shaw Stadium; Santa Clara, CA	W 24–21	7,129	
September 29	Sacramento State*	No. 6	Buck Shaw Stadium; Santa Clara, CA	W 21–14	4,133	
October 6	Cal Poly	No. 5	Buck Shaw Stadium; Santa Clara, CA	L 10–14	5,331	
October 13	Cal State Hayward*	No. 9	Buck Shaw Stadium; Santa Clara, CA	L 15–30	5,469	
October 20	at Cal Lutheran*		Mt. Clef Field; Thousand Oaks, CA	L 7–13	3,007	
October 27	San Francisco State*		Buck Shaw Stadium; Santa Clara, CA	W 12–6	2,131	
November 3	Cal State Northridge		Buck Shaw Stadium; Santa Clara, CA	W 31–0	2,265	
November 10	at Portland State		Civic Stadium; Portland, OR	L 6–27	3,341	
November 17	at Saint Mary's*		Saint Mary's Stadium; Moraga, CA	W 28–6	5,589	
*Non-conference game; Rankings from NCAA Division II Football Committee Poll released prior to the game
