= 1981 Humboldt State Lumberjacks football team =

American college football season

1981 Humboldt State Lumberjacks football
- Conference: Far Western Conference
- Record: 6–4 (3–2 FWC)
- Head coach: Bud Van Deren (16th season)
- Home stadium: Redwood Bowl

1981 Far Western Conference football standings
	Conf.					Overall
Team	W		L		T	W		L		T
UC Davis +	4	–	1	–	0	6	–	4	–	0
Cal State Hayward +	4	–	1	–	0	6	–	4	–	1
Humboldt State	3	–	2	–	0	6	–	4	–	0
Chico State	3	–	2	–	0	5	–	5	–	0
Sacramento State	1	–	4	–	0	5	–	6	–	0
San Francisco State	0	–	5	–	0	3	–	7	–	0
+ – Conference co-champions

The 1981 Humboldt State Lumberjacks football team represented Humboldt State University—now known as California State Polytechnic University, Humboldt—as a member of the Far Western Conference (FWC) during the 1981 NCAA Division II football season. Led by 16th-year head coach Bud Van Deren, the Lumberjacks compiled an overall record of 6–4 with a mark of 3–2 in conference play, tying for third place in the FWC. The team outscored its opponents 204 to 198 for the season. Humboldt State played home games at the Redwood Bowl in Arcata, California.

== Schedule ==
Date	Opponent	Site	Result	Attendance	Source
September 12	at Southern Oregon*	Grants Pass, OR	L 24–27	4,100	
September 19	Cal Lutheran*	Redwood Bowl; Arcata, CA	W 34–28	1,500	
September 26	at Occidental*	D.W. Patterson Field; Los Angeles, CA	W 28–7	1,000–1,200	
October 3	Puget Sound*	Redwood Bowl; Arcata, CA	L 7–17	3,000	
October 10	UC Davis	Redwood Bowl; Arcata, CA	W 20–18	5,200	
October 17	at San Francisco State	Cox Stadium; San Francisco, CA	W 14–6	2,500	
October 24	Sonoma State*	Redwood Bowl; Arcata, CA	W 40–14	2,500	
October 31	at Chico State	University Stadium; Chico, CA	L 7–26	2,322–2,372	
November 7	at Cal State Hayward	Pioneer Stadium; Hayward, CA	L 7–36	2,000	
November 14	Sacramento State	Redwood Bowl; Arcata, CA	W 23–19	1,700–1,723	
*Non-conference game
