= 1984 San Francisco State Gators football team =

American college football season

1984 San Francisco State Gators football
- Conference: Northern California Athletic Conference
- Record: 1–8–1, 3 wins forfeited (1–4–1 NCAC, 1 win forfeited)
- Head coach: Vic Rowen (24th season)
- Home stadium: Cox Stadium

1984 Northern California Athletic Conference football standings
	Conf.					Overall
Team	W		L		T	W		L		T
No. T–6 UC Davis $^	6	–	0	–	0	9	–	2	–	0
Sacramento State	5	–	1	–	0	6	–	5	–	0
Cal State Hayward	4	–	2	–	0	7	–	3	–	0
Chico State	2	–	3	–	1	4	–	5	–	1
Sonoma State	2	–	4	–	0	2	–	8	–	0
San Francisco State	1	–	4	–	1	1	–	8	–	1
Humboldt State	0	–	6	–	0	0	–	10	–	0
$ – Conference champion; ^ – NCAA Division II playoff participant; San Francisco State forfeited 3 wins including 1 conference win over Sonoma State.; Rankings from NCAA Division II Football Committee poll

The 1984 San Francisco State Gators football team represented San Francisco State University as a member of the Northern California Athletic Conference (NCAC) during the 1983 NCAA Division II football season. Led by 24th-year head coach Vic Rowen, San Francisco State finished the season with an overall record of 4–5–1 and a mark of 2–3–1 in conference play, tying for fourth place in the NCAC. For the season the team was outscored by its opponents was outscored by 240 to 209. The Gators played home games at Cox Stadium in San Francisco.

On January 1, 1985, the NCAC announced it had ruled that San Francisco State had used two ineligible players and must forfeit three victories, two non-conference wins over Cal State Northridge and Azusa Pacific and one conference win over Sonoma State. With the three forfeits, the Gators' 1984 record fell to 1–8–1 overall and 1–4–1 in conference play, dropping them to sixth place in the NCAC.

== Schedule ==
Date	Opponent	Site	Result	Attendance	Source
September 8	at Cal Lutheran*	Mt. Clef Field; Thousand Oaks, CA	L 13–38	900	
September 22	Cal State Northridge*	Cox Stadium; San Francisco, CA	L 21–17 (forfeit loss)	1,000–1,021	
September 29	Azusa Pacific*	Cox Stadium; San Francisco, CA	L 41–21 (forfeit loss)	1,000–1,600	
October 6	at Cal State Hayward	Pioneer Stadium; Hayward, CA	L 23–43	800–2,000	
October 13	at Sonoma State	Cossacks Stadium; Rohnert Park, CA	L 45–21 (forfeit loss)	746–1,000	
October 20	No. 9 UC Davis	Cox Stadium; San Francisco, CA	L 7–21	2,000	
October 27	at Santa Clara*	Buck Shaw Stadium; Santa Clara, CA	L 6–12	2,131	
November 3	at Sacramento State	Hornet Stadium; Sacramento, CA	L 14–41	2,790	
November 10	Chico State	Cox Stadium; San Francisco, CA	T 14–14	250–712	
November 17	Humboldt State	Cox Stadium; San Francisco, CA	W 25–19	300–1,000	
*Non-conference game; Rankings from NCAA Division II Football Committee Poll released prior to the game
