= Virginia Union Panthers football =

Football program representing Virginia Union University

2024 Virginia Union Panthers football team
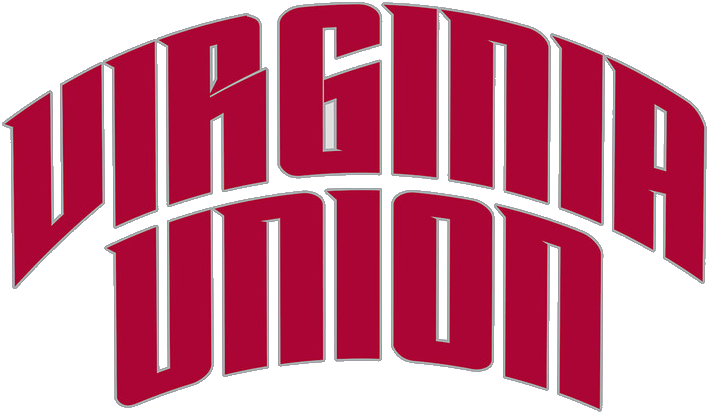
- First season: 1899; 127 years ago
- Athletic director: Joe Taylor
- Head coach: Alvin Parker; 6th season, 39–13 (.750)
- Location: Richmond, Virginia
- Stadium: Hovey Field (capacity: 10,000)
- NCAA division: Division II
- Conference: Central Intercollegiate Athletic Association
- Colors: Maroon and gray
- All-time record: 593–392–50 (.597)
- Bowl record: 0–2 (.000)

Conference championships
- 12 CIAA (1917, 1921, 1923, 1973, 1979, 1981–1983, 1986, 2001, 2023, 2024)
- Website: vuusports.com/football

The Virginia Union Panthers football program is the intercollegiate American football team for Virginia Union University located in the U.S. state of Virginia. The team competes at the NCAA Division II levels and are members of the Central Intercollegiate Athletic Association (CIAA). Virginia Union's first football team was fielded in 1899. The team plays its home games at the 10,000 seat Hovey Field in Richmond, Virginia.

== Conference affiliations ==
Virginia Union has played as both an independent and conference-affiliated team.

- Independent (1900–1911)
- Colored Intercollegiate Athletic Association / Central Intercollegiate Athletic Association (1912–present)

== Postseason appearances ==
=== NCAA Division II ===
The Panthers have made thirteen appearances in the NCAA Division II playoffs, with a combined record of 2–12. After ten consecutive losses, VUU won its first playoff game in 2024.

Year	Round	Opponent	Result
1979	First Round	Delaware	L, 28–58
1980	First Round	North Alabama	L, 8–17
1981	First Round	Shippensburg State	L, 27–40
1982	First Round	North Dakota State	L, 20–21
1983	First Round	North Alabama	L, 14–16
1986	First Round	Troy State	L, 7–31
1990	First Round	Edinboro	L, 14–38
1991	First Round	IUP	L, 7–56
2022	First Round	Wingate	L, 7–32
2023	First Round	Kutztown	L, 15–38
2024	First Round; Second Round; Quarterfinals	Wingate; Lenoir–Rhyne; Valdosta State	W, 34–31 ^{OT} W, 44–12; L, 14–49
2025	First Round	California (PA)	L, 24–27
2026	First Round	California (PA)	TBP

== Championships ==
=== Conference championships ===
The Panthers have won twelve conference championships, they had a championship-drought of 22 years between 2001 and their 2023 championship.

Year	Conference	Coach	Overall record	Conference record
1917	Colored Intercollegiate Athletic Association	Wesley A. Daniel	4–0	2–0
1921	Colored Intercollegiate Athletic Association	Harold D. Martin	6–0–2	3–0
1923	Colored Intercollegiate Athletic Association	Harold D. Martin	6–0–1	5–0
1973	Central Intercollegiate Athletic Association	Willard Bailey	9–1	9–0
1979	Central Intercollegiate Athletic Association	Willard Bailey	10–2	8–0
1981	Central Intercollegiate Athletic Association	Willard Bailey	11–1	7–0
1982	Central Intercollegiate Athletic Association	Willard Bailey	8–3	6–1
1983	Central Intercollegiate Athletic Association	Willard Bailey	9–2	6–1
1986	Central Intercollegiate Athletic Association	Joe Taylor	11–1	7–0
2001	Central Intercollegiate Athletic Association	Willard Bailey	8–3	5–1
2023	Central Intercollegiate Athletic Association	Alvin Parker	10–2	7–1
2024	Central Intercollegiate Athletic Association	Alvin Parker	10–4	7–1

=== Divisional championships ===
The Panthers have won eight division titles, in 1981 through 1983, 1986,1990, 1991 and 2023: Central Intercollegiate Athletic Association Northern Division and in 2001: Central Intercollegiate Athletic Association Eastern Division.

Year	Division championship	Opponent	Result										
1981	Central Intercollegiate Athletic Association Northern Division	North Carolina Central	W 45–7										
1982	Central Intercollegiate Athletic Association Northern Division	North Carolina Central	W 33–26										
1983	Central Intercollegiate Athletic Association Northern Division	Winston-Salem State	W 34–7										
1986	Central Intercollegiate Athletic Association Northern Division	Winston-Salem State	W 14–7	1999	Central Intercollegiate Athletic Association Eastern Division	Virginia State	2000	Central Intercollegiate Athletic Association Eastern Division	Virginia State	2001	Central Intercollegiate Athletic Association Eastern Division	Winston-Salem State	W 31–24
2023	Central Intercollegiate Athletic Association Northern Division	Fayetteville State	W 21–10										

== Notable former players ==
- Pete Hunter
- Mike Brim
- Malcolm Barnwell
- Tony Leonard
- Herbert Scott
- Bob Jones
- Cornelius Johnson
- Roger Anderson
- Brady Myers
- Curtis Allen
- Jada Byers
