= 1981 Cal Poly Pomona Broncos football team =

American college football season

1981 Cal Poly Pomona Broncos football
- Conference: California Collegiate Athletic Association
- Record: 4–7 (1–1 CCAA)
- Head coach: Roman Gabriel (2nd season)
- Home stadium: Kellogg Field

1981 California Collegiate Athletic Association football standings
	Conf.					Overall
Team	W		L		T	W		L		T
Cal State Northridge $	2	–	0	–	0	6	–	4	–	1
Cal Poly Pomona	1	–	1	–	0	4	–	7	–	0
Cal Poly	0	–	2	–	0	4	–	5	–	0
$ – Conference champion

The 1981 Cal Poly Pomona Broncos football team represented California State Polytechnic University, Pomona as a member of the California Collegiate Athletic Association (CCAA) during the 1981 NCAA Division II football season. Led by second-year head coach Roman Gabriel, Cal Poly Pomona compiled an overall record of 4–7 with a mark of 1–1 in conference play, placing second in the CCAA. The team was outscored by its opponents 236 to 175 for the season. The Broncos played home games at Kellogg Field in Pomona, California.

This was the last season for that the CCAA sponsored football. The Broncos played 13 seasons, from 1969 to 1981, in the conference. All three football members (Cal Poly Pomona, Cal Poly, and Cal State Northridge) moved their programs to the new Western Football Conference (WFC) in 1982.

== Schedule ==
Date	Opponent	Site	Result	Attendance	Source
September 5	Southern Utah State*	Kellogg Field; Pomona, CA	W 21–7	1,600	
September 12	San Francisco State*	Kellogg Field; Pomona, CA	L 10–15	1,300	
September 19	at Sacramento State*	Hornet Stadium; Sacramento, CA	W 14–7	4,810	
September 26	at Cal Poly	Mustang Stadium; San Luis Obispo, CA	W 35–21	6,504	
October 3	UC Davis*	Kellogg Field; Pomona, CA	L 7–19	4,113	
October 10	at Cal Lutheran*	Mt. Clef Field; Thousand Oaks, CA	L 10–32	2,000	
October 17	at Santa Clara*	Buck Shaw Stadium; Santa Clara, CA	L 13–28	4,023	
October 24	Cal State Hayward*	Kellogg Field; Pomona, CA	L 0–22	861	
October 31	Cal State Northridge	Kellogg Field; Pomona, CA	L 8–24	2,684	
November 7	Puget Sound*	Kellogg Field; Pomona, CA	L 22–28	2,233	
November 14	vs. Northern Arizona*	Sun Devil Stadium; Tempe, AZ	W 35–33	4,214	
*Non-conference game
