= 1984 Troy State Trojans football team =

American college football season

1984 Troy State Trojans football

NCAA Division II champion GSC champion

NCAA Division II Championship Game—Palm Bowl, W 18–17 vs. North Dakota State
- Conference: Gulf South Conference
- Record: 12–1 (7–1 GSC)
- Head coach: Chan Gailey (2nd season)
- Offensive coordinator: Jay Jefcoat (1st season)
- Offensive scheme: Wishbone
- Defensive coordinator: Rick Rhoades (2nd season)
- Base defense: 5–2
- Home stadium: Veterans Memorial Stadium

1984 Gulf South Conference football standings
	Conf.					Overall
Team	W		L		T	W		L		T
No. T–3 Troy State $^	7	–	1	–	0	12	–	1	–	0
No. 10 Mississippi College	5	–	2	–	1	6	–	2	–	1
North Alabama	4	–	1	–	3	7	–	1	–	3
Delta State	5	–	2	–	1	7	–	3	–	1
Jacksonville State	4	–	4	–	0	4	–	5	–	1
Livingston	3	–	5	–	0	5	–	5	–	0
Valdosta State	3	–	5	–	0	5	–	6	–	0
Tennessee–Martin	1	–	6	–	1	2	–	8	–	1
West Georgia	1	–	7	–	0	3	–	8	–	0
$ – Conference champion; ^ – NCAA Division II playoff participant; Rankings from NCAA Division II Football Committee poll

The 1984 Troy State Trojans football team represented Troy State University during the 1984 NCAA Division II football season, and completed the 64th season of Trojans football. The Trojans played their home games in at Veterans Memorial Stadium in Troy, Alabama. The 1984 team came off a 7–4 record from the previous season. The 1984 team was led by coach Chan Gailey. The team finished the regular season with a 9–1 record and made the NCAA Division II playoffs. The Trojans defeated the North Dakota State Bison 18–17 in the National Championship Game en route to the program's first NCAA Division II Football Championship and second overall national championship.

== Schedule ==
Date	Opponent	Rank	Site	TV	Result	Attendance	Source
September 8	Nicholls State*	No. 1	Veterans Memorial Stadium; Troy, AL		W 26–7	7,200	
September 15	vs. Florida A&M*	No. 1	Gator Bowl Stadium; Jacksonville, FL (Bold City Classic)		W 17–3	20,382–20,442	
September 22	Livingston	No. 1	Veterans Memorial Stadium; Troy, AL		W 35–26	7,583	
September 29	at West Georgia	No. 1	Grisham Stadium; Carrollton, GA		W 41–10	5,200	
October 6	Valdosta State	No. 2	Veterans Memorial Stadium; Troy, AL		W 27–12	7,500	
October 13	at No. 10 Mississippi College	No. 2	Robinson–Hale Stadium; Clinton, MS		W 14–7	4,000	
October 20	Delta State	No. 2	Veterans Memorial Stadium; Troy, AL		W 35–20	8,100	
October 27	at North Alabama	No. 2	Braly Municipal Stadium; Florence, AL		L 10–13	8,000	
November 3	Tennessee–Martin	No. 6	Veterans Memorial Stadium; Troy, AL		W 31–7	8,343	
November 10	at Jacksonville State	No. 3	Paul Snow Stadium; Jacksonville, AL (Battle for the Ol' School Bell)		W 42–39	4,000	
November 24	No. 3 Central State (OH)*	No. 3	Veterans Memorial Stadium; Troy, AL (NCAA Division II Quarterfinal)		W 31–21	6,599	
December 1	No. 8 Towson State*	No. 3	Veterans Memorial Stadium; Troy, AL (NCAA Division II Semifinal)		W 45–3		
December 8	vs. No. 1 North Dakota State*	No. 3	McAllen Stadium; McAllen, TX (NCAA Division II Championship Game—Palm Bowl)	ESPN	W 18–17		
*Non-conference game; Rankings from NCAA Division II Football Committee Poll released prior to the game

== The National Championship Game ==
The title game between Troy and North Dakota State proved to be a good one, as it pitted the #3-ranked team against the #1-ranked team. The game was shown nationally on ESPN.

The game was close throughout, with both teams playing good defense in a low-scoring affair. Troy State trailed 17-15 late in the contest and, with 1:30 remaining in the game, Carey Christensen returned to lead the Trojans on their final drive to try and win the game. Starting from its own 10-yard line, Troy State eventually reached the NDSU 32 yard-line. With the clock running and the Trojans out of time-outs, the Trojans and freshman kicker Ted Clem took the field with :08 seconds remaining on the clock as it was ticking down. Just as time was about to expire, the Trojans got the snap off, and Ted Clem hit a 50-yard field goal to give Troy the lead and the win over North Dakota State.
