= 1981 Southwest Texas State Bobcats football team =

American college football season

1981 Southwest Texas State Bobcats football

NCAA Division II champion LSC champion

NCAA Division II Championship Game, W 42–13 vs. North Dakota State
- Conference: Lone Star Conference
- Record: 13–1 (6–1 LSC)
- Head coach: Jim Wacker (3rd season)
- Offensive scheme: I formation
- Defensive coordinator: Tom Mueller (3rd season)
- Base defense: 5–2
- Home stadium: Bobcat Stadium

1981 Lone Star Conference football standings
	Conf.					Overall
Team	W		L		T	W		L		T
No. 4 Southwest Texas State $^	6	–	1	–	0	13	–	1	–	0
No. 9 Texas A&I	5	–	2	–	0	9	–	2	–	0
Abilene Christian	5	–	2	–	0	8	–	2	–	0
Angelo State	5	–	2	–	0	8	–	3	–	0
No. 17 East Texas State	4	–	3	–	0	7	–	4	–	0
Sam Houston State	2	–	5	–	0	3	–	7	–	0
Howard Payne	1	–	6	–	0	3	–	7	–	0
Stephen F. Austin	0	–	7	–	0	1	–	10	–	0
$ – Conference champion; ^ – NCAA Division II playoff participant; Rankings from NCAA Division II Football Committee poll for Southwest Texas State and Texas A&I and NAIA Division I poll for East Texas State

The 1981 Southwest Texas State Bobcats football team was an American football team that represented Southwest Texas State University—now known as Texas State University–as a member of the Lone Star Conference (LSC) during the 1981 NCAA Division II football season. The Bobcats played their home games at the newly opened Bobcat Stadium in San Marcos, Texas. Led by third-year head coach Jim Wacker, Southwest Texas State compiled an overall record of 13–1 and claimed the LSC title with a conference mark of 6–1. They won the NCAA Division II Football Championship with a win over North Dakota State, 42–13, in the Palm Bowl.

== Schedule ==
Date	Opponent	Rank	Site	Result	Attendance	Source
September 5	Prairie View A&M*		Bobcat Stadium; San Marcos, TX	W 56–0	8,500	
September 12	at Texas Lutheran*		Bulldog Stadium; Seguin, TX	W 59–0	7,000	
September 19	Southeastern Louisiana*		Bobcat Stadium; San Marcos, TX	W 35–10	10,000	
September 26	at Lamar*	No. 3	Cardinal Stadium; Beaumont, TX	W 24–7	17,050	
October 10	at Howard Payne	No. 1	Gordon Wood Stadium; Brownwood, TX	W 41–0	3,500	
October 17	Sam Houston State	No. 1	Bobcat Stadium; San Marcos, TX (rivalry)	W 38–14	11,211	
October 24	at Stephen F. Austin	No. 1	Lumberjack Stadium; Nacogdoches, TX	W 38–6	12,137	
October 31	East Texas State	No. 1	Bobcat Stadium; San Marcos, TX	W 38–7	10,000–10,899	
November 7	at Angelo State	No. 1	San Angelo Stadium; San Angelo, TX	W 31–7	13,000	
November 14	at No. T–10 Abilene Christian	No. 1	Shotwell Stadium; Abilene, TX	W 38–31	13,000	
November 21	Texas A&I	No. 1	Bobcat Stadium; San Marcos, TX	L 14–21	17,600	
November 28	No. 5 Jacksonville State*	No. 4	Bobcat Stadium; San Marcos, TX (NCAA Division II Quarterfinal)	W 38–22		
December 5	No. 1 Northern Michigan*	No. 4	Bobcat Stadium; San Marcos, TX (NCAA Division II Semifinal)	W 62–0		
December 12	vs. No. 6 North Dakota State*	No. 4	McAllen Veterans Memorial Stadium; McAllen, TX (NCAA Division II Championship—Palm Bowl)	W 42–13	9,415	
*Non-conference game; Rankings from NCAA Division II Football Committee Poll released prior to the game

== Game summaries ==
=== Vs. No. 6 North Dakota State (NCAA Division II Championship) ===
	1	2	3	4	Total
No. 6 Bison	7	6	0	0	13
No. 4 Bobcats	0	14	14	14	42
