= 1981 North Dakota State Bison football team =

American college football season

1981 North Dakota State Bison football

NCC champion

NCAA Division II Championship Game, L 13–42 vs. Southwest Texas State
- Conference: North Central Conference
- Record: 10–3 (7–0 NCC)
- Head coach: Don Morton (3rd season)
- Defensive coordinator: Mike Daly (3rd season)
- Home stadium: Dacotah Field

1981 North Central Conference football standings
	Conf.					Overall
Team	W		L		T	W		L		T
No. 6 North Dakota State $^	7	–	0	–	0	10	–	3	–	0
North Dakota	4	–	3	–	0	6	–	4	–	0
Northern Colorado	4	–	3	–	0	5	–	4	–	0
South Dakota *	3	–	3	–	1	5	–	6	–	0
Nebraska–Omaha	3	–	4	–	0	5	–	6	–	0
South Dakota State *	2	–	4	–	1	4	–	6	–	0
Morningside	2	–	5	–	0	5	–	6	–	0
Augustana (SD)	2	–	5	–	0	3	–	7	–	0
+ – Conference co-champions; ^ – NCAA Division II playoff participant; * – South Dakota and South Dakota State split two head-to-head games, which counted as a tie for each team in the conference standings.; Rankings from AP Poll

The 1981 North Dakota State Bison football team was an American football team that represented North Dakota State University during the 1981 NCAA Division II football season as a member of the North Central Conference. In their third year under head coach Don Morton, the team compiled a 10–3 record, finished as NCC champion, and lost to Southwest Texas State in the NCAA Division II Championship Game.

== Schedule ==
Date	Opponent	Rank	Site	Result	Attendance	Source
September 5	at Northern Michigan*		Memorial Field; Marquette, MI	L 0–38	5,806	
September 12	at Northern Arizona*		NAU Skydome; Flagstaff, AZ	L 17–23	11,750	
September 19	at Northern Colorado		Jackson Field; Greeley, CO	W 17–7	1,987	
September 26	No. 1 North Dakota		Dacotah Field; Fargo, ND (Nickel Trophy)	W 31–7	14,100	
October 3	at Morningside		Elwood Olsen Stadium; Sioux City, IA	W 34–0	3,000	
October 10	South Dakota State		Dacotah Field; Fargo, ND (rivalry)	W 49–24	7,600	
October 17	Augustana (SD)		Dacotah Field; Fargo, ND	W 21–14	9,250	
October 24	at South Dakota	No. 10	DakotaDome; Vermillion, SD	W 43–7	6,800	
October 31	Nebraska–Omaha	No. 9	Dacotah Field; Fargo, ND	W 14–0	7,350	
November 7	Simon Fraser*	No. 8	Dacotah Field; Fargo, ND	W 42–7	3,600	
November 28	at No. 3 Puget Sound*	No. 6	Highline Stadium; Burien, WA (NCAA Division II Quarterfinal)	W 24–10	4,500	
December 5	at No. 8 Shippensburg*	No. 6	Seth Grove Stadium; Shippensburg, PA (NCAA Division II Semifinal)	W 18–6	7,400	
December 12	vs. No. 4 Southwest Texas State*	No. 6	McAllen Veterans Memorial Stadium; McAllen, TX (NCAA Division II Championship Game—Palm Bowl)	L 13–42	9,415	
*Non-conference game; Rankings from NCAA Division II Football Committee Poll released prior to the game
