= 1981 Cal State Northridge Matadors football team =

American college football season

1981 Cal State Northridge Matadors football

CCAA champion
- Conference: California Collegiate Athletic Association
- Record: 6–4–1 (2–0 CCAA)
- Head coach: Tom Keele (3rd season)
- Home stadium: North Campus Stadium

1981 California Collegiate Athletic Association football standings
	Conf.					Overall
Team	W		L		T	W		L		T
Cal State Northridge $	2	–	0	–	0	6	–	4	–	1
Cal Poly Pomona	1	–	1	–	0	4	–	7	–	0
Cal Poly	0	–	2	–	0	4	–	5	–	0
$ – Conference champion

The 1981 Cal State Northridge Matadors football team represented California State University, Northridge as a member of the California Collegiate Athletic Association (CCAA) during the 1981 NCAA Division II football season. Led by third-year head coach Tom Keele, Cal State Northridge compiled an overall record of 6–4–1 with a mark of 2–0 in conference play, winning the CCAA for the first and only time in program history. The team outscored its opponents 203 to 174 for the season. The Matadors played home games at North Campus Stadium in Northridge, California.

1981 was the last season for CCAA football. All three 1981 football members of the CCAA (Cal State Northridge, Cal Poly Pomona, and Cal Poly) moved to the new Western Football Conference for the 1982 season.

== Schedule ==
Date	Opponent	Rank	Site	Result	Attendance	Source
September 12	Cal State Hayward*		North Campus Stadium; Northridge, CA	T 7–7	2,000	
September 19	San Francisco State*		North Campus Stadium; Northridge, CA	W 17–14	1,500	
September 26	at UC Davis*		Toomey Field; Davis, CA	W 20–17	7,700–8,000	
October 3	Santa Clara*		North Campus Stadium; Northridge, CA	W 27–14	2,753	
October 10	Chico State*	No. 9	North Campus Stadium; Northridge, CA	W 38–16	584	
October 17	at Puget Sound*	No. 9	Baker Stadium; Tacoma, WA	L 7–24	5,000	
October 24	Cal Lutheran*		North Campus Stadium; Northridge, CA	L 0–10	5,619	
October 31	at Cal Poly Pomona		Kellogg Field; Pomona, CA	W 24–8	2,684	
November 7	at Sacramento State*		Hornet Stadium; Sacramento, CA	L 20–33	2,503	
November 14	at Portland State*		Civic Stadium; Portland, OR	L 13–17	2,000	
November 21	Cal Poly		North Campus Stadium; Northridge, CA	W 30–14	2,467	
*Non-conference game; Rankings from Associated Press Poll released prior to the game
