= 1984 NCAA Division II football season =

American college football season

- Regular season: August – November 1984
- Playoffs: December 1984
- National Championship: Palm Bowl; Veterans Stadium; McAllen, TX
- Champion: Troy State

The 1984 NCAA Division II football season, part of college football in the United States organized by the National Collegiate Athletic Association at the Division II level, began in August 1984, and concluded with the NCAA Division II Football Championship on December 8, 1984, at McAllen Veterans Memorial Stadium in McAllen, Texas. During the game's five-year stretch in McAllen, the "City of Palms", it was referred to as the Palm Bowl.

Troy State defeated North Dakota State in the championship game, 18–17, to win their first Division II national title.

== Conference changes and new programs ==
- Four programs departed Division II for Division I-AA prior to the season. Three were members of the Lone Star Conference, invited to join the newly formed, Division I-AA Gulf Star Conference.

School	1983 Conference	1984 Conference
Eastern Washington	D-II Independent	I-AA Independent
Cal Lutheran	NAIA Division II Independent	Western Football Conference
Sam Houston State	Lone Star	Gulf Star (I-AA)
Southwest Texas State	Lone Star	Gulf Star (I-AA)
Stephen F. Austin	Lone Star	Gulf Star (I-AA)

== Conference standings ==
1984 Central Intercollegiate Athletic Association football standings
	Conf.					Overall
Team	W		L		T	W		L		T
Northern
No. T–6 Norfolk State xy$^	6	–	1	–	0	10	–	2	–	0
Hampton	4	–	2	–	1	5	–	3	–	2
Virginia State	4	–	3	–	0	5	–	5	–	0
Virginia Union	3	–	3	–	1	5	–	3	–	2
Elizabeth City State	2	–	4	–	1	4	–	5	–	1
Saint Paul's (VA)	0	–	7	–	0	3	–	7	–	0
Southern
Winston-Salem State xy	7	–	0	–	0	9	–	2	–	0
North Carolina Central	5	–	2	–	0	7	–	3	–	0
Fayetteville State	3	–	3	–	1	4	–	4	–	1
Johnson C. Smith	3	–	4	–	0	3	–	7	–	0
Livingstone	2	–	5	–	0	3	–	7	–	0
Bowie State	0	–	7	–	0	0	–	10	–	1
Championship: Norfolk State 20, Winston-Salem State 19
$ – Conference champion; x – Division champion/co-champions; y – Championship game participant; ^ – NCAA Division II playoff participant; Rankings from NCAA Division II Football Committee poll

1984 Great Lakes Intercollegiate Athletic Conference football standings
	Conf.					Overall
Team	W		L		T	W		L		T
No. 6 Saginaw Valley State $^	6	–	0	–	0	8	–	3	–	0
No. 17 Northwood	5	–	1	–	0	6	–	3	–	0
Wayne State (MI)	4	–	2	–	0	6	–	5	–	0
Hillsdale	3	–	3	–	0	6	–	4	–	0
Michigan Tech	2	–	4	–	0	4	–	6	–	0
Ferris State	1	–	5	–	0	2	–	8	–	0
Grand Valley State	0	–	6	–	0	0	–	10	–	0
$ – Conference champion; ^ – NAIA Division I playoff participant; Rankings from NAIA Division I poll

1984 Gulf South Conference football standings
	Conf.					Overall
Team	W		L		T	W		L		T
No. T–3 Troy State $^	7	–	1	–	0	12	–	1	–	0
No. 10 Mississippi College	5	–	2	–	1	6	–	2	–	1
North Alabama	4	–	1	–	3	7	–	1	–	3
Delta State	5	–	2	–	1	7	–	3	–	1
Jacksonville State	4	–	4	–	0	4	–	5	–	1
Livingston	3	–	5	–	0	5	–	5	–	0
Valdosta State	3	–	5	–	0	5	–	6	–	0
Tennessee–Martin	1	–	6	–	1	2	–	8	–	1
West Georgia	1	–	7	–	0	3	–	8	–	0
$ – Conference champion; ^ – NCAA Division II playoff participant; Rankings from NCAA Division II Football Committee poll

1984 Heartland Collegiate Conference standings
	Conf.					Overall
Team	W		L		T	W		L		T
Ashland $	5	–	0	–	1	6	–	3	–	1
Indiana Central	4	–	2	–	0	8	–	2	–	0
Butler	4	–	2	–	0	6	–	4	–	0
Franklin (IN)	3	–	2	–	1	5	–	4	–	1
Valparaiso	2	–	4	–	0	6	–	4	–	0
Saint Joseph's (IN)	1	–	5	–	0	2	–	7	–	0
Evansville	1	–	5	–	0	2	–	8	–	0
$ – Conference champion

1984 Lone Star Conference football standings
	Conf.					Overall
Team	W		L		T	W		L		T
No. 10 Angelo State $	4	–	0	–	0	8	–	3	–	0
Texas A&I	3	–	1	–	0	6	–	5	–	0
Abilene Christian	2	–	2	–	0	3	–	7	–	0
East Texas State	1	–	3	–	0	5	–	5	–	0
Howard Payne	0	–	4	–	0	1	–	8	–	1
$ – Conference champion; Rankings from NCAA Division II Football Committee poll

1984 Missouri Intercollegiate Athletic Association football standings
	Conf.					Overall
Team	W		L		T	W		L		T
No. 5 NW Missouri State $^	5	–	0	–	0	10	–	2	–	0
Central Missouri State	4	–	1	–	0	5	–	6	–	0
NE Missouri State	3	–	2	–	0	4	–	7	–	0
Missouri–Rolla	2	–	3	–	0	6	–	4	–	0
SE Missouri State	1	–	4	–	0	1	–	10	–	0
Lincoln (MO)	0	–	5	–	0	0	–	10	–	1
$ – Conference champion; ^ – NCAA Division II playoff participant; Rankings from NCAA Division II Football Committee poll

1984 North Central Conference football standings
	Conf.					Overall
Team	W		L		T	W		L		T
No. 1 North Dakota State +^	8	–	1	–	0	11	–	2	–	0
No. 2 Nebraska–Omaha +^	8	–	1	–	0	11	–	2	–	0
South Dakota	7	–	2	–	0	8	–	3	–	0
North Dakota	6	–	3	–	0	8	–	3	–	0
Morningside	5	–	4	–	0	6	–	5	–	0
Mankato State	3	–	6	–	0	4	–	7	–	0
Northern Colorado	3	–	6	–	0	3	–	8	–	0
St. Cloud State	2	–	7	–	0	4	–	7	–	0
South Dakota State	2	–	7	–	0	3	–	8	–	0
Augustana (SD)	0	–	9	–	0	1	–	10	–	0
+ – Conference co-champions; ^ – NCAA Division II playoff participant; Rankings from NCAA Division II Football Committee poll

1984 Northern California Athletic Conference football standings
	Conf.					Overall
Team	W		L		T	W		L		T
No. T–6 UC Davis $^	6	–	0	–	0	9	–	2	–	0
Sacramento State	5	–	1	–	0	6	–	5	–	0
Cal State Hayward	4	–	2	–	0	7	–	3	–	0
Chico State	2	–	3	–	1	4	–	5	–	1
Sonoma State	2	–	4	–	0	2	–	8	–	0
San Francisco State	1	–	4	–	1	1	–	8	–	1
Humboldt State	0	–	6	–	0	0	–	10	–	0
$ – Conference champion; ^ – NCAA Division II playoff participant; San Francisco State forfeited 3 wins including 1 conference win over Sonoma State.; Rankings from NCAA Division II Football Committee poll

1984 Northern Intercollegiate Conference football standings
	Conf.					Overall
Team	W		L		T	W		L		T
No. 8 Moorhead State +^	5	–	1	–	0	8	–	3	–	0
Minnesota Morris +	5	–	1	–	0	5	–	4	–	0
No. 14 Bemidji State	4	–	2	–	0	8	–	3	–	0
Minnesota Duluth	4	–	2	–	0	6	–	4	–	0
Winona State	2	–	4	–	0	3	–	7	–	0
Northern State	1	–	5	–	0	3	–	7	–	0
Southwest State (MN)	0	–	6	–	0	3	–	7	–	0
+ – Conference co-champions; ^ – NAIA Division I playoff participant; Rankings from NAIA Division I poll

1984 Pennsylvania State Athletic Conference football standings
	Conf.					Overall
Team	W		L		T	W		L		T
East Division
West Chester y	5	–	1	–	0	7	–	3	–	0
Bloomsburg xy	5	–	1	–	0	6	–	5	–	0
Millersville	4	–	1	–	1	6	–	3	–	1
East Stroudsburg	3	–	3	–	0	5	–	6	–	0
Kutztown	1	–	4	–	1	2	–	7	–	1
Cheyney	1	–	5	–	0	3	–	7	–	0
Mansfield	0	–	4	–	2	2	–	6	–	2
West Division
Edinboro x	4	–	2	–	0	8	–	2	–	0
California (PA) xy$	4	–	2	–	0	8	–	3	–	0
Clarion x	4	–	2	–	0	7	–	3	–	0
IUP x	4	–	2	–	0	7	–	3	–	0
Slippery Rock	3	–	3	–	0	6	–	4	–	0
Shippensburg	1	–	5	–	0	4	–	6	–	0
Lock Haven	1	–	5	–	0	1	–	9	–	0
Championship: California 21, Bloomsburg 14
$ – Conference champion; x – Division champion/co-champions; y – Championship game participant

1984 Western Football Conference standings
	Conf.					Overall
Team	W		L		T	W		L		T
Portland State $	3	–	0	–	0	8	–	3	–	0
Cal Poly	2	–	1	–	0	6	–	4	–	0
Santa Clara	1	–	2	–	0	7	–	4	–	0
Cal State Northridge	0	–	3	–	0	3	–	7	–	0
Cal Lutheran *	0	–	0	–	0	5	–	4	–	1
$ – Conference champion; * – Ineligible for conference title

1984 Southern Intercollegiate Athletic Conference football standings
	Conf.					Overall
Team	W		L		T	W		L		T
Division II
Albany State x	7	–	1	–	0	7	–	2	–	0
Morris Brown	5	–	1	–	1	5	–	4	–	1
Fort Valley State	5	–	2	–	0	8	–	3	–	0
Morehouse	5	–	4	–	1	5	–	4	–	1
Alabama A&M	4	–	2	–	1	5	–	4	–	2
Clark	2	–	6	–	0	2	–	7	–	0
Savannah State	1	–	5	–	1	2	–	7	–	1
Tuskegee	1	–	7	–	0	1	–	8	–	0
Division III
Miles x	1	–	2	–	1	5	–	3	–	1
Knoxville	1	–	2	–	1	4	–	3	–	1
Lane	1	–	3	–	0	2	–	6	–	0
x – Division champion/co-champions; Rankings from AP Poll

1984 NCAA Division II independents football records
	Conf.			Overall
Team	W	L	T	W		L		T
No. T–3 Central State (OH) ^		–		9	–	2	–	0
No. 8 Towson State ^		–		9	–	4	–	0
Southern Connecticut State		–		7	–	3	–	0
Central Connecticut		–		6	–	4	–	0
Northern Michigan		–		6	–	4	–	0
New Haven		–		5	–	5	–	0
Liberty		–		5	–	6	–	0
Saint Mary's		–		5	–	6	–	0
American International		–		4	–	6	–	0
Springfield		–		3	–	7	–	0
Kentucky State		–		2	–	9	–	0
UCF		–		2	–	9	–	0
^ – NCAA Division II playoff participant; Rankings from NCAA Division II Football Committee poll

== Conference summaries ==
Conference Champions

Central Intercollegiate Athletic Association – Norfolk State
Great Lakes Intercollegiate Athletic Conference – Saginaw Valley State
Gulf South Conference – Troy State
Heartland Collegiate Conference – Ashland
Lone Star Conference – Angelo State
Missouri Intercollegiate Athletic Association – Northwest Missouri State
North Central Conference – Nebraska–Omaha and North Dakota State
Northern California Athletic Conference – UC Davis
Northern Intercollegiate Conference – Minnesota–Morris and Minnesota State–Moorhead
Pennsylvania State Athletic Conference – California (PA)
Rocky Mountain Athletic Conference – Fort Lewis
South Atlantic Conference – Carson-Newman
Southern Intercollegiate Athletic Conference – Albany State

== Postseason ==
1984 NCAA Division II Football Championship
- Teams: 8
- Finals Site: Veterans Stadium; McAllen, TX
- Champion: Troy State; (1st title, 1st title game)
- Runner-up: North Dakota State; (3rd title game)
- Semifinalists: Nebraska–Omaha; Towson State
- Winning coach: Chan Gailey; 1st championship

The 1984 NCAA Division II Football Championship playoffs were the 12th single-elimination tournament to determine the national champion of men's NCAA Division II college football. The championship game was held at McAllen Veterans Memorial Stadium in McAllen, Texas, for the fourth consecutive time.

=== Playoff bracket ===
First round Campus sites
North Dakota State	31
UC Davis	25
Nebraska–Omaha	28
Northwest Missouri State	15
Troy State	31
Central State (OH)	21
Towson State	31
Norfolk State	21

Semifinals; Campus sites
North Dakota State	25
Nebraska–Omaha	14
Troy State	45
Towson State	3

Championship; McAllen Veterans Memorial Stadium; McAllen, TX
North Dakota State	17
Troy State	18

== See also ==
- 1984 NCAA Division I-A football season
- 1984 NCAA Division I-AA football season
- 1984 NCAA Division III football season
- 1984 NAIA Division I football season
- 1984 NAIA Division II football season
