= 1981 UC Davis Aggies football team =

American college football season

1981 UC Davis Aggies football

FWC co-champion
- Conference: Far Western Conference
- Record: 6–4 (4–1 FWC)
- Head coach: Jim Sochor (12th season)
- Home stadium: Toomey Field

1981 Far Western Conference football standings
	Conf.					Overall
Team	W		L		T	W		L		T
UC Davis +	4	–	1	–	0	6	–	4	–	0
Cal State Hayward +	4	–	1	–	0	6	–	4	–	1
Humboldt State	3	–	2	–	0	6	–	4	–	0
Chico State	3	–	2	–	0	5	–	5	–	0
Sacramento State	1	–	4	–	0	5	–	6	–	0
San Francisco State	0	–	5	–	0	3	–	7	–	0
+ – Conference co-champions

The 1981 UC Davis Aggies football team represented the University of California, Davis as a member of the Far Western Conference (FWC) during the 1981 NCAA Division II football season. Led by 12th-year head coach Jim Sochor, UC Davis compiled an overall record of 6–4 with a mark of 4–1 in conference play, sharing the FWC title with Cal State Hayward. The Aggies were conference champions for the 11th consecutive season and had a winning record for the 12th straight year. UC Davis' loss to Humboldt State on October 10 broke a streak of 38 consecutive conference victories that started in the 1973 season. The team outscored its opponents 163 to 140 for the season. The Aggies played home games at Toomey Field in Davis, California.

== Schedule ==
Date	Opponent	Site	Result	Attendance	Source
September 19	Puget Sound*	Toomey Field; Davis, CA	L 0–7	7,300	
September 26	Cal State Northridge*	Toomey Field; Davis, CA	L 17–20	7,700–8,000	
October 3	at Cal Poly Pomona*	Kellogg Field; Pomona, CA	W 19–7	4,113	
October 10	at Humboldt State	Redwood Bowl; Arcata, CA	L 18–20	5,200	
October 17	at Cal Poly*	Mustang Stadium; San Luis Obispo, CA (rivalry)	L 0–30	4,356	
October 24	San Francisco State	Toomey Field; Davis, CA	W 6–3	7,000	
October 31	at Santa Clara*	Buck Shaw Stadium; Santa Clara, CA	W 21–17	6,154	
November 7	Chico State	Toomey Field; Davis, CA	W 38–9	6,412–6,500	
November 14	at Cal State Hayward	Pioneer Stadium; Hayward, CA	W 23–14	1,500	
November 21	Sacramento State	Toomey Field; Davis, CA (rivalry)	W 21–13	5,600	
*Non-conference game
