= Hovey Field =

Stadium in Richmond, Virginia

Coordinates: 37.560970°N 77.449064°W

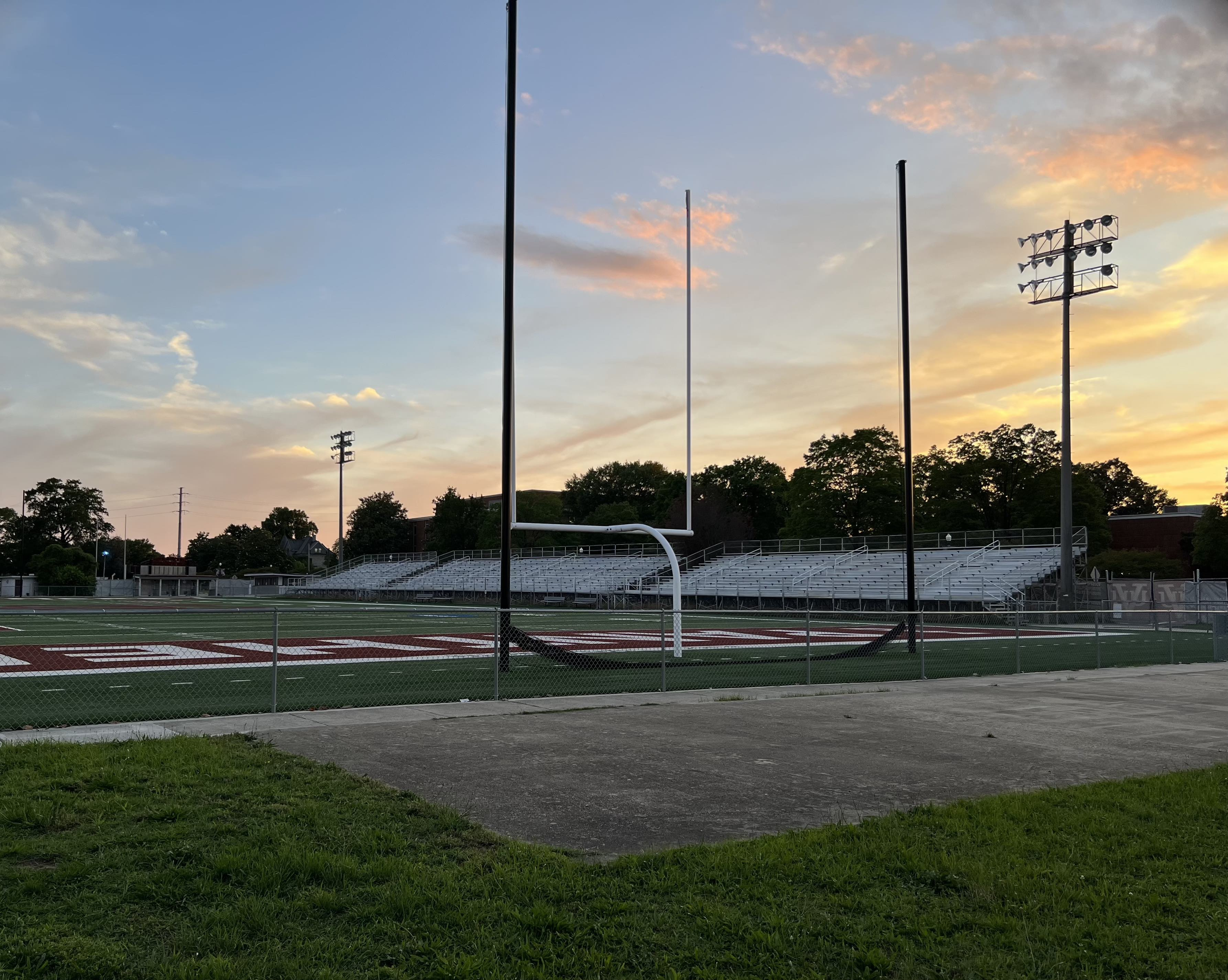
Hovey Field at sunset in 2025

Hovey Field is a stadium in Richmond, Virginia. It is primarily used for American football, and is the home field of the Virginia Union Panthers. Historic Hovey Field has been the home to Virginia Union University football since 1907. On land originally purchased for just over $8,000, Hovey Field has become a VUU landmark. Hovey Field seats over 10,000 people and was the home to the 1923 VUU National Championship football team.

Hovey Field, used by Virginia Union University since 1907, is the second-oldest college football stadium still in use in the United States. Hovey Field was the oldest natural grass football stadium in the country until the natural grass had been replaced with turf in 2020. Harvard Stadium, built in 1903, is the only older college football stadium still in use. Virginia Union also shut out Lincoln University's football team 90–0 in October 2018.
