= 1981 NCAA Division II football season =

American college football season

- Regular season: August – November 1981
- Playoffs: December 1981
- National Championship: Palm Bowl; Veterans Stadium; McAllen, TX
- Champion: Southwest Texas State

The 1981 NCAA Division II football season, part of college football in the United States organized by the National Collegiate Athletic Association at the Division II level, began in August 1981, and concluded with the NCAA Division II Football Championship on December 12, 1981, at McAllen Veterans Memorial Stadium in McAllen, Texas. During the game's five-year stretch in McAllen, the "City of Palms", it was referred to as the Palm Bowl.

Southwest Texas State defeated North Dakota State in the championship game, 42–13, to win their first Division II national title.

== Conference realignment ==
=== Conference changes ===
- Prior to the 1981 season, the Mid-Continent Conference was shifted from Division II to Division I-AA; its four members, Eastern Illinois, Northern Iowa, Western Illinois, and Southwest Missouri State (now Missouri State), all made the transition. Northern Michigan and Youngstown State, who had been members of the Mid-Continent the previous season, departed the league before the shift. NMU remained in Division II while YSU departed for the Ohio Valley Conference in Division I-AA.
- After spending 1980 as a club team, Sonoma State University officially joined Division II this year.
- Four Members of the Lone Star Conference- Texas A&I, Angelo State, Abilene Christian, and Southwest Texas State- reclassified to Division II from the NAIA this year. The remaining members of the conference remained in the NAIA.

=== Membership changes ===
School	1980 Conference	1981 Conference
Abilene Christian	Lone Star (NAIA)	Lone Star (D-II)
Angelo State	Lone Star (NAIA)	Lone Star (D-II)
Eastern Washington	Evergreen (NAIA)	D-II Independent
Liberty	NAIA Independent	D-II Independent
Mankato State	Northern	Independent
Northern Michigan	Mid-Continent	D-II Independent
Portland State	I-AA Independent	D-II Independent
Southwest Missouri State	MIAA	Mid-Continent (I-AA)
New Haven	NEFC (D-III)	D-II Independent
Sonoma State	Club Team	Independent
St. Mary's	D-III Independent	D-II Independent
Southwest Texas State	Lone Star (NAIA)	Lone Star (D-II)
St. Cloud State	Northern	Independent
Texas A&I	Lone Star (NAIA)	Lone Star (D-II)
Youngstown State	Mid-Continent (D-II)	Ohio Valley (I-AA)

== Conference standings ==
1981 California Collegiate Athletic Association football standings
	Conf.					Overall
Team	W		L		T	W		L		T
Cal State Northridge $	2	–	0	–	0	6	–	4	–	1
Cal Poly Pomona	1	–	1	–	0	4	–	7	–	0
Cal Poly	0	–	2	–	0	4	–	5	–	0
$ – Conference champion

1981 Central Intercollegiate Athletic Association football standings
	Conf.					Overall
Team	W		L		T	W		L		T
Northern
No. 2 Virginia Union xy$^	7	–	0	–	0	11	–	1	–	0
Elizabeth City State ^	6	–	1	–	0	8	–	3	–	0
No. 10 Hampton	5	–	2	–	0	8	–	2	–	0
Norfolk State	3	–	4	–	0	4	–	5	–	1
Virginia State	3	–	4	–	0	4	–	6	–	0
Saint Paul's (VA)	0	–	7	–	0	0	–	10	–	0
Southern
North Carolina Central xy	6	–	1	–	0	7	–	4	–	0
Winston-Salem State	4	–	3	–	0	5	–	5	–	0
Johnson C. Smith	3	–	4	–	0	4	–	6	–	0
Fayetteville State	2	–	5	–	0	3	–	5	–	0
Livingstone	1	–	6	–	0	3	–	7	–	0
Bowie State *	2	–	5	–	0	5	–	5	–	0
Championship: Virginia Union 45, North Carolina Central 7
$ – Conference champion; x – Division champion/co-champions; y – Championship game participant; ^ – NCAA Division II playoff participant; * – ineligible for conference title; Rankings from NCAA Division II Football Committee poll for Virginia Union and NAIA Division I poll for Hampton

1981 Far Western Conference football standings
	Conf.					Overall
Team	W		L		T	W		L		T
UC Davis +	4	–	1	–	0	6	–	4	–	0
Cal State Hayward +	4	–	1	–	0	6	–	4	–	1
Humboldt State	3	–	2	–	0	6	–	4	–	0
Chico State	3	–	2	–	0	5	–	5	–	0
Sacramento State	1	–	4	–	0	5	–	6	–	0
San Francisco State	0	–	5	–	0	3	–	7	–	0
+ – Conference co-champions

1981 Great Lakes Intercollegiate Athletic Conference football standings
	Conf.					Overall
Team	W		L		T	W		L		T
Grand Valley State $	6	–	0	–	0	7	–	2	–	0
No. 3 Hillsdale ^	5	–	1	–	0	10	–	2	–	0
Ferris State	3	–	3	–	0	4	–	4	–	0
Wayne State (MI)	3	–	3	–	0	4	–	5	–	0
Northwood	2	–	4	–	0	4	–	6	–	0
Saginaw Valley State	2	–	4	–	0	3	–	7	–	0
Michigan Tech	0	–	6	–	0	1	–	8	–	0
$ – Conference champion; ^ – NAIA Division I playoff participant; Rankings from NAIA Division I poll

1981 Gulf South Conference football standings
	Conf.					Overall
Team	W		L		T	W		L		T
No. 5 Jacksonville State $^	6	–	0	–	0	8	–	3	–	0
No. T–10 North Alabama	4	–	2	–	0	8	–	2	–	0
Livingston	4	–	2	–	0	6	–	3	–	0
Mississippi College	3	–	3	–	0	6	–	4	–	0
Tennessee–Martin	3	–	3	–	0	4	–	7	–	0
Troy State	1	–	5	–	0	3	–	7	–	0
Delta State	0	–	6	–	0	3	–	7	–	0
$ – Conference champion; ^ – NCAA Division II playoff participant; Rankings from NCAA Division II Football Committee poll

1981 Heartland Collegiate Conference standings
	Conf.					Overall
Team	W		L		T	W		L		T
Franklin (IN) +	6	–	1	–	0	8	–	2	–	0
Indiana Central +	6	–	1	–	0	7	–	4	–	0
Saint Joseph's (IN)	5	–	2	–	0	6	–	3	–	0
Ashland	5	–	2	–	0	6	–	4	–	0
Butler	2	–	5	–	0	3	–	7	–	0
Evansville	2	–	5	–	0	3	–	8	–	0
Georgetown (KY)	1	–	6	–	0	1	–	9	–	0
Valparaiso	1	–	6	–	0	1	–	9	–	0
+ – Conference co-champions

1981 Lone Star Conference football standings
	Conf.					Overall
Team	W		L		T	W		L		T
No. 4 Southwest Texas State $^	6	–	1	–	0	13	–	1	–	0
No. 9 Texas A&I	5	–	2	–	0	9	–	2	–	0
Abilene Christian	5	–	2	–	0	8	–	2	–	0
Angelo State	5	–	2	–	0	8	–	3	–	0
No. 17 East Texas State	4	–	3	–	0	7	–	4	–	0
Sam Houston State	2	–	5	–	0	3	–	7	–	0
Howard Payne	1	–	6	–	0	3	–	7	–	0
Stephen F. Austin	0	–	7	–	0	1	–	10	–	0
$ – Conference champion; ^ – NCAA Division II playoff participant; Rankings from NCAA Division II Football Committee poll for Southwest Texas State and Texas A&I and NAIA Division I poll for East Texas State

1981 Missouri Intercollegiate Athletic Association football standings
	Conf.					Overall
Team	W		L		T	W		L		T
NE Missouri State $	4	–	1	–	0	6	–	4	–	0
Missouri-Rolla	3	–	1	–	1	6	–	3	–	1
NW Missouri State	3	–	2	–	0	6	–	4	–	0
Central Missouri State	2	–	2	–	1	4	–	4	–	3
SE Missouri State	2	–	3	–	0	2	–	9	–	0
Lincoln (MO)	0	–	5	–	0	0	–	11	–	0
$ – Conference champion; ^ – NCAA Division II playoff participant

1981 North Central Conference football standings
	Conf.					Overall
Team	W		L		T	W		L		T
No. 6 North Dakota State $^	7	–	0	–	0	10	–	3	–	0
North Dakota	4	–	3	–	0	6	–	4	–	0
Northern Colorado	4	–	3	–	0	5	–	4	–	0
South Dakota *	3	–	3	–	1	5	–	6	–	0
Nebraska–Omaha	3	–	4	–	0	5	–	6	–	0
South Dakota State *	2	–	4	–	1	4	–	6	–	0
Morningside	2	–	5	–	0	5	–	6	–	0
Augustana (SD)	2	–	5	–	0	3	–	7	–	0
+ – Conference co-champions; ^ – NCAA Division II playoff participant; * – South Dakota and South Dakota State split two head-to-head games, which counted as a tie for each team in the conference standings.; Rankings from AP Poll

1981 Northern Intercollegiate Conference football standings
	Conf.					Overall
Team	W		L		T	W		L		T
No. 1 Moorhead State $*	6	–	0	–	0	10	–	1	–	1
Minnesota Duluth	5	–	1	–	0	9	–	1	–	0
Minnesota Morris ^	4	–	2	–	0	7	–	3	–	1
Southwest State (MN)	3	–	3	–	0	6	–	4	–	0
Northern State	2	–	4	–	0	4	–	6	–	0
Winona State	1	–	5	–	0	1	–	9	–	0
Bemidji State	0	–	6	–	0	0	–	10	–	0
$ – Conference champion; ^ – NCAA Division III playoff participant; * – NAIA Division I playoff participant; Rankings from NAIA Division I poll

1981 Pennsylvania State Athletic Conference football standings
	Conf.					Overall
Team	W		L		T	W		L		T
East Division
Millersville xy	5	–	0	–	0	8	–	3	–	0
Kutztown	3	–	2	–	0	5	–	4	–	0
East Stroudsburg	3	–	2	–	0	4	–	6	–	0
Mansfield	3	–	2	–	0	4	–	6	–	0
Cheyney	1	–	4	–	0	2	–	8	–	0
Bloomsburg	0	–	5	–	0	0	–	10	–	0
West Division
No. 8 Shippensburg xy$^	6	–	0	–	0	12	–	1	–	0
California (PA)	4	–	2	–	0	5	–	5	–	0
Clarion	3	–	3	–	0	6	–	4	–	0
Lock Haven	3	–	3	–	0	6	–	4	–	0
Indiana (PA)	2	–	4	–	0	4	–	6	–	0
Slippery Rock	2	–	4	–	0	2	–	7	–	0
Edinboro	1	–	5	–	0	2	–	6	–	0
Championship: Shippensburg 34, Millersville 17
$ – Conference champion; x – Division champion/co-champions; y – Championship game participant; ^ – NCAA Division II playoff participant; Rankings from AP Poll

1981 Southern Intercollegiate Athletic Conference football standings
	Conf.					Overall
Team	W		L		T	W		L		T
Division II
Morris Brown *	6	–	1	–	0	6	–	4	–	0
Alabama A&M x	2	–	1	–	0	7	–	3	–	0
Fort Valley State	5	–	2	–	0	9	–	2	–	0
Tuskegee	5	–	2	–	0	7	–	4	–	0
Savannah State	4	–	4	–	0	4	–	6	–	0
Morehouse	3	–	6	–	0	3	–	7	–	0
Albany State	0	–	7	–	0	0	–	10	–	0
Division III
Knoxville x	4	–	1	–	0	6	–	2	–	0
Clark	3	–	3	–	0	3	–	6	–	0
Miles	2	–	3	–	1	2	–	7	–	1
Lane	2	–	3	–	1	2	–	7	–	1
Fisk	0	–	6	–	0	0	–	9	–	0
x – Division champion/co-champions; * – Morris Brown was stripped of their division title for using ineligible players. Alabama A&M is recognized as the Division II champion by the SIAC.

1981 NCAA Division II independents football records
	Conf.			Overall
Team	W	L	T	W		L		T
No. 1 Northern Michigan ^		–		11	–	1	–	0
Puget Sound		–		10	–	2	–	0
West Chester		–		8	–	3	–	0
Eastern Washington		–		7	–	3	–	0
Saint Mary's		–		7	–	3	–	0
Southern Connecticut State		–		6	–	3	–	1
Alabama State		–		5	–	4	–	1
Arkansas–Pine Bluff		–		5	–	4	–	2
Central Connecticut		–		5	–	5	–	0
Mankato State		–		5	–	5	–	0
Towson State		–		5	–	5	–	0
Morgan State		–		4	–	5	–	0
St. Cloud State		–		4	–	6	–	1
Central State (OH)		–		4	–	7	–	0
Sonoma State		–		3	–	7	–	0
Kentucky State		–		2	–	6	–	0
Santa Clara		–		2	–	8	–	0
Portland State		–		2	–	9	–	0
American International		–		1	–	8	–	0
Liberty		–		1	–	9	–	0
^ – NCAA Division II playoff participant; Rankings from NCAA Division II Football Committee poll

== Conference summaries ==
Conference Champions

Central Intercollegiate Athletic Association – Virginia Union
Far Western Football Conference – UC Davis and Cal State–Hayward
Great Lakes Intercollegiate Athletic Conference – Grand Valley State
Gulf South Conference – Jacksonville State
Heartland Collegiate Conference – Franklin and Indiana Central
Lone Star Conference – Southwest Texas State
Missouri Intercollegiate Athletic Association – Northeast Missouri State
North Central Conference – North Dakota State
Northern Intercollegiate Conference – Minnesota State–Moorhead
Pennsylvania State Athletic Conference – Shippensburg
Rocky Mountain Athletic Conference – New Mexico Highlands
South Atlantic Conference – Elon
Southern Intercollegiate Athletic Conference – Alabama A&M

== Postseason ==
1981 NCAA Division II Football Championship
- Teams: 8
- Finals Site: Veterans Stadium; McAllen, TX
- Champion: Southwest Texas State; (1st title, 1st title game)
- Runner-up: North Dakota State; (1st title game)
- Semifinalists: Northern Michigan; Shippensburg State
- Winning coach: Jim Wacker; 1st championship

The 1981 NCAA Division II Football Championship playoffs were the ninth single-elimination tournament to determine the national champion of men's NCAA Division II college football. The championship game was held at McAllen Veterans Memorial Stadium in McAllen, Texas, for the first time.

=== Playoff bracket ===
First round Campus sites
Northern Michigan	55
Elizabeth City State	6
Southwest Texas State	38
Jacksonville State	22
North Dakota State	24
Puget Sound	10
Shippensburg	40
Virginia Union	27

Semifinals; Campus sites
Northern Michigan	0
Southwest Texas State	62
North Dakota State	18
Shippensburg	6

Championship; McAllen Veterans Memorial Stadium; McAllen, TX
Southwest Texas State	42
North Dakota State	13

== See also ==
- 1981 NCAA Division I-A football season
- 1981 NCAA Division I-AA football season
- 1981 NCAA Division III football season
- 1981 NAIA Division I football season
- 1981 NAIA Division II football season
