= 1981 NCAA Division II football rankings =

The 1981 NCAA Division II football rankings are from the NCAA Division II football committee. This is for the 1981 season.

== Legend ==
	Increase in ranking
	Decrease in ranking
	Not ranked previous week
(#–#)	Win–loss record
(Italics)	Number of first place votes
т	Tied with team above or below also with this symbol

== NCAA Division II Football Committee poll ==
	Week 1 Sept 23	Week 2 Sept 30	Week 3 Oct 7	Week 4 Oct 14	Week 5 Oct 21	Week 6 Oct 28	Week 7 Nov 4	Week 8 Nov 11	Week 9 Nov 18	Week 10 Nov 25	
1.	North Dakota (3–0)	Southwest Texas State (4–0)	Southwest Texas State (4–0)	Southwest Texas State (5–0)	Southwest Texas State (6–0)	Southwest Texas State (7–0)	Southwest Texas State (8–0)	Southwest Texas State (9–0)	Southwest Texas State (10–0)	Northern Michigan (10–0)	1.
2.	Northern Michigan (3–0)	Northern Michigan (4–0)	Northern Michigan (5–0)	Northern Michigan (5–0)	Northern Michigan (6–0)	Northern Michigan (7–0)	Northern Michigan (8–0)	Northern Michigan (9–0)	Northern Michigan (10–0)	Virginia Union (11–0)	2.
3.	Southwest Texas State (3–0)	Puget Sound (4–0)	Puget Sound (5–0)	Virginia Union (5–0)	Virginia Union (6–0)	Virginia Union (7–0)	Virginia Union (8–1)	Virginia Union (9–0)	Virginia Union (10–0)	Puget Sound (10–1)	3.
4.	Puget Sound (3–0)	Virginia Union (3–0)	Virginia Union (4–0)	Texas A&I (5–0)	Texas A&I (6–0)	Texas A&I (7–0)	Puget Sound (7–1)	Puget Sound (9–1)	Puget Sound (10–1)	Southwest Texas State (10–1)	4.
5.	Virginia Union (2–0)	Livingston (3–0)	Texas A&I (4–0)	Puget Sound (5–1)	Puget Sound (6–1)	Puget Sound (7–1)	Elizabeth City State (7–1)	Elizabeth City State (8–1)	Jacksonville State (7–2)	Jacksonville State (8–2)	5.
6.	Mississippi College (2–0)	Texas A&I (3–0)	Abilene Christian (3–0)	Shippensburg (5–0)	Elizabeth City State (5–1)	Elizabeth City State (6–1)	Texas A&I (5–2)	Jacksonville State (6–2)	North Dakota State (8–2)	North Dakota State (8–2)	6.
7.	Texas A&I (3–0)	Abilene Christian (3–0)	Shippensburg (4–0)	Elizabeth City State (4–1)	Jacksonville State (4–2)	Jacksonville State (4–2)	Jacksonville State (7–2)	North Dakota State (8–2)	North Alabama (8–1)	Elizabeth City State (8–2)	7.
8.	Clarion State (2–0)	Shippensburg (3–0)	North Dakota (4–1)	North Dakota (5–1)	Shippensburg (6–0)	Shippensburg (7–0)	North Dakota State (8–0)	North Alabama (7–1)	Elizabeth City State (8–2)	Shippensburg (11–0)	8.
9.	Livingston (2–0)	North Dakota (3–1)	Cal State Northridge (3–0–1) (Note: In the actual printed polls, Cal State Northridge was listed as Northridge State)	Cal State Northridge (4–0–1)	Minnesota–Duluth (7–0)	North Dakota State (6–2)	Shippensburg (6–1)	Shippensburg (9–0)	Grand Valley State (7–2)	Texas A&I (9–2)	9.
10.	Elizabeth City State (2–0)	Minnesota–Duluth (4–0)	Livingston (3–1)	Jacksonville State (3–2)	North Dakota State (5–2)	Minnesota–Duluth (8–0)	North Alabama	Abilene Christian (7–1)	Shippensburg (10–0)	Grand Valley State (7–2)	10.
11.	Morgan State (2–0)	West Chester State (3–0)	Lock Haven (4–0)					Grand Valley State (6–2)		North Alabama (8–2)	11.
12.			Minnesota–Duluth (5–0)								12.
	Week 1 Sept 23	Week 2 Sept 30	Week 3 Oct 7	Week 4 Oct 14	Week 5 Oct 21	Week 6 Oct 28	Week 7 Nov 4	Week 8 Nov 11	Week 9 Nov 18	Week 10 Nov 25	
		Dropped: 6 Mississippi College; 8 Clarion State; 10 Elizabeth City State; 11 Morgan State	Dropped: 11 West Chester State	Dropped: 6 Abilene Christian; 10 Livingston; 11 Lock Haven; 11 Minnesota–Duluth	Dropped: 8 North Dakota; 9 Cal State Northridge	None	Dropped: 10 Minnesota–Duluth	Dropped: 6 Texas A&I	Dropped: 10 Abilene Christian	None	
