= 1984 NCAA Division II football rankings =

The 1984 NCAA Division II football rankings are from the NCAA Division II football committee. This is for the 1984 season.

== Legend ==
	Increase in ranking
	Decrease in ranking
	Not ranked previous week
(#–#)	Win–loss record
(Italics)	Number of first place votes
т	Tied with team above or below also with this symbol

== NCAA Division II Football Committee poll ==
	Week 1 Sept 19	Week 2 Sept 26	Week 3 Oct 3	Week 4 Oct 10	Week 5 Oct 17	Week 6 Oct 24	Week 7 Oct 31	Week 8 Nov 7	Week 9 Nov 14	
1.	Troy State (2–0) (3)	Central State (OH) (4–0) (2) т	Central State (OH) (5–0) (2)	Central State (OH) (5–0) (2)	Central State (OH) (6–0) (2)	Central State (OH) (7–0) (3)	North Dakota State (7–1) (4)	North Dakota State (8–1) (4)	North Dakota State (9–1) (4)	1.
2.	Central State (OH) (3–0) (1) т	Troy State (3–0) (2) т	Troy State (4–0) (2)	Troy State (5–0) (2)	Troy State (6–0) (2)	Troy State (7–0) (1)	Norfolk State (8–1)	Nebraska–Omaha (9–1)	Nebraska–Omaha (10–1)	2.
3.	Nebraska–Omaha (3–0) т	Nebraska–Omaha (4–0) т	Towson State (5–0)	Towson State (6–0)	Towson State (7–0)	North Dakota State (6–1)	Nebraska–Omaha (7–1)	Troy State (8–1)	Central State (OH) (9–1) т	3.
4.	Towson State (3–0) т	Towson State (4–0) т	North Dakota (5–0)	North Dakota (6–0)	North Dakota (7–0)	Nebraska–Omaha (7–1)	Central State (OH) (8–0)	Central State (OH) (8–1)	Troy State (9–1) т	4.
5.	Fort Valley State (2–0)	North Dakota (4–0)	Santa Clara (4–0)	Norfolk State (5–0)	North Dakota State (5–1)	Norfolk State (7–0)	Northwest Missouri State (7–1)	Northwest Missouri State (9–0)	Northwest Missouri State (10–0)	5.
6.	Angelo State (2–1)	Santa Clara (3–0)	Clarion (4–0)	Missouri–Rolla (5–0)	Norfolk State (6–0)	IUP (6–1) (Note: In the actual printed polls, IUP was listed as Indiana (PA))	Troy State (6–1)	UC Davis (7–1)	UC Davis (8–1) т	6.
7.	North Dakota (3–0)	Clarion (3–0)	Norfolk State (4–0)	North Dakota State (4–1)	Indiana State (5–1)	Towson State (7–1)	UC Davis (6–2)	Norfolk State (8–1)	Norfolk State (9–1) т	7.
8.	UC Davis (1–0) (Note: In the actual printed polls, UC Davis was listed as California Davis)	Indiana Central (3–0)	Missouri–Rolla (4–0)	Nebraska–Omaha (5–1)	Nebraska–Omaha (6–1)	Northwest Missouri State (7–0)	IUP (5–1–1)	IUP (7–2)	Towson State (8–2)	8.
9.	Abilene Christian (1–1) т	Missouri–Rolla (4–0)	North Dakota State (3–1)	Santa Clara (4–1)	UC Davis (4–1)	UC Davis (5–1) т	Mississippi College (7–2)	Mississippi College (6–1–1)	Mississippi College (6–1–1)	9.
10.	West Chester (2–0)	Norfolk State (3–0)	Nebraska–Omaha (4–1)	Mississippi College (3–0–1)	Northwest Missouri State (6–0)	North Dakota (7–1) т	Towson State ()	Towson State (7–2)	Angelo State (7–3)	10.
	Week 1 Sept 19	Week 2 Sept 26	Week 3 Oct 3	Week 4 Oct 10	Week 5 Oct 17	Week 6 Oct 24	Week 7 Oct 31	Week 8 Nov 7	Week 9 Nov 14	
		Dropped: 5 Fort Valley State; 6 Angelo State; 8 UC Davis; 9 Abilene Christian; 10 West Chester	Dropped: 8 Indiana Central	Dropped: 6 Clarion	Dropped: 6 Missouri–Rolla; 9 Santa Clara; 10 Mississippi College	Dropped: 7 Indiana State	Dropped: 10 North Dakota	None	Dropped: 8 IUP	
