= List of Northern California Athletic Conference football standings =

This is a list of yearly Northern California Athletic Conference football standings.

== Northern California Athletic Conference standings ==
=== Far Western Conference standings ===
1925 Far Western Conference football standings
	Conf.					Overall
Team	W		L		T	W		L		T
Saint Mary's $	3	–	0	–	0	8	–	2	–	0
Nevada	3	–	1	–	0	4	–	3	–	1
Cal Aggies	2	–	2	–	0	5	–	3	–	0
Pacific (CA)	1	–	2	–	0	5	–	2	–	0
Fresno State	0	–	4	–	0	2	–	6	–	1
$ – Conference champion

1926 Far Western Conference football standings
	Conf.					Overall
Team	W		L		T	W		L		T
Saint Mary's $	4	–	0	–	0	9	–	0	–	1
Nevada	3	–	1	–	0	4	–	4	–	0
Fresno State	1	–	2	–	1	5	–	3	–	1
Pacific (CA)	1	–	2	–	1	5	–	3	–	1
Cal Aggies	0	–	4	–	0	2	–	6	–	1
$ – Conference champion

1927 Far Western Conference football standings
	Conf.					Overall
Team	W		L		T	W		L		T
Saint Mary's $	3	–	0	–	0	7	–	2	–	1
Cal Aggies	2	–	1	–	0	4	–	3	–	1
Fresno State	2	–	1	–	1	3	–	3	–	2
St. Ignatius (CA)	2	–	2	–	1	3	–	5	–	1
Nevada	1	–	3	–	0	2	–	6	–	1
Pacific (CA)	1	–	4	–	0	2	–	6	–	0
$ – Conference champion

1928 Far Western Conference football standings
	Conf.					Overall
Team	W		L		T	W		L		T
Saint Mary's $	2	–	0	–	0	5	–	4	–	0
Cal Aggies	3	–	1	–	0	6	–	3	–	0
St. Ignatius (CA)	3	–	1	–	0	4	–	4	–	0
Pacific (CA)	2	–	1	–	0	5	–	2	–	0
Fresno State	0	–	3	–	1	2	–	5	–	1
Nevada	0	–	4	–	1	0	–	7	–	1
$ – Conference champion

1929 Far Western Conference football standings
	Conf.					Overall
Team	W		L		T	W		L		T
Cal Aggies $	5	–	0	–	0	6	–	2	–	0
Nevada	2	–	1	–	0	2	–	5	–	1
San Jose State	2	–	1	–	1	3	–	3	–	1
Pacific (CA)	1	–	3	–	1	3	–	4	–	1
Chico State	1	–	3	–	0	3	–	5	–	0
Fresno State	1	–	4	–	0	1	–	7	–	0
$ – Conference champion

1930 Far Western Conference football standings
	Conf.					Overall
Team	W		L		T	W		L		T
Fresno State $	5	–	0	–	0	8	–	0	–	0
Nevada	2	–	1	–	0	2	–	4	–	2
Pacific (CA)	2	–	2	–	0	3	–	6	–	0
San Jose State	1	–	2	–	1	2	–	3	–	3
Chico State	0	–	2	–	0	3	–	4	–	0
Cal Aggies	0	–	3	–	1	0	–	7	–	1
$ – Conference champion

1931 Far Western Conference football standings
	Conf.					Overall
Team	W		L		T	W		L		T
Pacific (CA)	2	–	1	–	2	5	–	2	–	2
Cal Aggies	2	–	1	–	2	4	–	2	–	2
Chico State	2	–	1	–	1	3	–	4	–	1
Nevada	2	–	1	–	1	2	–	5	–	2
Fresno State	3	–	2	–	0	4	–	6	–	0
San Jose State	0	–	5	–	0	1	–	8	–	0
No champion was named for the 1931 season.

1932 Far Western Conference football standings
	Conf.					Overall
Team	W		L		T	W		L		T
San Jose State +	3	–	0	–	2	7	–	0	–	2
Nevada +	2	–	0	–	1	3	–	3	–	2
Chico State	2	–	1	–	0	3	–	5	–	0
Pacific (CA)	2	–	2	–	0	4	–	4	–	0
Cal Aggies	1	–	4	–	0	1	–	8	–	1
Fresno State	0	–	3	–	1	3	–	5	–	2
+ – Conference co-champions

1933 Far Western Conference football standings
	Conf.					Overall
Team	W		L		T	W		L		T
Nevada $	3	–	0	–	0	4	–	4	–	0
San Jose State	3	–	1	–	0	4	–	4	–	0
Pacific (CA)	3	–	2	–	0	5	–	5	–	0
Fresno State	1	–	2	–	0	5	–	4	–	0
Chico State	1	–	3	–	0	2	–	6	–	0
Cal Aggies	1	–	4	–	0	2	–	5	–	0
$ – Conference champion

1934 Far Western Conference football standings
	Conf.					Overall
Team	W		L		T	W		L		T
Fresno State +	3	–	0	–	1	7	–	2	–	1
San Jose State +	2	–	0	–	3	3	–	3	–	4
Chico State	2	–	1	–	1	4	–	3	–	1
Pacific (CA)	2	–	2	–	0	4	–	5	–	0
Cal Aggies	0	–	2	–	2	0	–	5	–	3
Nevada	0	–	4	–	1	1	–	7	–	1
+ – Conference co-champions

1935 Far Western Conference football standings
	Conf.					Overall
Team	W		L		T	W		L		T
Fresno State $	4	–	0	–	0	6	–	3	–	0
Pacific (CA)	3	–	1	–	0	5	–	4	–	1
Nevada	2	–	2	–	0	2	–	6	–	0
Cal Aggies	1	–	3	–	0	2	–	6	–	1
Chico State	0	–	4	–	0	2	–	5	–	1
$ – Conference champion

1936 Far Western Conference football standings
	Conf.					Overall
Team	W		L		T	W		L		T
Pacific (CA) $	4	–	0	–	0	5	–	4	–	1
Fresno State	2	–	1	–	0	5	–	3	–	1
Nevada	2	–	2	–	0	4	–	4	–	0
Cal Aggies	1	–	2	–	0	3	–	4	–	0
Chico State	0	–	4	–	0	1	–	6	–	1
$ – Conference champion

1937 Far Western Conference football standings
	Conf.					Overall
Team	W		L		T	W		L		T
Fresno State $	4	–	0	–	0	8	–	1	–	1
Pacific (CA)	3	–	1	–	0	3	–	5	–	2
Cal Aggies	2	–	2	–	0	4	–	4	–	0
Nevada	1	–	3	–	0	2	–	6	–	0
Chico State	0	–	4	–	0	0	–	6	–	1
$ – Conference champion

1938 Far Western Conference football standings
	Conf.					Overall
Team	W		L		T	W		L		T
Pacific (CA) $	4	–	0	–	0	7	–	3	–	0
Fresno State	2	–	1	–	0	7	–	3	–	0
Nevada	1	–	2	–	0	2	–	3	–	1
Chico State	0	–	2	–	1	2	–	5	–	1
Cal Aggies	0	–	2	–	1	2	–	6	–	1
$ – Conference champion

1939 Far Western Conference football standings
	Conf.					Overall
Team	W		L		T	W		L		T
Fresno State	2	–	0	–	0	10	–	1	–	1
Nevada $	3	–	1	–	0	5	–	4	–	0
Pacific (CA)	2	–	2	–	0	6	–	6	–	1
Chico State	1	–	2	–	0	2	–	4	–	2
Cal Aggies	0	–	3	–	0	4	–	4	–	0
$ – Conference champion; Fresno State was ineligible for the conference championship because they only played two league games.

1940 Far Western Conference football standings
	Conf.					Overall
Team	W		L		T	W		L		T
Pacific (CA) $	2	–	0	–	0	4	–	5	–	0
Cal Aggies	2	–	1	–	0	4	–	4	–	1
Chico State	1	–	2	–	0	3	–	3	–	1
Humboldt State	0	–	2	–	0	3	–	4	–	0
$ – Conference champion

1941 Far Western Conference football standings
	Conf.					Overall
Team	W		L		T	W		L		T
Pacific (CA) $	3	–	0	–	0	4	–	7	–	0
Cal Aggies	2	–	1	–	0	2	–	2	–	4
Chico State	1	–	2	–	0	1	–	5	–	2
Humboldt State	0	–	3	–	0	2	–	5	–	1
$ – Conference champion

1942 Far Western Conference football standings
	Conf.					Overall
Team	W		L		T	W		L		T
Pacific (CA) $	2	–	0	–	0	2	–	6	–	1
Chico State	1	–	1	–	0	5	–	1	–	0
Cal Aggies	0	–	2	–	0	1	–	6	–	0
$ – Conference champion

1946 Far Western Conference football standings
	Conf.					Overall
Team	W		L		T	W		L		T
Humboldt State	1	–	0	–	1	5	–	3	–	1
Chico State	1	–	1	–	0	2	–	7	–	0
Cal Aggies	0	–	1	–	1	0	–	5	–	2
No conference champion was named in 1946.

1947 Far Western Conference football standings
	Conf.					Overall
Team	W		L		T	W		L		T
Southern Oregon +	3	–	1	–	0	7	–	3	–	0
Cal Aggies +	3	–	1	–	0	4	–	5	–	0
Humboldt State	2	–	2	–	0	5	–	4	–	0
Chico State	1	–	3	–	0	4	–	5	–	0
San Francisco State	1	–	3	–	0	2	–	5	–	0
+ – Conference co-champions

1948 Far Western Conference football standings
	Conf.					Overall
Team	W		L		T	W		L		T
Chico State +	3	–	1	–	0	5	–	3	–	0
Southern Oregon +	3	–	1	–	0	5	–	5	–	0
San Francisco State	2	–	2	–	0	3	–	5	–	0
Humboldt State	1	–	3	–	0	6	–	3	–	0
Cal Aggies	1	–	3	–	0	2	–	6	–	0
+ – Conference co-champions

1949 Far Western Conference football standings
	Conf.					Overall
Team	W		L		T	W		L		T
Cal Aggies $	4	–	0	–	0	5	–	4	–	0
Southern Oregon	2	–	1	–	1	5	–	2	–	1
San Francisco State	1	–	2	–	1	3	–	4	–	1
Chico State	1	–	2	–	1	2	–	6	–	1
Humboldt State	0	–	3	–	1	0	–	8	–	1
$ – Conference champion

1950 Far Western Conference football standings
	Conf.					Overall
Team	W		L		T	W		L		T
San Francisco State $	4	–	0	–	0	6	–	2	–	0
Cal Aggies	3	–	1	–	0	3	–	5	–	0
Chico State	2	–	2	–	0	2	–	6	–	0
Southern Oregon	1	–	3	–	0	3	–	7	–	0
Humboldt State	0	–	4	–	0	0	–	4	–	1
$ – Conference champion

1951 Far Western Conference football standings
	Conf.					Overall
Team	W		L		T	W		L		T
Cal Aggies $	3	–	1	–	0	5	–	4	–	0
San Francisco State	2	–	0	–	0	8	–	2	–	0
Humboldt State	2	–	1	–	0	4	–	3	–	1
Southern Oregon	1	–	2	–	0	1	–	8	–	0
Chico State	0	–	4	–	0	0	–	7	–	0
$ – Conference champion

1952 Far Western Conference football standings
	Conf.					Overall
Team	W		L		T	W		L		T
Humboldt State $	3	–	0	–	0	7	–	1	–	0
Cal Aggies	2	–	1	–	0	2	–	7	–	0
San Francisco State	1	–	0	–	0	3	–	6	–	0
Chico State	1	–	3	–	0	1	–	6	–	0
Southern Oregon	0	–	3	–	0	3	–	5	–	0
$ – Conference champion

1953 Far Western Conference football standings
	Conf.					Overall
Team	W		L		T	W		L		T
Chico State $	4	–	0	–	1	6	–	3	–	1
Humboldt State	2	–	1	–	0	6	–	2	–	0
Cal Aggies	1	–	2	–	1	1	–	6	–	1
San Francisco State	0	–	1	–	0	5	–	3	–	0
Southern Oregon	0	–	3	–	0	3	–	4	–	0
$ – Conference champion; Conference records includes both Chico State vs. Cal Aggies games

1954 Far Western Conference football standings
	Conf.					Overall
Team	W		L		T	W		L		T
San Francisco State $	5	–	0	–	0	8	–	2	–	0
Chico State	4	–	1	–	0	7	–	2	–	0
Humboldt State	3	–	2	–	0	5	–	5	–	0
Nevada	2	–	3	–	0	2	–	5	–	0
Cal Aggies	1	–	4	–	0	1	–	7	–	0
Sacramento State	0	–	5	–	0	0	–	7	–	0
$ – Conference champion; * – Second San Francisco State vs. Nevada game did not count in conference standings

1955 Far Western Conference football standings
	Conf.					Overall
Team	W		L		T	W		L		T
Chico State	5	–	0	–	0	7	–	2	–	0
Cal Aggies	3	–	1	–	1	5	–	3	–	1
San Francisco State	3	–	2	–	0	5	–	5	–	0
Humboldt State	2	–	2	–	1	7	–	3	–	1
Nevada	1	–	4	–	0	2	–	5	–	0
Sacramento State	0	–	5	–	0	2	–	6	–	0
No conference champion was named for the 1955 season.

1956 Far Western Conference football standings
	Conf.					Overall
Team	W		L		T	W		L		T
Humboldt State +	4	–	1	–	0	9	–	2	–	0
Cal Aggies +	4	–	1	–	0	7	–	2	–	0
San Francisco State +	4	–	1	–	0	5	–	5	–	0
Chico State	1	–	3	–	1	2	–	6	–	1
Sacramento State	1	–	4	–	0	3	–	5	–	1
Nevada	0	–	4	–	1	0	–	7	–	1
+ – Conference co-champions

1957 Far Western Conference football standings
	Conf.					Overall
Team	W		L		T	W		L		T
San Francisco State $	5	–	0	–	0	7	–	3	–	0
Chico State	4	–	1	–	0	7	–	2	–	0
Humboldt State	3	–	2	–	0	4	–	6	–	0
Sacramento State	2	–	3	–	0	5	–	4	–	0
Nevada	1	–	4	–	0	1	–	8	–	0
Cal Aggies	0	–	5	–	0	1	–	7	–	1
$ – Conference champion

1958 Far Western Conference football standings
	Conf.					Overall
Team	W		L		T	W		L		T
San Francisco State $	4	–	1	–	0	7	–	3	–	0
Humboldt State	3	–	2	–	0	7	–	2	–	1
Cal Aggies	3	–	2	–	0	5	–	4	–	0
Chico State	2	–	3	–	0	5	–	5	–	0
Nevada	2	–	3	–	0	3	–	3	–	0
Sacramento State	1	–	4	–	0	3	–	6	–	0
$ – Conference champion

1959 Far Western Conference football standings
	Conf.					Overall
Team	W		L		T	W		L		T
No. 17 San Francisco State $	5	–	0	–	0	10	–	0	–	0
Humboldt State	4	–	1	–	0	9	–	1	–	0
Nevada	3	–	2	–	0	4	–	3	–	0
Chico State	2	–	3	–	0	4	–	4	–	0
Sacramento State	1	–	4	–	0	2	–	7	–	0
UC Davis	0	–	5	–	0	1	–	8	–	0
$ – Conference champion; Rankings from UPI small college poll

1960 Far Western Conference football standings
	Conf.					Overall
Team	W		L		T	W		L		T
No. 2/3 Humboldt State $	5	–	0	–	0	11	–	1	–	0
San Francisco State	4	–	1	–	0	9	–	1	–	0
Chico State	2	–	3	–	0	6	–	4	–	0
Sacramento State	2	–	3	–	0	5	–	5	–	0
Nevada	2	–	3	–	0	3	–	6	–	0
UC Davis	0	–	5	–	0	0	–	8	–	1
$ – Conference champion; Rankings from NAIA poll and AP small college poll

1961 Far Western Conference football standings
	Conf.					Overall
Team	W		L		T	W		L		T
No. 13/16 Humboldt State +	4	–	1	–	0	8	–	2	–	0
San Francisco State +	4	–	1	–	0	8	–	2	–	0
UC Davis	3	–	2	–	0	5	–	4	–	0
Nevada	2	–	3	–	0	5	–	4	–	0
Sacramento State	2	–	3	–	0	4	–	5	–	0
Chico State	0	–	5	–	0	4	–	6	–	0
+ – Conference co-champions; Rankings from NAIA poll and UPI small college poll

1962 Far Western Conference football standings
	Conf.					Overall
Team	W		L		T	W		L		T
San Francisco State $	3	–	1	–	1	6	–	2	–	1
Humboldt State	3	–	2	–	0	7	–	2	–	0
Nevada	2	–	2	–	1	5	–	3	–	1
UC Davis	2	–	3	–	0	5	–	4	–	0
Chico State	2	–	3	–	0	4	–	4	–	1
Sacramento State	2	–	3	–	0	2	–	7	–	0
$ – Conference champion

1963 Far Western Conference football standings
	Conf.					Overall
Team	W		L		T	W		L		T
Humboldt State +	3	–	1	–	1	6	–	1	–	2
San Francisco State +	3	–	1	–	1	6	–	2	–	1
UC Davis +	3	–	1	–	1	6	–	2	–	1
Sacramento State	2	–	2	–	1	6	–	2	–	1
Nevada	2	–	3	–	0	3	–	6	–	0
Chico State	0	–	5	–	0	2	–	7	–	0
+ – Conference co-champions

1964 Far Western Conference football standings
	Conf.					Overall
Team	W		L		T	W		L		T
Sacramento State $	4	–	0	–	1	8	–	2	–	1
Humboldt State	4	–	1	–	0	8	–	2	–	0
San Francisco State	3	–	1	–	1	6	–	3	–	1
UC Davis	2	–	3	–	0	3	–	6	–	0
Nevada	1	–	4	–	0	1	–	9	–	0
Chico State	0	–	5	–	0	0	–	9	–	0
$ – Conference champion

1965 Far Western Conference football standings
	Conf.					Overall
Team	W		L		T	W		L		T
San Francisco State $	5	–	0	–	0	8	–	2	–	0
Nevada	4	–	1	–	0	6	–	4	–	0
UC Davis	3	–	2	–	0	4	–	6	–	0
Humboldt State	2	–	3	–	0	6	–	4	–	0
Sacramento State	1	–	4	–	0	3	–	7	–	0
Chico State	0	–	5	–	0	4	–	6	–	0
Cal State Hayward*	0	–	0	–	0	3	–	7	–	0
$ – Conference champion; * – Games vs. Cal State Hayward did not count as conference games in 1965.

1966 Far Western Conference football standings
	Conf.					Overall
Team	W		L		T	W		L		T
Sacramento State $	6	–	0	–	0	8	–	2	–	0
San Francisco State	5	–	1	–	0	7	–	3	–	0
Nevada	3	–	3	–	0	6	–	3	–	0
UC Davis	3	–	3	–	0	5	–	5	–	0
Humboldt State	2	–	4	–	0	4	–	6	–	0
Chico State	1	–	5	–	0	4	–	6	–	0
Cal State Hayward	1	–	5	–	0	2	–	8	–	0
$ – Conference champion

1967 Far Western Conference football standings
	Conf.					Overall
Team	W		L		T	W		L		T
No. 17 San Francisco State $	6	–	0	–	0	9	–	2	–	0
Sacramento State	4	–	2	–	0	7	–	3	–	0
Humboldt State	3	–	2	–	1	6	–	3	–	1
Cal State Hayward	3	–	3	–	0	7	–	3	–	0
Nevada	2	–	3	–	1	4	–	4	–	1
UC Davis	2	–	4	–	0	3	–	6	–	0
Chico State	0	–	6	–	0	2	–	8	–	0
$ – Conference champion; Rankings from UPI small college poll

1968 Far Western Conference football standings
	Conf.					Overall
Team	W		L		T	W		L		T
No. 16 AP / #10 UPI Humboldt State $	6	–	0	–	0	10	–	1	–	0
Sacramento State	4	–	2	–	0	8	–	3	–	0
UC Davis	3	–	3	–	0	5	–	4	–	0
San Francisco State	3	–	3	–	0	5	–	5	–	0
Chico State	2	–	4	–	0	5	–	5	–	0
Cal State Hayward	1	–	4	–	1	5	–	4	–	1
Nevada	1	–	4	–	1	3	–	6	–	1
$ – Conference champion; Rankings from small college polls

1969 Far Western Conference football standings
	Conf.					Overall
Team	W		L		T	W		L		T
No. 15 UPI Cal State Hayward $	5	–	0	–	0	9	–	1	–	0
No. 12 AP Sacramento State	4	–	1	–	0	8	–	2	–	0
Chico State	3	–	2	–	0	8	–	2	–	0
Humboldt State	2	–	3	–	0	6	–	4	–	0
San Francisco State	1	–	4	–	0	3	–	7	–	0
UC Davis	0	–	5	–	0	3	–	7	–	0
$ – Conference champion; Rankings from small college polls

1970 Far Western Conference football standings
	Conf.					Overall
Team	W		L		T	W		L		T
Chico State +	3	–	1	–	0	8	–	3	–	0
Cal State Hayward +	3	–	1	–	0	7	–	4	–	0
UC Davis	2	–	2	–	0	6	–	4	–	0
Humboldt State	2	–	2	–	0	5	–	5	–	0
San Francisco State	0	–	4	–	0	0	–	9	–	1
Sonoma State *	0	–	0	–	0	4	–	4	–	1
Sacramento State *	0	–	0	–	0	4	–	6	–	0
+ – Conference co-champions; * – ineligible for conference championship

1971 Far Western Conference football standings
	Conf.					Overall
Team	W		L		T	W		L		T
UC Davis +	5	–	1	–	0	9	–	1	–	0
No. 11 Chico State +	5	–	1	–	0	9	–	2	–	0
Cal State Hayward	3	–	2	–	1	7	–	2	–	1
Humboldt State	3	–	3	–	0	7	–	4	–	0
Sacramento State	2	–	3	–	1	4	–	5	–	1
San Francisco State	2	–	4	–	0	5	–	6	–	0
Sonoma State	0	–	6	–	0	2	–	8	–	0
+ – Conference co-champions; Rankings from UPI small college poll

1972 Far Western Conference football standings
	Conf.					Overall
Team	W		L		T	W		L		T
UC Davis $	5	–	0	–	0	6	–	2	–	2
Humboldt State	4	–	1	–	0	7	–	3	–	0
Chico State	2	–	3	–	0	4	–	5	–	0
Cal State Hayward	2	–	3	–	0	2	–	8	–	0
San Francisco State	1	–	4	–	0	3	–	8	–	0
Sacramento State	1	–	4	–	0	2	–	8	–	0
$ – Conference champion

1973 Far Western Conference football standings
	Conf.					Overall
Team	W		L		T	W		L		T
UC Davis +	4	–	1	–	0	7	–	3	–	0
Chico State +	4	–	1	–	0	7	–	3	–	0
San Francisco State	3	–	2	–	0	7	–	2	–	1
Cal State Hayward	3	–	2	–	0	3	–	7	–	0
Humboldt State	1	–	4	–	0	2	–	6	–	2
Sacramento State	0	–	5	–	0	1	–	9	–	0
+ – Conference co-champions

1974 Far Western Conference football standings
	Conf.					Overall
Team	W		L		T	W		L		T
UC Davis $	5	–	0	–	0	9	–	1	–	0
San Francisco State	2	–	3	–	0	5	–	6	–	0
Humboldt State	2	–	3	–	0	4	–	6	–	0
Chico State	2	–	3	–	0	4	–	7	–	0
Cal State Hayward	2	–	3	–	0	3	–	6	–	0
Sacramento State	2	–	3	–	0	2	–	9	–	0
$ – Conference champion

1975 Far Western Conference football standings
	Conf.					Overall
Team	W		L		T	W		L		T
UC Davis $	5	–	0	–	0	7	–	3	–	0
Humboldt State	4	–	1	–	0	7	–	3	–	0
Sacramento State	2	–	3	–	0	5	–	5	–	0
San Francisco State	2	–	3	–	0	4	–	4	–	1
Chico State	2	–	3	–	0	4	–	6	–	0
Cal State Hayward	0	–	5	–	0	0	–	10	–	0
$ – Conference champion

1976 Far Western Conference football standings
	Conf.					Overall
Team	W		L		T	W		L		T
UC Davis $	5	–	0	–	0	8	–	2	–	0
Humboldt State	4	–	1	–	0	5	–	5	–	0
Chico State	2	–	3	–	0	5	–	6	–	0
San Francisco State	2	–	3	–	0	4	–	7	–	0
Sacramento State	2	–	3	–	0	2	–	8	–	0
Cal State Hayward	0	–	5	–	0	1	–	8	–	1
$ – Conference champion

1977 Far Western Conference football standings
	Conf.					Overall
Team	W		L		T	W		L		T
No. 3 UC Davis $^	5	–	0	–	0	11	–	1	–	0
Chico State	3	–	1	–	1	6	–	2	–	1
Cal State Hayward	2	–	2	–	1	6	–	3	–	1
San Francisco State	2	–	3	–	0	5	–	5	–	0
Humboldt State	1	–	3	–	1	5	–	4	–	1
Sacramento State	0	–	4	–	1	0	–	10	–	1
$ – Conference champion; ^ – NCAA Division II playoff participant; Rankings from Associated Press poll

1978 Far Western Conference football standings
	Conf.					Overall
Team	W		L		T	W		L		T
No. 4 UC Davis $^	5	–	0	–	0	8	–	3	–	0
Cal State Hayward	4	–	1	–	0	8	–	2	–	0
Humboldt State	3	–	2	–	0	5	–	6	–	0
Chico State	2	–	3	–	0	5	–	5	–	0
Sacramento State	1	–	4	–	0	1	–	9	–	0
San Francisco State	0	–	5	–	0	1	–	9	–	0
$ – Conference champion; ^ – NCAA Division II playoff participant; Rankings from Associated Press poll

1979 Far Western Conference football standings
	Conf.					Overall
Team	W		L		T	W		L		T
UC Davis $	5	–	0	–	0	7	–	2	–	1
Humboldt State	4	–	1	–	0	8	–	2	–	0
Chico State	2	–	3	–	0	5	–	6	–	0
Sacramento State	2	–	3	–	0	4	–	6	–	0
San Francisco State	1	–	4	–	0	3	–	7	–	0
Cal State Hayward	1	–	4	–	0	2	–	8	–	0
$ – Conference champion; Adjusted for Cal Poly Pomona forfeits to UC Davis and Sacramento State

1980 Far Western Conference football standings
	Conf.					Overall
Team	W		L		T	W		L		T
UC Davis $	5	–	0	–	0	7	–	2	–	1
Cal State Hayward	3	–	2	–	0	6	–	4	–	0
Chico State	3	–	2	–	0	5	–	5	–	0
San Francisco State	2	–	3	–	0	3	–	6	–	1
Sacramento State	1	–	4	–	0	3	–	7	–	0
Humboldt State	1	–	4	–	0	2	–	8	–	0
$ – Conference champion

1981 Far Western Conference football standings
	Conf.					Overall
Team	W		L		T	W		L		T
UC Davis +	4	–	1	–	0	6	–	4	–	0
Cal State Hayward +	4	–	1	–	0	6	–	4	–	1
Humboldt State	3	–	2	–	0	6	–	4	–	0
Chico State	3	–	2	–	0	5	–	5	–	0
Sacramento State	1	–	4	–	0	5	–	6	–	0
San Francisco State	0	–	5	–	0	3	–	7	–	0
+ – Conference co-champions

1982 Northern California Athletic Conference football standings
	Conf.					Overall
Team	W		L		T	W		L		T
No. 3 UC Davis $^	5	–	0	–	0	12	–	1	–	0
Sacramento State	3	–	2	–	0	8	–	3	–	0
Cal State Hayward	3	–	2	–	0	4	–	5	–	1
San Francisco State	2	–	3	–	0	4	–	6	–	0
Chico State	1	–	4	–	0	5	–	5	–	0
Humboldt State	1	–	4	–	0	3	–	7	–	0
$ – Conference champion; ^ – NCAA Division II playoff participant; Rankings from NCAA Division II Football Committee poll

=== Northern California Athletic Conference standings ===
1983 Northern California Athletic Conference football standings
	Conf.					Overall
Team	W		L		T	W		L		T
No. 1 UC Davis $^	6	–	0	–	0	11	–	1	–	0
Sacramento State	4	–	1	–	1	5	–	5	–	1
Chico State	3	–	2	–	1	4	–	5	–	1
Cal State Hayward	3	–	3	–	0	6	–	4	–	0
Humboldt State	3	–	3	–	0	4	–	6	–	0
San Francisco State	1	–	5	–	0	2	–	8	–	0
Sonoma State	0	–	6	–	0	2	–	9	–	0
$ – Conference champion; ^ – NCAA Division II playoff participant; Rankings from NCAA Division II Football Committee poll

1984 Northern California Athletic Conference football standings
	Conf.					Overall
Team	W		L		T	W		L		T
No. T–6 UC Davis $^	6	–	0	–	0	9	–	2	–	0
Sacramento State	5	–	1	–	0	6	–	5	–	0
Cal State Hayward	4	–	2	–	0	7	–	3	–	0
Chico State	2	–	3	–	1	4	–	5	–	1
Sonoma State	2	–	4	–	0	2	–	8	–	0
San Francisco State	1	–	4	–	1	1	–	8	–	1
Humboldt State	0	–	6	–	0	0	–	10	–	0
$ – Conference champion; ^ – NCAA Division II playoff participant; San Francisco State forfeited 3 wins including 1 conference win over Sonoma State.; Rankings from NCAA Division II Football Committee poll

1985 Northern California Athletic Conference football standings
	Conf.					Overall
Team	W		L		T	W		L		T
No. 1 UC Davis $^	5	–	0	–	0	9	–	2	–	0
Chico State	3	–	1	–	1	4	–	4	–	1
Cal State Hayward	2	–	2	–	1	6	–	3	–	1
San Francisco State	2	–	3	–	0	3	–	6	–	1
Sonoma State	1	–	4	–	0	3	–	7	–	0
Humboldt State	1	–	4	–	0	2	–	8	–	0
$ – Conference champion; ^ – NCAA Division II playoff participant; Rankings from NCAA Division II Football Committee poll

1986 Northern California Athletic Conference football standings
	Conf.					Overall
Team	W		L		T	W		L		T
No. 2 UC Davis $^	5	–	0	–	0	10	–	1	–	0
Chico State	4	–	1	–	0	7	–	3	–	0
Cal State Hayward	3	–	2	–	0	7	–	3	–	0
Sonoma State	2	–	3	–	0	4	–	6	–	0
San Francisco State	1	–	4	–	0	2	–	9	–	0
Humboldt State	0	–	5	–	0	2	–	9	–	0
$ – Conference champion; ^ – NCAA Division II playoff participant; Rankings from NCAA Division II Football Committee poll

1987 Northern California Athletic Conference football standings
	Conf.					Overall
Team	W		L		T	W		L		T
No. 10 UC Davis $	5	–	0	–	0	8	–	2	–	0
Chico State	3	–	2	–	0	3	–	6	–	0
Humboldt State	2	–	2	–	1	3	–	7	–	1
Sonoma State	2	–	3	–	0	5	–	6	–	0
Cal State Hayward	2	–	3	–	0	2	–	8	–	0
San Francisco State	0	–	4	–	1	1	–	8	–	1
$ – Conference champion; Rankings from NCAA Division II Football Committee poll

1988 Northern California Athletic Conference football standings
	Conf.					Overall
Team	W		L		T	W		L		T
No. 13 UC Davis $^	5	–	0	–	0	7	–	3	–	1
Sonoma State	3	–	2	–	0	5	–	5	–	0
Chico State	3	–	2	–	0	3	–	7	–	0
Humboldt State	2	–	3	–	0	4	–	6	–	0
Cal State Hayward	1	–	4	–	0	2	–	9	–	0
San Francisco State	1	–	4	–	0	1	–	9	–	0
$ – Conference champion; ^ – NCAA Division II playoff participant; Rankings from NCAA Division II Football Committee poll

1989 Northern California Athletic Conference football standings
	Conf.					Overall
Team	W		L		T	W		L		T
No. 16 UC Davis $^	5	–	0	–	0	8	–	3	–	0
Chico State	4	–	1	–	0	6	–	4	–	0
Humboldt State	3	–	2	–	0	6	–	4	–	0
Sonoma State	2	–	3	–	0	4	–	6	–	0
Cal State Hayward	1	–	4	–	0	1	–	8	–	0
San Francisco State	0	–	5	–	0	3	–	7	–	0
$ – Conference champion; ^ – NCAA Division II playoff participant; Rankings from NCAA Division II Football Committee poll

1990 Northern California Athletic Conference football standings
	Conf.					Overall
Team	W		L		T	W		L		T
UC Davis $	5	–	0	–	0	7	–	3	–	0
Sonoma State	4	–	1	–	0	7	–	3	–	0
Chico State	3	–	2	–	0	4	–	6	–	0
San Francisco State	1	–	4	–	0	4	–	7	–	0
Humboldt State	1	–	4	–	0	2	–	8	–	1
Cal State Hayward	1	–	4	–	0	2	–	9	–	0
$ – Conference champion; The first Humboldt State vs. Cal State Hayward game did not count as a conference game.

1991 Northern California Athletic Conference football standings
	Conf.					Overall
Team	W		L		T	W		L		T
Sonoma State $	5	–	0	–	0	9	–	2	–	0
UC Davis	3	–	2	–	0	7	–	3	–	0
Humboldt State	2	–	3	–	0	6	–	5	–	0
Chico State	2	–	3	–	0	4	–	6	–	0
San Francisco State	2	–	3	–	0	3	–	7	–	0
Cal State Hayward	1	–	4	–	0	3	–	7	–	0
$ – Conference champion

1992 Northern California Athletic Conference football standings
	Conf.					Overall
Team	W		L		T	W		L		T
No. 7 UC Davis $^	5	–	0	–	0	8	–	2	–	1
Sonoma State	3	–	2	–	0	7	–	3	–	0
Humboldt State	3	–	2	–	0	7	–	4	–	0
Cal State Hayward	3	–	2	–	0	5	–	5	–	0
San Francisco State	1	–	4	–	0	2	–	7	–	0
Chico State	0	–	5	–	0	1	–	9	–	0
$ – Conference champion; ^ – NCAA Division II playoff participant; Rankings from NCAA Division II Football Committee poll

1993 Northern California Athletic Conference football standings
	Conf.					Overall
Team	W		L		T	W		L		T
Chico State $	3	–	0	–	1	4	–	4	–	1
Cal State Hayward	2	–	2	–	0	3	–	6	–	0
Sonoma State	2	–	2	–	0	2	–	7	–	0
Humboldt State	1	–	2	–	1	4	–	6	–	1
San Francisco State	1	–	3	–	0	3	–	7	–	0
$ – Conference champion

1994 Northern California Athletic Conference football standings
	Conf.					Overall
Team	W		L		T	W		L		T
Humboldt State +	2	–	1	–	0	8	–	2	–	0
Chico State +	2	–	1	–	0	3	–	6	–	0
Sonoma State +	2	–	1	–	0	3	–	7	–	0
San Francisco State	0	–	3	–	0	1	–	8	–	0
+ – Conference co-champions; The second Chico State vs. Sonoma State game did not count in conference standings.

1995 Northern California Athletic Conference football standings
	Conf.					Overall
Team	W		L		T	W		L		T
Humboldt State $	4	–	0	–	0	8	–	1	–	1
Chico State	1	–	2	–	1	2	–	5	–	2
Sonoma State	0	–	3	–	1	0	–	8	–	1
$ – Conference champion

1996 Northern California Athletic Conference football standings
	Conf.			Overall
Team	W		L	W		L
Chico State $	3	–	1	5	–	5
Sonoma State	2	–	2	2	–	8
Humboldt State	1	–	3	3	–	7
$ – Conference champion
