= 1983 Cal State Northridge Matadors football team =

American college football season

1983 Cal State Northridge Matadors football

WFC co-champion
- Conference: Western Football Conference
- Record: 6–4 (2–1 WFC)
- Head coach: Tom Keele (5th season)
- Defensive coordinator: Mark Banker (1st season)
- Home stadium: North Campus Stadium

1983 Western Football Conference standings
	Conf.					Overall
Team	W		L		T	W		L		T
Cal State Northridge +	2	–	1	–	0	6	–	4	–	0
Santa Clara +	2	–	1	–	0	6	–	4	–	0
Cal Poly	1	–	2	–	0	5	–	6	–	0
Portland State	1	–	2	–	0	3	–	7	–	0
+ – Conference co-champions

The 1983 Cal State Northridge Matadors football team represented California State University, Northridge as a member of the Western Football Conference (WFC) during the 1983 NCAA Division II football season. Led by fifth-year head coach Tom Keele, Cal State Northridge compiled an overall record of 6–4 with a mark of 2–1 in conference play, sharing the WFC title with Santa Clara. The team outscored its opponents 205 to 200 for the season. The Matadors played home games at North Campus Stadium in Northridge, California.

== Schedule ==
Date	Opponent	Site	Result	Attendance	Source
September 10	San Francisco State*	North Campus Stadium; Northridge, CA	W 24–3	350–2,419	
September 17	at Cal State Hayward*	Pioneer Stadium; Hayward, CA	L 16–28	200–586	
September 24	at Sacramento State*	Hornet Stadium; Sacramento, CA	W 20–14	4,050	
October 1	No. 9 UC Davis*	North Campus Stadium; Northridge, CA	L 3–31	3,144	
October 8	Chico State*	North Campus Stadium; Northridge, CA	W 24–14	644	
October 15	Cal Poly	North Campus Stadium; Northridge, CA	W 48–21	2,115	
October 22	Cal Lutheran*	North Campus Stadium; Northridge, CA	W 26–23	3,379	
October 29	at Portland State	Civic Stadium; Portland, OR	L 13–31	1,847	
November 5	Santa Clara	North Campus Stadium; Northridge, CA	W 24–22	4,808	
November 19	at Saint Mary's*	Saint Mary's Stadium; Moraga, CA	L 7–13	200–276	
*Non-conference game; Rankings from NCAA Division II Football Committee Poll released prior to the game
