= 1983 Santa Clara Broncos football team =

American college football season

1983 Santa Clara Broncos football

WFC co-champion
- Conference: Western Football Conference
- Record: 6–4 (2–1 WFC)
- Head coach: Pat Malley (25th season)
- Home stadium: Buck Shaw Stadium

1983 Western Football Conference standings
	Conf.					Overall
Team	W		L		T	W		L		T
Cal State Northridge +	2	–	1	–	0	6	–	4	–	0
Santa Clara +	2	–	1	–	0	6	–	4	–	0
Cal Poly	1	–	2	–	0	5	–	6	–	0
Portland State	1	–	2	–	0	3	–	7	–	0
+ – Conference co-champions

The 1983 Santa Clara Broncos football team represented Santa Clara University as a member of the Western Football Conference (WFC) during the 1983 NCAA Division II football season. The Broncos were led by head coach Pat Malley in his 25th year at the helm. They played home games at Buck Shaw Stadium in Santa Clara, California. The team finished the season as WFC co-champion, with a record of six wins and four losses (6–4, 2–1 WFC). The Broncos outscored their opponents 173–144 for the season.

== Schedule ==
Date	Opponent	Site	Result	Attendance	Source
September 17	at Humboldt State*	Redwood Bowl; Arcata, CA	W 17–7	3,350	
September 24	at Cal State Hayward*	Pioneer Stadium; Hayward, CA	L 15–17	1,200–2,000	
October 1	at San Francisco State*	Cox Stadium; San Francisco, CA	L 16–17	598	
October 8	Cal Lutheran*	Buck Shaw Stadium; Santa Clara, CA	W 22–20	4,417	
October 15	No. 4 UC Davis*	Buck Shaw Stadium; Santa Clara, CA	L 6–24	8,478	
October 22	Portland State	Buck Shaw Stadium; Santa Clara, CA	W 20–6	4,252	
October 29	Saint Mary's*	Buck Shaw Stadium; Santa Clara, CA	W 18–9	5,928	
November 5	at Cal State Northridge	North Campus Stadium; Northridge, CA	L 22–24	4,808	
November 12	Sonoma State*	Buck Shaw Stadium; Santa Clara, CA	W 10–0	840–1,500	
November 19	at Cal Poly	Mustang Stadium; San Luis Obispo, CA	W 27–20	3,145	
*Non-conference game; Rankings from NCAA Division II Football Committee Poll released prior to the game

== Team players in the NFL ==
The following Santa Clara Broncos players were selected in the 1984 NFL draft.

Player	Position	Round	Overall	NFL team
Gary Hoffman	Tackle	10	267	Green Bay Packers
