= Tom Keele =

American football player and coach (1933–2019)

Biographical details
- Born: August 20, 1933
- Died: November 5, 2019 (aged 86)

Playing career
- 1957–1959: Oregon
- Position: Tackle

Coaching career (HC unless noted)
- 1960–1961: North Eugene HS (OR) (assistant)
- 1962: Oregon City HS (OR)
- 1963: Sheldon HS (OR)
- 1965: Puget Sound (assistant)
- 1966–?: San Jose State (line)
- 1969–1973: Hawaii (assistant)
- 1974–1975: Washington State (assistant)
- 1976: BC Lions (DL)
- 1977–1978: Long Beach State (OC)
- 1979–1985: Cal State Northridge
- 1986: Weber State (LB)
- 1987–1991: California (OL)

Head coaching record
- Overall: 31–42–11 (college)

Accomplishments and honors

Championships
- 1 CCAA (1981); 1 WFC (1983)

Jack Thomas Keele (August 20, 1933 – November 5, 2019) was an American football coach. He served as the head football coach at California State University, Northridge from 1979 to 1985, compiling a record of 31–42–1. Keele graduated from Jefferson High School in Portland, Oregon in 1951. He attended the University of Oregon, where he played football for the Oregon Webfoots as a tackle from 1957 to 1959. Keele began his coaching career in 1960 at North Eugene High School in Eugene, Oregon, working two years as an assistant football coach and sophomore basketball coach. He moved to Oregon City High School in Oregon City, Oregon in 1962, serving as head football coach and leading his team to a 9–1–1 record. The following year, he was hired as head football coach at the newly-formed Sheldon High School in Eugene.

== Head coaching record ==
=== College ===
Year	Team	Overall	Conference	Standing	Bowl/playoffs
Cal State Northridge Matadors (California Collegiate Athletic Association) (1979–1981)
1979	Cal State Northridge	3–7	1–1	2nd	
1980	Cal State Northridge	5–6	1–1	2nd	
1981	Cal State Northridge	6–4–1	2–0	1st	
Cal State Northridge Matadors (Western Football Conference) (1982–1985)
1982	Cal State Northridge	4–7	2–2	3rd	
1983	Cal State Northridge	6–4	2–1	T–1st	
1984	Cal State Northridge	3–7	0–3	4th	
1985	Cal State Northridge	4–7	1–4	T–5th	
Cal State Northridge:		31–42–1	9–12		
Total:		31–42–1			
National championship Conference title Conference division title or championship game berth
