= 1983 Chico State Wildcats football team =

American college football season

1983 Chico State Wildcats football
- Conference: Northern California Athletic Conference
- Record: 4–5–1 (3–2–1 NCAC)
- Head coach: Dick Trimmer (10th season)
- Defensive coordinator: Mike Clemons (5th season)
- Home stadium: University Stadium

1983 Northern California Athletic Conference football standings
	Conf.					Overall
Team	W		L		T	W		L		T
No. 1 UC Davis $^	6	–	0	–	0	11	–	1	–	0
Sacramento State	4	–	1	–	1	5	–	5	–	1
Chico State	3	–	2	–	1	4	–	5	–	1
Cal State Hayward	3	–	3	–	0	6	–	4	–	0
Humboldt State	3	–	3	–	0	4	–	6	–	0
San Francisco State	1	–	5	–	0	2	–	8	–	0
Sonoma State	0	–	6	–	0	2	–	9	–	0
$ – Conference champion; ^ – NCAA Division II playoff participant; Rankings from NCAA Division II Football Committee poll

The 1983 Chico State Wildcats football team represented California State University, Chico as a member of the Northern California Athletic Conference (NCAC) during the 1983 NCAA Division II football season. Led by Dick Trimmer in his tenth and final season as head coach, Chico State compiled an overall record of 4–5–1 with a mark of 3–2–1 in conference play, placing third in the NCAC. The team outscored its opponents 227 to 201 for the season. The Wildcats played home games at University Stadium in Chico, California.

Trimmer resigned in December 1983. He finished his tenure at Chico State with an overall record of 48–52–2, for a .480 winning percentage.

== Schedule ==
Date	Opponent	Site	Result	Attendance	Source
September 10	at Saint Mary's*	Saint Mary's Stadium; Moraga, CA	L 25–39	3,122	
September 17	Cal Poly*	University Stadium; Chico, CA	L 9–21	3,942	
September 24	Claremont-Mudd*	University Stadium; Chico, CA	W 41–9	2,000–2,612	
October 8	at Cal State Northridge*	North Campus Stadium; Northridge, CA	L 14–24	644	
October 15	at Sonoma State	Cossacks Stadium; Rohnert Park, CA	W 50–29	624–960	
October 22	No. 3 UC Davis	University Stadium; Chico, CA	L 7–24	7,342	
October 29	at Sacramento State	Hornet Stadium; Sacramento, CA	T 15–15	1,200	
November 5	Humboldt State	University Stadium; Chico, CA	L 20–26	500–900	
November 12	at Cal State Hayward	Pioneer Stadium; Hayward, CA	W 20–7	400–605	
November 19	San Francisco State	University Stadium; Chico, CA	W 26–7	400–421	
*Non-conference game; Rankings from NCAA Division II Football Committee Poll released prior to the game
