= 1983 San Francisco State Gators football team =

American college football season

1983 San Francisco State Gators football
- Conference: Northern California Athletic Conference
- Record: 2–8 (1–5 NCAC)
- Head coach: Vic Rowen (23rd season)
- Home stadium: Cox Stadium

1983 Northern California Athletic Conference football standings
	Conf.					Overall
Team	W		L		T	W		L		T
No. 1 UC Davis $^	6	–	0	–	0	11	–	1	–	0
Sacramento State	4	–	1	–	1	5	–	5	–	1
Chico State	3	–	2	–	1	4	–	5	–	1
Cal State Hayward	3	–	3	–	0	6	–	4	–	0
Humboldt State	3	–	3	–	0	4	–	6	–	0
San Francisco State	1	–	5	–	0	2	–	8	–	0
Sonoma State	0	–	6	–	0	2	–	9	–	0
$ – Conference champion; ^ – NCAA Division II playoff participant; Rankings from NCAA Division II Football Committee poll

The 1983 San Francisco State Gators football team represented San Francisco State University as a member of the Northern California Athletic Conference (NCAC) during the 1983 NCAA Division II football season. Led by 23rd-year head coach Vic Rowen, San Francisco State compiled an overall record of 2–8 with a mark of 1–5 in conference play, placing sixth in the NCAC. For the season the team was outscored by its opponents 251 to 116. The Gators played home games at Cox Stadium in San Francisco.

== Schedule ==
Date	Opponent	Site	Result	Attendance	Source
September 10	at Cal State Northridge*	North Campus Stadium; Northridge, CA	L 3–24	350–2,419	
September 17	Sonoma State	Cox Stadium; San Francisco, CA	W 31–6	350–400	
September 24	Cal Poly*	Cox Stadium; San Francisco, CA	L 8–50	575	
October 1	Santa Clara*	Cox Stadium; San Francisco, CA	W 17–16	598	
October 8	Cal State Hayward	Cox Stadium; San Francisco, CA	L 7–13	500–584	
October 15	Saint Mary's*	Cox Stadium; San Francisco, CA	L 0–16	532	
October 29	at No. 2 UC Davis	Toomey Field; Davis, CA	L 9–41	7,500–7,800	
November 5	Sacramento State	Cox Stadium; San Francisco, CA	L 25–37	600	
November 12	at Humboldt State	Redwood Bowl; Arcata, CA	L 9–22	500	
November 19	at Chico State	University Stadium; Chico, CA	L 7–26	400–421	
*Non-conference game; Rankings from NCAA Division II Football Committee Poll released prior to the game
