= Cal State Northridge Matadors football =

American college football team

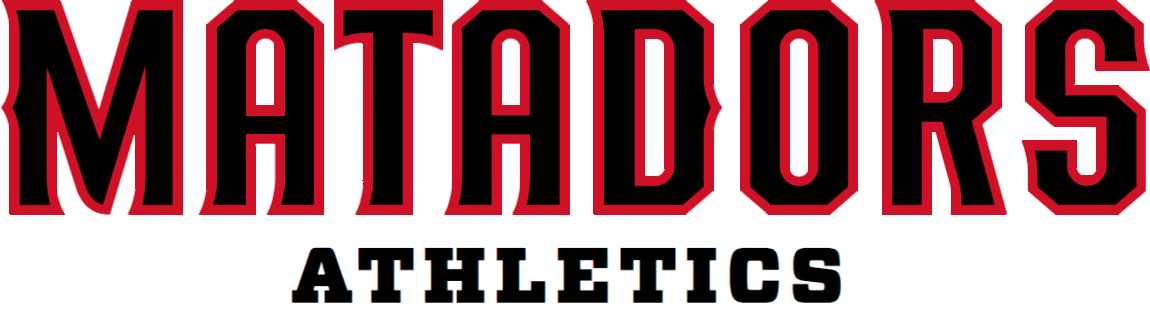
- First season: 1962; 64 years ago
- Last season: 2001; 25 years ago
- Stadium: Devonshire Downs (capacity: 6,500)
- Location: Northridge, California
- NCAA division: Division I-AA (1993–2001); Division II (1973–1992); College Division (1962–1972)
- All-time record: 182–231–4 (.441)
- Bowl record: 0–1 (.000)

Conference championships
- 3
- Colors: Red, white, and black
- Website: GoMatadors.com

The Cal State Northridge Matadors football team represented California State University, Northridge in the sport of American football from the 1962 through 2001 seasons. Between 1962 and 1992, Cal State Northridge competed at the NCAA Division II level prior to moving to Division I-AA in 1993. The Matadors played their home games at multiple stadiums throughout their history, with the most recent being North Campus Stadium in Northridge, California.

Until 1972, the school's name was "San Fernando Valley State College." The team disbanded after 2001 due to budget concerns, with the cost of the program ($1.3 million per year) outweighing a department that was thousands of dollars in the red. The scholarships were honored by the school.

== Yearly records ==
Year	Coach	Overall	Conference	Standing	Bowl/playoffs
California Collegiate Athletic Association (1962–1981)
1962	Sam Winningham	3–6	0–0	NA	
1963	Sam Winningham	2–6	0–0	NA	
1964	Sam Winningham	4–6	1–3	T–4th	
1965	Sam Winningham	1–9	0–4	6th	
1966	Sam Winningham	2–7–1	0–5	6th	
1967	Sam Winningham	6–4	3–2	T–2nd	L Pasadena Bowl
1968	Sam Winningham	5–4	1–3	T–4th	
1969	Leon McLaughlin	4–5	1–1	2nd	
1970	Leon McLaughlin	4–6	1–2	3rd	
1971	Rod Humenuik	4–7	1–2	3rd	
1972	Rod Humenuik	6–5	1–3	4th	
1973	Gary Torgeson	2–9	1–3	T–3rd	
1974	Gary Torgeson	2–9	1–3	4th	
1975	Gary Torgeson	4–6–1	1–3	4th	
1976	Jack Elway	8–3	0–2	3rd	
1977	Jack Elway	7–3–1	1–1	2nd	
1978	Jack Elway	5–5	0–2	3rd	
1979	Tom Keele	3–7	1–1	2nd	
1980	Tom Keele	5–6	1–1	2nd	
1981	Tom Keele	6–4–1	2–0	1st	
CCAA:		83–117–4			
Western Football Conference (1982–1992)
1982	Tom Keele	4–7	2–2	3rd	
1983	Tom Keele	6–4	2–1	T–1st	
1984	Tom Keele	2–8	0–3	4th	
1985	Tom Keele	4–7	1–4	T–5th	
1986	Bob Burt	8–3	4–2	T–2nd	
1987	Bob Burt	7–4	4–2	2nd	
1988	Bob Burt	6–5	2–4	T–5th	
1989	Bob Burt	6–5	3–2	T–2nd	
1990	Bob Burt	7–4	4–1	T–1st	L NCAA Division II First Round
1991	Bob Burt	3–7	1–4	5th	
1992	Bob Burt	5–5	2–2	3rd	
WFC:		58–59	25–27		
American West Conference (1993–1995)
1993	Bob Burt	4–6	1–3	T–4th	
1994	Bob Burt	3–7	0–3	4th	
1995	Dave Baldwin	2–8	1–2	3rd	
AWC:		9–21	2–8		
Big Sky Conference (1996–2000)
1996	Dave Baldwin	7–4	5–3	T–3rd	
1997	Jim Fenwick	6–6	4–4	T–4th	
1998	Ron Ponciano	7–4	5–3	T–2nd	
1999	Jeff Kearin	5–6	4–4	5th	
2000	Jeff Kearin	4–7	2–6	T–7th	
Big Sky:		29–27	20–20		
Division I-AA Independent (2001)
2001	Jeff Kearin	3–7			
Total:		182–231–4			
National championship Conference title Conference division title or championship game berth

== Conference championships ==
The Matadors won three conference championships in their time playing college football.

Season	Coach	Conference	Overall Record	Conference Record
1981	Tom Keele	California Collegiate Athletic Association	6–4–1	2–0
1983†	Tom Keele	Western Football Conference	6–4	2–1
1990†	Bob Burt	Western Football Conference	7–4	4–1

† denotes shared championship.

== Playoff appearances ==
=== NCAA Division II playoffs ===
The Matadors made one appearance in the Division II playoffs, with a combined record of 0-1.

Year	Round	Opponent	Result
1990	First Round	Cal Poly	L, 7–14

== Notable players ==
- Sherdrick Bonner
- Joe Rice
- Eric Treibatch
- Lon Boyett
- Daved Benefield
- Marcus Brady
- D.J. Hackett
- Armando Diaz
- Aaron Arnold
- Doug Jones (American football)
- Chris Parker
- Alo Sila
- Bryan Wagner
- Keith Watkins
- Bruce Lemmerman
- Melvin Wilson
- Andrew Amerson
- Derek Sage
- Pat Cerruti
- Kip Dukes
- Mario Hull
- Tyrone Thomas Peterson
