= 1983 Cal Poly Mustangs football team =

American college football season

1983 Cal Poly Mustangs football
- Conference: Western Football Conference
- Record: 5–6 (1–2 WFC)
- Head coach: Jim Sanderson (2nd season)
- Home stadium: Mustang Stadium

1983 Western Football Conference standings
	Conf.					Overall
Team	W		L		T	W		L		T
Cal State Northridge +	2	–	1	–	0	6	–	4	–	0
Santa Clara +	2	–	1	–	0	6	–	4	–	0
Cal Poly	1	–	2	–	0	5	–	6	–	0
Portland State	1	–	2	–	0	3	–	7	–	0
+ – Conference co-champions

The 1983 Cal Poly Mustangs football team represented California Polytechnic State University, San Luis Obispo as a member of the Western Football Conference (WFC) during the 1983 NCAA Division II football season. Led by second-year head coach Jim Sanderson, Cal Poly compiled an overall record of 5–6 with a mark of 1–2 in conference play, tying for third place in the WFC. The team was outscored by its opponents 249 to 248 for the season. The Mustangs played home games at Mustang Stadium in San Luis Obispo, California.

== Schedule ==
Date	Opponent	Rank	Site	Result	Attendance	Source
September 10	at Sacramento State*		Hornet Stadium; Sacramento, CA	W 38–15	7,360	
September 17	at Chico State*		University Stadium; Chico, CA	W 21–9	3,942	
September 24	at San Francisco State*	No. 5	Cox Stadium; San Francisco, CA	W 50–8	575	
October 1	at Boise State*	No. 5	Bronco Stadium; Boise, ID	L 3–27	15,738	
October 8	No. 4 UC Davis*	No. T–10	Mustang Stadium; San Luis Obispo, CA (rivalry)	L 14–24	4,933	
October 15	Cal State Northridge		Devonshire Downs; Northridge, CA	L 21–48	2,115	
October 22	No. 9 (I-AA) Idaho State*		Mustang Stadium; San Luis Obispo, CA	W 44–37	5,262	
October 29	Fresno State*		Mustang Stadium; San Luis Obispo, CA	L 7–30	25,712	
November 5	Southern Connecticut State*		Mustang Stadium; San Luis Obispo, CA	L 14–17	2,686	
November 12	Portland State		Mustang Stadium; San Luis Obispo, CA	W 16–7	1,792	
November 19	Santa Clara		Mustang Stadium; San Luis Obispo, CA	L 20–27	3,145	
*Non-conference game; Rankings from NCAA Division II Football Committee Poll released prior to the game

== Team players in the NFL ==
The following Cal Poly Mustang players were selected in the 1984 NFL draft.

Player	Position	Round	Overall	NFL team
Paul Sverchek	Nose tackle	8	208	Minnesota Vikings
