= 1983 Sam Houston State Bearkats football team =

American college football season

1983 Sam Houston State Bearkats football
- Conference: Lone Star Conference
- Record: 4–7 (1–6 LSC)
- Head coach: Ron Randleman (2nd season)
- Home stadium: Pritchett Field

1983 Lone Star Conference football standings
	Conf.					Overall
Team	W		L		T	W		L		T
No. 2 Southwest Texas State +^	6	–	1	–	0	9	–	2	–	0
East Texas State +	6	–	1	–	0	8	–	2	–	0
Stephen F. Austin	5	–	2	–	0	7	–	4	–	0
Abilene Christian	4	–	3	–	0	7	–	3	–	0
Angelo State	3	–	4	–	0	5	–	6	–	0
Texas A&I	2	–	5	–	0	2	–	9	–	0
Sam Houston State	1	–	6	–	0	4	–	7	–	0
Howard Payne	1	–	6	–	0	2	–	8	–	0
+ – Conference co-champions; ^ – NCAA Division II playoff participant; Rankings from NCAA Division II Football Committee poll

The 1983 Sam Houston State Bearkats football team represented Sam Houston State University as a member of the Lone Star Conference (LSC) during the 1983 NCAA Division II football season. Led by second-year head coach Ron Randleman, the Bearkats compiled an overall record of 4–7 with a mark of 1–6 in conference play, and finished tied for seventh in the LSC.

== Schedule ==
Date	Opponent	Site	Result	Attendance	Source
September 10	at Bishop*	Tiger Stadium; Dallas, TX	W 27–14	3,000	
September 17	at Central Missouri*	West Campus Field; Warrensburg, MO	L 10–13	5,200	
September 24	Southwestern Oklahoma State*	Pritchett Field; Huntsville, TX	W 52–15	5,000	
October 1	Texas Lutheran*	Pritchett Field; Huntsville, TX	W 14–7	5,100	
October 8	at East Texas State	Memorial Stadium; Commerce, TX	L 14–51	7,000	
October 15	at No. 1 Southwest Texas State	Bobcat Stadium; San Marcos, TX (rivalry)	L 10–26	11,879	
October 22	vs. Texas A&I	Houston Astrodome; Houston, TX	L 14–19	5,000	
October 29	at Howard Payne	Cen-Tex Stadium; Brownwood, TX	W 20–10	4,000	
November 5	Abilene Christian	Pritchett Field; Huntsville, TX	L 20–27	6,000	
November 12	Angelo State	Pritchett Field; Huntsville, TX	L 12–21	2,000	
November 19	at Stephen F. Austin	Lumberjack Stadium; Nacogdoches, TX (rivalry)	L 10–27	1,500	
*Non-conference game; Rankings from NCAA Division II Football Committee Poll released prior to the game
