= 1983 Sacramento State Hornets football team =

American college football season

1983 Sacramento State Hornets football
- Conference: Northern California Athletic Conference
- Record: 5–5–1 (4–1–1 NCAC)
- Head coach: Bob Mattos (6th season)
- Home stadium: Hornet Stadium

1983 Northern California Athletic Conference football standings
	Conf.					Overall
Team	W		L		T	W		L		T
No. 1 UC Davis $^	6	–	0	–	0	11	–	1	–	0
Sacramento State	4	–	1	–	1	5	–	5	–	1
Chico State	3	–	2	–	1	4	–	5	–	1
Cal State Hayward	3	–	3	–	0	6	–	4	–	0
Humboldt State	3	–	3	–	0	4	–	6	–	0
San Francisco State	1	–	5	–	0	2	–	8	–	0
Sonoma State	0	–	6	–	0	2	–	9	–	0
$ – Conference champion; ^ – NCAA Division II playoff participant; Rankings from NCAA Division II Football Committee poll

The 1983 Sacramento State Hornets football team represented California State University, Sacramento as a member of the Northern California Athletic Conference (NCAC) during the 1983 NCAA Division II football season. Led by sixth-year head coach Bob Mattos, Sacramento State compiled an overall record of 5–5–1 with a mark of 4–1–1 in conference play, placing second in the NCAC. The team outscored its opponents 258 to 245 for the season. The Hornets played home games at Hornet Stadium in Sacramento, California.

== Schedule ==
Date	Opponent	Site	Result	Attendance	Source
September 3	at Sonoma State	Cossacks Stadium; Rohnert Park, CA	W 35–7	1,900	
September 10	Cal Poly*	Hornet Stadium; Sacramento, CA	L 15–38	7,360	
September 17	at Portland State*	Civic Stadium; Portland, OR	L 16–25	2,034	
September 24	Cal State Northridge*	Hornet Stadium; Sacramento, CA	L 14–20	4,050	
October 8	at Saint Mary's*	Saint Mary's Stadium; Moraga, CA	L 15–23	4,745	
October 15	at Cal Lutheran*	Mt. Clef Field; Thousand Oaks, CA	W 42–14	1,600	
October 22	at Humboldt State	Redwood Bowl; Arcata, CA	W 35–20	2,850	
October 29	Chico State	Hornet Stadium; Sacramento, CA	T 15–15	1,200	
November 5	at San Francisco State	Cox Stadium; San Francisco, CA	W 37–25	600	
November 12	No. T–1 UC Davis	Hornet Stadium; Sacramento, CA (Causeway Classic)	L 14–52	7,650	
November 19	Cal State Hayward	Hornet Stadium; Sacramento, CA	W 20–6	550–1,600	
*Non-conference game; Rankings from NCAA Division II Football Committee Poll released prior to the game

== Team players in the NFL ==
The following Sacramento State players were selected in the 1984 NFL draft.

Player	Position	Round	Overall	NFL team
John Farley	Running back	4	92	Cincinnati Bengals
