= 1983 Central State Marauders football team =

American college football season

1983 Central State Marauders football

Black college national champion

NCAA Division II Championship, L 21–41 vs. North Dakota State
- Conference: Independent
- Record: 12–1
- Head coach: Billy Joe (3rd season)
- Home stadium: McPherson Stadium

1983 NCAA Division II independents football records
	Conf.			Overall
Team	W	L	T	W		L		T
No. 7 Central State (OH) ^		–		12	–	1	–	0
No. 4 Towson State ^		–		10	–	2	–	0
Northern Michigan		–		8	–	2	–	0
Saint Mary's		–		8	–	2	–	0
Southern Connecticut State		–		8	–	2	–	0
Eastern Washington		–		5	–	5	–	0
UCF		–		5	–	6	–	0
Central Connecticut		–		4	–	6	–	0
American International		–		4	–	7	–	0
Springfield		–		3	–	7	–	0
Kentucky State		–		2	–	7	–	2
Morgan State		–		2	–	8	–	0
Liberty		–		2	–	9	–	0
New Haven		–		1	–	9	–	0
^ – NCAA Division II playoff participant; Rankings from NCAA Division II Football Committee poll

The 1983 Central State Marauders football team represented Central State University as an independent during the 1983 NCAA Division II football season. Led by third-year head coach Billy Joe, the Marauders compiled an overall record of 12–1 and finished as Division II runner-up. At the conclusion of the season, the Marauders were also recognized as black college national champion.

== Schedule ==
Date	Opponent	Rank	Site	Result	Attendance	Source
September 10	Salem (WV)		McPherson Stadium; Wilberforce, OH	W 33–7	1,300	
September 17	at Ferris State		Top Taggart Field; Big Rapids, MI	W 48–32	12,500	
September 24	Grand Valley State		McPherson Stadium; Wilberforce, OH	W 21–14	3,183–4,500	
October 1	Liberty Baptist		McPherson Stadium; Wilberforce, OH	W 66–16	4,700	
October 8	Lincoln (MO)		McPherson Stadium; Wilberforce, OH	W 50–12	13,700	
October 15	at Kentucky State		Alumni Field; Frankfort, KY	W 23–3	8,500	
October 22	at Northeastern Illinois		Skokie, IL	W 24–0	100	
October 29	District of Columbia		McPherson Stadium; Wilberforce, OH	W 69–8	5,500	
November 5	No. 17 Delaware State		McPherson Stadium; Wilberforce, OH	W 49–26	4,500	
November 12	Clarion State	No. 9	McPherson Stadium; Wilberforce, OH	W 48–14	5,500	
November 26	at No. 2 Southwest Texas State	No. 7	Bobcat Stadium; San Marcos, TX (NCAA Division II First Round)	W 24–16		
December 3	at No. 3 North Alabama	No. 7	Braly Municipal Stadium; Florence, AL (NCAA Division II Semifinal)	W 27–24		
December 10	vs. No. 6 North Dakota State	No. 7	McAllen Veterans Memorial Stadium; McAllen, TX (NCAA Division II Championship Game—Palm Bowl)	L 21–41		
Rankings from AP Poll released prior to the game
