= 1983 Southwest Texas State Bobcats football team =

American college football season

1983 Southwest Texas State Bobcats football

LSC co-champion

NCAA Division II Quarterfinal, L 16–24 vs. Central State (OH)
- Conference: Lone Star Conference
- Record: 9–2 (6–1 LSC)
- Head coach: John O'Hara (1st season)
- Home stadium: Bobcat Stadium

1983 Lone Star Conference football standings
	Conf.					Overall
Team	W		L		T	W		L		T
No. 2 Southwest Texas State +^	6	–	1	–	0	9	–	2	–	0
East Texas State +	6	–	1	–	0	8	–	2	–	0
Stephen F. Austin	5	–	2	–	0	7	–	4	–	0
Abilene Christian	4	–	3	–	0	7	–	3	–	0
Angelo State	3	–	4	–	0	5	–	6	–	0
Texas A&I	2	–	5	–	0	2	–	9	–	0
Sam Houston State	1	–	6	–	0	4	–	7	–	0
Howard Payne	1	–	6	–	0	2	–	8	–	0
+ – Conference co-champions; ^ – NCAA Division II playoff participant; Rankings from NCAA Division II Football Committee poll

The 1983 Southwest Texas State Bobcats football team was an American football team that represented Southwest Texas State University (now known as Texas State University) during the 1983 NCAA Division II football season as a member of the Lone Star Conference (LSC). In their first year under head coach John O'Hara, the team compiled an overall record of 9–2, with a mark of 6–1 in conference play, finished as LSC co-champion, and with a loss against Central State in the NCAA Division II Quarterfinals.

== Schedule ==
Date	Opponent	Rank	Site	Result	Attendance	Source
September 10	Prairie View A&M*		Bobcat Stadium; San Marcos, TX	W 46–7	11,533	
September 24	at Texas A&I	No. 1	Javelina Stadium; Kingsville, TX	W 28–0	11,200	
October 1	at Howard Payne	No. 1	Gordon Wood Stadium; Brownwood, TX	W 44–9	2,300	
October 8	Northwestern State*	No. 1	Bobcat Stadium; San Marcos, TX	W 16–14	12,881	
October 15	Sam Houston State	No. 1	Bobcat Stadium; San Marcos, TX (rivalry)	W 26–10	11,879	
October 22	at Stephen F. Austin	No. 1	Lumberjack Stadium; Nacogdoches, TX	L 24–27	13,300–14,000	
October 29	No. 10 East Texas State	No. 5	Bobcat Stadium; San Marcos, TX	W 44–21	14,616	
November 5	at Angelo State	No. T–1	San Angelo Stadium; San Angelo, TX	W 20–0	1,600–5,500	
November 12	at Abilene Christian	No. T–1	Shotwell Stadium; Abilene, TX	W 54–13	10,500	
November 19	Texas A&I	No. 2	Bobcat Stadium; San Marcos, TX	W 40–3	12,480	
November 26	No. 7 Central State (OH)*	No. 2	Bobcat Stadium; San Marcos, TX	L 16–24		
*Non-conference game; Rankings from NCAA Division II Football Committee Poll released prior to the game
