= Don Morton =

American football player and coach

Biographical details
- Born: April 10, 1947 (age 79); Flint, Michigan, U.S.

Playing career
- 1966–1968: Augustana (IL)
- Position: Center

Coaching career (HC unless noted)
- 1969–1970: Moline HS (IL) (assistant)
- 1971–1976: Augustana (SD) (OC/OL)
- 1977–1978: North Dakota State (backfield)
- 1979–1984: North Dakota State
- 1985–1986: Tulsa
- 1987–1989: Wisconsin

Head coaching record
- Overall: 76–51
- Tournaments: 8–3 (NCAA D-II playoffs)

Accomplishments and honors

Championships
- 1 NCAA Division II (1983); 4 NCC (1981–1984); 1 MVC (1985)

Don Morton (born April 10, 1947) is an American former football player, coach, and software executive. He served as the head football coach at North Dakota State University (1979–1984), the University of Tulsa (1985–1986), and the University of Wisconsin–Madison (1987–1989), compiling a career college football record of 76–51. Morton's 1983 North Dakota State team won an NCAA Division II Football Championship.

== Playing career and education ==
A native of Flint, Michigan, Morton played center at Augustana College in Rock Island, Illinois in the late 1960s and earned a Bachelor of Arts degree in psychology in 1969. He later earned a Master of Arts degree in education and administration from Western Illinois University in 1974.

== Coaching career ==
Morton began his professional career in 1969 as assistant football and head wrestling coach at Moline High School in Illinois, and served there through 1971. His successes at Moline High earned him his first collegiate position as offensive line coach and offensive coordinator at Augustana College in Sioux Falls, South Dakota from 1971 to 1976. He then moved on to North Dakota State University as offensive backfield coach from 1977 to 1978 and was named head coach there in 1979.

Nearing the end of his failed stint at Wisconsin, Morton, on his coaches' show, emerged from a coffin to declare that he wasn't dead yet.

== Later years ==
A few years after his tenure as head football coach at Wisconsin, Morton returned to North Dakota State as the Assistant to the President and Director of University Relations. He later joined Great Plains Software as chief of staff for CEO Doug Burgum. Morton became an employee of Microsoft Corporation through the acquisition of Great Plains in 2001. Morton was the site leader for the Microsoft campus in Fargo, North Dakota. Morton is now retired from Microsoft.

== Head coaching record ==
Year	Team	Overall	Conference	Standing	Bowl/playoffs	NCAA^{#}
North Dakota State Bison (North Central Conference) (1979–1984)
1979	North Dakota State	6–4	4–2	T–2nd		
1980	North Dakota State	6–4	5–2	T–2nd		
1981	North Dakota State	10–3	7–0	1st	L NCAA Division II Championship	6
1982	North Dakota State	12–1	7–0	1st	L NCAA Division II Semifinal	2
1983	North Dakota State	12–1	8–1	T–1st	W NCAA Division II Championship	5
1984	North Dakota State	11–2	8–1	T–1st	L NCAA Division II Championship	1
North Dakota State:		57–15	39–6			
Tulsa Golden Hurricane (Missouri Valley Conference) (1985)
1985	Tulsa	6–5	5–0	1st		
Tulsa Golden Hurricane (NCAA Division I-A independent) (1986)
1986	Tulsa	7–4				
Tulsa:		13–9	5–0			
Wisconsin Badgers (Big Ten Conference) (1987–1989)
1987	Wisconsin	3–8	1–7	10th		
1988	Wisconsin	1–10	1–7	10th		
1989	Wisconsin	2–9	1–7	9th		
Wisconsin:		6–27	3–21			
Total:		76–51				
National championship Conference title Conference division title or championship game berth
