= 1983 East Texas State Lions football team =

American college football season

1983 East Texas State Lions football

LSC co-champion
- Conference: Lone Star Conference
- Record: 8–2 (6–1 LSC)
- Head coach: Ernest Hawkins (20th season)
- Offensive scheme: Option
- Defensive coordinator: Eddie Vowell (1st season)
- Base defense: 4–3
- Home stadium: Memorial Stadium

1983 Lone Star Conference football standings
	Conf.					Overall
Team	W		L		T	W		L		T
No. 2 Southwest Texas State +^	6	–	1	–	0	9	–	2	–	0
East Texas State +	6	–	1	–	0	8	–	2	–	0
Stephen F. Austin	5	–	2	–	0	7	–	4	–	0
Abilene Christian	4	–	3	–	0	7	–	3	–	0
Angelo State	3	–	4	–	0	5	–	6	–	0
Texas A&I	2	–	5	–	0	2	–	9	–	0
Sam Houston State	1	–	6	–	0	4	–	7	–	0
Howard Payne	1	–	6	–	0	2	–	8	–	0
+ – Conference co-champions; ^ – NCAA Division II playoff participant; Rankings from NCAA Division II Football Committee poll

The 1983 East Texas State Lions football team represented East Texas State University—now known as Texas A&M University–Commerce—as a member of the Lone Star Conference (LSC) during the 1983 NCAA Division II football season. Led by 19th-year head coach Ernest Hawkins, the Lions compiled an overall record of 8–2 with a mark of 6–1 in conference play, sharing the LSC title with Southwest Texas State. It was the team's final LSC title under Hawkins, who retired at the end of the 1985 season. East Texas State played home games at Memorial Stadium in Commerce, Texas

== Schedule ==
Date	Time	Opponent	Rank	Site	Result	Attendance	Source
September 10	2:00 pm	Cameron*		Memorial Stadium; Commerce, TX	W 38–27	3,500	
September 17	6:00 pm	at Southern Arkansas*		Wilkins Stadium; Magnolia, AR	W 24–15	4,500	
September 24	5:00 pm	at Southeastern Louisiana*		Strawberry Stadium; Hammond, LA	L 31–23	6,500	
October 8	6:00 pm	Sam Houston State		Memorial Stadium; Commerce, TX	W 51–14	7,000	
October 15	2:00 pm	at Howard Payne		Yellowjacket Stadium; Brownwood, TX	W 24–0	3,000	
October 22	2:00 pm	Abilene Christian		Memorial Stadium; Commerce, TX	W 31–28	5,500	
October 29	2:00 pm	at No. 5 Southwest Texas State	No. 10	Bobcat Stadium; San Marcos, TX	L 44–21	14,616	
November 5	2:00 pm	Texas A&I		Memorial Stadium; Commerce, TX	W 35–24		
November 12	6:00 pm	Stephen F. Austin State		Memorial Stadium; Commerce, TX	W 23–21	7,500	
November 19	2:00 pm	at Angelo State		San Angelo Stadium; San Angelo, TX	W 27–3	1,500	
*Non-conference game; Rankings from NCAA Division II Football Committee Poll released prior to the game; All times are in Central time

== Postseason awards ==
=== All-Americans ===
- Ricky Dirks, Second Team, running back

=== Lone Star Conference superlatives ===
- Coach of the Year: Ernest Hawkins
- Outstanding Back of the Year: Kyle Mackey

=== All-Lone Star Conference ===
==== LSC First Team ====
- Javier Cardenas, tight end
- Ricky Dirks, running back
- Alan Veingrad, offensive tackle

==== LSC Second Team ====
- Chris Flynn, defensive back
- Vince Murray, defensive back
- Gaylon Surratt, defensive back
- Kyle Mackey, quarterback
