= 1983 Humboldt State Lumberjacks football team =

American college football season

1983 Humboldt State Lumberjacks football
- Conference: Northern California Athletic Conference
- Record: 4–6 (3–3 NCAC)
- Head coach: Bud Van Deren (18th season)
- Home stadium: Redwood Bowl

1983 Northern California Athletic Conference football standings
	Conf.					Overall
Team	W		L		T	W		L		T
No. 1 UC Davis $^	6	–	0	–	0	11	–	1	–	0
Sacramento State	4	–	1	–	1	5	–	5	–	1
Chico State	3	–	2	–	1	4	–	5	–	1
Cal State Hayward	3	–	3	–	0	6	–	4	–	0
Humboldt State	3	–	3	–	0	4	–	6	–	0
San Francisco State	1	–	5	–	0	2	–	8	–	0
Sonoma State	0	–	6	–	0	2	–	9	–	0
$ – Conference champion; ^ – NCAA Division II playoff participant; Rankings from NCAA Division II Football Committee poll

The 1983 Humboldt State Lumberjacks football team represented Humboldt State University—now known as California State Polytechnic University, Humboldt—as a member of the Northern California Athletic Conference (NCAC) during the 1983 NCAA Division II football season. Led by 18th-year head coach Bud Van Deren, the Lumberjacks compiled an overall record of 4–6 with a mark of 3–3 in conference play, tying for fourth place in the NCAC. The team was outscored by its opponents 203 to 157 for the season. Humboldt State played home games at the Redwood Bowl in Arcata, California.

== Schedule ==
Date	Opponent	Site	Result	Attendance	Source
September 10	at Southern Oregon*	Fuller Field; Ashland, OR	L 19–28	1,675	
September 17	Santa Clara*	Redwood Bowl; Arcata, CA	L 7–17	3,150	
September 24	at No. 10 UC Davis	Toomey Field; Davis, CA	L 0–34	7,100–7,200	
October 1	at Sonoma State	Cossacks Stadium (Note: Seawolf Stadium was known as Cossacks Stadium until 2002 when the University changed the mascot from Cossacks to Seawolves.); Rohnert Park, CA	W 13–6	1,500–2,000	
October 8	British Columbia*	Redwood Bowl; Arcata, CA	W 21–0	2,000	
October 15	at Portland State*	Civic Stadium; Portland, OR	L 26–44	1,853	
October 22	Sacramento State	Redwood Bowl; Arcata, CA	L 20–35	2,850	
October 29	at Cal State Hayward	Pioneer Stadium; Hayward, CA	L 3–10	450–1,100	
November 5	at Chico State	University Stadium; Chico, CA	W 26–20	500–900	
November 12	San Francisco State	Redwood Bowl; Arcata, CA	W 22–9	500	
*Non-conference game; Rankings from NCAA Division II Football Committee Poll released prior to the game
