= 1983 North Dakota State Bison football team =

American college football season

1983 North Dakota State Bison football

NCAA Division II champion NCC champion

NCAA Division II Championship Game, W 41–21 vs.Central State (OH)
- Conference: North Central Conference
- Record: 12–1 (8–1 NCC)
- Head coach: Don Morton (5th season)
- Defensive coordinator: Mike Daly (5th season)
- Home stadium: Dacotah Field

1983 North Central Conference football standings
| | Conf. | | | | | Overall |
| Team | W | | L | | T | W | | L | | T |
|---|---|---|---|---|---|---|---|---|---|---|
| No. 5 North Dakota State +^ | 8 | – | 1 | – | 0 | 12 | – | 1 | – | 0 |
| No. 10 Nebraska–Omaha + | 8 | – | 1 | – | 0 | 9 | – | 2 | – | 0 |
| South Dakota | 6 | – | 3 | – | 0 | 7 | – | 4 | – | 0 |
| Augustana (SD) | 4 | – | 5 | – | 0 | 5 | – | 6 | – | 0 |
| Northern Colorado | 4 | – | 5 | – | 0 | 4 | – | 6 | – | 0 |
| North Dakota | 4 | – | 5 | – | 0 | 6 | – | 5 | – | 0 |
| St. Cloud State | 4 | – | 5 | – | 0 | 5 | – | 6 | – | 0 |
| Mankato State | 3 | – | 6 | – | 0 | 4 | – | 7 | – | 0 |
| South Dakota State | 3 | – | 6 | – | 0 | 5 | – | 6 | – | 0 |
| Morningside | 1 | – | 8 | – | 0 | 1 | – | 10 | – | 0 |
+ – Conference co-champions; ^ – NCAA Division II playoff participant; Rankings from NCAA Division II Football Committee poll

The 1983 North Dakota State football team represented North Dakota State University during the 1983 NCAA Division II football season, and completed the 87th season of Bison football. The Bison played their home games at Dacotah Field in Fargo, North Dakota. The 1983 team came off a 12–1 record from the previous season. The 1983 team was led by coach Don Morton. The team finished the regular season with a 9–1 record and made the NCAA Division II playoffs. The Bison defeated the Central State Marauders, 41–21, in the National Championship Game en route to the program's first NCAA Division II Football Championship.

== Schedule ==
| Date | Opponent | Rank | Site | Result | Attendance | Source |
|---|---|---|---|---|---|---|
| September 3 | at Northern Michigan* | | Memorial Field; Marquette, MI | W 17–14 | 5,602 | |
| September 17 | at Mankato State | | Blakeslee Stadium; Mankato, MN | W 10–9 | 4,000 | |
| September 24 | Augustana (SD) | No. 3 | Dacotah Field; Fargo, ND | W 20–6 | 12,700 | |
| October 1 | at Nebraska–Omaha | No. 3 | Al F. Caniglia Field; Omaha, NE | L 10–18 | 8,400 | |
| October 8 | South Dakota^{†} | No. 10 | Dacotah Field; Fargo, ND | W 17–3 | 13,200 | |
| October 15 | at South Dakota State | No. 9 | Coughlin–Alumni Stadium; Brookings, SD (rivalry) | W 24–12 | 9,308 | |
| October 22 | Northern Colorado | No. 10 | Dacotah Field; Fargo, ND | W 34–21 | 10,600 | |
| October 29 | at North Dakota | No. 9 | Memorial Stadium; Grand Forks, ND (Nickel Trophy) | W 23–6 | 14,800 | |
| November 5 | at Morningside | No. 5 | Elwood Olsen Stadium; Sioux City, IA | W 49–7 | 1,356 | |
| November 12 | St. Cloud State | No. 5 | Dacotah Field; Fargo, ND | W 31–20 | 3,300 | |
| November 26 | No. 4 Towson State* | No. 5 | Dacotah Field; Fargo, ND (NCAA Division II Quarterfinal) | W 24–17 | 5,600 | |
| December 3 | at No. 1 UC Davis* | No. 5 | Toomey Field; Davis, CA (NCAA Division II Semifinal) | W 26–17 | 9,100 | |
| December 10 | vs. No. 7 Central State (OH)* | No. 6 | McAllen Veterans Memorial Stadium; McAllen, TX (NCAA Division II Championship Game—Palm Bowl) | W 41–21 | 5,275 | |
*Non-conference game; ^{†}Homecoming; Rankings from NCAA Division II Football Committee Poll released prior to the game
