= 1983 Sonoma State Cossacks football team =

American college football season

1983 Sonoma State Cossacks football
- Conference: Northern California Athletic Conference
- Record: 2–9 (0–6 NCAC)
- Head coach: Tony Kehl (2nd season)
- Home stadium: Cossacks Stadium

1983 Northern California Athletic Conference football standings
	Conf.					Overall
Team	W		L		T	W		L		T
No. 1 UC Davis $^	6	–	0	–	0	11	–	1	–	0
Sacramento State	4	–	1	–	1	5	–	5	–	1
Chico State	3	–	2	–	1	4	–	5	–	1
Cal State Hayward	3	–	3	–	0	6	–	4	–	0
Humboldt State	3	–	3	–	0	4	–	6	–	0
San Francisco State	1	–	5	–	0	2	–	8	–	0
Sonoma State	0	–	6	–	0	2	–	9	–	0
$ – Conference champion; ^ – NCAA Division II playoff participant; Rankings from NCAA Division II Football Committee poll

The 1983 Sonoma State Cossacks football team represented Sonoma State University as a member of the Northern California Athletic Conference (NCAC) during the 1983 NCAA Division II football season. Led by second-year head coach Tony Kehl, Sonoma State compiled an overall record of 2–9 with a mark of 0–6 in conference play, placing last out of seven teams in the NCAC. The team was outscored by its opponents 304 to 138 for the season. The Cossacks played home games at Cossacks Stadium (Note: Cossacks Stadium was renamed in 2002 to Seawolf Stadium when the University changed the name of the mascot to Seawolves.) in Rohnert Park, California.

== Schedule ==
Date	Opponent	Site	Result	Attendance	Source
September 3	Sacramento State	Cossacks Stadium; Rohnert Park, CA	L 7–35	1,900–2,800	
September 10	at Cal State Hayward	Pioneer Stadium; Hayward, CA	L 7–28	383–720	
September 17	at San Francisco State	Cox Stadium; San Francisco, CA	L 6–31	350–400	
September 24	at Occidental*	D. W. Patterson Field; Los Angeles, CA	L 16–21	1,140	
October 1	Humboldt State^{†}	Cossacks Stadium; Rohnert Park, CA	L 6–13	1,500–2,000	
October 15	Chico State	Cossacks Stadium; Rohnert Park, CA	L 29–50	624–960	
October 22	Saint Mary's*	Cossacks Stadium; Rohnert Park, CA	L 0–31	825	
October 29	Azusa Pacific*	Cossacks Stadium; Rohnert Park, CA	W 38–19	650–1,040	
November 5	Carroll (MT)*	Cossacks Stadium; Rohnert Park, CA	W 29–24	630	
November 12	at Santa Clara*	Buck Shaw Stadium; Santa Clara, CA	L 0–10	840–1,500	
November 19	at No. 1 UC Davis	Toomey Field; Davis, CA	L 0–42	1,246–3,800	
*Non-conference game; ^{†}Homecoming; Rankings from NCAA Division II Football Committee Poll released prior to the game
