= 1983 UC Davis Aggies football team =

American college football season

1983 UC Davis Aggies football

NCAC champion

NCAA Division II Semifinal, L 17–26 vs. North Dakota State
- Conference: Northern California Athletic Conference
- Record: 11–1 (6–0 NCAC)
- Head coach: Jim Sochor (14th season)
- Home stadium: Toomey Field

1983 Northern California Athletic Conference football standings
	Conf.					Overall
Team	W		L		T	W		L		T
No. 1 UC Davis $^	6	–	0	–	0	11	–	1	–	0
Sacramento State	4	–	1	–	1	5	–	5	–	1
Chico State	3	–	2	–	1	4	–	5	–	1
Cal State Hayward	3	–	3	–	0	6	–	4	–	0
Humboldt State	3	–	3	–	0	4	–	6	–	0
San Francisco State	1	–	5	–	0	2	–	8	–	0
Sonoma State	0	–	6	–	0	2	–	9	–	0
$ – Conference champion; ^ – NCAA Division II playoff participant; Rankings from NCAA Division II Football Committee poll

The 1983 UC Davis football team represented the University of California, Davis as a member of the Northern California Athletic Conference (NCAC) during the 1983 NCAA Division II football season. Led by 14th-year head coach Jim Sochor, UC Davis compiled an overall record of 11–1 with a mark of 6–0 in conference play, winning the NCAC title for the 13th consecutive season. 1983 was the team's 14th consecutive winning season. With the 6–0 conference record, the team stretched their conference winning streak to 15 games dating back to the 1981 season. The Aggies were ranked No. 1 in the NCAA Division II polls for the last three weeks of the regular season. They advanced to the NCAA Division II Football Championship playoffs for the second straight year, where they beat Butler in the quarterfinals before losing to eventual national champion North Dakota State in the semifinals. The team outscored its opponents 380 to 94 for the season. The Aggies played home games at Toomey Field in Davis, California.

== Schedule ==
Date	Time	Opponent	Rank	Site	TV	Result	Attendance	Source
September 17		Cal Lutheran*		Toomey Field; Davis, CA		W 24–6	7,400	
September 24		Humboldt State	No. 10	Toomey Field; Davis, CA		W 34–0	7,100–7,200	
October 1		at Cal State Northridge*	No. 9	North Campus Stadium; Northridge, CA		W 31–3	3,144	
October 8		at No. T–10 Cal Poly*	No. 4	Mustang Stadium; San Luis Obispo, CA (rivalry)		W 24–14	4,933	
October 15		at Santa Clara*	No. 4	Buck Shaw Stadium; Santa Clara, CA		W 24–6	8,478	
October 22		at Chico State	No. 3	University Stadium; Chico, CA		W 24–7	7,342	
October 29		San Francisco State	No. 2	Toomey Field; Davis, CA		W 41–9	7,500–7,800	
November 5		Cal State Hayward	No. T–1	Toomey Field; Davis, CA		W 42–3	6,800–10,000	
November 12		at Sacramento State	No. T–1	Charles C. Hughes Stadium; Sacramento, CA (Causeway Classic)		W 52–14	7,650	
November 19		Sonoma State	No. 1	Toomey Field; Davis, CA		W 42–0	1,246–3,800	
November 26	1:00 p.m.	No. 8 Butler*	No. 1	Toomey Field; Davis, CA (NCAA Division II Quarterfinal)	KCRA-TV	W 25–6	8,900	
December 3		No. 1 North Dakota State*	No. 5	Toomey Field; Davis, CA (NCAA Division II Semifinal)		L 17–26	9,100	
*Non-conference game; Rankings from NCAA Division II Football Committee Poll released prior to the game; All times are in Pacific time

== NFL draft ==
The following UC Davis Aggies players were selected in the 1984 NFL draft.

Player	Position	Round	Overall	NFL team
Bo Eason	Defensive back	2	54	Houston Oilers
