= 1930 Pacific Tigers football team =

American college football season

1930 Pacific Tigers football
- Conference: Far Western Conference
- Record: 3–6 (2–2 FWC)
- Head coach: Erwin Righter (10th season)
- Home stadium: Baxter Stadium

1930 Far Western Conference football standings
	Conf.					Overall
Team	W		L		T	W		L		T
Fresno State $	5	–	0	–	0	8	–	0	–	0
Nevada	2	–	1	–	0	2	–	4	–	2
Pacific (CA)	2	–	2	–	0	3	–	6	–	0
San Jose State	1	–	2	–	1	2	–	3	–	3
Chico State	0	–	2	–	0	3	–	4	–	0
Cal Aggies	0	–	3	–	1	0	–	7	–	1
$ – Conference champion

The 1930 Pacific Tigers football team represented the College of the Pacific—now known as the University of the Pacific—in Stockton, California as a member of the Far Western Conference (FWC) during the 1930 college football season. The team was led by tenth-year head coach Erwin Righter, and played home games at Baxter Stadium in Stockton. Pacific compiled an overall record of 3–6 with a mark of 2–2 in conference play, placing third in the FWC. The Tigers were outscored by their opponents 104 to 101 for the season.

== Schedule ==
Date	Opponent	Site	Result	Source
September 26	Modesto*	Baxter Stadium; Stockton, CA	W 25–0	
October 3	at Loyola (CA)*	Wrigley Field; Los Angeles, CA	L 0–7	
October 10	Whitman*	Baxter Stadium; Stockton, CA	L 13–14	
October 18	at Nevada	Mackay Stadium (Note: This stadium is the predecessor to the current Mackay Stadium, which was opened for the 1966 season.); Reno, NV	L 13–20	
October 25	San Jose State	Baxter Stadium; Stockton, CA (rivalrya)	W 27–0	
November 1	Fresno State^{†}	Baxter Stadium; Stockton, CA	L 0–19	
November 8	at San Diego Marines (Note: The Marine Corps Recruit Depot (MCRD) in San Diego fielded a team that played against colleges and other military teams from 1922 to 1964.)*	Balboa Stadium?; San Diego, CA	L 13–18	
November 21	at Cal Aggies	Sacramento Stadium; Sacramento, CA	W 10–6	
December 13	at Sacramento*	Sacramento, CA	L 0–20	
*Non-conference game; ^{†}Homecoming
