= 1963 Sacramento State Hornets football team =

American college football season

1963 Sacramento State Hornets football
- Conference: Far Western Conference
- Record: 6–2–1 (2–2–1 FWC)
- Head coach: Ray Clemons (3rd season)
- Home stadium: Charles C. Hughes Stadium

1963 Far Western Conference football standings
| | Conf. | | | | | Overall |
| Team | W | | L | | T | W | | L | | T |
|---|---|---|---|---|---|---|---|---|---|---|
| Humboldt State + | 3 | – | 1 | – | 1 | 6 | – | 1 | – | 2 |
| San Francisco State + | 3 | – | 1 | – | 1 | 6 | – | 2 | – | 1 |
| UC Davis + | 3 | – | 1 | – | 1 | 6 | – | 2 | – | 1 |
| Sacramento State | 2 | – | 2 | – | 1 | 6 | – | 2 | – | 1 |
| Nevada | 2 | – | 3 | – | 0 | 3 | – | 6 | – | 0 |
| Chico State | 0 | – | 5 | – | 0 | 2 | – | 7 | – | 0 |
+ – Conference co-champions

The 1963 Sacramento State Hornets football team represented Sacramento State College—now known as California State University, Sacramento—as a member of the Far Western Conference (FWC) during the 1963 NCAA College Division football season. Led by third-year head coach Ray Clemons, Sacramento State compiled an overall record of 6–2–1 with a mark of 2–2–1 in conference play, placing fourth in the FWC. For the season the team outscored its opponents 120 to 83. The Hornets played home games at Charles C. Hughes Stadium in Sacramento, California.

== Schedule ==
| Date | Opponent | Site | Result | Attendance | Source |
|---|---|---|---|---|---|
| September 21 | at Cal Poly Pomona* | Kellogg Field; Pomona, CA | W 36–34 | 2,500 | |
| September 28 | Santa Clara* | Charles C. Hughes Stadium; Sacramento, CA | W 20–14 | | |
| October 5 | at Long Beach State* | Veterans Stadium; Long Beach, CA | W 4–0 | 3,123 | |
| October 12 | UC Santa Barbara* | Charles C. Hughes Stadium; Sacramento, CA | W 19–0 | 2,500 | |
| October 19 | San Francisco State | Charles C. Hughes Stadium; Sacramento, CA | W 13–0 | | |
| October 26 | at Chico State | College Field; Chico, CA | W 9–3 | 7,000 | |
| November 2 | Nevada | Charles C. Hughes Stadium; Sacramento, CA | L 11–15 | | |
| November 9 | at Humboldt State | Redwood Bowl; Arcata, CA | T 0–0 | | |
| November 16 | at UC Davis | Toomey Field; Davis, CA (rivalry) | L 8–17 | 8,000 | |
*Non-conference game
