= 1983 NCAA Division II football season =

American college football season

- Regular season: August – November 1983
- Playoffs: December 1983
- National Championship: Palm Bowl; Veterans Stadium; McAllen, TX
- Champion: North Dakota State

The 1983 NCAA Division II football season, part of college football in the United States organized by the National Collegiate Athletic Association at the Division II level, began in August 1983, and concluded with the NCAA Division II Football Championship on December 10, 1983, at McAllen Veterans Memorial Stadium in McAllen, Texas. During the game's five-year stretch in McAllen, the "City of Palms", it was referred to as the Palm Bowl. The North Dakota State Bison defeated the Central State (Ohio), 41–21, to win their first Division II national title.

== Conference changes and new programs ==
School	1982 Conference	1983 Conference
Arkansas-Pine Bluff	Independent (D-II)	Independent (NAIA D-I)
Cal Poly Pomona	Western	Dropped Program
Georgetown (KY)	Heartland	Independent (NAIA D-I)
Fisk	SIAC	CAC (D-III)
Puget Sound	Independent	Evergreen (NAIA D-I)
Sonoma State	Independent (D-II)	NCAC
West Georgia	D-III Independent	Gulf South

== Conference standings ==
1983 Central Intercollegiate Athletic Association football standings
	Conf.					Overall
Team	W		L		T	W		L		T
Northern
No. 6 Virginia Union xy$^	6	–	1	–	0	10	–	2	–	0
Saint Paul's (VA)	4	–	3	–	0	7	–	3	–	0
Hampton	4	–	3	–	0	5	–	5	–	0
Norfolk State	3	–	4	–	0	5	–	5	–	0
Elizabeth City State	2	–	5	–	0	4	–	6	–	0
Virginia State	2	–	5	–	0	4	–	6	–	0
Southern
Winston-Salem State xy	6	–	0	–	1	8	–	2	–	1
North Carolina Central	6	–	1	–	0	8	–	1	–	1
Livingstone	3	–	4	–	0	5	–	4	–	0
Johnson C. Smith	2	–	5	–	0	2	–	8	–	0
Fayetteville State	1	–	5	–	1	1	–	8	–	1
Bowie State	1	–	6	–	0	1	–	9	–	0
Championship: Virginia Union 34, Winston-Salem State 7
$ – Conference champion; x – Division champion/co-champions; y – Championship game participant; ^ – NCAA Division II playoff participant; Rankings from NCAA Division II Football Committee poll

1983 Great Lakes Intercollegiate Athletic Conference football standings
	Conf.					Overall
Team	W		L		T	W		L		T
No. 7 Saginaw Valley State $^	6	–	0	–	0	9	–	3	–	0
No. 8 Hillsdale	4	–	2	–	0	8	–	2	–	0
Wayne State (MI)	4	–	2	–	0	7	–	3	–	0
Northwood	3	–	3	–	0	4	–	4	–	0
Grand Valley State	3	–	3	–	0	4	–	6	–	0
Michigan Tech	1	–	5	–	0	3	–	7	–	0
Ferris State	0	–	6	–	0	0	–	9	–	0
$ – Conference champion; ^ – NAIA Division I playoff participant; Rankings from NAIA Division I poll

1983 Gulf South Conference football standings
	Conf.					Overall
Team	W		L		T	W		L		T
No. 3 North Alabama $^	8	–	0	–	0	11	–	1	–	1
Mississippi College	4	–	3	–	0	8	–	3	–	0
Troy State	4	–	3	–	0	6	–	5	–	0
Livingston	4	–	4	–	0	6	–	4	–	0
Jacksonville State	4	–	4	–	0	6	–	5	–	0
Tennessee–Martin	3	–	4	–	0	4	–	7	–	0
Delta State	3	–	5	–	0	5	–	5	–	0
Valdosta State	2	–	5	–	0	5	–	6	–	0
West Georgia	1	–	5	–	0	4	–	6	–	0
$ – Conference champion; ^ – NCAA Division II playoff participant; Rankings from NCAA Division II Football Committee poll

1983 Heartland Collegiate Conference standings
	Conf.					Overall
Team	W		L		T	W		L		T
Butler $^	5	–	0	–	1	9	–	1	–	1
Indiana Central	4	–	1	–	1	6	–	3	–	1
Evansville	2	–	1	–	3	3	–	4	–	3
Ashland	2	–	4	–	0	5	–	5	–	0
Franklin (IN)	2	–	4	–	0	4	–	6	–	0
Valparaiso	2	–	4	–	0	4	–	6	–	0
Saint Joseph's (IN)	1	–	4	–	1	2	–	7	–	1
$ – Conference champion; ^ – NCAA Division II playoff participant

1983 Lone Star Conference football standings
	Conf.					Overall
Team	W		L		T	W		L		T
No. 2 Southwest Texas State +^	6	–	1	–	0	9	–	2	–	0
East Texas State +	6	–	1	–	0	8	–	2	–	0
Stephen F. Austin	5	–	2	–	0	7	–	4	–	0
Abilene Christian	4	–	3	–	0	7	–	3	–	0
Angelo State	3	–	4	–	0	5	–	6	–	0
Texas A&I	2	–	5	–	0	2	–	9	–	0
Sam Houston State	1	–	6	–	0	4	–	7	–	0
Howard Payne	1	–	6	–	0	2	–	8	–	0
+ – Conference co-champions; ^ – NCAA Division II playoff participant; Rankings from NCAA Division II Football Committee poll

1983 Missouri Intercollegiate Athletic Association football standings
	Conf.					Overall
Team	W		L		T	W		L		T
Missouri–Rolla +	4	–	1	–	0	8	–	2	–	0
Central Missouri State +	4	–	1	–	0	6	–	5	–	0
NE Missouri State	3	–	2	–	0	4	–	7	–	0
NW Missouri State	2	–	3	–	0	5	–	6	–	0
Lincoln (MO)	1	–	4	–	0	2	–	8	–	0
SE Missouri State	1	–	4	–	0	1	–	9	–	0
+ – Conference co-champions

1983 North Central Conference football standings
	Conf.					Overall
Team	W		L		T	W		L		T
No. 5 North Dakota State +^	8	–	1	–	0	12	–	1	–	0
No. 10 Nebraska–Omaha +	8	–	1	–	0	9	–	2	–	0
South Dakota	6	–	3	–	0	7	–	4	–	0
Augustana (SD)	4	–	5	–	0	5	–	6	–	0
Northern Colorado	4	–	5	–	0	4	–	6	–	0
North Dakota	4	–	5	–	0	6	–	5	–	0
St. Cloud State	4	–	5	–	0	5	–	6	–	0
Mankato State	3	–	6	–	0	4	–	7	–	0
South Dakota State	3	–	6	–	0	5	–	6	–	0
Morningside	1	–	8	–	0	1	–	10	–	0
+ – Conference co-champions; ^ – NCAA Division II playoff participant; Rankings from NCAA Division II Football Committee poll

1983 Northern California Athletic Conference football standings
	Conf.					Overall
Team	W		L		T	W		L		T
No. 1 UC Davis $^	6	–	0	–	0	11	–	1	–	0
Sacramento State	4	–	1	–	1	5	–	5	–	1
Chico State	3	–	2	–	1	4	–	5	–	1
Cal State Hayward	3	–	3	–	0	6	–	4	–	0
Humboldt State	3	–	3	–	0	4	–	6	–	0
San Francisco State	1	–	5	–	0	2	–	8	–	0
Sonoma State	0	–	6	–	0	2	–	9	–	0
$ – Conference champion; ^ – NCAA Division II playoff participant; Rankings from NCAA Division II Football Committee poll

1983 Northern Intercollegiate Conference football standings
	Conf.					Overall
Team	W		L		T	W		L		T
No. 20 Winona State $	5	–	1	–	0	7	–	4	–	0
Moorhead State	4	–	2	–	0	6	–	3	–	0
Minnesota Duluth	4	–	2	–	0	6	–	4	–	0
Minnesota Morris	2	–	3	–	1	4	–	4	–	2
Northern State	1	–	3	–	2	4	–	4	–	2
Southwest State (MN)	1	–	3	–	2	3	–	6	–	2
Bemidji State	1	–	4	–	1	4	–	6	–	1
$ – Conference champion; Rankings from NAIA Division I poll

1983 Pennsylvania State Athletic Conference football standings
	Conf.					Overall
Team	W		L		T	W		L		T
East Division
East Stroudsburg xy	5	–	1	–	0	7	–	4	–	0
Kutztown	4	–	2	–	0	6	–	4	–	0
Bloomsburg	4	–	2	–	0	5	–	5	–	0
Millersville	3	–	3	–	0	4	–	6	–	0
West Chester	2	–	3	–	0	7	–	3	–	0
Mansfield	1	–	4	–	0	4	–	6	–	0
Cheyney	1	–	5	–	0	3	–	7	–	0
West Division
Clarion xy$	5	–	1	–	0	9	–	2	–	0
Edinboro	4	–	2	–	0	8	–	2	–	0
California (PA)	4	–	2	–	0	7	–	3	–	0
IUP	4	–	2	–	0	5	–	5	–	0
Slippery Rock	3	–	3	–	0	6	–	4	–	0
Shippensburg	1	–	5	–	0	4	–	6	–	0
Lock Haven	0	–	6	–	0	3	–	7	–	0
Championship: Clarion 27, East Stroudsburg 14
$ – Conference champion; x – Division champion/co-champions; y – Championship game participant

1983 Southern Intercollegiate Athletic Conference football standings
	Conf.					Overall
Team	W		L		T	W		L		T
Division II
No. 9 Fort Valley State x	8	–	0	–	0	9	–	1	–	0
Alabama A&M	6	–	1	–	0	7	–	3	–	1
Tuskegee	5	–	3	–	0	5	–	6	–	0
Morris Brown	4	–	3	–	0	5	–	4	–	1
Morehouse	4	–	4	–	0	6	–	4	–	0
Albany State	3	–	5	–	0	4	–	6	–	0
Savannah State	1	–	6	–	0	2	–	9	–	0
Clark	0	–	7	–	0	2	–	7	–	0
Division III
Knoxville x	3	–	0	–	0	5	–	2	–	1
Lane	1	–	1	–	0	6	–	4	–	0
Miles	0	–	5	–	0	2	–	8	–	0
x – Division champion/co-champions; Rankings from 1983 NCAA Division II football rankings

1983 Western Football Conference standings
	Conf.					Overall
Team	W		L		T	W		L		T
Cal State Northridge +	2	–	1	–	0	6	–	4	–	0
Santa Clara +	2	–	1	–	0	6	–	4	–	0
Cal Poly	1	–	2	–	0	5	–	6	–	0
Portland State	1	–	2	–	0	3	–	7	–	0
+ – Conference co-champions

1983 NCAA Division II independents football records
	Conf.			Overall
Team	W	L	T	W		L		T
No. 7 Central State (OH) ^		–		12	–	1	–	0
No. 4 Towson State ^		–		10	–	2	–	0
Northern Michigan		–		8	–	2	–	0
Saint Mary's		–		8	–	2	–	0
Southern Connecticut State		–		8	–	2	–	0
Eastern Washington		–		5	–	5	–	0
UCF		–		5	–	6	–	0
Central Connecticut		–		4	–	6	–	0
American International		–		4	–	7	–	0
Kentucky State		–		2	–	7	–	2
Morgan State		–		2	–	8	–	0
Liberty		–		2	–	9	–	0
New Haven		–		1	–	9	–	0
^ – NCAA Division II playoff participant; Rankings from NCAA Division II Football Committee poll

== Conference summaries ==
Conference Champions

Central Intercollegiate Athletic Association – Virginia Union
Great Lakes Intercollegiate Athletic Conference – Saginaw Valley State
Gulf South Conference – North Alabama
Heartland Collegiate Conference – Butler
Lone Star Conference – East Texas State and Southwest Texas State
Missouri Intercollegiate Athletic Association – Central Missouri State and Missouri–Rolla
North Central Conference – Nebraska–Omaha and North Dakota State
Northern California Athletic Conference – UC Davis
Northern Intercollegiate Conference – Winona State
Pennsylvania State Athletic Conference – Clarion
Rocky Mountain Athletic Conference – Colorado Mesa
South Atlantic Conference – Carson-Newman
Southern Intercollegiate Athletic Conference – Fort Valley State

== Postseason ==
1983 NCAA Division II Football Championship
- Teams: 8
- Finals Site: Veterans Stadium; McAllen, TX
- Champion: North Dakota State; (1st title, 2nd title game)
- Runner-up: Central State (OH); (1st title game)
- Semifinalists: UC Davis; North Alabama
- Winning coach: Don Morton; 1st championship

The 1983 NCAA Division II Football Championship playoffs were the 11th single-elimination tournament to determine the national champion of men's NCAA Division II college football. The championship game was held at McAllen Veterans Memorial Stadium in McAllen, Texas, for the third consecutive time.

=== Playoff bracket ===
First round Campus sites
UC Davis	25
Butler	6
North Dakota State	24
Towson State	17
North Alabama	16
Virginia Union	14
Central State (OH)	24
Southwest Texas State	16

Semifinals; Campus sites
UC Davis	17
North Dakota State	26
North Alabama	24
Central State (OH)	27

Championship; McAllen Veterans Memorial Stadium; McAllen, TX
North Dakota State	41
Central State (OH)	21

== See also ==
- 1983 NCAA Division I-A football season
- 1983 NCAA Division I-AA football season
- 1983 NCAA Division III football season
- 1983 NAIA Division I football season
- 1983 NAIA Division II football season
