= 1963 San Francisco State Gators football team =

American college football season

1963 San Francisco State Gators football

FWC co-champion
- Conference: Far Western Conference
- Record: 6–2–1 (3–1–1 FWC)
- Head coach: Vic Rowen (3rd season)
- Home stadium: Cox Stadium

1963 Far Western Conference football standings
	Conf.					Overall
Team	W		L		T	W		L		T
Humboldt State +	3	–	1	–	1	6	–	1	–	2
San Francisco State +	3	–	1	–	1	6	–	2	–	1
UC Davis +	3	–	1	–	1	6	–	2	–	1
Sacramento State	2	–	2	–	1	6	–	2	–	1
Nevada	2	–	3	–	0	3	–	6	–	0
Chico State	0	–	5	–	0	2	–	7	–	0
+ – Conference co-champions

The 1963 San Francisco State Gators football team represented San Francisco State College—now known as San Francisco State University—as a member of the Far Western Conference (FWC) during the 1963 NCAA College Division football season. Led by third-year head coach Vic Rowen, San Francisco State compiled an overall record of 6–2–1 with a mark of 3–1–1 in conference play, sharing the FWC title with Humboldt State and UC Davis. The Gators won or shared the title for the conference for third consecutive season. The team outscored its opponents 157 to 128 on the season. The Gators played home games at Cox Stadium in San Francisco.

== Schedule ==
Date	Opponent	Site	Result	Attendance	Source
September 21	Cal Poly*	Cox Stadium; San Francisco, CA	W 33–22	4,500	
September 28	Long Beach State*	Cox Stadium; San Francisco, CA	W 20–16	2,500	
October 5	at Cal Poly Pomona*	Kellogg Field; Pomona, CA	W 21–6	2,500	
October 12	at Santa Clara*	Buck Shaw Stadium; Santa Clara, CA	L 6–21		
October 19	at Sacramento State	Charles C. Hughes Stadium; Sacramento, CA	L 0–13		
October 26	at UC Davis	Toomey Field; Davis, CA	T 10–10	4,500	
November 2	Humboldt State	Cox Stadium; San Francisco, CA	W 21–16	3,500	
November 9	at Chico State	College Field; Chico, CA	W 25–18	3,500	
November 16	at Nevada	Mackay Stadium (Note: This stadium is the predecessor to the current Mackay Stadium, which was opened for the 1966 season.); Reno, NV	W 21–6		
*Non-conference game
