= 1930 Fresno State Bulldogs football team =

American college football season

1930 Fresno State Bulldogs football

FWC champion
- Conference: Far Western Conference
- Record: 8–0 (5–0 FWC)
- Head coach: Stanley Borleske (2nd season)
- Home stadium: Fresno State College Stadium

1930 Far Western Conference football standings
	Conf.					Overall
Team	W		L		T	W		L		T
Fresno State $	5	–	0	–	0	8	–	0	–	0
Nevada	2	–	1	–	0	2	–	4	–	2
Pacific (CA)	2	–	2	–	0	3	–	6	–	0
San Jose State	1	–	2	–	1	2	–	3	–	3
Chico State	0	–	2	–	0	3	–	4	–	0
Cal Aggies	0	–	3	–	1	0	–	7	–	1
$ – Conference champion

The 1930 Fresno State Bulldogs football team represented Fresno State Normal School—now known as California State University, Fresno—during the 1930 college football season.

Fresno State competed in the Far Western Conference (FWC). (Note: The Northern California Athletic Conference (NCAC) was known as the Far Western Conference (FWC) from its founding in 1925 to 1982.) The 1930 team was led by second-year head coach Stanley Borleske and played home games at Fresno State College Stadium (Note: Ratcliffe Stadium was known as Fresno State College Stadium from 1926 to 1940.) on the campus of Fresno City College in Fresno, California. They finished undefeated, as champion of the FWS, with a record of eight wins and no losses (8–0, 5–0 FWC). The Bulldogs outscored their opponents 154–66 for the season and held the other team to a touchdown or less in six of the eight games.

== Schedule ==
Date	Opponent	Site	Result	Attendance	Source
September 27	at California Christian*	Los Angeles, CA	W 19–7	3,500	
October 3	Redlands*	Fresno State College Stadium; Fresno, CA	W 31–26	4,500	
October 10	at Loyola (CA)*	Wrigley Field; Los Angeles, CA	W 12–7		
October 18	Chico State	Fresno State College Stadium; Fresno, CA	W 13–7		
November 1	at Pacific (CA)	Baxter Stadium; Stockton, CA	W 19–0		
November 8	Cal Aggies	Fresno State College Stadium; Fresno, CA	W 27–7	6,000	
November 15	at San Jose State	Spartan Field; San Jose, CA (rivalry)	W 27–12		
November 27	Nevada	Fresno State College Stadium; Fresno, CA	W 6–0	10,000–11,000	
*Non-conference game
