= 1983 Cal State Hayward Pioneers football team =

American college football season

1983 Cal State Hayward Pioneers football
- Conference: Northern California Athletic Conference
- Record: 6–4 (3–3 NCAC)
- Head coach: Tim Tierney (9th season)
- Home stadium: Pioneer Stadium

1983 Northern California Athletic Conference football standings
	Conf.					Overall
Team	W		L		T	W		L		T
No. 1 UC Davis $^	6	–	0	–	0	11	–	1	–	0
Sacramento State	4	–	1	–	1	5	–	5	–	1
Chico State	3	–	2	–	1	4	–	5	–	1
Cal State Hayward	3	–	3	–	0	6	–	4	–	0
Humboldt State	3	–	3	–	0	4	–	6	–	0
San Francisco State	1	–	5	–	0	2	–	8	–	0
Sonoma State	0	–	6	–	0	2	–	9	–	0
$ – Conference champion; ^ – NCAA Division II playoff participant; Rankings from NCAA Division II Football Committee poll

The 1983 Cal State Hayward Pioneers football team represented California State University, Hayward—now known as California State University, East Bay—as a member of the Northern California Athletic Conference (NCAC) during the 1983 NCAA Division II football season. Led by ninth-year head coach Tim Tierney, Cal State Hayward compiled an overall record of 6–4 with a mark of 3–3 in conference play, placing fourth in the NCAC. The team was outscored by its opponents 163 to 159 for the season. The Pioneers played home games at Pioneer Stadium in Hayward, California.

== Schedule ==
Date	Opponent	Site	Result	Attendance	Source
September 10	Sonoma State	Pioneer Stadium; Hayward, CA	W 28–7	383–720	
September 17	Cal State Northridge*	Pioneer Stadium; Hayward, CA	W 28–16	200–586	
September 24	Santa Clara*	Pioneer Stadium; Hayward, CA	W 17–15	1,200–2,000	
October 1	at Saint Mary's*	Saint Mary's Stadium; Moraga, CA	L 7–12	1,800	
October 8	at San Francisco State	Cox Stadium; San Francisco, CA	W 13–7	500–584	
October 22	at San Diego*	Torero Stadium; San Diego, CA	W 40–21	235	
October 29	Humboldt State	Pioneer Stadium; Hayward, CA	W 10–3	450–1,100	
November 5	at No. T–1 UC Davis	Toomey Field; Davis, CA	L 3–42	6,800–10,000	
November 12	Chico State	Pioneer Stadium; Hayward, CA	L 7–20	400–605	
November 19	at Sacramento State	Hornet Stadium; Sacramento, CA	L 6–20	550–1,600	
*Non-conference game; Rankings from NCAA Division II Football Committee Poll released prior to the game
