= 1930 Nevada Wolf Pack football team =

American college football season

1930 Nevada Wolf Pack football
- Conference: Far Western Conference
- Record: 2–4–2 (2–1 FWC)
- Head coach: George Philbrook (2nd season)
- Home stadium: Mackay Field

1930 Far Western Conference football standings
	Conf.					Overall
Team	W		L		T	W		L		T
Fresno State $	5	–	0	–	0	8	–	0	–	0
Nevada	2	–	1	–	0	2	–	4	–	2
Pacific (CA)	2	–	2	–	0	3	–	6	–	0
San Jose State	1	–	2	–	1	2	–	3	–	3
Chico State	0	–	2	–	0	3	–	4	–	0
Cal Aggies	0	–	3	–	1	0	–	7	–	1
$ – Conference champion

The 1930 Nevada Wolf Pack football team was an American football team that represented the University of Nevada in the Far Western Conference (FWC) during the 1930 college football season. In their second season under head coach George Philbrook, the team compiled a 2–4–2 record (2–1 against conference opponents), outscored opponents by a total of 77 to 73, and finished in second place in the conference.

== Schedule ==
Date	Opponent	Site	Result	Attendance	Source
September 27	Utah*	Mackay Field; Reno, NV	L 7–20	4,800	
October 4	at BYU*	Provo, UT	T 6–6		
October 11	Santa Clara*	Mackay Field; Reno, NV	T 0–0	5,000	
October 18	Pacific (CA)	Mackay Field; Reno, NV	W 20–13		
October 25	Cal Aggies	Mackay Field; Reno, NV	W 31–0		
November 1	San Francisco*	Mackay Field; Reno, NV	L 13–20		
November 15	at California*	California Memorial Stadium; Berkeley, CA	L 0–8	2,000	
November 27	at Fresno State	Fresno State College Stadium; Fresno, CA	L 0–6	10,000–11,000	
*Non-conference game

== Players ==
The following individuals played for the 1930 Nevada team:

- Bill Backer – halfback
- Dick Barthels
- Drury – fullback
- Chester Elliott – halfback
- John Griffin – tackle
- Lloyd Guffrey
- Jack Hill – halfback
- Kell – guard/tackle
- Lefebvre – halfback
- Art Levy – end/quarterback
- Walt Linehan
- Bob Madriaga – guard
- McGarraghan – guard
- Matt Mohorovich – center
- Hank Rampoldi – tackle/end
- Risley – quarterback/halfback
- Wally Rusk – guard
- Neil Scott – end
- Clem Sultenfuss – halfback
- Olie Thies – tackle
- Jack Walther – center
- Willard Weaver – end
- Harold Willard
- Milton Young – quarterback
