= 1963 Humboldt State Lumberjacks football team =

American college football season

1963 Humboldt State Lumberjacks football

FWC co-champion
- Conference: Far Western Conference
- Record: 6–1–2 (3–1–1 FWC)
- Head coach: Phil Sarboe (13th season)
- Home stadium: Redwood Bowl

1963 Far Western Conference football standings
	Conf.					Overall
Team	W		L		T	W		L		T
Humboldt State +	3	–	1	–	1	6	–	1	–	2
San Francisco State +	3	–	1	–	1	6	–	2	–	1
UC Davis +	3	–	1	–	1	6	–	2	–	1
Sacramento State	2	–	2	–	1	6	–	2	–	1
Nevada	2	–	3	–	0	3	–	6	–	0
Chico State	0	–	5	–	0	2	–	7	–	0
+ – Conference co-champions

The 1963 Humboldt State Lumberjacks football team represented Humboldt State College—now known as California State Polytechnic University, Humboldt—as a member of the Far Western Conference (FWC) during the 1963 NCAA College Division football season. Led by 13th-year head coach Phil Sarboe, the Lumberjacks compiled an overall record of 6–1–2 with a mark of 3–1–1 in conference play, sharing the FWC title with San Francisco State and UC Davis. The team outscored opponents 138 to 54 for the season and shut out five opponents. Humboldt State played home games at the Redwood Bowl in Arcata, California.

== Schedule ==
Date	Opponent	Site	Result	Attendance	Source
September 21	at Whitworth*	Whitworth Pine Bowl; Spokane, WA	T 7–7	3,300	
September 28	Hawaii*	Redwood Bowl; Arcata, CA	W 30–13	6,000	
October 12	Redlands*	Redwood Bowl; Arcata, CA	W 7–0	4,500–5,000	
October 19	UC Davis	Redwood Bowl; Arcata, CA	W 10–0	5,500	
October 26	Nevada	Redwood Bowl; Arcata, CA	W 3–0	5,000	
November 2	at San Francisco State	Cox Stadium; San Francisco, CA	L 16–21	3,500	
November 9	Sacramento State^{†}	Redwood Bowl; Arcata, CA	T 0–0	5,500	
November 16	at Chico State	College Field; Chico, CA	W 32–13	2,700–3,500	
November 28	Cal Poly*	Redwood Bowl; Arcata, CA	W 33–0	4,500–4,800	
*Non-conference game; ^{†}Homecoming
