= 1963 UC Davis Aggies football team =

American college football season

1963 UC Davis Aggies football

FWC co-champion
- Conference: Far Western Conference
- Record: 6–2–1 (3–1–1 FWC)
- Head coach: Will Lotter (8th season)
- Captain: Dick Carriere
- Home stadium: Toomey Field

1963 Far Western Conference football standings
	Conf.					Overall
Team	W		L		T	W		L		T
Humboldt State +	3	–	1	–	1	6	–	1	–	2
San Francisco State +	3	–	1	–	1	6	–	2	–	1
UC Davis +	3	–	1	–	1	6	–	2	–	1
Sacramento State	2	–	2	–	1	6	–	2	–	1
Nevada	2	–	3	–	0	3	–	6	–	0
Chico State	0	–	5	–	0	2	–	7	–	0
+ – Conference co-champions

The 1963 UC Davis Aggies football team represented the University of California, Davis as a member of the Far Western Conference (FWC) during the 1963 NCAA College Division football season. Led by Will Lotter in his eighth and final season as head coach, the Aggies compiled an overall record of 6–2–1 with a mark of 3–1–1 in conference play, sharing the FWC title with Humboldt State and San Francisco State. The team outscored its opponents 151 to 74 for the season. The Aggies played home games at Toomey Field in Davis, California.

In eight seasons under coach Lotter, the Aggies compiled an overall record of 26–43–3, for a winning percentage of .382. They won or shared the conference championship twice, in 1956 and 1963.

The UC Davis sports teams were commonly called the "Cal Aggies" from 1924 until the mid-1970s.

== Schedule ==
Date	Opponent	Site	Result	Attendance	Source
September 20	Santa Clara*	Toomey Field; Davis, CA	W 28–8	6,500	
September 28	at Pomona*	Alumni Field (Note: Merritt Field was known as Alumni Field until 1991.); Claremont, CA	W 33–0	2,000	
October 5	Whittier*	Toomey Field; Davis, CA	L 14–17	5,000	
October 12	Chico State	Toomey Field; Davis, CA	W 28–13	4,000–4,200	
October 19	at Humboldt State	Redwood Bowl; Arcata, CA	L 0–10	5,500	
October 26	San Francisco State	Toomey Field; Davis, CA	T 10–10	4,500	
November 2	vs. UC Santa Barbara (Note: The game against UC Santa Barbara was part of an "All-UC Doubleheader" that was held annually from 1948 to 1963. The other game of the double-header was California vs. UCLA. The games were always held at the home stadium of either Cal or UCLA.)*	Los Angeles Memorial Coliseum; Los Angeles, CA	W 7–0	2,321	
November 9	at Nevada	Mackay Stadium (Note: This stadium is the predecessor to the current Mackay Stadium, which was opened for the 1966 season.); Reno, NV	W 14–8	2,500	
November 16	Sacramento State	Toomey Field; Davis, CA (rivalry)	W 17–8	8,000	
*Non-conference game
