= 1930 Chico State Wildcats football team =

American college football season

1930 Chico State Wildcats football
- Conference: Far Western Conference
- Record: 3–4 (0–2 FWC)
- Head coach: Art Acker (8th season)
- Home stadium: College Field

1930 Far Western Conference football standings
	Conf.					Overall
Team	W		L		T	W		L		T
Fresno State $	5	–	0	–	0	8	–	0	–	0
Nevada	2	–	1	–	0	2	–	4	–	2
Pacific (CA)	2	–	2	–	0	3	–	6	–	0
San Jose State	1	–	2	–	1	2	–	3	–	3
Chico State	0	–	2	–	0	3	–	4	–	0
Cal Aggies	0	–	3	–	1	0	–	7	–	1
$ – Conference champion

The 1930 Chico State Wildcats football team represented Chico State Teachers College—now known as California State University, Chico—as a member of the Far Western Conference (FWC) during the 1930 college football season. Led by eighth-year head coach Art Acker, Chico State compiled an overall record of 3–4 with a mark of 0–2 in conference play, tying for fifth place in the FWC. The team was outscored by its opponents 96 to 66 for the season. The Wildcats played home games at College Field in Chico, California.

== Schedule ==
Date	Opponent	Site	Result	Source
October 4	Humboldt State*	College Field; Chico, CA	W 58–0	
October 11	Menlo*	?	W 12–0	
October 18	at Fresno State	Fresno State College Stadium; Fresno, CA	L 7–13	
October 25	Oregon Normal*	College Field; Chico, CA	L 6–21	
November 1	at San Jose State	Spartan Field; San Jose, CA	L 0–19	
November 11	at Sacramento*	Sacramento Stadium; Sacramento, CA	L 6–13	
November 15	Southern Oregon Normal*	College Field; Chico, CA	W 7–0	
*Non-conference game
