= 1930 San Jose State Spartans football team =

American college football season

1930 San Jose State Spartans football
- Conference: Far Western Conference
- Record: 2–3–3 (1–2–1 FWC)
- Head coach: Mush Crawford (2nd season)
- Home stadium: Spartan Field

1930 Far Western Conference football standings
	Conf.					Overall
Team	W		L		T	W		L		T
Fresno State $	5	–	0	–	0	8	–	0	–	0
Nevada	2	–	1	–	0	2	–	4	–	2
Pacific (CA)	2	–	2	–	0	3	–	6	–	0
San Jose State	1	–	2	–	1	2	–	3	–	3
Chico State	0	–	2	–	0	3	–	4	–	0
Cal Aggies	0	–	3	–	1	0	–	7	–	1
$ – Conference champion

The 1930 San Jose State Spartans football team represented State Teachers College at San Jose (Note: San Jose State University was known as State Teachers College at San Jose from 1921 to 1934.) during the 1930 college football season.

San Jose State competed in the Far Western Conference (FWC). (Note: The Northern California Athletic Conference (NCAC) was known as the Far Western Conference (FWC) from its founding in 1925 to 1982.) The team was led by second-year head coach Mush Crawford, and they played home games at Spartan Field in San Jose, California. The team finished the season with a record of two wins, three losses and three ties (2–3–3, 1–2–1 FWC). The Spartans were outscored by their opponents 50–79 for the season, and were shut out in five of the eight games.

== Schedule ==
Date	Opponent	Site	Result	Source
September 29	at Los Angeles Fireman's Athletic Club*	Los Angeles, CA	L 0–19	
October 4	at Cal Aggies	Sacramento Stadium; Sacramento, CA	T 0–0	
October 18	Sacramento*	Spartan Field; San Jose, CA	T 0–0	
October 25	at Pacific (CA)	Baxter Stadium; Stockton, CA (rivalry)	L 0–27	
November 1	Chico State	Spartan Field; San Jose, CA	W 19–0	
November 8	at San Mateo*	Burlingame, CA	T 0–0	
November 15	Fresno State	Spartan Field; San Jose, CA (rivalry)	L 12–27	
November 27	Modesto*	Spartan Field; San Jose, CA	W 19–6	
*Non-conference game
