= 1963 Nevada Wolf Pack football team =

American college football season

1963 Nevada Wolf Pack football
- Conference: Far Western Conference
- Record: 3–6 (2–3 FWC)
- Head coach: Dick Trachok (5th season)
- Home stadium: Mackay Stadium

1963 Far Western Conference football standings
	Conf.					Overall
Team	W		L		T	W		L		T
Humboldt State +	3	–	1	–	1	6	–	1	–	2
San Francisco State +	3	–	1	–	1	6	–	2	–	1
UC Davis +	3	–	1	–	1	6	–	2	–	1
Sacramento State	2	–	2	–	1	6	–	2	–	1
Nevada	2	–	3	–	0	3	–	6	–	0
Chico State	0	–	5	–	0	2	–	7	–	0
+ – Conference co-champions

The 1963 Nevada Wolf Pack football team represented the University of Nevada during the 1963 NCAA College Division football season. Nevada competed as a member of the Far Western Conference (FWC). The Wolf Pack were led by fifth-year head coach Dick Trachok and played their home games at Mackay Stadium.

== Schedule ==
Date	Opponent	Site	Result	Attendance	Source
September 21	at Idaho State*	Spud Bowl; Pocatello, ID	L 19–36		
September 28	Willamette*	Mackay Stadium; Reno, NV	W 29–6		
October 5	Montana State*	Mackay Stadium; Reno, NV	L 13–41	1,800	
October 12	at Whittier*	Memorial Stadium; Whittier, CA	L 13–34		
October 19	Chico State^{†}	Mackay Stadium; Reno, NV	W 31–16	3,200	
October 26	at Humboldt State	Redwood Bowl; Arcata, CA	L 0–3	5,000	
November 2	at Sacramento State	Charles C. Hughes Stadium; Sacramento, CA	W 15–11		
November 9	UC Davis	Mackay Stadium; Reno, NV	L 8–14	2,500	
November 16	San Francisco State	Mackay Stadium; Reno, NV	L 6–21		
*Non-conference game; ^{†}Homecoming
