= 1963 Chico State Wildcats football team =

American college football season

1963 Chico State Wildcats football
- Conference: Far Western Conference
- Record: 2–7 (0–5 FWC)
- Head coach: George Maderos (6th season)
- Home stadium: College Field

1963 Far Western Conference football standings
	Conf.					Overall
Team	W		L		T	W		L		T
Humboldt State +	3	–	1	–	1	6	–	1	–	2
San Francisco State +	3	–	1	–	1	6	–	2	–	1
UC Davis +	3	–	1	–	1	6	–	2	–	1
Sacramento State	2	–	2	–	1	6	–	2	–	1
Nevada	2	–	3	–	0	3	–	6	–	0
Chico State	0	–	5	–	0	2	–	7	–	0
+ – Conference co-champions

The 1963 Chico State Wildcats football team represented Chico State College—now known as California State University, Chico—as a member of the Far Western Conference (FWC) during the 1963 NCAA College Division football season. Led by sixth-year head coach George Maderos, Chico State compiled an overall record of 2–7 with a mark of 0–5 in conference play, placing last out of six teams in the FWC. The team was outscored by its opponents 238 to 174 for the season. The Wildcats played home games at College Field in Chico, California.

== Schedule ==
Date	Opponent	Site	Result	Attendance	Source
September 21	Pacific (OR)*	College Field; Chico, CA	W 20–14	3,100	
September 28	Lewis & Clark*	College CA; Chico, CA	L 14–16	3,300	
October 5	at Santa Clara*	Buck Shaw Stadium; Santa Clara, CA	L 28–48	7,200	
October 12	at UC Davis	Toomey Field; Davis, CA	L 13–28	4,000–4,200	
October 19	at Nevada	Mackay Stadium (Note: This stadium is the predecessor to the current Mackay Stadium, which was opened for the 1966 season.); Reno, NV	L 16–31	3,200	
October 26	Sacramento State	College Field; Chico, CA	L 3–9	7,000	
November 2	at Southern Oregon*	Fuller Field; Ashland, OR	W 49–35	2,900	
November 9	San Francisco State	College Field; Chico, CA	L 18–25	3,500	
November 16	Humboldt State	College Field; Chico, CA	L 13–32	2,700–3,500	
*Non-conference game
