= 1930 Cal Aggies football team =

American college football season

1930 Cal Aggies football
- Conference: Far Western Conference
- Record: 0–7–1 (0–3–1 FWC)
- Head coach: Crip Toomey (3rd season)
- Captain: Pete Borges
- Home stadium: Sacramento Stadium

1930 Far Western Conference football standings
	Conf.					Overall
Team	W		L		T	W		L		T
Fresno State $	5	–	0	–	0	8	–	0	–	0
Nevada	2	–	1	–	0	2	–	4	–	2
Pacific (CA)	2	–	2	–	0	3	–	6	–	0
San Jose State	1	–	2	–	1	2	–	3	–	3
Chico State	0	–	2	–	0	3	–	4	–	0
Cal Aggies	0	–	3	–	1	0	–	7	–	1
$ – Conference champion

The 1930 Cal Aggies football team represented the Northern Branch of the College of Agriculture—now known as the University of California, Davis—as a member of the Far Western Conference (FWC) during the 1930 college football season. Led by third-year head coach Crip Toomey, the Aggies compiled an overall record of 0–7–1 with a mark of 0–3–1 in conference play, tying for fifth place in the FWC. The team was outscored by its opponents 134 to 17 for the season. They were shut out in their first five games and did not score more than a touchdown in any game. The Cal Aggies played home games at Sacramento Stadium in Sacramento, California.

== Schedule ==
Date	Time	Opponent	Site	Result	Attendance	Source
September 20		Santa Clara*	Sacramento Stadium; Sacramento, CA	L 0–27		
October 4		San Jose State	Sacramento Stadium; Sacramento, CA	T 0–0		
October 10		at Oregon State*	Bell Field; Corvallis, OR	L 0–20		
October 25		at Nevada	Mackay Stadium (Note: This stadium is the predecessor to the current Mackay Stadium, which was opened for the 1966 season.); Reno, NV	L 0–31		
October 31	8:00 p.m.	West Coast Army*	Sacramento Stadium; Sacramento, CA	L 0–12		
November 8		at Fresno State	Fresno State College Stadium; Fresno, CA	L 7–27	6,000	
November 15		Loyola (CA)*	Sacramento Stadium; Sacramento, CA	L 4–7		
November 21	2:00 p.m.	Pacific (CA)	Sacramento Stadium; Sacramento, CA	L 6–10		
*Non-conference game; All times are in Pacific time
