= Devonshire Downs =

Horse racing track and multipurpose event facility in Northridge, California

Devonshire Downs, sometimes informally called The Downs, was a horse racing track and multipurpose event facility in Northridge, California. It was located at the southwest corner of Devonshire Street and Zelzah Avenue, east of Reseda Boulevard. The site is now owned by the California State University, Northridge (CSUN), which renamed it North Campus, and leased in part to Medtronic MiniMed.

== 1940s ==
In 1943, Helen Dillman and Pete Spears purchased 40 acres for $80,000 with plans to construct a harness racing track, but a wartime construction moratorium temporarily put the project on hold. Weekly Sunday afternoon harness races, called matinees, began in 1946. The State of California bought the property for $140,000 in 1948, at which time it also became the home of the 51st District Agricultural Association's annual San Fernando Valley Fair.

== 1950s ==
During the 1950s, as the San Fernando Valley's population boomed and tract housing rapidly replaced Northridge's citrus groves and small ranches, the venue increasingly served to host a wide variety of mostly non-equestrian expositions, festivals, carnivals, concerts, swap meets, rallies and other events. These alternative uses eventually predominated. A new California State College campus was built on adjacent land and opened in 1958 as San Fernando Valley State College, which soon became the owner of Devonshire Downs.

== 1960s ==
During the 1960s, poor track maintenance and declining interest in the sport led to the end of horse racing at the facility. The last race horse was removed in 1971. In the same year, the college, which became California State University, Northridge (CSUN) in 1972, built a football stadium on some of the acreage. Other parts of the property continued to be put to diverse uses.

Devonshire Downs is most widely known for hosting the three-day Newport Pop Festival in June 1969, also known as Newport '69, featuring Jethro Tull, Jimi Hendrix, Joe Cocker and nearly thirty other top acts. With over 200,000 people attending the festival over three days, it was, by far, the largest music event in the United States up to that time. News reports at the time indicated that hundreds were injured in a melee during the festival, and 200 police officers were deployed to restore order.

== 1970s ==
While the San Fernando Valley Fair utilized Devonshire Downs as its venue as early as the 1950s, the fair hit its heyday in the 1970s and 1980s, finally moving away from Northridge in the late 1980s. Political pressures pushed to sell the property, starting in the early 1960s and continuing into the mid-1970s, but CSUN maintained ownership throughout this time period and beyond.

== Later years ==
During the first half of the 1980s, Devonshire Downs was the venue for numerous hardcore punk rock shows.

In 2001, the football stadium and practically everything else was razed and most of the land was leased out for development as a private industrial park, with part of the area taken over by Medtronic MiniMed. CSUN also developed part of the property for housing needs related to the University.
