= 1983 NCAA Division II football rankings =

The 1983 NCAA Division II football rankings are from the NCAA Division II football committee. This is for the 1983 season.

== Legend ==
	Increase in ranking
	Decrease in ranking
	Not ranked previous week
(#–#)	Win–loss record
(Italics)	Number of first place votes
т	Tied with team above or below also with this symbol

== NCAA Division II Football Committee poll ==
	Week 1 Sept 21	Week 2 Sept 28	Week 3 Oct 5	Week 4 Oct 12	Week 5 Oct 19	Week 6 Oct 26	Week 7 Nov 2	Week 8 Nov 9	Week 9 Nov 16	
1.	Southwest Texas State (1–0)	Southwest Texas State (2–0)	Southwest Texas State (3–0)	Southwest Texas State (4–0)	Southwest Texas State (5–0)	Mississippi College (8–0)	UC Davis (7–0) т	UC Davis (8–0) т	UC Davis (9–0)	1.
2.	Mississippi College (3–0)	Mississippi College (4–0)	Mississippi College (5–0)	Mississippi College (6–0)	Mississippi College (7–0)	UC Davis (6–0)	Southwest Texas State (7–0–1) т	Southwest Texas State (7–1) т	Southwest Texas State (8–1)	2.
3.	North Dakota State (2–0)	North Dakota State (3–0)	Abilene Christian (3–0)	Abilene Christian (4–0)	UC Davis (5–0)	Clarion State (7–0)	North Alabama (8–1)	North Alabama (8–0–1)	North Alabama (9–0–1)	3.
4.	Abilene Christian (2–0)	Abilene Christian (3–0)	UC Davis (3–0)	UC Davis (4–0)	Clarion State (6–0)	North Alabama (6–0–1)	Towson State (7–1)	Towson State (9–1)	Towson State (9–1)	4.
5.	Cal Poly (2–0) (Note: In the actual printed polls, Cal Poly was listed as Cal Poly, San Luis Obispo)	Cal Poly (3–0)	North Alabama (3–0)	Clarion State (5–0)	Nebraska–Omaha (6–1)	Southwest Texas State (5–1)	North Dakota State (8–1) т	North Dakota State (8–1)	North Dakota State (9–1)	5.
6.	West Chester State (2–0)	Troy State (4–0) т	Clarion State (4–0)	Nebraska–Omaha (5–1)	North Alabama (5–0–1)	Butler (7–0)	Virginia Union (8–1) т	Virginia Union (8–1)	Virginia Union (9–1)	6.
7.	Troy State (3–0)	West Chester State (3–0) т	St. Cloud State (4–0)	North Alabama (4–0–1)	Virginia Union (6–1)	Virginia Union (7–1)	Mississippi College (7–1)	Clarion State (8–1)	Central State (OH) (10–0)	7.
8.	South Dakota State (3–0)	South Dakota State (4–0)	Nebraska–Omaha (4–1) т	Virginia Union (5–1)	Butler (6–0) т	Towson State (7–1)	Clarion State (7–0–1)	Butler (8–0–1) т	Butler (9–0–1)	8.
9.	Winston–Salem State (3–0)	UC Davis (2–0)	Virginia Union (4–1) т	North Dakota State (4–1)	Towson State (6–1) т	North Dakota State (6–1)	Butler (7-0-1)	Central State (OH) (9–0) т	Fort Valley State (7–1)	9.
10.	UC Davis (1–0)	Edinboro (3–0) т	Cal Poly (3–1) т	Butler (5–0) т	Abilene Christian (4–1) т	East Texas State (5–1)	Cal State Hayward (6–1) (Note: In the actual printed polls, Cal State Hayward was listed as Hayward State)	Abilene Christian (6–2)	Nebraska–Omaha (9–2)	10.
11.		North Alabama (3–0) т	North Dakota State (3–1) т	Towson State (5–1) т	North Dakota State (5–1) т					11.
	Week 1 Sept 21	Week 2 Sept 28	Week 3 Oct 5	Week 4 Oct 12	Week 5 Oct 19	Week 6 Oct 26	Week 7 Nov 2	Week 8 Nov 9	Week 9 Nov 16	
		Dropped: 9 Winston–Salem State	Dropped: 6 Troy State; 7 West Chester State; 8 South Dakota State; 10 Edinboro	Dropped: 7 St. Cloud State; 10 Cal Poly	None	Dropped: 5 Nebraska–Omaha; 10 Abilene Christian	Dropped: 10 East Texas State	Dropped: 7 Mississippi College; 10 Cal State Hayward	Dropped: 7 Clarion State; 10 Abilene Christian	
