= 1985 Humboldt State Lumberjacks football team =

American college football season

1985 Humboldt State Lumberjacks football
- Conference: Northern California Athletic Conference
- Record: 2–8 (1–4 NCAC)
- Head coach: Bud Van Deren (20th season)
- Home stadium: Redwood Bowl

1985 Northern California Athletic Conference football standings
| | Conf. | | | | | Overall |
| Team | W | | L | | T | W | | L | | T |
|---|---|---|---|---|---|---|---|---|---|---|
| No. 1 UC Davis $^ | 5 | – | 0 | – | 0 | 9 | – | 2 | – | 0 |
| Chico State | 3 | – | 1 | – | 1 | 4 | – | 4 | – | 1 |
| Cal State Hayward | 2 | – | 2 | – | 1 | 6 | – | 3 | – | 1 |
| San Francisco State | 2 | – | 3 | – | 0 | 3 | – | 6 | – | 1 |
| Sonoma State | 1 | – | 4 | – | 0 | 3 | – | 7 | – | 0 |
| Humboldt State | 1 | – | 4 | – | 0 | 2 | – | 8 | – | 0 |
$ – Conference champion; ^ – NCAA Division II playoff participant; Rankings from NCAA Division II Football Committee poll

The 1985 Humboldt State Lumberjacks football team represented Humboldt State University—now known as California State Polytechnic University, Humboldt—as a member of the Northern California Athletic Conference (NCAC) during the 1985 NCAA Division II football season. Led by Bud Van Deren in his 20th and final season as head coach, Lumberjacks compiled an overall record of 2–8 with a mark of 1–4 in conference play, tying for fifth place in the NCAC. The team was outscored by its opponents 350 to 175 for the season. Humboldt State played home games at the Redwood Bowl in Arcata, California.

In 20 years under Van Deren, the Lumberjacks compiled a record of 98–101–4 (.493). They had nine winning seasons, and won the conference championship once, in 1968. The same year, Humboldt State had its only bowl game win in program history, in the Camellia Bowl.

== Schedule ==
| Date | Opponent | Site | Result | Attendance | Source |
|---|---|---|---|---|---|
| September 21 | Santa Clara* | Redwood Bowl; Arcata, CA | L 0–37 | 2,989–4,500 | |
| September 28 | Whittier* | Redwood Bowl; Arcata, CA | L 28–29 | 2,850 | |
| October 5 | at UC Santa Barbara* | Campus Stadium; Santa Barbara, CA | W 24–3 | | |
| October 12 | at No. 8 UC Davis | Toomey Field; Davis, CA | L 14–45 | 8,612–9,250 | |
| October 19 | Sacramento State* | Redwood Bowl; Arcata, CA | L 30–39 | 2,190–4,200 | |
| October 26 | Saint Mary’s* | Redwood Bowl; Arcata, CA | L 20–28 | 3,200 | |
| November 2 | at Chico State | University Stadium; Chico, CA | L 13–41 | 2,141 | |
| November 9 | at No. 17 Cal State Hayward | Pioneer Stadium; Hayward, CA | L 21–37 | 850 | |
| November 16 | Sonoma State | Redwood Bowl; Arcata, CA | L 7–25 | 2,100–2,162 | |
| November 23 | San Francisco State | Redwood Bowl; Arcata, CA | W 28–14 | 1,032 | |
*Non-conference game; Rankings from NCAA Division II Football Committee Poll released prior to the game
