= 1985 Chico State Wildcats football team =

American college football season

1985 Chico State Wildcats football
- Conference: Northern California Athletic Conference
- Record: 4–4–1 (3–1–1 NCAC)
- Head coach: Mike Bellotti (2nd season)
- Offensive coordinator: Nick Aliotti (2nd season)
- Home stadium: University Stadium

1985 Northern California Athletic Conference football standings
	Conf.					Overall
Team	W		L		T	W		L		T
No. 1 UC Davis $^	5	–	0	–	0	9	–	2	–	0
Chico State	3	–	1	–	1	4	–	4	–	1
Cal State Hayward	2	–	2	–	1	6	–	3	–	1
San Francisco State	2	–	3	–	0	3	–	6	–	1
Sonoma State	1	–	4	–	0	3	–	7	–	0
Humboldt State	1	–	4	–	0	2	–	8	–	0
$ – Conference champion; ^ – NCAA Division II playoff participant; Rankings from NCAA Division II Football Committee poll

The 1985 Chico State Wildcats football team represented California State University, Chico as a member of the Northern California Athletic Conference (NCAC) during the 1985 NCAA Division II football season. Led by second-year head coach Mike Bellotti, Chico State compiled an overall record of 4–4–1 with a mark of 3–1–1 in conference play, placing second in the NCAC. The team outscored its opponents 202 to 201 for the season. The Wildcats played home games at University Stadium in Chico, California.

== Schedule ==
Date	Opponent	Site	Result	Attendance	Source
September 7	at Eastern Washington*	Joe Albi Stadium; Spokane, WA	L 3–28	2,122	
September 14	at Santa Clara*	Buck Shaw Stadium; Santa Clara, CA	L 18–44	5,139	
October 5	at Sonoma State	Cossacks Stadium; Rohnert Park, CA	W 27–16	1,081	
October 19	No. 6 UC Davis	University Stadium; Chico, CA	L 8–27	8,312–8,352	
October 26	at Sacramento State*	Hornet Stadium; Sacramento, CA	L 14–16	2,403	
November 2	Humboldt State	University Stadium; Chico, CA	W 41–13	2,141	
November 9	at Saint Mary's*	Saint Mary's Stadium; Moraga, CA	W 26–19	1,985	
November 16	at San Francisco State	Cox Stadium; San Francisco, CA	W 34–7	1,482	
November 23	at Cal State Hayward	Pioneer Stadium; Hayward, CA	T 31–31	600	
*Non-conference game; Rankings from NCAA Division II Football Committee Poll released prior to the game
