= North Dakota State Bison football =

College Football team of North Dakota State University

2026 North Dakota State Bison football team
- First season: 1894; 132 years ago
- Head coach: Tim Polasek; 3rd season, 32–4 (.889)
- Location: Fargo, North Dakota
- Stadium: Fargodome (capacity: 18,700)
- Field: Gate City Bank Field
- NCAA division: Division I FBS
- Conference: Mountain West
- Colors: Green and Gold
- All-time record: 812–385–34 (.673)
- Bowl record: 5–1 (.833)

NCAA Division I FCS championships
- 2011, 2012, 2013, 2014, 2015, 2017, 2018, 2019, 2021, 2024

NCAA Division II championships
- 1983, 1985, 1986, 1988, 1990

Small college national championships
- 1965, 1968, 1969

Conference championships
- NCC: 1925, 1932, 1935, 1964, 1965, 1966, 1967, 1968, 1969, 1970, 1973, 1974, 1976, 1977, 1981, 1982, 1983, 1984, 1985, 1986, 1988, 1990, 1991, 1992, 1994 Great West: 2006 MVFC: 2011, 2012, 2013, 2014, 2015, 2016, 2017, 2018, 2019, 2021, 2024, 2025
- Rivalries: South Dakota State (rivalry); North Dakota (rivalry); Wyoming (rivalry)

Uniforms
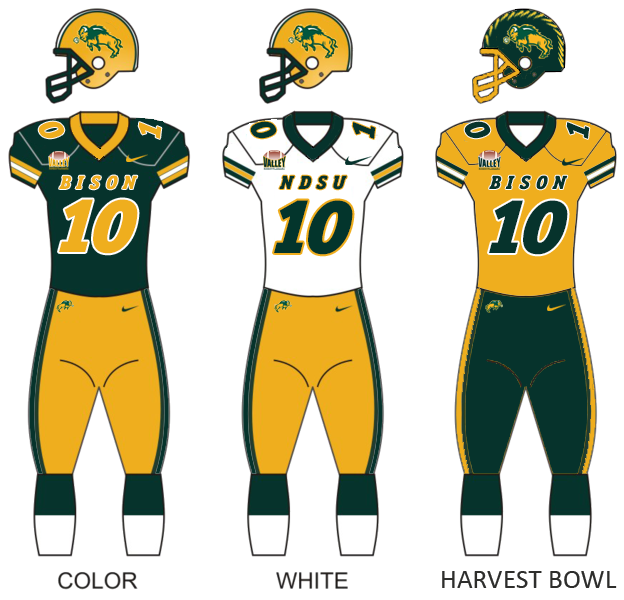
- Fight song: On Bison
- Mascot: Thundar
- Marching band: Gold Star Marching Band
- Uniform outfitter: Under Armour
- Website: gobison.com

The North Dakota State Bison football program represents North Dakota State University in college football at the NCAA Division I Football Bowl Subdivision level and competes in the Mountain West Conference. The Bison play in the 18,700-seat Fargodome located in Fargo. The Bison have won 18 national championships (10 in NCAA Division I FCS, 5 in NCAA Division II, and 3 AP small college) and 39 conference championships. They have won 10 NCAA Division I FCS National Championships between 2011 and 2024. The Bison hold the record for most overall NCAA national championships and the record for the most consecutive championships with five titles between 2011 and 2015 for Division I FCS.

Since 2011, the North Dakota State Bison have a record of 186–21 (.899) which included a record 22-game playoff win streak, making them the most successful college football program in Division I FCS in the last two decades. The Bison are 239–48 (.833) since moving to Division I in 2004. Since 1964, the Bison have had only three losing seasons and an overall record of 588–145–4 (.801) through that 58-year span, one of the best in all of college football. Among FCS programs, North Dakota State has more all-time program wins than any non-Ivy League program, over 750. Of all teams established after 1894, only Oklahoma has won a higher percentage of its games than NDSU. The team also holds the record for the longest winning streak in the Football Championship Subdivision, which stands at 39 consecutive games spanning from 2017 to 2021.

In the final AP Football Poll of the 2013–14 season, after their third consecutive National Championship, North Dakota State finished with 17 votes, which ranked them at #29 in all of Division I football, the highest end-of-season ranking of any team in the history of FCS football. After defeating 13th-ranked (FBS) Iowa in 2016, the Bison earned 74 votes and a #27 ranking in the entire D-I field, overtaking their previous record to become the highest-ranked FCS team of all time.

Collectively, the Bison have won 37 conference championships, and 18 national championships. They were selected as NCAA College Division II champions by polling three times (1965, 1968, 1969), won the NCAA Division II National Football Championship five times (1983, 1985, 1986, 1988, 1990), and have won the NCAA Division I Football Championship ten times in fourteen seasons (2011, 2012, 2013, 2014, 2015, 2017, 2018, 2019, 2021, 2024). The 2019 Bison are the first of any Division I team since 1894 Yale to finish 16–0. From 2012 to 2014, the Bison had a formerly FCS record of 33 straight wins (which is tied for the third longest in modern NCAA history). They subsequently had a 39-game winning streak that ran from 2017 to 2020.

The Bison joined the Mountain West Conference and moved to the Football Bowl Subdivision (FBS) on July 1, 2026.

== History ==
=== Early history (1894–1921) ===
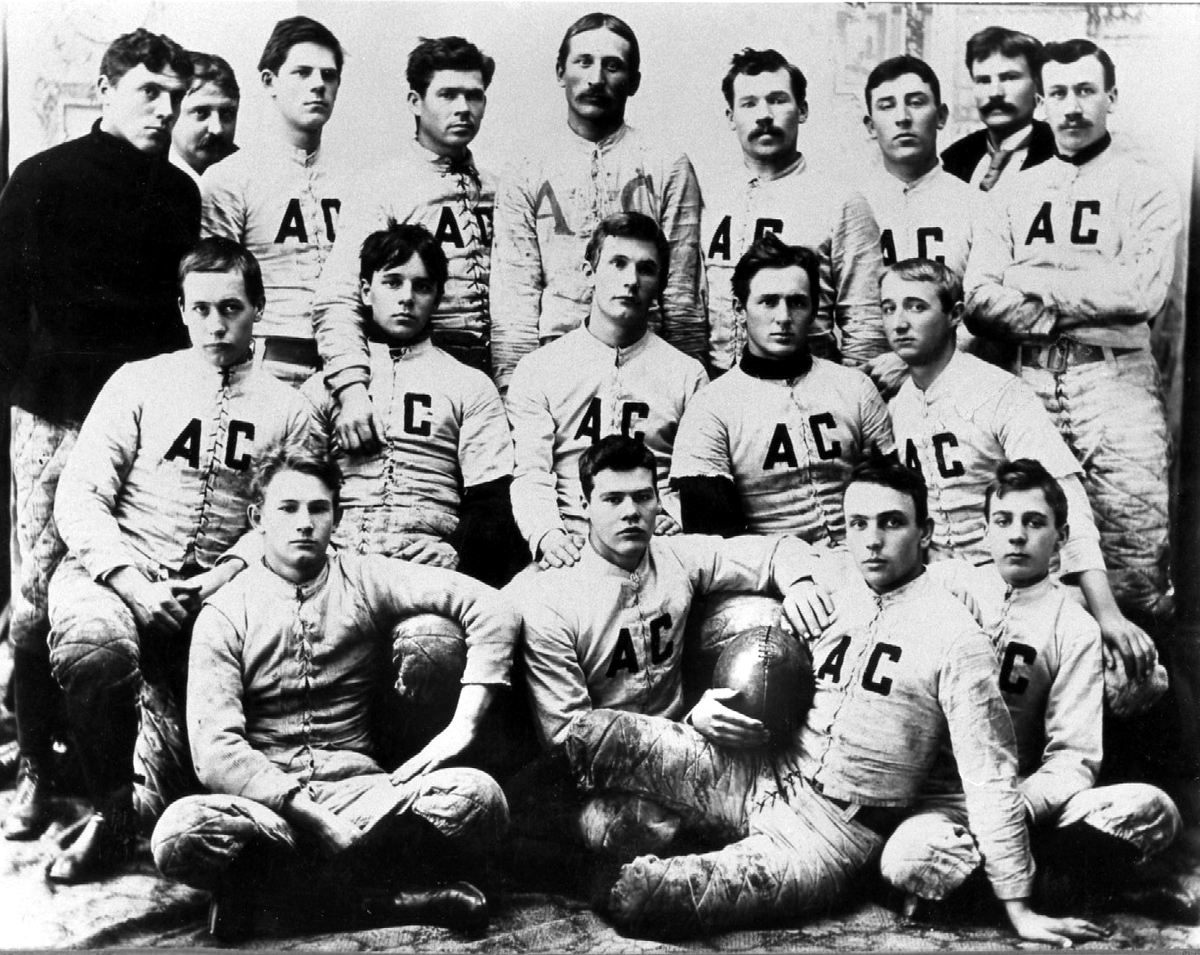
NDSU's first football team, 1894

The Bison fielded their first team in 1894 and were originally known as the NDAC Farmers. From the early 1900s to 1921, the nickname of the school then known as North Dakota Agricultural College was the Aggies. The first coach for the new NDAC football team was Henry Bolley, who also fielded the first football program at Purdue University in 1887 and was their first Quarterback. He challenged the University of North Dakota to a football match in 1890, but did not have enough players until 1894, the first official year of football at NDSU. In 1902, Eddie Cochems, known as the father of the forward pass was hired as head coach of the Bison where he experimented building an offense around his new technique; which subsequently became legal in the 1906 college football season; Cochems went 9–1 in his two-year stint as head coach. The college hired famed Michigan halfback Paul Magoffin, the first player to ever catch a forward pass in 1907, as head coach, but he left for the head coaching position offered to him by George Washington University a year later. The 1918 season was canceled due to the outbreak of the Spanish Flu in conjunction with the first World War. The 1943 and 1944 seasons were also canceled due to World War II and the shortage of eligible players. Keeping with their Michigan favoritism, the NDAC hired Stanley Borleske in 1919 to coach the football, basketball, and baseball teams. After six years of on and off coaching. and a 36–36–7 record, Borleske left for Fresno State but is largely credited with developing the Bison mascot. It was well known he was not a fan of the "Aggies" mascot, wanting something 'strong and fierce' he came up with the 'Bison' which remains the mascot today. He also coined the term "Thundering Herd" which is still a common reference to the NDSU Bison Football fanbase.

=== Division II (1922–2003) ===
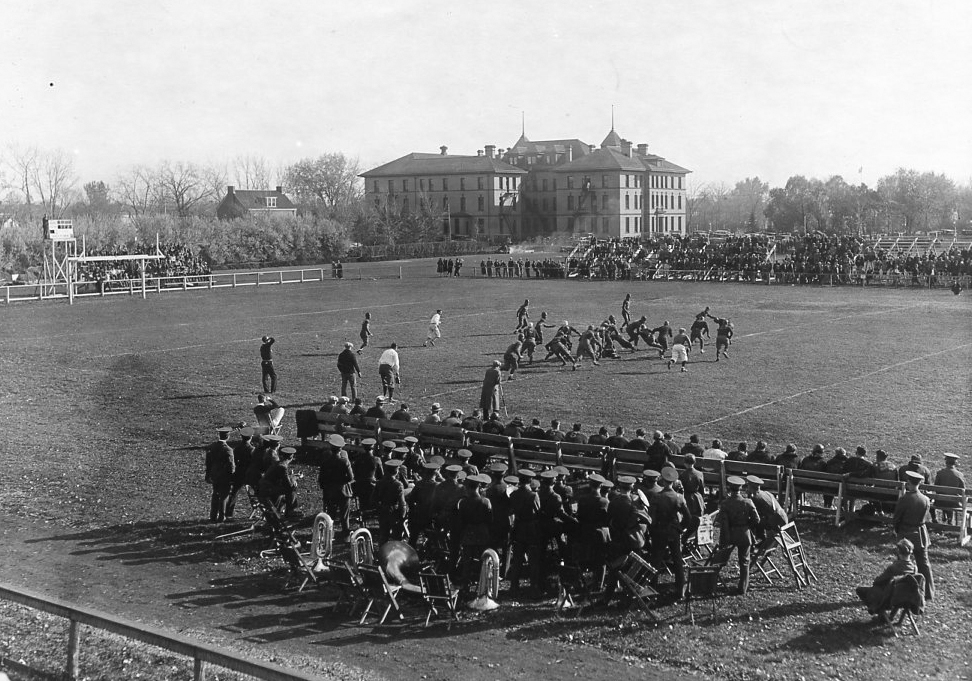
October 20, 1928 – NDAC (NDSU) vs. St. Thomas (view looking SE with Ceres Hall in the distance). Courtesy: NDSU Institute for Regional Studies

In 1921, NDSU became a charter member of the now-defunct North Central Conference, which they remained affiliated with for 82 years until 2003. Their primary rival during this time were the University of North Dakota Fighting Sioux (now the Fighting Hawks) whom they competed with to win the Nickel Trophy. As members of Division II, they won 8 national championships with an overall record of 347–94–4 having only two losing seasons from 1964 to 2003.

=== Division I-FCS (2004–2026) ===
In 2004, all North Dakota State athletic teams moved to Division I. From 2004 to 2007, the Bison were members of the Great West Football Conference.

Since 2008 they have been affiliated with the Missouri Valley Football Conference. Since moving to Division I, their primary rival are the South Dakota State University Jackrabbits whom they compete with each year for the Dakota Marker. The team's former head coach was Craig Bohl, who led the Bison from 2003 to 2013. Bohl holds the school record for most wins by a head coach, going 104–32 in his tenure at NDSU.

Bohl's successor Chris Klieman went 69–6 in his five seasons (2014–2018). During the Bison's successful run to the 2018 FCS title, Klieman was named as the successor to the retiring Bill Snyder as head coach at Kansas State, though both schools agreed that Klieman would remain at NDSU while the Bison were involved in the FCS playoffs. Bison defensive coordinator Matt Entz took over as head coach following that season's championship game.

The NDSU Bison are the only FCS program to ever be ranked higher than #34 in the AP National Football Poll. After the 2011 championship game, the Bison became only the third team in FCS history to receive votes in the final AP Top 25 with 2, putting them at #32 overall, an FCS record at the time; the others being Appalachian State who receive 5 votes after their third consecutive FCS Championship in 2007 and ended at #34 and James Madison University after their 2010 upset of then #13 Virginia Tech.

After the 2012 season, the Bison again broke the barrier and became the first-ever FCS team to breach the poll twice by receiving 1 vote and ending at #36 in the nation. Due to the overwhelming support and attention NDSU got during this run, ESPN announced that it would host its ESPN College GameDay program in downtown Fargo on September 21, 2013. The Bison ended up beating Delaware State 51–0 later that day.

==== 2013 season ====
The Bison finished the 2013 regular season with an undefeated 11–0 record, their first perfect season since 1990. The Bison became the first FCS team to ever finish the regular season ranked on the AP Poll at #34 with 1 vote.

The 2013 team also had a perfect 15–0 season, becoming the first program to do that since Marshall in 1996. They won their third consecutive national championship, tying an FCS record. A majority of the starters played in all 3 national championship games and went 43–2 in their three-year stint, a number unrivaled in Division I FCS football. The Bison only lost 2 games in the three-year span by a combined 6 points.

After the 2013 season, the Bison were ranked #29 in the National Division I AP Poll, tallying a massive 17 votes, far beyond what any other FCS team had ever received. They later outdid themselves when they defeated Iowa in 2016, putting the Bison 27th in the AP Poll with 74 votes, the highest ranking of any team in FCS history.

Through 2013, the Bison outscored their opponents by a combined 581–169 (+412) on the season. Only two other teams in FCS history have had a larger point spread through a season, 1996 Marshall (+448) and 1999 Georgia Southern (+485). Unlike the Marshall and Georgia Southern teams, NDSU's defense held their opponents to just 127 points in the regular season (11.5 ppg) and just 11 points on average through the playoffs that year. NDSU won its playoff games with an average margin of victory of 32.75 points, which just falls behind the 1996 Marshall team, which averaged a 34-point spread.

In 2013, the Bison tallied three shutouts, and held nine teams to 10 points or less, including a streak of nine consecutive quarters without allowing a point. The offense was known for a ground-and-pound strategy, which wore opponents down and controlled the time of possession. The team averaged over 34 minutes of possession per game, while allowing an average of just 250 yards of opposing offense.

In the 12 playoff games they played from 2011 to 2013, they allowed an average of 9.3 points per game, an FCS record. The only playoff loss the seniors experienced in their four-year career was the 38–31 overtime loss at eventual champion Eastern Washington in 2010 in the FCS quarterfinals. The span of seasons that followed for NDSU in the years after that overtime loss are easily the best and most dominant years Division I football has seen from a single team.

After the 2013 season, following three consecutive national titles Head Coach Craig Bohl was hired away to lead the Mountain West's Wyoming Cowboys. Bohl finished his time at NDSU having successfully transitioned the program from Division II to Division I and built into the premier FCS powerhouse in the nation. He finished at NDSU with a career record of 104–32.

==== Chris Klieman era (2014–2018) ====
Following Bohl's departure, defensive coordinator Chris Klieman was promoted to head coach.

===== 2014 season =====
In 2014, after beating their 5th consecutive FBS team, Iowa State, and their subsequent game against Weber State; which was their 26th straight victory, ESPN again announced they would bring College GameDay back to downtown Fargo on September 13, 2014, to cover the Bison's amazing run for the second straight year. The visit marked first time the show has ever visited the same FCS school twice and only the sixth time they have visited a non-FBS school since 1993.

The Bison won an FCS record 33 straight games from 2012 to 2014, which is also the third longest in the history of Division I NCAA football. From 2010 to 2014, the Bison did not lose a single road game, a span of 22 games. They also had a winning streak of 26 home games (2012–2015) and have a record streak of 22 wins in the FCS playoffs. The Bison have won 16 straight home openers since their 1999 loss to Ferris State and are 21–1 in home openers since the Fargodome opened in 1992.

===== 2015 season =====
2015 would start with a surprise loss to #13 Montana broadcast nationally on ESPN; however, the season would extend both the MVFC and National Championship runs to five consecutive titles, culminating in a 37–10 national title game against Jacksonville State. After this season, quarterback Carson Wentz was selected second overall by the Philadelphia Eagles in the 2016 NFL draft.

===== 2016 season =====
2016 brought about one of the high points in Bison football history when, in week three, NDSU defeated #13 ranked Iowa on the road. Despite the impressive win, 2016 would be the worst season for the team since 2010. Not only would the team have the fewest wins since 2010 (12), they also lost the Dakota Marker for the first time since 2009. Ultimately the season would bring about the end of the Bison's historic title run with a semifinal loss against the eventual champion James Madison Dukes.

===== 2017 season =====
2017 would be a return to form for NDSU, where only two games all season were decided by one possession, the best mark since the 2013 season. On December 15, NDSU became the only team in FCS history to make 7 consecutive semifinal appearances in the playoffs. In the title match, the Bison would get revenge for the previous season, defeating James Madison 17–13 in Frisco.

===== 2018 season =====
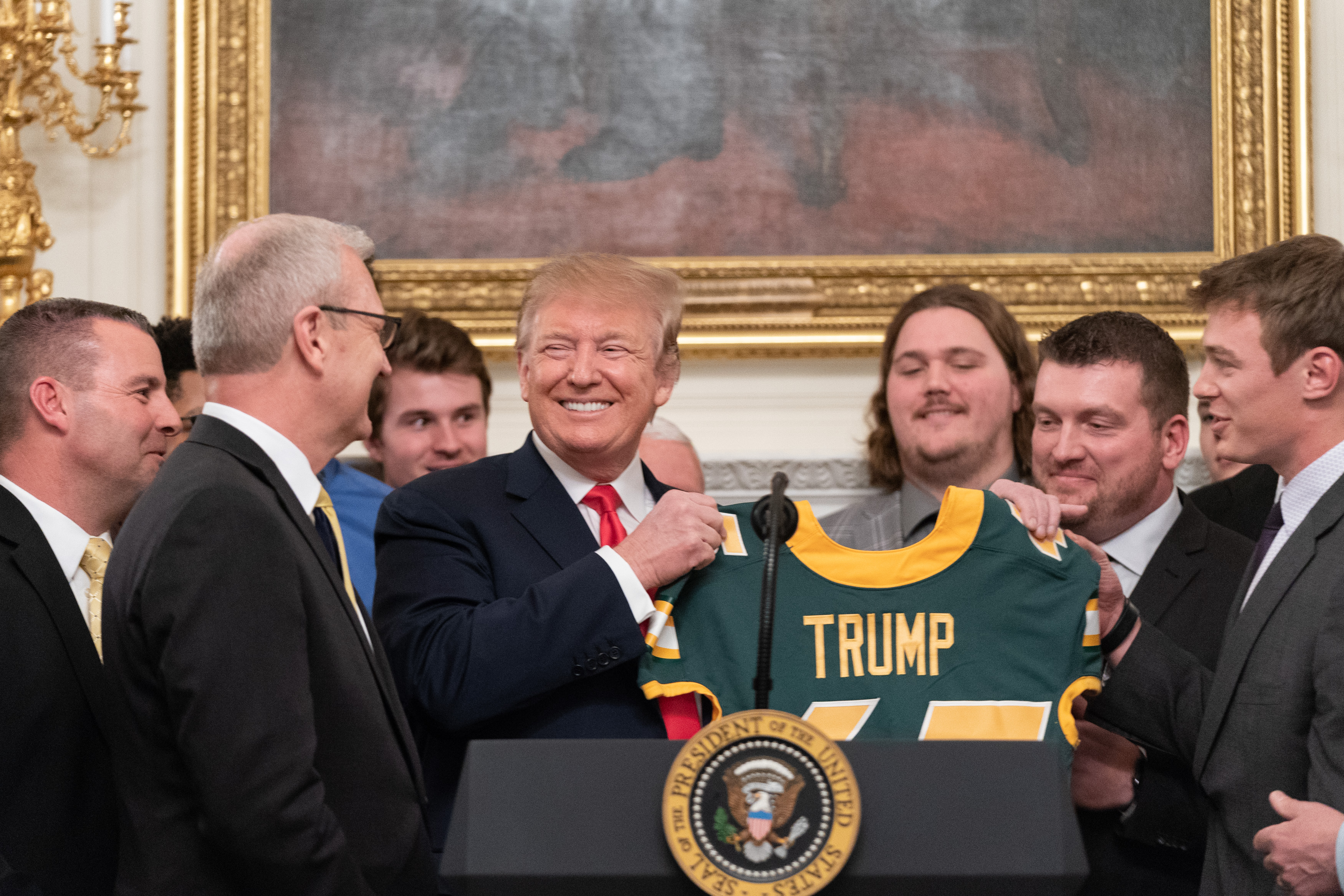
NDSU players with President Donald Trump at the White House in 2019

The 2018 season would arguably top the 2013 season as the best in school history. NDSU went 15–0 for the second time in school history and had only one game all season decided by less than one touchdown (the Dakota Marker matchup against #3 South Dakota State). NDSU captured their seventh title in eight years, defeating Eastern Washington 38–24 on January 9, 2019. It was also Chris Klieman's fourth title in five years.

The 2018 Bison defeated opponents by an average score of 41.5 – 12.6, good for a score differential of 28.9 points. The season saw quarterback Easton Stick finish his college career with a record of 49–3, the highest win total for any quarterback in FCS history. Before the semifinal matchup against South Dakota State, Klieman was hired by former Bison athletic director Gene Taylor to lead the Kansas State Wildcats. He was allowed to finish the season with NDSU.

On March 4, 2019, President Donald Trump hosted the NDSU football team at the White House. They were served fast food, as was FBS champion Clemson. Easton Stick presented a number 45 NDSU football jersey to Trump. The visit was orchestrated by Senator John Hoeven.

==== Matt Entz era (2019–2023) ====
On December 13, 2018, NDSU announced defensive coordinator Matt Entz would replace Chris Klieman as head coach.

===== 2019 season =====
The Bison started the 2019 season with 57–10 victory over Butler in front of record-breaking "home" crowd of 34,544 at Minneapolis's Target Field. 2019 saw the first game against in-state rival North Dakota since 2015. The Bison were victorious over the Fighting Hawks 38–7 in front of the largest Fargodome crowd (18,923) since NDSU hosted Northern Iowa for Homecoming in 2015 (18,954).

On October 20, 2019, it was announced that ESPN would be bringing their College GameDay program to Brookings, South Dakota to cover the Dakota Marker featuring #3 South Dakota State and #1 North Dakota State. The Bison defeated SDSU 23–16. On January 11, 2020, NDSU won another FCS title after defeating James Madison University 28–20, and also became the first Division I team since 1894 Yale to finish 16–0, their second undefeated season in a row.

===== 2020 season =====
On May 2, 2021, the NDSU Bison, under Entz, ended a three-championship win streak by losing 24–20 to Sam Houston State University in the quarterfinals of the 2020 FCS playoffs. This is the first time since 2010 that the NDSU Bison did not make the semifinals.

On May 13, 2021, former Bison QB Trey Lance was drafted with the 3rd overall pick in the 2021 NFL draft by the San Francisco 49ers after leaving the team before the Spring season began.

===== 2021 season =====
On October 2, 2021, the NDSU Bison played in-state rival North Dakota (UND) in Grand Forks for the first time since 2003, with NDSU and UND, respectively, ranked 5th and 10th at the time. The Bison won this matchup, 16–10. On November 6, 2021, the 22nd edition of the battle for the Dakota Marker ended with a SDSU victory, 27–19. NDSU was ranked 2nd at the time and SDSU ranked 9th. This marked the first time SDSU had won multiple games in a row in the Marker series since 2016–17 when the Jacks won back-to-back marker games against the Bison.

On January 8, 2022, the Bison played the Montana State Bobcats for the FCS championship. They ended up winning, 38–10, as fullback Hunter Luepke ran for three touchdowns in the first half.

===== 2022 season =====
On January 8, 2023, the Bison lost the 2023 NCAA Division I Football Championship Game to rival South Dakota State, 21–45. This was NDSU's first loss in a Division I championship game, and only their third at any level.

===== 2023 season =====
On September 2, 2023, the Bison hosted Eastern Washington in Minneapolis, Minnesota for the first ever college football game to be played at U.S. Bank Stadium. NDSU would go on to win the game, 35–10.

On October 15, 2023, the Bison fell to their in-state rival UND for the first time in over two decades.

The 2023 season was the first fall season since 2010 that the Bison were unseeded heading in to the playoffs. They then became just the fourth unseeded team to reach the FCS semifinals since the playoffs added byes.

On December 10, 2023, North Dakota State announced that Entz would be leaving Fargo for the vacant USC linebackers position coach job. He was allowed to finish the 2023 playoff run at NDSU. The Bison would fall at Montana later in the week in double overtime.

==== Tim Polasek era (2024–present) ====
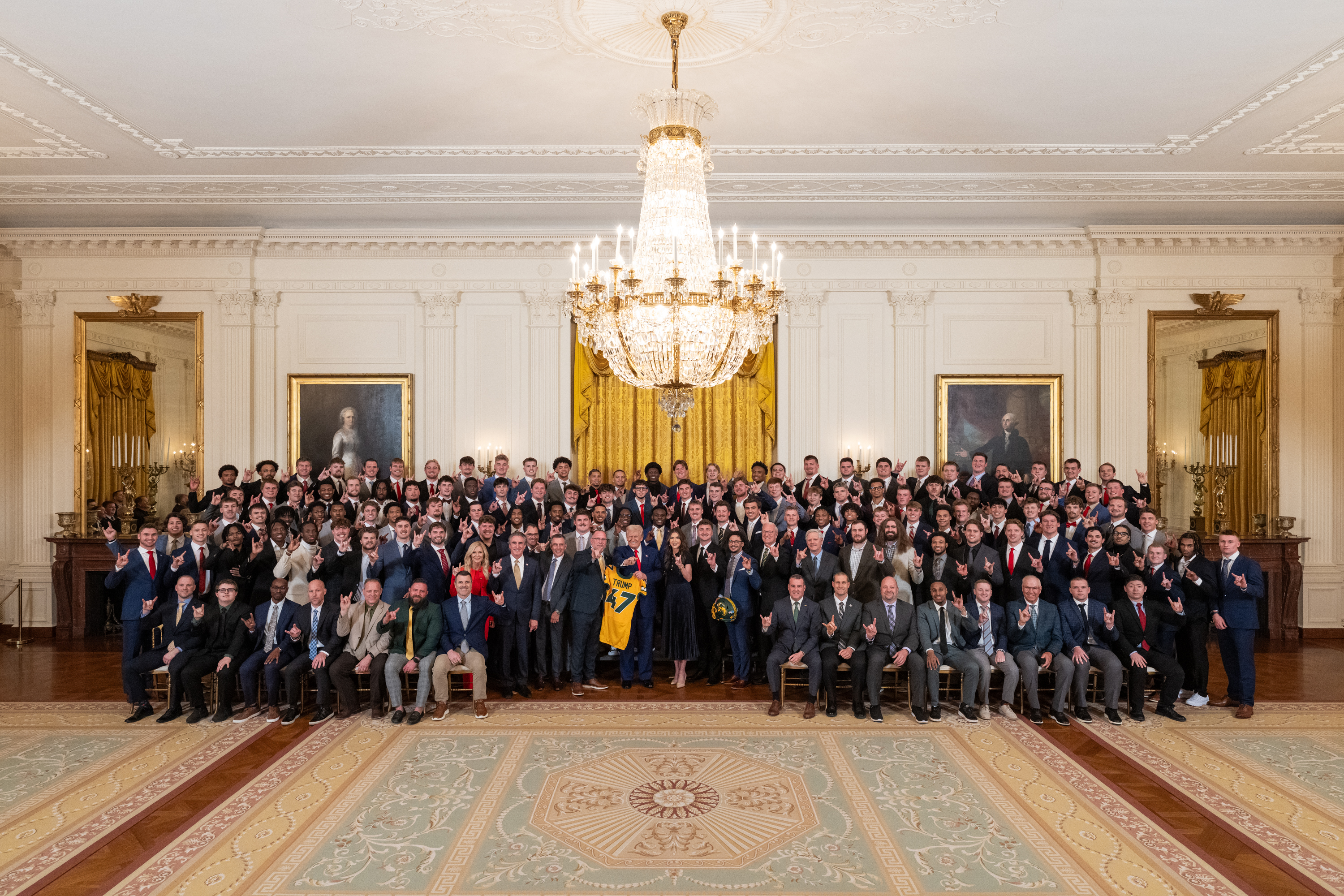
The 2024 North Dakota State Bison at White House in April 2025

On December 17, 2023, North Dakota State announced that Wyoming offensive coordinator/quarterbacks coach Tim Polasek would take over as the next head coach of the Bison. Polasek had previously coached for the team from 2006 to 2012 and 2014 to 2016.

===== 2024 season =====
Around the beginning of the 2024 season, North Dakota State was rumored to have had conversations with the Mountain West Conference, a conference that competes in the NCAA Division I Football Bowl Subdivision, about the Bison moving into the conference. However, those conversations seemingly went cold for the time being, as both sides would distance themselves from the conversation publicly. This wasn't the first time NDSU had been mentioned as a school that could make a move to the FBS, but it was certainly the most noise that had been heard on the topic up to this point.

On October 19, 2024, the Bison defeated the top-ranked, arch-rival, South Dakota State Jackrabbits to reclaim the Dakota Marker for the first time since 2019. This ended NDSU's losing streak to SDSU, as well as protected their Missouri Valley Football Conference league game winning streak record at 19.

On November 23, 2024, the Bison fell to fellow Dakota school, South Dakota, in consecutive regular seasons for the first time in the Division I era.

On December 21, 2024, North Dakota State defeated arch rival South Dakota State in the FCS semifinals to start their first winning streak over the Jacks since they strung three wins together in 2018 and 2019. They also clinched their 11th appearance in the NCAA Division I Football Championship Game.

On January 6, 2025, the Bison defeated Montana State, 35–32 to win their 10th FCS national championship and 18th national title at any level. Tim Polasek also continued a streak of three NDSU coaches in row to win the national championship in their first season coaching at North Dakota State.

===== 2025 season =====
On October 25, 2025, the Bison defeated arch-rival South Dakota State in a 38–7 rout to keep the Dakota Marker for the second season in a row, and match their longest streak in the series since 2019. It was also the largest win for either team in the series since 1992.

On November 8, 2025, North Dakota State defeated in-state rival North Dakota to claim their 7th outright Missouri Valley Football Conference title, and 12th overall title. It was also their first outright conference title since 2021.

On December 6, 2025, the Bison lost to Illinois State in the 2025 NCAA Division I Second Round to be eliminated from the playoffs. It was their earliest exit from the postseason in the Division I era. It was also their first loss at home since 2023, and only their second ever postseason loss in the Fargodome.

On February 6, 2026, reports emerged that North Dakota State and the Mountain West Conference were negotiating a football-only invitation to the conference in time for the start of the 2026 football season.

=== Division I-FBS (2026–present) ===
On February 9, 2026, North Dakota State announced they would be leaving for the Mountain West Conference of the NCAA Division I Football Bowl Subdivision effective July 1, 2026, and in time for the 2026 college football season.

==== 2026 season ====
North Dakota State's first intra-conference game as a member of the Mountain West on September 12, 2026

On June 24, 2026, the NCAA Division I cabinet enacted legislation recommended by the NCAA Division I Football Bowl Subdivision subcommittee that allowed all current and future programs reclassifying to the FBS to be immediately eligible for postseason events. This meant that the Bison would not have to wait until the end of the NCAA-mandated two year probation period to play in events such as bowl games, the Mountain West championship game, and the College Football Playoff. NDSU officially joined the Mountain West Conference on July 1, 2026.

On August 29, 2026, the Bison defeated Jacksonville State 33–7 at the Fargodome for their first win as a FBS program. Later, on September 12, 2026, NDSU defeated Air Force for their first conference win as a member of the Mountain West.

On September 28, 2026, North Dakota State and Wyoming announced the establishment of a new named rivalry series between the two football programs called the Battle of the Basins, featuring a new travelling trophy with both team's logos and crowned on top with a 10-inch oil drill bit. The trophy was inspired by the vibrant petroleum industry in both states, and is sponsored by the North Dakota Petroleum Council. Later that same week, the Bison would defeat the Cowboys in the first edition of the trophy series, 28–0.

On October 17, 2026, the Bison defeated Nevada to win their sixth game of the season and become bowl eligible for the first time in program history.

== Championships ==
=== National championships ===
North Dakota State have won eighteen national championships: three as a member of the College Division (precursor of Division II), five as a member of Division II, and ten as a member of Division I FCS. The Bison have been the runner-up four times (1967, 1981, 1984, and 2022) and have appeared in a total of twenty national championship games.

Year	Coach	Selector	Record	Score	Opponent
1965	Darrell Mudra	NCAA College Division by Polling	11–0	20–7	Grambling
1968	Ron Erhardt	NCAA College Division by Polling	10–0	23–14	Arkansas State
1969	Ron Erhardt	NCAA College Division by Polling	10–0	30–3	Montana
1983	Don Morton	NCAA Division II Playoffs	12–1	41–21	Central State (OH)
1985	Earle Solomonson	NCAA Division II Playoffs	11–2–1	35–7	North Alabama
1986	Earle Solomonson	NCAA Division II Playoffs	13–0	27–7	South Dakota
1988	Rocky Hager	NCAA Division II Playoffs	14–0	35–21	Portland State
1990	Rocky Hager	NCAA Division II Playoffs	14–0	51–11	IUP
2011	Craig Bohl	NCAA Division I (FCS) Playoffs	14–1	17–6	Sam Houston State
2012	Craig Bohl	NCAA Division I (FCS) Playoffs	14–1	39–13	Sam Houston State
2013	Craig Bohl	NCAA Division I (FCS) Playoffs	15–0	35–7	Towson
2014	Chris Klieman	NCAA Division I (FCS) Playoffs	15–1	29–27	Illinois State
2015	Chris Klieman	NCAA Division I (FCS) Playoffs	13–2	37–10	Jacksonville State
2017	Chris Klieman	NCAA Division I (FCS) Playoffs	14–1	17–13	James Madison
2018	Chris Klieman	NCAA Division I (FCS) Playoffs	15–0	38–24	Eastern Washington
2019	Matt Entz	NCAA Division I (FCS) Playoffs	16–0	28–20	James Madison
2021	Matt Entz	NCAA Division I (FCS) Playoffs	14–1	38–10	Montana State
2024	Tim Polasek	NCAA Division I (FCS) Playoffs	14–2	35–32	Montana State

=== Conference championships ===
North Dakota State has won 39 conference championships, 26 outright and 13 shared: North Central Conference (26), Great West (1), Missouri Valley (12)

Season	Conference	Overall Record	Conference Record	Coach
1925†	North Central Conference	13–8–2	4–0–2	Ion Cortright
1932	North Central Conference	7–1–1	4–0	Casey Finnegan
1935	North Central Conference	7–1–1	4–0–1	Casey Finnegan
1964†	North Central Conference	10–1	5–1	Darrell Mudra
1965	North Central Conference	11–0	6–0	Darrell Mudra
1966†	North Central Conference	8–2–0	5–1	Ron Erhardt
1967	North Central Conference	9–1	6–0	Ron Erhardt
1968	North Central Conference	10–0	6–0	Ron Erhardt
1969	North Central Conference	10–0	6–0	Ron Erhardt
1970	North Central Conference	9–0–1	6–0	Ron Erhardt
1972†	North Central Conference	8–2	6–1	Ron Erhardt
1973†	North Central Conference	8–2	6–1	Ev Kjelbertson
1974†	North Central Conference	7–4	5–2	Ev Kjelbertson
1976	North Central Conference	9–3	6–0	Jim Wacker
1977	North Central Conference	9–2–1	6–0	Jim Wacker
1981	North Central Conference	10–3	7–0	Don Morton
1982	North Central Conference	12–1	7–0	Don Morton
1983	North Central Conference	12–1	8–1	Don Morton
1984†	North Central Conference	11–2	8–1	Don Morton
1985	North Central Conference	11–2–1	7–1	Earle Solomonson
1986	North Central Conference	13–0	9–0	Earle Solomonson
1988	North Central Conference	14–0	9–0	Rocky Hager
1990	North Central Conference	14–0	9–0	Rocky Hager
1991	North Central Conference	7–3	7–1	Rocky Hager
1992	North Central Conference	10–2	8–1	Rocky Hager
1994†	North Central Conference	9–3	7–2	Rocky Hager
2006	Great West Conference	10–1	4–0	Craig Bohl
2011†	Missouri Valley Football Conference	14–1	7–1	Craig Bohl
2012	Missouri Valley Football Conference	14–1	7–1	Craig Bohl
2013	Missouri Valley Football Conference	15–0	8–0	Craig Bohl
2014†	Missouri Valley Football Conference	15–1	7–1	Chris Klieman
2015†	Missouri Valley Football Conference	13–2	7–1	Chris Klieman
2016†	Missouri Valley Football Conference	12–2	7–1	Chris Klieman
2017	Missouri Valley Football Conference	14–1	7–1	Chris Klieman
2018	Missouri Valley Football Conference	15–0	8–0	Chris Klieman
2019	Missouri Valley Football Conference	16–0	8–0	Matt Entz
2021	Missouri Valley Football Conference	14–1	7–1	Matt Entz
2024†	Missouri Valley Football Conference	14–2	7–1	Tim Polasek
2025	Missouri Valley Football Conference	12–1	8–0	Tim Polasek

† Co-champions

== Playoff history ==
=== Division I FCS ===
(2004–2025)

North Dakota State appeared in a total of 16 NCAA Division I Football Championship playoffs, all of which were consecutive. The Bison hold an overall record of 51–6 in postseason play since becoming eligible in 2008, including a record streak of 22 consecutive playoff wins from 2011 to 2016. The Bison have won more Division I FCS playoff games than any other program (past or present). NDSU has won 10 national championship games, lost 1 and have advanced to the quarterfinal round in every playoff they have appeared in except one. From 2011 to 2022, every playoff game NDSU had lost was to the eventual champion.

Year	Results	Opponents	Scores
2010	First Round; Second Round; Quarterfinals	Robert Morris; Montana State; Eastern Washington	W 43–17; W 42–17; L 31–38 ^{OT}
2011	Second Round; Quarterfinals; Semifinals; Champions	James Madison; Lehigh; Georgia Southern; Sam Houston State	W 26–14; W 24–0; W 35–7; W 17–6
2012	Second Round; Quarterfinals; Semifinals; Champions	South Dakota State; Wofford; Georgia Southern; Sam Houston State	W 28–3; W 14–7; W 23–20; W 39–13
2013	Second Round; Quarterfinals; Semifinals; Champions	Furman; Coastal Carolina; New Hampshire; Towson	W 38–7; W 48–14; W 52–14; W 35–7
2014	Second Round; Quarterfinals; Semifinals; Champions	South Dakota State; Coastal Carolina; Sam Houston State; Illinois State	W 27–24; W 39–32; W 35–3; W 29–27
2015	Second Round; Quarterfinals; Semifinals; Champions	Montana; Northern Iowa; Richmond; Jacksonville State	W 37–6; W 23–13; W 33–7; W 37–10
2016	Second Round; Quarterfinals; Semifinals	San Diego; South Dakota State; James Madison	W 45–7; W 36–10; L 17–27
2017	Second Round; Quarterfinals; Semifinals; Champions	San Diego; Wofford; Sam Houston State; James Madison	W 38–3; W 42–10; W 55–13; W 17–13
2018	Second Round; Quarterfinals; Semifinals; Champions	Montana State; Colgate; South Dakota State; Eastern Washington	W 52–10; W 35–0; W 44–21; W 38–24
2019	Second Round; Quarterfinals; Semifinals; Champions	Nicholls; Illinois State; Montana State; James Madison	W 37–13; W 9–3; W 42–14; W 28–20
2020	First Round; Quarterfinals	Eastern Washington; Sam Houston State	W 42–20; L 20–24
2021	Second Round; Quarterfinals; Semifinals; Champions	Southern Illinois; East Tennessee State; James Madison; Montana State	W 38–7; W 27–3; W 20–14; W 38–10
2022	Second Round; Quarterfinals; Semifinals; Runner-Up	Montana; Samford; Incarnate Word; South Dakota State	W 49–26; W 27–9; W 35–32; L 21–45
2023	First Round; Second Round; Quarterfinals; Semifinals	Drake; Montana State; South Dakota; Montana	W 66–3; W 35–34 ^{OT} W 45–17; L 29–31 ^{2OT}
2024	Second Round; Quarterfinals; Semifinals; Champions	Abilene Christian; Mercer; South Dakota State; Montana State	W 51–31; W 31–7; W 28–21; W 35–32
2025	Second Round	Illinois State	L 28–29

=== Division II ===
(1964–2003)

North Dakota State appeared in 23 NCAA Division II playoffs from 1964 to 2003. During this stretch, NDSU compiled a 347–94–4 record, winning almost 80% of their games for four decades and claiming eight championships along the way. NDSU appeared in seven out of ten championship games from 1981 to 1990; including appearing in four straight championship games, an unrivaled number in D-II as they posted a 111–16–2 (.875) mark from 1981 to 1990. While this is a startling record, from 1964 to 1973 the Bison went 90–12–1 (.887) which included a 35-game unbeaten streak.

Year	Result	Game	Opponent	Score	References
College Division (rankings via AP writers poll)
1964	unranked	Mineral Water Bowl	Western State (CO)	W 14–13
1965	AP No. 1	Pecan Bowl	Grambling	W 20–7
1967	AP No. 2	Pecan Bowl	UT Arlington	L 10–13
1968	AP No. 1	Pecan Bowl	Arkansas State	W 23–14
1969	AP No. 1	Camellia Bowl	Montana	W 30–3
1970	AP No. 3	Camellia Bowl	Montana	W 31–16
Division II (postseason playoffs with 8-team bracket)
1976	3rd Place	First round Grantland Rice Bowl	Eastern Kentucky; Montana State	W 10–7; L 3–10
1977	3rd Place	First round Grantland Rice Bowl	Northern Michigan; Jacksonville State	W 20–6; L 7–31
1981	Runner Up	First round Semifinals; Championship	Puget Sound; Shippensburg; Southwest Texas State	W 24–10; W 18–6; L 13–42
1982	3rd Place	First round Semifinals	Virginia Union; UC Davis	W 21–20; L 14–19
1983	Champions	First round Semifinals; Championship	Towson State; UC Davis; Central State (OH)	W 24–17; W 26–17; W 41–21
1984	Runner Up*	First round Semifinals; Championship	UC Davis; Nebraska–Omaha; Troy State	W 31–25; W 25–14; L 17–18
1985	Champions	First round Semifinals; Championship	UC Davis; South Dakota; North Alabama	W 31–12; W 16–7; W 35–7
1986	Champions	First round Semifinals; Championship	Ashland; Central State (OH); South Dakota	W 50–0; W 35–12; W 27–7
Division II (postseason playoffs with 16-team bracket)
1988	Champions	First round Quarterfinals; Semifinals; Championship	Augustana (SD); Millersville; Sacramento State; Portland State	W 41–7; W 36–26; W 42–20; W 35–21
1989		First round Quarterfinals	Edinboro; Jacksonville State	W 45–32; L 17–21
1990	Champions	First round Quarterfinals; Semifinals; Championship	Northern Colorado; Cal Poly; Pittsburg State; IUP	W 17–7; W 47–0; W 39–29; W 51–11
1991		First round	Mankato State	L 7–27
1992		First round Quarterfinals	Northeast Missouri State; Pittsburg State	W 42–7; L 37–38 ^{OT}
1994		First round Quarterfinals	Pittsburg State; North Dakota	W 18–12 ^{3OT} L 7–14
1995		First round Quarterfinals	North Dakota; Pittsburg State	W 41–10; L 7–9
1997		First round	Northwest Missouri State	L 28–39
2000		First round Quarterfinals; Semifinals	No. 1 Northwest Missouri State; No. 5 Nebraska–Omaha; No. 11 Delta State	W 31–17; W 43–21; L 16–34
Totals	(.729)			1,238 - 762

- At the end of the 1984, championship game NDSU took the lead on a field goal making it 17–15 with 1:36 left; after being on the Troy State 2-yard line and settling for 3 points. Troy State subsequently drove down the field with no timeouts to the Bison's 33 yard line with 15 seconds remaining. With apparent confusion on the field, Troy State (known since 2005 as Troy) rushed the field goal team out on the field and freshman kicker Ted Clem kicked the longest field goal in Troy history at 50 yards as time expired to give the Trojans the victory.

== Rivalries ==
=== Northern Iowa ===
The Bison are 25–16 against Northern Iowa (UNI) all time. Both Chris Klieman and Matt Entz spent time on the UNI defensive staff before getting hired away to NDSU. Kleiman, in particular, played football at Northern Iowa and spent two separate stints on the Panther coaching staff. The two schools played every season from 1954 to 1979 as members of the North Central Conference. The schools were reunited in 2008 when NDSU moved to the Missouri Valley Football Conference. Northern Iowa won the first three battles, with the 2009 edition marked by a sideline fight between the two sides.

In the early 2010s, North Dakota State–UNI was regularly one of the highest-profile games of the season, and the two considered each other to be top rivals. In 2011, the #3 ranked Bison hosted #2 UNI in front of a near-capacity crowd of 18,886. The Bison won the matchup, 27–19, in a game sometimes regarded as the start of the NDSU dynasty. Two seasons later, NDSU would again host UNI in a top-five matchup. The Herd won the game by a narrow margin of 24–23, by far the closest matchup of the 2013 season. The following year, the Panthers would be the team to end NDSU's record-breaking 33-game winning streak, thoroughly thrashing the three-time defending champions 23–3.

The 2015 edition of the rivalry was one of the most interesting in the series, and is considered one of the greatest games in NDSU history. The game was announced as homecoming before the season, and the day started with SportsCenter's "On the Road Show" broadcasting live from the Fargodome. The #3 Bison trailed nearly all game before Carson Wentz hit future Green Bay Packers receiver Darrius Shepherd (who didn't play most of the first half due to injury) in the endzone for the game-winning touchdown with less than a minute remaining. The rivalry has cooled, as the Bison have won 10 straight in the series. Since 2016, just one contest has been decided by less than 14 points. With NDSU's move to the FBS and the Mountain West - the rivalry has effectively been paused.

== Head coaches ==
Tim Polasek is the 32nd and current head coach of the Bison, and he took over after the team lost to Montana in the semifinals of the 2023 FCS playoffs. He succeeded Matt Entz, who was named to the open Linebackers/Assistant Coach position at USC. Entz concluded his five seasons as head coach (2019–2023) with a 60–11 record and two FCS national championships, as well as two MVFC titles. Craig Bohl holds the record for most wins in school history with 104 in his 11-year career, averaging over 9.5 wins per season. Ron Erhardt holds the record for most conference titles won with 6, followed by Rocky Hager and Chris Klieman with 5 each.

#	Coach	Years active	Record	Conference titles	National championships
1	Henry Luke Bolley	1894–1899	7–8–1	No affiliation	
2	Jack Harrison	1900–1901	15–1–1	No affiliation	
3	Eddie Cochems	1902–1903	9–1–0	No affiliation	
4	A. L. Marshall	1904–1905	4–7–1	No affiliation	
5	Gil Dobie	1906–1907	7–0–0	No affiliation	
6	Paul Magoffin	1908	2–3–0	No affiliation	
7	Arthur Rueber	1909–1912	12–7–1	No affiliation	
8	Howard Wood	1913–1914	5–5–2	No affiliation	
9	Paul J. Davis	1915–1917	10–7–1	No affiliation	
10	Stanley Borleske	1919–1921, 1923–1924, 1928	17–14–4		
11	Joe Cutting	1922	6–2–0		
12	Ion Cortright	1925–1927	13–8–2	1925	
13	Casey Finnegan	1928–1940	57–49–11	1932, 1935	
14	Stan Kostka	1941, 1946–1947	8–17–0		
15	Robert A. Lowe	1942–1945	3–9–2		
16	Howard Bliss	1948–1949	3–16–0		
17	Mac Wenskunas	1950–1953	11–21–1		
18	Del Anderson	1954–1955	1–16–1		
19	Les Luymes	1956	5–4–0		
20	Bob Danielson	1957–1962	13–39–2		
21	Darrell Mudra	1963–1965	24–6–0	1964, 1965	1965
22	Ron Erhardt	1966–1972	61–7–1	1966, 1967, 1968, 1969, 1970, 1972	1968, 1969
23	Ev Kjelbertson	1973–1975	17–13–0	1973, 1974	
24	Jim Wacker	1976–1978	24–9–1	1976, 1977	
25	Don Morton	1979–1984	57–15–0	1981, 1982, 1983, 1984	1983
26	Earle Solomonson	1985–1986	24–2–1	1985, 1986	1985, 1986
27	Rocky Hager	1987–1996	91–25–1	1988, 1990, 1991, 1992, 1994	1988, 1990
28	Bob Babich	1997–2002	46–22		
29	Craig Bohl	2003–2013	104–32	2006, 2011, 2012, 2013	2011, 2012, 2013
30	Chris Klieman	2014–2018	69–6	2014, 2015, 2016, 2017, 2018	2014, 2015, 2017, 2018
31	Matt Entz	2019–2023	60–11	2019, 2021	2019, 2021
32	Tim Polasek	2024–present	26–3	2024, 2025	2024

== Facilities ==
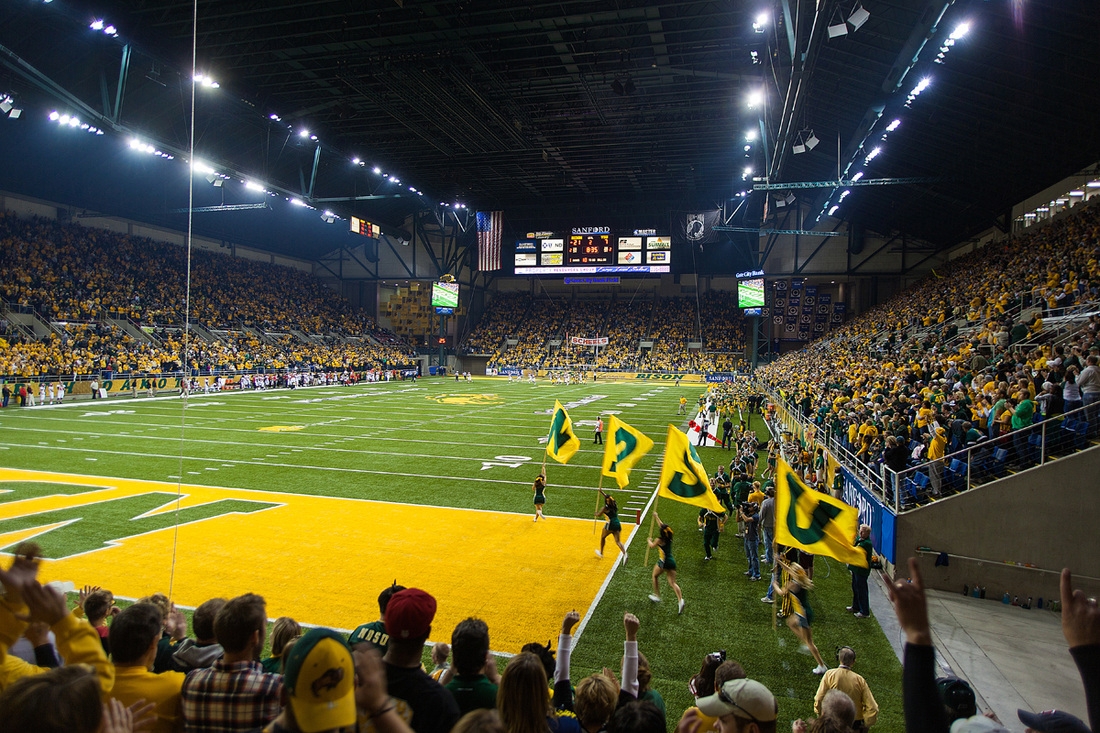
The Fargodome during a North Dakota State Bison Football Game

The Bison have played in the Fargodome since it opened in 1993. In 2012, Gate City Bank Field was installed, advancing the playing surface. It holds 18,700 for football games and over 19,000 including standing room only tickets, making it the largest stadium in Fargo. The record attendance at the Fargodome is 19,108, when the Bison played Missouri State on October 12, 2013. The Bison have only lost two playoff games in the history of the Fargodome. The tremendous crowd noise caused by the Fargodome's steel roof disrupts many opposing offenses and creates one of the best home field advantages in college football.

Football records in the Fargodome

- Playoffs: 38–2 (.950)
- Home openers: 33–1 (.971)
- Overall record: 211–30 (.876)
- Record attendance: 19,108 on October 12, 2013, vs. Missouri State

In 2011, the Fargodome was ranked as the 49th-best stadium in all of college football. The article cites, "There aren't many indoor venues in college football, but the few that do exist at the non-FBS level are very unfriendly to any visiting team. That effect is only amplified in a playoff atmosphere." The Fargodome is routinely ranked as one of the loudest college football stadiums in the country. In 2016, Stadium Journey ranked the Fargodome as the #2 Best FCS stadium to experience a game in On December 10, 2011, in a game against Lehigh, the crowd noise was measured at 111 decibels, comparable to when the New Orleans Saints play in the Superdome. During the 2011 playoffs, the decibel level spiked past 130 decibels several times but was not an official measurement. On December 14, 2012, in an FCS semifinal game against Georgia Southern, the crowd noise exceeded the 115-decibel mark and was known to be one of the loudest games in NDSU history. The Forum of Fargo-Moorhead conducted an informal study of Fargodome crowd noise from the press box during a playoff semifinal game, December 2013. The readings showed a high of 111 decibels following a late touchdown by quarterback Brock Jensen. The decibel meter consistently read 102–106 throughout that game, according to The Forum. NDSU to study decibel levels at playoff football game During the 2013 Furman playoff game, the crowd noise was measured at 115 decibels. During the 2015 playoffs against Montana, the crowd noise measured 120 decibels, and the Bison beat the Grizzlies 37–6, avenging their season-opening loss in Missoula. The record for the loudest indoor stadium crowd was set in 2013 at the Sacramento Kings' former home of Sleep Train Arena at 126 decibels. Due to the notorious noise, the Fargodome is sometimes referred to as the "Thunderdome". An example of this loudness can be found when the Bison offense advances the ball and gets a "first down". The announcer says over the loud speaker, "With that carry/pass, thats another Bison", in which the crowd loudly responds in unison "FIRST DOWN...AH MOVE THE CHAINS". Although an announcer declaring a "first down" is not unique to the Fargodome, the audience's response along with the prompt to move the chains is fairly unique to the Fargodome. This tradition was started back in the days when the team played in Dacotah Field. The crowd would do the traditional chant after every Bison first down and it was carried over to the FargoDome when the team played its first game in the new facility.

Prior to the Fargodome, the team played at Dacotah Field from 1910 to 1992, an outdoor stadium dealing with the very harsh winters in Fargo.

== Records and streaks ==
=== FCS records ===
- 39 consecutive wins (2017–2021)
- 30 straight weeks at No. 1 in the FCS Coaches Poll (2012–2014)
- 20 straight weeks at No. 1 in the STATS Poll (2012–2013) (30 weeks at #1 out of 31)

=== FCS top 25 streaks ===
- 217 straight weeks in the STATS Poll (2011–2025)
- 173 straight weeks in the top 10 of the STATS Poll (2011–2023)

=== Winning streaks ===
Only streaks of 10 or more games are highlighted.

Rank	Streak	Date	Spoiler
1	39*	2017–2020	Southern Illinois 38, 1 North Dakota State 14
2	33	2012–2014	19 Northern Iowa 23, 1 North Dakota State 3
3	24	1964–1966	San Diego State 36, North Dakota State 0
4	21	1987–1989	St Cloud State 20, North Dakota State 13
5	20	1968–1970**	North Dakota State 14, Eastern Michigan 14 (TIE)
6	19	1985–1987	Northern Michigan 10, North Dakota State 6
7	17	1900–1903	Minnesota JV 11, North Dakota State 0
8	16	2024–2025	17т Illinois State 29, North Dakota State 28
9	14	2015–2016	11 South Dakota State 19, 1 North Dakota State 17
9	14	2006–2007	South Dakota State 29, North Dakota State 24
9	14	1990–1991	Grand Valley State 21, North Dakota State 17
9	14	1970–1971**	North Dakota 23, North Dakota State 7
10	12	1982	UC Davis 19, North Dakota State 14
11	10	2024	4 South Dakota 29, 3 North Dakota State 28
11	10	2011–2012	Indiana State 17, 1 North Dakota State 14
11	10	1984	Troy 18, North Dakota State 17
11	10	1983–1984	MN St Mankato 28, North Dakota State 21
11	10	1981	Texas State 42, North Dakota State 13

* FCS Record
** The tie broke the winning streak of 20 games, but was part of a larger un-beaten streak of 34 games between 1968 and 1971, with another 14 game win streak after the tie game.

== Games against the FBS ==
The Bison held a record of 9–5 against FBS schools since they moved up from Division II to Division I FCS in 2004 until they moved from FCS to FBS in 2026, including a winning streak of 6 games from 2010 to 2016. The following table lists all of the games North Dakota State has played against a Football Bowl Subdivision (FBS) school since they began reclassification to become a FCS school until they left FCS in 2026.

Season	Game Date	Location	Opponent	Conference	Result	Reference
2006	September 23, 2006	Sheumann Stadium Muncie, IN	Ball State	Mid -American	W 29-24	
2006	October 21, 2006	Metrodome; Minneapolis, MN	Minnesota	Big Ten	L 9–10	
2007	September 22, 2007	Kelly/Shorts Stadium Mount Pleasant, MI	Central Michigan	Mid -American	W 44-14	
2007	October 20, 2007	Metrodome; Minneapolis, MN	Minnesota	Big Ten	W 27–21	
2008	September 13, 2008	War Memorial Stadium; Laramie, WY	Wyoming	Mountain West	L 13–16	
2009	September 3, 2009	Jack Trice Stadium; Ames, IA	Iowa State	Big 12	L 17–34	
2010	September 4, 2010	David Booth Kansas Memorial Stadium; Lawrence, KS	Kansas	Big 12	W 6–3	
2011	September 24, 2011	TCF Bank Stadium; Minneapolis, MN	Minnesota	Big Ten	W 37–24	
2012	September 8, 2012	Hughes Stadium; Fort Collins, CO	Colorado State	Mountain West	W 22–7	
2013	August 30, 2013	Bill Snyder Family Football Stadium; Manhattan, KS	Kansas State	Big 12	W 24–21	
2014	August 30, 2014	Jack Trice Stadium; Ames, IA	Iowa State	Big 12	W 34–14	
2016	September 17, 2016	Kinnick Stadium; Iowa City, IA	Iowa	Big Ten	W 23–21	
2022	September 17, 2022	Arizona Stadium; Tucson, AZ	Arizona	Pac-12	L 28–31	
2024	August 29, 2024	Folsom Field; Boulder, CO	Colorado	Big 12	L 26–31	

== All-Americans ==
The list below covers North Dakota State All-Americans since the 2004 season when the program joined the FCS. This list uses six total selectors, the Associated Press (AP), STATS FCS (once they began coverage in 2015), HERO sports (once they began coverage in 2016 and stopped in 2023), TSN (who began FCS coverage in 2006 and stopped in 2014), the American Football Coaches Association (AFCA), and the Athletic Directors Association (ADA).

This list is in progress.

Year	Player	Position	First team	Second team	Third team
2013	Colton Heagle	SS	—	—	AP
2013	Marcus Williams	CB	CONSENSUS	—	—
2013	Brock Jensen	QB	—	—	AP
2013	Grant Olson	LB	—	—	AP
2013	Ryan Drevlow	DT	—	AP	—
2013	Billy Turner	OT	CONSENSUS	—	—
2014	Colton Heagle	SS	AP, AFCA	TSN	—
2014	Ben LeCompte	P	—	TSN	—
2014	Adam Keller	K	—	—	AP
2014	Kyle Emanuel	DE	CONSENSUS	—	—
2014	John Crockett	RB	—	TSN	—
2014	Andrew Bonnet	FB	—	—	TSN
2014	Joe Haeg	OL	CONSENSUS	—	—
2015	Greg Menard	DE	—	—	STATS
2015	Ben LeCompte	P	STATS	AP	—
2015	Joe Haeg	OL	AP, STATS	—	—
2015	Andrew Bonnet	FB	—	STATS	—
2015	Zack W. Johnson	G	—	—	AP
2016	Greg Menard	DL	—	HERO	AP
2016	MJ Stumpf	LB	—	—	HERO
2016	Chase Morlock	FB	—	—	STATS
2016	James Fisher	LS	—	STATS	—
2016	Tre Dempsey	DB	AFCA	STATS, HERO	—
2016	Landon Lechler	OL	AP	—	—
2016	Zack Johnson	OL	CONSENSUS	—	—
2017	Robbie Grimsley	DB	—	STATS	—
2017	James Fisher	LS	STATS	—	—
2017	Nick DeLuca	LB	CONSENSUS	—	—
2017	Bruce Anderson	RB	—	HERO	—
2017	Tre Dempsey	FS	AFCA	HERO	—
2017	Austin Kuhnhart	G	CONSENSUS	—	—
2018	Darrius Shepherd	RS	—	—	STATS
2018	Garret Wegner	P	—	—	AP, STATS
2018	Zack Johnson	OT	—	STATS, HERO	AP
2018	Jabril Cox	LB	HERO	AP, STATS	—
2018	Greg Menard	DL	AFCA	AP	STATS
2018	Robbie Grimsley	DB	AP, STATS	HERO	—
2018	Tanner Volson	C	CONSENSUS	—	—
2018	Easton Stick	QB	AP, HERO	AFCA	STATS
2019	Dillon Radunz	OT	CONSENSUS		
2019	Derrek Tuszka	DE	AP, HERO, STATS	AFCA	
2019	Zack Johnson	G	HERO	AP	STATS
2019	Trey Lance	QB	HERO, STATS	AFCA, AP	
2019	Jabril Cox	LB	HERO	STATS	AP
2019	Cordell Volson	OT		HERO	
2019	James Hendricks	S		HERO	
2019	Ben Ellefson	TE		AFCA	HERO, STATS
2020^	Christian Watson	WR/KR	AP, STATS, HERO	—	—
2020^	Cordell Volson	OL	AP, STATS, HERO	—	—
2020^	Garrett Wegner	P	AP, STATS, HERO	—	—
2020^	Hunter Luepke	FB	STATS	—	—
2020^	James Kazcor	LB	—	AFCA, STATS	—
2020^	Ross Kennelly	LS	—	STATS	—
2020^	Spencer Waege	DL	—	AFCA	—
2021	Brayden Thomas	DL	—	—	AP, HERO
2021	Christian Watson	WR	HERO	AP, STATS	—
2021	Cody Mauch	OL	—	AP	HERO
2021	Cordell Volson	OL	CONSENSUS	—	—
2021	Hunter Luepke	FB	STATS, HERO	—	—
2021	Jayden Price	KR	—	—	STATS
2021	Michael Tutsie	DB	HERO	—	STATS
2021	Noah Gindorff	TE	—	—	HERO
2022	Cody Mauch	OL	CONSENSUS	—	—
2022	Hunter Luepke	FB	STATS, HERO	AP	—
2022	Michael Tutsie	DB	—	AFCA	AP
2022	Nash Jensen	OL	AP	AFCA, STATS	—
2022	Spencer Waege	DE	AP, STATS, HERO	AFCA	—
2023	Cam Miller	QB	—	STATS	—
2023	Cole Wisniewski	DB	AP, AFCA, STATS, ADA	—	—
2023	Hunter Brozio	LS	AFCA	STATS	—
2023	Jake Kubas	OL	STATS	—	AP
2023	Jalen Sundell	OL	AFCA	—	STATS
2024	Cam Miller	QB	STATS	AP, AFCA	—
2024	Eli Mostaert	DL	STATS	AP, STATS	—
2024	Grey Zabel	OL	CONSENSUS	—	—
2024	Mason Miller	OL	AP	—	—
2025	Bryce Lance	WR	CONSENSUS	—	—
2025	Cole Payton	QB	STATS	AP	—
2025	Eli Ozick	PK	—	AP, STATS	—
2025	Griffin Empey	OL	AP	AFCA	STATS
2025	Logan Kopp	LB	AFCA	AP, STATS	—
2025	Trent Fraley	OL	CONSENSUS	—	—
2025	Key: * First team; ^{†} Second team; ^{‡} Third team. For expansions of abbreviations see the glossary. ^-Played in Spring 2021				

== Bison in the NFL ==
First round draft picks

Name	Position	Year	Overall pick	Team
Carson Wentz	QB	2016	2	Philadelphia Eagles
Trey Lance	QB	2021	3	San Francisco 49ers
Grey Zabel	OT	2025	18	Seattle Seahawks

=== Active NFL ===
As of August 2026

- Jake Kubas, New York Giants
- Trey Lance, Los Angeles Chargers
- Bryce Lance, New Orleans Saints
- Hunter Luepke, Dallas Cowboys
- Cody Mauch, Tampa Bay Buccaneers
- Barika Kpeenu, Tampa Bay Buccaneers
- Cam Miller, Miami Dolphins
- Mason Miller, Detroit Lions
- Cole Payton, Philadelphia Eagles
- Jayden Price, New Orleans Saints
- Dillon Radunz, New Orleans Saints
- Jalen Sundell, Seattle Seahawks
- Cordell Volson, Green Bay Packers
- Christian Watson, Green Bay Packers
- Carson Wentz, Minnesota Vikings
- Grey Zabel, Seattle Seahawks

== Future non-conference opponents ==
The Mountain West plays 8 conference games, which leaves 4 games for non-conference opponents. When Hawaii is on the schedule, a team is allowed to play in Week 0 or play 13 games.

2026	2027	2028	2029
vs Jacksonville State (CUSA - FBS)	vs Montana State (Big Sky - FCS) at Allegiant Stadium in Las Vegas, Nevada	at Oregon (Big Ten - FBS, Rescheduled from 2020)	at Jacksonville State (CUSA - FBS)
vs Fordham (Patriot League - FCS)	vs Sacramento State (MAC - FBS)		
at Sacramento State (MAC - FBS)			
at San Jose State (Mountain West - FBS) (Note: Even though NDSU and SJSU are MW opponents, they will play as non-conference opponents in 2026)			
