= 1985 Cal State Northridge Matadors football team =

American college football season

1985 Cal State Northridge Matadors football
- Conference: Western Football Conference
- Record: 4–7 (1–4 WFC)
- Head coach: Tom Keele (7th season)
- Defensive coordinator: Mark Banker (3rd season)
- Home stadium: North Campus Stadium

1985 Western Football Conference standings
	Conf.					Overall
Team	W		L		T	W		L		T
No. 15 Santa Clara $	4	–	0	–	1	8	–	2	–	1
No. 19 Sacramento State	4	–	1	–	0	8	–	3	–	0
Portland State	2	–	2	–	1	4	–	5	–	1
Cal Poly	2	–	3	–	0	4	–	7	–	0
Cal Lutheran	1	–	4	–	0	6	–	5	–	0
Cal State Northridge	1	–	4	–	0	4	–	7	–	0
$ – Conference champion; Rankings from NCAA Division II Football Committee poll

The 1985 Cal State Northridge Matadors football team represented California State University, Northridge as a member of the Western Football Conference (WFC) during the 1985 NCAA Division II football season. Led by Tom Keele in his seventh and final season as head coach, Cal State Northridge compiled an overall record of 4–7 with a mark of 1–4 in conference play, tying for fifth place in the WFC. The team was outscored by its opponents 339 to 281 for the season. The Matadors played home games at North Campus Stadium in Northridge, California.

== Schedule ==
Date	Opponent	Site	Result	Attendance	Source
September 7	at Nevada*	Mackay Stadium; Reno, NV	L 12–56	9,481	
September 21	at Saint Mary's*	Saint Mary's Stadium; Moraga, CA	W 45–13	2,258	
September 28	San Francisco State*	North Campus Stadium; Northridge, CA	W 41–17	2,741	
October 5	at No. 6 Cal State Hayward*	Pioneer Stadium; Hayward, CA	L 20–25	1,200–2,300	
October 12	Sonoma State*	North Campus Stadium; Northridge, CA	W 40–14	1,844	
October 19	Cal Lutheran	North Campus Stadium; Northridge, CA	W 27–23	3,859	
October 26	Cal Poly	North Campus Stadium; Northridge, CA	L 21–34	5,335	
November 2	at No. 2 UC Davis*	Toomey Field; Davis, CA	L 22–41	7,250–7,850	
November 9	No. 6 Santa Clara	North Campus Stadium; Northridge, CA	L 19–21	2,728	
November 16	at No. 13 Sacramento State	Hornet Stadium; Sacramento, CA	L 10–34	3,108–3,500	
November 23	at Portland State	Civic Stadium; Portland, OR	L 24–61	1,513	
*Non-conference game; Rankings from NCAA Division II Football Committee Poll released prior to the game

== Team players in the NFL ==
No Cal State Northridge players were selected in the 1986 NFL draft.

The following finished their college career in 1985 were not drafted, but played in the NFL.

Player	Position	First NFL team
Ron Foster	Defensive back	1987 Los Angeles Raiders
