= 1985 San Francisco State Gators football team =

American college football season

1985 San Francisco State Gators football
- Conference: Northern California Athletic Conference
- Record: 3–6–1 (2–3 NCAC)
- Head coach: Vic Rowen (25th season)
- Home stadium: Cox Stadium

1985 Northern California Athletic Conference football standings
	Conf.					Overall
Team	W		L		T	W		L		T
No. 1 UC Davis $^	5	–	0	–	0	9	–	2	–	0
Chico State	3	–	1	–	1	4	–	4	–	1
Cal State Hayward	2	–	2	–	1	6	–	3	–	1
San Francisco State	2	–	3	–	0	3	–	6	–	1
Sonoma State	1	–	4	–	0	3	–	7	–	0
Humboldt State	1	–	4	–	0	2	–	8	–	0
$ – Conference champion; ^ – NCAA Division II playoff participant; Rankings from NCAA Division II Football Committee poll

The 1985 San Francisco State Gators football team represented San Francisco State University as a member of the Northern California Athletic Conference (NCAC) during the 1985 NCAA Division II football season. Led by 25th-year head coach Vic Rowen, San Francisco State compiled an overall record of 3–6–1 with a mark of 2–3 in conference play, placing fourth in the NCAC. For the season the team was outscored by its opponents 347 to 252. The Gators played home games at Cox Stadium in San Francisco.

== Schedule ==
Date	Opponent	Site	Result	Attendance	Source
September 21	at Cal Lutheran*	Mt. Clef Field; Thousand Oaks, CA	L 24–28	2,000	
September 28	at Cal State Northridge*	North Campus Stadium; Northridge, CA	L 17–41	2,741	
October 5	Saint Mary's*	Cox Stadium; San Francisco, CA	W 41–10	1,500	
October 12	Cal State Hayward	Cox Stadium; San Francisco, CA	W 34–24	800–2,100	
October 19	Sonoma State	Cox Stadium; San Francisco, CA	W 35–26	943–1,300	
October 26	at No. 3 UC Davis	Toomey Field; Davis, CA	L 12–65	7,750	
November 2	Santa Clara*	Cox Stadium; San Francisco, CA	L 30–53	2,000	
November 9	at Azusa Pacific*	Azusa, CA	T 38–38		
November 16	Chico State	Cox Stadium; San Francisco, CA	L 7–34	1,482	
November 23	at Humboldt State	Redwood Bowl; Arcata, CA	L 14–28	1,032	
*Non-conference game; Rankings from NCAA Division II Football Committee Poll released prior to the game
