= 1985 Hampton Pirates football team =

American college football season

1985 Hampton Pirates football

Black college national champion CIAA champion

CIAA Championship Game, W 13–7 vs. Winston-Salem State

NCAA Division II First Round, L 28–38 vs. Bloomsburg
- Conference: Central Intercollegiate Athletic Association
- Northern Division
- Record: 10–2 (6–1 CIAA)
- Head coach: Fred Freeman (1st season)
- Home stadium: Armstrong Stadium

1985 Central Intercollegiate Athletic Association football standings
	Conf.					Overall
Team	W		L		T	W		L		T
Northern Division
No. 8 Hampton xy$^	6	–	1	–	0	10	–	2	–	0
Norfolk State	5	–	2	–	0	6	–	4	–	0
Elizabeth City State	4	–	3	–	0	6	–	4	–	0
Virginia Union	4	–	3	–	0	6	–	4	–	0
Virginia State	3	–	3	–	1	4	–	5	–	1
Saint Paul's (VA)	0	–	7	–	0	2	–	8	–	0
Southern Division
No. 18 Winston-Salem State xy	7	–	1	–	0	9	–	2	–	0
Livingstone	5	–	2	–	0	7	–	3	–	0
North Carolina Central	4	–	4	–	0	4	–	6	–	0
Fayetteville State	3	–	3	–	1	4	–	5	–	1
Johnson C. Smith	1	–	6	–	0	1	–	9	–	0
Bowie State	0	–	7	–	0	0	–	10	–	0
Championship: Hampton 13, Winston-Salem State 7
$ – Conference champion; x – Division champion/co-champions; y – Championship game participant; ^ – NCAA Division II playoff participant; Rankings from NCAA Division II Football Committee poll

The 1985 Hampton Pirates football team represented Hampton University as a member of the Central Intercollegiate Athletic Association (CIAA) during the 1985 NCAA Division II football season. Led by first-year head coach Fred Freeman, the Pirates compiled an overall record of 10–2 and a mark of 6–1 in conference play, and finished as CIAA champion after they defeated Winston-Salem State in the first CIAA Championship Game. Hampton finished their season with a loss against Bloomsburg in the Division II playoffs. At the conclusion of the season, the Pirates were also recognized as black college national champion.

== Schedule ==
Date	Opponent	Rank	Site	Result	Attendance	Source
September 7	at Johnson C. Smith		American Legion Memorial Stadium; Charlotte, NC	W 10–6	2,500	
September 14	at Cheyney*		Temple Stadium; Philadelphia, PA (Wade Wilson Classic)	W 31–7	12,500	
September 21	Virginia Union		Armstrong Stadium; Hampton, VA	W 31–0	6,221	
September 28	Winston-Salem State	No. 15	Armstrong Stadium; Hampton, VA	L 13–47	4,800	
October 5	Bowie State		Armstrong Stadium; Hampton, VA	W 40–0	2,262	
October 12	Elizabeth City State		Armstrong Stadium; Hampton, VA	W 25–6	3,949	
October 19	at Norfolk State		Foreman Field; Norfolk, VA (rivalry)	W 36–35	30,307	
October 26	at District of Columbia*	No. 17	Cardozo H.S. Stadium; Washington, DC	W 34–6	1,937	
November 9	Saint Paul's (VA)^{†}	No. 16	Armstrong Stadium; Hampton, VA	W 15–3	10,453	
November 16	Virginia State	No. 18	Armstrong Stadium; Hampton, VA	W 23–0	3,113	
November 23	at No. 8 Winston-Salem State	No. 16	Bowman Gray Stadium; Winston-Salem, NC (CIAA Championship Game)	W 13–7	5,138	
November 30	at No. 3 Bloomsburg*	No. 8	Robert B. Redman Stadium; Bloomsburg, PA (NCAA Division II First Round)	L 28–38		
*Non-conference game; ^{†}Homecoming; Rankings from NCAA Division II Football Committee Poll released prior to the game
