= 1985 Sonoma State Cossacks football team =

American college football season

1985 Sonoma State Cossacks football
- Conference: Northern California Athletic Conference
- Record: 3–7 (1–4 NCAC)
- Head coach: Tony Kehl (4th season)
- Home stadium: Cossacks Stadium

1985 Northern California Athletic Conference football standings
	Conf.					Overall
Team	W		L		T	W		L		T
No. 1 UC Davis $^	5	–	0	–	0	9	–	2	–	0
Chico State	3	–	1	–	1	4	–	4	–	1
Cal State Hayward	2	–	2	–	1	6	–	3	–	1
San Francisco State	2	–	3	–	0	3	–	6	–	1
Sonoma State	1	–	4	–	0	3	–	7	–	0
Humboldt State	1	–	4	–	0	2	–	8	–	0
$ – Conference champion; ^ – NCAA Division II playoff participant; Rankings from NCAA Division II Football Committee poll

The 1985 Sonoma State Cossacks football team represented Sonoma State University as a member of the Northern California Athletic Conference (NCAC) during the 1985 NCAA Division II football season. Led by fourth-year head coach Tony Kehl, Sonoma State compiled an overall record of 3–7 with a mark of 1–4 in conference play, tying for fifth place in the NCAC. The team was outscored by its opponents 301 to 153 for the season. The Cossacks played home games at Cossacks Stadium (Note: Cossacks Stadium was renamed in 2002 to Seawolf Stadium when the University changed the name of the mascot to Seawolves.) in Rohnert Park, California.

== Schedule ==
Date	Opponent	Site	Result	Attendance	Source
September 14	Cal Lutheran*	Cossacks Stadium; Rohnert Park, CA	L 7–28	1,264–1,284	
September 21	Sacramento State*	Cossacks Stadium; Rohnert Park, CA	L 10–63	842–861	
September 28	Redlands*	Cossacks Stadium; Rohnert Park, CA	W 23–0	712	
October 5	Chico State	Cossacks Stadium; Rohnert Park, CA	L 16–27	1,081	
October 12	at Cal State Northridge*	North Campus Stadium; Northridge, CA	L 14–40	1,844	
October 19	at San Francisco State	Cox Stadium; San Francisco, CA	L 26–35	943–1,300	
October 26	at Cal State Hayward	Pioneer Stadium; Hayward, CA	L 6–50	600–3,147	
November 2	at Saint Mary's*	Saint Mary's Stadium; Moraga, CA	W 17–13	1,529	
November 9	No. 2 UC Davis	Cossacks Stadium; Rohnert Park, CA	L 9–38	2,362	
November 16	at Humboldt State	Redwood Bowl; Arcata, CA	W 25–7	2,100–2,162	
*Non-conference game; Rankings from NCAA Division II Football Committee Poll released prior to the game
