= 1985 Cal State Hayward Pioneers football team =

American college football season

1985 Cal State Hayward Pioneers football
- Conference: Northern California Athletic Conference
- Record: 6–3–1 (2–2–1 NCAC)
- Head coach: Tim Tierney (11th season)
- Home stadium: Pioneer Stadium

1985 Northern California Athletic Conference football standings
	Conf.					Overall
Team	W		L		T	W		L		T
No. 1 UC Davis $^	5	–	0	–	0	9	–	2	–	0
Chico State	3	–	1	–	1	4	–	4	–	1
Cal State Hayward	2	–	2	–	1	6	–	3	–	1
San Francisco State	2	–	3	–	0	3	–	6	–	1
Sonoma State	1	–	4	–	0	3	–	7	–	0
Humboldt State	1	–	4	–	0	2	–	8	–	0
$ – Conference champion; ^ – NCAA Division II playoff participant; Rankings from NCAA Division II Football Committee poll

The 1985 Cal State Hayward Pioneers football team represented California State University, Hayward—now known as California State University, East Bay—as a member of the Northern California Athletic Conference (NCAC) during the 1985 NCAA Division II football season. Led by 11th-year head coach Tim Tierney, Cal State Hayward compiled an overall record of 6–3–1 with a mark of 2–2–1 in conference play, placing third in the NCAC. The team outscored its opponents 282 to 205 for the season. The Pioneers played home games at Pioneer Stadium in Hayward, California.

== Schedule ==
Date	Opponent	Rank	Site	Result	Attendance	Source
September 14	at Saint Mary's*		Saint Mary's Stadium; Moraga, CA	W 38–17	4,300	
September 21	No. 6 Cal Poly*		Pioneer Stadium; Hayward, CA	W 28–17	1,100	
September 28	at Cal Lutheran*	No. 9	Mt. Clef Field; Thousand Oaks, CA	W 37–15	4,500–5,400	
October 5	Cal State Northridge*	No. 6	Pioneer Stadium; Hayward, CA	W 25–20	1,200–2,300	
October 12	at San Francisco State	No. 6	Cox Stadium; San Francisco, CA	L 24–34	800–2,100	
October 19	at No. 10 Santa Clara*		Buck Shaw Stadium; Santa Clara, CA	L 6–10	6,122–6,211	
October 26	Sonoma State	No. T–18	Pioneer Stadium; Hayward, CA	W 50–6	600–3,147	
November 9	Humboldt State	No. 17	Pioneer Stadium; Hayward, CA	W 37–21	850	
November 16	at No. 1 UC Davis	No. 16	Toomey Field; Davis, CA	L 6–34	8,675–8,800	
November 23	Chico State		Pioneer Stadium; Hayward, CA	T 31–31	600	
*Non-conference game; Rankings from NCAA Division II Football Committee Poll released prior to the game
