= 1985 Santa Clara Broncos football team =

American college football season

1985 Santa Clara Broncos football

WFC champion
- Conference: Western Football Conference
- Record: 8–2–1 (4–0–1 WFC)
- Head coach: Terry Malley (1st season)
- Home stadium: Buck Shaw Stadium

1985 Western Football Conference standings
	Conf.					Overall
Team	W		L		T	W		L		T
No. 15 Santa Clara $	4	–	0	–	1	8	–	2	–	1
No. 19 Sacramento State	4	–	1	–	0	8	–	3	–	0
Portland State	2	–	2	–	1	4	–	5	–	1
Cal Poly	2	–	3	–	0	4	–	7	–	0
Cal Lutheran	1	–	4	–	0	6	–	5	–	0
Cal State Northridge	1	–	4	–	0	4	–	7	–	0
$ – Conference champion; Rankings from NCAA Division II Football Committee poll

The 1985 Santa Clara Broncos football team represented Santa Clara University as a member if the Western Football Conference (WFC) during the 1985 NCAA Division II football season. The WFC added two new members for the 1985 season, Cal Lutheran and Sacramento State.

The Broncos were led by first-year head coach Terry Malley, who took over the coaching job when his father, Pat Malley, died in May 1985. The Broncos played home games at Buck Shaw Stadium in Santa Clara, California. They finished the season as champion of the WFC, with a record of eight wins, two losses and one tie (8–2–1, 4–0–1 WFC). The Broncos outscored their opponents 306–203 for the season.

== Schedule ==
Date	Opponent	Rank	Site	Result	Attendance	Source
September 14	Chico State*		Buck Shaw Stadium; Santa Clara, CA	W 44–18	5,139	
September 21	at Humboldt State*		Redwood Bowl; Arcata, CA	W 37–0	2,989–4,500	
September 28	at No. 16 UC Davis*	No. 12	Toomey Field; Davis, CA	L 25–46	10,700	
October 5	at Sacramento State	No. T–17	Hornet Stadium; Sacramento, CA	W 17–14	7,725	
October 12	at Cal Poly	No. T–14	Mustang Stadium; San Luis Obispo, CA	W 12–6	4,024	
October 19	Cal State Hayward*	No. 10	Buck Shaw Stadium; Santa Clara, CA	W 10–6	6,122–6,211	
October 26	Cal Lutheran	No. 8	Buck Shaw Stadium; Santa Clara, CA	W 51–23	7,339	
November 2	at San Francisco State*	No. T–8	Cox Stadium; San Francisco, CA	W 53–30	3,000	
November 9	at Cal State Northridge	No. 6	North Campus Stadium; Northridge, CA	W 21–19	2,728	
November 16	Portland State	No. 4	Buck Shaw Stadium; Santa Clara, CA	T 20–20	5,673	
November 23	Saint Mary's*	No. 11	Buck Shaw Stadium; Santa Clara, CA	L 16–21	7,741	
*Non-conference game; Rankings from NCAA Division II Football Committee Poll released prior to the game

== After the season ==
=== NFL draft ===
The following Broncos were drafted into the National Football League following the season.

Round	Pick	Player	Position	NFL team
5	135	Brent Jones	Tight end	Pittsburgh Steelers
8	214	Steve Cisowski	Tackle	New York Giants
