= 1985 Sacramento State Hornets football team =

American college football season

1985 Sacramento State Hornets football
- Conference: Western Football Conference
- Record: 8–3 (4–1 WFC)
- Head coach: Bob Mattos (8th season)
- Home stadium: Hornet Stadium

1985 Western Football Conference standings
	Conf.					Overall
Team	W		L		T	W		L		T
No. 15 Santa Clara $	4	–	0	–	1	8	–	2	–	1
No. 19 Sacramento State	4	–	1	–	0	8	–	3	–	0
Portland State	2	–	2	–	1	4	–	5	–	1
Cal Poly	2	–	3	–	0	4	–	7	–	0
Cal Lutheran	1	–	4	–	0	6	–	5	–	0
Cal State Northridge	1	–	4	–	0	4	–	7	–	0
$ – Conference champion; Rankings from NCAA Division II Football Committee poll

The 1985 Sacramento State Hornets football team represented California State University, Sacramento as a member of the Western Football Conference (WFC) during the 1985 NCAA Division II football season. Led by eighth-year head coach Bob Mattos, Sacramento State compiled an overall record of 8–3 with a mark of 4–1 in conference play, placing second in the WFC. The team outscored its opponents 326 to 229 for the season. The Hornets played home games at Hornet Stadium in Sacramento, California.

1985 was the first year Sacramento State competed in the WFC. They had been a member of the Northern California Athletic Conference (NCAC) from 1954 to 1984.

== Schedule ==
Date	Opponent	Rank	Site	Result	Attendance	Source
September 7	at Pacific (CA)		Pacific Memorial Stadium; Stockton, CA	L 17–49	24,498	
September 21	at Sonoma State*		Cossacks Stadium; Rohnert Park, CA	W 63–10	842–861	
September 28	at Saint Mary's*		Saint Mary's Stadium; Moraga, CA	W 21–14	3,895	
October 5	No. T–17 Santa Clara		Hornet Stadium; Sacramento, CA	L 14–17	7,725	
October 12	at Portland State		Civic Stadium; Portland, OR	W 26–14	3,642	
October 19	at Humboldt State*		Redwood Bowl; Arcata, CA	W 39–30	2,190–4,200	
October 26	Chico State*		Hornet Stadium; Sacramento, CA	W 16–14	2,403–3,517	
November 2	Cal Poly	No. T–19	Hornet Stadium; Sacramento, CA	W 28–27	5,011–5,012	
November 9	at Cal Lutheran	No. 14	Mt. Clef Field; Thousand Oaks, CA	W 38–7	1,120	
November 16	Cal State Northridge	No. 13	Hornet Stadium; Sacramento, CA	W 34–10	3,108–3,500	
November 23	No. 1 UC Davis*	No. 14	Charles C. Hughes Stadium; Sacramento, CA (Causeway Classic)	L 30–37	12,100	
*Non-conference game; Rankings from NCAA Division II Football Committee Poll released prior to the game

== Team players in the NFL ==
The following Sacramento State players were selected in the 1986 NFL draft.

Player	Position	Round	Overall	NFL team
Greg Robinson	Tackle	5	137	New England Patriots
Mike Black	Tackle	9	237	Seattle Seahawks
