= Fred Freeman =

American football player and coach (born 1943)

Biographical details
- Born: December 29, 1943 (age 82)

Playing career
- 1963–1966: Mississippi Valley State
- Position: Tackle

Coaching career (HC unless noted)
- 1981–1983: Hampton (DC)
- 1984–1991: Hampton

Head coaching record
- Overall: 49–31–4
- Tournaments: 0–1 (NCAA D-II playoffs)

Accomplishments and honors

Championships
- 1 CIAA (1985); 2 CIAA Northern Division (1985, 1987)

Fred Freeman (born December 29, 1943) is an American former football player and coach. He was selected in the ninth round (213th overall) by the New York Giants in the 1967 NFL/AFL draft. Freeman served as the head football coach at Hampton University in Hampton, Virginia from 1984 to 1991, compiling a record of 49–31–4.

Freeman was an assistant coach at Howard University and Delaware State University prior to joining the coaching staff at Hampton in 1981. He served as defensive coordinator at Hampton for three season under Ed Wyche before succeeding him as head coach in 1984, when Wyche left for Alabama A&M University.

== Head coaching record ==
Year	Team	Overall	Conference	Standing	Bowl/playoffs	NCAA^{#}
Hampton Pirates (Central Intercollegiate Athletic Association) (1984–1991)
1984	Hampton	5–3–2	4–2–1	2nd (Northern)		
1985	Hampton	10–2	6–1	1st (Northern)	L NCAA Division II Quarterfinal	8
1986	Hampton	3–6–1	2–4–1	5th (Northern)		
1987	Hampton	9–3	6–1	1st (Northern)		15
1988	Hampton	7–3	3–3	3rd (Northern)		
1989	Hampton	8–1–1	4–1–1	T–2nd (Northern)		
1990	Hampton	5–5	3–3	T–3rd (Northern)		
1991	Hampton	2–9	2–6	9th		
Hampton:		49–31–4	30–21–3			
Total:		49–31–4				
National championship Conference title Conference division title or championship game berth
^{#}Rankings from final NCAA Division II Football Committee poll.
