= 1985 Cal Poly Mustangs football team =

American college football season

1985 Cal Poly Mustangs football
- Conference: Western Football Conference
- Record: 4–7 (2–3 WFC)
- Head coach: Jim Sanderson (4th season)
- Home stadium: Mustang Stadium

1985 Western Football Conference standings
| | Conf. | | | | | Overall |
| Team | W | | L | | T | W | | L | | T |
|---|---|---|---|---|---|---|---|---|---|---|
| No. 15 Santa Clara $ | 4 | – | 0 | – | 1 | 8 | – | 2 | – | 1 |
| No. 19 Sacramento State | 4 | – | 1 | – | 0 | 8 | – | 3 | – | 0 |
| Portland State | 2 | – | 2 | – | 1 | 4 | – | 5 | – | 1 |
| Cal Poly | 2 | – | 3 | – | 0 | 4 | – | 7 | – | 0 |
| Cal Lutheran | 1 | – | 4 | – | 0 | 6 | – | 5 | – | 0 |
| Cal State Northridge | 1 | – | 4 | – | 0 | 4 | – | 7 | – | 0 |
$ – Conference champion; Rankings from NCAA Division II Football Committee poll

The 1985 Cal Poly Mustangs football team represented California Polytechnic State University, San Luis Obispo as a member of the Western Football Conference (WFC) during the 1985 NCAA Division II football season. Led by fourth-year head coach Jim Sanderson, Cal Poly compiled an overall record of 4–7 with a mark of 2–3 in conference play, placing fourth in the WFC. The team was outscored by its opponents 303 to 266 for the season. The Mustangs played home games at Mustang Stadium in San Luis Obispo, California.

== Schedule ==
| Date | Opponent | Rank | Site | Result | Attendance | Source |
|---|---|---|---|---|---|---|
| September 14 | North Dakota State* | | Mustang Stadium; San Luis Obispo, CA | W 35–29 | 6,485 | |
| September 21 | at Cal State Hayward* | No. 6 | Pioneer Stadium; Hayward, CA | L 17–28 | 1,119 | |
| September 28 | at Fresno State* | | Bulldog Stadium; Fresno, CA | L 10–59 | 32,536 | |
| October 5 | No. T–7 UC Davis* | | Mustang Stadium; San Luis Obispo, CA (rivalry) | L 21–34 | 5,104 | |
| October 12 | No. T–14 Santa Clara | | Mustang Stadium; San Luis Obispo, CA | L 6–12 | 4,024 | |
| October 19 | Saint Mary's* | | Mustang Stadium; San Luis Obispo, CA | W 44–0 | 4,246 | |
| October 26 | at Cal State Northridge | | Devonshire Downs; Northridge, CA | W 34–21 | 5,335 | |
| November 2 | at No. T–19 Sacramento State | | Hornet Stadium; Sacramento, CA | L 27–28 | 5,012 | |
| November 9 | Portland State | | Mustang Stadium; San Luis Obispo, CA | W 34–21 | 2,590 | |
| November 16 | at Boise State* | | Bronco Stadium; Boise, ID | L 14–42 | 12,212 | |
| November 23 | at Cal Lutheran | | Mt. Clef Field; Thousand Oaks, CA | L 24–29 | 1,230 | |
*Non-conference game; Rankings from NCAA Division II Football Committee Poll released prior to the game

== Team players in the NFL ==
The following Cal Poly Mustang players were selected in the 1986 NFL draft.

| Player | Position | Round | Overall | NFL team |
| Sal Cesario | Tackle | 12 | 328 | New York Jets |
