= Earle Solomonson =

American football player and coach (born 1947)

Biographical details
- Born: September 2, 1947 (age 79)

Playing career
- c. 1965–1968: Augsburg

Coaching career (HC unless noted)
- 1969–1974: Richfield HS (MN) (DC)
- 1975–1978: Park Center HS (MN)
- 1979–1983: North Dakota State (DL)
- 1984: North Dakota State (DC)
- 1985–1986: North Dakota State
- 1987–1991: Montana State

Head coaching record
- Overall: 39–42–1 (college); 30–7 (high school)
- Tournaments: 6–0 (NCAA D-II playoffs)

Accomplishments and honors

Championships
- 2 NCAA Division II (1985–1986); 2 NCC (1985–1986)

Awards
- AFCA Division II COY (1986)

Earle Solomonson (born September 2, 1947) is an American former football player and coach. He served as the head football coach at North Dakota State University from 1985 to 1986 and at Montana State University from 1987 to 1991, compiling a career college football head coaching record of 39–42–1. Solomonson won back-to-back NCAA Division II Football Championships with the North Dakota State Bison in 1985 and 1986. He played college football at Augsburg College, from which he graduated in 1969.

Solomonson began his coaching career in 1969 as an assistant at Richfield High School in Richfield, Minnesota. He was the head football coach at Park Center High School in Brooklyn Park, Minnesota from 1975 to 1978, leading his teams to a record of 30–7 in four seasons. Solomonson joined the coaching staff at North Dakota State in 1979 as defensive line coach under head coach Don Morton. He was elevated to defensive coordinator in 1984, succeeding Mike Daly, who left the program to coach at Idaho State University.

== Head coaching record ==
=== College ===
Year	Team	Overall	Conference	Standing	Bowl/playoffs
North Dakota State Bison (North Central Conference) (1985–1986)
1985	North Dakota State	11–2–1	7–1–1	1st	W NCAA Division II Championship
1986	North Dakota State	13–0	9–0	1st	W NCAA Division II Championship
North Dakota State:		24–2–1	16–1–1		
Montana State Bobcats (Big Sky Conference) (1987–1991)
1987	Montana State	1–10	0–8	9th	
1988	Montana State	4–7	4–4	T–4th	
1989	Montana State	4–7	2–6	T–6th	
1990	Montana State	4–7	3–5	T–5th	
1991	Montana State	2–9	1–7	T–8th	
Montana State:		15–40	10–30		
Total:		39–42–1			
National championship Conference title Conference division title or championship game berth
