= 1985 North Dakota State Bison football team =

American college football season

1985 North Dakota State Bison football

NCAA Division II champion NCC champion

NCAA Division II Championship Game, W 35–7 vs. North Alabama
- Conference: North Central Conference
- Record: 11–2–1 (7–1–1 NCC)
- Head coach: Earle Solomonson (1st season)
- Home stadium: Dacotah Field

1985 North Central Conference football standings
	Conf.					Overall
Team	W		L		T	W		L		T
No. 7 North Dakota State $^	7	–	1	–	1	11	–	2	–	1
No. 4 South Dakota ^	7	–	2	–	0	10	–	3	–	0
South Dakota State	7	–	2	–	0	7	–	4	–	0
Morningside	5	–	3	–	1	7	–	3	–	1
St. Cloud State	5	–	4	–	0	6	–	5	–	0
Mankato State	4	–	5	–	0	5	–	6	–	0
Nebraska–Omaha	4	–	5	–	0	6	–	5	–	0
Northern Colorado	2	–	7	–	0	2	–	9	–	0
North Dakota	2	–	7	–	0	3	–	8	–	0
Augustana (SD)	1	–	8	–	0	1	–	9	–	0
$ – Conference champion; ^ – NCAA Division II playoff participant; Rankings from NCAA Division II Football Committee poll

The 1985 North Dakota State football team represented North Dakota State University during the 1985 NCAA Division II football season, and completed the 89th season of Bison football. The Bison played their home games at Dacotah Field in Fargo, North Dakota. The 1985 team came off an 11–2 record from the previous season. The 1985 team was led by coach Earle Solomonson. The team finished the regular season with an 8–2–1 record and made the NCAA Division II playoffs. The Bison defeated the North Alabama Lions 35–7 in the National Championship Game en route to the program's second NCAA Division II Football Championship.

== Schedule ==
Date	Time	Opponent	Rank	Site	TV	Result	Attendance	Source
September 7		at Northern Michigan*		Memorial Field; Marquette, MI		W 26–10	6,127	
September 14		at Cal Poly*		Mustang Stadium; San Luis Obispo, CA		L 29–35	6,845	
September 21		Mankato State	No. T–11	Dacotah Field; Fargo, ND		W 35–16	14,800	
September 28		at No. 1 South Dakota	No. T–7	DakotaDome; Vermillion, SD		L 14–38	8,300	
October 5		Northern Colorado		Dacotah Field; Fargo, ND		W 40–13	11,500	
October 12		No. 18 South Dakota State		Dacotah Field; Fargo, ND (rivalry)		W 41–7	15,000	
October 19		at No. 12 St. Cloud State		Selke Field; St. Cloud, MN		W 35–19	3,886	
October 26		Morningside	No. 12	Dacotah Field; Fargo, ND		T 18–18	10,500	
November 2		at Nebraska–Omaha		Al F. Caniglia Field; Omaha, NE		W 13–12	4,200	
November 9		at Augustana (SD)		Howard Wood Field; Sioux Falls, SD		W 25–0	284	
November 16		North Dakota		Dacotah Field; Fargo, ND (Nickel Trophy)		W 49–0	13,000	
November 30	10:30 a.m.	at No. 1 UC Davis*	No. 7	Toomey Field; Davis, CA (NCAA Division II Quarterfinal)	KCRA-TV	W 31–12	8,100	
December 7		at No. 4 South Dakota	No. 7	DakotaDome; Vermillion, SD (NCAA Division II Semifinal)		W 16–7	10,000	
December 14		vs. No. 2 North Alabama*	No. 7	McAllen Veterans Memorial Stadium; McAllen, TX (NCAA Division II Championship Game—Palm Bowl)		W 35–7	6,000	
*Non-conference game; Rankings from NCAA Division II Football Committee Poll released prior to the game; All times are in Central time
