= 1985 UC Davis Aggies football team =

American college football team

1985 UC Davis Aggies football

NCAC champion

NCAA Division II Quarterfinal, L 12–31 at North Dakota State
- Conference: Northern California Athletic Conference
- Record: 9–2 (5–0 NCAC)
- Head coach: Jim Sochor (16th season)
- Home stadium: Toomey Field

1985 Northern California Athletic Conference football standings
	Conf.					Overall
Team	W		L		T	W		L		T
No. 1 UC Davis $^	5	–	0	–	0	9	–	2	–	0
Chico State	3	–	1	–	1	4	–	4	–	1
Cal State Hayward	2	–	2	–	1	6	–	3	–	1
San Francisco State	2	–	3	–	0	3	–	6	–	1
Sonoma State	1	–	4	–	0	3	–	7	–	0
Humboldt State	1	–	4	–	0	2	–	8	–	0
$ – Conference champion; ^ – NCAA Division II playoff participant; Rankings from NCAA Division II Football Committee poll

The 1985 UC Davis football team represented the University of California, Davis as a member of the Northern California Athletic Conference (NCAC) during the 1985 NCAA Division II football season. Led by 16th-year head coach Jim Sochor, UC Davis compiled an overall record of 9–2 with a mark of 5–0 in conference play, winning the NCAC title for the 15th consecutive season. 1985 was the team's 16th consecutive winning season. With the 5–0 conference record, the team stretched their conference winning streak to 26 games dating back to the 1981 season. The Aggies were ranked No. 1 in the last three NCAA Division II polls. They advanced to the NCAA Division II Football Championship playoffs for the fourth straight year, where they lost to North Dakota State in the quarterfinals. This was the third straight year that North Dakota State eliminated UC Davis in the playoffs. The team outscored its opponents 388 to 191 for the season. The Aggies played home games at Toomey Field in Davis, California.

== Schedule ==
Date	Time	Opponent	Rank	Site	TV	Result	Attendance	Source
September 14		at Boise State*		Bronco Stadium; Boise, ID		L 9–13	17,654	
September 28		No. 12 Santa Clara*	No. 16	Toomey Field; Davis, CA		W 46–25	10,312	
October 5		at Cal Poly*	No. T–7	Mustang Stadium; San Luis Obispo, CA (rivalry)		W 34–21	5,104	
October 12		Humboldt State	No. 8	Toomey Field; Davis, CA		W 45–14	8,612–9,250	
October 19		at Chico State	No. 6	University Stadium; Chico, CA		W 27–8	8,312–8,352	
October 26		San Francisco State	No. 3	Toomey Field; Davis, CA		W 65–12	7,750	
November 2		Cal State Northridge*	No. 2	Toomey Field; Davis, CA		W 41–22	7,250–7,850	
November 9		at Sonoma State	No. 2	Cossacks Stadium (Note: Seawolf Stadium was known as Cossacks Stadium until 2002 when the University changed the mascot from Cossacks to Seawolves.); Rohnert Park, CA		W 38–9	2,362	
November 16		No. 16 Cal State Hayward	No. 1	Toomey Field; Davis, CA		W 34–6	8,675–8,800	
November 23		at No. 14 Sacramento State*	No. 1	Charles C. Hughes Stadium; Sacramento, CA (Causeway Classic)		W 37–30	12,100	
November 30	12:30 p.m.	No. 7 North Dakota State*	No. 1	Toomey Field; Davis, CA (NCAA Division II Quarterfinal)	KCRA-TV	L 12–31	8,100	
*Non-conference game; Rankings from NCAA Division II Football Committee Poll released prior to the game; All times are in Pacific time

== NFL draft ==
The following UC Davis Aggies players were selected in the 1986 NFL draft.

Player	Position	Round	Overall	NFL team
Mike Wise	Defensive end	4	85	Los Angeles Raiders
