= 1985 NCAA Division II football season =

American college football season

- Regular season: August – November 1985
- Playoffs: December 1985
- National Championship: Palm Bowl; Veterans Stadium; McAllen, TX
- Champion: North Dakota State (2)

The 1985 NCAA Division II football season, part of college football in the United States organized by the National Collegiate Athletic Association at the Division II level, began in August 1985, and concluded with the NCAA Division II Football Championship on December 14, 1985, at McAllen Veterans Memorial Stadium in McAllen, Texas. During the game's five-year stretch in McAllen, the "City of Palms", it was referred to as the Palm Bowl. The North Dakota State Bison defeated the North Alabama Lions, 35–7, to win their second Division II national title.

== Conference changes and new programs ==
- Cal Lutheran became a full member of the Western Football Conference after joining provisionally in 1984.

School	1984 Conference	1985 Conference
C.W. Post	D-II Independent	Liberty (D-III)
Eastern New Mexico	Independent (NAIA D-I)	Lone Star
Sacramento State	NCAC	Western

== Conference standings ==
1985 Central Intercollegiate Athletic Association football standings
	Conf.					Overall
Team	W		L		T	W		L		T
Northern Division
No. 8 Hampton xy$^	6	–	1	–	0	10	–	2	–	0
Norfolk State	5	–	2	–	0	6	–	4	–	0
Elizabeth City State	4	–	3	–	0	6	–	4	–	0
Virginia Union	4	–	3	–	0	6	–	4	–	0
Virginia State	3	–	3	–	1	4	–	5	–	1
Saint Paul's (VA)	0	–	7	–	0	2	–	8	–	0
Southern Division
No. 18 Winston-Salem State xy	7	–	1	–	0	9	–	2	–	0
Livingstone	5	–	2	–	0	7	–	3	–	0
North Carolina Central	4	–	4	–	0	4	–	6	–	0
Fayetteville State	3	–	3	–	1	4	–	5	–	1
Johnson C. Smith	1	–	6	–	0	1	–	9	–	0
Bowie State	0	–	7	–	0	0	–	10	–	0
Championship: Hampton 13, Winston-Salem State 7
$ – Conference champion; x – Division champion/co-champions; y – Championship game participant; ^ – NCAA Division II playoff participant; Rankings from NCAA Division II Football Committee poll

1985 Great Lakes Intercollegiate Athletic Conference football standings
	Conf.					Overall
Team	W		L		T	W		L		T
No. 2 Hillsdale $^	5	–	1	–	0	11	–	1	–	1
Saginaw Valley State	4	–	1	–	1	4	–	5	–	1
Ferris State	4	–	2	–	0	6	–	4	–	0
Grand Valley State	4	–	2	–	0	6	–	5	–	0
Northwood	2	–	3	–	1	3	–	4	–	2
Wayne State (MI)	1	–	5	–	0	1	–	8	–	1
Michigan Tech	0	–	6	–	0	1	–	9	–	0
$ – Conference champion; ^ – NAIA Division I playoff participant; Rankings from NAIA Division I poll

1985 Gulf South Conference football standings
	Conf.					Overall
Team	W		L		T	W		L		T
No. 2 North Alabama $^	7	–	1	–	0	12	–	2	–	0
No. 17 Mississippi College	6	–	1	–	1	7	–	2	–	1
Troy State	6	–	2	–	0	6	–	4	–	0
Livingston	4	–	4	–	0	6	–	5	–	0
Delta State	3	–	4	–	1	4	–	6	–	1
Jacksonville State	3	–	5	–	0	3	–	6	–	1
Valdosta State	3	–	5	–	0	5	–	6	–	0
West Georgia	3	–	5	–	0	5	–	5	–	0
Tennessee–Martin	0	–	8	–	0	1	–	10	–	0
$ – Conference champion; ^ – NCAA Division II playoff participant; Rankings from NCAA Division II Football Committee poll

1985 Heartland Collegiate Conference standings
	Conf.					Overall
Team	W		L		T	W		L		T
Butler +	5	–	1	–	0	8	–	2	–	0
Ashland +	5	–	1	–	0	6	–	4	–	0
Indiana Central	4	–	1	–	1	7	–	1	–	2
Valparaiso	2	–	4	–	0	6	–	4	–	0
Saint Joseph's (IN)	2	–	4	–	0	3	–	7	–	0
Franklin (IN)	1	–	4	–	1	5	–	4	–	1
Evansville	1	–	5	–	0	2	–	8	–	0
+ – Conference co-champions

1985 Lone Star Conference football standings
	Conf.					Overall
Team	W		L		T	W		L		T
Texas A&I $	5	–	0	–	0	8	–	3	–	0
Angelo State	3	–	2	–	0	7	–	4	–	0
Eastern New Mexico	3	–	2	–	0	5	–	5	–	0
Abilene Christian	2	–	3	–	0	5	–	4	–	2
East Texas State	2	–	3	–	0	5	–	5	–	0
Howard Payne	0	–	5	–	0	2	–	6	–	2
$ – Conference champion

1985 Missouri Intercollegiate Athletic Association football standings
	Conf.					Overall
Team	W		L		T	W		L		T
No. 11 NE Missouri State $	5	–	0	–	0	8	–	3	–	0
Missouri–Rolla	4	–	1	–	0	7	–	3	–	0
NW Missouri State	2	–	3	–	0	4	–	6	–	1
SE Missouri State	2	–	3	–	0	4	–	7	–	0
Central Missouri State	2	–	3	–	0	3	–	7	–	0
Lincoln (MO)	0	–	5	–	0	1	–	10	–	0
$ – Conference champion; Rankings from NCAA Division II Football Committee poll

1985 North Central Conference football standings
	Conf.					Overall
Team	W		L		T	W		L		T
No. 7 North Dakota State $^	7	–	1	–	1	11	–	2	–	1
No. 4 South Dakota ^	7	–	2	–	0	10	–	3	–	0
South Dakota State	7	–	2	–	0	7	–	4	–	0
Morningside	5	–	3	–	1	7	–	3	–	1
St. Cloud State	5	–	4	–	0	6	–	5	–	0
Mankato State	4	–	5	–	0	5	–	6	–	0
Nebraska–Omaha	4	–	5	–	0	6	–	5	–	0
Northern Colorado	2	–	7	–	0	2	–	9	–	0
North Dakota	2	–	7	–	0	3	–	8	–	0
Augustana (SD)	1	–	8	–	0	1	–	9	–	0
$ – Conference champion; ^ – NCAA Division II playoff participant; Rankings from NCAA Division II Football Committee poll

1985 Northern California Athletic Conference football standings
	Conf.					Overall
Team	W		L		T	W		L		T
No. 1 UC Davis $^	5	–	0	–	0	9	–	2	–	0
Chico State	3	–	1	–	1	4	–	4	–	1
Cal State Hayward	2	–	2	–	1	6	–	3	–	1
San Francisco State	2	–	3	–	0	3	–	6	–	1
Sonoma State	1	–	4	–	0	3	–	7	–	0
Humboldt State	1	–	4	–	0	2	–	8	–	0
$ – Conference champion; ^ – NCAA Division II playoff participant; Rankings from NCAA Division II Football Committee poll

1985 Northern Intercollegiate Conference football standings
	Conf.					Overall
Team	W		L		T	W		L		T
Minnesota Duluth $	6	–	0	–	0	8	–	2	–	0
No. 9 Moorhead State	5	–	1	–	0	8	–	2	–	0
Bemidji State	3	–	3	–	0	7	–	3	–	0
Southwest State (MN)	3	–	3	–	0	6	–	4	–	0
Minnesota Morris	3	–	3	–	0	3	–	7	–	0
Northern State	1	–	5	–	0	3	–	6	–	1
Winona State	0	–	6	–	0	2	–	9	–	0
$ – Conference champion; Rankings from NAIA Division I poll

1985 Pennsylvania State Athletic Conference football standings
	Conf.					Overall
Team	W		L		T	W		L		T
East Division
No. 3 Bloomsburg xy$^	6	–	0	–	0	12	–	1	–	0
West Chester	5	–	1	–	0	7	–	3	–	0
Millersville	4	–	2	–	0	8	–	2	–	0
Mansfield	2	–	4	–	0	4	–	6	–	0
East Stroudsburg	2	–	4	–	0	2	–	8	–	0
Cheyney	1	–	5	–	0	2	–	8	–	0
Kutztown	1	–	5	–	0	1	–	9	–	0
West Division
No. 9 IUP xy	6	–	0	–	0	8	–	2	–	1
No. 16 Clarion	5	–	1	–	0	8	–	2	–	0
Edinboro	3	–	3	–	0	5	–	4	–	1
Shippensburg	3	–	3	–	0	5	–	5	–	0
Slippery Rock	2	–	4	–	0	5	–	5	–	0
California (PA)	1	–	5	–	0	4	–	6	–	0
Lock Haven	1	–	5	–	0	3	–	7	–	0
Championship: Bloomsburg 31, IUP 9
$ – Conference champion; x – Division champion/co-champions; y – Championship game participant; ^ – NCAA Division II playoff participant; Rankings from NCAA Division II Football Committee poll

1985 Southern Intercollegiate Athletic Conference football standings
	Conf.					Overall
Team	W		L		T	W		L		T
Division II
No. 6 Fort Valley State x^	5	–	1	–	0	9	–	3	–	0
No. 12 Albany State x	5	–	1	–	0	9	–	2	–	0
Morris Brown	4	–	2	–	0	5	–	5	–	0
Tuskegee	2	–	3	–	1	3	–	6	–	1
Savannah State	2	–	4	–	0	2	–	9	–	0
Morehouse	1	–	4	–	1	3	–	6	–	1
Clark	1	–	5	–	0	2	–	6	–	0
Alabama A&M *	0	–	0	–	0	3	–	7	–	1
Division III
Miles x	3	–	1	–	0	3	–	8	–	0
Lane	1	–	2	–	0	3	–	5	–	1
Knoxville	1	–	2	–	0	5	–	5	–	0
+ – Conference co-champions; ^ – NCAA Division II playoff participant; * - Alabama A&M was ineligible for the conference title due to not scheduling enough conference games. Games against Alabama A&M did not count as conference games.; Rankings from NCAA Division II Football Committee poll

1985 Western Football Conference standings
	Conf.					Overall
Team	W		L		T	W		L		T
No. 15 Santa Clara $	4	–	0	–	1	8	–	2	–	1
No. 19 Sacramento State	4	–	1	–	0	8	–	3	–	0
Portland State	2	–	2	–	1	4	–	5	–	1
Cal Poly	2	–	3	–	0	4	–	7	–	0
Cal Lutheran	1	–	4	–	0	6	–	5	–	0
Cal State Northridge	1	–	4	–	0	4	–	7	–	0
$ – Conference champion; Rankings from NCAA Division II Football Committee poll

1985 NCAA Division II independents football records
	Conf.			Overall
Team	W	L	T	W		L		T
No. 14 American International		–		8	–	2	–	0
No. 10 Towson State		–		7	–	2	–	1
No. 5 Central State (OH) ^		–		8	–	3	–	0
Northern Michigan		–		6	–	3	–	0
New Haven		–		6	–	4	–	0
Southern Connecticut State		–		4	–	5	–	0
Liberty		–		3	–	4	–	1
UCF		–		4	–	7	–	0
Central Connecticut		–		3	–	7	–	0
Saint Mary's		–		3	–	8	–	0
Springfield		–		2	–	8	–	0
Kentucky State		–		0	–	11	–	0
^ – NCAA Division II playoff participant; Rankings from NCAA Division II Football Committee poll

== Conference summaries ==
Conference Champions

Central Intercollegiate Athletic Association – Hampton
Great Lakes Intercollegiate Athletic Conference – Hillsdale
Gulf South Conference – North Alabama
Heartland Collegiate Conference – Butler and Ashland
Lone Star Conference – Texas A&I
Missouri Intercollegiate Athletic Association – Northeast Missouri State
North Central Conference – North Dakota State
Northern California Athletic Conference – UC Davis
Northern Intercollegiate Conference – Minnesota–Duluth
Pennsylvania State Athletic Conference – Bloomsburg
Rocky Mountain Athletic Conference – Colorado Mesa
South Atlantic Conference – Mars Hill
Southern Intercollegiate Athletic Conference – Albany State and Fort Valley State

== Postseason ==
1985 NCAA Division II Football Championship
- Teams: 8
- Finals Site: Veterans Stadium; McAllen, TX
- Champion: North Dakota State; (2nd title, 4th title game)
- Runner-up: North Alabama; (1st title game)
- Semifinalists: South Dakota; Bloomsburg
- Winning coach: Earle Solomonson; 1st championship

The 1985 NCAA Division II Football Championship playoffs were the 13th single-elimination tournament to determine the national champion of men's NCAA Division II college football. The championship game was held at McAllen Veterans Memorial Stadium in McAllen, Texas, for the fifth, and final, time.

=== Playoff bracket ===
First round Campus sites
North Dakota State	31
UC Davis	12
South Dakota	13**
Central State (OH)	10
Bloomsburg	38
Hampton	28
North Alabama	14
Fort Valley State	7

Semifinals; Campus sites
North Dakota State	16
South Dakota	7
Bloomsburg	0
North Alabama	34

Championship; McAllen Veterans Memorial Stadium; McAllen, TX
North Dakota State	35
North Alabama	7

== See also ==
- 1985 NCAA Division I-A football season
- 1985 NCAA Division I-AA football season
- 1985 NCAA Division III football season
- 1985 NAIA Division I football season
- 1985 NAIA Division II football season
