= 1985 NCAA Division II football rankings =

The 1985 NCAA Division II football rankings are from the NCAA Division II football committee. This is for the 1985 season.

== Legend ==
	Increase in ranking
	Decrease in ranking
	Not ranked previous week
(#–#)	Win–loss record
(Italics)	Number of first place votes
т	Tied with team above or below also with this symbol

== NCAA Division II Football Committee poll ==
	Week 1 Sept 18	Week 2 Sept 25	Week 3 Oct 2	Week 4 Oct 9	Week 5 Oct 16	Week 6 Oct 23	Week 7 Oct 30	Week 8 Nov 6	Week 9 Nov 13	Week 10 Nov 20	Week 11 Nov 27	
1.	South Dakota (2–0) (2)	South Dakota (3–0) (4)	South Dakota (4–0) (4)	South Dakota (5–0) (4)	South Dakota (6–0) (4)	Central State (OH) (6–0) (4)	Central State (OH) (7–0) (3)	Central State (OH) (8–0) (4)	UC Davis (7–1) (3)	UC Davis (8–1) (4)	UC Davis (9–1) (4)	1.
2.	Towson State (2–0) (1)	Towson State (3–0)	Towson State (4–0)	Central State (OH) (4–0) т	Central State (OH) (5–0)	Fort Valley State (6–0)	UC Davis (6–0–1) (1)	UC Davis (6–1)	Fort Valley State (8–1)	Fort Valley State (9–1)	North Alabama (10–1)	2.
3.	Fort Valley State (1–0)	Fort Valley State (2–0)	Fort Valley State (3–0)	Fort Valley State (4–0) т	Fort Valley State (5–0)	UC Davis (4–1)	Towson State (6–1)	Towson State (7–0–1)	IUP (7–1–1) (1)	IUP (8–1–1)	Bloomsburg (11–0)	3.
4.	Central State (OH) (2–0)	Central State (OH) (3–0)	Central State (OH) (3–0)	Towson State (4–0–1)	Towson State (5–0–1)	Towson State (6–0–1)	Fort Valley State (7–1)	Fort Valley State (7–1)	Santa Clara (8–1)	North Alabama (9–1)	South Dakota (9–2)	4.
5.	Texas A&I (1–0)	Norfolk State (2–1)	Norfolk State (3–1)	Norfolk State (4–1)	Norfolk State (5–1)	South Dakota (6–1)	South Dakota (6–1)	IUP (6–1–1)	Central State (OH) (8–1)	Bloomsburg (10–0)	Central State (OH) (8–2)	5.
6.	Cal Poly (1–0) (Note: In the actual printed polls, Cal Poly was listed as Cal Poly at San Luis Obispo)	Southern Connecticut State (2–0)	Cal State Hayward (3–0)	Cal State Hayward (4–0)	UC Davis (3–1)	IUP (4–1–1)	Mississippi College (5–1–1)	Santa Clara (7–1)	North Alabama (8–1)	South Dakota (9–2)	Fort Valley State (9–2)	6.
7.	Livingston (2–0)	North Dakota State (2–1) т	UC Davis (1–1) т	Abilene Christian (3–0–1)	IUP (3–1–1)	Mississippi College (5–1)	IUP (7–0)	North Alabama (7–1)	Bloomsburg (9–0)	Northeast Missouri State (8–2)	North Dakota State (8–2–1)	7.
8.	Nebraska–Omaha (2–0) (1)	Mississippi College (2–1) т	Northern Michigan (3–1) т	UC Davis (2–1) т	Bloomsburg (5–0) т	Santa Clara (5–1)	Bloomsburg (6–1) т	Bloomsburg (8–0)	Towson State (7–1–1)	Winston–Salem State (9–1)	Hampton (10–1)	8.
9.	Abilene Christian (2–0)	Cal State Hayward (2–0)	Abilene Christian (2–0–1)	Northern Michigan (4–1) т	Mississippi College (4–1) т	Bloomsburg (6–0)	Santa Clara (6–0–2) т	Indiana Central (7–0–2)	Winston–Salem State (8–1)	Towson State (7–1–1)	IUP (8–2–1)	9.
10.	Troy State (0–1)	Abilene Christian (2–0–1)	IUP (2–1) т	IUP (2–1–1)	Santa Clara (4–1)	Indiana Central (5–0–2)	Indiana Central (6–1)	South Dakota (7–2)	South Dakota (8–2)	Central State (OH) (8–2)	Towson State (7–2–1)	10.
11.	Norfolk State (1–1) т	Northern Michigan (2–1)	Southern Connecticut State (3–0) т	Bloomsburg (4–0) т	North Alabama (4–1)	North Alabama (5–1)	North Alabama (6–1)	Mississippi College (6–2)	Mississippi College (7–2)	Santa Clara (8–1–1)	Northeast Missouri State (8–3)	11.
12.	North Dakota State (1–1) т	Santa Clara (2–0)	Mississippi College (2–1)	Mississippi College (3–1) т	St. Cloud State (5–1)	North Dakota State (5–2)	Winston–Salem State (6–2)	American International (7–2)	Butler (8–2)	Mississippi College (7–2)	Albany State (9–2) т	12.
13.	Portland State (1–1)	Livingston (2–1)	California (PA) (3–0)	Valparaiso (5–0)	Winston–Salem State (4–1)	Winston–Salem State (5–1)	Norfolk State (5–2)	Butler (7–2)	Sacramento State (7–2)	Butler (8–2)	Butler (8–2) т	13.
14.	IUP (1–1) (Note: In the actual printed polls, IUP was listed as Indiana (PA))	IUP (1–1)	Indiana Central (3–0–1)	North Alabama (3–1) т	Millersville (5–0)	Norfolk State (5–2) т	Northern Michigan (6–2)	Sacramento State (6–2)	Northeast Missouri State (7–2)	Sacramento State (8–2)	American International (8–2)	14.
15.	Northeast Missouri State (2–0)	Hampton (3–0)	Portland State (2–2)	Santa Clara (3–1) т	Butler (5–1)	Northern Michigan (5–2) т	Butler (6–2)	Albany State (7–1)	American International (7–2)	American International (8–2)	Santa Clara (8–2–1)	15.
16.	Mississippi College (1–1)	UC Davis (0–1)	Bloomsburg (3–0)	Millersville (4–0)	Northern Michigan (4–2)	Valparaiso (6–1)	American International (6–2)	Hampton (7–1)	Cal State Hayward (6–2)	Hampton (9–1)	Clarion (8–2)	16.
17.	UC Davis (0–1) т (Note: In the actual printed polls, UC Davis was sometimes listed as California Davis)	Texas A&I (1–1)	North Alabama (2–1) т	Butler (4–1)	Clarion (5–1)	Hampton (6–1)	Hampton (7–1)	Cal State Hayward (5–2)	West Chester (7–2)	Clarion (8–2)	Mississippi College (7–2–1)	17.
18.	East Texas State (1–0) т	Indiana Central (2–0–1)	Santa Clara (2–1) т	South Dakota State (3–2)	Indiana Central (4–0–2)	American International (5–2) т	Cal State Hayward (5–2)	West Chester (6–2)	Hampton (8–1)	North Dakota State (8–2–1)	Winston–Salem State (9–2)	18.
19.	Northern Michigan (1–1)	California (PA) (2–0)	Valparaiso (4–0)	Winston–Salem State (3–1)	Valparaiso (5–1)	Cal State Hayward (4–2) т	Sacramento State (5–2) т (Note: In the actual printed polls, Sacramento State was listed as Cal State Sacramento)	Northeast Missouri State (6–2)	Clarion (8–2)	Indiana Central (7–1–2)	Sacramento State (8–3)	19.
20.	Southern Connecticut State (1–0)	Morningside (3–0)	Butler (3–1)	Clarion (4–1)	Abilene Christian (3–1–1)	Millersville (5–1) т	Clarion (6–2) т	Clarion (7–2)	Indiana Central (7–1–2)	Texas A&I (7–3)	Texas A&I (8–3)	20.
21.							Millersville (6–1) т					21.
	Week 1 Sept 18	Week 2 Sept 25	Week 3 Oct 2	Week 4 Oct 9	Week 5 Oct 16	Week 6 Oct 23	Week 7 Oct 30	Week 8 Nov 6	Week 9 Nov 13	Week 10 Nov 20	Week 11 Nov 27	
		Dropped: 6 Cal Poly; 8 Nebraska–Omaha; 10 Troy State; 13 Portland State; 15 Northeast Missouri State; 18 East Texas State	Dropped: 7 North Dakota State; 13 Livingston; 15 Hampton; 17 Texas A&I; 20 Morningside	Dropped: 11 Southern Connecticut State; 13 California (PA); 14 Indiana Central; 15 Portland State	Dropped: 6 Cal State Hayward; 18 South Dakota State	Dropped: 12 St. Cloud State; 15 Butler; 17 Clarion; 20 Abilene Christian	Dropped: 12 North Dakota State; 16 Valparaiso	Dropped: 12 Winston–Salem State; 13 Norfolk State; 14 Northern Michigan; 20 Millersville	Dropped: 15 Albany State	Dropped: 16 Cal State Hayward; 17 West Chester	Dropped: 19 Indiana Central	
