= List of Santa Clara Broncos in the NFL draft =

This is a list of Santa Clara Broncos football players in the NFL draft.

== Key ==
B	Back	K	Kicker	NT	Nose tackle
C	Center	LB	Linebacker	FB	Fullback
DB	Defensive back	P	Punter	HB	Halfback
DE	Defensive end	QB	Quarterback	WR	Wide receiver
DT	Defensive tackle	RB	Running back	G	Guard
E	End	T	Offensive tackle	TE	Tight end

== Selections ==
Year	Round	Pick	Overall	Player	Team	Position
1937	2	6	16	Nello Falaschi	Washington Redskins	B
1937	4	6	36	Dick Bassi	Washington Redskins	G
1938	9	5	75	Phil Dougherty	Chicago Cardinals	C
1939	3	1	16	Alvord Wolff	Chicago Cardinals	T
1939	6	10	50	Jerry Ginney	New York Giants	G
1939	12	7	107	Jim Coughlan	Detroit Lions	E
1939	15	1	131	Russ Clarke	Chicago Cardinals	G
1939	22	4	199	Bill Gunther	Green Bay Packers	B
1940	2	3	13	John Schiechl	Philadelphia Eagles	C
1940	8	5	65	Bob Anahu	Cleveland Rams	E
1940	10	1	81	Jack Roche	Chicago Cardinals	B
1940	14	2	122	Nick Stublar	Pittsburgh Steelers	T
1940	15	3	133	Ray McCarthy	Pittsburgh Steelers	B
1941	13	9	119	Jim Johnson	Chicago Bears	B
1942	3	1	16	Ken Casanega	Pittsburgh Steelers	B
1942	7	4	54	Rupe Thornton	Chicago Cardinals	G
1942	13	2	112	Ray Bradfield	Cleveland Rams	E
1942	18	3	163	Bill Braun	Philadelphia Eagles	T
1943	8	9	69	Alyn Beals	Chicago Bears	E
1943	20	8	188	Eddie Forrest	Green Bay Packers	C
1943	21	9	199	Al Santucci	Chicago Bears	C
1944	6	3	46	Ed Alliquie	Detroit Lions	T
1944	7	9	63	Jesse Freitas	Pittsburgh Steelers	B
1944	19	4	190	Tony Schiro	Philadelphia Eagles	G
1944	25	10	262	Bert Gianelli	Cleveland Rams	G
1945	20	10	207	Pete Davis	New York Giants	B
1945	20	11	208	Bill Prentice	Green Bay Packers	B
1946	21	5	195	Mel Patton	New York Giants	B
1946	23	5	215	Vernon Hare	New York Giants	B
1946	24	4	224	Visco Grgich	Chicago Bears	E
1946	24	9	229	Bob Rodas	Washington Redskins	G
1949	12	6	117	Bill Renna	Los Angeles Rams	C
1950	2	5	19	Hall Haynes	Washington Redskins	B
1950	8	7	99	John Hock	Chicago Cardinals	T
1950	8	9	101	Ellery Williams	San Francisco 49ers	E
1950	13	8	165	Jerry Hennessy	Chicago Cardinals	E
1950	14	9	179	Tom Payne	San Francisco 49ers	E
1950	22	12	286	Jim Dowling	Cleveland Browns	G
1951	29	10	349	John Justice	Chicago Bears	G
1952	18	11	216	Ken Mirchi	Cleveland Browns	G
1952	22	9	262	Jim Cozad	San Francisco 49ers	T
1953	14	10	167	Gern Nagler	Cleveland Browns	E
1953	28	7	332	Joe Ramona	New York Giants	G
1971	1	3	3	Dan Pastorini	Houston Oilers	QB
1973	14	18	356	Jay Corey	Detroit Lions	T
1974	10	3	237	John Ketchoyian	San Diego Chargers	LB
1978	9	21	243	John Hurley	Washington Redskins	QB
1979	3	20	76	Doug Cosbie	Dallas Cowboys	TE
1980	7	21	186	Jim Leonard	Tampa Bay Buccaneers	C
1982	11	23	302	Perry Parmelee	New York Jets	WR
1984	10	15	267	Gary Hoffman	Green Bay Packers	T
1986	5	25	135	Brent Jones	Pittsburgh Steelers	TE
1986	8	20	214	Steve Cisowski	New York Giants	T
