= Malley =

Malley is a surname. Notable people with the surname include:

- Alex Malley, chief executive of CPA Australia
- Bill Malley, American production designer and art director
- Bill Malley (golfer) (born 1952), American golfer
- Connor Malley (born 2000), English footballer
- Garnet Malley (1892–1961), World War I flying ace
- Gemma Malley, author of The Declaration (novel)
- George Malley (American football) (1903–1979), American football coach
- George Malley (athlete) (born 1955), American steeplechase and long-distance runner
- Keith Malley, American stand-up comedian and podcaster
- Michael Malley (born 1962), Canadian politician from New Brunswick
- Pat Malley (died 1985), American football coach
- Phil Malley (born 1965), English footballer
- Robert Malley (born 1963), American lawyer, political scientist, specialist in conflict resolution
- Simon Malley (1923–2006), francophone journalist
- Terry Malley (born 1954), American football coach
- William C. Malley (1868–1908), American football player and coach

== Fictional characters ==
- Ern Malley, fictitious poet, the central figure in Australia's most celebrated literary hoax

== See also ==
- Malley Fitness Center, at Santa Clara University
- CIG de Malley, indoor arena in Lausanne, Switzerland
- ES FC Malley, football club from Malley, Switzerland
- Maley, a surname
- Mally (disambiguation)
- Maly (disambiguation)
- Mallie (disambiguation)
- O'Malley (disambiguation)
