= Maley =

Maley is a surname. Notable people with the surname include:

- Alan Maley (1931–1995), British special effects artist
- Anna A. Maley (1872–1918), American journalist and political activist
- Charles Maley (1876–1929), Australian politician
- David Maley (born 1963), American ice hockey player
- Henry Maley (1878–1956), Australian politician
- James Maley (1908–2007), Scottish political activist
- Jin Maley, American actor
- John Maley (c. 1776–1819), American explorer
- Mark Maley (born 1981), English footballer
- Peggy Maley (1923–2007), American actress
- Tom Maley (1864–1935), Scottish footballer
- Florence Turner-Maley (1871–1962) American composer, singer and teacher
- Wesley Maley (1857–1926), Australian politician
- Willie Maley (1868–1958), Scottish footballer
- Willy Maley (born 1960), Scottish writer

== See also ==
- Maley & Taunton
- O'Malley (disambiguation)
- Malley, a surname
- Mally (disambiguation)
- Maly (disambiguation)
