= Salvemini =

Salvemini (pronounced [salˈvɛːmini]) is an Italian surname. Notable people with the surname include:

- Carlo Salvemini (born 1966), Italian politician, mayor of Lecce
- Dan Salvemini (born 1957), former U.S. soccer player
- Gaetano Salvemini (1873–1957), Italian politician, historian and writer
- Gaetano Salvemini (football manager) (1942–2024), Italian football player and manager
- Giovanni Salvemini (1708–1791), Italian mathematician
  - Frederick Salvemini de Castillon (1747–1814), Swiss-born music theorist, son of Giovanni
- Len Salvemini (born 1953), retired American soccer player
- Michele Salvemini (born 1973), Italian rapper, better known as Caparezza
- Stefania Salvemini (born 1966), Italian basketball player
- Victor Salvemini (1946–2020), Australian Paralympic athlete
