= Len Casanova =

American football player and coach (1905–2002)

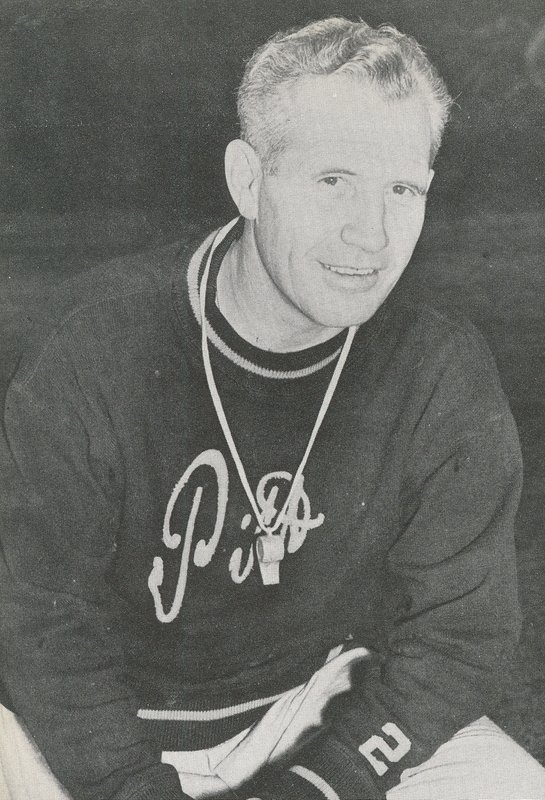
- Casanova from The Owl 1951

Biographical details
- Born: June 12, 1905; Ferndale, California, U.S.
- Died: September 30, 2002 (aged 97); Eugene, Oregon, U.S.

Playing career

Football
- 1923–1926: Santa Clara
- Positions: Halfback, punter

Coaching career (HC unless noted)

Football
- 1927: St. Joseph Mil. Acad. (CA)
- 1928–1935: Sequoia HS (CA)
- 1936–1942: Santa Clara (assistant)
- 1946–1949: Santa Clara
- 1950: Pittsburgh
- 1951–1966: Oregon

Baseball
- 1940–1942: Santa Clara

Administrative career (AD unless noted)
- 1967–1970: Oregon

Head coaching record
- Overall: 104–94–11 (college football); 39–25 (college baseball)
- Bowls: 2–2

Accomplishments and honors

Championships
- Football; 1 PCC (1957)

Awards
- Amos Alonzo Stagg Award (1990)
- College Football Hall of Fame; Inducted in 1977 (profile)

Leonard Joseph Casanova (June 12, 1905 – September 30, 2002) was an American football and baseball player, coach, and college athletics administrator. He served as the head football coach at Santa Clara University (1946–1949), the University of Pittsburgh (1950), and the University of Oregon (1951–1966), compiling a career college football record of 104–94–11. Casanova was also the head baseball coach at Santa Clara from 1940 to 1942, tallying a mark of 39–25. After retiring from coaching, he served as the athletic director at Oregon. Casanova was inducted into the College Football Hall of Fame as a coach in 1977.

== Early life ==
Casanova was born on June 12, 1905 on a ranch in the Grizzly Bluff area near Ferndale, California. His parents were John and Marie Ursula Casanov, Swiss-Americans who had recently immigrated to the United States. He began playing football in the early 1920s when he played halfback for Ferndale High School, and in 1922 he captained the Ferndale team to a co-championship with Eureka High School. The Ferndale team ended the season with seven wins in eight games. One of Casanova's early athletic feats came in the first game that year against Arcata High School when, as a left-footed kicker, he drop-kicked a 45-yard field goal as Ferndale defeated the Tigers, 10–0.

Clark Bugbee, a high school teammate, later recalled that "Cas wanted to be a good punter. The coach gave him a football to take home and practice with. He practiced winter and summer and turned out to be quite a punter in college."

While in high school, Casanova delivered newspapers and worked at a meat market in town. In his senior year, he also played basketball and baseball and was president of the student body. In the 1923 Ferndale High School yearbook, under the column "Expected to Be" in the "Senior Horoscope" section, Casanova listed his future career as "football coach".

== Playing career ==
Casanova entered Santa Clara University in the fall of 1923 and played football and baseball from 1923 through 1927. As a freshman in a game against Stanford, he picked up a fumble and returned it 86 yards for a touchdown.

In 1924, Casanova was playing halfback and punting for Santa Clara. He first made headlines as a player for Santa Clara in 1924 after his heroics in a game against Saint Mary's. A popular rivalry since its origination in 1895, the "Little Big Game" between Santa Clara and Saint Mary's was played annually in front of packed crowds at Kezar Stadium in San Francisco. With the ball resting on the Santa Clara two-yard line, Casanova was called on to punt from his own end zone. He punted a ball that went out of bounds on the Saint Mary's one-yard line. The punt traveled a total of 97 yards and would (as of 2006) rank as the second longest of college football history if pre-1937 statistics were included in the NCAA record book.

Casanova was Santa Clara's team captain in his senior year under coach Adam Walsh, who had played at Notre Dame under Knute Rockne. Casanova graduated in 1927 with a bachelor's degree in philosophy and a minor in history. He attended summer sessions at Santa Clara and obtained his teaching credential in 1932.

Following college graduation, Casanova played one season with the San Francisco Olympic Club team.

== Coaching career ==
=== High school ===
Casanova began his teaching and coaching career in 1927 at St. Joseph Military Academy in Belmont, California. In 1928, he began teaching physical education and coaching football and baseball at Sequoia High School in Redwood City, California. As head football coach at Sequoia High, Casanova's team won the Peninsula Athletic League championship in 1935.

=== Santa Clara ===
In 1936, Casanova became an assistant coach at his alma mater, Santa Clara University, under the legendary "Silver Fox", Buck Shaw. During his first year coaching at Santa Clara, the Broncos defeated LSU in the 1937 Sugar Bowl. The following season, Santa Clara went undefeated, sharing the No. 9 ranking in the AP poll with Notre Dame. The Broncos were invited back to the Sugar Bowl where they again stunned LSU, 6–0. Casanova remained Shaw's assistant until Santa Clara suspended football after the 1942 season on account of World War II. Casanova joined the United States Navy commissioned as a full Lieutenant and was discharged at the end of the war as a full naval Commander. Casanova was also head baseball coach at Santa Clara from 1939 to 1942.

Casanova returned to Santa Clara in 1946 as head football coach. His 1948 team defeated Stanford, tied Michigan State, and posted an upset win over Oklahoma at Kezar Stadium, 20–17. In 1949, the Santa Clara Broncos opened with a disappointing defeat at the hands of the California Golden Bears. Santa Clara then went unbeaten over its next eight games, marred only by a 7–7 tie with Stanford.

After nearly upsetting Oklahoma in Norman, the Broncos were invited to play in the Orange Bowl in Miami. Their opponent was the No. 11-ranked Kentucky Wildcats, coached by Bear Bryant. Bryant, who later became the all-time winningest football coach in collegiate history after moving on to Texas A&M and Alabama, had earlier served under Casanova in the Navy. Kentucky was an overwhelming favorite going into the game. Santa Clara's 19-car train to Miami was known as the "Orange Bowl Special" and it stopped at Yuma, Arizona and Del Rio, Texas to allow the team to hold short practice sessions.

In Miami, Santa Clara scored a monumental upset of Kentucky, 21–13. Santa Clara led 14–13 and scored its final touchdown with thirty seconds remaining in the game. Bryant remarked after the game: "I had better men at my disposal than Casanova had. He got more out of his men than I did."

After the Orange Bowl win, Santa Clara announced that as a cost-cutting measure it was dropping major college football.

=== Pittsburgh ===
In 1950, Casanova was offered the head coaching position at the University of Pittsburgh. He expected to have an experienced team to play a tough schedule that included Notre Dame, Michigan State, and Ohio State. But in June 1950, the Korean War began and most of his players were called into military duty. His depleted ranks were able to gain but one victory in the 1950 season.

=== Oregon ===
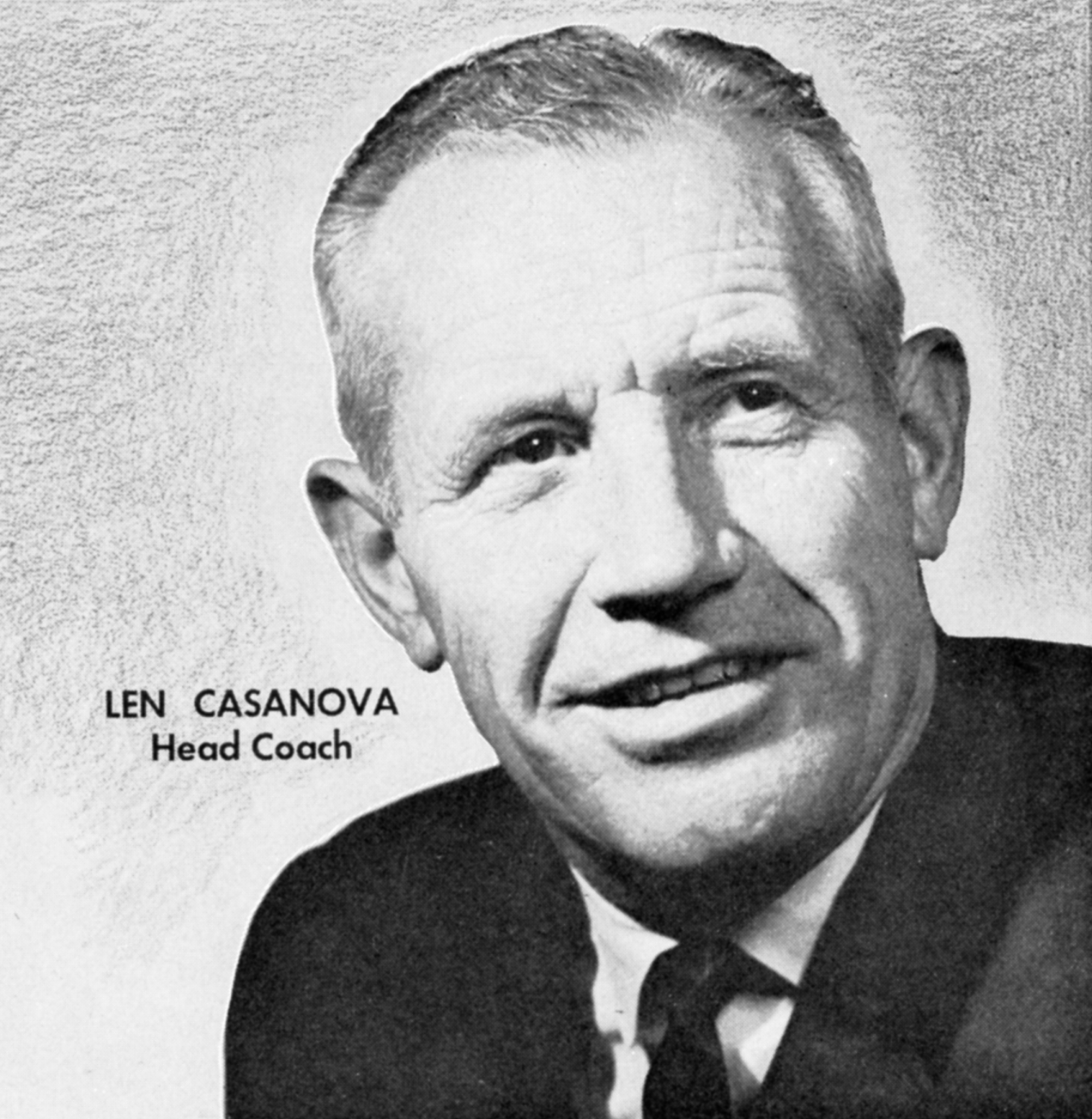
Casanova in 1962

In 1951, Casanova moved on to the University of Oregon and took over a program that had finished 1–9 the previous season. He left as the winningest coach in the school's football history with 82 victories, surpassed by Rich Brooks in 1994.

The Oregon Ducks played in one of the earliest nationally televised games in 1953 against Nebraska, winning 20–12.

Casanova's 1957 team is remembered for beating Stanford in a game in which they had no fumbles, no interceptions, and only one penalty. That team finished its season on New Year's Day with a 10–7 loss to top-ranked Ohio State in the Rose Bowl.

Tabbed for a three touchdown licking, Casanova's Oregon Ducks matched the more numerous and more powerful athletes from the Big Ten Conference out-gaining Ohio State in total yards and first downs. A missed 24-yard field goal and fumble in the fourth quarter cost Oregon the upset victory. Casanova's 1958 team ranked second in the country in scoring defense, allowing an average of just five points a game, and surrendered more than seven points just once during the season.

At Oregon, Casanova coached two future Hall of Famers, Mel Renfro and Dave Wilcox, and helped assistants George Seifert, John McKay, and John Robinson start their own coaching careers.

"He was a mentor to all us, a man who set an example," Robinson said. "And he loved us. He genuinely cared about us as players. He would get on our butt if we didn't go to church, and if you didn't go to school he would darn near punch you out."

In 1964, Casanova served as president of the American Football Coaches Association.

Casanova's Oregon teams struggled in rivalry games, going 4–10–2 (.313) against Oregon State in the Civil War and 3–12–1 (.219) against Washington in that series. He had a slight advantage against Washington State, at 8–7–2 (.529).

== Later life, honors, and death ==
After retiring from coaching in 1966, Casanova served as the Oregon's athletic director from 1967 to 1970 during which time Autzen Stadium was completed. He remained closely associated with the University of Oregon for many years and was active in numerous fundraising efforts and special projects that improved the school's athletic facilities.

From 1969 to 1973, Casanova served on the NCAA football rules committee. He was inducted into the College Football Hall of Fame in 1977 and received the Amos Alonzo Stagg Award in 1990. The award given to the freshman or newcomer of the year on the Oregon football team is named the "Len Casanova Award" in his honor.

In 1991, the University of Oregon in decided that Casanova's distinguished record merited an exception to State Board of Higher Education policy regarding the naming of buildings after living persons. In honor of Casanova's 40 years of contribution to the Ducks' athletic fortunes, Oregon's new athletic department facility was named the Len Casanova Athletic Center.

While still active at age 96 and attending reunions with his former players and coaches, Casanova sat for an interview in 2002 and named some of the highlights of his coaching career:

- Most memorable game: Santa Clara's 1950 Orange Bowl win over Kentucky;
- Most exciting game: Oregon's 1958 Rose Bowl against Ohio State;
- Most memorable players coached: Mel Renfro, Dick James, George Shaw, Hall Haynes, John Hock, Ahmad Rashad, and Dave Wilcox;
- Best coaching opponent: Jim Owens of Washington.

Casanova died following an extended illness on September 30, 2002, at Sheldon Park Assisted Living in Eugene, Oregon. At the time of his death, many Oregonians credited Casanova with building the foundation for Oregon's national status.

"Everything that Oregon athletics is today, it owes to Len Casanova," said Bill Moos, Oregon's athletic director. "He has been the pillar, the strength and the inspiration for our program for over 50 years."

Said Oregon football coach Mike Bellotti after Casanova's death: "We lost a great man. He definitely left his mark not just on the University of Oregon but on football in general."

== Personal life ==
Casanova married Dixie Simmers of Santa Cruz, California on June 12, 1931. Dixie attended San Jose State College and taught kindergarten. They had two daughters. Three years after the passing of Dixie at age 51 on October 17, 1960, Casanova married Margaret Pence Hathaway.

== Head coaching record ==
=== College football ===
Year	Team	Overall	Conference	Standing	Bowl/playoffs	Coaches^{#}	AP^{°}
Santa Clara Broncos (Independent) (1946–1949)
1946	Santa Clara	2–5–1					
1947	Santa Clara	4–4					
1948	Santa Clara	7–2–1					
1949	Santa Clara	8–2–1			W Orange		15
Santa Clara:		21–13–3					
Pittsburgh Panthers (Independent) (1950–present)
1950	Pittsburgh	1–8					
Pittsburgh:		1–8					
Oregon Ducks (Pacific Coast Conference) (1951–1958)
1951	Oregon	2–8	1–6	8th			
1952	Oregon	2–7–1	2–5	T–6th			
1953	Oregon	4–5–1	2–5–1	8th			
1954	Oregon	6–4	5–3	3rd			
1955	Oregon	6–4	4–3	4th			
1956	Oregon	4–4–2	3–3–2	T–4th			
1957	Oregon	7–4	6–2	T–1st	L Rose	17	
1958	Oregon	4–6	4–4	5th			
Oregon Ducks (NCAA University Division independent) (1959–1963)
1959	Oregon	8–2					
1960	Oregon	7–3–1			L Liberty		
1961	Oregon	4–6					
1962	Oregon	6–3–1					
1963	Oregon	8–3			W Sun		
Oregon Ducks (Athletic Association of Western Universities) (1964–1966)
1964	Oregon	7–2–1	1–2–1	T–6th			
1965	Oregon	4–5–1	0–5	8th			
1966	Oregon	3–7	1–3	T–6th			
Oregon:		82–73–8	29–41–4				
Total:		104–94–11					
National championship Conference title Conference division title or championship game berth
^{#}Rankings from final Coaches Poll.; ^{°}Rankings from final AP Poll.
