= Mally =

Mally may refer to:

- Mally Beauty, U.S. makeup company
- 1179 Mally, (formerly 1931 FD) asteroid named after Mally Wolf, the daughter-in-law of its discoverer Max Wolf

== People ==
- Ernst Mally (1879–1944), Austrian philosopher
- Franziska Mally (born 1916), Austrian swimmer
- Komlan Mally (born 1960), former Tongolese Prime Minister
- Remo Mally (born 1991), Austrian soccer player
- Mally Roncal (born 1972), American makeup artist
- Mally (born 1983), Japanese drummer for Exist Trace

== See also ==
- Jamal (rapper) (born 1978) -- also called "Mally G"
- O'Malley (disambiguation)
- Malley
- Maley
- Maly (disambiguation)
