= George Malley (American football) =

American football coach (1903–1979)

Biographical details
- Born: February 10, 1903; Arizona, U.S.
- Died: August 14, 1979 (aged 76); Anaheim, California, U.S.

Playing career

Football
- 1922–1925: Santa Clara

Basketball
- 1923–1926: Santa Clara
- Position: End (football)

Coaching career (HC unless noted)

Football
- 1929–1935: St. Ignatius College Prep (CA)
- 1936: San Francisco (backfield)
- 1937–1940: San Francisco

Head coaching record
- Overall: 14–16–6 (college)

George Leo Malley (February 10, 1903 – August 14, 1979) was an American football coach. He served as the head coach of the San Francisco Dons at the University of San Francisco from 1937 to 1940. Before that, he had success as a high school football coach at St. Ignatius High School from 1929 to 1935.

== Biography ==
Malley, whose grandfather was an Irish immigrant, was born in Arizona and attended Santa Clara University, where he played college football. He served as the team captain in the early 1920s. Malley earned a Bachelor of Philosophy and a Bachelor of Laws.

He then coached football at St. Ignatius High School beginning in 1929. He also served on the faculty at the school and taught civics and sociology. St. Ignatius went undefeated from September 1937 until December 1939, when they were finally beaten by Loyola High School of Los Angeles, 12–7, in the California state Catholic prep school championship. The success of Malley's teams prompted the school to promote the program back to the AAA level. In 1934, the San Francisco Chronicle compared his 1935 team to Notre Dame under Knute Rockne:

"Today in San Francisco is an unsung, unnoted football team that embodies about everything that Notre Dame teams of years ago stood for—rambling, fight and Irish—and undefeated records. That team belongs to St. Ignatius High School. The Ignatians ramble over California a bit, next year they may even trek to Reno; Irish names dominate the lineup and the record is clean—not even one point is tabbed for opponents."

Malley moved on to the University of San Francisco in 1936 to serve as an assistant football coach under Spud Lewis. He succeeded Lewis as head football coach following the 1936 season. Malley could not extend his interscholastic success to the college level, however. At the University of San Francisco, he amassed an 14–16–6 record during his tenure from 1937 to 1940. In 1939, a San Francisco newspaper article before the game against Loyola had a headline quote that referred to Malley's worries over the hot weather conditions his team would face in Los Angeles. A San Jose Evening News writer sardonically noted that, with Malley's extensive bad luck on the football field, "the heat may be on from several sources!" Malley resigned as San Francisco head coach in February 1941.

Malley died on August 14, 1979.

Malley was named among the "Legends of USF Athletics" in 2005. His son, Pat Malley, coached football at Santa Clara University from 1959 to 1984. His grandson, Terry Malley, succeeded Pat Malley as Santa Clara head coach.

== Head coaching record ==
=== College ===
Year	Team	Overall	Conference	Standing	Bowl/playoffs
San Francisco Dons (Independent) (1937–1940)
1937	San Francisco	4–5–1			
1938	San Francisco	5–2–1			
1939	San Francisco	4–3–3			
1940	San Francisco	1–6–1			
San Francisco:		14–16–6			
Total:		14–16–6			
