= O'Malley =

O'Malley may refer to:

- O'Malley (surname), a surname (including a list of people with the name)
- O'Malley, Australian Capital Territory, a suburb of Canberra
- US FWS Henry O'Malley, a research vessel in commission in the United States Fish and Wildlife Service from 1949 to 1951
- Ó Máille clan or Kings of Umaill, an Irish clan name anglicized as O'Malley

== See also ==
- Malley
- Maley
- Mally (disambiguation)
- Maly (disambiguation)
