= St. Ignatius College Preparatory =

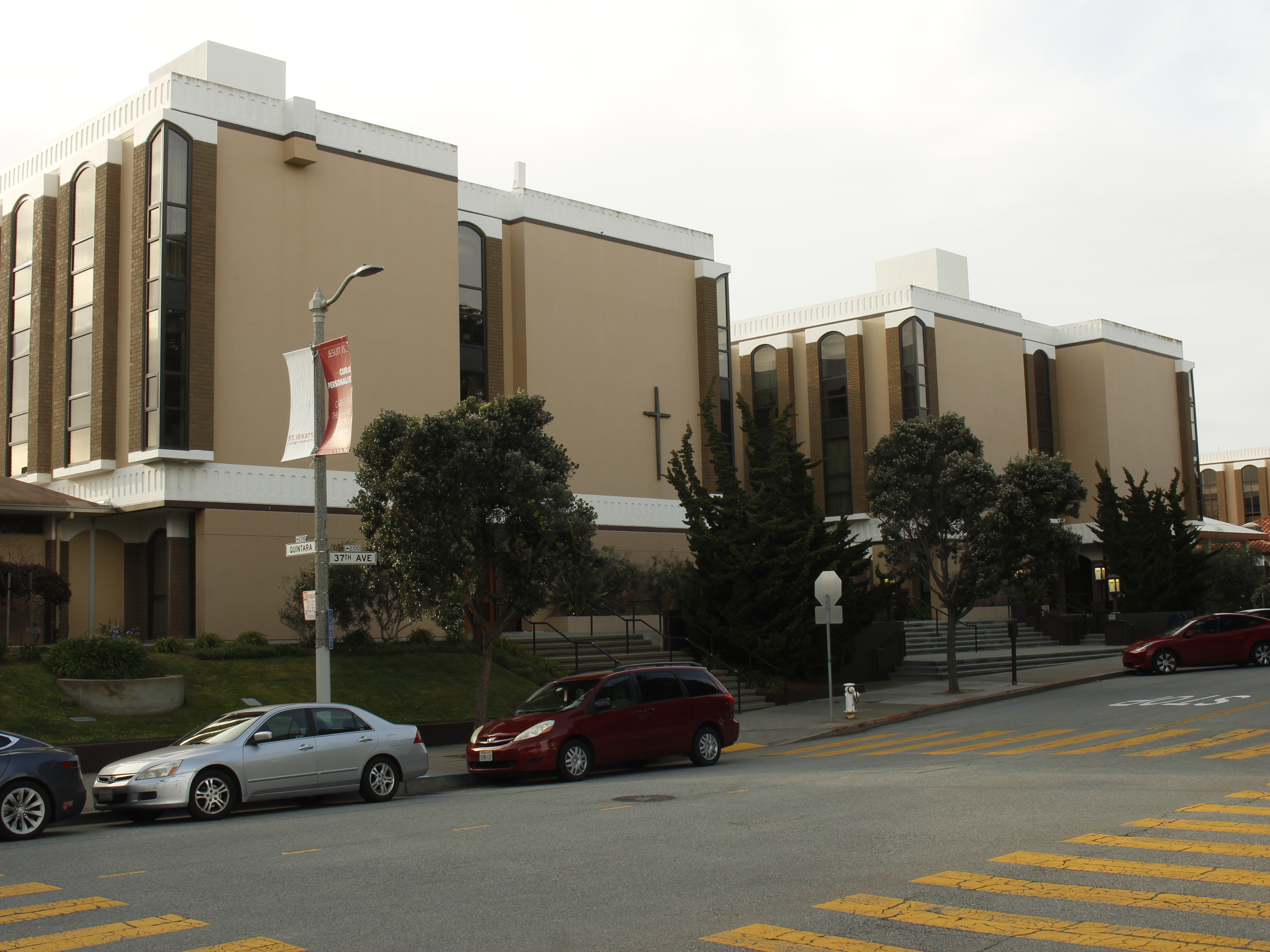
- SI's main building in 2024

Location
- 2001 37th Avenue; San Francisco, California 94116; 37°44′54″N 122°29′46″W

Information
- Former name: St. Ignatius High School
- Type: Private Catholic Non-profit Coeducational college-prep education institution
- Motto: Ad Majorem Dei Gloriam (For the Greater Glory of God)
- Religious affiliation: Catholic (Jesuit)
- Established: 1855; 171 years ago
- Founder: Anthony Maraschi
- President: Joseph Vollert
- Grades: 9 - 12
- Gender: Coeducational
- Enrollment: 1,505 (2021-2022)
- Campus type: Urban
- Colors: Red & blue
- Athletics conference: West Catholic Athletic League
- Mascot: Wildcats
- Rival: Sacred Heart Cathedral Preparatory
- Publication: The Quill (literary); Genesis (alumni)
- Newspaper: Inside SI
- Yearbook: The Ignatian
- Endowment: $73 million (2017)
- Tuition: $32,950 (2024-2025)
- Website: siprep.org

St. Ignatius College Preparatory, colloquially referred to by Bay Area locals as SI, is a private, Catholic preparatory school in the Jesuit tradition, serving the San Francisco Bay Area since 1855. Located in the Archdiocese of San Francisco, in the Sunset District of San Francisco, St. Ignatius is one of the oldest secondary schools in the U.S. state of California.

== History ==
St. Ignatius was founded as a one-room schoolhouse on Market Street by Anthony Maraschi, a Jesuit priest, just after the California Gold Rush in 1855. Maraschi paid $11,000 for the property which was to become the original church and schoolhouse. The church opened on July 15, 1855, and three months later, on October 15, the school opened its doors to its first students.

SI was the high school division of what later became the University of San Francisco, but it has since split from the university and changed locations five times due to the growth of the student body and natural disaster. In the 1860s, the school built a new site, adjacent to the first, on Market Street in downtown San Francisco. In 1880, SI moved its campus to a location on Van Ness Avenue in the heart of San Francisco, and by 1883, SI had become the largest Jesuit school in the nation.

Within 26 years of the relocation, however, St. Ignatius would be completely destroyed. Though the school would survive the tremors of the 1906 earthquake with only moderate damage, the subsequent fires destroyed the school and church, forcing SI to find a new location near Golden Gate Park, a hastily constructed "temporary" wooden building, affectionately known as the "Shirt Factory", which housed the school from 1906 to 1929.

In 1927, the high school was separated from the university, becoming St. Ignatius High School. Two years later, SI relocated its campus once more, this time to Stanyan Street, where it remained for 40 years. In the fall of 1969, Father Harry Carlin moved SI to its current Sunset District campus, whereupon the current name, St. Ignatius College Preparatory, was adopted.

Though founded as an all-boys school, SI became coeducational in 1989 and is now home to over 1,500 male and female students. The school celebrated its 150th anniversary in 2005.

== Academics and student body ==
St. Ignatius offers 4 accelerated, 27 honors, and 14 Advanced Placement classes.

1,505 high school and 75 middle school students were enrolled in 2022–2023, with the student to teacher ratio being 16 to 1.

The current diversity in 2022-2023 is:

- 45% White
- 5% Latino
- 17% Asian
- 3% Black
- 23% Multiracial
- 1% Pacific Islander
- 1% Native American/Alaskan
- 5% Did Not Report

== Athletics ==
The school has 66 athletic teams with over 70% of students participating. The Wildcats generally participate in the Western Catholic Athletic League (WCAL) in the Central Coast Section (CCS) of California, though for some sports, the teams belong to other leagues.

The men's rowing team of St. Ignatius has seen the most national success out of any athletic program at the school, as it has won a total of three US Rowing Youth National Championships in 1997, 2005, and 2006. In addition, the crew competed in the Henley Royal Regatta in England, where it won the prestigious Princess Elizabeth Challenge Cup in 2006. More recently, the varsity men's team placed 4th in the SRAA National Championship under the Boys Junior 8+ category in 2022, and won the event in 2024. The team has also recently returned to Youth Nationals in 2023 and 2024, competing in the Men's U16 8+ in the former, and the Men's U17 8+ and Women's U17 8+ in the latter.

The SI men's lacrosse team won the state championship and was ranked nationally in 2008, 2013, 2015, 2017, and 2022. The Cats have won the WCAL Championship 14 years in a row. In 2017 the Wildcats finished ranked number 5 nationally with a 19–2 record, beating number 6 ranked Chaminade, NY and number 14 ranked Gonzaga, D.C. St. Ignatius has a powerhouse lacrosse program, known nationwide for sending student-athletes to Ivy League and ACC schools.

The SI women's lacrosse team has historically seen success as well, winning the WCAL title for five years straight from 1997 to 2001. The team also won CCS in 2022 and ended the season as the 12th best in the country.

The SI men's soccer team has been nationally ranked by ESPN. The boys won the WCAL championship in 2009, 2010, 2011, 2017, 2018, and 2019, and the CCS championship in 2009, 2017, and 2018. They won the inaugural Northern California championship in 2018 and were ranked number 2 nationally to end the season.

The SI football team were WCAL champions in 1967, 2006, and 2019, as well as CCS Division III champions in 2006 and 2011. In 2012 SI placed first in the WCAL and competed in the CCS Division I playoffs. In 2024 SI were co-WCAL champions and CCS Open division champions.

The SI men's swim team placed 3rd in CCS Div I and the 200 Freestyle relay team broke the CCS Record in prelims and then was ranked 10th nationally in the All-American rankings in 2014. In 2015, the men placed 4th in CCS Div I with a CCS championship in the 200 Freestyle, and also placed 6th at the Inaugural California State Championship. In 2017, the men placed 6th in CCS Div I with a CCS championship in the 200 Freestyle relay.

The SI women's swim team has seen much success in the WCAL Championship in recent years, with the varsity team winning in 2007 and 2019 and the junior varsity team winning in 2005, 2006, 2007, 2017, 2018, and 2019. In both 2007 and 2008, the women placed 4th in CCS Div I with a CCS championship in the 200 Medley relay. In 2022, the women placed first in CCS Div I, with CCS Championships in the 200 Medley relay, 100 Butterfly, and 200 Freestyle relay, with the 200 Medley and 200 Freestyle relay teams qualifying for the National Interscholastic Swim Coaches Association (NISCA) All American.

=== Rivalry with Sacred Heart Cathedral ===
St. Ignatius' traditional rival is Sacred Heart Cathedral Preparatory, also located in San Francisco. The SI–SHC rivalry began with a rugby game on St. Patrick's Day in 1893. SI and SHC compete against each other in football, basketball, baseball, and volleyball for the Bruce-Mahoney Trophy, which is named after naval airman, Bill Bruce '35 of St. Ignatius, and Jerry Mahoney of Sacred Heart Cathedral, both alumni who died in World War II. All-time, SI has dominated over SHC, with a winning record of 55-20-3 for the trophy.

== Notable alumni ==
- Jeremiah F. Sullivan – Associate Justice of the Supreme Court of California
- Stephen M. White – United States Senator from California from 1893 to 1899 (attended, did not graduate)
- Edward John O'Dea – Bishop of Seattle (attended, did not graduate)
- John Joseph Montgomery, 1873 – aviation pioneer
- Joseph Richard Slevin – second curator of herpetology at the California Academy of Sciences
- Charles H. Strub, 1902 – dentist and sports entrepreneur
- Francis Joseph McCarty – experimenter
- Daniel J. Callaghan, 1907 – United States Navy admiral, Medal of Honor recipient
- Dutch Ruether – MLB player, pitcher in three World Series
- Frederic B. Butler, 1913 – United States Army general
- William Callaghan, 1914 – United States Navy admiral, first commanding officer of USS Missouri (BB-63)
- Joseph Kurihara – Japanese American internee who renounced his American citizenship (attended, did not graduate)
- Raymond L. Sullivan, 1924 – Associate Justice of the Supreme Court of California
- Joseph E. Tinney, 1927 – attorney and politician
- André Laguerre – managing editor of Sports Illustrated from 1960 to 1974
- Richard Egan, 1939 – actor
- Rene Herrerias, 1944 – college basketball player and head coach
- Ivan L. Slavich Jr., 1945 – United States Army colonel
- Jim Mangan, 1946 – MLB catcher
- Joe McNamee, 1946 – NBA player
- John Jay O'Connor, 1947 – lawyer and husband of former Supreme Court Justice Sandra Day O'Connor
- George Moscone, 1947 – 37th Mayor of San Francisco
- Leo T. McCarthy, 1948 – 43rd Lieutenant Governor of California
- William H. Briare, 1948 – 18th Mayor of Las Vegas
- Bradford Dillman, 1949 – actor
- Pat Malley, 1949 – college football player at Santa Clara University, head coach and athletic director
- John Paul Getty Jr. – philanthropist (attended, did not graduate)
- Gordon Getty, 1951 – businessman and composer
- George Stanley, 1951 – award-winning poet and member of the San Francisco Renaissance
- Jerry Brown, 1955 – 34th and 39th Governor of California
- Fred LaCour, 1956 – professional basketball player
- Adrian Buoncristiani, 1958 – college basketball coach
- Paul Pelosi – businessman and husband of Nancy Pelosi (attended, did not graduate)
- Dan Fitzgerald, 1959 – college basketball coach and athletic director at Gonzaga University
- Gil Haskell, 1961 – football coach, offensive coordinator for the Seattle Seahawks from 2000 to 2008
- Mike Nevin, 1961 – politician
- James F. O'Connell, 1961 – Distinguished Professor Emeritus of Anthropology at the University of Utah
- Tim Tierney, 1961 – college football player and coach
- Abe Jacob, 1962 – sound designer and audio engineer
- Al Saunders, 1964 – academic All-American football player at San Jose State University, NFL head coach for the San Diego Chargers
- Charles Parks, 1964 – professional basketball player
- Bob Portman, 1965 – college basketball player at Creighton University, NBA player, forward for the Golden State Warriors
- Laurence Yep, 1966 – author
- Robert Francis Christian, O.P., 1966 – auxiliary bishop of the Archdiocese of San Francisco
- Marshall Kilduff, 1967 – investigative reporter
- Paul Otellini, 1968 – President and CEO of Intel
- Dan Fouts, 1969 – NFL player, quarterback for the San Diego Chargers, NFL Hall of Fame, six time Pro Bowler
- Gerald Posner, 1971 – investigative journalist
- Len Salvemini, 1971 – professional soccer player
- Mark Stahl, 1971 – professional soccer player
- Kevin Shelley, 1973 – California Secretary of State from 2003 to 2005
- Dan Salvemini, 1975 – professional soccer player and member of 1980 US Olympic team
- Kevin Rodney Sullivan, 1976 – film and television actor and director
- James Houghton, 1976 – Director of Drama at the Juilliard School
- Kevin V. Ryan, 1976 – United States Attorney for the Northern District of California from 2002 to 2007
- Eugene Gloria, 1977 – poet
- Bartlett Sher, 1977 – Tony Award-winning stage director, known for directing the 2008 Broadway revival of South Pacific
- Anthony Cistaro, 1981 – actor
- Francis Jue, 1981 – actor
- Luke Brugnara, 1981 – businessman, casino mogul
- Jonathan Moscone, 1982 – theater director
- Robert Hewitt Wolfe, 1983 – television producer and screenwriter
- Luke Brugnara, 1983 – commercial real estate investor and developer
- Derek Lam, 1984 – fashion designer
- Levy Middlebrooks, 1984 – professional basketball player
- Stephen McFeely, 1987 – screenwriter and producer
- Al Madrigal, 1989 – comedian, writer, actor, and producer
- Mark Farrell, 1992 – 44th Mayor of San Francisco
- John Ternus, 1993 - engineer and business leader, currently CEO at Apple, Inc
- Gwendoline Yeo, 1994 – Singaporean actress
- Anthony Buich, 1996 – professional football player
- Dan Kaminsky, 1996 – computer security researcher
- Beth Spotswood, 1996 – writer
- Adam Jacobs, 1997 – actor, singer
- Igor Olshansky, 2000 – NFL player, defensive lineman for the Miami Dolphins
- Luke Whitehead – professional basketball player (attended, did not graduate)
- Honey Mahogany, 2002 – activist, politician, drag performer, and singer
- Darren Criss, 2005 – musician, actor, singer-songwriter, and composer
- Jeff Cosgriff, 2006 – professional soccer player
- Jill Costello, 2006 – activist for lung cancer awareness and research
- Molly McGrath, 2007 – sportscaster and studio host at ESPN
- Steven Zhu, 2007 – professional DJ and singer
- Zac Lee, 2005 – professional football player
- Eleanor Columbus, 2007 – film producer
- Jamize Olawale, 2008 – NFL player, fullback for the Dallas Cowboys
- Paul Toboni, 2008 – President of Baseball Operations for the Washington Nationals
- Brendan Daly, 2009 – professional rugby player
- Colin Woodell, 2010 – actor
- Nicholas Miller, 2009 – professional DJ (ILLENIUM)
- Jacqueline Toboni, 2010 – actress
- Matt Krook, 2013 – MLB player, pitcher for the New York Yankees
- Andrew Vollert, 2013 – NFL player, tight end for 5 NFL teams
- Teddye Buchanan, 2020 – NFL player, linebacker for the Baltimore Ravens
- Beau Gardner, 2020 – College football player, long snapper for the Georgia Bulldogs

== See also ==
- San Francisco high schools
