= Gary Hoffman (tackle) =

American football player (born 1961)

No. 78
- Position: Offensive tackle

Personal information
- Born: September 28, 1961 (age 65); Sacramento, California, U.S.
- Listed height: 6 ft 7 in (2.01 m)
- Listed weight: 285 lb (129 kg)

Career information
- High school: Christian Brothers (Sacramento)
- College: Santa Clara (1979–1983)
- NFL draft: 1984: 10th round, 267th overall pick

Career history
- Green Bay Packers (1984); San Francisco 49ers (1987)

Career NFL statistics
- Games played: 4
- Stats at Pro Football Reference

Gary Edward Hoffman (born September 28, 1961) is an American former professional football player who was an offensive tackle in the National Football League (NFL). He played college football for the Santa Clara Broncos, earning first-team Little All-American honors. He was selected by the Green Bay Packers in the 10th round of the 1984 NFL draft and appeared in one game for them that year before being released. He later played for the San Francisco 49ers in 1987 as a replacement player during the 1987 NFL strike.

== Early life and college ==
Hoffman was born on September 28, 1961, in Sacramento, California. He attended Christian Brothers High School in Sacramento and enrolled at Santa Clara University in 1979.

Hoffman played for the Santa Clara Broncos football team as an offensive lineman, after having initially been a defensive end. Standing 6 feet 7 inches (2.01 m) and weighing 270 pounds (120 kg), he was the largest player on the team. As a sophomore in 1980, he was thrust into a starting role for their NCAA Division II playoff game against Northern Michigan due to eligibility issues with Hugh Lovelace, the team MVP. He played a key role in their upset victory over the Wildcats and coach Pat Malley called him the "surprise of the game". Hoffman then became starting offensive tackle for the Broncos in 1981. He was named team captain, serving three years in the position, and was the first underclassman ever to receive the honor at Santa Clara.

Hoffman helped Santa Clara to the Western Football Conference championship and a 6–4 record as a senior in 1983. He was named first-team All-Western Football Conference and first-team Little All-American by the Associated Press for his performance. He helped Santa Clara to a total of 24 wins in his collegiate career, gaining a reputation as a "ferocious competitor and a tireless worker" and being "one of the best tackles in Bronco history". He was inducted into the Santa Clara Broncos Hall of Fame in 2003.

== Professional career ==
Hoffman was selected by the Green Bay Packers in the 10th round (267th overall) of the 1984 NFL draft. At the time of his selection, he was working as a bartender; after being picked, he offered to buy drinks for everyone there. The Packers decided to pay the cost of the drinks, in what The Peninsula Times Tribune called "one of the more unusual bonuses proffers by an NFL team". He was also selected by the San Antonio Gunslingers in the 1984 USFL draft, though he stayed with the Packers. However, he was placed on injured reserve prior to the regular season due to an injury to his retina. Hoffman was activated prior to the season finale against the Minnesota Vikings and appeared in the game as a backup.

Hoffman was released by the Packers on September 2, 1985. He signed with the San Francisco 49ers on January 9, 1986, but was then released on August 12. During this time, he operated a "popular hangout" at Santa Clara, called "The Bronco Hut". In September 1987, he was preparing to open a restaurant at Santa Clara when he was asked by the 49ers to play as a replacement player during the 1987 NFL strike. After signing on September 24, 1987, he appeared in three games as a backup before being released on October 19, at the end of the strike, which ended his professional career.
