= Mallie =

Mallie may refer to:

- Augusto S. Mallié (1872–1929), Argentine historian and archivist
- Richard Mallié (born 1948), French politician
- Maldwyn Mallie Hughes (1921–1995), Canadian ice hockey player
- Mallie, Kentucky, United States, an unincorporated community
- Mallie, a Shetland dialect name for the northern fulmar

== See also ==
- Mallie's Sports Grill & Bar, a restaurant, sports grill, and bar in Southgate, Michigan, United States
- Raymond J. DeMallie (born 1946), American anthropologist
- Malley
