= Mount Carmel High School (Los Angeles) =

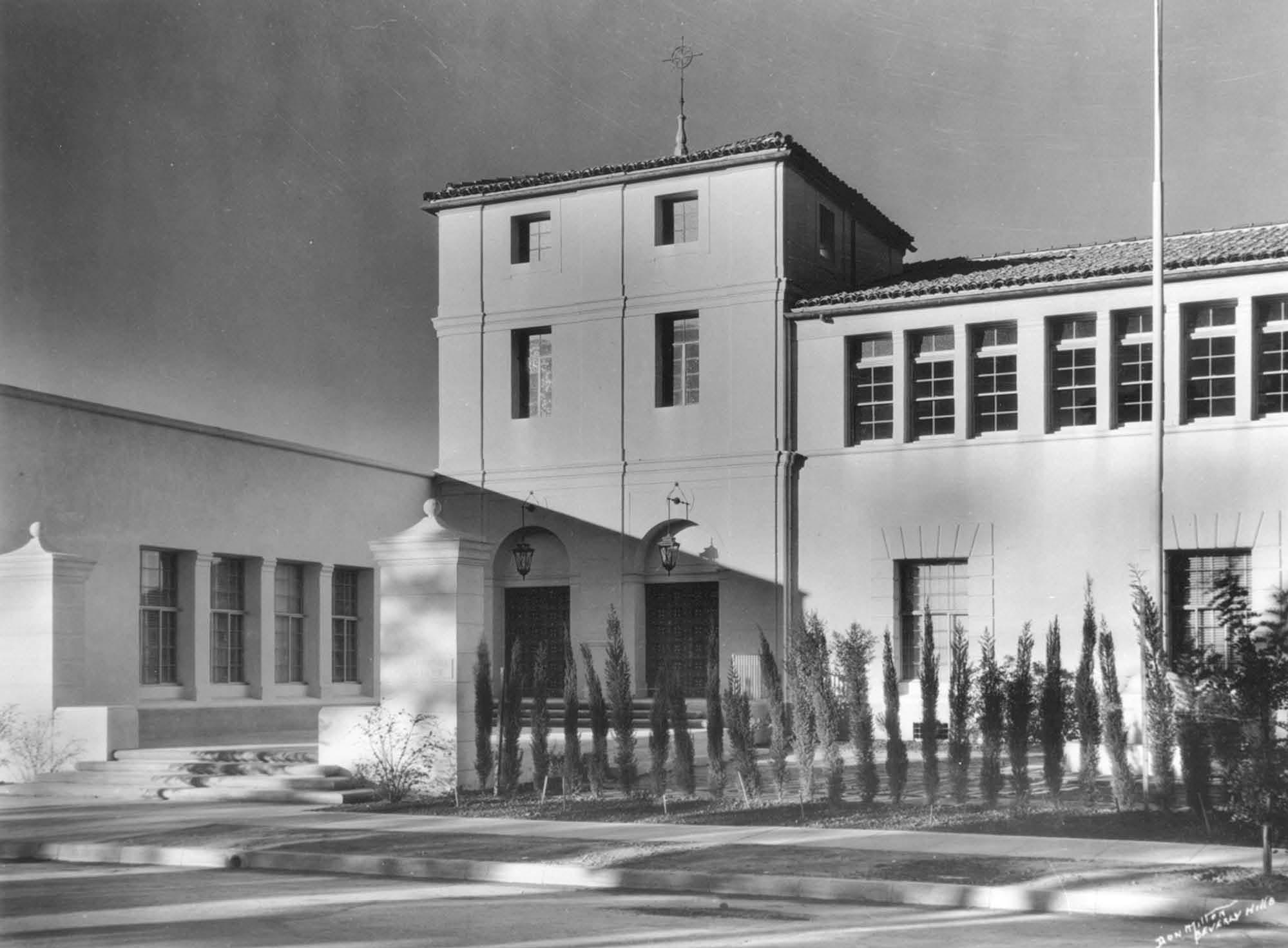
- A view of Mount Carmel High School

Location
- 7011 South Hoover Street; Los Angeles, California 90044; USA

Information
- School type: private
- Patron saint: St. Elijah
- Founded: 1935
- Status: Closed
- Closed: 1976
- Gender: All-Boys
- Campus type: urban
- Team name: Crusaders

Los Angeles Historic-Cultural Monument
- Designated: 1979
- Reference no.: 214

Mount Carmel High School was a Catholic all-boys' high school located in Los Angeles, in the U.S. state of California. It was located in the Archdiocese of Los Angeles. It was founded by the Carmelite Order in 1935. The school closed in 1976, and was demolished in 1983. The school was designated a Los Angeles Historic-Cultural Monument in 1979.

== History ==
The school was built in the Spanish Colonial Revival style, and was the first school in Los Angeles constructed subject to the new seismic building code which came about in the aftermath of the 1933 Long Beach earthquake. The name of the school is in reference to Mount Carmel, the mountain range in northern Israel where, according to Biblical tradition, the prophet Elijah rebuilt an altar. Although classes had begun in November 1934, the school wasn't officially dedicated until 1935 by Bishop John Cantwell. At one time the school served boys from 40 parishes in the Los Angeles Archdiocese.

Father Gus Carter, class of 1942, returned in 1952 and became athletic director. He would leave Mount Carmel in 1959 to found Crespi Carmelite High School in Encino.

The Carmelites announced in 1976 that the school would be closed due to declining enrollment. Enrollment had fallen to 276 students from 600 in the early 1960s. Parents organized a petition drive to prevent closure of the school but their efforts proved unsuccessful.

The 1979 film Rock 'n' Roll High School, featuring the Ramones, used the school campus as a filming location. The school was blown up at the end of the movie.

The Mt. Carmel Alumni Association is still active. It awards scholarships through a foundation to students of Catholic schools in Los Angeles. In addition the association sponsors an annual golf tournament which raises funds for retired Carmelite priests.

== Athletics ==
The Crusaders competed in the California Interscholastic Federation (CIF). Some of their rivals were Loyola High School and Cathedral High School. The 1947 and 1954 basketball teams won the Southern Section championship, and were runners up in 1957.

== Notable alumni ==
- Kermit Alexander, played in the National Football League
- Orlando Ferrante, played in the National Football League
- John Helwig, played in the National Football League
- Jerry Hennessy, played in the National Football League
- John Hock, played in the National Football League
- Melvin Jackson, played in the National Football League
- Marlin McKeever, played in the National Football League
- Mike McKeever, inductee College Football Hall of Fame
- Jeff McIntyre, played in the National Football League
- Karl Rubke, played in the National Football League

== See also ==
- Crespi Carmelite High School
- List of Los Angeles Historic-Cultural Monuments in South Los Angeles
