= 1948 All-Pacific Coast football team =

American all-star college football team

The 1948 All-Pacific Coast football team consists of American football players chosen by various organizations for All-Pacific Coast teams for the 1948 college football season. The organizations selecting these teams included the conference coaches, the Associated Press (AP), and the United Press (UP).

== All-Pacific Coast selections ==
=== Quarterback ===
- Norm Van Brocklin, Oregon (Coaches-1; AP-1; UP-1) (College and Pro Football Halls of Fame)
- Stan Heath, Nevada (AP-2)
- Ray Nagel, UCLA (UP-2)

=== Halfbacks ===
- Jack Swaner, California (Coaches-1; AP-1; UP-1)
- Don Doll, UCLA (AP-1; UP-1)
- Jerry Williams, Washington State (Coaches-1; AP-2; UP-2)
- Don Samuel, Oregon State (AP-2; UP-2)
- Hall Haynes, Santa Clara (AP-2)
- Eddie LeBaron, Pacific (AP-3)
- Ken Carpenter, Oregon State (AP-3)
- Ernie Johnson, UCLA (AP-3)

=== Fullback ===
- Jackie Jensen, California (Coaches-1; AP-1; UP-1)
- E. Mitchell, Stanford (AP-3; UP-2)

=== Ends ===
- Bud Van Deren, California (Coaches-1; AP-2; UP-1)
- Dick Wilkins, Oregon (AP-1; UP-1)
- Dan Garza, Oregon (Coaches-1; AP-2; UP-2)
- Ellery Williams, Santa Clara (AP-1)
- Fran Polsfoot, Washington State (AP-3; UP-2)
- Bob Stillwell, USC (AP-3)

=== Tackles ===
- Laurie Niemi, Washington State (Coaches-1; AP-1; UP-1)
- Jim Turner, California (Coaches-1; AP-1; UP-2)
- Bill Austin, Oregon State (AP-2; UP-1)
- Gene Frassetto, California (AP-3; UP-2)
- Gordon White, Stanford (AP-2)
- Don Stanton, Oregon (AP-3)

=== Guards ===
- Alf Hemstead, Washington (Coaches-1; AP-1; UP-2)
- Rod Franz, California (Coaches-1; AP-1) (College Football Hall of Fame)
- Jon Baker, California (AP-2; UP-1)
- Bob Levenhagen, Washington (AP-3; UP-1)
- Vern Sterling, Santa Clara (AP-2)
- Steiners, UCLA (UP-2)
- Bob Bastian, USC (AP-3)

=== Centers ===
- Brad Ecklund, Oregon (Coaches-1 [center/linebacker]; AP-1; UP-1)
- Boyd Hachten, USC (AP-2)
- James Castagnoli, Stanford (UP-2)
- Bill McGovern, Washington (AP-3)

== Key ==
Coaches = selected by the conference coaches and announced by Pacific Coast Conference Commissioner

AP = Associated Press, "named by sports writer and football coaches from all parts of the far west"

UP = United Press: "All selections were made through the co-operation of sports writers, the athletic departments of each school in the conference and coaches and their assistants"

Bold = Consensus first-team selection of the coaches, AP and UP

== See also ==
- 1948 College Football All-America Team
