= Ivan L. Slavich Jr. =

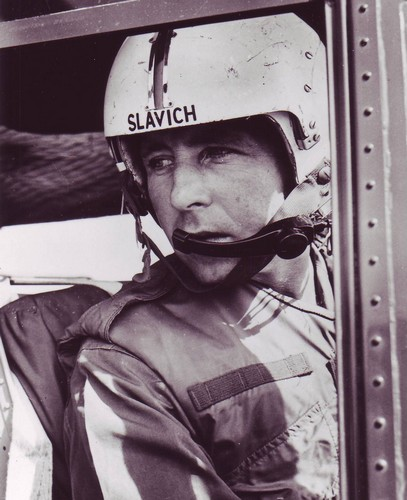
- Slavich in 1963
- Born: September 9, 1927; San Francisco, California, U.S.
- Died: October 20, 2012 (aged 85); Marco Island, Florida, U.S.
- Military career
- Allegiance: United States of America
- Branch: United States Marine Corps; United States Army
- Service years: 1945–1947 (U.S. Marine Corps); 1951-1975 (U.S. Army)
- Rank: Colonel
- Nickname: "Drivin' Ivan"
- Units: 27th Infantry Regiment; 503rd Infantry Regiment; Utility Tactical Transport Company (UTT); 2nd Infantry Division; 82nd Airborne Division; 3rd Brigade, 8th Infantry Division; U.S. Army Readiness Division
- Conflicts: World War II; Korean War; Vietnam War
- Awards: Legion of Merit (3 awards) (Note: Slavich was awarded a fourth Legion of Merit the day he retired from the U.S. Army; however, that award was not noted in his DD-214.); Distinguished Flying Cross; Bronze Star; Air Medal (5 awards); Army Commendation Medal (2 awards)

Ivan L. Slavich Jr. (September 9, 1927 – October 20, 2012) was a United States Army colonel who helped pioneer the use of the HU-1A "Huey" helicopter as a tactical close-in support assault ship, and commanded the first armed combat helicopter unit in American military history. He served in World War II, the Korean War, and the Vietnam War; his military service also included an early enlistment in the U.S. Marine Corps.

Slavich served from 1951 to 1975 as a U.S. Army officer. He served from 1945 to 1947 as an enlisted U.S. Marine.

== Early life and education ==
Slavich was born on September 9, 1927, in San Francisco, California. His father, Ivan Slavich, Sr., was the Clerk of the San Francisco Municipal Court and a Democratic ward politician, and his mother, Mary Foley, hailed from Ireland. His grandfather was a Croatian barrel maker in the California wine country. He grew up in San Francisco, attending the St. Ignatius College Preparatory School and the University of San Francisco where he graduated in 1951 with a Bachelor of Science degree. Other educational accomplishments include a master's degree in business administration from George Washington University, and an advanced degree in administrative management from Harvard University. He was married three times.

== Military service ==
Slavich's military career began in 1945 when he was drafted into the United States Marine Corps after graduating from high school. After serving his enlistment, he attended the University of San Francisco under U.S. Army ROTC, serving as a reserve second lieutenant from February 1950. He received his commission as an infantry second lieutenant in the Regular Army in 1951 upon his graduation. Slavich attended Basic Infantry training at Fort Benning, Georgia, and then reported to Korea for assignment as an infantry platoon leader and company commander with the 27th Infantry Regiment, 25th Infantry Division. Following the Korean War, he returned to Fort Benning for advanced infantry training, serving first as an aide-de-camp and then as a parachuting instructor with the airborne department.

=== Vietnam War ===
==== HU-1A/UH-1B Counter-Insurgency ====
After earning his wings for fixed-wing and helicopter at the U.S. Army Aviation School at Fort Rucker, Alabama, Slavich was deployed to Okinawa with the 503rd Infantry Regiment. In 1960, while stationed in Okinawa, then Major Slavich discovered a detachment of 12 HU-1A "Huey" support helicopters. He formed a company, and worked to arm the helicopters as the French had armed theirs during the Algerian War in the late 1950s. The goal was to prove that the HU-1A (and later, UH-1B) helicopters could be sufficiently armed to provide effective close-in tactical support for troop-carrying ships. Armed with four 7.62-millimeter machine guns and two rocket pods, each with eight rockets, all mounted outside the helicopter just above the skids, the firepower of the HU-1A exceeded that carried by World War II fighter planes.

These "makeshift killers", armed with homemade rocket mounts and machine gun brackets, ultimately attracted the attention of the Pentagon. With the help of General Earle Wheeler, head of the Joint Chiefs of Staff, Slavich and his men were finally able to test their experiment in combat. The unit was first deployed to Thailand, and then in 1962, the testing ground was moved to the battlefield when Slavich took command of the newly formed Utility Tactical Transport Company (UTT) in Vietnam. The UTT was tasked with providing close-in battlefield support to the dual-rotor H-21 troop carriers. By flying in formation with the troop carriers and employing a unique circular daisy chain pattern at the landing zone so that each Huey was covered by the one immediately behind it, five to six Hueys were able to protect up to 30 H-21 troop carriers at one time.

Under Slavich's command, the UTT quickly earned a reputation for "innovative use of helicopter-borne firepower, finely honed aviator skills, and aggressive support of the ground soldier". Slavich and his men again and again proved that the highly maneuverable and extremely tactical Huey gunships were far superior to fixed-wing aircraft when it came to the kind of close-in support that was required for a Southeast Asian battlefield, especially when lines often blurred between enemy camp and civilian village. Unlike fixed-wing fighter bombers, the low flying, slow cruising Hueys could provide "discriminating fire" to neutralize ground fire in the landing zone while sparing noncombatants. This was especially important to Slavich. According to Neil Sheehan who, like other journalists assigned to cover combat in Vietnam, would often fly on missions at Slavich's invitation, "[Slavich] was very responsible not to kill women and children. He wanted to fight other soldiers. It's a moral code he has to a high degree. Part of the ethic of a genuine soldier." Sheehan continued: "He made every one of his pilots considerate. They thought—and looked—before opening fire." Slavich put it simply, "All your firepower is no good if you kill women and children."

Brigadier General Joseph Stilwell Jr. wrote at that time of the uniqueness of the helicopter unit, commenting that it was "the only one of its kind in the Army and the only one doing the kind of work it does in a combat environment" in the midst of formidable obstacles such as "the development of appropriate maneuvers, operation of outdated HU-1A helicopters with commensurate parts supply problems, use of jury rigged weaponry, and administrative problems connected with a unit on temporary station orders which had also to perform certain test objectives as well." Stilwell concluded, "That this unit has gained the reputation and respect and professional competence it has may be solely contributed to the drive, ambition, dedication, and integrity displayed by Major Slavich during this period of command." Once word spread about the effectiveness of the UTT, Army and Marine transport pilots refused to fly without UTT support; at times, Slavich and his men would fly up to five and six missions a day, proving to his superiors "that these most vulnerable of military machines were, when flown with originality and daring, in fact not vulnerable at all". General Paul Harkins, head of over 14,000 advisers in South Vietnam, called the UTT "the most essential unit in my command". In a 1963 fitness report for Slavich, General Stilwell—who rode shotgun with him on numerous missions, even occasionally serving as his door gunner—wrote: "[Slavich's] unit, beyond a doubt, has offered more protection and saved more American lives, through the ingenuity of employment, than any other element in a counter-insurgency role in the Republic of Vietnam."

==== The Air War: Politics and the Press ====
Although the UTT's experimental mission of providing close-in tactical support was a success, the ongoing issue of politics remained. Owing to the Key West Agreement of 1948, the air force essentially owned the skies when it came to the use of strategic and tactical air assets. The achievements of "Slavich's People", as they were called, repeatedly drew the ire of the air force, creating a second front of sorts in the Vietnam arena: a PR war. Slavich excelled in that battle as well. Not one to merely tell war correspondents about the Hueys and what they could accomplish, he often invited the journalists to fly on missions so they could see for themselves, usually with very little notice and often much to the chagrin of the army's Public Information Office (PIO). As he saw it, if it was his job was to sell the army and the Hueys, there was no better sales force than the press.

Some of the best known correspondents of the war—David Halberstam, Neil Sheehan, Peter Arnett, Charley Mohr, and Horst Faas—flew often with Slavich and became his good friends. Since they and other journalists previously had to content themselves with getting sanitized talking points from the PIO or renting cars to find the battles themselves, when Slavich offered to take them directly into the fight, they were eager to hop a ride. In Once Upon a Distant War, William Prochnau wrote that Slavich not only gave [the journalists] the skies, he gave them the war, affording them a rare and unfettered bird's eye view of the unfolding conflict below. Said Halberstam, "After Ivan came in, you just couldn't bullshit us anymore. We could find out anything."

=== Post–Vietnam War ===
From 1963, Slavich served as the aviation action officer with DCS/OPS, United States Continental Army Command, followed by a tour as a student in the Armed Forces Staff College in Norfolk, Virginia. He returned to Korea in 1968, serving first as infantry battalion commander, 2nd Infantry Division and finally as G3 director of plans and operations, 2nd Infantry Division. He was then assigned as the aviation battalion commander of the 82nd Aviation Battalion, 82nd Airborne Division in Fort Bragg, North Carolina. Slavich attended the United States Naval War College in Newport, Rhode Island in 1971, and served as the Third Brigade commander, 8th Infantry Division in Mannheim, West Germany until 1973. He retired in 1975 after serving as the brigade commander, U.S. Army Readiness Division at Fort Devens, Massachusetts.

== Later life and death ==
After retiring from the U.S. Army in 1975, Slavich settled in North Carolina, where he taught at Central Piedmont Community College in Charlotte before embarking on a successful career in real estate. He was the president of McGuire Commercial Properties in Charlotte, and the Oppel Company of Tega Cay, a residential building company in Tega Cay, South Carolina. Slavich retired to Marco Island, Florida in 1987, where he lived with his wife, Miriam, until his death on October 20, 2012.

== Awards and decorations ==
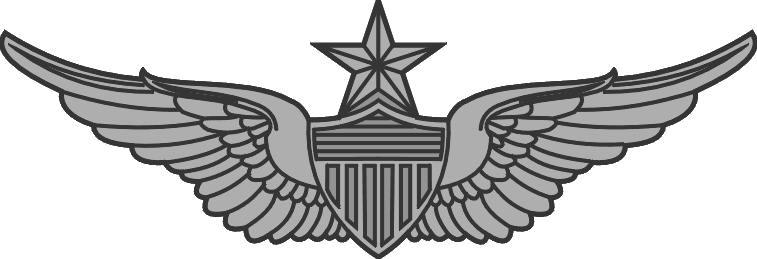
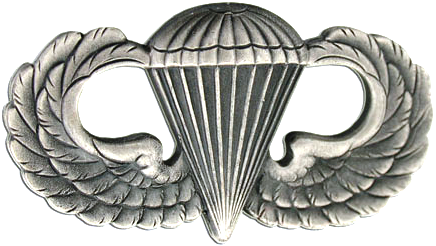
Legion of Merit with two oak leaf clusters
Distinguished Flying Cross
Bronze Star Medal
Air Medal with four oak leaf clusters
Army Commendation Medal with one oak leaf cluster
World War II Victory Medal
National Defense Service Medal with one oak leaf cluster
Korean Service Medal
Armed Forces Expeditionary Medal
Vietnam Service Medal
Vietnamese Gallantry Cross
Vietnam Campaign Medal
United Nations Service Medal for Korea
Combat Infantry Badge
Senior Army Aviator
Parachutist (United States)
