= Anthony Buich =

American football player (born 1978)

Profile
- Position: Quarterback

Personal information
- Born: May 23, 1978 (age 48)
- Listed height: 6 ft 0 in (1.83 m)
- Listed weight: 205 lb (93 kg)

Career information
- High school: St. Ignatius Prep (San Francisco, California)
- College: Eastern Illinois

Career history
- Iowa Barnstormers (2001); Tulsa Talons (2002); Tampa Bay Storm (2003)*; Wichita Stealth (2003–2004); Grand Rapids Rampage (2004); Nashville Kats (2005); San Diego Riptide (2005)
- * Offseason or practice squad member only

Awards and highlights
- Second-team All-af2 (2002)

Career AFL statistics
- Comp. / Att.: 233 / 395
- Passing yards: 2,600
- TD–INT: 39–11
- QB rating: 91.75
- Rushing TDs: 8
- Stats at ArenaFan.com

Anthony Buich (born May 23, 1978) is an American former professional football quarterback who played two seasons in the Arena Football League (AFL) for the Grand Rapids Rampage and Nashville Kats. He played college football at Eastern Illinois University. He was also a member of the Iowa Barnstormers, Tulsa Talons, Tampa Bay Storm, Wichita Stealth, and San Diego Riptide.

== Early life and college ==
Anthony Buich was born on May 23, 1978. He attended St. Ignatius College Preparatory in San Francisco, California.

Buich first played college football at College of San Mateo. He transferred to play for the Eastern Illinois Panthers. He recorded career totals of 27 touchdowns and 17 interceptions on 4,493 passing yards.

== Professional career ==
Buich played for the Iowa Barnstormers of the af2 in 2001. He recorded a record of 9–4 as the team's starting quarterback. He threw for 3,021 yards and 58 touchdowns in 13 games for the Barnstormers.

Buich played for the Tulsa Talons of the af2 in 2002. He led the Talons to their first National Conference Central Division championship in 2002 and a 14–2 regular season record. He earned Second Team All-af2 honors in 2002, throwing for 3,004 yards and 64 touchdowns. Buich also completed 66.1% of his passes, which led the league and set a Talons single season record. His passer rating of 116.5 in 2002 ranked him third among all af2 quarterbacks.

Buich was signed by the Tampa Bay Storm of the AFL on January 11, 2003. He was released by the Storm on January 25 and signed to the team's practice squad on January 30, 2003. He was leased by the storm on February 20, 2003.

Buich played for the Wichita Stealth of the af2 in 2003, completing 271 of 496 pass attempts for 3,454 yards and 64 touchdowns. He helped the Stealth to a franchise record win total in 2003 with eight victories. He ranked second in passing yards in a season, first in touchdown passes, second in pass attempts, and second in completions in Stealth history after the 2003 season. He also led the Stealth to their second consecutive af2 playoff berth.

Buich signed with the AFL's Grand Rapids Rampage on January 19, 2004. He recorded 39 touchdowns on 2,600 passing yards for the Rampage in 2004.

Buich was signed by the Nashville Kats of the AFL on January 4, 2005. He played in one game for the Kats but did not record any statistics. He was released by Nashville on January 31, 2005.

Buich played for the af2's San Diego Riptide in 2005 before suffering an injury.
