= Joseph E. Tinney =

American lawyer

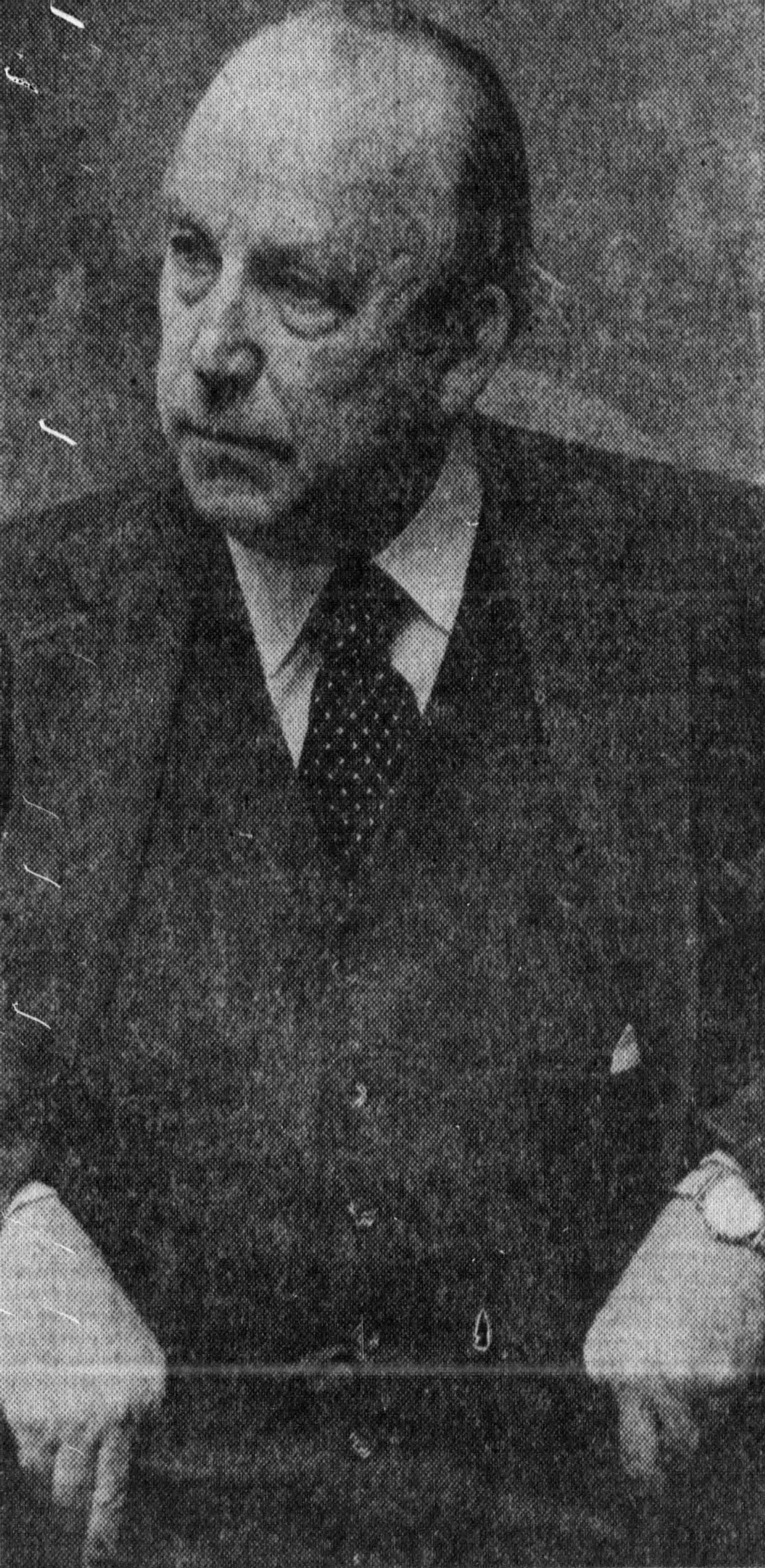
Tinney in 1975

Joseph Emmanuel Tinney (April 24, 1910 – May 13, 2006) was an American attorney and politician from San Francisco. A Republican, a member of the San Francisco Board of Supervisors, and then San Francisco city assessor, "Tinney's integrity was so unquestioned that mayors from both parties -- Republican George Christopher and Democrat John Shelley -- appointed him to the city posts, and Democratic political leaders played key roles in his re-election campaigns."

== Biography ==
Tinney was the youngest of seven children born to Irish immigrant parents. His father was a teamster and then a cable car gripman who worked the night shift. He grew up in Bernal Heights and the Outer Mission. Tinney was an excellent student who graduated from St. Ignatius High School as valedictorian in 1927. He graduated from college and law school at the University of San Francisco in six years. Tinney married in 1940 and moved to Merced Manor, but based his law practice in the Mission District and maintained close ties to the neighborhood.

Tinney entered politics in the early 1940s as a member of the Republican County Central Committee and the Republican State Central Committee. Later he came a member of the San Francisco Planning Commission, serving for a time as its chair. On March 27, 1961, Mayor George Christopher (who was Tinney's neighbor in Merced Manor) appointed Tinney to fill a vacancy on the San Francisco Board of Supervisors created by the death of a supervisor. Tinney was then elected twice to the Board of Supervisors, in 1962 and 1966. Although supervisors at the time were elected at-large rather than by district, Tinney was identified with the Mission District. He argued on behalf of the Latino community to have Mission Street closed off to automobiles for Cinco de Mayo celebrations, noting that the street was closed to automobiles for Saint Patrick's Day and Columbus Day celebrations. Considered a fiscal conservative, Tinney nevertheless argued in favor of pay raises for San Francisco Municipal Railway bus drivers in the 1960s.

In 1966, Tinney left the Board of Supervisors to become assessor, replacing Russ Wolden, the assessor of 28 years who was convicted of bribery and conspiracy. Tinney reformed the assessor's office, collecting unpaid back taxes, and "although many homeowners and business saw their taxes go up, Mr. Tinney handily won re-election, time and time again, and was one of the biggest vote-getters in the city." Tinney's popularity was such that he considered running for San Francisco mayor or state Senate.

Tinney retired from public service and returned to private practice in civil litigation in the Mission District. His wife, the former Helen Elizabeth Frahm, died in 1999, and Tinney retired from law practice in 2000.

Tinney died on May 13, 2006, at age 96, from complications from lymphoma. At the time of his death he lived in a home for patients with Alzheimer's disease in Petaluma. He was survived by a son, Joseph Tinney of Petaluma, a daughter, Marcella Tinney Frank of Windsor in Sonoma County, seven grandchildren, and a great-grandchild.
