= Jeff McIntyre =

American football player (born 1954)

No. 52, 50, 59
- Position: Linebacker

Personal information
- Born: September 20, 1954 (age 72); Beaumont, Texas, U.S.
- Listed height: 6 ft 3 in (1.91 m)
- Listed weight: 232 lb (105 kg)

Career information
- High school: Mount Carmel (Los Angeles, California)
- College: Los Angeles Southwest (1975–1976); Arizona State (1977–1978)
- NFL draft: 1979: 6th round, 148th overall pick

Career history
- Denver Broncos (1979)*; St. Louis Cardinals (1979)*; San Francisco 49ers (1979–1980); St. Louis Cardinals (1980–1981); Arizona Wranglers (1983)*; Washington Federals (1983); San Antonio Gunslingers (1984)
- * Offseason or practice squad member only

Awards and highlights
- Second-team All-Southern California Conference (1976)

Career NFL statistics
- Games played: 24
- Games started: 5
- Stats at Pro Football Reference

Jeffery Glenn McIntyre (born September 20, 1954) is an American former professional football player who was a linebacker in the National Football League (NFL). He played college football at Los Angeles Southwest College before transferring to the Arizona State Sun Devils. He was selected by the Denver Broncos in the sixth round of the 1979 NFL draft and then played two seasons in the NFL for the San Francisco 49ers and St. Louis Cardinals. He later played two seasons in the United States Football League (USFL) for the Washington Federals and San Antonio Gunslingers. He was also a member of the Arizona Wranglers.

== Early life and college ==
McIntyre was born on September 20, 1954, in Beaumont, Texas. He attended Mount Carmel High School in Los Angeles, California, and was the last of 10 of their alumni to play in the National Football League (NFL) before the school closed. He attended Los Angeles Southwest College from 1975 to 1976. He played running back for the Cougars and was one of the top runners in the conference as a sophomore, having for a time the highest rushing average. He was named second-team All-Southern California Conference for the 1976 season.

McIntyre transferred to play for the Arizona State Sun Devils in 1977 and was initially a running back before switching to linebacker as a senior in 1978. He was the starting middle linebacker in his final season. While at Arizona State, he developed an interest in snakes after going snake hunting with teammates; he later owned two as pets including one of the world's largest garter snakes, earning him the nickname "Snake Man".

== Professional career ==
McIntyre was selected by the Denver Broncos in the sixth round (148th overall) of the 1979 NFL draft. He signed his rookie contract on June 18. He was released by the team prior to the season on August 21, 1979. Two days after being released by the Broncos, McIntyre was signed by the St. Louis Cardinals off waivers. He was released on August 27, being one of the final roster cuts.

After the San Francisco 49ers placed Mike Hogan on injured reserve, the team signed McIntyre to fill the empty roster spot on September 11, 1979. He appeared in the team's final 14 games and was a starter three times, as the team ended with a record of 2–14. He mainly appeared on special teams.

McIntyre was released by the 49ers in July 1980 and then was claimed off waivers by the Cardinals on July 11, 1980. He was placed on injured reserve with a toe injury on August 18. He was released from injured reserve on October 13, and then was re-signed to the active roster two days later after clearing waivers, replacing the injured John Barefield. He appeared in the final 10 games of the season, starting two at inside linebacker while the Cardinals finished with a record of 5–11. He was released by the Cardinals on August 17, 1981, which ultimately ended his NFL career, with McIntyre having appeared in 24 games, five as a starter.

In October 1982, McIntyre signed with the Arizona Wranglers of the United States Football League (USFL); his rights had previously been owned by the Tampa Bay Bandits but the Wranglers made a trade to acquire them. He was released on February 20, 1983, prior to the regular season. He was signed to the development squad of the Washington Federals on March 21. He was later promoted and appeared in eight games, six as a starter, totaling 1.5 sacks. He then played for the San Antonio Gunslingers in 1984 to close out his career.

== Later life ==
McIntyre became a coach and personal trainer after his playing career. He had a son, Drew, who played for the United States national junior American football team. In 2023, McIntyre took part in a study for a program promoting heart health; he took an echocardiogram "as a formality to be able to encourage others", but it was discovered he had an enlarged aorta and he underwent surgery. He said that taking the test saved his life: "I had my workout ready, and the doc told me if I would've done that, my heart would've exploded, with no symptoms."
