= John Helwig =

American football player (1927–1994)

No. 60, 80
- Position: Linebacker

Personal information
- Born: December 5, 1927; Los Angeles, California, U.S.
- Died: December 2, 1994 (aged 66); Pontiac, Michigan, U.S.
- Listed height: 6 ft 2 in (1.88 m)
- Listed weight: 208 lb (94 kg)

Career information
- High school: Mount Carmel (Los Angeles)
- College: Notre Dame (1947–1950)
- NFL draft: 1950: 11th round, 140th overall pick

Career history
- Chicago Bears (1953–1956)

Awards and highlights
- National champion (1949)

Career NFL statistics
- Interceptions: 3
- Fumble recoveries: 4
- Return yards: 12
- Stats at Pro Football Reference

John Francis Helwig (December 5, 1927 – December 2, 1994) was an American professional football linebacker who played four seasons with the Chicago Bears of the National Football League (NFL). He was selected by the Bears in the eleventh round of the 1950 NFL draft after playing college football at the University of Notre Dame.

== Early life and college ==
John Francis Helwig was born on December 5, 1927, in Los Angeles. He attended Mount Carmel High School in Los Angeles.

Helwig played college football at the University of Notre Dame. He was also an All-American shot putter for the Notre Dame Fighting Irish track and field team, placing 8th at the 1949 NCAA Track and Field Championships.

== Professional career ==
Helwig was selected by the Chicago Bears in the 11th round, with the 140th overall pick, of the 1950 NFL draft. However, he was drafted into the United States Army in April 1951 during the Korean War. After the war, he signed with the Bears on July 7, 1953. Helwig played in 42 games, starting 23 games, for the Bears from 1953 to 1956.

== Personal life ==
Helwig's wife had been illegally collecting John's NFL pension since his death and had twice told officials that he was alive. After his wife's death in 2007, their daughter began collecting the pension before she was charged with fraud in 2011. The pension collected by John's wife and daughter after his death added up to over $200,000.
