= Dick Wilkins =

American football player (1925–1997)

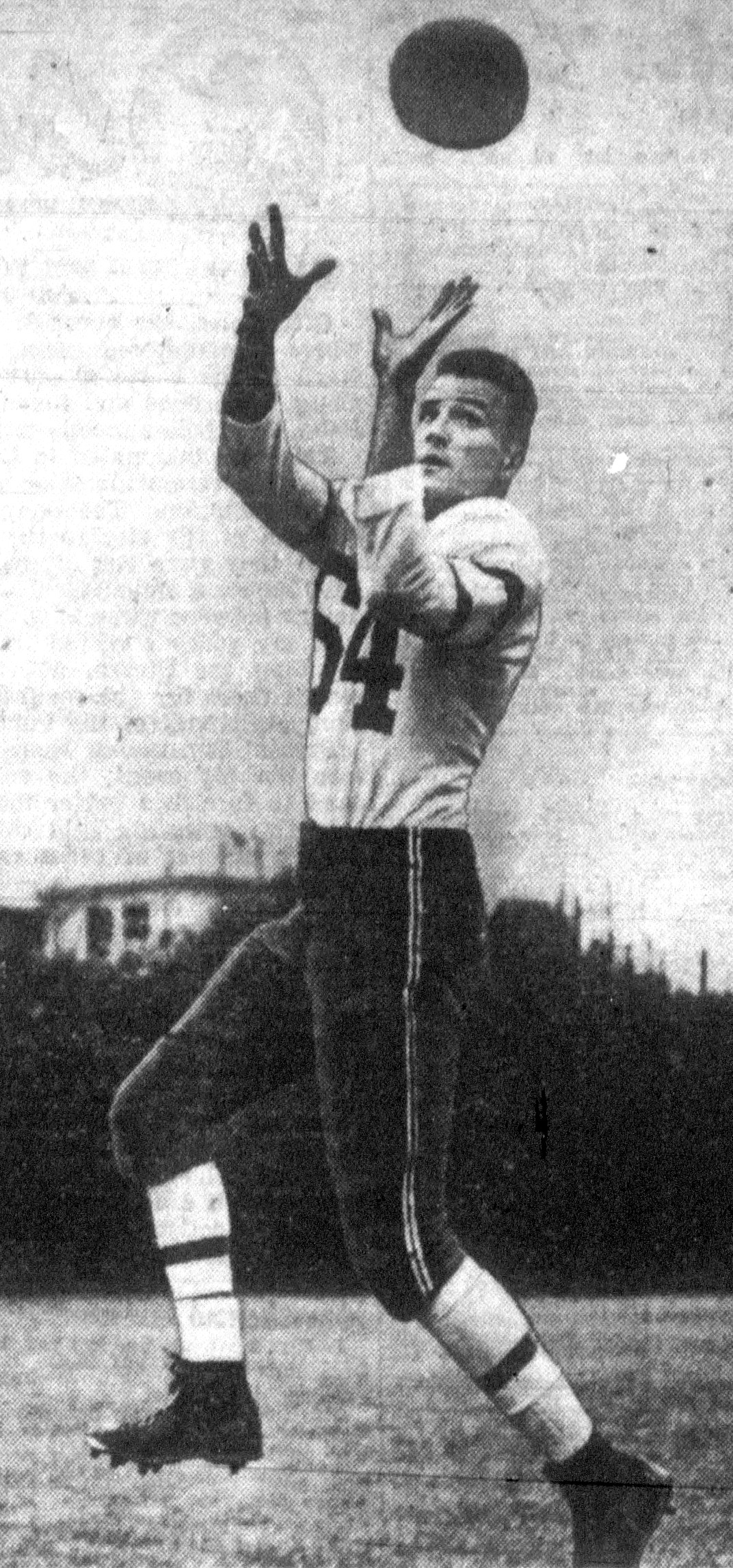
- Wilkins, circa 1949

No. 54, 88
- Position: End

Personal information
- Born: August 28, 1925; Portland, Oregon, U.S.
- Died: October 21, 1997 (aged 72); Lane County, Oregon, U.S.
- Listed height: 6 ft 2 in (1.88 m)
- Listed weight: 194 lb (88 kg)

Career information
- High school: Lincoln (Portland)
- College: Oregon (1948)
- NFL draft: 1948: 25th round, 226th overall pick

Career history
- Los Angeles Dons (1949); Dallas Texans (1952); New York Giants (1954)

Awards and highlights
- First-team All-PCC (1948)

Career NFL/AAFC statistics
- Receptions: 68
- Receiving yards: 1,050
- Receiving touchdowns: 7
- Stats at Pro Football Reference

Richard Maurice Wilkins (August 28, 1925 – October 21, 1997) was an American football end who played in the National Football League (NFL). He played college football at Oregon.

== College career ==
Wilkins served in the Marine Corps during WWII before receiving a discharge after his vision was impaired when he was hit in the eye with a shell casing during training. He enrolled at the University of Oregon and joined the Webfoots basketball as a forward and baseball team as a pitcher. As a freshman, Wilkins was the leading scorer in the 1945 NCAA tournament with 22 points per game. He became the first Oregon player to score 1,000 career points and finished with 1,186.

Wilkins was talked into joining the football team as a senior. In his lone season playing college football he led the Webfoots with 27 receptions (a Pacific Coast Conference record) for 520 yards and five touchdowns and was named first-team All-Pacific Coast.

== Professional career ==
Wilkins was drafted by the New York Giants in the 25th round of the 1948 NFL draft, but instead signed with the Los Angeles Dons of the All-America Football Conference. After the AAFC folded Wilkins was selected by the Los Angeles Rams in the third round of the 1950 AAFC dispersal draft. He was recalled by the Marine Corps before the draft and missed the next two seasons. Wilkins' rights were traded to the Dallas Texans in 1952 as part of an eleven player trade for Les Richter. Wilkins led the Texans with 32 receptions, 416 receiving yards and three touchdown catches in 1952. He did not play in 1953 in order to focus on his lumber business in Oregon. He was acquired by the Giants in a trade in 1954 and played in four games before suffering a shoulder injury.

== Personal life ==
Wilkins was the father of Olympic gold medalist Mac Wilkins.
