= Jon Baker (linebacker) =

American football player (1923–1992)

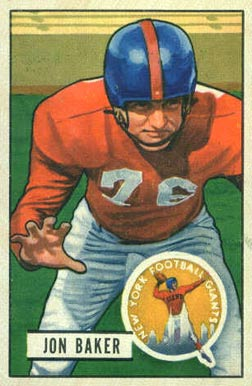
- Baker on a 1951 Bowman football card

No. 76, 60
- Positions: Linebacker, guard

Personal information
- Born: June 14, 1923; San Francisco, California, U.S.
- Died: November 26, 1992 (aged 69); San Rafael, California, U.S.
- Listed height: 6 ft 2 in (1.88 m)
- Listed weight: 214 lb (97 kg)

Career information
- High school: San Francisco Polytechnic
- College: California (1944, 1946–1948)
- NFL draft: 1949: 7th round, 67th overall pick

Career history
- New York Giants (1949–1952)

Awards and highlights
- Second-team All-Pro (1951); 2× Pro Bowl (1951-1952); Third-team All-American (1947); First-team All-PCC (1948)

Career NFL statistics
- Games played: 46
- Games started: 38
- Fumble recoveries: 3
- Stats at Pro Football Reference

Jonathan Baker (June 14, 1923 – November 26, 1992) was an American professional football player who was a linebacker for the New York Giants of the National Football League (NFL). He played college football for the California Golden Bears and was selected 67th overall in the seventh round of the 1949 NFL draft by the Los Angeles Rams.
