= Mally Roncal =

Make-up artist

- Born: Melissa Hernandez Roncal; January 8, 1972 (age 54); Middletown, New York, U.S.
- Education: John S. Burke Catholic High School
- Alma mater: Marist College (BA)
- Occupations: businesswoman, makeup artist
- Known for: Mally Beauty cosmetics line
- Spouse: Phil Bickett
- Children: Pilar and Sophie (twins); Vivienne

Melissa "Mally" Hernandez Roncal (born January 8, 1972) is a makeup artist and founder of Mally Beauty.

== Early life ==
Roncal is a first-generation Filipino-American. Roncal credits her stylish mother as the original inspiration for her love of beauty and glamour. Roncal has said of her mother, "She was a doctor and she was always done. Like hair, makeup, heels, nail, clothes, Chanel, the whole thing. She was very particular and I literally remember sitting at her boudoir with her and watching her do her face and she would sort of teach me as she was going along." Roncal's mother was diagnosed with breast cancer and died in March 1989. Roncal's brand motto that looking good makes people feel good originated from her mother's journey.

== Education ==
Originally a pre-med student in 1995, Roncal prepared for a career in dermatology, before shifting to a degree in fine arts.

== Career ==
After working for a fashion designer, Roncal began her freelance career as a makeup artist for celebrities like Celine Dion, Beyoncé Knowles, Jennifer Lopez, Taylor Swift, RuPaul, Madonna, Jennifer Lopez, Mary J. Blige, Hayden Panettiere, Rihanna, Teri Hatcher, Celine Dion, Lee Ann Womack, Ashlee Simpson, Angelina Jolie, Heidi Klum, and Maggie Gyllenhaal

This work included Beyonce's look in her "Dangerously in Love" campaign, photography of which hangs as a part of the collection of the Smithsonian Museum. The first time she appeared on QVC her segment, set for an hour, was cut short 22 minutes early as the network had become completely sold out of her line. Roncal served as a spokesperson for Sephora before founding in 2005 Mally Beauty, a line of makeup and cosmetic tools based on her industry experience.

She has appeared on various platforms to discuss make-up techniques and trends TikTok, including Good Morning America, Wendy Williams Show, The View, The Oprah Winfrey Show, Rachael Ray, and Today as a beauty expert and has written for the New York Times, Huffington Post, and iVillage This has included promoting the use of make-up without special tools for contouring, etc. Roncal also the author of the Random House book Love, Lashes, and Lipstick: My Secrets for a Gorgeous, Happy Life. She was also featured on Season 13 of The Bachelor when she did Molly Malaney's makeup for her wedding to bachelor Jason Mesnick In 2023 she was included on Forbes magazine's "50 over 50: Lifestyle" list.

== Mally Beauty ==
Through Mally Beauty, Roncal has partnered on new products with individuals such as Ru Paul (in 2019), with whom she shares a friendship, and the movie franchise Frozen. Since founding her company, she has continued to be involved with the creation of new cosmetics to add to the company's offerings.

In 2017 the company's products became available in more than one thousand locations of the department store Kohl's. In 2018, they added its previously QVC exclusive brand Ulta Beauty to its brick and mortar offerings, which was first offered via television purchase in 2013. At that time, the president of the company was quoted as saying "The brand has to be married as closely as possible to [Roncal's] personality." That year, a minority stake in the company was acquired by Guthy-Renker Ventures. In 2021 Mally Beauty was acquired by AS Beauty Group, and recent products have included the Poreless Face Defender that creates an airbrushed effect on the skin where it is applied.

== Personal life ==
Roncal lives with her husband, photographer Phil Bickett, and their three daughters (twins Pilar and Sophie plus youngest Vivienne).
