= Willy Maley =

- Born: William Timothy Maley; December 2, 1960 (age 65); Glasgow, Scotland

Academic background
- Education: University of Strathclyde (BA, First Class Honours, Meston Prize); Jesus College, Cambridge (PhD)

William Timothy "Willy" Maley (born 2 December 1960, in Glasgow, Scotland) is a Scottish literary critic, editor, teacher and writer.

Maley is Professor of Renaissance Studies at the University of Glasgow, Fellow of the English Association (FEA), and founder, with Philip Hobsbaum, of Glasgow's Creative Writing programme. He is a prolific author on subjects including early modern English literature from Spenser to Milton, and on modern Scottish and Irish writing.

== Biography ==
Willy Maley is the seventh of nine children, and the first in his family to go to University. He was raised in the district of Possilpark, Glasgow. Maley's father, James Maley, was a former Communist Party member and veteran of the Spanish Civil War, who borrowed books weekly from Gilmorehill Book Exchange and other sources. Maley grew up in a modest family home, one where there were no limits on what was read, from American Pulp to the collected works of Marx and Lenin, from Enid Blyton to Joseph Stalin, and the classics in-between.

== Education ==
Maley left Possilpark Secondary School in 1978 and worked for three years, for Strathclyde Regional Council's Roads Department, the Royal Bank of Scotland, and Glasgow City Libraries before gaining through night classes the qualifications to start at the University of Strathclyde in 1981. He went there initially to study librarianship but failed, resigned from the libraries, and continued with his studies in English Literature and Politics. Maley graduated from Strathclyde with First Class Honours with Distinction, winning the Meston Prize for the top degree result in his academic year.

In October 1985, after a summer working at the British Film Institute in London, Maley went to Jesus College, Cambridge, earning a PhD for his thesis, Marx and Spenser: Elizabeth and the Problem of Imperial Power, which was later renamed Edmund Spenser and Cultural Identity in Early Modern Ireland. In 1990 Maley also completed a Diploma in Linguistics for the Teaching of English Language and Literature at the University of Strathclyde.

== Career ==
Between 1989 and 1995 Maley had eight plays performed at Glasgow's Mayfest and at the Edinburgh Fringe, as well as the West Yorkshire Playhouse, the Lemon Tree in Aberdeen, the Magnum Centre in Irvine and most of Glasgow's main theatres, including The Arches, The Old Athenaeum, The Pavilion, and The Tron. Maley's theatre credits include:

- From The Calton to Catalonia (1990), a dramatized account of his father's experiences as a POW during the Spanish Civil War, co-written with his brother, John Maley.
- No Mean Fighter (1992), a unique collaboration between students at the RSAMD and inmates at Barlinnie Special Unit, which won a Scotsman Fringe First at the Edinburgh Festival.
- The Lions of Lisbon (1992), the story of Celtic's 1967 European Cup victory, co-written with Iain Auld,

From 1992–94, Willy Maley worked as a lecturer at the University of London (at Goldsmiths and Queen Mary respectively). In 1994 he moved to Glasgow University, where he was founder in 1995, with Philip Hobsbaum, of the Creative Writing Master's program. In 1997 he published three books on literary criticism and the following year and edited the Blackwell Companion to Renaissance Writing, and published a compilation of essays on James Kelman. Maley was promoted to Reader in 1998, and to Professor in 1999. To the question of how he went from drawing income support in Possilpark in 1991 to Professor of Renaissance Studies at the University of Glasgow in eight years, Maley replied: "You mean, What took me so long? I was busy."

Willy Maley has taught at Dartmouth College and the University of Sunderland. He was the first recipient of the Gerard Manley Hopkins Visiting Professorship at John Carroll University in Cleveland (1998).

In 2003, Maley was presented with the Lifting Up the World Award by Sri Chinmoy at a ceremony at Edinburgh University. During seasons 2003–04, and 2004–05, Maley was a columnist for the Celtic View, the official magazine of Celtic Football Club, which he has supported since childhood. Maley has also worked extensively–but not expensively–in radio, television and film since 1985, when he was credited as Assistant Production Accountant on Derek Jarman's film Caravaggio.

Maley's poem, "On My Father’s Refusal to Renew his Subscription to The Beijing Review", first published in PN Review in 2006, was selected by Alan Spence and the Scottish Poetry Library as one of the Best Scottish Poems 2007.

== Publications ==
- Representing Ireland: Literature and the Origins of Conflict, 1534–1660 (1993) (co-edited with Brendan Bradshaw and Andrew Hadfield)
- A Spenser Chronology (1994)
- Postcolonial Criticism (1997) (co-edited with Bart Moore-Gilbert and Gareth Stanton)
- Salvaging Spenser: Colonialism, Culture and Identity (1997)
- A View of the Present State of Ireland: From the First Published Edition (1997) (co-edited with Andrew Hadfield)
- Irish Studies and Postcolonial Theory, special issue of Irish Studies Review 7, 2 (1999) (co-editor, with Colin Graham)
- Kelman and Commitment, a special issue of the Edinburgh Review 108 (2001) (co-editor, with Ellen-Raïssa Jackson)
- Nation, State and Empire in English Renaissance Literature: Shakespeare to Milton (2003)
- British Identities and English Renaissance Literature (2002) (co-edited with David J. Baker)
- Shakespeare and Scotland (2004) (co-edited with Andrew Murphy)
- Class, a special issue of Drouth 18 (2005) (Guest Editor)
- 100 Best Scottish Books (2005) (co-edited with Brian Donaldson)
- Spheres of Influence: Intellectual and Cultural Publics from Shakespeare to Habermas (2006) (co-edited with Alex Benchimol)
