= Ellery Williams =

American football player (1926–2017)

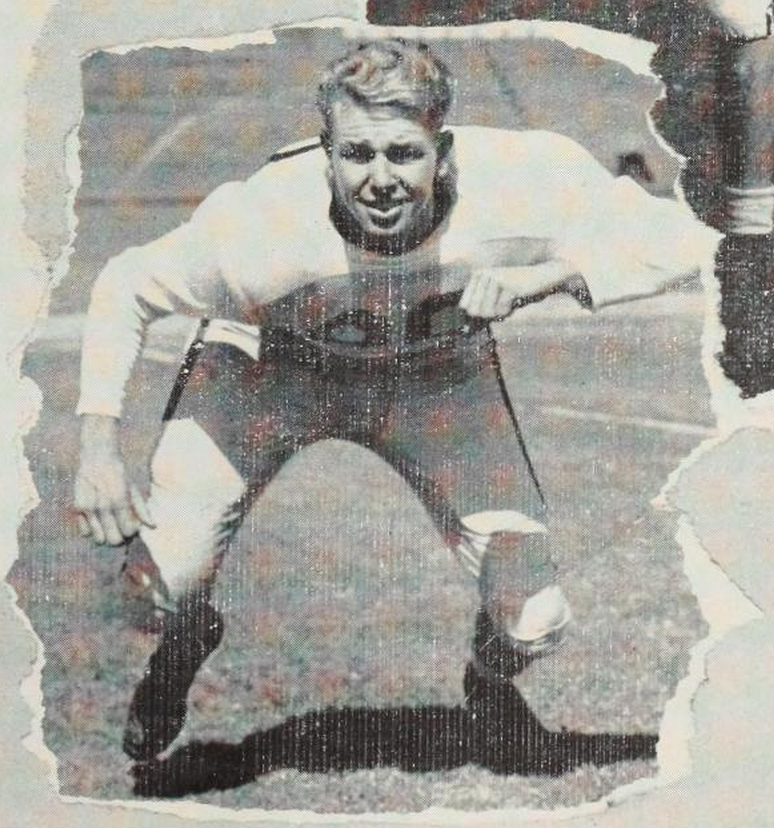
- Williams pictured c. 1949 at Santa Clara

No. 85
- Position: End

Personal information
- Born: March 20, 1926; St. Louis, Missouri, U.S.
- Died: March 7, 2017 (aged 90); Los Altos, California, U.S.
- Listed height: 6 ft 0 in (1.83 m)
- Listed weight: 185 lb (84 kg)

Career information
- High school: Pasadena (CA)
- College: Santa Clara
- NFL draft: 1950: 8th round, 101st overall pick

Career history
- New York Giants (1950)

Awards and highlights
- First-team All-PCC (1948)

Career NFL statistics
- Receptions: 4
- Receiving yards: 78
- Stats at Pro Football Reference

Ellery Frederick Williams (March 20, 1926 – March 7, 2017) was an American professional football end who played for the New York Giants. He played college football at Santa Clara University, having previously attended Pasadena High School in Pasadena, California. He was a member of the Santa Clara University Hall of Fame. Williams died in 2017 at the age of 90.
