= Malley Fitness Center =

Sports center at Santa Clara University

Coordinates: 37.34858°N 121.93670°W

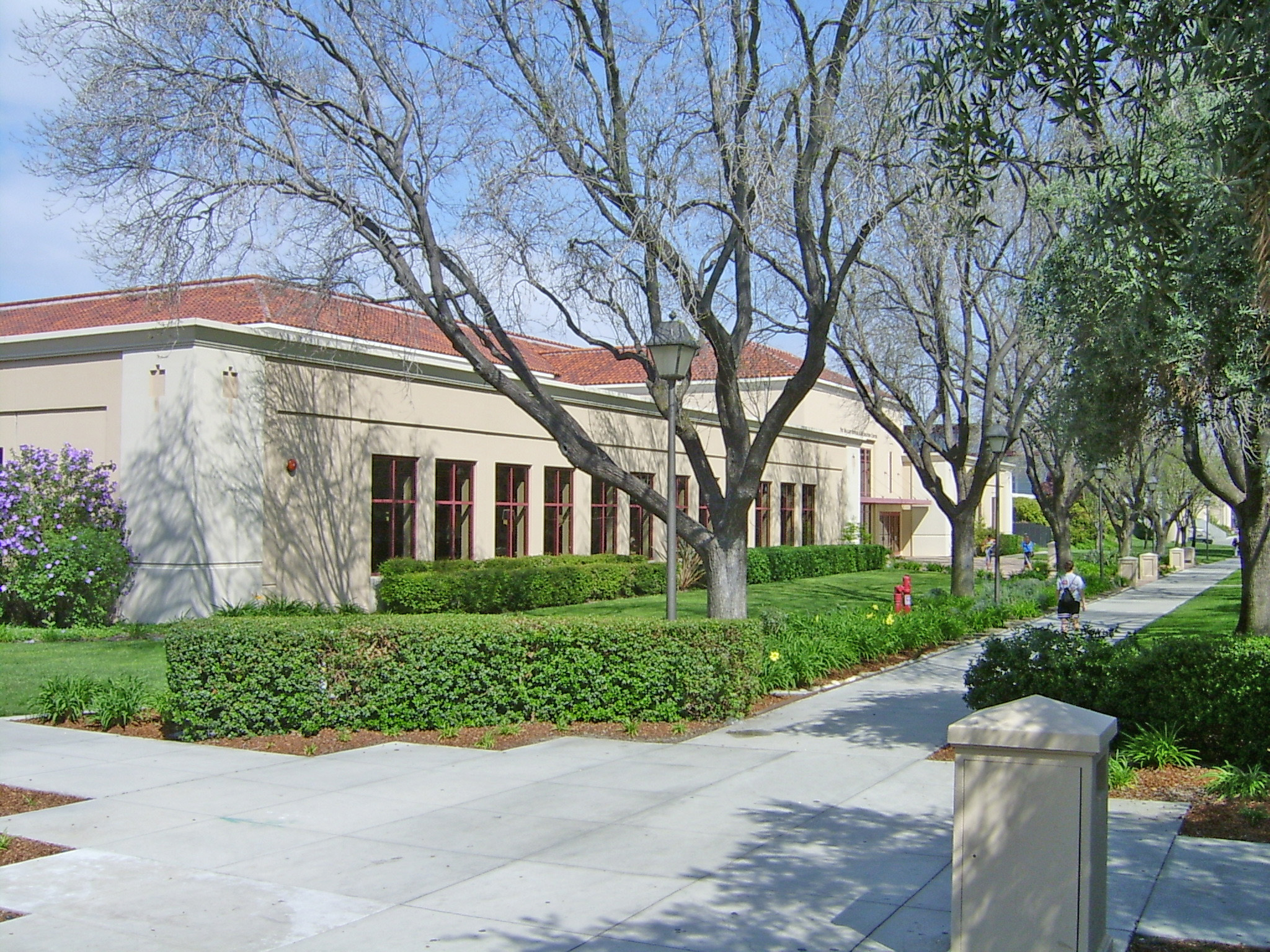
Malley Fitness Center

The Pat Malley Fitness and Recreation Center is located at Santa Clara University. Constructed and dedicated on October 8, 1999, the center is the primary sports and fitness center for the general population at Santa Clara University.

Built at a cost of $8.8 million, the 44,000-square-foot (4,100 m^{2}) facility is named for long-time SCU football coach Pat Malley and includes three basketball/volleyball courts, a weight room, two locker rooms, a 2,100-square-foot (200 m^{2}) multipurpose room, a lounge space, and offices for recreation and wellness programs. Weight and fitness facilities are available for university athletics in the Leavey Center. Malley is also accessible to the campus community for recreational use.

SCU alumni, including many of Malley's former football players, were involved in the financing, planning, and construction of the facility, which includes approximately $400,000 in exercise equipment.

During its first month of operation, daily attendance of SCU students, staff, faculty, and alumni at the fitness center averaged about 1,200. The structure is situated next to the Leavey Center on the east side of the SCU campus that was designed by CannonDesign.

The 9,500-square-foot (880 m^{2}) weight room is named the Filizetti-McPherson Weight Room, after John Filizetti and Bill McPherson. The lobby area was donated by Brent Jones and his wife Dana.

In April of 2024 they had a monthly check in total of 36,282, a new record for them. In total, they had 265,516 check ins during the 2023-24 academic year, or 17,127 more than in 2022-23.

On Sunday, October 15 the Malley Center celebrated its 25th anniversary by giving out free 25th anniversary stickers to the first 25 patrons of every hour.

== Renovations ==
- In 2010 SCU resurfaced the basketball courts, adding the "Bronco" text and logo onto the middle basketball court. A new industrial laundry unit was also added to the facility.
- Between 2011-2017 the Malley Fitness Center underwent numerous improvements, including new weight room equipment, as well as office and bathroom renovations.
- In November 2017, SCU opened an outdoor fitness area across from the Malley Fitness Center.

== Membership ==
- Current students, faculty, and staff are able to use the facility free of charge while they are actively taking classes.
- Alumni have passes available for $480 per year, $250 for 3 months, and $70 for 1 month. Alumni also have an option for a $75 pass for 10 unique visits that expires after 1 year.
- The general community is not eligible for memberships.
