= Len Salvemini =

American soccer player

Personal information
- Full name: Leonard A. Salvemini
- Date of birth: July 22, 1953 (age 73)
- Place of birth: Daly City, California, U.S.
- Height: 5 ft 5 in (1.65 m)
- Positions: Defender; midfielder

Youth career
- 1971–1974: Air Force Falcons

Senior career*
Years	Team	Apps	(Gls)
1980–1981	San Francisco Fog (indoor)	35	(11)
1981–1982	Kansas City Comets (indoor)	42	(6)
1983–1984	Memphis Americans (indoor)	25	(3)
- * Club domestic league appearances and goals

Len Salvemini (born July 22, 1953) is an American retired soccer player who spent three season in the Major Indoor Soccer League.

== Career ==
In 1971, Salvemini graduated from St. Ignatius College Preparatory where he set the West Catholic Athletic League career and single season scoring records. He then attended the United States Air Force Academy where he played on the men's soccer team from 1971 to 1974. He was a 1972 Honorable Mention (third team) and 1974 Second Team All American. His sixty-four career goals and 149 career points remain Falcon records. In 1975, he graduated with a commission as a second lieutenant in the United States Air Force. Salvemini played for the U.S. Olympic soccer team during its unsuccessful qualification campaign for the 1976 Summer Olympics. He scored the second U.S. goal in a 2–3 loss to Bermuda on April 20, 1975. He represented the United States at the 1975 Pan American Games in Mexico. In 1980, he turned professional with the San Francisco Fog of the Major Indoor Soccer League. He moved to the Kansas City Comets for the 1981–1982 season and finished his career with the Memphis Americans in 1983–1984. He continued his military career and retired as a captain. His brother Dan also played professionally.
