= John Hock (American football) =

American football player (1928–2000)

No. 11, 63
- Position: Guard

Personal information
- Born: March 7, 1927; Pittsburgh, Pennsylvania, U.S.
- Died: December 9, 2000 (aged 73); Ridgewood, New Jersey, U.S.
- Listed height: 6 ft 2 in (1.88 m)
- Listed weight: 230 lb (104 kg)

Career information
- High school: Mount Carmel (Los Angeles, California)
- College: Santa Clara
- NFL draft: 1950: 8th round, 99th overall pick

Career history
- Chicago Cardinals (1950); Los Angeles Rams (1953–1957)

Awards and highlights
- Pro Bowl (1956); Second-team All-PCC (1949)

Career NFL statistics
- Games played: 57
- Games started: 29
- Fumble recoveries: 1
- Stats at Pro Football Reference

John Joseph Hock (March 7, 1928 – December 9, 2000) was an American professional football player who was an offensive lineman in the National Football League (NFL) for the Chicago Cardinals from 1950 to 1952 and Los Angeles Rams from 1953 to 1957. He was named to the Pro Bowl one time. Playing college football for the Santa Clara Broncos, he was co-captain of the squad that defeated Bear Bryant's highly-ranked Kentucky team in the 1950 Orange Bowl. Hock also participated in the Olympic Trials for wrestling and was a veteran of the Korean War. After his professional football career ended with a severe knee injury, Hock went on to a successful career as an executive with a variety of freight forwarding and transportation companies. He had a wife, Bernadette "Micki", and they had seven children. Hock died from lung cancer in December 2000.
