= Jerry Hennessy =

American football player (1926–2000)

No. 66, 88
- Position: Defensive end

Personal information
- Born: February 22, 1926; Los Angeles, California, U.S.
- Died: November 3, 2000 (aged 74)
- Listed height: 6 ft 2 in (1.88 m)
- Listed weight: 219 lb (99 kg)

Career information
- High school: Mount Carmel (Los Angeles)
- College: Santa Clara (1946–1949)
- NFL draft: 1950: 13th round, 165th overall pick

Career history
- Chicago Cardinals (1950–1951); Washington Redskins (1952–1953)

Career NFL statistics
- Fumble recoveries: 5
- Safeties: 1
- Stats at Pro Football Reference

Jeremiah Joseph Hennessy (February 22, 1926 – November 3, 2000) was an American professional football end in the National Football League (NFL) for the Chicago Cardinals and the Washington Redskins. He played college football at Santa Clara University and was drafted in the thirteenth round of the 1950 NFL draft.

He would later coach for the Mount Carmel Crusaders.
