= Pat Malley =

American football player and coach (1931–1985)

Biographical details
- Born: February 28, 1931; San Francisco, California, U.S.
- Died: May 18, 1985 (aged 54); Santa Clara, California, U.S.

Playing career
- 1950–1951: Santa Clara
- Positions: Offensive guard, linebacker

Coaching career (HC unless noted)
- 1952: Santa Clara (freshmen)
- 1956–1958: St. Ignatius College Prep (CA)
- 1959–1984: Santa Clara

Administrative career (AD unless noted)
- 1965–1985: Santa Clara

Head coaching record
- Overall: 142–100–3 (college)
- Tournaments: 1–1 (NCAA D-II)

Accomplishments and honors

Championships
- 1 Western Football Conference (1983)

George Patrick Malley (February 28, 1931 – May 18, 1985) was an American football coach. He served as the Santa Clara University head coach from 1959 until his death in 1985.

== Early life and education ==
Born in San Francisco, Malley graduated from St. Ignatius College Preparatory in 1949. Malley then attended the University of Santa Clara, where he played at offensive guard and linebacker on the football team in 1950 and 1951 before graduating from the university in 1953. Malley was part of the Santa Clara 1950 Orange Bowl championship team.

== Coaching career ==
In 1952, Malley coached the Santa Clara freshman team. After graduating from Santa Clara, Malley served in the 4th Armored Division of the United States Army. Malley returned to coaching in 1956 when he became head coach at his alma mater St. Ignatius Prep.

Resurrecting the football program after a seven-year hiatus, the University of Santa Clara hired Malley as head coach in 1959. Malley amassed a 141–100–4 record with only five losing seasons. Malley also added athletic director to his duties at the university in 1965.

Mark Purdy of the San Jose Mercury News credited Malley with a revival of football at Santa Clara after the school relegated its team to the Division II level. Purdy wrote, "Malley was the grandfather or uncle who looked after everyone. The men who played for him still talk of him today in reverent tones."

Malley died of cancer on May 18, 1985. The Pat Malley Fitness and Recreation Center opened on the Santa Clara campus in 1999 was named in his honor. His father, George Malley, played football at Santa Clara and coached the University of San Francisco football team. His son, Terry Malley, succeeded him as Santa Clara head coach.

== Head coaching record ==
=== College ===
Year	Team	Overall	Conference	Standing	Bowl/playoffs
Santa Clara Broncos (NCAA College Division / Division II independent) (1959–1981)
1959	Santa Clara	4–1			
1960	Santa Clara	4–3			
1961	Santa Clara	3–3			
1962	Santa Clara	2–6			
1963	Santa Clara	6–3			
1964	Santa Clara	7–2			
1965	Santa Clara	8–1			
1966	Santa Clara	7–2			
1967	Santa Clara	8–1			
1968	Santa Clara	4–5			
1969	Santa Clara	6–4			
1970	Santa Clara	5–4–1			
1971	Santa Clara	6–4			
1972	Santa Clara	4–4–1			
1973	Santa Clara	4–6			
1974	Santa Clara	7–3			
1975	Santa Clara	6–5			
1976	Santa Clara	7–4			
1977	Santa Clara	2–7–1			
1978	Santa Clara	5–6			
1979	Santa Clara	6–3			
1980	Santa Clara	9–3			L NCAA Division II Semifinal
1981	Santa Clara	2–8			
Santa Clara Broncos (Western Football Conference) (1982–1984)
1982	Santa Clara	7–4	3–1	2nd	
1983	Santa Clara	6–4	2–1	T–1st	
1984	Santa Clara	7–4	1–2	2nd	
Santa Clara:		142–100–3	6–4		
Total:		142–100–3			
National championship Conference title Conference division title or championship game berth
