= Terry Malley =

American football coach (born 1954)

San Jose State Spartans
- Title: Analyst

Personal information
- Born: August 6, 1954 (age 72); Killeen, Texas, U.S.

Career information
- Position: Quarterback
- High school: Bellarmine Prep (San Jose, California)
- College: Santa Clara

Career history

Coaching
- San Jose (CA) Leland HS (1976–1977) Assistant; Hayward (CA) Moreau Catholic HS (1978–1979) Assistant; Santa Clara (1980–1984) Wide receivers & quarterbacks; Santa Clara (1985–1992) Head coach; San Jose SaberCats (1999–2008) Offensive coordinator & assistant head coach; San Jose State (2009) Quarterbacks & assistant head coach for offense; San Jose State (2010) Running backs coach & recruiting coordinator; San Jose State (2011–2012) Wide receivers coach and recruiting coordinator; San Jose State (2013) Tight ends & recruiting coordinator; San Jose State (2014) Wide receivers & recruiting coordinator; San Jose SaberCats (2015) Offensive coordinator; San Jose State (2018-present) Analyst

Operations
- San Jose SaberCats (football operations) (1994); San Jose SaberCats (GM) (1995–2006)

Awards and highlights
- As head coach: Western Football Conference champion (1985); Western Football Conference Coach of the Year (1985); As assistant coach: Military Bowl champion (2012); 4× ArenaBowl champion (2002, 2004, 2007, 2015)

Head coaching record
- Regular season: 47–39–1 (college)

Terence Patrick Malley (born August 6, 1954) is an American football coach.

== Early life and college playing career ==
Terence Patrick Malley was born in Killeen, Texas. Malley comes from a line of football coaches. His father is George Patrick "Pat" Malley (1931–1985), under whom Terry Malley would later become an assistant football coach at the University of Santa Clara; grandfather George L. Malley (1903–1979) served as head coach for the University of San Francisco.

Malley later moved to Saratoga, California and attended Bellarmine College Preparatory in nearby San Jose, graduating in 1972. He lettered in football and baseball at Bellarmine.

At the University of Santa Clara, Malley played quarterback under head coach and father Pat Malley for the Broncos from 1973 to 1976, redshirting one year. Malley graduated from Santa Clara in 1976 with a degree in business management.

== Coaching career ==
Malley began his coaching career at the high school level, starting with Leland High of San Jose in 1976 and 1977, then Moreau Catholic High School in 1978 and 1979. In 1980, Malley joined Pat Malley's coaching staff at Santa Clara as wide receivers and quarterbacks coach.

Following Pat Malley's death in May 1985, Terry Malley succeeded his late father as Santa Clara head coach. Malley led Santa Clara to an 8–2–1 record in 1985 and was named Western Football Conference Coach of the Year. Malley continued to be head coach until 1992, Santa Clara football's final season before the university discontinued the football program. In eight seasons, Malley had a 47–39–1 record at Santa Clara.

Malley returned to the coaching ranks in 1999, joining Darren Arbet's staff on the San Jose SaberCats of the Arena Football League. Until 2008, Malley was offensive coordinator and assistant head coach of the SaberCats, during which the team won the ArenaBowl championships in 2002, 2004, and 2007. During Malley's tenure as offensive coordinator, the SaberCats averaged over 50 points per game most seasons. The 2002 ArenaBowl champion SaberCats led the AFL in offense with 62.7 points per game. The team had the AFL's second-highest scoring average (55.3) in 2004, then the highest again in 2005 (59.1) and third best in 2006 (56.1).

In 2009, Malley had his first college coaching position since his days at Santa Clara, this time as assistant head coach for offense and quarterbacks coach at San Jose State under Dick Tomey. Following Tomey's retirement, new head coach Mike MacIntyre retained Malley in 2010 as running backs coach and recruiting coordinator; Malley would remain recruiting coordinator for the rest of his tenure at San Jose State. In 2011, Malley moved to coaching wide receivers. He helped San Jose State win the 2012 Military Bowl. Malley worked under his third coach at San Jose State when Ron Caragher became head coach in 2013. Under Caragher, Malley coached tight ends in 2013 and wide receivers in 2014.

In 2015, Malley returned to the San Jose SaberCats as offensive coordinator, again under Arbet.

== Administrative career ==
With the San Jose SaberCats, Malley was director of football operations in 1994 and general manager from 1995 to 2006.

== Head coaching record ==
Year	Team	Overall	Conference	Standing	Bowl/playoffs
Santa Clara Broncos (Western Football Conference) (1985–1992)
1985	Santa Clara	8–2–1	4–0–1	1st	
1986	Santa Clara	4–7	2–4	T–4th	
1987	Santa Clara	6–5	3–3	T–3rd	
1988	Santa Clara	7–4	4–2	T–2nd	
1989	Santa Clara	7–4	2–3	T–3rd	
1990	Santa Clara	6–5	2–3	T–3rd	
1991	Santa Clara	5–6	0–5	6th	
1992	Santa Clara	4–6	1–3	6th	
Santa Clara:		47–39–1	18–24–1		
Total:		47–39–1			
National championship Conference title Conference division title or championship game berth
