= Maly =

Malý or Maly, (Czech feminine: Malá) is a Slavic surname. It may refer to:

== Maly ==
- Arturo Maly (1939–2001), Argentine actor
- Gerő Mály (1884–1952), Hungarian actor
- Jakub Malý (1811–1885), Czech writer
- Josef Malý (1894–1943), Czech gymnast
- Joseph Karl Maly (1797–1866), Austrian botanist
- Leandro Maly (born 1976), Argentine volleyball player
- Matúš Malý (born 2001), Slovak footballer
- Michal Malý (born 1987), Czech footballer
- Morgan Maly (born 2002), American basketball player
- Paula Maly (1891–1974), Austrian painter
- Petr Malý (born 1984), Czech footballer
- Petrok Maly (died c. 1539), Italian architect
- Robin Malý (born 1989), Czech ice hockey player
- Theodore Maly (1894–1938), Soviet intelligence officer
- Ulrich Maly (born 1960), German politician
- Václav Malý (born 1950), Czech priest
- Vladimír Malý (born 1952), Czech high jumper

== Mala ==
- Anna Malá
- Pavla Malá, married name of Pavla Tomicová, Czech actress
- Taťána Malá (born 1981), Czech lawyer and politician
- Veronika Malá (born 1994), Czech handballer

== See also ==
- Malley
- Maley
- Mally (disambiguation)
- Mala (disambiguation)
