= James Maley =

British activist

- Born: February 19, 1908; Calton, Glasgow, Scotland
- Died: April 9, 2007 (aged 99); Glasgow, Scotland
- Occupations: Political activist, railway track layer, building labourer
- Known for: International Brigades volunteer in the Spanish Civil War; captured after the Battle of Jarama (1937); King's Own Scottish Borderers veteran, World War II (Burma and India)
- Spouse: Anne Watt (m. March 1948)
- Children: 9, including Willy Maley

James Maley (19 February 1908 – 9 April 2007) was a Scottish communist, political activist, Spanish Civil War combatant and World War II veteran.

== Early years ==
He was born in 1908, one of nine children born to Ned Maley, a native of County Mayo and Anne Sherlock from Glasgow, and raised in Stevenson Street in the Calton district of Glasgow. He was sent to work as a boy to help support his family. Aged 11, he had been at the 'battle of George Square" or 'Bloody Friday' in 1919 when the police attacked a crowd of thousands of striking workers seeking a 40-hour week. His neighborhood was considered a "hotbed of socialism" in the 1920s, which helped radicalize Maley politically, including the inspiring speaker at events at Glasgow Green, politician Jimmy Maxton which helped begin Maley's embrace of socialism, and, after 1932, communism. In 1929 and 1930, at the onset of the Great Depression, Maley lived in Cleveland, Ohio with relatives working in a factory, after his father died. The economic effects of the Depression caused him to return to his native Glasgow.

In 1932, he joined the Communist Party and denounced fascism and "the inequalities and social injustice" in Britain at the time. He too became a speaker at Glasgow Green.

== Spanish Civil War ==
In 1936, Maley was one of 250 who gathered in Glasgow's George Square to join buses and head off to the fight in Spain after hearing La Pasionaria on the radio. Maley said it was like a Celtic supporters outing. There were around 35,000 International Brigades volunteers between 1936 and 1939, fighting for the Spanish Republic. He was in the No.2 Machine Gun Company when captured after hiding in olive groves for two days after the Battle of Jarama in February 1937 when General Francisco Franco's nationalists were rebuffed in Madrid. Maley recalled how unprepared and vulnerable the volunteer forces were:

After 200 yards going forward, the retreat was coming back and going down past us and we were going through. There were soldiers running past us and we were going up. And there were soldiers of the British Battalion dropping as we were going up. Without firing a shot they were getting killed.

Maley was sentenced to 20 years imprisonment and held in Talavera de la Reina and Salamanca prisons. Prisoners were filed for newsreels, and Maley's mother (who had thought him dead) saw this in the local cinema and asked to keep the images.

As a captured "foreigner", Maley would normally have been executed immediately. However, the edict was not carried out in the case of British prisoners of war. This was due in part to pressure from the British government citing the Geneva Convention, and, in part, thanks to Italian pressure for "swaps" of British POWs for Italian soldiers being held by the Spanish republican government. Maley was finally released in a prisoner swap. At his mother's request, he did not return to Spain.

== World War II ==
After Germany's attack on the Soviet Union in Operation Barbarossa, Maley joined the King's Own Scottish Borderers in 1941; serving in Burma and India.

After he was demobbed, Maley worked for the next dozen years laying tracks for British Railways, and, afterwards, as a building labourer for the Glasgow Corporation. He remained politically active, especially as a trade unionist and tenants' association campaigner.

== Family ==
He married Anne Watt in March 1948. They had nine children. Although he had been raised Catholic, Maley sent his nine children to non-denominational schools. He often borrowed books from the Book Exchange at Gilmorehill, giving his children a week to read them before taking them back in return for others.

The story of Maley's capture in Spain and the strange way that the family found out he was still alive inspired a play written by two of his sons, John and Willy, From the Calton to Catalonia. It was first performed in December 1990 in the Lithgow Theatre, Glasgow.

== Death ==
James Maley died on 9 April 2007 in his native Glasgow from pneumonia, aged 99, survived by, in his immediate family, his wife, nine children and five grandchildren. His death was marked by his fellow Celtic Football Club fans, even though many were unaware of his story.

== See also ==
- International Brigades
- Spanish Civil War
