= Hall Haynes =

American football player (1928–1988)

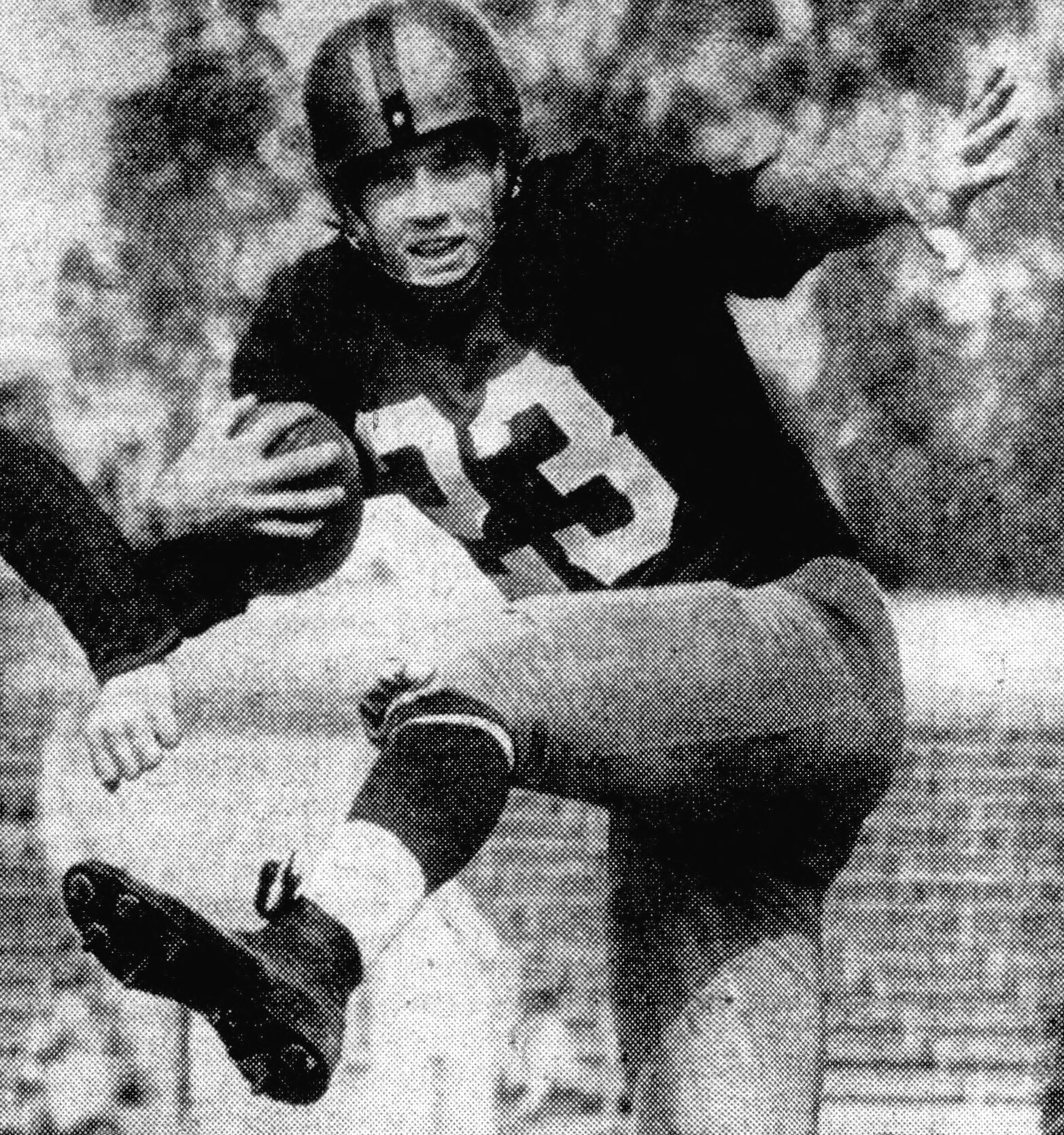
- Haynes in 1950

No. 23, 22
- Position: Cornerback

Personal information
- Born: October 3, 1928; Duncan, Oklahoma, U.S.
- Died: June 15, 1988 (aged 59); Santa Clara County, California, U.S.
- Listed height: 6 ft 0 in (1.83 m)
- Listed weight: 187 lb (85 kg)

Career information
- High school: Pasadena (Pasadena, California)
- College: Santa Clara
- NFL draft: 1950: 2nd round, 19th overall pick

Career history
- Washington Redskins (1950, 1953); Los Angeles Rams (1954–1955)

Awards and highlights
- 2× Second-team All-PCC (1948, 1949)

Career NFL statistics
- Interceptions: 5
- Fumble recoveries: 2
- Total touchdowns: 1
- Stats at Pro Football Reference

Hall Gibson Haynes (October 3, 1928 – June 15, 1988) was an American professional football cornerback in the National Football League (NFL) for the Washington Redskins and the Los Angele Rams. He played college football at Santa Clara University and was drafted in the second round of the 1950 NFL draft. He played four seasons in the NFL.

== College ==
In college, Haynes played for the Santa Clara Broncos. In his junior season, he was a top scorer and kicked an average of 42.4 yards. In his senior season, he led the Broncos' to the Orange Bowl championship over the Kentucky Wildcats. He finished that season with eight touchdowns and gained 532 yards in 11 tries. He also got to play in the Chicago College All-Star Game that season, and was named to the All-Far West Eleven.

Haynes graduated with a degree in political science. He was inducted into Santa Clara's Athletics Hall of Fame in 1962.

== Professional career ==
=== Washington Redskins ===
Haynes was Washington's second choice (19th overall) in the 1950 NFL Draft. After 1950, he then didn't play for two years, as he was on a tour of duty, part of which he served in Korea, in combat. He returned to football in 1953. That year, he established himself as one of the best defensive backs in the league. He was paid less than $9,000 that season.

In 1954, at the age of 25, Haynes retired to take a post as the San Jose civil defense director and to be with his family.

=== Los Angeles Rams ===
At some point in 1955, Haynes joined the LA Rams. In 1955, Haynes was out with a back injury. In 1956, he retired to go into business.

== Personal life ==
Hall was married, and had two children.
