= Santa Clara Broncos football =

Defunct football program formerly representing Santa Clara University

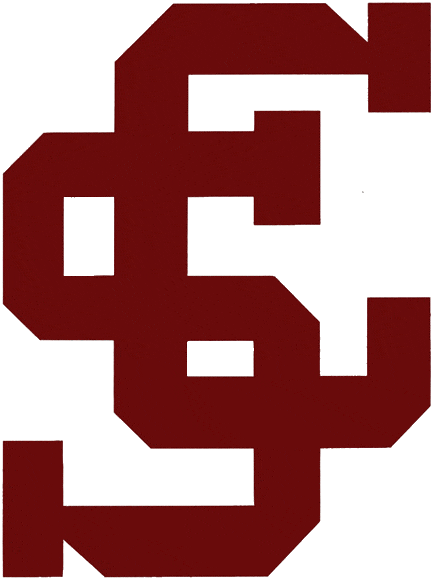
- First season: 1896; 130 years ago
- Last season: 1992; 34 years ago
- Location: Santa Clara, California
- Stadium: Kezar Stadium (in San Francisco, 1925–1952); Buck Shaw Stadium (1962–1992) (capacity: 6,800)
- NCAA division: Division II
- Conference: Division II independent
- Colors: Maroon and white
- All-time record: 352–244–28 (.587)
- Bowl record: 3–0 (1.000)

Conference championships
- 2 (1983, 1985)
- Consensus All-Americans: 2 (1938, 1939)
- Rivalries: St. Mary's Gaels (Little Big Game); California Golden Bears; Stanford Cardinal; San Francisco Dons

The Santa Clara Broncos football program was the intercollegiate American football team for Santa Clara University located in Santa Clara, California. Santa Clara played its first football game against St. Mary's College in San Francisco in 1896. Santa Clara compiled an all-time record of 352–244–28 (.587).

The team was known as ‘The S.C.U. Elevens’ from 1896 to 1907, The football program went on hiatus from 1908 to 1918. The football program returned as the Santa Clara "Missionites" in 1919, and were newly named the ‘Broncos’ in 1923.

After the 1992 season, the Santa Clara football program was discontinued due to new NCAA regulations which mandated all sports be played at the same level at each university, as well as due to the high cost of funding football. Santa Clara had fielded all Division I teams with the exception of the Division II football team, and elected not to field a team at the Division I-AA level.

Santa Clara played in three major bowl games and won all three: 1937 Sugar Bowl, 1938 Sugar Bowl, and 1950 Orange Bowl.

== Conference affiliations ==
- 1896–1952, 1959–1981, Independent
- 1973–81, Division II Independent
- 1982–91, Western Football Conference
- 1992, Division II Independent

== Championships ==
=== Conference championships ===
Title no.	Year	Conference	Coach	Overall record	Conference record
1	1983	Western Football Conference (Note: Title shared.)	Pat Malley	6–4–0	2–1
2	1985	Western Football Conference	Terry Malley	8–2–1	4–0–1

== Playoff appearances ==
=== NCAA Division II ===
The Broncos made one appearance in the NCAA Division II playoffs. They had a combined record of 1–1.

Year	Round	Opponent	Result
1980	Quarterfinals	Northern Michigan	27–26
1980	Semifinals	Cal Poly	14–38

== Bowl game appearances ==
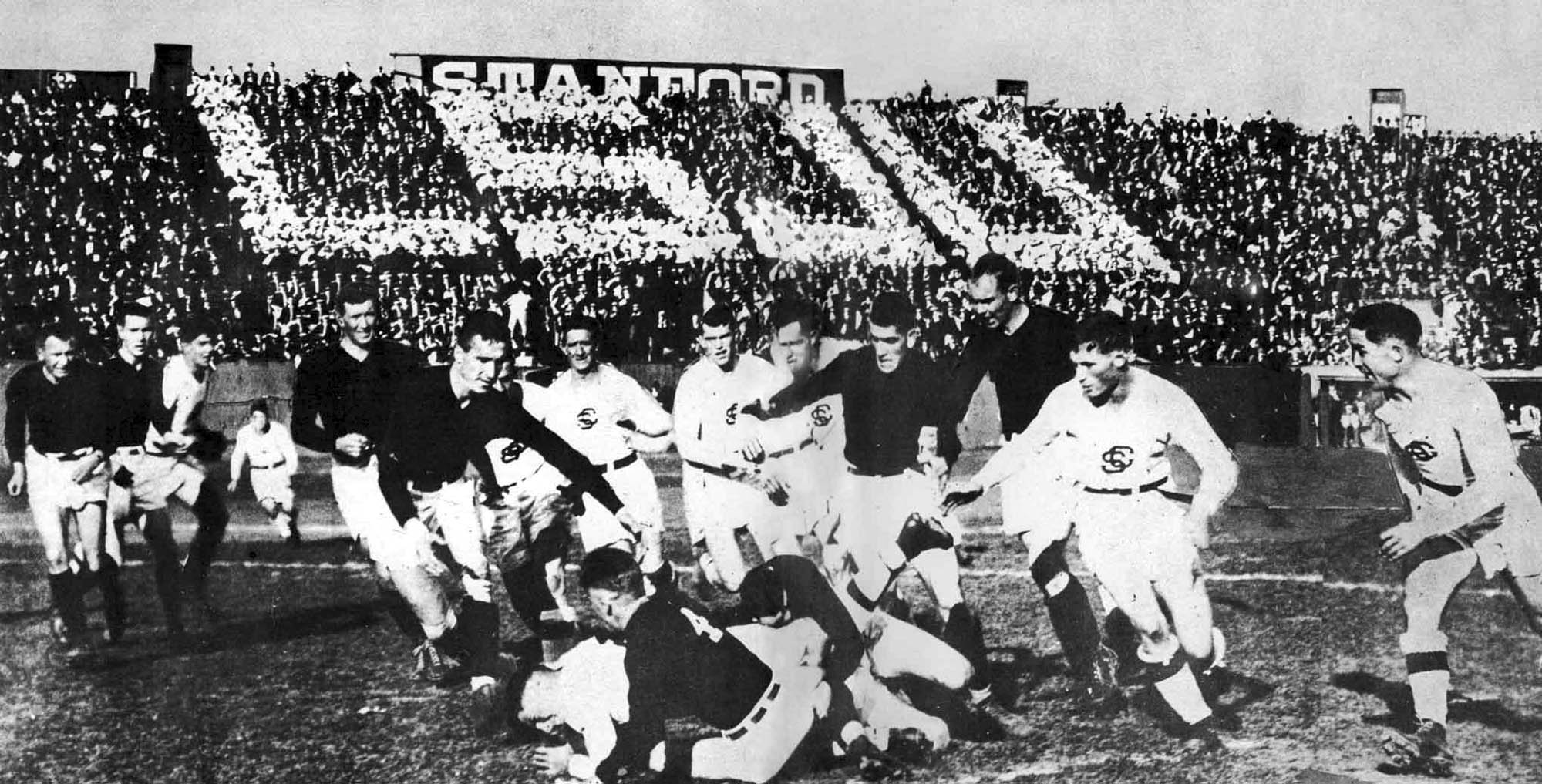
Santa Clara played the Atlantic Coast Big Game (rugby football rules) from 1915 to 1917, replacing University of California which had resumed football

Season	Date	Bowl	City	W/L	Opponent	PF	PA	Head coach
1936	January 1, 1937	Sugar	New Orleans	W	LSU	21	14	Buck Shaw
1937	January 1, 1938	Sugar	New Orleans	W	LSU	6	0	Buck Shaw
1949	January 2, 1950	Orange	Miami	W	Kentucky	21	13	Len Casanova
Total		3 bowl games			3–0	48	27	

== AP Poll Rankings ==
1937 Final Poll No. 6
1938 Final Poll No. 9

== Rivalries ==
=== St. Mary’s ===
'The Little Big Game' was played annually between the 2 rival Catholic institutions located in the San Francisco Bay Area. The name was reference to 'The Big Game' rivalry between larger Bay Area universities, Stanford and Berkeley.

=== San Francisco ===
Rivalry with a 3rd San Francisco Bay Area Jesuit Institution.

== College Football Hall of Fame ==
College Football Hall of Fame
Name	Position	Year	Inducted	Ref
Nello Falaschi	QB	1934–1936	1971	
Buck Shaw	Head Coach	1929–1942	1972	
Tom Fears	WR/ DE	1941–1942	1976	
Len Casanova	P / Head Coach	1923–1949	1977	
Brent Jones	WR / TE	1982–1985	2002	

=== Nello Falaschi ===
Quarterback, Nello "Flash" Falaschi led the Broncos to a 21–14 upset over LSU in the 1937 Sugar Bowl. Little Santa Clara was a decided underdog going against Louisiana State.

=== Buck Shaw ===
Buck Shaw's teams compiled a record of 47–10–4, including a span of 16 consecutive wins. The 1937 Santa Clara team allowed only nine points over a nine-game campaign. Highlighting Shaw's tenure at the Bronco helm were a pair of Sugar Bowl victories over heavily-favored Louisiana State, 21–14, in 1937, and 6–0, in 1938.

=== Tom Fears ===
Tom Fears was a two-way end who played for Santa Clara in 1941–1942. While with the 7–2 1942 Santa Clara Broncos football team, Fears helped Santa Clara defeat Utah and three Pacific Coast Conference schools in a row in Stanford, Cal and Oregon State. During that 1942 season Fears won All-Pacific Coast honors before joining the Air Force in World War II.

=== Len Casanova ===
Leonard Casanova was a skilled Punter for Santa Clara in 1923. Standing on his own one-yard line, he punted a ball that went out of bounds on rival St. Mary's one yard line. Total distance, 98 yards. His career as head coach began in 1946 and covered four years at Santa Clara, one at Pittsburgh, 16 at Oregon. His 1949 Santa Clara Broncos football team beat Bear Bryant's Kentucky in the 1950 Orange Bowl.

=== Brent Jones ===
Brent Jones helped the Broncos to two Western Football Conference championships and was named to the all-conference team three times.

== Pro Football Hall of Fame ==
Pro Football Hall of Fame
Name	Position	Year	Inducted
Tom Fears	WR/ DE	1941–1942	1970

Born in Guadalajara, Mexico, Fears was the son of a Mexican mother, Carmen Valdés, and an American father, mining engineer Charles William Fears. Selected as a defensive back by the Los Angeles Rams in the eleventh round (103rd overall) of the 1945 NFL draft, he is distinguished as being the first Mexican-born player to be drafted into the National Football League. Fears quickly made his mark as a wide receiver, while also displaying his versatility by playing on defense. During his first three seasons at the professional level, he led all NFL receivers in catches, and broke the league's single-season record with 77 catches in 1949.

== Individual awards and honors ==
=== National awards ===
- Amos Alonzo Stagg Award

Len Casanova (1990)

- Bart Starr Award

Brent Jones (1998)

- Division II Football Team of the Quarter Century (1975–2000)

Brent Jones

=== Conference awards ===
- Western Football Conference Coach of the Year

Terry Malley (1985)

- Western Football Conference Offensive Player of the Year

Brent Jones (1985)

== All Americans ==
- Francis "Hands" Slavich, DE- 1932 (AP-1st Team, UP-1st Team, INS-3rd Team)
- Frank Sobrero, HB- 1933 (UP-2nd Team)
- Paglia, FB- 1933 (UP-2nd Team)
- Nello Falaschi, Quarterback- 1936 (INS-1st Team, AA-1st Team, AAB-1st Team) (College Football HOF)
- Nello Falaschi, Half Back- 1936 (WC-1st Team, AP-3rd Team) (College Football HOF)
- Phil Dougherty, G 1937 (INS-1st Team)
- Phil Dougherty, C 1937 (CP-3rd Team)
- Alvord Wolff, Tackle- 1937 (NEA-3rd Team)
- Alvord Wolff, Tackle- 1938 Consensus 1st Team (AP-1st, UP-1st, NEA-1st, 1ns-1st, NW-1st, SN-1st, PW-1st, ID-2nd)
- John Schiechl, C- 1939 Consensus 1st Team (AAB-1st, AP-1st, CO-1st, CP-1st, NEA-1st, WC-1st, UP-2nd, NYS-2nd, INS-2nd)
- Bill Anahu, DE- 1939 (INS-2nd Team)
- Alyn Beals, DE- 1941 (NEA-3rd Team)
- Alyn Beals, DE- 1942 (CP-2nd Team)
- Jesse Freitas, QB- 1942 (AP-3rd Team)
- Vern Sterling, G- 1948 (AP-3rd Team, FWAA-3rd)
- Vern Sterling, G 1949 (FWAA-3rd Team, PLAY-1st)
- Vern Sterling, C 1949 (AP-3rd Team)
- Dan Pastorini, Quarterback- 1970 (1st/2nd Little All American)
- Brent Jones, TE/WR -1985 (AP-1st Team) (College Football HOF)

== Notable alumni ==
- Bryan Barker
- Dick Bassi
- Alyn Beals
- Mike Carey
- Ken Casanega
- Len Casanova
- Steve Cisowski
- Doug Cosbie
- Phil Dougherty
- Nello Falaschi
- Dan Farrell
- Eddie Forrest
- Jesse Freitas
- Visco Grgich
- Hall Haynes
- Jerry Hennessy
- John Hock
- Gary Hoffman
- Martin Jenkins
- Brent Jones
- Mike Kellogg
- Pat Malley
- Gern Nagler
- Mike Nott
- Dan Pastorini
- John Schiechl
- Alvord Wolff
- Ellery Williams
