= Dan Salvemini =

American soccer player

Personal information
- Date of birth: April 10, 1957 (age 69)
- Place of birth: San Francisco, California, U.S.
- Height: 5 ft 11 in (1.80 m)
- Position: Defender

College career
Years	Team	Apps	(Gls)
1975–1978	California Golden Bears		

Senior career*
Years	Team	Apps	(Gls)
1980	Philadelphia Fury	23	(1)
1981–1982	Philadelphia Fever (indoor)	39	(8)
1983–1984	Memphis Americans	28	(9)
1985	San Jose Earthquakes		
- * Club domestic league appearances and goals

Dan Salvemini (born April 10, 1957) is an American former soccer player who spent time in the North American Soccer League, Major Indoor Soccer League and Western Soccer Alliance.

== Youth ==
Salvemini attended the University of California, Berkeley, where he played on the Golden Bears soccer team from 1975 to 1978. He finished his career at Cal with 54 goals and 17 assists, placing him second on the career goals and points lists. He also gained third team All-American recognition in 1976, 1977 and 1978. Salvemini was inducted into the Golden Bears Hall of Fame in 1990.

== Professional ==
In January 1979, the Washington Diplomats selected Salvemini in the first round (sixth overall) of the North American Soccer League draft (NASL draft). However, he injured his knee and had surgery a few days after the draft. He sat out the entire 1979 season. In 1980, Salvemini played a single season with the Philadelphia Fury in the NASL. He spent the 1981–1982 season with the Philadelphia Fever in the Major Indoor Soccer League. He played an unknown number of seasons with the Memphis Americans in the Major Indoor Soccer League. He also played for the San Jose Earthquakes during the 1985 Western Alliance Challenge Series. His brother, Len, also played professionally.
