= 1950 Orange Bowl =

American college football game

- 16th Orange Bowl
- Burdine Stadium in Miami, Florida, hosted the Orange Bowl.
Kentucky Wildcats	Santa Clara Broncos
(9–2)	(7–2–1)
SEC	Independent
13	21
Head coach: Bear Bryant	Head coach: Len Casanova
AP 11	AP 15
	1	2	3	4	Total
Kentucky	0	7	0	6	13
Santa Clara	0	0	14	7	21
- Date: January 2, 1950
- Season: 1949
- Stadium: Burdine Stadium
- Location: Miami, Florida
- Favorite: Kentucky (–5½)
- Referee: Fred Koster (SEC; split crew: SEC, Pacific Coast)
- Attendance: 64,816

1950 Orange Bowl was the sixteenth edition of the bowl game, played at Burdine Stadium in Miami, Florida, on Monday, January 2, 1950. The game featured the Kentucky Wildcats of the Southeastern Conference and the Santa Clara Broncos, an independent from northern California.

Santa Clara (7–2–1) was ranked fifteenth in the final AP poll, released in early December. Kentucky (9–2, 4–1 SEC) had been ranked as high as sixth in the AP poll during the season but was ranked eleventh entering the game.

== The Game ==
The game was scoreless until the second quarter, following a Santa Clara turnover, as Kentucky's John Netoskie recovered a fumble near midfield. A 14-play, 51-yard drive ended with a touchdown from two yards out by Wilbur Jamerson; Bobby Brooks' point after gave Kentucky a 7–0 lead, a score that stood at the half after a 45-yard Babe Parilli-to-Bill Leskovar pass put Kentucky on the Santa Clara 3-yard line with Santa Clara stopping two rushing attempts as time expired. Kentucky coach Bear Bryant later said he should have called a passing play in order to allow for a field goal attempt if a touchdown was not scored.

In the third quarter, a poor 9-yard Kentucky punt gave Santa Clara possession on their own 46-yard line. John Pasco threw 25 yards to Larry Williams, which led to a one-yard touchdown run by Pasco to tie the game at seven. A second Santa Clara touchdown came after a pass interference call against Kentucky helped set up a 4-yard touchdown run by Hall Haynes.

Early in the fourth quarter, Parilli threw a 52-yard touchdown pass to Emery Clark but Brooks missed the point after, and Santa Clara retained a one-point lead at 14–13 with twelve minutes remaining. With less than one minute left, Santa Clara's Bernie Vogel scored on a 16-yard run for the final score and a 21–13 win for the Broncos.

Bill Leskovar had 83 rushing yards (on 22 carries) for Kentucky.

== Aftermath ==
Reportedly, part of the reason the Wildcats lost was from fatigue of being overworked in two-a-day practices every day from the moment the team got off the plane in Cocoa Beach two weeks prior up until the day before the game (with the exception of Christmas Eve and Day). Bryant later admitted it wasn't the greatest coaching move of his career and refused to lay any blame on his players for the loss.

It was Santa Clara's third and final bowl win; they later played in Division II, then dropped the football program after the 1992 season.
