= Stan Parrish =

American football player and coach (1946–2022)

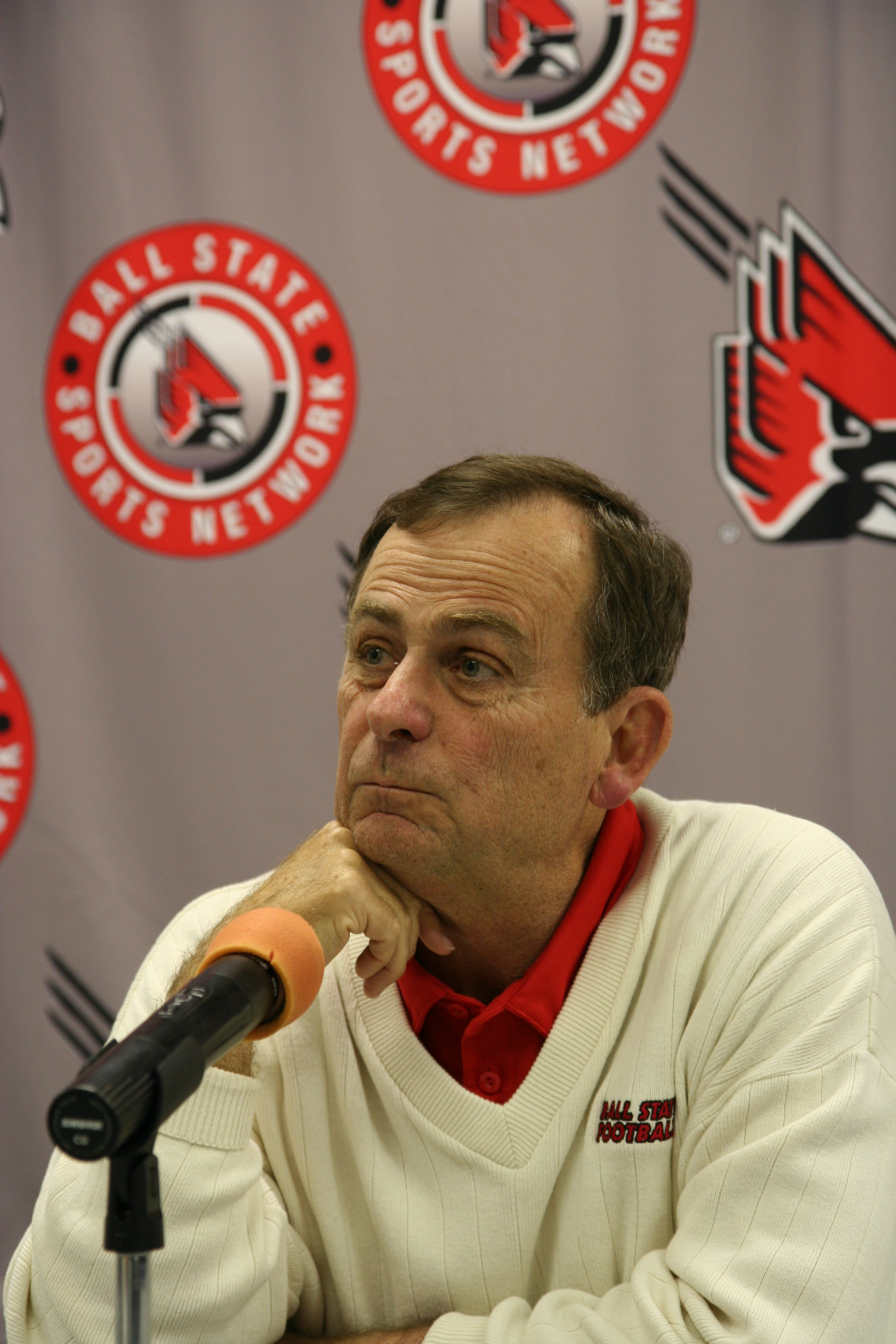
- Parrish at Ball State in 2009

Biographical details
- Born: September 20, 1946; Cleveland, Ohio, U.S.
- Died: April 3, 2022 (aged 75); Ann Arbor, Michigan, U.S.

Playing career
- 1965–1968: Heidelberg
- Position: Defensive back

Coaching career (HC unless noted)
- 1969–1971: Windham HS (OH) (assistant)
- 1972–1974: Windham HS (OH)
- 1975–1976: Purdue (GA)
- 1977: Wabash (assistant)
- 1978–1982: Wabash
- 1983: Purdue (assistant)
- 1984–1985: Marshall
- 1986–1988: Kansas State
- 1990–1992: Rutgers (OC/QB)
- 1993–1995: Rutgers (AHC/OC/QB)
- 1996–1999: Michigan (QB)
- 2000–2001: Michigan (OC/QB)
- 2002–2003: Tampa Bay Buccaneers (QB)
- 2005: Ball State (QB)
- 2006–2008: Ball State (OC/QB)
- 2008–2010: Ball State
- 2011–2012: Siena Heights (QB)
- 2013: Eastern Michigan (interim HC/OC/QB)

Head coaching record
- Overall: 64–62–3 (college)
- Bowls: 0–1

Stanley Paul Parrish Jr. (September 20, 1946 – April 3, 2022) was an American football coach and player. He was the head coach at Ball State University from 2009 to 2010. Parrish was previously the head coach at Wabash College, Kansas State and Marshall University. He was an offensive coordinator at Ball State and the University of Michigan, and had a lengthy career working primarily with quarterbacks.

As an assistant coach, Parrish was a member of the 1997 National Champion Michigan Wolverines and Super Bowl XXXVII champion Tampa Bay Buccaneers.

== Early life ==
Parrish was born on September 20, 1946, in Cleveland, Ohio. He attended Valley Forge High School in Parma Heights, Ohio, and graduated in 1964. Parrish then attended Heidelberg College, where he played football as a defensive back from 1965 to 1968. He graduated in 1969 with a bachelor's degree.

== Coaching career ==
After graduating from Heidelberg, Parrish began his coaching career at Windham High School in Windham, Ohio in 1969. He coached the Bombers first as an assistant, then as head coach. He led the Bombers to their first ever Ohio high school football playoff berth in his final year, 1974; only four teams in each division qualified in those early years of the playoffs. In 1975, Parrish joined the staff at Purdue University as a graduate assistant.

=== Wabash ===
Parrish had a highly successful 42–3–1 stay as head coach at Division III Wabash College from 1979 to 1982, where he coached future NFL player Pete Metzelaars. Parrish was the 29th head coach for the Little Giants, and he held that position for five seasons, from 1978 until 1982. As of the 2007 season, Parrish's record at Wabash is ranked second in winning percentage (.924). While at Wabash, Parrish also coached the tennis team. Parrish is enshrined in the Wabash College Athletic Hall of Fame.

=== Marshall ===
In 1984, Parrish was hired as head football coach at Marshall University. In two years at Marshall, Parrish helped establish a lasting winning tradition for the school. In 1984, Parrish led Marshall to a 6–5 record, Marshall's first winning season in twenty years and the first since the team's 1970 air disaster. The following year, the Thundering Herd went undefeated at home and earned a #3 NCAA Division I-AA national ranking early in the season before fading to a 7–3–1 record. Partly as a result of the back-to-back winning seasons, plans for a new stadium at Marshall were in place before the next season began. Parrish left Marshall following the 1985 season to take the head coaching job at Kansas State University.

=== Kansas State ===
Parrish was not able to repeat his success at Marshall in his three years as head coach of K-State. From 1986 to 1988 Parrish posted a 2–30–1 mark (.076 winning percentage). His last win at Kansas State came on October 26, 1986, over Kansas; afterward he went 0–26–1, including K-State's first winless records on the field since 1966. Parrish was fired after the 1988 season, and replaced by Bill Snyder.

=== Rutgers, Michigan, Tampa Bay Buccaneers ===
After leaving Kansas State, Parrish served as an assistant head coach at Rutgers University from 1990 to 1995. For the following six years, he coached at the University of Michigan, where he served as offensive coordinator in 2000 and 2001. As the quarterbacks coach, he worked with Brian Griese, Tom Brady, and Drew Henson. Parrish helped the 1997 Wolverines to victory in the Rose Bowl and the school's 11th national championship. Parrish spent the 2002 and 2003 seasons as the quarterbacks coach of the NFL's Tampa Bay Buccaneers. In 2002, he tutored starting quarterback Brad Johnson, who led Tampa Bay to a 12–4 regular-season record and the first Super Bowl title in the franchise's history.

=== Ball State ===
After a year away from the game, Parrish was hired by Ball State head coach Brady Hoke as quarterback coach at Ball State. The following season, he was promoted to offensive coordinator. In the 2008 season, Ball State had a historically successful campaign, winning their first 12 games before falling to Buffalo in the MAC championship game. Hoke used this success as a springboard to securing the head coaching job at San Diego State, resigning prior to the team's appearance in the GMAC Bowl. Rather than follow Hoke to San Diego State, Parrish succeeded Hoke at Ball State. This was Parrish's first head coaching position in 20 years. At Ball State, Parrish compiled a 6–19 record, including two losses to FCS schools and a loss to a team who had an 18-game losing streak. He was fired after the 2010 season.

=== Siena Heights ===
In April 2011, Parrish was appointed the quarterbacks coach at Siena Heights University prior to the inaugural season of the school's new football program under head coach Jim Lyall. His role was on a voluntary basis, which allowed him to coach without any recruiting duties.

=== Eastern Michigan ===
In January 2013 Parrish was named the offensive coordinator and quarterbacks coach for Eastern Michigan under head coach Ron English for the upcoming season. Stan Parrish was named the interim head coach when English was fired after a 1–8 start to the 2013 season. The Eagles won their first game under Parrish's guidance against Western Michigan, but lost the final two games of the season against Bowling Green and Central Michigan.

== Personal life and death ==
He was married to Ruth Purdy, with whom he had a daughter and son. Parrish died on April 3, 2022 in Ann Arbor, Michigan, at the age of 75.

== Head coaching record ==
Year	Team	Overall	Conference	Standing	Bowl/playoffs
Wabash Little Giants (NCAA Division III independent) (1978–1982)
1978	Wabash	8–1			
1979	Wabash	8–1			
1980	Wabash	8–0–1			
1981	Wabash	8–1			
1982	Wabash	10–0			
Wabash:		42–3–1			
Marshall Thundering Herd (Southern Conference) (1984–1985)
1984	Marshall	6–5	2–4	T–5th	
1985	Marshall	7–3–1	3–3–1	4th	
Marshall:		13–8–1	5–7–1		
Kansas State Wildcats (Big Eight Conference) (1986–1988)
1986	Kansas State	2–9	1–6	8th	
1987	Kansas State	0–10–1	0–6–1	T–7th	
1988	Kansas State	0–11	0–7	8th	
Kansas State:		2–30–1	1–19–1		
Ball State Cardinals (Mid-American Conference) (2008–2010)
2008	Ball State	0–1	0–0		L GMAC
2009	Ball State	2–10	2–6	5th (West)	
2010	Ball State	4–8	3–5	4th (West)	
Ball State:		6–19	5–11		
Eastern Michigan Eagles (Mid-American Conference) (2013)
2013	Eastern Michigan	1–2	1–2	T–5th (West)	
Eastern Michigan:		1–2	1–2		
Total:		64–62–3			
National championship Conference title Conference division title or championship game berth
^{#}Rankings from final Coaches Poll.; ^{°}Rankings from final AP Poll.

Note: Parrish served as head coach for Ball State in the 2009 GMAC Bowl after Brady Hoke stepped down. Note: Parrish served as interim head coach for Eastern Michigan after Ron English was fired.
