= 2022 San Diego State Aztecs football team =

American college football season

2022 San Diego State Aztecs football

Hawaii Bowl, L 23–25 vs. Middle Tennessee
- Conference: Mountain West Conference
- West Division
- Record: 7–6 (5–3 MW)
- Head coach: Brady Hoke (5th season)
- Offensive coordinator: Jeff Hecklinski (3rd season)
- Offensive scheme: Multiple
- Defensive coordinator: Kurt Mattix (3rd season)
- Base defense: 4–2–5
- Captains: Jesse Matthews; Patrick McMorris; Jonah Tavai; Alama Uluave
- Home stadium: Snapdragon Stadium

2022 Mountain West Conference football standings
	Conf.			Overall
Team	W		L	W		L
Mountain Division
Boise State xy	8	–	0	10	–	4
Air Force	5	–	3	10	–	3
Wyoming	5	–	3	7	–	6
Utah State	5	–	3	6	–	7
Colorado State	3	–	5	3	–	9
New Mexico	0	–	8	2	–	10
West Division
No. 24 Fresno State xy$	7	–	1	10	–	4
San Diego State	5	–	3	7	–	6
San Jose State	5	–	3	7	–	5
UNLV	3	–	5	5	–	7
Hawaii	2	–	6	3	–	10
Nevada	0	–	8	2	–	10
Championship: Fresno State 28, Boise State 16
$ – Conference champion; x – Division champion/co-champions; y – Championship game participant; Rankings from AP Poll

The 2022 San Diego State Aztecs football team represented the San Diego State University as a member of the Mountain West Conference during the 2022 NCAA Division I FBS football season. They were led by head coach Brady Hoke, who was coaching his fourth season with the team. The Aztecs played their home games at the new Snapdragon Stadium in San Diego, California.

== Schedule ==
San Diego State and the Mountain West Conference announced the 2022 football schedule on February 16, 2022.

Date	Time	Opponent	Site	TV	Result	Attendance
September 3	12:30 p.m.	Arizona*	Snapdragon Stadium; San Diego, CA	CBS	L 20–38	34,046
September 10	5:00 p.m.	Idaho State*	Snapdragon Stadium; San Diego, CA	MW Network	W 38–7	27,865
September 17	7:00 p.m.	at No. 14 Utah*	Rice–Eccles Stadium; Salt Lake City, UT	ESPN2	L 7–35	51,602
September 24	12:30 p.m.	Toledo*	Snapdragon Stadium; San Diego, CA	FS1	W 17–14	27,108
September 30	5:00 p.m.	at Boise State	Albertsons Stadium; Boise, ID	FS1	L 13–35	34,910
October 8	7:30 p.m.	Hawaii	Snapdragon Stadium; San Diego, CA	CBSSN	W 16–14	33,073
October 22	7:30 p.m.	at Nevada	Mackay Stadium; Reno, NV	CBSSN	W 23–7	16,363
October 29	7:30 p.m.	at Fresno State	Bulldog Stadium; Fresno, CA (rivalry)	FS1	L 28–32	37,107
November 5	4:00 p.m.	UNLV	Snapdragon Stadium; San Diego, CA	CBSSN	W 14–10	28,854
November 12	7:30 p.m.	San Jose State	Snapdragon Stadium; San Diego, CA	FS1	W 43–27	28,406
November 18	6:45 p.m.	at New Mexico	University Stadium; Albuquerque, NM	FS1	W 34–10	14,309
November 26	6:00 p.m.	Air Force	Snapdragon Stadium; San Diego, CA	CBSSN	L 3–13	25,223
December 24	5:00 p.m.	vs. Middle Tennessee*	Clarence T. C. Ching Athletics Complex; Honolulu, Hawaii (Hawaii Bowl)	ESPN	L 23–25	6,605
*Non-conference game; Rankings from AP Poll (and CFP Rankings, after November 1) - Released prior to game; All times are in Pacific time

== Game summaries ==
=== Arizona ===
Arizona Wildcats vs San Diego State Aztecs

Quarter	1	2	3	4	Total
Wildcats	10	14	7	7	38
Aztecs	0	10	10	0	20

at Snapdragon Stadium, San Diego, CA

- Date: September 03, 2022
- Game time: 12:30 p.m.
- Game weather: Sunny; 100 °F (38 °C); Wind: SW 4 MPH
- Game attendance: 34,046
- Referee: Francisco Villar
- TV announcers (CBS): Brad Nessler (play-by-play), Gary Danielson (analyst), Jenny Dell (sideline)

Statistics	Arizona	San Diego State
First downs	25	14
Plays–yards	74–461	58–232
Rushes–yards	39–162	42–170
Passing yards	299	62
Passing: comp–att–int	22-35-1	7-16-1
Time of possession	32:37	27:23

Team	Category	Player	Statistics
Arizona	Passing	Jayden de Laura	22/35, 299 yds, 4 TD, INT
Arizona	Rushing	DJ Williams	14 car, 88 yds, TD
Arizona	Receiving	Jacob Cowing	8 rec, 152 yds, 3 TD
San Diego State	Passing	Braxton Burmeister	5/10, 61 yds, TD, INT
San Diego State	Rushing	Cam Davis	8 car, 39 yds
San Diego State	Receiving	Kenan Christon	2 rec, 19 yds

Scoring summary

Quarter	Time	Drive			Team	Scoring information	Score	
Quarter	Time	Plays	Yards	TOP	Team	Scoring information	Arizona	SDSU
1st	7:06	16	66	5:35	ARIZ	25-yard field goal by Tyler Loop (#33)	3	0
1st	3:19	7	40	2:59	ARIZ	Jacob Cowing (#2) 17-yard touchdown reception from Jayden de Laura (#7), Tyler Loop (#33) kick good	10	0
2nd	13:31	11	48	4:48	SDSU	44-yard field goal by Jack Browning (#13)	10	3
2nd	10:19	8	75	3:12	ARIZ	Tetairoa McMillan (#4) 6-yard touchdown reception from Jayden de Laura (#7), Tyler Loop (#32) kick good	17	3
2nd	4:49	7	32	3:37	SDSU	Tyrell Shavers (#14) 11-yard touchdown reception from Braxton Burmeister (#5), Jack Browning (#13) kick good	17	10
2nd	0:28	6	54	2:07	ARIZ	Jacob Cowing (#2) 4-yard touchdown reception from Jayden de Laura (#7), Tyler Loop (#33) kick good	24	10
3rd	12:40	5	75	2:20	ARIZ	Jacob Cowing (#2) 25-yard touchdown reception from Jayden de Laura (#7), Tyler Loop (#33) kick good	31	10
3rd	7:46	3	-2	1:03	SDSU	Jaylon Armstead (#38) 0-yd return of blocked punt, Jack Browning (#13) kick good	31	17
3rd	3:36	8	37	3:19	SDSU	23-yard field goal by Jack Browning (#13)	31	20
4th	13:02	11	75	5:34	ARIZ	DJ Williams (#32) 10-yard touchdown run, Tyler Loop (#33) kick good	38	20
"TOP" = time of possession. For other American football terms, see Glossary of American football.							38	20

=== Idaho State ===
Game Two – Idaho State Bengals (0–1) at San Diego State Aztecs (0–1)

Quarter	1	2	3	4	Total
Bengals	7	0	0	0	7
Aztecs	14	7	3	14	38

at Snapdragon Stadium • San Diego, California

- Date: Saturday, September 10, 2022
- Game time: 6:00 p.m. MST
- Game weather: Partly cloudy, 74°F
- Game attendance: 27,865
- TV announcers (MW Network): Marius Payton (play by play), Bill Doleman (analyst), Natalie Vickers (sideline)

Game information

First quarter

- (14:46) ISU - Xavier Guillory 75 yard pass from Tyler Vander Waal, Ian Hershey kick
- (11:58) SDSU - Jordan Byrd 66 yard punt return, Jack Browning kick
- (5:01) SDSU - Braxton Burmeister 47 yard run, Jack Browning kick

Second quarter

- (14:48) SDSU - Jordan Byrd 53 yard run, Jack Browning kick

Third quarter

- (2:32) SDSU - Jack Browning 20 yard field goal

Fourth quarter

- (8:35) SDSU - Tyrell Shavers 14 yard pass from Braxton Burmeister, Jack Browning kick
- (5:22) SDSU - Cam Davis 3 yard run, Jack Browning kick

Statistics	ISU	SDSU
First downs	14	19
Plays–yards	73-338	69-488
Rushes–yards	33-80	43-380
Passing yards	258	108
Passing: comp–att–int	24-40-0	15-26-0
Time of possession	30:40	29:20

Team	Category	Player	Statistics
Idaho State	Passing	Hunter Hays	18/30, 140 yards
Idaho State	Rushing	Raiden Hunter	13 carries, 53 yards
Idaho State	Receiving	Xavier Guillory	3 receptions, 94 yards, 1 TD
San Diego State	Passing	Braxton Burmeister	15/26, 108 yards, 1 TD
San Diego State	Rushing	Jaylon Armstead	5 carries, 96 yards
San Diego State	Receiving	Tyrell Shavers	3 receptions, 36 yards, 1 TD

=== At No. 14 Utah ===
Overall record	Previous meeting	Previous winner
13–12–1	September 18, 2021	San Diego State

San Diego State Aztecs (1–1) vs No. 14 Utah Utes (1–1) – Game summary

Quarter	1	2	3	4	Total
Aztecs	0	0	0	7	7
No . 14 Utes	0	21	14	0	35

at Rice-Eccles Stadium • Salt Lake City, UT

- Date: September 17, 2022
- Game time: 8:15 p.m.
- Game weather: Cloudy, 63 °F (17 °C)
- Game attendance: 51,602
- Referee: Mike Cuttone
- TV announcers (ESPN2): Mark Jones (play-by-play), Robert Griffin III (analyst), Quint Kessenich (sideline)

Game information

First Quarter

None

Second Quarter

- (8:59) UTAH – Brant Kuithe 30-yard pass from Cameron Rising, Jordon Noyes kick (Drive: 7 plays, 22 yards, 2:25; Utah 7–0)
- (2:07) UTAH – Solomon Enis 13-yard pass from Cameron Rising, Jordon Noyes kick (Drive: 9 plays, 82 yards, 4:34; Utah 14–0)
- (0:20) UTAH – Devaughn Vele 15-yard pass from Cameron Rising, Jordon Noyes kick (Drive: 4 plays, 27 yards, 1:47; Utah 21–0)

Third Quarter

- (11:31) UTAH – Tavion Thomas 18-yard run, Jordon Noyes kick (Drive: 4 plays, 30 yards, 1:51; Utah 28–0)
- (7:34) UTAH – Devaughn Vele 3-yard pass from Cameron Rising, Jordon Noyes kick (Drive: 4 plays, 55 yards, 1:52; Utah 35–0)

Fourth Quarter

- (3:56) SDSU – Josh Nicholson 18-yard pass from Kyle Crum, Jack Browning kick (Drive: 9 plays, 25 yards, 4:15; Utah 35–7)

Statistics	SDSU	UTAH
First downs	9	22
Total yards	173	398
Rushes/yards	34–113	38–174
Passing yards	60	224
Passing: Comp–Att–Int	7–21–1	18–30–0
Time of possession	28:38	31:22

Team	Category	Player	Statistics
San Diego State	Passing	Kyle Crum	5/16, 53 yards, TD, INT
San Diego State	Rushing	Jaylon Armstead	5 carries, 31 yards
San Diego State	Receiving	Josh Nicholson	2 receptions, 23 yards, TD
Utah	Passing	Cameron Rising	18/30, 224 yards, 4 TD
Utah	Rushing	Tavion Thomas	16 carries, 59 yards, TD
Utah	Receiving	Brant Kuithe	5 receptions, 64 yards, TD

=== Toledo ===
	1	2	3	4	Total
Rockets	0	0	0	14	14
Aztecs	0	7	3	7	17

=== Hawaii ===
Game Six – Hawaii Rainbow Warriors (1–4) at San Diego State Aztecs (2–3)

Quarter	1	2	3	4	Total
Rainbow Warriors	0	0	7	7	14
Aztecs	0	3	7	6	16

at Snapdragon Stadium, San Diego, CA

- Date: October 8, 2022
- Game time: 7:30 p.m. PST
- Game attendance: 33,073
- TV announcers (CBSSN): Rich Waltz (play-by-play), Aaron Taylor (analyst), Amanda Guerra (sideline)

=== At Fresno State ===
Game Eight – San Diego State Aztecs (4–3) at Fresno State Bulldogs (3–4)

Quarter	1	2	3	4	Total
Aztecs	7	14	7	0	28
Bulldogs	3	7	7	15	32

at Bulldog Stadium • Fresno, CA

- Date: Saturday, October 29, 2022
- Game time: 7:30 p.m. PST
- Game weather: Partly Cloudy • Temperature: 68 °F (20 °C) • Wind:
- Game attendance: 37,107
- Referee: Michael Vandervelde
- TV announcers (FS1): Jeff Levering (play-by-play), & Petros Papadakis (analyst)

Game information

First quarter

- (8:11) FRES – Abraham Montano 35-yard field goal (Drive: 13 plays, 68 yards, 6:49; Fresno State 3–0)
- (2:56) SDSU – Jalen Mayden 28-yard run, (Jack Browning kick) (Drive: 9 plays, 92 yards, 5:15; San Diego State 7–3)

Second quarter

- (12:19) SDSU – Kenan Christon 26-yard pass from Jalen Mayden, (Jack Browning kick) (Drive: 6 plays, 74 yards, 3:17; San Diego State 14–3)
- (8:35) FRES – Nikko Remigio 21-yard pass from Jake Haener, (Abraham Montano kick) (Drive: 9 plays, 75 yards, 3:44; San Diego State 14–10)
- (1:45) SDSU – Jalen Mayden 1-yard run, (Jack Browning kick) (Drive: 9 plays, 81 yards, 4:02; San Diego State 21–10)

Third quarter

- (1:45) SDSU – Jesse Matthews 7-yard pass from Jalen Mayden, (Jarrett Reeser kick) (Drive: 8 plays, 80 yards, 4:17; San Diego State 28–10)
- (0:00) FRES – Zane Pope 8-yard pass from Jake Haener, (Abraham Montano kick) (Drive: 2 plays, 10 yards, 0:35; San Diego State 28–17)

Fourth quarter

- (1:09) FRES – Jordan Mims 3-yard run, (Zane Pope–Jake Haener 2-point pass) (Drive: 11 plays, 80 yards, 2:46; San Diego State 28–25)
- (0:56) FRES – Nikko Remigio 37-yard pass from Jake Haener, (Abraham Montano kick) (Drive: 1 play, 37 yards, 0:09; Fresno State 32–28)

Statistics	SDSU	FRES
First downs	22	23
Plays–yards	63–449	72–391
Rushes–yards	38–158	26–-3
Passing yards	291	394
Passing: comp–att–int	19–25–2	34–45–2
Time of possession	29:05	30:55

Team	Category	Player	Statistics
San Diego State	Passing	Jalen Mayden	19/24, 291 yards, 2 TD, 2 INT
San Diego State	Rushing	Jalen Mayden	8 carries, 43 yards, 2 TD
San Diego State	Receiving	Kenan Christon	2 receptions, 75 yards, TD
Fresno State	Passing	Jake Haener	34/45, 394 yards, 3 TD, 2 INT
Fresno State	Rushing	Jordan Mims	13 carries, 32 yards, TD
Fresno State	Receiving	Zane Pope	10 receptions, 143 yards, TD

=== UNLV ===
At Snapdragon Stadium * San Diego, CA

- Date: Saturday, November 5, 2022
- Game Time: 4:00 p.m. PST
- Game Attendance: 28,854

Line score
Period	1	2	3	4	Total
Aztecs	0	7	7	0	14
Runnin' Rebels	0	0	7	3	10

=== Air Force ===
Air Force Falcons (8–3) at San Diego State Aztecs (7–4)

Quarter	1	2	3	4	Total
Falcons	7	0	3	3	13
Cowboys	0	0	3	0	3

at Snapdragon Stadium, San Diego, CA

- Date: November 26, 2022
- Game time: 6:00 p.m. PT
- Game weather: Sunny
- Game attendance: 25,223
- Referee: Steve Baron
- TV: CBSSN
- ESPN – SRoberts has 187 yards; Air Force beats San Diego St. 13-3

Game information

First quarter

- (12:27) AF TD – Brad Roberts 2-yard rush, Matthew Dapore kick
  Drive: 5 plays, 75 yards, 2:33; Air Force 7–0

Second quarter

- No Scoring

Third quarter

- (12:04) AF FG – Matthew Dapore 30-yard field goal
  Drive: 4 plays, 1 yards, 2:06; Air Force 10–0
- (09:12) SDSU FG – Jack Browning 26-yard field goal
  Drive: 6 plays, 31 yards, 2:44; Air Force 10–3

Fourth quarter

- (09:03) AF FG – Matthew Dapore 32-yard field goal
  Drive: 11 plays, 54 yards, 6:40; Air Force 13–3

Passing

- AF – Haaziq Daniels: 1/2, 14 yards
- SDSU – Jalen Mayden: 16/31, 188 yards, 2 INT

Rushing

- AF – Brad Roberts: 35 carries, 187 yards, 1 TD
- SDSU – Jordan Byrd: 6 carries, 13 yards

Receiving

- AF – David Cormier: 1 reception, 14 yards
- SDSU – Brionne Penny: 3 receptions, 63 yards

Defense

- AF – Jayden Goodwin: 7 total tackles (3 solo, 4 assisted), 1 pass break-up
- SDSU – Michael Shawcroft: 12 total tackles (9 solo, 3 assisted), 1 sack, 2 tackle for loss

Statistics	AF	SDSU
First downs	14	8
3rd down efficiency	4–17	0–10
4th down efficiency	1–2	1–1
Plays–yards	69–285	46–187
Rushes–yards	66–271	15– -1
Passing yards	14	188
Passing: Comp–Att–Int	1–3–0	16–31–1
Penalties–yards	4–30	8–49
Turnovers	0	3
Time of possession	39:13	20:47

=== Vs. Middle Tennessee (Hawaii Bowl) ===
	1	2	3	4	Total
Blue Raiders	0	13	3	9	25
Aztecs	14	0	3	6	23
