= Bobby Pate =

American football player and coach

Biographical details
- Born: November 29, 1936; Jacksonville, Florida, U.S.
- Died: September 28, 2024 (aged 87); LaGrange, Georgia, U.S.

Playing career
- 1957: South Georgia
- 1959: Presbyterian
- Position: Halfback

Coaching career (HC unless noted)
- 1965–1969: Toccoa HS (GA)
- 1971: Norcross HS (GA)
- 1972–1973: Cherokee HS (GA)
- 1974–1979: Western Carolina (assistant)
- 1981–1984: West Georgia
- 1985–1994: Hart County HS (GA)

Head coaching record
- Overall: 28–15 (college); 137–60–3 (high school)
- Tournaments: 3–1(NCAA D-III playoffs)

Accomplishments and honors

Championships
- 1 NCAA Division III (1982)

Bobby Carl Pate (November 29, 1936 – September 28, 2024) was an American football player and coach. He played college football at South Georgia State College under then-head coach Bobby Bowden before finishing his career at Presbyterian College in Clinton, South Carolina. He was selected by the San Francisco 49ers in the 1960 NFL draft, as well as by the Boston Patriots in the 1960 American Football League draft.

Pate began his coaching career at several Georgia high schools. He entered the college football ranks as an assistant coach at Western Carolina University from 1974 to 1979.

His first collegiate head coaching job came at the University of West Georgia, where he served from 1981 to 1984. He led West Georgia to the 1982 NCAA Division III National Championship.

Pate was married to Donna Dejarnette Howe from 1961 until her death on 24 May 2024. He died on 28 September 2024 at LaGrange Heritage Senior Living in LaGrange.

== Head coaching record ==
=== College ===
Year	Team	Overall	Conference	Standing	Bowl/playoffs
West Georgia Braves (NCAA Division III independent) (1981–1982)
1981	West Georgia	9–1			L NCAA Division III Quarterfinal
1982	West Georgia	12–0			W NCAA Division III Championship
West Georgia Braves (Gulf South Conference) (1983–1984)
1983	West Georgia	4–6	1–5	9th	
1984	West Georgia	3–8	1–7	9th	
West Georgia:		28–15	2–12		
Total:		28–15			
National championship Conference title Conference division title or championship game berth
