= 2008 Ball State Cardinals football team =

American college football season

2008 Ball State Cardinals football
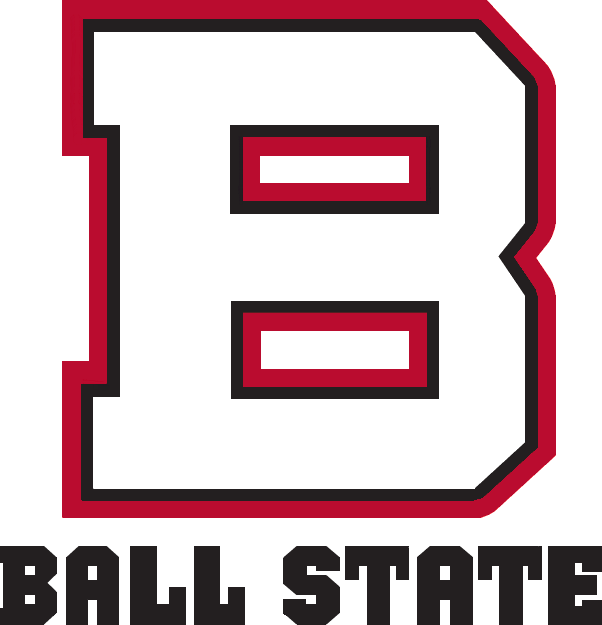

MAC West Division champion

MAC Championship Game, L 24–42 vs. Buffalo

GMAC Bowl, L 13–45 vs. Tulsa
- Conference: Mid-American Conference
- West
- Record: 12–2 (8–0 MAC West)
- Head coach: Brady Hoke (6th season; regular season); Stan Parrish (interim; bowl game)
- Offensive coordinator: Stan Parrish (2nd season)
- Defensive coordinator: Mark Smith (3rd season)
- Home stadium: Scheumann Stadium

2008 Mid-American Conference football standings
	Conf.			Overall
Team	W		L	W		L
East Division
Buffalo x$	5	–	3	8	–	6
Bowling Green	4	–	4	6	–	6
Temple	4	–	4	5	–	7
Ohio	3	–	5	4	–	8
Akron	3	–	5	5	–	7
Kent State	3	–	5	4	–	8
Miami (OH)	1	–	7	2	–	10
West Division
Ball State x	8	–	0	12	–	2
Central Michigan	6	–	2	8	–	5
Western Michigan	6	–	2	9	–	4
Northern Illinois	5	–	3	6	–	7
Toledo	2	–	6	3	–	9
Eastern Michigan	2	–	6	3	–	9
Championship: Buffalo 42, Ball State 24
$ – Conference champion; x – Division champion/co-champions

The 2008 Ball State Cardinals football team represented Ball State University in the Mid-American Conference during the 2008 NCAA Division I FBS football season. Brady Hoke, in his sixth season at Ball State, was the head coach until December 15, when he resigned to become the head coach at San Diego State. He was succeeded by offensive coordinator Stan Parrish, who coached the team during the GMAC Bowl and beyond. The Cardinals' home games were played at Scheumann Stadium in Muncie, Indiana.

With a 12–0 record during the regular season, the Cardinals completed their first perfect regular season since 1949 and their first undefeated season in Mid-American Conference play since 1978. The Cardinals earned their first Mid-American Conference West Championship in program history. The Cardinals chance at perfection ended after an upset loss to Buffalo in the 2008 MAC Championship Game. Ball State concluded the season with a 45–13 loss to Tulsa in the 2009 GMAC Bowl. The game marked the first time in school history Ball State has played in a bowl game in back-to-back seasons.

== Preseason ==
=== Outlook ===
The Cardinals ended the 2007 season with a 7–6 overall record, the Mid-American Conference West Division Co-Championship and the program's first bowl game in 11 seasons, losing to Rutgers 52–30 in the 2008 International Bowl. Ball State ranked in the top 35 nationally in 2007 in five different categories; turnover margin (4th), passing offense (22nd), passing efficiency (24th), net punting (29th) and total offense (31st). The quarterback of the Ball State offense was Nate Davis who threw for 30 touchdowns to just six interceptions in his 478 pass attempts. The Cardinals returned their starting receiving corps, which helped lead Ball State to be the #1 ranked passing offense in the Mid-American Conference. Wide receiver Dante Love produced nearly 1,400 receiving yards while adding 203 more rushing with eleven touchdowns in 2007. Love also led the Mid-American Conference in three categories; receptions per game (7.7), receiving yards per game (107.5) and all-purpose yards (207). Punter Chris Miller was third in the country in 2007 averaging 45.4 yards per punt last season and was considered to be an All-American candidate. The Cardinals also returned tight end Darius Hill. Considered to be the premier tight end in the Mid-American Conference, Hill averaged 71 yards per game and scored 11 touchdowns last season. Regarding the offensive line, Andre Ramsey, Dan Gerberry and Robert Brewster were each three-year starters that form a solid nucleus along the offensive line. Defensively, the Cardinals ranked just 106th in the nation in rush defense, and allowed 432 yards and 28.3 points per game. The Cardinals did, however, returned eight defensive starters, including six letterman. Returning for the 2008 season were cornerbacks B.J. Hill and Trey Lewis, who both recorded five interceptions in 2007. Defensive end Brandon Crawford had eight sacks in the previous season and linebacker Bryant Haines recorded 125 tackles.

At the Mid-American Conference Football Media Preview in Detroit, the Ball State Cardinals were picked to finish second in the Mid-American Conference West Division behind Central Michigan. Central Michigan grabbed 29 of the 36 first-place votes with Ball State receiving five first-place votes and Western Michigan receiving two. Central Michigan totaled 207 points in the preseason poll, while the Cardinals tallied 168.

=== Recruiting ===
College recruiting
Name	Hometown	School	Height	Weight	40^{‡}	Commit date
Jeff Barker; DE	Lowell, IN	Lowell HS	6 ft 6 in (1.98 m)	215 lb (98 kg)	–	Dec 28, 2007
Jeff Barker; DE	Recruit ratings: Scout: Rivals: (40)					
James Cravens; RB	Centerville, OH	Centerville HS	6 ft 0 in (1.83 m)	213 lb (97 kg)	4.50	Dec 11, 2007
James Cravens; RB	Recruit ratings: Scout: Rivals: (72)					
Andre Dawson; WR	Lewis Center, OH	Olentangy HS	6 ft 1 in (1.85 m)	172 lb (78 kg)	4.55	Jan 29, 2008
Andre Dawson; WR	Recruit ratings: Scout: Rivals: (40)					
Torieal Gibson; WR	Cleveland, OH	Glenville HS	5 ft 9 in (1.75 m)	163 lb (74 kg)	4.56	Jan 29, 2008
Torieal Gibson; WR	Recruit ratings: Scout: Rivals: (40)					
Jeremy Hill; WR	Marietta, GA	Marietta HS	6 ft 2 in (1.88 m)	177 lb (80 kg)	–	Jan 29, 2008
Jeremy Hill; WR	Recruit ratings: Scout: Rivals: (40)					
Kyle Hoke; LB	Sugar Land, TX	Clements HS	6 ft 0 in (1.83 m)	195 lb (88 kg)	4.65	Jan 14, 2008
Kyle Hoke; LB	Recruit ratings: Scout: Rivals: (69)					
Austin Holtz; OL	Holt, MI	Holt HS	6 ft 6 in (1.98 m)	278 lb (126 kg)	5.20	Oct 6, 2007
Austin Holtz; OL	Recruit ratings: Scout: Rivals: (69)					
Joshua Howard; DB	Inkster, MI	Inkster HS	6 ft 1 in (1.85 m)	190 lb (86 kg)	4.50	Dec 1, 2007
Joshua Howard; DB	Recruit ratings: Scout: Rivals: (40)					
Scott Kovanda; P	Detroit, MI	Catholic Central HS	6 ft 2 in (1.88 m)	195 lb (88 kg)	–	Dec 28, 2007
Scott Kovanda; P	Recruit ratings: Scout: Rivals: (40)					
Cameron Lowry; OL	Indianapolis, IN	Pike Central HS	6 ft 6 in (1.98 m)	249 lb (113 kg)	5.00	Dec 17, 2007
Cameron Lowry; OL	Recruit ratings: Scout: Rivals: (40)					
Dan Manick; DT	Dyer, IN	Lake Central HS	6 ft 4 in (1.93 m)	265 lb (120 kg)	4.80	Oct 14, 2007
Dan Manick; DT	Recruit ratings: Scout: Rivals: (40)					
Robert Martin; LB	Indianapolis, IN	Pike Central HS	6 ft 2 in (1.88 m)	230 lb (100 kg)	4.60	Feb 4, 2008
Robert Martin; LB	Recruit ratings: Scout: Rivals: (40)					
Adam Morris; DT	Dublin, OH	Scioto HS	6 ft 0 in (1.83 m)	290 lb (130 kg)	–	Aug 23, 2007
Adam Morris; DT	Recruit ratings: Scout: Rivals: (40)					
Briggs Orsbon; WR	Convoy, OH	Crestview HS	6 ft 0 in (1.83 m)	179 lb (81 kg)	4.40	Nov 23, 2007
Briggs Orsbon; WR	Recruit ratings: Scout: Rivals: (69)					
Kelly Page; QB	Mesquite, TX	Mesquite HS	6 ft 3 in (1.91 m)	210 lb (95 kg)	4.62	Jan 29, 2008
Kelly Page; QB	Recruit ratings: Scout: Rivals: (80)					
Blaine Schafer; OL	Plymouth, IN	Plymouth HS	6 ft 6 in (1.98 m)	292 lb (132 kg)	5.15	Feb 4, 2008
Blaine Schafer; OL	Recruit ratings: Scout: Rivals: (40)					
Steve Schott; K	Massillon, OH	Massillon Washington HS	6 ft 1 in (1.85 m)	155 lb (70 kg)	4.74	Dec 13, 2007
Steve Schott; K	Recruit ratings: Scout: Rivals: (40)					
Joshua Smith; DB	Cincinnati, OH	Withrow HS	6 ft 2 in (1.88 m)	185 lb (84 kg)	4.50	Jan 14, 2008
Joshua Smith; DB	Recruit ratings: Scout: Rivals: (66)					
Cory Sykes; RB	Harvey, IL	Thornton Township HS	5 ft 7 in (1.70 m)	155 lb (70 kg)	–	Feb 6, 2008
Cory Sykes; RB	Recruit ratings: Scout: Rivals: (40)					
Rashaad White; RB	Stockbridge, GA	Stockbridge HS	5 ft 9 in (1.75 m)	207 lb (94 kg)	4.47	Jan 14, 2008
Rashaad White; RB	Recruit ratings: Scout: Rivals: (40)					
Steve Yoder; DE	Massillon, OH	Massillon Washington HS	6 ft 4 in (1.93 m)	278 lb (126 kg)	–	Jan 29, 2008
Steve Yoder; DE	Recruit ratings: Scout: Rivals: (64)					
Overall recruit ranking: Scout: #102 Rivals: #101
‡ Refers to 40-yard dash; Note: In many cases, Scout, Rivals, 247Sports, On3, and ESPN may conflict in their listings of height, weight and 40 time.; In these cases, the average was taken. ESPN grades are on a 100-point scale.; Sources: "Ball State Commit List for 2008". Rivals.; "Scout.com Football Recruiting: Ball State". Scout.; "RecruitTracker 2008: Ball State". ESPN.; "Scout.com Team Recruiting Rankings". Scout.; "2008 Team Ranking". Rivals.com.

=== Coaching staff ===
Coaches	Position
Brady Hoke	Head coach; resigned on December 15 to become head coach at San Diego State.
Stan Parrish	Offensive coordinator/quarterbacks coach; succeeded Hoke as head coach.
Mark Smith	Defensive coordinator/linebackers coach
Phil Burnett	Defensive line coach
Eddie Faulkner	Running backs coach
Sidney Powell	Secondary coach
Darrell Funk	Offensive guards & centers coach
Jeff Hecklinski	Wide receivers coach & recruiting coordinator
John Powers	Offensive tackles & tight ends coach
Ed Stults	Assistant head coach/special teams coordinator
Ryan Aiello	Graduate assistant coach
Brad Wilson	Graduate assistant coach
Bill Zenisek	Graduate assistant coach
Jay Steilberg	Director of football operations
Aaron Wellman	Director of strength and conditioning/football
D.J. Welte	Video and technology coordinator

== Schedule ==
Date	Time	Opponent	Rank	Site	TV	Result	Attendance
August 28	7:00 p.m.	Northeastern*		Scheumann Stadium; Muncie, IN		W 48–14	13,068
September 5	7:00 p.m.	Navy*		Scheumann Stadium; Muncie, IN	ESPN	W 35–23	22,517
September 13	1:00 p.m.	at Akron		Rubber Bowl; Akron, OH		W 41–24	9,013
September 20	7:00 p.m.	at Indiana*		Memorial Stadium; Bloomington, IN	BTN	W 42–20	41,349
September 27	12:00 p.m.	Kent State^{†}		Scheumann Stadium; Muncie, IN	ESPN+	W 41–20	20,437
October 4	7:00 p.m.	at Toledo		Glass Bowl; Toledo, OH		W 31–0	18,009
October 11	6:00 p.m.	at Western Kentucky*	No. 25	Houchens Industries–L. T. Smith Stadium; Bowling Green, KY		W 24–7	16,319
October 25	12:00 p.m.	Eastern Michigan	No. 20	Scheumann Stadium; Muncie, IN		W 38–16	20,948
November 5	8:00 p.m.	Northern Illinois	No. 16	Scheumann Stadium; Muncie, IN (Battle for the Bronze Stalk)	ESPN2	W 45–14	14,373
November 11	7:00 p.m.	at Miami (OH)	No. 14	Yager Stadium; Oxford, OH	ESPN2	W 31–16	14,758
November 19	7:00 p.m.	at Central Michigan	No. 14	Kelly/Shorts Stadium; Mount Pleasant, MI	ESPN2	W 31–24	20,114
November 25	7:00 p.m.	Western Michigan	No. 15	Scheumann Stadium; Muncie, IN	ESPN2	W 45–22	23,861
December 5	8:00 p.m.	vs. Buffalo	No. 12	Ford Field; Detroit, MI (MAC Championship)	ESPN2	L 24–42	12,871
January 6	8:00 p.m.	vs. Tulsa*	No. 23	Ladd–Peebles Stadium; Mobile, AL (GMAC Bowl)	ESPN	L 13–45	32,816
*Non-conference game; ^{†}Homecoming; Rankings from AP Poll released prior to the game; All times are in Eastern time

== Game summaries ==
=== Northeastern ===
	1	2	3	4	Total
Huskies	0	7	0	7	14
Cardinals	7	24	7	10	48

Nate Davis passed for 280 yards and three touchdowns as Ball State beat Northeastern 48–14 in the season opener for both teams. MiQuale Lewis had 11 carries for 95 yards and one touchdown as the Cardinals garnered 190 yards rushing. Ball State had 487 yards total offense. Davis’ two other touchdown passes were a 49-yard completion to Dante Love and an eight-yard pass to Darius Hill in the first half. He completed 21 of 24 passes with no interceptions. The Huskies were down 28–0 with 50 seconds left in the first half when Greg Abelli scored on a 20-yard run. The Cardinals quickly responded with a 25-yard field goal by Ian McGarvey to make it 31–7 at halftime. Ball State lengthened its lead after the break to 48–7 with a 27-yard pass from Davis to Daniel Ifft, a Cory Sykes six-yard run and another McGarvey field goal. Northeastern backup quarterback John Sperrazza, who completed six of seven passes for 82 yards, threw a pass to Conor Gilmartin-Donohue for a 10-yard touchdown with 38 seconds left in the game. Starter Anthony Orio completed 14 of 30 passes for 149 yards.

=== Navy ===
	1	2	3	4	Total
Midshipmen	6	10	7	0	23
Cardinals	14	7	7	7	35

Nate Davis passed for 326 yards and four touchdowns, but it was the Cardinals’ defense that repeatedly came up with the big plays in the second half of a 35–23 victory over the Midshipmen. Davis passed for 215 yards in the first half, including touchdowns of 61 yards to Dante Love on the second play of the game and 30 yards to Briggs Orsbon late in the second quarter. Love, who tied a school record with his eleventh game of at least 100 yards receiving, also rushed for a touchdown and caught a go-ahead 8 yard touchdown pass from Davis midway through the third quarter. After Love's second touchdown catch put Ball State ahead 28–23, Navy threatened to take the lead again late in the third period. Shun White, who set a Navy rushing record with 348 yards and three touchdowns in the previous week, was stopped at the 3 yard line, and quarterback Jarod Bryant, who ran for Navy's first two touchdowns, was held for no gain on fourth down, giving the ball back to the Cardinals. Ball State then put the game out of reach with a 97-yard drive, scoring the clinching touchdown on a 35-yard pass from Davis to Darius Hill early in the final period. The game was nationally televised on ESPN and earned a 1.2 Nielsen rating, making it the best regular season national television rating for a Mid-American Conference home game since 2005.

=== Akron ===
	1	2	3	4	Total
Cardinals	7	10	14	10	41
Zips	3	7	0	14	24

MiQuale Lewis rushed for 154 yards and two touchdowns and Nate Davis passed for 300 yards and two more touchdowns to lead Ball State past Akron 41–24. Lewis carried 28 times and scored on runs of three and two yards. Davis completed 24 of 36 passes with one interception, throwing touchdown passes of 21 yards to Briggs Orsbon and 25 yards to Darius Hill. Chris Jacquemain completed 21 of 44 passes for 269 yards and a 13-yard touchdown pass to Andre Jones, but was also intercepted off four times, three of them by Sean Baker. With the score tied at 10 early in the second quarter, the Cardinals scored 21 points on Lewis’ two touchdown and Baker's 33 yard return of a fumble. The victory marked the first time Ball State started the season 3–0 since 1988.

=== Indiana ===
	1	2	3	4	Total
Cardinals	14	14	0	14	42
Hoosiers	6	14	0	0	20

MiQuale Lewis ran for 166 yards and four touchdowns, helping Ball State to a 42–20 victory over Indiana. It was the first time the Cardinals beat a BCS conference school. The victory also ended Indiana's 20 game winning streak against Mid-American Conference opponents, which dated to a September 24, 1977, loss against Miami (Ohio) when Lee Corso was coaching the Hoosiers. The Cardinals gained 463 yards in offense, scored 28 points in the first half and put the game away with two touchdown runs from Lewis in the fourth quarter. Indiana was led by Kellen Lewis, who ran for 148 yards and one touchdown and threw for 159 yards but was intercepted twice. Nate Davis was 16 of 25 for 239 yards and threw one touchdown pass. Both teams combining for nearly 500 total yards and two defensive touchdowns in the first half.

==== Dante Love injury ====
With 10:45 left in the first half, Dante Love, who entered the game leading the nation at 144.3 yards per game, caught a short pass and started to turn upfield when Indiana cornerback Chris Adkins jarred the ball loose with a big hit that led to an Indiana touchdown. Love stayed on the ground for several minutes before doctors rolled him onto a backboard and carted him off the field. School officials later issued a statement saying Love felt numbness and tingling while on the field. He was taken to Bloomington Hospital before being transferred to Methodist Hospital in Indianapolis for further evaluation. Love underwent a five-hour surgery for a cervical spine fracture and a spinal cord injury and had movement in his arms and legs after the procedure. On September 22, head coach Brady Hoke told reporters, "Due to the injury Dante sustained, his football career is expected to be over. He should have normal and healthy functions for the rest of his life. He touched a lot of lives, and he will continue to do so."

=== Kent State ===
	1	2	3	4	Total
Golden Flashes	0	7	7	6	20
Cardinals	7	14	13	7	41

Before the game, Ball State players wore red T-shirts with Love's jersey number 86 on the front during warmups, and had stickers with the number on the back of their helmets. A “We Love Dante” sign was draped over the fence just past the north end zone and Love also was named an honorary captain. MiQuale Lewis opened the scoring with a two-yard touchdown run in the first quarter. Early in the second quarter, Nate Davis threw a pass to Myles Trempe for a 31-yard touchdown that gave the Cardinals a 14–0 lead. Kent State responded late in the quarter when quarterback Julian Edelman scored on a 12-yard run to cut Ball State's lead to 14–7. Lewis scored his second touchdown on a one-yard run with 21 seconds left in the second quarter to give the Cardinals a 21–7 lead at halftime. Cory Sykes’ 10 yard touchdown run in the opening minutes of the third quarter made it 28–7, and the Cardinals led by at least 17 points the rest of the way. Lewis ran for 116 yards and three touchdowns and Davis passed for 265 yards and a touchdown.

=== Toledo ===
	1	2	3	4	Total
Cardinals	3	0	14	14	31
Rockets	0	0	0	0	0

MiQuale Lewis rushed for 157 yards and two touchdowns and Ball State broke away from a close game at halftime to beat Toledo 31–0. Lewis carried the ball 31 times and scored on runs of three and one yards for the Cardinals. After taking the second half kickoff, Nate Davis led a 10 play, 74 yard drive that he capped with a one-yard touchdown run. Lewis then scored late in the quarter before the Cardinals added two more touchdowns in a two and a half minute span midway through the fourth quarter. Toledo lost its third straight home game for the first time in 15 years and was shut out by a Mid-American Conference opponent for the first time since 1985. The Rockets managed just 157 yards of total offense, rushing for 14 yards on 19 attempts. Davis completed 18 of 30 passes for 242 yards and Sykes added 90 yards on seven carries. After the victory, The Cardinals received enough votes to move into the Associated Press poll for the first time in school history, ranking at #25. It is also the first time the Cardinals started the season 6–0 since 1965.

=== Western Kentucky ===
	1	2	3	4	Total
Cardinals	0	7	7	10	24
Hilltoppers	0	0	0	7	7

Nate Davis threw for 155 yards and two touchdowns as Ball State overcame a slow start in its first ever game as a ranked team to beat Western Kentucky 24–7. Ball State led just 7–0 at halftime before eventually taking control in the third quarter. The Cardinals drove 64 yards during the opening drive of the second half, though it ended with Ian McGarvey missing a 21-yard field goal attempt. Afterwards, the Cardinals' defense forced Western Kentucky into a quick three and out. In the Cardinals' next offensive possession, Lewis ran up the middle of the field for 38 yards to set up a one-yard touchdown run that put the Cardinals up 14–0. McGarvey successfully kicked a 37-yard field goal to push the lead to 17–0, and after Western Kentucky failed on fourth down deep in its own territory, Davis completed a pass to Louis Johnson for a 20-yard touchdown with 6:31 remaining to put the game out of reach. The Hilltoppers garnered 352 yards of offense but turned the ball over three times and fell to 0–5 against Football Bowl Subdivision teams in the season. The Cardinals moved up one spot to #24 in the Associated Press poll and entered the USA Today coaches poll at #25, The Cardinals were the first Mid-American Conference team to appear in the coaches poll since Bowling Green in 2004. During their bye week, the Ball State Cardinals moved from #24 to #20 in the Associated Press poll and from #25 to #22 in the USA Today coaches poll. Ball State also debuted at #20 in the first BCS poll of the season.

=== Eastern Michigan ===
	1	2	3	4	Total
Eagles	0	0	7	9	16
Cardinals	3	7	14	14	38

Nate Davis gave the Cardinals their first touchdown in the second quarter when he pitched the ball to Briggs Orsbon and sprinted toward the sideline, where Orsbon found him open for an easy four-yard catch into the end zone. In the third quarter, Davis completed a five-yard touchdown pass to Darius Hill and a six-yard touchdown pass to Orsbon. On the final play of the third quarter, Eastern Michigan's Andy Schmitt completed a seven-yard pass to Jacory Stone to give the Eagles their first points of the game. MiQuale Lewis, who came in with a streak of six straight games rushing for at least 100 yards, was held to 75 yards, but scored a 52-yard touchdown two plays into the fourth quarter. Trey Buice finished the rout for the Cardinals with a 45-yard interception return for a touchdown midway through the final quarter, and Ian McGarvey's extra-point kick extended his school record to 48 in a row. Davis passed for 241 yards and Schmitt finished with a career-high 309 yards passing. Ball State's defense held the Eagles to 67 yards rushing and had two interceptions. With the victory, Ball State moved up two spots in the Associated Press poll to #18, up three spots to #19 in the USA Today coaches poll, and up four spots to #16 in the BCS poll. During their second bye week, the Cardinals' moved up two spots to #16 in the Associated Press poll and one spot to #18 in the USA Today coaches poll. However, the Cardinals moved down one spot to #17 in the BCS poll.

=== Northern Illinois ===
	1	2	3	4	Total
Huskies	0	0	7	7	14
Cardinals	7	14	17	7	45

After forcing an early punt, defensive back Kiaree Daniels ran into Ball State's Chris Miller, drawing a 15-yard penalty to give a first down to the Cardinals'. Nate Davis responded by throwing a 33-yard pass to Briggs Orsbon at the Huskies' one-yard line. Two plays later, Miquale Lewis scored for a 7–0 lead. Midway through the second quarter, Davis completed a 33-yard pass to Louis Johnson. Then Davis threw his second touchdown pass to Darius Hill for a 14–0 lead. With 1:53 to go in the second quarter, Davis threw his third touchdown pass to Daniel Ifft for a 21–0 lead. Northern Illinois' Chandler Harnish opened the second half with a 25-yard touchdown run, but Lewis' 64 yard run on the ensuing drive set up a Davis one-yard touchdown run. Then, after a replay review reversed a 71-yard touchdown pass from Davis to Johnson, Davis went right back to Johnson for a 22-yard touchdown. Davis finished his night with a 20-yard touchdown pass to Hill early in the fourth quarter that made it 45–7. Davis completed 18 passes out of 22 for 300 yards and broke Mike Neu's career record for completions. Lewis ran 19 times and reached the 1,000 yard mark for the season, while Johnson caught six passes for 165 yards and a touchdown. Northern Illinois allowed nearly six times its per game average of 8.2 points. The Cardinals moved up two spots to #14 in the Associated Press poll, two spots in the USA Today coaches poll to #16, and three spots to #14 in the BCS poll after the victory over the Huskies.

=== Miami (OH) ===
	1	2	3	4	Total
Cardinals	0	17	7	7	31
RedHawks	0	13	3	0	16

Nate Davis threw for a touchdown and ran for another, and the Cardinals stayed unbeaten by wearing down the Miami RedHawks for a 31–16 victory. Ball State improved to 10–0 for the first time and matched their school record for victories. MiQuale Lewis had two one-yard touchdowns in the second half and finished with 165 yards, one short of his career high. He also caught two passes for 51 yards. For the third straight game, the Cardinals did not draw a penalty. Despite the victory, The Cardinals dropped three spots to #17 in the BCS Poll, but stayed in the same spot in the Associated Press and USA Today coaches poll.

=== Central Michigan ===
	1	2	3	4	Total
Cardinals	7	3	7	14	31
Chippewas	0	10	7	7	24

The win clinched a share of the Mid-American Conference West Division title for Ball State and set a school record for wins in a season. The win broke a streak of four consecutive losses to Central Michigan, which had won the past two division titles. The Cardinals went ahead with 7:29 left when Davis completed a pass to Briggs Orsbon in the corner of the end zone from 11 yards away. Central Michigan had a chance to tie it in the closing seconds, but Central Michigan quarterback Dan LeFevour was intercepted by Sean Baker with 27 seconds left. Davis completed 12 of 22 passes for 175 yards, including two touchdown passes to Louis Robinson. LeFevour completed 30 of 44 passes for 345 yards and two touchdowns, and added a team high 75 yards rushing on 24 carries. He became the fifth quarterback in Mid-American Conference history to pass 11,000 career yards in total offense. The game aired on ESPN2 and ranked as the most viewed and highest rated college football game ever for a Tuesday or Wednesday night on the network with a 1.6 Nielsen Rating. It also ranks as the Mid-American Conference's most viewed regular season college football game ever on ESPN or ESPN2. The Cardinals moved up two spots from #17 to #15 in the BCS poll, up one to #15 in the USA Today coaches poll and dropped a spot to #15 in the Associated Press poll.

=== Western Michigan ===
	1	2	3	4	Total
Broncos	7	7	0	8	22
Cardinals	14	10	14	7	45

MiQuale Lewis started the scoring in the game as he ran for a 10-yard touchdown run. On Ball State's next series, Davis completed a 40-yard touchdown pass to Lewis Johnson, whose "stop-and-go" move enabled him to elude two defenders. Western Michigan responded with a trick play, scoring when Tim Hiller threw a lateral to backup quarterback Drew Burdi, who turned and threw a 36-yard touchdown pass to Scneider Julien, making it 14–7. The Broncos tied it early in the second quarter on a pass from Hiller to Juan Nunez, who caught the nine-yard pass over his shoulder. The Cardinals broke the tie on a 43-yard field goal from Ian McGarvey and took a 24–14 halftime lead when Davis ran for a six-yard touchdown run. Lewis' one-yard touchdown run late in the third quarter and Trey Lewis' interception return made it 38–14. Western Michigan closed to 38–22 early in the fourth when Brandon West scored on an eight-yard touchdown run. But Lewis closed it out with a one-yard touchdown run with 4:31 to go, his twentieth rushing score of the season, which broke the previous record set by Mark Bornholdt in 1979. The Cardinals completed their first perfect regular season since 1949, their first undefeated season in Mid-American Conference play since 1978 and clinched a spot in the conference title game. The win gave Ball State its first Mid-American Conference West title in program history. A school record 11,088 students and 23,861 overall attended the game. The Cardinals moved up to #12 in the BCS and Associated Press poll and up to #13 in the USA Today coaches poll.

=== MAC Championship Game: Buffalo ===
	1	2	3	4	Total
Cardinals	0	10	7	7	24
Bulls	7	0	21	14	42

The Cardinals fell into an early deficit when Buffalo quarterback Drew Willy completed a pass to Naam Roosevelt for a two-yard touchdown. The Cardinals responded midway through the second quarter as MiQuale Lewis ran for a four-yard touchdown. As the first half expired, Ian McGarvey kicked a 47-yard field goal to give the Cardinals a 10–7 lead. In the third quarter, Willy completed a 39-yard pass to Roosevelt to give the Bulls the lead 14–10. The Cardinals responded on the next drive, as Lewis concluded a seven-play, 65 yard drive with his second touchdown of the game, this time on a one-yard run to give the Cardinals the lead. After recovering a fumble, the Cardinals offense made it all the way to the Buffalo one-yard line, but a two-yard loss and a false start penalty pushed the ball back to the eight-yard line. On the next play, Nate Davis attempted to dive into the end zone, but fumbled the ball and was recovered by Buffalo's Mike Newton, who ran the ball back 92 yards for a touchdown. After getting to the Buffalo 15 yard line, the Cardinals fumbled for the third time and was run back for a 74-yard touchdown by Buffalo's Sherrod Lott for a 28–17 lead. The Cardinals fourth fumble of the game, which was forced and recovered by Buffalo's Adekunle Akingba, set up Willy's third touchdown pass to Roosevelt on an eight-yard completion to increase the lead to 35–17. The Cardinals cut the Buffalo lead back to 11 points with 4:17 remaining in the game after a 22-yard completion from Davis to Louis Johnson. Needing to get the ball back quickly, the Cardinals attempted an onside kick after the score, which was recovered by the Bulls. Buffalo then extended its lead to 18 points for a second time at 42–24, on a one-yard touchdown run by James Starks. An interception in the end zone with 41 seconds remaining in the game sealed the win for Buffalo. The game received a 1.7 Nielsen Rating, which set a Mid-American Conference record for the most viewers to ever watch a game involving two MAC teams on the ESPN family of networks. The Cardinals' fell to #23 in the Associated Press poll and to #22 in the USA Today and BCS poll.

=== GMAC Bowl ===
	1	2	3	4	Total
Cardinals	7	6	0	0	13
Golden Hurricane	10	14	7	14	45

Tulsa took the early 7–0 lead over the Cardinals in the first quarter but Ball State answered back with an 18-yard touchdown run from Nate Davis. The Cardinals defense held Tulsa to a 30-yard field goal late in the first quarter but the Golden Hurricane went on to score with 10:39 remaining in the second quarter increasing their lead to 17–7. Robert Eddins blocked the first punt of his career and Jeremy Hill recovered the ball to give Ball State favorable field position, which resulted in a 40-yard field goal from Ian McGarvey with 6:36 left in the second quarter and closed Tulsa's lead to 17–10. Tulsa made its way down the field quickly to go ahead of the Cardinals 24–10 with 4:30 left in the second quarter on a 57-yard touchdown run. With 29 seconds before the completion of the first half, McGarvey made a 22-yard field goal to close the gap to 24–13 at the break. During halftime, inclement weather conditions occurred with a heavy downpour which continued for the majority of the remainder of the game. But the weather did not hamper the Golden Hurricane who opened the second half with a touchdown to take a 31–13 edge over Ball State. Tulsa added another touchdown after Tarrion Adams scored his third touchdown of the game making it 38–13 with 13:29 remaining in the fourth quarter. The last touchdown scored was with 10:25 in the fourth when Tulsa completed a 13-yard pass to Jacob Frank making the score 45–13. The game marked the first time in school history Ball State has played in a bowl game in back-to-back season. With the loss, Ball State dropped out of the Associated Press and USA Today coaches poll.

== Honors ==
=== Watchlists ===
Players	Awards
Robert Brewster	Outland Trophy and Lombardi Award
Nate Davis	Maxwell Award and Walter Camp Award
Dan Gerberry	Rimington Trophy
Bryant Haines	Butkus Award
Darius Hill	John Mackey Award and Lombardi Award
Chris Miller	Ray Guy Award

=== Player of the week ===
Players	Awards
Sean Baker	Walter Camp Foundation National Defensive Player of the Week and Mid-American Conference West Division Defensive Player of the Week (Akron)
Nate Davis	Mid-American Conference West Division Offensive Player of the Week (Eastern Michigan & Northern Illinois)
Derrick Henry	Mid-American Conference West Division Defensive Player of the Week (Indiana)
B.J. Hill	Mid-American Conference West Division Special Teams Player of the Week (Northeastern)
Davyd Jones	Mid-American Conference West Division Defensive Player of the Week (Miami)
MiQuale Lewis	Mid-American Conference Offensive Player of the Week (Indiana & Central Michigan)
Trey Lewis	Mid-American Conference West Division Defensive Player of the Week (Western Michigan)
Ian McGarvey	Mid-American Conference West Division Special Teams Players of the Week (Central Michigan)

== Rankings ==
Ranking movements Legend: ██ Increase in ranking ██ Decrease in ranking — = Not ranked RV = Received votes
	Week																
Poll	Pre	1	2	3	4	5	6	7	8	9	10	11	12	13	14	15	Final
AP	—	—	—	RV	RV	RV	25	24	20	18	16	14	14	15	12	23	RV
Coaches Poll	—	—	—	RV	RV	RV	RV	25	22	19	18	16	16	15	13	22	RV
Harris	Not released					RV	RV	23	20	17	17	15	15	14	11	20	Not released
BCS	Not released								20	16	17	14	17	15	12	22	Not released

== Statistics ==
=== Team ===
	Team	Opp
Scoring	489	287
Points per Game	34.9	20.5
First downs	325	280
Rushing yards	2583	2282
Passing yards	3612	2873
Total Offense	6195	5155
Avg per Play	6.7	5.4
Avg per Game	442.5	368.2
Fumbles-Lost	15–10	15–7
Penalties-Yards	39–374	68–600

	Team	Opp
Avg per Punt	42.5	38.6
Time of Possession/Game	30:45	29:15
3rd Down Conversions	76/161	81/194
4th Down Conversions	7/12	12/28

==== Scores by quarter ====
	1	2	3	4	Total
Ball State	90	143	128	128	489
Opponents	39	89	66	93	287

=== Offense ===
==== Rushing ====
Name	Att	Yds	Avg	TD	Long	Avg/G
MiQuale Lewis	322	1736	5.4	22	64	124.0
Cory Sykes	78	428	5.5	3	57	32.9
Nate Davis	66	312	4.7	5	34	22.3
Dante Love	14	64	4.6	2	11	16.0
Ray Winkler	10	37	3.7	0	11	9.2
Frank Edmonds	9	27	3.0	0	7	9.0
Briggs Orsbon	3	9	3.0	0	12	0.6
Rashaad White	3	8	2.7	0	6	8.0
Tanner Justice	1	−2	−2.0	0	0	−1.0

==== Passing ====
Name	Effic	Comp-Att-Int	Yds	Pct	TD	Long	Avg/G
Nate Davis	156.97	258–401–8	3591	64.3%	26	61 yds	256.5
Tanner Justice	171.40	2–2–0	17	100%	0	10 yds	1.5
Briggs Orsbon	463.60	1–1–0	4	100%	1	4 yds	0.3
Perci Garner	0.00	0–1–0	0	0%	0	0 yds	0.0

==== Receiving ====
Name	Rec	Yds	Avg	TD	Long	Avg/G
Briggs Orsbon	68	813	12.0	5	36	58.1
Darius Hill	40	670	16.8	7	38	47.9
Louis Johnson	26	516	19.8	6	45	57.3
Dante Love	28	460	16.4	3	61	115.0
MiQuale Lewis	35	325	9.3	0	46	23.2
Madaris Grant	26	285	11.0	0	29	23.8
Daniel Ifft	15	259	17.3	3	34	23.5
Myles Trempe	14	231	16.5	2	45	38.5
Chris Clancy	3	23	7.7	0	10	7.7
Torieal Gibson	4	19	4.8	0	11	4.8
Frank Edmonds	1	7	7.0	0	7	2.3
Nate Davis	1	4	4.0	1	4	0.3

=== Defense ===
Name	Tackles		Sacks	Pass defense		Interceptions	Fumbles		Blkd Kick
Name	Total	TFL-Yds	No-Yds	Def	QBH	No.-Yds	Rcv-Yds	FF	Blkd Kick
Alex Knipp	96	3.5–12	1.0–4	6	1	2–0	0–0	0	0
Sean Baker	94	4.0–11	0–0	10	1	6–46	1–33	2	0
Bryant Haines	86	7.5–32	4.0–28	2	0	0–0	2–0	0	0
Davyd Jones	85	12.0–33	2.0–12	1	1	0–0	0–0	0	0
B.J. Hill	77	5.0–13	0–0	5	1	3–13	0–0	1	0
Trey Buice	64	3.0–14	1.0–11	6	0	2–45	0–0	0	0
Trey Lewis	60	8.0–30	1.0–10	4	1	3–35	0–0	0	0
Sam Woodworth	53	3.5–9	1.0–4	2	1	0–0	0–0	0	0
Kenny Meeks	48	9.0–60	6.0–43	1	3	0–0	0–0	1	0
Robert Eddins	45	6.5–39	4.0–32	3	2	0–0	0–0	1	1
Derrick Henry	42	1.0–2	0–0	1	0	0–0	0–0	2	0
Lorren Womack	41	0.5–1	0–0	0	0	0–0	0–0	0	0
Brandon Crawford	31	8.0–23	3.0–12	4	3	1–0	0–0	1	1
Drew Duffin	28	2.5–8	0–0	1	0	0–0	0–0	0	0
Spain Cosby	23	2.5–8	0–0	0	0	0–0	0–0	0	0
Rene Perry	20	5.0–14	0–0	0	0	0–0	0–0	0	0

=== Special teams ===
Name	Punting							
Name	No.	Yds	Avg	Long	TB	FC	I20	Blkd
Chris Miller	45	1956	43.5	62	5	6	19	1

Name	Kicking				
Name	Field Goals	Pct	Long	Extra Points	Total points
Ian McGarvey	16–21	76.2	47	61–61	111

Name	Punt returns					Kick returns				
Name	No.	Yds	Avg	TD	Long	No.	Yds	Avg	TD	Long
B.J. Hill	18	229	12.7	0	72	10	260	26.0	0	34
Briggs Orsbon	1	14	14.0	0	14	0	0	0.0	0	0
Jeremy Hill	1	51	51.0	0	51	0	0	0.0	0	0
Torieal Gibson	0	0	0.0	0	0	28	603	21.5	0	66
Dante Love	0	0	0.0	0	0	10	267	26.7	0	38

== Roster ==
70 Applegate, Jordan C 6–5 301 Jr. Sr. Fort Wayne, Ind. (Snider)

67 Arnold, Travis OT 6–8 284 So. Jr. Fort Wayne, Ind. (Snider)

25 Baker, Sean SS 6–1 205 Fr. So. Canfield, Ohio (Canfield)

16 Barajas, Blake DB 6–0 195 Fr. Fr. Upland, Ind. (Eastbrook)

56 Barinaga, Gonzalo DT 6–2 256 Sr. 5Sr. 4L Milwaukee, Wis. (Marquette)

34 Barker, Jeff DE 6–5 215 Fr. Fr. Lowell, Ind. (Lowell)

27 Beane, Trent WR 6–0 195 Fr. Fr. Bloomington, Ind. (North)

59 Beasley, Antonio SLB 6–0 219 Sr. 5Sr. 3L Fort Wayne, Ind. (Northrop)

71 Brewster, Robert OT 6–5 310 Sr. Sr. 4L Cincinnati, Ohio (Wyoming)

11 Brown, Wendell MLB 6–0 214 Sr. 5Sr. 4L Detroit, Mich. (Martin Luther King)

30 Buckingham, John DE 6–1 221 So. Jr. Greenwood, Ind. (Center Grove)

8 Buice, Trey CB 5–10 175 Sr. Sr. 4L Stone Mountain, Ga. (Tucker)

19 Burch, Koreen CB 5–9 162 So. So. 1L Broxton, Ga. (Coffee)

20 Carnegie, Brandon CB 5–11 183 So. So. 1L Novi, Mich. (Novi)

47 Choy, Brendan TE 6–4 247 Fr. So. HS Bradenton, Fla. (Lakewood Ranch)

58 Cole, Adam OT 6–6 278 Sr. 5Sr. 2L Eden Prairie, Minn. (Academy of Holy Angels)

31 Cook, Dane FS 6–0 186 So. Jr. Eaton, Ind. (Delta)

51 Cornwell, Kyle OG 6–4 272 Sr. Sr. 4L New Lenox, Ill. (Providence Catholic)

48 Cosby, Spain MLB 5–11 212 Jr. Jr. 2L Carrollton, Ga. (Villa Rica)

24 Cravens, James HB 5–11 210 Fr. Fr. HS Centerville, Ohio (Centerville)

90 Crawford, Brandon DE 6–3 260 Jr. Sr. 2L Fort Wayne, Ind. (South)

69 Davis, Chad OL 6–3 263 Jr. Sr. HS Pendleton, Ind. (Pendleton Heights)

13 Davis, Nate QB 6–2 217 Jr. Jr. 2L Bellaire, Ohio (Bellaire)

28 Dawson, Andre WR 6–0 172 Fr. Fr. Lewis Center, Ohio (Olentangy)

65 Duffin, Drew DT 6–3 255 Jr. Sr. 2L Avon, Ind. (Avon)

91 Eddins, Robert DE 6–3 224 So. Jr. 1L Detroit, Mich. (Crockett)

2 Edmonds, Frank HB 5–8 181 So. So. 1L Cleveland, Ohio (St. Edward)

78 Gall, Kevin OT 6–5 245 Fr. So. Granger, Ind. (Penn)

14 Garner, Perci QB 6–1 222 So. So. HS Dover, Ohio (Dover)

52 Gerberry, Dan C 6–3 292 Sr. 5Sr. 3L Austintown, Ohio (Austintown Fitch)

80 Gibson, Torieal WR 5–9 165 Fr. Fr. HS Cleveland, Ohio (Glenville)

82 Grant, Madaris TE 6–5 222 Jr. Sr. 2L Cincinnati, Ohio (Mount Healthy)

54 Gray, Jerrod NT 6–3 253 Fr. So. HS Bradley, Ill. (Bourbonnais)

15 Gregory, Jakeem CB 5–9 170 So. Jr. Fort Wayne, Ind. (Snider)

49 Haines, Bryant WLB 6–5 223 Sr. 5Sr. 4L Piqua, Ohio (Piqua)

44 Hartke, Ryan SLB 6–4 200 Fr. So. St. Henry, Ohio (St. Henry)

15 Hemm, Justin QB 5–11 185 Fr. Fr. HS Piqua, Ohio (Piqua)

6 Henry, Derrick FS 6–1 189 So. So. 1L Columbus, Ohio (Worthington Kilbourne)

3 Hill, B.J. CB 5–7 180 Sr. Sr. 4L Lanham, Md. (Riverdale Baptist)

88 Hill, Darius TE 6–6 236 Sr. 5Sr. 4L Blue Springs, Mo. (Blue Springs)

83 Hill, Jeremy WR 6–2 175 Fr. Fr. Marietta, Ga (Marietta)

29 Hogue, Jake PK 5–9 195 So. Jr. 1L Plainfield, Ind. (Plainfield)

23 Hoke, Kyle S 5–11 190 Fr. Fr. HS Sugar Land, Texas (Clements)

77 Holtz, Austin OL 6–5 290 Fr. Fr. Holt, Mich. (Holt)

97 Houston, Jermaine DE 6–4 241 Sr. 5Sr. Newberry, S.C. (Newberry)

46 Howard, Joshua FS 6–1 190 Fr. Fr. Inkster, Mich. (Inkster)

18 Hunt, Michael HB 5–6 170 So. Jr. South Bend, Ind. (Riley)

66 Hunter, Kreg OL 6–3 284 Fr. So. Lebanon, Ind. (Lebanon)

4 Ifft, Daniel WR 6–3 181 So. So. 2L Dover, Ohio (Dover)

57 Jacoby, Ben C 6–2 263 Fr. So. Lawrenceville, Ga. (Buford)

96 Jankowski, Jason DT 6–2 262 So. Jr. Heartland, Wis. (Arrowhead)

81 Johnson, Louis WR 6–1 177 Sr. 5Sr. 4L Muncie, Ind. (Central)

42 Jones, Davyd MLB 6–1 200 So. So. 2L Muncie, Ind. (Central)

18 Jordan, Zac FS 5–10 196 Fr. So. Cincinnati, Ohio (Elder)

17 Justice, Tanner QB 6–3 196 Jr. Sr. Indianapolis, Ind. (Cathedral)

41 Keller, Sean DB 5–10 185 So. Jr. Malnerville, Ohio (Kings)

76 Kennedy, Rayondon OL 6–2 259 Fr. So. Dolton, Ill. (Mount Carmel)

43 Kilburn, Tad FS 6–0 182 So. Jr. Middletown, Ohio (Monroe)

28 King, Aaron HB 5–10 200 Fr. Fr. HS Saratoga Springs, NY (Carmel)

38 Knipp, Alex SS 6–0 194 Jr. Jr. 2L Amherst, Ohio (Steele)

18 Kovanda, Scott P 6-3 190 Fr. Fr. HS Hartland, Mich. (Detroit Catholic Central)

9 Kuntz, Kyle SS 5–10 193 Jr. Sr. Vandalia, Ohio (Butler)

33 Lewis, MiQuale HB 5–6 184 Jr. Jr. 2L Fort Wayne, Ind. (Snider)

12 Lewis, Trey CB 6–0 190 Sr. 5Sr. 4L Raleigh, N.C. (Ravenscroft)

72 Lowry, Cameron OT 6–6 255 Fr. Fr. HS Indianapolis, Ind. (Pike)

94 Manick, Dan DL 6–4 265 Fr. Fr. HS Dyer, Ind. (Lake Central)

26 McGarvey, Ian PK/P 5-9 210 So. So. 2L Greenwood, Ind. (Center Grove)

99 Meeks, Kenny SLB 6–2 230 Sr. 5Sr. 4L Muncie, Ind. (Central)

35 Miller, Chris P 6-2 211 Sr. 5Sr. 4L Liberty, Ill. (Carmel)

93 Morris, Adam OL 6–0 305 Fr. Fr. HS Dublin, Ohio (Scioto)

53 Muhlenkamp, Cody LS 5–11 203 So. Jr. 2L Coldwater, Ohio (Coldwater)

68 Myers, Devin OT 6–5 260 Fr. Fr. HS Westfield, Ind. (Westfield)

16 Orsbon, Briggs WR 6–0 185 Fr. Fr. HS Convoy, Ohio (Crestview)

21 Overton, Wade WR 6–3 200 Sr. 5Sr. 1L Indianapolis, Ind. (Lawrence North)

5 Page, Kelly QB 6–3 210 Fr. Fr. HS Sunnyvale, Texas (Mesquite)

95 Perry, Rene NT 5–11 271 So. So. 2L Lake City, Fla. (Columbia)

44 Pettit, Kyle CB 6–2 180 Fr. Fr. HS Sunman, Ind. (East Central)

92 Pitcock, Jafe NT 6–2 262 Fr. So. Piqua, Ohio (Piqua)

41 Puthoff, Andrew DT 6–3 254 Fr. So. St. Henry, Ohio (St. Henry)

79 Ramsey, Andre OT 6–5 304 Sr. Sr. 4L Cordele, Ga. (Crisp County)

36 Rolf, Pete DE 6–4 246 Fr. So. HS Salt Lake City, Utah (Piqua)

15 Scheidt, Reid SS 6–2 195 So. Jr. Lake Village, Ind. (North Newton)

14 Schott, Steven PK 6–1 165 Fr. Fr. HS Massillon, Ohio (Washington)

84 Sharick, Drew TE 6–6 230 Fr. So. Champaign, Ill. (Central)

74 Switzer, Michael OL 6–5 277 So. So. 2L Indianapolis, Ind. (Lawrence North)

7 Sykes, Cory HB 5–7 155 Fr. Fr. HS Harvey, Ill. (Thornton)

87 Trempe, Myles WR 6–4 202 So. Jr. 1L Springfield, Ohio (St. Paris Graham)

98 Warmoth, Ryan DB 6–1 205 Fr. Fr. HS Mishawaka, Ind. (Mishawaka)

37 White, Rashaad HB 5–9 205 Fr. Fr. HS Rex, Ga. (Stockbridge)

28 Winkler, Ray HB 5–9 182 So. So. South Bend, Ind. (St. Joseph's)

32 Womack, Lorren WLB 6–0 221 Fr. So. Huber Heights, Ohio (Wayne)

85 Woodard, Justin DE 6–3 222 So. Jr. 1L LaGrange, Ga. (Troup County)

64 Woods, Kaylon DT 6–2 254 So. Jr. Jacksonville, Fla. (First Coast)

55 Woodworth, Sam WLB 6–2 202 Jr. Sr. Elkhart, Ind. (Central)

63 Yoder, Steve OL 6–3 300 Fr. Fr. HS Canal Fulton, Ohio (Massillon Washington)
