= 1982 West Georgia Braves football team =

American college football season

1982 West Georgia Braves football

NCAA Division III champion

Stagg Bowl, W 14–0 vs. Augustana (IL)
- Conference: Independent
- Record: 12–0
- Head coach: Bobby Pate (2nd season)
- Home stadium: Grisham Stadium

1982 NCAA Division III independents football records
	Conf.			Overall
Team	W	L	T	W		L		T
West Georgia ^		–		12	–	0	–	0
Wabash		–		10	–	0	–	0
Union (NY)		–		8	–	1	–	0
Wagner ^		–		8	–	1	–	1
DePauw		–		8	–	2	–	0
Frostburg State		–		6	–	2	–	2
Albany		–		6	–	3	–	0
Canisius		–		6	–	3	–	0
Duquesne		–		6	–	3	–	0
Millsaps		–		6	–	3	–	0
WPI		–		5	–	3	–	0
Iona		–		5	–	3	–	1
Dayton		–		6	–	4	–	0
Hofstra		–		6	–	4	–	0
Norwich		–		6	–	4	–	0
Colorado College		–		5	–	4	–	0
Salisbury State		–		5	–	4	–	0
Buffalo		–		5	–	5	–	0
Mercyhurst		–		4	–	5	–	0
San Diego		–		4	–	5	–	0
Buffalo State		–		4	–	6	–	0
Cortland		–		4	–	6	–	0
Georgetown		–		3	–	5	–	0
St. Norbert		–		3	–	7	–	0
Grove City		–		2	–	7	–	0
Merchant Marine		–		2	–	7	–	0
Fordham		–		2	–	8	–	0
Rochester (NY)		–		2	–	8	–	0
Brockport		–		1	–	8	–	0
Saint Francis (PA)		–		0	–	8	–	1
^ – NCAA Division III playoff participant

The 1982 West Georgia Braves football team was an American football team that represented West Georgia College (now known as the University of West Georgia) as an independent during the 1982 NCAA Division III football season. In their second season under head coach Bobby Pate, the Braves compiled a 12–0 record and won the NCAA Division III championship.

During its undefeated regular season, the team scored an average of 42.1 points per game while holding opponents to 4.6 points per game. The season included a Sunday afternoon game against Millsaps intended to fill the void for television viewers during the 1982 NFL strike.

In the postseason, West Georgia faced Widener in the Division III South Region Championship game. Widener had spoiled West Georgia's undefeated 1981 season in that year's playoffs. West Georgia prevailed in the rematch by a 31–24 score. West Georgia then went on to shut out Augustana (Illinois), 14–0, in the Amos Alonzo Stagg Bowl to win the Division III national championship.

The team played its home games at Grisham Stadium in Carrollton, Georgia.

== Schedule ==
Date	Opponent	Site	Result	Attendance	Source
September 18	Miles	Grisham Stadium; Carrollton, GA	W 38–6	9,000	
September 25	Baptist	Grisham Stadium; Carrollton, GA	W 45–0	7,500–10,422	
October 2	at Millsaps	Alumni Field; Jackson, MS	W 41–6	2,500	
October 9	Hampden-Sydney	Grisham Stadium; Carrollton, GA	W 48–0	5,000–7,000	
October 16	Knoxville^{†}	Grisham Stadium; Carrollton, GA	W 45–3	6,000–6,500	
October 23	at Randolph–Macon	Day Stadium; Ashland, VA	W 34–0	935	
October 30	at UCF	Tangerine Bowl; Orlando, FL	W 41–7	9,257	
November 6	Morehouse	Grisham Stadium; Carrollton, GA	W 42–6	6,500	
November 13	Maryville	Grisham Stadium; Carrollton, GA	W 45–13	4,500	
November 20	Widener	Grisham Stadium; Carrollton, GA (NCAA Division III quarterfinal)	W 31–24 ^{OT}	7,200	
November 27	Bishop (TX)	Grisham Stadium; Carrollton, GA (NCAA Division III semifinal)	W 27–6		
December 4	vs. Augustana (IL)	Phoenix City, AL (Stagg Bowl—NCAA Division III championship game)	W 14–0	8,000	
^{†}Homecoming
