= 1982 Wabash Little Giants football team =

American college football season

1982 Wabash Little Giants football
- Conference: Independent
- Record: 10–0
- Head coach: Stan Parrish (5th season)
- Home stadium: Little Giant Stadium

1982 NCAA Division III independents football records
	Conf.			Overall
Team	W	L	T	W		L		T
West Georgia ^		–		12	–	0	–	0
Wabash		–		10	–	0	–	0
Union (NY)		–		8	–	1	–	0
Wagner ^		–		8	–	1	–	1
DePauw		–		8	–	2	–	0
Frostburg State		–		6	–	2	–	2
Albany		–		6	–	3	–	0
Canisius		–		6	–	3	–	0
Duquesne		–		6	–	3	–	0
Millsaps		–		6	–	3	–	0
WPI		–		5	–	3	–	0
Iona		–		5	–	3	–	1
Dayton		–		6	–	4	–	0
Hofstra		–		6	–	4	–	0
Norwich		–		6	–	4	–	0
Colorado College		–		5	–	4	–	0
Salisbury State		–		5	–	4	–	0
Buffalo		–		5	–	5	–	0
Mercyhurst		–		4	–	5	–	0
San Diego		–		4	–	5	–	0
Buffalo State		–		4	–	6	–	0
Cortland		–		4	–	6	–	0
Georgetown		–		3	–	5	–	0
St. Norbert		–		3	–	7	–	0
Grove City		–		2	–	7	–	0
Merchant Marine		–		2	–	7	–	0
Fordham		–		2	–	8	–	0
Rochester (NY)		–		2	–	8	–	0
Brockport		–		1	–	8	–	0
Saint Francis (PA)		–		0	–	8	–	1
^ – NCAA Division III playoff participant

The 1982 Wabash Little Giants football team was an American football team that represented Wabash College as an independent during the 1982 NCAA Division III football season. In their fifth year under head coach Stan Parrish, the Little Giants compiled a perfect 10–0 record and outscored opponents by a total of 293 to 117. Despite the perfect record, Wabash was not invited to participate in the NCAA Division III playoffs.

The team's statistical leaders included David Broecker with 2,172 yards of total offense and 1,743 passing yards; Eugene Anderson with 568 rushing yards and 60 points scored; and Nick Crnkovich with 473 receiving yards.

== Schedule ==
Date	Opponent	Site	Result	Attendance	Source
September 11	Hope	Little Giant Stadium; Crawfordsville, IN	W 27–7	4,000	
September 18	at Denison	Granville, OH	W 28–7	900	
September 25	Albion	Little Giant Stadium; Crawfordsville, IN	W 17–0	3,000	
October 2	at Millikin	Decatur, IL	W 25–14	3,0000	
October 9	at Washington University	St. Louis, MO	W 39–0	750	
October 16	at Rose–Hulman	Terre Haute, IN	W 34–0	700	
October 23	Wheaton (IL)	Little Giant Stadium; Crawfordsville, IN	W 41–36	5,400	
October 30	Dayton	Little Giant Stadium; Crawfordsville, IN	W 14–13	4,500	
November 6	Illinois Wesleyan	Little Giant Stadium; Crawfordsville, IN	W 37–34	1,000	
November 13	DePauw	Little Giant Stadium; Crawfordsville, IN (Monon Bell)	W 31–6	9,500	
