= Jon Hoke =

American football player and coach (born 1957)

No. 47
- Position: Defensive back

Personal information
- Born: January 24, 1957 (age 69); Hamilton, Ohio, U.S.
- Listed height: 5 ft 11 in (1.80 m)
- Listed weight: 175 lb (79 kg)

Career information
- High school: Fairmont East (Kettering, Ohio)
- College: Ball State
- NFL draft: 1980: undrafted

Career history

Playing
- Kansas City Chiefs (1980)*; Chicago Bears (1980)
- * Offseason or practice squad member only

Coaching
- Dayton (1982) Defensive backs coach; Bowling Green (1983–1986) Defensive backs coach & special teams coordinator; San Diego State (1987–1988) Defensive backs coach & special teams coordinator; Kent State (1989–1992) Defensive backs coach; Kent State (1993) Defensive coordinator & defensive backs coach; Missouri (1994–1998) Defensive backs coach; Florida (1999) Defensive coordinator & defensive backs coach; Florida (2000–2001) Assistant head coach, defensive coordinator, & defensive backs coach; Houston Texans (2002–2008) Defensive backs coach; Chicago Bears (2009–2014) Defensive backs coach; South Carolina (2015) Co-defensive coordinator & defensive backs coach; Tampa Bay Buccaneers (2016–2018) Defensive backs coach; Maryland (2019–2020) Defensive coordinator; Atlanta Falcons (2021–2022) Secondary coach; Chicago Bears (2023–2024) Passing game coordinator & cornerbacks coach
- Stats at Pro Football Reference

Jonathan David Hoke (born January 24, 1957) is an American former professional football defensive back and current coach who most recently served as the passing game coordinator and cornerbacks coach for the Chicago Bears of the National Football League (NFL). He has previously served as the defensive coordinator at the University of Maryland, College Park from 2019 to 2020, and also served as the defensive backs coach for the Atlanta Falcons, Tampa Bay Buccaneers, and Houston Texans.

== Playing career ==
Hoke played high school football at Fairmont East High School in Kettering, Ohio. He then attended Ball State University, where he played defensive back on the football team. Hoke was a two-time all-Mid-American Conference (MAC) selection and his team earned league titles in 1976 and 1978.

Hoke spent time in the NFL as a player with the Chicago Bears and Kansas City Chiefs from 1980 to 1981.

== Coaching career ==
=== College ===
Hoke embarked on a coaching career in 1982. As a secondary coach, he served at the University of Dayton, North Carolina State University, and Bowling Green State University. Hoke was hired by head coach Denny Stolz at Bowling Green and then him when Stolz was hired at San Diego State University. After Stolz's dismissal at San Diego State, Hoke went Kent State University, the University of Missouri, and the University of Florida.

Hoke served as defensive coordinator for Kent State in 1993 and Florida from 1999 to 2001. At Florida, Hoke replaced friend Bob Stoops, who had left to become the head coach at Oklahoma. Hoke and Stoops had served on the same Kent State staff in 1989 under Dick Crum, and Stoops recommended Hoke as his successor. Hoke left Florida when Gators head coach Steve Spurrier took the head coaching job with the Washington Redskins of the National Football League (NFL).

When Spurrier returned to college football to coach South Carolina in 2004, he asked Hoke to join him as defensive coordinator. After deliberating with his family, Hoke declined Spurrier's offer.

On Wednesday, February 4, 2015, Hoke re-joined Spurrier, this time at South Carolina.

In 2019, Hoke was hired as the defensive coordinator at the University of Maryland, College Park under head coach Mike Locksley. Hoke was a Broyles Award nominee in 2020 for best assistant coach in college football.

=== National Football League ===
==== Houston Texans ====
Hoke joined the expansion Houston Texans of the NFL in 2002 as secondary coach under Dom Capers, and was retained by new head coach Gary Kubiak in 2005.

==== Chicago Bears ====
Hoke joined the Chicago Bears as defensive backs coach under head coach Lovie Smith in 2009, taking over for Steven Wilks. In 2012, the Minnesota Vikings asked the Bears for permission to interview Hoke for their vacant defensive coordinator position, but were denied.

Hoke was one of two Smith assistants to be retained by new Bears head coach Marc Trestman for the 2013 season.

On January 21, 2015, the Bears announced that Ed Donatell had been hired as the defensive backs coach under new head coach John Fox. Hoke was informed by the Bears that his contract would not be optioned and he would not be asked to return.

==== Tampa Bay Buccaneers ====
On January 16, 2016, Hoke was hired as the defensive backs coach for the Tampa Bay Buccaneers

==== Atlanta Falcons ====
On January 26, 2021, Hoke was hired by the Atlanta Falcons as their defensive backs coach under head coach Arthur Smith. He was fired on January 27, 2023.

==== Chicago Bears (second stint) ====
On February 1, 2023, the Chicago Bears announced that Hoke was hired as their new cornerbacks coach and passing game coordinator. On January 24, 2025, it was announced that Hoke would not return to the Bears in 2025.

== Personal life ==
Hoke is the older brother of Brady Hoke, who was previously the head football coach at the University of Michigan until December 2, 2014.

Hoke and his wife, Jody, have four children: Mallory, Kyle, and twins Kendall and Carly. Kyle Hoke played college football for his uncle Brady at Ball State and served as a graduate assistant coach for Western Michigan, Army and South Carolina. Kyle is currently a defensive analyst at Texas A & M. He previously was the safeties coach at San Diego State University 2020 and served as the defensive coordinator at John Carroll.
