= 1982 Buffalo Bulls football team =

American college football season

1982 Buffalo Bulls football
- Conference: Independent
- Record: 5–5
- Head coach: Bill Dando (6th season)
- Captains: Timothy Najuch; John White; Brian Wilson; Michael Rossi
- Home stadium: Rotary Field

1982 NCAA Division III independents football records
	Conf.			Overall
Team	W	L	T	W		L		T
West Georgia ^		–		12	–	0	–	0
Wabash		–		10	–	0	–	0
Union (NY)		–		8	–	1	–	0
Wagner ^		–		8	–	1	–	1
DePauw		–		8	–	2	–	0
Frostburg State		–		6	–	2	–	2
Albany		–		6	–	3	–	0
Canisius		–		6	–	3	–	0
Duquesne		–		6	–	3	–	0
Millsaps		–		6	–	3	–	0
WPI		–		5	–	3	–	0
Iona		–		5	–	3	–	1
Dayton		–		6	–	4	–	0
Hofstra		–		6	–	4	–	0
Norwich		–		6	–	4	–	0
Colorado College		–		5	–	4	–	0
Salisbury State		–		5	–	4	–	0
Buffalo		–		5	–	5	–	0
Mercyhurst		–		4	–	5	–	0
San Diego		–		4	–	5	–	0
Buffalo State		–		4	–	6	–	0
Cortland		–		4	–	6	–	0
Georgetown		–		3	–	5	–	0
St. Norbert		–		3	–	7	–	0
Grove City		–		2	–	7	–	0
Merchant Marine		–		2	–	7	–	0
Fordham		–		2	–	8	–	0
Rochester (NY)		–		2	–	8	–	0
Brockport		–		1	–	8	–	0
Saint Francis (PA)		–		0	–	8	–	1
^ – NCAA Division III playoff participant

The 1982 Buffalo Bulls football team represented the University at Buffalo as an independent during the 1982 NCAA Division III football season. Led by Bill Dando in his sixth season as head coach, the team compiled a record of 5–5.

== Schedule ==
Date	Time	Opponent	Site	Result	Attendance	Source
September 11		at Cortland	Cortland, NY	L 28–31	4,200	
September 18		at Baldwin–Wallace	Berea, OH	L 26–31	5,000	
September 25		Rochester	Rotary Field; Buffalo, NY	W 14–13	2,553	
October 2		Buffalo State	Rotary Field; Buffalo, NY	W 44–3	4,210	
October 9	1:30 p.m.	at Canisius	War Memorial Stadium; Buffalo, NY	W 35–13	2,250	
October 16		Ithaca	Rotary Field; Buffalo, NY	L 14–18	736	
October 23		Brockport	Rotary Field; Buffalo, NY	W 52–13	2,408	
October 30		Norwich	Rotary Field; Buffalo, NY	L 15–20	1,527	
November 6		at Albany	University Field; Albany, NY	W 42–14	1,500	
November 13		at Alfred	Alfred Field; Alfred, NY	L 21–24	1,320	
All times are in Eastern time
