= Jeff Hecklinski =

American football player and coach (born 1974)

Biographical details
- Born: February 18, 1974 (age 52); Palatine, Illinois, U.S.

Playing career
- 1994: Illinois
- 1995–1997: Western Illinois
- 1998: Albany Firebirds

Coaching career (HC unless noted)
- 1998: Benedictine (QB/WR)
- 1999–2000: Fort Scott C.C. (OC)
- 2001–2002: Central Missouri St. (OC)
- 2003: Arizona (QB/PGC)
- 2004–2008: Ball State (WR)
- 2009–2010: San Diego State (AHC/RB)
- 2011–2014: Michigan (WR)
- 2015: CSU Pueblo (QB/PGC)
- 2016: Illinois (TE/ST)
- 2017–2018: Indiana State (OC/QB/RC)
- 2019: Kansas (TE)
- 2020–2022: San Diego State (OC/QB)

Jeff Hecklinski (born February 18, 1974) is an American football coach and former player. He was most recently the offensive coordinator and quarterbacks coach at San Diego State University from 2020–2022.

A highly-rated high school quarterback, Hecklinski enrolled at the University of Illinois in 1993, but transferred to Western Illinois University (WIU) in 1995. He became the second-leading passer in WIU history with nearly 6,000 career passing yards. After college, he played for the Albany Firebirds of the Arena Football League in 1998.

He has been a college football coach since 1998. He has previously had stints as the quarterbacks coach and passing game coordinator for Arizona (2003), wide receivers coach at Ball State (2009–2010), assistant head coach and running backs coach at San Diego State, wide receivers coach at Michigan (2011–2014), quarterbacks coach and passing game coordinator at CSU Pueblo (2015), tight ends and special teams coach at Illinois (2016), offensive coordinator at Indiana State (2017–2018), and tight ends coach at Kansas (2019).

== Player ==
Hecklinski played high school football in Palatine, Illinois, and was rated as the top quarterback prospect in the Midwest. SuperPrep magazine rated him as one of the top three prospects in the country.

He enrolled at the University of Illinois in 1993. After a redshirt season in 1993, Hecklinski lost a three-way battle for the starting quarterback position in 1994. In 1995, he transferred to Western Illinois University (WIU). He became the second quarterback in WIU history to pass for 5,000 yards and finished his career with nearly 6,000 passing yards. He also played in the Arena Football League in 1998 for the Albany Firebirds.

== Coaching career ==
Hecklinski has been a college football coach since 1998, including a stint as the quarterbacks coach and passing game coordinator for the Arizona Wildcats. In 2004, he joined Brady Hoke's coaching staff as the wide receivers coach at Ball State. When Hoke took the head coaching job at San Diego State in 2009, Hecklinski joined him as the Aztecs' assistant head coach, running backs coach, and recruiting coordinator. When Hoke took the head coaching position at the University of Michigan in 2011, Hecklinski again followed and became Michigan's wide receivers coach and recruiting coordinator. In January 2012, he was the subject of press coverage after Michigan State head coach Mark Dantonio cut off Hecklinski's presentation at the Michigan High School Football Coaches Association Winners' Circle Clinic.

San Diego State University hired Hecklinski as the offensive coordinator and quarterbacks coach in 2020. He was fired midway through the 2022 season.

== Personal life ==
Hecklinski and his wife, Tiffany, have three children: a daughter, Riley, and two sons, Mikey and JR. His nephew Jeremy was named MaxPreps HS 2023 Player of the Year in Georgia and is now at Iowa.
