= West Georgia Wolves football =

American college football program

2026 West Georgia Wolves football team
- First season: 1946; 80 years ago
- Athletic director: Jason Carmichael
- Head coach: Steve Englehart; 1st season, 1–10 (.091)
- Location: Carrollton, Georgia
- Stadium: University Stadium (capacity: 10,000)
- NCAA division: Division I FCS
- Conference: UAC
- Colors: Blue and red
- All-time record: 245–244–0 (.501)

NCAA Division III championships
- 1982

Conference championships
- GSC: 1997, 1998, 2000, 2015
- Rivalries: Valdosta State
- Website: uwgathletics.com

The West Georgia Wolves football program represents the University of West Georgia (UWG) in college football. Previously an NCAA Division II team, they became a Division I Football Championship Subdivision (FCS) program as a member of the football-only version of the United Athletic Conference (UAC), an alliance between the Atlantic Sun Conference (ASUN) and Western Athletic Conference, effective July 1, 2024. In July 2026, the football-only UAC was merged into the Western Athletic Conference, which adopted the United Athletic Conference name. West Georgia was one of five full ASUN members, all of which had played football in the single-sport UAC, to join the all-sports UAC.

== History ==
The West Georgia football team, originally known as the Braves (which was the nickname until 2006), was founded in 1946, when the school, then known as West Georgia College, was a two-year institution. They had their first practice on September 30, 1946, with 54 players reporting, and ended their first season with a record of 2–5–1. Prior to the 1958 season, the school became a four-year institution, and the football team played one year with only freshmen and sophomores before being discontinued. In total, from 1946 to 1958, West Georgia won only 13 games.

On May 14, 1980, it was announced that West Georgia was reviving its football team, with intentions to play in 1981 as an NCAA Division III independent. Bobby Pate was hired as head coach and the team had around 385 players try out, with 115 making the squad. Despite them being in their first season in 23 years, West Georgia compiled a perfect 9–0 regular season record and reached the Division III playoffs, where they lost in the first round to the ultimate national champions Widener, by one score. In their second season back, West Georgia compiled a perfect 12–0 record and won the national championship with a shutout win over Augustana (IL).

The team moved up to the NCAA Division II level after two years in Division III, joining the Gulf South Conference (GSC), where they remained through 2023. In their GSC tenure, the Braves / Wolves won four conference championships (1997, 1998, 2000, 2015), two NCAA regional championships (2014, 2015) and reached the Division II playoffs nine times.

In 2023, it was announced that the team was moving to the NCAA Division I FCS level as a member of the United Athletic Conference (UAC), an alliance of the Atlantic Sun Conference (ASUN) and Western Athletic Conference (WAC), effective July 1, 2024. The single-sport UAC would merge into the WAC in 2026, with the WAC adopting the UAC name.

=== Classifications ===
- 1946–1958: Community college
- 1959–1980: No team
- 1981–1982: NCAA Division III
- 1983–2023: NCAA Division II
- 2024–present: NCAA Division I FCS

=== Conference affiliations ===
- 1946–1958: Unknown
- 1959–1980: No team
- 1981–1982: NCAA Division III independent
- 1983–2023: Gulf South Conference
- 2024–2025: United Athletic Conference (football-only)
- 2026–present: United Athletic Conference (all-sports)

== Program achievements ==
Gulf South Conference Champions	1997, 1998, 2000, 2015
NCAA Division II Team Playoff Participants	1995, 1996, 1998, 2000, 2014, 2015, 2017, 2018, 2021
NCAA Division II Regional Championships	2014, 2015
NCAA Division III Team Playoff Participants	1981, 1982
NCAA Division III Regional Championships	1982
NCAA Division III National Championships	1982

== Future non-conference opponents ==
Future non-conference opponents announced as of October 27, 2026.

2027	2028	2029	2030	2031	2032
at Chattanooga	at Troy	at Mississippi State	at Georgia State	at Vanderbilt	Chattanooga
at South Alabama	at Southeast Missouri	Stetson	at Montana State	Montana State	
Stetson		Southeast Missouri		at Chattanooga	
		at Auburn			
