= 2009 GMAC Bowl =

Ball State Cardinals	Tulsa Golden Hurricane
(12–1)	(10–3)
MAC	C-USA
13	45
Head coach: Stan Parrish	Head coach: Todd Graham
AP / Coaches / BCS; 23 / 22 / 22
	1	2	3	4	Total
Ball State	7	6	0	0	13
Tulsa	10	14	7	14	45
- Date: January 6, 2009
- Season: 2008
- Stadium: Ladd–Peebles Stadium
- Location: Mobile, Alabama
- MVP: RB Tarrion Adams, Tulsa
- Referee: Penn Wagers (SEC)
- Attendance: 32,816
- Payout: US$750,000 per team

United States TV coverage
- Network: ESPN
- Announcers: Dave Pasch, Andre Ware
- Nielsen ratings: 1.7

The 2009 GMAC Bowl was the tenth anniversary edition of the GMAC Bowl, an American college football bowl game. The contest was played on January 6, 2009, as part of the 2008 NCAA Division I FBS football season at Ladd–Peebles Stadium in Mobile, Alabama, and featured the Tulsa Golden Hurricane playing the Ball State Cardinals.

The game, which was played in a second-half driving rainstorm, was won by Tulsa, 45–13. This was Tulsa's second consecutive GMAC Bowl victory, having defeated Bowling Green in the 2008 GMAC Bowl.

== Scoring summary ==
Scoring Play	Score
1st Quarter
Tulsa - Damaris Johnson 30-yard TD pass from David Johnson (Jarod Tracy kick), 11:36	Tulsa 7–0
Ball State - Nate Davis 17-yard TD run (Ian McGarvey kick), 4:24	Tie 7-7
Tulsa - Tracy 31-yard FG, 2:04	Tulsa 10–7
2nd Quarter
Tulsa - Tarrion Adams 1-yard TD run (Tracy kick), 10:39	Tulsa 17–7
Ball State - McGarvey 40-yard FG, 6:36	Tulsa 17–10
Tulsa - Adams 56-yard TD run (Tracy kick), 4:50	Tulsa 24–10
Ball State - McGarvey 22-yard FG, :29	Tulsa 24–13
3rd Quarter
Tulsa - Slick Shelley 15-yard TD pass from David Johnson (Tracy kick), 12:12	Tulsa 31–13
4th Quarter
Tulsa - Adams 11-yard TD run (Tracy kick), 13:40	Tulsa 38–13
Tulsa - Jacob Frank 12-yard TD pass from David Johnson (Tracy kick), 10:40	Tulsa 45–13
