= Brady Hoke =

American football player and coach (born 1958)

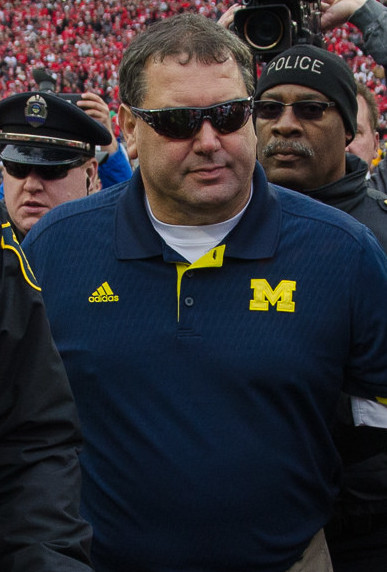
- Hoke at Michigan in 2014

Biographical details
- Born: November 3, 1958 (age 67); Dayton, Ohio, U.S.

Playing career
- 1977–1980: Ball State
- Position: Linebacker

Coaching career (HC unless noted)
- 1981–1982: Yorktown HS (IN) (DC)
- 1983: Grand Valley State (DL)
- 1984–1986: Western Michigan (ST/DL)
- 1987–1988: Toledo (ST/OLB)
- 1989–1990: Oregon State (ILB)
- 1991–1994: Oregon State (DL)
- 1995–1996: Michigan (DE)
- 1997–2001: Michigan (DL)
- 2002: Michigan (AHC/DL)
- 2003–2008: Ball State
- 2009–2010: San Diego State
- 2011–2014: Michigan
- 2016: Oregon (DC)
- 2017: Tennessee (AHC/DL)
- 2017: Tennessee (interim HC)
- 2018: Carolina Panthers (DL)
- 2019: San Diego State (DL)
- 2020–2023: San Diego State

Head coaching record
- Overall: 105–92
- Bowls: 3–4

Accomplishments and honors

Championships
- 1 MAC West Division (2008); 1 MW West Division (2021)

Awards
- MAC Coach of the Year (2008); AFCA Regional Coach of the Year (2008); 2× MW Coach of the Year (2010, 2021); Big Ten Coach of the Year (2011); MFC Collegiate Coach of the Year (2011); George Munger Award (2011)

Brady Patrick Hoke (/ˈhoʊk/; born November 3, 1958) is an American former football coach. He was most well known for serving as the head football coach at the University of Michigan from 2011 to 2014. He also served as the head football coach at Ball State (2003–2008) and San Diego State (2009–2010 & 2020–2023)

Hoke grew up in Ohio and attended Ball State University, where he played linebacker from 1977 to 1980. He began his coaching career in 1982 and held assistant coaching positions at Grand Valley State (1983), Western Michigan (1984–1986), Toledo (1987–1989), Oregon State (1989–1994), and Michigan (1995–2002).

Hoke left his assistant coaching position at Michigan in December 2002 to become the head football coach at his alma mater, Ball State. In six years at Ball State, Hoke was credited with turning around the football program. In 2008, he led the Ball State football team to a 12–1 record and the first appearance in the Associated Press Top 25 (peaking at No. 12) in school history. In December 2008, Hoke was hired as the head football coach at San Diego State University. He led the 2010 San Diego State Aztecs football team to the school's first season with at least nine wins since 1977 and a victory over Navy in the 2010 Poinsettia Bowl.

He returned to Michigan after he was hired as the program's 19th head football coach on January 11, 2011. In his inaugural season with the Wolverines, he led them to an 11–2 record, taking Michigan to their first BCS Bowl game since the 2006 season, where Michigan defeated the Virginia Tech Hokies in the 2012 Sugar Bowl. On December 2, 2014, Michigan fired Hoke after four seasons. He was also the interim head coach at the University of Tennessee at the end of the 2017 season.

== Early years ==
Hoke graduated from Fairmont East High School in Kettering, Ohio, in 1977. While at Fairmont East, Hoke played linebacker/defensive end and was also on the school's wrestling squad. His father, John Hoke, played for future Ohio State coach Woody Hayes at Miami University, alongside future Michigan coach Bo Schembechler. Despite his father's association with Hayes, Hoke recalled that, while he was growing up in Kettering, he was a Michigan fan. He went on to play football as a linebacker at Ball State University, where he was a four-year letterman from 1977 to 1980. Hoke helped the 1978 Ball State Cardinals football team win the Mid-American Conference (MAC) championship. He tallied 99 tackles as a sophomore, 95 as a junior and 150 as a senior. He was the captain of Ball State's 1980 team and was selected as a second-team All-MAC player.

== Coaching career ==
=== Assistant coach ===
Hoke began his coaching career in 1982 as the defensive coordinator and offensive line coach at Yorktown High School in Yorktown, Indiana.

Hoke began his college coaching career as the defensive line coach at Grand Valley State University in 1983. The following year, he joined Jack Harbaugh's staff at Western Michigan University. He was Western Michigan's defensive line coach from 1984 to 1986. Also on the coaching staff were current Baltimore Ravens head coach John Harbaugh, current Ohio State co-defensive coordinator Greg Mattison, and current Washington State offensive analyst Dan Ferrigno.

Hoke next served as the linebackers coach at the University of Toledo from 1987 to 1989.

Hoke served as an assistant coach at Oregon State University from 1989 to 1994 under head coaches Dave Kragthorpe and his successor Jerry Pettibone. He was the Beavers' defensive line coach in every season except 1990, when coached the inside linebackers. The Beavers went 4–7–1 and 1–10 in Hoke's first two years in Corvallis, resulting in the firing of Kragthorpe. Hoke was retained in 1991 by Oregon State's new head coach, Jerry Pettibone. The Beavers had consecutive one-win seasons in 1991 and 1992 and back-to-back four win seasons in 1993 and 1994. Despite the team's struggles, Hoke later credited Kragthorpe with teaching him many lessons: "One of the big things coach Pettibone instilled in me was the recruiting process, and the work ethic that it takes to recruit, and the other factors, as far as trying to get a team ready every week, coming off a couple of lean years, and the intenseness of the rivalry with Oregon."

In February 1995, Hoke was hired as an assistant coach at the University of Michigan under head coach Gary Moeller. He was the defensive end coach in 1995 and 1996 and defensive line coach from 1997 to 2002. In May 2002, Michigan head coach Lloyd Carr named Hoke as associate head coach, the only member of the staff with that distinction. At the time, Hoke told the press, "Every year you learn more and more what the head coach has to do. I'm very honored to represent this school. I grew up a big Michigan fan, and I think it's a place that's special in a lot of ways." During Hoke's eight years at Michigan, the Wolverines compiled a 75–23 record, went to a bowl game every year and won the national championship in 1997. While at Michigan, Hoke was assigned to recruit in California. One of the players Hoke recruited to Michigan was future legendary NFL quarterback Tom Brady. Hoke recalled: "Tom wasn't the greatest athlete, with those skinny legs, but there was something about him."

Although Hoke was an assistant under head coaches Moeller and Carr at Michigan, Bo Schembechler remained at Michigan in the early part of Hoke's tenure. Interviewed in 2009, Hoke recalled the example set by Schembechler: "When I was at Michigan, Bo Schembechler's office was five doors down from mine. Having the opportunity to talk with him on a daily basis was something that transferred those values that are most important if you're going to be successful."

=== Ball State ===
In December 2002, Hoke was hired as the 14th head football coach at his alma mater, Ball State University, signing a five-year contract at $125,000 per season. He was among a group of candidates to succeed Bill Lynch, which included Illinois secondary coach Mike Mallory, Ohio State linebackers coach Mark Snyder, and Wisconsin offensive coordinator Brian White. Hoke told reporters that the moment he heard the vacancy sign was out at Ball State, he knew he wanted to be the school's next head football coach: "There is no doubt." Hoke added, "It is great to return to the school that enabled me to get an education and play football. I am looking forward to representing a great university with integrity and pride." Michigan's head coach Lloyd Carr praised Hoke: "Brady has done a tremendous job at Michigan. He is a great recruiter. One of the things I try to do is hire people that have the potential to become head coaches. He is goal-oriented and has a great motivation to be the best that he can be."

Hoke took over a Ball State football program that had not had a winning record since 1996. Hoke's teams won only 10 games in his first three seasons as head coach. Hoke began to turn this around in his fourth year as the team finished 5–7 (5–3) in 2006. In 2007, the team improved to 7–5 in the regular season, as sophomore quarterback Nate Davis passed for 3,376 yards and 27 touchdowns. The 2007 Ball State team nearly upset the Nebraska Cornhuskers, but a late touchdown gave Nebraska a 41–40 win. The team was invited to play in the International Bowl in Toronto, losing to Rutgers, 52–30.

During the 2008 season, Hoke led the Cardinals to the most wins in school history, finishing the regular season with an undefeated record of 12–0. The 2008 season marked the first time the Ball State Cardinals won a game against a BCS-conference opponent, a 42–20 victory over Indiana. And in October 2008, Ball State was ranked in the Associated Press Top 25 for the first time in the school's history. After his team achieved its top 25 ranking, Hoke told the media, "It's flattering obviously, but there's so much season left to play. You have to evaluate the season at the end. We've got a lot of big games ahead of us." The Cardinals were ranked as high as #12 during the 2008 season. After concluding an undefeated regular season, Hoke's 2008 team lost to the Buffalo Bulls in the 2008 MAC Championship Game.

Ball State's rise to prominence led to Hoke's December 2008 appearance on the Late Show with David Letterman where he read a special "Top Ten List" of the "Highlights of the Ball State Cardinals Season", topped by "The Drunk 3 A.M. Coaching Tips from (Ball State alumnus) Letterman."

While at Ball State, several football players were caught in a scheme to sell textbooks for classes they were not enrolled in. The NCAA cut three football scholarships and put the University on two years probation. Nine other sports were involved in the scheme.

=== San Diego State ===
In December 2008, Hoke was hired as the 17th head football coach at San Diego State University. Hoke signed a five-year contract with a guaranteed payment of $3,525,000, plus incentives for hitting revenue marks and bowl berths. San Diego State was also required to pay $240,000 to buy out the remaining two years on Hoke's contract at Ball State. At the press conference introducing Hoke as the Aztecs' new coach, Hoke told reporters, "Number one, this program is going to be a program that's based on toughness. To play football at the Division I level, to compete academically at the Division I level and balance both, you have to be tough-minded. You have to be physically tough and mentally tough."

San Diego State compiled a 2–10 record the year before Hoke arrived. A sports writer for the San Diego Union-Tribune described the challenge facing Hoke: "It's going to be difficult for [Brady Hoke], because with the Aztecs, we're basically talking about a sea change in everything from A to Zed. This isn't Urban Meyer taking over at Florida, where the cupboard already was full of epicurean delights. State has rotting skeletons in its closet. The Aztecs haven't had a winning season since 1998, just seven since 1980."

Hoke won a reputation for recruiting at San Diego State. His brother Jon Hoke, an assistant coach in the NFL, noted: "I don't care where it is, whether it's San Diego State or anywhere else, if there's one thing he can do it's recruit. He's as good at it as anybody. He's relentless with recruiting. He has a great feel for parents and a great feel for players. As long as you give him the budget to (recruit) the way it needs to be done, he'll be fine."

In 2009, Hoke led the Aztecs to a record of 4–8. During the 2010 season, Hoke's team improved to 9–4. Two of the Aztecs' losses in 2010 came in close matches against ranked opponents. The Aztecs gave the undefeated, #2 TCU team its closest game of the regular season, losing by a score of 40–35. Hoke's team also lost a close game against No. 12 Missouri by a score of 27–24. The team concluded its season with a convincing 35–14 win over Navy in the 2010 Poinsettia Bowl.

Prior to the 2010 season, San Diego State had not won nine or more games in a season since 1977 (when they had their second straight 10 win season) and had not played in a bowl game since the 1998 team lost in the Las Vegas Bowl After the 2010 season, a reporter for the Orange County Register wrote that Hoke had given San Diego State "swagger."

=== Michigan ===
==== 2011 season ====
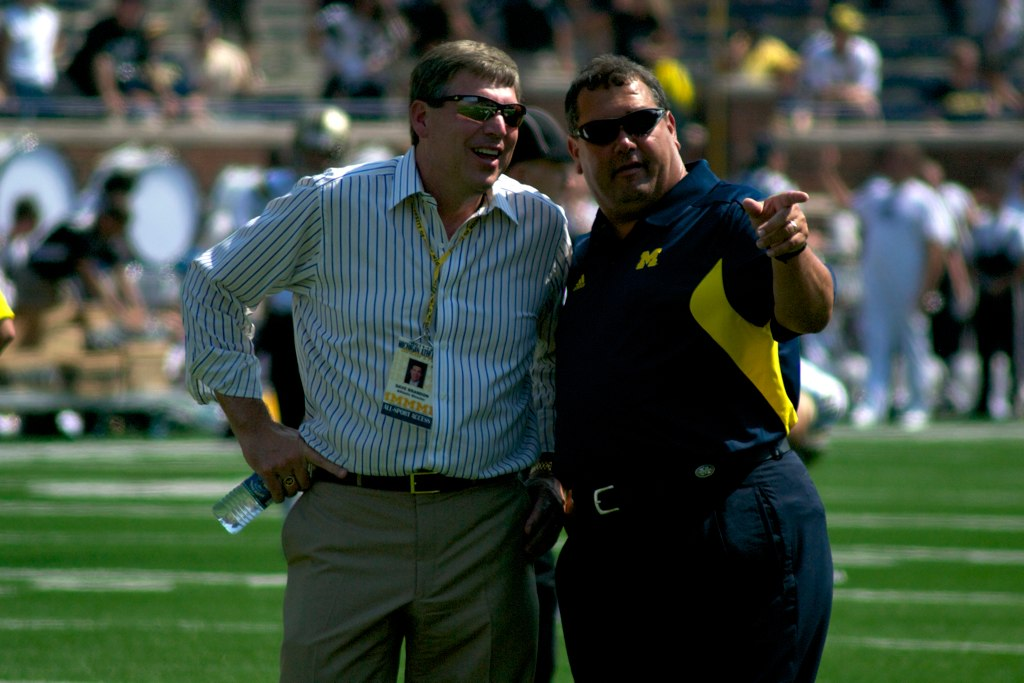
Brady Hoke (right) with Michigan athletic director Dave Brandon in 2011.

On January 11, 2011, Hoke was named the 19th head football coach of the Michigan Wolverines football team. Michigan athletic director Dave Brandon described some of the factors that influenced his selection of Hoke: "The reason I wanted him to be prominent in this process was simply the combination of turning around two programs, being known as a terrific recruiter, and being a defensive-minded coach with a lot of experience. Everybody that I ever talked to just raved about the quality of person he is and how much he loves Michigan." Although many speculated that Hoke had been a third choice behind Jim Harbaugh and Les Miles, Brandon stated, "The job was never offered to them."

On November 26, Hoke's Wolverines defeated Ohio State in Hoke's first season as the Wolverines' head coach, clinching Michigan's first 10-win season since 2006. Hoke's 2011 team also held Michigan's first winning record in Big Ten conference play since 2007. Michigan's win over Ohio State in the long-standing rivalry was its first since 2003.

Following the 2011 Big Ten Conference football season, Hoke swept the Big Ten Coach of the Year awards, earning the Hayes-Schembechler Coach of the Year, as selected by conference coaches, and the Dave McClain Coach of the Year, as picked by the media.

Hoke won his first bowl game as the head coach of Michigan in an overtime contest against Virginia Tech by a score of 23–20. It was Michigan's first BCS bowl victory since the 2000 Orange Bowl, and its 20th bowl victory overall.

==== 2012–2014 seasons ====
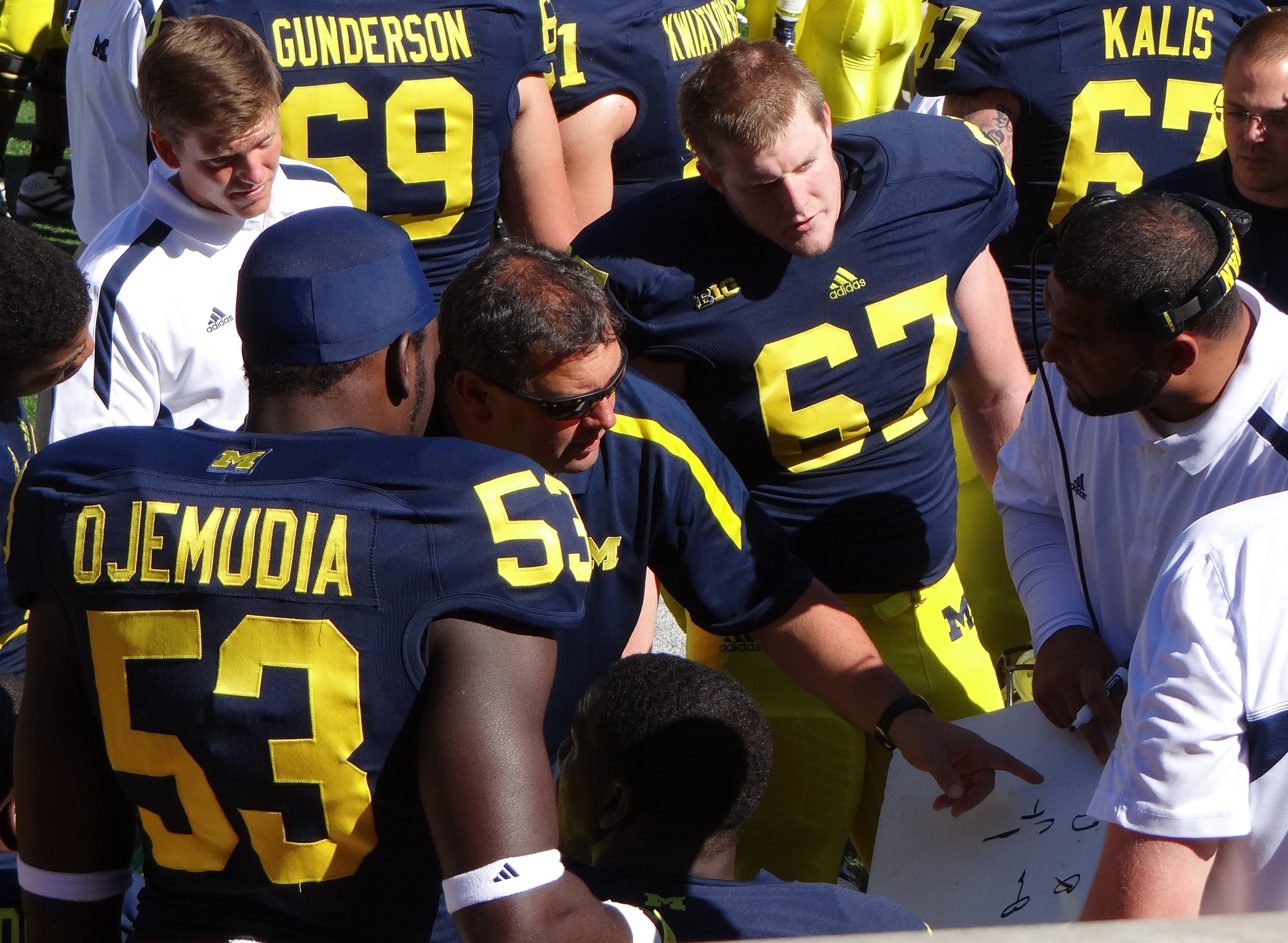
Hoke and Jerry Montgomery with defensive linemen in 2012.

Hoke's second season in Ann Arbor started off with Michigan losing 41–14 to the defending and eventual repeat national champions, the Alabama Crimson Tide. The Game was played at Cowboy Stadium on a neutral playing field, being broadcast to a nationally televised audience. Hoke said after the game "Obviously, we didn't play Michigan football, and that's something that bothers our team, bothers the coaches;" he continued "Win or lose your first game, you learn a lot." Michigan ended the regular season with losses to AP #25 Nebraska (10–4), #4 Notre Dame (12–1), #3 Ohio State (12–0), and #1 Alabama (13–1), before losing 33–28 on the final touchdown to #8 South Carolina in the Outback Bowl.

Hoke led the 2014 Michigan team to a 5–7 record. This marked only the third season since 1975 in which Michigan missed a bowl game (the previous two instances were both under Hoke's predecessor, Rich Rodriguez). The team defeated only one bowl-eligible opponent, with the win coming against Penn State.

Brady Hoke faced controversy for his handling of a head injury sustained by quarterback Shane Morris during a September 2014 game against Minnesota, where he allowed Morris to continue playing despite clear signs of a concussion. This incident, along with the team's poor performance, contributed to Hoke's firing shortly after the season ended.

Following the season, Michigan fired Hoke after four seasons. Hoke compiled a 31–20 record, including an 18–14 record in Big Ten play.

=== Back as assistant coach ===
==== Oregon ====
Hoke was announced as the University of Oregon's defensive coordinator on January 16, 2016. He was not retained by new coach Willie Taggart after the firing of Mark Helfrich.

==== Tennessee ====
Hoke was announced as the University of Tennessee's defensive line coach on February 7, 2017. On November 12, 2017, Butch Jones was terminated as head coach of the Volunteers. As a result, Hoke was named as the interim head coach. Hoke coached the last two games of the season, which were a 30–10 loss to #21 LSU and a 42–24 loss to Vanderbilt. The two losses under Hoke combined with the 4–6 record from Butch Jones gave the Tennessee Volunteers their first eight-loss season in program history.

==== NFL - Carolina Panthers ====
On January 29, 2018, ESPN reported that Hoke was hired to coach the defensive line for the NFL's Carolina Panthers. The move to the NFL was a first for Hoke's coaching career, as all of his previous stops had been in high school or college. He was fired on December 3.

==== San Diego State ====
Hoke returned to San Diego State University in 2019 as defensive line coach under head coach Rocky Long. Hoke helped the Aztecs fielded a defense that was second in rush defense allowing 75.4 yards per game and sixth in total defense allowing 287.8 yards per game in 2019.

=== Second stint as head coach at San Diego State ===
On January 8, 2020, Rocky Long announced his retirement from coaching and Hoke was named the head coach for the Aztecs. In the pandemic-shortened season of 2020, he led the Aztecs to a 4–4 record.

In the 2021 season, Hoke led the Aztecs to a 11–1 regular season record. They qualified for the MWC Championship, which they lost 46–13 to Utah State. San Diego State finished the season with a 38–24 win over UTSA in the Frisco Bowl. In the 2022 season, Hoke led the Aztecs to a 7–5 regular season record. The season ended with a 25–23 loss to MTSU in the Hawaii Bowl. On November 13, 2023, Hoke announced that he would retire at the end of the regular season. He finished his last season with the Aztecs with a 4–8 mark.

== Family ==
Hoke and his wife have a daughter, Kelly, who was born in 1986 and is also a Ball State graduate. Brady is the younger brother of Jon Hoke, who is the secondary coach for the Atlanta Falcons. Jon's son, Kyle Hoke, played for his uncle at Ball State and was a graduate assistant coach for the Western Michigan Broncos football team in their 2012 and 2013 seasons.

== Head coaching record ==
Year	Team	Overall	Conference	Standing	Bowl/playoffs	Coaches^{#}	AP^{°}
Ball State Cardinals (Mid-American Conference) (2003–2008)
2003	Ball State	4–8	3–5	T–4th (West)			
2004	Ball State	2–9	2–6	6th (West)			
2005	Ball State	4–7	4–4	5th (West)			
2006	Ball State	5–7	5–3	T–3rd (West)			
2007	Ball State	7–6	5–2	2nd (West)	L International		
2008	Ball State	12–1	8–0	1st (West)	GMAC*		
Ball State:		34–38	27–20	* Did not coach in bowl game.			
San Diego State Aztecs (Mountain West Conference) (2009–2010)
2009	San Diego State	4–8	2–6	7th			
2010	San Diego State	9–4	5–3	T–3rd	W Poinsettia		
Michigan Wolverines (Big Ten Conference) (2011–2014)
2011	Michigan	11–2	6–2	2nd (Legends)	W Sugar^{†}	9	12
2012	Michigan	8–5	6–2	2nd (Legends)	L Outback		24
2013	Michigan	7–6	3–5	5th (Legends)	L Buffalo Wild Wings		
2014	Michigan	5–7	3–5	T–4th (East)			
Michigan:		31–20	18–14				
Tennessee Volunteers (Southeastern Conference) (2017)
2017	Tennessee	0–2	0–2	7th (Eastern)			
Tennessee:		0–2	0–2				
San Diego State Aztecs (Mountain West Conference) (2020–2023)
2020	San Diego State	4–4	4–2	4th			
2021	San Diego State	12–2	7–1	1st (West)	W Frisco		25
2022	San Diego State	7–6	5–3	T–2nd (West)	L Hawaii		
2023	San Diego State	4–8	2–6	T–10th			
San Diego State:		40–32	25–21				
Total:		105–92					
National championship Conference title Conference division title or championship game berth
^{†}Indicates BCS bowl.; ^{#}Rankings from final Coaches Poll.; ^{°}Rankings from final AP Poll.
