= 1982 NCAA Division III football season =

American college football season

- Regular season: August – November 1982
- Playoffs: November – December 1982
- National championship: Garrett-Harrison Stadium; Phenix City, AL
- Champion: West Georgia

The 1982 NCAA Division III football season, part of college football in the United States organized by the National Collegiate Athletic Association at the Division III level, began in August 1982, and concluded with the NCAA Division III Football Championship, also known as the Stagg Bowl, in December 1982 at Garrett-Harrison Stadium in Phenix City, Alabama.

The West Georgia Wolves won their first Division III championship, defeating the Augustana (IL) Vikings by a final score of 14−0.

== Conference changes and new programs ==
=== New conference ===
- The Minnesota Intercollegiate Athletic Conference, and its nine members all from Minnesota, became an NCAA Division III conference this season, transitioning from Division II of the NAIA after the end of the 1981 season.

=== Conference changes ===
- Catholic University joined the ODAC this year, but was not eligible for the conference title until 1983.
- Westfield State, which began in 1980 as a club team, went varsity this year, joining the NEFC.
- Boston State dropped their football program when they merged with UMass Boston in 1982.
- Carleton played their final season in the Midwest Conference this year, as they joined the Minnesota Intercollegiate Athletic Conference in 1983.

School	1981 conference	1982 conference
Boston State	NEFC	Dropped Program
Catholic University	Independent (D-III)	ODAC
Trinity (TX)	TIAA (NAIA)	Independent (D-III)
UCF	Independent (D-III)	Independent (D-II)
Westfield State	Club program	NEFC

== Conference standings ==
1982 College Athletic Conference football standings
	Conf.					Overall
Team	W		L		T	W		L		T
Sewanee $	4	–	1	–	0	7	–	2	–	0
Centre	3	–	2	–	0	5	–	4	–	0
Southwestern (TN)	3	–	2	–	0	5	–	4	–	0
Principia	2	–	3	–	0	5	–	4	–	0
Rose–Hulman	2	–	3	–	0	4	–	6	–	0
Illinois College	1	–	4	–	0	3	–	6	–	0
$ – Conference champion

1982 College Conference of Illinois and Wisconsin football standings
	Conf.					Overall
Team	W		L		T	W		L		T
Augustana (IL) $^	8	–	0	–	0	11	–	1	–	0
North Central (IL)	6	–	1	–	1	7	–	1	–	1
Millikin	5	–	2	–	1	5	–	3	–	1
Elmhurst	5	–	3	–	0	6	–	3	–	0
Carthage	4	–	4	–	0	4	–	5	–	0
Illinois Wesleyan	4	–	4	–	0	4	–	5	–	0
Wheaton (IL)	2	–	6	–	0	2	–	7	–	0
North Park	1	–	7	–	0	1	–	8	–	0
Carroll (WI)	0	–	8	–	0	0	–	9	–	0
$ – Conference champion; ^ – NCAA Division III playoff participant

1982 Independent College Athletic Conference football standings
	Conf.					Overall
Team	W		L		T	W		L		T
St. Lawrence $^	4	–	0	–	0	10	–	1	–	0
Alfred	2	–	1	–	0	6	–	4	–	0
Ithaca	1	–	2	–	0	6	–	4	–	0
Hobart	1	–	3	–	0	4	–	5	–	0
RPI	0	–	2	–	0	4	–	4	–	1
$ – Conference champion; ^ – NCAA Division III playoff participant

1982 Iowa Conference football standings
	Conf.					Overall
Team	W		L		T	W		L		T
Wartburg $^	7	–	0	–	0	8	–	2	–	0
Central (IA)	6	–	1	–	0	8	–	2	–	0
Luther	5	–	2	–	0	6	–	3	–	0
Dubuque	4	–	3	–	0	6	–	3	–	0
Buena Vista	3	–	4	–	0	4	–	5	–	0
Simpson (IA)	2	–	5	–	0	4	–	5	–	0
Upper Iowa	1	–	6	–	0	2	–	8	–	0
William Penn	0	–	7	–	0	1	–	9	–	0
$ – Conference champion; ^ – NCAA Division III playoff participant

1982 Metropolitan Intercollegiate Conference football standings
	Conf.					Overall
Team	W		L		T	W		L		T
St. John's $	4	–	0	–	0	9	–	1	–	0
Pace	3	–	1	–	0	5	–	4	–	0
Marist	2	–	2	–	0	2	–	7	–	0
Brooklyn	1	–	3	–	0	3	–	7	–	0
Saint Peter's	0	–	4	–	0	1	–	8	–	0
$ – Conference champion

1982 Michigan Intercollegiate Athletic Association football standings
	Conf.					Overall
Team	W		L		T	W		L		T
Hope $	5	–	0	–	0	8	–	1	–	0
Adrian	3	–	2	–	0	7	–	2	–	0
Kalamazoo	2	–	2	–	1	5	–	2	–	1
Albion	2	–	2	–	1	3	–	5	–	1
Alma	1	–	4	–	0	3	–	6	–	0
Olivet	1	–	4	–	0	1	–	8	–	0
$ – Conference champion

1982 Middle Atlantic Conference football standings
	Conf.					Overall
Team	W		L		T	W		L		T
Northern Division
Delaware Valley x	6	–	1	–	0	8	–	2	–	0
Lycoming x	6	–	1	–	0	8	–	2	–	0
Susquehanna	5	–	2	–	0	7	–	3	–	0
Juniata	4	–	3	–	0	6	–	4	–	0
Upsala	4	–	3	–	0	5	–	5	–	0
Albright	2	–	5	–	0	3	–	6	–	0
Wilkes	1	–	6	–	0	1	–	8	–	0
Fairleigh Dickinson–Florham	0	–	7	–	0	1	–	8	–	0
Southern Division
Widener x^	7	–	1	–	0	9	–	2	–	0
Swarthmore x	7	–	1	–	0	8	–	1	–	0
Franklin & Marshall	6	–	2	–	0	7	–	2	–	0
Gettysburg	6	–	2	–	0	7	–	3	–	0
Muhlenberg	4	–	4	–	0	4	–	5	–	0
Ursinus	3	–	4	–	1	3	–	5	–	1
Moravian	3	–	5	–	0	3	–	6	–	0
Western Maryland	2	–	5	–	1	2	–	6	–	1
Johns Hopkins	2	–	6	–	0	3	–	6	–	0
Lebanon Valley	2	–	6	–	0	2	–	7	–	0
Dickinson	1	–	7	–	0	1	–	8	–	0
x – Division champion/co-champions; ^ – NCAA Division III playoff participant

1982 Midwest Conference football standings
	Conf.					Overall
Team	W		L		T	W		L		T
North Division
Ripon xy$	4	–	0	–	0	8	–	2	–	0
Lawrence	3	–	1	–	0	6	–	2	–	0
Beloit	2	–	2	–	0	5	–	4	–	0
Lake Forest	1	–	3	–	0	4	–	4	–	0
Chicago	0	–	4	–	0	0	–	9	–	0
South Division
Cornell (IA) xy	5	–	0	–	0	7	–	3	–	0
Carleton	4	–	1	–	0	6	–	2	–	0
Coe	3	–	2	–	0	4	–	5	–	0
Monmouth (IL)	2	–	3	–	0	3	–	6	–	0
Knox	1	–	4	–	0	2	–	6	–	0
Grinnell	0	–	5	–	0	1	–	8	–	0
Championship: Ripon 16, Cornell 10
$ – Conference champion; x – Division champion/co-champions; y – Championship game participant

1982 Minnesota Intercollegiate Athletic Conference football standings
	Conf.					Overall
Team	W		L		T	W		L		T
No. 3 Saint John's (MN) $^	8	–	0	–	0	9	–	1	–	0
No. 12 St. Thomas (MN)	6	–	2	–	0	8	–	2	–	0
Gustavus Adolphus	6	–	2	–	0	6	–	4	–	0
Concordia–Moorhead	5	–	3	–	0	6	–	4	–	0
Hamline #	5	–	3	–	0	6	–	4	–	0
Augsburg	2	–	5	–	1	2	–	7	–	1
Bethel (MN)	1	–	6	–	1	1	–	8	–	1
Macalester	1	–	7	–	0	2	–	8	–	0
St. Olaf	1	–	7	–	0	2	–	8	–	0
Carleton *	0	–	0	–	0	6	–	2	–	0
$ – Conference champion; ^ – NAIA Division II playoff participant # – Hamline initially forfeited 5 conference wins—over Augsburg, St. Olaf, Macalester, Concordia–Moorhead, and Bethel (MN)—because a player was ruled ineligible under NAIA rules, but the player was later ruled eligible under MIAC code, and the wins were restored to Hamline. * – ineligible for conference title; Rankings from NAIA Division II poll

1982 New England Football Conference standings
	Conf.					Overall
Team	W		L		T	W		L		T
Plymouth State $	9	–	0	–	0	10	–	0	–	0
Massachusetts Maritime	7	–	2	–	0	7	–	2	–	0
Maine Maritime	6	–	2	–	1	7	–	2	–	1
Bridgewater State	5	–	3	–	1	5	–	3	–	1
Nichols	5	–	4	–	0	5	–	4	–	0
Western New England	4	–	5	–	0	4	–	5	–	0
Framingham State	3	–	6	–	0	3	–	6	–	0
Western Connecticut State	2	–	7	–	0	2	–	7	–	0
Westfield State	2	–	7	–	0	2	–	7	–	0
Curry	1	–	8	–	0	1	–	8	–	0
$ – Conference champion

1982 New England Small College Athletic Conference football standings
	Conf.					Overall
Team	W		L		T	W		L		T
Amherst	7	–	1	–	0	7	–	1	–	0
Tufts	6	–	2	–	0	6	–	2	–	0
Trinity (CT)	4	–	2	–	0	5	–	3	–	0
Middlebury	4	–	2	–	0	4	–	4	–	0
Williams	3	–	3	–	0	4	–	4	–	0
Bowdoin	3	–	4	–	0	4	–	4	–	0
Bates	3	–	4	–	0	4	–	4	–	0
Wesleyan	2	–	5	–	0	3	–	5	–	0
Colby	1	–	5	–	0	1	–	7	–	0
Hamilton	0	–	5	–	0	1	–	7	–	0
The NESCAC did not recognize an official conference champion until 2000

1982 New Jersey State Athletic Conference football standings
	Conf.					Overall
Team	W		L		T	W		L		T
Montclair State $	6	–	0	–	0	8	–	0	–	2
Trenton State	5	–	1	–	0	9	–	1	–	0
Ramapo	3	–	3	–	0	7	–	3	–	0
Glassboro State	3	–	3	–	0	5	–	5	–	0
William Paterson	3	–	3	–	0	5	–	5	–	0
Kean	1	–	5	–	0	2	–	9	–	0
Jersey City State	0	–	6	–	0	1	–	9	–	0
$ – Conference champion

1982 Northern Intercollegiate Conference football standings
	Conf.					Overall
Team	W		L		T	W		L		T
No. 6 Moorhead State $^	5	–	0	–	1	7	–	2	–	1
Minnesota Duluth	5	–	1	–	0	7	–	2	–	0
Minnesota Morris	3	–	2	–	1	4	–	4	–	2
Northern State	2	–	4	–	0	3	–	6	–	0
Southwest State (MN)	2	–	4	–	0	2	–	7	–	0
Bemidji State	2	–	4	–	0	2	–	8	–	0
Winona State	1	–	5	–	0	3	–	6	–	0
$ – Conference champion; ^ – NAIA Division I playoff participant; Rankings from NAIA Division I poll

1982 Ohio Athletic Conference football standings
	Conf.					Overall
Team	W		L		T	W		L		T
Blue Division
Ohio Northern xy	4	–	0	–	1	6	–	3	–	1
Wittenberg	4	–	1	–	0	7	–	2	–	0
Otterbein	3	–	2	–	0	5	–	4	–	0
Ohio Wesleyan	2	–	3	–	0	4	–	5	–	0
Denison	1	–	3	–	1	2	–	5	–	2
Marietta	0	–	5	–	0	0	–	9	–	0
Red Division
Baldwin–Wallace xy$^	5	–	0	–	0	10	–	1	–	0
Mount Union	4	–	1	–	0	8	–	1	–	0
Capital	3	–	2	–	0	5	–	4	–	0
Heidelberg	2	–	3	–	0	5	–	4	–	0
Wooster	1	–	4	–	0	1	–	8	–	0
Muskingum	0	–	5	–	0	2	–	7	–	0
Not competing for championship
Kenyon			–			4	–	4	–	0
Oberlin			–			2	–	7	–	0
Championship: Baldwin–Wallace 24, Ohio Northern 0
$ – Conference champion; x – Division champion/co-champions; y – Championship game participant; ^ – NCAA Division III playoff participant

1982 Old Dominion Athletic Conference football standings
	Conf.					Overall
Team	W		L		T	W		L		T
Hampden–Sydney $	4	–	1	–	0	4	–	4	–	1
Randolph–Macon	3	–	2	–	0	6	–	4	–	0
Washington and Lee	3	–	2	–	0	5	–	4	–	0
Bridgewater	2	–	3	–	0	3	–	6	–	0
Emory & Henry	2	–	3	–	0	3	–	6	–	0
Maryville (TN)	1	–	4	–	0	2	–	8	–	0
Catholic University *			–			5	–	4	–	0
$ – Conference champion; * – Ineligible for conference title

1982 Presidents' Athletic Conference football standings
	Conf.					Overall
Team	W		L		T	W		L		T
Hiram $	6	–	1	–	0	6	–	3	–	0
Case Western Reserve	5	–	2	–	0	5	–	3	–	0
Carnegie Mellon	4	–	3	–	0	6	–	3	–	0
John Carroll	4	–	3	–	0	5	–	4	–	0
Bethany (WV)	3	–	4	–	0	4	–	5	–	0
Washington & Jefferson	3	–	4	–	0	4	–	5	–	0
Allegheny	3	–	4	–	0	3	–	5	–	0
Thiel	0	–	7	–	0	0	–	9	–	0
$ – Conference champion

1982 Southern California Intercollegiate Athletic Conference football standings
	Conf.					Overall
Team	W		L		T	W		L		T
La Verne +	4	–	1	–	0	8	–	1	–	0
Whittier +	4	–	1	–	0	6	–	3	–	0
Occidental	3	–	2	–	0	4	–	5	–	0
Redlands	3	–	2	–	0	4	–	6	–	0
Claremont–Mudd	1	–	4	–	0	1	–	8	–	0
Pomona–Pitzer	0	–	5	–	0	1	–	7	–	0
+ – Conference co-champions

1982 Southern Intercollegiate Athletic Conference football standings
	Conf.					Overall
Team	W		L		T	W		L		T
Division II
No. 7 Fort Valley State x^	6	–	0	–	0	10	–	2	–	0
Alabama A&M	4	–	2	–	0	6	–	4	–	1
Morris Brown	4	–	2	–	0	7	–	4	–	0
Tuskegee	5	–	3	–	0	6	–	4	–	0
Morehouse	5	–	4	–	0	5	–	5	–	0
Savannah State	3	–	4	–	0	4	–	6	–	0
Clark	1	–	6	–	0	1	–	8	–	0
Albany State	1	–	5	–	0	1	–	9	–	0
Division III
Lane x	3	–	0	–	0	6	–	2	–	1
Knoxville	3	–	2	–	0	4	–	5	–	0
Fisk	0	–	4	–	0	1	–	7	–	0
Miles	1	–	5	–	0	1	–	9	–	0
x – Division champion/co-champions; ^ – NCAA Division II playoff participant; Rankings from 1982 NCAA Division II football rankings

1982 Wisconsin State University Conference football standings
	Conf.					Overall
Team	W		L		T	W		L		T
No. 11 Wisconsin–La Crosse $	7	–	1	–	0	8	–	2	–	0
Wisconsin–River Falls	6	–	2	–	0	7	–	2	–	1
Wisconsin–Eau Claire	6	–	2	–	0	6	–	4	–	0
Wisconsin–Stout	5	–	3	–	0	8	–	3	–	0
Wisconsin–Whitewater	4	–	4	–	0	7	–	4	–	0
Wisconsin–Platteville	3	–	5	–	0	5	–	5	–	0
Wisconsin–Stevens Point	3	–	5	–	0	3	–	7	–	0
Wisconsin–Oshkosh	1	–	7	–	0	3	–	7	–	0
Wisconsin–Superior	1	–	7	–	0	2	–	9	–	0
$ – Conference champion; Wisconsin–Stevens Point forfeited 3 games.; Rankings from NAIA Division I poll

1982 NCAA Division III independents football records
	Conf.			Overall
Team	W	L	T	W		L		T
West Georgia ^		–		12	–	0	–	0
Wabash		–		10	–	0	–	0
Union (NY)		–		8	–	1	–	0
Wagner ^		–		8	–	1	–	1
DePauw		–		8	–	2	–	0
Bishop ^		–		8	–	4	–	0
Frostburg State		–		6	–	2	–	2
Albany		–		6	–	3	–	0
Canisius		–		6	–	3	–	0
Duquesne		–		6	–	3	–	0
Millsaps		–		6	–	3	–	0
WPI		–		5	–	3	–	0
Iona		–		5	–	3	–	1
Dayton		–		6	–	4	–	0
Hofstra		–		6	–	4	–	0
Norwich		–		6	–	4	–	0
Colorado College		–		5	–	4	–	0
Salisbury State		–		5	–	4	–	0
Buffalo		–		5	–	5	–	0
Mercyhurst		–		4	–	5	–	0
San Diego		–		4	–	5	–	0
Buffalo State		–		4	–	6	–	0
Cortland		–		4	–	6	–	0
Georgetown		–		3	–	5	–	0
Illinois College		–		3	–	6	–	0
St. Norbert		–		3	–	7	–	0
Grove City		–		2	–	7	–	0
Merchant Marine		–		2	–	7	–	0
Washington (MO)		–		2	–	7	–	0
Fordham		–		2	–	8	–	0
Rochester (NY)		–		2	–	8	–	0
Lowell		–		2	–	8	–	0
Brockport		–		1	–	8	–	0
Saint Francis (PA)		–		0	–	8	–	1
^ – NCAA Division III playoff participant

== Conference champions ==
Conference champions
- College Athletic Conference – Sewanee
- College Conference of Illinois and Wisconsin – Augustana (IL)
- Independent College Athletic Conference – St. Lawrence
- Iowa Intercollegiate Athletic Conference – Wartburg
- Michigan Intercollegiate Athletic Association – Hope
- Middle Atlantic Conference – Delaware Valley and Lycoming (North), Widener (South)
- Midwest Collegiate Athletic Conference – Ripon
- Minnesota Intercollegiate Athletic Conference – Saint John's (MN)
- New England Football Conference – Plymouth State
- New Jersey State Athletic Conference – Montclair State
- Northwest Conference – Linfield
- Ohio Athletic Conference – Baldwin Wallace (Red Division), Ohio Northern (Blue Division)
- Old Dominion Athletic Conference – Hampden–Sydney
- Presidents' Athletic Conference – Hiram
- Southern California Intercollegiate Athletic Conference – La Verne
- Texas Intercollegiate Athletic Association – Sul Ross
- Twin Rivers Conference – Concordia–St. Paul, Mount Senario, and Northwestern–St. Paul
- Wisconsin Intercollegiate Athletic Conference – Wisconsin–La Crosse

== Postseason ==
The 1982 NCAA Division III Football Championship playoffs were the tenth annual single-elimination tournament to determine the national champion of men's NCAA Division III college football. The championship Stagg Bowl game was held at Garrett-Harrison Stadium in Phenix City, Alabama for the tenth consecutive year. Like the previous seven championships, eight teams competed in this edition.

=== Playoff bracket ===
Quarterfinals; Campus Sites
Augustana (IL)	28
Baldwin Wallace	22
St. Lawrence	43
Wagner	34
Bishop	32
Wartburg	7
West Georgia (3OT)	31
Widener	24

Semifinals; Campus Sites
Augustana (IL)	14
St. Lawrence	0
Bishop	6
West Georgia	27

National Championship Game; Garrett-Harrison Stadium; Phenix City, AL
Augustana (IL)	0
West Georgia	14

== See also ==
- 1982 NCAA Division I-A football season
- 1982 NCAA Division I-AA football season
- 1982 NCAA Division II football season
