= List of UC Davis Aggies in the NFL draft =

This is a list of UC Davis Aggies football players in the NFL draft.

== Key ==
B	Back	K	Kicker	NT	Nose tackle
C	Center	LB	Linebacker	FB	Fullback
DB	Defensive back	P	Punter	HB	Halfback
DE	Defensive end	QB	Quarterback	WR	Wide receiver
DT	Defensive tackle	RB	Running back	G	Guard
E	End	T	Offensive tackle	TE	Tight end

= Pro Bowler
= Hall of Famer

== Selections ==
Year	Round	Pick	Overall	Player	Team	Position
1970	2	16	42	Tom Williams	San Diego Chargers	DT
1970	12	16	302	Howard Gravelle	San Diego Chargers	TE
1970	12	24	310	Gary DeLoach	Oakland Raiders	G
1976	17	11	470	Anthony Terry	Philadelphia Eagles	DB
1977	7	21	188	Rich Martini	Oakland Raiders	WR
1977	12	27	334	Rolf Benirschke	Oakland Raiders	K
1979	5	3	113	Casey Merrill	Cincinnati Bengals	DE
1979	6	17	154	Mike Moroski	Atlanta Falcons	QB
1980	8	17	212	Jeff Allen	Miami Dolphins	DB
1983	1	24	24	Ken O'Brien	New York Jets	QB
1984	2	26	54	Bo Eason	Houston Oilers	S
1985	6	28	168	Scott Barry	San Francisco 49ers	QB
1986	4	3	85	Mike Wise	Los Angeles Raiders	DE
1991	12	3	309	Jeff Bridewell	Phoenix Cardinals	QB
1999	5	18	151	Kevin Daft	Tennessee Titans	QB
2001	5	22	151	Onome Ojo	New Orleans Saints	WR
2002	6	14	186	J. T. O'Sullivan	New Orleans Saints	QB
