= List of UC Davis Aggies head football coaches =

List of head football coaches for the UC Davis Aggies

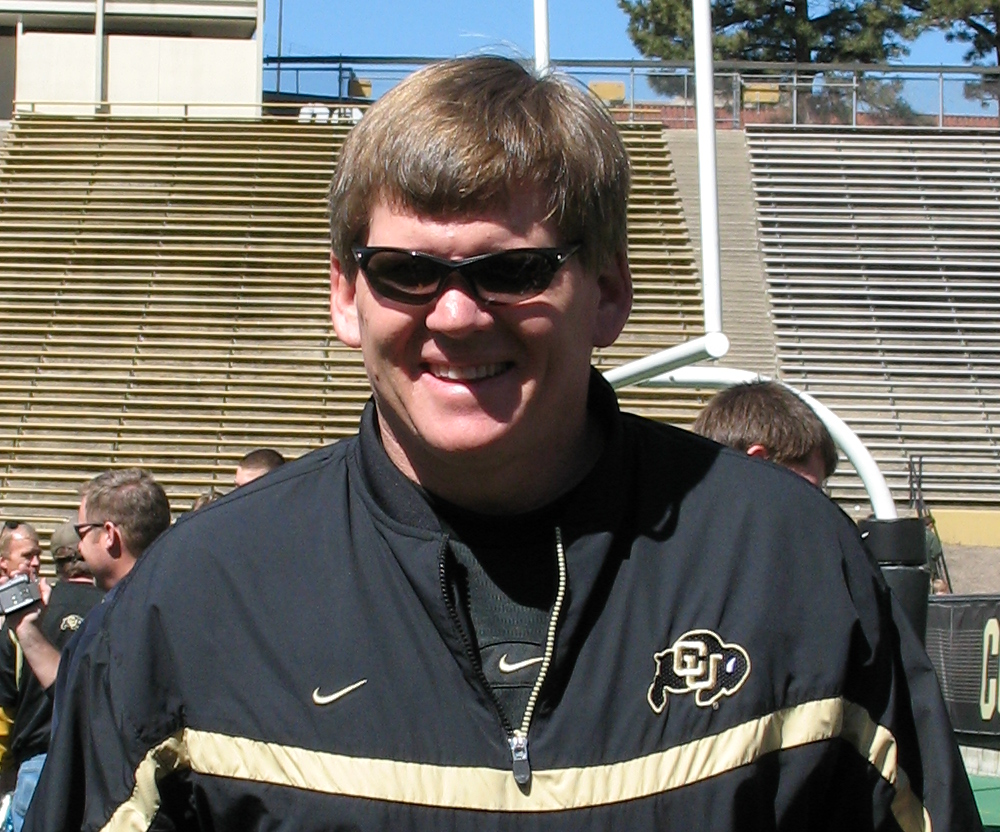
Dan Hawkins served as head coach of the Aggies from 2017–2023.

The UC Davis Aggies college football team represents the University of California, Davis in the Big Sky Conference (Big Sky), as part of the NCAA Division I Football Bowl Subdivision. The program has had 18 head coaches since it began play during the 1915 season. Since November 2023, Tim Plough has served as UC Davis' head coach.

Five coaches have led UC Davis in the postseason: Ted Forbes, Jim Sochor, Bob Foster, Bob Biggs, Dan Hawkins, and Tim Plough. Eight of those coaches also won conference championships: Sochor captured eleven; captured three; Forbes and Will Lotter captured two; and, Crip Toomey and Vern Hickey each captured one as a member of the Far Western Conference. Sochor captured seven and Foster captured three as a member of the Northern California Athletic Conference. Biggs captured one as a member of the American West Conference and two as a member of the Great West Conference. Hawkins captured one as a member of the Big Sky.

Sochor is the leader in seasons coached, with 19 years as head coach and wins with 156. Biggs is the leader in games coached with 230. Sochor has the highest winning percentage at .785. Ron Gould has the lowest winning percentage at .267. Of the 18 different head coaches who have led the Aggies, Sochor has been inducted into the College Football Hall of Fame.

== Key ==
Key to symbols in coaches list
General		Overall		Conference		Postseason (Note: Although the first Rose Bowl Game was played in 1902, it has been continuously played since the 1916 game, and is recognized as the oldest bowl game by the NCAA. "—" indicates any season prior to 1916 when postseason games were not played.)	
No.	Order of coaches (Note: A running total of the number of head coaches, with coaches who served separate tenures being counted only once. Interim head coaches are represented with "Int" and are not counted in the running total. "—" indicates the team played but either without a coach or no coach is on record. "X" indicates an interim year without play.)	GC	Games coached	CW	Conference wins	PW	Postseason wins
DC	Division championships	OW	Overall wins	CL	Conference losses	PL	Postseason losses
CC	Conference championships	OL	Overall losses	CT	Conference ties	PT	Postseason ties
NC	National championships	OT	Overall ties (Note: Overtime rules in college football were introduced in 1996, making ties impossible in the period since.)	C%	Conference winning percentage		
†	Elected to the College Football Hall of Fame	O%	Overall winning percentage (Note: When computing the win–loss percentage, a tie counts as half a win and half a loss.)				

== Coaches ==
List of head football coaches showing season(s) coached, overall records, conference records (Note: UC Davis has been a member of Big Sky Conference since the 2012 season.), postseason records, championships and selected awards (Note: Statistics correct as of the end of the 2025 NCAA Division I FCS football season.)
No.	Name	Season(s)	GC	OW	OL	OT	O%	CW	CL	CT	C%	PW	PL	PT	CCs	NCs	Awards
1	Robert E. Harmon	1915–1916	13	10	3	0	0.769	—	—	—	—	—	—	—	—	0	—
2	Jack Glascock	1917	3	1	2	0	0.333	—	—	—	—	—	—	—	—	0	—
3	William E. Bobbitt	1919	7	2	5	0	0.286	—	—	—	—	—	—	—	—	0	—
4	Eugene Van Gent	1920	8	3	4	1	0.438	—	—	—	—	—	—	—	—	0	—
5	Wilmer D. Elfrink	1921	7	3	4	0	0.429	—	—	—	—	—	—	—	—	0	—
6	Chester Brewer	1922	9	3	4	2	0.444	—	—	—	—	—	—	—	—	0	—
7	William L. Driver	1923–1927	44	18	23	3	0.443	4	7	0	0.364	—	—	—	0	0	—
8	Crip Toomey	1928–1936	74	24	42	8	0.378	14	20	5	0.423	—	—	—	1	0	—
9	Vern Hickey	1937–1942; 1946–1948	73	23	42	8	0.370	10	16	2	0.393	—	—	—	1	0	—
10	Ted Forbes	1949–1953; 1955	52	21	29	2	0.423	16	6	2	0.708	0	2	0	1	0	—
11	Will Lotter	1954; 1956–1957; 1959–1963	71	26	42	3	0.387	10	16	2	0.393	0	0	0	2	0	—
12	Herb Schmalenberger	1958; 1964–1969	66	28	38	0	0.424	16	22	0	0.421	0	0	0	0	0	—
13	Jim Sochor^{†}	1970–1988	202	156	41	5	0.785	92	5	0	0.948	4	9	0	18	0	—
14	Bob Foster	1989–1992	42	30	11	1	0.726	16	6	2	0.708	0	2	0	3	0	—
15	Bob Biggs	1993–2012	230	144	85	1	0.628	25	21	0	0.543	11	8	0	3	0	—
16	Ron Gould	2013–2016	45	12	33	—	0.267	10	22	—	0.313	0	0	—	0	0	—
17	Dan Hawkins	2017–2023	75	44	31	—	0.587	31	22	—	0.585	1	2	—	1	0	—
18	Tim Plough	2024–present	27	20	7	—	0.741	13	3	—	0.813	2	2	—	0	0	—
