= Chris Carter (wide receiver) =

American football player (born 1987)

No. 5
- Position: Wide receiver

Personal information
- Born: June 14, 1987 (age 39); Mission Viejo, California, U.S.
- Listed height: 6 ft 0 in (1.83 m)
- Listed weight: 195 lb (88 kg)

Career information
- High school: San Ramon Valley (Danville, California)
- College: UC Davis
- NFL draft: 2010: undrafted

Career history
- Seattle Seahawks (2011)*; Arizona Rattlers (2012)
- * Offseason or practice squad member only

Awards and highlights
- ArenaBowl champion (2012); Great West Offensive Player of the Year (2009); Great West Rookie of the Year (2006); 2× First-team All-Great West (2008–2009); Second-team All-Great West (2006)

Career AFL statistics
- Receptions: 5
- Receiving yards: 77
- Receiving TDs: 1
- Stats at ArenaFan.com

Chris Carter (born June 14, 1987) is an American former football wide receiver. He played college football at UC Davis, where he was the 2009 Great West Offensive Player of the Year and earned all-conference honors three times. He set school records for most receptions in both a game (18) and a career (213). He played high school football at San Ramon Valley Wolves and won North Coast Section Offensive Player of the Year in his senior year and helped lead the team to a championship.

Undrafted in the 2010 NFL draft, Carter played with the Seattle Seahawks in the 2011 preseason before being waived.

== High school ==
In his senior year, Carter helped lead the San Ramon Valley Wolves to an 11–2 record and their first North Coast Section championship. In the 46–20 victory in the championship game, he caught eight passes for 144 yards and two touchdowns, rushed five times for 88 yards and a touchdown, caught two 2-point conversions, and intercepted a pass. He was voted most valuable player of the game. For the season, he was named the North Coast Section Offensive Player of the Year after catching 63 passes totaling 1,515 yards (24.0 avg.) for 19 TDs. He was also selected to the All-Metro and All-San Francisco Chronicle first-teams.

== College career ==
Carter started out his collegiate career at UC Davis as the Great West Rookie of the Year in 2006 after catching 54 passes for 703 yards and five touchdowns, earning him second-team All-Great West Conference honors. After starting the first two games of the season, he lost the remainder of his sophomore year after tearing the posterior cruciate ligament (PCL) in his left knee. In 2008, he recovered and was named All-Great West Conference First-team after a team-best 69 receptions with 768 and 5 touchdowns.

In his senior year, Carter set the school record for most receptions in a game (18) against Montana in September. However, Carter discovered four games into the season that he had torn cartilage in his left knee attributed to his body compensating for his 2007 PCL injury. Although unable to practice most of the year, he continued to play with the injury. Carter had nine catches for 96 yards and two touchdowns to help UC Davis win the Great West title in a 28-20 victory against North Dakota. For the season, Carter recorded 85 receptions—the second highest total in school history—for 889 yards and four touchdowns. He was named the 2009 Great West Offensive Player of the Year. Carter finished his career as the Aggies career reception leader (213). "Chris Carter, as I've been quoted, I think he may be the finest wide receiver that's played here," said UC Davis coach Bob Biggs.

== Professional career ==
Due to his injury, Carter was unable to participate in the NFL Scouting Combine or any other workouts. He was on crutches for two months, and required six months for his knee to recover. Carter went undrafted in the 2010 NFL draft after being considered a probable late-round pick.

He was signed by the Seattle Seahawks to a futures contract in January 2011 after drawing their attention during a tryout. However, the NFL lockout cost him the opportunity to establish himself during mini-camps and organized team workouts. He was waived on August 29, re-signed on August 31 but released again on September 3 during the Seahawks' final roster cuts before the 2011 regular season.

Carter was signed by the Arizona Rattlers of the Arena Football League on October 4, 2011.
