= 1987 Sonoma State Cossacks football team =

American college football season

1987 Sonoma State Cossacks football
- Conference: Northern California Athletic Conference
- Record: 5–6 (2–3 NCAC)
- Head coach: Marty Fine (1st season)
- Home stadium: Cossacks Stadium

1987 Northern California Athletic Conference football standings
| | Conf. | | | | | Overall |
| Team | W | | L | | T | W | | L | | T |
|---|---|---|---|---|---|---|---|---|---|---|
| No. 10 UC Davis $ | 5 | – | 0 | – | 0 | 8 | – | 2 | – | 0 |
| Chico State | 3 | – | 2 | – | 0 | 3 | – | 6 | – | 0 |
| Humboldt State | 2 | – | 2 | – | 1 | 3 | – | 7 | – | 1 |
| Sonoma State | 2 | – | 3 | – | 0 | 5 | – | 6 | – | 0 |
| Cal State Hayward | 2 | – | 3 | – | 0 | 2 | – | 8 | – | 0 |
| San Francisco State | 0 | – | 4 | – | 1 | 1 | – | 8 | – | 1 |
$ – Conference champion; Rankings from NCAA Division II Football Committee poll

The 1987 Sonoma State Cossacks football team represented Sonoma State University as a member of the Northern California Athletic Conference (NCAC) during the 1987 NCAA Division II football season. Led by first-year head coach Marty Fine, Sonoma State compiled an overall record of 5–6 with a mark of 2–3 in conference play, tying for fourth place in the NCAC. The team was outscored by its opponents 257 to 184 for the season. The Cossacks played home games at Cossacks Stadium (Note: Cossacks Stadium was renamed in 2002 to Seawolf Stadium when the University changed the name of the mascot to Seawolves.) in Rohnert Park, California.

== Schedule ==
| Date | Opponent | Site | Result | Attendance | Source |
|---|---|---|---|---|---|
| September 12 | Carroll (MT)* | Cossacks Stadium; Rohnert Park, CA | W 35–26 | 1,481 | |
| September 19 | Saint Mary's*^{†} | Cossacks Stadium; Rohnert Park, CA | W 39–18 | 1,693 | |
| September 26 | at Cal State Northridge* | North Campus Stadium; Northridge, CA | L 6–13 | 3,426 | |
| October 3 | at Northern Arizona* | Walkup Skydome; Flagstaff, AZ | L 6–55 | 12,765 | |
| October 10 | at San Francisco State | Cox Stadium; San Francisco, CA | W 14–7 | 500 | |
| October 17 | at Cal State Hayward | Pioneer Stadium; Hayward, CA | W 24–6 | 700–726 | |
| October 24 | Menlo* | Cossacks Stadium; Rohnert Park, CA | W 19–14 | 842 | |
| October 31 | UC Davis | Cossacks Stadium; Rohnert Park, CA | L 14–25 | 2,681 | |
| November 7 | at Humboldt State | Redwood Bowl; Arcata, CA | L 7–49 | 3,150 | |
| November 14 | UC Santa Barbara* | Cossacks Stadium; Rohnert Park, CA | L 12–22 | 572 | |
| November 21 | Chico State | Cossacks Stadium; Rohnert Park, CA | L 18–22 | 681 | |
*Non-conference game; ^{†}Homecoming
