= Jim Sochor =

American football player, coach, and administrator (1938–2015)

Biographical details
- Born: February 11, 1938; Oklahoma City, Oklahoma, U.S.
- Died: November 23, 2015 (aged 77); Sacramento, California, U.S.

Playing career
- 1957–1959: San Francisco State
- Position: Quarterback

Coaching career (HC unless noted)
- 1960–1965: San Francisco State (assistant)
- 1967–1969: UC Davis (assistant)
- 1970–1988: UC Davis
- 1996–1998: Scottish Claymores (OC)

Administrative career (AD unless noted)
- 1989–1991: UC Davis

Head coaching record
- Overall: 156–41–5
- Bowls: 0–1
- Tournaments: 4–8 (NCAA D-II playoffs)

Accomplishments and honors

Championships
- 18× Far Western / NCAC (1971–1988)

Awards
- As a player: Second-team Little All-American (1959)
- College Football Hall of Fame; Inducted in 1999 (profile)

Jim Sochor (February 11, 1938 – November 23, 2015) was an American football player, coach, and college athletics administrator. He served as the head football coach at the University of California, Davis from 1970 to 1988 during which time compiling a record of 156–41–5 and won 18 consecutive conference championships, then a college football record. Sochor also served as the athletic director at UC Davis from 1989 to 1991. He was inducted into the College Football Hall of Fame as a coach in 1999.

== Early years and playing career ==
Sochor was born February 11, 1938, in Oklahoma City, Oklahoma. He grew up in San Francisco, California. Sochor played football as a quarterback at George Washington High School in San Francisco. He also played on the basketball team. He went on to play quarterback at San Francisco State University from 1957 to 1959, leading the San Francisco State Gators to three Far Western Conference (FWC) championships.

== Early coaching career ==
Sochor started his coaching career as an assistant at San Francisco State from 1960 to 1965. He then served as an assistant at the University of California, Davis from 1967 to 1969.

== Head coach ==
Sochor became the head coach at UC Davis in 1970. Following his first year there, he had a streak of 18 consecutive conference championships, from 1971 to 1988 (15 outright, three shared). The only other college football program in NCAA history on any division level for this remarkable streak has been Mount Union College. His overall record between 1970 and 1988 was 156–41–5, a winning percentage of .785. In conference games under Sochor, the Aggies were 92–5. He had winning streaks of 41 and 38 in conference games. His Aggies were the final poll leaders at the end of the regular season in 1983 and 1985.

He was named national coach of the year in NCAA Division II in 1983. He was the coach of future NFL quarterbacks Mike Moroski and Ken O'Brien and kicker Rolf Benirschke. He was also a mentor to several future head coaches including Dan Hawkins, Paul Hackett, Mike Bellotti, Chris Petersen, Gary Patterson, and Bob Biggs.

=== 1982 Palm Bowl ===
Sochor led the 1982 Aggies to the Palm Bowl in McAllen, Texas for the NCAA Division II national football championship against the Jim Wacker-led Southwest Texas State, but lost 34–9. Aggie Quarterback Ken O'Brien had suffered leg and ankle injuries in the semifinal game two weeks before, and as a result reserve Scott Barry had to lead the offense.

== Later life and career ==
Sochor served as the UC Davis director of athletics from 1989 to 1991. He served as the coach of the golf team for five years starting in 1992.

Sochor later served as the offensive coordinator of the Scottish Claymores of NFL Europe for three years. They won World Bowl '96, 32–27, over the Frankfurt Galaxy during his time there. In 1984 and 1988 he served as the assistant coach in the East–West Shrine Game.

Sochor died of cancer on November 23, 2015.

== Honors ==
- He was inducted into the Cal Aggie Athletic Hall of Fame in 1995
- He was inducted into the College Football Hall of Fame in 1999.
- He was awarded the Ronald L. Jensen Award for Lifetime Achievement by the Positive Coaching Alliance in 2008.
- The field at Aggie Stadium is named Jim Sochor Field.

== Head coaching record ==
Year	Team	Overall	Conference	Standing	Bowl/playoffs
UC Davis Aggies (Far Western / Northern California Athletic Conference) (1970–1988)
1970	UC Davis	6–4	2–2	T–3rd	
1971	UC Davis	9–1	5–1	T–1st	
1972	UC Davis	6–2–2	5–0	1st	L Boardwalk
1973	UC Davis	7–3	4–1	T–1st	
1974	UC Davis	9–1	5–0	1st	
1975	UC Davis	7–3	5–0	1st	
1976	UC Davis	8–2	5–0	1st	
1977	UC Davis	11–1	5–0	1st	L NCAA Division II Semifinal
1978	UC Davis	8–3	5–0	1st	L NCAA Division II Quarterfinal
1979	UC Davis	6–3–1	5–0	1st	
1980	UC Davis	7–2–1	5–0	1st	
1981	UC Davis	6–4	4–1	T–1st	
1982	UC Davis	12–1	5–0	1st	L NCAA Division II Championship
1983	UC Davis	11–1	6–0	1st	L NCAA Division II Semifinal
1984	UC Davis	9–2	6–0	1st	L NCAA Division II Quarterfinal
1985	UC Davis	9–2	5–0	1st	L NCAA Division II Quarterfinal
1986	UC Davis	10–1	5–0	1st	L NCAA Division II Quarterfinal
1987	UC Davis	8–2	5–0	1st	
1988	UC Davis	7–3–1	5–0	1st	L NCAA Division II First Round
UC Davis:		156–41–5	92–5		
Total:		156–41–5			
National championship Conference title Conference division title or championship game berth
