= 1987 Humboldt State Lumberjacks football team =

American college football season

1987 Humboldt State Lumberjacks football
- Conference: Northern California Athletic Conference
- Record: 3–7–1 (2–2–1 NCAC)
- Head coach: Mike Dolby (2nd season)
- Offensive coordinator: Bart Andrus (2nd season)
- Home stadium: Redwood Bowl

1987 Northern California Athletic Conference football standings
	Conf.					Overall
Team	W		L		T	W		L		T
No. 10 UC Davis $	5	–	0	–	0	8	–	2	–	0
Chico State	3	–	2	–	0	3	–	6	–	0
Humboldt State	2	–	2	–	1	3	–	7	–	1
Sonoma State	2	–	3	–	0	5	–	6	–	0
Cal State Hayward	2	–	3	–	0	2	–	8	–	0
San Francisco State	0	–	4	–	1	1	–	8	–	1
$ – Conference champion; Rankings from NCAA Division II Football Committee poll

The 1987 Humboldt State Lumberjacks football team represented Humboldt State University—now known as California State Polytechnic University, Humboldt—as a member of the Northern California Athletic Conference (NCAC) during the 1987 NCAA Division II football season. Led by second-year head coach Mike Dolby, the Lumberjacks compiled an overall record of 3–7–1 with a mark of 2–2–1 in conference play, placing third in the NCAC. The team was outscored by its opponents 256 to 226 for the season. Humboldt State played home games at the Redwood Bowl in Arcata, California.

== Schedule ==
Date	Opponent	Site	Result	Attendance	Source
September 12	at Cal Poly*	Mustang Stadium; San Luis Obispo, CA	L 24–30	4,401	
September 19	Menlo*	Redwood Bowl; Arcata, CA	L 13–16	3,533	
September 26	Azusa Pacific*	Redwood Bowl; Arcata, CA	W 24–14	2,750–4,113	
October 3	at Portland State*	Civic Stadium; Portland, OR	L 14–50	2,818	
October 10	at Sacramento State*	Hornet Stadium; Sacramento, CA	L 13–21	2,000	
October 17	Saint Mary's*	Redwood Bowl; Arcata, CA	L 28–30	3,750	
October 24	at Chico State	University Stadium; Chico, CA	W 15–13	3,100–3,776	
October 31	at Cal State Hayward	Pioneer Stadium; Hayward, CA	L 20–21	800–2,700	
November 7	Sonoma State	Redwood Bowl; Arcata, CA	W 49–7	3,150	
November 14	San Francisco State	Redwood Bowl; Arcata, CA	T 13–13	3,690	
November 21	at No. 10 UC Davis	Toomey Field; Davis, CA	L 13–41	5,315–5,350	
*Non-conference game; Rankings from NCAA Division II Football Committee Poll released prior to the game
