= 1987 San Francisco State Gators football team =

American college football season

1987 San Francisco State Gators football
- Conference: Northern California Athletic Conference
- Record: 1–8–1 (0–4–1 NCAC)
- Head coach: Vic Rowen (27th season)
- Home stadium: Cox Stadium

1987 Northern California Athletic Conference football standings
	Conf.					Overall
Team	W		L		T	W		L		T
No. 10 UC Davis $	5	–	0	–	0	8	–	2	–	0
Chico State	3	–	2	–	0	3	–	6	–	0
Humboldt State	2	–	2	–	1	3	–	7	–	1
Sonoma State	2	–	3	–	0	5	–	6	–	0
Cal State Hayward	2	–	3	–	0	2	–	8	–	0
San Francisco State	0	–	4	–	1	1	–	8	–	1
$ – Conference champion; Rankings from NCAA Division II Football Committee poll

The 1987 San Francisco State Gators football team represented San Francisco State University as a member of the Northern California Athletic Conference (NCAC) during the 1987 NCAA Division II football season. Led by 27th-year head coach Vic Rowen, San Francisco State compiled an overall record of 1–8–1 with a mark of 0–4–1 in conference play, placing last out of six teams in the NCAC. For the season the team was outscored by its opponents 245 to 97. The Gators played home games at Cox Stadium in San Francisco.

== Schedule ==
Date	Opponent	Site	Result	Attendance	Source
September 12	Cal Lutheran*	Cox Stadium; San Francisco, CA	L 13–23	500	
September 19	at Cal State Northridge*	North Campus Stadium; Northridge, CA	L 0–45	3,564–3,654	
October 3	Saint Mary's*	Cox Stadium; San Francisco CA	L 13–30	800	
October 10	Sonoma State	Cox Stadium; San Francisco, CA	L 7–14	500	
October 17	at UC Davis	Toomey Field; Davis, CA	L 0–31	8,660	
October 24	Santa Clara*	Cox Stadium; San Francisco, CA	L 7–28	1,000	
October 31	at Azusa Pacific*	Cougar Athletic Stadium; Azusa, CA	W 20–7	2,000	
November 7	at Chico State	University Stadium; Chico, CA	L 7–26	1,833–2,500	
November 14	at Humboldt State	Redwood Bowl; Arcata, CA	T 13–13	3,690	
November 21	Cal State Hayward	Cox Stadium; San Francisco, CA	L 17–28	500	
*Non-conference game
