= 1972 UC Davis Aggies football team =

American college football season

1972 UC Davis Aggies football

FWC champion

Boardwalk Bowl, L 14–35 vs. UMass
- Conference: Far Western Conference
- Record: 6–2–2 (5–0 FWC)
- Head coach: Jim Sochor (3rd season)
- Captains: Bruce Groefsema; Dave Roberts; Mike Tenerowitz
- Home stadium: Toomey Field

1972 Far Western Conference football standings
	Conf.					Overall
Team	W		L		T	W		L		T
UC Davis $	5	–	0	–	0	6	–	2	–	2
Humboldt State	4	–	1	–	0	7	–	3	–	0
Chico State	2	–	3	–	0	4	–	5	–	0
Cal State Hayward	2	–	3	–	0	2	–	8	–	0
San Francisco State	1	–	4	–	0	3	–	8	–	0
Sacramento State	1	–	4	–	0	2	–	8	–	0
$ – Conference champion

The 1972 UC Davis Aggies football team represented the University of California, Davis as a member of the Far Western Conference (FWC) during the 1972 NCAA College Division football season. Led by third-year head coach Jim Sochor, UC Davis compiled an overall record of 6–2–2 with a mark of 5–0 in conference play, winning the FWC title for the second consecutive season. 1972 was the third consecutive winning season for the Aggies. UC Davis was invited to play in one of the four NCAA College Division regional finals, the Boardwalk Bowl, in the Atlantic City, New Jersey, where the Aggies lost to UMass. The team outscored its opponents 278 to 228 for the season. The Aggies played home games at Toomey Field in Davis, California.

Bob Biggs was selected by the Associated Press as the first-team quarterback on the 1972 Little All-America college football team.

== Schedule ==
Date	Time	Opponent	Rank	Site	Result	Attendance	Source
September 16		Whittier*		Toomey Field; Davis, CA	T 20–20	5,600	
September 23		at UC Riverside*		Highlander Stadium; Riverside, CA	W 17–10	1,500	
September 30		Santa Clara*		Toomey Field; Davis, CA	T 28–28	7,200	
October 7		at San Francisco State		Cox Stadium; San Francisco, CA	W 47–32	2,500	
October 21		at Chico State		University Stadium; Chico, CA	W 41–17	6,000	
October 28		Cal State Hayward		Toomey Field; Davis, CA	W 27–16	2,157–7,000	
November 4		at Sacramento State		Charles C. Hughes Stadium; Sacramento, CA (rivalry)	W 17–16	6,150–6,500	
November 11		Humboldt State	No. 20	Toomey Field; Davis, CA	W 41–18	9,000	
November 18	1:30 p.m.	at Pacific (CA)*	No. 17	Pacific Memorial Stadium; Stockton, CA	L 26–36	8,261–8,350	
December 9	11:00 a.m.	vs. UMass*		Atlantic City Convention Center; Atlantic City, NJ (Boardwalk Bowl)	L 14–35	2,857	
*Non-conference game; Rankings from UPI Poll released prior to the game; All times are in Pacific time
