= 1987 Sacramento State Hornets football team =

American college football season

1987 Sacramento State Hornets football
- Conference: Western Football Conference
- Record: 4–7 (2–4 WFC)
- Head coach: Bob Mattos (10th season)
- Home stadium: Hornet Stadium

1987 Western Football Conference standings
	Conf.					Overall
Team	W		L		T	W		L		T
No. 3 Portland State $^	6	–	0	–	0	11	–	2	–	1
Cal State Northridge	4	–	2	–	0	7	–	4	–	0
Cal Poly	3	–	3	–	0	7	–	3	–	0
Santa Clara	3	–	3	–	0	6	–	5	–	0
Southern Utah State	2	–	4	–	0	5	–	6	–	0
Sacramento State	2	–	4	–	0	4	–	7	–	0
Cal Lutheran	1	–	5	–	0	5	–	6	–	0
$ – Conference champion; ^ – NCAA Division II playoff participant; Rankings from NCAA Division II Football Committee poll

The 1987 Sacramento State Hornets football team represented California State University, Sacramento as a member of the Western Football Conference (WFC) during the 1987 NCAA Division II football season. Led by tenth-year head coach Bob Mattos, Sacramento State compiled an overall record of 4–7 with a mark of 2–4 in conference play, tying for fifth place in the WFC. The team was outscored by its opponents 192 to 130 for the season. The Hornets played home games at Hornet Stadium in Sacramento, California.

== Schedule ==
Date	Opponent	Site	Result	Attendance
September 12	at Pacific (CA)*	Pacific Memorial Stadium; Stockton, CA	L 7–31	18,025
September 19	Chico State*	Hornet Stadium; Sacramento, CA	W 14–9	5,500
September 26	Mesa State*	Hornet Stadium; Sacramento, CA	L 10–13	2,800
October 3	at Santa Clara	Buck Shaw Stadium; Santa Clara, CA	L 5–10	5,438
October 10	Humboldt State*	Hornet Stadium; Sacramento, CA	W 21–13	2,000
October 17	at No. 5 Portland State	Civic Stadium; Portland, OR	L 0–24	6,023
October 24	No. 8 Cal Poly	Hornet Stadium; Sacramento, CA	W 21–13	4,200
October 31	at Cal Lutheran	Mt. Clef Field; Thousand Oaks, CA	L 7–23	1,108
November 7	Southern Utah State	Hornet Stadium; Sacramento, CA	W 19–7	905–1,100
November 14	No. 14 UC Davis*	Charles C. Hughes Stadium; Sacramento, CA (Causeway Classic)	L 10–28	10,000
November 21	at Cal State Northridge	North Campus Stadium; Northridge, CA	L 16–21	3,927
*Non-conference game; Rankings from NCAA Division II Football Committee Poll released prior to the game
