= 1987 Chico State Wildcats football team =

American college football season

1987 Chico State Wildcats football
- Conference: Northern California Athletic Conference
- Record: 3–6 (3–2 NCAC)
- Head coach: Mike Bellotti (4th season)
- Offensive coordinator: Nick Aliotti (4th season)
- Home stadium: University Stadium

1987 Northern California Athletic Conference football standings
	Conf.					Overall
Team	W		L		T	W		L		T
No. 10 UC Davis $	5	–	0	–	0	8	–	2	–	0
Chico State	3	–	2	–	0	3	–	6	–	0
Humboldt State	2	–	2	–	1	3	–	7	–	1
Sonoma State	2	–	3	–	0	5	–	6	–	0
Cal State Hayward	2	–	3	–	0	2	–	8	–	0
San Francisco State	0	–	4	–	1	1	–	8	–	1
$ – Conference champion; Rankings from NCAA Division II Football Committee poll

The 1987 Chico State Wildcats football team represented California State University, Chico as a member of the Northern California Athletic Conference (NCAC) during the 1987 NCAA Division II football season. Led by fourth-year head coach Mike Bellotti, Chico State compiled an overall record of 3–6 with a mark of 3–2 in conference play, placing second in the NCAC. The team was outscored by its opponents 174 to 155 for the season. The Wildcats played home games at University Stadium in Chico, California.

== Schedule ==
Date	Opponent	Site	Result	Attendance	Source
September 12	at Santa Clara*	Buck Shaw Stadium; Santa Clara, CA	L 17–38	4,256	
September 19	at Sacramento State*	Hornet Stadium; Sacramento, CA	L 9–14	5,500	
September 26	Cal Poly*	University Stadium; Chico, CA	L 17–32	3,500–4,608	
October 10	UC Davis	University Stadium; Chico, CA	L 22–24	6,127–7,800	
October 24	Humboldt State	University Stadium; Chico, CA	L 13–15	3,100–3,776	
October 31	at Saint Mary's*	Saint Mary's Stadium; Moraga, CA	L 16–17	1,025	
November 7	San Francisco State	University Stadium; Chico, CA	W 26–7	1,833–2,500	
November 14	at Cal State Hayward	Pioneer Stadium; Hayward, CA	W 13–9	600–800	
November 21	at Sonoma State	Cossacks Stadium; Rohnert Park, CA	W 22–18	681	
*Non-conference game

== Team players in the NFL ==
The following Chico State players were selected in the 1988 NFL draft.

Player	Position	Round	Overall	NFL team
Chris Verhulst	Tight end	5	130	Houston Oilers
