= 1987 Cal State Hayward Pioneers football team =

American college football season

1987 Cal State Hayward Pioneers football
- Conference: Northern California Athletic Conference
- Record: 2–8 (2–3 NCAC)
- Head coach: Tim Tierney (13th season)
- Home stadium: Pioneer Stadium

1987 Northern California Athletic Conference football standings
	Conf.					Overall
Team	W		L		T	W		L		T
No. 10 UC Davis $	5	–	0	–	0	8	–	2	–	0
Chico State	3	–	2	–	0	3	–	6	–	0
Humboldt State	2	–	2	–	1	3	–	7	–	1
Sonoma State	2	–	3	–	0	5	–	6	–	0
Cal State Hayward	2	–	3	–	0	2	–	8	–	0
San Francisco State	0	–	4	–	1	1	–	8	–	1
$ – Conference champion; Rankings from NCAA Division II Football Committee poll

The 1987 Cal State Hayward Pioneers football team represented California State University, Hayward—now known as California State University, East Bay—as a member of the Northern California Athletic Conference (NCAC) during the 1987 NCAA Division II football season. Led by 13th-year head coach Tim Tierney, Cal State Hayward compiled an overall record of 2–8 with a mark of 2–3 in conference play, tying for fourth place in the NCAC. The team was outscored by its opponents 237 to 146 for the season. The Pioneers played home games at Pioneer Stadium in Hayward, California.

== Schedule ==
Date	Opponent	Site	Result	Attendance	Source
September 12	at Saint Mary's*	Saint Mary's Stadium; Moraga, CA	L 14–16	2,848	
September 19	at Santa Clara*	Buck Shaw Stadium; Santa Clara, CA	L 7–27	8,123	
September 26	at Cal Lutheran*	Mt. Clef Field; Thousand Oaks, CA	L 6–19	1,100–1,782	
October 3	Cal State Northridge*	Pioneer Stadium; Hayward, CA	L 27–38	500	
October 10	No. 13 Cal Poly*	Pioneer Stadium; Hayward, CA	L 14–40	100–1,000	
October 17	Sonoma State	Pioneer Stadium; Hayward, CA	L 6–24	700–726	
October 24	at UC Davis	Toomey Field; Davis, CA	L 14–23	5,200–5,325	
October 31	Humboldt State	Pioneer Stadium; Hayward, CA	W 21–20	800–2,700	
November 14	Chico State	Pioneer Stadium; Hayward, CA	L 9–13	600–800	
November 21	at San Francisco State	Cox Stadium; San Francisco, CA	W 28–17	500	
*Non-conference game; Rankings from NCAA Division II Football Committee Poll released prior to the game
