= 1972 Humboldt State Lumberjacks football team =

American college football season

1972 Humboldt State Lumberjacks football
- Conference: Far Western Conference
- Record: 7–3 (4–1 FWC)
- Head coach: Bud Van Deren (7th season)
- Home stadium: Redwood Bowl

1972 Far Western Conference football standings
	Conf.					Overall
Team	W		L		T	W		L		T
UC Davis $	5	–	0	–	0	6	–	2	–	2
Humboldt State	4	–	1	–	0	7	–	3	–	0
Chico State	2	–	3	–	0	4	–	5	–	0
Cal State Hayward	2	–	3	–	0	2	–	8	–	0
San Francisco State	1	–	4	–	0	3	–	8	–	0
Sacramento State	1	–	4	–	0	2	–	8	–	0
$ – Conference champion

The 1972 Humboldt State Lumberjacks football team represented California State University, Humboldt—now known as California State Polytechnic University, Humboldt—as a member of the Far Western Conference (FWC) during the 1972 NCAA College Division football season. Led by seventh-year head coach Bud Van Deren, the Lumberjacks compiled an overall record of 7–3 with a mark of 4–1 in conference play, placing second in the FWC. The team outscored its opponents 262 to 215 for the season. Humboldt State played home games at the Redwood Bowl in Arcata, California.

== Schedule ==
Date	Opponent	Site	Result	Attendance	Source
September 9	Humboldt State alumni*	Redwood Bowl; Arcata, CA	W 30–7		
September 16	at Puget Sound*	Baker Stadium; Tacoma, WA	W 27–24		
September 23	No. 7 Boise State*	Redwood Bowl; Arcata, CA	L 15–21		
September 30	at Cal Poly*	Mustang Stadium; San Luis Obispo, CA	L 0–34	6,200	
October 7	at Santa Clara*	Buck Shaw Stadium; Santa Clara, CA	W 28–20		
October 14	Chico State	Redwood Bowl; Arcata, CA	W 14–0	2,000	
October 21	Cal State Hayward	Redwood Bowl; Arcata, CA	W 59–33	7,000	
October 28	at Sacramento State	Hornet Stadium; Sacramento, CA	W 20–14	4,100	
November 11	at UC Davis	Toomey Field; Davis, CA	L 18–41	9,000	
November 18	San Francisco State	Redwood Bowl; Arcata, CA	W 51–21	4,000	
*Non-conference game; Rankings from AP Poll released prior to the game
