= 1972 Sacramento State Hornets football team =

American college football season

1972 Sacramento State Hornets football
- Conference: Far Western Conference
- Record: 2–8 (1–4 FWC)
- Head coach: Ray Clemons (12th season)
- Home stadium: Hornet Stadium

1972 Far Western Conference football standings
	Conf.					Overall
Team	W		L		T	W		L		T
UC Davis $	5	–	0	–	0	6	–	2	–	2
Humboldt State	4	–	1	–	0	7	–	3	–	0
Chico State	2	–	3	–	0	4	–	5	–	0
Cal State Hayward	2	–	3	–	0	2	–	8	–	0
San Francisco State	1	–	4	–	0	3	–	8	–	0
Sacramento State	1	–	4	–	0	2	–	8	–	0
$ – Conference champion

The 1972 Sacramento State Hornets football team represented California State University, Sacramento as a member of the Far Western Conference (FWC) during the 1972 NCAA College Division football season. Led by 12th-year head coach Ray Clemons, Sacramento State compiled an overall record of 2–8 with a mark of 1–4 in conference play, tying for fifth place in the FWC. The team was outscored by its opponents 188 to 107 for the season. The Hornets played home games at Hornet Stadium in Sacramento, California.

== Schedule ==
Date	Opponent	Site	Result	Attendance	Source
September 9	at Fresno State*	Ratcliffe Stadium; Fresno, CA	L 7–24	7,012–9,500	
September 16	at Santa Clara*	Buck Shaw Stadium; Santa Clara, CA	L 10–28	6,346	
September 23	Cal Poly Pomona*	Hornet Stadium; Sacramento, CA	L 7–13	4,300	
September 30	Nevada*	Hornet Stadium; Sacramento, CA	W 19–14	2,000–3,800	
October 7	Chico State	Hornet Stadium; Sacramento, CA	L 16–17	3,000–4,100	
October 14	at Cal State Hayward	Pioneer Stadium; Hayward, CA	L 0–21	2,100–6,752	
October 28	Humboldt State	Hornet Stadium; Sacramento, CA	L 14–20	4,100	
November 4	UC Davis	Hornet Stadium; Sacramento, CA (rivalry)	L 16–17	6,150–6,500	
November 11	at San Francisco State	Cox Stadium; San Francisco, CA	W 14–13	1,000	
November 18	at Cal State Fullerton*	Santa Ana Stadium; Santa Ana, CA	L 0–21	1,950–2,600	
*Non-conference game
