= 1987 Santa Clara Broncos football team =

American college football season

1987 Santa Clara Broncos football
- Conference: Western Football Conference
- Record: 6–5 (3–3 WFC)
- Head coach: Terry Malley (3rd season)
- Home stadium: Buck Shaw Stadium

1987 Western Football Conference standings
| | Conf. | | | | | Overall |
| Team | W | | L | | T | W | | L | | T |
|---|---|---|---|---|---|---|---|---|---|---|
| No. 3 Portland State $^ | 6 | – | 0 | – | 0 | 11 | – | 2 | – | 1 |
| Cal State Northridge | 4 | – | 2 | – | 0 | 7 | – | 4 | – | 0 |
| Cal Poly | 3 | – | 3 | – | 0 | 7 | – | 3 | – | 0 |
| Santa Clara | 3 | – | 3 | – | 0 | 6 | – | 5 | – | 0 |
| Southern Utah State | 2 | – | 4 | – | 0 | 5 | – | 6 | – | 0 |
| Sacramento State | 2 | – | 4 | – | 0 | 4 | – | 7 | – | 0 |
| Cal Lutheran | 1 | – | 5 | – | 0 | 5 | – | 6 | – | 0 |
$ – Conference champion; ^ – NCAA Division II playoff participant; Rankings from NCAA Division II Football Committee poll

The 1987 Santa Clara Broncos football team represented Santa Clara University as a member of the Western Football Conference (WFC) during the 1987 NCAA Division II football season. The Broncos were led by third-year head coach Terry Malley. They played home games at Buck Shaw Stadium in Santa Clara, California. Santa Clara finished the season with a record of six wins and five losses (6–5, 3–3 WFC). The Broncos outscored their opponents 204–190 for the season.

== Schedule ==
| Date | Opponent | Rank | Site | Result | Attendance | Source |
|---|---|---|---|---|---|---|
| September 12 | Chico State* | | Buck Shaw Stadium; Santa Clara, CA | W 38–17 | 4,256 | |
| September 19 | Cal State Hayward* | | Buck Shaw Stadium; Santa Clara, CA | W 27–7 | 8,123 | |
| September 26 | at UC Davis* | No. 13 | Toomey Field; Davis, CA | L 15–21 | 7,111–7,311 | |
| October 3 | Sacramento State | | Buck Shaw Stadium; Santa Clara, CA | W 10–5 | 5,438 | |
| October 10 | at Southern Utah State | No. T–20 | Eccles Coliseum; Cedar City, UT | W 13–10 | 4,188 | |
| October 17 | Cal Lutheran | No. 19 | Buck Shaw Stadium; Santa Clara, CA | W 29–11 | 4,972 | |
| October 24 | at San Francisco State* | No. 14 | Cox Stadium; San Francisco, CA | W 28–7 | 1,000 | |
| October 31 | at Cal State Northridge | No. 9 | North Campus Stadium; Northridge, CA | L 6–7 | 1,850 | |
| November 7 | No. 4 Portland State | No. 19 | Buck Shaw Stadium; Santa Clara, CA | L 0–41 | 4,887 | |
| November 14 | Saint Mary's* | | Buck Shaw Stadium; Santa Clara, CA | L 25–31 | 9,036 | |
| November 21 | at Cal Poly | | Mustang Stadium; San Luis Obispo, CA | L 13–33 | 3,511 | |
*Non-conference game; Rankings from NCAA Division II Football Committee Poll released prior to the game
