= Bakari Grant =

American gridiron football player (born 1987)

No. 20
- Position: Wide receiver

Personal information
- Born: June 24, 1987 (age 39); Oakland, California, U.S.
- Listed height: 6 ft 4 in (1.93 m)
- Listed weight: 205 lb (93 kg)

Career information
- High school: St. Elizabeth High School
- College: UC Davis

Career history
- 2010: San Francisco 49ers*
- 2011–2015: Hamilton Tiger-Cats
- 2016: Calgary Stampeders
- 2017: Saskatchewan Roughriders
- 2018: Calgary Stampeders
- * Offseason or practice squad member only

Awards and highlights
- Grey Cup champion (2018); CFL East All-Star (2013)
- Stats at CFL.ca

Bakari Grant (born June 24, 1987) is an American former professional football wide receiver who played in the Canadian Football League (CFL) with the Hamilton Tiger-Cats, Calgary Stampeders, and Saskatchewan Roughriders. He was signed by the San Francisco 49ers as an undrafted free agent in 2010. Grant played college football at UC Davis.

== Professional career ==
=== San Francisco 49ers ===
After going undrafted in the 2010 NFL draft, Grant signed with the San Francisco 49ers of the National Football League. He was released without ever appearing in any games for the 49ers.

=== Hamilton Tiger-Cats ===
On May 30, 2011, Grant signed a contract with the Hamilton Tiger-Cats of the Canadian Football League. In his first season in the CFL Grant played in 13 of the 18 regular season games; accumulating 507 yards on 42 receptions with two touchdowns. His second season in the CFL was very similar to his first; he finished the year with 476 yards on 38 receptions and five touchdowns in 12 games played.

The 2013 season was a breakout year for Grant as he was named to his first CFL All-Star team. He played in 17 regular season games, and all three playoff games. During the season, he had career highs in receptions (69) and yards (947). In the 2013 playoffs, he averaged 3.4 catches and 64 yards per game. Grant and the Tiger-Cats were defeated by the Roughriders in the 101st Grey Cup. He played the entire regular season in 2014, however his overall production decreased. He finished the season with just 58 catches for 605 yards (average of only 3.2 catches for 33.6 yards per game). In the two playoff games, Grant totaled three catches for 50 yards. The Ti-Cats once again were defeated in the Grey Cup, this time losing to the Calgary Stampeders. He became a free agent on February 10, 2015, and re-signed with the Tiger-Cats on March 23, 2015. In his fifth season with the Ti-Cats Grant played in 10 games catching 35 passes for 492 receiving yards, with 4 touchdowns. Following the season he was not resigned by the Tiger-Cats and became a free agent on February 9, 2016.

=== Calgary Stampeders (first stint) ===
On the third day of free agency Grant signed with the Calgary Stampeders. In his only season with the Stamps Grant once again missed 8 regular season games with an injury. Prior to the injury he played in 10 games, catching 44 passes for 625 yards with 4 touchdowns. Grant was not re-signed by the Stamps following the 2016 season, and become a free agent in February 2017.

=== Saskatchewan Roughriders ===
On February 21, 2017, Grant and the Saskatchewan Roughriders agreed to a contract. Grant had the best season of his career in 2017, setting new career highs in receptions (84) and yards (1,033). Despite having statistically the best year of his career Grant was among the final players released by the Riders in preparation for the 2018 season.

=== Calgary Stampeders (second stint) ===
Bakari Grant signed with onto the Calgary Stampeders' practice roster on October 16, 2018, nearing the end of the 2018 regular season, after a slew of significant injuries to the team's wide receiver corps (Kamar Jorden, DaVaris Daniels, Marken Michel, Reggie Begelton). Grant was promoted to the active roster for the final game of the regular season, catching 4 passes for 47 yards. Grant and the Stampeders went on to win the Grey Cup, Grant's first championship.
