= 1987 Cal State Northridge Matadors football team =

American college football season

1987 Cal State Northridge Matadors football
- Conference: Western Football Conference
- Record: 7–4 (4–2 WFC)
- Head coach: Bob Burt (2nd season)
- Defensive coordinator: Mark Banker (5th season)
- Home stadium: North Campus Stadium

1987 Western Football Conference standings
	Conf.					Overall
Team	W		L		T	W		L		T
No. 3 Portland State $^	6	–	0	–	0	11	–	2	–	1
Cal State Northridge	4	–	2	–	0	7	–	4	–	0
Cal Poly	3	–	3	–	0	7	–	3	–	0
Santa Clara	3	–	3	–	0	6	–	5	–	0
Southern Utah State	2	–	4	–	0	5	–	6	–	0
Sacramento State	2	–	4	–	0	4	–	7	–	0
Cal Lutheran	1	–	5	–	0	5	–	6	–	0
$ – Conference champion; ^ – NCAA Division II playoff participant; Rankings from NCAA Division II Football Committee poll

The 1987 Cal State Northridge Matadors football team represented California State University, Northridge as a member of the Western Football Conference (WFC) during the 1987 NCAA Division II football season. Led by second-year head coach Bob Burt, Cal State Northridge compiled an overall record of 7–4 with a mark of 4–2 in conference play, placing second in the WFC. The team outscored its opponents 258 to 222 for the season. The Matadors played home games at North Campus Stadium in Northridge, California.

== Schedule ==
Date	Opponent	Rank	Site	Result	Attendance	Source
September 12	at Boise State*		Bronco Stadium; Boise, ID	L 0–30	18,534	
September 19	San Francisco State*		North Campus Stadium; Northridge, CA	W 45–0	3,564–3,654	
September 26	Sonoma State*		North Campus Stadium; Northridge, CA	W 13–6	3,426	
October 3	at Cal State Hayward*		Pioneer Stadium; Hayward, CA	W 38–27	500	
October 10	Cal Lutheran		North Campus Stadium; Northridge, CA	W 36–14	5,726	
October 17	at No. 11 Cal Poly		Mustang Stadium; San Luis Obispo, CA	L 20–21	6,327	
October 24	Southern Utah State		North Campus Stadium; Northridge, CA	W 56–36	5,520–6,526	
October 31	No. 9 Santa Clara		North Campus Stadium; Northridge, CA	W 7–6	1,850	
November 7	at UC Davis*	No. 17	Toomey Field; Davis, CA	L 0–28	5,607	
November 14	at No. 3 Portland State	No. 19	Civic Stadium; Portland, OR	L 22–38	11,929–11,939	
November 21	Sacramento State		North Campus Stadium; Northridge, CA	W 21–16	3,927	
*Non-conference game; Rankings from NCAA Division II Football Committee Poll released prior to the game
