= 1972 Cal State Hayward Pioneers football team =

American college football season

1972 Cal State Hayward Pioneers football
- Conference: Far Western Conference
- Record: 2–8 (2–3 FWC)
- Head coach: Bob Rodrigo (2nd season)
- Defensive coordinator: Tim Tierney (3rd season)
- Home stadium: Pioneer Stadium

1972 Far Western Conference football standings
| | Conf. | | | | | Overall |
| Team | W | | L | | T | W | | L | | T |
|---|---|---|---|---|---|---|---|---|---|---|
| UC Davis $ | 5 | – | 0 | – | 0 | 6 | – | 2 | – | 2 |
| Humboldt State | 4 | – | 1 | – | 0 | 7 | – | 3 | – | 0 |
| Chico State | 2 | – | 3 | – | 0 | 4 | – | 5 | – | 0 |
| Cal State Hayward | 2 | – | 3 | – | 0 | 2 | – | 8 | – | 0 |
| San Francisco State | 1 | – | 4 | – | 0 | 3 | – | 8 | – | 0 |
| Sacramento State | 1 | – | 4 | – | 0 | 2 | – | 8 | – | 0 |
$ – Conference champion

The 1972 Cal State Hayward Pioneers football team represented California State University, Hayward—now known as California State University, East Bay—as a member of the Far Western Conference (FWC) during the 1972 NCAA College Division football season. Led by second-year head coach Bob Rodrigo, Cal State Hayward compiled an overall record of 2–8 with a mark of 2–3 in conference play, tying for third place in the FWC. The team was outscored by its opponents 348 to 168 for the season. The Pioneers played home games at Pioneer Stadium in Hayward, California.

== Schedule ==
| Date | Opponent | Site | Result | Attendance | Source |
|---|---|---|---|---|---|
| September 9 | vs. Prairie View A&M* | Oakland–Alameda County Coliseum; Oakland, CA (Sickle Cell Anemia Football Classic) | L 0–16 | 10,052 | |
| September 16 | at Cal Poly* | Mustang Stadium; San Luis Obispo, CA | L 0–42 | 2,753 | |
| September 23 | at Cal State Fullerton* | Santa Ana Stadium; Santa Ana, CA | L 25–35 | 1,751–2,600 | |
| September 30 | Cal State Northridge* | Pioneer Stadium; Hayward, CA | L 0–45 | 2,000–2,003 | |
| October 14 | Sacramento State | Pioneer Stadium; Hayward, CA | W 21–0 | 2,100–6,752 | |
| October 21 | at Humboldt State | Redwood Bowl; Arcata, CA | L 33–59 | 7,000 | |
| October 28 | at UC Davis | Toomey Field; Davis, CA | L 16–27 | 2,157–7,000 | |
| November 4 | San Francisco State | Pioneer Stadium; Hayward, CA | W 48–41 | 500 | |
| November 11 | at Nevada* | Mackay Stadium; Reno, NV | L 8–48 | 1,500–2,109 | |
| November 18 | at Chico State | University Stadium; Chico, CA | L 17–35 | 3,000–5,000 | |
*Non-conference game
