= 1987 NCAA Division II football season =

American college football season

- Regular season: August – November 1987
- Playoffs: November 28 – December 12, 1987
- National Championship: Braly Municipal Stadium; Florence, AL
- Champion: Troy State (2)
- Harlon Hill Trophy: Johnny Bailey, Texas A&I

The 1987 NCAA Division II football season, part of college football in the United States organized by the National Collegiate Athletic Association at the Division II level, began in August 1987, and concluded with the NCAA Division II Football Championship on December 12, 1987, at Braly Municipal Stadium in Florence, Alabama, hosted by the University of North Alabama. The Troy State Trojans defeated the Portland State Vikings, 31–17, to win their second Division II national title.

The Harlon Hill Trophy was awarded to Johnny Bailey, running back from Texas A&I.

== Conference changes and new programs ==
- One program departed Division II for Division I-AA prior to the season.

School	1986 Conference	1987 Conference
Central State (OH)	Independent	NAIA Independent
Franklin (IN)	Heartland	NAIA Independent
Howard Payne	Lone Star	NAIA Independent
Northern Michigan	D-II Independent	GLIAC
Northwood	GLIAC	NAIA Independent
Towson State	Independent	I-AA Independent

== Conference standings ==
1987 Central Intercollegiate Athletic Association football standings
	Conf.					Overall
Team	W		L		T	W		L		T
Northern Division
No. 15 Hampton xy	6	–	1	–	0	9	–	3	–	0
Virginia State	6	–	1	–	0	7	–	3	–	1
Virginia Union	4	–	3	–	0	7	–	3	–	0
Norfolk State	2	–	5	–	0	4	–	7	–	0
Elizabeth City State	1	–	6	–	0	3	–	8	–	0
Saint Paul's (VA)	0	–	7	–	0	0	–	11	–	0
Southern Division
No. 12 Winston-Salem State xy$^	7	–	0	–	0	9	–	3	–	0
Fayetteville State	4	–	1	–	2	6	–	2	–	2
Johnson C. Smith	4	–	2	–	1	4	–	5	–	2
North Carolina Central	3	–	4	–	0	6	–	5	–	0
Bowie State	2	–	4	–	1	4	–	6	–	1
Livingstone	2	–	5	–	0	2	–	8	–	0
Championship: Winston-Salem State 22, Hampton 12
$ – Conference champion; x – Division champion/co-champions; y – Championship game participant; ^ – NCAA Division II playoff participant; Rankings from NCAA Division II Football Committee poll

1987 Great Lakes Intercollegiate Athletic Conference football standings
	Conf.					Overall
Team	W		L		T	W		L		T
No. 5 Northern Michigan $^	4	–	0	–	0	10	–	2	–	0
Grand Valley State	4	–	1	–	0	7	–	4	–	0
Hillsdale	2	–	3	–	0	6	–	5	–	0
Saginaw Valley State	2	–	3	–	0	5	–	5	–	0
Ferris State	2	–	3	–	0	4	–	7	–	0
Wayne State (MI)	0	–	4	–	0	4	–	6	–	0
$ – Conference champion; ^ – NCAA Division II playoff participant; Rankings from NCAA Division II Football Committee poll

1987 Gulf South Conference football standings
	Conf.					Overall
Team	W		L		T	W		L		T
No. 4 Troy State $^	8	–	0	–	0	12	–	1	–	1
Mississippi College	5	–	3	–	0	6	–	5	–	0
North Alabama	4	–	3	–	1	7	–	3	–	1
Valdosta State	4	–	4	–	0	6	–	4	–	0
Delta State	3	–	4	–	1	6	–	4	–	1
Jacksonville State	3	–	4	–	1	5	–	4	–	1
Livingston	3	–	4	–	1	5	–	5	–	1
Tennessee–Martin	3	–	5	–	0	5	–	6	–	0
West Georgia	1	–	7	–	0	2	–	9	–	0
$ – Conference champion; ^ – NCAA Division II playoff participant; Rankings from NCAA Division II Football Committee poll

1987 Heartland Collegiate Conference standings
	Conf.					Overall
Team	W		L		T	W		L		T
Butler $	4	–	0	–	1	8	–	1	–	1
Ashland	3	–	1	–	1	7	–	2	–	1
Indianapolis	3	–	2	–	0	6	–	4	–	0
Valparaiso	2	–	3	–	0	3	–	6	–	0
Saint Joseph's (IN)	1	–	3	–	1	5	–	4	–	1
Evansville	0	–	4	–	1	4	–	5	–	1
$ – Conference champion

1987 Lone Star Conference football standings
	Conf.					Overall
Team	W		L		T	W		L		T
No. 1 Texas A&I +	4	–	1	–	0	9	–	2	–	0
No. 9 Angelo State +^	4	–	1	–	0	8	–	3	–	0
No. 13 Eastern New Mexico	3	–	2	–	0	9	–	2	–	0
Abilene Christian	2	–	3	–	0	5	–	6	–	0
West Texas State	2	–	3	–	0	5	–	6	–	0
East Texas State	0	–	5	–	0	2	–	9	–	0
+ – Conference co-champions; ^ – NCAA Division II playoff participant; Rankings from NCAA Division II Football Committee poll

1987 Missouri Intercollegiate Athletic Association football standings
	Conf.					Overall
Team	W		L		T	W		L		T
Central Missouri State +	4	–	0	–	1	7	–	3	–	1
SE Missouri State +	4	–	0	–	1	6	–	4	–	1
NE Missouri State	3	–	2	–	0	4	–	7	–	0
Missouri–Rolla	2	–	3	–	0	5	–	5	–	0
NW Missouri State	1	–	4	–	0	3	–	8	–	0
Lincoln (MO)	0	–	5	–	0	2	–	9	–	0
+ – Conference co-champions

1987 North Central Conference football standings
	Conf.					Overall
Team	W		L		T	W		L		T
No. 7 Mankato State $^	8	–	1	–	0	9	–	3	–	0
St. Cloud State	6	–	3	–	0	7	–	4	–	0
North Dakota State	6	–	3	–	0	6	–	4	–	0
Nebraska–Omaha	5	–	4	–	0	7	–	4	–	0
South Dakota	5	–	4	–	0	7	–	4	–	0
North Dakota	5	–	4	–	0	6	–	4	–	0
South Dakota State	4	–	5	–	0	5	–	5	–	0
Morningside	3	–	6	–	0	4	–	7	–	0
Northern Colorado	2	–	7	–	0	3	–	8	–	0
Augustana (SD)	1	–	8	–	0	2	–	9	–	0
$ – Conference champion; ^ – NCAA Division II playoff participant; Rankings from NCAA Division II Football Committee poll

1987 Northern California Athletic Conference football standings
	Conf.					Overall
Team	W		L		T	W		L		T
No. 10 UC Davis $	5	–	0	–	0	8	–	2	–	0
Chico State	3	–	2	–	0	3	–	6	–	0
Humboldt State	2	–	2	–	1	3	–	7	–	1
Sonoma State	2	–	3	–	0	5	–	6	–	0
Cal State Hayward	2	–	3	–	0	2	–	8	–	0
San Francisco State	0	–	4	–	1	1	–	8	–	1
$ – Conference champion; Rankings from NCAA Division II Football Committee poll

1987 Northern Intercollegiate Conference football standings
	Conf.					Overall
Team	W		L		T	W		L		T
Minnesota Morris $	5	–	1	–	0	7	–	3	–	0
No. 14 Southwest State (MN)	4	–	1	–	1	7	–	4	–	1
No. 16 Moorhead State ^	4	–	2	–	0	9	–	3	–	0
Northern State	4	–	2	–	0	7	–	4	–	0
Winona State	2	–	4	–	0	3	–	8	–	0
Bemidji State	0	–	5	–	1	2	–	7	–	1
Minnesota Duluth	0	–	6	–	0	0	–	11	–	0
$ – Conference champion; ^ – NAIA Division I playoff participant Minnesota Duluth forfeited 8 wins including 5 conference wins, over Minnesota Morris, Moorhead State, Northern State, Winona State, and Bemidji State.; Rankings from NAIA Division I poll

1987 Pennsylvania State Athletic Conference football standings
	Conf.					Overall
Team	W		L		T	W		L		T
East Division
No. 2 West Chester xy	6	–	0	–	0	9	–	2	–	0
No. 14 Bloomsburg	4	–	2	–	0	8	–	3	–	0
Millersville	4	–	2	–	0	7	–	3	–	0
Kutztown	3	–	3	–	0	3	–	7	–	0
East Stroudsburg	2	–	4	–	0	4	–	6	–	0
Mansfield	2	–	4	–	0	4	–	6	–	0
Cheyney	0	–	6	–	0	2	–	8	–	0
West Division
No. 6 IUP xy$^	6	–	0	–	0	10	–	2	–	0
No. 16 Clarion	5	–	1	–	0	7	–	3	–	0
California (PA)	3	–	3	–	0	6	–	5	–	0
Shippensburg	3	–	3	–	0	4	–	6	–	0
Slippery Rock	3	–	3	–	0	4	–	6	–	0
Edinboro	1	–	5	–	0	3	–	8	–	0
Lock Haven	0	–	6	–	0	2	–	9	–	0
Championship: IUP 21, West Chester 9
$ – Conference champion; x – Division champion/co-champions; y – Championship game participant; ^ – NCAA Division II playoff participant; Rankings from NCAA Division II Football Committee poll

1987 Southern Intercollegiate Athletic Conference football standings
	Conf.					Overall
Team	W		L		T	W		L		T
Division II
No. 18 Alabama A&M* x	6	–	1	–	0	8	–	3	–	0
No. 20 Tuskegee x	6	–	1	–	0	8	–	2	–	0
Albany State	5	–	2	–	0	8	–	3	–	0
Fort Valley State	3	–	4	–	0	4	–	6	–	0
Savannah State	3	–	4	–	0	4	–	6	–	0
Morehouse	3	–	4	–	0	4	–	6	–	0
Morris Brown	2	–	5	–	0	2	–	8	–	1
Clark	0	–	7	–	0	1	–	8	–	0
Division III
Knoxville x	5	–	0	–	0	7	–	1	–	0
Lane	1	–	4	–	0	1	–	7	–	1
Miles	0	–	5	–	0	1	–	8	–	0
x – Division champion/co-champions; * - Alabama A&M's loss to North Alabama was counted as a conference loss because they did not play a full SIAC schedule.; Rankings from 1987 NCAA Division II football rankings

1987 Western Football Conference standings
	Conf.					Overall
Team	W		L		T	W		L		T
No. 3 Portland State $^	6	–	0	–	0	11	–	2	–	1
Cal State Northridge	4	–	2	–	0	7	–	4	–	0
Cal Poly	3	–	3	–	0	7	–	3	–	0
Santa Clara	3	–	3	–	0	6	–	5	–	0
Southern Utah State	2	–	4	–	0	5	–	6	–	0
Sacramento State	2	–	4	–	0	4	–	7	–	0
Cal Lutheran	1	–	5	–	0	5	–	6	–	0
$ – Conference champion; ^ – NCAA Division II playoff participant; Rankings from NCAA Division II Football Committee poll

1987 NCAA Division II independents football records
	Conf.			Overall
Team	W	L	T	W		L		T
No. 16 New Haven		–		8	–	2	–	0
Saint Mary's		–		8	–	3	–	0
No. 11 UCF ^		–		9	–	4	–	0
Springfield		–		5	–	3	–	1
Central Connecticut		–		4	–	4	–	1
American International		–		3	–	5	–	2
Liberty		–		3	–	7	–	0
Kentucky State		–		2	–	8	–	1
Michigan Tech		–		2	–	7	–	0
Southern Connecticut State		–		1	–	9	–	0
^ – NCAA Division II playoff participant; Rankings from NCAA Division II Football Committee poll

== Conference summaries ==
Conference Champions

Central Intercollegiate Athletic Association – Winston-Salem State
Great Lakes Intercollegiate Athletic Conference – Northern Michigan
Gulf South Conference – Troy State
Heartland Collegiate Conference – Butler
Lone Star Conference – Angelo State and Texas A&I
Missouri Intercollegiate Athletic Association – Central Missouri State and Southeast Missouri State
North Central Conference – Minnesota State–Mankato
Northern California Athletic Conference – UC Davis
Northern Intercollegiate Conference – Minnesota–Morris
Pennsylvania State Athletic Conference – Indiana (PA)
Rocky Mountain Athletic Conference – Colorado Mesa
South Atlantic Conference – Gardner–Webb
Southern Intercollegiate Athletic Conference – Alabama A&M and Tuskegee
Western Football League – Portland State

== Postseason ==
1987 NCAA Division II Football Championship
- Teams: 8
- Finals Site: Braly Municipal Stadium; Florence, AL
- Champion: Troy State; (2nd title, 2nd title game)
- Runner-up: Portland State; (1st title game)
- Semifinalists: Northern Michigan; Central Florida
- Winning coach: Rick Rhoades; 1st championship

The 1987 NCAA Division II Football Championship playoffs were the 15th single-elimination tournament to determine the national champion of men's NCAA Division II college football. The championship game was held at Braly Municipal Stadium in Florence, Alabama, for the second time.

=== Playoff bracket ===
First round Campus sites
Portland State	27
Mankato State	21
Northern Michigan	23*
Angelo State	20
UCF	12
IUP	10
Troy State	45
Winston-Salem State	14

Semifinals; Campus sites
Portland State	13
Northern Michigan	7
UCF	10
Troy State	31

Championship; Braly Municipal Stadium; Florence, AL
Portland State	17
Troy State	31

== See also ==
- 1987 NCAA Division I-A football season
- 1987 NCAA Division I-AA football season
- 1987 NCAA Division III football season
- 1987 NAIA Division I football season
- 1987 NAIA Division II football season
