= 1972 Chico State Wildcats football team =

American college football season

1972 Chico State Wildcats football
- Conference: Far Western Conference
- Record: 4–5 (2–3 FWC)
- Head coach: Pete Riehlman (5th season)
- Home stadium: University Stadium

1972 Far Western Conference football standings
	Conf.					Overall
Team	W		L		T	W		L		T
UC Davis $	5	–	0	–	0	6	–	2	–	2
Humboldt State	4	–	1	–	0	7	–	3	–	0
Chico State	2	–	3	–	0	4	–	5	–	0
Cal State Hayward	2	–	3	–	0	2	–	8	–	0
San Francisco State	1	–	4	–	0	3	–	8	–	0
Sacramento State	1	–	4	–	0	2	–	8	–	0
$ – Conference champion

The 1972 Chico State Wildcats football team represented California State University, Chico as a member of the Far Western Conference (FWC) during the 1972 NCAA College Division football season. Led by fifth-year head coach Pete Riehlman, Chico State compiled an overall record of 4–5 with a mark of 2–3 in conference play, tying for third place in the FWC. The team was outscored by its opponents 188 to 154 for the season. The Wildcats played home games at University Stadium in Chico, California.

== Schedule ==
Date	Opponent	Site	Result	Attendance	Source
September 16	at Southern Oregon*	Fuller Field; Ashland, OR	L 7–14	3,000	
September 23	Willamette*	University Stadium; Chico, CA	W 10–6	6,000	
September 30	Redlands*	University Stadium; Chico, CA	W 21–12	6,500	
October 7	at Sacramento State	Hornet Stadium; Sacramento, CA	W 17–16	3,000–4,100	
October 14	at Humboldt State	Redwood Bowl; Arcata, CA	L 0–14	2,000	
October 21	UC Davis	University Stadium; Chico, CA	L 17–41	6,000	
October 28	at San Francisco State	Cox Stadium; San Francisco, CA	L 10–20	1,000	
November 4	at Nevada*	Mackay Stadium; Reno, NV	L 37–48	1,000–2,000	
November 18	Cal State Hayward	University Stadium; Chico, CA	W 35–17	3,000–5,000	
*Non-conference game
