= 1987 UC Davis Aggies football team =

American college football season

1987 UC Davis Aggies football

NCAC champion
- Conference: Northern California Athletic Conference
- Record: 8–2 (5–0 NCAC)
- Head coach: Jim Sochor (18th season)
- Home stadium: Toomey Field

1987 Northern California Athletic Conference football standings
	Conf.					Overall
Team	W		L		T	W		L		T
No. 10 UC Davis $	5	–	0	–	0	8	–	2	–	0
Chico State	3	–	2	–	0	3	–	6	–	0
Humboldt State	2	–	2	–	1	3	–	7	–	1
Sonoma State	2	–	3	–	0	5	–	6	–	0
Cal State Hayward	2	–	3	–	0	2	–	8	–	0
San Francisco State	0	–	4	–	1	1	–	8	–	1
$ – Conference champion; Rankings from NCAA Division II Football Committee poll

The 1987 UC Davis football team represented the University of California, Davis as a member of the Northern California Athletic Conference (NCAC) during the 1987 NCAA Division II football season. Led by 18th-year head coach Jim Sochor, UC Davis compiled an overall record of 8–2 with a mark of 5–0 in conference play, winning the NCAC title for the 17th consecutive season. 1986 was the team's 18th consecutive winning season. With the 5–0 conference record, the team stretched their conference winning streak to 36 games dating back to the 1981 season. The Aggies were ranked No. 10 in the final NCAA Division II poll. Unlike the previous five seasons, the Aggies did not qualify for the NCAA Division II Football Championship playoffs in 1987. The team outscored its opponents 238 to 163 for the season. The Aggies played home games at Toomey Field in Davis, California.

== Schedule ==
Date	Opponent	Rank	Site	Result	Attendance	Source
September 19	at Nevada*	No. 7	Mackay Stadium; Reno, NV	L 17–34	15,630	
September 26	No. 13 Santa Clara		Toomey Field; Davis, CA	W 21–15	7,111–7,311	
October 3	at No. 18 Cal Poly*	No. 12	Mustang Stadium; San Luis Obispo, CA (rivalry)	L 0–41	5,688	
October 10	at Chico State		University Stadium; Chico, CA	W 24–22	6,127–7,800	
October 17	San Francisco State		Toomey Field; Davis, CA	W 31–0	8,660	
October 24	Cal State Hayward		Toomey Field; Davis, CA	W 23–14	5,200–5,325	
October 31	at Sonoma State		Cossacks Stadium (Note: Seawolf Stadium was known as Cossacks Stadium until 2002 when the University changed the mascot from Cossacks to Seawolves.); Rohnert Park, CA	W 25–14	2,681	
November 7	No. 17 Cal State Northridge*		Toomey Field; Davis, CA	W 28–0	5,607	
November 14	at Sacramento State	No. 14	Charles C. Hughes Stadium; Sacramento, CA (Causeway Classic)	W 28–10	10,000	
November 21	Humboldt State	No. 10	Toomey Field; Davis, CA	W 41–13	5,315–5,350	
*Non-conference game; Rankings from NCAA Division II Football Committee Poll released prior to the game
