= 1987 Cal Poly Mustangs football team =

American college football season

1987 Cal Poly Mustangs football
- Conference: Western Football Conference
- Record: 7–3 (3–3 WFC)
- Head coach: Lyle Setencich (1st season)
- Home stadium: Mustang Stadium

1987 Western Football Conference standings
	Conf.					Overall
Team	W		L		T	W		L		T
No. 3 Portland State $^	6	–	0	–	0	11	–	2	–	1
Cal State Northridge	4	–	2	–	0	7	–	4	–	0
Cal Poly	3	–	3	–	0	7	–	3	–	0
Santa Clara	3	–	3	–	0	6	–	5	–	0
Southern Utah State	2	–	4	–	0	5	–	6	–	0
Sacramento State	2	–	4	–	0	4	–	7	–	0
Cal Lutheran	1	–	5	–	0	5	–	6	–	0
$ – Conference champion; ^ – NCAA Division II playoff participant; Rankings from NCAA Division II Football Committee poll

The 1987 Cal Poly Mustangs football team represented California Polytechnic State University, San Luis Obispo as a member of the Western Football Conference (WFC) during the 1987 NCAA Division II football season. Led by first-year head coach Lyle Setencich, Cal Poly compiled an overall record of 7–3 with a mark of 3–3 in conference play, tying for third place in the WFC. The team was outscored by its opponents 275 to 173 for the season. The Mustangs played home games at Mustang Stadium in San Luis Obispo, California.

== Schedule ==
Date	Opponent	Rank	Site	Result	Attendance	Source
September 12	Humboldt State*		Mustang Stadium; San Luis Obispo, CA	W 30–24	4,401	
September 19	at Cal Lutheran		Mt. Clef Field; Thousand Oaks, CA	W 51–23	2,108	
September 26	at Chico State*		University Stadium; Chico, CA	W 32–17	3,500–4,608	
October 3	No. 12 UC Davis*	No. 19	Mustang Stadium; San Luis Obispo, CA (rivalry)	W 41–0	5,688–6,643	
October 10	at Cal State Hayward*	No. 13	Pioneer Stadium; Hayward, CA	W 40–14	100–1,000	
October 17	Cal State Northridge	No. 11	Mustang Stadium; San Luis Obispo, CA	W 21–20	6,327	
October 24	at Sacramento State	No. 8	Hornet Stadium; Sacramento, CA	L 13–21	4,200	
October 31	Portland State	No. 14	Mustang Stadium; San Luis Obispo, CA	L 7–31	5,082	
November 14	at Southern Utah State	No. 17	Eccles Coliseum; Cedar City, UT	L 7–10	400–438	
November 21	Santa Clara		Mustang Stadium; San Luis Obispo, CA	W 33–13	3,511	
*Non-conference game; Rankings from NCAA Division II Football Committee Poll released prior to the game
