= 1972 San Francisco State Gators football team =

American college football season

1972 San Francisco State Gators football
- Conference: Far Western Conference
- Record: 3–8 (1–4 FWC)
- Head coach: Vic Rowen (12th season)
- Offensive coordinator: Dick Logan (3rd season)
- Home stadium: Cox Stadium

1972 Far Western Conference football standings
| | Conf. | | | | | Overall |
| Team | W | | L | | T | W | | L | | T |
|---|---|---|---|---|---|---|---|---|---|---|
| UC Davis $ | 5 | – | 0 | – | 0 | 6 | – | 2 | – | 2 |
| Humboldt State | 4 | – | 1 | – | 0 | 7 | – | 3 | – | 0 |
| Chico State | 2 | – | 3 | – | 0 | 4 | – | 5 | – | 0 |
| Cal State Hayward | 2 | – | 3 | – | 0 | 2 | – | 8 | – | 0 |
| San Francisco State | 1 | – | 4 | – | 0 | 3 | – | 8 | – | 0 |
| Sacramento State | 1 | – | 4 | – | 0 | 2 | – | 8 | – | 0 |
$ – Conference champion

The 1972 San Francisco State Gators football team represented California State University, San Francisco—now known as San Francisco State University—as a member of the Far Western Conference (FWC) during the 1972 NCAA College Division football season. Led by 12th-year head coach Vic Rowen, San Francisco State compiled an overall record of 3–8 with a mark of 1–4 in conference play, tying for fifth place in the FWC. For the season the team was outscored by its opponents 323 to 250. The Gators played home games at Cox Stadium in San Francisco.

== Schedule ==
| Date | Opponent | Site | Result | Attendance | Source |
|---|---|---|---|---|---|
| September 9 | at Nevada* | Mackay Stadium; Reno, NV | L 6–37 | 4,000 | |
| September 16 | at Northern Arizona* | Lumberjack Stadium; Flagstaff, AZ | L 10–31 | 6,826 | |
| September 23 | Cal State Northridge* | Cox Stadium; San Francisco, CA | L 0–23 | 1,500 | |
| September 30 | at Saint Mary's* | Saint Mary's Stadium; Moraga, CA | W 38–12 | | |
| October 7 | UC Davis | Cox Stadium; San Francisco, CA | L 32–47 | 2,500 | |
| October 14 | at Cal Lutheran* | Mt. Clef Field; Thousand Oaks, CA | L 14–21 | 2,000 | |
| October 21 | Azusa Pacific* | Cox Stadium; San Francisco, CA | W 55–29 | | |
| October 28 | Chico State | Cox Stadium; San Francisco, CA | W 20–10 | 1,000 | |
| November 4 | at Cal State Hayward | Pioneer Stadium; Hayward, CA | L 41–48 | 500 | |
| November 11 | Sacramento State | Cox Stadium; San Francisco, CA | L 13–14 | 1,000 | |
| November 18 | at Humboldt State | Redwood Bowl; Arcata, CA | L 21–51 | 4,000 | |
*Non-conference game
