= Mike Moroski =

American football player and coach (born 1957)

College of Idaho Yotes
- Title: Head coach

Personal information
- Born: September 4, 1957 (age 69); Bakersfield, California, U.S.
- Listed height: 6 ft 4 in (1.93 m)
- Listed weight: 200 lb (91 kg)

Career information
- High school: Novato (Novato, California)
- College: UC Davis
- NFL draft: 1979: 6th round, 154th overall pick

Career history

Playing
- Atlanta Falcons (1979–1984); Houston Oilers (1985); San Francisco 49ers (1986)

Coaching
- UC Davis (1987–1988) Quarterbacks coach; UC Davis (1989–1991) Quarterbacks coach & junior varsity coach; UC Davis (1992) Quarterbacks coach & wide receivers coach; UC Davis (1993–1997) Offensive coordinator & wide receivers coach; UC Davis (1998–2009) Offensive coordinator & offensive line coach; UC Davis (2010) Offensive coordinator & tight ends coach; UC Davis (2011) Tight ends coach; UC Davis (2012) Running backs coach; College of Idaho (2013–present) Head coach

Awards and highlights
- As player: 2× First-team All-Far West (1977, 1978); UC Davis Hall of Fame; As coach: 4 Frontier championships (2019–2022); 2 Frontier West Division championships (2025–2026); Frontier Conference Coach of the Year (2019); 2x Frontier West Division Coach of the Year (2025–2026); Division II Assistant coach of the Year (1999)

Career NFL statistics
- Passing attempts: 425
- Passing completions: 241
- Completion percentage: 56.7%
- TD–INT: 8–18
- Passing yards: 2,864
- Passer rating: 70.2
- Stats at Pro Football Reference

Head coaching record
- Regular season: 86–44 (.662)
- Postseason: 5–3 (.625)
- Career: 91–47 (.659)

Michael Henry Moroski (born September 4, 1957) is an American college football coach and former player. He is the head football coach for the College of Idaho, a position he has held since 2013. Moroski played eight seasons as a quarterback in the National Football League (NFL) with the Atlanta Falcons, the Houston Oilers and the San Francisco 49ers. He played college football for the UC Davis Aggies.

== College career ==
=== Football ===
Moroski attended the University of California at Davis, where he played quarterback for the UC Davis Aggies football team under head coach Jim Sochor before graduating in 1979. In 1977, Moroski threw for a career high 353 yards and four touchdown passes while completing 21-of-46 pass attempts against Lehigh. In 1978, Moroski's regular season passing rating was a Division II-leading 145.84. He holds the Division II and school record with a 99-yard touchdown pass in a 28–13 victory against Puget Sound in 1978. Moroski was recognized in 1977 and 1978 for his play, being named two-time first team Far West all-conference.

=== Baseball ===
He was also a pitcher on the Aggies baseball team. Over four seasons, Moroski earned 20 victories which is tied for seventh in school history. In 1977, Moroski led the pitching staff with a 2.57 earned run average in 91 innings pitched. Moroski is third all time with 20 complete games pitched, behind Steve Brown and Lee Jackson.

Moroski was enshrined into the Cal Aggie Athletic Hall of Fame in 1985.

== Professional career ==
Moroski played in every game of each of the 1983 and 1984 seasons as well as 15 in 1986. He threw for over 1,200 yards in 1984. On November 27, 1983, Moroski threw for 303 yards and a career high 2 touchdowns in a 47–41 victory against the Green Bay Packers. On November 11, 1986, Moroski threw for a career high 332 yards against the New Orleans Saints. In his final season, when he played for the 49ers, Moroski threw Jerry Rice one of his NFL record 197 touchdown receptions.

== NFL career statistics ==
Legend
**Bold**	Career high

=== Regular season ===
Year	Team	Games			Passing									Rushing					Sacked		Fumbles	
Year	Team	GP	GS	Record	Cmp	Att	Pct	Yds	Y/A	Lng	TD	Int	Rtg	Att	Yds	Y/A	Lng	TD	Sck	SckY	Fum	Lost
1979	ATL	2	0	0–0	8	15	53.3	97	6.5	23	0	0	73.5	3	31	**10.3**	**19**	**1**	2	12	1	–
1980	ATL	3	0	0–0	2	3	66.7	24	8.0	18	0	0	91.0	0	0	0	0	0	0	0	0	0
1981	ATL	3	0	0–0	12	26	46.2	132	5.1	22	0	1	45.7	3	17	5.7	14	0	0	0	0	0
1982	ATL	9	0	0–0	10	13	**76.9**	87	6.7	15	1	0	**119.7**	0	0	0.0	0	0	4	31	0	0
1983	ATL	**16**	2	1–1	45	70	64.3	575	**8.2**	50	**2**	4	75.6	2	12	6.0	7	0	4	31	2	–
1984	ATL	**16**	**5**	1–4	**102**	**191**	53.4	**1,207**	6.3	48	**2**	**9**	56.8	**21**	**98**	4.7	17	0	**20**	**151**	**6**	–
1985	HOU	5	0	0–0	20	34	58.8	249	7.3	46	1	1	79.2	2	2	1.0	2	0	4	25	0	0
1986	SFO	15	2	1–1	42	73	57.5	493	6.8	**52**	**2**	3	70.2	6	22	3.7	12	**1**	6	52	3	–
Career		69	9	3–6	241	425	56.7	2,864	6.7	52	8	18	66.0	37	182	4.9	19	2	40	312	12	–

== Coaching career ==
Moroski was a coach at his alma mater, UC Davis, starting in 1988, not long after the completion of his NFL career. He started as the junior varsity coach and worked his way up to offensive coordinator. He served in that role for more than 15 years. Moroski also coached the offensive line for UC Davis.

Moroski was announced as the new head football coach for the College of Idaho on January 9, 2013. As the head coach of the Coyotes, he has won 4 Frontier championships (2019, 2020, 2021, 2022) and 2 Frontier West Division championship (2025, 2026).

== Personal life ==
Moroski went to Novato High School. He has four children—Nate, Will, Ben, and Emmie—and lives with his wife, Cathie, in Caldwell, Idaho.

== Head coaching record ==
Year	Team	Overall	Conference	Standing	Bowl/playoffs	NAIA^{#}
**College of Idaho Coyotes** (Frontier Conference) (2014–present)
2014	College of Idaho	4–7	3–7	6th		
2015	College of Idaho	4–7	4–6	T–4th		
2016	College of Idaho	4–7	3–7	7th		
2017	College of Idaho	6–5	6–4	T–2nd		
2018	College of Idaho	6–5	6–4	T–2nd		
2019	College of Idaho	11–1	10–0	1st	**L** NAIA Quarterfinal	5
2020–21	College of Idaho	3–1	3–1	T–1st		19
2021	College of Idaho	7–3	7–3	T–1st		25
2022	College of Idaho	8–2	8–2	T–1st		18
2023	College of Idaho	10–3	6–2	T–2nd	**L** NAIA Semifinal	T–10
2024	College of Idaho	7–4	5–3	5th		
2025	College of Idaho	11–2	6–0	1st (West)	**L** NAIA Semifinal	4
2026	College of Idaho	10–0	6–0	1st (West)		
College of Idaho:		91–47	72–39			
Total:		91–47				
National championship Conference title Conference division title or championship game berth
