= Jeff Allen (defensive back, born 1958) =

American gridiron football player (born 1958)

No. 43, 27, 5
- Position: Defensive back

Personal information
- Born: July 1, 1958 (age 68); Richmond, Indiana, U.S.
- Listed height: 5 ft 11 in (1.80 m)
- Listed weight: 185 lb (84 kg)

Career information
- High school: Cordova (Rancho Cordova, California)
- College: UC Davis
- NFL draft: 1980: 8th round, 212th overall pick

Career history
- Miami Dolphins (1980); Toronto Argonauts (1981); BC Lions (1981); San Diego Chargers (1982); San Francisco 49ers (1983)*
- * Offseason or practice squad member only

Career NFL statistics
- Interceptions: 1
- Stats at Pro Football Reference

Jeffrey Allen (born July 1, 1958) is an American former professional football player who was a defensive back in the National Football League (NFL) and Canadian Football League (CFL). He played college football for the UC Davis Aggies. Allen was drafted by the Miami Dolphins in the eighth round of the 1980 NFL draft. He also played in the NFL for the San Diego Chargers, and San Francisco 49ers, as well as one game for the Toronto Argonauts in the CFL. He appeared in 25 career NFL games, while making nine starts.

== Early career ==
Allen played college football at the University of California, Davis for the Aggies. In his final year with the Aggies (1980), he was awarded the Colby E. "Babe" Slater Award, which is awarded to the male athlete of the year.

== Professional career ==
Allen was selected by the Miami Dolphins in the eighth round (212th overall) of the 1980 NFL draft. In his rookie season, Allen played in all 16 regular season games for the Dolphins, where he was used primarily as a cornerback. He remained on the team through the off-season but was waived in mid-August.

The Toronto Argonauts were struggling heavily by August 1981 after losing eight consecutive games. Along with five other cut NFL players, Allen was signed in an attempt to improve the team. Allen and Elbert Roberts were expected to replace Marcellus Greene and Hank Williams. The Argonauts instead started Allen at safety for his CFL debut against the Calgary Stampeders on September 7, 1981. He was released the following week after starting only one game for the Argonauts. The Argonauts later re-signed Allen and traded him to the BC Lions for running back Calvin Murray, although Allen played no games for the Lions.

Before the 1982 season, the San Diego Chargers signed Allen. He played in the season opener against the Kansas City Chiefs. The secondary unit was praised for allowing only 3 points despite fielding two new starters, Allen and Andre Young. He went on to start in nine regular season games with the Chargers. Allen intercepted a pass from Terry Bradshaw intended for Lynn Swann in the Chargers' first round playoff win against the Pittsburgh Steelers, but the Chargers lost in the second round to the Miami Dolphins. Prior to the 1983 season, the Chargers traded Allen to the San Francisco 49ers for a draft pick, but Allen was cut during the preseason and never played for the 49ers.
