= Casey Merrill =

American football player (born 1957)

No. 78, 71
- Positions: Defensive end, defensive tackle

Personal information
- Born: July 16, 1957 (age 69); Oakland, California, U.S.
- Listed height: 6 ft 4 in (1.93 m)
- Listed weight: 254 lb (115 kg)

Career information
- High school: Monte Vista (Danville, California)
- College: UC Davis
- NFL draft: 1979: 5th round, 113th overall pick

Career history
- Green Bay Packers (1979–1983); New York Giants (1983-1985); New Orleans Saints (1986)

Career NFL statistics
- Sacks: 29
- Fumble recoveries: 4
- Stats at Pro Football Reference

Richard Casey Merrill (born July 16, 1957) is an American former professional football player who was a defensive end in the National Football League (NFL) for the Green Bay Packers (1979–1983), New York Giants (1983–1985) and New Orleans Saints (1986). He played college football for the UC Davis Aggies and was selected by the Packers in the fifth round of the 1979 NFL draft.

== Professional career ==
Merrill spent nine seasons in professional football as a defensive end and outside linebacker. Blessed with exceptional speed (4.65 40 yard dash), Merrill became the first designated pass rusher in the NFL to line up and pass rush from both defensive line and linebacker positions. In the 1981 season Merrill had 7 sacks and 3 fumble recoveries for the Green Bay Packers. In the strike shortened 1982 season Casey had 4 sacks. In 1984 with the New York Giants, Merrill led all Giant defensive lineman with 11.5 sacks, including 1 in the playoffs against the San Francisco 49ers bringing Joe Montana down with a crushing hit.
