= Tim Plough =

American football player and coach (born 1985)

Current position
- Title: Head coach
- Team: UC Davis
- Conference: Big Sky
- Record: 21–7

Biographical details
- Born: June 24, 1985 (age 41); San Diego, California, U.S.

Playing career
- 2003–2007: UC Davis
- Position: Quarterback

Coaching career (HC unless noted)
- 2008: UC Davis (SA)
- 2009: UC Davis (QB)
- 2010–2012: UC Davis (PGC/QB)
- 2013–2014: Northern Arizona (WR)
- 2015–2016: Northern Arizona (OC/QB)
- 2017–2018: UC Davis (OC/QB)
- 2019–2020: UC Davis (AHC/OC/QB)
- 2021–2022: Boise State (OC/QB)
- 2023: California (TE)
- 2024–present: UC Davis

Head coaching record
- Overall: 21–7
- Tournaments: 2–2

Timothy Plough (PLOW; born June 24, 1985) is an American college football coach and former player. He is head football coach for the University of California, Davis (UC Davis), a position he has held since December 2023. A former quarterback at UC Davis, Plough was considered to be one of the rising assistant coaches in college football, having received a "35 under 35" award from the American Football Coaches Association (AFCA) in 2019.

== Playing career ==
Plough was a quarterback at UC Davis from 2003 to 2007, appearing in only 16 games due to a number of injuries he suffered throughout his college career.

== Coaching career ==
Plough began his coaching career at his alma mater, UC Davis, as a student assistant in 2008 before being elevated to quarterbacks coach in 2009. He added the title of passing game coordinator in 2010, and was given offensive play-calling duties at the age of 25. Plough spent three seasons with the Aggies before departing for Northern Arizona in 2013 to be the Lumberjacks' wide receivers coach. He was promoted to offensive coordinator and reassigned to quarterbacks coach in 2015, where the Lumberjacks led the nation in quarterback efficiency as their starter Case Cookus won the STATS FCS Freshman Player of the Year award. Plough left Northern Arizona to return to UC Davis in 2017 as their offensive coordinator and quarterbacks coach, where the Aggies had a top 10 passing offense in all three of the seasons in which Plough was offensive coordinator.

Plough was named the offensive coordinator at Boise State in 2021. Plough was fired from his position on September 24, 2022 by Boise State head coach Andy Avalos. Dirk Koetter replaced him. Plough was hired as a tight end coach at California on December 12, 2022.

On December 1, 2023, Plough was hired by his alma mater, UC Davis, to become their head football coach. In his first season, the Aggies finished 11–3 (including playoffs) with a No. 5 ranking in both FCS polls, their highest finish ever in Division I. In his second season, the Aggies again reached the final 8 of the FCS playoff and finished with a top 10 ranking in both polls, this time No. 8 in both.

== Head coaching record ==
Year	Team	Overall	Conference	Standing	Bowl/playoffs	STATS^{#}	Coaches^{°}
UC Davis Aggies (Big Sky Conference) (2024–present)
2024	UC Davis	11–3	7–1	2nd	L NCAA Division I Quarterfinal	5	5
2025	UC Davis	9–4	6–2	3rd	L NCAA Division I Quarterfinal	8	8
2026	UC Davis	3–1	1–0				
UC Davis:		23–7	14–3				
Total:		21–7					
