= UC Davis Aggies football =

American college football team

2026 UC Davis Aggies football team
- First season: 1915; 111 years ago
- Head coach: Tim Plough; 2nd season, 20–7 (.741)
- Location: Davis, California
- Stadium: UC Davis Health Stadium (capacity: 10,849)
- Field: Jim Sochor Field
- NCAA division: Division I FCS
- Conference: Big Sky
- Colors: Yale blue and gold
- All-time record: 568–446–33 (.558)
- Playoff record: 3–4 (.429)
- Bowl record: 0–5 (.000)

Conference championships
- NCAC: 1929, 1947, 1949, 1951, 1956, 1963, 1971, 1972, 1973, 1974, 1975, 1976, 1977, 1978, 1979, 1980, 1981, 1982, 1983, 1984, 1985, 1986, 1987, 1988, 1989, 1990, 1992 AWC: 1993 Great West: 2005, 2009 Big Sky: 2018
- Rivalries: Cal Poly (rivalry); Sacramento State (rivalry, paused); Nevada; Chico State (defunct); Humboldt State (defunct); San Francisco State (defunct); UCSB (defunct)
- Fight song: Aggie Fight
- Mascot: Gunrock the Mustang
- Marching band: UC Davis Marching Band
- Website: UCDavisAggies.com

The UC Davis Aggies football team represents the University of California, Davis in NCAA Division I Football Championship Subdivision (FCS). The Aggies currently play their home games at UC Davis Health Stadium and are coached by Tim Plough.

== History ==
The football program's first season took place in 1915, and has fielded a team each year since with the exception of 1918 during World War I and from 1943 to 1945 during World War II, when the campus, then known as the University Farm, was shut down. The team was known as the Cal Aggies or California Aggies from 1922 to 1958 when UC Davis was called the Northern Branch of the College of Agriculture.

UC Davis competed as a member of the NCAA College Division through 1972; from 1973 to 2003, the Aggies competed as an NCAA Division II program. In 2004, UC Davis promoted its football program to the Division I FCS (then I-AA) level and joined the Great West Conference (then known as the Great West Football Conference) after one season as an independent team with exploratory status. After their provisional seasons and the construction of a new stadium, UC Davis became a full member of Division I in 2007 and eligible for the postseason.

Throughout its history, the football program won 31 conference championships. Between 1929 and 1992, the Aggies captured 27 outright or shared Northern California Athletic Conference championships, including 20 in a row from 1971 to 1990, an American West Conference title in 1993 (co-champion), GWFC/GWC (Division I-AA/FCS) championships in 2005 (co-champ) and 2009, and a Big Sky title (co-champion) in 2018.

== Conference affiliations ==
UC Davis has been both independent and affiliated with multiple conferences.

- NCAA Independent (1915–1924)
- Northern California Athletic Conference (1925–1992)
  - Far Western Conference (1925–1981)
  - Northern California Athletic Conference (1982–1992)
- American West Conference (1993)
- NCAA Division II independent (1994–2002)
- NCAA Division I-AA independent (2003)
- Great West Football Conference (2004–2011)
- Big Sky Conference (2012–present)

== Conference championships ==
UC Davis Aggies football program has won or shared a total of 31 conference championships since 1915, including 27 from the Northern California Athletic Conference where they won 20 straight conference champions from 1971 to 1990, most notably during that time was the stretch of 58 undefeated home conference games (including the 2004 season).

Year	Coach	Conference	Overall record	Conference record
Pre-NCAA Divisional Classification
1929	Crip Toomey	Far Western Conference	6–2	5–0
1947†	Vern Hickey	Far Western Conference	4–5	3–1
1949	Ted Forbes	Far Western Conference	5–4	4–0
1951	Ted Forbes	Far Western Conference	5–4	2–1
1956†	Will Lotter	Far Western Conference	7–3	4–1
College Division/Division II (Starting in the 1973 season)		Far Western Conference		
1963†	Will Lotter	Far Western Conference	6–2–1	3–1–1
1971†	Jim Sochor	Far Western Conference	9–1	5–1
1972	Jim Sochor	Far Western Conference	6–2–2	5–0
1973†	Jim Sochor	Far Western Conference	7–3	4–1
1974	Jim Sochor	Far Western Conference	9–1	5–0
1975	Jim Sochor	Far Western Conference	7–3	5–0
1976	Jim Sochor	Far Western Conference	8–2	5–0
1977	Jim Sochor	Far Western Conference	11–1	5–0
1978	Jim Sochor	Far Western Conference	8–3	5–0
1979	Jim Sochor	Far Western Conference	6–3–1	5–0
1980	Jim Sochor	Far Western Conference	7–2–1	5–0
1981†	Jim Sochor	Far Western Conference	6–4	4–1
1982	Jim Sochor	Far Western Conference	12–1	5–0
1983	Jim Sochor	Northern California Athletic Conference	11–1	6–0
1984	Jim Sochor	Northern California Athletic Conference	9–2	6–0
1985	Jim Sochor	Northern California Athletic Conference	9–2	5–0
1986	Jim Sochor	Northern California Athletic Conference	10–1	5–0
1987	Jim Sochor	Northern California Athletic Conference	8–2	5–0
1988	Jim Sochor	Northern California Athletic Conference	7–3	5–0
1989	Bob Foster	Northern California Athletic Conference	8–3	5–0
1990	Bob Foster	Northern California Athletic Conference	7–3	5–0
1992	Bob Foster	Northern California Athletic Conference	8–2–1	5–0
1993†	Bob Biggs	American West Conference	10–2	3–1
Division I-AA
2005†	Bob Biggs	Great West Football Conference	6–5	4–1
2009	Bob Biggs	Great West Football Conference	6–5	3–1
2018†	Dan Hawkins	Big Sky Conference	10–3	7–1

† Co-champion

== Postseason appearances ==
=== NCAA Division I-AA/FCS ===
(2018–present)

The Aggies have made four appearances in the NCAA Division I-AA/FCS playoffs since becoming eligible in 2007, with a combined record of 3–4. Davis, for the first time since 2002, made the playoffs for consecutive seasons since becoming a full Division I program in the 2024 and 2025 seasons. Both seasons ended in the quarterfinals.

Year	Round	Opponent	Result
Division I (postseason playoffs with 24-team bracket)
2018	Second Round; Quarterfinals	Northern Iowa; Eastern Washington	W, 23–16; L, 29–34
2021	First Round	South Dakota State	L, 24–56
2024	Second Round; Quarterfinals	Illinois State; South Dakota	W, 42–10; L, 21–35
2025	Second Round; Quarterfinals	Rhode Island; Illinois State	W, 47–26; L, 31–42

=== NCAA Division II ===
(1972–2002)

The Aggies made 18 appearances in the NCAA Division II playoffs from 1977 to 2002. Their combined record was 15–18. Notable appearances are the 1977, 1982, 1983, 1986, 1993, 1998, 1999, 2000, and 2001 seasons where UC Davis posted 10+ winning seasons, including an appearance in the Division II National Championship game in 1982.

Year	Result	Round	Opponent	Score
College Division (rankings via AP writers poll)
1972	Unranked	Regional Semifinal (Boardwalk Bowl)	UMass	L, 14–35
Division II (postseason playoffs with 8-team bracket)
1977	3rd Place	Quarterfinal; Semifinal (Knute Rockne Bowl)	Bethune–Cookman; Lehigh	W, 34–16; L, 30–39
1978		Quarterfinal	Eastern Illinois	L, 31–35
1982	Runner Up	Quarterfinal; Semifinal; Final (Palm Bowl)	Northern Michigan; North Dakota State; Southwest Texas State	W, 42–21; W, 19–14; L, 9–34
1983	3rd Place	Quarterfinal; Semifinal	Butler; North Dakota State	W, 25–6; L, 17–26
1984		Quarterfinal	North Dakota State	L, 23–31
1985		Quarterfinal	North Dakota State	L, 12–31
1986		Quarterfinal	South Dakota	L, 23–26
Division II (postseason playoffs with 16-team bracket)
1988		First Round	Sacramento State	L, 14–35
1989		First Round	Angelo State	L, 23–28
1992		First Round	Portland State	L, 28–42
1993		First Round; Quarterfinals	Fort Hays State; Texas A&M–Kingsville	W, 37–34; L, 28–51
1996	3rd Place	First Round; Quarterfinals; Semifinals	Texas A&M–Kingsville; Central Oklahoma; Carson–Newman	W, 17–14; W, 26–7; L, 26–29
1997	3rd Place	First Round; Quarterfinals; Semifinals	Texas A&M–Kingsville; Angelo State; New Haven	W, 37–33; W, 50–33; L, 25–27
1998		First Round	Texas A&M–Kingsville	L, 21–54
1999		First Round; Quarterfinals	Central Oklahoma; Northeastern State	W, 33–17; L, 14–19
2000	3rd Place	First Round; Quarterfinals; Semifinals	Chadron State; Mesa State; Bloomsburg	W 48–10; W 62–18; L, 48–58
2001	3rd Place	First Round; Quarterfinals; Semifinals	Texas A&M–Kingsville; Tarleton State; North Dakota	W, 37–32; W, 42–25; L, 2–14
2002		First Round; Quarterfinals	Central Washington; Texas A&M–Kingsville	W, 24–6; L, 20–27 ^{OT}

== Bowl games ==
Bowl	Date	Opponent	Result
Pear Bowl	November 24, 1949	Pacific University (OR)	L, 15–33
Pear Bowl	November 24, 1951	Pacific University (OR)	L, 7–25
Boardwalk Bowl	December 9, 1972	UMass	L, 14–35
Knute Rockne Bowl (NCAA Division II Semifinal)	December 3, 1977	Lehigh	L, 30–39
Palm Bowl (NCAA Division II Championship)	December 11, 1982	Southwest Texas State	L, 9–34

== Home stadiums ==
- 1915–1924

Various fields in Davis, California and Sacramento, California

- 1925–1927

Moreing Field, Sacramento

- 1928–1931

Sacramento Stadium, East Sacramento
Capacity (20,000)

The stadium opened in 1928 and was initially known as Sacramento Stadium and Sacramento College Stadium. It is now known as Charles C. Hughes Stadium and commonly referred to as Hughes Stadium.

- 1932–1948

A Street Field, Davis

- 1949–2006

Toomey Field, unincorporated Yolo County, California
Capacity (12,800)

Toomey Field is located on the campus of the University of California, Davis in unincorporated Yolo County, California. The Woody Wilson Track is located in the stadium and it is home to the UC Davis Aggies track and field team. At the northeast corner of campus, Aggie Field opened in 1949 and was home to the Aggies' football team through 2006. The first game, on November 18, was a 12–3 victory over Chico State. The record for attendance at the stadium was set on November 12, 1977, with 12,800 for a 37–21 victory over Nevada. The Aggies' all-time record at Toomey Field was 192–86–7 (.686). The stadium was renamed in 1962 in honor of Crip Toomey, who served as athletic director at UC Davis from 1928 until his death in 1961. Toomey graduated from UC Davis in 1923 and also served as the Aggies' basketball coach and football coach from 1928 to 1936. The natural grass playing field (now track infield) was aligned north-northwest to south-southeast at an approximate elevation of fifty feet (15 m) above sea level.

- 2007–present

UC Davis Health Stadium, unincorporated Yolo County
Capacity (10,743)

UC Davis Health Stadium is a 10,743-seat multi-purpose stadium located on the campus of the University of California, Davis. Opened as Aggie Stadium on April 1, 2007, it replaced Toomey Field and is the home to the UC Davis Aggies football and women's lacrosse teams. Plans call for the stadium to eventually be built out to 30,000 seats.

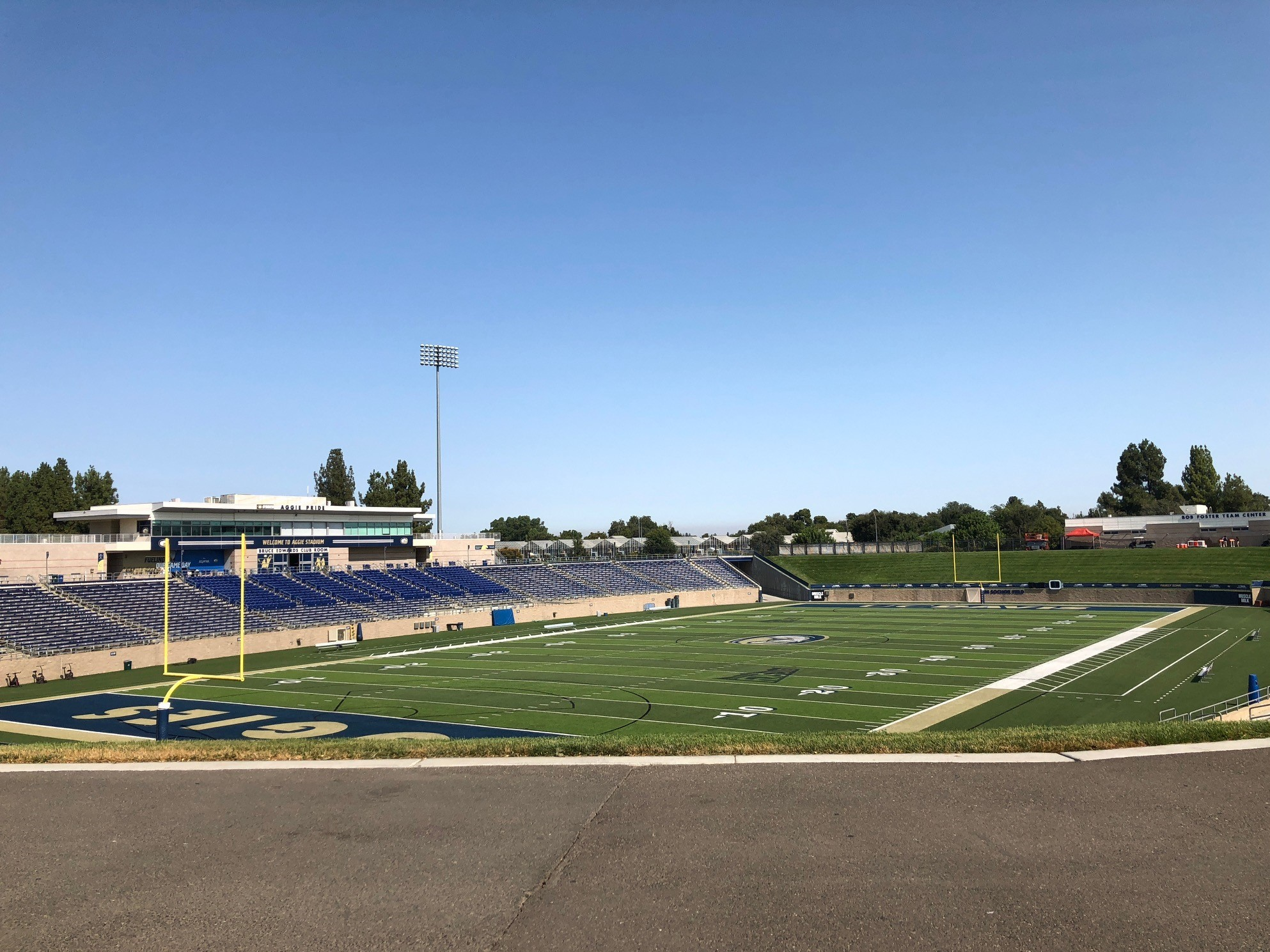
Aggie Stadium

The artificial turf playing field is named Jim Sochor Field, after their College Football Hall of Fame coach. It is aligned north-south at an approximate elevation of 55 feet (17 m) above sea level.

The stadium was known as Aggie Stadium from 2007 to 2018. As part of a partnership with the UC Davis Health System, announced at the Causeway Classic Luncheon on November 15, 2018, the facility was renamed UC Davis Health Stadium on August 1, 2019, for a period of 20 years. Along with this development, announced with plans for a 38,000-square-foot (3,500 m^{2}) student-athlete performance center and practice field, and 16,000 square feet (1,500 m^{2}) of the Bob Foster Team Center, located behind the north end zone, will be renovated. The previous venue, Toomey Field, continues as the home of the Aggies' track and field teams. The Tavernetti Bell, also known as the "Victory Bell", greets fans entering Aggie Stadium. The bell is named after Thomas Tavernetti (1889–1934) and is rung once for every point scored after an Aggie victory. With the construction of Aggie Stadium, the bell followed from its previous location at Toomey Field.

== Rivalries ==
=== Sacramento State ===
The Causeway Classic

The Sacramento State Hornets are the natural cross-town rival who battle UC Davis annually for the Causeway Trophy. This rivalry is known as the Causeway Classic. UC Davis leads the all-time series 49–23. Sacramento State announced that they would join the Mid-American Conference of the FBS beginning in the 2026 season. There are currently no future meetings scheduled.

=== Cal Poly ===
Battle for the Golden Horseshoe

The Cal Poly Mustangs are another rival; these teams compete in the Battle for the Golden Horseshoe each year with the winner receiving a trophy of a large golden horseshoe. UC Davis leads the all-time series 29–20–2.

=== Stanford ===
UC Davis also has a smaller rivalry with the Stanford Cardinal following UC Davis' 20–17 upset victory in 2005 while still a provisional Division I team.

=== Nevada ===
The Aggie–Pack Battle

UC Davis and Nevada have not played each other since 2013, but have a historical rivalry dating back to the first match up in 1915 when the University Farm School Aggies beat the Nevada Sagebrushers 14–0 in Carson City, Nevada. They have played each other 54 times since. The "Aggie–Pack" battle would regularly have old-fashioned rooters buses travel 146 miles (2.5 hours) down I-80 for this rivalry that was regularly "a battle for West Coast small-college supremacy … in fact, the mid-November 1977 Nevada–UCD matchup drew 12,800 fans to Toomey Field, which still stands as a home attendance record … and yes, the crowd-pleasing Aggies prevailed, 37–21 …" Nevada currently leads the all-time series 29–21–3.

=== Chico State ===
A most heated Northern California small-college rivalry That started in 1922 with 69 meetings between the two schools until 1997 when Chico State discontinued its football program. UC Davis won the series 46–20–3. Both programs were vying for Far Western Conference and Northern California Athletic Conference championships every year for decades. From 1970 to 1997, UC Davis and Chico State won or shared 25 of 27 FWC/NCAC titles.

=== Humboldt State ===
The Humboldt State Lumberjacks and Aggies first met in 1935 in Eureka, CA and last met in 2011 and were rivals in the Far Western Conference and Northern California Athletic Conference and played each other 60 times. The Aggies won the series 41–16–3. Humboldt State discontinued their football program in 2018.

=== San Francisco State ===
The San Francisco State Gators and Aggies first met in 1937 in San Francisco, CA, a 13–7 win by the Northern Branch Cal Aggies and last met in 1994 just before San Francisco State discontinued their football program in 1995. The 'Staters'/'Golden Gaters'/'Gators' and Aggies were rivals in the Far Western Conference and Northern California Athletic Conference and played each other 51 times. The Aggies won the series 33–17–1. From 1954 to 1967 UC Davis and San Francisco State combined won 10 of 15 Far Western Conference titles.

== Notable games ==
On November 6, 1971, UC Davis defeated Cal State Hayward 30–29, where UC Davis scored 16 points in the final 44 seconds and was dubbed the "Miracle Game." After scoring on a five-play drive that included a two-point conversion with 20 seconds remaining, UC Davis recovered an onside kick. On the final play of the game, quarterback and future UC Davis head coach Bob Biggs found tight end Mike Bellotti for a 29-yard touchdown on the final play of the game with four seconds remaining. Instead of tying the score with the extra point, head coach Jim Sochor went for the win and another two-point conversion. After two false starts, Biggs completed a pass to Mike Everly to complete the comeback.

The Aggies defeated the Stanford Cardinal 20–17 on September 18, 2005, after trailing 17–0 midway through the second quarter. Stanford quarterback Trent Edwards then left the game with an injury. The Aggies scored 20 unanswered and became the first non-Division I-A/FBS team to defeat the Cardinal. The win was the Aggies' first over a Division I-A team since 1986 against the Pacific Tigers and was the first against a Pac-10 team in 65 years.

On October 4, 2008, Bakari Grant caught a 38-yard Hail Mary touchdown pass from Greg Denham against the Northern Colorado Bears to win 34–30. The game was dubbed the "Hail Bakari" at the time.

== College Football Hall of Fame inductees ==
The Aggies have two coaches inducted into the College Football Hall of Fame, and one player.

Ken O'Brien, made Division II All-America in 1982. He led the 1982 UC Davis Aggies football team to a 10-0 record in the regular season. In the NCAA playoffs, the Aggies beat Northern Michigan 42-21 and North Dakota State 19-14 before losing in the championship game to Southwest Texas State 34-9.

Sochor became the head coach at UC Davis in 1970 after being an assistant coach since 1967. He had a streak of 18 consecutive conference championships, from 1971 to 1988 (15 outright, three shared). The only other college football program in NCAA history at any division level with a longer streak has been Mount Union College. His overall record between 1970 and 1988 was 156–41–5, a winning percentage of .785. In conference games under Sochor, the UC Davis Aggies were 92–5. He had winning streaks of 41 and 38 in-conference games. His Aggies were the final poll leaders at the end of the regular season in 1983 and 1985.

He was named national coach of the year in NCAA Division II in 1983. He was also a mentor to several future head coaches including Dan Hawkins, Paul Hackett, Mike Bellotti, Chris Petersen, Gary Patterson, Mike Moroski and Bob Biggs.

Sochor led the Aggies to 3 of their 5 Bowl games, the 1982 Palm Bowl in McAllen, Texas for the NCAA Division II national football championship against the Jim Wacker-led Southwest Texas State, 1977 Knute Rockne Bowl for the 1977 NCAA Division II football season semifinal, and the 1972 Boardwalk Bowl. He also lead them to the 1983 Division II Semifinal.

In 1973, Mike Bellotti started his career in football coaching at his alma mater as an assistant coach under College Football Hall of Fame coach Jim Sochor.

College Football Hall of Fame
Name	Position	Year	Inducted	Ref
Ken O'Brien	QB	1979-1982	1997	
Jim Sochor	Head Coach	1967-1991	1999	
Mike Bellotti	Assistant Coach	1973-1976	2014	

== All-Americans ==
The list below covers UC Davis All-Americans since the 2003 season when the program joined the FCS as an independent with exploratory status. This list mentions eight total selectors, the Associated Press (AP), STATS FCS (once they began coverage in 2015), HERO sports (once they began coverage in 2016 and stopped in 2023), The Sports Network (TSN, who began FCS coverage in 2006 and stopped in 2014), FCS Football Central on SI (All-American selections starting in 2023), the American Football Coaches Association (AFCA), the Athletic Directors Association (ADA), the Phil Steele Selectors, and the Walter Camp Selectors.

This list is in progress and currently only mentions First Team All-Americans.

Year	Player	Position	First team	Second team	Third team
2006	Jonathan Farsi	FS	AP	—	—
2008	Jonathan Faletoese	DT	AP, TSN, WC	—	—
2009	Mike Morales	LB	AP	—	—
2010	Dean Rogers	TE	AFCA	—	—
2017	Keelan Doss	WR	Consensus	—	—
2018	Keelan Doss	WR	Consensus	—	—
2018	Jake Maier	QB	PS	—	—
2020*	Daniel Whelan	P	Stats, AFCA, HERO	—	—
2023	Lan Larison	RB	FCS Football Central	—	—
2024	Rex Connors	DB	AP, AFCA, FCS Football Central, Stats	—	—
2024	David Meyer	LB	WC, AFCA, FCS Football Central, Stats	—	—
2024	Lan Larison	RB	AP, AFCA, FCS Football Central, Stats	—	—
2024	Miles Hastings	QB	FCS Football Central, Stats	—	—
Key: * First team; ^{†} Second team; ^{‡} Third team. For expansions of abbreviations see the glossary. *Played in 2021 due to COVID-19

== National award winners ==
- Eddie Robinson Award

Eddie Robinson Award
Year	Name	Position
2018	Dan Hawkins	Coach

The Eddie Robinson Award is awarded annually to college football's top head coach in the NCAA Division I Football Championship Subdivision (formerly Division I-AA). It was established in 1987.

- AFCA Assistant Coach of the Year

AFCA Assistant Coach of the Year
Year	Name	Position	Division
1999	Mike Moroski	Assistant Coach	Division II

- National Football Foundation Scholar-Athlete of the Year Award

NFF Scholar-Athlete of the Year Award
Year	Name	Position
1989	James Tomasin	
1991	Michael Shepard	

== Notable players ==
- Nick Aliotti, college coach
- Jeff Allen, NFL defensive back
- Scott Barry, NFL quarterback
- Mike Bellotti, college coach and analyst
- Rolf Benirschke, NFL placekicker and TV host
- Bob Biggs, CFL quarterback and college coach
- Teddye Buchanan, NFL linebacker
- Chris Carter, NFL wide receiver
- Kevin Daft, NFL quarterback and college coach
- Keelan Doss, NFL wide receiver
- Bo Eason, NFL defensive back (second-round draft pick) and actor
- Daniel Fells, NFL tight end
- Bob Foster, college coach
- Bakari Grant, CFL wide receiver
- Mark Grieb, AFL quarterback and college coach
- Nathaniel Hackett, college and NFL coach
- Paul Hackett, college and NFL coach
- Dan Hawkins, college coach, former UC Davis head coach
- Khari Jones, CFL quarterback and coach
- Joshua Kelley, NFL running back (later transferred to UCLA)
- Tim Lajcik, mixed martial artist
- Bryan Lee-Lauduski, Arena Football League player
- Chris Mandeville, NFL defensive back
- Rich Martini, NFL wide receiver
- Casey Merrill, NFL defensive end
- Mike Moroski, first NFL player from UC Davis, playing as quarterback. Also a college coach
- Ken O'Brien, NFL quarterback (first-round draft pick)
- J. T. O'Sullivan, NFL quarterback
- Michael Oliva, NFL wide receiver
- Chris Petersen, college coach
- Colton Schmidt, NFL/AAF/XFL punter
- John Shoemaker, NFL wide receiver
- Elliot Vallejo, NFL offensive tackle
- Forest Vance, NFL offensive tackle and personal trainer
- Colby Wadman, NFL punter
- Tom Williams, NFL defensive end
- Mike Wise, NFL defensive end

== Future non-conference opponents ==
Announced schedules as of August 5, 2026.

2026	2027	2028	2029	2031
at San Diego	at UCLA	at Washington State	at UCLA	Harvard
at SMU	San Diego		San Diego	
Stetson	at Harvard			
