= Bob Biggs =

American football player and coach (born 1951)

Biographical details
- Born: February 20, 1951 (age 75); San Diego County, California, U.S.

Playing career
- 1970–1972: UC Davis
- 1973: Winnipeg Blue Bombers
- Position: Quarterback

Coaching career (HC unless noted)
- 1978–1986: UC Davis (assistant)
- 1987–1992: UC Davis (OC)
- 1993–2012: UC Davis

Head coaching record
- Overall: 144–85–1
- Tournaments: 11–8 (NCAA D-II playoffs)

Accomplishments and honors

Championships
- 1 AWC (1993); 2 GWC (2005, 2009)

Awards
- As a player: First-team Little All-American (1972); As a coach: Great West Coach of the Year (2009)

George Robert Biggs (born February 20, 1951) is an American former college football coach and player. He played college football for UC Davis and was selected by the Associated Press as the first-team quarterback on the 1972 Little All-America college football team. He served as the head football coach at the University of California, Davis from 1993 to 2012, compiling a career record of 144–85–1. He was named the 2009 Great West Conference Coach of the Year.

== Head coaching record ==
Year	Team	Overall	Conference	Standing	Bowl/playoffs
UC Davis Aggies (American West Conference) (1993)
1993	UC Davis	10–2	3–1	1st	L NCAA Division II Quarterfinal
UC Davis Aggies (NCAA Division II Independent) (1994–2003)
1994	UC Davis	6–4			
1995	UC Davis	6–3–1			
1996	UC Davis	8–5			L NCAA Division II Semifinal
1997	UC Davis	9–5			L NCAA Division II Semifinal
1998	UC Davis	10–2			L NCAA Division II First Round
1999	UC Davis	10–2			L NCAA Division II Quarterfinal
2000	UC Davis	12–1			L NCAA Division II Semifinal
2001	UC Davis	10–3			L NCAA Division II Semifinal
2002	UC Davis	9–3			L NCAA Division II Quarterfinal
2003	UC Davis	6–4			
UC Davis Aggies (Great West Conference) (2004–2011)
2004	UC Davis	6–4	3–2	2nd	
2005	UC Davis	6–5	4–1	T–1st	
2006	UC Davis	6–5	2–3	4th	
2007	UC Davis	5–6	1–3	4th	
2008	UC Davis	5–7	2–1	2nd	
2009	UC Davis	6–5	3–1	1st	
2010	UC Davis	6–5	3–1	2nd	
2011	UC Davis	4–7	1–3	T–4th	
UC Davis Aggies (Big Sky Conference) (2012)
2012	UC Davis	4–7	3–5	T–8th	
UC Davis:		144–85–1	25–21		
Total:		144–85–1			
National championship Conference title Conference division title or championship game berth
