= 1987 NCAA Division II football rankings =

The 1987 NCAA Division II football rankings are from the NCAA Division II football committee. This is for the 1987 season.

== Legend ==
	Increase in ranking
	Decrease in ranking
	Not ranked previous week
(#–#)	Win–loss record
(Italics)	Number of first place votes
т	Tied with team above or below also with this symbol

== NCAA Division II Football Committee poll ==
	Preseason	Week 1 Sept 8 (Note: The only poll currently available for Sept 8 is a "Top 10". The other filled-in rankings are from the "previous" column of the Sept 15 poll.)	Week 2 Sept 15	Week 3 Sept 22	Week 4 Sept 29	Week 5 Oct 6	Week 6 Oct 13	Week 7 Oct 20	Week 8 Oct 27	Week 9 Nov 3	Week 10 Nov 10	Week 11 Nov 17	
1.	North Dakota State (4)	North Dakota State (0–0) (4)	South Dakota (2–0) (4)	South Dakota (3–0) (4)	South Dakota (4–0) (4)	South Dakota (5–0) (4)	South Dakota (6–0) (4)	Northern Michigan (7–0) (4)	Northern Michigan (8–0) (4)	Northern Michigan (9–0) (4)	Texas A&I (8–1) (4)	Texas A&I (9–1) (4)	1.
2.	South Dakota	South Dakota (1–0)	Texas A&I (2–0)	UCF (2–0)	Northern Michigan (4–0)	Northern Michigan (5–0)	Northern Michigan (6–0)	Texas A&I (5–1)	Texas A&I (6–1)	Texas A&I (7–1)	West Chester (9–1)	West Chester (9–1)	2.
3.	Troy State	Texas A&I (1–0)	UCF (1–0)	Northern Michigan (3–0)	Portland State (3–1) т	Texas A&I (3–1)	Texas A&I (4–1)	West Chester (6–1)	West Chester (7–1)	West Chester (8–1)	Portland State (8–1–1)	Portland State (9–1–1)	3.
4.	Texas A&I	UC Davis (0–0)	West Chester (2–0)	Albany State (2–0)	Texas A&I (2–1) т	Portland State (4–1)	West Chester (5–1)	Portland State (5–1–1)	Portland State (6–1–1)	Portland State (7–1–1)	Troy State (8–1–1)	Troy State (9–1–1)	4.
5.	UC Davis (Note: In the actual printed polls, UC Davis was listed as California Davis)	UCF (1–0)	Northern Michigan (2–0)	Texas A&I (2–1)	West Chester (3–1) т	West Chester (4–1)	Portland State (4–1–1)	Tuskegee (6–0)	Eastern New Mexico (8–0)	Eastern New Mexico (9–0)	UCF (7–2)	Northern Michigan (9–1)	5.
6.	IUP (Note: In the actual printed polls, IUP was listed as Indiana (PA))	West Chester (1–0)	Portland State (2–0)	Portland State (2–1) т	North Dakota State (2–1)	North Dakota State (3–1)	North Dakota State (4–1)	Eastern New Mexico (7–0)	Troy State (6–1–1)	Troy State (7–1–1)	Northern Michigan (9–1)	IUP (9–1)	6.
7.	Albany State	Portland State (1–0)	UC Davis (0–0)	West Chester (2–1) т	Valdosta State (3–0)	Valdosta State (4–0)	Tuskegee (5–0)	North Alabama (6–0)	IUP (6–1)	IUP (7–1)	IUP (8–1)	Mankato State (9–2)	7.
8.	Grand Valley State	Albany State (1–0)	Albany State (1–0)	North Dakota State (1–1)	UCF (2–1)	Millersville (4–0)	Eastern New Mexico (6–0)	Cal Poly (6–0)	North Alabama (6–0–1)	UCF (6–2)	Mankato State (8–2)	Butler (8–1–1)	8.
9.	Portland State	Ashland (0–0)	South Dakota State (1–0)	Valdosta State (2–0)	Millersville (3–0)	Tuskegee (4–0)	North Alabama (5–0)	IUP (5–1)	Santa Clara (6–1)	Mankato State (7–2)	Eastern New Mexico (9–1)	Angelo State (7–2)	9.
10.	UCF	New Haven (0–0)	North Dakota State (0–1)	Ashland (2–0)	Jacksonville State (3–0)	Eastern New Mexico (5–0)	IUP (4–1)	South Dakota (6–1)	New Haven (6–1)	New Haven (7–1)	New Haven (8–1)	UC Davis (7–2)	10.
11.	West Chester	South Dakota State	Ashland (1–0) т	Millersville (2–0)	Tuskegee (4–0)	IUP (3–1)	Cal Poly (5–0)	Troy State (5–1–1)	UCF (5–2) т	Winston–Salem State (7–1)	Tuskegee (8–1)	UCF (7–3)	11.
12.	Ashland	Valdosta State	Valdosta State (1–0) т	Jacksonville State (2–0)	UC Davis (1–1)	North Alabama (4–0)	Troy State (4–1–1)	New Haven (5–1)	Mankato State (6–2) т	Butler (6–1–1)	Butler (7–1–1)	Winston–Salem State (8–2)	12.
13.	Valdosta State	Northern Michigan	Millersville (1–0)	Santa Clara (2–0)	Eastern New Mexico (4–0)	Cal Poly (4–0)	New Haven (4–1)	UCF (4–2)	Butler (5–1–1)	Tuskegee (7–1)	Angelo State (6–2)	Eastern New Mexico (9–2)	13.
14.	New Haven	Southeast Missouri State	Jacksonville State (2–0)	Grand Valley State (2–1)	IUP (2–1)	Mankato State (4–1) т	Fort Valley State (3–1)	Santa Clara (5–1)	Cal Poly (6–1)	South Dakota (7–2)	UC Davis (6–2)	Bloomsburg (8–3)	14.
15.	Central Missouri State		Southeast Missouri State (1–1)	Tuskegee (3–0)	North Alabama (3–0)	New Haven (3–1) т	Angelo State (4–1)	North Dakota State (5–1)	Winston–Salem State (6–1)	Valdosta State (6–2)	Winston–Salem State (7–2)	Hampton (9–2)	15.
16.	South Dakota State		Southern Utah State (2–0)	Eastern New Mexico (3–0)	Delta State (3–0)	Fort Valley State (3–1)	Ashland (4–1)	Mankato State (5–2)	Tuskegee (6–1)	Clarion (6–2)	Clarion (7–2)	New Haven (8–2)	16.
17.	Abilene Christian		Grand Valley State (1–1)	IUP (1–1) т	New Haven (2–1)	Ashland (3–1)	UCF (3–2)	Ashland (4–1–1)	North Dakota State (5–2)	Cal State Northridge (6–2) (Note: In the actual printed polls, Cal State Northridge was listed as Northridge State)	Cal Poly (6–2)	Ashland (7–2–1)	17.
18.	Fort Valley State		Tuskegee (2–0)	North Alabama (3–0) т	Ashland (2–1) т	Troy State (3–1–1)	Grand Valley State (4–2)	Butler (4–1–1)	Clarion (5–2) т	Angelo State (6–2)	Virginia State (8–1)	Alabama A&M (7–3)	18.
19.	Millersville	Millersville	East Stroudsburg (1–0)	North Dakota (2–0) т	Cal Poly (3–0) т (Note: In the actual printed polls, Cal Poly was listed as Cal Poly San Luis Obispo)	Clarion (3–1)	Santa Clara (4–1)	Winston–Salem State (5–1)	Valdosta State (5–1) т	Santa Clara (6–2)	Cal State Northridge (6–3)	Minnesota–Duluth (7–3)	19.
20.	West Texas State		Nebraska–Omaha (2–0)	Delta State (2–0)	Mankato State (3–0)	Angelo State (3–1) т	Butler (4–1) т	Bloomsburg (5–2)	Angelo State (5–2)	North Alabama (6–1–1)	Bloomsburg (7–3) т	Tuskegee (8–2)	20.
21.						Butler (3–1) т	Mansfield (4–1) т				Valdosta State (6–2) т		21.
22.						Santa Clara (3–1) т							22.
	Preseason	Week 1 Sept 8 (Note: The only poll currently available for Sept 8 is a "Top 10". The other filled-in rankings are from the "previous" column of the Sept 15 poll.)	Week 2 Sept 15	Week 3 Sept 22	Week 4 Sept 29	Week 5 Oct 6	Week 6 Oct 13	Week 7 Oct 20	Week 8 Oct 27	Week 9 Nov 3	Week 10 Nov 10	Week 11 Nov 17	
		Dropped: 3 Troy State; 6 IUP; 8 Grand Valley State; 15 Central Missouri State; 17 Abilene Christian; 18 Fort Valley State; 20 West Texas State	Dropped: 10 New Haven	Dropped: 7 UC Davis; 9 South Dakota State; 15 Southeast Missouri State; 16 Southern Utah State; 19 East Stroudsburg; 20 Nebraska–Omaha	Dropped: 4 Albany State; 13 Santa Clara; 14 Grand Valley State; 19 North Dakota	Dropped: 8 UCF; 10 Jacksonville State; 12 UC Davis; 16 Delta State	Dropped: 7 Valdosta State; 8 Millersville; 14 Mankato State; 19 Clarion	Dropped: 14 Fort Valley State; 15 Angelo State; 18 Grand Valley State; 20 Mansfield	Dropped: 10 South Dakota; 17 Ashland; 20 Bloomsburg	Dropped: 14 Cal Poly; 17 North Dakota State	Dropped: 14 South Dakota; 19 Santa Clara; 20 North Alabama	Dropped: 16 Clarion; 17 Cal Poly; 18 Virginia State; 19 Cal State Northridge; 20 Valdosta State	
