= 1982 Little All-America college football team =

American college football all-star team

The 1982 Little All-America college football team is composed of college football players from small colleges and universities who were selected by the Associated Press (AP) as the best players at each position. This would be the first year to that did not include NCAA Division I-AA schools in the Little All-America team.

== First team ==
Position	Player	Team
Offense
Quarterback	Ed Lett	Jacksonville State
Running back	Alonzo Patterson	Wagner
Running back	Scott Reppert	Lawrence
Wide receiver	Mike Bos	Puget Sound
Wide receiver	Cedric Mack	Northeastern Oklahoma
Tight end	Mike Blake	Bloomsburg
Tackle	Pat Hauser	Cal State Northridge
Tackle	Gary Hoffman	Santa Clara
Guard	Cliff Carmody	North Dakota State
Guard	Gary Birkholz	Minnesota–Duluth
Center	Grant Feasel	Abilene Christian
Defense
Defensive end	Dan Beauford	Johnson C. Smith
Defensive end	Ron Gladnick	Hillsdale
Defensive tackle	Charles Martin	Livingston
Defensive tackle	John Walker	Nebraska–Omaha
Middle guard	David Rush	Humboldt State
Linebacker	Steve Garske	North Dakota State
Linebacker	Richard Lockman	Southwestern Oklahoma
Linebacker	Tim Staskus	Southwest Texas
Defensive back	William Dillon	Virginia Union
Defensive back	Darrell Green	Texas A&I
Defensive back	Mike Marshall	Southern Connecticut
Special Teams
Kicker	Kevin Jelden	Northern Colorado
Punter	Sean Landeta	Towson State

== See also ==
- 1982 College Football All-America Team
