= 1982 Cal Poly Mustangs football team =

American college football season

1982 Cal Poly Mustangs football

WFC champion
- Conference: Western Football Conference
- Record: 6–5 (4–0 WFC)
- Head coach: Jim Sanderson (1st season)
- Home stadium: Mustang Stadium

1982 Western Football Conference standings
	Conf.					Overall
Team	W		L		T	W		L		T
Cal Poly $	4	–	0	–	0	6	–	5	–	0
Santa Clara	3	–	1	–	0	7	–	4	–	0
Cal State Northridge	2	–	2	–	0	4	–	7	–	0
Cal Poly Pomona	1	–	3	–	0	1	–	10	–	0
Portland State	0	–	4	–	0	2	–	9	–	0
$ – Conference champion

The 1982 Cal Poly Mustangs football team represented California Polytechnic State University, San Luis Obispo as a member of the Western Football Conference (WFC) during the 1982 NCAA Division II football season. Led by first-year head coach Jim Sanderson, Cal Poly compiled an overall record of 6–5 with a mark of 4–0 in conference play, winning the WFC title. The Mustangs played home games at Mustang Stadium in San Luis Obispo, California.

1982 was the first season for the Western Football Conference. In its initial season, the WFC had five teams. Three of them were the final members of the California Collegiate Athletic Association (CCAA): Cal State Northridge, Cal Poly Pomona, and Cal Poly. They were joined by Santa Clara and Portland State.

== Schedule ==
Date	Opponent	Site	Result	Attendance	Source
September 11	at Fresno State*	Bulldog Stadium; Fresno, CA	L 6–26	26,274	
September 18	Cal State Fullerton*	Mustang Stadium; San Luis Obispo, CA	L 10–14	5,542	
September 25	at Idaho State*	ASISU Minidome; Pocatello, ID	W 15–13	10,247	
October 2	at Portland State	Civic Stadium; Portland, OR	W 22–0	1,509–2,825	
October 9	at UC Davis*	Toomey Field; Davis, CA (rivalry)	L 0–24	9,500–9,750	
October 16	No. 5 Northern Colorado*	Mustang Stadium; San Luis Obispo, CA	L 13–14	4,904	
October 23	Simon Fraser*	Mustang Stadium; San Luis Obispo, CA	W 34–0	3,947	
October 30	at No. 6 Santa Clara	Buck Shaw Stadium; Santa Clara, CA	W 20–3	7,125	
November 6	Boise State*	Mustang Stadium; San Luis Obispo, CA	L 24–26	4,554	
November 13	at Cal State Northridge	Devonshire Downs; Northridge, CA	W 24–14	5,483	
November 20	Cal Poly Pomona	Kellogg Field; Pomona, CA	W 31–6	2,967	
*Non-conference game; Rankings from NCAA Division II Football Committee Poll released prior to the game
