= 1982 Cal Poly Pomona Broncos football team =

American college football season

1982 Cal Poly Pomona Broncos football
- Conference: Western Football Conference
- Record: 1–10 (1–3 WFC)
- Head coach: Roman Gabriel (3rd season)
- Home stadium: Kellogg Field

1982 Western Football Conference standings
	Conf.					Overall
Team	W		L		T	W		L		T
Cal Poly $	4	–	0	–	0	6	–	5	–	0
Santa Clara	3	–	1	–	0	7	–	4	–	0
Cal State Northridge	2	–	2	–	0	4	–	7	–	0
Cal Poly Pomona	1	–	3	–	0	1	–	10	–	0
Portland State	0	–	4	–	0	2	–	9	–	0
$ – Conference champion

The 1982 Cal Poly Pomona Broncos football team represented California State Polytechnic University, Pomona as a member of the Western Football Conference (WFC) during the 1982 NCAA Division II football season. Led by third-year head coach Roman Gabriel, Cal Poly Pomona compiled an overall record of 1–10 with a mark of 1–3 in conference play, placing fourth in the WFC. The team was outscored by its opponents 322 to 138 for the season. The Broncos played home games at Kellogg Field in Pomona, California.

1982 was the first season for the Western Football Conference. Three of the WFC's five teams has been members of California Collegiate Athletic Association (CCAA) the previous season: Cal State Northridge, Cal Poly Pomona, and Cal Poly. They were joined by Santa Clara and Portland State, both of which had been independents.

On December 1, 1982, Cal Poly Pomona announced that they were discontinuing their football program due to financial concerns. In its 36 years of play, from 1947 to 1982, the Cal Poly Pomona Broncos football program compiled an overall record of 143–190–9.

== Schedule ==
Date	Opponent	Site	Result	Attendance	Source
September 11	at Puget Sound*	Baker Stadium; Tacoma, WA	L 10–31	1,800	
September 18	Sacramento State*	Kellogg Field; Pomona, CA	L 14–16	1,491	
September 25	UC Davis*	Kellogg Field; Pomona, CA	L 7–37	2,362	
October 2	at Eastern Washington*	Woodward Field; Cheney, WA	L 7–47	1,800–2,500	
October 9	Cal Lutheran*	Kellogg Field; Pomona, CA	L 9–51	2,821	
October 16	at Cal State Hayward*	Pioneer Stadium; Hayward, CA	L 17–28	300	
October 23	No. T–10 Santa Clara	Kellogg Field; Pomona, CA	L 14–19	2,468	
October 30	at San Diego*	Torero Stadium; San Diego, CA	L 7–24	2,000	
November 6	at Cal State Northridge	Devonshire Downs; Northridge, CA	L 30–38	4,710	
November 13	Portland State	Kellogg Field; Pomona, CA	W 17–0	1,141	
November 20	Cal Poly	Kellogg Field; Pomona, CA	L 6–31	2,967	
*Non-conference game; Rankings from NCAA Division II Football Committee Poll released prior to the game

== Team players in the NFL ==
While no Cal Poly Pomona players were selected in the 1983 NFL draft, several players transferred to other college as a result of the disbanding of the Cal Poly Pomona football program. The following competed at Cal Poly Pomona in 1982, transferred to another school, then were drafted by the NFL.

Player	Position	Round	Overall	NFL team
Ron Hall	Tight end	4	87	1987 Tampa Bay Buccaneers
Al Smith	Linebacker	6	147	1987 Houston Oilers
David Grayson	Linebacker	8	217	1987 San Francisco 49ers

The following finished their Cal Poly Pomona career in 1982, were not drafted, but played in the NFL.

Player	Position	First NFL team
Joe Prokop	Punter	1985 Green Bay Packers
J. C. Pearson	Defensive back	1986 Kansas City Chiefs
Patrick Cain	Center, guard	1987 Detroit Lions
