= Chris Kraus =

Chris Kraus may refer to:

- Chris Kraus (director) (born 1963), German author and film director
- Chris Kraus (writer) (born 1955), American and New Zealand writer and filmmaker

== See also ==
- Chris Krause (fl. 1990s–2010s), American entrepreneur
