= 1982 UCF Knights football team =

American college football season

1982 UCF Knights football
- Conference: Independent
- Record: 0–10
- Head coach: Sammy Weir (interim; 1st season)
- Home stadium: Orlando Stadium

1982 NCAA Division II independents football records
	Conf.			Overall
Team	W	L	T	W		L		T
No. 9 Southern Connecticut State		–		9	–	1	–	0
Eastern Washington		–		8	–	2	–	0
Saint Mary's		–		7	–	2	–	1
No. 6 Northern Michigan ^		–		8	–	3	–	0
Puget Sound		–		7	–	3	–	0
Central State (OH)		–		7	–	4	–	0
Liberty		–		7	–	4	–	0
Towson State		–		7	–	4	–	0
Arkansas–Pine Bluff		–		5	–	5	–	1
American International		–		4	–	6	–	0
New Haven		–		4	–	6	–	0
Morgan State		–		4	–	7	–	0
Springfield		–		3	–	7	–	0
Kentucky State		–		2	–	9	–	0
Sonoma State		–		2	–	9	–	0
Central Connecticut		–		1	–	7	–	1
UCF		–		0	–	10	–	0
^ – NCAA Division II playoff participant; Rankings from NCAA Division II Football Committee poll

The 1982 UCF Knights football season was the fourth season for the team. It was the first and only season for Sammy Weir as the head coach of the Knights. The season marked the Knights first in Division II. Weir's 1982 team posted 0–10 overall record.

The Knights competed as an NCAA Division II Independent. The Knights played their home games at Orlando Stadium, now known as the Citrus Bowl, in Downtown Orlando. One game, the season opener against Georgia Southern, was held at a neutral field, the Gator Bowl in Jacksonville. Several of their games were played against Division I-AA opponents. one game was played against the eventual Division III national champions West Georgia.

== Schedule ==
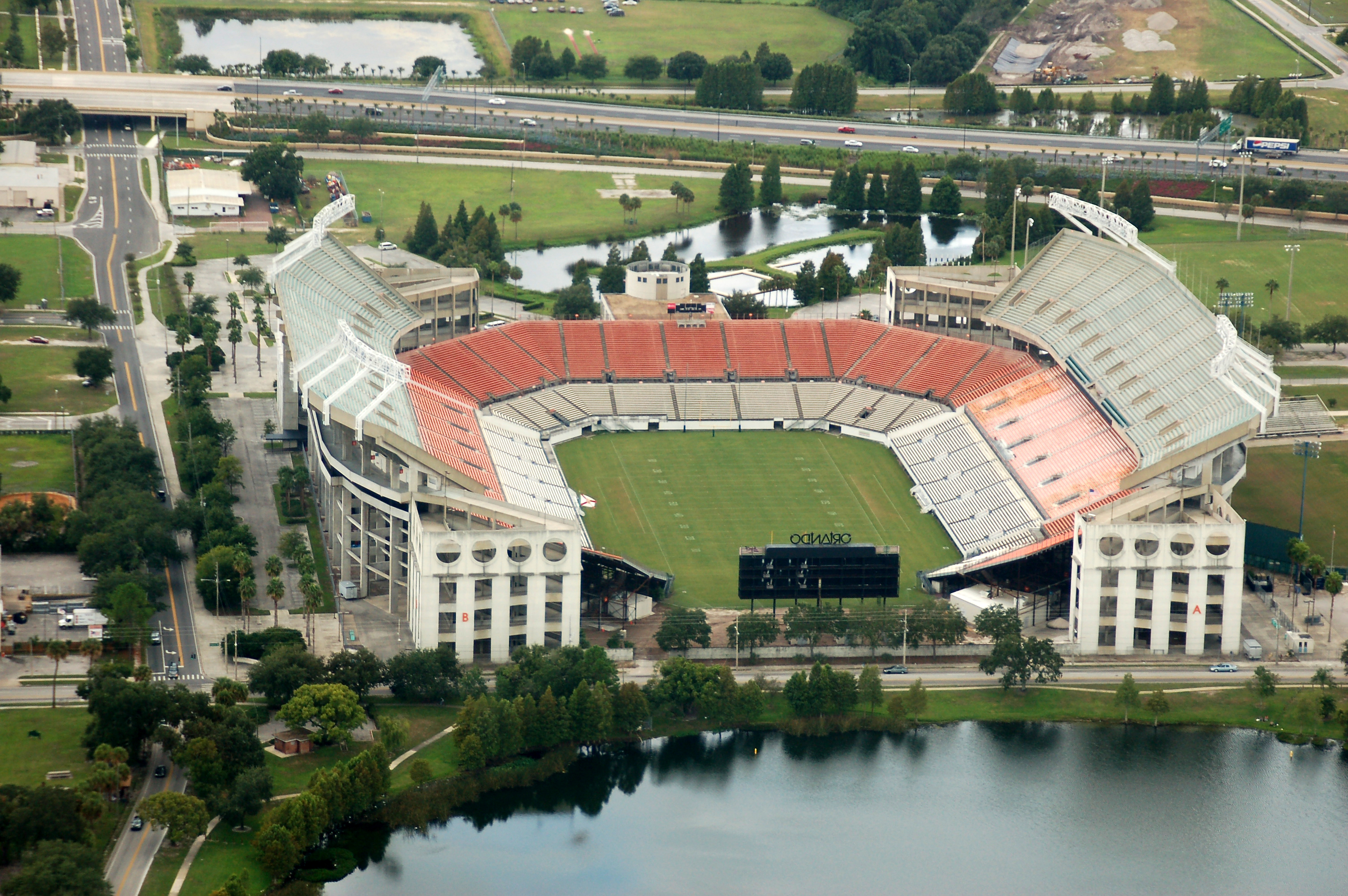
Orlando Stadium, the Knights' home field

Date	Opponent	Site	Result	Attendance	Source
September 11	vs. Georgia Southern	Gator Bowl; Jacksonville, FL	L 9–16	2,350	
September 18	Southeastern Louisiana	Orlando Stadium; Orlando, FL	L 14–24	8,196	
September 25	at VMI	Alumni Memorial Field; Lexington, VA	L 0–69	6,100	
October 2	at Valdosta State	Bazemore–Hyder Stadium; Valdosta, GA	L 7–13	9,500	
October 9	Bethune–Cookman	Orlando Stadium; Orlando, FL	L 21–40	9,127	
October 16	Alabama A&M	Orlando Stadium; Orlando, FL	L 10–31	6,654	
October 23	at Nicholls State	John L. Guidry Stadium; Thibodaux, LA	L 10–60	8,500	
October 30	West Georgia	Orlando Stadium; Orlando, FL	L 7–41	9,257	
November 6	Carson–Newman	Orlando Stadium; Orlando, FL	L 17–36	3,818	
November 13	Eastern Kentucky	Orlando Stadium; Orlando, FL	L 14–26	4,822	
