= 1982 Cal State Hayward Pioneers football team =

American college football season

1982 Cal State Hayward Pioneers football
- Conference: Northern California Athletic Conference
- Record: 4–5–1 (3–2 NCAC)
- Head coach: Tim Tierney (8th season)
- Home stadium: Pioneer Stadium

1982 Northern California Athletic Conference football standings
	Conf.					Overall
Team	W		L		T	W		L		T
No. 3 UC Davis $^	5	–	0	–	0	12	–	1	–	0
Sacramento State	3	–	2	–	0	8	–	3	–	0
Cal State Hayward	3	–	2	–	0	4	–	5	–	1
San Francisco State	2	–	3	–	0	4	–	6	–	0
Chico State	1	–	4	–	0	5	–	5	–	0
Humboldt State	1	–	4	–	0	3	–	7	–	0
$ – Conference champion; ^ – NCAA Division II playoff participant; Rankings from NCAA Division II Football Committee poll

The 1982 Cal State Hayward Pioneers football team represented California State University, Hayward—now known as California State University, East Bay—as a member of the Northern California Athletic Conference (NCAC) during the 1982 NCAA Division II football season. Led by eighth-year head coach Tim Tierney, Cal State Hayward compiled an overall record of 4–5–1 with a mark of 3–2 in conference play, tying for second place in the NCAC. The team outscored its opponents 240 to 236 for the season. The Pioneers played home games at Pioneer Stadium in Hayward, California.

== Schedule ==
Date	Opponent	Site	Result	Attendance	Source
September 11	at Cal State Northridge*	North Campus Stadium; Northridge, CA	L 37–38	1,016–1,116	
September 18	at Santa Clara*	Buck Shaw Stadium; Santa Clara, CA	L 27–35	5,328	
September 25	Puget Sound*	Pioneer Stadium; Hayward, CA	L 6–10		
October 2	Saint Mary's*	Pioneer Stadium; Hayward, CA	T 6–6		
October 9	Sacramento State	Pioneer Stadium; Hayward, CA	W 45–34	900	
October 16	Cal Poly Pomona*	Pioneer Stadium; Hayward, CA	W 28–17	300	
October 23	San Francisco State	Pioneer Stadium; Hayward, CA	W 42–13	1,809	
October 30	at Humboldt State	Redwood Bowl; Arcata, CA	W 10–0	3,972	
November 6	No. 6 UC Davis	Pioneer Stadium; Hayward, CA	L 6–41	4,100–8,200	
November 13	at Chico State	University Stadium; Chico, CA	L 33–42		
*Non-conference game; Rankings from NCAA Division II Football Committee Poll released prior to the game

== Team players in the NFL ==
No Cal State Hayward Pioneers players were selected in the 1983 NFL draft. The following finished their college career in 1982, were not drafted, but played in the NFL.

Player	Position	First NFL team
Sandy LaBeaux	Defensive back	1983 Tampa Bay Buccaneers
