= Tony Kehl =

American football player and coach (born 1942)

Biographical details
- Born: October 21, 1942 (age 84)

Playing career
- 1962: Minnesota
- 1964–1965: Humboldt State
- Positions: Guard, linebacker

Coaching career (HC unless noted)
- 1969–1971: Petaluma HS (CA) (OL/DL)
- 1972–1978: Petaluma HS (CA)
- 1979–1981: Nevada (DL)
- 1982–1986: Sonoma State

Head coaching record
- Overall: 12–40 (college); 49–21–2 (high school)

Anthony J. Kehl (born October 21, 1942) is an American football coach. He served as the head football coach at Sonoma State University from 1982 to 1986, compiling a record of 12–40.

== Head coaching record ==
=== College ===
Year	Team	Overall	Conference	Standing	Bowl/playoffs
Sonoma State Cossacks (NCAA Division II independent) (1982)
1982	Sonoma State	2–9			
Sonoma State:		2–9			
Sonoma State Cossacks (Northern California Athletic Conference) (1983–1986)
1983	Sonoma State	2–9	0–6	7th	
1984	Sonoma State	1–9	1–5	6th	
1985	Sonoma State	3–7	1–4	T–5th	
1986	Sonoma State	4–6	2–3	4th	
Sonoma State:		10–31	4–18		
Total:		12–40			
