= 1982 Santa Clara Broncos football team =

American college football season

1982 Santa Clara Broncos football
- Conference: Western Football Conference
- Record: 7–4 (3–1 WFC)
- Head coach: Pat Malley (24th season)
- Home stadium: Buck Shaw Stadium

1982 Western Football Conference standings
	Conf.					Overall
Team	W		L		T	W		L		T
Cal Poly $	4	–	0	–	0	6	–	5	–	0
Santa Clara	3	–	1	–	0	7	–	4	–	0
Cal State Northridge	2	–	2	–	0	4	–	7	–	0
Cal Poly Pomona	1	–	3	–	0	1	–	10	–	0
Portland State	0	–	4	–	0	2	–	9	–	0
$ – Conference champion

The 1982 Santa Clara Broncos football team represented Santa Clara University as a member of the Western Football Conference (WFC) during the 1982 NCAA Division II football season. The Broncos were led by head coach Pat Malley in his 24th year at the helm. They played home games at Buck Shaw Stadium in Santa Clara, California. The team finished the season with a record of seven wins and four losses (7–4, 3–1 WFC).

1982 was the first season for the Western Football Conference. In its initial season, the WFC had five teams. Three of them were the last members of the California Collegiate Athletic Association (CCAA) (Cal State Northridge, Cal Poly Pomona, and Cal Poly). They were joined by Santa Clara and Portland State. Santa Clara had played as an Independent prior to joining the WFC.

== Schedule ==
Date	Time	Opponent	Rank	Site	Result	Attendance	Source
September 11		at Portland State		Civic Stadium; Portland, OR	W 26–21	4,350	
September 18		Cal State Hayward*		Buck Shaw Stadium; Santa Clara, CA	W 35–27	5,328	
September 25		Cal State Northridge	No. 6	Buck Shaw Stadium; Santa Clara, CA	W 26–21	4,914	
October 2		San Francisco State*	No. 3	Buck Shaw Stadium; Santa Clara, CA	W 44–14	6,137	
October 9		at Humboldt State*	No. T–3	Redwood Bowl; Arcata, CA	W 41–13	3,287	
October 16		at No. 8 UC Davis*	No. 3	Toomey Field; Davis, CA	L 7–28	9,800	
October 23		at Cal Poly Pomona	No. T–10	Kellogg Field; Pomona, CA	W 19–14	2,468	
October 30		Cal Poly	No. 6	Buck Shaw Stadium; Santa Clara, CA	L 3–20	7,125	
November 6	7:01 p.m.	at San Jose State*		Spartan Stadium; San Jose, CA	L 0–40	17,793	
November 13		at Sonoma State*		Cossacks Stadium; Rohnert Park, CA	W 44–6	1,000–1,500	
November 20		at Saint Mary's*		Saint Mary's Stadium; Moraga, CA	L 10–13	5,568	
*Non-conference game; Rankings from NCAA Division II Football Committee Poll released prior to the game; All times are in Pacific time

== Team players in the NFL ==
No Santa Clara Broncos players were selected in the 1983 NFL draft.

The following finished their college career in 1982, were not drafted, but played in the NFL.

Player	Position	First NFL team
Don Brown	Tackle	1983 San Diego Chargers
