= 1982 Chico State Wildcats football team =

American college football season

1982 Chico State Wildcats football
- Conference: Northern California Athletic Conference
- Record: 5–5 (1–4 NCAC)
- Head coach: Dick Trimmer (9th season)
- Defensive coordinator: Mike Clemons (4th season)
- Home stadium: University Stadium

1982 Northern California Athletic Conference football standings
	Conf.					Overall
Team	W		L		T	W		L		T
No. 3 UC Davis $^	5	–	0	–	0	12	–	1	–	0
Sacramento State	3	–	2	–	0	8	–	3	–	0
Cal State Hayward	3	–	2	–	0	4	–	5	–	1
San Francisco State	2	–	3	–	0	4	–	6	–	0
Chico State	1	–	4	–	0	5	–	5	–	0
Humboldt State	1	–	4	–	0	3	–	7	–	0
$ – Conference champion; ^ – NCAA Division II playoff participant; Rankings from NCAA Division II Football Committee poll

The 1982 Chico State Wildcats football team represented California State University, Chico as a member of the Northern California Athletic Conference (NCAC) during the 1982 NCAA Division II football season. Led by ninth-year head coach Dick Trimmer, Chico State compiled an overall record of 5–5 with a mark of 1–4 in conference play, tying for fifth place in the NCAC. The team outscored its opponents 252 to 204 for the season. The Wildcats played home games at University Stadium in Chico, California.

== Schedule ==
Date	Opponent	Site	Result	Attendance	Source
September 11	Saint Mary's*	University Stadium; Chico, CA	L 21–28	5,500	
September 18	Sonoma State*	University Stadium; Chico, CA	W 46–6	1,900–5,000	
September 25	at Claremont-Mudd*	Fritz B. Burns Stadium; Claremont, CA	W 49–0	1,000–1,500	
October 2	at Simon Fraser*	Thunderbird Stadium; University Endowment Lands, BC	W 24–16	1,000	
October 9	Cal State Northridge*	University Stadium; Chico, CA	W 20–17	2,652–2,700	
October 23	at No. 4 UC Davis	Toomey Field; Davis, CA	L 13–28	9,600	
October 30	Sacramento State	University Stadium; Chico, CA	L 6–13		
November 6	at Humboldt State	Redwood Bowl; Arcata, CA	L 12–42		
November 13	Cal State Hayward	University Stadium; Chico, CA	W 42–33		
November 20	at San Francisco State	Cox Stadium; San Francisco, CA	L 19–21	1,010	
*Non-conference game; Rankings from NCAA Division II Football Committee Poll released prior to the game
