= Jim Sanderson (American football) =

American football coach

Biographical details
- Born: c. 1939

Coaching career (HC unless noted)
- 1968–1981: Cal Poly (DB)
- 1982–1986: Cal Poly

Head coaching record
- Overall: 26–27

Accomplishments and honors

Championships
- 1 WFC (1982)

Jim Sanderson (born c. 1939) is an American former college football coach. He served as the head football coach at California Polytechnic State University in San Luis Obispo, California from 1982 to 1986, compiling a record of 26–27. Sanderson worked a defensive assistant at Cal Poly before being named the head coach.

== Head coaching record ==
Year	Team	Overall	Conference	Standing	Bowl/playoffs
Cal Poly Mustangs (Western Football Conference) (1982–1986)
1982	Cal Poly	6–5	4–0	3rd	
1983	Cal Poly	5–6	1–2	T–3rd	
1984	Cal Poly	6–4	2–1	2nd	
1985	Cal Poly	4–7	2–3	4th	
1986	Cal Poly	5–5	3–3	T–4th	
Cal Poly:		26–27	12–9		
Total:		26–27			
National championship Conference title Conference division title or championship game berth
