= 1982 San Francisco State Gators football team =

American college football season

1982 San Francisco State Gators football
- Conference: Northern California Athletic Conference
- Record: 4–6 (2–3 NCAC)
- Head coach: Vic Rowen (22nd season)
- Home stadium: Cox Stadium

1982 Northern California Athletic Conference football standings
	Conf.					Overall
Team	W		L		T	W		L		T
No. 3 UC Davis $^	5	–	0	–	0	12	–	1	–	0
Sacramento State	3	–	2	–	0	8	–	3	–	0
Cal State Hayward	3	–	2	–	0	4	–	5	–	1
San Francisco State	2	–	3	–	0	4	–	6	–	0
Chico State	1	–	4	–	0	5	–	5	–	0
Humboldt State	1	–	4	–	0	3	–	7	–	0
$ – Conference champion; ^ – NCAA Division II playoff participant; Rankings from NCAA Division II Football Committee poll

The 1982 San Francisco State Gators football team represented San Francisco State University as a member of the Northern California Athletic Conference (NCAC) during the 1982 NCAA Division II football season. Led by 22nd-year head coach Vic Rowen, San Francisco State compiled an overall record of 4–6 with a mark of 2–3 in conference play, placing fourth in the NCAC. For the season the team was outscored by its opponents 218 to 163. The Gators played home games at Cox Stadium in San Francisco.

== Schedule ==
Date	Opponent	Site	Result	Attendance	Source
September 18	Cal State Northridge*	Cox Stadium; San Francisco, CA	L 14–24	1,050–1,800	
September 25	at Whittier*	Hadley Field; Whittier, CA	W 25–0	450–850	
October 2	at No. 3 Santa Clara*	Buck Shaw Stadium; Santa Clara, CA	L 14–44	6,137	
October 9	at Sonoma State*	Cossacks Stadium; Rohnert Park, CA	W 20–0	1,325–1,500	
October 16	at Saint Mary's*	Saint Mary's Stadium; Moraga, CA	L 17–21	4,675	
October 23	at Cal State Hayward	Pioneer Stadium; Hayward, CA	L 13–42	1,809	
October 30	No. 3 UC Davis	Cox Stadium; San Francisco, CA	L 6–42	3,251	
November 6	at Sacramento State	Hornet Stadium; Sacramento, CA	L 16–23	5,549	
November 13	Humboldt State	Cox Stadium; San Francisco, CA	W 17–3	1,231	
November 20	Chico State	Cox Stadium; San Francisco, CA	W 21–19	1,010	
*Non-conference game; Rankings from NCAA Division II Football Committee Poll released prior to the game
