= 1982 Sam Houston State Bearkats football team =

American college football season

1982 Sam Houston State Bearkats football
- Conference: Lone Star Conference
- Record: 3–8 (1–6 LSC)
- Head coach: Ron Randleman (1st season)
- Home stadium: Pritchett Field

1982 Lone Star Conference football standings
	Conf.					Overall
Team	W		L		T	W		L		T
No. 1 Southwest Texas State $^	7	–	0	–	0	14	–	0	–	0
Angelo State	4	–	3	–	0	7	–	3	–	0
East Texas State	4	–	3	–	0	6	–	4	–	0
Abilene Christian	4	–	3	–	0	6	–	4	–	0
Stephen F. Austin	4	–	3	–	0	6	–	5	–	0
Texas A&I	2	–	5	–	0	5	–	6	–	0
Howard Payne	1	–	6	–	0	3	–	7	–	0
Sam Houston State	1	–	6	–	0	3	–	8	–	0
$ – Conference champion; ^ – NCAA Division II playoff participant; Rankings from NCAA Division II Football Committee poll

The 1982 Sam Houston State Bearkats football team represented Sam Houston State University as a member of the Lone Star Conference (LSC) during the 1982 NCAA Division II football season. Led by first-year head coach Ron Randleman, the Bearkats compiled an overall record of 3–8 with a mark of 1–6 in conference play, and finished eighth in the LSC.

== Schedule ==
Date	Time	Opponent	Site	Result	Attendance	Source
September 11	7:30 p.m.	at UT Arlington*	Maverick Stadium; Arlington, TX	L 10–63	8,519	
September 18		at Lamar*	Cardinal Stadium; Beaumont, TX	L 7–27	11,882	
September 25		at Southwestern Oklahoma State*	Milam Stadium; Weatherford, OK	W 19–17	5,500	
October 2		at Texas Lutheran*	Matador Stadium; Seguin, TX	W 21–17	4,200	
October 9		East Texas State	Pritchett Field; Huntsville, TX	W 21–13	3,500	
October 16		vs. No. 1 Southwest Texas State	Houston Astrodome; Houston, TX (rivalry)	L 21–52	12,500–13,500	
October 23		at Texas A&I	Javelina Stadium; Kingsville, TX	L 10–33	10,500	
October 30		Howard Payne	Pritchett Field; Huntsville, TX	L 13–14	6,000	
November 6		at Abilene Christian	Shotwell Stadium; Abilene, TX	L 10–36	9,000	
November 13		at Angelo State	San Angelo Stadium; San Angelo, TX	L 14–44	7,000	
November 20		Stephen F. Austin	Pritchett Field; Huntsville, TX (rivalry)	L 6–40	3,000	
*Non-conference game; Rankings from NCAA Division II Football Committee Poll released prior to the game; All times are in Central time
