= 1982 Sonoma State Cossacks football team =

American college football season

1982 Sonoma State Cossacks football
- Conference: Independent
- Record: 2–9
- Head coach: Tony Kehl (1st season)
- Home stadium: Cossacks Stadium

1982 NCAA Division II independents football records
	Conf.			Overall
Team	W	L	T	W		L		T
No. 9 Southern Connecticut State		–		9	–	1	–	0
Eastern Washington		–		8	–	2	–	0
Saint Mary's		–		7	–	2	–	1
No. 6 Northern Michigan ^		–		8	–	3	–	0
Puget Sound		–		7	–	3	–	0
Central State (OH)		–		7	–	4	–	0
Liberty		–		7	–	4	–	0
Towson State		–		7	–	4	–	0
Arkansas–Pine Bluff		–		5	–	5	–	1
American International		–		4	–	6	–	0
New Haven		–		4	–	6	–	0
Morgan State		–		4	–	7	–	0
Springfield		–		3	–	7	–	0
Kentucky State		–		2	–	9	–	0
Sonoma State		–		2	–	9	–	0
Central Connecticut		–		1	–	7	–	1
UCF		–		0	–	10	–	0
^ – NCAA Division II playoff participant; Rankings from NCAA Division II Football Committee poll

The 1982 Sonoma State Cossacks football team represented Sonoma State University as an independent during the 1982 NCAA Division II football season. Led by first-year head coach Tony Kehl, Sonoma State compiled a record of 2–9. The team was outscored by its opponents 309 to 129 for the season. The Cossacks played home games at Cossacks Stadium (Note: Cossacks Stadium was renamed in 2002 to Seawolf Stadium when the University changed the name of the mascot to Seawolves.) in Rohnert Park, California.

== Schedule ==
Date	Opponent	Site	Result	Attendance	Source
September 11	at Sacramento State	Hornet Stadium; Sacramento, CA	L 17–39	5,284–5,384	
September 18	at Chico State	University Stadium; Chico, CA	L 6–46	1,900–5,000	
September 25	at Humboldt State	Redwood Bowl; Arcata, CA	L 6–24	2,700	
October 2	Redlands	Cossacks Stadium; Rohnert Park, CA	L 31–7	1,000	
October 9	San Francisco State	Cossacks Stadium; Rohnert Park, CA	L 0–20	1,325–1,500	
October 16	Southern Utah State	Cossacks Stadium; Rohnert Park, CA	L 17–38	1,500	
October 23	at Saint Mary's	Saint Mary's Stadium; Moraga, CA	L 7–23	1,221	
October 30	at Cal Lutheran	Mt. Clef Field; Thousand Oaks, CA	W 9–37	2,950	
November 6	San Francisco^{†}	Cossacks Stadium; Rohnert Park, CA	W 30–0	1,200–2,000	
November 13	Santa Clara	Cossacks Stadium; Rohnert Park, CA	L 6–44	1,000–1,500	
November 20	at Southern Oregon	Fuller Field; Ashland, OR	L 0–31	700	
^{†}Homecoming
