= List of Cal Poly Mustangs football seasons =

The following is a list of Cal Poly Mustangs football seasons for the football team that has represented California Polytechnic State University in NCAA competition.

== Season-by-season records ==
Year	Coach	Overall	Conference	Standing	Bowl/playoffs	Coaches^{#}	AP^{°}
D.W. Schlosser (1915–1917)
1915	D.W. Schlosser	1–0–1	0–0				
1916	D.W. Schlosser	1–2	0–0				
1917	D.W. Schlosser	2–1	0–0				
D.W. Schlosser:		4–2–1	0–0–0				
Flu Epidemic (1918)
1918	No Games	0–0	0–0				
H. Hess (1919–1920)
1919	H. Hess	3–0	0–0				
1920	H. Hess	1–4	0–0				
H. Hess:		4–4	0–0–0				
Al Agosti (1921–1932)
1921	Al Agosti	3–1–1	0–0				
1922	Al Agosti	1–3	0–2	7th			
1923	Al Agosti	3–3	2–1	4th			
1924	Al Agosti	1–5	0–3	8th			
1925	Al Agosti	4–5	0–0				
1926	Al Agosti	5–4	0–0				
1927	Al Agosti	2–4–1	0–0				
1928	Al Agosti	3–4–2	0–0				
1929	Al Agosti	3–5	0–0				
1930	No Games	0–0	0–0				
1931	Al Agosti	3–5–1	0–0				
1932	Al Agosti	4–4	0–0				
Al Agosti:		32–44–5	2–6				
Howie O'Daniels (1933–1941)
1933	Howie O'Daniels	7–0	0–0				
1934	Howie O'Daniels	6–2	0–0				
1935	Howie O'Daniels	5–2–1	0–0				
1936	Howie O'Daniels	5–4	0–0				
1937	Howie O'Daniels	4–2–2	0–0				
1938	Howie O'Daniels	7–2	0–0				
1939	Howie O'Daniels	4–4–1	0–0				
1940	Howie O'Daniels	6–3	0–0				
1941	Howie O'Daniels	5–3–1	0–0				
Howie O'Daniels:		45–22–5	0–0				
Bob Dakan (1942)
1942	Bob Dakan	4–2–1	0–0				
Bob Dakan:		4–2–1	0–0				
World War II (1943–1944)
1943	No Games	0–0	0–0				
1944	No Games	0–0	0–0				
Ronnie Henderson (1945)
1945	Ronnie Henderson	1–5–1	0–0				
Ronnie Henderson:		1–5–1	0–0				
Howie O'Daniels (1946–1947)
1946	Howie O'Daniels	6–2–1	1–1	3rd			
1947	Howie O'Daniels	1–9	0–5	6th			
Howie O'Daniels:		56–33–6	1–6				
Chuck Pavelko (1948–1949)
1948	Chuck Pavelko	3–5	1–4	T–5th			
1949	Chuck Pavelko	4–6	1–3	T–3rd			
Chuck Pavelko:		7–11	2–7				
LeRoy Hughes (1950–1961)
1950	LeRoy Hughes	3–7	0–4	5th			
1951	LeRoy Hughes	5–4–1	2–1–1	T–2nd			
1952	LeRoy Hughes	7–3	4–0	1st			
1953	LeRoy Hughes	9–0	5–0	1st			
1954	LeRoy Hughes	6–4	3–1	2nd			
1955	LeRoy Hughes	7–3	1–1	2nd			
1956	LeRoy Hughes	7–3	1–2	5th			
1957	LeRoy Hughes	8–1	3–0	1st			
1958	LeRoy Hughes	9–1	4–1	T–1st			15
1959	LeRoy Hughes	6–3	3–2	T–2nd			
1960	LeRoy Hughes	1–5–0*	1–2	incomplete			
1961	LeRoy Hughes	5–3	3–2	2nd			
LeRoy Hughes:		73–37–1	30–16–1				
Sheldon Harden (1962–1967)
1962	Sheldon Harden	4–5	2–3	T–3rd			
1963	Sheldon Harden	2–8	0–4	5th			
1964	Sheldon Harden	0–10	0–5	6th			
1965	Sheldon Harden	2–8	1–4	5th			
1966	Sheldon Harden	6–4	2–3	T–4th			
1967	Sheldon Harden	3–7	1–4	5th			
Sheldon Harden:		17–42	6–23				
Joe Harper (1968–1981)
1968	Joe Harper	7–3	2–2	T–2nd			
1969	Joe Harper	6–4	2–0	1st			
1970	Joe Harper	8–2	3–0	1st			20
1971	Joe Harper	6–5	3–0	1st			
1972	Joe Harper	8–1–1	3–0	1st	L Camellia Bowl	3	3
1973	Joe Harper	9–1	4–0	1st		8	9
1974	Joe Harper	5–4–1	2–1–1	2nd			
1975	Joe Harper	6–4	3–1	2nd			
1976	Joe Harper	7–1–1	2–0	1st			
1977	Joe Harper	6–4	2–0	1st			
1978	Joe Harper	7–3	2–0	1st	L NCAA Division II Playoff First Round		8
1979	Joe Harper	7–3	2–0	1st			7
1980	Joe Harper	10–3	2–0	1st	W NCAA Division II National Champions		3
1981	Joe Harper	4–5	0–2	3rd			
Joe Harper:		96–43–4	32–6–1				
Jim Sanderson (1982–1986)
1982	Jim Sanderson	6–5	4–0	1st			
1983	Jim Sanderson	5–6	1–2	T–3rd			
1984	Jim Sanderson	6–4	2–1	2nd			
1985	Jim Sanderson	4–7	2–3	4th			
1986	Jim Sanderson	5–5	3–3	T–4th			
Jim Sanderson:		26–27	12–9				
Lyle Setencich (1987–1993)
1987	Lyle Setencich	7–3	3–3	T–3rd			
1988	Lyle Setencich	5–4–1	3–3	4th			
1989	Lyle Setencich	5–5	1–4	6th			
1990	Lyle Setencich	10–2	4–1	T–1st	1990 NCAA Division II football season Playoff Quarterfinals	8	
1991	Lyle Setencich	4–6	2–3	4th			
1992	Lyle Setencich	4–5–1	2–3	T–4th			
1993	Lyle Setencich	6–4	1–3	T–4th			
Lyle Setencich:		41–29–2	16–20				
Andre Patterson (1994–1996)
1994	Andre Patterson	7–4	3	1st			
1995	Andre Patterson	5–6	2–1	2nd			
1996	Andre Patterson	5–6	0	Ind.			
Andre Patterson:		17–16	5–1				
Larry Welsh (1997–2000)
1997	Larry Welsh	10–1	0	Ind.		17	16
1998	Larry Welsh	3–8	0	Ind.			
1999	Larry Welsh	3–8	0	Ind.			
2000	Larry Welsh	3–8	0	Ind.			
Larry Welsh:		19–25	0–0				
Rich Ellerson (2001–2008)
2001	Rich Ellerson	6–5	0	Ind.			
2002	Rich Ellerson	3–8	0	Ind.			
2003	Rich Ellerson	7–4	0	Ind.			
2004	Rich Ellerson	9–2	4–1	1st		15	16
2005	Rich Ellerson	9–4	4–1	T–1st	2005 NCAA Division I-AA football season Playoff Quarterfinals	6	6
2006	Rich Ellerson	7–4	2–2	3rd		14	16
2007	Rich Ellerson	7–4	2–2	3rd			24
2008	Rich Ellerson	8–3	4	1st	2008 NCAA Division I FCS football season Playoff First Round	8	10
Rich Ellerson:		56–34	16–6				
Tim Walsh (2009–2019)
2009	Tim Walsh	4–7	1–3	5th			
2010	Tim Walsh	7–4	2–2	3rd		23	24
2011	Tim Walsh	6–5	3–1	T–1st			
2012	Tim Walsh	9–3	7–1	T–1st	2012 NCAA Division I FCS football season Playoff Second Round	11	12
2013	Tim Walsh	6–6	5–3	T–4th			
2014	Tim Walsh	7–5	5–3	T–4th			
2015	Tim Walsh	4–7	3–5	T–8th			
2016	Tim Walsh	7–5	5–3	T–4th	2016 NCAA Division I FCS football season Playoff First Round	21	24
2017	Tim Walsh	1–10	1–7	T–11th			
2018	Tim Walsh	5–6	4–4	T–6th			
2019	Tim Walsh	3–8	2–6	T–9th			
Tim Walsh:		59–66	39–41				
Beau Baldwin (2020–2022)
2020	Beau Baldwin	0–3	0–3	8th			
2021	Beau Baldwin	2–9	1–7	11th			
2022	Beau Baldwin	2–9	1–7	11th			
Beau Baldwin:		4–21	2–17				
Paul Wulff (2023–2025)
2023	Paul Wulff	3–8	1–7	11th			
2024	Paul Wulff	3–8	2–6	10th			
2025	Paul Wulff	4–8	2–6	T–8th			
Paul Wulff:		10–24	5–19				
Total:		522–458–20					
National championship Conference title Conference division title or championship game berth
^{†}Indicates Bowl Coalition, Bowl Alliance, BCS, or CFP / New Years' Six bowl.; ^{#}Rankings from final Coaches Poll.; *Last 3 games of the season canceled after a plane crash killed 16 players in Toledo, OH
