= 1982 Cal State Northridge Matadors football team =

American college football season

1982 Cal State Northridge Matadors football
- Conference: Western Football Conference
- Record: 4–7 (2–2 WFC)
- Head coach: Tom Keele (4th season)
- Home stadium: North Campus Stadium

1982 Western Football Conference standings
	Conf.					Overall
Team	W		L		T	W		L		T
Cal Poly $	4	–	0	–	0	6	–	5	–	0
Santa Clara	3	–	1	–	0	7	–	4	–	0
Cal State Northridge	2	–	2	–	0	4	–	7	–	0
Cal Poly Pomona	1	–	3	–	0	1	–	10	–	0
Portland State	0	–	4	–	0	2	–	9	–	0
$ – Conference champion

The 1982 Cal State Northridge Matadors football team represented California State University, Northridge as a member of the Western Football Conference (WFC) during the 1982 NCAA Division II football season. Led by fourth-year head coach Tom Keele, Cal State Northridge compiled an overall record of 4–7 with a mark of 2–2 in conference play, placing third in the WFC. The team was outscored by its opponents 287 to 257 for the season. The Matadors played home games at North Campus Stadium in Northridge, California.

1982 was the first season for the Western Football Conference. In its initial season, the WFC had five teams. Three of them were the final members of the California Collegiate Athletic Association (CCAA): Cal State Northridge, Cal Poly Pomona, and Cal Poly). They were joined by Santa Clara and Portland State, both of which had been independents.

== Schedule ==
Date	Opponent	Site	Result	Attendance	Source
September 4	Sacramento State*	North Campus Stadium; Northridge, CA	L 25–30	1,315	
September 11	Cal State Hayward*	North Campus Stadium; Northridge, CA	W 38–37	1,016–1,116	
September 18	at San Francisco State*	Cox Stadium; San Francisco, CA	W 24–14	1,050–1,800	
September 25	at Santa Clara	Buck Shaw Stadium; Santa Clara, CA	L 21–26	4,914	
October 2	at UC Davis*	Toomey Field; Davis, CA	L 20–30	8,200	
October 9	at Chico State*	University Stadium; Chico, CA	L 17–20	2,652–2,700	
October 16	Puget Sound*	North Campus Stadium; Northridge, CA	L 14–21	1,171	
October 23	at Cal Lutheran*	Mt. Clef Field; Thousand Oaks, CA	L 15–27	3,100	
November 6	Cal Poly Pomona	North Campus CA; Northridge, CA	W 38–30	4,710	
November 13	at Cal Poly	Mustang Stadium; San Luis Obispo, CA	L 14–24	5,483	
November 20	Portland State	North Campus Stadium; Northridge, CA	W 31–28	700	
*Non-conference game
