= Sammy Weir =

American football coach (born 1941)

No. 20, 84, 3
- Position: Wide receiver

Personal information
- Born: March 18, 1941 (age 85); Walnut Ridge, Arkansas, U.S.
- Listed height: 5 ft 9 in (1.75 m)
- Listed weight: 170 lb (77 kg)

Career information
- High school: Walnut Ridge
- College: Arkansas State (1959-1962)
- NFL draft: 1965: undrafted

Career history

Playing
- Charleston Rockets (1964); Houston Oilers (1965); New York Jets (1966); Orlando Panthers (1967–1968); Houston Texans-Shreveport Steamer (1974)

Coaching
- Evans HS (FL) (1967) JV coach; Orlando Panthers (1968) Assistant coach; Batesville HS (AR) (1969–1970) Head coach; Arkansas St. (1971–1972) Wide receivers coach; Lakeview HS (FL) (1973–1974) Head coach; Lake Brantley HS (FL) (1975) Head coach; Evans HS (FL) (1976–1977) Head coach; Lake Howell HS (FL) (1979–1980) Head coach; UCF (1981) Assistant head coach; UCF (1982) Interim head coach; West Orange HS (FL) (1983) Head coach; Edgewater HS (FL) (1984–1988) Head coach; Edgewater HS (FL) (1992) Offensive backs coach; Walnut Ridge HS (AR) (1995–1996) Head coach; Salem HS (AR) (2008–2011) Head coach

Career AFL statistics
- Receptions: 2
- Receiving yards: 16
- Return yards: 384
- Stats at Pro Football Reference

Head coaching record
- Career: College: 0–10–0 (.000); High school: 97–112–2 (.464)

Samuel Orville Weir (born March 18, 1941) is an American former football player and coach. He played professionally as a wide receiver in the American Football League (AFL).

Weir played college football the for Arkansas State Wolves before joining the AFL with the Houston Oilers and New York Jets. He also played for the Orlando Panthers of the Continental Football League (COFL) and the Houston Texans of the World Football League (WFL). He was the interim head football coach for the University of Central Florida in 1982.

== Early life and playing career ==
Weir was born on March 18, 1941, in Walnut Ridge, Arkansas. He attended Walnut Ridge High School. He played college football for Arkansas State as a quarterback and wide receiver from 1960 to 1964. He was also a member of the track and field team where he was named MVP.

After going undrafted in the 1965 NFL draft, Weir was signed by the Houston Oilers of the American Football League (AFL). He was officially listed as a flanker and played in nine games where he recorded a single reception. He also was used as a kick returner. In 1966, he was traded to the New York Jets, also of the AFL. With the Jets, he played in eleven games before suffering a broken hand late in the season. He was placed on injured reserve and was not retained following the season.

In 1967, Weir signed with the Orlando Panthers of the Continental Football League (COFL). In two seasons, he helped lead the team to an overall record of 21–5 and two COFL championships. He retired following the 1968 season.

In 1974, Weir briefly came out of retirement for the Houston Texans of the World Football League (WFL).

== Coaching career ==
In 1967, while playing for the Orlando Predators, Weir served as the junior varsity coach for Evans High School. In 1968, he served as a player-coach for the Predators.

In 1969, Weir earned his first head coaching position as the head football coach for Batesville High School. He held the position for two years before joining his alma mater, Arkansas State, as the team's wide receivers coach. In 1973, he moved to Florida and served as the head football coach for Lakeview High School. He led Lakeview to a 6–4 record in his last season. In 1975, Weir served a one-year stint as head coach for Lake Brantley High School. He rejoined Evans High School in 1976. In two seasons he led the Trojans to an overall record of 17–5 and two conference championships before resigning after the 1977 season. After not coaching in 1978, he was hired for his fifth head coaching position as he was hired by Lake Howell High School. After leading the school to its first conference championship and an 8–2 record, he resigned.

In 1981, Weir earned his second college football coaching position as he was hired as the associate head coach for UCF under head coach Don Jonas. After one season as an assistant and following Jonas' retirement, Weir was promoted to interim head coach for the Knight's 1982 season during their first year as an NCAA Division II program. He led the team to a 0–10 record before opting not to apply for the full-time position.

In 1983, Weir returned to the high school ranks as the head coach for West Orange High School. He resigned after one season to work for a business in Little Rock, Arkansas. Not long after, in 1984, he began a five-year stint as head coach for Edgewater High School. He finished his inaugural season going 0–10. He resigned after the 1988 season. In 1992, he returned to Edgewater as the offensive backfield coach. In 1995, after not coaching for the previous two years he was hired as the head coach for his high school alma mater, Walnut Ridge High School. After one season he retired. In 2008, Weir was hired as the head coach for Salem High School. He retired after four seasons with the school.

== Head coaching record ==
=== College ===
Year	Team	Overall	Conference	Standing	Bowl/playoffs
UCF Knights (NCAA Division II independent) (1982)
1982	UCF	0–10			
UCF:		0–10			
Total:		0–10			

=== High school ===
Year	Team	Overall	Conference	Standing	Bowl/playoffs
Batesville Pioneers () (1969–1970)
1969	Batesville	5–5	2–2		
1970	Batesville	6–4	3–1		
Batesville:		11–9	5–3		
Lakeview Red Devils () (1973–1974)
1973	Lakeview	4–4–2			
1974	Lakeview	6–4		2nd	
Lakeview:		10–8–2			
Lake Brantley Patriots () (1975)
1975	Lake Brantley	3–7			
Lake Brantley:		3–7			
Evans Trojans () (1976–1977)
1976	Evans	8–3		1st	
1977	Evans	9–2		1st	
Evans:		17–5			
Lake Howell Silver Hawks () (1979–1980)
1979	Lake Howell	4–6			
1980	Lake Howell	8–2		1st	
Lake Howell:		12–8			
West Orange Vikings () (1983)
1983	West Orange	8–2			
West Orange:		8–2			
Edgewater Eagles () (1984–1988)
1984	Edgewater	0–10	0–7		
1985	Edgewater	4–6			
1986	Edgewater	1–9			
1987	Edgewater	5–5			
1988	Edgewater	0–9			
Edgewater:		10–39			
Walnut Ridge Bobcats () (1995–1996)
1995	Walnut Ridge	4–5	3–4		
1996	Walnut Ridge	5–5	4–4		
Walnut Ridge:		9–10	7–8		
Salem Greyhounds () (2008–2011)
2008	Salem	1–9	1–7	8th	
2009	Salem	6–4	5–3	5th	
2010	Salem	1–8	0–7	8th	
2011	Salem	9–3	5–2	3rd	
Salem:		17–24	11–19		
Total:		97–112–2			
National championship Conference title Conference division title or championship game berth
