= 1982 Sacramento State Hornets football team =

American college football season

1982 Sacramento State Hornets football
- Conference: Northern California Athletic Conference
- Record: 8–3 (3–2 NCAC)
- Head coach: Bob Mattos (5th season)
- Home stadium: Hornet Stadium

1982 Northern California Athletic Conference football standings
	Conf.					Overall
Team	W		L		T	W		L		T
No. 3 UC Davis $^	5	–	0	–	0	12	–	1	–	0
Sacramento State	3	–	2	–	0	8	–	3	–	0
Cal State Hayward	3	–	2	–	0	4	–	5	–	1
San Francisco State	2	–	3	–	0	4	–	6	–	0
Chico State	1	–	4	–	0	5	–	5	–	0
Humboldt State	1	–	4	–	0	3	–	7	–	0
$ – Conference champion; ^ – NCAA Division II playoff participant; Rankings from NCAA Division II Football Committee poll

The 1982 Sacramento State Hornets football team represented California State University, Sacramento as a member of the Northern California Athletic Conference (NCAC) during the 1982 NCAA Division II football season. Led by fifth-year head coach Bob Mattos, Sacramento State compiled an overall record of 8–3 with a mark of 3–2 in conference play, tying for second place in the NCAC. The team outscored its opponents 249 to 243 for the season. The Hornets played home games at Hornet Stadium in Sacramento, California.

== Schedule ==
Date	Opponent	Site	Result	Attendance	Source
September 4	at Cal State Northridge	Devonshire Downs; Northridge, CA	W 30–25	1,315	
September 11	Sonoma State*	Hornet Stadium; Sacramento, CA	W 39–17	5,284–5,384	
September 18	at Cal Poly Pomona	Kellogg Field; Pomona, CA	W 16–14	1,491	
September 25	Saint Mary's*	Hornet Stadium; Sacramento, CA	W 13–10	6,808	
October 9	at Cal State Hayward*	Pioneer Stadium; Hayward, CA	L 34–45	900	
October 16	Cal Lutheran*	Hornet Stadium; Sacramento, CA	W 31–24	6,428	
October 23	Humboldt State	Hornet Stadium; Sacramento, CA	W 30–6	6,020	
October 30	at Chico State	University Stadium; Chico, CA	W 13–6		
November 6	San Francisco State*	Hornet Stadium; Sacramento, CA	W 23–14	5,549	
November 13	at No. 3 UC Davis*	Toomey Field; Davis, CA (rivalry)	L 6–51	12,700	
November 20	Eastern Washington*	Hornet Stadium; Sacramento, CA	L 14–31	2,350	
*Non-conference game; Rankings from NCAA Division II Football Committee Poll released prior to the game

== Team players in the NFL ==
The following Sacramento State players were selected in the 1983 NFL draft.

Player	Position	Round	Overall	NFL team
Ken O'Brien	Quarterback	1	24	New York Jets
