= 1982 East Texas State Lions football team =

American college football season

1982 East Texas State Lions football
- Conference: Lone Star Conference
- Record: 6–4 (4–3 LSC)
- Head coach: Ernest Hawkins (19th season)
- Offensive scheme: Option
- Defensive coordinator: Bobby Fox (12th season)
- Base defense: 5–2
- Home stadium: Memorial Stadium

1982 Lone Star Conference football standings
	Conf.					Overall
Team	W		L		T	W		L		T
No. 1 Southwest Texas State $^	7	–	0	–	0	14	–	0	–	0
Angelo State	4	–	3	–	0	7	–	3	–	0
East Texas State	4	–	3	–	0	6	–	4	–	0
Abilene Christian	4	–	3	–	0	6	–	4	–	0
Stephen F. Austin	4	–	3	–	0	6	–	5	–	0
Texas A&I	2	–	5	–	0	5	–	6	–	0
Howard Payne	1	–	6	–	0	3	–	7	–	0
Sam Houston State	1	–	6	–	0	3	–	8	–	0
$ – Conference champion; ^ – NCAA Division II playoff participant; Rankings from NCAA Division II Football Committee poll

The 1982 East Texas State Lions football team represented East Texas State University—now known as Texas A&M University–Commerce—as a member of the Lone Star Conference (LSC) during the 1982 NCAA Division II football season. Led by 19th-year head coach Ernest Hawkins, the Lions compiled an overall record of 6–4 with a mark of 4–3 in conference play, placing in a four-way tie for second in the LSC. East Texas State played home games at Memorial Stadium in Commerce, Texas.

== Schedule ==
Date	Opponent	Site	Result	Attendance	Source
September 11	at Cameron*	Cameron Stadium; Lawton, OK	W 35–21	5,000	
September 18	Southern Arkansas*	Memorial Stadium; Commerce, TX	L 11–13	6,000	
October 2	Northwestern State*	Memorial Stadium; Commerce, TX	W 24–20	5,500	
October 9	at Sam Houston State	Pritchett Field; Huntsville, TX	L 13–21	3,500	
October 16	Howard Payne	Memorial Stadium; Commerce, TX	W 37–17	3,000	
October 23	at Abilene Christian	Shotwell Stadium; Abilene, TX	W 26–25	13,500	
October 30	No. 1 Southwest Texas State	Memorial Stadium; Commerce, TX	L 34–38	7,500	
November 6	at Texas A&I	Javelina Stadium; Kingsville, TX	W 37–22	9,500	
November 13	at Stephen F. Austin	Lumberjack Stadium; Nacogdoches, TX	L 14–17	4,215	
November 20	Angelo State	Memorial Stadium; Commerce, TX	W 24–20	1,500	
*Non-conference game; Rankings from NCAA Division II Football Committee Poll released prior to the game

== Postseason awards ==
=== All-Americans ===
- Kyle Mackey, Honorable Mention Quarterback

=== LSC First Team ===
- Ben Boston, Defensive Back
- Ricky Dirks, Running Back
- Kyle Mackey, Quarterback
- Peter Roos, Offensive Tackle

=== LSC Second Team ===
- Javier Cardenas, Tight End
- David Lowe, Defensive End
- Burl Perry, Center

=== LSC Honorable Mention ===
- Chris Flynn, Defensive Back
- Randy Jones, Punter
- Kevin Rush, Linebacker
- Vaughn Williamson, Offensive Guard
