= 1982 Troy State Trojans football team =

American college football season

1982 Troy State Trojans football
- Conference: Gulf South Conference
- Record: 2–8 (2–5 GSC)
- Head coach: Charlie Bradshaw (7th season)
- Home stadium: Veterans Memorial Stadium

1982 Gulf South Conference football standings
	Conf.					Overall
Team	W		L		T	W		L		T
No. 5 Jacksonville State $^	7	–	0	–	0	10	–	2	–	0
Mississippi College	6	–	1	–	0	8	–	3	–	0
North Alabama	4	–	3	–	0	7	–	3	–	0
Delta State	3	–	4	–	0	6	–	4	–	0
Livingston	3	–	4	–	0	6	–	4	–	0
Valdosta State	2	–	4	–	0	6	–	5	–	1
Troy State	2	–	5	–	0	2	–	8	–	0
Tennessee–Martin	0	–	6	–	0	5	–	6	–	0
$ – Conference champion; ^ – NCAA Division II playoff participant; Rankings from NCAA Division II Football Committee poll

The 1982 Troy State Trojans football team represented Troy State University (now known as Troy University) as a member of the Gulf South Conference (GSC) during the 1982 NCAA Division II football season. Led by seventh-year head coach Charlie Bradshaw, the Trojans compiled an overall record of 2–8, with a mark of 2–5 in conference play, and finished seventh in the GSC.

== Schedule ==
Date	Opponent	Site	Result	Attendance	Source
September 11	at Chattanooga*	Chamberlain Field; Chattanooga, TN	L 10–24	10,002	
September 18	at Valdosta State	Cleveland Field; Valdosta, GA	L 21–24	9,300	
September 25	at Nicholls State*	John L. Guidry Stadium; Thibodaux, LA	L 3–10	6,100	
October 2	Mississippi College	Veterans Memorial Stadium; Troy, AL	L 7–31	3,000	
October 9	at Southeastern Louisiana*	Strawberry Stadium; Hammond, LA	L 7–21	7,200	
October 16	Delta State	Veterans Memorial Stadium; Troy, AL	L 10–13	7,246	
October 23	at North Alabama	Braly Municipal Stadium; Florence, AL	L 6–38	5,000	
October 30	Tennessee–Martin	Veterans Memorial Stadium; Troy, AL	W 54–10	2,100	
November 6	Livingston	Veterans Memorial Stadium; Troy, AL	W 45–0	3,000	
November 13	at No. 5 Jacksonville State	Paul Snow Stadium; Jacksonville, AL (rivalry)	L 14–49	9,000	
*Non-conference game; Rankings from Coaches' Poll released prior to the game
