= 1982 UC Davis Aggies football team =

American college football season

1982 UC Davis Aggies football

NCAC champion

NCAA Division II Championship Game—Palm Bowl, L 17–26 vs. Southwest Texas State
- Conference: Northern California Athletic Conference
- Record: 12–1 (5–0 NCAC)
- Head coach: Jim Sochor (13th season)
- Home stadium: Toomey Field

1982 Northern California Athletic Conference football standings
	Conf.					Overall
Team	W		L		T	W		L		T
No. 3 UC Davis $^	5	–	0	–	0	12	–	1	–	0
Sacramento State	3	–	2	–	0	8	–	3	–	0
Cal State Hayward	3	–	2	–	0	4	–	5	–	1
San Francisco State	2	–	3	–	0	4	–	6	–	0
Chico State	1	–	4	–	0	5	–	5	–	0
Humboldt State	1	–	4	–	0	3	–	7	–	0
$ – Conference champion; ^ – NCAA Division II playoff participant; Rankings from NCAA Division II Football Committee poll

The 1982 UC Davis football team represented the University of California, Davis as a member of the Northern California Athletic Conference (NCAC) during the 1982 NCAA Division II football season. Led by 13th-year head coach Jim Sochor, UC Davis compiled an overall record of 12–1 with a mark of 5–0 in conference play, winning the NCAC title for the 12th consecutive season. 1982 was the team's 13th consecutive winning season. The Aggies advanced to the NCAA Division II Football Championship playoffs, where they beat Northern Michigan in the quarterfinals and North Dakota State in the semifinals before losing to Southwest Texas State in the Palm Bowl, the NCAA Division II title game. The team outscored its opponents 405 to 164 for the season. The Aggies played home games at Toomey Field in Davis, California.

== Schedule ==
Date	Opponent	Rank	Site	Result	Attendance	Source
September 11	at Pacific (CA)*		Pacific Memorial Stadium; Stockton, CA	W 23–22	16,988	
September 25	at Cal Poly Pomona*		Kellogg Field; Pomona, CA	W 37–7	2,362	
October 2	Cal State Northridge*		Toomey Field; Davis, CA	W 30–20	8,200	
October 9	Cal Poly*		Toomey Field; Davis, CA (rivalry)	W 24–0	9,500–9,750	
October 16	No. 3 Santa Clara*	No. 9	Toomey Field; Davis, CA	W 28–7	10,000	
October 23	Chico State	No. 4	Toomey Field; Davis, CA	W 28–13	9,600	
October 30	at San Francisco State	No. 3	Cox Stadium; San Francisco, CA	W 42–6	3,251	
November 6	at Cal State Hayward	No. 3	Pioneer Stadium; Hayward, CA	W 41–6	4,100	
November 13	Sacramento State	No. 3	Toomey Field; Davis, CA (rivalry)	W 51–6	12,700	
November 20	at Humboldt State	No. 3	Redwood Bowl; Arcata, CA	W 31–8	2,500–2,623	
November 27	No. 6 Northern Michigan*	No. 3	Toomey Field; Davis, CA (NCAA Division II Quarterfinal)	W 42–21		
December 4	No. 2 North Dakota State*	No. 3	Toomey Field; Davis, CA (NCAA Division II Semifinal)	W 19–14		
December 11	vs. No. 1 Southwest Texas State*	No. 3	McAllen Veterans Memorial Stadium; McAllen, TX (NCAA Division II Championship Game—Palm Bowl)	L 9–34		
*Non-conference game; Rankings from NCAA Division II Football Committee Poll released prior to the game

== NFL draft ==
Quarterback Ken O'Brien was selected by the New York Jets with the 24th overall pick in the 1983 NFL draft.
