= 1982 Humboldt State Lumberjacks football team =

American college football season

1982 Humboldt State Lumberjacks football
- Conference: Northern California Athletic Conference
- Record: 3–7 (1–4 NCAC)
- Head coach: Bud Van Deren (17th season)
- Home stadium: Redwood Bowl

1982 Northern California Athletic Conference football standings
	Conf.					Overall
Team	W		L		T	W		L		T
No. 3 UC Davis $^	5	–	0	–	0	12	–	1	–	0
Sacramento State	3	–	2	–	0	8	–	3	–	0
Cal State Hayward	3	–	2	–	0	4	–	5	–	1
San Francisco State	2	–	3	–	0	4	–	6	–	0
Chico State	1	–	4	–	0	5	–	5	–	0
Humboldt State	1	–	4	–	0	3	–	7	–	0
$ – Conference champion; ^ – NCAA Division II playoff participant; Rankings from NCAA Division II Football Committee poll

The 1982 Humboldt State Lumberjacks football team represented Humboldt State University—now known as California State Polytechnic University, Humboldt—as a member of the Northern California Athletic Conference (NCAC) during the 1982 NCAA Division II football season. Led by 17th-year head coach Bud Van Deren, the Lumberjacks compiled an overall record of 3–7 with a mark of 1–4 in conference play, tying for fifth place in the NCAC. The team was outscored by its opponents 191 to 131 for the season. Humboldt State played home games at the Redwood Bowl in Arcata, California.

== Schedule ==
Date	Opponent	Site	Result	Attendance	Source
September 18	at Cal Lutheran*	Mt. Clef Field; Thousand Oaks, CA	L 7–21	2,857	
September 25	Sonoma State*	Redwood Bowl; Arcata, CA	W 24–6	2,700	
October 2	at Puget Sound*	Baker Stadium; Tacoma, WA	L 14–16		
October 9	Santa Clara*	Redwood Bowl; Arcata, CA	L 13–41	3,287	
October 16	Southern Oregon*	Redwood Bowl; Arcata, CA	W 14–7	2,223	
October 23	at Sacramento State	Hornet Stadium; Sacramento, CA	L 6–30	6,020	
October 30	Cal State Hayward	Redwood Bowl; Arcata, CA	L 0–10	3,972	
November 6	Chico State	Redwood Bowl; Arcata, CA	W 42–12	1,350	
November 13	at San Francisco State	Cox Stadium; San Francisco, CA	L 3–17	1,231	
November 20	No. 3 UC Davis	Redwood Bowl; Arcata, CA	L 8–31	2,500–2,623	
*Non-conference game; Rankings from NCAA Division II Football Committee Poll released prior to the game
