= 1982 Georgia Southern Eagles football team =

American college football season

1982 Georgia Southern Eagles football
- Conference: Independent
- Record: 7–3–1
- Head coach: Erk Russell (1st season)
- Home stadium: Womack Stadium

The 1982 Georgia Southern Eagles football team represented the Georgia Southern Eagles of Georgia Southern College (now known as Georgia Southern University) during the 1982 NCAA Division I-AA football season. This was the Eagles' first season of football since the suspension of the program following the 1941 season. The Eagles played their home games at Womack Stadium in Statesboro, Georgia. The team was coached by Erk Russell, in his first year as head coach for the Eagles.

== Schedule ==
Date	Opponent	Site	Result	Attendance	Source
September 11	vs. UCF	Gator Bowl; Jacksonville, FL	W 16–9	2,350	
September 18	vs. Baptist (GA)	Memorial Stadium; Savannah, GA	W 42–0	7,823	
September 25	Valdosta State	Womack Stadium; Statesboro, GA	T 27–27	7,724	
October 2	at Gardner–Webb	Ernest W. Spangler Stadium; Boiling Springs, NC	L 6–44	2,051	
October 9	Fort Benning	Womack Stadium; Statesboro, GA	W 56–6	5,341	
October 23	Newberry	Womack Stadium; Statesboro, GA	W 36–14	6,050	
October 30	Catawba	Womack Stadium; Statesboro, GA	L 7–10	8,219	
November 6	Wofford	Womack Stadium; Statesboro, GA	L 7–28	5,127	
November 13	at Mars Hill	Mars Hill, NC	W 17–3	1,000	
November 20	at Valdosta State	Bazemore–Hyder Stadium; Valdosta, GA	W 45–29	9,000	
November 27	vs. Florida State JV	International Stadium; Warner Robins, GA	W 31–20	5,000	
