= 1982 NCAA Division II football season =

American college football season

- Regular season: August – November 1982
- Playoffs: December 1982
- National Championship: Palm Bowl; Veterans Stadium; McAllen, TX
- Champion: Southwest Texas State (2)

The 1982 NCAA Division II football season, part of college football in the United States organized by the National Collegiate Athletic Association at the Division II level, began in August 1982, and concluded with the NCAA Division II Football Championship on December 11, 1982, at McAllen Veterans Memorial Stadium in McAllen, Texas. During the game's five-year stretch in McAllen, the "City of Palms", it was referred to as the Palm Bowl.

Southwest Texas State defeated UC Davis in the championship game, 34–9, to win their second overall and second consecutive Division II national title.

== Conference changes and new programs ==
- One team upgraded from Division II to Division I-AA prior to the season.
- The Far Western Football Conference changed its name to the Northern California Athletic Conference. Its membership remained the same.
- The Lone Star Conference became a full Division II member conference.
- The Western Football Conference was formed by five football-playing schools in California.

School	1981 Conference	1982 Conference
Alabama State	Independent	SWAC (I-AA)
Cal Poly	CCAA	Western
Cal Poly Pomona	CCAA	Western
Cal State Northridge	CCAA	Western
Central Florida	D-III Independent	D-II Independent
Mankato State	Independent	North Central
Portland State	Independent	Western
Santa Clara	Independent	Western
St. Cloud State	Independent	North Central
West Chester	Independent	PSAC
Valdosta State	New program	Gulf South

== Conference standings ==
1981 Central Intercollegiate Athletic Association football standings
	Conf.					Overall
Team	W		L		T	W		L		T
Northern
No. 8 Virginia Union xy$^	6	–	1	–	0	8	–	3	–	0
Hampton	5	–	2	–	0	8	–	2	–	0
Norfolk State	5	–	2	–	0	6	–	4	–	0
Elizabeth City State	3	–	4	–	0	5	–	5	–	0
Virginia State	2	–	5	–	0	2	–	8	–	0
Saint Paul's (VA)	0	–	7	–	0	2	–	8	–	0
Southern
North Carolina Central xy	6	–	1	–	0	7	–	4	–	0
Johnson C. Smith	6	–	1	–	0	7	–	3	–	0
Livingstone	3	–	4	–	0	5	–	5	–	0
Fayetteville State	2	–	5	–	0	2	–	8	–	0
Winston-Salem State	2	–	5	–	0	2	–	8	–	0
Bowie State	1	–	6	–	0	2	–	8	–	0
Championship: Virginia Union 33, North Carolina Central 26
$ – Conference champion; x – Division champion/co-champions; y – Championship game participant; ^ – NCAA Division II playoff participant; Rankings from NCAA Division II Football Committee poll

1982 Great Lakes Intercollegiate Athletic Conference football standings
	Conf.					Overall
Team	W		L		T	W		L		T
No. 1 Hillsdale $^	6	–	0	–	0	12	–	1	–	0
Grand Valley State	5	–	1	–	0	7	–	3	–	0
Northwood	4	–	2	–	0	6	–	4	–	0
Wayne State (MI)	2	–	4	–	0	3	–	7	–	0
Ferris State	2	–	4	–	0	2	–	6	–	0
Michigan Tech	1	–	5	–	0	1	–	8	–	0
Saginaw Valley State	1	–	5	–	0	1	–	9	–	0
$ – Conference champion; ^ – NAIA Division I playoff participant; Rankings from NAIA Division I poll

1982 Gulf South Conference football standings
	Conf.					Overall
Team	W		L		T	W		L		T
No. 5 Jacksonville State $^	7	–	0	–	0	10	–	2	–	0
Mississippi College	6	–	1	–	0	8	–	3	–	0
North Alabama	4	–	3	–	0	7	–	3	–	0
Delta State	3	–	4	–	0	6	–	4	–	0
Livingston	3	–	4	–	0	6	–	4	–	0
Valdosta State	2	–	4	–	0	6	–	5	–	1
Troy State	2	–	5	–	0	2	–	8	–	0
Tennessee–Martin	0	–	6	–	0	5	–	6	–	0
$ – Conference champion; ^ – NCAA Division II playoff participant; Rankings from NCAA Division II Football Committee poll

1982 Heartland Collegiate Conference standings
	Conf.					Overall
Team	W		L		T	W		L		T
Ashland $	6	–	1	–	0	8	–	2	–	0
Butler	5	–	2	–	0	7	–	3	–	0
Evansville	5	–	2	–	0	6	–	4	–	0
Franklin (IN)	5	–	2	–	0	6	–	4	–	0
Indiana Central	3	–	4	–	0	4	–	6	–	0
Saint Joseph's (IN)	2	–	5	–	0	4	–	6	–	0
Valparaiso	1	–	6	–	0	3	–	7	–	0
Georgetown (KY)	1	–	6	–	0	2	–	8	–	0
$ – Conference champion

1982 Lone Star Conference football standings
	Conf.					Overall
Team	W		L		T	W		L		T
No. 1 Southwest Texas State $^	7	–	0	–	0	14	–	0	–	0
Angelo State	4	–	3	–	0	7	–	3	–	0
East Texas State	4	–	3	–	0	6	–	4	–	0
Abilene Christian	4	–	3	–	0	6	–	4	–	0
Stephen F. Austin	4	–	3	–	0	6	–	5	–	0
Texas A&I	2	–	5	–	0	5	–	6	–	0
Howard Payne	1	–	6	–	0	3	–	7	–	0
Sam Houston State	1	–	6	–	0	3	–	8	–	0
$ – Conference champion; ^ – NCAA Division II playoff participant; Rankings from NCAA Division II Football Committee poll

1982 Missouri Intercollegiate Athletic Association football standings
	Conf.					Overall
Team	W		L		T	W		L		T
NE Missouri State $^	5	–	0	–	0	9	–	2	–	0
Central Missouri State	3	–	2	–	0	7	–	3	–	0
Missouri-Rolla	3	–	2	–	0	8	–	3	–	0
SE Missouri State	3	–	2	–	0	5	–	5	–	1
NW Missouri State	0	–	4	–	1	2	–	7	–	1
Lincoln (MO)	0	–	4	–	1	1	–	8	–	1
$ – Conference champion; ^ – NCAA Division II playoff participant

1982 North Central Conference football standings
	Conf.					Overall
Team	W		L		T	W		L		T
No. 2 North Dakota State $^	7	–	0	–	0	12	–	1	–	0
North Dakota	5	–	2	–	0	7	–	3	–	0
South Dakota *	4	–	2	–	1	6	–	5	–	0
Northern Colorado	4	–	3	–	0	5	–	3	–	1
Nebraska–Omaha	3	–	4	–	0	6	–	5	–	0
South Dakota State *	2	–	4	–	1	4	–	6	–	0
Augustana (SD)	2	–	5	–	0	4	–	7	–	0
Morningside	0	–	7	–	0	2	–	9	–	0
St. Cloud State †	0	–	0	–	0	4	–	5	–	0
Mankato State †	0	–	0	–	0	2	–	9	–	0
+ – Conference co-champions; ^ – NCAA Division II playoff participant; * – South Dakota and South Dakota State split two head-to-head games, which counted as a tie for each team in the conference standings. † – ineligible for the conference title; Rankings from NCAA Division II Football Committee poll

1982 Northern California Athletic Conference football standings
	Conf.					Overall
Team	W		L		T	W		L		T
No. 3 UC Davis $^	5	–	0	–	0	12	–	1	–	0
Sacramento State	3	–	2	–	0	8	–	3	–	0
Cal State Hayward	3	–	2	–	0	4	–	5	–	1
San Francisco State	2	–	3	–	0	4	–	6	–	0
Chico State	1	–	4	–	0	5	–	5	–	0
Humboldt State	1	–	4	–	0	3	–	7	–	0
$ – Conference champion; ^ – NCAA Division II playoff participant; Rankings from NCAA Division II Football Committee poll

1982 Northern Intercollegiate Conference football standings
	Conf.					Overall
Team	W		L		T	W		L		T
No. 6 Moorhead State $^	5	–	0	–	1	7	–	2	–	1
Minnesota Duluth	5	–	1	–	0	7	–	2	–	0
Minnesota Morris	3	–	2	–	1	4	–	4	–	2
Northern State	2	–	4	–	0	3	–	6	–	0
Southwest State (MN)	2	–	4	–	0	2	–	7	–	0
Bemidji State	2	–	4	–	0	2	–	8	–	0
Winona State	1	–	5	–	0	3	–	6	–	0
$ – Conference champion; ^ – NAIA Division I playoff participant; Rankings from NAIA Division I poll

1982 Pennsylvania State Athletic Conference football standings
	Conf.					Overall
Team	W		L		T	W		L		T
East Division
No. 10 East Stroudsburg xy$	6	–	0	–	0	9	–	2	–	0
West Chester	4	–	1	–	0	6	–	4	–	0
Millersville	4	–	2	–	0	5	–	4	–	0
Kutztown	2	–	4	–	0	4	–	6	–	0
Mansfield	1	–	3	–	1	3	–	6	–	1
Bloomsburg	1	–	4	–	1	1	–	7	–	1
Cheyney	1	–	5	–	0	2	–	6	–	0
West Division
Edinboro xy	5	–	1	–	0	9	–	1	–	0
Slippery Rock	4	–	2	–	0	7	–	3	–	0
Shippensburg	4	–	2	–	0	7	–	3	–	0
Clarion	3	–	3	–	0	7	–	3	–	0
IUP	3	–	3	–	0	4	–	6	–	0
Lock Haven	1	–	5	–	0	5	–	5	–	0
California (PA)	1	–	5	–	0	1	–	9	–	0
Championship: East Stroudsburg 24, Edinboro 22
$ – Conference champion; x – Division champion/co-champions; y – Championship game participant; California forfeited three wins, including conference wins over IUP and Lock Haven, and a non-conference tie with Mansfield.; Rankings from NCAA Division II Football Committee poll

1982 Western Football Conference standings
	Conf.					Overall
Team	W		L		T	W		L		T
Cal Poly $	4	–	0	–	0	6	–	5	–	0
Santa Clara	3	–	1	–	0	7	–	4	–	0
Cal State Northridge	2	–	2	–	0	4	–	7	–	0
Cal Poly Pomona	1	–	3	–	0	1	–	10	–	0
Portland State	0	–	4	–	0	2	–	9	–	0
$ – Conference champion

1982 Southern Intercollegiate Athletic Conference football standings
	Conf.					Overall
Team	W		L		T	W		L		T
Division II
No. 7 Fort Valley State x^	6	–	0	–	0	10	–	2	–	0
Alabama A&M	4	–	2	–	0	6	–	4	–	1
Morris Brown	4	–	2	–	0	7	–	4	–	0
Tuskegee	5	–	3	–	0	6	–	4	–	0
Morehouse	5	–	4	–	0	5	–	5	–	0
Savannah State	3	–	4	–	0	4	–	6	–	0
Clark	1	–	6	–	0	1	–	8	–	0
Albany State	1	–	5	–	0	1	–	9	–	0
Division III
Lane x	3	–	0	–	0	6	–	2	–	1
Knoxville	3	–	2	–	0	4	–	5	–	0
Fisk	0	–	4	–	0	1	–	7	–	0
Miles	1	–	5	–	0	1	–	9	–	0
x – Division champion/co-champions; ^ – NCAA Division II playoff participant; Rankings from 1982 NCAA Division II football rankings

1982 NCAA Division II independents football records
	Conf.			Overall
Team	W	L	T	W		L		T
No. 9 Southern Connecticut State		–		9	–	1	–	0
Eastern Washington		–		8	–	2	–	0
Saint Mary's		–		7	–	2	–	1
No. 6 Northern Michigan ^		–		8	–	3	–	0
Puget Sound		–		7	–	3	–	0
Central State (OH)		–		7	–	4	–	0
Liberty		–		7	–	4	–	0
Towson State		–		7	–	4	–	0
Arkansas–Pine Bluff		–		5	–	5	–	1
American International		–		4	–	6	–	0
New Haven		–		4	–	6	–	0
Morgan State		–		4	–	7	–	0
Kentucky State		–		2	–	9	–	0
Sonoma State		–		2	–	9	–	0
Central Connecticut		–		1	–	7	–	1
UCF		–		0	–	10	–	0
^ – NCAA Division II playoff participant; Rankings from NCAA Division II Football Committee poll

== Conference summaries ==
Conference Champions

Central Intercollegiate Athletic Association – Virginia Union
Great Lakes Intercollegiate Athletic Conference – Hillsdale
Gulf South Conference – Jacksonville State
Heartland Collegiate Conference – Ashland
Lone Star Conference – Southwest Texas State
Missouri Intercollegiate Athletic Association – Northeast Missouri State
North Central Conference – North Dakota State
Northern California Athletic Conference – UC Davis
Northern Intercollegiate Conference – Minnesota State–Moorhead
Pennsylvania State Athletic Conference – East Stroudsburg
Rocky Mountain Athletic Conference – Colorado Mesa
South Atlantic Conference – Carson-Newman
Southern Intercollegiate Athletic Conference – Fort Valley State

== Postseason ==
1982 NCAA Division II Football Championship
- Teams: 8
- Finals Site: Veterans Stadium; McAllen, TX
- Champion: Southwest Texas State; (2nd title, 2nd title game)
- Runner-up: UC Davis; (1st title game)
- Semifinalists: Jacksonville State; North Dakota State
- Winning coach: Jim Wacker; 2nd championship

The 1982 NCAA Division II Football Championship playoffs were the 10th single-elimination tournament to determine the national champion of men's NCAA Division II college football. The championship game was held at McAllen Veterans Memorial Stadium in McAllen, Texas, for the second time.

=== Playoff bracket ===
First round Campus sites
Southwest Texas State	27
Fort Valley State	6
Jacksonville State	34
Northeast Missouri State	21
North Dakota State	21
Virginia Union	20
UC Davis	42
Northern Michigan	21

Semifinals; Campus sites
Southwest Texas State	19
Jacksonville State	14
North Dakota State	14
UC Davis	19

Championship; McAllen Veterans Memorial Stadium; McAllen, TX
Southwest Texas State	34
UC Davis	9

== See also ==
- 1982 NAIA Division I football season
- 1982 NAIA Division II football season
