= Joe Prokop =

American football player (born 1960)

No. 11, 8, 6, 4, 7,
- Position: Punter

Personal information
- Born: July 7, 1960 (age 66); St. Paul, Minnesota, U.S.
- Listed height: 6 ft 2 in (1.88 m)
- Listed weight: 230 lb (104 kg)

Career information
- High school: White Bear Lake
- College: Cal Poly Pomona
- NFL draft: 1984: undrafted

Career history
- Los Angeles Rams (1984)*; New York Giants (1985)*; Green Bay Packers (1985); New York Jets (1986)*; San Diego Chargers (1987); New York Jets (1988–1990); San Francisco 49ers (1991); Miami Dolphins (1992); New York Giants (1992)
- * Offseason or practice squad member only
- Stats at Pro Football Reference

Joseph Michael Prokop is an American former professional football player who was a punter for seven seasons in the National Football League (NFL) for the Green Bay Packers, San Diego Chargers, New York Jets, San Francisco 49ers, Miami Dolphins, and New York Giants. He played college football for the Cal Poly Pomona Broncos.
