= Scott Reppert =

American football player (born 1960)

No. 9
- Position: Running back

Personal information
- Born: December 26, 1960 (age 65); Appleton, Wisconsin, U.S.
- Listed height: 5 ft 8 in (1.73 m)
- Listed weight: 185 lb (84 kg)

Career information
- High school: Appleton West (WI)

Awards and highlights
- Little All-America (1980–1982); Academic All-America (1981)
- College Football Hall of Fame (Class of 2003)

Scott "Scooter" Reppert (born December 26, 1960) is an American former football running back and businessman. He led Division III in rushing three consecutive years from 1980 to 1982 and was selected as a Little All-American each of those years. He was inducted into the College Football Hall of Fame in 2003. He later became a businessman and Chief Executive Officer of Superior Health Linens.

== Early life ==
Reppert was born in 1960 in Appleton, Wisconsin, and attended Appleton West High School.

== Lawrence University ==
Reppert enrolled at Lawrence University in Appleton and played college football there from 1979 to 1982. He led Division III in rushing yards per game three consecutive years from 1980 to 1982. He averaged 159.3 yards per game in 1980, 149.1 yards per game in 1981 (1,641 rushing yards and 16 touchdowns), and 165.3 yards per game in 1982. He had 23 100-yard games and five 200-yard games, including a career-high 252 yards against Coe College in 1981. He set 22 school records at Lawrence and led the Lawrence football team to a 33-5 record, including three Midwest Conference championships. He was a first-team Little All-American three years and also an Academic All-America in 1981 as selected by the College Sports Information Directors of America. Over his four years at Lawrence, Reppert totaled 4,442 rushing yards and 45 rushing touchdowns on 807 carries, an average of 5.5 yards per game.

Reppert also competed on Lawrence's track team in sprint and jump events. In November 1982, Sports Illustrated published a profile of Reppert touting both his performance on the football field and his community service work with special education children at a local elementary school. He graduated from Lawrence University in 1983 with a Bachelor's Degree in Psychology & Teacher Education.

== Legacy and later years ==
Reppert was inducted into the College Football Hall of Fame in 2003. He was the first player from the Midwest Conference to be inducted. He was also an inaugural inductee into the Lawrence Intercollegiate Athletic Hall of Fame. In 2021, he was also named to the Midwest Conference Centennial Top 100.

After graduating from Lawrence, Reppert received an offer from the Montreal Concordes. He also attended training camp with the Chicago Bears in 1983, played in exhibition games, and was released in September 1983. He played for the London Ravens during the 1985 and 1986 seasons until a knee injury ended his playing career. He then lived in Minnesota, Idaho, Tennessee, Illinois, and Wisconsin. He eventually became Chief Executive Officer of Superior Health Linens in Cudahy, Wisconsin from 2006 to 2018 and the owner of Big Bass Lake Resort in Eagle River, Wisconsin.
