= 1982 North Dakota State Bison football team =

American college football season

1982 North Dakota State Bison football

NCC champion

NCAA Division II Semifinal, L 14–19 vs. UC Davis
- Conference: North Central Conference
- Record: 12–1 (7–0 NCC)
- Head coach: Don Morton (4th season)
- Defensive coordinator: Mike Daly (4th season)
- Home stadium: Dacotah Field

1982 North Central Conference football standings
	Conf.					Overall
Team	W		L		T	W		L		T
No. 2 North Dakota State $^	7	–	0	–	0	12	–	1	–	0
North Dakota	5	–	2	–	0	7	–	3	–	0
South Dakota *	4	–	2	–	1	6	–	5	–	0
Northern Colorado	4	–	3	–	0	5	–	3	–	1
Nebraska–Omaha	3	–	4	–	0	6	–	5	–	0
South Dakota State *	2	–	4	–	1	4	–	6	–	0
Augustana (SD)	2	–	5	–	0	4	–	7	–	0
Morningside	0	–	7	–	0	2	–	9	–	0
St. Cloud State †	0	–	0	–	0	4	–	5	–	0
Mankato State †	0	–	0	–	0	2	–	9	–	0
+ – Conference co-champions; ^ – NCAA Division II playoff participant; * – South Dakota and South Dakota State split two head-to-head games, which counted as a tie for each team in the conference standings. † – ineligible for the conference title; Rankings from NCAA Division II Football Committee poll

The 1982 North Dakota State Bison football team was an American football team that represented North Dakota State University during the 1982 NCAA Division II football season as a member of the North Central Conference. In their fourth year under head coach Don Morton, the team compiled a 12–1 record, finished as NCC champion, and lost to UC Davis in the NCAA Division II Football Championship semifinals.

== Schedule ==
Date	Opponent	Rank	Site	Result	Attendance	Source
September 4	Northern Michigan*		Dacotah Field; Fargo, ND	W 20–3	8,850	
September 11	at Mankato State*		Blakeslee Stadium; Mankato, MN	W 45–17	3,802	
September 18	at North Dakota		Memorial Stadium; Grand Forks, ND (Nickel Trophy)	W 10–3	12,500	
September 25	Morningside	No. 2	Dacotah Field; Fargo, ND	W 42–14	11,000	
October 2	at South Dakota State	No. 1	Coughlin–Alumni Stadium; Brookings, SD (rivalry)	W 10–3	8,540	
October 9	at Augustana (SD)	No. 2	Howard Wood Field; Sioux Falls, SD	W 13–2	1,662	
October 16	South Dakota^{†}	No. 2	Dacotah Field; Fargo, ND	W 21–14	11,600	
October 23	at Nebraska–Omaha	No. 2	Al F. Caniglia Field; Omaha, NE	W 35–16	5,800	
October 30	Northern Colorado	No. 2	Dacotah Field; Fargo, ND	W 27–12	10,100	
November 6	Northern Iowa*	No. 2	Dacotah Field; Fargo, ND	W 12–7	6,100	
November 13	St. Cloud State*	No. 2	Dacotah Field; Fargo, ND	W 24–0	525	
November 27	No. 8 Virginia Union*	No. 2	Dacotah Field; Fargo, ND (NCAA Division II Quarterfinal)	W 21–20	4,300	
December 4	at No. 3 UC Davis*	No. 2	Toomey Field; Davis, CA (NCAA Division II Semifinal)	L 14–19	10,400	
*Non-conference game; ^{†}Homecoming; Rankings from NCAA Division II Football Committee Poll released prior to the game
