= 1982 Jacksonville State Gamecocks football team =

American college football season

1982 Jacksonville State Gamecocks football

GSC champion

NCAA Division II Semifinal, L 14–19 at Southwest Texas State
- Conference: Gulf South Conference
- Record: 10–2 (7–0 GSC)
- Head coach: Jim Fuller (6th season)
- Offensive coordinator: Jack White (4th season)
- Defensive coordinator: Jerry Beach (4th season)
- Home stadium: Paul Snow Stadium

1982 Gulf South Conference football standings
	Conf.					Overall
Team	W		L		T	W		L		T
No. 5 Jacksonville State $^	7	–	0	–	0	10	–	2	–	0
Mississippi College	6	–	1	–	0	8	–	3	–	0
North Alabama	4	–	3	–	0	7	–	3	–	0
Delta State	3	–	4	–	0	6	–	4	–	0
Livingston	3	–	4	–	0	6	–	4	–	0
Valdosta State	2	–	4	–	0	6	–	5	–	1
Troy State	2	–	5	–	0	2	–	8	–	0
Tennessee–Martin	0	–	6	–	0	5	–	6	–	0
$ – Conference champion; ^ – NCAA Division II playoff participant; Rankings from NCAA Division II Football Committee poll

The 1982 Jacksonville State Gamecocks football team represented Jacksonville State University as a member of the Gulf South Conference (GSC) during the 1982 NCAA Division II football season. Led by sixth-year head coach Jim Fuller, the Gamecocks compiled an overall record of 10–2 with a mark of 7–0 in conference play, and finished as GSC champion. In the playoffs, Jacksonville State were defeated by Southwest Texas State in the semifinals.

== Schedule ==
Date	Opponent	Rank	Site	Result	Attendance	Source
September 18	at Alabama A&M*		Milton Frank Stadium; Huntsville, AL	W 21–13	10,000	
September 25	at Liberty Baptist*	No. 8	City Stadium; Lynchburg, VA	W 42–13	4,731	
October 2	at No. 2 Livingston	No. 5	Tiger Stadium; Livingston, AL	W 34–7	8,200	
October 9	Mississippi College	No. T–3	Paul Snow Stadium; Jacksonville, AL	W 52–36	11,000	
October 16	Valdosta State	No. T–3	Paul Snow Stadium; Jacksonville, AL	W 43–11	7,500	
October 23	No. 19 (I-AA) Chattanooga*	No. 3	Paul Snow Stadium; Jacksonville, AL	L 0–28	12,500	
October 30	Delta State	No. 5	Paul Snow Stadium; Jacksonville, AL	W 56–36	12,000	
November 6	at Tennessee–Martin	No. 5	Pacer Stadium; Martin, TN	W 41–13	4,000	
November 13	Troy State	No. 5	Paul Snow Stadium; Jacksonville, AL (rivalry)	W 49–14	9,000	
November 20	No. T–9 North Alabama	No. 5	Paul Snow Stadium; Jacksonville, AL	W 28–10	8,000	
November 27	No. 4 Northeast Missouri State*	No. 5	Paul Snow Stadium; Jacksonville, AL (NCAA Division II Quarterfinal)	W 34–21	10,000	
December 4	at No. 1 Southwest Texas State*	No. 5	Bobcat Stadium; San Marcos, TX (NCAA Division II Semifinal)	L 14–19	7,500	
*Non-conference game; Rankings from NCAA Division II Football Committee Poll released prior to the game
