= Palm Bowl =

Palm Bowl (defunct)
- NAIA Football Championship (1978–1979); NCAA Division II Football Championship (1981–1985)
- Stadium: McAllen Veterans Memorial Stadium
- Location: McAllen, Texas

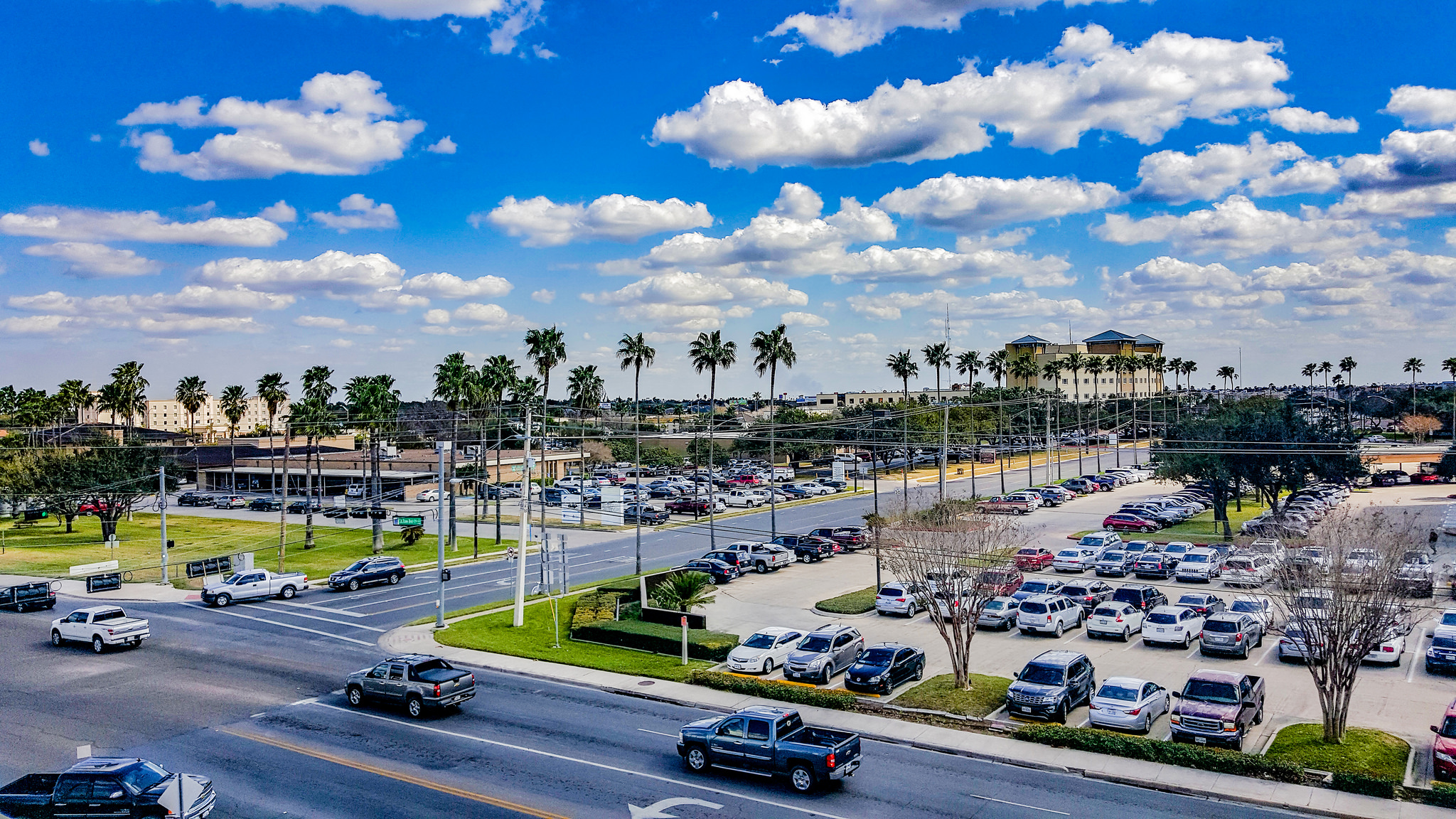
McAllen, Texas - City of Palms

The Palm Bowl was a football game played seven times at McAllen Veterans Memorial Stadium in McAllen, Texas between 1978 and 1985. The first two contests (1978 and 1979) decided the NAIA Football National Championship, and the last five (1981 through 1995) decided the NCAA Division II Football Championship. The bowl folded after the NCAA moved the Division II championship to Braly Municipal Stadium in Florence, Alabama in 1986.

== History ==
On October 26, 1978, the National Association for Intercollegiate Athletics (NAIA) and the McAllen Chamber of Commerce held a joint press conference announcing a "multi-year contract" for the bowl to host the NAIA football national championship. The game was initially called the City of Palms Bowl (after McAllen's nickname, the City of Palms) but the name was soon shortened to the less cumbersome Palm Bowl. McAllen officials were keen to use the game to attract tourism and actively sought to have it televised nationally. The 1979 game appeared on ESPN (then in its first year of operation) with a Goodyear blimp overhead.

In September 1980 the third edition of the bowl was cancelled because members of the Lone Star Conference, including Texas A&I (today Texas A&M Kingsville) and Southwest Texas State (today Texas State), the two football-playing colleges closest to McAllen, had begun to transition from the NAIA to NCAA Division II. Their departure from the NAIA led bowl organizers to conclude that "it wouldn't be feasible financially" for them to continue to host the NAIA championship in McAllen.

In May 1981, the bowl's organizers (by then incorporated as Palm Bowl, Inc.) secured the NCAA Division II championship game for McAllen. The five-year contract called for the bowl to be televised nationally on ABC, with a local blackout. The local press referred to the 1981 game as "Palm Bowl III," confirming that it was a resumption of the original bowl rather than an entirely new initiative. It drew the largest-ever Palm Bowl crowd (9,415) to see Southwest Texas State win the title. After another good turnout witnessed the Bobcats repeat in 1982, the next three games did not feature a Lone Star Conference team and attendance suffered as a result. North Dakota State ended up playing in four of the five Palm Bowls that decided the D-II title, winning two and losing two.

The NCAA's arrangement with the Palm Bowl expired after the 1985 game, and Florence, Alabama (home of 1985 runner-up North Alabama) outbid McAllen for the next contract. Palm Bowl, Inc., cited uncertainty over whether the game would continue to be televised nationally as the reason for not submitting a more competitive bid. The organization was still in the black financially when it dissolved, after failing to attract another game to be held under the Palm Bowl name.

== Game results ==
Date	Winner		Loser		Title	Attendance	Notes
December 16, 1978	Angelo State	34	Elon	14	NAIA championship	8,443	
December 15, 1979	Texas A&I	20	Central State (OK)	14	NAIA championship		
December 12, 1981	Southwest Texas State	42	North Dakota State	13	Division II championship	9,415	
December 11, 1982	Southwest Texas State	34	UC Davis	9	Division II championship	8,000	
December 10, 1983	North Dakota State	41	Central State (OH)	21	Division II championship	5,275	
December 8, 1984	Troy State	18	North Dakota State	17	Division II championship	4,500	
December 14, 1985	North Dakota State	35	North Alabama	7	Division II championship	6,000	
