= 1982 Southwest Texas State Bobcats football team =

American college football season

1982 Southwest Texas State Bobcats football

NCAA Division II champion LSC champion

NCAA Division II Championship Game, W 34–9 vs. UC Davis
- Conference: Lone Star Conference
- Record: 14–0 (7–0 LSC)
- Head coach: Jim Wacker (4th season)
- Offensive scheme: I formation
- Defensive coordinator: Tom Mueller (4th season)
- Base defense: 5–2
- Home stadium: Bobcat Stadium

1982 Lone Star Conference football standings
	Conf.					Overall
Team	W		L		T	W		L		T
No. 1 Southwest Texas State $^	7	–	0	–	0	14	–	0	–	0
Angelo State	4	–	3	–	0	7	–	3	–	0
East Texas State	4	–	3	–	0	6	–	4	–	0
Abilene Christian	4	–	3	–	0	6	–	4	–	0
Stephen F. Austin	4	–	3	–	0	6	–	5	–	0
Texas A&I	2	–	5	–	0	5	–	6	–	0
Howard Payne	1	–	6	–	0	3	–	7	–	0
Sam Houston State	1	–	6	–	0	3	–	8	–	0
$ – Conference champion; ^ – NCAA Division II playoff participant; Rankings from NCAA Division II Football Committee poll

The 1982 Southwest Texas State Bobcats football team was an American football team that represented Southwest Texas State University—now known as Texas State University–as a member of the Lone Star Conference (LSC) during the 1982 NCAA Division II football season. Led by fourth-year head coach Jim Wacker, Southwest Texas State compiled an overall record of 14–0 and claimed the LSC title with a conference mark of 7–0. They won their second consecutive NCAA Division II Football Championship with a win over UC Davis, 34–9, in the Palm Bowl.

== Schedule ==
Date	Opponent	Rank	Site	Result	Attendance	Source
September 4	Lamar*		Bobcat Stadium; San Marcos, TX	W 30–0	11,000	
September 11	Prairie View A&M*		Bobcat Stadium; San Marcos, TX	W 35–7	11,700	
September 18	Nicholls State*		Bobcat Stadium; San Marcos, TX (rivalry)	W 14–7	9,000	
October 2	at Southeastern Louisiana*		Strawberry Stadium; Hammond, LA	W 34–21	4,000	
October 9	Howard Payne	No. 1	Bobcat Stadium; San Marcos, TX	W 31–3	11,600	
October 16	vs. Sam Houston State	No. 1	Houston Astrodome; Houston, TX (rivalry)	W 52–21	12,500–13,500	
October 23	Stephen F. Austin	No. 1	Bobcat Stadium; San Marcos, TX	W 31–21	11,530	
October 30	at East Texas State	No. 1	Memorial Stadium; Commerce, TX	W 38–34	7,500	
November 6	Angelo State	No. 1	Bobcat Stadium; San Marcos, TX	W 42–16	16,200	
November 13	at Abilene Christian	No. 1	Bobcat Stadium; San Marcos, TX	W 14–13	11,758	
November 20	at Texas A&I	No. 1	Javelina Stadium; Kingsville, TX	W 45–27	13,500	
November 27	No. 7 Fort Valley State*	No. 1	Bobcat Stadium; San Marcos, TX (NCAA Division II Quarterfinal)	W 27–6		
December 4	No. 5 Jacksonville State*	No. 1	Bobcat Stadium; San Marcos, TX (NCAA Division II Semifinal)	W 19–14	7,500	
December 11	vs. No. 3 UC Davis*	No. 1	McAllen Veterans Memorial Stadium; McAllen, TX (NCAA Division II Championship—Palm Bowl)	W 34–9		
*Non-conference game; Rankings from NCAA Division II Football Committee Poll released prior to the game
