= Next College Student Athlete =

American for-profit organization

Next College Student Athlete (NCSA)
- Formerly: National College Scouting Association
- Type: Privately held
- Industry: Education and Sports
- Founded: 2000
- Headquarters: Chicago, Illinois
- Key people: Chris Krause: Founder, CEO Lisa Strasman: President
- Products: College athletic recruiting
- Number of employees: 750+
- Parent: IMG Academy
- Website: ncsasports.org

Next College Student Athlete (NCSA) is a for-profit organization that connects middle and high school student-athletes with college coaches. NCSA teaches middle and high school student-athletes about the college recruiting process. As of 2025, the organization has more than 750 employees.

NCSA Athletic Recruiting was included in the 2012 Inc. 5000, and in the top 20 of Crain's Fast Fifty in both 2013 and 2012.

== History ==
Chris Krause grew up in Chicago, Illinois, where he played high school football. Chris Krause later played collegiate football at Vanderbilt University, where he was a linebacker and nose guard. Finding the recruiting process difficult to navigate as a student, he founded NCSA Athletic Recruiting. Krause set out to bring recruiting technology together to help high school athletes gain exposure to a network of coaches. The NCSA gives students options that lead to careers after college.

NCSA has over 350 former college athletes on staff, including Sue Enquist, Tunde Oshinowo and Cecil Martin. They have also helped many athletes such as Bryan Bulaga, Patrick Brown and Jason Straight.

Following his collegiate career, Chris Krause began working for recruiting service, College Prospects in the Chicago region. Chris Krause founded the National Collegiate Scouting Association (NCSA) in 2000.

== Services ==
The NCSA Athletic Recruiting team consists of coaches, scouts and former college athletes. NCSA Athletic Recruiting teaches student-athletes and their parents about college recruiting. NCSA Athletic Recruiting gives each student-athlete his/her own recruiting profile. On this profile, the student-athlete can create a public page to display his/her talents. Student-athletes' academic grades and athleticism are evaluated by NCSA Athletic Recruiting scouts. With this information, the scouts compose a list of colleges each student-athlete can realistically consider to both make the team and receive financial aid.

In 2008, NCSA Athletic Recruiting assisted almost 4,000 high school seniors. In 2011, over 7,000 eighth-graders joined the NCSA network. The same year, nearly 1,400 seventh-graders joined the network. Through custom technology, 2024 was a record year for NCSA where they had over 31,000 2024 graduates go on to play their sport in college. NCSA Athletic Recruiting has helped over 300,000 student-athletes obtain $2.4 billion in grants, aid and scholarships. As of 2020, 1% to 2% of undergraduate students in bachelor's degree programs were receiving athletic scholarships.

NCSA has optional additional services that range in cost from hundreds to thousands of dollars.

== Awards and recognition ==
- 2013 Crain's Fast Fifty #13
- 2012 Crain's Fast Fifty #20
- 2012 Inc. 5000 #1378
  - #24 in Education
  - #61 in Illinois
  - #56 in Chicago Metro Area
- 2012 Chicago's 101 Best and Brightest Companies to Work For
