= Western Football Conference (United States) =

Now-defunct NCAA Division II college football conference

- Conference: NCAA
- Division: II
- Region: Pacific coast

The Western Football Conference was an NCAA Division II scholarship-awarding football conference that existed from 1982 to 1993.

Among its member schools were (from 1982 to 1992 unless otherwise noted):

- Santa Clara
- Cal Poly SLO
- Cal State Northridge
- Cal Lutheran (1985–1989)
- Sacramento State (1985–1992)
- Southern Utah (1986–1992)
- Portland State
- Cal Poly Pomona (1982)

The first discussion of the formation of the league was held by administrators in 1976. Its founding, and only, commissioner was Vic Buccola, who had been the athletic director at Cal Poly from 1973 to 1981. He then became a founder and commissioner of the multi-sport American West Conference, which was chartered after the WFC folded in 1993.

The WFC folded in part because of a new NCAA rule that prohibited member institutions who competed at the Division I (D-I) level in other sports from competing at the Division II (D-II) level in football. Cal State Northridge, Cal Poly SLO, Southern Utah, and Sacramento State, plus UC Davis for football, were the first announced members of the American West Conference.

Of the eight WFC member schools:

- Four (Cal Poly SLO, Sacramento State, Southern Utah, and Portland State) are currently members of the Division I FCS Big Sky Conference.
- One (California Lutheran) is a member of the Division III Southern California Intercollegiate Athletic Conference (SCIAC).
- Three have dropped football as a varsity sport: Cal Poly Pomona ahead of the 1983 season, Santa Clara in 1993, and CSUN in 2001 (following a brief stint in the Big Sky). In all other sports, Cal Poly Pomona is currently a member of the Division II California Collegiate Athletic Association, Santa Clara is a member of the Division I West Coast Conference, and Northridge is a member of the Division I Big West Conference.

The WFC Scholar-Athlete of the Year Award was named for Santa Clara coach Pat Malley. Its recipients include:

- 1987: Tracy Morris Downs, M.D., Cal Lutheran
