= Cal Poly Pomona Broncos =

College sports team

- University: California State Polytechnic University, Pomona
- Nickname: Broncos
- NCAA: Division II
- Conference: CCAA
- Athletic director: Brian Swanson
- Location: Pomona, California
- Varsity teams: 11 (5 men's, 6 women's)
- Basketball arena: Kellogg Arena
- Baseball stadium: Scolinos Field
- Soccer stadium: Kellogg Stadium
- Colors
- Mascot: Billy Bronco
- Fight song: William Tell Overture
- Website: broncoathletics.com
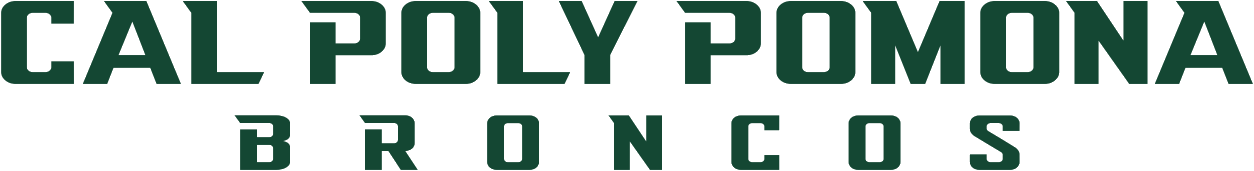

Team NCAA championships
- 15

Individual and relay NCAA champions
- 25

The Cal Poly Pomona Broncos or Cal Poly Broncos are the athletic sports teams for the California State Polytechnic University, Pomona (Cal Poly Pomona).

Cal Poly Pomona has 11 varsity sports teams and offers student participation in a wide range of sports including baseball, basketball, cross country, soccer, track and field, and volleyball. Cal Poly Pomona participates at the NCAA's Division II (DII) level in the California Collegiate Athletic Association (CCAA).

The Broncos have 107 CCAA championships (regular season and tournament titles) and 15 National Championships. Current and former Cal Poly Pomona athletes have won 7 Olympic medals (3 gold, 1 silver, and 3 bronze). As of 2024, Cal Poly ranks 9th in the nation in NCAA Division II Next College Student Athlete (NCSA) Power Rankings that calculate rankings based on NCSA recruiting network, general academic rankings by U.S. News & World Report Best Colleges, Integrated Postsecondary Education Data System (IPEDS) graduation rates and IPEDS average cost after aid.

== Varsity teams ==
| Men's sports | Women's sports |
|---|---|
| Basketball | Basketball |
| Cross country | Cross country |
| Soccer | Soccer |
| Track and field | Track and field^{1} |
| Baseball | Volleyball |
^{1} – includes both indoor and outdoor

== NCAA Appearances ==
The Cal Poly Pomona Broncos have competed in the NCAA Tournament across 11 active sports (5 men's and 6 women's) 200 times at the Division II level.

- Baseball (16): 1976 • 1979 • 1980 • 1983 • 1985 • 1988 • 1993 • 2011 • 2014 • 2015 • 2016 • 2017 • 2019 • 2022 • 2023 • 2024
- Men's Basketball (17): 1962 • 1964 • 1976 • 2003 • 2004 • 2005 • 2007 • 2009 • 2010 • 2013 • 2014 • 2015 • 2016 • 2018 • 2019 • 2020 • 2022
- Women's Basketball (30): 1982 • 1983 • 1984 • 1985 • 1986 • 1987 • 1988 • 1989 • 1990 • 1991 • 1992 • 1993 • 1997 • 1998 • 1999 • 2000 • 2001 • 2002 • 2004 • 2005 • 2010 • 2011 • 2012 • 2014 • 2015 • 2019 • 2020 • 2023 • 2024 • 2025
- Men's Cross Country (25): 1967 • 1983 • 1984 • 1985 • 1986 • 1988 • 1990 • 1992 • 1994 • 1996 • 1997 • 2003 • 2004 • 2005 • 2006 • 2013 • 2014 • 2015 • 2016 • 2018 • 2019 • 2021 • 2023 • 2024 • 2025
- Women's Cross Country (6): 1985 • 2010 • 2016 • 2017 • 2019 • 2025
- Men's Soccer (10): 1998 • 2015 • 2016 • 2017 • 2018 • 2019 • 2021 • 2022 • 2023 • 2024
- Women's Soccer (6): 1999 • 2001 • 2012 • 2014 • 2019 • 2024
- Men's Outdoor Track and Field (43): 1965 • 1967 • 1968 • 1971 • 1972 • 1973 • 1975 • 1976 • 1977 • 1978 • 1980 • 1981 • 1982 • 1984 • 1986 • 1987 • 1988 • 1989 • 1991 • 1992 • 1993 • 1994 • 1995 • 1996 • 1997 • 1999 • 2000 • 2002 • 2004 • 2005 • 2007 • 2009 • 2011 • 2012 • 2014 • 2015 • 2017 • 2018 • 2019 • 2022 • 2023 • 2024 • 2025
- Women's Outdoor Track and Field (34): 1982 • 1983 • 1984 • 1985 • 1986 • 1987 • 1988 • 1989 • 1990 • 1991 • 1992 • 1993 • 1994 • 1995 • 1996 • 1997 • 1998 • 1999 • 2002 • 2004 • 2006 • 2007 • 2008 • 2009 • 2013 • 2014 • 2016 • 2017 • 2018 • 2019 • 2022 • 2023 • 2024 • 2025
- Women's Volleyball (20): 1983 • 1984 • 1985 • 1988 • 1990 • 1991 • 1992 • 1993 • 1994 • 1996 • 1997 • 2004 • 2005 • 2007 • 2008 • 2018 • 2021 • 2022 • 2023 • 2024

== Team National Titles ==
The Broncos have won 13 NCAA championships at the Division II level, as well as two in the AIAW.

- Men's (5)
  - Baseball (3): 1976 • 1980 • 1983
  - Basketball (1): 2010
  - Cross Country (1): 1983
- Women's (10)
  - Basketball (5): 1982 • 1985 • 1986 • 2001 • 2002
  - Soccer (1): 2024
  - Tennis (4): 1980 (AIAW) • 1981 (AIAW) • 1991 • 1992

Results

| School year | Sport | Opponent | Score |
|---|---|---|---|
| 1975–76 | Baseball | SIU Edwardsville | 17–3 |
| 1979–80 | Baseball | New Haven | 13–6 |
| 1981–82 | Women's basketball | Tuskegee | 93–74 |
| 1982–83 | Baseball | Jacksonville State | 9–7 |
| 1983–84 | Men's cross country | St. Cloud State | 86–100 |
| 1984–85 | Women's basketball | Central Missouri | 80–69 |
| 1985–86 | Women's basketball | North Dakota State | 70–63 |
| 1990–91 | Women's tennis | UC Davis | 5–3 |
| 1991–92 | Women's tennis | Grand Canyon | 5–0 |
| 2000–01 | Women's basketball | North Dakota | 87–80 |
| 2001–02 | Women's basketball | SE Oklahoma State | 74–62 |
| 2009–10 | Men's basketball | IUP | 65–53 |
| 2024 | Women's soccer | Minnesota State | 2–1 |

Below is one national club team championship:

- Co-ed Roller Hockey (1): 2003 (NCRHA)

== Individual National Titles ==
Cal Poly Pomona has 25 individual national titles at the Division II level.

NCAA individual championships
| Order | School year | Athlete(s) | Sport | Source |
|---|---|---|---|---|
| 1 | 1966–67 | Frank Sanfilippo | Men's outdoor track and field | |
| 2 | 1971–72 | Steve Lauriano | Men's outdoor track and field | |
| 3 | 1972–73 | James Couch | Men's outdoor track and field | |
| 4 | 1976–77 | Jeff Russell | Men's outdoor track and field | |
| 5 | 1981–82 | Jodi Mabb | Women's gymnastics | |
| 6 | 1983–84 | Janet Nicholls | Women's outdoor track and field | |
| 7 | 1985–86 | Debra Larsen | Women's outdoor track and field | |
| 8 | 1986–87 | Xenia Anastasiadou | Women's tennis | |
| 9 | 1987–88 | Xenia Anastasiadou | Women's tennis | |
| 10 | 1987–88 | Brandi Gail | Women's outdoor track and field | |
| 11 | 1987–88 | Angel Roman | Men's outdoor track and field | |
| 12 | 1987–88 | Durelle Schimek | Women's outdoor track and field | |
| 13 | 1987–88 | Durelle Schimek | Women's outdoor track and field | |
| 14 | 1988–89 | Durelle Schimek | Women's outdoor track and field | |
| 15 | 1988–89 | Doris Williams | Women's outdoor track and field | |
| 16 | 1988–89 | Marvin Williams | Men's outdoor track and field | |
| 17 | 1989–90 | Doris Williams | Women's outdoor track and field | |
| 18 | 1990–91 | Onnaca Heron; Cindy Hamnquist | Women's tennis | |
| 19 | 1990–91 | Jakki Henderson | Women's outdoor track and field | |
| 20 | 1990–91 | Don Parish | Men's outdoor track and field | |
| 21 | 1992–93 | Steve Kobold; Oscar Mancisidor | Men's tennis | |
| 22 | 1993–94 | DeVon Edwards | Men's outdoor track and field | |
| 23 | 1997–98 | Tabreshia Lawrence | Women's outdoor track and field | |
| 24 | 1997–98 | Ruth Moecks | Women's outdoor track and field | |
| 25 | 2014–15 | Justin Ellerbee | Men's outdoor track and field | |

At the NCAA Division I level, Cal Poly Pomona is partially recognized for 1 individual championship - Eduardo Labastida who won a boxing title in 1957 in the 112-pound weight class. Labastida attended the Cal Poly San Luis Obispo campus, which didn't officially separate from Cal Poly Pomona until 1966. Cal Poly Pomona Athletics does not recognize this title, as Labastida is a member of the Cal Poly San Luis Obispo Athletics Hall of Fame.

== Conference Championships ==
=== CCAA regular season championships (86) ===
Cal Poly Pomona has won CCAA regular season championships in the following events:

- Men's sports (34):
  - Men's Water Polo (5) - 1974, 1975, 1976, 1977, 1978
  - Men's baseball (9) - 1976, 1979, 1980, 1983, 1985, 1988, 1991, 2015, 2016
  - Men's Basketball (7) - 1980-81, 2004–05, 2008–09, 2009–10, 2012–13, 2017-18, 2018-19
  - Men's Cross Country (5) - 1983, 1985, 1994, 1996, 1997
  - Men's Outdoor Track & Field (6) - 1972, 1997, 1998, 2022, 2023, 2024
  - Men's Soccer (2) - 2014*, 2018, 2024
- Women's sports (52):
  - Women's Basketball (25) - 1976-77, 1977-78, 1978-79, 1979-80, 1980-81, 1981-82, 1982–83, 1983–84, 1984–85, 1985–86, 1986–87, 1987–88, 1988–89, 1989–90, 1990–91, 1991–92, 1992–93, 1993–94, 1996–97, 1997–98, 1999–00, 2000–01, 2001–02, 2013–14, 2025-26
  - Women's Soccer (5) - 1991, 1999, 2023, 2024, 2025
  - Women's Tennis (11) - 1983, 1985, 1987, 1990, 1991, 1992, 1993, 1994, 1997, 1998, 2003
  - Women's Outdoor Track & Field (6) - 1997, 1998, 2022, 2023, 2024, 2025
  - Women's Volleyball (5) - 1981, 1990, 2005, 2024, 2025

=== CCAA Tournament championships (22) ===
Cal Poly Pomona has won CCAA tournament championships in the following events:

- Men's sports (8):
  - Baseball (3): 2015, 2019, 2022
  - Men's Basketball (2) - 2013, 2015
  - Men's Soccer (3) - 2014, 2015, 2019
- Women's sports (14):
  - Women's Basketball (11) - 1986, 1987, 1988, 1989, 1990, 1991, 1992, 1993, 1997, 1998, 2011
  - Women's Soccer (2) - 1999, 2024
  - Volleyball (1) - 2022

*CPP forced to vacate CCAA Regular Season title in 2014, determined ineligible for NCAA Tournament at season's end.

== Olympics ==
=== Olympic medalists ===
| Games | Gold medal | Silver medal | Bronze medal | Total |
|---|---|---|---|---|
| Kim Rhode | 3 | 1 | 2 | 6 |
| Chi Cheng | 0 | 0 | 1 | 1 |
| Kathy Smallwood-Cook | 0 | 0 | 3 | 3 |
| Total | 3 | 1 | 6 | 10 |

== Former sports ==
=== Football ===
Cal Poly Pomona fielded a college football team in Division II through the 1982 season. Jim Zorn was the Broncos' quarterback in 1973 and 1974; he played in the NFL for a decade, most notably as the starter for the expansion Seattle Seahawks.

=== Softball ===
While in existence, the Broncos' softball team appeared in seven Women's College World Series, in 1978, 1979, 1980, 1984, 1985, 1988 and 1989. The team played in the Big West, a current Division I conference. When the Big West terminated Pomona's affiliation with the conference, Cal Poly Pomona determined they did not want to drop the program to Division II, nor play an independent schedule, thus discontinuing the sport in 1993. While there are no active plans to revive the sport, it's cited as a possibility by Brian Swanson, the current athletic director.

== Club sports ==
There are currently 8 club sports at Cal Poly Pomona that are not affiliated with the Athletics department.

- Basketball
- Soccer
- Volleyball
- Tennis
- Cycling
- Roller Hockey
- Martial Arts
- Ultimate Frisbee

All students may only participate in any clubs/activities with a 3.0 GPA or higher.

== Bronco Pep Band ==
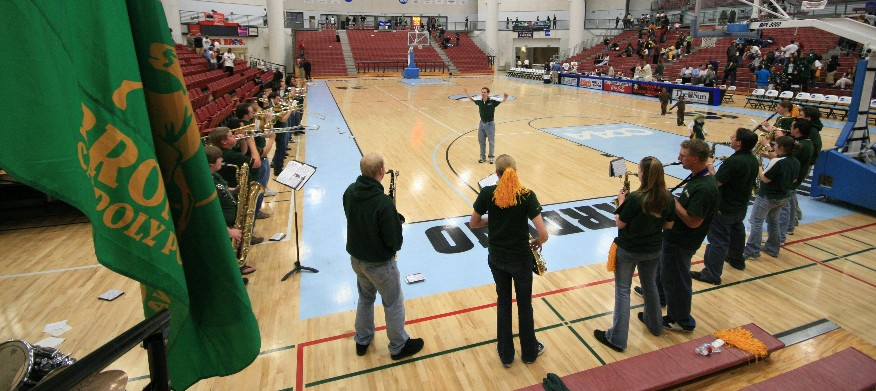
The Bronco Pep Band Victory Arc at the CCAA Division II basketball tournament

The Bronco Pep Band is a student-run band at the university. The band is currently a group within the Athletics Department.

Cal Poly Pomona music department student Daniel Sandt became the first director of what became known as "Bronco Pep Band version 2.0".

=== Directors ===
- Daniel Sandt (2002–2005)
- Steven Corral (2005–2009)
- James Rodriguez (2009-2012)
- Branden Herron (2012-2014)
- Ramiro Castañeda (2014-2016)
- Kingsley Hickman (2016-2018)
- Viral Shukla (2018–2020)
- Omar Arellano (2020–2023)
- Stevie Bolanos (2023-2024)
- Manny Gonzalez (2023-2025)
- Kit Rugprayoon (2025-Present)

== Fight song ==
=== The first fight song ===
Song of the Viking
Words by Jerry Voorhis, Sung to the tune of The Maine Stein Song

=== The new fight song ===
William Tell Overture
Cesare Sodero's band performs part 3 (Ranz des vaches) of the overture in 1914.

Cal Poly Pomona Fight Song
Words sung to the trio section of John Philip Sousa's "Solid Men to the Front".

=== Unofficial Fight Song ===
The finale of the overture to the opera William Tell has served as the university's fight song.

== See also ==
- Cal Poly Pomona Broncos men's basketball
