= 1982 NCAA Division II football rankings =

The 1982 NCAA Division II football rankings are from the NCAA Division II football committee. This is for the 1982 season.

== Legend ==
| | Increase in ranking |
| | Decrease in ranking |
| | Not ranked previous week |
| (#–#) | Win–loss record |
| (Italics) | Number of first place votes |
| т | Tied with team above or below also with this symbol |

== NCAA Division II Football Committee poll ==
| | Week 1 Sept 22 | Week 2 Sept 29 | Week 3 Oct 6 | Week 4 Oct 13 | Week 5 Oct 20 | Week 6 Oct 27 | Week 7 Nov 3 | Week 8 Nov 10 | Week 9 Nov 17 | Week 10 Nov 24 | |
|---|---|---|---|---|---|---|---|---|---|---|---|
| 1. | Southwest Texas State (3–0) | North Dakota State (4–0) | Southwest Texas State (4–0) | Southwest Texas State (5–0) | Southwest Texas State (6–0) | Southwest Texas State (7–0) | Southwest Texas State (8–0) | Southwest Texas State (9–0) | Southwest Texas State (10–0) | Southwest Texas State (11–0) | 1. |
| 2. | North Dakota State (3–0) | Livingston (4–0) | North Dakota State (5–0) | North Dakota State (6–0) | North Dakota State (7–0) | North Dakota State (8–0) | North Dakota State (7–0) | North Dakota State (10–0) | North Dakota State (11–0) | North Dakota State (11–0) | 2. |
| 3. | Livingston (3–0) | Santa Clara (3–0) | Jacksonville State (3–0) т | Jacksonville State (4–0) т | Jacksonville State (5–0) | UC Davis (6–0) | UC Davis (6–1) | UC Davis (8–0) | UC Davis (9–0) | UC Davis (10–0) | 3. |
| 4. | Abilene Christian (2–0–1) | North Carolina Central (3–0) | Santa Clara (4–0) т | Santa Clara (5–0) т | UC Davis (5–0) | Northeast Missouri State (6–1) | Northeast Missouri State (6–1) | Northeast Missouri State (7–1) | Northeast Missouri State (8–1) | Northeast Missouri State (9–1) | 4. |
| 5. | Shippensburg (2–0) | Jacksonville State (2–0) | North Carolina Central (4–0) | Northern Colorado (4–0–1) | Northern Michigan (6–1) | Jacksonville State (5–1) | Jacksonville State (6–1) | Jacksonville State (7–1) | Jacksonville State (8–1) | Jacksonville State (9–1) | 5. |
| 6. | Santa Clara (2–0) | Texas A&I (3–1) | Texas A&I (3–1) | North Carolina Central (4–1) т | Southern Connecticut State (6–0) | Santa Clara (6–1) | Virginia Union (7–1) | North Alabama (7–1) | Northern Michigan (8–2) | Northern Michigan (8–2) | 6. |
| 7. | North Carolina Central (3–0) | Southern Connecticut State (3–0) | Southern Connecticut State (4–0) | Northern Michigan (5–1) т | North Carolina Central (5–1) | Virginia Union (5–1) | North Alabama (6–2) | Northern Michigan (8–2) | Fort Valley State (9–1) | Fort Valley State (10–1) | 7. |
| 8. | Jacksonville State (1–0) | Northern Michigan (3–1) | Northern Michigan (4–1) | Southern Connecticut State (5–0) т | Northern Colorado (5–0–1) | Edinboro (7–0) | North Dakota (7–2) т | Fort Valley State (8–1) т | Virginia Union (7–2) | Virginia Union (8–2) | 8. |
| 9. | North Dakota (2–1) | Northern Colorado (2–0–1) | Northern Colorado (3–0–1) | UC Davis (4–0) (Note: In the actual printed polls, UC Davis was listed as California Davis) | Northeast Missouri State (5–1) | Livingston (6–1) | Northern Michigan (7–1) т | East Stroudsburg (8–1) т | Edinboro (9–1) т | Southern Connecticut State (9–1) | 9. |
| 10. | Northeast Missouri State (2–1) | Angelo State (3–0) | Edinboro (4–0) | Abilene Christian (3–1–1) т | Edinboro (6–0) т | North Alabama (6–1) | Ashland | Virginia Union (6–2) | North Alabama (7–2) т | East Stroudsburg (9–2) | 10. |
| 11. | | | | Edinboro (5–0) т | Santa Clara (5–1) т | | | | | | 11. |
| | Week 1 Sept 22 | Week 2 Sept 29 | Week 3 Oct 6 | Week 4 Oct 13 | Week 5 Oct 20 | Week 6 Oct 27 | Week 7 Nov 3 | Week 8 Nov 10 | Week 9 Nov 17 | Week 10 Nov 24 | |
| | | Dropped: 1 Southwest Texas State; 4 Abilene Christian; 5 Shippensburg; 9 North Dakota; 10 Northeast Missouri State | Dropped: 2 Livingston; 10 Angelo State | Dropped: 6 Texas A&I | Dropped: 10 Abilene Christian | Dropped: 5 Northern Michigan; 6 Southern Connecticut State; 7 North Carolina Central; 8 Northern Colorado | Dropped: 6 Santa Clara; 8 Edinboro; 9 Livingston | Dropped: 8 North Dakota; 10 Ashland | Dropped: 9 East Stroudsburg | Dropped: 9 Edinboro; 10 North Alabama | |
