= California Lutheran University =

Private university in Thousand Oaks, California, US

Coordinates: 34°13′29″N 118°52′44″W

- Former name: California Lutheran College (1959–1986)
- Type: Private university
- Established: 1959; 67 years ago
- Accreditation: WSCUC
- Religious affiliation: Evangelical Lutheran Church in America
- Endowment: $144.05 million (2024)
- President: John A. Nunes
- Faculty: 437 (193 full time, 244 part time)
- Undergraduates: 2,888
- Postgraduates: 1,394
- Location: Thousand Oaks, California, United States
- Campus: Suburban – 290 acres (1.2 km^{2})
- Colors: Purple and gold
- Nicknames: Kingsmen (men); Regals (women)
- Sporting affiliations: NCAA Division III; Southern California Intercollegiate Athletic Conference (SCIAC)
- Website: www.callutheran.edu
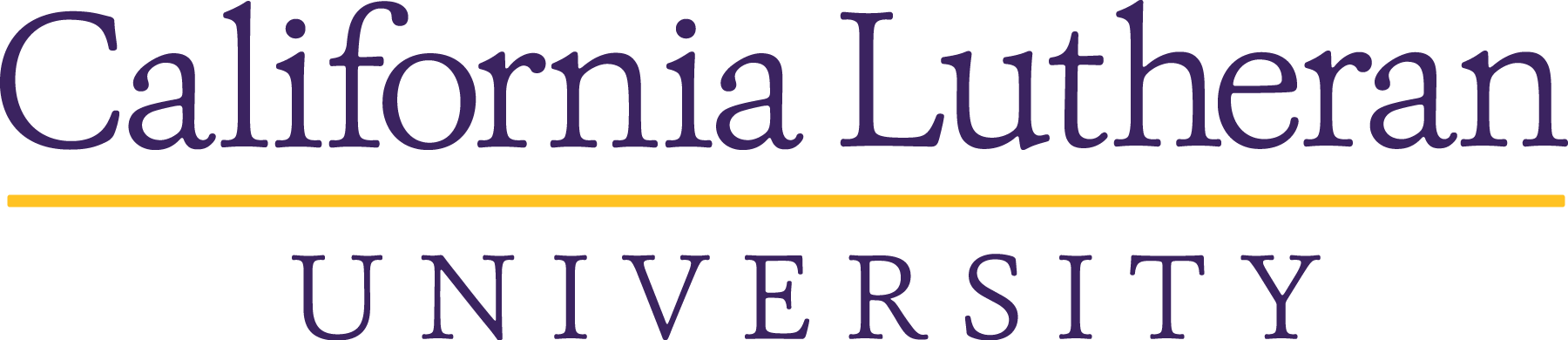

California Lutheran University (CLU, Cal Lutheran, or Cal Lu) is a private university in Thousand Oaks, California, United States. It was founded in 1959 and is affiliated with the Evangelical Lutheran Church in America, but is nonsectarian. It opened in 1960 as California Lutheran College and was the first four-year private college in Ventura County. It changed its name to California Lutheran University on January 1, 1986.

It is located on a 290-acre (120 ha) campus, 40 miles (64 km) northwest of Los Angeles. It offers degrees at the bachelor's, master's, and doctoral levels, as well as post-master's and post-bachelor's certificates. CLU offers 36 majors and 34 minors. The university is based in Thousand Oaks, with additional locations in Woodland Hills (Los Angeles), Westlake Village, Oxnard, Santa Maria, and Berkeley.

Cal Lutheran has been called the West Coast's "Cradle of Coaches"; nearly one in four of football coach Bob Shoup's players would go on to coach at some level, while 144 players have become football coaches, and several have been drafted to the National Football League. Particularly many players were drafted following the NAIA Championship win in 1971. The celebration was held at the Hollywood Palladium in conjunction with the Dallas Cowboys that won their first Super Bowl the following month. In college baseball, 24 student players have been drafted for Major League Baseball as of 2014.

== History ==
California Lutheran College (CLC) was constructed in the early 1960s on nearly 300 acres (120 ha) of land in northern Thousand Oaks. Much of the land had been donated by Richard Pederson, the son of Norwegian immigrants and a member of the Norwegian Colony. Pederson donated 130 acres (53 ha), while more was purchased from other ranchers. The original $2.1 million campus first constructed a swimming pool, and soon also dormitories, administrative offices, and classrooms. The college first opened in September 1961 with an enrollment of 330 students and had reached 1400 students ten years later. It became fully accredited within its first year. In 1963, the Community Leaders Club was established in order to bring the town and college closer together. The group conducted annual auctions, staged events, assisted athletic programs, etc. Nearly half of its faculty held doctoral degrees by the early 1970s. The largest gift in the school's history was received from Clifford and Alma Pearson, who donated $1 million in 1985 to help establish the Pearson Library. California Lutheran University remained the only four-year university in Ventura County as of 1989. In 1995, CLU was the only four-year university in Ventura County.

Notable visitors to CLU events include U.S. presidents Ronald Reagan in 1979 and Gerald Ford in 1981; Bob Hope in 1984; Nicaraguan president Violeta Barrios de Chamorro in 1991; President George H. W. Bush in 1990; and former secretary of state Condoleezza Rice in 2018.

=== Background and origins ===
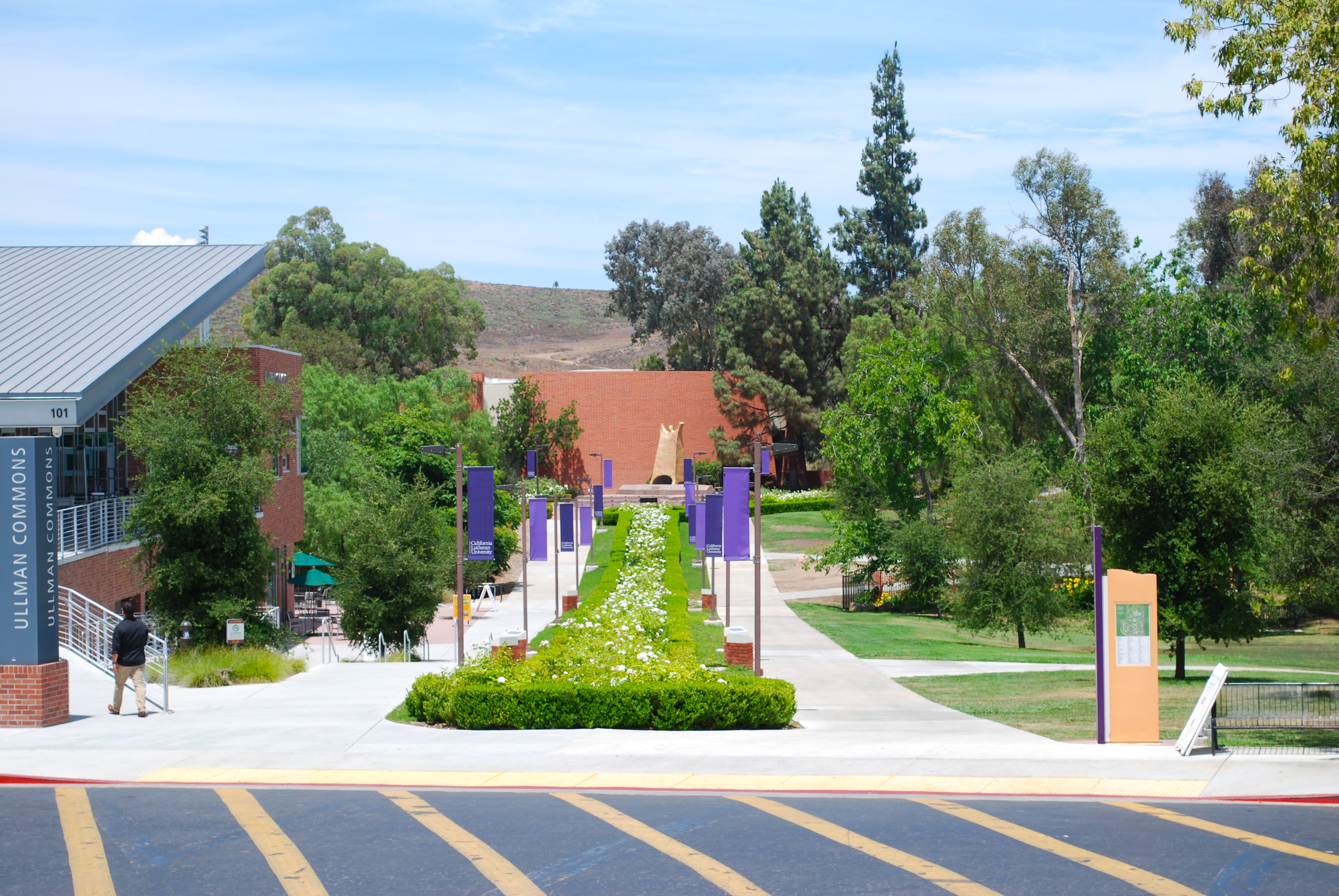
Regals Way by Kingsmen Park

As far back as the turn of the 20th century, when the first Norwegian Lutheran settlers came to the Conejo Valley, Lutherans had the dream of one day establishing a college of their own. U.S. Senator Leland Stanford had offered a 50-acre (20 ha) lot near Palo Alto, California, to Swedish Lutherans, but withdrew the offer when asked to fund the construction. Decades later in 1928, a group of Los Angeles developers gave a 100-acre (40 ha) site in Del Rey Hills in order to establish "Los Angeles Lutheran University". The land was donated by the Harry Culver Company, Dickinson & Gillespie, film director King Vidor, and Joseph Mesmer. Architects planned a Mediterranean-style campus with a 200-foot (61 m) campanile on the mesa's edge. The ground-breaking was scheduled for the summer of 1928, but according to a front-page article in the Los Angeles Times, the 1929 stock market crash postponed the scheduled construction indefinitely. This site is now the current location of Loyola Marymount University.

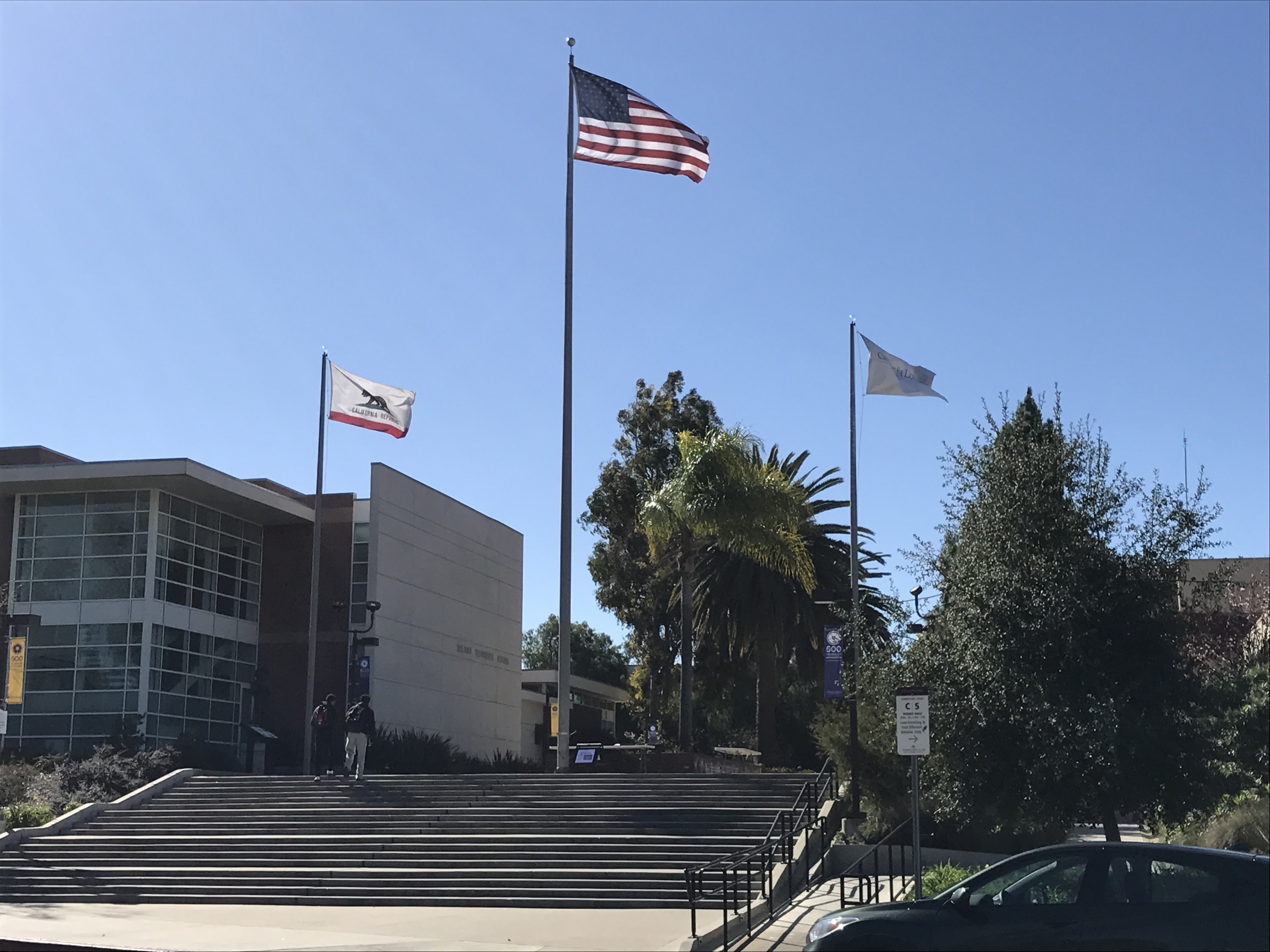
Flagpoles by Soiland Humanities Center

The first official steps in creating a college took place at the first annual convention of the new South Pacific District of the American Lutheran Church (ALC) in 1951. A resolution passed which urged congregations to contribute an amount of money to the project, equal to twenty percent of their offering to the national synodical budget. The convention also established the Higher Education Committee, whose purpose was to study the details of establishing a college in the district. The committee held its meetings in downtown Los Angeles restaurants, hotels, and churches. The committee made a resolution which was adopted at the Evangelical Lutheran Church (ELC) convention in Minneapolis, Minnesota on June 5, 1952, which requested the Board of Christian Education of the ELC to study educational possibilities in the California District. Participants in the study included leaders of the national church bodies of the ALC, the United Lutheran Church in America (ULCA), the United Evangelical Lutheran Church (UELC), and the Augustana Synod.

When World War II ended, the 1944 GI Bill of Rights made it financially possible for over a million veterans to return to college, doubling and even quadrupling the size of some Lutheran colleges in the United States. At the time, California was home to 16 Protestant and 12 Roman Catholic colleges, however, Lutherans lacked a four-year college in the state. A 1954 inter-Lutheran study of educational possibilities in California, conducted by the study, concluded that there was the desirability of establishing a Lutheran four-year college in the state due to factors such as the long distance to other Lutheran liberal arts colleges and a large growth of Lutheran churches. Among those responsible for preparing the study was Dr. Orville Dahl, executive secretary of the Board of Higher Education of the ELC; Dr. William L. Young of the ALC; Dr. Gould Wickey of the ULCA; and Dr. Carl Segerhammar of the Augustana Lutheran Church. The president of the California District of the ELC, Gaylerd Falde, later made it one of his ministry's top priorities to establish a Lutheran college in California. He convened a North Hollywood meeting on September 13, 1954, that took initial steps toward the formation of committees to plan for a Lutheran college. A steering committee was assigned to handle public relations, while four subcommittees were formed to deal with incorporation, finance and location.

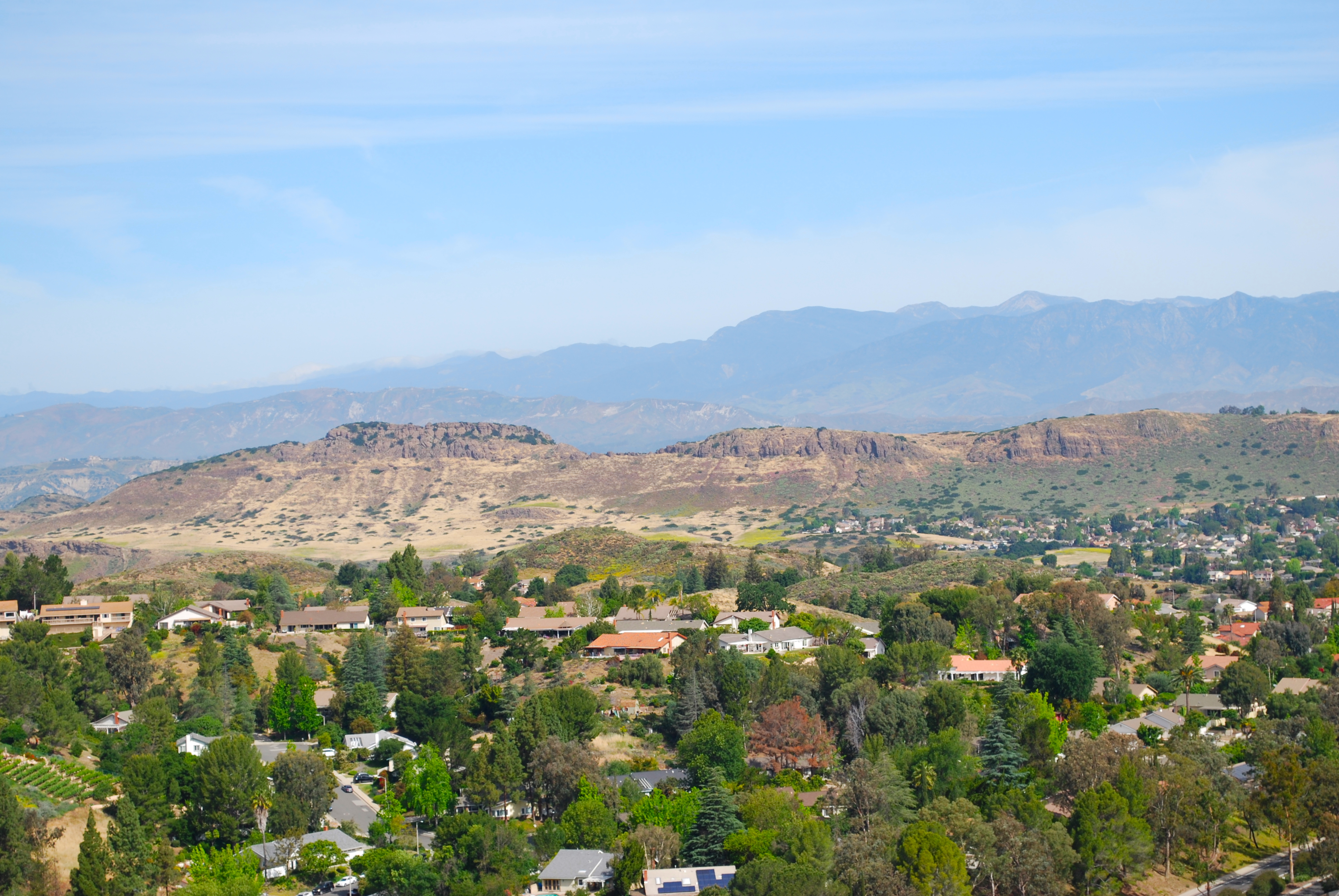
Mount Clef Ridge is named for California Lutheran Education Foundation (CLEF), which worked to establish CLU in the 1950s.

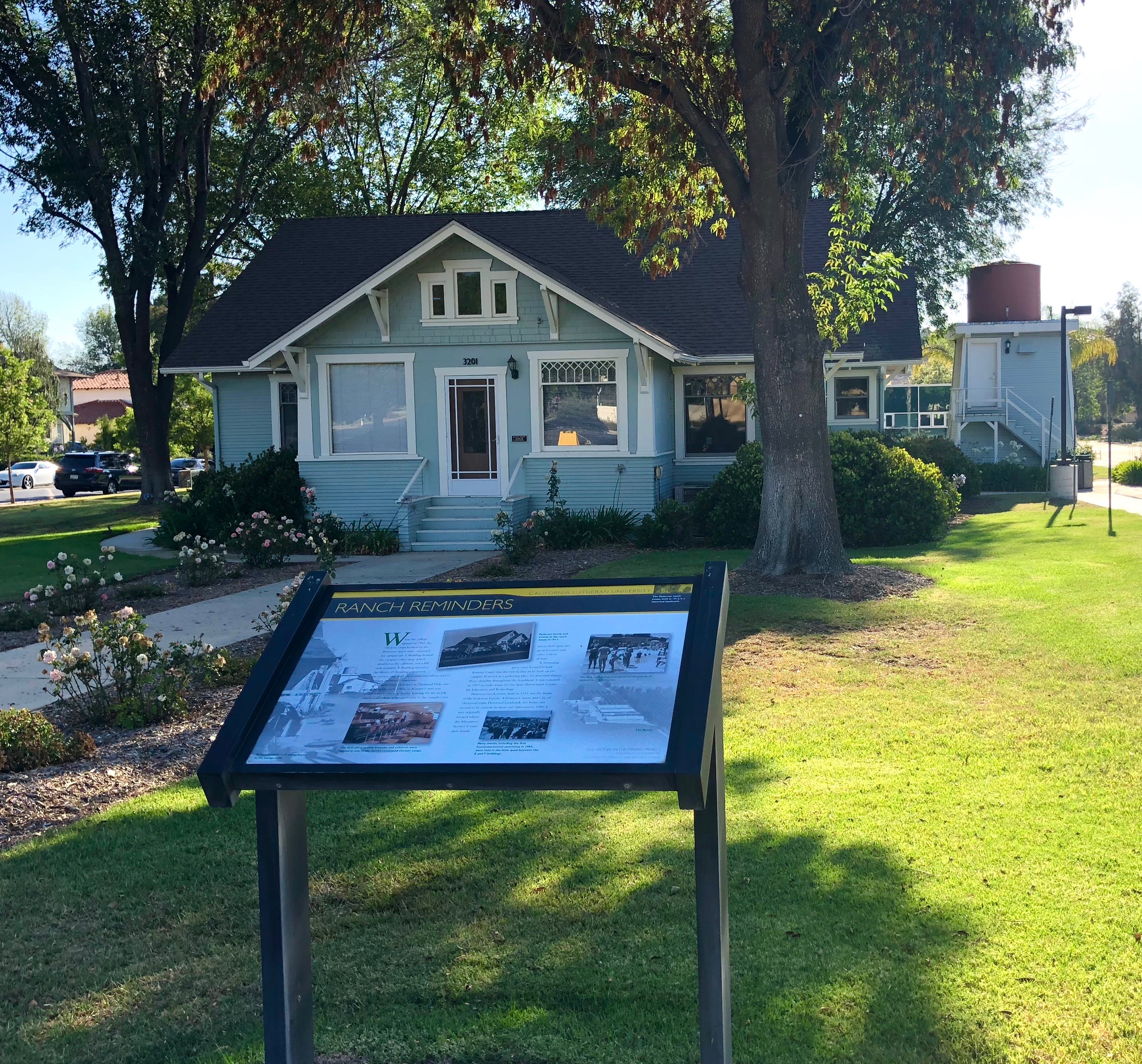
Pederson House was built by Norwegian Lars Pederson in 1913.

=== California Lutheran Educational Foundation ===
The Committee of Twenty-Five grew out of the meeting and first convened on October 29, 1954, with representatives of the same Lutheran church bodies sitting on the committee. They studied and developed plans while drafting the Articles of Incorporation, which received preliminary approval. The Articles of Incorporation were to be signed on April 20, 1957, but the signing was delayed due to disagreements over whether the college should be governed by a local or national board. Another meeting was held on May 25, 1957, in Chicago, Illinois, but no agreement was reached. A charitable foundation known as California Lutheran Educational Foundation (CLEF) was established on June 4, 1957, with the purpose of gathering funds for the college. Office facilities for the foundation were rented in the First National Bank Building on the corner of Hollywood Boulevard and Highland Avenue in Hollywood. Dr. Raymond Olson, the director of stewardship for the ELC and later president of the college, was helping to analyze potential fundraising and financing policies for Gaylerd Falde. The ELC had not established a college since 1903 and an important task was to enlist the participation of the five different national and local Lutheran judicatories.

Dahl and members of the CLEF visited over fifty sites in search of a location for the new college. Some of the sites considered included an old hotel site at the foot of the San Bernardino Mountains, an abandoned military hospital near Corona, a peninsula near Dana Point, and a new town just being built near Santa Rosa in Northern California. His last visit, which took place on Sept. 24, 1957, took him 45 miles (72 km) northwest of Los Angeles to the Conejo Valley, where Dahl was offered land by Norwegian farmer Lawrence Pederson. The price tag was however too high, but his brother, Richard Pederson, approached Dahl the next day and handed him the deed to his 130-acre (53 ha) ranch property. Richard and Lawrence Pederson were the sons of Norwegian immigrants Lars and Karn Pederson, who were among the first settlers in the valley and part of the Norwegian Colony. Having arrived in the Conejo Valley in 1890, the Pedersons lived in a Sears Roebuck catalog house on the property (Pederson House and Water Tower). The Pedersons and nearby Olsen families were notable for having constructed the nearby Norwegian Grade. The Pedersons donated the ranch to the Lutheran church for the purpose of building a college where students could obtain a Christian education.

On November 3, 1957, the college's first board of governors was installed at the First Lutheran Church in Glendale, California. Falde was elected chairman of its board of governors and Dahl was elected director. The board's first meeting was held on March 7, 1958, when Dahl announced that the college was to be opened in 1961. Falde then made the establishment of the new college the top priority for his ministry. After the Thousand Oaks-site was secured, arrangements were made in February 1958 to move CLEF's offices to the Pederson Ranch in order to begin the campus development. To help develop the master plan, CLEF employed the services of the Los Angeles architectural firm of Mann, Daniel, Johnson, and Mendenhall. The plan was designed with a Centrum which included motel-type dormitories, a book shop, post office, and administrative offices. Centrum would eventually be converted into a shopping center in order to provide an endowment for permanent buildings to be constructed on campus. Another top priority was to find a name for the new college. Names such as Los Angeles University and Ventura Lutheran University were suggested, and the Lutheran Herald reported on December 30, 1958, that the $15 million college was to be named Ventura University. CLEF officials claimed newspapers had been premature and a name was announced before it had been agreed upon. CLEF reached a final agreement on the name California Lutheran College (CLC) after some CLEF members felt it would be presumptuous to name a college in Ventura County "Los Angeles University", which some members opted for.

The development program was formulated when the board of governors met on campus for the first time on March 7, 1958. The opening of the college had been unofficially set for fall of 1961. CLEF developed a summary of immediate needs for a total amount of $2,135,000. This basic plan would allow for the enrollment of 400 students, 200 of whom were to be residing at the college. CLEF decided that in order to secure the funds, each church body were to share the investment proportionately. With the exception of the site, no gifts larger than $400,000 were responsible for the college. Large donations included a $25,000 gift received from Lutheran Brotherhood, a fraternal insurance society. With the first $300,000 secured, work began on the college library, science building, and student center. Construction on the two dormitories, Alpha and Omega (today known as Thompson and Pederson), was to begin if $500,000 were collected by February 1, 1961. To ensure that the college reached this goal, it sold Investment Trust Certificates as the new college was ineligible for government loans. Certificates were sold in $100 denominations enabling participation from small investors.

The CLEF Board of governors held its last meeting on February 27, 1959. The Articles of Incorporation were adopted and the same meeting reconvened the same day as the board of regents of California Lutheran College. The college regents had been elected by a convocation with representatives proportionately assigned to the five participating bodies. The first action of the regents was determining the college's start date to be September 1961. A secret ballot took place in order to select the first college president. The ballots were opened by the board's executive committee on June 5, 1959, with 21 members voting to elect Dahl. California Lutheran College was formally incorporated on August 4, 1959, and soon the site was bursting with activity such as bulldozers and ongoing construction. Carpenter John Beyer was given the task of remodeling the brooder houses into classrooms. At the time, Thousand Oaks was an unincorporated community with a population of around 3,000. Much of Thousand Oaks’ development was undertaken by the Janss Corporation, which later paid for engineering site analysis of the Pederson Ranch and later gave donations to various CLC projects. Dahl was convinced that without a strong church connection, the school would never become reality. He quickly established an outdoor place of worship and also constructed a swimming pool to entice congregations to come out to the future campus.

The joint operation and ownership of CLC opened the way for further cooperative institutional relationships, and Lutheran Church in America synods consequentially became participants in the governance of two ALC institutions: Texas Lutheran College and Pacific Lutheran University.

=== Foundation and early years ===
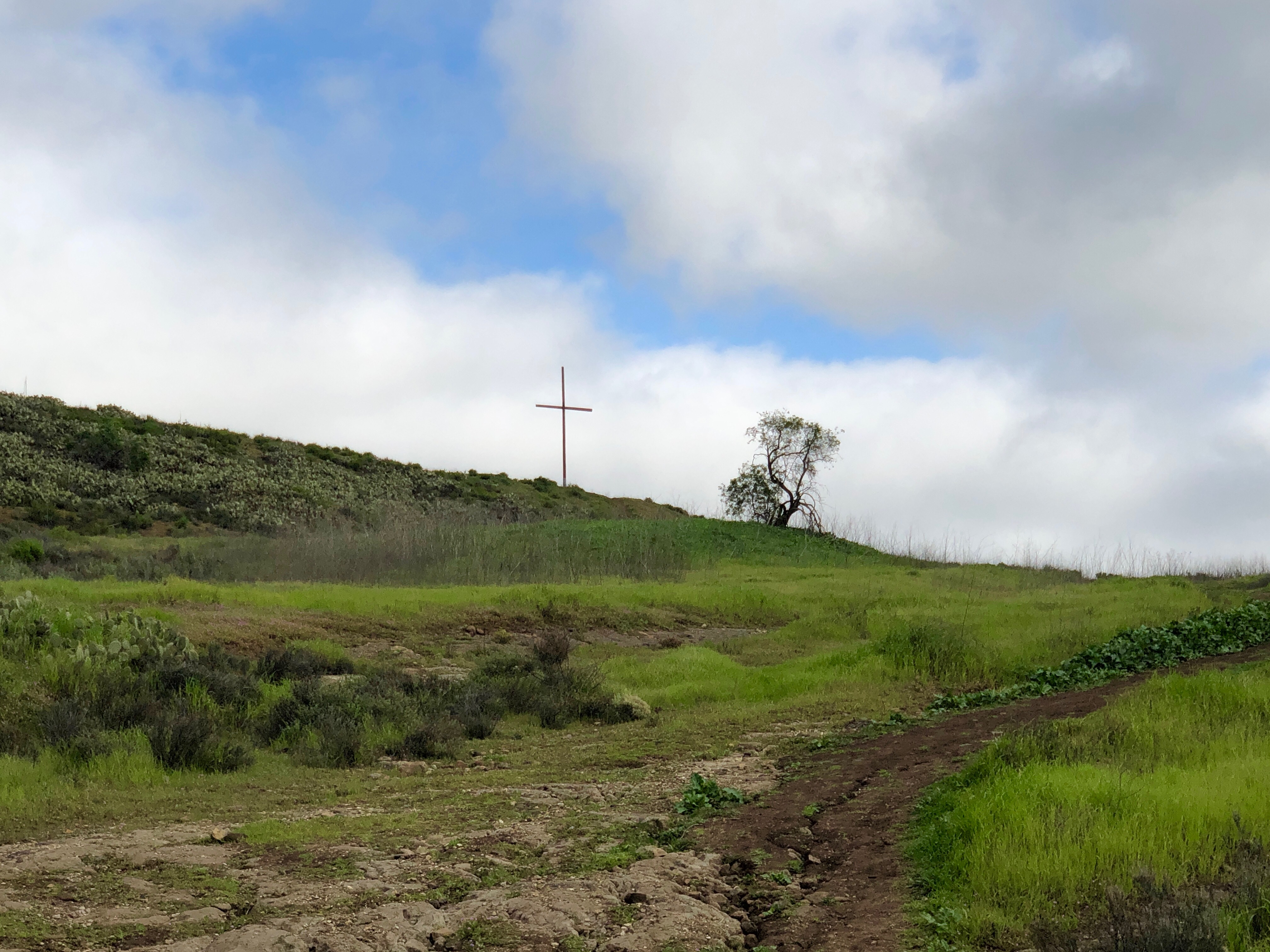
The cross on Mount Clef Ridge

California Lutheran College opened its doors in the fall of 1961. Church contributions of $400,000, along with individual gifts and loans, had made the completion of a new campus center possible, which consisted of eight buildings. In addition to those eight, the old Pederson House and chicken coops were remodeled into classrooms and offices. The new college was planted in a fertile setting, rimmed by rolling hills, and home to Kingsmen Creek. Orange and walnut groves from the old Pederson Ranch were still seen on campus. The college's formal dedication was held on Reformation Sunday at the end of October 1961. A highlight of this service was "A Mighty Fortress Is Our God" performed by the newly formed college orchestra and choir. About 4,000 Lutherans came to witness the service.

All the first faculty members were of Lutheran faith, often recruited from other Lutheran colleges. There was an understanding during its first two years that only Lutherans should be hired. Of the 302 students enrolled during its first year, almost all were Lutheran. 92 percent of the second year freshman class came from Lutheran congregations.

The college was accredited by the Western Association of Colleges and Secondary Schools in March 1962. Dahl served as president until 1962, bringing the university's first football coach, Robert Shoup, to the campus in his final year.

The Dallas Cowboys brought their summer training camp to the campus in 1963 and kept it there until 1989.

On February 20, 1967, about 200 students instituted a sit-down in front the gymnasium while the chapel was in service to protest things that they believed needed to be changed such as the attendance policy, and operating hours of the library, bookstore, and coffee shop — all of which were closed during chapel services. On April 19, 1968, three hundred Cal Lutheran students commemorated the life of assassinated civil rights activist Martin Luther King Jr. by marching down Moorpark Boulevard in his memory.

Another march was held as part of the National Vietnam War Moratorium Rally. Both marches went from California Lutheran College to downtown Thousand Oaks. President Raymond Olson was among those marching with the students and speaking out against the Vietnam War.

In the mid-1960s, the WASC Accrediting Committee had expressed concern over indebtedness in excess of $1,731,000 and a deficit in current funds of over $350,000. President Olson inherited the debt, and further deficit budgets during his tenure added to the college's indebtedness. Donations and grants were insufficient to balance the budget, and the board of regents complained they had difficulty getting exact amounts on income versus expenditures. In spite of its economic turmoil, the college grew in number of students, academic reputation, and in number of faculty members. In the fall of 1963, the college had 550 students and in 1964 reached a total of 736 students, originating from 24 U.S. states, Sweden, and China. Although Lutherans still made up a majority of 78%, seventeen other denominations were also represented at the college. The percentage of Lutheran faculty and administration workers was 69 percent. From 1963 to 1966, full-time faculty grew from 38 to 69 persons, where Methodists and Presbyterians were the most represented non-Lutheran faculty. A 1965 survey conducted by the Lutheran Students Association of America reported a total count of three African American students at California Lutheran.

=== Early finances ===
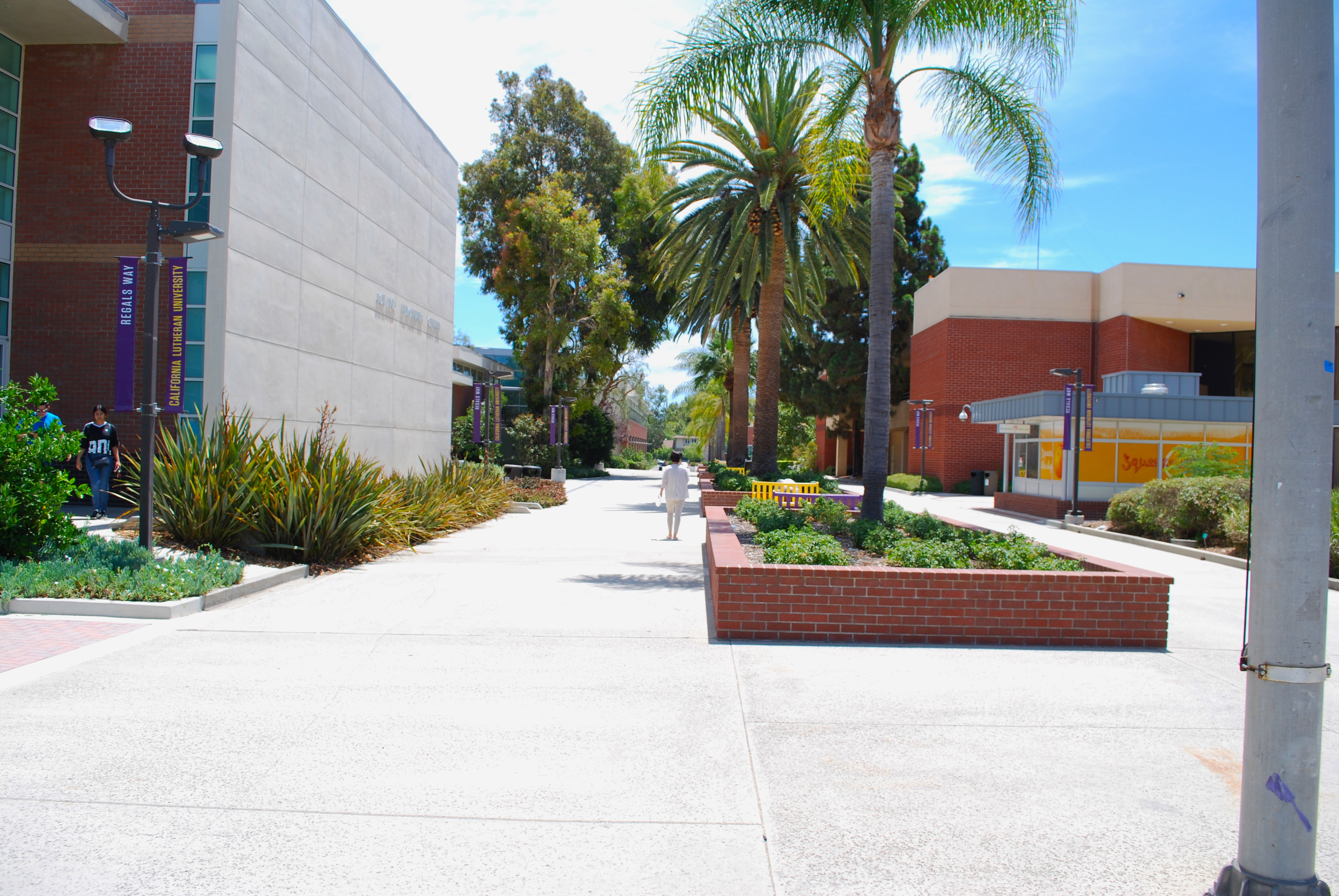
Walkway by flagpoles

The school's total debt reached a staggering $3,600,000 in 1970, and the university was facing bankruptcy. Marine Knutson, a Lutheran layman who had experience within crisis management, was hired by the national church as a financial troubleshooter for the college. By applying austere measures that included cutting the facility by seven work positions, Knutson managed to end the year 1970 with an $80,000 budget surplus and was also successful in reducing the debt by $800,000 by the end of the year. National church bodies made a guaranteed commitment for a loan of $1,000,000. Olson resigned as president in May 1971, after eight years as president during a tenure of a financial crisis and social upheaval. However, Olson had tripled the college's size, and the school was now home of 1,000 students.

When the search for a new president failed to produce a candidate from outside campus, the board of regents was advised by Knutson to appoint Mark A. Mathews, the chair of the business administration and economics department. As Mathews was a Presbyterian, the institution's by-laws had to be changed in order to permit him to hold the office. Mathews became acting college president in 1972. Under his fiscal management, the college reversed the deficit trend and a longer period of financial stability and growth followed his tenure. Also in 1972, he developed the Business Management Forum which was designed to build bridges to the business community. The Forum, which is now named the Mathews Leadership Forum in honor of President Mathews, brought a large number of business leaders to the campus. After a decade of financial deficits, one of the first steps of Mathews' administration was to install a budget planning process which involved the input from all segments of faculty departments. He chose A. Dean Buchanan to guide the school's financial program. Buchanan, who had guided the financial program at Pacific Lutheran University for eleven years, was a graduate of University of California, Berkeley and noted in the field of college fiscal management. President Mathews later formed the Committee for New Dimensions which reached into the business community in nearby Los Angeles. Efforts were also made at recruiting corporate leadership to the board of regents.

In 1971, the college football team won the NAIA Football National Championship. A celebration was held at the Hollywood Palladium in conjunction with the Dallas Cowboys who won their first Super Bowl in January 1972.

=== New expansion ===
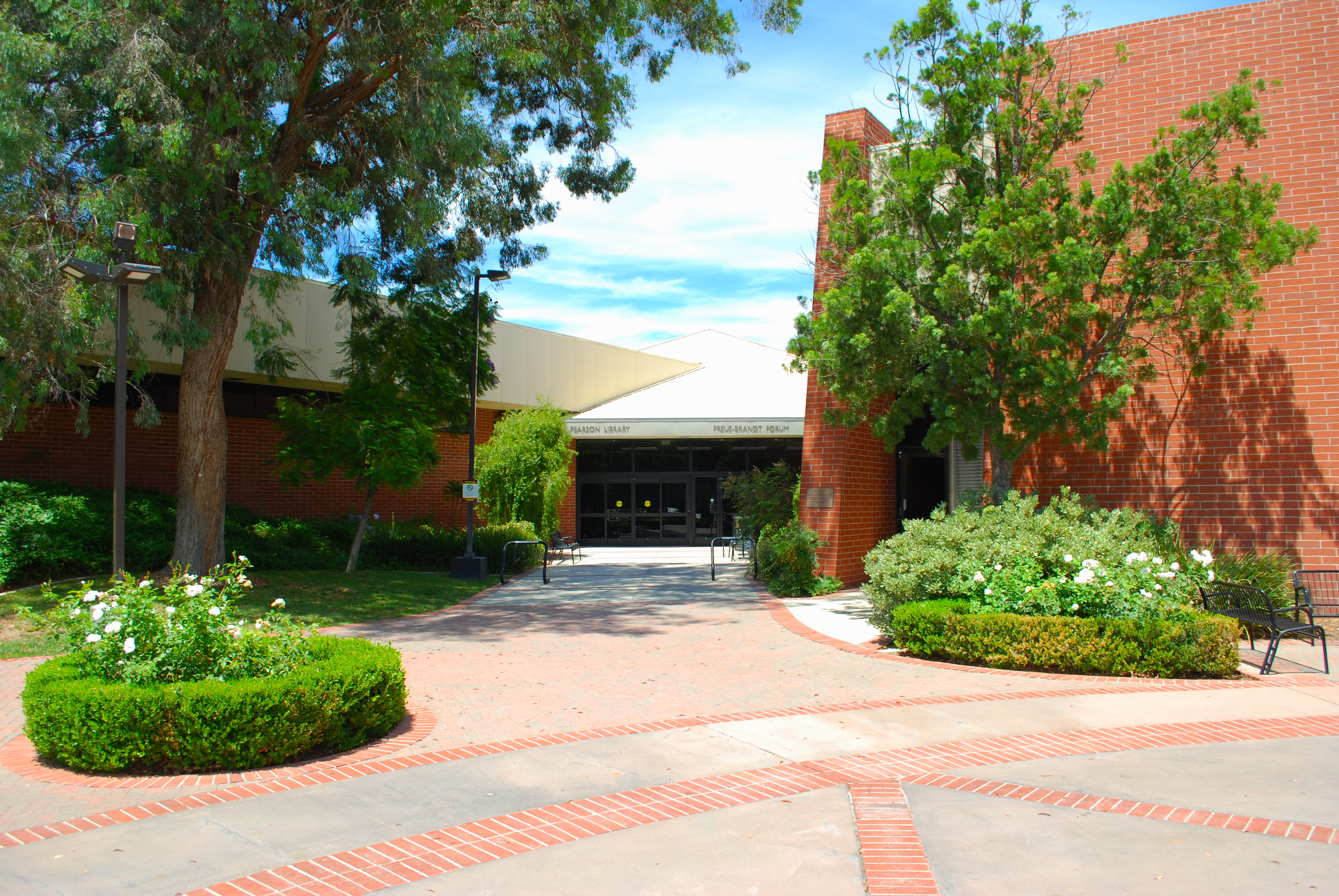
Pearson Library has over 132,000 titles.

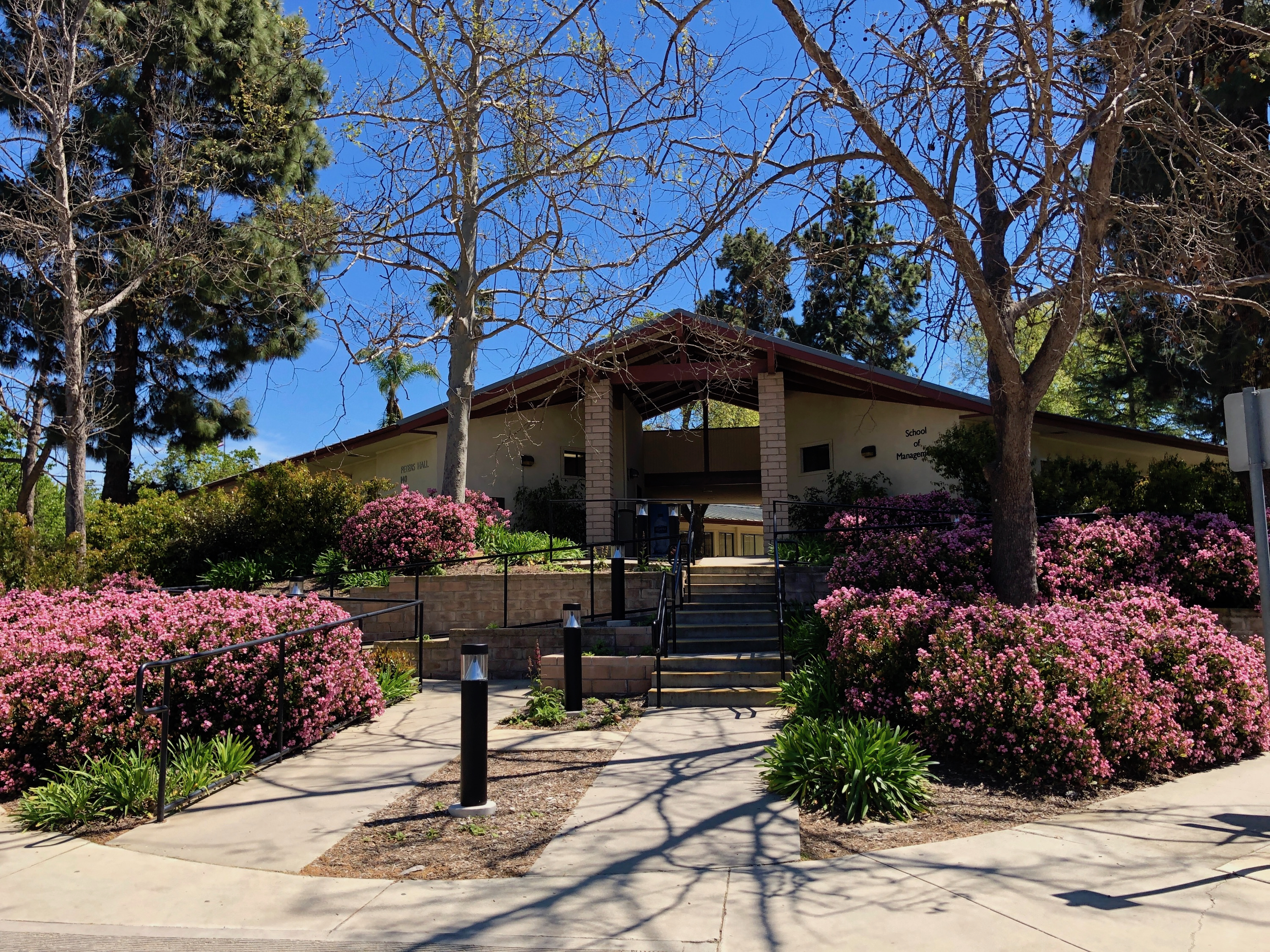
Peters Hall by Buth Park

Increased diversity in religious affiliation took place in the 1970s. In the first year of that decade, Lutherans represented 60% of the faculty, but by the 1978–1979 school year made up only 45% of the faculty. That year, "other Christians" for the first time in school history outnumbered Lutherans. Mathews resigned as president in 1980, and in 1981 Reverend Jerry H. Miller, director of National Lutheran Campus Ministry, became the fourth college president. The fiscal year 1983–1984 recorded grants and donations at $3,250,000, including an individual gift of $1 million, the single largest donation to that date. With the new funds in hand, the school was able to construct three major buildings: The Pearson Library was erected in 1985, the Ahmanson Science Center in 1988, and the Samuelson Chapel in 1990. Construction of the Ahmanson Science Center meant that all sciences for the first time had adequate equipment and space to initiate significant research programs. The new library housed 100,000 books as of 1985.

During Miller's first academic year in 1981–82, Peters Hall was dedicated on October 23, 1981. In 1983, Hansen Business Center was dedicated. Student publications The Echo and The Morning Glory received top national awards. The Echo received the All American Award in 1982 and The Morning Glory won the Pacemaker Award in 1983.

The Landry Medal, named for Dallas Cowboys' coach Tom Landry, was created with the help of Bob Shoup in 1980. The medal was awarded each year from 1980 to 2002. The NFL team was involved in the development of the university's athletic facilities and coaching of the Cal Lutheran football team. Coaches Landry and Shoup put on two annual summer events: a coaching clinic and a charity function known as Christian Businessmen's Club Day.

=== Increased diversity ===
Lutherans at CLU
Year	Students	Faculty
1961	100%	100%
1964	78%	69%
1970	-	60%
1978	-	45%
1994–95	24.5%	35%
2005	10%	-
2013	10%	-

In the early 1980s, the college was committed to the establishment of an environment supportive of cultural and ethnic pluralism. In 1981, the college established four-year working relations with a study group from Japan. With a peak enrollment of 45 Japanese students, the college was further encouraged by the Western Association of Schools and Colleges in 1983 to be more multiculturally diverse. The college's report to WASC in 1988 consisted of a revised mission statement which affirmed that the college is welcome to "students of all ages as well as all cultural, religious and ethnic backgrounds". The school began a determined effort in 1986 based on recruiting international students from Scandinavia, and in one year it was seventy international students from Norway attending the college. Furthermore, a grant from the Irvine Foundation helped the college recruit and offer financial aid to minorities. The effort became successful and the college soon attracted a significant Hispanic-American population from Ventura County. An Office of Multicultural Services was established to facilitate various ethnic organizations and their events. Another accommodation the university made to promote diversity includes the Prayer Room located in the Samuelson Chapel. This is a place that is welcome to all faiths where anyone can freely go and practice.

=== University status ===
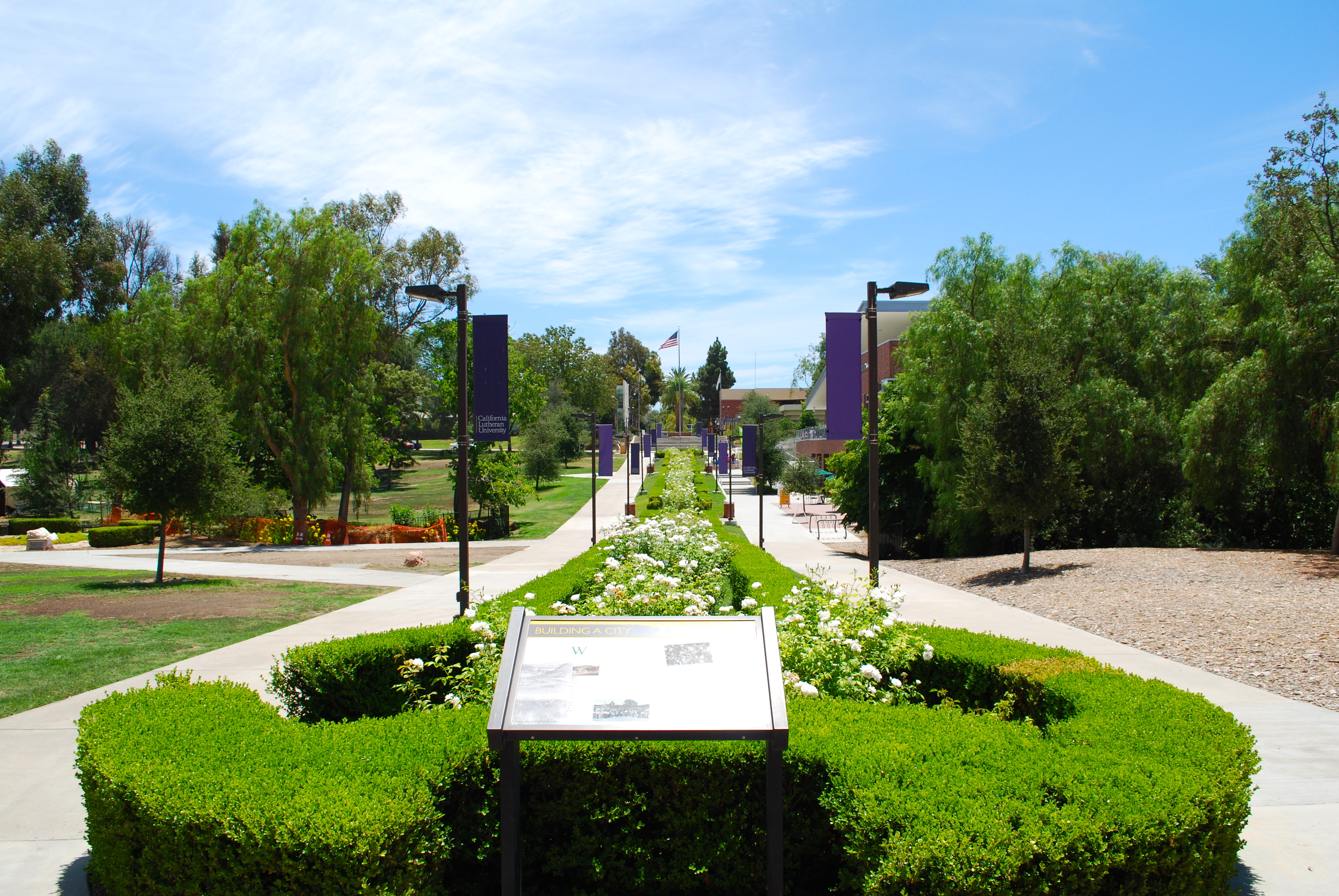
Regals Way as seen from Falde Plaza

In the fall of 1985, the board of regents agreed with the administration that California Lutheran College was ready to receive university status. Not all agreed; those opposing the change felt it could mean sacrificing CLC's focus on liberal arts. Some also argued that the college did not have an adequate university library, or that the college in other ways was not ready. Those favoring the change noted that CLC already had graduate programs at the master's level in five distinct areas, and also noted that despite being the only four-year college in Ventura County, CLC kept being compared to the state's two-year community colleges. Some were persuaded that turning into a university would force the administrators to take more seriously the scholarly quests for academic excellence. On January 1, 1986, the college became California Lutheran University (CLU).

=== Modern history ===
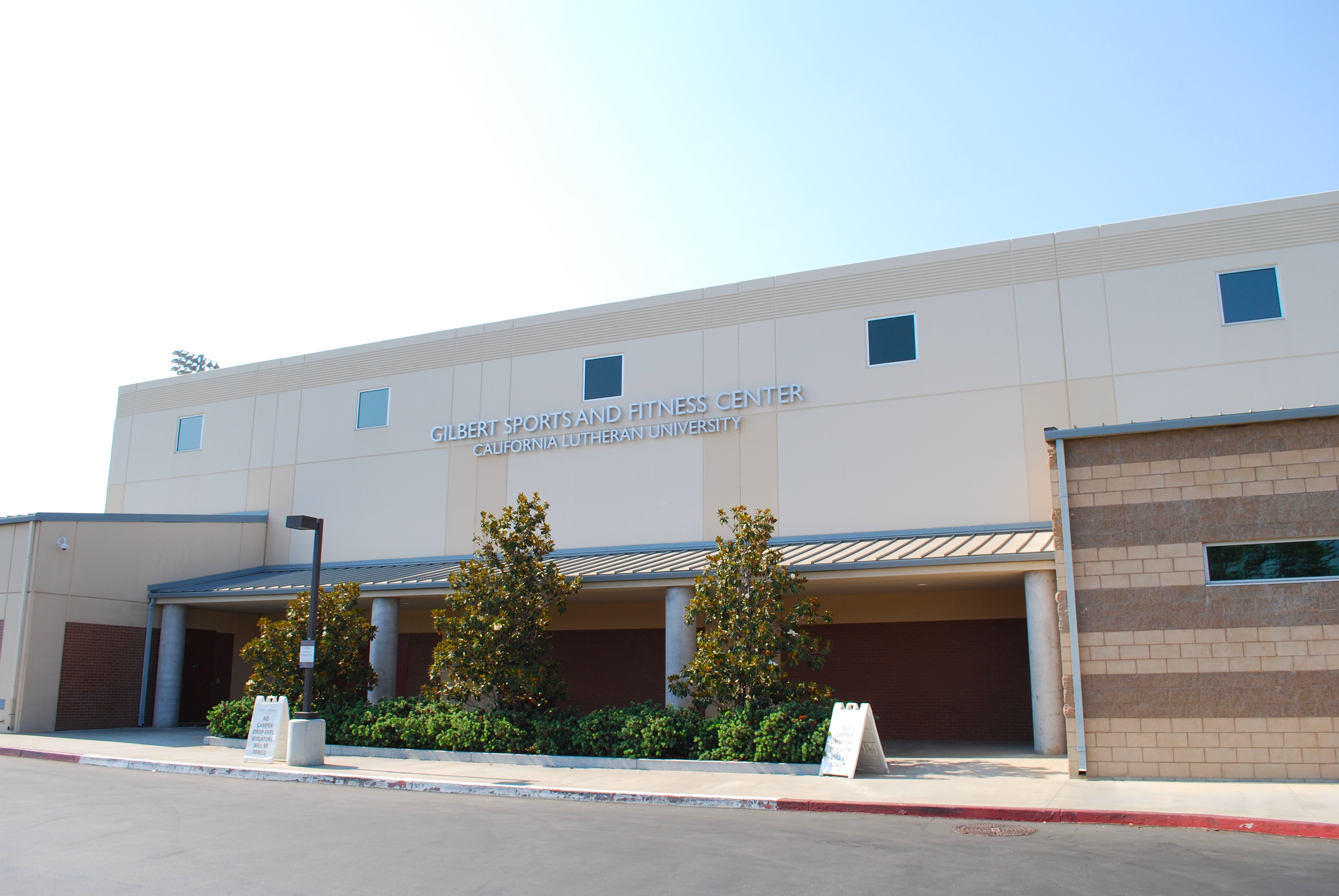
The 96,000-square-foot (8,900 m^{2}) Gilbert Sports and Fitness Center was completed in 2006.

On November 3, 1990, President George H. W. Bush planted a tree on the campus. Around 1,400 students and visitors showed up to hear him speak.

In 1994, KCLU-FM, a non-commercial public radio station, was established and housed on the Cal Lutheran campus. Academy award-winning screenwriter Norman Corwin held a presentation during the "Sign-On" party, which took place on October 20, 1994. The CLUnet data network was also installed in 1994.

On October 22, 2004, work began on the north campus athletics complex. MLB manager Sparky Anderson and Tommy Lasorda were among those participating in the opening ceremony for the $80 million facilities.

The first doctoral degrees were granted in 2006.

In 2009, tryouts by the Olympic USA Team Handball was held at CLU. Also in 2009, the Thousand Oaks Community Pool was dedicated on February 21, and the nearby Poulson Tennis Center was dedicated the following day. Groundbreaking was held on June 4 for the Swenson Center for Academic Excellence, and in the fall, the 220-bed Trinity residence hall was completed.

In 2007, the Samuelson Aquatic Center was completed. It served as the official training site of the 2008 and 2012 US Olympic Men's Water Polo teams.

In 2011, William Rolland Stadium, which was named for its benefactor, was completed and opened. The stadium replaced the 1963 Mt. Clef Stadium and has a seating capacity of 3,000. The first game was played at the $8.9 million stadium on October 1, 2011.

Beginning in 2016, the school is hosting the temporary headquarters and regular season training facilities of the Los Angeles Rams of the NFL. The Rams paid for two practice fields, paved parking, and modular buildings constructed on the northwestern corner of the campus.

In 2016, CLU applied for and received Hispanic-serving institution (HSI) status from the U.S. Department of Education.

In 2017, Cal Lutheran's Kingsmen baseball team won the Division III College World Series.

On May 4, 2018, former secretary of state Condoleezza Rice held a speech at the Gilbert Sports and Fitness Center.

In 2018, Steve Dorfman, former vice-chairman of Hughes Electronics, made the largest single gift in university history. Dorfman donated $6 million toward the construction of a building for the School of Management. The 27,000 sq. ft. Steven D. Dorfman Center, an $18 million project, will be located at the former location of Nygreen Hall on Memorial Parkway.

On January 25, 2019, Los Angeles Dodgers attended a ceremony and luncheon at the Lundring Event Center in order to honor those affected by the 2018 Thousand Oaks shooting. The Cal Lutheran Choir performed the National Anthem at the L.A. Memorial Coliseum during the Los Angeles Rams' game against the Kansas City Chiefs on November 19, 2018.

=== University presidents ===
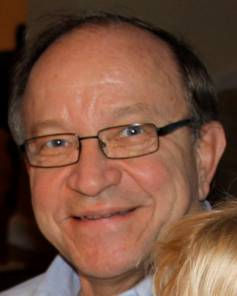
Luther Luedtke was the longest-serving President in the history of CLU.

- Orville Dahl, 1959–1962
- Raymond Olson, 1963–1971
- Mark A. Mathews, 1972–1980
- Jerry H. Miller, 1981–1992
- Luther Luedtke, 1992–2006
- John R. Sladek, 2006–2007
- Chris Kimball, 2008–2020
- Lori E. Varlotta, 2020–2024
- John A. Nunes (interim), 2024–

== Rankings ==
In 2012, Cal Lutheran was ranked number 14 among regional universities in the Western United States by U.S. News & World Report. As of 2022, CLU ranked No. 6. The same rating, U.S. News & World Report published by America's Best Colleges Guide, has rated CLU among the top 25 universities in Western United States for over ten consecutive years. In 2013 it ranked CLU as the 4th best university for veterans in the West, and 3rd as of 2014. In 1988, its 29th year, the university first appeared on the U.S. News & World Report's list of "best small comprehensive colleges." In the 1988 rankings, U.S. News & World Report ranked CLU as one of the best comprehensive colleges in the United States. It ranked CLU 18th out of 167 American institutions with between 1,500 and 2,500 students.

Forbes ranked CLU number 276 out of 650 "Top Colleges" in the U.S. in 2015. In 2017 Forbes ranked CLU as the 55th best university in the West.

The Economist ranked CLU number 19 in the U.S. in its first college rankings released in 2015. The ranking measured the economic value of universities by estimating "the gap between how much money its students subsequently earn, and how much they might have made had they studied elsewhere."

The company Niche ranked CLU 47th among the "Best Christian Colleges in America" in 2017, and 78th in "Best College Dorms in America". It also ranked the campus as the 101st best college campus in the U.S. The university also appeared in the 2015 "America's Top Colleges" by Forbes and Money.com's "Best Colleges For Your Money 2017". It has also appeared on PayScale's College Salary Report and Washington Monthly's Master Universities.

The university's MBA program was ranked 66th in North America by the 2010 QS World University Rankings. The Master of Science (M.S.) in Quantitative Economics was ranked fourth in the United States by the Financial Engineer Times in its 2018 Financial Economics Programs Rankings of graduate programs.

The student-faculty ratio is 15:1, and 98.4% of its classes have 49 students or fewer. 86 percent of its full-time faculty (118 persons) hold PhDs. As of 2016, there are 193 full-time and 244 part-time professors.

== Accreditations and affiliations ==
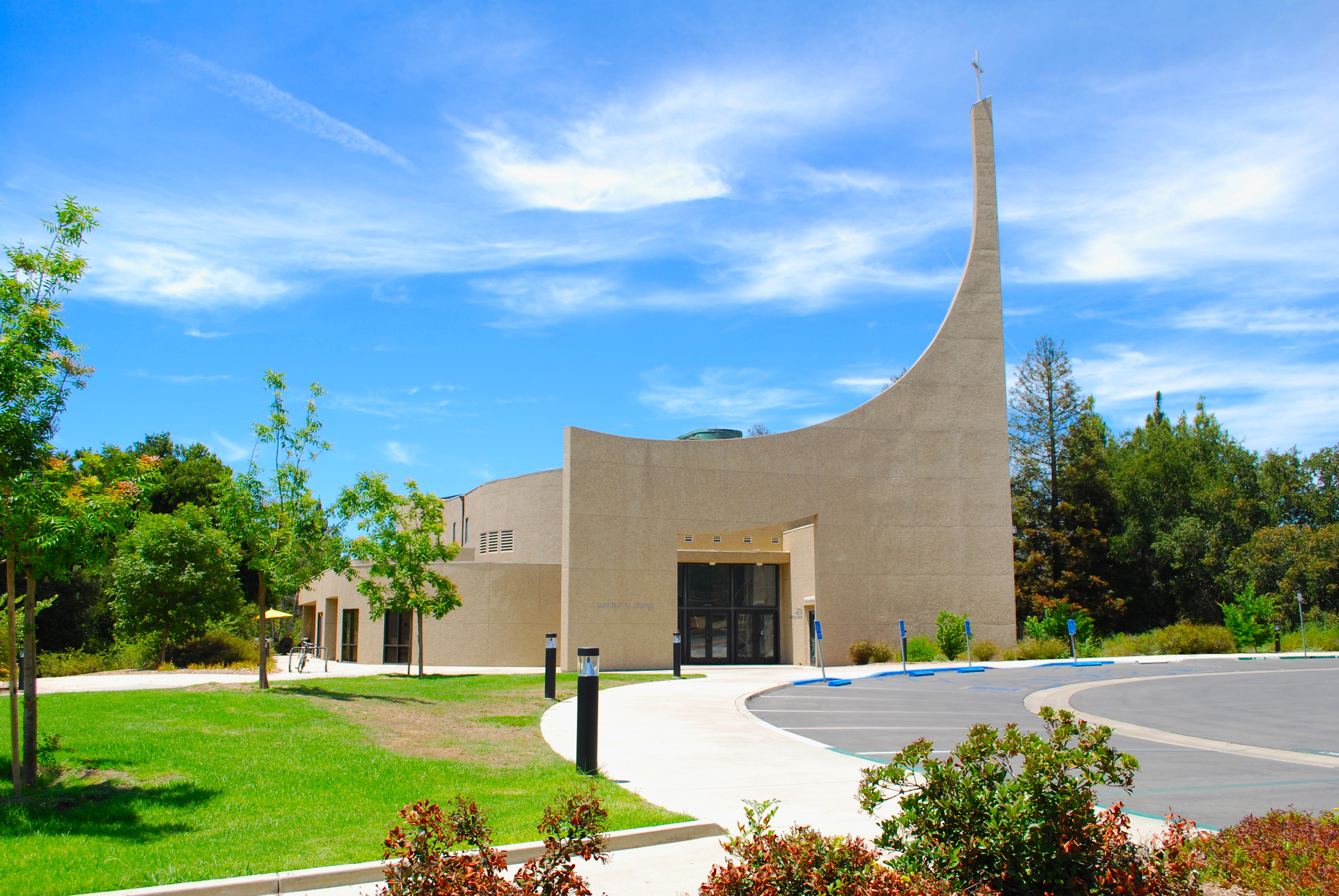
Samuelson Chapel with its 75-foot (23 m) spire was completed in 1991.

CLU is accredited by the Accrediting Commission for Senior Colleges and Universities, a commission of the Western Association of Schools and Colleges (WASC). It is also accredited by the California Commission on Teacher Credentialing (CCTC) and the National Council for Accreditation of Teacher Education (NCATE). The Financial Planning Program has been registered with the Certified Financial Planner Board of Standards. The Doctorate Program in Clinical Psychology, within the Graduate School of Psychology, is accredited by the American Psychological Association (APA). The Pacific Lutheran Theological Seminary (PLTS) is accredited by the Commission on Accrediting of the Association of Theological Schools (ATS).

It is a member of the National Association of Independent Colleges and Universities, Association of Independent California Colleges and Universities, and Council of Independent Colleges. CLU's intercollegiate athletic programs compete in the Southern California Intercollegiate Athletic Conference and in NCAA Division III. CLU is one of 28 colleges and universities affiliated with the Evangelical Lutheran Church in America (ELCA). It was the first Lutheran college to be established in California. It is the only ELCA-affiliated university in California and is one of two ELCA universities in Western United States, with Pacific Lutheran University being the other one. The M.P.P.A. program is accredited by the Accreditation Council for Business Schools and Programs (ACBSP).

== Campus ==
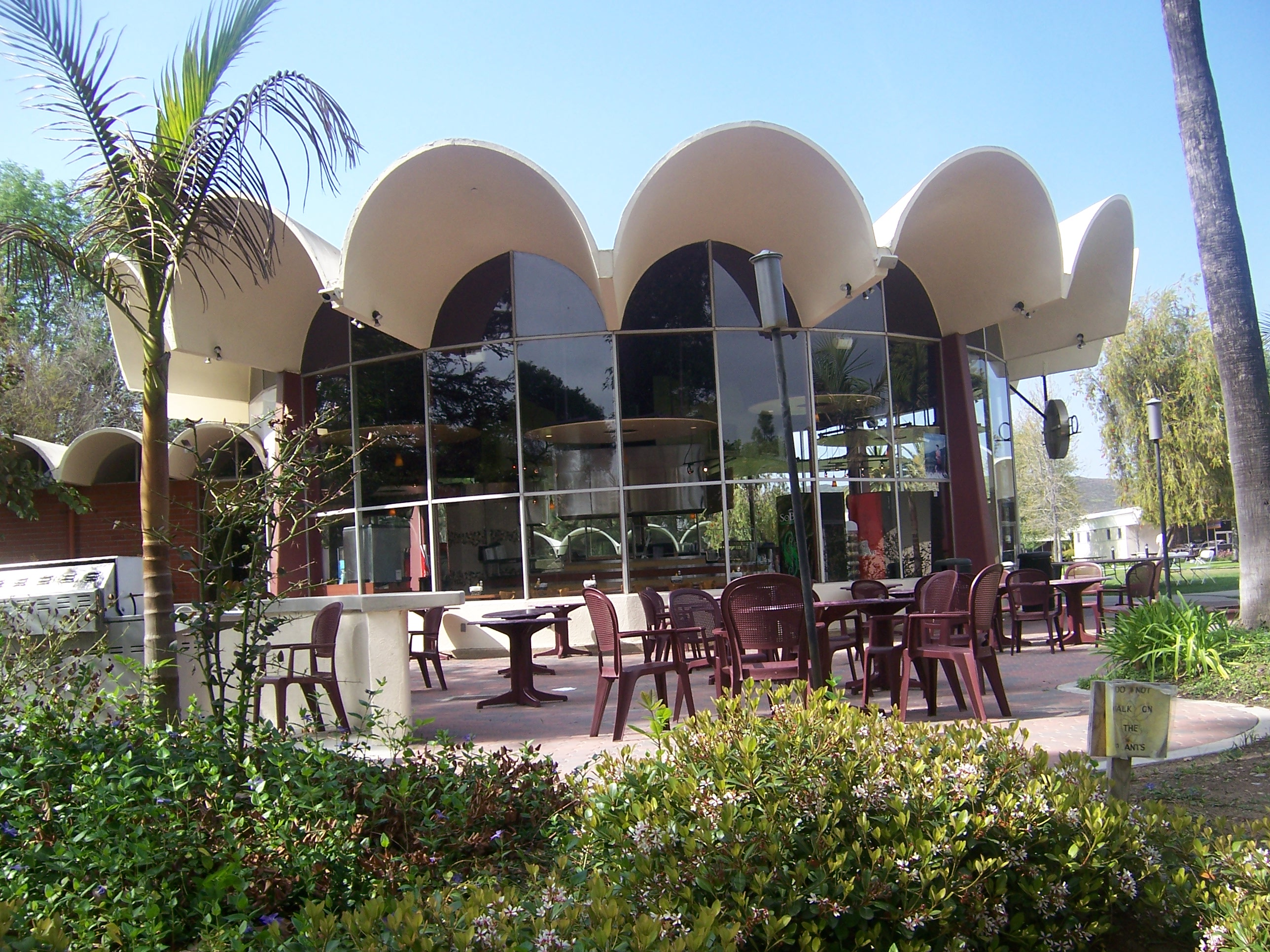
Centrum Cafe in Kingsmen Park

The 290-acre (1.2 km^{2}) main campus is located in Thousand Oaks, a city in southern Ventura County, California, comprising 41 buildings, four fields, two stadiums, two swimming pools, a tennis court, botanic gardens, as well as undeveloped chaparral hillsides. It lies 45 miles northwest of Los Angeles.

The university has a 96,000-square-foot (8,900 m^{2}) athletics complex, the Gilbert Sports and Fitness Center. Adjacent to the complex is the 50-meter Samuelson Aquatic Center and a 4,800-square-foot (450 m^{2}) community pool.

=== Campus layout ===
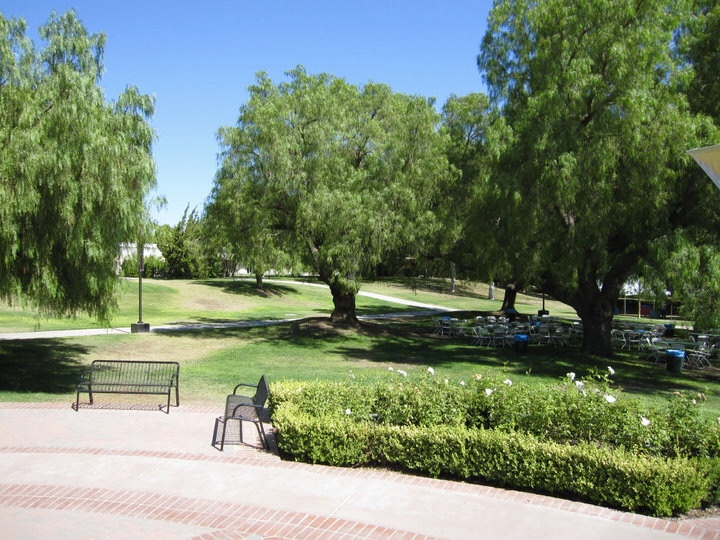
Kingsmen Park

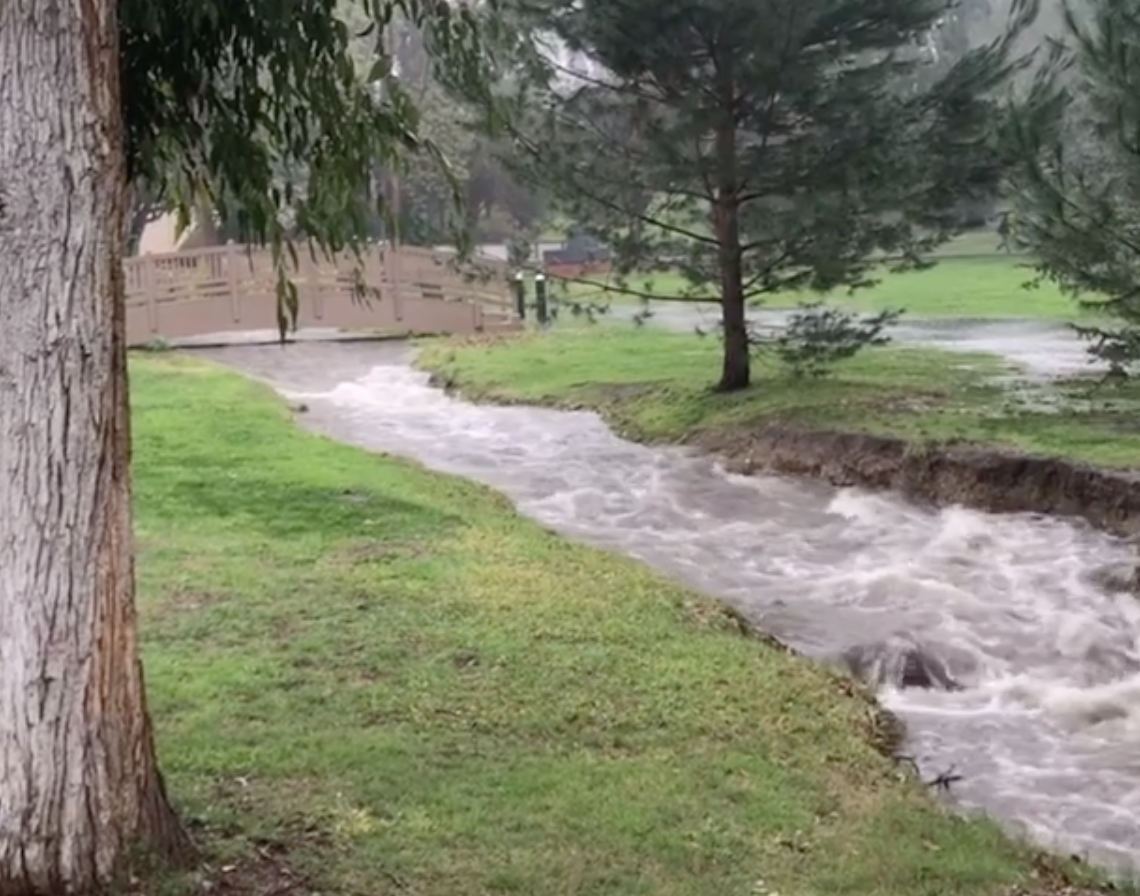
Kingsmen Creek in Kingsmen Park, the center of the university campus

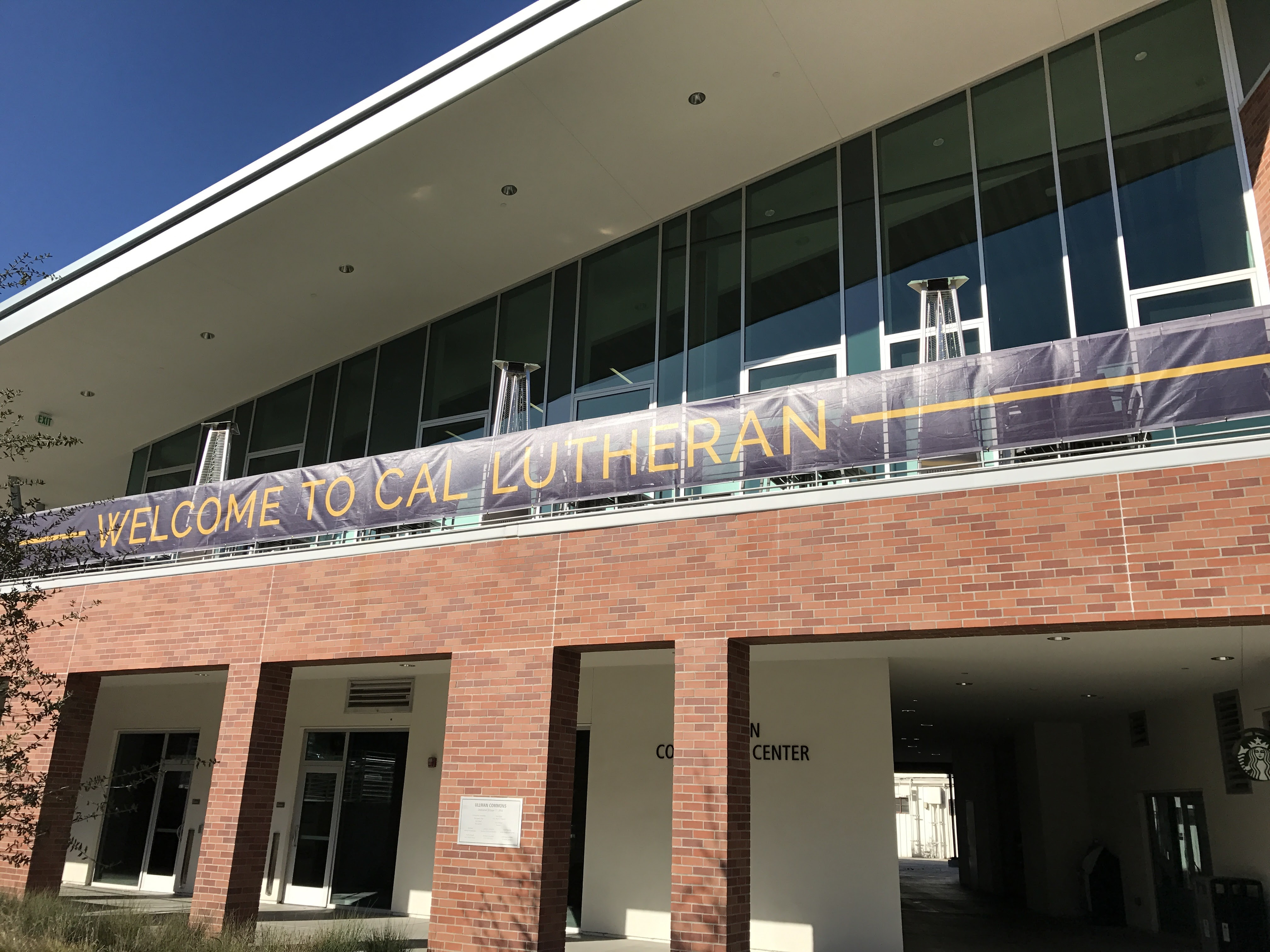
The Cafeteria

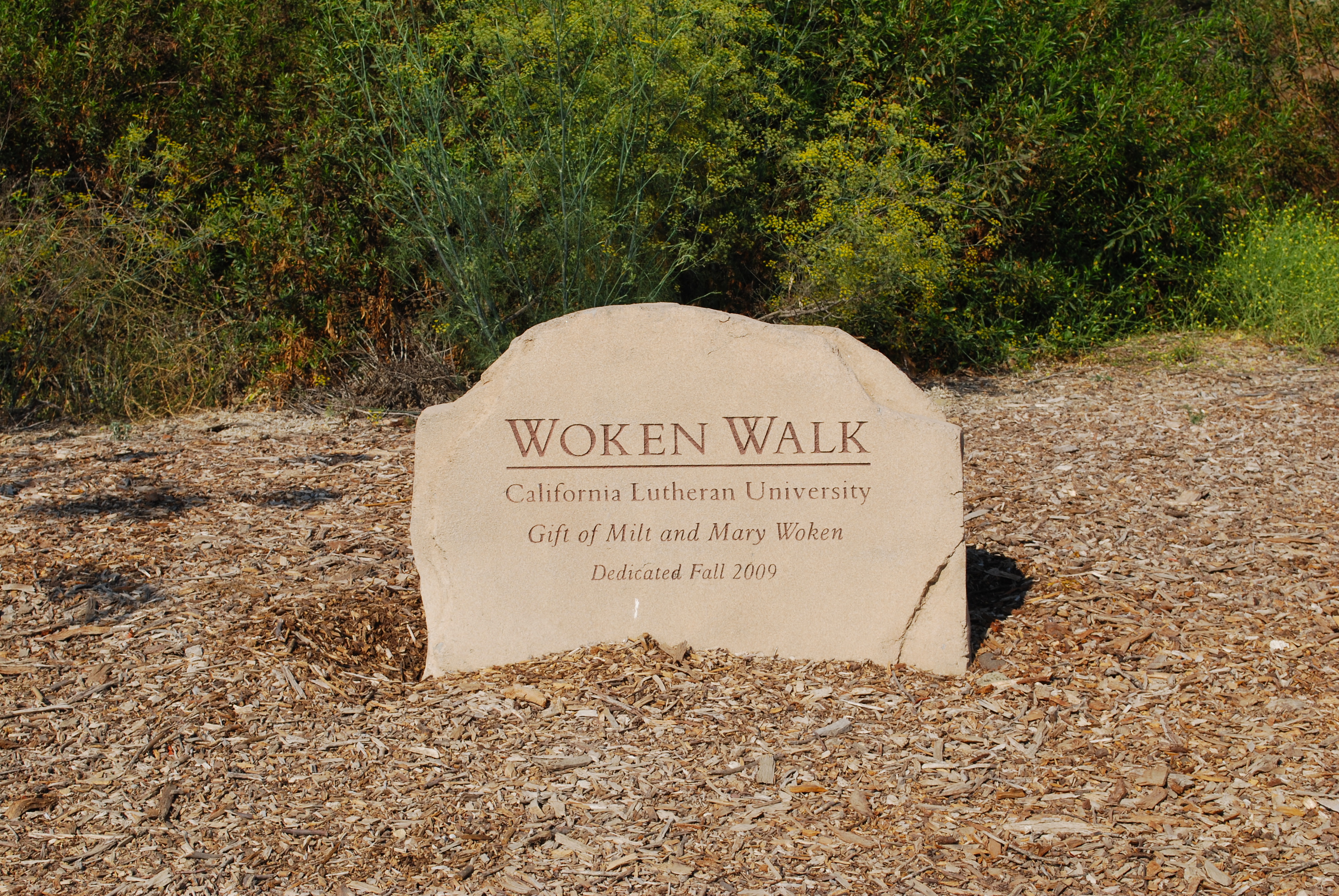
Sign by Woken Walk on the university campus

The campus of CLU is primarily organized by the four cardinal directions, with the north side, located across Olsen Road and backed up against Mount Clef Ridge, serving as the primary center for athletics. Some North Campus facilities include Gilbert Sports and Fitness Center, Samuelson Aquatic Center, Ullman Baseball Stadium and George Sparky Anderson Baseball Field, Hutton Softball Field, William Rolland Stadium (opened Fall 2011), Facilities Building and Yard, and a community pool for the City of Thousand Oaks.

The east side is the primary location for freshman residence halls and some administrative offices. Some east side facilities include Mt. Clef Residence Hall, Thompson Residence Hall, Pederson Residence Hall, Student Union, Alumni Hall, Centrum Café, Hanson Business Center, and Pederson Administration Building.

The south side, also known as the Academic Core, is the primary location for the academic buildings on campus. Southside facilities include Soiland Humanities Building, Ahmanson Science Center, Spies-Bornemann Center for Education and Technology, Nygreen Hall, Peters Hall (School of Business), and Swenson Center for the Social and Behavioral Sciences (opened Fall 2010). A Jamba Juice location and Starbucks store are also situated on the south side of the CLU campus.

The west side contains upperclassman housing. Westside facilities include Grace Hall Apartments, Mogen Hall Apartments (with the Mogen Market facility), Old West Complex (Afton, Janss, Rasmussen, and Conejo residence halls), New West Complex (North, South, West and Potenberg residence halls), and Trinity Hall (completed in 2009).

The center of the campus primarily features the Pearson Library as well as the Ullman Commons. Pearson Library holds 132,744 titles and 1,497 serial subscriptions. In addition to its 136,000 titles, the library housed 72,316 e-books, 2,378 audiovisuals and 550 current serials as of 2010. Dedicated in 1985, Pearson Library is a selective depository for government documents and also provides typewriters, video-recorders, microcomputers, and audiovisual equipment. Through the Online Computer Library Center, it has access to resources at over 3,000 additional libraries. The library is adjacent to the 250-seat Preus-Brandt Forum Theatre. It is located at 135 Chapel Lane. Pearson Library is staffed by nine employees: a library director, a collection development librarian, an information literacy librarian, an acquisitions librarian, an interlibrary loan librarian, a public services coordinator, and two circulation coordinators.

The former chicken coops of the Pederson Ranch were converted into classrooms by Jefferson A. Elmendorf, the same architect who worked with Orville Dahl in planning the campus and designed The Centrum and other campus buildings.

CLU's first LEED Certified building, the Swenson Center for the Social and Behavioral Sciences, opened in fall 2010.

=== Landmarks ===
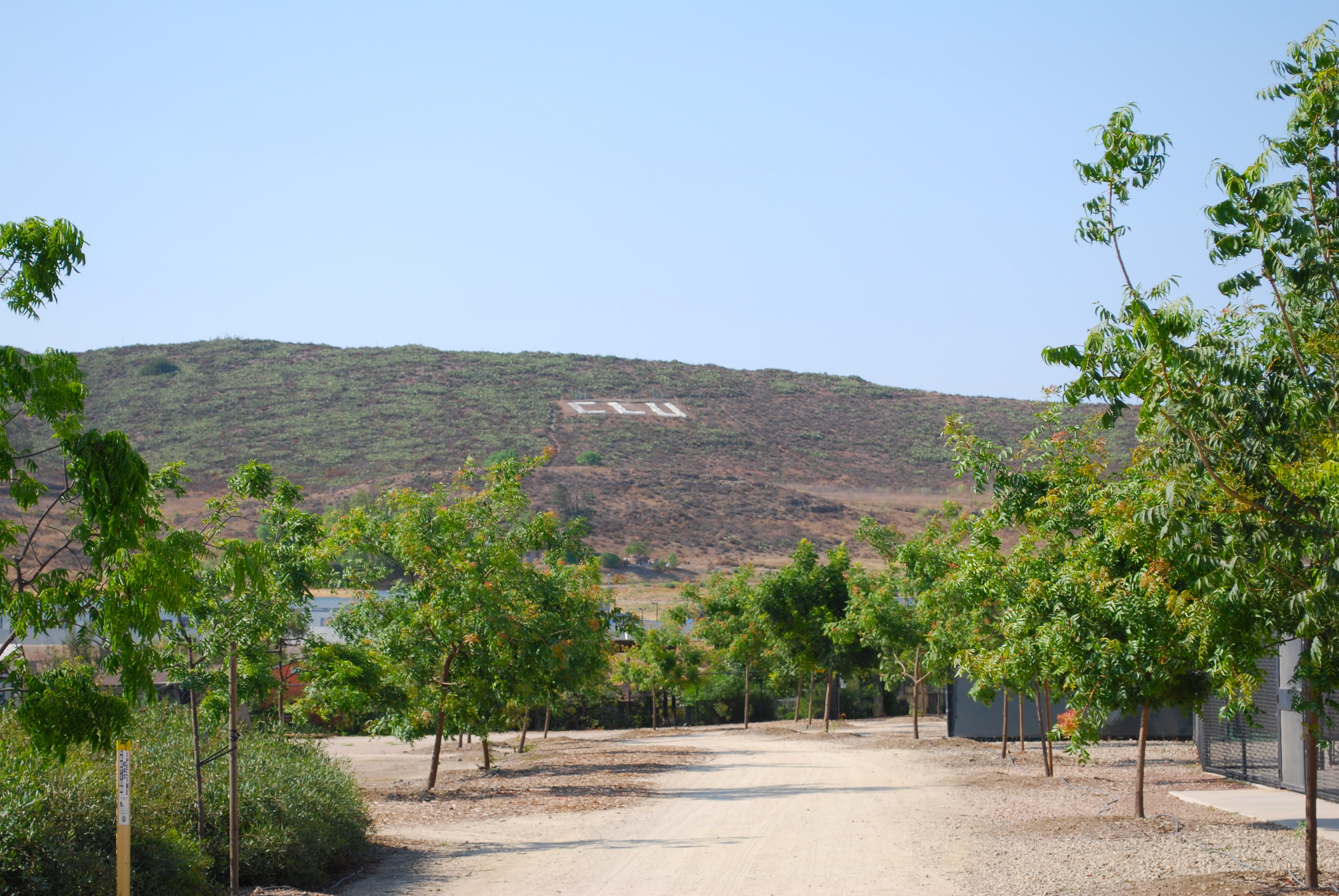
Iconic CLU hillside letters on Mount Clef Ridge at the university campus

- Enormous Luther ("Gumby") is a 5,000-pound (2,300 kg) abstract bronze statue of Martin Luther at Falde Plaza, immediately in front of Pearson Library. It is 25 feet (7.6 m) tall and has a 12-foot (3.7 m) wide cast. It was a gift of the first graduating class at California Lutheran College in 1964 and is the work of Bernardus Weber, CLU art professor emeritus. It has become an unofficial mascot of the university. Gumby was painted gold to commemorate CLU's 50th anniversary in 2009.
- Pederson House and Water Tower is located on the corner of Regent Ave. and Faculty St. on the university campus. Originally built by Norwegian settlers who first arrived here in 1890, the 1913 house is Ventura County Historic Landmark No. 45 and City of Thousand Oaks Historical Landmark No. 3. It was originally located at the present location of Ahmanson Science Center, where a statue has been erected in honor of Richard Pederson. The structure was later relocated 500 feet (150 m) to its current location.
- Samuelson Chapel is a towering cross-topped landmark, which was established in 1990. The chapel has stained glass windows and a 39-rank, racker-action pipe organ.
- CLU Rocks on Mount Clef: Sometime during the college's second academic year in the early 1960s, students arranged pained white rocks spelling out "CLC" atop Mount Clef Ridge. For over a decade, the rocks were visible at night and used as a beacon for airline pilots due to lights being rigged to shine on them. Due to vandalism and the 1973 energy crisis, the college eventually decided to permanently turn off the lights. Periodically through the school's history, students have rearranged the rocks to spell out their displeasure over various campus issues. The rocks are annually repainted as part of a freshman orientation tradition for new students.

=== Kwan Fong Gallery of Art and Culture ===
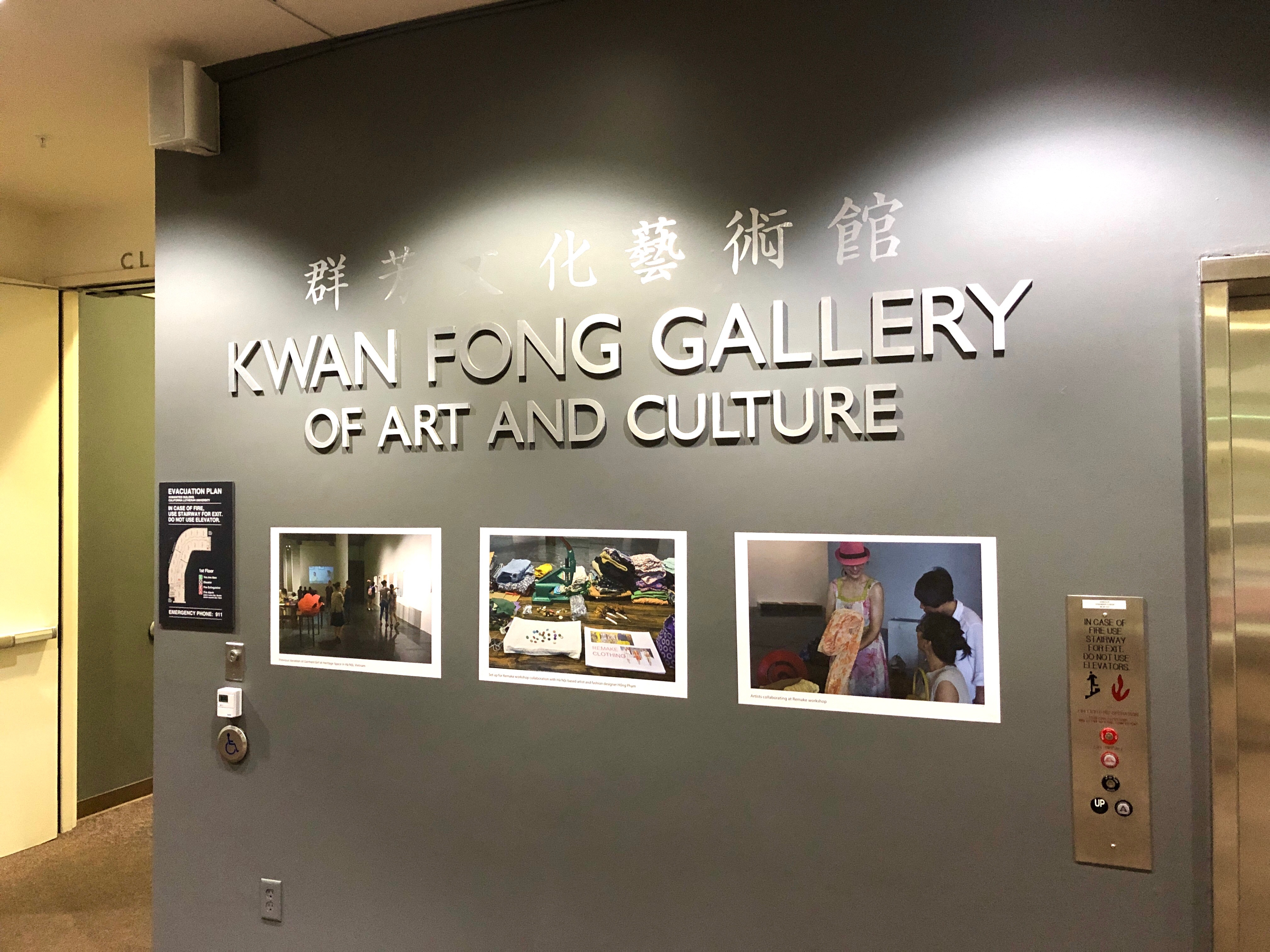
Kwan Fong Gallery of Art and Culture

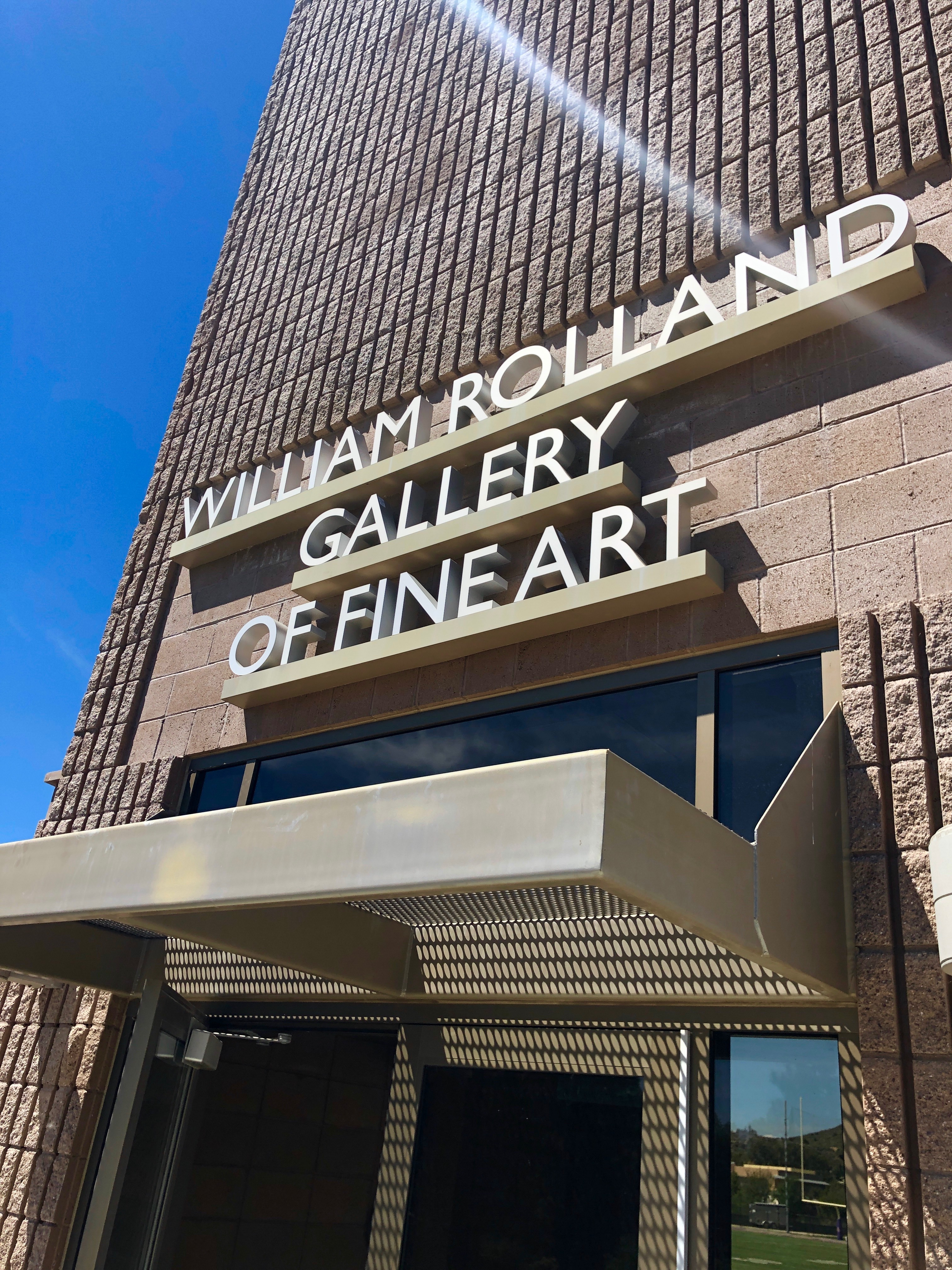
William Rolland Gallery of Fine Art

The Kwan Fong Gallery in the Soiland Humanities Center was established by the Kwan Fong Charitable Foundation, co-founded by Maria Lee and Katie Yang, with the participation of Ed Tseng, professor emeritus of Political Science of CLU and Dean of International Education. The foundation, which supported hospitals, schools, and homes for the elderly and mentally challenged, dissolved in 2006.

The gallery has residencies by artists, the first in 2007 by Dallas–Fort Worth-based figurative painter Cyn McCurry.

=== William Rolland Gallery of Fine Art ===
The William Rolland Gallery of Fine Art was established by philanthropist William Rolland on the university's campus in 2011. The gallery provides free public programming including lectures, foreign-language tours, and concerts. Exhibitions rotate approximately five times per year and have featured works from artists such as Andy Warhol, Chuck Close, David Hockney, Fernando Botero, Diego Lasansky, and Picasso.

In October 2017, the nearby William Rolland Art Center was dedicated. The $8-million facility is the third building donated by the philanthropist. Rollan was the 2017 Ventura County philanthropist of the year and has donated numerous times to CLU with the intent of making Cal Lutheran one of the leading schools in California.

=== Barbara Collins Arboretum ===
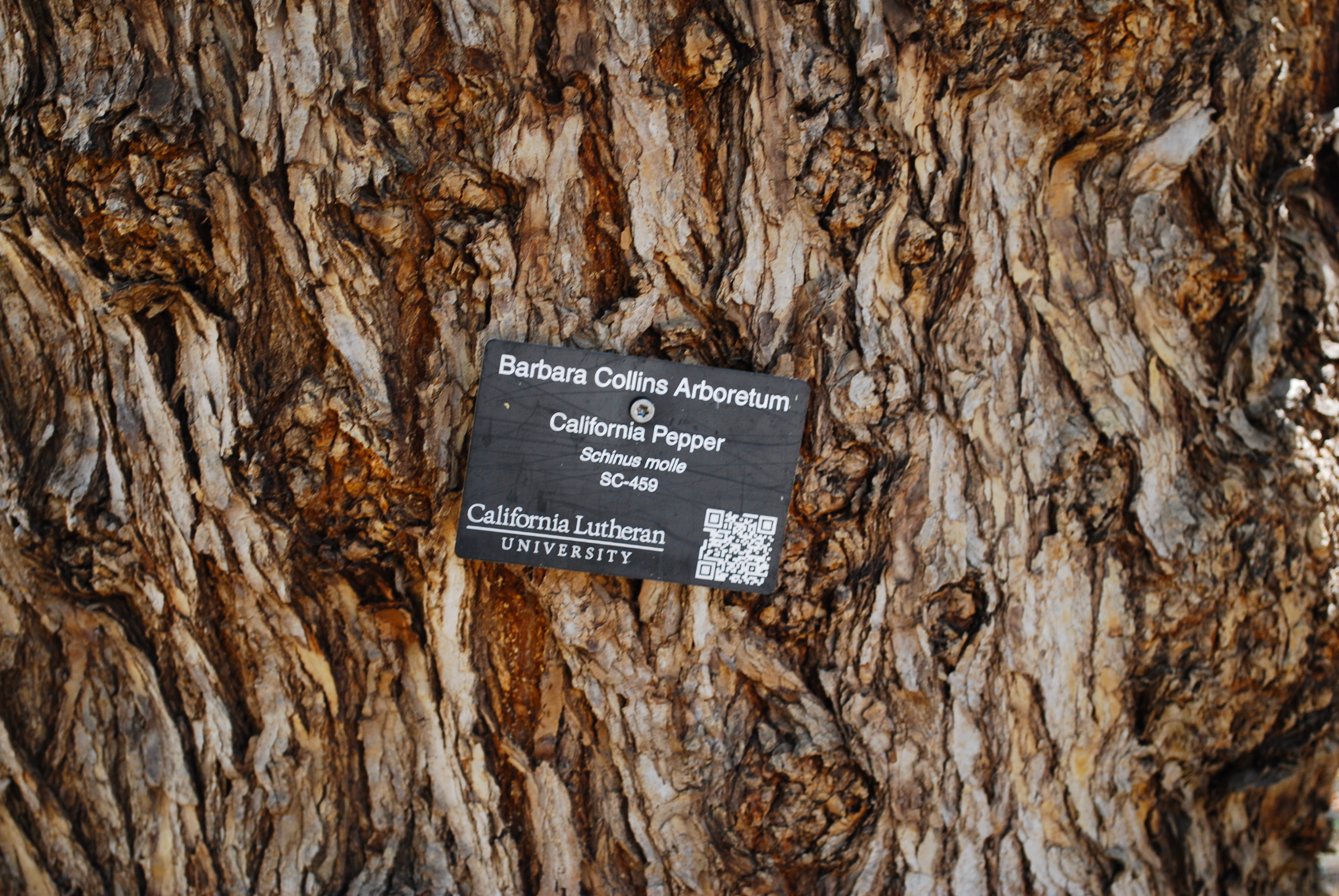
Label by Barbara Collins Arboretum at a Pepper tree by Pearson Library

The grounds of the campus is dubbed the Barbara Collins Arboretum. Named after Barbara J. Collins, who taught microbiology and botany at CLU for 50 years, the arboretum selected and cataloged much of the campus flora. Many of the trees flank a natural creek that bisects the campus. Many native species to Southern California can be found on campus, including Campus Gardens, Garden flowers, Canadian flowers, and California wildflowers. The arboretum opened in 2007 and Collins collected and identified over 100 species for the arboretum. Barbara J. Collins was a professor of biology for fifty years at Cal Lutheran. Besides the founder of the arboretum, she was the department chair and the sole member of the Interdisciplinary Major Committee for thirty years. President John Sladek made the announcement during his inauguration in 2006 that the campus had been recognized as an Arboretum.

=== Off-campus facilities ===
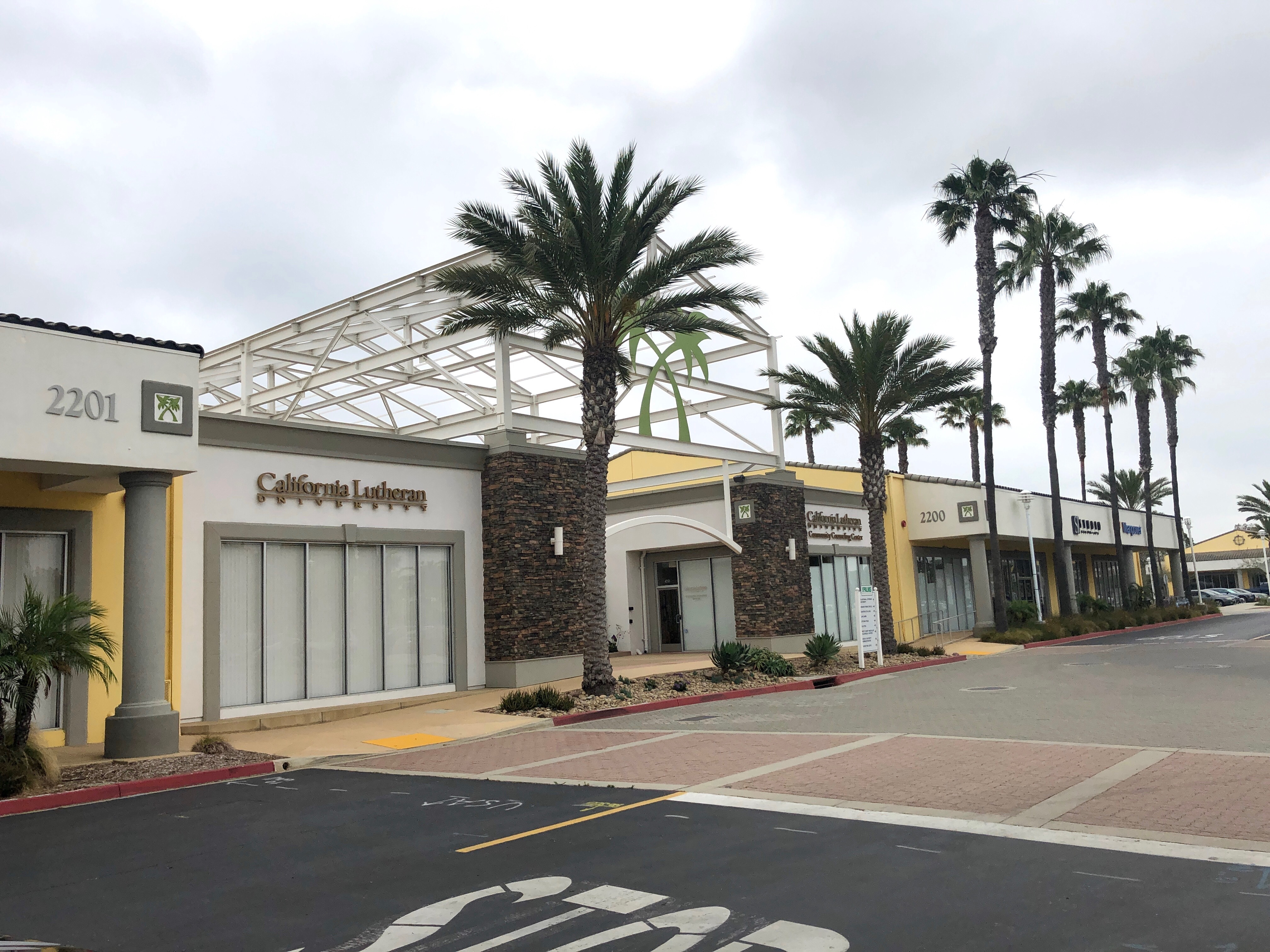
Cal Lutheran Oxnard Center

Cal Lutheran operates additional locations in Woodland Hills (Los Angeles), Westlake Village, Oxnard, Santa Maria, and Berkeley. As of January 2019, seven classes are offered at its Oxnard Center and three at the Woodland Hills Center. While the Pacific Lutheran Theological Seminary is located at the Berkeley campus, the 18,000 sq. ft. Westlake Village facilities house Cal Lutheran Center for Innovation and Entrepreneurship / Hub101. The Westlake Center, which opened in 2014, also houses expanded facilities for the Community Counseling Center and School of Management. The graduate programs in both entrepreneurship and economics have been relocated to the center, which is made up of four classrooms and five offices. It is the third center for the Community Counseling Center, which also operates at the Thousand Oaks and Oxnard campuses.

The Woodland Hills Center, which makes up 13,000 sq. ft. opened in 2011 and has eight classrooms and two computer labs. Several of the university's undergraduate and graduate programs are offered in Woodland Hills, including the MBA program and master's degrees in counseling and guidance. Over 100 students were enrolled in programs at the center in 2011.

The Central Coast program was launched in 2012 and houses the Educational Leadership Program in Santa Maria, California.

== Academic ==
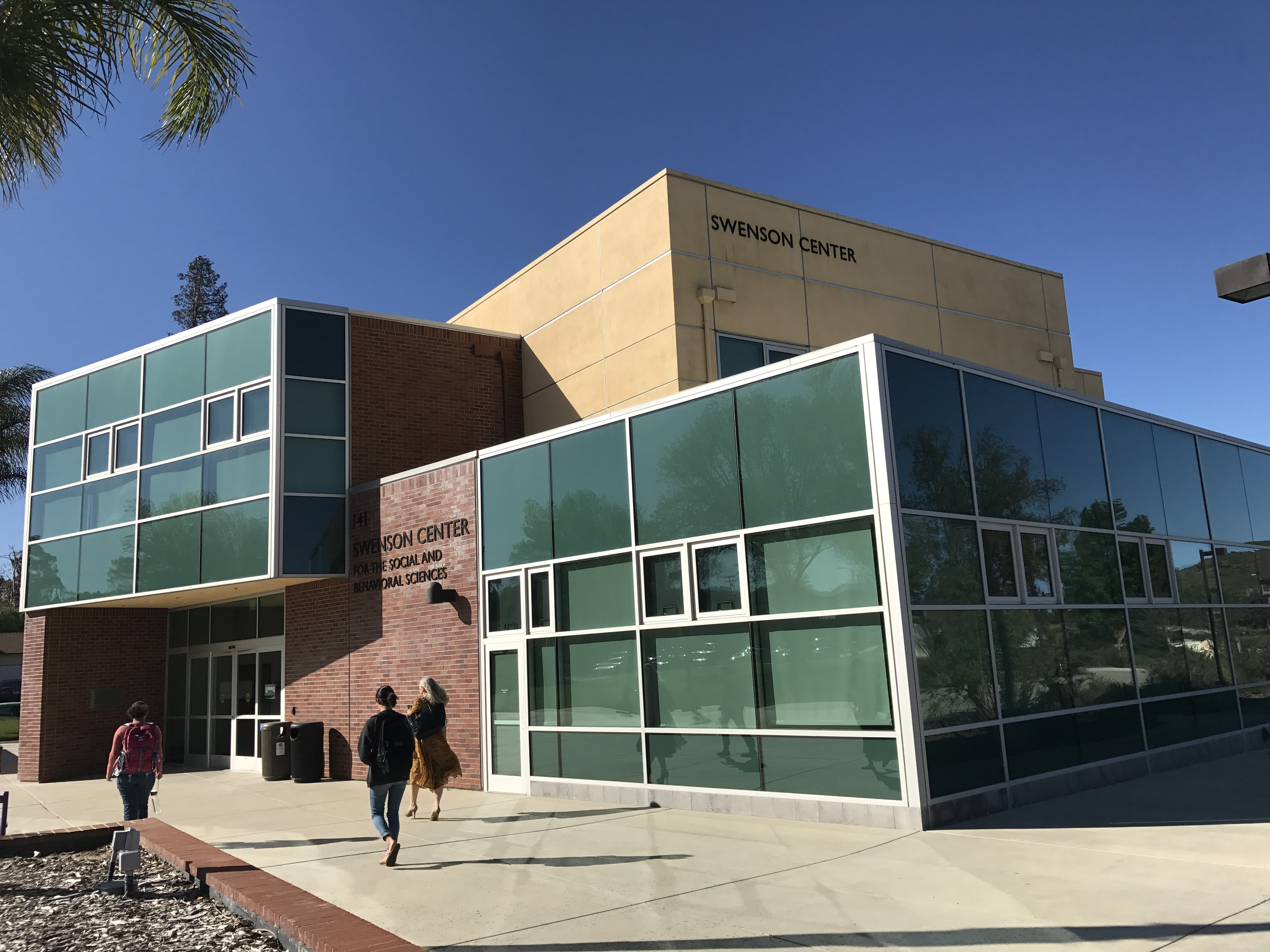
Swenson Center for Social and Behavioral Sciences

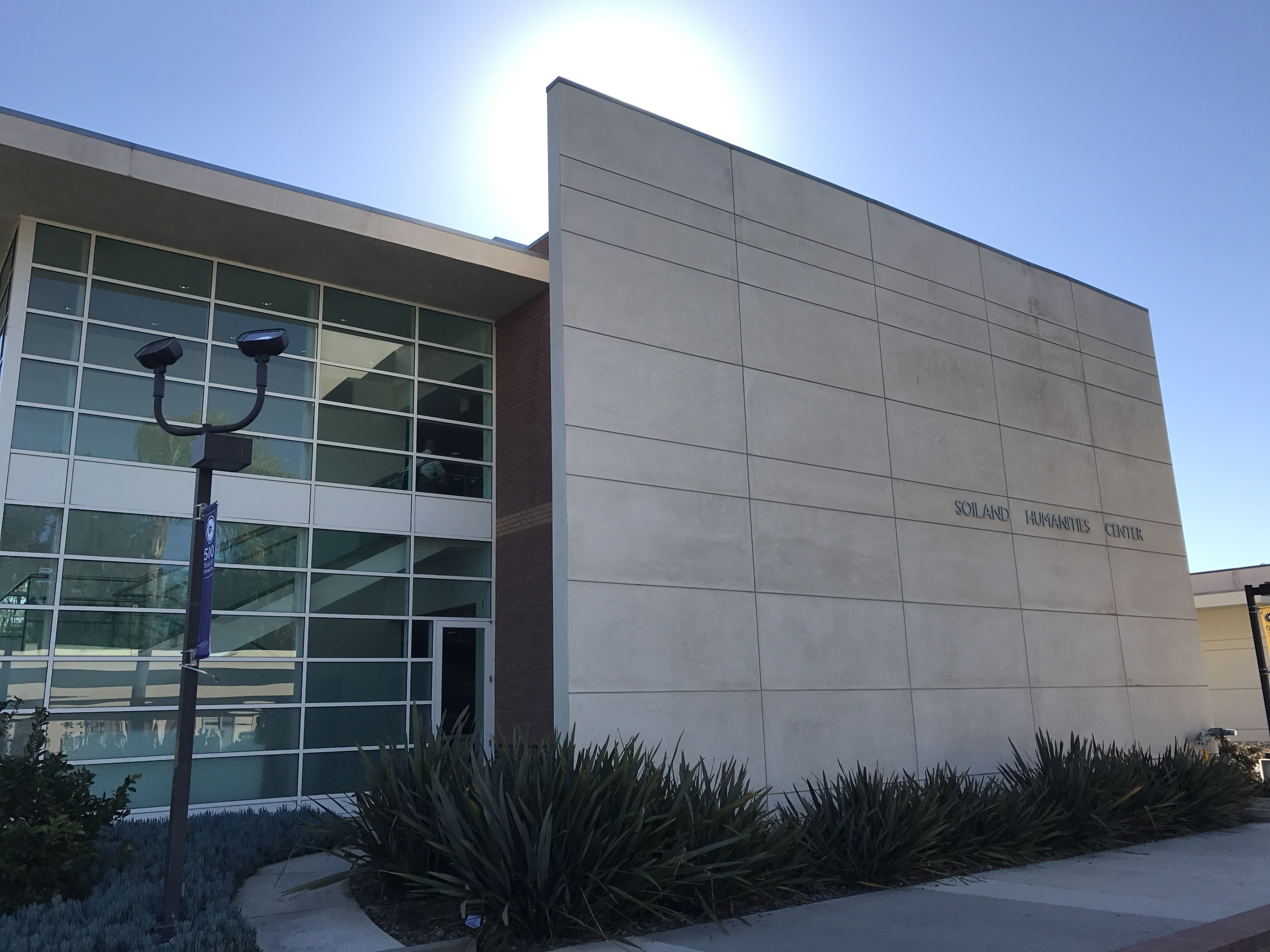
Soiland Humanities Center

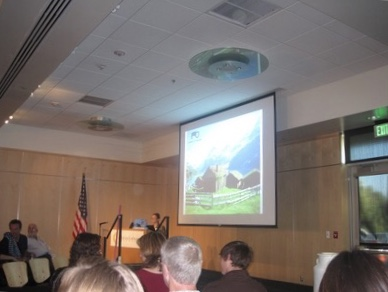
Lecture at CLU

California Lutheran University has five academic divisions:

- College of Arts and Sciences
- School of Management
- Graduate School of Education
- Graduate School of Psychology
- Bachelor's Degree for Professionals

Across all divisions, class sizes are kept small—16 students on average. CLU offers undergraduate students either a Bachelor of Arts or a Bachelor of Science degree, depending on their field of study, in 36 academic majors and 36 minors, with the ability to double-major. Additionally, a program for working professionals returning to college enables students to complete bachelor's degrees via evening and online courses.

The university's Graduate and Continuing Education Program had a modest beginning in 1970 but grew under the direction of John Cooper. At its beginning, the graduate program offered degrees in Administration of Justice, Business Administration, Education, and later Educational Psychology, Marriage and Family Counseling, and Public Administration. As of 2016, 1,300 graduate students were pursuing master's degrees in information technology, business, education, psychology, and public policy. There are 30 graduate programs offering credentials, certifications, and doctorate degrees.

The following degrees are offered:

- Baccalaureate: Bachelor of Arts (B.A.), Bachelor of Science (B.S.)
- Master's: Master of Arts (M.A.), Master of Business Administration (M.B.A.), Master of Education (M.Ed.), Master of Public Policy and Administration (M.P.P.A.), Master of Science (M.S.)
- Doctoral: Doctor of Education (Ed.D.), Doctor of Psychology (Psy.D.)

Additionally, master's and doctoral programs in theology and divinity are offered at the Berkeley facilities through the Pacific Lutheran Theological Seminary (PLTS).

=== College of Arts and Sciences ===
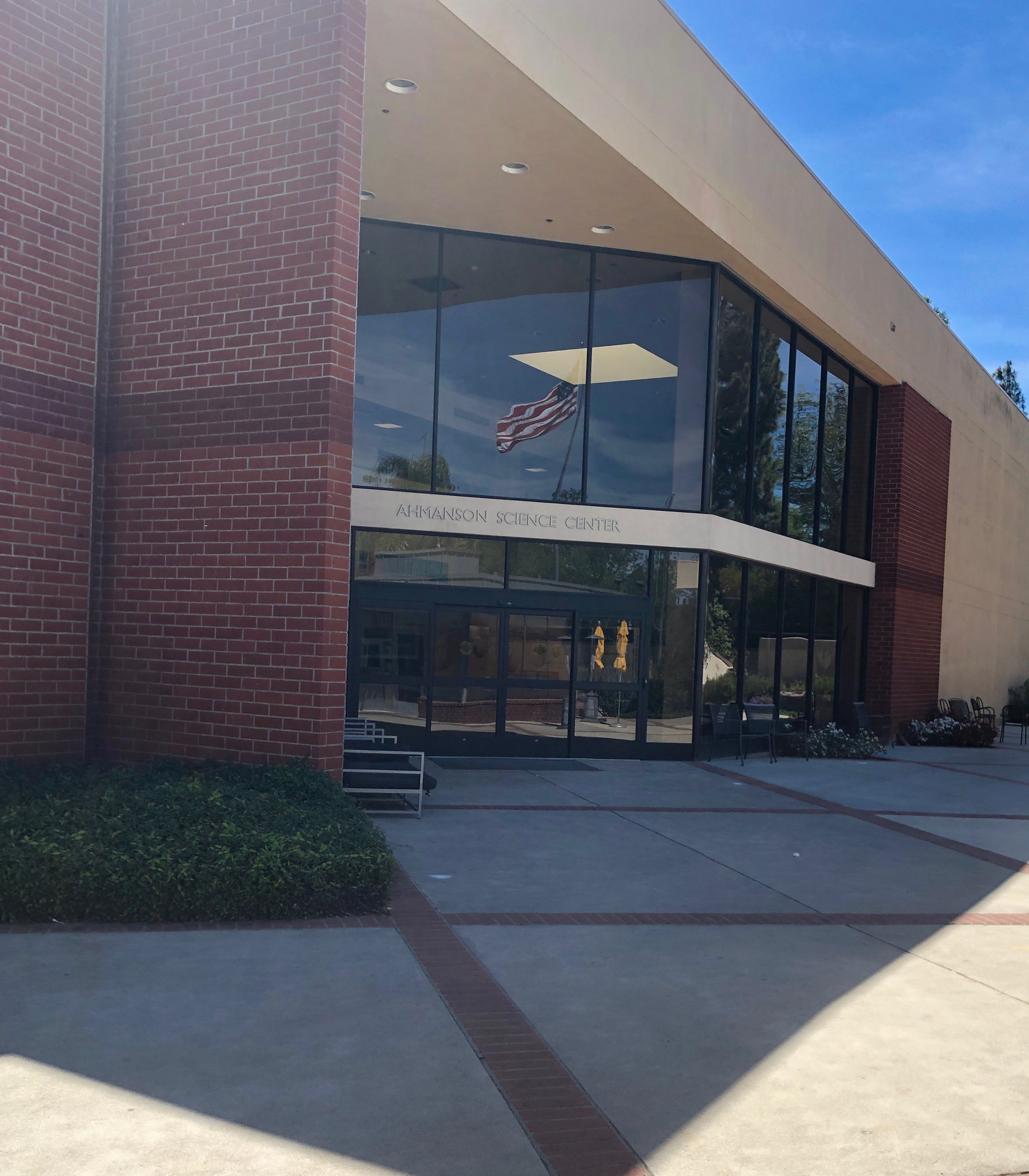
Ahmanson Science Center

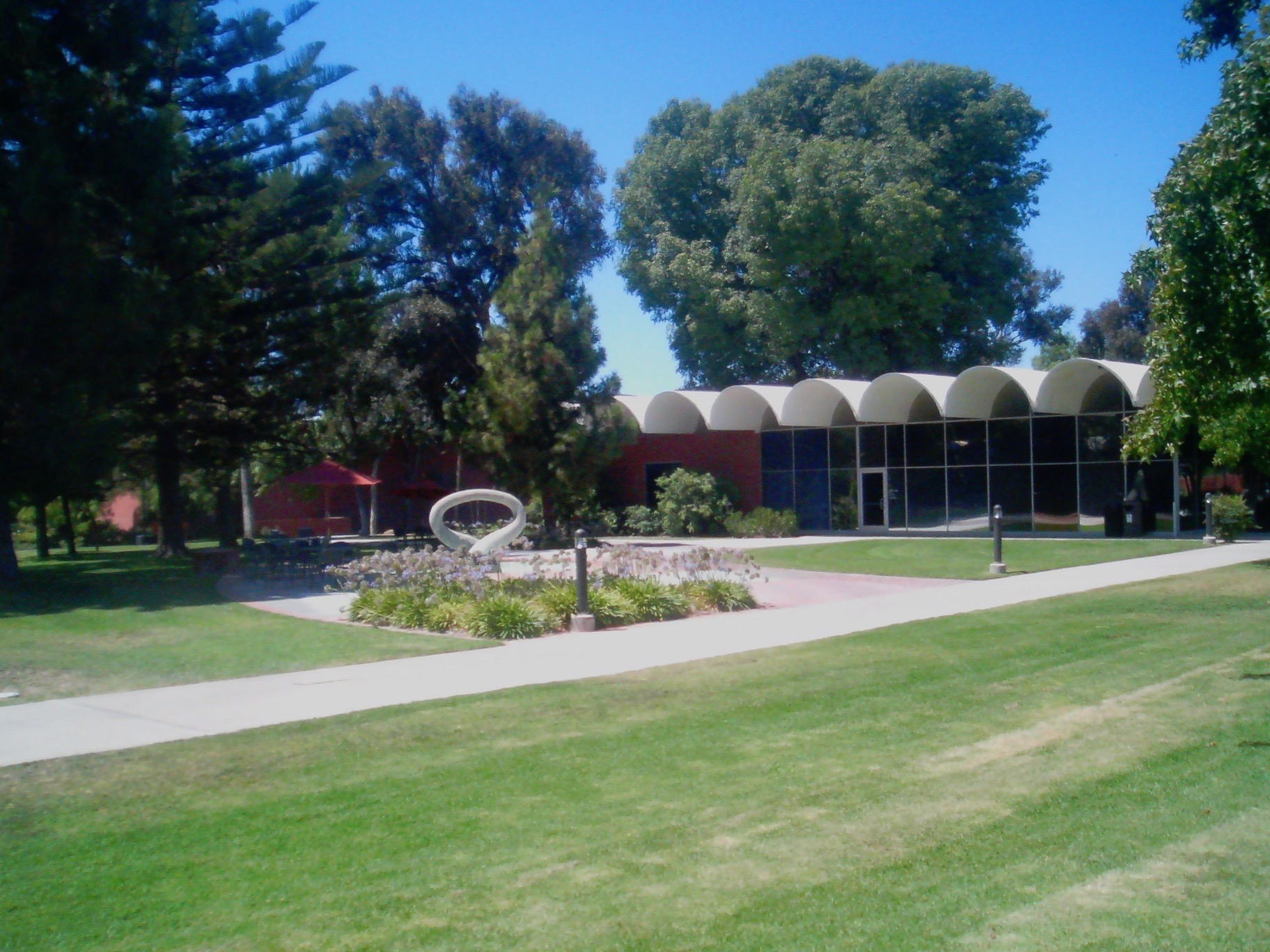
All Nations Plaza

A vast majority of the school's academic departments are in the College of Arts and Sciences, with 33 majors.

==== Graduate programs ====
For graduate students, the College of Arts and Sciences contains master's degree programs in psychology, computer science, clinical psychology, counseling psychology (MFT), and public policy and administration. Some undergraduate students who intend to enter one of these programs upon completion of their undergraduate studies can choose to enroll in some graduate courses as an undergraduate and obtain graduate-level course credits.

=== School of Management ===
California Lutheran University's first graduating class included students with degrees in Business Administration and Economics. Then, the Department of Business was housed within the College of Arts and Sciences until 1986, when it finally became a separate School of Business. In 2011, the university's Board of Regents formally approved changing the name of the School of Business to the School of Management. Containing all of CLU's business-related programs, the California Lutheran University School of Management employs many professors who have earned respect in their chosen fields prior to becoming professors. In addition, some professors have come from senior executive backgrounds and offer real-world experiences. Students in the School of Management can major in Business Administration, Economics, Accounting, Hospitality and Tourism Management, and Sports Management. The School of Management has several locations on campus, including Peters Hall, dedicated on Founders Day, October 23, 1981, during the first academic year of CLU President Jerry H. Miller. A substantial bequest to the college was given by Mrs. Magda Peters in memory of her late husband Rev. John Peters, a pioneering minister.

In 2018, the School received a substantial gift from Steven D. Dorfman, the former CEO of Hughes Space and Communications Company and vice-chairman of Hughes Electronics. The School of Management at CLU offers a range of graduate programs as well as a variety of certificate programs. All programs are accredited by WASC. Many foreign students come to CLU take the graduate IMBA Program. California Lutheran University School of Management's MBA program was ranked 66th in North America by The 2010 QS World University Rankings. Besides various Masters of Business Administration (MBA) degrees, other School of Management graduate programs include an Executive MBA, a Master in Management, Master of Science (MS) in Financial Planning, Management, Quantitative Economics, and Information Technology. The School of Management also has a Master of Public Policy and Administration (MPPA) degree, which is a multidisciplinary master's program. In addition to its programs, the School of Management operates a Center for Economic Research and Forecasting, which is part of the Wall Street Journal's panel of economic forecasters, a Center for Economic Research and Forecasting, as well as a Center for Innovation and Entrepreneurship that houses Hub101, a community cowork and incubation space.

=== Graduate School of Education ===
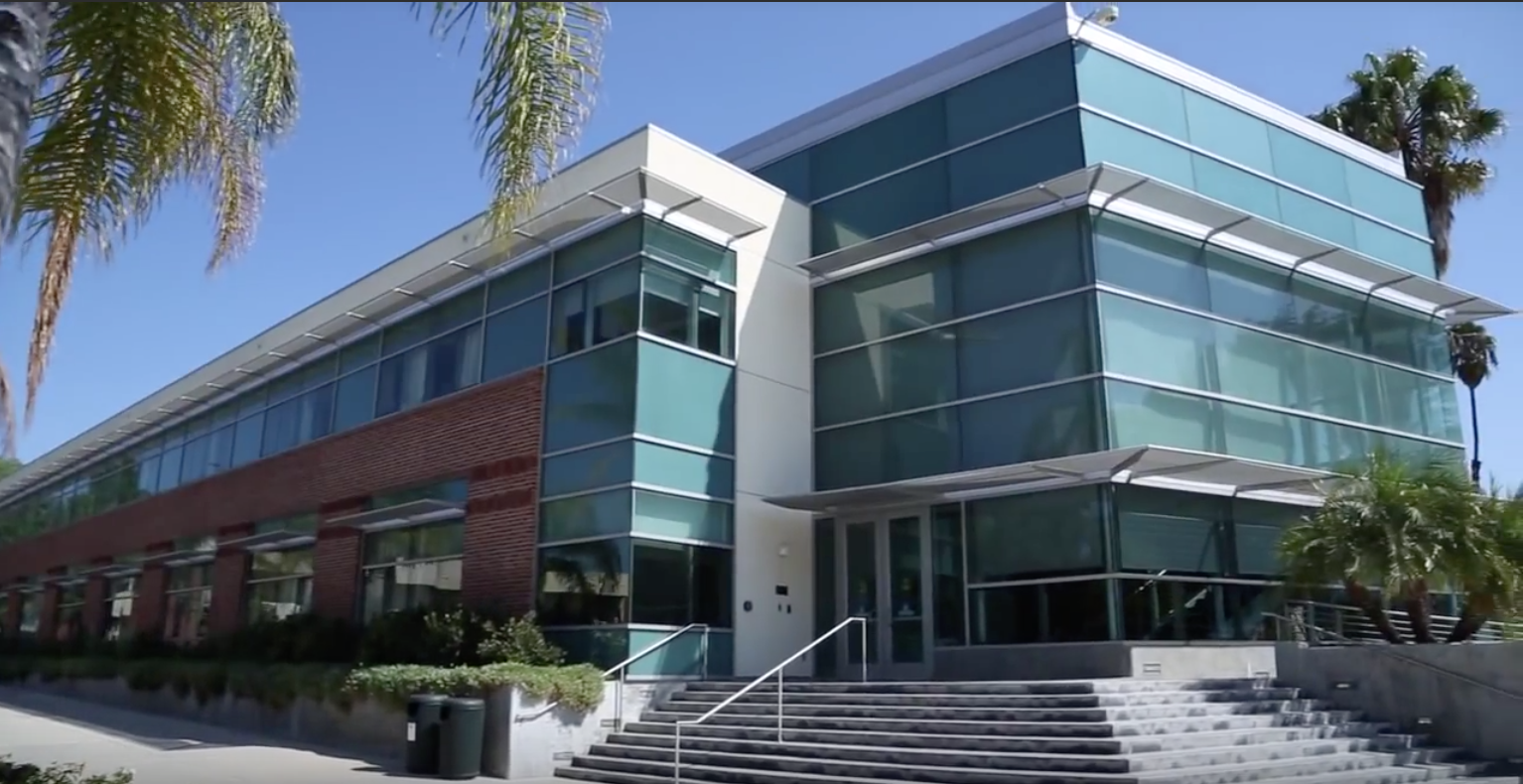
Spies Bornemann Center for Education & Technology

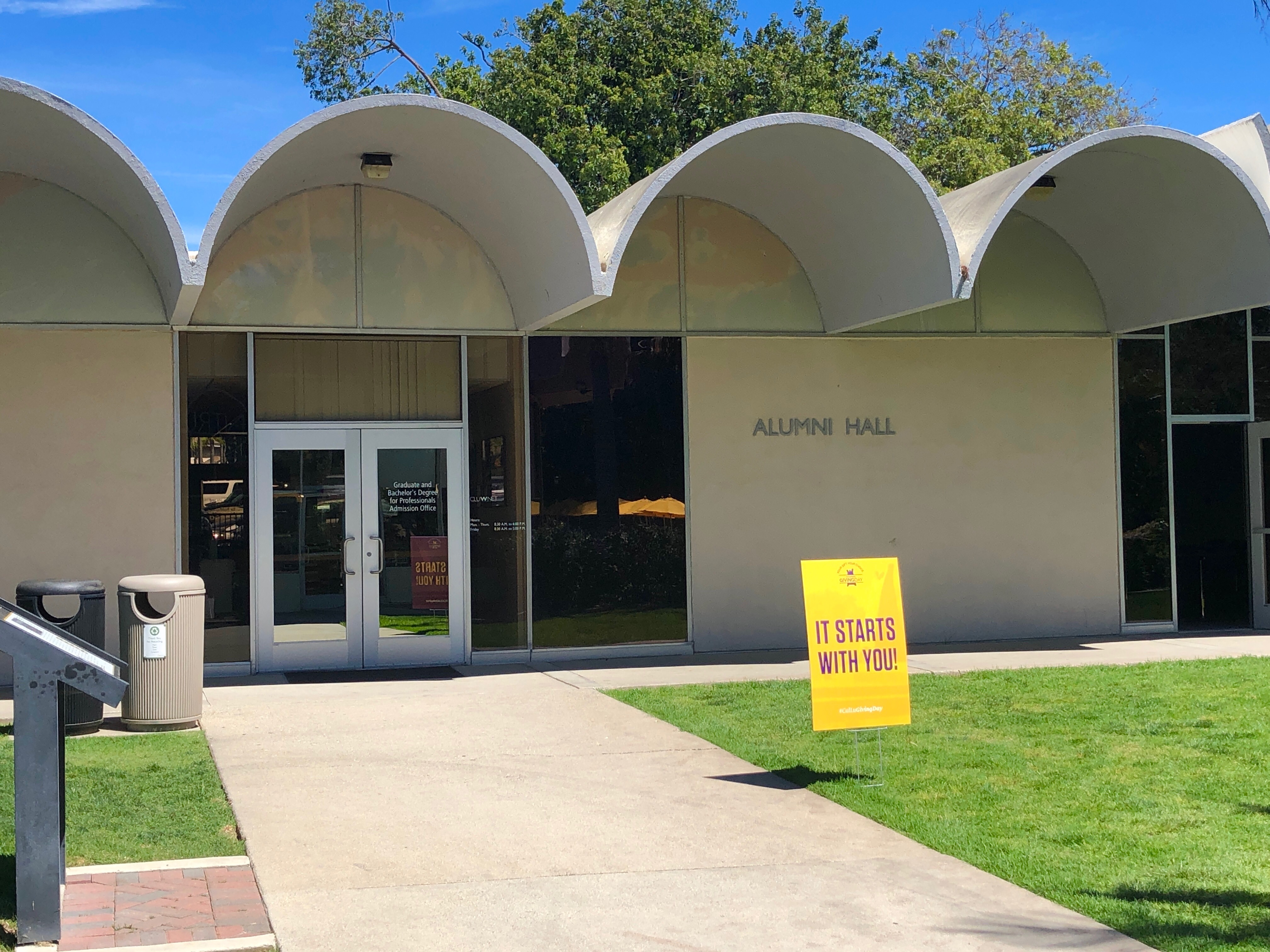
The Alumni Hall

California Lutheran University's School of Education trains teachers at the elementary, secondary, and post-secondary levels of instruction. It is based in the Spies-Bornemann Center for Education and Technology in the Academic Quarter. While primarily a graduate school, CLU undergraduate students can major in Liberal Studies, which qualifies them to teach elementary school and prepares them for the multiple-subject examinations (the CBEST and CSET) required by the State of California. While in this major, students take a Career Decisions in Education course that expose them to various facets of the education world and allows them to participate in field studies at local elementary schools.

There are multiple master's degree programs within the School of Education, as well as the Teacher Preparation program for California teachers. Students are able to obtain a teaching credential while at the same time earning credit toward their Master of Education (M.Ed.) degree. In addition to the Teacher Preparation program, students can obtain a Master of Science in counseling and guidance or educational psychology, and a Master of Arts in a wide variety of education-related administrative career fields, including educational technology, educational leadership, or school site leadership. Graduate students can also obtain a Doctor of Education (Ed.D.) degree in educational leadership from the School of Education. This program requires extensive fieldwork and a dissertation defense.

=== Graduate School of Psychology ===
The Graduate School of Psychology has three academic programs and two counseling centers. The school offers an APA-accredited doctorate in clinical psychology (Psy.D) and Master of Science degrees in clinical psychology and counseling psychology (MFT). The counseling centers provide low-fee services to residents of Ventura and Los Angeles counties and are located in Oxnard and Westlake Village. Graduate students provide the clinical services at the counseling centers and are overseen by a clinic director, assistant clinic director, and 15 licensed supervisors.

=== Bachelor's Degree for Professionals ===
Formally named the Adult Degree Evening Program (ADEP), the bachelor's degree for Professionals is aimed at working professionals who want to earn a bachelor's degree in a compressed timeline. Courses are offered in the evenings at the main Thousand Oaks campus as well as at satellite campuses in Woodland Hills and Oxnard.

=== Special programs ===
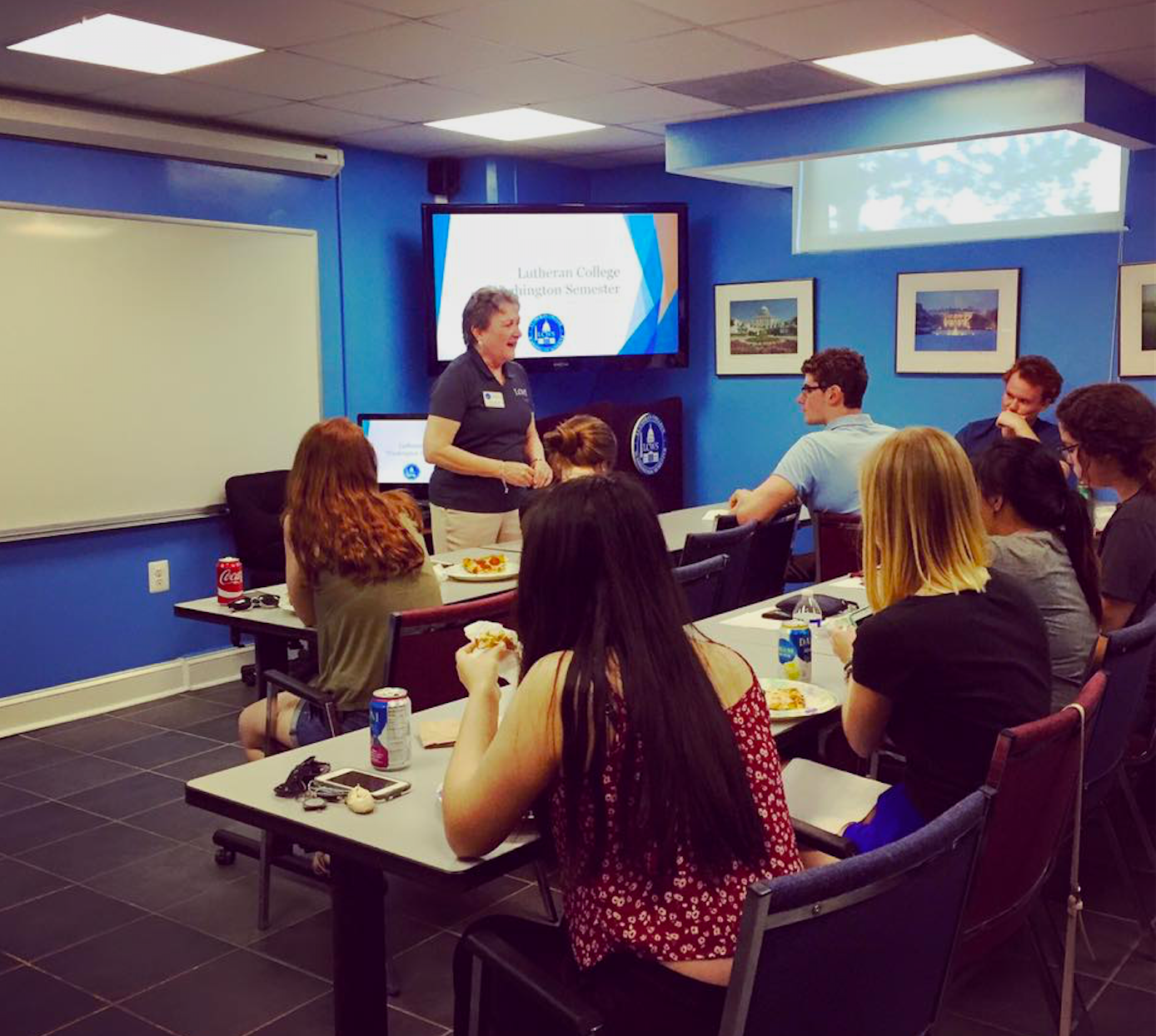
CLU offers semesters off-campus at Lutheran College Washington Semester (LCWS) in Washington, DC.

Special academic programs include an honors program, cooperative (work-study) education, accelerated degree programs, study abroad, advanced placement credit, self-designed majors, part-time degrees, adult education programs, internships, weekend programs, summer sessions, independent studies, double majors, and more. Study abroad programs, internships and exchange programs are offered in countries such as Australia, Belgium, Germany, Hong Kong, India, Mexico, Sweden, Tanzania, and Thailand. The university has an arrangement for off-campus studies at Wagner College, American University ("Washington, D.C. Semester"). The Washington, D.C., program is open for students in every field of study and allows students to live, work and study for one semester in Washington. While completing a professional internship and taking academic night courses, they also participate in various field trips, seminars, orientation sessions, etc. Students are housed in furnished condominiums situated across the Potomac River in the Rosslyn area of Arlington, Virginia.

Amgen, the world's largest biotechnology company, and Baxalta are located near Cal Lutheran and hire graduates each year. As of 1995, CLU had 65 Amgen employees enrolled in its adult education program. Amgen and Cal Lutheran have also held partnership lecture series.

== Creative arts ==
=== Music Department ===
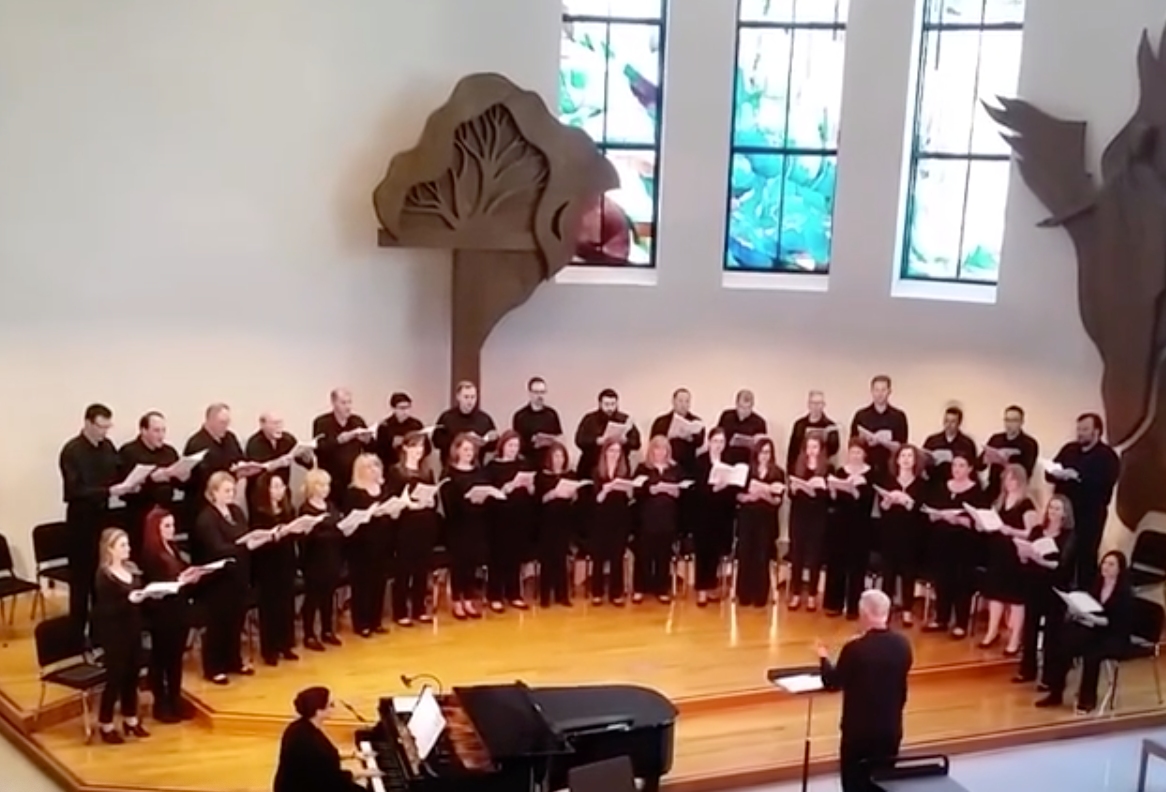
Choir at Cal Lutheran

Creative arts have been an important part of the college since its first opening in the fall of 1961. The college's first music department was set up by choir director C. Robert Zimmerman. Joining the staff early on to provide orchestral direction was Walter Birkedahl, who stayed until 1965. Another pioneer faculty member was violinist Betty Shirey Bowen, who rehearsed and built string sections of the college orchestra. As the founding conductor of the Youth Symphony Orchestra, she was also the founding concertmistress of the CLC Conejo Symphony Orchestra. Others included Art Moorefield, a teacher of music history and former instructor at Cincinnati Conservatory of Music, and Carl Swanson, a graduate of Augustana College, Rock Island, and Gert Muser, a voice teacher trained in Germany. The concert and chapel choirs had their first performance during the CLC's dedication in October 1961. A highlight of the dedication was "A Mighty Fortress Is Our God" performed by the newly formed orchestra and choir. The premiere performance of the orchestra was held in December 1961 at the Newbury Park Academy in neighboring Newbury Park, CA. The 37-member choir performed shortly thereafter at the Holy Trinity Lutheran Church on the college campus. The first choir tour was held in early 1962 and began the tradition of annual tours, first and foremost to the Southwest, but also in the Pacific Northwest and Hawai’i. In the early 1970s, the orchestra and choir held their initial appearance at the Music Center in Los Angeles where they performed in the Dorothy Chandler Pavilion. During the 1970s, guest artists such as Roger Williams, Myron Floren, Gordon MacRae, Marni Nixon, Florence Henderson, and others made their appearance on CLC concert tours.

Elmer Ramsey formed the Conejo Pops Orchestra, which is made up of alumni. The orchestra has performed with Tex Beneke, Harry James and Glenn Miller orchestras. Ramsey also founded and was the conductor of Conejo Symphony Orchestra, which was a precursor to the present-day New West Symphony.

Some early musicals included H.M.S. Pinafore, South Pacific, Pirates of Penzance, Man of La Mancha, The Music Man, Oklahoma!, and Fiddler on the Roof. Although the CLC-Conejo Symphony Orchestra had operated as an independent organization with its own board of directors, the orchestra had many student members and presented its concerts in the college auditorium for many decades.

Besides tours throughout the United States, the choir has also arranged international tours to England, Italy, Norway, and Sweden. They have performed at venues such as St. Peter's Basilica in Rome, Bergen Cathedral in Norway, the Coventry and York Minster cathedrals in the UK, and the Avery Fisher Hall at Lincoln Center and Carnegie Hall in New York. Notable performers with the choir have included composer David Lang, Esa-Pekka Salonen, Steven Stucky, Henry Brant, Morten Lauridsen, Richard Elliott, and Grammy Award winners Eric Whitacre and Hila Plitmann.

=== Drama Department ===
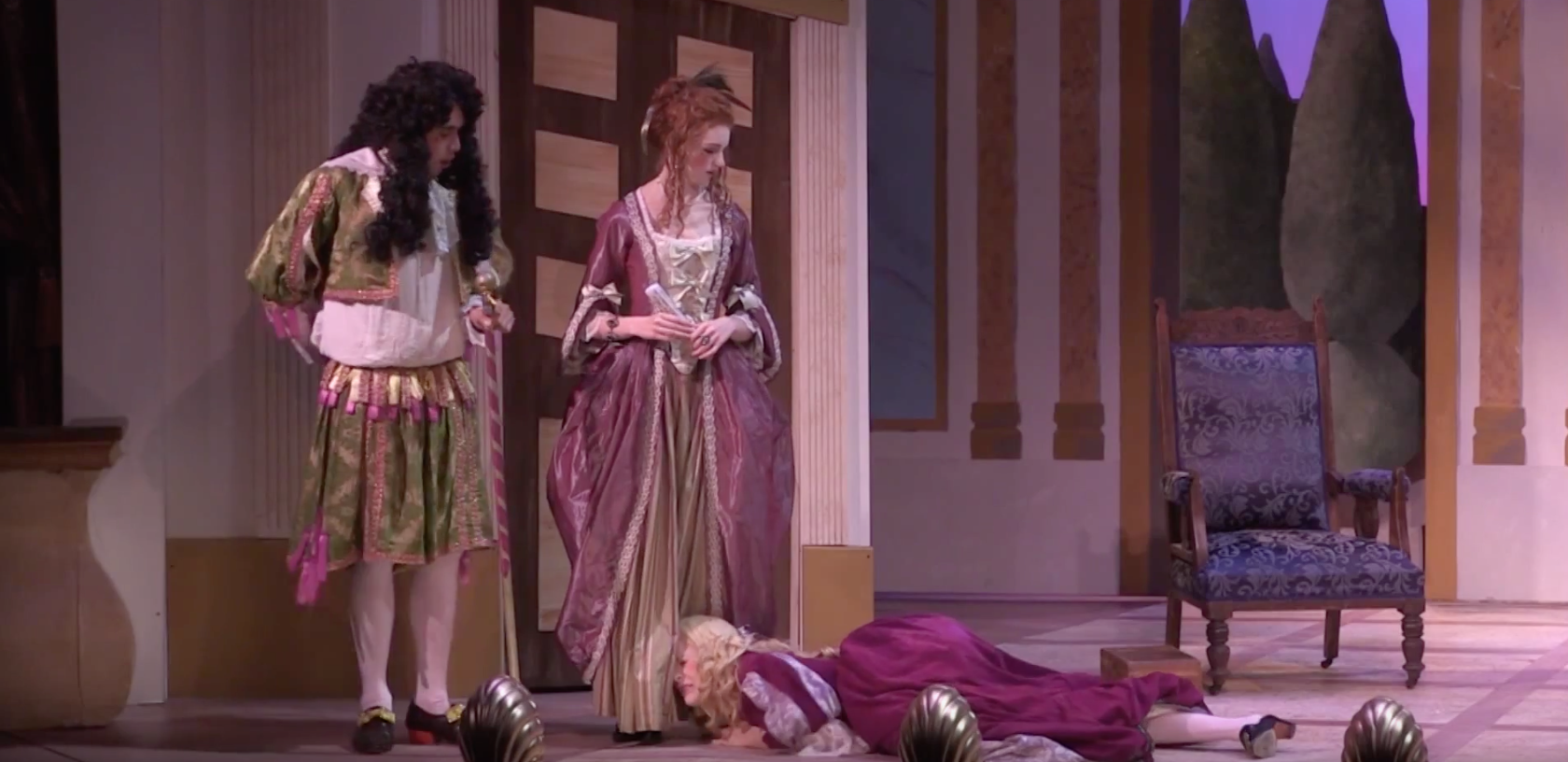
Theater Department performance at Preus-Brandt Forum Theatre

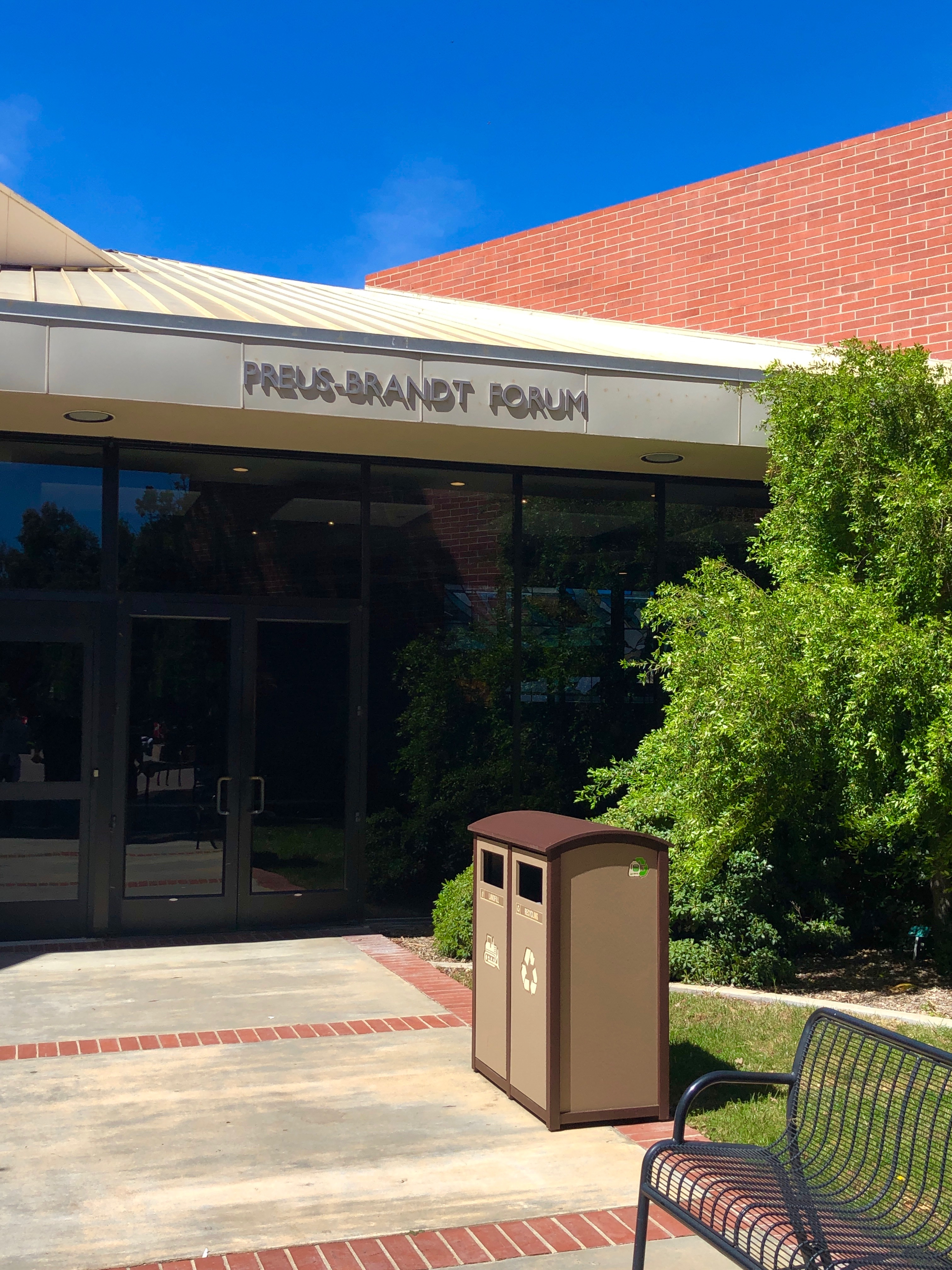
Preus-Brandt Forum

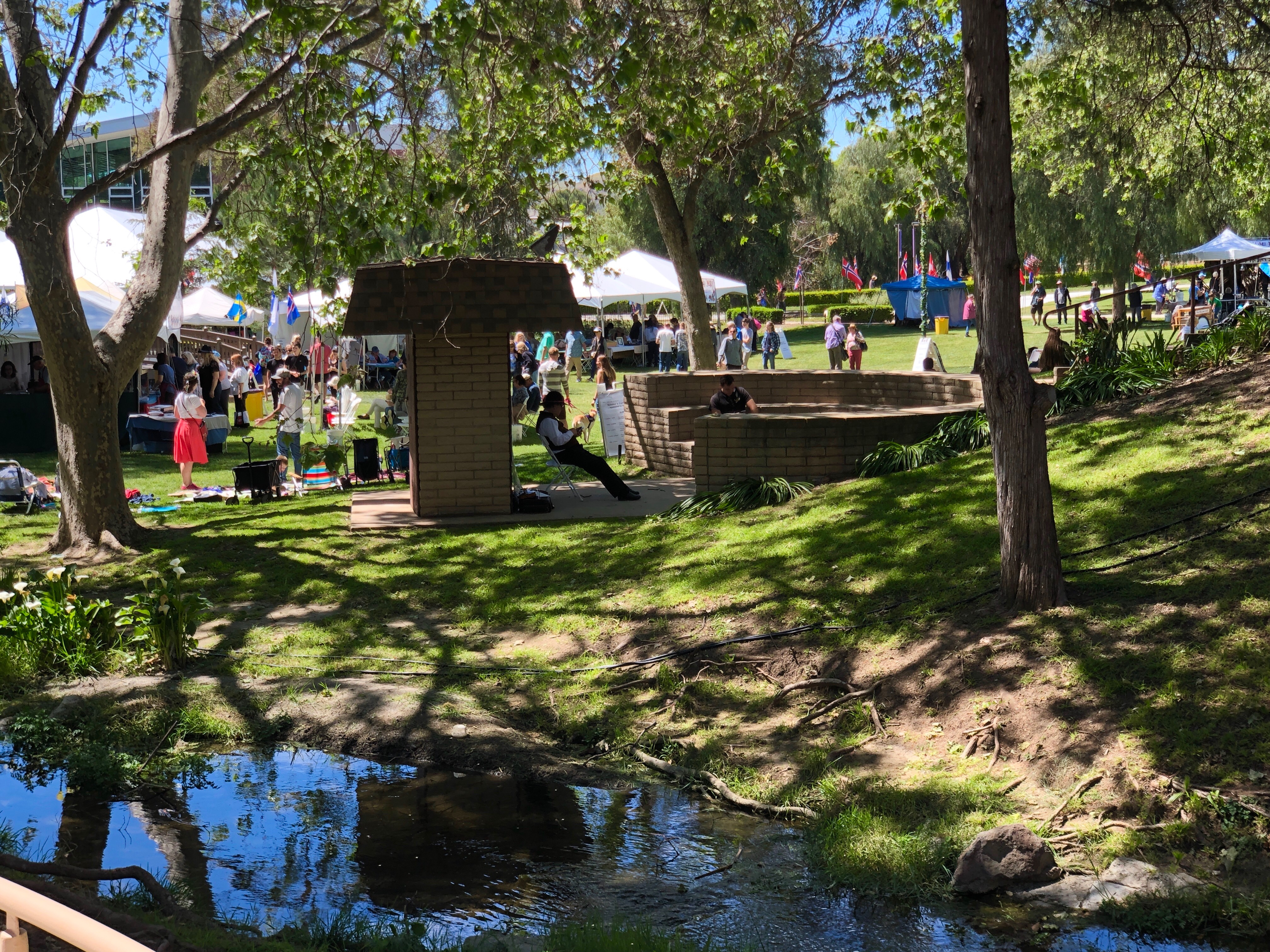
Mathews Learning Alcove Amphitheater in Kingsmen Park

The CLC Drama Department has been an integral part of the Creative Arts Division since the first semester. Every spring and fall, plays were presented and the Drama Department joined the Music- and Art Departments to present the Creative Arts Festivals, often performing plays from Shakespeare. Dale Melsness designed and directed one of the first productions, known as The Rivalry, a 1964 play based on the Lincoln-Douglas debates. One of the first plays produced was also "Knock Knock, Who’s Dead?", which ran for three nights in October 1964. Richard Adams joined the staff in 1965 and began training students in children's productions in 1966. Plays would be introduced at the campus Little Theatre before touring local Conejo Valley elementary schools. The first children's theatre production was "Land of the Dragon." Among the other plays in the early years were "Kind Lady" and “Death of a Salesman.” A high school drama was held on campus in February 1967 starring Buddy Ebsen, an actor known for his role in The Beverly Hillbillies. Another 1967 highlight was the celebration of the 500th anniversary for the Lutheran Reformation which was held in Los Angeles. Professor Powers scripted a program which was presented for 15,000 spectators. The CLC's Little Theatre was later transformed in the 1970s and became the headquarters for the college drama. A performer in the 1970s was Don Haskell, who later returned to CLC as an instructor and manager for the Audio Visual Department and television station. Another notable performer was Mike Eichman who in 1971 wrote “Caged”, and later went on to write new plays after leaving CLC.

Other notable drama performers at CLC included professor Elmer Ramsey's children, Janine Jessup and Douglas. Douglas would later work for a variety of Walt Disney productions, while Janine would later manage the Roscoe Dye Center in New York. A notable play at CLC was “I. Berlin,” which was directed by Don Haskell and staged in 1978. Another famous play was “The Glass Menagerie,” which was directed by Adams, a professor who helped stage over a hundred productions during his time at the college. A year prior to Adams’ retirement in 1984, Michael Arndt of Pacific Lutheran University was hired to run the Drama Department.

In 2003, the Mainstage Theatre production of Noël Coward’s "Hay Fever" was selected for performance at the American College Theatre Festival, which was held at Utah State University in February. As one of the eight productions selected from Region VIII, Hay Fever was automatically submitted for consideration for a performance at the Kennedy Center in Washington, D.C. CLU won its first national awards in 2019, when the school play "Columbinus" won two awards during the 2019 festival: a Distinguished Performance and Production Ensembles Award and a Citizen Artist Award. The play was one of seven picked for the festival among 200 plays from Southern California, Guam, Hawai'i, Arizona, Nevada, and Utah. It was also performed three times at the Los Angeles Theatre Center.

Actor Lane Davies has co-founded the Kingsmen Shakespeare Company in cooperation with the university. Kingsmen Shakespeare Company was listed, in 2004, as a Major Festival in the book Shakespeare Festivals Around the World by Marcus D. Gregio.

=== Visual Arts ===
The college's first art classes were held by art professor Gladys Hendricks in the remodeled Pederson garage adjacent to the Pederson Ranch house. Hendricks operated an art studio in Los Angeles and came to CLC from the Los Angeles City School system and had also taught at University of Kansas and Bethany College. During the CLC's second academic year, Bernardus "Ben" Weber and Jerald Slattum were hired in order to teach drawing, painting, pottery, and sculpture. Slattum, a graduate of Pacific Lutheran University, came to CLC after having had successful exhibitions at the Los Angeles County Museum as well as in New York and Tucson, Arizona, where he had received the Purchase Award. Weber worked in his own Thousand Oaks studio when approached and hired by President Dahl. Some of Weber's students continued their studies in the Netherlands through a special internship program initiated by Weber with glass and porcelain manufacturers. Some of these students later gained national reputations, including John Luebtow, Bill Payne, Bill Olson, Mark Gulsrud, and John Merkel.

Art exhibits by senior students are traditionally held each spring in the Art Department and is a requirement for receiving a bachelor's degree in art. In earlier years, exhibits were held monthly in the Student Union Building. The Art Department has for long played an important role in the Creative Arts Festival. It was through the work and efforts of art historian professor Jerald Slattum that the college acquired a collection of primitive New Guinea art through Ernest LaBoyteaux of Santa Barbara. Slattum annually took art students on international tours to countries such as Mexico, Bolivia, Peru, and Chile. In the early 1980s, the Art Department expanded to also include photography and hired an instructor to teach both beginning and advanced photography. A dark room was first created in the 1980s in order to handle photography student needs.

The Communication Department has a concentration in television and film productions, which offers courses such as Politics in Film and Film Theory. CLU also offers a bachelor's degree in multimedia, which includes a track for “high definition digital cinema.” Beginning in the fall of 2019, CLU is adding a film and television major with the choice of concentrating in production or film studies.

== Residence life ==
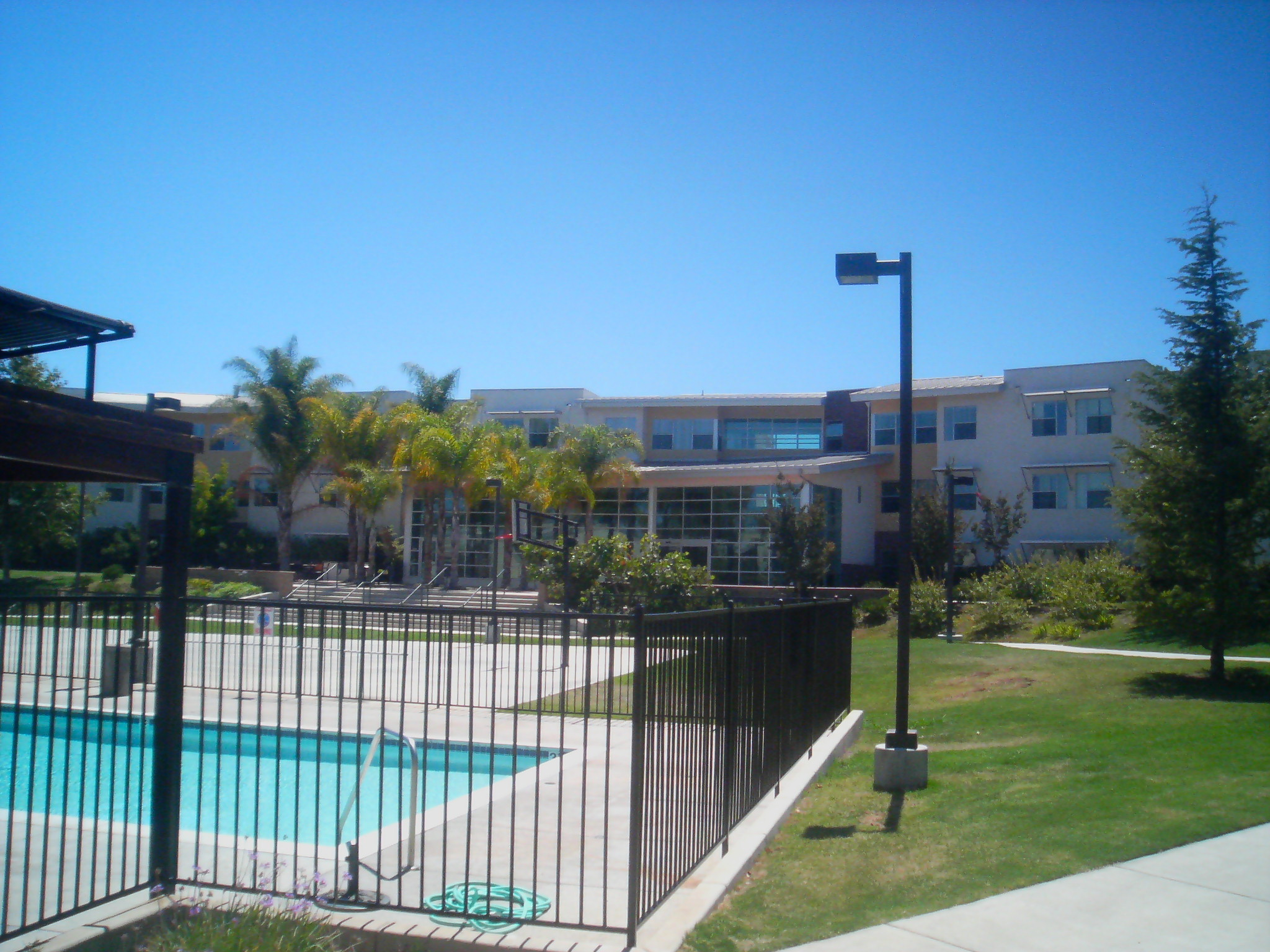
Swimming pool and basketball court by Grace Hall

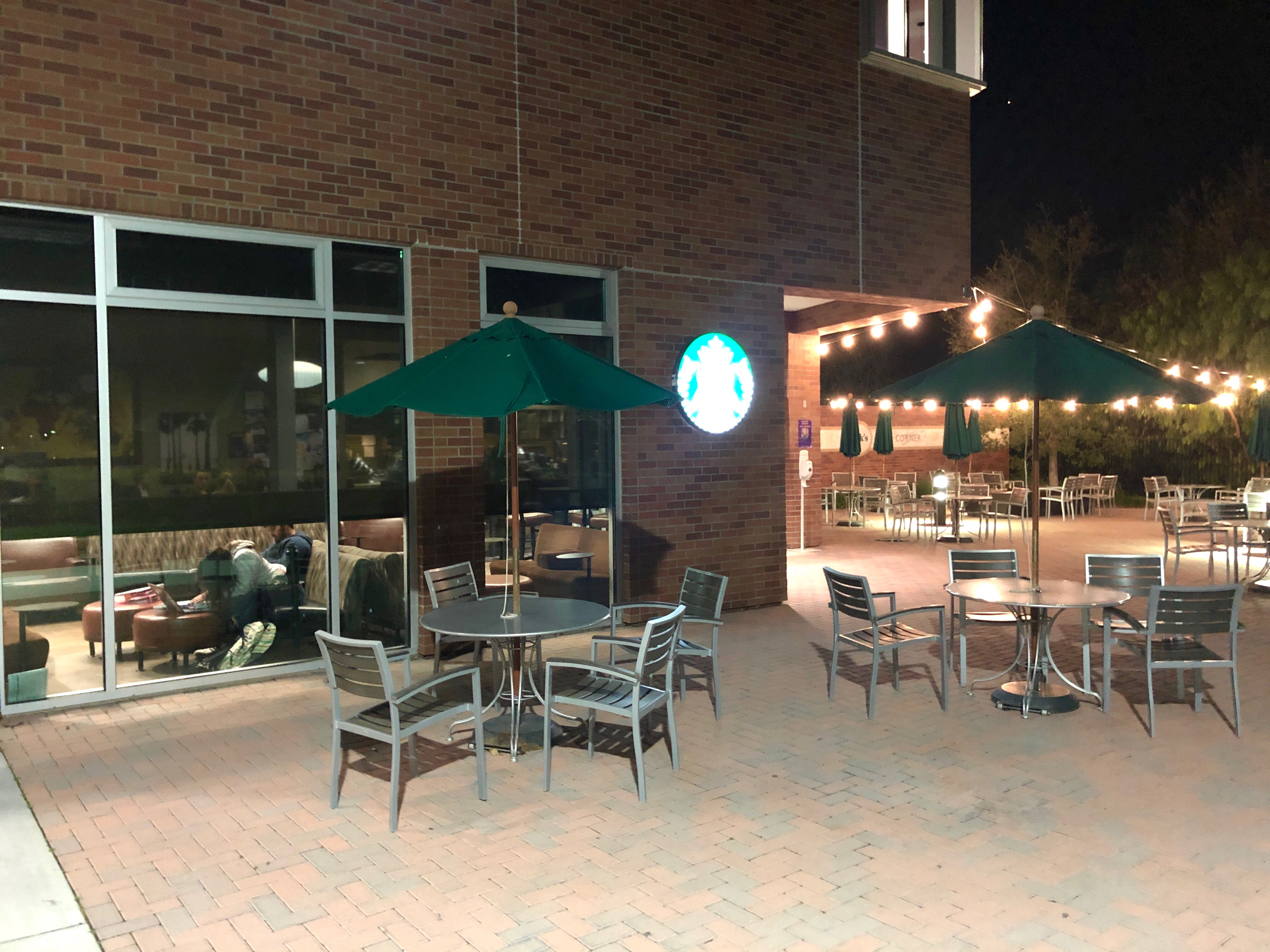
Starbucks at Ullman Commons is the largest in Ventura County.

California Lutheran University maintains a policy of guaranteed on-campus housing for all four years if students elect to do so. On-campus housing or living at home is required for freshmen and sophomores; however, juniors and seniors may elect to live off-campus with friends. 63% of the student body reside on campus as of 2011, while 88% of all freshmen students reside on campus. Alcohol is prohibited on campus.

=== Freshmen housing ===
Freshmen students living on-campus are eligible to live in one of three residence halls: Mount Clef, Pederson & Thompson, or New West Complex. Mount Clef, Pederson, and Thompson are located on the east side of campus, while New West is located on the west side. Mount Clef features a shared two-suite configuration, where two rooms are connected with a shared bathroom between them. Pederson & Thompson both have open courtyards in the center of the building. Each suite includes two bedrooms, a shared bathroom, and a living room. New West Complex suites include two bedrooms, a shared bathroom, and a living room. All freshmen residence halls include a kitchen which is shared by the building. Meal plans are required for freshmen, and meals are provided at the Ullman Dining Commons on campus.

=== Upperclassmen housing ===
Sophomore, junior and senior students are allowed to choose to live in a residence hall on the west side of campus. This area contains the New West Complex (comprising four buildings: North, South, West, and Potenberg halls), the Old West Complex (comprising four buildings: Afton, Janss, Rasmussen, and Conejo halls), the Mogen Hall Apartments, Grace Hall, and Trinity Hall. Traditionally, New West attracts much of the sophomore student body, Old West the juniors, and Mogen and Grace the seniors. However, in recent years there has been a virtual complete mixing of sophomores, juniors, and seniors all throughout Old West, New West, Mogen, Grace, and Trinity.

==== Special housing options and graduate housing ====
Kramer Court is a special housing option for undergraduate students. It is located on the east side of campus and each unit includes a living room, two bedrooms, a backyard, and many other features not common to other on-campus housing. These units are application-based and are usually occupied by sophomores, juniors and seniors. The third floor of Grace Hall has been converted to graduate student housing.

== Student body ==
Demographics of undergraduate student body (2011)
	Student Body	California	U.S. Census
African American	3.6%	6.2%	12.1%
Asian American	5.5%	13.0%	3.6%
White American	60.8%	40.1%	69.1%
Hispanic American	16.4%	37.6%	16.3%
Native American	0.9%	1.0%	0.7%
International student	6.7%	N/A	N/A

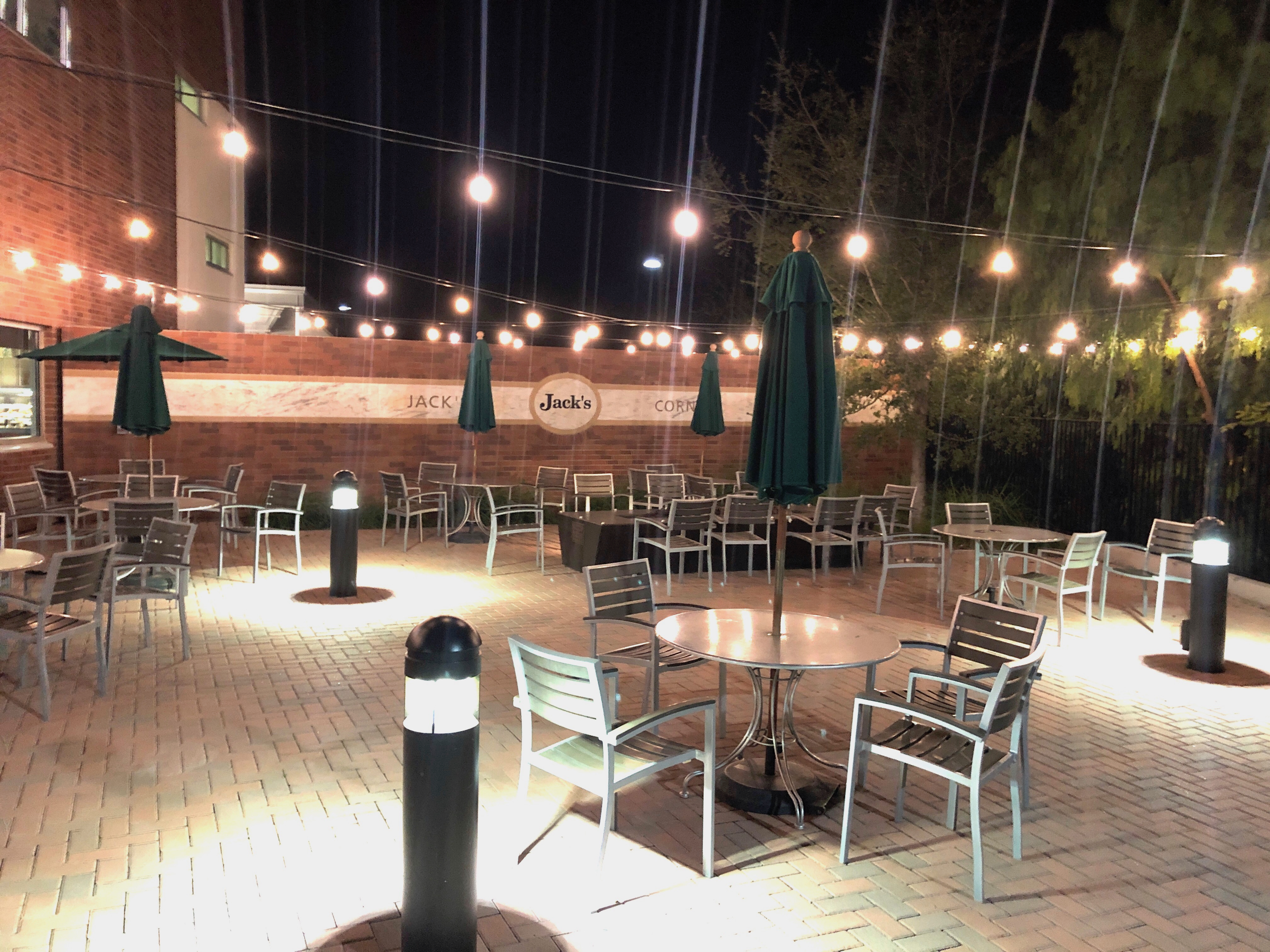
Jack's Corner by Ullman Commons

The CLU student body consists of approximately 3,499 students as of 2009, originating from 43 U.S. states and U.S. territories, and 47 countries. 80 percent were from California, and 56 percent of students were female. In 2018, 54 percent of incoming freshman students were from Ventura and Los Angeles counties.

As of 2011, 60% the student body were Caucasian-American, 16.4% Hispanic-American, 5.5% Asian-American, 3.6% African-American, and 0.9% Native-American. 62% of students were female, while 38% were male. 6.7 percent of the student body were international students. There were 90 international undergraduate students representing 20 countries as of 2010. From 2008 to 2016, the percentage of Hispanic undergraduate students increased from 14% to 29%.

The average class size is 16 students. The university has 75 registered organizations, 11 honor societies, and 3 religious organizations. Student clubs include Asian Club and Friends, Brothers & Sisters United, Latin American Student Organization, United Students of the World, Chinese Students Association, among others.

Cal Lutheran had 150 Jewish students as of 2016. A Rabbi is a member of the campus ministry and participates in weekly chapel services. The Hillel Club is an on-campus organization for Jewish students advised by campus Rabbi Belle Michael. The club is run by a team of students with support from the university's Hillel Advisory Board, made up of community leaders, alumni, faculty, staff and parents.

It is located in an area with a conservative political nature. A large number of students have organized a Republican Club which has gained national prominence by having "the highest ratio of club members to number of students of any College Republican club in California." Some of their 1997 missions included adding an American flag to every classroom and having Christian prayers at student senate meetings. CLU's College Republicans doubled its membership in the fall of 2008.

The freshman retention rate was 80% as of 2011. 65 percent of graduates go on to further study within 1 year of graduation. 78 percent of freshmen return for sophomore year.

=== Admission ===
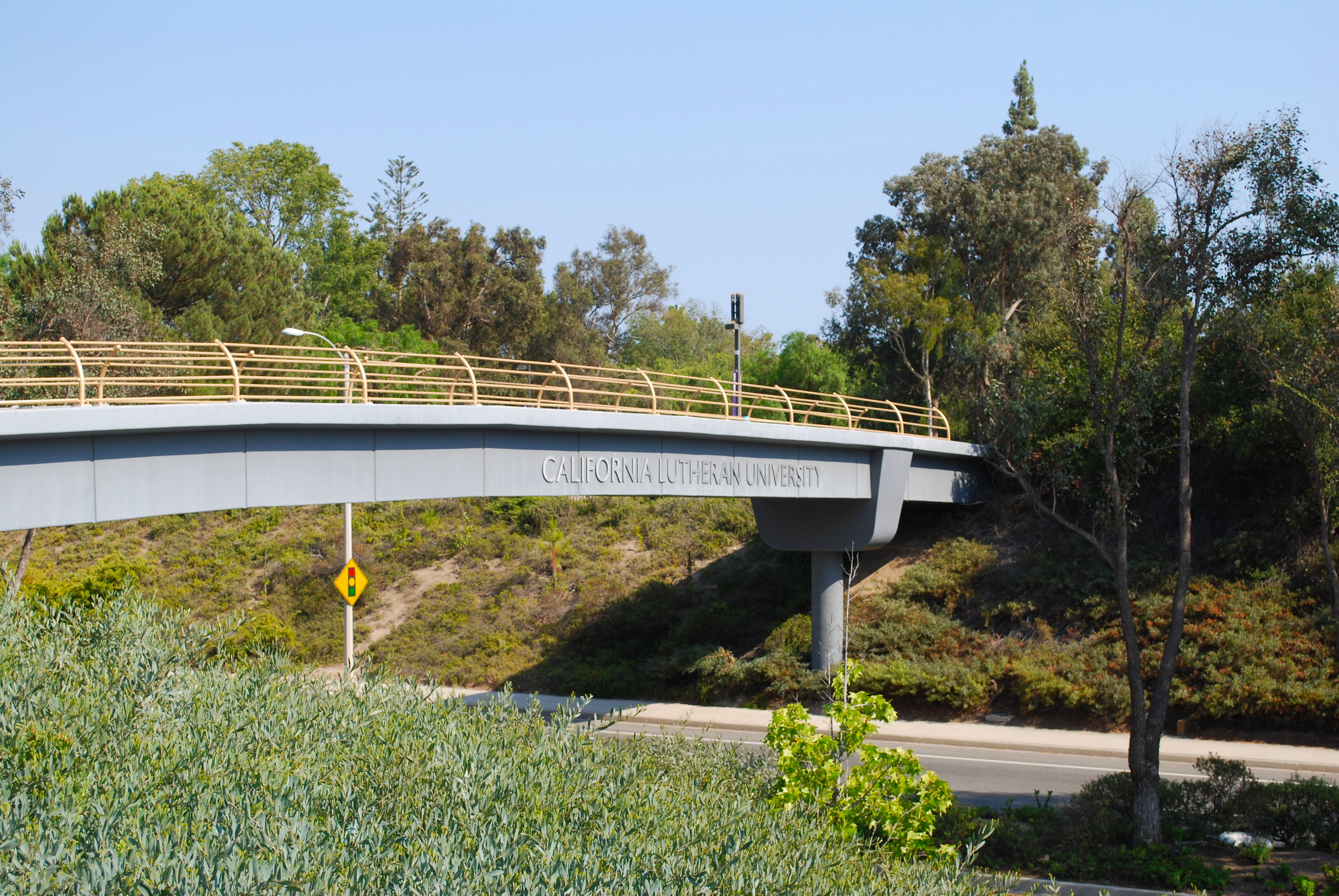
Luedtke Bridge, pedestrian bridge over Olsen Road

The university has an admission rate of 62 percent (2010). Enrolled students had an SAT Critical Reading range of 490–580, SAT Math range of 510–610, and a SAT Writing range of 490–590. The average high school GPA was 3.8. For admission, the university requires an interview, essay, previous school transcripts, GPA and SAT or ACT scores, as well as TOEFL scores for international students. The university assesses its own entrance difficulty level as moderately difficult.

=== ASCLU-G Student Government ===
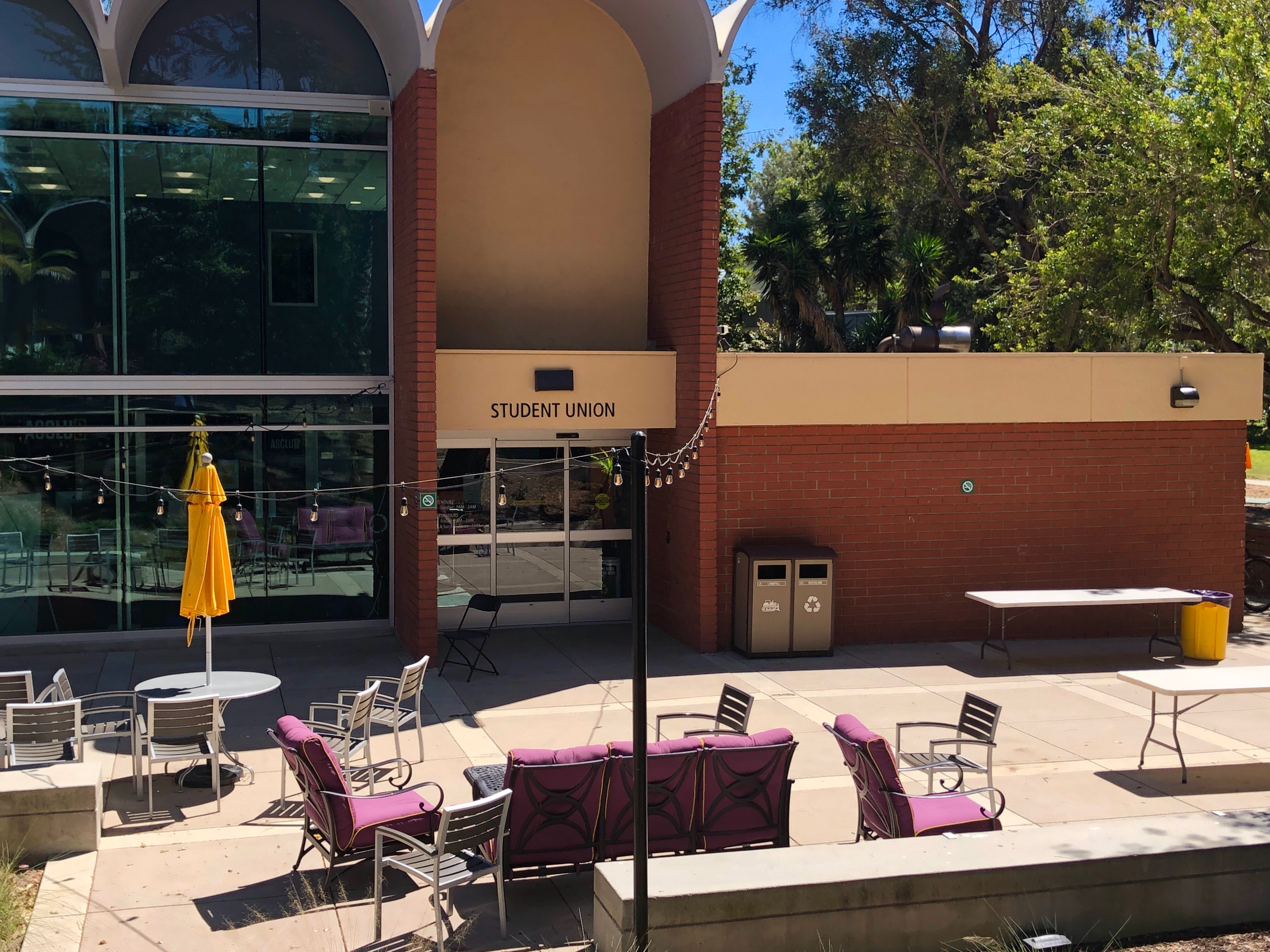
Student Union Building

As of the 2009–2010 academic year, the student government of California Lutheran University is divided into three branches, each possessing different responsibilities. The ASCLU-G (Associated Students of California Lutheran University Government) comprises the Senate, Programs Board, and Executive Cabinet. For Senate and Programs Board, there are four elected positions available per class level as well as a transfer student, recorder, and commuter student position. The Executive Cabinet is made up largely of students who have served on ASCLU-G for one or more years and contains the offices of the ASCLU President, Programs Board Director, Senate Director, Executive Recorder, and ASCLU Controller. Meetings are held Monday nights, and the entire student body is welcome to attend. Elections are held in the spring semester for all positions for the next academic year and in the fall semester to elect the four freshmen positions and any unfilled spots from the spring election.

==== Senate ====
The ASCLU Senate is primarily responsible for the financial needs of the students. Some of their duties include (but are not limited to): approving and allocating funds to new campus clubs, purchasing equipment for residence halls, and discussing and/or changing campus dining policies. The Senate is usually divided into three or four committees, headed by a committee chair (who has usually served on Senate for one or more years), and each has a specific jurisdiction regarding campus policies.

==== Programs Board ====
The ASCLU-G Programs Board is primarily responsible for planning, organizing, financing, and running many of the on- and off-campus events that go on throughout each academic year. The principal event that Programs Board is responsible for is known as "Club Lu", a free event for traditional undergraduate students every Friday night. Each Club Lu event is different; previous events include rollerskating, on-campus dances, ice skating, bowling, movie nights, the Homecoming carnival, Christmas festivals, and talent shows. Programs Board is also responsible for planning larger off-campus events such as the Homecoming Dance and Spring Formal. Like Senate, Programs Board is divided into three or four committees, each headed by a committee chair (who has usually served on Programs Board for one or more years), and each is assigned specific events to plan throughout the academic year.

== Norwegian roots ==
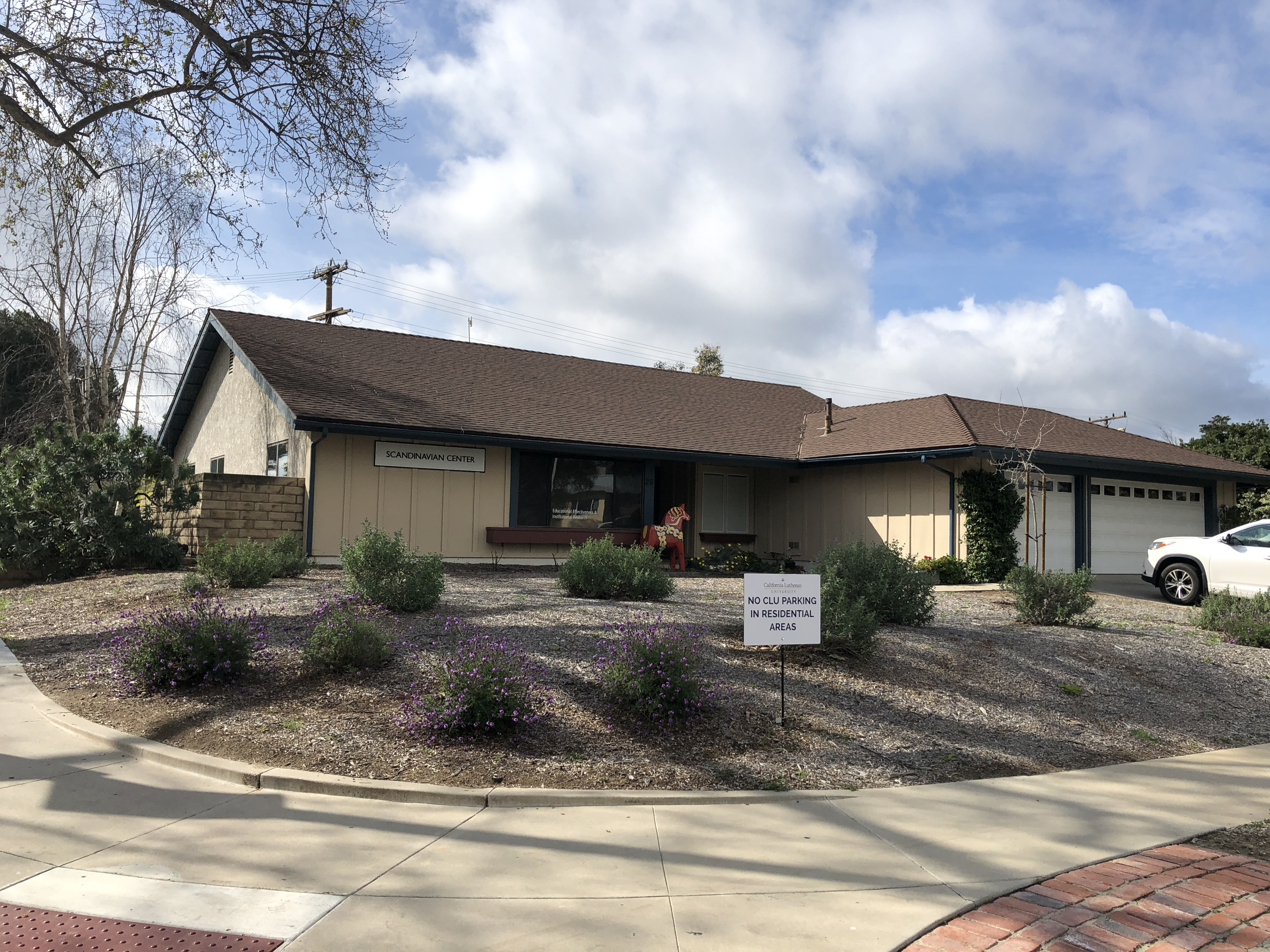
The Scandinavian Center has a large, wooden Dala horse on its front lawn.

California Lutheran University is located on land which was donated by the Pedersons from the Norwegian Colony. The road which it is located on, Olsen Road, is named for Norwegian pioneer Nils Olsen of the Norwegian Colony. The nearby 7-acre Spring Meadow Park, which is located on Olsen Road east of CLU, is dedicated to the early Norwegians who settled the area.

The university's ties to Norway remain strong. In 2017, twenty percent of the international undergraduate students were from Norway. CLU gave $15,000 in scholarships to its Norwegian students in 2014. As of 2015, the university gave $18,000 in scholarships to its forty Norwegian students. CLU is among the most popular U.S. universities for Norwegian undergraduate students. CLU is a partnership school with the Norway-America Association.

The Scandinavian influence can continue to be seen in the spring Scandinavian Cultural Festival and in the names of buildings on campus and local streets, many named for prominent Norwegians who helped establish CLU. An example is Lars Pederson's original home which has been relocated to Faculty Street on campus. It is known as Pederson House and Water Tower and is designated Ventura County Historic Landmark number 45 and Thousand Oaks Historical Landmark number 3. A bronze statue of Richard Pederson was dedicated on April 18, 2015, next to the flagpoles near the Soiland Humanities Center. Nearby Pederson Road is also named for the Pederson family.

=== Scandinavian Festival ===
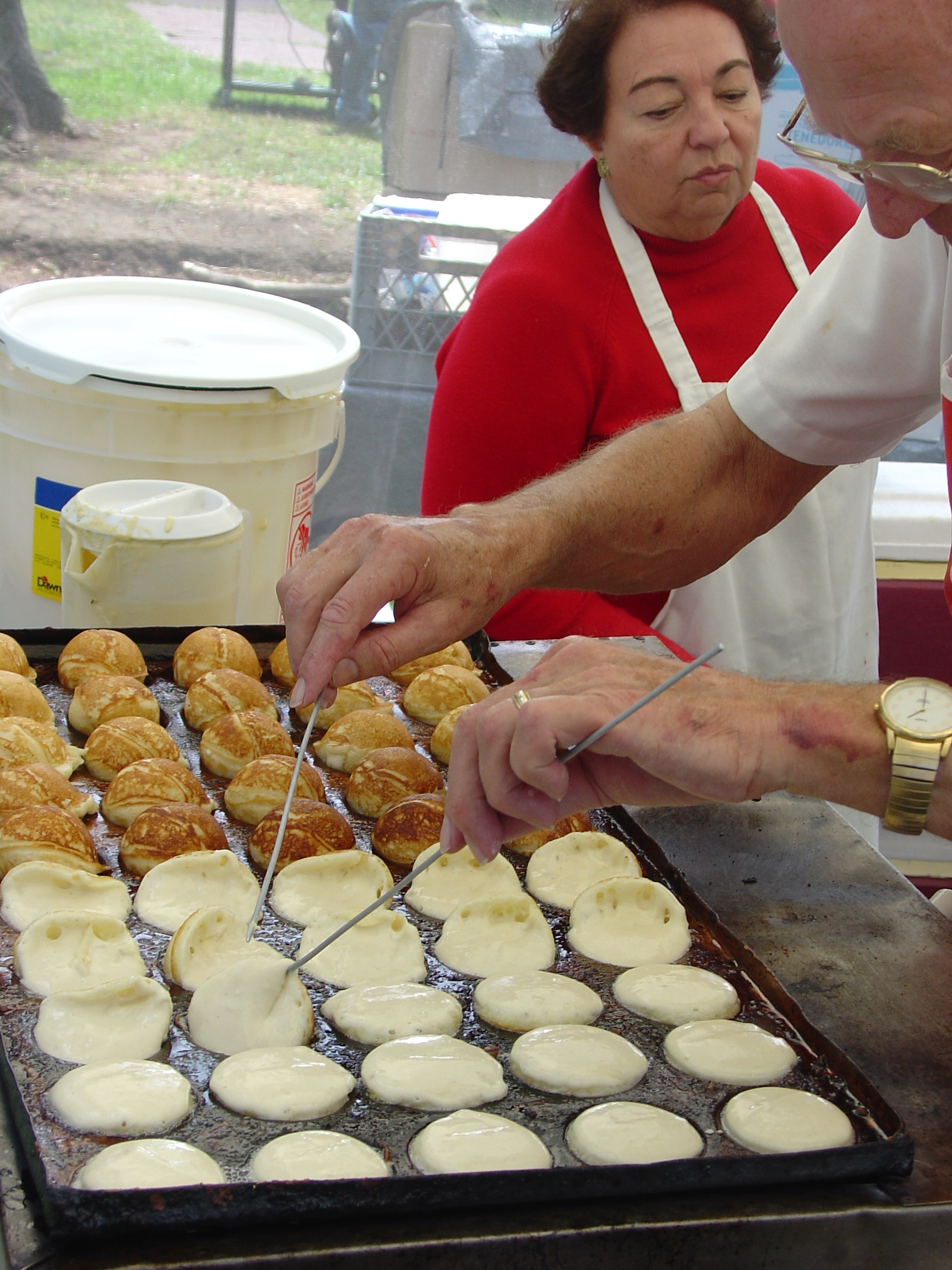
Aebleskiver at the annual Scandinavian Festival

The Scandinavian Festival (“Scan Fest”) is an annual weekend spring festival which takes place at the university campus. Founded by Swedish-American professor Armour Nelson and Norwegian-American John Nordberg, the festival began as a celebration of the history of the college and the surrounding area, which was settled by Norwegians in the 1890s. The first festival was held in 1974 and attracted 600 visitors. Consuls from Norway, Sweden, Denmark, Iceland, and Finland also participated. While the first Scandinavian Festival took place in the college gymnasium, the festival is currently held across the university campus. The festival stage and children's craft activities are located in Kingsmen Park, vendor booths can be found along Memorial Parkway, and exhibits and specialty programs often take place in Samuelson Chapel. The event celebrates the cultures of the Nordic countries – Norway, Sweden, Denmark, Iceland, Finland, as well as the Arctic's indigenous Sami people of northernmost Scandinavia. The festival features folk dancing, traditional music, lectures, local cuisine, vendors, demonstrations, and more. Previous festivals have included puppet shows of Hans Christian Andersen stories, authentic Viking village replicas, Dala horse croquet, the ancient Viking game kubb, and more. Food served often includes Danish aebleskiver, Norwegian lefse, Swedish pancakes, Swedish meatballs, open-faced sandwiches as well as Scandinavian snacks, pastries, and ice cream. Vendors on site sell various authentic and traditional Scandinavian merchandise. The festival has received much assistance from the Sons of Norway, the Vasa Lodge, and the CLC Women's League and the Guild. The Ingeborg Estergren Scholarship has also been awarded at the event.

The festival is produced by the Scandinavian American Cultural and Historical Foundation with support from California Lutheran University. Scandinavian American Cultural and Historical Foundation is located in a house on Faculty Street. The Scandinavian Cultural Center houses Scandinavian artifacts, literature, and oral history recorded on tapes.

== Student research and publications ==
CLU houses two annual undergraduate research events: the Festival of Scholars and the Student Research Symposium. The Festival of Scholars is a week-long presentation of scholarly work, presented by the undergraduate and graduate students from the College of Arts and Sciences, the Graduate School of Education and the School of Management. Student researchers participate in oral presentations, art exhibitions, panel discussions, teaching demonstrations, poster sessions, multimedia displays, and recitals.

=== University Press ===
California Lutheran College University Press has published books such as California Lutheran College: The First Quarter Century (1984), The Temescals of Arroyo Conejo (1982), Voyages (1977), Gaylerd Falde: A Bishop For His Time (1993), Hiking In Wildwood Regional Park: Natural History, Folklore, and Trail Guide (2000), The Art Of TRAC2015 (2015), and several books by Barbara J. Collins.

== Athletics ==
Sports at Cal Lutheran
Men's	Women's
Baseball; Basketball; Cross country; Football; Golf; Soccer; Swimming & Diving; Tennis; Track & field; Volleyball; Water polo	Basketball; Cross country; Golf; Lacrosse; Soccer; Softball; Swimming & Diving; Tennis; Track & field; Volleyball; Water polo

The California Lutheran (Cal Lutheran) athletic teams are called the Kingsmen and Regals. The university is a member of the Division III level of the National Collegiate Athletic Association (NCAA), primarily competing in the Southern California Intercollegiate Athletic Conference (SCIAC) since the 1991–92 academic year. The Kingsmen and Regals previously competed in the Golden State Athletic Conference (GSAC) of the National Association of Intercollegiate Athletics (NAIA) 1986–87 to 1988–89; and as an NAIA Independent from 1989–90 to 1990–91.

Cal Lutheran competes in 22 NCAA-sanctioned intercollegiate varsity sports: Men's sports (Kingsmen) include baseball, basketball, cross country, golf, football, soccer, swimming & diving, tennis, track & field, volleyball and water polo; while women's teams (Regals) include basketball, cross country, golf, lacrosse, soccer, softball, swimming & diving, tennis, track and field, volleyball and water polo.

=== Club sports and intramurals ===
Rugby, ice hockey, handball, and frisbee are offered as club sports, while intramural sports include dodgeball, flag football, bowling, softball, and more.

=== Accomplishments ===
From 1991 to 2002, the university won 26 SCIAC championships, averaging more than five per season. As of 2019, CLU has won 55 league championships. Twenty-five percent of students participate in the university's intercollegiate sports. As a Division III member, the university does not offer athletic scholarships.

=== Kingsmen football ===
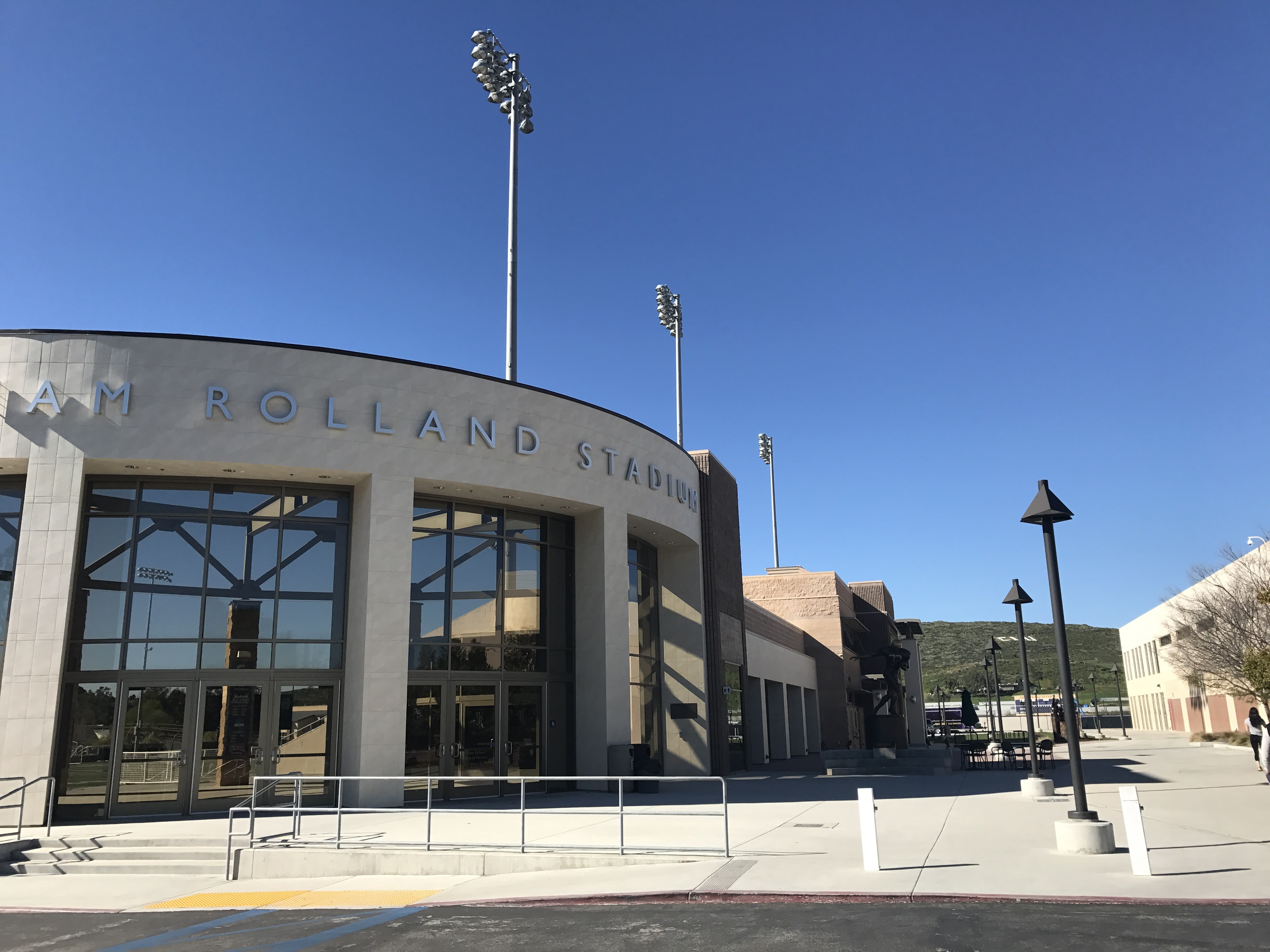
The Los Angeles Rams use CLU for training in 2016–19.

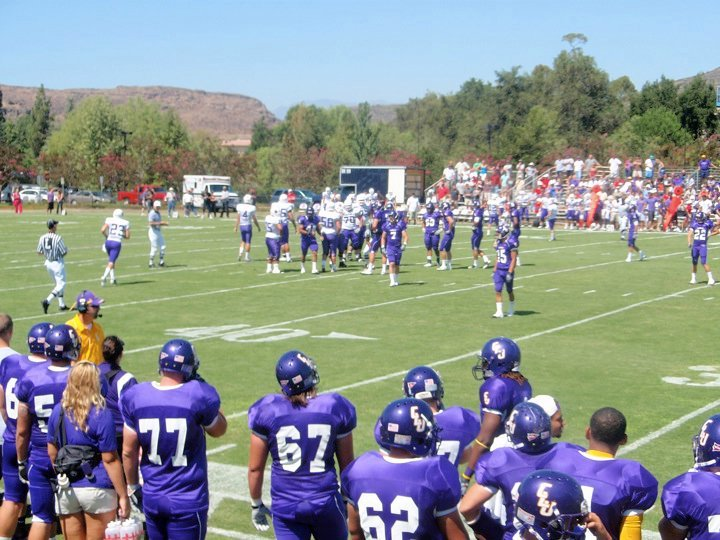
Kingsmen at the Memorial Field (formerly Mt Clef Field), 2010

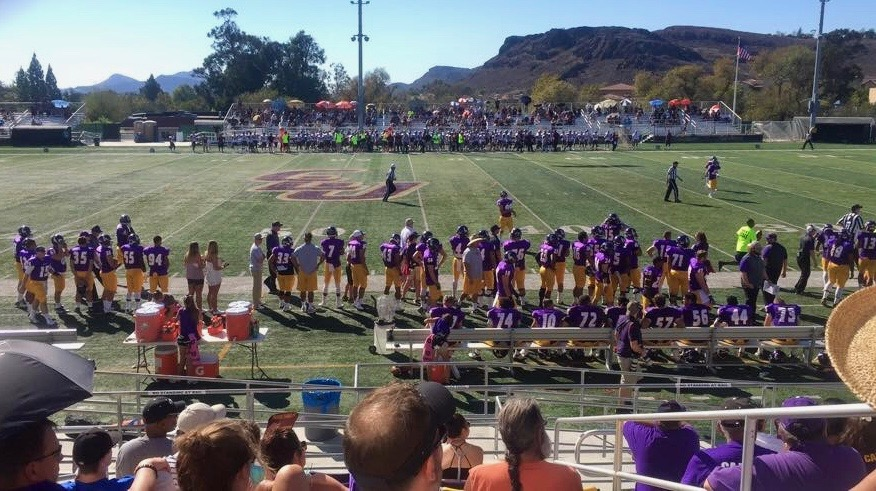
Kingsmen football team, 2015

The football team won the NAIA National Championship in 1971, its only national championship to date. Head coach Robert Shoup was named NAIA Coach of the Year that season. He led the Kingsmen to 13 NAIA District 3 Championships and the 5 playoffs in his 17 years as coach. The current head coach is Anthony Lugo.

CLU joined the NCAA in 1991 and began playing at the Division II level as a member of the Western Football Conference. As a SCIAC member, the Kingsmen won the conference championship in 2007, 2009, 2010, 2011, and 2012. Running back Brian Stuart received the Player of the Year award in 2009. The team has a SCIAC rivalry with the Redlands Bulldogs where the teams battle each other annually for the trophy known as the Smudge Pot, a perpetual trophy introduced to the rivalry in 2012.

Notable players have included Brian Kelley and Sam Cvijanovich, who were drafted after the 1971 NAIA Championship win. Other notable players include Hank Bauer, who retired from the San Diego Chargers in 1982, and Jerry Palmquist who played for the Denver Broncos. Gary Loyd was drafted by the New Orleans Saints, William “Robbie” Robinson by the Pittsburgh Steelers, Gary Hamm by the Toronto Argonauts, Charlie McShane by the Seattle Seahawks, and Russ Jensen by the Los Angeles Express. Other notable football players and coaches of CLU include Tom Herman, Rod Marinelli, Eric Rogers, Cory Undlin, Phil Frye, and Dave Aranda. Ralph Miller became a founding member of the National Football League Players Association and has played for the New Orleans Saints, Houston Oilers, Philadelphia Eagles, San Diego Chargers, New York Giants, and San Francisco 49ers.

==== History ====
Luther Schwich made plans to establish the school's first football team in 1962. This was also the same year the sports’ moniker Kingsmen was chosen, which was a compromise between those favoring "Condors" and "Shepherds". Schwich selected Shoup to start the team, a recruiter who had garnered fame at University of California, Santa Barbara, in the mid-1950s. Shoup had also compiled an impressive record at North High School in Torrance prior to his career at CLU. His first assignment was to create a team and recruit players, as well as developing a schedule and securing facilities. The home games were first played at Camarillo High School field. Their first win soon followed, 20–12 over Los Angeles-Pacific. After having played at Thousand Oaks High School for a limited time, Kingsmen football was playing at their own Mount Clef field starting in 1963, a football field on campus which had been readied for the Dallas Cowboys' summer camp. The first game took place in 1964 against University of La Verne where the Kingsmen jumped to a 13–8 victory.

A winning streak began in 1965 and lasted for several years, bringing in an 8–1 record in 1965 ("Year of the Champions"), 8–2 in 1966 ("Year of the Victors"), and 7–2 in 1967 ("Year of the Conquerors"). In 1968, punter Gary Loyd was named an NAIA All-America and the college appeared for the first time in the national rankings, coming in 9th. Robbie Robinson's seventeen field goals in 1969 ("Year of the Warriors") set an NAIA record and the team moved up to 7th place. From its 8–1 record in 1970, the team moved into its greatest season to date in 1971, and captured the NAIA Division II National Championship, winning against Montana Tech and Westminster College in the playoffs. A college celebration was staged in conjunction with the Dallas Cowboys that won Super Bowl VI of January 1972. Shoup was named NAIA Coach of the Year and also Lutheran Coach of the Year. Following the championship, numerous players were drafted by professional teams, including Brian Kelley by the New York Giants and Sam Cvijanovich who played in the Canadian Football League. Another key performer in the championship game was Mike Sheppard, who later became a professional player at various NFL teams and head coach at California State University Long Beach. Successful years followed the championship, and the team soon appeared three times in the NAIA playoffs: in 1975, 1977 and 1982. As of 1984, Kingsmen football was among the top small college teams in the U.S.

==== Cradle of Coaches ====
Cal Lutheran has been called the West Coast's “Cradle of Coaches”; nearly 1 in 4 of football coach Bob Shoup’s players would go on to coach at some level. 144 players have become football coaches, and several have been drafted to the NFL.

List of notable coaches:

- Dave Aranda
- Hank Bauer
- Sam Cvijanovich
- Phil Frye
- Joe Fuca
- Steve Hagen
- Tom Herman
- Danny Langsdorf
- Rod Marinelli
- Ben McEnroe
- Mike Sheppard
- Cory Undlin
- Bryan Wagner
- Russ Jensen
- Mike Haluchak

=== Kingsmen baseball ===
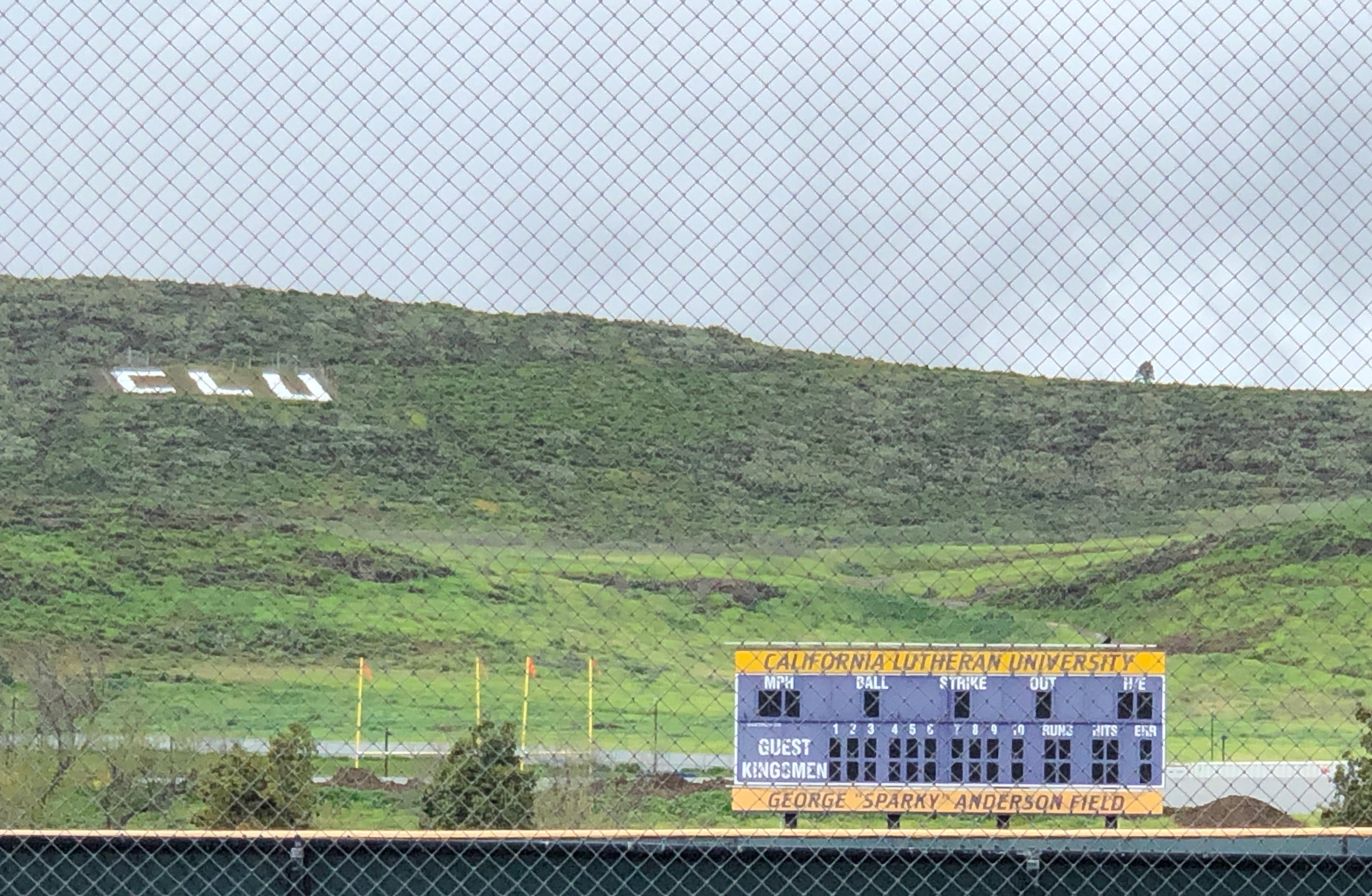
George Sparky Anderson Field.

On May 30, 2017, the Kingsmen won their first NCAA Division III baseball title under coach Marty Slimak. Cal Lutheran defeated Washington & Jefferson College 12–4 and 7–3 in the final two games of a best-of-three series, marking the team's sixth appearance in the championship round. Slimak has been the head coach since 1994 and is the winningest coach in CLU's history. The team has earned seven Southern California Intercollegiate Athletic Conference (SCIAC) titles during his tenure and has never placed lower than fourth in the league standings. The team has recorded over twenty wins all but one time and has not had a single losing season during Marty Slimak's tenure. He has guided three of his teams to the Division III College World Series where they were the runner-up in 1996 and third-place finishers in 1999. The Kingsmen have played in three West Regionals. Eleven players have been drafted by Major League Baseball (MLB) organizations during Slimak's tenure. Besides the NCAA Division III national championship, Slimak has guided CLU to twelve conference championships, thirteen regional appearances and four World Series appearances. He was selected as the American Baseball Coaches Association/Diamond National Division III Coach of the Year in 2017. As of 2014, 24 players have been drafted for MLB organizations.

Baseball Hall of Famer Sparky Anderson helped raise money for the baseball team. Anderson, the first manager to win World Series championships in both the American and National Leagues, was approached by the team's coach in 1979 and came up with the idea of golf tournaments to raise money for scholarships. Anderson visited the campus regularly and the university baseball team plays their home games at George Lee "Sparky" Anderson Field, named in honor of the MLB coach. The university was a five-minute walk from Anderson's residence in Thousand Oaks. After his retirement, he became a frequent visitor to CLU games.

Anderson has also used his influence to attract top names in the sport to the team. Several CLU players have been drafted for professional teams, including Kevin Gross who was drafted by the Philadelphia Phillis in 1983. Jason Hirsh was drafted by the Houston Astros in the second round of the 2003 Major League Baseball draft. MLB baseball player Ron Stillwell was the baseball coach from 1972 to 1978, and had a record of 139–100–1 (.581) and was named "NAIA Coach of the Year" in 1976. Rich Hill was the head coach from 1983 to 1985, and Lindsay Meggs was the assistant baseball coach in 1988–89.

The Kingsmen baseball team has played international games, including in Panama City, Panama and San Jose, Costa Rica. A local baseball team, Conejo Oaks, which competes in the California Collegiate League (CCL), play their home games at the university's Ullman Stadium (George Lee "Sparky" Anderson Field).

=== Regals volleyball ===
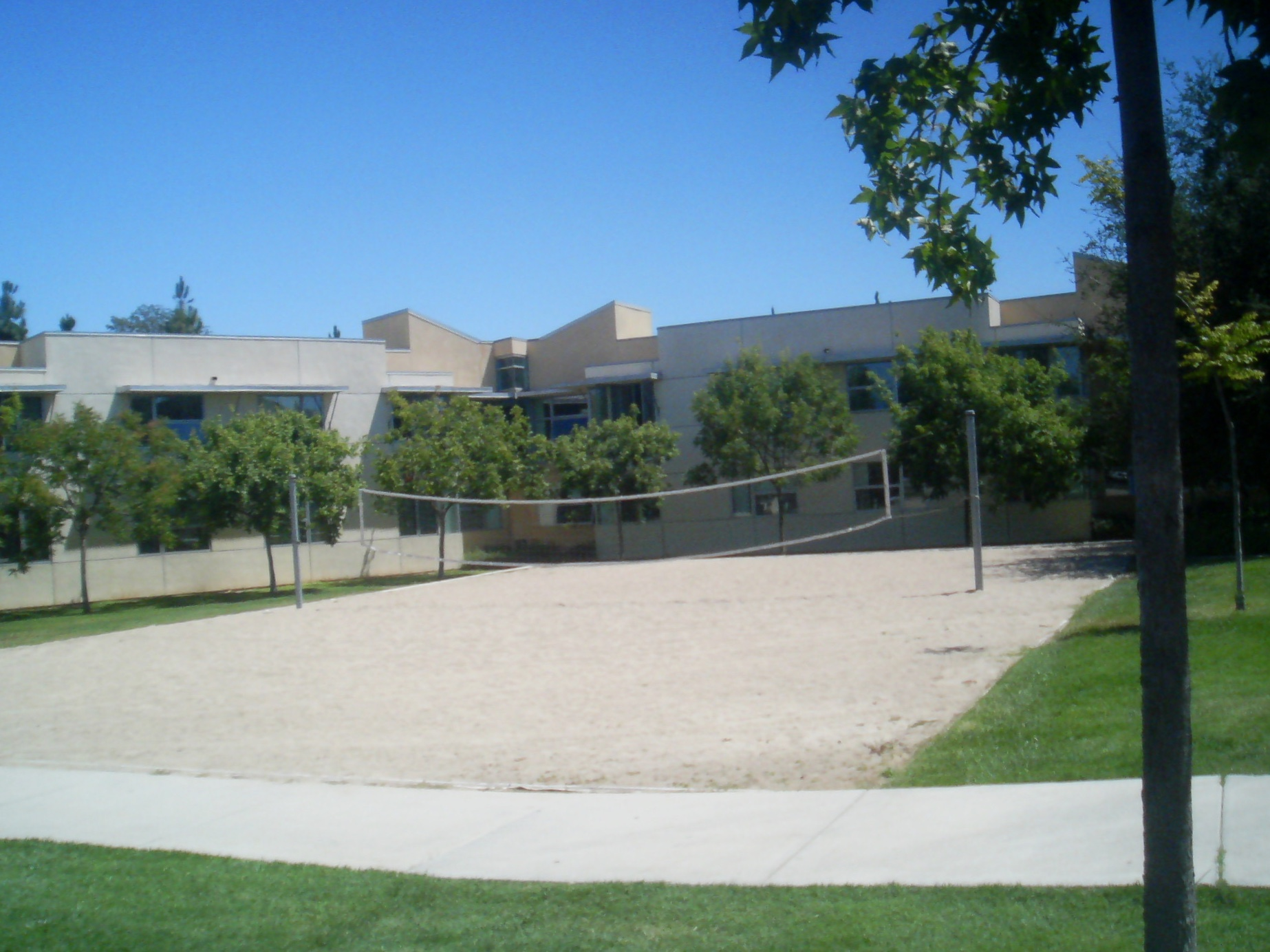
Community volleyball field

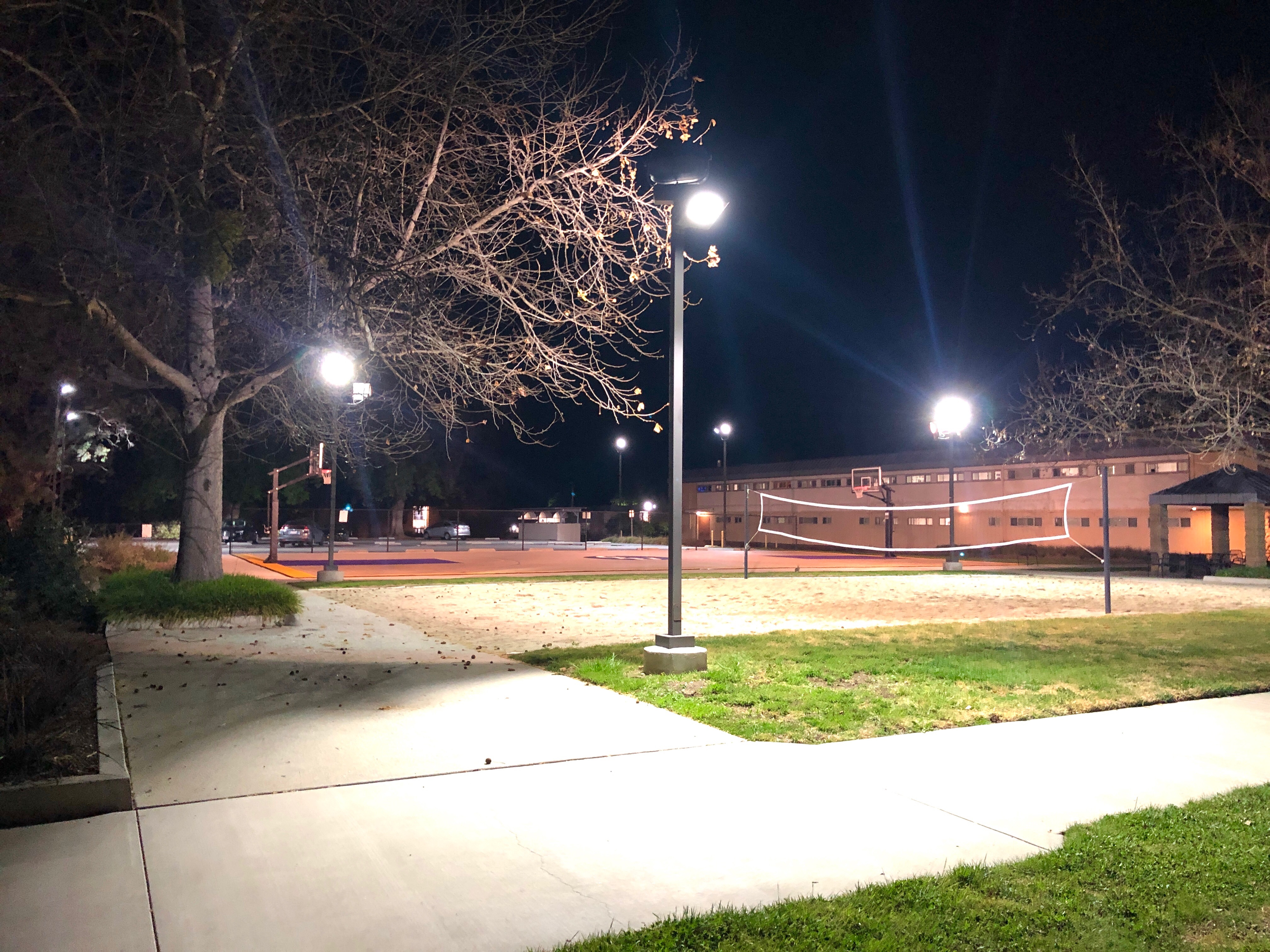
Thompson Pederson Recreation Area

In 2015, Regals volleyball won the national championship in NCAA Division III women's volleyball, defeating Wittenberg University 3–0 on November 21 in the team's third appearance in the final round. They were led by head coach Kellee Roesel. In 2016 the team made their ninth straight appearance in the NCAA Tournament and the 17th in school history. The team was ranked number two in the nation as of 2016.

The women's volleyball team has for decades periodically been the strongest competitive women's sport at CLU. Already in the early 1960s, the team played schools such as UC Santa Barbara, Westmont College and Cal State-Northridge. Handling most of the coaching for women until 1970 was Nena Amundson, who joined the faculty in 1961, hired by Orville Dahl to organize the women's athletic programs. California Lutheran College (CLC) joined the Association of Intercollegiate Athletics for Women (AIAW) when formed in 1971, and was a member until 1982 when women joined the men in the NAIA. In 1970, the female athletes adopted the name Regals for all women's sports. The team was the runner-up for the 1995 NCAA Division III women's volleyball tournament.

Notable players include Joyce Parkel, who was the captain of the volleyball team when it became a runner-up in Southern California in the late 1960s. Olympic Gold Medal swimmer Patty Kempner was the team captain when they qualified for the AIAW Regionals in 1976. The coach while Kempner played was Diana Hoffman, a volleyball player who played on six national volleyball teams and was a member of the 1964 and 1968 U.S. Olympic teams. Guiding the team from last in the league to an AIAW qualifier in two years, Hoffman is recognized for having laid the foundation for continued success for the Regals volleyball team.

=== Kingsmen basketball ===
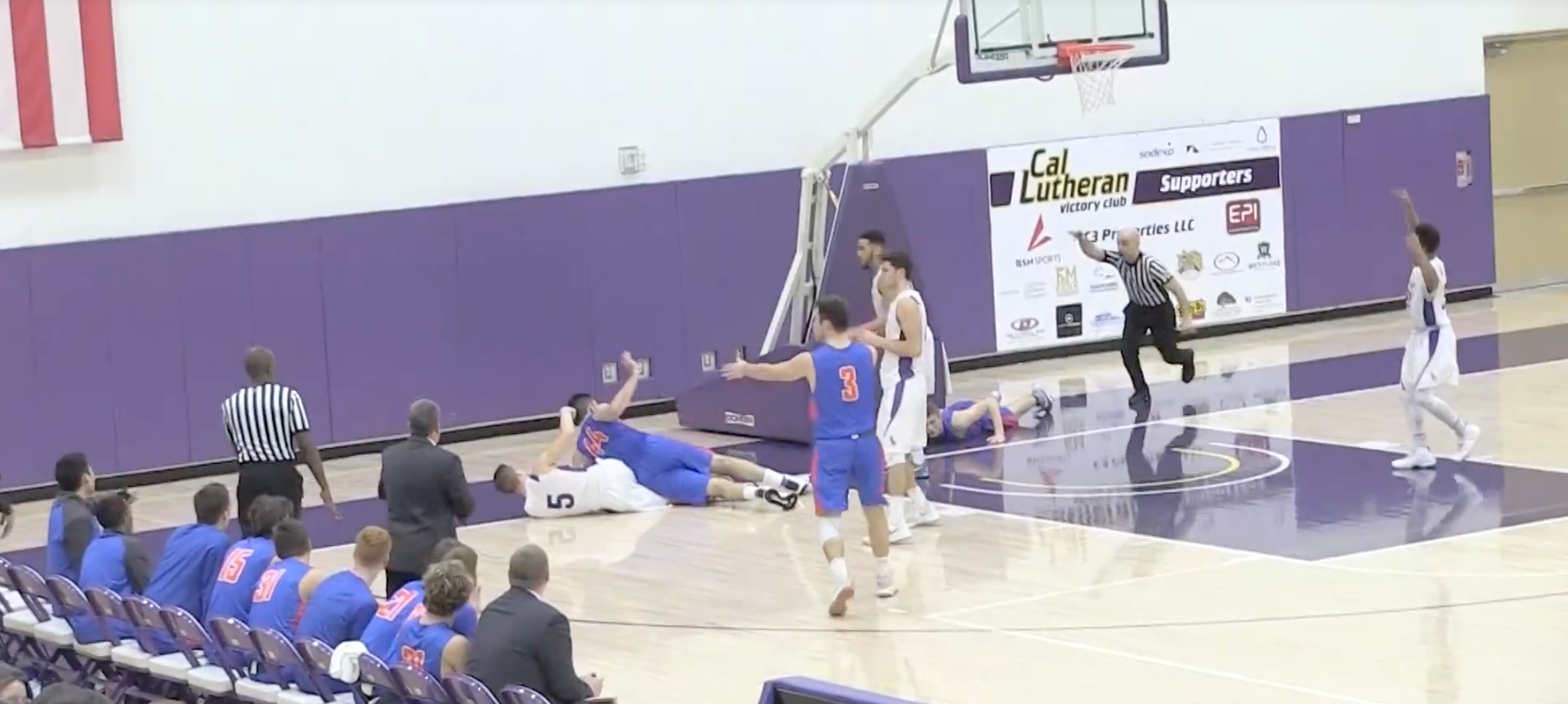
Cal Lutheran Kingsmen vs Pomona-Pitzer Sagehens, 2017.

Luther Schwich coached the CLC basketball team from 1961 to 1963 before John R. Siemens of Westmont College became the college basketball coach and also assumed the role of athletic director upon Schwich's resignation. Don Bielke, a former professional NBA player from the San Francisco Bay Area and a standout at Valparaiso, joined the staff as an instructor and coach in the 1970s. Two winning years are attributed to him: the 1977–78 and 1979–80 seasons. CLC hired Ed Anderson in 1983, a coach from Pacific Lutheran University. Mike Dunlap was the head coach from 1989 to 1994 and guided the Kingsmen to an 80–55 record. Notable CLU players include Derrick Clark, Tim LaKose, and Jason Smith.

Tim Fusina, former head coach at Centenary University in Hackettstown, New Jersey, became head coach for the team in 2017. Fusina took over after Geoff Dains, who was named interim head coach after the resignation of Rich Rider, the winningest basketball coach in CLU history. Rider had a record of 345–207 in 22 seasons at Cal Lutheran. In the 2016 season, the Kingsmen basketball team went 20–7 past season and placed second in the Southern California Intercollegiate Athletic Conference with a 12–4 record, advancing to the Postseason Tournament for the seventh time.

The Los Angeles Lightning is a professional basketball team based at the Gilbert Sports Arena.

=== Kingsmen wrestling ===
In the mid-1960s, the college became known throughout the NAIA District III as a wrestling power. Coach Don Garrison had a group of nineteen wrestlers who in 1969 won 12 and lost 3 matches and thereby capturing the NAIA District III championship. Upon Garrison's resignation, the team began losing more than it won, the sport subsided and funding became uncertain. Former Olympic wrestler Buck Deadrich took over as coach in 1975 and the team consequentially began to move upwards again. Deadrich, who also served as the Sports Information Director, began recruiting wrestlers to the college. During his tenure, several of the CLC wrestlers competed in national events. Ed Fleming won silver in the Pan American Games in 1980. Kim Coddington won 16 of 20 matches in 1977 and qualified for the national champion. Upon Deadrich’ resignation, the wrestling program struggled for about two years before being eliminated as a competitive sport. Football player Brian Kelley was named the NAIA District III heavyweight wrestling champion in 1970.

=== Kingsmen track and field ===
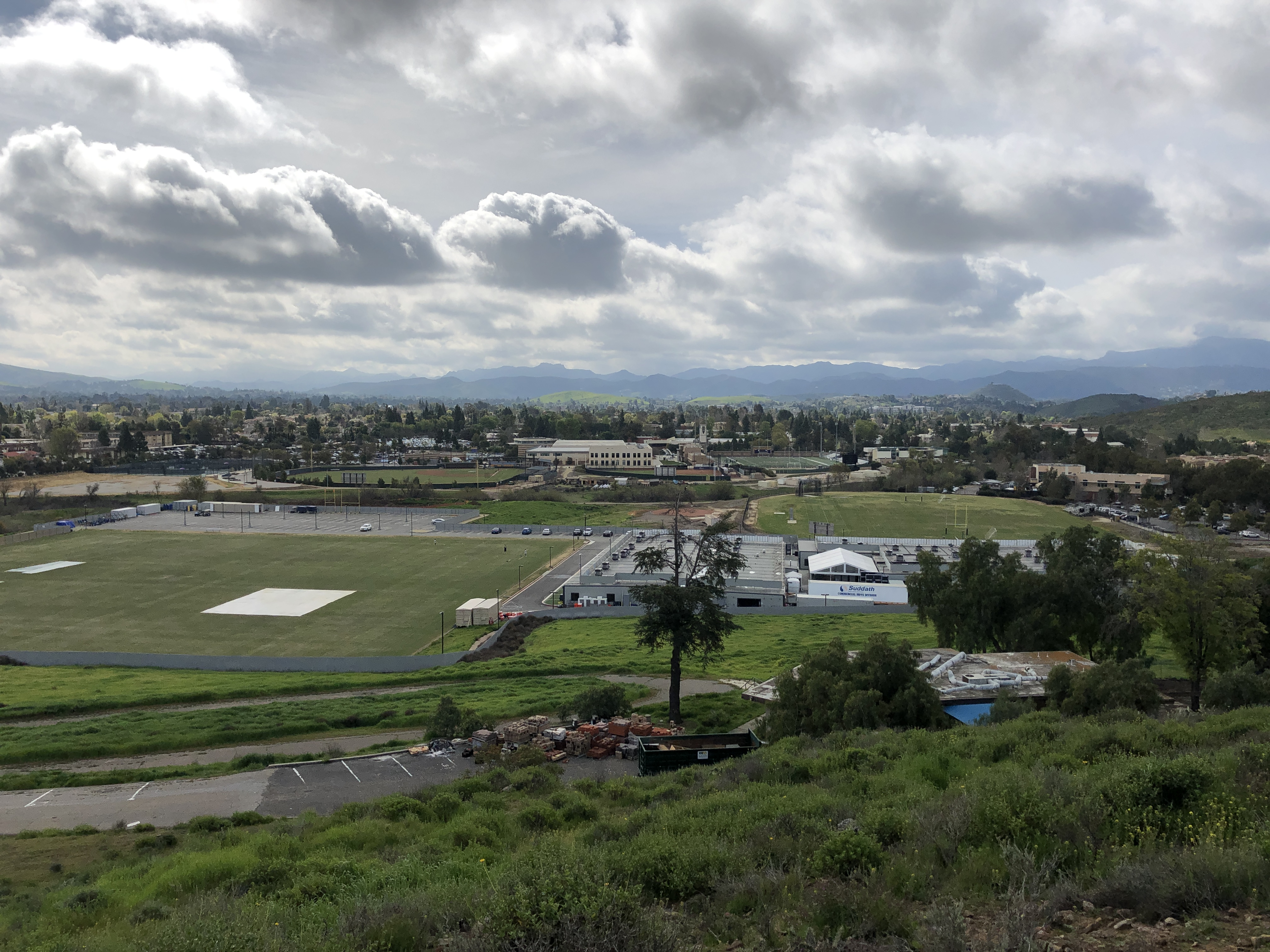
The athletics facilities

Under the coaching of Don Green, men's track and field remained a perennial winner in the NAIA. A former coach at Pomona High School, Don Green joined CLC staff in 1970 as both a track coach and defensive football coach. In 1981, the team won the NAIA District III championship, and the track runners annually competed in nationwide events. 1984 was one of the college's best years in the national championship: Matt Carney finished sixth in the decathlon and earned an All American honor with 6,269 points. In sprint relays, the team finished in sixth place with a time of 42,2 fielding a team of Ken Coakley, Roger Nelson, Maurice Hamilton and Troy Kuretich all earning All American honors. Green coached 44 All-Americans during his 21 years as coach of the track and field team. He has been inducted into the Mt. San Antonio Relays and Southern Section halls of fame. Besides a coach, he was also the college athletic director for five years in the 1970s. He retired in 1991.

Under the guidance of three different head coaches from 2000 to 2010, Kingsmen track and field has sent multiple representatives to compete at the NCAA national championships. Over that decade, five athletes have earned individual SCIAC titles and sixteen have made All-SCIAC with a top-six finish at conference finals.

=== Other sports ===
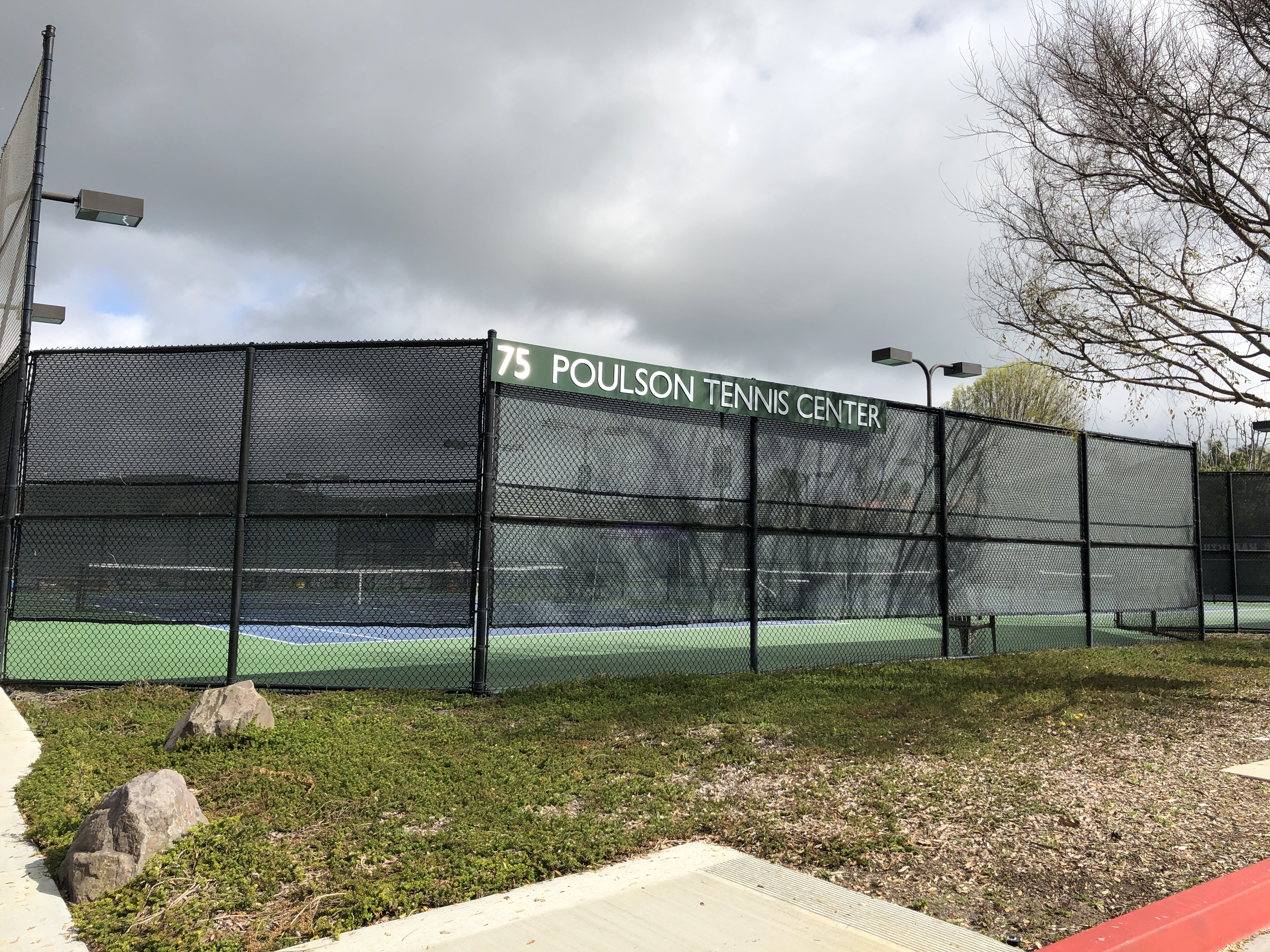
Poulson Tennis Center

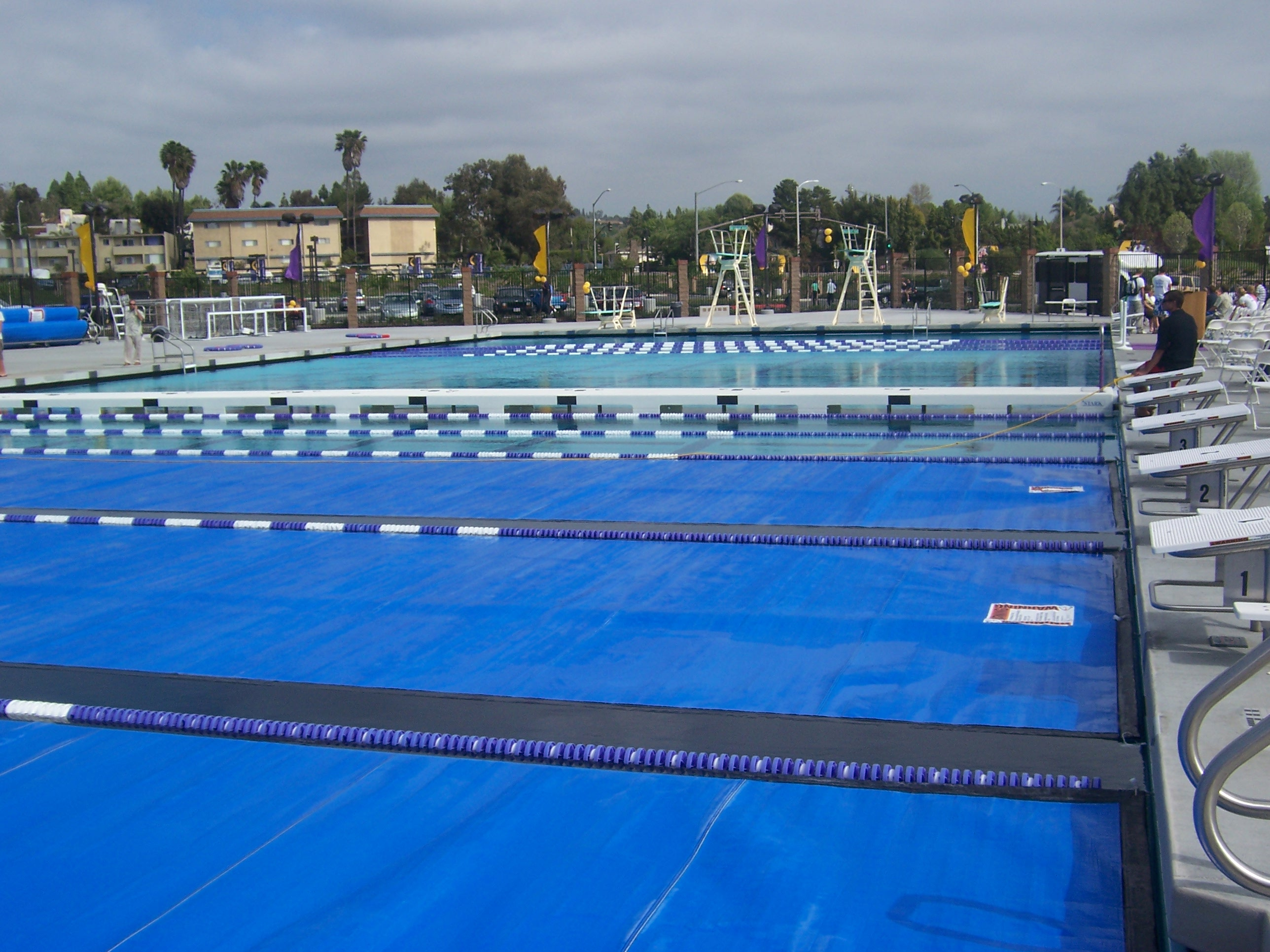
Samuelson Aquatics Center served as a training site of the 2008 and 2012 US Olympic Men's Water Polo teams.

The men's volleyball team experienced one of its best years in 1978 when it recorded a 15–3 season and entered the NAIA national playoffs, where the team captured fourth place in the nation under Coach Bob Ward and his assistant Don Hyatt. In men's tennis, Coach John Siemens Jr. helped the team achieve a number two ranking in the NAIA District III race, the highest tennis achievements for the college. One of the best seasons for the men's golf team was in the 1982–83 season when CLC finished seventeenth in the national competition in Texas. During the next season, Coach Bob Shoup was able to send Greg Osbourne to compete in the national competition in Michigan, where he ultimately finished fourth. Osbourne captured the NAIA District III individual championship in 1984 and picked up All-America honors, and raised the bar for the program. He later became a member of the PGA and president of United States Golf Corporation.

Men's soccer, which began as a club sport in the 1970s, was organized by Rolf Bell who wanted soccer to become an official sport at CLC. The team first gained recognition when Peter Schraml took over the program in 1978 and the team first recorded their 10–8 victory. Among the standout soccer players were Bruce Myhre, NAIA All Far West Honorable Mention and All District Second Team. Jack Carroll made All District First Team in 1984, while Chris Doheny earned Second Team All District Honors. Another notable player was Foster Campbell, who was named to the SCISA Northern League First Team. Per Ivar Roald, a former member of the Norwegian national youth team, played soccer for the Kingsmen in 1993. In the fall, he led the team with nine goals and seven assists. Another Kingsmen player, Dave Salzwedel, later played in Major League Soccer and the American Professional Soccer League. In women's soccer, the Regals have won ten straight league championships.

In women's cross-country, Cathy Fulkerson set a school record in 1982 and was the captain of the team for three years and a national AIAW qualifier for three years. Fulkerson won All-American honours at the AIAW nationals of 1979, and the women's team won the AIAW Regionals in 1981. Another standout in track and field was Beth Rockliffe who in 1981 won several school records, including in the high jump and javelin. The women's softball team hosted the NAIA District III championships in 1984 and Kim Peppi won All District honors for her pitching. The head coach for the softball team is Debby Day, who also is the pitching coach for the Israeli National Team. A Regals lacrosse team will be added in the spring of 2020, making CLU the seventh university in SCIAC to compete in women's lacrosse.

A tryout by the Olympic USA Team Handball was held at the university in 2009. With over sixty athletes attending, it was the fourth such tryout organized by the sport's governing body and saw the biggest turnout.

== Student media ==
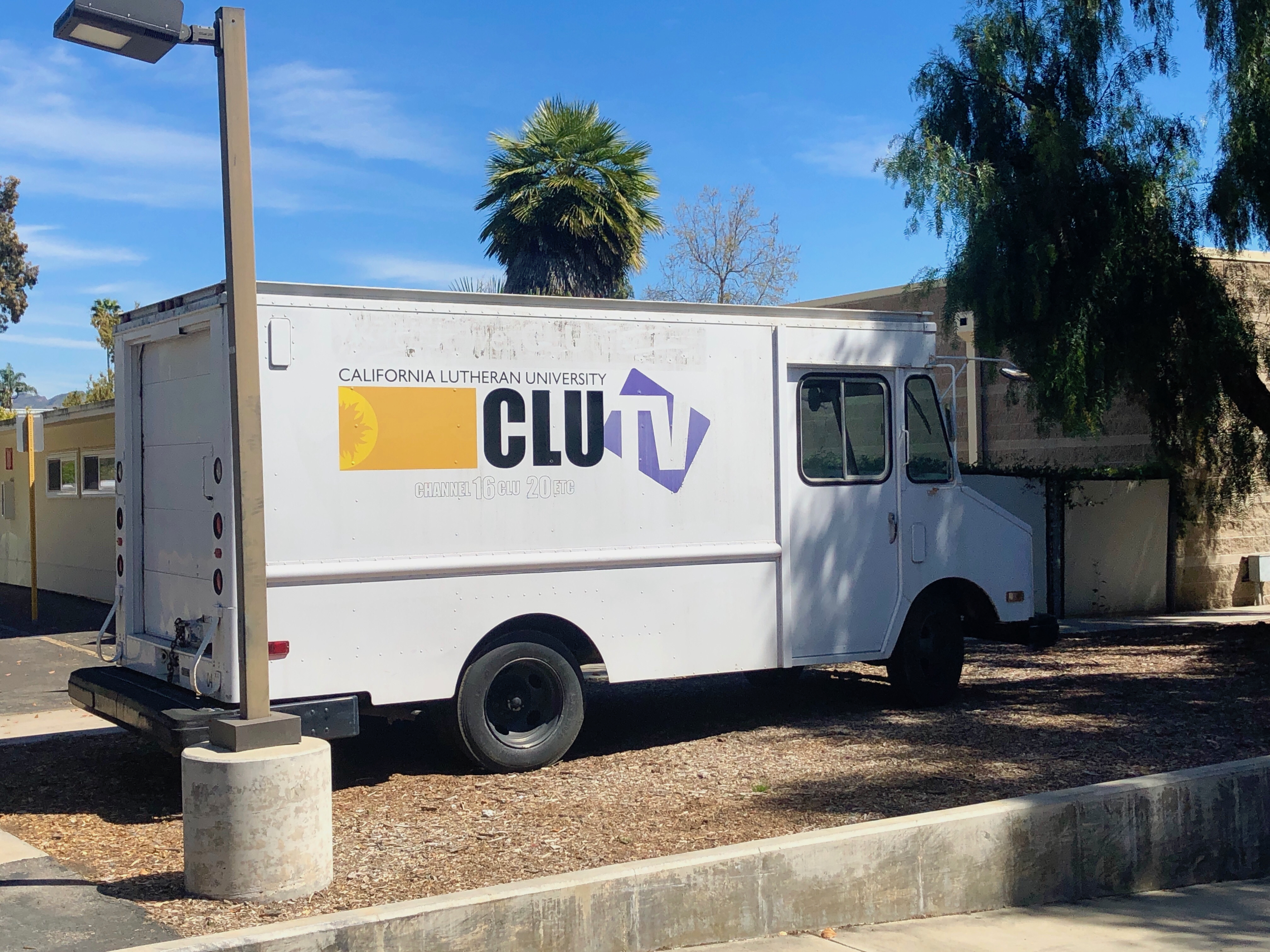
CLUTV news van

The Echo is the student news outlet. It has received numerous awards, including a first place in the 2018 California College Media Association Award for Excellence in Student Media. The Echo was awarded the highest commendation possible in 1982, the All-American award. The Morning Glory, a literary magazine which has been published since 1971, was one of six in the country to receive the Pacemaker Award in 1983. After having won All-American awards for 10 consecutive years, the magazine was inducted into the All American Hall of Fame by the Associated Collegiate Press in 1990. Morning Glory won the All-American award for the 19th consecutive year in 1999. It has been named an Associated College Press winner of the All-American and National Pacemaker Awards.

CLUTV is a student made TV station operating at Cal Lutheran. It features programs such as news, collegiate sports, and soap operas. The television station has acquired a news van which is frequently used for broadcasting of sporting events.

=== KCLU-FM ===
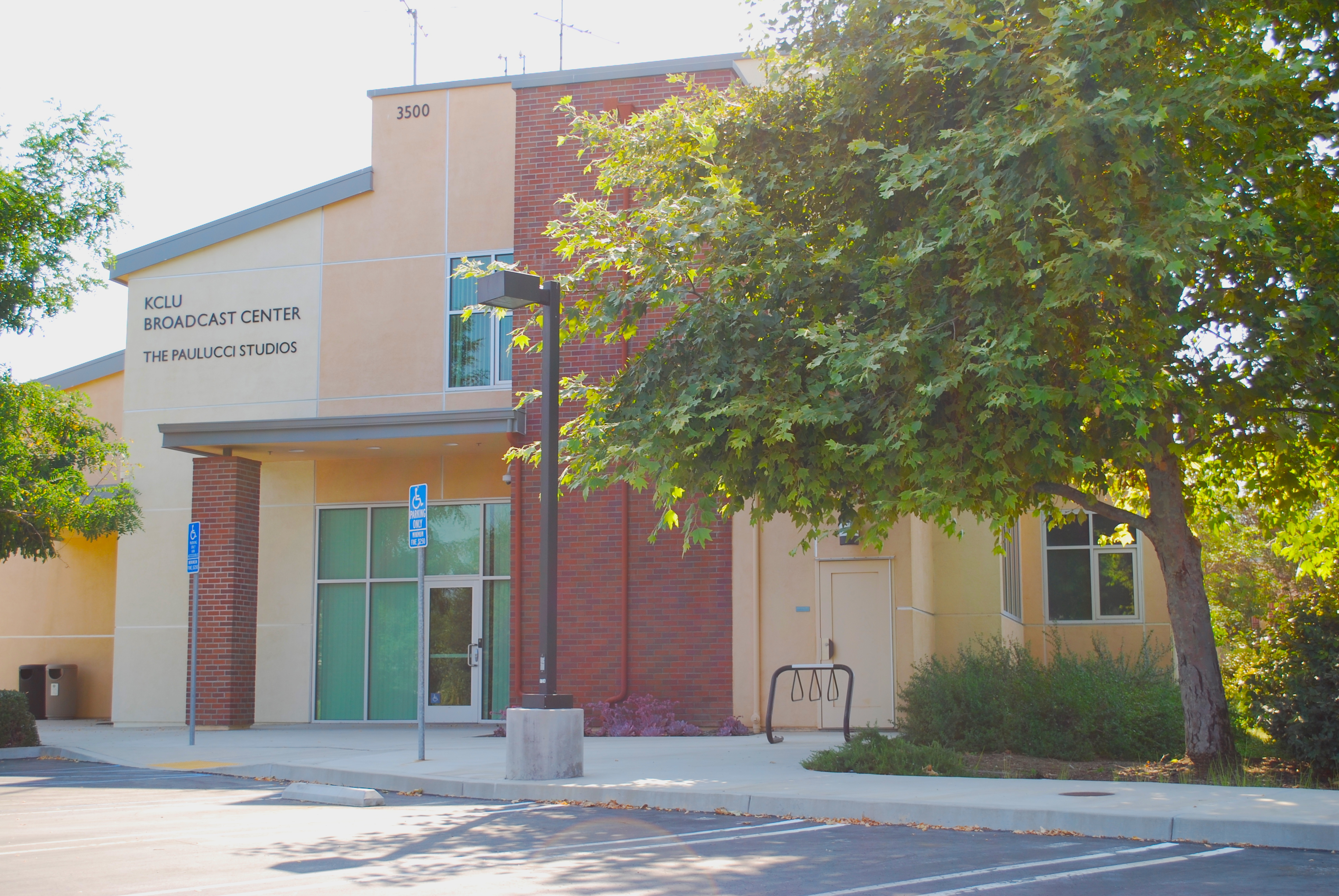
KCLU is the only public radio station in Ventura County.

KCLU-FM is a non-commercial radio station located on the campus of California Lutheran University. The National Public Radio-member station broadcasts to 130,000 weekly listeners in Ventura County at 88.3 FM, in southern Santa Barbara County at 102.3 FM and 1340 AM, on the Central Coast at 89.7 FM, and in San Luis Opispo at 92.1 FM. KCLU purchased KIST-AM 1340 for $1.44 million in April 2008, becoming the only NPR station on AM radio in Southern California. As of 2008, KCLU has won over 100 major journalism awards, including numerous awards from the Associated Press and the Radio and Television News Association of Southern California. Between 2001 and 2010 KCLU has won more than 60 Golden Mike Awards. Between 2001 and 2010 KCLU also won 18 Edward R. Murrow Awards for journalistic excellence.

The Thousand Oaks City Council approved a special use permit in 1993 which allowed California Lutheran University to construct a radio tower and FM antenna on top of Mountclef Ridge.

== Professional football ==
=== Dallas Cowboys ===
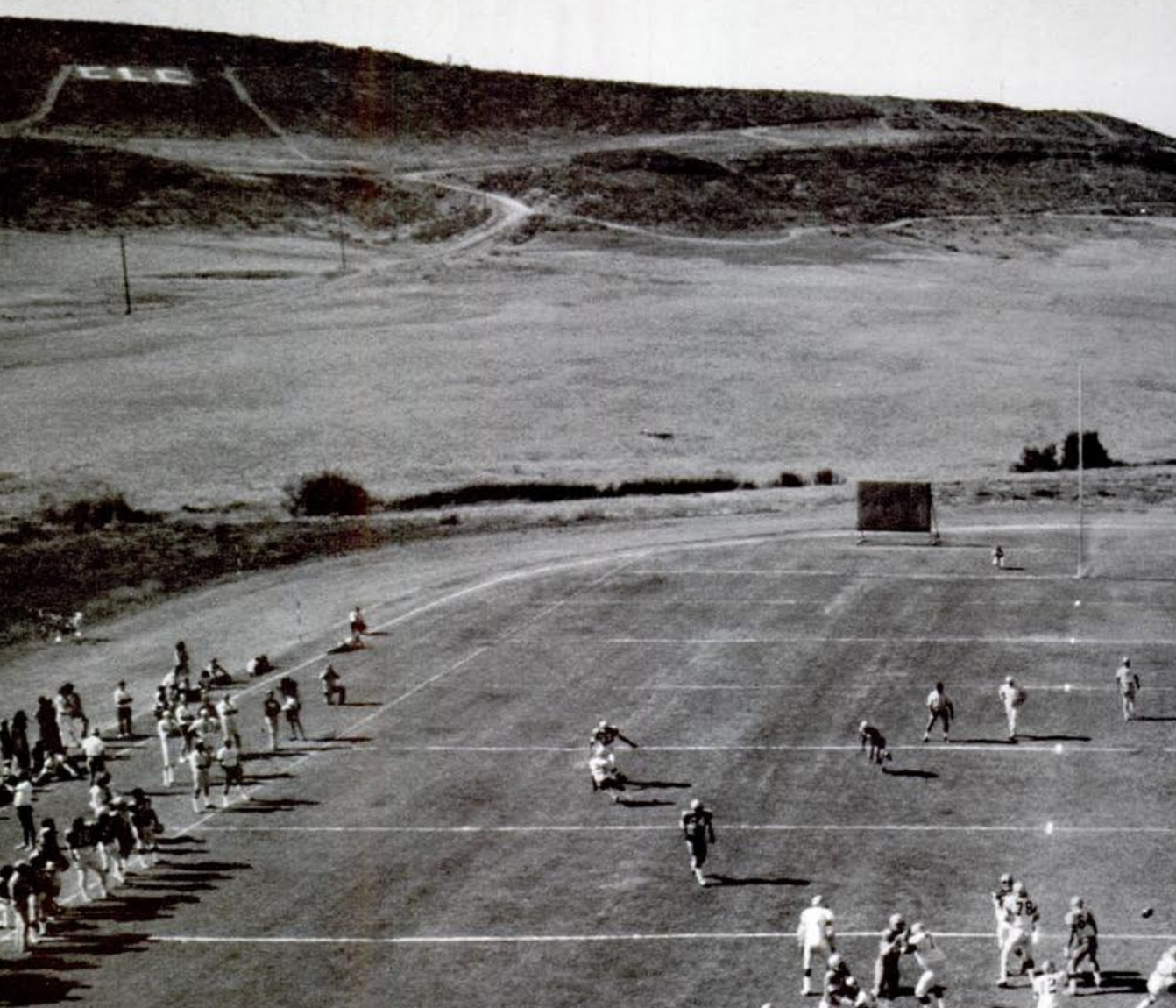

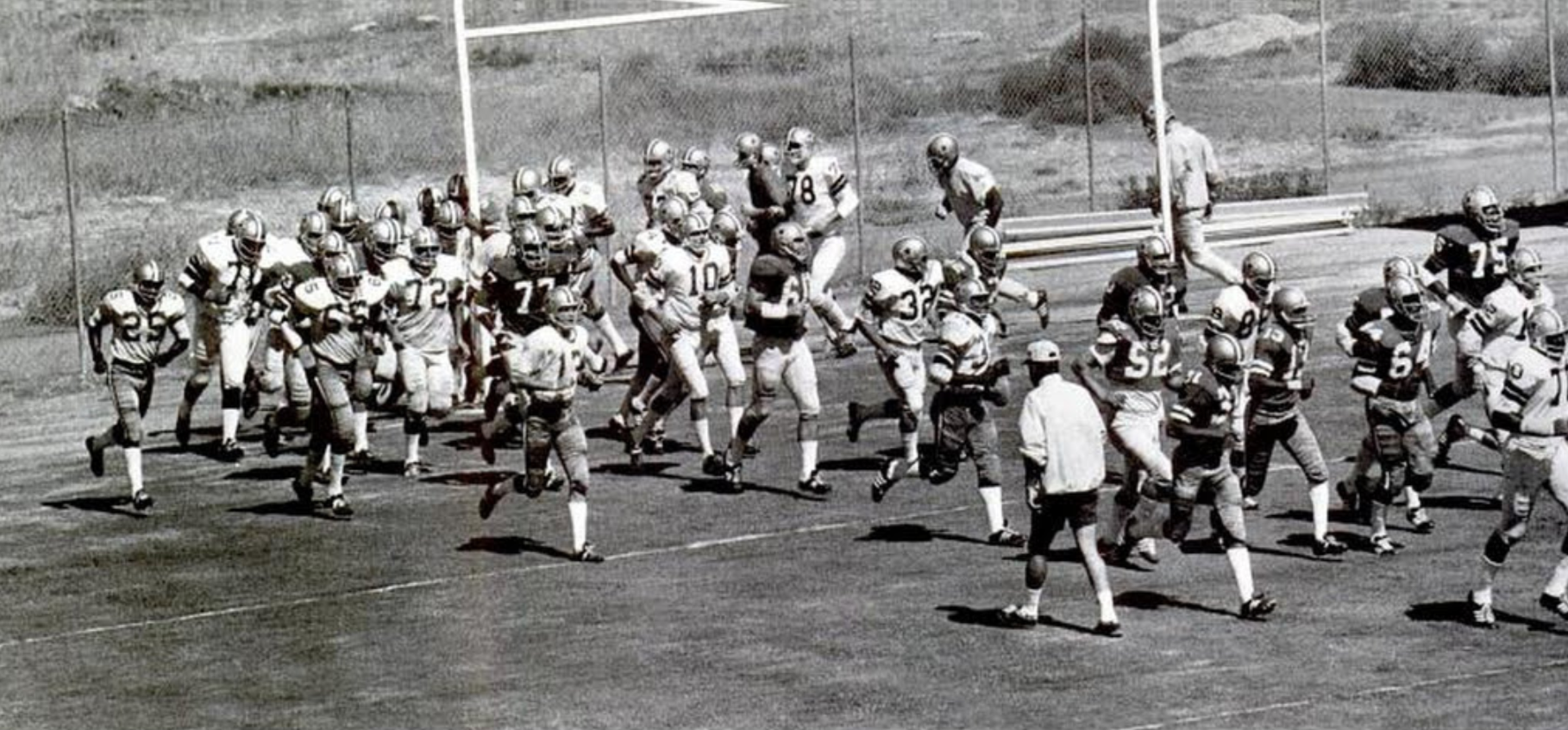

Tex Schramm, the general manager of the Dallas Cowboys, was searching for a California summer home for his NFL team in the early 1960s. Schramm made a meeting with Orville Dahl, the president of California Lutheran College, in 1962. Dahl told Schramm that the college would expand the following year by adding a gymnasium, practice fields, training facilities, and dormitory accommodations for football players. The team was then among the newest expansion teams in the National Football League. The college functioned as the team's training camp for 27 years: from 1963 to 1989. The relationship between the school and the team has been described as one of the friendliest relationships between a professional sports organization and a college. CLU football coach Bob Shoup was instrumental in helping to bring the Dallas Cowboys to Cal Lutheran. President Tex Schramm liked the CLU campus due to the weather being cooler than in Dallas, and due to its isolated location and relatively close proximity to a major airport.

The university benefited greatly from the Cowboys’ presence. Coach Bob Shoup has been described as “de facto host” for the NFL team, and he was able to pick up techniques from the team by spending time around its players and coaches. Tom Landry welcomed college coaches who wanted to observe him and his staff, and he reached out to the coaches at CLU. Landry and Shoup also put together two major events each summer: a coaching clinic which drew as many as 500 people and a charity function known as the Christian Businessmen's Club Day. From its beginning, CLU held an annual “Welcome Cowboys” dinner, which was sponsored by the Community Leaders Club at Mount Clef Stadium. The Dallas Cowboys helped build locker rooms, donated weights to CLU and, from 1980 to 2002, the university awarded the Landry Medal named after the team's coach to honor those who have been an inspiration to youth. The medal was given to Nancy Reagan, Roger Staubach, Bob Hope, Charles Schulz, Sparky Anderson, Jim Murray, Gene Stallings, John Wooden, and others. University officials said CLU financially broke even by housing the team each summer and they also pointed out the benefits of the team's presence, including the nationwide media attention.

The Dallas Cowboys first settled at their CLC training camp in the 1963 season. Bob Lilly, a defensive tackle for fourteen seasons (1961–1974), described his time at CLC in his memoir A Cowboy’s Life (2008): “The mountainous terrain surrounding the college was beautiful. Every day in the late afternoon we would jog over the mountains. Behind them stood a large ranch that was home to many movie sets. As a matter of fact, the TV series Gunsmoke was filmed there as well as the reenactment of the historic flag-raising on Iwo Jima.” The summers at CLC originally consisted of two daily practices – one at 9 am and another at 3 pm.

In the 1970s, Cal Lutheran was noted for its strong football program and the college was home to three athletic fields, a weight-lifting yard, and a couple of running tracks. Cliff Harris, who played safety for the Cowboys through the 1970s, was the roommate of defensive end Pat Toomay at CLC. Harrison described his experiences at the college in his book Captain Crash and the Dallas Cowboys: From Sideline to Goal Line with Cliff Harris (2014).

Bill Bates’s sleepwalking reached its peak during his first Cal Lutheran summer camp in 1983, where he knocked a dresser on top of roommate John Warren while they were both asleep. They were also roommates of Mark Tuinei and Chris Schultz during their summers at CLC.

The building that once housed the team has been transformed into family homes. In 1987, Tom Landry told Los Angeles Times that the facilities at Cal Lutheran had become one of the best in the NFL.

=== Los Angeles Rams ===
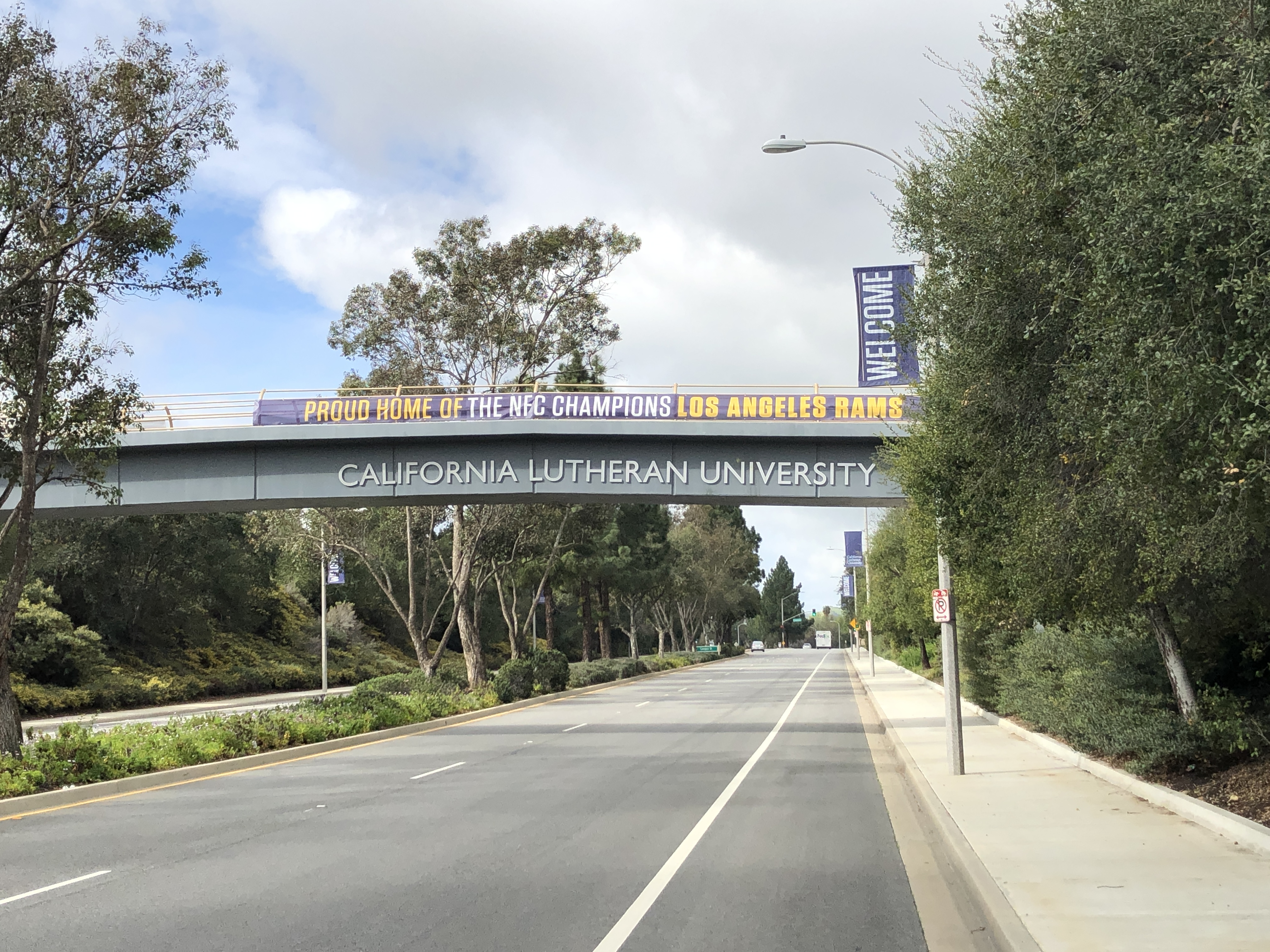
Los Angeles Rams banner at Luedtke Bridge following the team's championship win in NFC.

The Los Angeles Rams began using the university as their year-round training facilities in 2016. California Lutheran University was deemed the best place available when the Rams returned to Southern California after 21 years in St. Louis, Missouri. On March 30, 2016, the president of CLU announced that the NFL team would construct a training facility on the north side of campus.

At an annual priority-setting meeting held by the Thousand Oaks City Council in 2018, the council made finding the team a permanent home in the city a number one priority. The original contract between the Rams and CLU was a two-year deal, but an extension was made allowing the team to practice at CLU until at least 2022. The training facilities were located off of Campus Drive in a fenced-in area that was not open to the public. Although temporary buildings were to be removed when the Rams construct their permanent training complex in Los Angeles, the university's athletic teams continue to use the fields after the team departed, and the university will be able to utilize the infrastructure for future athletic facilities.

Following the November 2018 Thousand Oaks shooting, members of the CLU Choir performed the National Anthem at the Los Angeles Memorial Coliseum before the start of the Rams’ game against the Kansas City Chiefs.

== Recreation ==
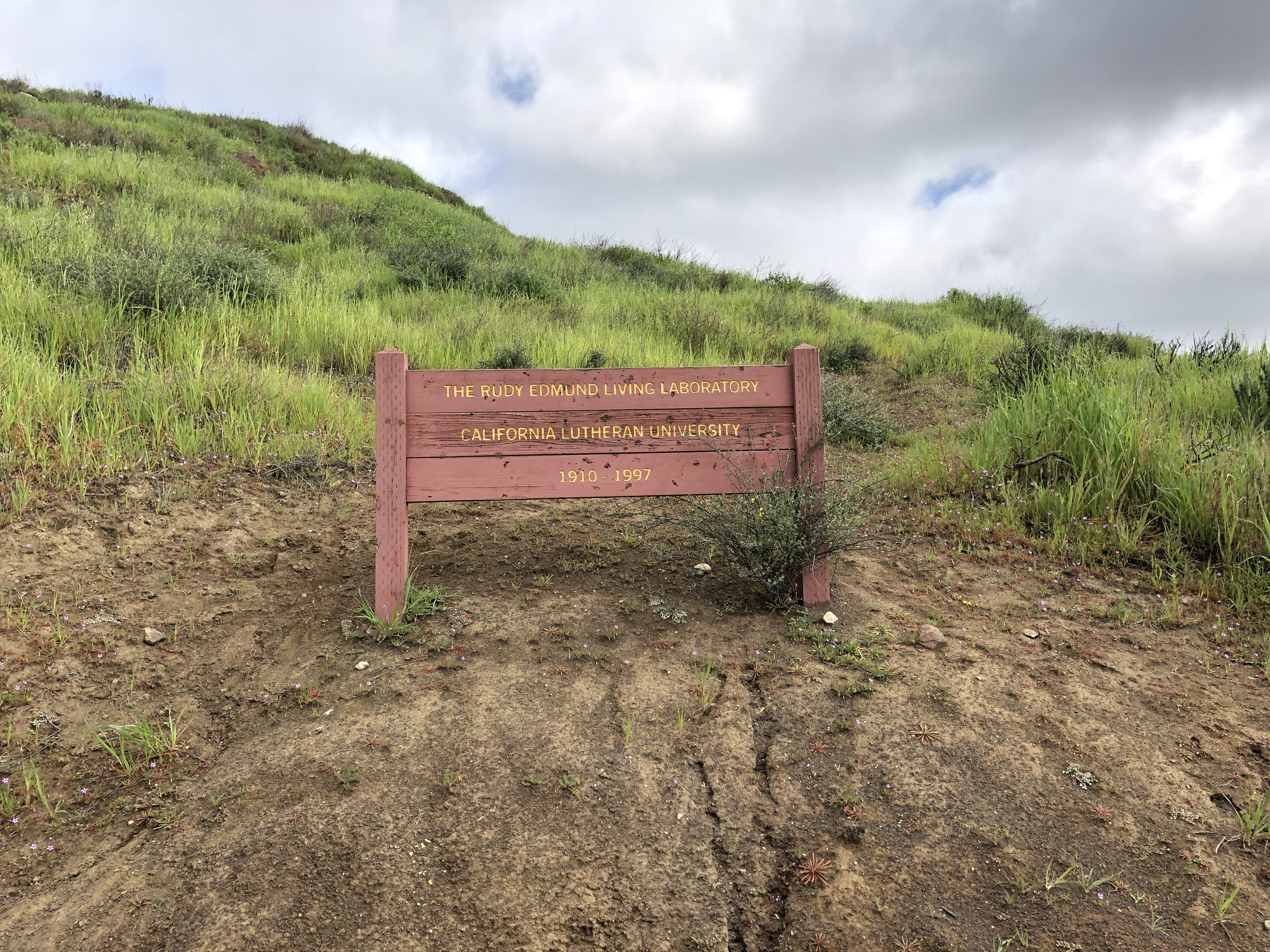
Hiking trails can be found around Rudy Edmund Living Laboratory

The northern section of the university campus contains trail access to Mount Clef Ridge Trail in Mount Clef Open Space. This trail later becomes Santa Rosa Trail, which enters Wildwood Regional Park and follows Mount Clef Ridge. Wildflower Butte Trail is another hiking trail which connects to Wildwood, with a trailhead from the parking area on Campus Drive, north of Olsen Road. This is an ancient Chumash trail which connects to Chumash sites such as Ven-37, Ven-6, and former Chumash village sites within Wildwood.

Mount Clef Ridge Open Space, which borders the university on the north, totals 217 acres (88 ha) and supports fauna such as mountain lion, coyote, deer, and gray fox. The open space surrounds Mount Clef Ridge, a volcanic ridge named for the California Lutheran Education Foundation (CLEF), which worked to establish CLU in the 1950s. The ridgeline extends from the Norwegian Grade to Wildwood Regional Park.

Besides the rock formation that spells out “CLU” atop Mount Clef Ridge, a cross is located immediately east from the landmark letters on the hilltop. The 30-foot tall cross is made from old telephone poles. This site on Mount Clef is known as Dr. Rudy Edmund Living Laboratory and was dedicated on May 5, 2003, in order to enhance student research in biology and geology. The trailhead is found at the north end of Mountclef Boulevard (corner of Mountclef Blvd. and Magellan Street).

Woken Walk is a hiking trail along the riparian corridor behind the university's athletics complex. It was dedicated in October 2009 and goes from Mountclef Boulevard to the Riparian Building.

== In popular culture ==
Scenes from the film Spartacus (1960) were shot directly behind the university, where an army can be seen storming off Mount Clef Ridge.

A Western village was erected on campus during the filming of Welcome to Hard Times (1967).

The Dodge City set in Gunsmoke (1955–1975) was located on a back lot at CLU, and Wuthering Heights (1939) was filmed on land which later became the university campus (Olsen Ranch).

Scenes from Lassie (1954) were shot on and around the university campus. Furthermore, an episode ("The Good Doctor") of the television series Highway to Heaven (1984–1989) was partially filmed here and features the university football team. A horror movie, The Clonus Horror (1979), was partially filmed at CLU.

An episode of Behind the Lights: the Coolest Jobs Behind the Biggest Sports (2012), a series BBC Worldwide is co-producing with Break Media, was filmed at CLU and featured the captain of the United States men's national water polo team.

The documentary series All or Nothing: A Season with the Los Angeles Rams (2017) also features scenes from CLU.

Members of the Theater Department were featured in an episode of the HBO program Vice News Tonight on November 19, 2018, where they discussed the CLU play "Columbinus" based on the Columbine High School massacre.

== Notable people ==
=== Alumni ===
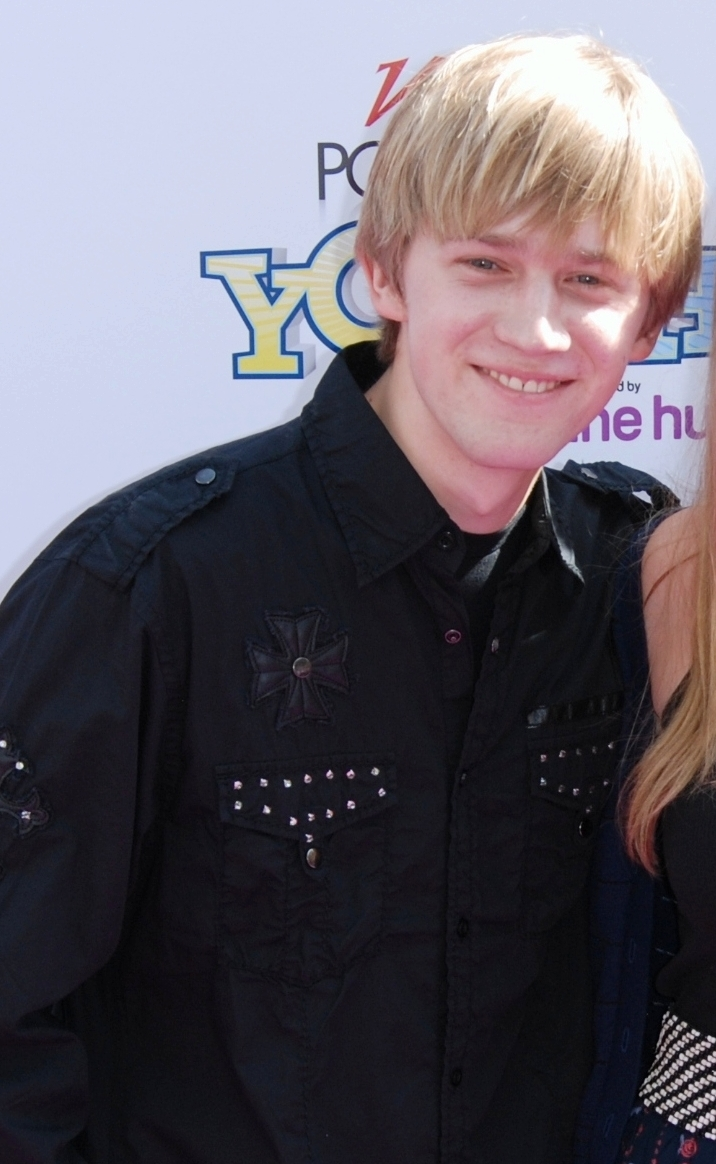
Disney Channel actor Jason Dolley.

- Catherine Byrne – politician serving as the Nevada State Controller
- Desta Hagos – Ethiopian painter
- Eric Dever fine artist, painter
- Jason Dolley – actor
- Jacquelynne Fontaine – 2006 Miss California
- Joe Fuca – businessman and CEO of Reputation.com
- Ray Haynes – former California State Senator and Assemblyman
- Carol Heyer – author and illustrator
- Diop Kamau – civil rights activist
- Kiara Nowlin – gymnast
- Cortney Palm – actress
- Bianca Santos – actress
- Carly Schroeder – actress
- Michael Dean Shelton – actor
- Alison Viktorin – voice actress for Adult Swim
- Talon Warburton – actor and voice actor
- Anna Wikland – Country Director for Google Sweden
- James Ware – retired federal judge of the U.S. District Court for the Northern District of California
- Moe Set Wine – Miss Universe Myanmar 2013

=== Faculty ===
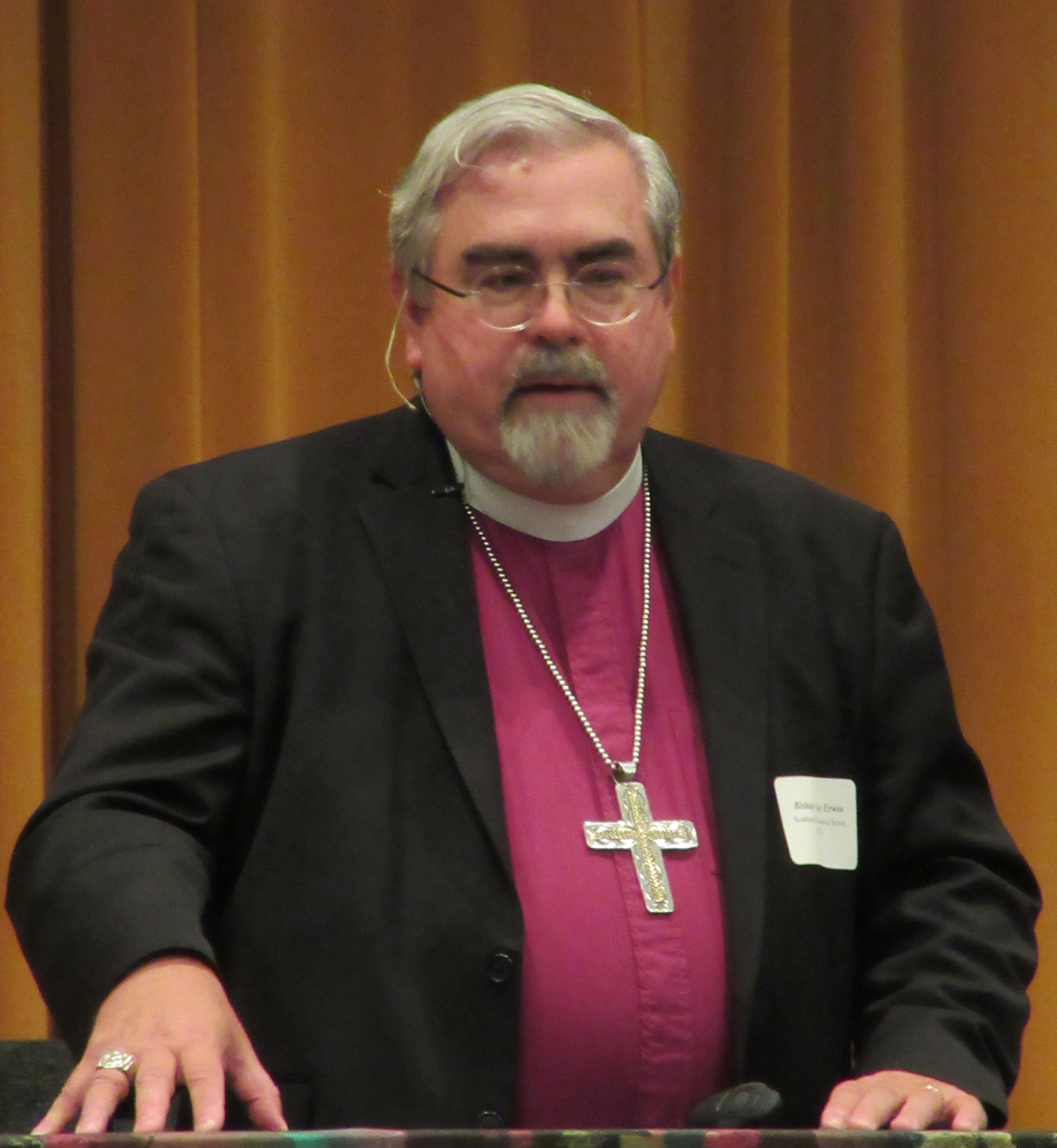
Guy Erwin, professor at CLU and first Native-American bishop in the ELCA

- Barbara J. Collins – author, ecologist, geologist, botanist, and professor
- Roland Dille – president of Minnesota State University Moorhead from 1968 to 1994
- Paul Egertson – clergyman and Bishop of the Southwest California Synod of the ELCA
- Guy Erwin – first Native-American and first openly gay bishop in the Evangelical Lutheran Church in America; first full-time holder of CLU's first endowed chair, the Gerhard and Olga J. Belgum Chair of Lutheran Confessional Theology.
- Elwin D. Farwell – sixth president of Luther College, Iowa
- William Gartner – professor of entrepreneurship
- Jeff Gorell – deputy mayor of the City of Los Angeles for Homeland Security and Public Safety; former state assemblyman
- James Kallas – former NFL player for the Chicago Bears
- Paul Orfalea – founder of Kinko's (FedEx Office)
- Dru Pagliassotti – author and editor of The Harrow
- Michael Pearce – figurative painter and author
- Elmer Ramsey – conductor of Conejo Symphony Orchestra
- Bernardus Weber – Dutch sculptor, draughtsman, and pastellist
- Cynthia Wyels – mathematician
