= Cal Lutheran Kingsmen and Regals =

California Lutheran University varsity teams

- University: California Lutheran University
- Nickname: Kingsmen (men); Regals (women)
- NCAA: Division III
- Conference: SCIAC
- Location: Thousand Oaks, California
- Varsity teams: 22
- Football stadium: William Rolland Stadium
- Basketball arena: Gilbert Sports and Fitness Center
- Baseball stadium: George Sparky Anderson Field
- Softball stadium: Hutton Softball Field
- Aquatics center: Samuelson Aquatic Center
- Colors: Purple and Gold
- Website: clusports.com
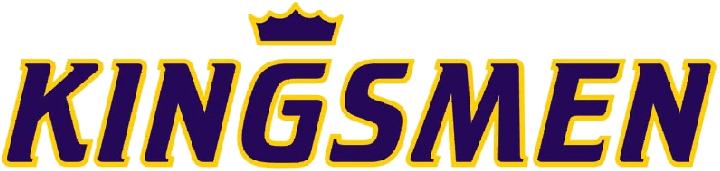

The Cal Lutheran Kingsmen and Regals are the athletic teams that represent California Lutheran University, located in Thousand Oaks, California, in intercollegiate sports as a member of the Division III level of the National Collegiate Athletic Association (NCAA), primarily competing in the Southern California Intercollegiate Athletic Conference (SCIAC) since the 1991–92 academic year. The Kingsmen and Regals previously competed in the Golden State Athletic Conference (GSAC) of the National Association of Intercollegiate Athletics (NAIA) 1986–87 to 1988–89; and as an NAIA independent from 1989–90 to 1990–91.

== Varsity teams ==
Cal Lutheran competes in 22 NCAA-sanctioned intercollegiate varsity sports: Men's sports (Kingsmen) include baseball, basketball, cross country, golf, football, soccer, swimming & diving, tennis, track & field, volleyball and water polo; while women's teams (Regals) include basketball, cross country, golf, lacrosse, soccer, softball, swimming & diving, tennis, track and field, volleyball, and water polo.

=== Football ===
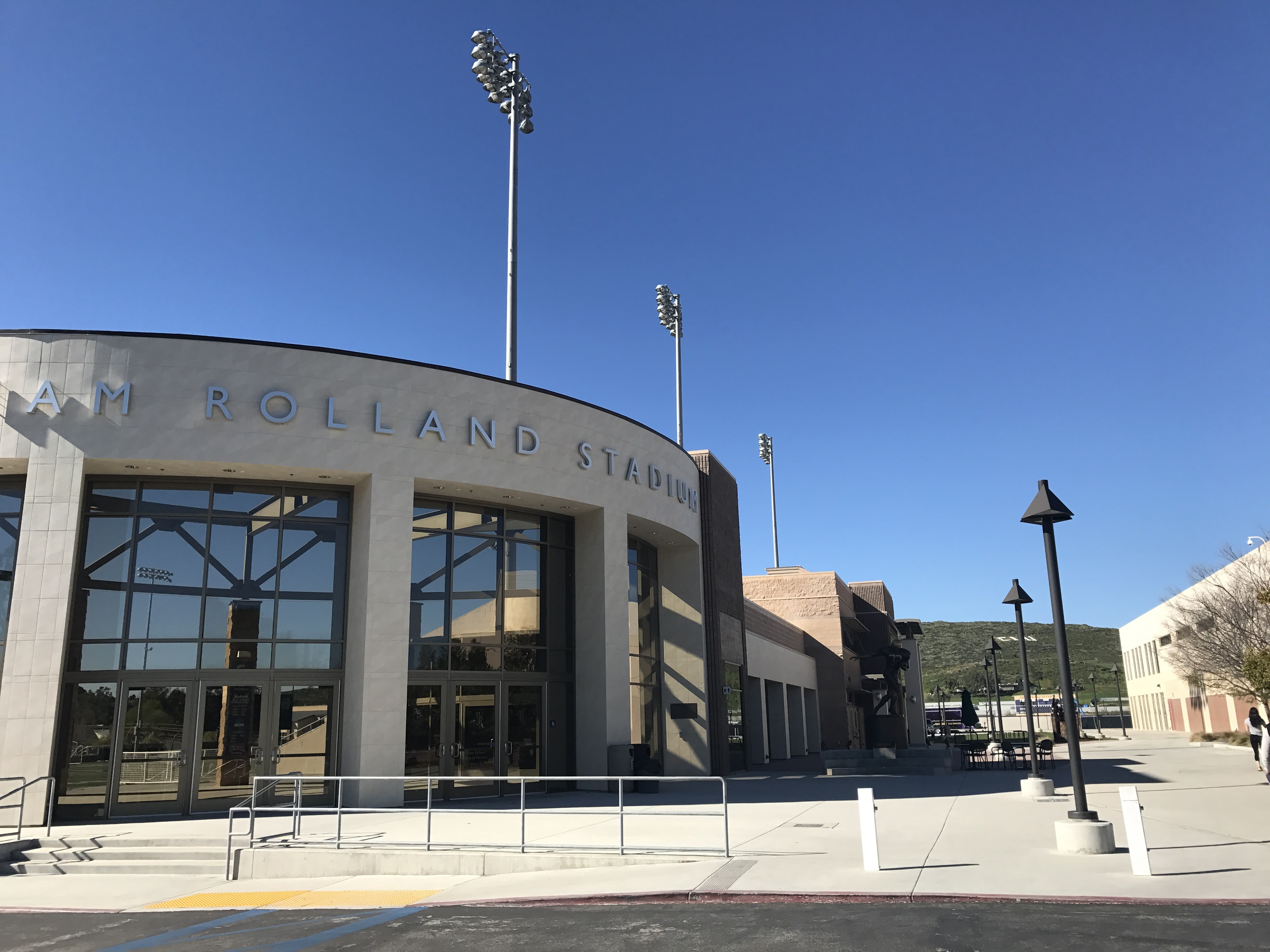
The Los Angeles Rams use CLU for training in 2016–19.

The football team won the NAIA National Championship in 1971, its only national championship to date. Head coach Bob Shoup was named NAIA Coach of the Year that season. He led the Kingsmen to 13 NAIA District 3 Championships and the 5 playoffs in his 17 years as coach.

=== Women's volleyball ===
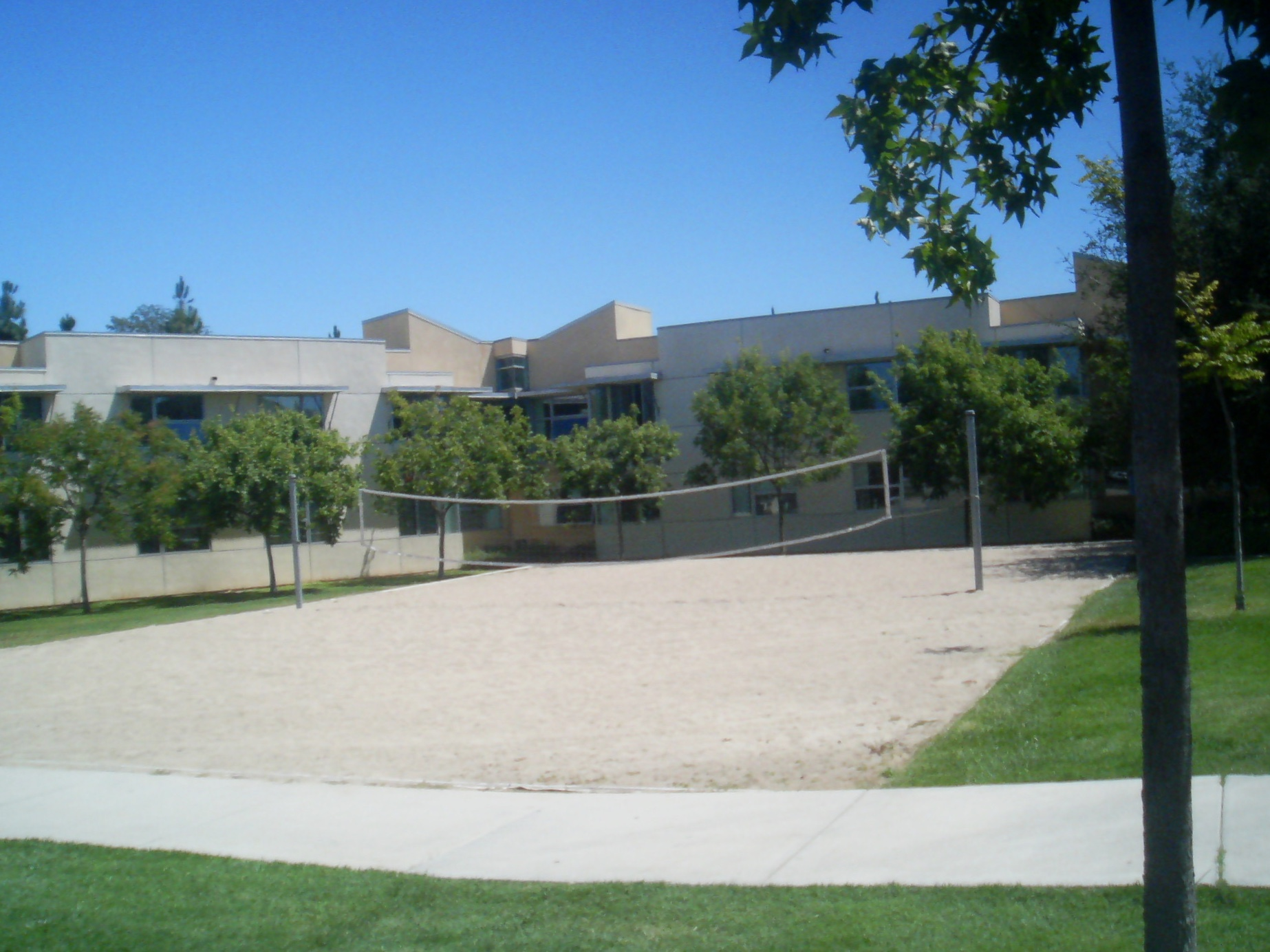
Community volleyball field

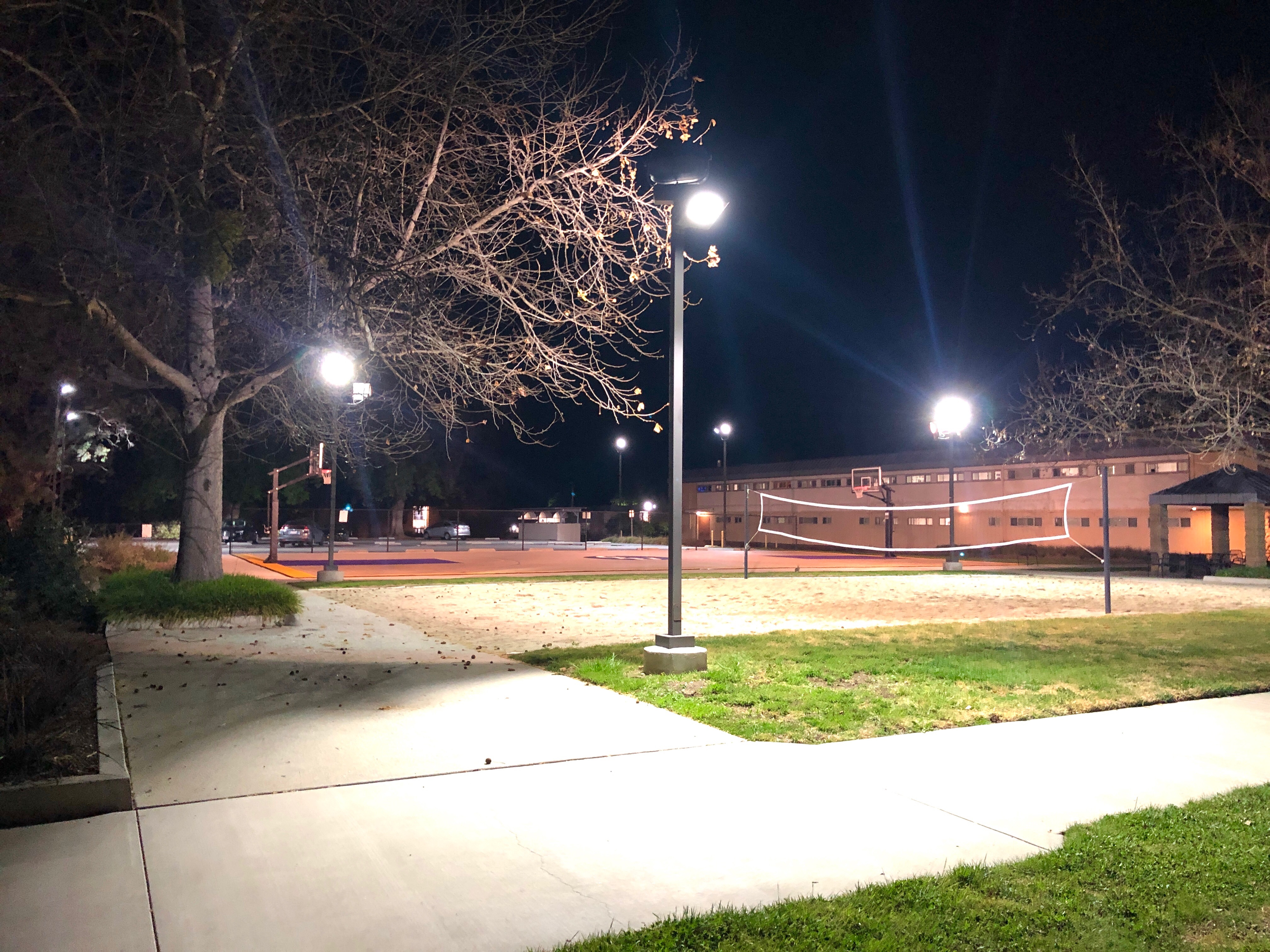
Thompson Pederson Recreation Area

In 2015, Regals volleyball won the national championship in NCAA Division III women's volleyball, defeating Wittenberg University 3–0 on November 21 in the team's third appearance in the final round. They were led by head coach Kellee Roesel. In 2016 the team made their ninth straight appearance in the NCAA Tournament and the 17th in school history. The team was ranked number two in the nation as of 2016.

The women's volleyball team has for decades periodically been the strongest competitive women's sport at CLU. Already in the early 1960s, the team played schools such as UC Santa Barbara, Westmont College and Cal State-Northridge. Handling most of the coaching for women until 1970 was Nena Amundson, who joined the faculty in 1961, hired by Orville Dahl to organize the women's athletic programs. California Lutheran College (CLC) joined the Association of Intercollegiate Athletics for Women (AIAW) when formed in 1971, and was a member until 1982 when women joined the men in the NAIA. In 1970, the female athletes adopted the name Regals for all women's sports. The team was the runner-up for the 1995 NCAA Division III women's volleyball tournament.

Notable players include Joyce Parkel, who was the captain of the volleyball team when it became a runner-up in Southern California in the late 1960s. Olympic Gold Medal swimmer Patty Kempner was the team captain when they qualified for the AIAW Regionals in 1976. The coach while Kempner played was Diana Hoffman, a volleyball player who played on six national volleyball teams and was a member of the 1964 and 1968 U.S. Olympic teams. Guiding the team from last in the league to an AIAW qualifier in two years, Hoffman is recognized for having laid the foundation for continued success for the Regals volleyball team.

=== Men's basketball ===
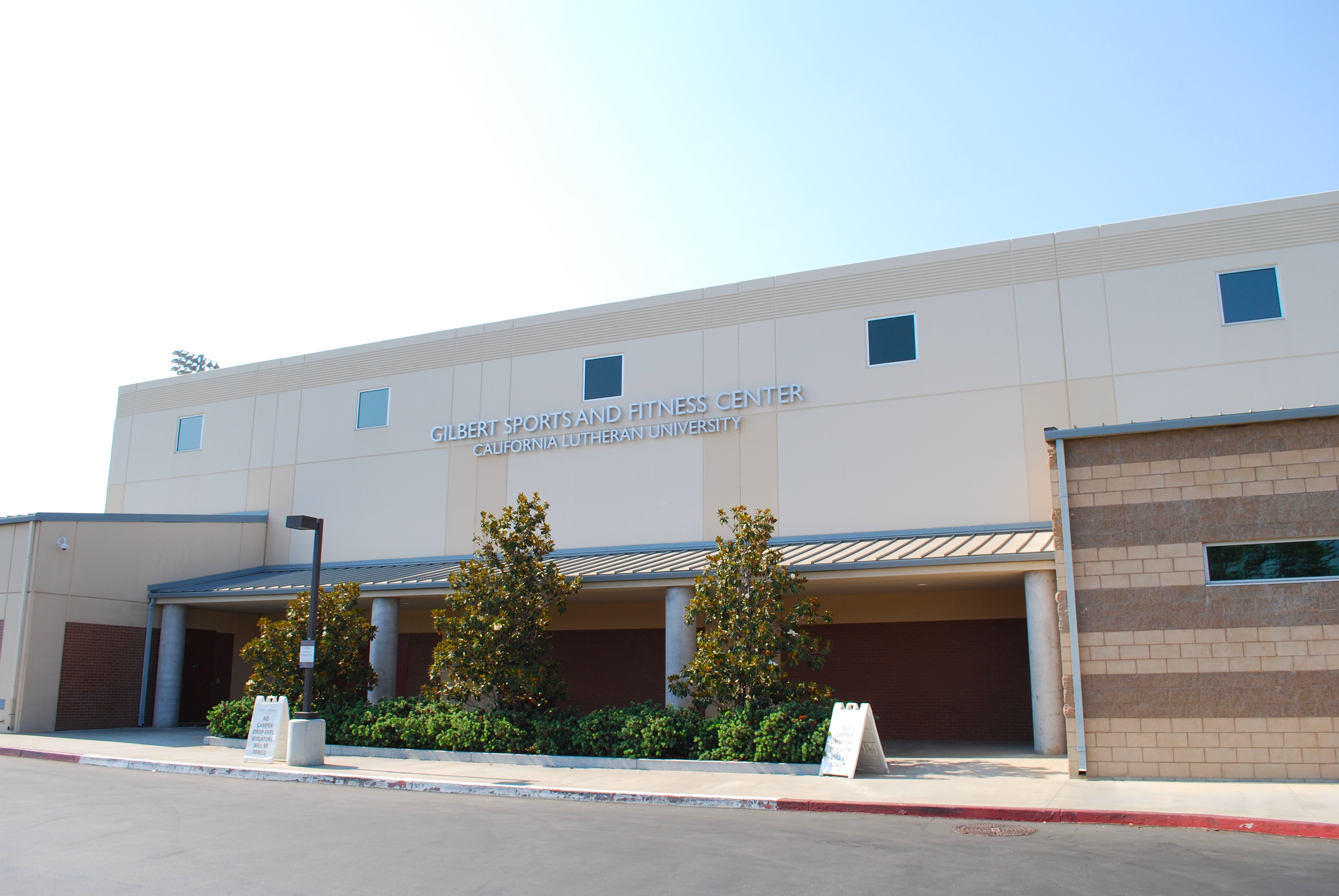
Gilbert Sports and Fitness Center

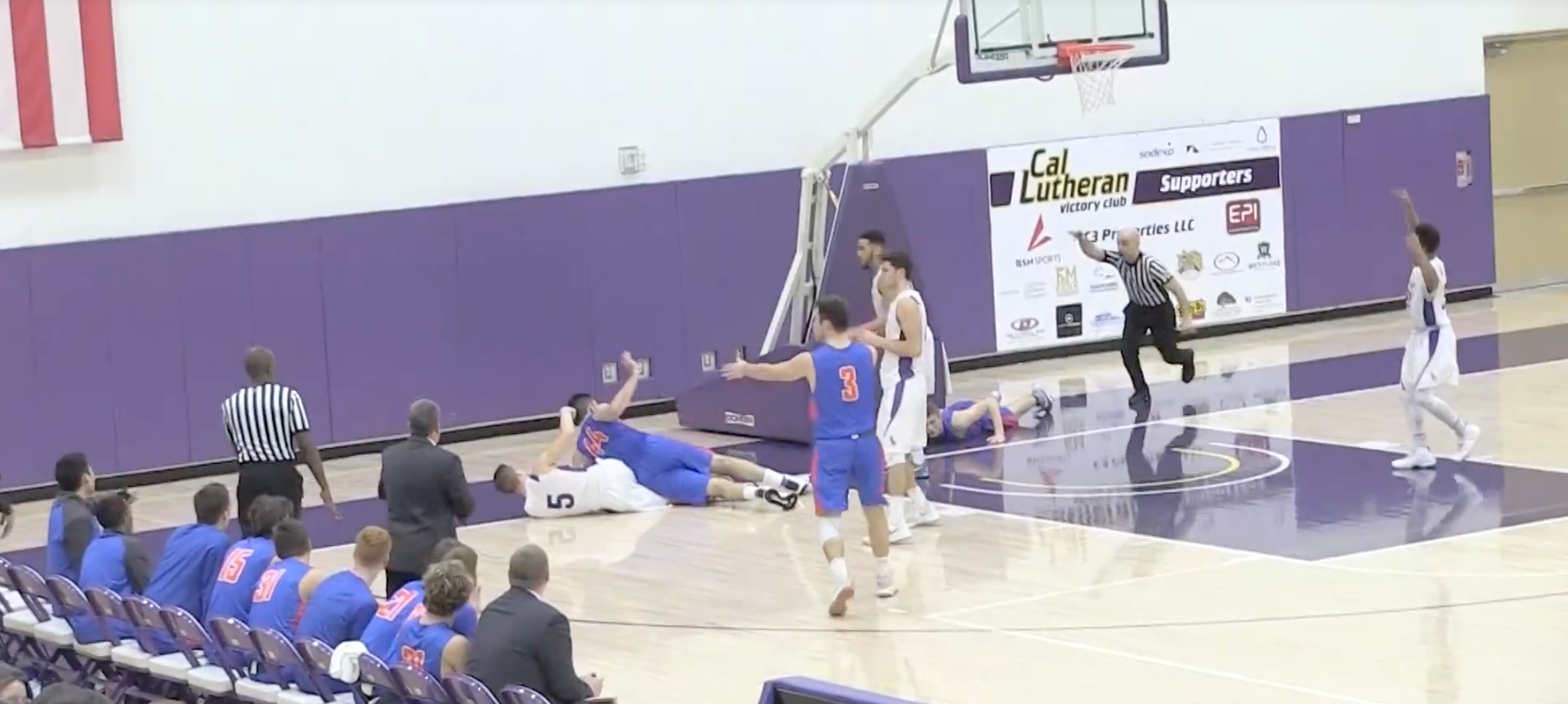
Cal Lutheran Kingsmen vs Pomona-Pitzer Sagehens, 2017.

Luther Schwich coached the CLC basketball team from 1961–63 before John R. Siemens of Westmont College became the college basketball coach and also assumed the role of Athletic Director upon Schwich's resignation. The first doctorate member of the department was Robert Campbell in 1966, who helped the academic status of the Physical Education Department. Notable individual contributions to the sport have included Al Kempfert in the 1960s, who held a 1967 record that stood for years before being toppled by Steve Jasper during the 1972–73 season. Don Bielke, a former professional NBA player from the San Francisco Bay Area and a standout at Valparaiso, joined the staff as an instructor and coach in the 1970s. Two winning years are attributed to him: the 1977–78 and 1979–80 seasons. CLC hired Ed Anderson in 1983, a coach from Pacific Lutheran University. Mike Dunlap was the head coach from 1989–1994 and guided the Kingsmen to an 80–55 record. Notable CLU players include Derrick Clark, Tim LaKose, and Jason Smith.

Tim Fusina, former head coach at Centenary University in Hackettstown, New Jersey, became head coach for the team in 2017. Fusina took over after Geoff Dains, who was named interim head coach after the resignation of Rich Rider, the winningest basketball coach in CLU history. Rider had a record of 345–207 in 22 seasons at Cal Lutheran. In the 2016 season, the Kingsmen basketball team went 20–7 past season and placed second in the Southern California Intercollegiate Athletic Conference with a 12–4 record, advancing to the Postseason Tournament for the seventh time. The team got a new head coach in 2019 when Russell White was hired. A former coach at Crespi High School, White has coached players such as London Perrantes and De'Anthony Melton.

The Los Angeles Lightning is a professional basketball team based at the Gilbert Sports Arena.

=== Women's basketball ===
The Regals basketball team plays its home contests at the Gilbert Sports and Fitness Center.

=== Wrestling ===
In the mid-1960s, the college became known throughout the NAIA District III as a wrestling power. Coach Don Garrison had a group of nineteen wrestlers who in 1969 won 12 and lost 3 matches and thereby capturing the NAIA District III championship. Upon Garrison's resignation, the team began losing more than it won, the sport subsided and funding became uncertain. Former Olympic wrestler Buck Deadrich took over as coach in 1975 and the team consequentially began to move upwards again. Deadrich, who also served as the Sports Information Director, began recruiting wrestlers to the college. During his tenure, several of the CLC wrestlers competed in national events. Ed Fleming won silver in the Pan American Games in 1980. Kim Coddington won 16 of 20 matches in 1977, and qualified for the national champion. Upon Deadrich’ resignation, the wrestling program struggled for about two years before being eliminated as a competitive sport. Football player Brian Kelley was named the NAIA District III heavyweight wrestling champion in 1970.

=== Baseball ===
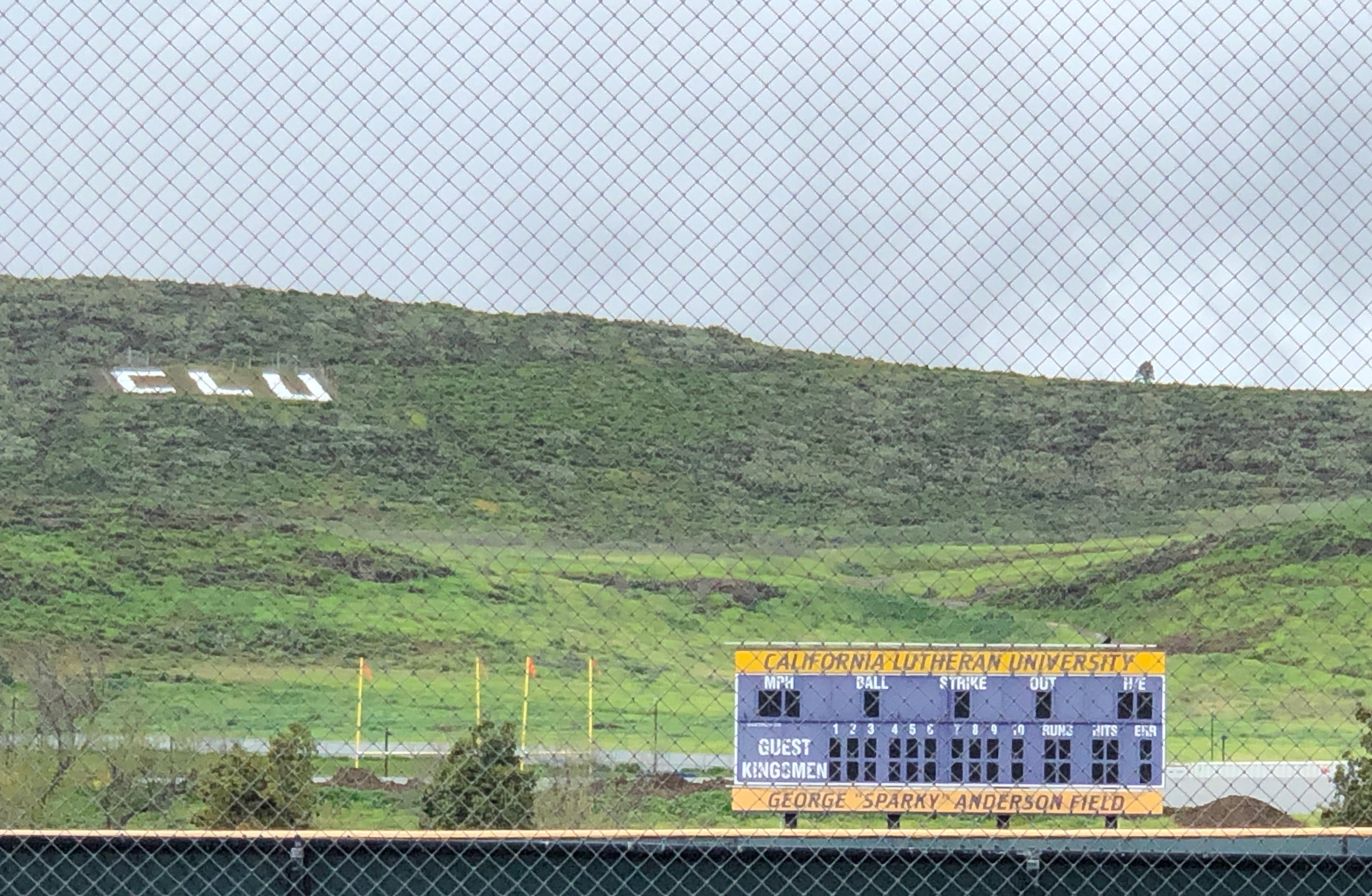
George Sparky Anderson Field.

Players Drafted By MLB Teams
2014	Jake Petersen	Los Angeles Angels
2009	David Iden	Los Angeles Dodgers
2007	Lee Ellis	Baltimore Orioles
2005	Matt Hirsh	Houston Astros
2003	Taylor Slimak	Los Angeles Dodgers
2003	Jason Hirsh	Houston Astros
2003	Brian Skaug	Houston Astros
2002	Justin Keeling	Minnesota Twins
2000	Tom Canale	Cleveland Indians
1999	Adam Springston	Atlanta Braves
1997	Richard Bell	Los Angeles Dodgers
1997	Tom McGee	Baltimore Orioles
1996	Andrew Barber	Colorado Rockies
1994	Marc Weiss	Cincinnati Reds
1992	Darryl McMillin	Kansas City Royals
1990	Blake Babki	New York Mets
1989	Daren Cornell	Milwaukee Brewers
1985	Todd Dewey	Atlanta Braves
1982	John Westmoreland	San Diego Padres
1981	Mark Butler	Baltimore Orioles
1981	Kevin Gross	Philadelphia Phillies
1977	Gary Ledbetter	New York Giants
1977	Steve Trumbauer	Los Angeles Angels
1969	Robert Fulewider	St. Louis Cardinals

On May 30, 2017, the Kingsmen won their first NCAA Division III baseball title under coach Marty Slimak. Cal Lutheran defeated Washington & Jefferson College 12–4 and 7–3 in the final two games of a best-of-three series, marking the team's sixth appearance in the championship round. Slimak has been the head coach since 1994 and is the winningest coach in CLU's history. The team has earned seven Southern California Intercollegiate Athletic Conference (SCIAC) titles during his tenure and has never placed lower than fourth in the league standings. The team has recorded over twenty wins in all but one season and has not had a single losing season during Marty Slimak's tenure. He has guided three of his teams to the Division III College World Series, where they were the runner-up in 1996 and the third-place finisher in 1999. The Kingsmen have played in three West Regionals. Eleven players have been drafted by Major League Baseball (MLB) organizations during Slimak's tenure. Besides the NCAA Division III national championship, Slimak has guided CLU to twelve conference championships, thirteen regional appearances and four World Series appearances. He was selected as the American Baseball Coaches Association/Diamond National Division III Coach of the Year in 2017. As of 2014, 24 players have been drafted for MLB organizations.

Although Baseball Hall of Famer Sparky Anderson never attended CLU, he helped raise money for the baseball team. Anderson, the only manager in history to have won World Series championships in both the American and National Leagues, was approached by the team's coach in 1979 and came up with the idea of golf tournaments to raise money for scholarships. Anderson visited the campus regularly and the university baseball team plays their home games at George Lee "Sparky" Anderson Field, named in honor of the MLB coach. The university was a five-minute walk from Anderson's residence in Thousand Oaks. After his retirement, he became a frequent visitor to CLU games.

Anderson has also used his influence to attract top names in the sport to the team. Several CLU players have been drafted for professional teams, including Kevin Gross who was drafted by the Philadelphia Phillies in 1983. Jason Hirsh was drafted by the Houston Astros in the second round of the 2003 Major League Baseball draft. MLB baseball player Ron Stillwell was the baseball coach from 1972–1978, and had a record of 139–100–1 (.581) and was named "NAIA Coach of the Year" in 1976. Rich Hill was the head coach from 1983–1985, and Lindsay Meggs was the assistant baseball coach in 1988–89.

A local baseball team, Conejo Oaks, which competes in the California Collegiate League (CCL), play their home games at the university's Ullman Stadium (George Lee "Sparky" Anderson Field).

=== Men's track and field ===
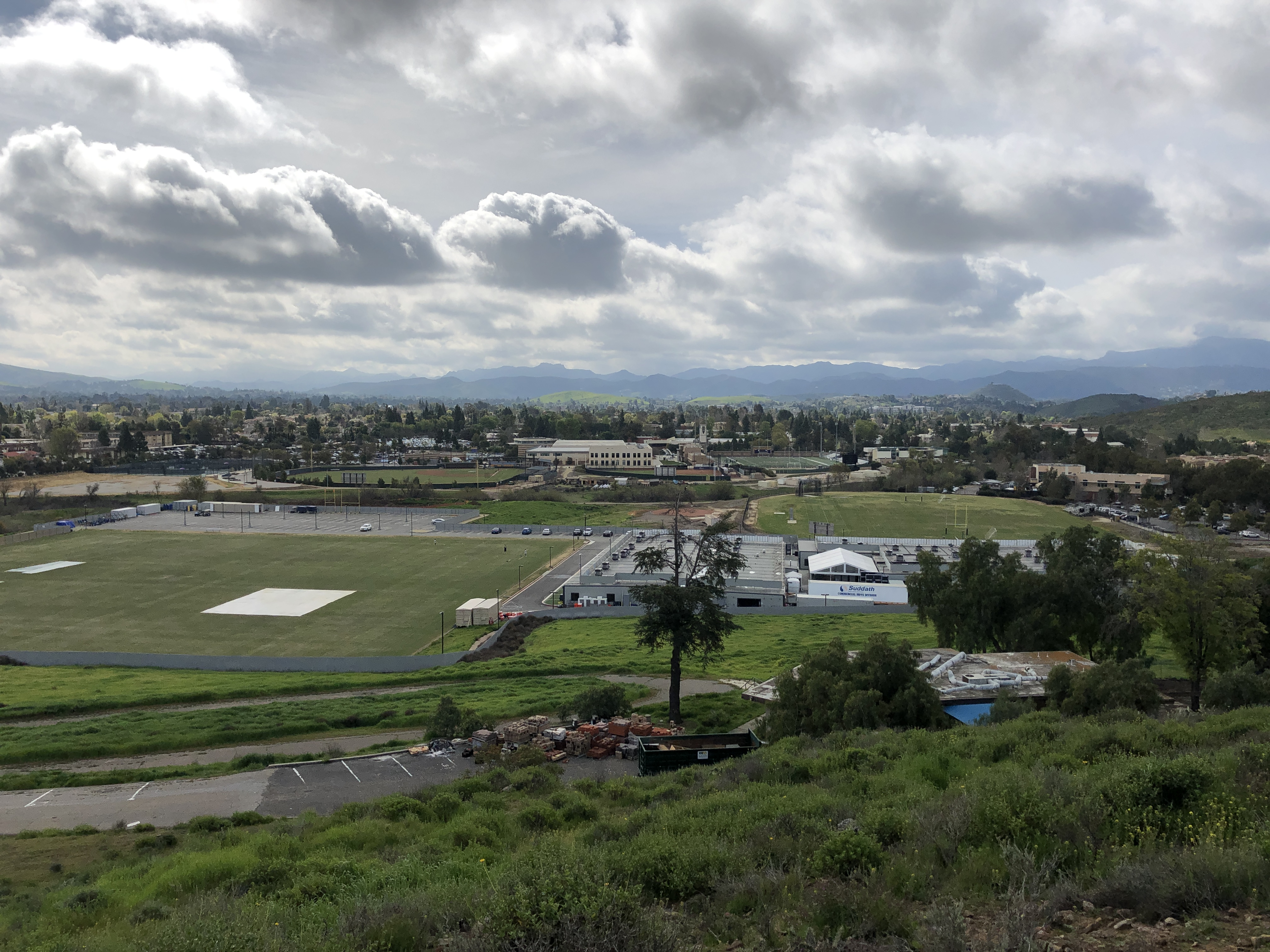
The athletics facilities

Under the coaching of Don Green, men's track and field remained a perennial winner in the NAIA. A former coach at Pomona High School, Don Green joined CLC staff in 1970 as both a track coach and defensive football coach. In 1981, the team won the NAIA District III championship, and the track runners annually competed in nationwide events. 1984 was one of the college's best years in the national championship: Matt Carney finished sixth in the decathlon and earned an All American honor with 6,269 points. In sprint relays, the team finished in sixth place with a time of 42,2 fielding a team of Ken Coakley, Roger Nelson, Maurice Hamilton and Troy Kuretich all earning All American honors. Green coached 44 All-Americans during his 21 years as coach of the track and field team. He has been inducted into the Mt. San Antonio Relays and Southern Section halls of fame. Besides a coach, he was also the college athletic director for five years in the 1970s. He retired in 1991.

Under the guidance of three different head coaches from 2000–2010, Kingsmen track and field has sent multiple representatives to compete at the NCAA national championships. Over that decade, five athletes have earned individual SCIAC titles and sixteen have made All-SCIAC with a top-six finish at conference finals.

=== Other sports ===
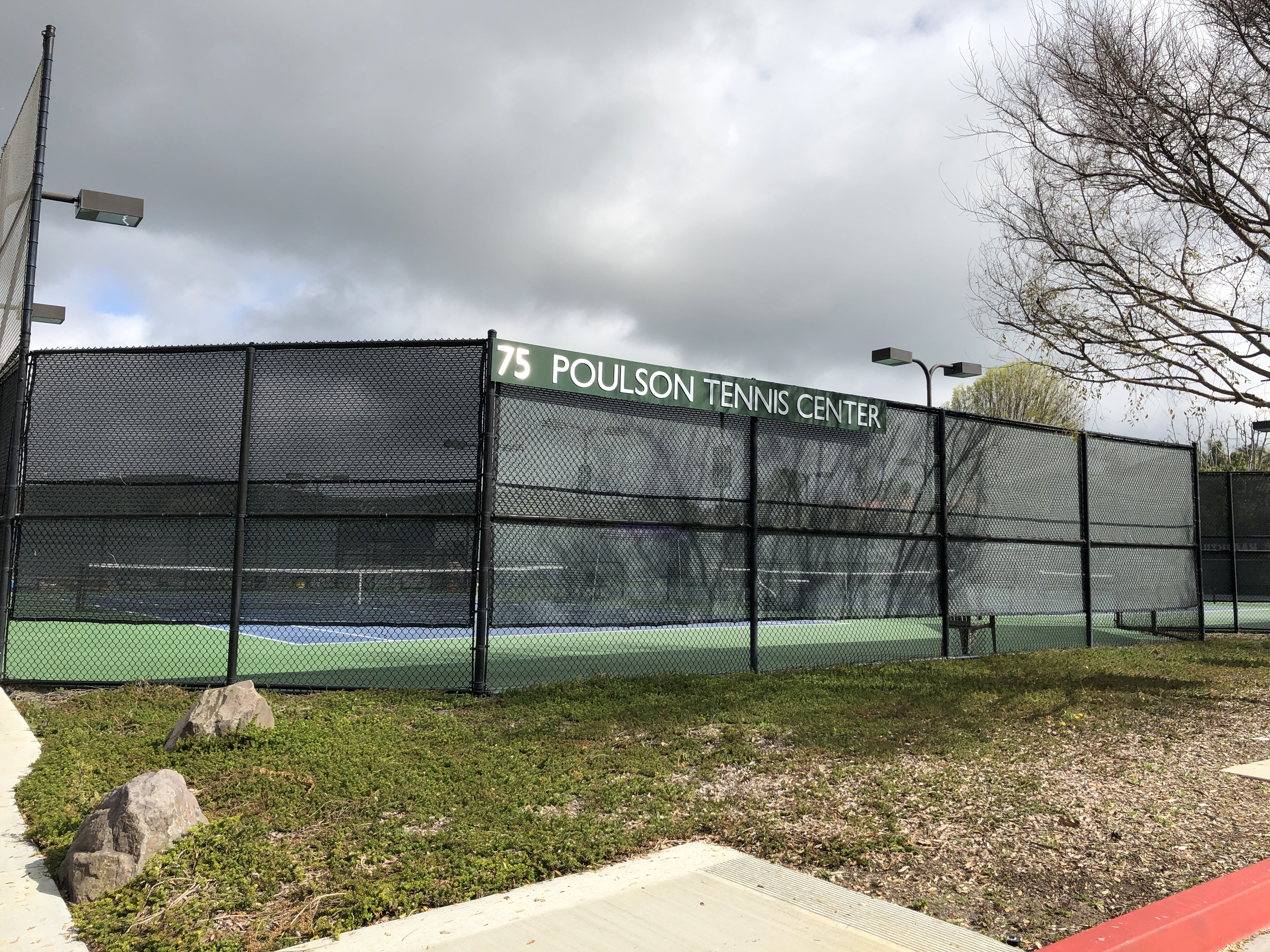
Poulson Tennis Center

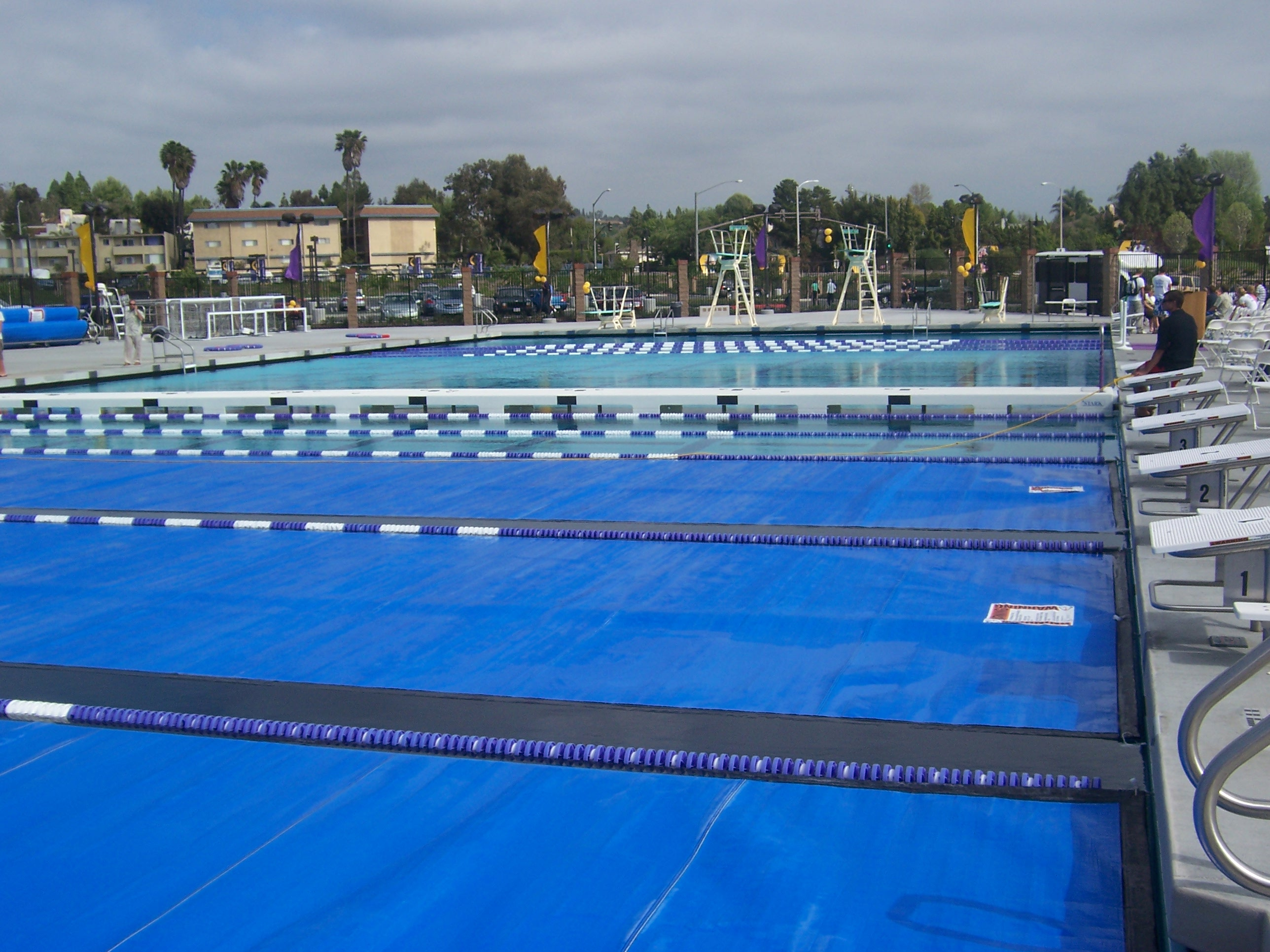
Samuelson Aquatics Center served as a training site of the 2008 and 2012 US Olympic Men's Water Polo teams.

Other sports include golf, cross-country, water polo, lacrosse, softball, tennis, as well as swim and dive. The men's volleyball team experienced one of its best years in 1978 when it recorded a 15–3 season and entered the NAIA national playoffs, where the team placed fourth in the nation under Coach Bob Ward and his assistant Don Hyatt. One of the best seasons for the men's golf team was in the 1982–83 season when CLC finished seventeenth in the national competition in Texas. During the next season, Coach Bob Shoup sent Greg Osbourne to compete in the national competition in Michigan, where he ultimately finished fourth. Osbourne captured the NAIA District III individual championship in 1984 and picked up All-America honors, and raised the bar for the program. He later became a member of the PGA and President of United States Golf Corporation.

Men's soccer, which began as a club sport in the 1970s, was organized by Rolf Bell who wanted soccer to become an official sport at CLC. The team first gained recognition when Peter Schraml took over the program in 1978 and the team first recorded their 10–8 victory. Among the standout soccer players were Bruce Myhre, NAIA All Far West Honorable Mention and All District Second Team. Jack Carroll made All District First Team in 1984, while Chris Doheny earned Second Team All District Honors. Another notable player was Foster Campbell, who was named to the SCISA Northern League First Team. Per Ivar Roald, a former member of the Norwegian national youth team, played soccer for the Kingsmen in 1993. In the fall, he led the team with nine goals and seven assists. Another player, Dave Salzwedel, later played in Major League Soccer and the American Professional Soccer League. In women's soccer, the Regals have won ten straight league championships. Regals soccer was ranked No. 8 in the 2018 NCAA Division III Western regional poll. It was also ranked No. 19 in the United States Soccer Coaches' national III. coaches poll in 2018. On December 2, 2023 with the women’s soccer team 1-0 win over Washington University in St. Louis at Roanoke College in Salem, Virginia, Regals soccer won their first ever national championship in program history.

In women's cross-country, Cathy Fulkerson set a school record in 1982 and was the captain of the team for three years and a national AIAW qualifier for three years. Fulkerson won All-American honours at the AIAW nationals of 1979, and the women's team won the AIAW Regionals in 1981. Another standout in track and field was Beth Rockliffe who in 1981 won several school records, including in the high jump and javelin. The women's softball team hosted the NAIA District III championships in 1984 and Kim Peppi won All District honors for her pitching. The head coach for the softball team is Debby Day, who also is the pitching coach for the Israeli National Team. A Regals lacrosse team will be added in the spring of 2020, making CLU the seventh university in SCIAC to compete in women's lacrosse.

The men's tennis team has captured NCAA singles (1996) and doubles (1997) titles. Coach John Siemens Jr. helped the team achieve a number two ranking in the NAIA District III race, the highest tennis achievements for the college. Mike Gennette has been the women's and men's tennis head coach for 25 seasons and has coached players such as Kayla Day and Claire Liu. He received the 2016 Player Development Coach of the Year and received recognition from the United States Tennis Association (USTA) and the United States Olympic Committee during the 2017 US Open. Gennette has coached 11 All-America honorees for the Kingsmen.

A tryout by the Olympic USA Team Handball was held at the university in 2009. With over sixty athletes attending, it was the fourth such tryout organized by the sport's governing body and saw the biggest turnout.

== NCAA Championships ==
Since joining the SCIAC in 1991 until 2002, Cal Lutheran won 26 conference championships, averaging more than five per season. As of 2019, CLU has won 55 league championships.

As of April 28, 2024, Cal Lutheran has won four NCAA team national championships.

- Men's (2)
  - Baseball (1): 2017
  - Volleyball (1): 2024
- Women's (2)
  - Volleyball (1): 2015
  - Soccer (1): 2023
