= Jerry Miller (disambiguation) =

Jerry Miller (1943–2024) was an American musician.

Jerry Miller may also refer to:

- Jerry Miller (racing driver) (1937–2018), American racing driver
- Jerry H. Miller, American professor
- Jerry T. Miller, American politician in the Kentucky House of Representatives

== See also ==
- Gerry Miller (disambiguation)
- Jerome Miller (disambiguation)
- Jeremy Miller (born 1976), American actor
- Jeremy Miller (politician) (born 1983), American politician
- Gerald Miller (disambiguation)
