= Jerry H. Miller =

Formal President of California Lutheran University

Jerry H. Miller was the fourth President of California Lutheran University, from 1981-1992. Under his tenure, Cal Lutheran finalized a $70-million expansion plan and built a library, chapel, science center, and residence hall. Controversies during his tenure included the handling of Coach Bob Shoup, who was fired in 1989 although claiming to have been promised a lifetime contract. Another controversy was the California Department of Fair Employment and Housing’s investigation of claims of age discrimination by Coach Don Green. Miller denied that personnel controversies forced him to move positions when he resigned in 1992 and became a chancellor in charge of development and fundraising.

== President of CLU ==
Prior to the presidency, Miller was a student at Harvard University and Trinity Lutheran Seminary, and later Executive Director of the National Lutheran Campus Ministry (NLCM). In his position at NLCM, he worked with Lutheran pastors, administrators, and students from all synods, including the Lutheran Church-Missouri Synod. He also served on the Board of Directors for Wittenberg University and Augustana College, Rock Island. He was inaugurated as President of California Lutheran College on May 9, 1981. One of the guest speakers during his inauguration was Sidney Rand, former President of St. Olaf College and the U.S. ambassador to Norway. A post-inaugural benefit banquet was held on May 14 where President Gerald Ford was the guest speaker. As chief executive, Miller had to immediately deal with the investigation by the Los Angeles District Attorney's Office into alleged credit fraud by public school teachers enrolled in CLC’s continuing education program. He was later able to balance the budgets for several consecutive years, and in the fiscal year of 1983-84, CLC recorded its best year in Development history bringing in a total of $3.2 million in grants and gifts. Miller later made it his top priority to construct a library.

Successful fundraising made possible the ceremonies for Pearson Library and the Learning Resources Center on April 8, 1984. During Miller’s first academic year, the dedication of Peters Hall took place on October 23, 1981, providing the school with new classrooms and faculty offices.

He later secured a 10-year accreditation for the college, the longest a college can receive and the longest accreditation ever received by WASC in its history.

Also during his tenure, the college was restructured as a university to better accommodate its growing graduate programs in education and business. He received the Christus Award by CLU in October 2012.
