= Jerome Miller =

Jerome Miller may refer to:

- Jerome A. Miller (born 1946), American philosopher
- Jerome B. Miller (1846–1920), American politician from Wisconsin
- Jerome G. Miller (1931–2015), American social worker
- Jerome Miller, character in The Killer Elite

== See also ==
- Jerry Miller (disambiguation)
