= Gerald Miller =

Gerald Miller may refer to:

- Gerald Miller (missionary) (born 1937), Mennonite medical missionary
- Gerald L. Miller (born 1942), United States Marine Corps general
- Gerald A. Miller (born 1943), American agronomist and professor
- Gerald E. Miller (1919–2014), United States Navy admiral
- Gerald R. Miller (1931–1993), American professor and author

== See also ==
- Gerry Miller (disambiguation)
- Jerry Miller (disambiguation)
