= Bernardus Weber =

Bernardus “Ben” Matheus Antonius Weber (born March 29, 1912, in Tilburg, the Netherlands – October 23, 1996 in Camarillo, California) was a Dutch sculptor, draughtsman, and pastellist. He received the honor of knighthood in the Dutch Order of Orange-Nassau by Queen Juliana of the Netherlands in 1977. Weber was a professor at California Lutheran University in Thousand Oaks, California for 22 years where he also served as the university's artist-in-residence. He operated his own Thousand Oaks art studio with clients such as Queen Wilhelmina of the Netherlands along with collectors from Beverly Hills and Hollywood. Some of his notable works include the 15-foot Enormous Luther (“Gumby”) statue at Falde Plaza on the Cal Lutheran campus as well as art utilized in films, including the Oscar-winning Doris Day film Pillow Talk (1959).

== Early life ==
Ben Weber was born in Tilburg, Netherlands on March 29, 1912. He attended the Royal Academy of Fine Arts in Belgium and later the Arts and Crafts School in Den Bosch, Netherlands. He lived with his wife Johanna Craanen in Apeldoorn from 1946 to 1953 where he was an apprentice to Johannes Henricus Andrée and later an assistant of Hein Andrée. He left for Thousand Oaks, California on August 4, 1953, and established his own art studio in California. Some of his clients included collectors from Beverly Hills and Hollywood along with Queen Wilhelmina of the Netherlands. Weber was recruited to California Lutheran College by President Orville Dahl in 1962 and became the college's first sculpture instructor. At Cal Lutheran he established a special internship program with glass and porcelain manufacturers in the Netherlands. Several of his students gained national reputations, including John Luebtow, Bill Payne, Bill Olson, Mark Gulsrud, and John Merkel. He was later knighted for his artistic accomplishments by Queen Juliana of the Netherlands in 1977 and received the title “Sir”. An abstract of Martin Luther, the Enormous Luther (“Gumby”) statue was designed by Weber and unveiled in 1986. The statue later became the university mascot.
