= 1971 college football season =

1971 college football season may refer to:

- 1971 NCAA University Division football season
- 1971 NCAA College Division football season
- 1971 NAIA Division I football season
- 1971 NAIA Division II football season
