= Sam Cvijanovich =

American gridiron football player (born 1950)

Samuel Joseph Cvijanovich
No. 51
- Position: Linebacker

Personal information
- Born: May 26, 1950 (age 76); Mesa, Arizona, U.S.
- Listed height: 6 ft 1 in (1.85 m)

Career information
- College: Cal Lutheran

Career history
- 1974–1976: Toronto Argonauts
- 1977: Ottawa Rough Riders
- 1977: BC Lions

Awards and highlights
- CFL's Most Outstanding Rookie Award (1974); NAIA Player of the Year 1971; Third-team Little All-American (1971); Cal Lutheran Athletic Hall of Fame

Sam Cvijanovich is a former linebacker in the Canadian Football League. Cvijanovich was a notable player for the Cal Lutheran Kingsmen during the 1971 NAIA Division II Football National Championship. He has been named “the hardest hitter I’ve ever coached” by head coach Bob Shoup. Nicknamed "Jawbone", Cvijanovich was six foot and 205 lbs. He was later named NAIA District III Player of the Year in both his junior and senior years at Cal Lutheran. He was later drafted to the Canadian Football League after his collegiate career and was selected as the CFL Rookie of the Year in 1974 as a middle linebacker with the Toronto Argonauts. He set a record for interceptions by a linebacker as a rookie and played three seasons for Toronto before being traded to Vancouver. He ended his 1977 season and retired due to foot injuries.

== Early life ==
Sam Cvijanovich is a graduate of Santa Clara High School in Oxnard, California. While at Santa Clara he played football, basketball, and baseball under his father Lou Cvijanovich, who coached varsity teams in all three sports.

== College career ==
Cvijanovich played college football at California Lutheran College (1970–1972), where he was a second-team all-star in 1970. He was inducted into the Cal Lutheran Alumni Association Athletic Hall of Fame in 2003.

== Professional career ==
Cvijanovich played three years with the Toronto Argonauts in the CFL (1974–1976), playing 43 games and wearing number 33. In 1974, he won the CFL's Most Outstanding Rookie Award on the strength of his 7 interceptions and 2 fumble recoveries. He later played for the Ottawa Rough Riders, and seven games for the BC Lions, in 1977.

== Personal life ==
In 1980, Sam Cvijanovich purchased a biker bar in Oxnard with his brother Steve Cvijanovich and reopened it as a sports bar called Sam's Saloon.
