= Ralph Miller (American football) =

American football player (born 1948)

No. 62
- Position: Guard

Personal information
- Born: August 13, 1948 (age 78); Hartford, Alabama
- Listed height: 6 ft 3 in (1.91 m)
- Listed weight: 260 lb (118 kg)

Career information
- College: Cal Lutheran; Alabama State

Career history
- Houston Oilers (1972–1973); Toronto Argonauts (1975)

Career statistics
- Games played: 7
- Stats at Pro Football Reference

Ralph Miller (born August 13, 1948) is an American football player. Besides being a founding member of the National Football League Players Association, Miller has played for NFL teams New Orleans Saints, the Houston Oilers, the Philadelphia Eagles, the San Diego Chargers, the New York Giants, and the San Francisco 49ers. He later served as President of the Los Angeles County Deputy Probation Officers Union since 1997. Prior to his professional football career, he was a collegiate football player for the Kingsmen team at California Lutheran University in Thousand Oaks, California. Miller migrated to California after having attended Alabama State University and became a notable player in the 1971 NAIA Division II Football National Championship. He was active in the civil rights movement in Alabama and became a mortgage banker and a Los Angeles County probation officer. He chaired the Black Student Union and the Third World Alliance at California Lutheran University, and later joined the Houston Oilers as a free agent and played five years in the National, Canadian and World Football Leagues.
