= Per Ivar Roald =

Norwegian footballer (born 1970)

Personal information
- Date of birth: 10 February 1970 (age 56)
- Position: Defender

Youth career
- Hødd

Senior career*
Years	Team	Apps	(Gls)
1987–1995	Hødd		

International career
- Norway youth
- * Club domestic league appearances and goals

Per Ivar Roald (born 10 February 1970) is a retired Norwegian football defender.

He came through the youth ranks of Hødd, where he stayed throughout the club's 1995 Tippeligaen campaign.

He was also capped for Norway at youth level.

He later entered Hødd's board of directors.

He has also played soccer for the Cal Lutheran Kingsmen in 1993. Roald, a former member of the Norwegian national youth team, led the team with nine goals and seven assists in October 1993.
