= Juaquin Hawkins =

American basketball player (born 1973)

Personal information
- Born: July 2, 1973 (age 53) Lynwood, California
- Listed height: 6 ft 7 in (2.01 m)
- Listed weight: 205 lb (93 kg)

Career information
- High school: Lynwood (Lynwood, California)
- College: Long Beach State (1993–1996)
- NBA draft: 1996: undrafted
- Playing career: 1996–2013
- Position: Small forward
- Number: 1

Career history
- 1996–1997: Hung Fu Rams
- 1998: Long Island Surf
- 1999–2000: Fort Wayne Fury
- 2000–2001: Toyota Alvark
- 2001: San Miguel Beermen
- 2001–2002: Southern California Surf
- 2002–2003: Houston Rockets
- 2003–2004: Long Beach Jam
- 2004–2005: Orange County Crush
- 2005: Long Beach Jam
- 2005: Sioux Falls Skyforce
- 2005–2006: Matsushita Electric Panasonic Kangaroos
- 2006–2007: Hitachi SunRockers
- 2007–2008: Gold Coast Blaze
- 2009–2010: Los Angeles Lightning
- 2011–2012: Los Angeles Slam
- 2012: Los Angeles Lightning
- 2012–2013: Los Angeles Slam

Career highlights
- ABA champion (2004); CBA champion (2005); IBL champion (2009)
- Stats at NBA.com
- Stats at Basketball Reference

Juaquin Juan Hawkins (born July 2, 1973) is an American former professional basketball player. He played with the Houston Rockets during the 2002–03 NBA season.

== Professional basketball career ==
After going undrafted in the 1996 NBA draft, he signed a free agent contract to play with Kobe Bryant, Nick Van Exel, Shaquille O'Neal on the Los Angeles Lakers. He was one of the last cut from the final roster. After that, he played for the Hung Fu Rams in Taiwan and the Long Island Surf of the United States Basketball League. He played with the Los Angeles Clippers during the 1998 NBA preseason and was the last player cut. He then played with the Harlem Globetrotters in 1998 and 1999. After that, he played with the Fort Wayne Fury of the Continental Basketball Association along with future Rockets teammate Moochie Norris. After that, he played with the Southern California Surf of the ABA. In 2000–01, he played for Toyota Alvark in Japan. Finally, during the 2002–03 season, he made the Houston Rockets as the second oldest rookie in the NBA during that time. He even started 10 games that year.

== Houston Rockets and other NBA teams ==
Hawkins signed with the Houston Rockets of the NBA on September 30, 2002. On November 22, 2002, he put up career highs with 14 points, 8 rebounds, and 5 assists against the Washington Wizards. He suited up all 82 games for the Rockets as they missed the playoffs by one game.
