= James Kallas =

American football player and coach (born 1928)

James Gus Kallas (born December 15, 1928, in Chicago, Illinois) is an author, theologian, football player, and football coach. He was the president of Dana College from 1978 to 1984. He was an assistant football coach and chaplain at California Lutheran College (CLC) from 1961 to 1978 and was the college’s first chair of the Religion Department. Prior to his career at CLC, he was an NFL player for the Chicago Bears. After his time at CLC, he served as president of Dana College in Blair, Nebraska, and was knighted with the Order of the Dannebrog by Margrethe II of Denmark for his work there. He was inducted into the California Lutheran Alumni Association Athletic Hall of Fame in 2007. He also helped to recruit Robert Shoup as the college’s first football coach.

Kallas was signed to play professional football by the Chicago Cardinals, and subsequently played for the Chicago Bears under George Halas. His interest in the Christian gospel led him to Luther Seminary and the Sorbonne in Paris and the University of Durham in England as both a Fulbright and Rockefeller scholar. At age 14, he was a veteran of the U.S. Navy and was attending St. Olaf College in Minnesota, majoring in Mathematics.

He was the senior pastor at Mount of Olives Church in Santa Monica, California starting in 1985. He also worked as a missionary in French Cameroon from 1955 to 1960, and has been a professor of the New Testament and philosophy at California Lutheran University.

== Literary works ==
- An Adventure in Africa: Our Years in the French Cameroun (1964)
- The Story of Paul (1966)
- A Satanward View: A Study in Pauline Theology (1966)
- Jesus and the Power of Satan (1968)
- A Layman’s Introduction to Christian Thought (1969)
- Revelation: God and Satan in the Apocalypse (1973)
- The Real Satan: From Biblical Times to the Present (1975)
- The Significance of the Synoptic Miracles: Taking the Worldview of Jesus Seriously (2010)
- Biblical Chaos: Holding Opposites Together in Tension (2012)
- The Bible Twice Denied: A Cure of the Continuing Collapse of Christian Influence (2013)
