= Toby Bailey =

American basketball player (born 1975)

Personal information
- Born: November 19, 1975 (age 50) Los Angeles, California, U.S.
- Listed height: 6 ft 6 in (1.98 m)
- Listed weight: 215 lb (98 kg)

Career information
- High school: Loyola (Los Angeles, California)
- College: UCLA (1994–1998)
- NBA draft: 1998: 2nd round, 45th overall pick
- Drafted by: Los Angeles Lakers
- Playing career: 1999–2011
- Position: Shooting guard / small forward
- Number: 12

Career history
- 1999–2000: Phoenix Suns
- 2000–2001: Los Angeles Stars
- 2001–2002: Fillattice Imola
- 2002–2003: Panionios
- 2003–2004: Aris
- 2004–2005: AEK Athens
- 2006: Telenet Oostende
- 2007: Beijing Olympians
- 2007: Santa Barbara Breakers
- 2007–2008: Köln 99ers
- 2008: Ricoh Manresa
- 2009: Artland Dragons
- 2009: Los Angeles Lightning
- 2010: Artland Dragons
- 2010: Los Angeles Lightning
- 2010–2011: EnBW Ludwigsburg

Career highlights
- Greek Cup winner (2004); All-Greek League Second Team (2004); 2× Greek All-Star Game (2004, 2005); Greek All-Star Game Slam Dunk champion (2005); Belgian League champion (2006); NCAA champion (1995); 3× First-team All-Pac-10 (1996–1998)
- Stats at NBA.com
- Stats at Basketball Reference

John Garfield "Toby" Bailey (born November 19, 1975) is an American former professional basketball player. He is currently a sports agent.

== College career ==
Bailey played four years of college basketball at UCLA, being part of the Bruins squad that won the 1995 NCAA Men's Division I Basketball Tournament. In the championship game against Arkansas, Bailey scored 26 points and had nine rebounds as a freshman. All of the team's starting lineup – Bailey, Ed O'Bannon, Tyus Edney, George Zidek, and Charles O'Bannon – later played in both the National Basketball Association and overseas. Bailey was a first-team All-Pacific-10 Conference selection in 1996, 1997, and 1998. He was voted co-most valuable player of the Bruins in 1996 and 1998.

== Professional career ==
Bailey was selected by the Los Angeles Lakers in the second round (45th overall) of the 1998 NBA draft, and played for two seasons with the Phoenix Suns, averaging 3.3 points per game in 73 regular season games.

After his NBA career, and following a brief spell in the ABA, he moved on to Europe, successively representing Fillattice Imola (Italy), Panionios BC, Aris Thessaloniki and AEK Athens (Greece), Telindus Oostende (Belgium), Köln 99ers (Germany), and Ricoh Manresa (Spain). He finished his career playing for EnBW Ludwigsburg in Ludwigsburg, Germany before retiring in 2013.

== Sports agent career ==
In 2012, Bailey and Dean Walle started a small basketball player representation firm, Sky Sports Management. They joined Rival Sports Group in 2014 as vice presidents of basketball, with president of basketball Mitchell Butler, who also played at UCLA.

== See also ==
- 1994-95 UCLA Bruins men's basketball team
