= Marty Slimak =

American baseball coach

Playing career
- 1973–1974: College of the Canyons
- 1975–1976: UC Santa Barbara

Coaching career (HC unless noted)
- 1994–2023: Cal Lutheran

Head coaching record
- Overall: 793–386–8

Accomplishments and honors

Championships
- 1 NCAA Division III (2017); 12 SCIAC regular season

Marty Slimak is American former baseball coach. He served as the head baseball coach at California Lutheran University from 1994, when he replaced Rich Hill, to 2023. During his tenure, he guided the Cal Lutheran Kingsmen baseball program to twelve conference championships, thirteen regional appearances, four World Series appearances and as of 2017, one NCAA Division III national championship. He has set a record for the most victories in school history. He is the winningest coach in CLU history and received his 700th win during his 25th season in 2018. Slimak has seen thirteen of his players drafted to the Majors. His playing days date to the 1970s when he played for former USC skipper Mike Gillespie at College of the Canyons. He also played football at the school before spending one season as a tight end on the UTEP Miners football team. Slimak then played two years for Dave Gorrie at UC Santa Barbara, where he earned his bachelor's degree. He earned his master's degree at Cal Lutheran in 1996. A Los Angeles native, he attended St. Genevieve High School.

After serving as a top assistant under head coach Rich Hill at Cal Lutheran, Slimak was named head coach in July 1993 after Hill was hired at San Francisco.
