= Gilbert Sports and Fitness Center =

Multipurpose Indoor Arena

Coordinates: 34°13′35″N 118°52′41″W

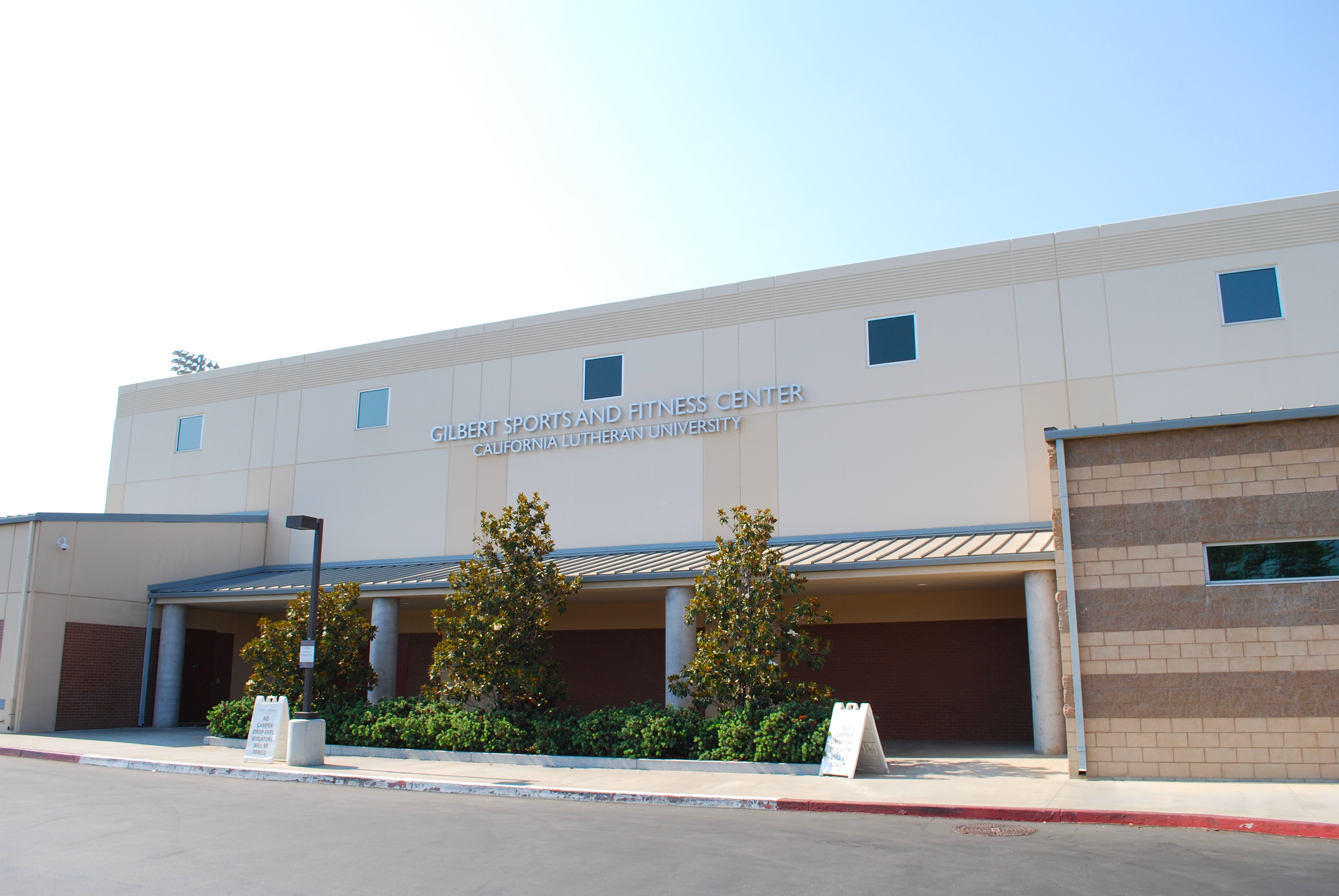

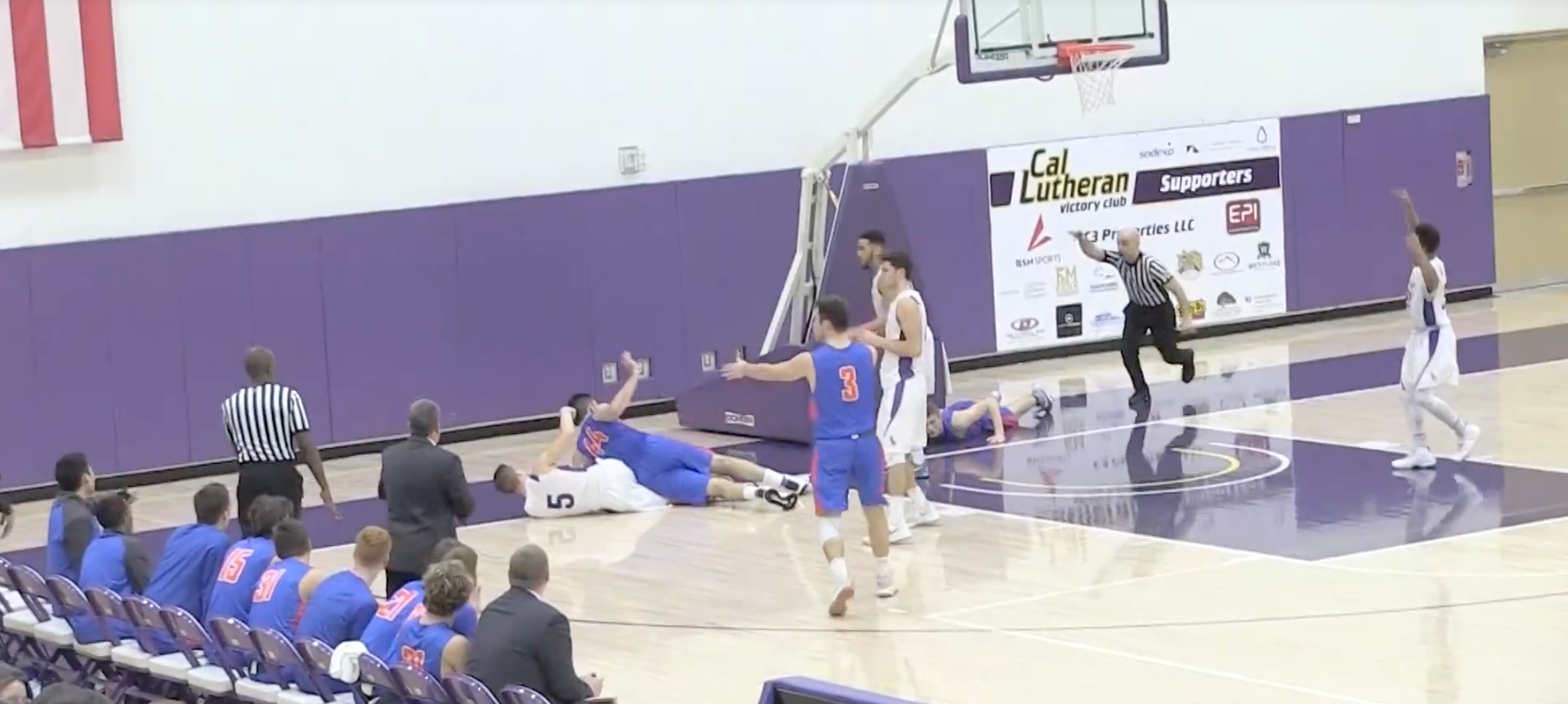
Cal Lutheran Kingsmen basketball team

The Gilbert Sports and Fitness Center is a 2,411 seat multi-purpose indoor arena on the campus of California Lutheran University, located in Thousand Oaks, Ventura County, California. It is 96,000 sq. ft.

It houses two gymnasiums, including the main 1,500-seat gym, the Lundring Events Center, classrooms and labs, Ventura County Sports Hall of Fame, a sports medicine facility, a fitness center, the CLU Alumni Association Athletic Hall of Fame, and offices for staff, faculty, and coaches.

It is the college's fitness center and hosts its indoor sports activities, as well as local-regional sporting events and music concerts.

It is named after its main donor, John "Jack" Gilbert and his wife Carol.

== Design ==
The $18 million arena opened in 2006, and was designed by architect Vincent Dyer of JDO Associates. Other CLU projects designed by JDO/Dyer include the Samuelson Aquatics Center and the CLU Facilities Building.

== Basketball venue ==
It is the home of the California Lutheran University Kingsmen basketball teams and the L.A. Lightning of the International Basketball League.

== See also ==
- Cal Lutheran Kingsmen and Regals
