= Bob Shoup =

American football player and coach (born 1932)

Biographical details
- Born: February 24, 1932; Lincoln, Nebraska, U.S.
- Education: USC

Playing career
- ?: UC Santa Barbara

Coaching career (HC unless noted)

Football
- 1956–1961: North HS (CA)
- 1962–1989: Cal Lutheran
- 2009: Carlsbad HS (CA) (assistant)

Baseball
- 1965: Cal Lutheran

Administrative career (AD unless noted)
- 1969–1977: Cal Lutheran

Head coaching record
- Overall: 185–87–6 (college football)
- Tournaments: Football; 4–4 (NAIA D-II playoffs)

Accomplishments and honors

Championships
- Football; 1 NAIA Division II (1971)

Awards
- Football; NAIA Coach of the Year (1971); Cal Lutheran Hall of Fame (2003); NAIA Award of Merit (1968); NAIA Hall of Fame (2009); NAIA Coach of the Year (1971); Ventura County Sports Hall of Fame (1992); Lutheran Coach of the Year (1972); Western Airlines Sportsman of the Year (1972); American Football Coaches Association Regional Coach of the Year (1975); NAIA Western Coach of the Year

Robert F. Shoup (born February 24, 1932) is a retired American football coach and former player. He was the head coach at California Lutheran University from 1962 to 1989, compiling a career coaching record of 185–87–6. Shoup led Cal Lutheran to the NAIA Division II Football Championship in 1971. 186 of his players would later become coaches. He also helped to bring the Dallas Cowboys NFL team to the university. He was able to spend time around the team's players and coaches, including Tom Landry, and was able to pick up techniques for his team. Landry and Shoup also put together two major events each summer: a coaching clinic that drew as many as 500 people and a charity function known as the Christian Businessmen's Club Day. He was also the head coach for the college's golf program for ten years, 1976-1986.

Shoup coached the California Lutheran College football team from 1962-1989 where he achieved 184 wins and a .662 winning percentage. Out of his 28 seasons at CLC, Shoup had only seven losing seasons overall. In those 28 seasons, the team made the playoffs in 1971, 1975, 1977, 1979, and 1982. In 1971 he led the football team to the NAIA Division II National Championship defeating Westminster College 30-14. That year he was named NAIA Coach of the Year. During his time at the college, Shoup collected fourteen NAIA District III titles and his team was listed in the top ten as having the most wins over the last fifty years. He has been named the founding father of the football program at California Lutheran. When he retired from Cal Lutheran in 1989, Shoup had 186 wins, the most among California college football coaches.

Coach Shoup was inducted into the NAIA Hall of Fame in January 2009. He was voted NAIA District III Coach of the Year for nine consecutive years and was named the NAIA Western Coach of the Year three times. In 1968 he earned the NAIA Award of Merit and in 1971 was named NAIA Coach of the Year. He is also a member of the Ventura County Sports Hall of Fame and the CLU Athletic Hall of Fame. A bronze statue of coach Shoup was dedicated by CLU in 2014 and is located at University Plaza on the CLU campus.

== Early life ==
Shoup was a part of the football team at Marshall Fundamental Junior High School in Pasadena. He later attended John Muir High School in Pasadena, California, where he won fourteen athletic letters in sports such as baseball, tennis, football, and basketball. He received an Associate Arts degree from John Muir College, Pasadena, where he was elected student body president in 1952. He earned a bachelor's degree in physical education at UC Santa Barbara, where he also played football and led the team in total offense and to the 1955 CCAA Championship. He also played for the college's baseball team. He received a master's degree in physical education from University of Southern California in 1960.

== Coaching career ==
=== North High School ===
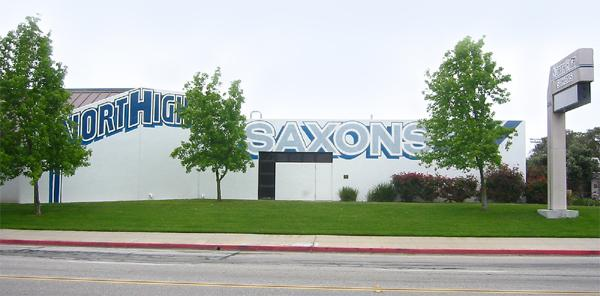
Shoup's career began at North High School

Shoup's coaching career began in 1956 at North High School in Torrance, California. He led the high school football team to six league championships and was named Coach of the Year twice. Before his recruitment to California Lutheran College, Shoup had garnered fame at Torrance High School, where he had compiled an enviable record for championships. He was also notable for his time at University of California, Santa Barbara, in the 1950s. The football team at Torrance had been described as a “local laughing stock” before Shoup's arrival, and it had gone two years since they last won a game. Two years later, the team won the league title. Having built a winning team, Shoup set about the task of building a stadium for the high school. Shoup later explained: “The administration gave me the carte blanche to put together whatever I wanted,” and continued “that stadium had everything imaginable: nice locker rooms, training rooms, coaches’ offices, lights, press box, concession stands, you name it. And we sold it out every game.” The high school team only lost four games during the next three seasons. Shoup was also a coach of Torrance’s newly established tennis team.

As Shoup was hired when North Torrance High School was a new school just starting to play football, Shoup, at age 24, helped build the football program from scratch. In 1957, Shoup was asked by the high school to move up to varsity. He accepted and soon won the first varsity game in the school’s history, against Redondo High School. The high school team hadn’t won more than two or three games in total over the preceding years, however, the team became league champions in Shoup’s first year. Within a few years, Shoup had built a championship team at North High. When Shoup was hired at California Lutheran College in 1962, he brought many former high school players with him.

=== Cal Lutheran ===
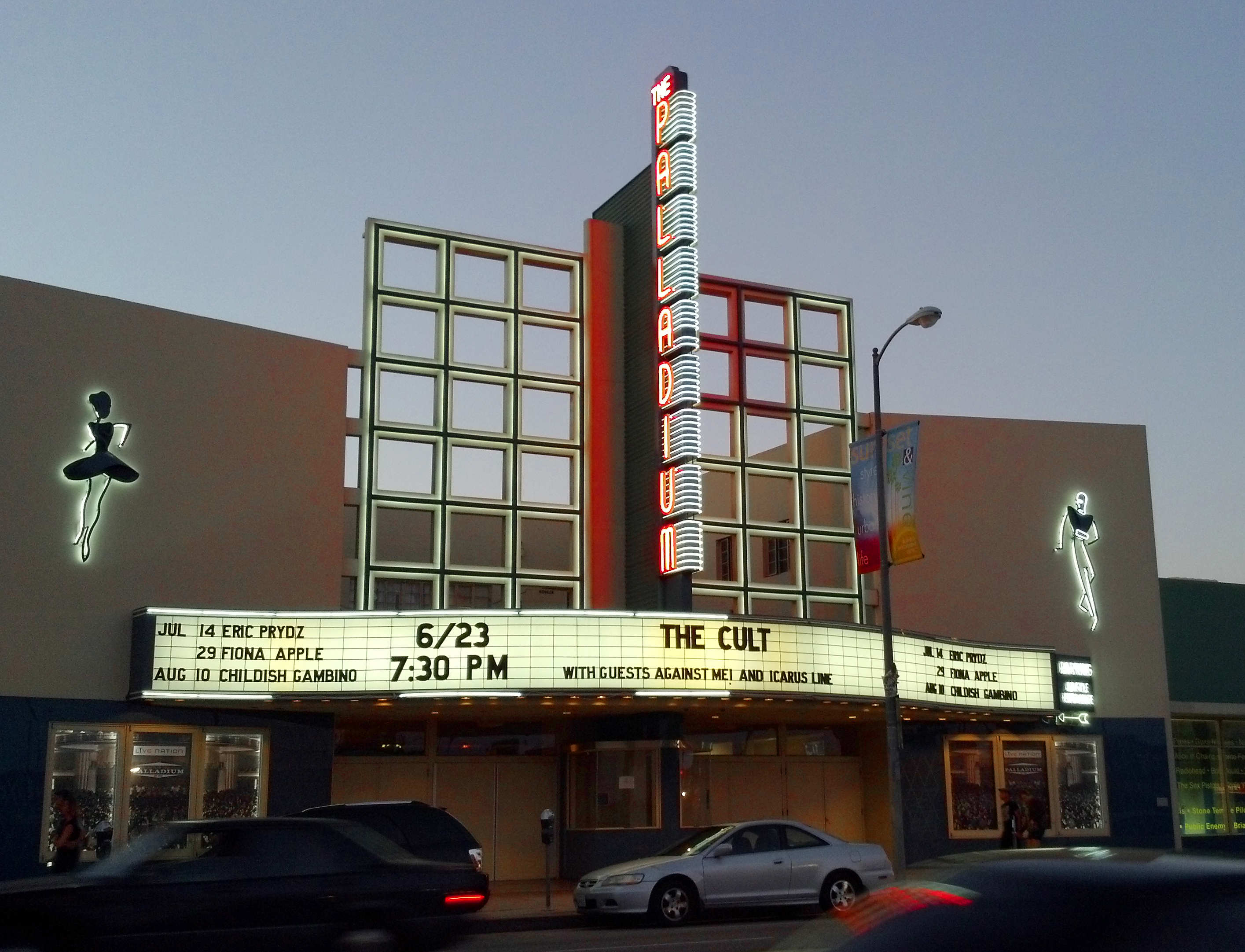
Hollywood Palladium

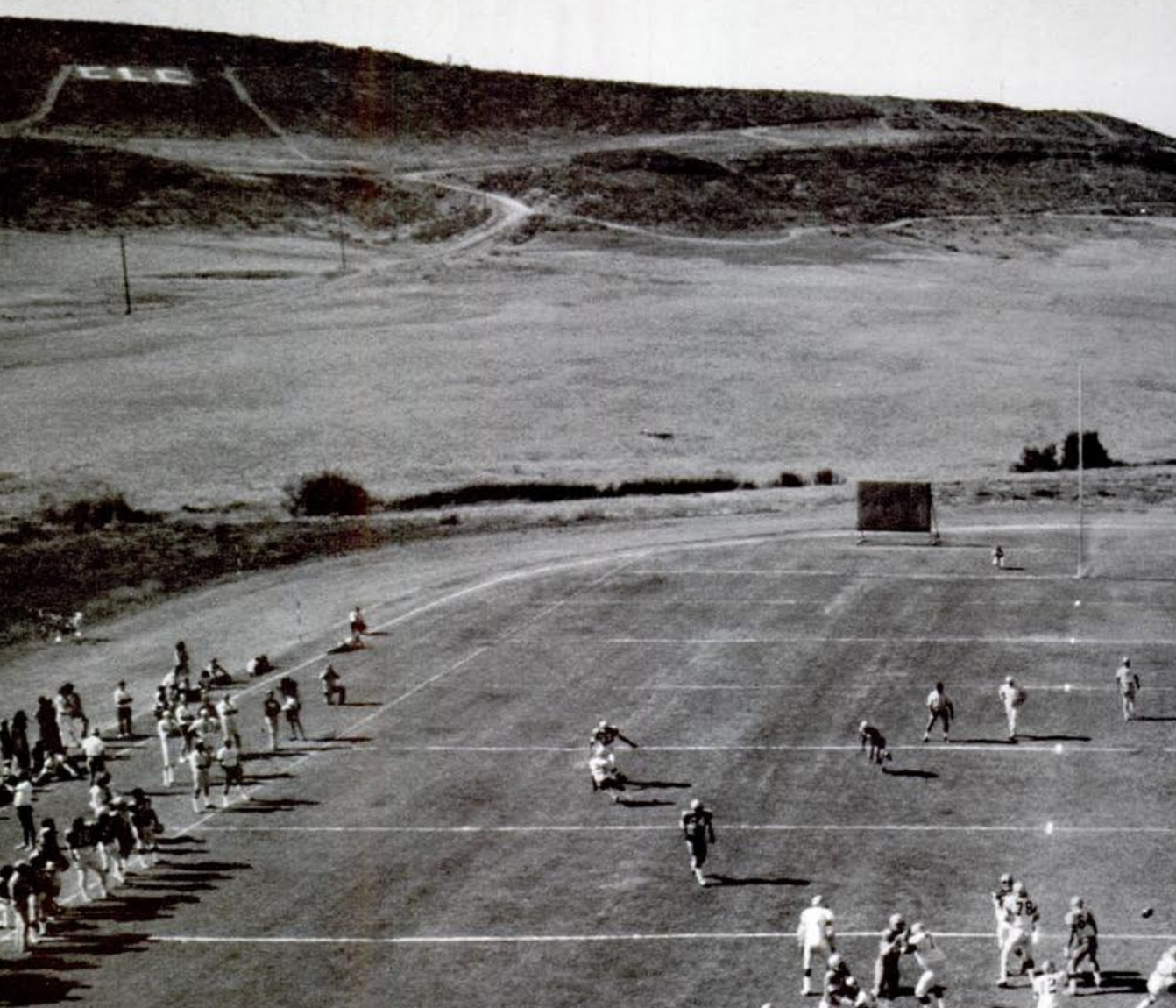
Shoup was instrumental in helping to bring the Dallas Cowboys to CLC.

In 1962, Shoup was informed by James Kallas, a former NFL player for the Chicago Bears, that the Regents at California Lutheran College had just approved a college football program. Kallas played a key role in helping to recruit Shoup as the college’s first football coach. Dr. Luther Schwich made the plans to form California Lutheran College's first football team in 1962 and selected Bob Shoup to begin the team. Shoup’s first assignment at CLC was to recruit and build a football team, develop a schedule, and secure new facilities. During the “Year of the Champions” in 1965, the team brought into fulfillment with an 8-1 record. The winning streak continued into 1966, nicknamed the “Year of the Victors”, with an 8-2 record. In 1967, the “Year of the Conquerors,” a 7-2 season, Gary Loyd emerged as the best punter in collegiate football and was named an NAIA All-American in 1968. That same year CLC also appeared for the first time in the national rankings, coming in ninth. The following year, 1969, nicknamed “Year of the Warriors,” Robbie Robison set an NAIA record with seventeen field goals, which moved the team up to seventh place in the national ratings. From an 8-1-1 record in 1970, the team moved into their greatest season the following year, when the team captured the national championship beating both Westminster College and Montana Tech in the playoffs. A celebration was held at the Hollywood Palladium in conjunction with the Dallas Cowboys, an NFL team that trained at CLC, who won the Super Bowl in January 1972. After winning the championship, coach Shoup was named NAIA Coach of the Year and Lutheran Coach of the Year. From the championship team, numerous players were drafted for professional football careers, including Brian Kelley who was drafted by the New York Giants and Sam Cvijanovich who played in the Canadian Football League. Another key player, Mike Sheppard, later became the head coach at California State University Long Beach. As of 1984, the CLU team was among the top small college teams in America, which makes Coach Robert Shoup one of the winningest coaches in the country.

In the early 1960s, Shoup was the college's football coach, took over the baseball program, was an instructor in physical education, became dean of men, and chaired the student discipline committee. He also worked in public relations, church relations, fundraising, and admissions. Following the death of Jack Siemens in 1969, Shoup also assumed the role of Athletic Director for the college. As the athletic director from 1969–1977, Bob Shoup hired Major League Baseball player Ron Stillwell as the head baseball coach in 1972. His son Rick Shoup helped his father coach the football team for six years as a volunteer and one year as a paid assistant. Shoup was also a teacher in two courses at the university: body conditioning and recreational leadership. He was also the head coach for the golf team from 1976-1986. The 1982-83 season was one of the best seasons for Cal Lutheran's golf team. The college finished 17th in the national competition in Texas. During the next season, Shoup was able to send Greg Osbourne to compete in the national competition in Michigan, where he ultimately finished fourth. In 1984, Osbourne captured the NAIA District III individual championship, picked up All-America honors, and raised the bar for the program.

After winning the 1971 national title, Shoup considered changing jobs and interviewed for jobs at Idaho State, Cal State Fullerton, Pacific Lutheran University, and Montana, but ultimately decided to remain at Cal Lutheran.

=== Carlsbad High School ===
After his career at Cal Lutheran, he worked as an assistant at Carlsbad High School for head coach Bob McAllister.

== Community work ==
Shoup was also instrumental in the construction of the Ascension Lutheran Church in Thousand Oaks, California and the Conejo Valley Recreation Department. He also helped purchase the Los Robles Golf Course in Thousand Oaks. He formed a committee to organize the Conejo Recreation and Park District. He also organized a Community Leaders Club. He has worked as a consultant for a group constructing a resort in Hawai'i. He has also chaired the Ascension Lutheran Church evangelism committee and its building committee. Other community involvements include United Way Chairman, YMCA Development Chairman, Chamber of Commerce Director, and Church President. He has also been President of the Lamplighter Foundation.

== Personal life ==
In 2001, Shoup moved from Thousand Oaks to Carlsbad, where he did coaching for the football team at Carlsbad High School. As of 2017, he resides in San Marcos, California. His wife, Helen, has worked for the financial aid office at California Lutheran University. His father, Donald, was a football coach at schools in Crete, Nebraska and later in Pasadena, California. He has also been a football coach at East Bakersfield High School.

Shoup's son, Rick, played as a wide receiver at Cal Lutheran from 1976 to 1979 and was later a football assistant at Cal Lutheran and a baseball assistant at Chaminade. From 1990 to 1992, Rick Shoup was an assistant at Thousand Oaks High School. In 1992, he was selected as a football coach for Santa Paula High School. After just one season at Santa Paula High, he resigned. He led the high school to a 3–6 record and a third-place finish in the Frontier League in 1992. Rick Shoup coached 15 years at Carlsbad High School. He was an assistant football coach at Rancho Buena Vista High School.

== Head coaching record ==
=== College football ===
Year	Team	Overall	Conference	Standing	Bowl/playoffs
Cal Lutheran Kingsmen (NAIA / NAIA Division II independent) (1962–1983)
1962	Cal Lutheran	3–4			
1963	Cal Lutheran	5–4			
1964	Cal Lutheran	6–4			
1965	Cal Lutheran	8–1			
1966	Cal Lutheran	8–2			
1967	Cal Lutheran	7–2			
1968	Cal Lutheran	9–1			
1969	Cal Lutheran	8–1			
1970	Cal Lutheran	8–1–1			
1971	Cal Lutheran	8–0–2			W NAIA Division II Championship
1972	Cal Lutheran	5–5			
1973	Cal Lutheran	6–4			
1974	Cal Lutheran	9–1			
1975	Cal Lutheran	10–1			L NAIA Division II Championship
1976	Cal Lutheran	9–1			
1977	Cal Lutheran	9–2			L NAIA Division II Championship
1978	Cal Lutheran	8–2			
1979	Cal Lutheran	7–2–1			L NAIA Division II Quarterfinal
1980	Cal Lutheran	7–2–1			
1981	Cal Lutheran	8–2			
1982	Cal Lutheran	9–2			L NAIA Division II Quarterfinal
1983	Cal Lutheran	4–6			
Cal Lutheran Kingsmen (Western Football Conference) (1984–1989)
1984	Cal Lutheran	5–4–1			
1985	Cal Lutheran	6–5	1–4	T–5th	
1986	Cal Lutheran	3–8	0–6	7th	
1987	Cal Lutheran	5–6	1–5	7th	
1988	Cal Lutheran	2–8	0–6	7th	
1989	Cal Lutheran	3–6	0–3	7th	
Cal Lutheran:		185–87–6	2–24		
Total:		185–87–6			
National championship Conference title Conference division title or championship game berth
