= Ron Stillwell =

American baseball player (1939-2016)

- Shortstop / Second baseman
- Born: December 3, 1939; Los Angeles, California, U.S.
- Died: January 25, 2016 (aged 76); Poway, California, U.S.
- Batted: Right Threw: Right

MLB debut
- July 3, 1961, for the Washington Senators

Last MLB appearance
- September 30, 1962, for the Washington Senators

MLB statistics
- Batting average: .211
- Games played: 14
- Hits: 8
- Stats at Baseball Reference

Teams
- Washington Senators (1961–1962)

Career highlights and awards
- Ventura County Sports Hall of Fame (2011); NAIA Coach of the Year (1976)

Ronald Roy Stillwell (December 3, 1939 – January 25, 2016) was an American Major League Baseball player who played parts of two seasons for the Washington Senators. A shortstop, he batted and threw right-handed, stood 5 feet 11 inches (1.80 m) tall and weighed 165 pounds (75 kg). Then, as a coach, Stillwell also helped build the baseball programs at Thousand Oaks High School, Moorpark College and California Lutheran University. As a player, he played shortstop at University of Southern California (USC) and captained its 1961 national championship team. A week after graduating, he signed a contract with Major League Baseball’s Washington Senators. His MLB career was limited to fourteen games.

Born in Los Angeles, Stillwell attended John Burroughs High School in Burbank, California and the University of Southern California, where he co-captained the national champion 1961 USC Trojans varsity baseball team. He was signed by the Senators as an amateur free agent during the 1961 season—the inaugural season of that incarnation of the Senators—and made his big league debut on July 3 against the Boston Red Sox at Griffith Stadium. Starting at shortstop in back-to-back games, both Washington victories, he collected one hit in eight total at bats, a double off Don Schwall. That was Stillwell's only MLB extra-base hit in 38 at bats and 42 plate appearances. He notched three runs batted in.

Stilwell retired after five professional seasons in 1965. He became a teacher, and was baseball coach at Thousand Oaks High School, California Lutheran University and Moorpark College. He died of cancer on January 25, 2016. His son, Kurt, had a nine-season MLB career.

== Early life ==
Stillwell attended John Burroughs High School in Burbank, where he was student body president and played both basketball and baseball. He graduated in 1957. His high school career included being selected to the All Foothill League team as a shortstop in baseball and guard in basketball.

== Playing career ==
He graduated with a BA from the University of Southern California (USC) in 1961, the same university where he received his MA in 1967. During his time as a Trojan at USC, he was awarded the Wills Hunter Award for best GPA of a USC athlete. He was an All PAC in shortstop and captained the 1961 NCAA Championship team. A week after graduation, at age 21, he signed a contract with the Washington Senators. Stillwell played parts of two seasons with the Washington Senators. His career was cut short due to a collision during a game.

== Coaching career ==
=== Thousand Oaks High School ===
He began a 25-year career in the Conejo Valley School District in 1965, coaching varsity baseball, freshman basketball and cross country at Thousand Oaks High School. He was hired in 1964 when the school still was part of the Oxnard Union High School District. He taught at Thousand Oaks High for 33 years, coaching for 25. Stillwell also taught physical education at Thousand Oaks High School for over twenty-five years.

=== California Lutheran University ===
While still a teacher at Thousand Oaks High School, Stillwell was hired by Robert Shoup and became the head baseball coach at California Lutheran University in 1972, where he remained until 1978. He had a record 139-100-1 (.581) at Cal Lutheran and was named the 1976 NAIA Coach of the Year.

=== Moorpark College ===
Stillwell was a walk-on coach at Moorpark College from 1985-1989. He resigned as baseball coach in his fifth season for Moorpark College in 1989.

== Personal life ==
Ron and his wife Jan had three children, Scott, Rod and Kurt. Kurt played nine seasons in Major League Baseball, his best being 1988 when he was selected to the American League All-Star Team. He was the second pick for the 1983 amateur draft by the Cincinnati Reds. Stillwell’s younger son, Rod, named after USC baseball coach Rod Dedeaux, played college ball at Arkansas and advanced to the College World Series in 1989. He was drafted by the Kansas City Royals.
