= Rich Rider =

American basketball coach

Rich Rider is an American former basketball coach.

He coached the men's team at California Lutheran University (CLU), with 345 wins and three SCIAC championships, and was also an assistant athletic director. He accumulated a record of 345–207 in his 22 seasons at CLU, with three conference championships and one NCAA Division III tournament appearance. His total record as head coach is 481–311 (.607). Prior to his tenure at CLU, he coached at Boise State University, the Boise School District. and Chapman University.

He retired in November 2016 after 22 years at the university.

== Career ==
Rider attended Northeast Missouri State University, where he gained undergraduate degrees in business administration (1968) and physical education (1970). He was an assistant at Utah from 1970 to 1973. From 1973 to 1982, he was the head coach at Chapman University, where he compiled a 136–104 record and earned an NCAA berth in 1978. He had a one-year tenure as an assistant at California State University, Bakersfield, and was then an assistant at Boise State University from 1983 to 1992. Rider was the athletic director in the Boise School District in Idaho when hired as head coach at CLU.

Rider achieved the second highest number of wins for the CLU basketball team in 1999 and later surpassed Don Bielke as the school's most successful basketball coach.
