= Kurt Stillwell =

American baseball player (born 1965)

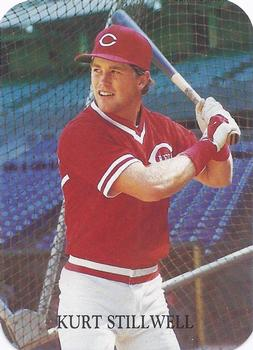
- Shortstop
- Born: June 4, 1965 (age 61); Glendale, California, U.S.
- Batted: Switch Threw: Right

MLB debut
- April 13, 1986, for the Cincinnati Reds

Last MLB appearance
- September 29, 1996, for the Texas Rangers

MLB statistics
- Batting average: .249
- Home runs: 34
- Runs batted in: 310
- Stats at Baseball Reference

Teams
- Cincinnati Reds (1986–1987); Kansas City Royals (1988–1991); San Diego Padres (1992–1993); California Angels (1993); Texas Rangers (1996)

Career highlights and awards
- All-Star (1988)

Kurt Andrew Stillwell (born June 4, 1965) is an American former Major League Baseball (MLB) infielder. He played for the Cincinnati Reds, San Diego Padres, Kansas City Royals, California Angels and Texas Rangers from 1986 to 1993 and in 1996.

== Biography ==
Stillwell was born in Glendale, California. He attended Thousand Oaks High School in Thousand Oaks, California, graduating in 1983. The Cincinnati Reds selected Stillwell with the second pick in that year's MLB draft. He opened the 1987 season at the age of 21 as the youngest non-pitcher on a NL Opening Day Roster. And in July he was moved to second base to cover for the injured Ron Oester who was lost for the season.

But he moved back to shortstop when he was traded to the Kansas City Royals in 1988, where he was selected to the American League All-Star team. On February 21, 1992, after a successful time in Kansas City, Stillwell signed with the San Diego Padres where he moved to second base. The following Season with the loss of Tony Fernandez, Stillwell was moved back to shortstop.

After leaving the League in 1993 after struggling with the Angels he made a brief comeback in '96 With the Texas Rangers, playing in 46 games.

His nickname was "Opie" after Ron Howard's character on the Andy Griffith Show.

After his playing career, he became a fishing guide and later worked as an advisor to the Scott Boras Corporation. Stillwell's father, infielder Ron Stillwell, played for the Washington Senators in 1961 and 1962.

== See also ==
- List of second-generation Major League Baseball players
