= Gerry Miller =

Gerry Miller may refer to:

- Gerry Miller, character in Kaleidoscope Man played by Ian Reddington
- Gerry Miller, leader of the development of Boeing X-53 Active Aeroelastic Wing
- Gerry Miller (educator) on National Broadband Task Force
- Gerry Miller (actor) in The Deadliest Season

== See also ==
- Jerry Miller (disambiguation)
- Gerald Miller (disambiguation)
