= Greg Osbourne =

American actor and golfer

Personal information
- Full name: Greg Osbourne
- Nationality: American

Career
- Sport: Golf
- College: California Lutheran University
- Status: Amateur

Achievements and awards
- NAIA District III Individual Champion (1984): 1984
- All-American honors (1984): 1984

Greg Osbourne is an American actor and golfer who currently serves as the Director of Golf at Cal State Bakersfield. He was the head coach for the golf program at Glendale Community College from 2008-2013. Osbourne is a PGA Pro, a member of the Professional Golfers Association, and also the head pro at Chevy Chase Country Club. He is the head pro at De Bell Golf Club in Burbank. He was the president of United States Golf Corporation in 1992-95 and the president of Wisdom Golf Inc. from 1995-97. He is an actor recurring in the role as Greg on the NBC series Las Vegas.

== Career ==
=== Cal Lutheran ===
Osbourne became the National Association of Intercollegiate Athletics District III individual champion in 1984 and received All-American honors at the Cal Lutheran golf program, raising the bar for the program. Osbourne was recruited to the college by head coach Robert Shoup in order to play as a defensive back in football, however, after a knee injury he dedicated himself to the school's golf program. He made All-Conference team all three years in college and was also voted the Most Valuable Player in 1982 and in 1984. He also led the Cal Lutheran Kingsmen to qualify for the NAIA National Golf Tournament both years. In 1984 he was NAIA District III Individual Champion where he finished fourth and earned All-America honors. He has been inducted into the Cal Lutheran Hall of Fame.

=== Glendale Community College ===
Osbourne is recognized for having built up the men's and women's golf teams at the college, leading both teams to appearances in the California Community College Athletic Association Golf Championship. He became the head coach when the golf program was reinstated in 2008 after having been suspended in 1985. In 2010 he also became the head coach for the women's team at Glendale where he had numerous successful players. Tammy Panich won the state's individual championship in 2010 and the Vaqueros finished second in the 2011 and 2012 state tournaments.

=== Cal State Bakersfield ===
Osbourne replaced coach Dave Barber on June 6, 2013, becoming the Director of Golf at the university. He is coaching both the women's and men's golf teams, which joined the Western Athletic Conference in 2014.
