= 1971 NAIA Division II football season =

American college football season

- Regular season: August–November 1971
- Postseason: November 26–December 11, 1971
- National Championship: Thousand Oaks, CA
- Champions: Cal Lutheran

The 1971 NAIA Division II football season was the 16th season of college football sponsored by the NAIA and the second season of play of the NAIA's lower division for football. The season was played from August to November 1971 and culminated in the 1971 NAIA Division II Football National Championship, played on December 11, 1971 in Thousand Oaks, California, on the campus of California Lutheran University.

The Cal Lutheran Kingsmen defeated the Westminster Titans, the defending national champion, in the championship game, 30–14, to win their first NAIA national title. The game was covered by Los Angeles Times sportswriter Jim Murray. The game was also televised nationally on NBC and nearly 10,000 spectators saw the game at Mt. Clef field. Cal Lutheran’s head coach Robert Shoup was named National Assn. of Intercollegiate Athletics Coach of the Year and Lutheran Coach of the Year following the championship win. The university held a celebration in conjunction with the Dallas Cowboys, who won Super Bowl VI, at the Hollywood Palladium.

Several Cal Lutheran players were drafted for NFL teams after the championship game, including Brian Kelley by the New York Giants and Sam Cvijanovich. Mike Sheppard and Ralph Miller were other notable Kingsmen players. While Bob Shoup was the team's head coach, Don Green was the assistant coach.

== Background and championship game ==
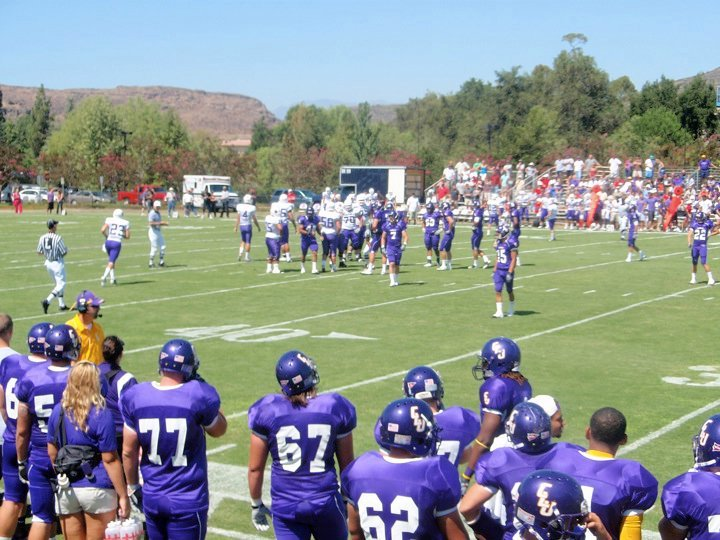
The championship game was played at Mount Clef Field.

The championship season concluded in the first week of December in 1971. CLC barely made it into the four-team national playoffs as the fourth-seeded team. After whipping Montana Tech 34-6 in the semifinals, the Kingsmen played host in the title game to Westminster, the defending NAIA champion which had ranked No. 1 all season. Montana Tech had the best running attack and the highest scorer in the U.S. Besides being the defending champs, they were undefeated in 24 games. Westminster seemed as a sure winner and CLC was the underdog. The Montana Tech team was led by running back Don Heater, who had gained 1,797 yards and scored 25 touchdowns in ten games.

For Cal Lutheran, however, a winning streak had begun in 1965 and lasted for several years, bringing in an 8-1 record in 1965 ("Year of the Champions"), 8-2 in 1966 ("Year of the Victors"), and 7-2 in 1967 ("Year of the Conquerors"). In 1968, the college appeared for the first time in the national rankings, coming in ninth. Robbie Robinson's seventeen field goals in 1969 ("Year of the Warriors") set an NAIA record and the team moved up to seventh place. Cal Lutheran headed to the championship with an 8-1 record in 1970.

The strongest personalities on the Kingsmen team have been described as Jim Baeuer, Sam Cvijanovich, Brian Kelley, and Ralph Miller. Cvijanovich was described as the hardest hitter coach Shoup ever met, while Ralph Miller (nicknamed “Magic Mountain”) was the team’s largest player at 6’4” and 260 lbs. Brian Kelly, who later enjoyed an eleven-year NFL career, was known as “the Ralph Miller of the defense.” After a field goal by Richard Kelley furthered Cal Lutheran’s lead 24-14, Brian Kelley completed the scoring by returning an interception 33 yards for a touchdown. The Cal Lutheran team had received 23 points in the forth corner and became the national champions.

== Aftermath ==
Kelley has been recognized for having helped the team win the NAIA Championship and was named the most valuable player of the game. In 1972, Kelley was selected to the NAIA All-America First Team, NAIA District 3 Defensive First Team and the All-Lutheran College Defensive First Team. He was also a wrestler and an NAIA District III Heavyweight Champion. He was inducted into the College Football Hall of Fame in May 2010. He has also been inducted into Cal Lutheran Hall of Fame. In the game, Mike Sheppard was named the defensive player of the game. Middle linebacker Sam Cvijanovich was named 1971 NAIA District III Player of the Year.

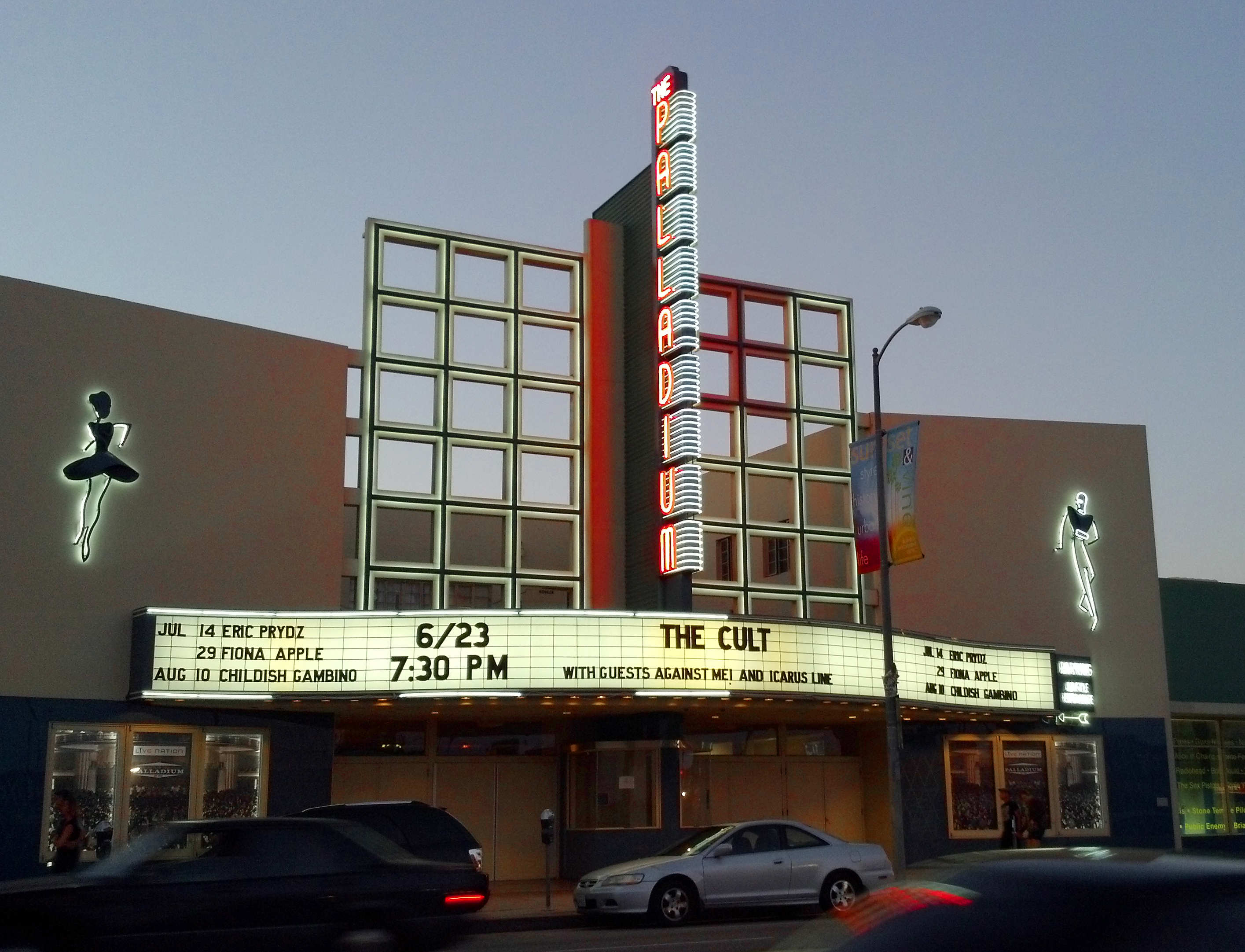
Hollywood Palladium

A banquet of the champions was held in February 1972 at the Hollywood Palladium in order to honor the Kingsmen football team and the Dallas Cowboys, an NFL team based at Cal Lutheran who won their first Super Bowl in January 1972. The NFL team had been located at CLC for nine summers prior to its Super Bowl win. There was a strong bond between the NFL team and the university, which was known as “the summer home of the Dallas Cowboys.” The Cal Lutheran coach, Bob Shoup, attended a sort of “informal summer school” for 26 years with Tom Landry as his teacher. Shoup spent much time around the NFL players, observed them play and picked up tricks. He has been described as the “de facto host” for the Dallas Cowboys at Cal Lutheran.

A Bob Shoup statue was erected on University Plaza at California Lutheran University on October 18, 2014, in homage to Shoup’s 1971 Kingsmen team.

== Notable players ==
Numerous of the CLU players were later drafted for professional teams, including Brian Kelley by the New York Giants and Sam Cvijanovich. Other key players in the game were Mike Sheppard, later receivers coach with the NFL’s Baltimore Ravens, and Ralph Miller, who later joined the Houston Oilers and played five years in the National, Canadian and World Football Leagues. Sam Cvijanovich, who later became a player in the Canadian Football League, was named NAIA Player of the Year following the championship game. While Bob Shoup was the team's head coach, Don Green was the assistant coach. Green was also the father of Doni Green, a notable player in the championship. Another notable player was Jim Bauer, the brother of Hank Bauer who also played football for the Kingsmen.

== Conference standings ==
1971 College Conference of Illinois and Wisconsin football standings
	Conf.					Overall
Team	W		L		T	W		L		T
No. 3 Carthage $^	8	–	0	–	0	9	–	0	–	1
Carroll (WI)	5	–	3	–	0	5	–	3	–	0
Augustana (IL)	5	–	3	–	0	5	–	4	–	0
Illinois Wesleyan	5	–	3	–	0	5	–	4	–	0
Millikin	4	–	4	–	0	5	–	4	–	0
Elmhurst	4	–	4	–	0	4	–	5	–	0
North Park	4	–	4	–	0	4	–	5	–	0
Wheaton (IL)	1	–	7	–	0	1	–	8	–	0
North Central (IL)	0	–	8	–	0	0	–	9	–	0
$ – Conference champion; ^ – NAIA Division II playoff participant; Rankings from NAIA Division II poll

1971 Frontier Conference football standings
	Conf.					Overall
Team	W		L		T	W		L		T
No. 4 Montana Tech $^	5	–	0	–	0	9	–	2	–	0
Rocky Mountain	2	–	1	–	2	3	–	2	–	3
Eastern Montana	3	–	2	–	0	4	–	4	–	0
Carroll (MT)	2	–	2	–	1	2	–	5	–	1
Western Montana	1	–	4	–	0	3	–	5	–	0
Northern Montana	0	–	4	–	1	0	–	7	–	2
$ – Conference champion; ^ – NAIA Division II playoff participant; Rankings from NAIA Division II poll

1971 Gateway Conference football standings
	Conf.					Overall
Team	W		L		T	W		L		T
Lakeland $	3	–	0	–	0	6	–	3	–	1
Milton	2	–	1	–	0	5	–	4	–	0
Northland	1	–	2	–	0	4	–	4	–	0
Northwestern (WI)	0	–	3	–	0	0	–	7	–	0
$ – Conference champion

1971 Heart of America Athletic Conference football standings
	Conf.					Overall
Team	W		L		T	W		L		T
No. 7 Missouri Valley $	6	–	1	–	0	7	–	3	–	0
Graceland	4	–	2	–	1	6	–	2	–	1
Ottawa	4	–	3	–	0	5	–	4	–	0
Tarkio	4	–	3	–	0	5	–	4	–	0
William Jewell	4	–	3	–	0	4	–	5	–	0
Central Methodist	2	–	5	–	0	3	–	6	–	0
College of Emporia	2	–	5	–	0	2	–	6	–	0
Baker	1	–	5	–	1	1	–	6	–	2
$ – Conference champion; Rankings from NAIA Division II poll

1971 Hoosier–Buckeye Conference football standings
	Conf.					Overall
Team	W		L		T	W		L		T
No. 9 Anderson (IN) +	5	–	1	–	0	7	–	2	–	0
No. 14 Findlay +	5	–	1	–	0	6	–	4	–	0
Earlham	3	–	3	–	0	6	–	3	–	0
Wilmington (OH)	3	–	3	–	0	6	–	3	–	0
Taylor	3	–	3	–	0	4	–	5	–	1
Defiance	2	–	4	–	0	5	–	4	–	0
Manchester (IN)	2	–	4	–	0	4	–	5	–	0
Bluffton	2	–	4	–	0	3	–	6	–	0
Hanover	2	–	4	–	0	3	–	6	–	0
+ – Conference co-champions; Rankings from NAIA Division II poll

1971 Iowa Conference football standings
	Conf.					Overall
Team	W		L		T	W		L		T
Luther $	6	–	1	–	0	8	–	1	–	0
Buena Vista	5	–	2	–	0	6	–	2	–	0
William Penn	5	–	2	–	0	6	–	3	–	0
Central (IA)	4	–	3	–	0	6	–	3	–	0
Simpson (IA)	4	–	3	–	0	5	–	4	–	0
Wartburg	3	–	4	–	0	4	–	5	–	0
Upper Iowa	0	–	6	–	1	2	–	6	–	1
Dubuque	0	–	6	–	1	1	–	7	–	1
$ – Conference champion

1971 Kansas Collegiate Athletic Conference football standings
	Conf.					Overall
Team	W		L		T	W		L		T
No. 6 Kansas Wesleyan $	8	–	0	–	0	8	–	1	–	0
Bethany (KS)	7	–	1	–	0	8	–	2	–	0
Sterling	6	–	2	–	0	7	–	2	–	0
Friends	4	–	3	–	1	4	–	4	–	1
Southwestern (KS)	3	–	5	–	0	4	–	5	–	0
McPherson	3	–	5	–	0	3	–	7	–	0
St. Mary of the Plains	2	–	5	–	1	2	–	7	–	1
Tabor	2	–	6	–	0	2	–	7	–	0
Bethel (KS)	0	–	8	–	0	0	–	9	–	0
$ – Conference champion; Rankings from NAIA Division II poll

1971 Michigan Intercollegiate Athletic Association football standings
	Conf.					Overall
Team	W		L		T	W		L		T
No. 10 Alma +	4	–	1	–	0	7	–	2	–	0
Adrian +	4	–	1	–	0	5	–	4	–	0
Olivet	2	–	2	–	1	3	–	4	–	1
Kalamazoo	2	–	3	–	0	5	–	3	–	0
Hope	2	–	3	–	0	4	–	5	–	0
Albion	0	–	4	–	1	0	–	7	–	2
+ – Conference co-champions; Rankings from NAIA Division II poll

1971 Midwest Conference football standings
	Conf.					Overall
Team	W		L		T	W		L		T
Monmouth (IL) +	7	–	1	–	0	8	–	1	–	0
St. Olaf +	7	–	1	–	0	8	–	1	–	0
Cornell (IA)	5	–	3	–	0	6	–	3	–	0
Lawrence	5	–	3	–	0	6	–	3	–	0
Knox	4	–	4	–	0	5	–	4	–	0
Ripon	4	–	4	–	0	5	–	4	–	0
Coe	2	–	6	–	0	3	–	6	–	0
Grinnell	1	–	7	–	0	2	–	8	–	0
Carleton	1	–	7	–	0	1	–	8	–	0
Beloit	0	–	0	–	0	1	–	8	–	0
+ – Conference co-champions; Beloit was allowed to compete with freshmen. Games with Beloit were not counted in the conference standings.

1971 Minnesota Intercollegiate Athletic Conference football standings
	Conf.					Overall
Team	W		L		T	W		L		T
No. 7 Saint John's (MN) +	6	–	1	–	0	8	–	1	–	0
Gustavus Adolphus +	6	–	1	–	0	6	–	4	–	0
Minnesota–Duluth	5	–	2	–	0	6	–	3	–	1
Concordia-Moorhead	4	–	3	–	0	7	–	3	–	0
Hamline	4	–	3	–	0	7	–	3	–	0
St. Thomas (MN)	2	–	5	–	0	3	–	7	–	0
Macalester	1	–	6	–	0	1	–	7	–	1
Augsburg	0	–	7	–	0	1	–	8	–	0
+ – Conference co-champions; Rankings from NAIA Division I poll

1971 Nebraska Intercollegiate Athletic Conference football standings
	Conf.					Overall
Team	W		L		T	W		L		T
Doane $	4	–	1	–	0	6	–	2	–	1
Nebraska Wesleyan	3	–	2	–	0	7	–	2	–	0
Hastings	3	–	2	–	0	5	–	3	–	0
Concordia (NE)	2	–	2	–	1	3	–	5	–	1
Dana	2	–	3	–	0	5	–	4	–	0
Midland	0	–	4	–	1	1	–	6	–	2
$ – Conference champion; ^ – NAIA Division II playoff participant

1971 North Dakota College Athletic Conference football standings
	Conf.					Overall
Team	W		L		T	W		L		T
No. 8 Minot State +	4	–	1	–	0	7	–	1	–	0
No. 13 Jamestown +	4	–	1	–	0	7	–	2	–	0
Wahpeton Science +	4	–	1	–	0	?	–	?	–	?
Mayville State	2	–	3	–	0	4	–	4	–	0
Dickinson State	1	–	4	–	0	2	–	6	–	0
Valley City State	0	–	5	–	0	2	–	6	–	0
+ – Conference co-champions; Rankings from NAIA Division II poll

1971 Northwest Conference football standings
	Conf.					Overall
Team	W		L		T	W		L		T
Linfield +	4	–	2	–	0	5	–	4	–	0
Pacific Lutheran +	4	–	2	–	0	5	–	4	–	0
Willamette +	4	–	2	–	0	5	–	4	–	0
Pacific (OR)	3	–	3	–	0	4	–	5	–	0
Lewis & Clark	2	–	4	–	0	4	–	5	–	0
Whitman	2	–	4	–	0	4	–	5	–	0
College of Idaho	2	–	4	–	0	2	–	8	–	0
Whitworth			–			2	–	7	–	0
+ – Conference co-champions

1971 Pennsylvania State Athletic Conference football standings
	Conf.					Overall
Team	W		L		T	W		L		T
East Division
West Chester xy$	5	–	0	–	0	9	–	1	–	0
East Stroudsburg	4	–	2	–	0	6	–	3	–	0
Millersville	4	–	2	–	0	6	–	3	–	0
Kutztown	4	–	2	–	0	4	–	5	–	0
Bloomsburg	2	–	4	–	0	4	–	5	–	0
Mansfield	1	–	5	–	0	3	–	6	–	0
Cheyney	0	–	5	–	0	1	–	8	–	0
West Division
No. 5 Edinboro xy	5	–	0	–	0	9	–	1	–	0
Slippery Rock	4	–	1	–	0	7	–	2	–	0
Clarion	3	–	2	–	0	6	–	3	–	0
Lock Haven	2	–	3	–	0	4	–	4	–	0
California (PA)	1	–	4	–	0	1	–	8	–	0
Shippensburg	0	–	5	–	0	2	–	6	–	0
Championship: West Chester 35, Edinboro 14
$ – Conference champion; x – Division champion/co-champions; y – Championship game participant; Rankings from NAIA Division II poll

1971 South Dakota Intercollegiate Conference football standings
	Conf.					Overall
Team	W		L		T	W		L		T
No. 8 Northern State $^	5	–	0	–	0	8	–	1	–	1
No. 12 Dakota State	4	–	2	–	0	9	–	2	–	0
South Dakota Tech	3	–	2	–	1	3	–	4	–	1
South Dakota–Springfield	3	–	3	–	0	4	–	5	–	0
Huron	2	–	2	–	2	3	–	4	–	2
Black Hills State	1	–	3	–	1	2	–	6	–	1
Dakota Wesleyan	0	–	6	–	0	2	–	7	–	0
$ – Conference champion; ^ – NAIA Division I playoff participant; Rankings from NAIA Division I poll for Northern State and NAIA Division II poll for Dakota State

1971 Southern California Intercollegiate Athletic Conference football standings
	Conf.					Overall
Team	W		L		T	W		L		T
Occidental $	3	–	1	–	0	3	–	6	–	0
Claremont-Mudd	3	–	2	–	0	7	–	2	–	0
Whittier	3	–	2	–	0	5	–	4	–	1
Pomona	3	–	2	–	0	4	–	5	–	0
La Verne	1	–	3	–	0	1	–	6	–	1
Redlands	1	–	4	–	0	2	–	8	–	0
$ – Conference champion

1971 Tri-State Conference football standings
	Conf.					Overall
Team	W		L		T	W		L		T
Northwestern (IA) $	4	–	1	–	0	6	–	3	–	0
Westmar	3	–	2	–	0	4	–	4	–	1
Concordia-St. Paul	3	–	2	–	0	4	–	5	–	0
Yankton	2	–	3	–	0	5	–	3	–	1
Bethel (MN)	1	–	4	–	0	1	–	8	–	0
Sioux Falls	0	–	5	–	0	0	–	8	–	1
$ – Conference champion

1971 NAIA Division II independents football records
	Conf.			Overall
Team	W	L	T	W		L		T
No. 1 Cal Lutheran ^		–		8	–	0	–	2
No. 2 Westminster (PA) ^		–		8	–	1	–	1
Iowa Wesleyan		–		7	–	1	–	1
Geneva		–		7	–	2	–	0
Missouri Southern		–		7	–	3	–	0
Simon Fraser		–		7	–	3	–	0
Earlham		–		6	–	3	–	0
Franklin (IN)		–		5	–	5	–	0
Oklahoma Panhandle State		–		5	–	6	–	0
Texas Lutheran		–		5	–	6	–	0
Azusa Pacific		–		4	–	5	–	0
Eureka		–		3	–	5	–	1
Grove City		–		2	–	6	–	1
Missouri Western		–		2	–	7	–	0
Waynesburg		–		2	–	7	–	0
Austin		–		1	–	8	–	0
Georgetown (KY)		–		1	–	8	–	0
^ – NAIA Division II playoff participant; Rankings from NAIA Division II poll

== Postseason ==
Semifinals; November 26–27, 1971
Montana Tech	6
Cal Lutheran*	34
Westminster (PA)	28†
Carthage*	28

Championship; December 11, 1971; Thousand Oaks, CA
Cal Lutheran*	30
Westminster (PA)	14

- † The game ended in a tie, but Westminster advanced based on having more total penetrations within the 20 yard line.

== See also ==
- 1971 NAIA Division I football season
- 1971 NCAA University Division football season
- 1971 NCAA College Division football season
