= Los Angeles Lightning =

Independent Basketball Association team (2007-2013)

- Founded: 2007
- League: IBL (2007-2010) IBA (2012)
- Team history: Los Angeles Lightning (2007-2013)
- Based in: Thousand Oaks, California
- Arena: Gilbert Sports and Fitness Center
- Colors: Blue and yellow
- Owner: Mark Harwell
- Head coach: Ron Quarterman
- Championships: 1 (2009)

The Los Angeles Lightning was a professional basketball team in the Independent Basketball Association (IBA). The Lightning was owned by Mark Harwell, an entertainment industry executive, and played at the Gilbert Sports Arena on the campus of California Lutheran University.

Founded in 2007, the Lightning first played in the International Basketball League for four years (2007–10). LA joined the IBA for the 2012 Spring season, which would also be their last.

== History ==
The Lightning captured the 2009 IBL title with an 18–5 record. Lamond Murray, a first-round pick of the Los Angeles Clippers in 1994 NBA draft, was named MVP of the IBL Finals.

The Los Angeles Lightning roster featured seven former NBA players including Lamond Murray, Jamal Sampson, Toby Bailey, Fred Vinson, Juaquin Hawkins, Darrick Martin and Tyus Edney. Former Lightning player, Fred Vinson is also an assistant coach with the NBA's New Orleans Pelicans.

In 2012, the Lightning joined the Independent Basketball Association and captured the spring season regular-season title (12-2) behind the solid play of Trayvon Lathan (26 ppg), Chris Ayer (21 ppg, 12.6 rpg) and ex-UCLA star Billy Knight (20 ppg, 48.5% on 3-pointers). The team also played the 2012 Los Angeles Summer Pro League (SPL) finishing with a 4–2 record. In 2013, they claimed the International Championship hosted by the Elite Talent Exchange of China.

== Notable players ==
- (United States) Toby Bailey 2009
- (United States) Tyus Edney 2009
- (United States) Juaquin Hawkins 2009, 2010, 2012
- (United States) Darrick Martin 2009-10
- (Mexico) Adam Parada 2009-10
