= Jerome A. Miller =

American philosopher

Jerome Aloysius Miller (born August 24, 1946) is a contemporary American philosopher and professor emeritus at Salisbury University. Miller's research interests lie in the areas of philosophy of religion and phenomenology. Miller received a B.A. in philosophy from Scranton University, and his doctorate in philosophy from Georgetown University.

== Biography ==
Miller was a professor at Salisbury University for 36 years, from 1972 until his retirement in 2008. He has written articles that have appeared in the popular and academic press in venues such as the Washingtonian, Commonweal, and Philosophy Today.

== Selected publications ==
=== Books ===
- The Way of Suffering: A Geography of Crisis (Georgetown University Press, 1988) ISBN 9780878404667
- In the Throe of Wonder: Intimations of the Sacred in a Post-Modern World (SUNY Press, 1992) ISBN 978-0-7914-0953-4
- Sobering Wisdom: Philosophical Explorations of Twelve Step Spirituality (co-author with Nicholas Plants)

=== Articles ===
- "Insight, Judgement, World: Rethinking the Ontology of Being and Time" Philosophy in the Contemporary World 5 (2) (1998): 45–53.
- "The trauma of evil and the traumatological conception of forgiveness" Continental Philosophy Review 42 (3) (2009): 401–419.
- "Intelligibility and the ethical" American Catholic Philosophical Quarterly 71 (1997): 101–112.
- "Horror and the destruction of the self" Philosophy Today 32 (4) (1988): 286–298.
- "Wonder as hinge" International Philosophical Quarterly 29 (1) (1989): 53–66.
- "Process, praxis, and transcendence" International Philosophical Quarterly 40 (3) (2000): 385–387.
- "On the way between Heidegger and Lonergan" Journal of Speculative Philosophy 2 (2) (1988): 63–88.
