= Gerald R. Miller =

American academic

- Born: October 18, 1931; Muscatine, Iowa, U.S.
- Died: May 20, 1993 (aged 61)
- Occupations: Author, academic, professor
- Known for: Communication Studies

Gerald R. Miller (October 18, 1931 – May 20, 1993) was an American professor and notable author in the field of communication studies.
