= Don Bielke =

American basketball player (1932–2023)

Personal information
- Born: May 10, 1932 Minnesota
- Died: February 2, 2023 (aged 90)
- Listed height: 6 ft 7 in (2.01 m)
- Listed weight: 240 lb (109 kg)

Career information
- High school: Wilson (Saint Paul, Minnesota)
- College: Valparaiso (1951–1953)
- NBA draft: 1954: 8th round, 67th overall pick
- Drafted by: Fort Wayne Pistons
- Playing career: 1955–1956
- Position: Center
- Number: 18

Career history

Playing
- 1955–1956: Fort Wayne Pistons

Coaching
- 1973–1982: Cal Lutheran
- Stats at NBA.com
- Stats at Basketball Reference

Donald Paul Bielke (May 10, 1932 – February 2, 2023) was an American basketball player.

He played collegiately for the Valparaiso Crusaders.

He was selected by the Fort Wayne Pistons in the 8th round (67th pick overall) of the 1954 NBA draft.

He played for the Fort Wayne Pistons (1955–56) in the NBA for 7 games.

After his NBA playing days, Bielke went on to coach basketball at California Concordia College for 16 years, and at California Lutheran University for another ten, winning over 550 games in his collegiate coaching career. He also was a professor in the kinesiology department.

Bielke was a coach and instructor at California Lutheran University for over ten years. As the head coach of the college basketball team, the winning years 1977–78 (18–17) and 1979–80 (14–3) are attributed to him. He spent over 27 years in the university's Athletic Department and was an adjunct professor and acting department chair of kinesiology. He coached for a total of 26 years and received the "Coach of the Year" awards on numerous occasions. He received the Leadership Award for the NAIA District III in 1990. Besides All-American honours and playing in the NBA, he also served as a board member with the YMCA, on the advisory board of the Boy Scouts, president of the Kiwanis Club, grand marshall of the Conejo Valley Days, and a Special Olympics coordinator. He received a bachelor's degree from Valparaiso University and a master's from San Francisco University.

== Career statistics ==
Legend
GP	Games played	GS	Games started	MPG	Minutes per game
FG%	Field goal percentage	3P%	3-point field goal percentage	FT%	Free throw percentage
RPG	Rebounds per game	APG	Assists per game	SPG	Steals per game
BPG	Blocks per game	PPG	Points per game	**Bold**	Career high

=== NBA ===
==== Regular season ====
Year	Team	GP	MPG	FG%	FT%	RPG	APG	PPG
1955–56	Fort Wayne	7	5.4	.556	.571	1.3	.1	2.0
