= Orville Dahl =

Orville Dahl (18 May 1910 - 11 September 1994) was an American academic. He was the first president of California Lutheran University in Thousand Oaks, California from 1959-1962.

A graduate of St. Olaf College, he obtained his degree with honors in 1935 and stayed at his alma mater for the next seven years to direct the college's forensics program and to serve as the coach of the college football team. He continued his studies at University of Minnesota, Columbia University and the University of California at Berkeley where he obtained a doctorate degree in education administration. During World War II, he was an executive officer and commander in the U.S. Navy. He later became Dean of Administration at University of Vermont until he became Director of Higher Education for the Evangelical Lutheran Church, which had twelve schools and colleges. He also served as secretary of the National Lutheran Educational Conference for six years, and became president of California Lutheran College (CLC) in 1959.

== Biography ==
Orville Dahl was born at Duluth in St. Louis County, Minnesota, the son of Charles and Carrie Dahl. He graduated from St. Olaf College at Northfield, Minnesota. He returned to his alma mater after graduate work at the University of Minnesota to serve as Assistant Dean of Men and Professor of Speech. He was Dean of Administration at the University of Vermont. During World War II, served as Commanding Office of Naval V-12 units in New England.

He came to Southern California in 1957 (having lived previously in Oakland with his late wife) as a representative of the Evangelical Lutheran Church. The church wanted to build a liberal arts college in California, and sent Dahl to find a good location.

In 2003, Dahl was inducted into the California Lutheran University, Hall of Fame on a meritorious basis. Orville Dahl Centrum Buildings are situated on the northwest side of campus of California Lutheran University.

His wife Leone, whom he married in 1937, was the sister of actress Dorothy Arnold. The couple had a son.
