= Thousand Oaks High School =

Public high school in California, United States

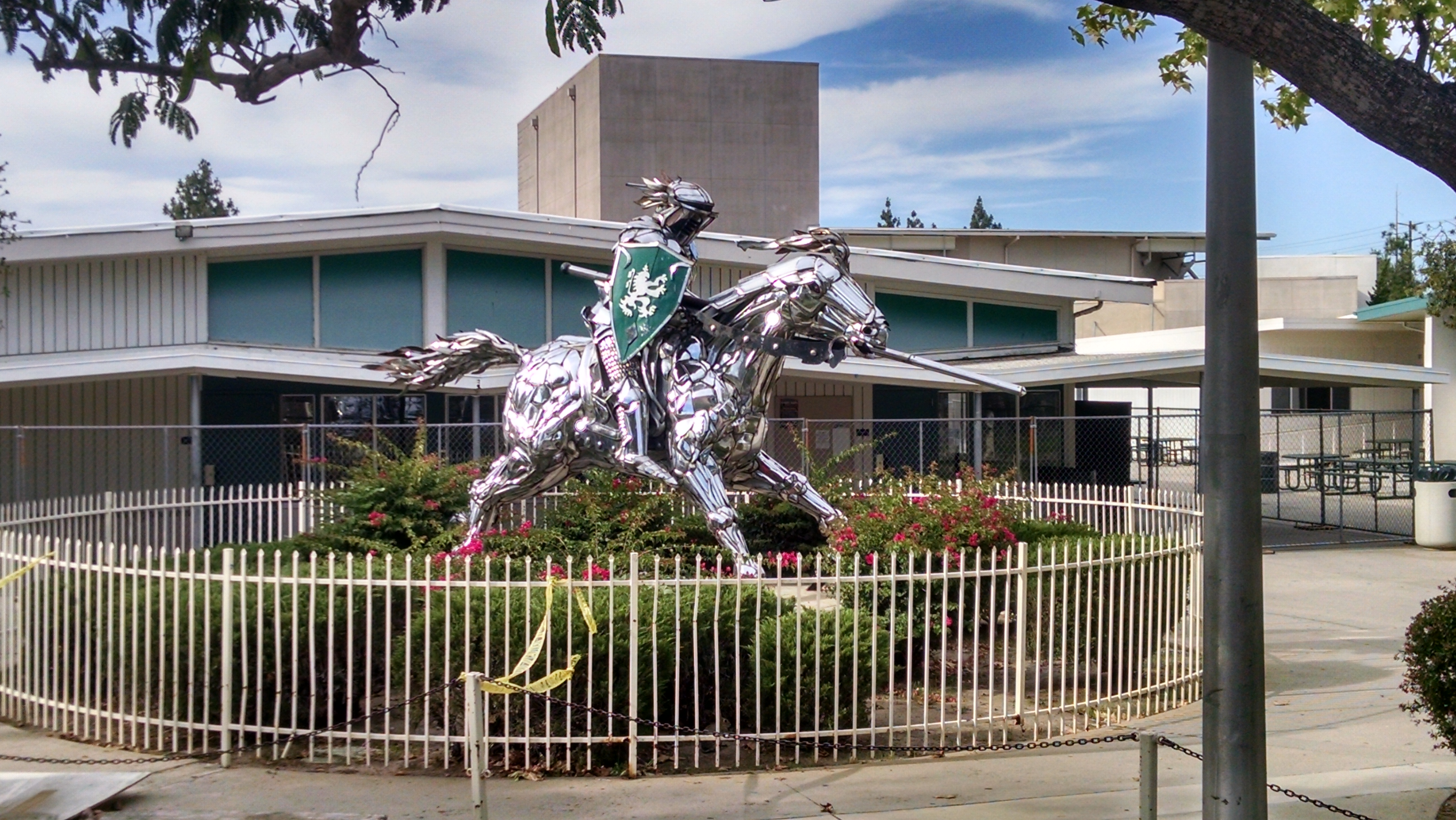
- Lancer statue in central quad

Location
- 2323 N. Moorpark Road; Thousand Oaks, California 91360; United States; 34°12′40″N 118°52′10″W

Information
- Type: Public
- Established: 1962
- School district: Conejo Valley Unified School District
- Principal: Eric Bergmann
- Faculty: 21.28
- Teaching staff: 81.21 (FTE)
- Grades: 9–12
- Enrollment: 1,728 (2023–2024)
- Campus type: Suburban
- Colors: Green and white
- Athletics conference: CIF Southern Section; Marmonte League
- Nickname: Lancers
- Rival: Newbury Park and Westlake
- Accreditation: Western Association of Schools and Colleges
- Newspaper: The Lancer
- Yearbook: The Lancer Legend
- Website: School website

Thousand Oaks High School (TOHS) is a high school in Thousand Oaks, California, United States. Established in 1962, it is part of the Conejo Valley Unified School District. It has a suburban campus with one story buildings, connected by external sidewalks, lawn areas and overhanging roofs. The campus was originally built in the 1960s, however some of the campus has undergone renovation and construction, including the addition of a Performing Arts Center in 1999. As of the 2024–25 school year, the school has an enrollment of 1,728, out of a planned capacity of 2,886; graduating classes typically number between 450 and 500.

== Demographics ==
In the 2019–20 school year, 24.9% of students received free or reduced lunch and 4.1% were classified as English learners.

Student racial make-up (2025)
Race/Ethnicity	Percentage
White	46.8%
Hispanic	39.7%
Biracial	5.6%
Asian	4.9%
Black	1.2%
Other	1.8%
Total	100%
Source: The Lancer student newspaper.

== History ==
Before Thousand Oaks High School opened, high school students in the Conejo Valley attended Oxnard High School and later Adolfo Camarillo High School, both campuses of the Oxnard Union High School District (OUHSD). In response to rapid population growth throughout the district in the postwar years, OUHSD superintendent Joseph W. Crosby began an ambitious school construction program. In 1960, voters approved a school bond measure that enabled the building of several new high school campuses. OUHSD purchased a 50.5-acre (20.4 ha) site on Moorpark Road from Janss Corporation for $245,693.45 and awarded a $2.275 million building contract to Viola Incorporated, more than $200,000 over budget. Thousand Oaks High School opened in 1962 with a student body of 895; the first principal was Tom Roser, a former social science teacher at Oxnard High School. The campus was shared with the Valley Oaks School District, educating 300 students in grades K–8 while Meadows Elementary of the Arts and Sciences was being built.

On July 1, 1974, the Conejo Valley Unified School District (CVUSD) was formed from the easternmost territory of OUHSD, merging with two elementary school districts serving the Conejo Valley. The new district took control of TOHS and Newbury Park High School, the latter which opened in 1967.

A 350-seat performing arts center opened at Thousand Oaks High School in 1999. In 2000, the campus underwent a major modernization project, addressing heating, ventilation, and air conditioning (HVAC) and ADA accessibility issues.

Thousand Oaks High School had its HVAC replaced in 2018 and the school library was renovated in 2019.

In January 2020, Schneider Electric donated an outdoor classroom shade structure and solar panels to the school. Called the Sustainable Outdoor Learning Environment (SOLE), the 30-by-30-foot (9.1 m × 9.1 m) structure seats 40 students, is powered entirely by renewable energy, and features outdoor furniture and an interactive white board. Construction concluded in April 2021.

== Academics ==
Thousand Oaks High School was named a California Gold Ribbon School in 2016–17. In the 2019–20 school year, the mean SAT score was 1206 (604 in Mathematics, 602 in Evidence Based Reading) and the mean ACT composite score was 26.4. The school has specialized programs for research (the Center for Advanced Studies and Research or "The Center"), entrepreneurship and business (ETHOS Entrepreneurship Academy or "ETHOS"), and a majors program. TOHS offers the California Biliteracy Seal to students who demonstrate a high level of proficiency in English and at least one other language.

In 2024, Ramon Moreno Jr., a Center for Advanced Studies and Research student, studied the potential of the chemical compound isonicotinamide (INAM) to extend the lifespan of yeast cells for his project. His project was conducted though the Center program. This project allowed Moreno Jr. to be named a top 40 finalist for Regeneron Science Talent Search, the nation's oldest and most prestigious science research competition for high school students, allowing him to earn up to $25,000 in scholarship money.

== Athletics ==
Thousand Oaks High School athletic teams are nicknamed the Lancers. The school is a member of the CIF Southern Section and competes in the Marmonte League. Thousand Oaks' main rival is Newbury Park High School. The student spirit section is known as the Green Hole.

The TOHS cross-country program owns three CIF State championships. The boys' team won state titles in 1993 and 1994, while the girls' team earned a championship in 1993.

The Lancers baseball team won CIF-SS championships in 2003 and 2021. En route to the 2021 title, on May 19, 2021, the team reached 31 consecutive victories dating back to the 2020 season, setting a Ventura County record and ranking ninth among all-time winning streaks in California.

In 2022, the Lancer football team secured its first 10–0 regular season in the program's 55-plus-year history. The Lancers two previous unbeaten regular seasons came in 1964 and 1989, when they were 9–0 and 9–0–1, respectively.

The Lancer Boys' swim team won the CIF-SS Division 4 championship in 2023.

In 2024, Thousand Oaks High School was recognized with the CIF-Southern Section (CIF-SS) Champion of Character award, which honors student-athletes who demonstrate a strong competitive spirit while upholding the Six Pillars of Character: trustworthiness, responsibility, respect, fairness, caring, and citizenship. The school received five awards in total, presented by CIF-SS, recognizing Principal Eric Bergmann, athletic trainer Ahmad Paden, media representative Alan Ko, the school itself, and athlete Jackson Taylor.

== Notable alumni ==
- Pete Alamar, college football coach
- Jett Bandy, Major League Baseball catcher, Los Angeles Angels and Milwaukee Brewers
- Amanda Bynes, actress
- Colbie Caillat, American singer-songwriter
- Case Cookus, professional football quarterback
- Bryan Corey, MLB player
- Chuck Crim, former MLB player
- Kahil Fennell, UT Rio Grande Valley Vaqueros men's basketball head coach
- Marion Jones, former world champion track-and-field athlete and former professional basketball player
- Max Muncy, MLB player, Athletics; 2021 first round pick
- Claire Liu, tennis player (attended)
- Chance Myers, Major League Soccer defender, Kansas City Wizards
- Sam Querrey, professional tennis player
- Michael Richards, comedian and actor, Seinfeld
- Kurt Russell, actor
- Alex Singleton, National Football League linebacker, Denver Broncos; Canadian Football League Player of the Year and Defensive Player of the Year
- Kurt Stillwell, former MLB player
- Jack Wilson, former MLB shortstop, Atlanta Braves; All-Star in 2004
- Jacob Wilson, MLB shortstop, Athletics
- Colby Wadman, National Football League punter, Denver Broncos
