= Don Green (coach) =

Donald Robert Green (February 5, 1920, Toulon, Illinois – March 22, 1995, Ventura County, California) was the architect of the track and field team at California Lutheran University. Green coached 44 students that received All-American honours during his 21 years at Cal Lutheran. He has also coached football and track at Pomona High School, leading the track team there to an 117-meet winning streak. After twenty years at Pomona, he became head coach for California Lutheran's track team, which had never won a meet. He brought the team to 98 wins in a row over the next fifteen seasons while competing in the National Association of Intercollegiate Athletics (NAIA). Besides being the head track coach at California Lutheran, he was also an assistant football coach at there for nine years and the athletic director for five years in the 1970s. He filed an age-discrimination claim after he was forced to retire in 1991.

Under his tenure at California Lutheran, men’s track and field remained a perennial winner in the NAIA. In 1981, the team won the NAIA District III championship, and the track stars annually competed in national events. 1984 was one of the college’s best years in the national championship: Matt Carney finished sixth in the decathlon and earned an All American honor with 6,269 points. In sprint relays, the team finished in sixth place with a time of 42,2 fielding a team of Ken Coakley, Roger Nelson, Maurice Hamilton and Troy Kuretich all earning All-American honours.

Green was inducted into Ventura County Sports Hall of Fame in 1992, the CIF-SS Sports Hall of Fame in 1973, and the Mt. San Antonio College Relays Hall of Fame in 1972.

One of his athletes was Bob Seagren, a gold medalist in the 1968 Olympic Games.
