= List of generic types of observances =

Generic types of observances

This is a list of generic types of observances, namely holidays and observances with similar names in different countries that do not necessarily commemorate the same thing or are observed on the same day in the same way.

One popular example is that of Independence Day, which is observed by many countries on different days of the year in commemoration of different events from one another.

== List ==
Observance	Description	Observing countries/groups
Administrative Professionals Day (also known as Administrator's Day, Secretaries Day or Admin Day)	Recognizes the work of secretaries, administrative assistants, receptionists, and other administrative support professionals.	In the United States, and Canada, it is celebrated annually on the Wednesday of the last full week of April.; In South Africa, it is celebrated annually on the first Wednesday of September (as National Secretaries Day).; In Brazil, it is celebrated on September 30 (as Dia do Administrador).
Arbor Day (also known as Tree Planting Day)	A day where individuals and groups are encouraged to plant trees.	Multiple countries around the world on varying days of the year; In Japan, the similarly themed Greenery Day is celebrated on May 4.; Pakistan celebrates National Tree Plantation Day annually on August 18.; In South Korea, the day is celebrated on April 5 as Singmogil.
Bird Day	Commemorative date celebrating birds and their conservation.	Multiple countries around the world on varying days of the year.; As of 2006, the United Nations commemorates World Migratory Bird Day on the second weekend of May every year.
Children's Day	Commemorative date celebrated in honor of children.	Multiple countries around the world on varying days of the year.; International Day of the African Child is observed on June 16.; The United Nations celebrates World Children's Day on November 20.; In India, Children's Day is celebrated on November 14.; In Japan, Children's Day is celebrated on May 5.
Discovery Day	A date commemorating the discovery of land, gold, and other significant national discoveries.	
Engineer's Day	Commemorative date celebrating engineers.	UNESCO celebrates World Engineering Day for Sustainable Development on March 4.
Father's Day	A date commemorating fathers and fatherhood.	
Food Day	A date celebrating a particular food.	Celebrated by multiple countries and groups around the world on varying days of the year. See list of food days.; The United Nations marks World Food Day on October 16.
Friendship Day (also known as Friend's Day)	A day celebrating friendship.	In Ecuador, Mexico, Venezuela, Finland, Estonia and the Dominican Republic, it is celebrated on February 14.; In South Africa and Singapore, it is celebrated in April.; In Ukraine, it is celebrated on June 9.; In Argentina, Bolivia, Brazil, Pakistan, Paraguay, Peru, Spain, and Uruguay, it is celebrated in July (as El dia del Amigo for some).; In India, it is celebrated on the first Sunday in the month of August.
Heritage Day	A day commemorating national, regional, or cultural heritage, or particular aspects thereof,	In Canada: Heritage Day in Alberta falls on the first Monday in August.; Nova Scotia Heritage Day takes place on the third Monday in February in Nova Scotia; Yukon Heritage Day is observed in February in the Yukon; China's Cultural Heritage Day; European Heritage Days is observed in various locations in Europe; Finnish Swedish Heritage Day is a flag day in Finland; Heritage Day in South Africa; In the United States: Native American Heritage Day; Heritage Day in Easton, Pennsylvania; Heritage Days is an annual three-day street festival held in Rogersville, Tennessee, in October; Heritage Open Days, a weekend in the United Kingdom
Indian Arrival Day	Commemorating the arrival of people from the Indian subcontinent to their respective nations as indentured labourers brought by European colonial authorities and their agents.	
Inventor's Day	A day recognizing the contributions of certain inventors.	
Labour Day	Celebrating the achievements of workers.	
Maritime Day		
Mother's Day	A date commemorating mothers and motherhood.	
Movable feast		
National Grandparents Day		
National Sports Day		
New Year	A date marking the beginning of a calendar year, typically categorized between lunar or lunisolar new years and solar new years.	In the Gregorian calendar, the New Year begins on January 1st.
Parents' Day		
Public holiday		
King's/Queen's Official Birthday	The selected day in most Commonwealth realms on which the birthday of the monarch is officially celebrated in those countries. It does not necessarily correspond to the date of the monarch's actual birth.	
Ratification Day		
Spring break	Recess in early spring at universities and schools.	
Spring Day		
Teachers' Day		
Thanksgiving		
Youth Day		

== Patriotic and military-related observances ==
Air Force Day	A day honouring countries' respective air forces.	
Armed Forces Day (also known as Defenders Day)	A day honouring countries' respective military forces. Some countries commemorate different days for the individual branches of their armed forces (army, navy, air force, etc.). (Not to be confused with Veterans/Armistice Day.)	Multiple countries around the world on varying days of the year.; In Azerbaijan, the Day of the Armed Forces of Azerbaijan is celebrated annually on June 26.; In Cuba, the Day of the Cuban Armed Forces is celebrated annually on December 2.; Nigeria celebrates Armed Forces Remembrance Day (AFRD) annually on January 15 as a public holiday.
Army Day	Commemorative date honouring a country's army.	
Constitution Day	Holiday honoring a country's constitution.	
Dominion Day	A former holiday commemorating the granting of certain countries Dominion status in the British Empire.	Formerly celebrated in the two countries that received "Dominion" status: Canada (in French as Fête du Dominion), and the Dominion of New Zealand.
Flag Day	A date celebrating a historical flag-related event, such as the adoption of a country's flag.	
Heroes' Day	A date commemorating a national hero or heroes.	
Martyrs' Day		
Navy Day	Commemorative date honouring a country's navy.	
Remembrance Day (also known as Veterans Day; formerly Armistice Day)		
Victory Day		

=== Observances related to sovereignty and freedom ===
The meaning of an Emancipation Day, Freedom Day, Independence Day, and Liberation Day can vary, but in general they are celebrated in various countries in commemoration of a historical event where a nation, state, or group of people achieved sovereignty, freedom, or some other form of independence (such as from military occupation or imprisonment).

Along with Independence Day, a Foundation Day and Republic Day commemorate the establishment of a nation or state.

Emancipation Day	Holiday to celebrate emancipation of enslaved people, particularly those of African descent.	Primarily celebrated by former European colonies in North America and the Caribbean.; In Canada and much of the formerly British territories in the Caribbean, it is marked on August 1.; In the United States, Juneteenth is a federal holiday commemorated on June 19.
Independence Day	A date commemorating the anniversary of a nation's independence or statehood.	
Liberation Day	A date commemorating the liberation of a place. Similar to an independence day, liberation days differ in that they typically mark either a revolution, the fall of a dictatorship, or the end of an occupation by another state, thereby differing from original independence day or creation of statehood.	Similarly, Sikhs celebrate Bandi Chhor Divas, the 'Day of Liberation'.
National Day	A day commemorating the statehood or nationhood of a state or its people. It may be the date of independence, of becoming a republic, of becoming a federation, or a significant date for a patron saint or a ruler.	
Revolution Day	Commemorating an important event in a country's history, usually the beginning or turning point in a revolution that led to significant political change.	
Foundation Day	A date celebrating the founding of a nation, state or a creation of a military unit.	
Republic Day		

==== Freedom Day ====
- Freedom Day in Belarus is observed on March 25 to commemorate the anniversary of the establishment of the Belarusian People's Republic in 1918.
- Freedom Day in Equatorial Guinea marks the date on August 3, 1979, when Teodoro Obiang deposed the dictator Macías Nguema.
- Freedom Day in Malawi is observed on June 14 to commemorate the first free election in Malawi in 1994.
- Freedom Day in Malta is observed on March 31 to commemorate the anniversary of the withdrawal of British troops from Malta, 1979.
- Freedom Day in Portugal is observed on April 25 to commemorate the anniversary of Carnation Revolution in 1974.
- Freedom Day in South Africa is a public holiday observed on April 27 to commemorate the first general election in South Africa after the end of apartheid in 1994.
- Freedom Day in Ukraine — Observed on January 22 as the anniversary of the signing of the Act Zluky by the Ukrainian People's Republic and the West Ukrainian People's Republic in 1919.
- World Freedom Day — Observed in Taiwan and South Korea on January 23 to mark the return of ex-communist war prisoners of the Korean War.

In the United States, there are:

- National Religious Freedom Day, observed on January 16 to commemorate the adoption of Thomas Jefferson's landmark Virginia Statute for Religious Freedom in 1786.
- National Freedom Day, observed on February 1 to honor the signing by Abraham Lincoln of a joint House and Senate resolution that later became the 13th Amendment to the U.S. Constitution.
- World Freedom Day (US), observed on November 9 to commemorate the fall of the Berlin Wall in 1989.

=== Unification and unity days ===
Various countries and communities celebrate a National Unity Day, Union Day, or Unification Day.

- National Unity Day in Belarus — September 17
- Unification Day in Bulgaria — September 6
- Unity Day in Burundi — February 5
- Unification Day in Cameroon
- National Unity Day in Georgia — April 9
- German Unity Day — October 3
- National Unity Day in Hungary — June 4
- National Unity Day in India — October 31
- Anniversary of the Unification of Italy
- Kazakhstan People's Unity Day — May 1
- Union Day in Myanmar
- Great Union Day in Romania — December 1
- Unity Day in Russia — November 4
- Unity Day in Tajikistan — June 27
- Union Day in Tanzania — April 26, commemorating the unification of Zanzibar and Tanganyika in 1964.
- Unification Day in Ukraine — January 22
- Unity Day in the United States — in October
- Unity Day in Vanuatu — November 29
- Unity Day in Yemen — May 22
- Unity Day in Zambia — on the first Tuesday of July
- Unity Day in Zimbabwe — December 22
- Unity Day in Leeds, England — early August
- Unity Day in Philadelphia, USA — in August

== See also ==
- Lists of holidays
