= Heritage =

Heritage is anything that preserves history:

== History and society ==
- Common heritage of humanity
- Natural heritage
- Cultural heritage
- Heritage site
- Heritage asset
- Heritage language

== Biology ==
- Heredity, biological inheritance of physical characteristics
- Kinship, the relationship between entities that share a genealogical origin

== Arts and media ==
=== Music ===
- Heritage (Lionel Loueke album), 2012
- Heritage (Earth, Wind & Fire album), 1990
- Heritage (Eddie Henderson album), 1976
- Heritage (Opeth album), 2011, and the title song
- Heritage Records (England), a British independent record label
- "Heritage" (song), a 1990 song by Earth, Wind & Fire

=== Other uses in arts and media ===
- Heritage (1919), Vita Sackville-West's first novel
- Heritage (1935 film), Australian film directed by Charles Chauvel
- Heritage (1984 film), Slovenian film directed by Matjaž Klopčič
- Heritage (2019 film), Cameroonian film by Yolande Welimoum
- Heritage (2025 film), Iranian film by Mir Mohammad Najafi
- Heritage (novel), 2002 Doctor Who novel
- "Heritage" (The Littlest Hobo), a 1979 television episode
- Heritage (sculpture), a 1935 sculpture by James Earle Fraser

== Organizations ==
=== Retirement communities for the elderly ===
- Heritage on the Marina, see San Francisco Ladies Protection and Relief Society

=== Political parties ===
- Heritage Party (disambiguation)

=== Schools ===
- Heritage Academy (disambiguation)
- Heritage Christian University
- Heritage College (disambiguation)
- Heritage School (disambiguation)
- Heritage High School (disambiguation)
- Heritage Institute of Technology, Kolkata
- American Heritage School (disambiguation)
- Christian Heritage School (disambiguation)

=== Think tanks ===
- Heritage Foundation

== People with the surname ==
- John Heritage, (born 1956), American sociologist
- Peter Heritage (born 1960), English footballer
- Steve Heritage, member of the American grindcore band Assück

== Other uses ==
- Ulmus parvifolia 'Zettler', a Chinese Elm cultivar sold under the marketing name Heritage

== See also ==
- List of heritage registers
- The Heritage (disambiguation)
- World Heritage Site
- English Heritage
- The Heritage Foundation
- Heritage Auctions
- Heritage Day (disambiguation)
- Heritage Foundation of Newfoundland and Labrador
- Heritage tourism
- Heritage Foods
- Heritage Great Britain PLC
- Heritage Singers, American gospel group
- Heritage (restaurant), a Michelin-starred restaurant in Long Beach, California
