= Heritage College =

Heritage College may refer to:

- Heritage College (Gatineau) in Gatineau, Quebec
- Heritage College (Calgary) in Calgary, Alberta
- Heritage College, a trade school in Las Vegas, Nevada; now a campus of Brightwood College
- Heritage Colleges (Australia) a group of Christadelphian schools in Australia

- Heritage College, Perth, Christadelphian school in Perth, Western Australia

- Heritage University, formerly Heritage College, in Toppenish, Washington
- Heritage College & Seminary in Cambridge, Ontario

== See also ==
- Heritage (disambiguation)
- Heritage School (disambiguation)
- Heritage High School (disambiguation)
- American Heritage School (disambiguation)
- Christian Heritage School (disambiguation)
- Heritage Academy (disambiguation)
