= Heritage School =

Heritage School or The Heritage School may refer to:

- Heritage School, Cambridge, an independent day school in Cambridge, Cambridgeshire, England
- The Heritage School, Kolkata, a private day & boarding school in Kasba, Kolkata, West Bengal, India
- The Heritage School (Newnan, Georgia), a private day school in Newnan, Georgia, U.S.
- Heritage School System, an English-medium day school in Lahore, Punjab, Pakistan
- The Heritage Private School, a British international school in Limassol, Limassol District, Cyprus
- Chailey Heritage School, North Chailey, East Sussex, England

== See also ==
- American Heritage School (disambiguation)
- Christian Heritage School (disambiguation)
- Heritage (disambiguation)
- Heritage Academy (disambiguation)
- Heritage Christian School (disambiguation)
- Heritage College (disambiguation)
- Heritage High School (disambiguation)
