= Unity Day =

National Unity Day, Union Day, Unification Day may refer to:

== National unification ==
Alphabetic by country.

- National Unity Day (Belarus), a holiday in Belarus on September 17
- Unification Day (Bulgaria), a holiday in Bulgaria on September 6
- Unity Day (Burundi), a holiday in Burundi on February 5
- National Unity Day, a holiday in Georgia on April 9
- National Unity Day, a holiday in Hungary on June 4
- German Unity Day, a holiday in Germany on October 3
- National Unity Day (India), a holiday in India on October 31
- Kazakhstan People's Unity Day, a holiday in Kazakhstan on May 1
- Unity Day (Morocco), a holiday in Morocco on October 31
- Great Union Day, a holiday in Romania on December 1
- Unity Day (Russia), a holiday in Russia on November 4
- Unity Day (Tajikistan), a holiday in Tajikistan on June 27
- Day of Unity of Ukraine, a holiday in Ukraine on January 22
- Unity Day (Vanuatu), a holiday in Vanuatu on November 29
- Unity Day (Yemen), a holiday in Yemen on May 22
- Unity Day (Zambia), a holiday in Zambia on the day after Heroes' Day
- Unity Day (Zimbabwe), a holiday in Zimbabwe on December 22

== Community unity celebrations ==
- Unity Day (Leeds), a free open air festival in Leeds in early August
- Unity Day (Philadelphia), a celebration in August in Philadelphia

== Others ==
- Unity Day (United States), a holiday in the United States in October, as part of National Bullying Prevention Awareness Month

== See also ==
- National day
