= Christian Heritage =

Christian Heritage can refer to:

- Christian Heritage Party of Canada, a political party.
- Christian Heritage New Zealand, a defunct New Zealand political party.
- Christian Heritage School (disambiguation), the name of several different private schools in the United States.
