= Christian Heritage School =

Christian Heritage School is the name of several schools in the United States:

- Christian Heritage Schools (Texas), in San Antonio, Texas
- Christian Heritage School (Steamboat Springs, Colorado), in Steamboat Springs, Colorado
- Christian Heritage School (Trumbull, Connecticut), in Trumbull, Connecticut
- Christian Heritage School (Dalton, Georgia), in Dalton, Georgia
- Christian Heritage School (Tyler, Texas), in Tyler, Texas
- Christian Heritage School (Washington), in Edwall, Washington
- Christian Heritage School (Longview, Texas), in Longview, Texas

== See also ==
- Heritage Christian School (disambiguation)
- Heritage (disambiguation)
- Heritage School (disambiguation)
- Heritage High School (disambiguation)
- American Heritage School (disambiguation)
- Heritage Academy (disambiguation)
- Heritage College (disambiguation)
