= American Heritage =

American Heritage may refer to:

- American Heritage (magazine)
- American Heritage (ship), a riverboat previously known as Queen of the Mississippi
- The American Heritage Dictionary of the English Language
- American Heritage Rivers
- American Heritage School (disambiguation)

== See also ==
- National Register of Historic Places in the US
- World Heritage Site
- American Heritage Girls
