= Heritage Christian School =

Heritage Christian School can refer to:

Australia

- Heritage Christian School (Port Macquarie) in New South Wales, Australia, and its smaller annex in Kempsey

Canada

- Heritage Christian School (Jordan) in Jordan, Ontario

United States

- Heritage Christian School in Los Angeles, California
- Heritage Christian School (Anchorage) in Anchorage, Alaska
- Heritage Christian School (San Diego) in San Diego, California
- Heritage Christian School in Fort Collins, Colorado
- Heritage Christian School (Florida) in Kissimmee, Florida
- Heritage Christian School (Indianapolis) in Indianapolis, Indiana
- Heritage Christian School (Iowa) in North Liberty, Iowa
- Heritage Christian School (Montana) in Bozeman, Montana
- Heritage Christian School (Canton, Ohio) in Canton, Ohio
- Heritage Christian School (Cleveland, Ohio) in Cleveland, Ohio
- Heritage Christian School (Findlay, Ohio) in Findlay, Ohio
- Heritage Christian School (Oregon) in Hillsboro, Oregon
- Heritage Christian School (Virginia) in Woodbridge, Virginia
- Heritage Christian School (Milwaukee) in Milwaukee, Wisconsin
- Heritage Christian School (Wyoming) in Gilette, Wyoming

== See also ==
- Christian Heritage School (disambiguation)
