= Cory Undlin =

American football player and coach (born 1971)

Houston Texans
- Title: Defensive passing game coordinator

Personal information
- Born: June 29, 1971 (age 55); St. Cloud, Minnesota, U.S.

Career information
- Position: Safety
- College: Cal Lutheran (1990–1994)

Career history
- Cal Lutheran (1998–2001); Linebackers coach (1998–1999); Defensive coordinator (2000–2001); Fresno State (2002–2003) Graduate assistant; New England Patriots (2004) Defensive coaching assistant; Cleveland Browns (2005–2008); Defensive quality control coach 2005–2006); Assistant special teams coach (2007); Defensive backs coach (2008); Jacksonville Jaguars (2009–2011); Defensive assistant (2009); Defensive backs coach (2010–2011); Denver Broncos (2012–2014); Defensive quality control coach (2012); Defensive backs coach (2013–2014); Philadelphia Eagles (2015–2019) Defensive backs coach; Detroit Lions (2020) Defensive coordinator; San Francisco 49ers (2021–2022) Pass game specialist & secondary coach; Houston Texans (2023–present) Defensive passing game coordinator

Awards and highlights
- 2× Super Bowl champion (XXXIX, LII)
- Coaching profile at Pro Football Reference

Cory Undlin (born June 29, 1971) is an American professional football coach who is the defensive passing game coordinator for the Houston Texans of the National Football League (NFL). He previously served as the defensive coordinator for the Detroit Lions in 2020 and also served as an assistant coach for the Philadelphia Eagles, Denver Broncos, Jacksonville Jaguars, Cleveland Browns, New England Patriots and San Francisco 49ers.

== Playing career ==
Undlin attended California Lutheran University, where he played football as a safety from 1990 to 1994. He had the distinction of being named second-team All-Southern California Intercollegiate Athletic Conference honors in 1993. At Cal Lutheran, he was a teammate and roommate of Ben McEnroe.

== Coaching career ==
=== College ===
Undlin began his coaching career at his alma mater California Lutheran as a linebackers coach from 1998 to 1999. He was promoted to defensive coordinator in 2000, a position he held through 2001, when he moved to Fresno State University. He spent two seasons in 2002 and 2003 as a graduate assistant at Fresno State under head coach Pat Hill, a former assistant coach with the Cleveland Browns under Bill Belichick.

=== New England Patriots ===
In 2004, Undlin joined Belichick as a defensive coaching assistant with the New England Patriots. He was part of the Patriots staff when they won Super Bowl XXXIX.

=== Cleveland Browns ===
In 2005, Undlin was hired by the Cleveland Browns as a defensive assistant under head coach Romeo Crennel. In 2007, Undlin was promoted to secondary coach and assistant special teams coach. In 2008, Undlin was promoted to defensive backs coach.

=== Jacksonville Jaguars ===
In 2009, Undlin moved to the Jacksonville Jaguars as a defensive assistant following Crennel's firing in Cleveland. He was promoted to defensive backs coach in 2010, but was fired along with the rest of the staff after the 2011 season.

=== Denver Broncos ===
In 2012, he was hired as a defensive quality control coach for the Denver Broncos, and he was promoted to defensive backs coach in 2013.

=== Philadelphia Eagles ===
In January 2015, Undlin was hired by the Philadelphia Eagles as their defensive backs coach. He was retained as the defensive backs coach for the Eagles on January 20, 2016. On February 4, 2018, Undlin was part of the Philadelphia Eagles coaching staff that defeated the New England Patriots, 41–33, in Super Bowl LII.

=== Detroit Lions ===
On January 13, 2020, Undlin was hired by the Detroit Lions as their defensive coordinator under head coach Matt Patricia. He missed the team's week 16 game against the Tampa Bay Buccaneers due to COVID-19 protocols. He was fired following the season.

During the offseason, it was reported that Philadelphia Eagles head coach Doug Pederson sought to hire Undlin as a potential defensive coordinator, along with other staff changes following the team's disappointing 2020 season. However, the Eagles fired Pederson.

=== San Francisco 49ers ===
On February 11, 2021, Undlin was hired by the San Francisco 49ers as their pass game specialist and secondary coach under head coach Kyle Shanahan.

=== Houston Texans ===
On February 14, 2023, Undlin was hired by the Houston Texans as their defensive passing game coordinator under head coach DeMeco Ryans.
