= Ho Chi Minh City Drone Show 2025 =

The Ho Chi Minh City Drone Show 2025 was a drone show that took place from 8:30 PM to 8:45 PM on April 30, 2025 at Saigon Riverside Park, Ho Chi Minh City, Vietnam, as part of a large-scale cultural and artistic program series themed "Colors of Uncle Ho's City", held on the occasion of the 50th anniversary of the Liberation of the South and National Reunification Day. However, due to technical problems, many drones lost signal and fell into the audience area, forcing the program to stop to ensure safety.

The event was organized by the Ho Chi Minh City Department of Culture and Sports and the Ho Chi Minh City People's Committee. In addition, the event was also sponsored by Vietnam Payment Solution Joint Stock Company (VNPay). The performance was performed by DAMODA, a company specializing in drone light performance technology from China. This is also the company that held Guinness World Records title with a performance of 10,200 drones in Shenzhen, China. The performance in Vietnam was prepared by DAMODA with 10,500 drones, which means breaking the previous record. However, because the incident was not worth mentioning, the Guinness record this time was not recognized until days later. This incident raised concerns about safety and caused many mixed reactions from the public.

== Background ==
2025 marks the 50th anniversary of the Liberation of the South and National Reunification Day (April 30, 1975 - April 30, 2025), an important milestone in the modern history of Vietnam. In order to pay tribute to the previous generation, while at the same time arousing the national spirit and introducing the image of a modern, dynamic and integrated city, the Ho Chi Minh City People's Committee together with the Department of Culture and Sports of Ho Chi Minh City has directed the organization of a series of special cultural and artistic programs with the theme of Uncle Ho's City Colors. This is one of the official city-level activities, bringing together many major events such as art performances, exhibitions, creative spaces, light shows and modern technology.

== Preparation ==
In this series of activities, the most prominent event is the light show using unmanned aerial vehicles, also known as drones. With the number of devices mobilized up to 10,500 units, the event marks the largest number of drones ever mobilized in Vietnam. This number is not only to create a technical and artistic mark, but also aims to set a national record, and approach the world record previously held by the company itself. The performance content is elaborately designed with many moving images in the air showing cultural, historical, and architectural symbols of Ho Chi Minh City such as Ben Thanh Market, City Post Office, Notre Dame Cathedral, Metro Line 1, images of Uncle Ho, and messages about peace, solidarity and sustainable development.

The program was held at Saigon Riverside Park in Thu Duc City. The performance was originally scheduled for May 1, 2025. However, the city decided to add a trial performance on April 30. The event was held after the fireworks and theatrics. The event was organized by the Department of Culture and Sports of Ho Chi Minh City and the Ho Chi Minh City People's Committee, with the main sponsorship from Vietnam Payment Solution Joint Stock Company (VNPay). The entire drone performance was carried out by DAMODA Intelligent Control Technology Co., Ltd, a technology company from China, which set a world record with a 10,200 drone performance in Shenzhen in 2024.

== Subsequent events ==
The May 1 Drone Show, was cancelled citing safety reasons and negative reaction towards VNPay advertising during the performance.
