= Heritage High School =

Heritage High School is the name of several high schools:

== Canada ==
- Heritage Regional High School, St-Hubert, Quebec

== United Kingdom ==
- Heritage High School, Clowne, Derbyshire, England

== United States ==
- Heritage High School (Brentwood, California)
- Heritage High School (Romoland, California)
- Heritage High School (Littleton, Colorado)
- Heritage High School (Palm Bay, Florida)
- Heritage High School (Conyers, Georgia)
- Heritage High School (Ringgold, Georgia)
- Heritage High School (Monroeville, Indiana)
- Heritage High School (Baltimore, Maryland)
- Heritage High School (Saginaw, Michigan)
- Heritage High School (Wake Forest, North Carolina)
- Heritage High School (Maryville, Tennessee)
- Heritage High School (Frisco, Texas)
- Heritage High School (Leesburg, Virginia)
- Heritage High School (Lynchburg, Virginia)
- Heritage High School (Newport News, Virginia)
- Heritage High School (Vancouver, Washington)
- Rogers Heritage High School, Rogers, Arkansas
- Colleyville Heritage High School, Colleyville, Texas

== See also ==
- Heritage (disambiguation)
- Heritage School (disambiguation)
- American Heritage School (disambiguation)
- Christian Heritage School (disambiguation)
- Heritage Academy (disambiguation)
- Heritage College (disambiguation)
