= American Heritage School =

American Heritage School may refer to:

- American Heritage School (Florida)
- American Heritage School (Utah)

== See also ==
- Heritage (disambiguation)
- Heritage School (disambiguation)
- Heritage High School (disambiguation)
- Christian Heritage School (disambiguation)
- Heritage Academy (disambiguation)
- Heritage College (disambiguation)
