= Ben McEnroe =

American football coach

Current position
- Title: Head coach
- Team: North Hills (CA)
- Conference: Ironwood League League
- Record: 0–0

Biographical details
- Education: Cal Lutheran ‘93

Playing career
- 1989: Bakersfield
- 1990–1992: Cal Lutheran
- Position: Center

Coaching career (HC unless noted)
- 1993–1998: Cal Lutheran (OL)
- 1999–2002: Humboldt State (OL)
- 2003–2006: Chaminade Prep (CA)
- 2007–2021: Cal Lutheran
- 2023–present: Thousand Oaks HS (CA)

Head coaching record
- Overall: 74–48 (college); 63–34 (high school)
- Tournaments: 0–4 (NCAA D-III playoffs)

Accomplishments and honors

Championships
- 5 SCIAC (2007, 2009–2012)

Ben McEnroe is an American football coach. He is the head football coach at Heritage Christian School in North Hills, California, a position he had held since 2025. McEnroe served as the head football coach at California Lutheran University in Thousand Oaks, from 2007 to 2021, compiling a record of 74–48. As a high school coach, every team McEnroe has coached has appeared in the playoffs, winning three league championships and advancing to the CIF semi-finals three times. Prior to coaching at Cal Lutheran, he was the head football coach at Chaminade College Preparatory School in West Hills, California from 2003 to 2006.

== Playing career ==
As a player, McEnroe played as a linebacker and an offensive lineman at Taft Union High School in Taft, California from 1984 to 1987. During high school, he earned First Team All-SSL Offense and Defense and was picked to the Bakersfield Californian All-Area team. During his high school career, he was also voted the Most Valuable Lineman and Team Captain. In 1989, he played for Bakersfield College before playing for the Cal Lutheran Kingsmen during the 1991 and 1992 seasons. At Cal Lutheran, he received First Team All-SCIAC at Center and also Most Inspirational Player honors as team captain for the football team in his senior year. In his senior year, 1992, he was also named to the All-SCIAC first team.

== Coaching career ==
McEnroe started his career as an offensive line coach right after college. He was the offensive line coach at Cal Lutheran from 1993 to 1998. In 2003, he became Head Coach for the Chaminade College Prep High School in West Hills, California. He led the program there to the CIF playoffs four times and earned a 2006 league title. Several of his former Chaminade players have enjoyed professional sports careers, including Logan Paulsen for the San Francisco 49ers, Ryan Griffin for the Tampa Bay Buccaneers, and Kevin Pillar for the Toronto Jays.

McEnroe was the offensive line coach at Humboldt State University in 1999 to 2002 and was hired as head football coach at West Hills Chaminade in 2003. He had been a coach at West Hills Chaminade High School the last four years when he was hired at California Lutheran in 2007. After over ten years of coaching, he became the fourth head football coach in the history of Cal Lutheran. In his four years as coach of the Chaminade Eagles, the team compiled a 32–16 record with four consecutive CIF playoff appearances and a top 10 ranking each year. The team won the Mission League Championship and advanced to the CIF semifinals.

At Cal Lutheran, McEnroe led the Kingsmen to five Southern California Intercollegiate Athletic Conference (SCIAC) titles, including four consecutive championships from 2009 to 2012.

McEnroe was hired as the head football coach at Thousand Oaks High School in 2023.

== Personal life ==
McEnroe's wife, Kami, is a coach for the California Lutheran's cheerleading squad. They met at Bakersfield College, where Ben played and Kami was a cheerleader. McEnroe has been married to Kami since 1985, and they have three children, Kassidy, Cory and Kylie. He earned a bachelor's degree in history (1993) and a Master of Arts degree in education (1999) from Cal Lutheran.

== Head coaching record ==
=== College ===
Year	Team	Overall	Conference	Standing	Bowl/playoffs
Cal Lutheran Kingsmen (Southern California Intercollegiate Athletic Conference) (2007–2021)
2007	Cal Lutheran	5–4	5–1	T–1st	
2008	Cal Lutheran	7–2	5–1	2nd	
2009	Cal Lutheran	8–2	6–0	1st	L NCAA Division III First Round
2010	Cal Lutheran	8–2	6–0	1st	L NCAA Division III First Round
2011	Cal Lutheran	8–2	6–0	1st	L NCAA Division III First Round
2012	Cal Lutheran	8–2	7–0	1st	L NCAA Division III First Round
2013	Cal Lutheran	4–5	4–3	T–3rd	
2014	Cal Lutheran	4–5	4–3	T–3rd	
2015	Cal Lutheran	4–5	2–5	6th	
2016	Cal Lutheran	4–5	4–3	T–5th	
2017	Cal Lutheran	5–3	3–3	T–3rd	
2018	Cal Lutheran	4–6	3–4	T–5th	
2019	Cal Lutheran	5–5	4–3	T–3rd	
2020–21	No team—COVID-19				
Cal Lutheran:		74–48	59–26		
Total:		74–48			
National championship Conference title Conference division title or championship game berth
