= Heritage Academy =

Heritage Academy may refer to:

== United States ==
- Heritage Academy Longmeadow, Massachusetts
- Heritage Academy in Arizona:
  - Heritage Academy (Laveen, Arizona), part of the Canyon Athletic Association
  - Heritage Academy (Mesa, Arizona)
  - Heritage Academy (Queen Creek, Arizona), Queen Creek, Arizona
- Heritage Academy, Hagerstown, Maryland
- Heritage Academy, Minneapolis Public Schools, Minnesota
- Heritage Academy (Mississippi), Columbus, Mississippi
- Heritage Academy (Columbia, Missouri), Columbia, Missouri
- Heritage Academy, Hilton Head Island, South Carolina

== Elsewhere ==
- Heritage Academy (Pietermaritzburg), KwaZulu-Natal, South Africa
- The Heritage Academy, Kolkata, India
- Heritage Academy, Modinagar, Uttar Pradesh, India

== See also ==
- Christian Heritage Academy, Del City, Oklahoma
- Christian Heritage Academy (Northfield, Illinois)
- National Heritage Academies, a for-profit charter school organization
- Heritage (disambiguation)
- Heritage School (disambiguation)
- Heritage High School (disambiguation)
- Heritage College (disambiguation)
