= Cal Lutheran Kingsmen football =

Cal Lutheran Kingsmen
- First season: 1962
- Head coach: Anthony Lugo; 5th season, 20–29 (.408)
- Location: Thousand Oaks, California
- Stadium: William Rolland Stadium (capacity: 4,000)
- NCAA division: Division III
- Conference: SCIAC
- Colors: Violet and gold

NAIA national championships
- NAIA Division II: 1971
- Website: CLU Sports

The Cal Lutheran Kingsmen football team represents California Lutheran University, located in Thousand Oaks, California, in NCAA Division III college football.

The Kingsmen, who began playing football in 1962, compete as members of the Southern California Intercollegiate Athletic Conference.

Cal Lutheran have won one national championship, in 1971.

== History ==
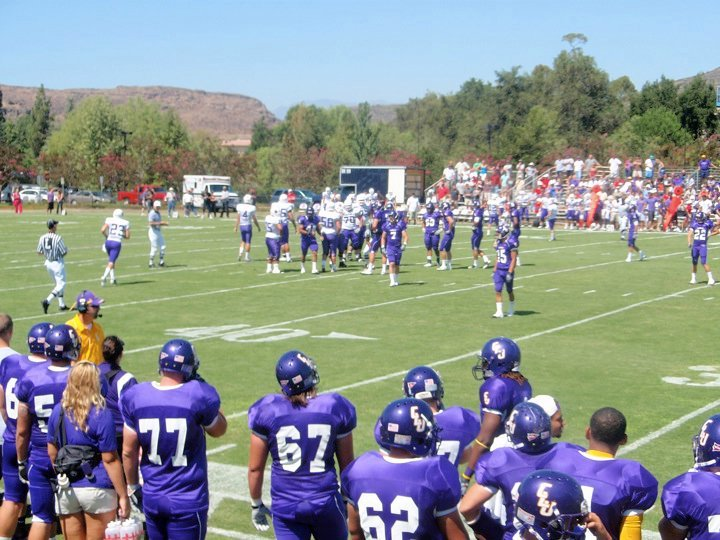
Kingsmen at the Memorial Field (formerly Mt Clef Field), 2010

Luther Schwich made plans to establish the school's first football team in 1962. This was also the same year the sports’ moniker Kingsmen was chosen, which was a compromise between those favoring "Condors" and "Shepherds". Schwich selected Shoup to start the team, a recruiter who had garnered fame at University of California, Santa Barbara, in the mid-1950s. Shoup had also compiled an impressive record at North High School in Torrance prior to his career at CLU. His first assignment was to create a team and recruit players, as well as developing a schedule and securing facilities. The home games were first played at Camarillo High School field. Their first win soon followed, 20–12 over Los Angeles-Pacific. After having played at Thousand Oaks High School for a limited time, Kingsmen football was playing at their own Mount Clef field starting in 1963, a football field on campus which had been readied for the Dallas Cowboys' summer camp. The first game took place in 1964 against University of La Verne, which the Kingsmen won 13–8.

A winning streak began in 1965 and lasted for several years, bringing in an 8–1 record in 1965 ("Year of the Champions"), 8–2 in 1966 ("Year of the Victors"), and 7–2 in 1967 ("Year of the Conquerors"). In 1968, punter Gary Loyd was named an NAIA All-America and the college appeared for the first time in the national rankings, coming in 9th. Robbie Robinson's seventeen field goals in 1969 ("Year of the Warriors") set an NAIA record and the team moved up to 7th place. From its 8–1 record in 1970, the team moved into its greatest season to date in 1971, and captured the NAIA Division II National Championship, winning against Montana Tech and Westminster College (PA) in the playoffs. A college celebration was staged in conjunction with the Dallas Cowboys that won Super Bowl VI on January 16, 1972. Shoup was named NAIA Coach of the Year and also Lutheran Coach of the Year. Following the championship, numerous players were drafted by professional teams, including Brian Kelley by the New York Giants and Sam Cvijanovich who played in the Canadian Football League. Another key performer in the championship game was Mike Sheppard, who later became a professional player for various NFL teams and the head coach at California State University, Long Beach. Successful years followed the championship, and the team soon appeared three times in the NAIA playoffs: in 1975, 1977 and 1982. As of 1984, Kingsmen football was among the top small college teams in the U.S.

In 1987, three players signed free-agent contracts with NFL teams. Mike Miller and John Hynes, both defensive tackles, signed with the Oakland Raiders, and Darren Gottschalk, a tight end, signed with the New Orleans Saints.

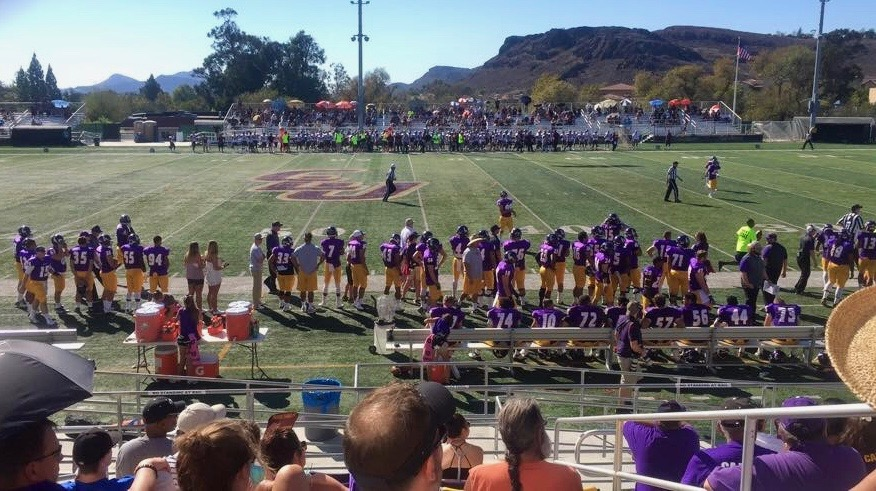
Kingsmen football team, 2015

Cal Lutheran joined the NCAA in 1985 and began playing at the Division II level as a member of the Western Football Conference.

In 1995, Cal Lutheran’s football had three players from Sweden: tailback Fredrik Nanhed, wide receiver John Tynell, and defensive back Mattias Wikstrom. Defensive end Christian Paulsboe was from Norway.

As a SCIAC member, the Kingsmen won the conference championship in 1997, 2007, 2009, 2010, 2011, and 2012. Running back Brian Stuart received the Player of the Year award in 2009. The team has a SCIAC rivalry with the Redlands Bulldogs; the teams battle each other annually for the trophy known as the Smudge Pot, a perpetual trophy introduced to the rivalry in 2012.

=== Conferences ===
- 1962–1969: NAIA Independent
- 1970–1984: NAIA Division II Independent
- 1985–1989: Western Football Conference
- 1990: NCAA Division II Independent
- 1991: NCAA Division III Independent
- 1992–present: Southern California Intercollegiate Athletic Conference

== Past seasons ==
Year	Team	Overall	Conference	Standing	Bowl/playoffs
Cal Lutheran Kingsmen (Southern California Intercollegiate Athletic Conference) (2007–present)
2007	Cal Lutheran	5–4	5–1	T–1st	
2008	Cal Lutheran	7–2	5–1	2nd	
2009	Cal Lutheran	8–2	6–0	1st	L NCAA Division III First Round
2010	Cal Lutheran	8–2	6–0	1st	L NCAA Division III First Round
2011	Cal Lutheran	8–2	6–0	1st	L NCAA Division III First Round
2012	Cal Lutheran	8–2	7–0	1st	L NCAA Division III First Round
2013	Cal Lutheran	4–5	4–3	T–3rd	
2014	Cal Lutheran	4–5	4–3	T–3rd	
2015	Cal Lutheran	4–5	2–5	6th	
2016	Cal Lutheran	4–5	4–3	T–5th	
2017	Cal Lutheran	5–3	3–3	T–3rd	
2018	Cal Lutheran	4–6	3–4	T–5th	
2019	Cal Lutheran	5–5	4–3	T–3rd	
2020	No team—COVID-19				
2021	Cal Lutheran	6–3	3–3	4th	
2022	Cal Lutheran	3–7	1–5	6th	
2023	Cal Lutheran	3–7	2–6	6th	
2024	Cal Lutheran	2–8	2–6	5th	
2025	Cal Lutheran	6–4	4–4	2nd	
Cal Lutheran:		94–77	73–52		
Total:		94–77			
National championship Conference title Conference division title or championship game berth

== Championships ==
=== National championships ===
Year	Association	Division	Head coach	Record	Opponent	Result
1971	NAIA (1)	Division II (1)	Bob Shoup	8–0–2	Westminster (PA)	W, 30–14

== Postseason appearances ==
=== NAIA playoffs ===
The Kingsmen made five appearances in the NAIA playoffs, with a combined record of 4–4 and one national championship.

Year	Round	Opponent	Result
1971	Semifinals; National Championship	Montana Tech; Westminster (PA)	W, 34–6; W, 30–14
1975	Semifinals; National Championship	William Penn; Texas Lutheran	W, 27–0; L, 8–34
1977	Semifinals; National Championship	Linfield; Westminster (PA)	W, 29–28; L, 9–17
1979	Quarterfinals	Pacific Lutheran	L, 14–34
1982	Quarterfinals	Linfield	L, 16–20

=== NCAA Division III playoffs ===
The Kingsmen made four appearances in the NCAA Division III playoffs, with a combined record of 0–4.

Year	Round	Opponent	Result
2009	First Round	Linfield	L, 17–38
2010	First Round	Linfield	L, 26–42
2011	First Round	Linfield	L, 27–30
2012	First Round	North Central (IL)	L, 21–41

== Former players ==
Notable players include Brian Kelley and Sam Cvijanovich, who were drafted for professional football teams after the 1971 NAIA Championship win. Other notable players include Hank Bauer, who retired from the San Diego Chargers in 1982, and Jerry Palmquist who played for the Denver Broncos. Gary Loyd was drafted by the New Orleans Saints, William “Robbie” Robinson by the Pittsburgh Steelers, Gary Hamm by the Toronto Argonauts, Charlie McShane by the Seattle Seahawks, and Russ Jensen by the Los Angeles Express. Other notable football players and coaches of CLU include Tom Herman, Rod Marinelli, Eric Rogers, Cory Undlin, Phil Frye, Pete Alamar, Scott Squires, and Dave Aranda. Ralph Miller became a founding member of the National Football League Players Association and has played for the New Orleans Saints, Houston Oilers, Philadelphia Eagles, San Diego Chargers, New York Giants, and San Francisco 49ers.

== Former coaches ==
=== Cradle of Coaches ===
Cal Lutheran has been called the West Coast’s “Cradle of Coaches”; nearly 1 in 4 of football coach Bob Shoup’s players would go on to coach at some level. 144 players have become football coaches, and several have been drafted to the NFL.

List of notable coaches:

- Glen Alford
- Pete Alamar
- Kurt Amundson
- Kevin Anderson
- Roy Anderson
- Richard Andrade
- Andy Andreolli
- Dave Aranda
- David Banuelos
- Andy Bartsch
- Kyle Barrett
- Hank Bauer
- Jim Bauer
- Scott Beattie
- Mark Beckham
- John Blakemore
- Warren Bloomquist
- Steve Bogan
- Don Boothe
- Mark Bridgewater
- Richard Carter
- Carl Clark
- Doug Clark
- Jake Clayborn
- Bryan Cook
- Chris Culig
- Bill Cullpepper
- Sam Cvijanovich
- Steve Dann
- Rod Dearborn
- Sean Demmon
- Kirk Diego
- Mark Duffy
- Tom Ecklund
- George Engdahl
- Jeff Engilma
- Ed Esrada
- Gary Fabricius
- Kelly Felix
- Chris Forbes
- Phil Frye
- Joe Fuca
- Bob Fulenwider
- Andy Garman
- Randy Gloyd
- Steve Graf
- Eddie Gran
- Sid Grant
- Artie Green
- Doni Green
- Bart Gudmundson
- David K. Gunn
- Mike Hagen
- Steve Hagen
- Gary Haman
- Ron Harris
- Bill Harrison
- Dan Hartwig
- Harry Hedrick
- Chris Heintz
- Bon Hendricks
- Tom Herman
- Jon Hickey
- Brad Hoffman
- R.T. Howell
- Mike Hunkins
- Russ Jones
- Al Jones
- Kent Jorgenson
- Richard Kelley
- Fred Kemp
- Al Kempfert
- Chase King
- Jim Kunau
- Bernie Kyman
- Jeff Lampos
- Danny Langsdorf
- Andy Levy
- Tim Lins
- Jack Lugo
- Greg Lord
- Rod Marinelli
- Ed Martinez
- Chris Matteson
- Bob McAllister
- Mark McElroy
- Ben McEnroe
- Bruce McFadden
- Tom McGarvin
- Gary McGinnis
- Casey McLaughlin
- Joe Monnarez
- Craig Moropoulos
- Dan Morrow
- Bruce Nelson
- Tom O’Brien
- Paul Odden
- John Paris
- Tom Pellegrino
- Skip Piechocinski
- Will Piemons
- Tom Proffit
- Dave Regalado
- Don Reyes
- Scott Rich
- Keith Richards
- Clay Richardson
- Eric Riegert
- Doug Rihn
- Dennis Ritterbush
- William Robinson
- Robbie Sachs
- Rich Sanchez
- Ernie Sandlin
- Tim Savage
- Bill Schwich
- Rick Scott
- Doug Semones
- Ray Shadid
- Mike Sheppard
- Rick Shoup
- Rueben Solorio
- Al Staie
- Kent Sullivan
- Tony Sullivan, Jr.
- Geno Sullivan
- Scott Squires
- Steve Sutherland
- Mark Sutton
- Tom Sweeney
- Bill Turner
- Gene Uebelhardt
- Cory Undlin
- Jim Van Hoesen
- Bryan Wagner
- Tony Paopao
- Jim Walker
- Cary Washburn
- Rich Watkins
- Mark Weber
- Tom West
- Joel Wilker
- Bill Wilson
- Tad Wygal
- Rick Yancy
- Roger Young
- John Zisko
