= Heritage Day =

Heritage Day may refer to:

- Heritage Day (Alberta), a holiday in Alberta, Canada
- Nova Scotia Heritage Day, a holiday in Nova Scotia, Canada
- Yukon Heritage Day, a holiday in Yukon, Canada
- China's Cultural Heritage Day, a holiday in China
- European Heritage Days, a holiday in various locations in Europe
- Finnish Swedish Heritage Day, a flag day in Finland
- Heritage Day (South Africa), a holiday in South Africa
- National Heritage Day, a public holiday in the Turks and Caicos Islands
- Native American Heritage Day, a holiday in the United States
- Heritage Day, a holiday in Easton, Pennsylvania, United States
- Heritage Open Days, a weekend in the United Kingdom
- Heritage Day (Uruguay), a weekend event in Uruguay
