= Public holidays in the Turks and Caicos Islands =

This is a list of public holidays in Turks and Caicos Islands.

Date	Holiday
1 January	New Year's Day
Second Monday in March	Commonwealth Day
movable holiday	Good Friday
movable holiday	Easter Monday
Last Monday in May	JAGS McCartney Day
Second Monday in June	King's Birthday
1 August	Emancipation Day
Last Monday in August	Constitution Day
Last Friday in September	National Youth Day
Second Monday in October	National Heritage Day
25 December	Christmas Day
26 December	Boxing Day
