= Heritage College Cooranbong =

Heritage College Lake Macquarie

Location
- Morisset, New South Wales; Australia; 33°05′55″S 151°30′27″E

Information
- Type: Independent, coeducational, day school
- Motto: Working Together For Good
- Denomination: Christadelphian
- Established: 1997
- Key people: Simon Dodson (Principal)
- Website: Heritage College

Heritage College Lake Macquarie (est. 1997) is a Christadelphian K–12 school located at Morisset, New South Wales, Australia.

Heritage College Lake Macquarie is one of five Christadelphian Heritage Colleges in Australia; the other four are located in Perth, Adelaide, Melbourne and Sydney.

The school motto is "Working Together For Good", As per their website

The school was established in 1997 in a leased site in Cooranbong. In 2013 the new site in Morisset was opened and the school has steadily grown in size since then.

== See also ==
- Heritage Colleges (Australia)
