= The Heritage =

The Heritage may refer to:

- The Heritage, novel by Siegfried Lenz
- The Heritage (European Tour), a golf tournament that was part of the European Tour in 2004
- The Heritage (PGA Tour), a golf tournament that has been part of the U.S. PGA Tour since 1969
- The Heritage at Millennium Park, a skyscraper in Chicago completed in 2005
- The Heritage (film), a Danish drama film
- The Heritage, 2008 album by Her Name Is Calla
- The Heritage School, Kolkata

== See also ==
- Heritage (disambiguation)
