= Reunification Day =

Public holiday in Vietnam

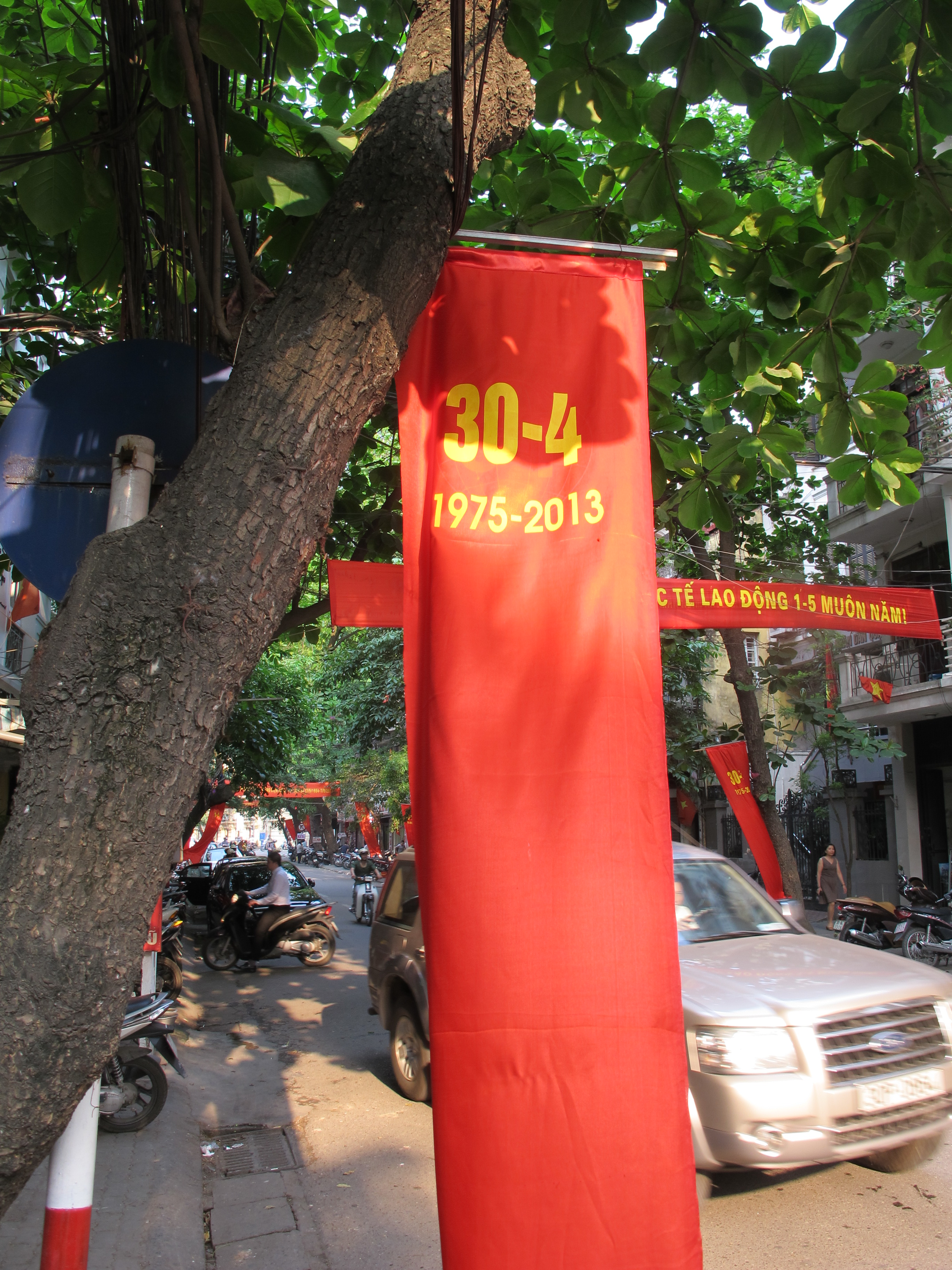
- Banner in Hanoi for Reunification Day, 30 April 2013
- Official name: Day of liberating the South for national reunification (Giải phóng miền Nam, thống nhất đất nước)
- Also called: Reunification Day (Ngày Thống nhất); Liberation Day (Ngày Giải phóng); Victory Day (Ngày Chiến thắng)
- Observed by: Vietnamese
- Type: National
- Celebrations: Parades
- Date: 30 April
- Next time: 30 April 2027
- Frequency: Annual

Reunification Day (Vietnamese: Ngày Thống nhất, IPA: [ɲàj t̺ʰǒŋ͡m ɲʌ̌ʲk]), also known as Victory Day (Ngày Chiến thắng), Liberation Day (Ngày Giải phóng or Ngày Giải phóng miền Nam), or by its official name, Day of the Liberation of the South and National Reunification (Ngày giải phóng miền Nam, thống nhất đất nước) is a public holiday in Vietnam that marks the day when North Vietnam (People's Army of Vietnam and Liberation Army of South Vietnam) captured Saigon (now Ho Chi Minh City), the capital of South Vietnam, on 30 April 1975, thus ending the Vietnam War.

The event marked the start of the transition period of reunification, which also occurred after a vote in the National Assembly for reunification on 2 July 1976, when South Vietnam and North Vietnam were merged, forming the modern-day Vietnam. The 50th anniversary of the day in 2025 was celebrated with a large military parade in Ho Chi Minh City, attended by several officials and army from countries friendly to Vietnam, including China, Cambodia, and Laos.

== Gallery ==
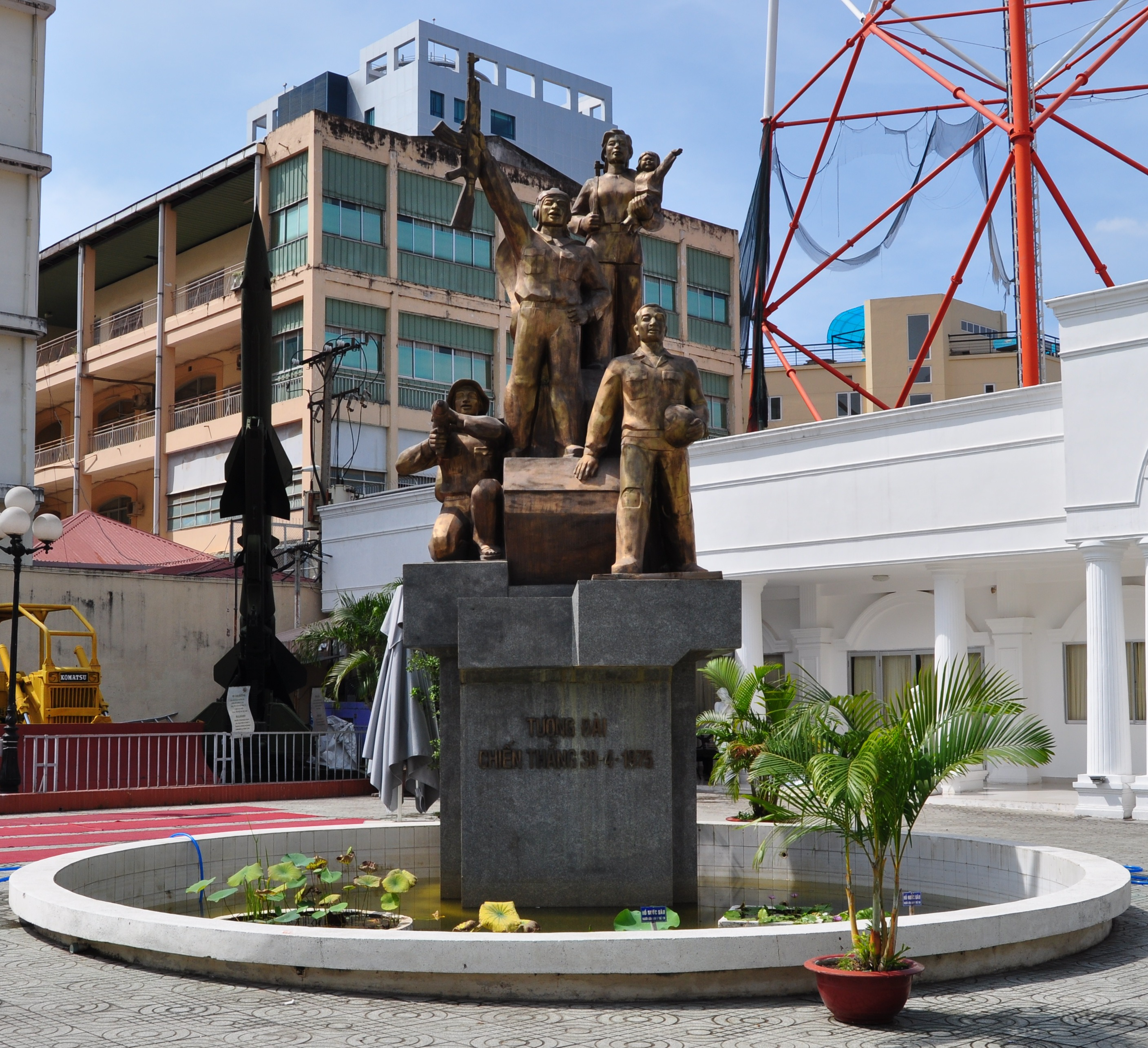
Statue commemorating the "Victory of 30 April 1975" at the Museum of the Ho Chi Minh Campaign

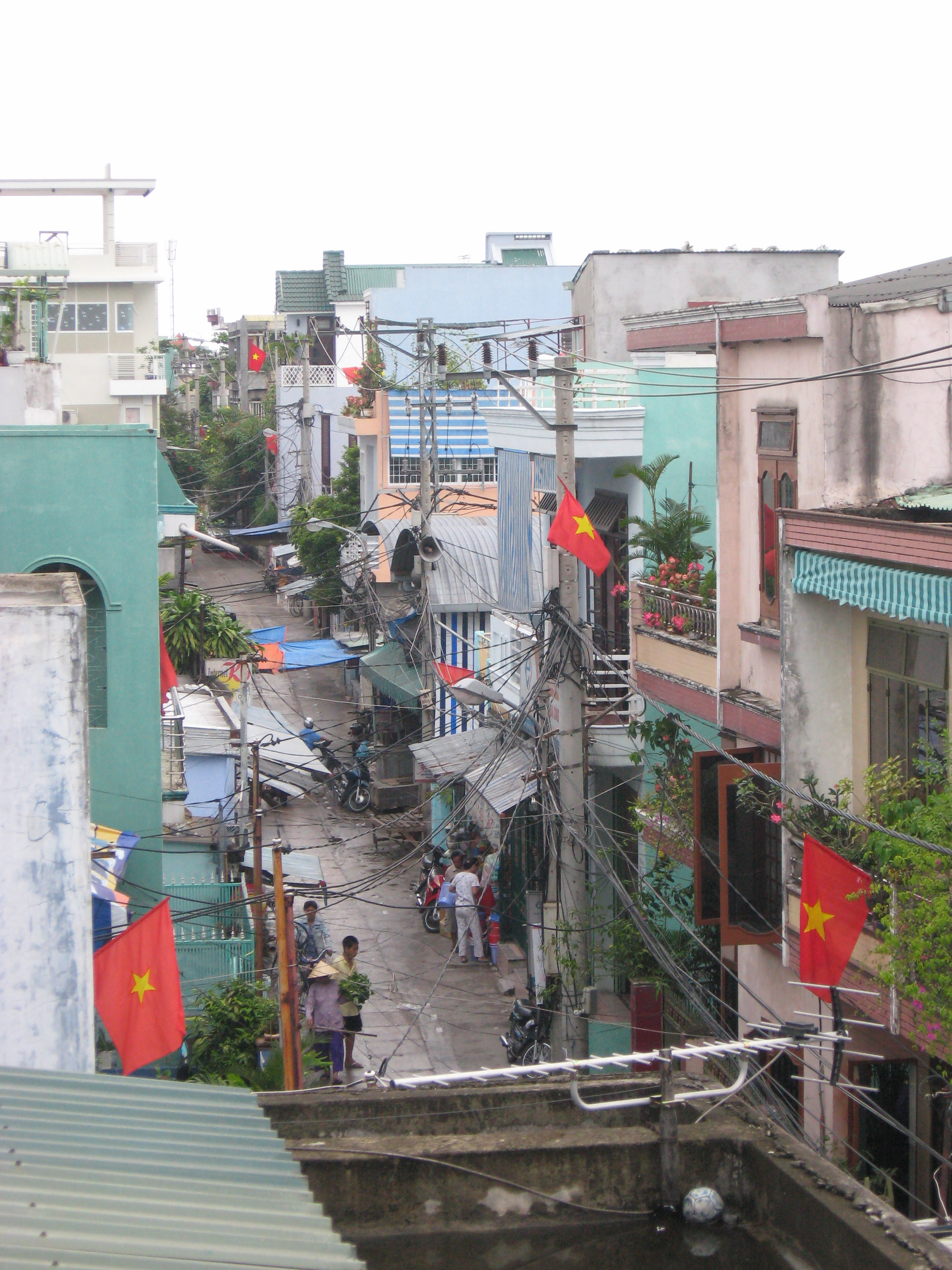
A street in Da Nang, Vietnam. Flags are displayed on the occasion of Reunification Day, a national holiday.

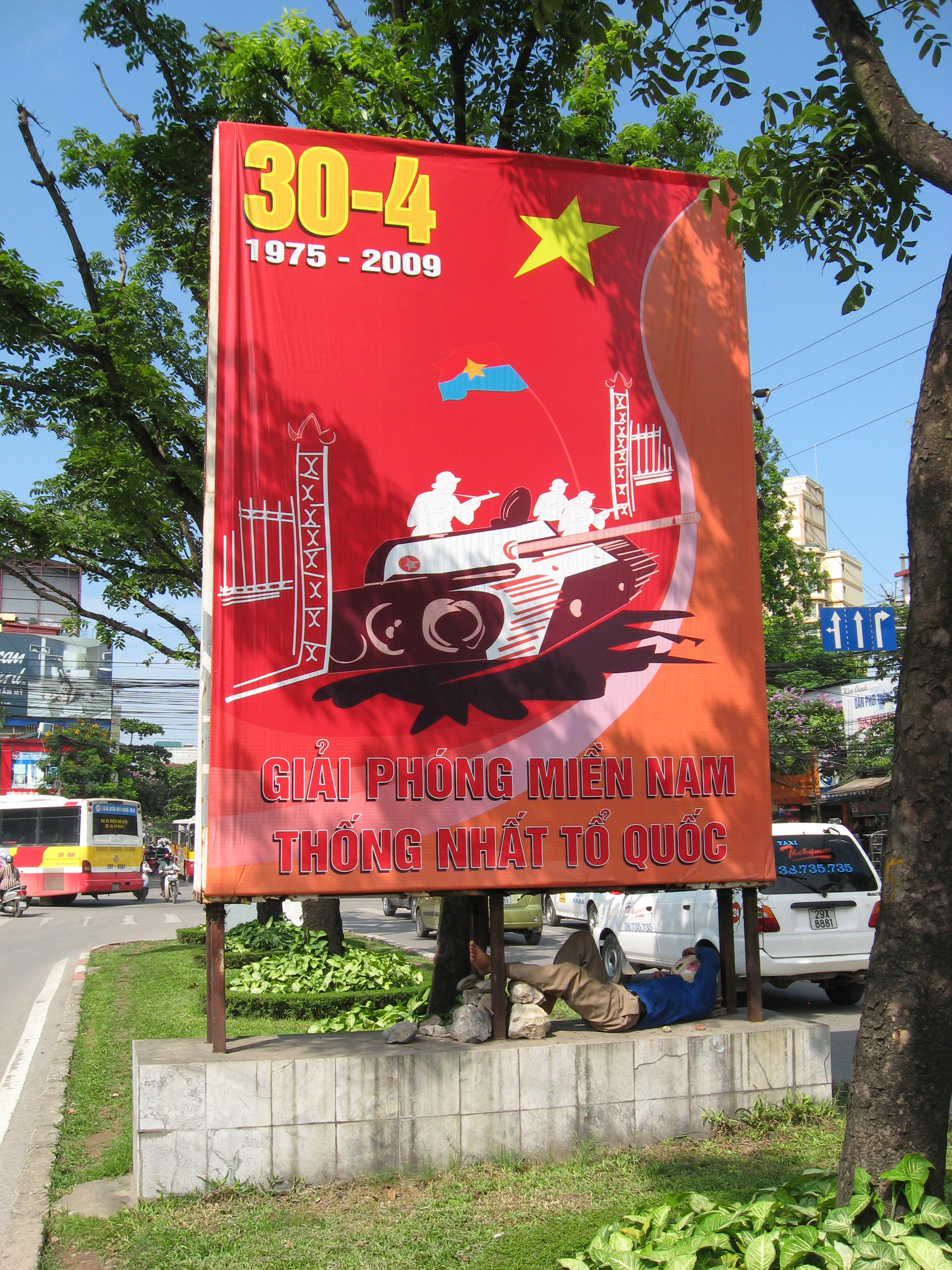
A sign in Hanoi, 2009, depicting the moment the Tank 390 crashed through the gate into the Presidential Palace on 30 April 1975.

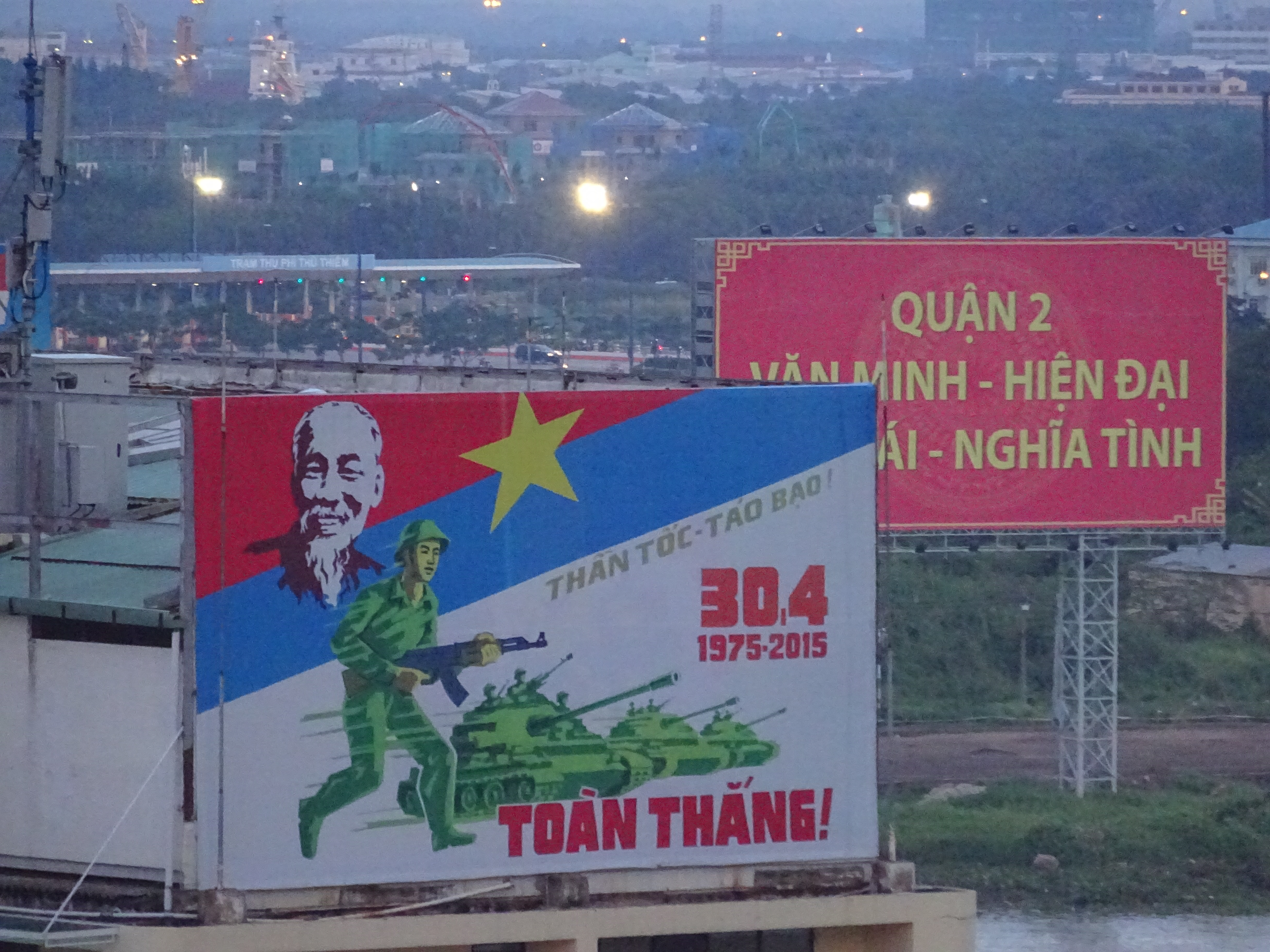
A large road sign in Ho Chi Minh City, Vietnam, commemorating the 30 April 1975. The image bears the declaration of total victory.

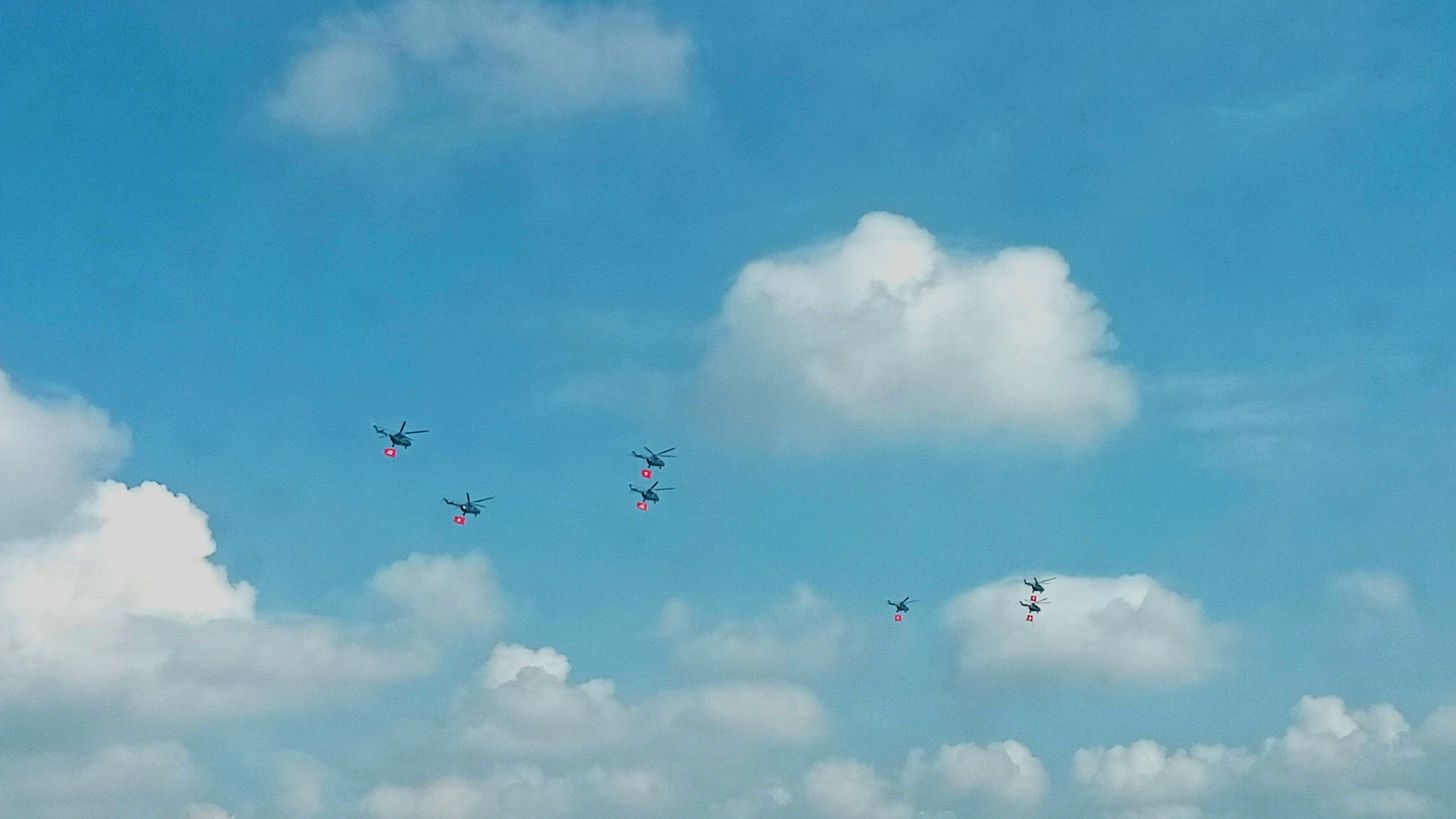
Helicopters flying over Ho Chi Minh City during rehearsals for the 50th anniversary of the Liberation of Saigon.

== See also ==
- Black April
- 1954 division of Vietnam
- Liberation Day in other countries
- Unity Day in other countries
- Victory Day in other countries
- April 30 Park
