= Heritage College Sydney =

Location
- Kemps Creek, New South Wales; Australia; 33°53′00″S 150°47′29″E

Information
- Type: Independent, coeducational, K–12
- Motto: Wisdom Through Knowledge
- Denomination: Christadelphian
- Established: 1998
- Principal: Melissa Sharman
- Website: www.hcs.nsw.edu.au

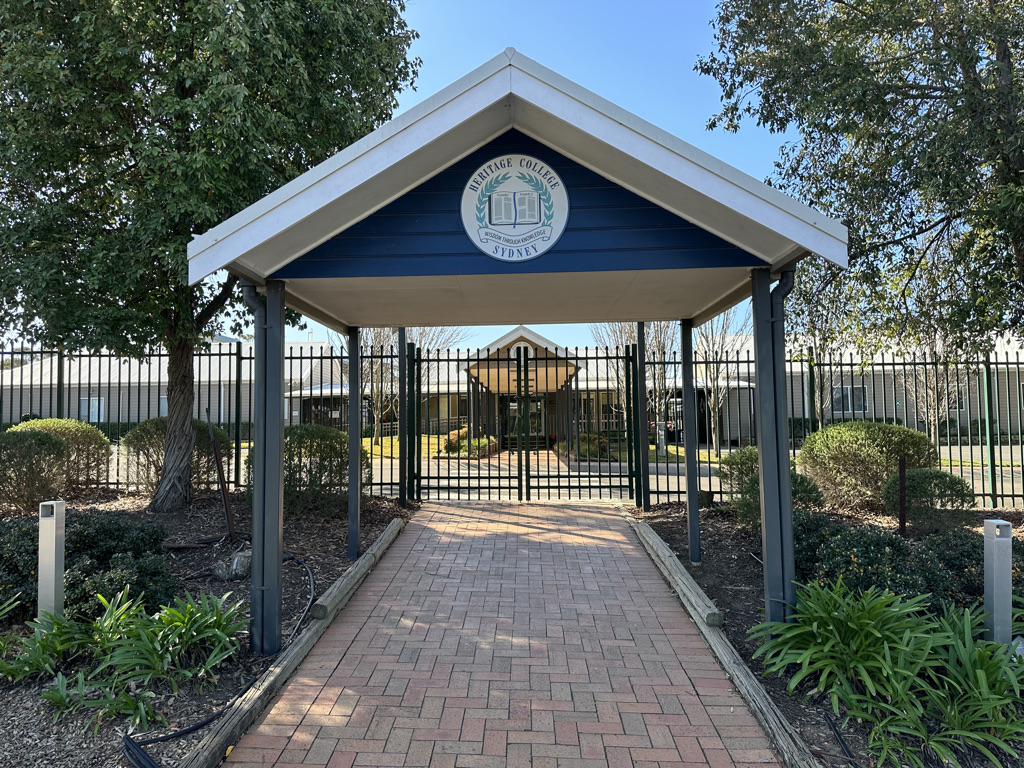
Christadelphian Heritage College Sydney

Heritage College Sydney is a Christadelphian school located in Kemps Creek, New South Wales, Australia. As well as offering education on site the school also offers distance education courses for students in years 11 and 12.

Heritage College Sydney is one of five Christadelphian Heritage Colleges in Australia; the other four schools are located in Perth, Melbourne, Adelaide and Lake Macquarie.

The school motto is "Wisdom Through Knowledge", which is based on the teaching of the first two chapters of the Book of Proverbs.

In recent years, the college has rented its premises on Sundays to a Christadelphian Ecclesia who hold various activities and Bible education seminars throughout the year.

== See also ==
- Heritage Colleges (Australia)
