= Heritage College Adelaide =

Coordinates: 34.85303°S 138.64042°E

Heritage College
- 2-10 Heritage Court, Oakden, SA, Australia, 5086; Oakden, South Australia, 5086; Australia

Information
- Type: Independent, co-educational
- Motto: Follow His Steps
- Denomination: Christadelphian
- Established: 1996
- Principal: Justin Robinson
- Enrolment: 450 (R–12)
- Colour: Maroon Navy
- Website: www.heritage.sa.edu.au

Heritage College Adelaide is an R–12 school founded in 1996 by the Christadelphians who wanted to create a learning environment where the Bible was the basic foundation. The college is located at Oakden in the north-eastern suburbs of Adelaide, South Australia. It has approximately 450 students, as well as a Parents and Friends Community (PFA) and a Past Student Association (PSA).

The college is one of five Christadelphian Heritage Colleges in Australia. The others are in Perth, Melbourne, Sydney and Lake Macquarie.

== See also ==
- Heritage Colleges (Australia)
