= Heritage Party =

Heritage Party may refer to:

- Christian Liberty Party (formerly American Heritage Party), a political party in the United States
- Jathika Hela Urumaya (National Heritage Party), a political party in Sri Lanka
- Heritage (Armenia), a political party in Armenia
- Heritage Party (UK), a UK political party led by former London Assembly member David Kurten
- Heritage Party (Zambia), a political party in Zambia
- Heritage Party (Malaysia), a political party in Malaysia
