= Heritage School, Cambridge =

Heritage School

Location
- 17 - 19 Brookside; Cambridge, Cambridgeshire, CB2 1JE; England; 52.1967°N 0.1229°E

Information
- Type: Private school
- Established: 5 September 2007
- Department for Education URN: 135404 Tables
- Ofsted: Reports
- Headteacher: Jason Fletcher
- Gender: Mixed
- Age: 4 to 16
- Enrolment: 163 as of January 2015
- Website: http://www.heritageschool.org.uk/

Heritage School, Cambridge is a mixed private day school for pupils aged 4–16, located in Cambridge in the English county of Cambridgeshire. The school is housed in three Victorian Buildings within walking distance of Cambridge City Centre, close to the University Botanic Garden, with sports facilities a short distance away. There are approximately 180 pupils, class sizes are small with 16 pupils per class in the Junior school and 18 pupils per class in the Senior school.

Heritage School has been influenced by the philosophy and practice of noteworthy Victorian educationalist Charlotte Mason the founder of the PNEU movement at the end of the 19th century.

== History ==
Heritage School, Cambridge was founded as a preparatory school in 2007 by Jason Fletcher (Headmaster) and Fiona Fletcher (Director of Studies). They started with 16 pupils and 6 members of staff subletting premises from Sancton Wood School at 19 Brookside. In 2010 swelling numbers necessitated expansion into 18 Brookside. In 2011 the school opened their Senior School and the school now holds an independent lease on 17-19 Brookside having undertaken considerable development work to the interior of the building and to the playground and carpark to the rear of the building.

== Principles ==
Heritage School, Cambridge states that the school's Christian ethos lies at the heart of their educational philosophy. Christian beliefs and values are explored in assemblies. Short Scripture readings start the day (a few days a week) to reference both the school's ethos and cultural heritage. Heritage School welcomes pupils from all backgrounds; the school has numerous American expatriate students
