= Christian Heritage School (Tyler, Texas) =

Location
- 961 County Road 1143; Tyler, Texas 75704; United States
- Coordinates: 32°21′29″N 95°23′25″W

Information
- Type: Private Christian
- Motto: Discipling the Nations through Education
- Religious affiliation: Evangelical Christian
- Founder: Barbara Kilkenny
- NCES School ID: A9503964
- Principal: Rachel Wigent
- Teaching staff: 28.6 (FTE) (2019–20)
- Grades: K-12
- Enrollment: 222 (2019–20)
- Student to teacher ratio: 7.8 (2019–20)
- Colors: Red & White
- Athletics conference: Texas Christian Athletic League, Texas Eastern Conference
- Mascot: Patriots
- Website: chstyler.org

Christian Heritage School is a private, coeducational, college preparatory Christian school located in Tyler, Texas. The school houses grades from Kindergarten to Grade 12 and currently has a total school enrollment of approximately 100 students.

== School history ==
In the late 1970s, the evangelical Christian organization Youth With a Mission decided to establish a school for children to serve the greater Tyler, Texas area. The organization purchased a school building and site in the Dixie neighborhood of Southwest Tyler, directly behind Tyler Pounds Field Airport. The name of the school was Dixie School and had been built as a WPA project during the 1940s and had served the immediate area for almost 40 years. The building was purchased from Tyler Independent School District after TISD built the new (and current) Dixie Elementary School, roughly three miles from the old location. YWAM took the school and worked to restore it. The school was renovated to keep the older educational look to it while bringing in modern renovations. The old Dixie School football field was converted to a soccer pitch, and the gymnasium would have a chemistry lab installed inside and locker rooms and weight rooms were added in the second level of the gymnasium. New playground equipment was installed for elementary students and a cafe was built for students to eat lunch in. The school opened officially in 1980.

In the Spring of 2016, James Kilkenny, who had been the Headmaster for almost 36 years, died suddenly. His wife, Barbara Kilkenny, was named Headmistress. Jeff Schapansky who has been the most recent principal at CHS has recently taken a position with another Principle Approach K-12 school in Oklahoma. Rachel Wigent has taken the new role of principal at CHS beginning in 2025 to current.

== Academics ==
CHS has a college preparatory, Christian-centered education. CHS adheres to the Principle Approach education model which their teachers are trained in through ongoing teacher training events, or from the Teachers of the Nations programs run by Youth With A Mission. The standards for admission are somewhat high, as students applying must score at least one grade level on a standardized admission test which is administered prior to being accepted.

Most teachers are from other parts of the country and the world, and as part of becoming full-fledged internationally practiced teachers are not paid for their teaching duties. They rely on donations from school benefactors or sponsors affiliated with YWAM for income. Despite this arrangement, many teachers stay at CHS if they find steady income and continue to teach for many years.

== Athletics ==
High school sports include Men's Soccer, Women's Volleyball, Men's and Women's Cross Country, Men's and Women's basketball, Men's and Women's Track and Field, and Men's and Women's Tennis.

The Men's soccer team has been playing for 25 years and have won more than a dozen conference championships, six state championships, and three private school national titles.

== Notable alumni ==
- Morgan Wade- BMX Rider who has participated in the X-Games. Wade Attended CHS from 1997 to 1999 and played a striker on the Patriot Soccer team.
