= Yolande Welimoum =

Cameroonian actress, director and screenwriter

Yolande Marcelle Welimoum
- Born: October 9, 1988 (age 37)
- Education: University of Yaoundé
- Occupations: Actress, director

Yolande Marcelle Welimoum (born October 9, 1988) is a Cameroonian actress, director and screenwriter.

== Education and Career ==
She studied performing arts and cinematography at the University of Yaoundé I. Her 2016 screenplay Heritage came in second place at the first edition of the Concours du Scenario Festival, which was co-organized by the Écrans Noirs Festival, GIZ and KFW. Heritage addresses the plight of Cameroonian women inheriting family properties, and was adapted into a fictional drama film of the same name. Welimoum premiered the film at Films Femmes Afrique, a festival dedicated to women's topics. While speaking to Deutsche Welle about sexual abuse in Africa's film industry, she said she regularly defends herself against unwanted advances from male directors. Welimoum was one of three people announced as winners of the 20th Écrans Noirs competition.

== Selected filmography ==
- Heritage
