= Heritage College (Calgary) =

College in Alberta, Canada

- Heritage College
- Type: Private
- Established: 2016
- President: Khedr Hassan
- Administrative staff: 15
- Location: Calgary, AB, Canada; 51.0790307°N 114.0288598°W^{a}
- Colours: Navy Blue, Sky Blue
- ^{a}Coordinates of Calgary campus

Heritage College is a provincially accredited private career college located in Calgary, Alberta. Founded in 2014 as the Noor Pharmacy Training Centre, the institute subsequently rebranded as Heritage College in 2016.

== Programs ==
Heritage College offers programs in Healthcare and Business.

=== Healthcare ===
- Express Pharmacy Assistant Program (4-month diploma)
- Medical Office Assistant & Unit Clerk Certificate (6-month certificate)
- Addictions & Community Support Worker Certificate (6-month accreditation)

=== Business ===
- Accounting and Payroll Administration Diploma Program (1-year Diploma)
- Business Administration & Management Diploma Program (1-year Diploma)
- Retail Administration Certificate Program (6 Months Certificate)

== See also ==
- Education in Alberta
- List of colleges in Alberta
- List of universities and colleges in Alberta
