= Ratification Day =

Type of holiday or anniversary

Ratification Day is the name of a number of official or unofficial holidays or other anniversaries which commemorate or mark an important legislative act. A ratification day may celebrate the proclamation of independence of a state, the end of a war, or the ratification of an important treaty. In the United States, it often refers to the day a particular state ratified the United States Constitution.

== United States ==
- Ratification Day (United States)
- Ratification Day (Connecticut)
- Ratification Day (Massachusetts)
