= Heritage Christian School (Florida) =

Private school in Florida, United States

Coordinates: 26.5217381°N 80.0586528°W

Information
- Teaching staff: 43
- Grades: Kindergarten 3 - Grade 12
- Age: 3 to 18
- Enrollment: 635 (2005)
- Colors: Red, blue, and white
- Affiliation: Abeka
- Website: www.heritageeagles.org

Heritage Christian School is a private Baptist Christian school in Kissimmee, Florida for students K-12th grade. It is a ministry of Bible Baptist church and located on church property in east Kissimmee, Florida. As of 2005, their attendance was at 635 students. They currently have forty-three teachers. The Schools colors are red, blue and white.

The Heritage Christian School uses the Abeka Book program for all subjects except science.

The school was originally K-9th grade before expanding to K-12.
