= Heritage College, Perth =

Heritage College

Location
- Forrestfield, Perth, Western Australia; Australia; 31°58′56″S 116°01′11″E

Information
- Type: Independent co-educational primary and secondary day school
- Denomination: Christadelphianism
- Established: 2006; 20 years ago
- Oversight: Heritage Colleges (Australia)
- Principal: Stephen Higgz
- Years: K–12
- Website: www.hcp.wa.edu.au

Heritage College Perth is an independent Christadelphian co-educational primary and secondary day school, located in Forrestfield, a suburb situated in the foothills of Perth, Western Australia.

Established in 2006, Heritage College Perth is one of five Christadelphian Heritage Colleges in Australia; the other four are located in Morisset, Adelaide, Sydney, and Melbourne.

== See also ==
- List of schools in the Perth metropolitan area
