= Heritage Christian School (Oregon) =

Location
- 1679 Southeast Enterprise Circle; Hillsboro, Washington County, Oregon 97123; United States
- 45°30′26″N 122°58′2″W

Information
- Type: private
- Religious affiliation: Classical Christian education
- Established: 1997
- Closed: 2009
- Principal: Todd Pfaff
- Grades: K-12
- Enrollment: 222
- Campus: Suburban
- Colors: Navy blue, burgundy & green
- Athletics conference: OSAA 1A-1 The Valley 10 League
- Team name: Knights
- Accreditation: NAAS
- Website: www.heritagechristian.com

Heritage Christian School was a private, non-denominational Christian school in Hillsboro, Oregon, United States. Opened in 1997, the school offered classes from kindergarten through twelfth grade before closing in 2009. The school was part of the Classical Christian education movement and had 222 students in its final year.

== History ==
Heritage Christian School was started as a school for seventh, eighth, and ninth grades by the Valley Evangelical Christian School Commission in 1997. Plans called for the school to emphasis biblical principles and ethics, and to become a full high school. A kick off for the school was held at the Hillsboro Public Library at Shute Park on September 18, with hopes of classes beginning on September 22. However, classes did not begin until September 7, 1998, when 40 students started at the new school.

Classes the first year were held in local churches as four former office buildings were converted to classrooms. These buildings were located at an office complex near Tualatin Valley Highway and River Road in southeast Hillsboro. Heritage expanded by adding a new grade to the school each year. Academics included regular classes, plus courses in Latin, rhetoric, and logic. Enrollment stood at 98 in 1999, and by 2003 the school grew to 140 students. In 1999, the high school was added and the first class graduated in 2002. Republican politician Eileen Qutub, a former Oregon State Senator and member of the Oregon House of Representatives, worked for the school until February 2004 as their director of advancement. Heritage grew to include the sixth grade, and had 141 students in all grades in 2004.

In October 2004, the school received a $3.6 million gift that allowed the school to purchase the buildings on their campus. This allowed the school to save about $16,000 per month in rent with an annual budget at that time of $1.25 million. Tuition varied from $4,000 to $7,000 per year that year. Heritage began the process to become accredited that year by the Association of Christian Schools International and the Northwest Association of Accredited Schools. The later accredited the middle school in 2006. That spring kindergarten through fifth grade was added. Also in 2006, the middle school also became accredited by the Association of Christian Schools International.

By 2005, the school’s enrollment had grown to 149 students. Heritage had three students listed as Commended Students in the National Merit Scholarship Program in 2008. In February 2008, the elementary school portion of the school moved to a permanent home in northeast Hillsboro. Enrollment in 2008 totaled 222 students, with 10 staff members.

The school’s Digital Storm team placed second in January 2009 at the Intel Oregon FIRST Lego League championship tournament. In June 2009, the school closed after graduation on June 5 with a final class of 10 students graduating. Enrollment ended with 170 students in its eleventh year of operation and Todd Pfaff as the last headmaster.

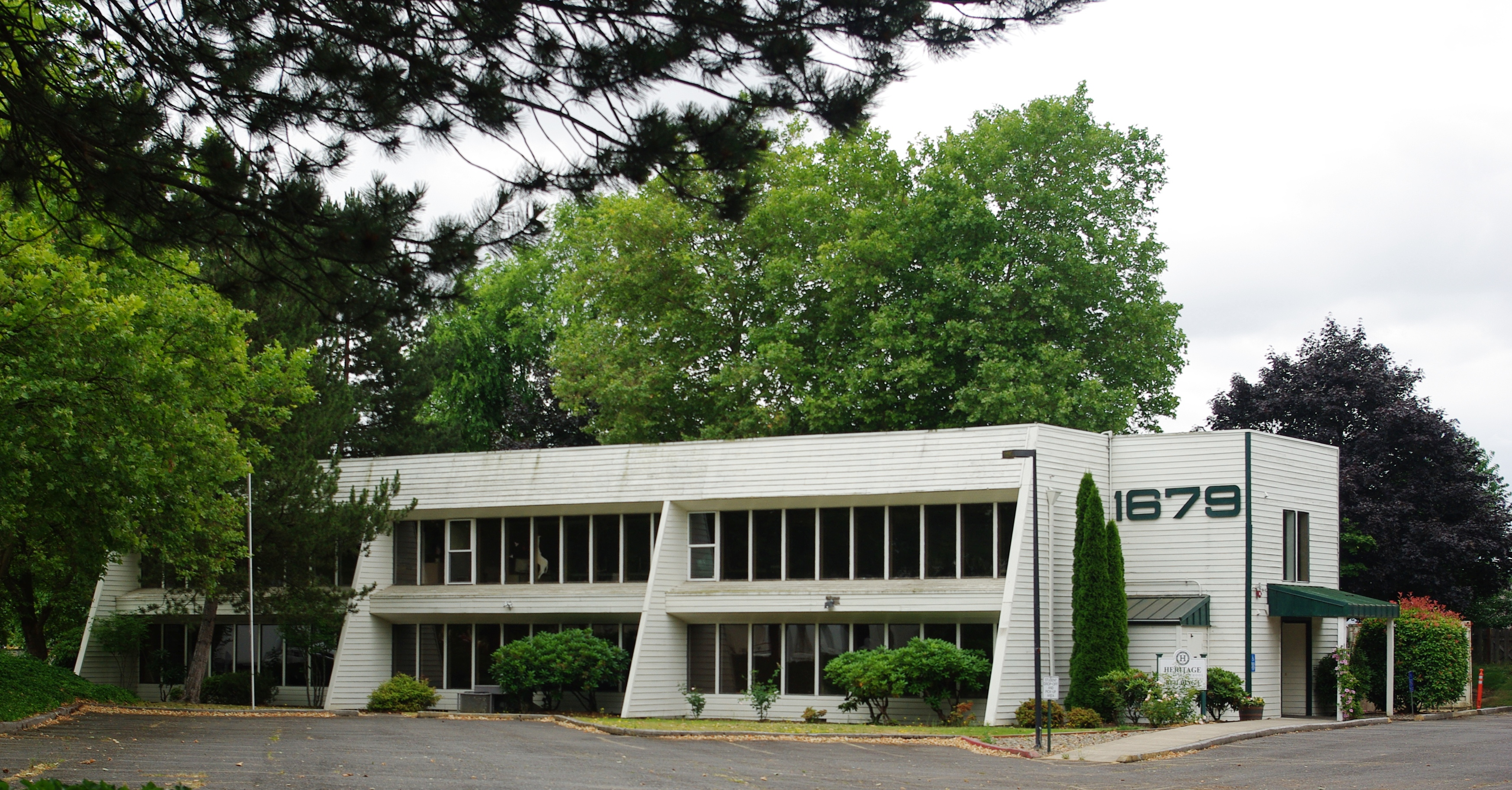
Building on campus

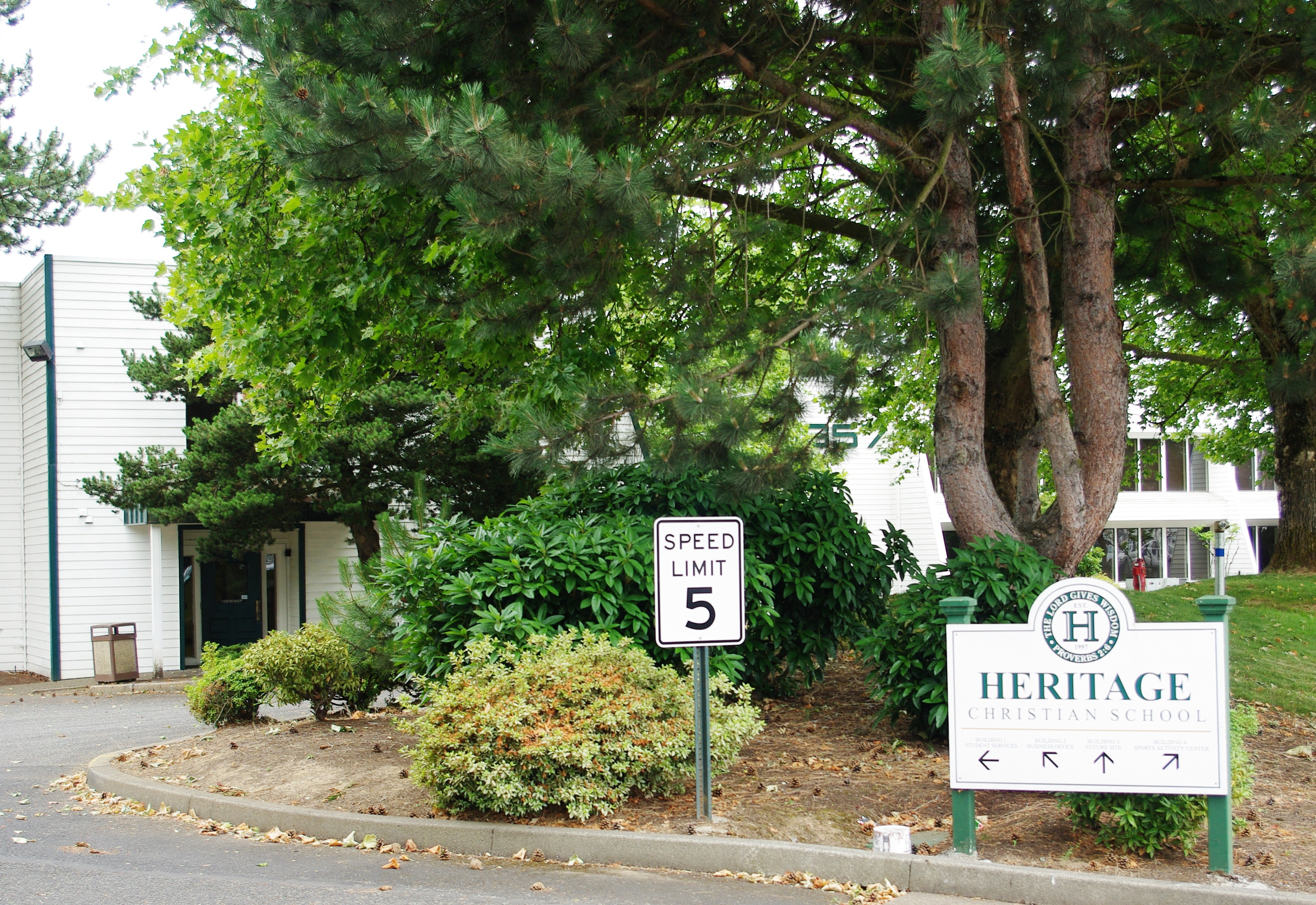
Entrance to the campus

== Academics ==
Academics at the non-denominational school focused on the Trivium. Part of the Classical Christian movement, the Trivium has three components, rhetoric, logic, and grammar, with Latin a major part of the grammar component. Students also studied the Bible, Greek, and Hebrew. The school year lasted 165 days. The four building campus included a gymnasium, computer lab, science laboratory, library, and lunchroom in addition to classrooms. Students at Heritage wore dress shirts or polo shirts along with khakis as part of the school’s dress code.

Heritage was a member of the Association of Classical Christian Schools, a national organization for Classical Christian schools. It was accredited by the Northwest Association of Accredited Schools, and was a member of the Association of Christian Schools International. For 2007 to 2008, the co-educational school had 204 students and 16.8 full-time equivalent teachers. This included 17 seniors, and 194 of the 204 students were White. Approximately 75% of graduates at the school went on to college.

== Activities ==
The school sponsored and held a Latin Olympika where the school faced three other schools with Latin programs in athletic and academic challenges. Events included a chariot race, togas, and a Latin themed quiz. Heritage also held an annual Renaissance week that included era costumes and stocks. The school operated a low-power radio station, KQRZ-LP (96.3 FM).

In athletics, Heritage was known as the Knights with school colors of green, navy blue, and burgundy. Teams competed in the Oregon School Activities Association at the 1A level in The Valley 10 League. Heritage fielded teams in boys and girls cross country, volleyball, boys and girls basketball, and boys and girls track and field.
