= Heritage Christian School (Findlay, Ohio) =

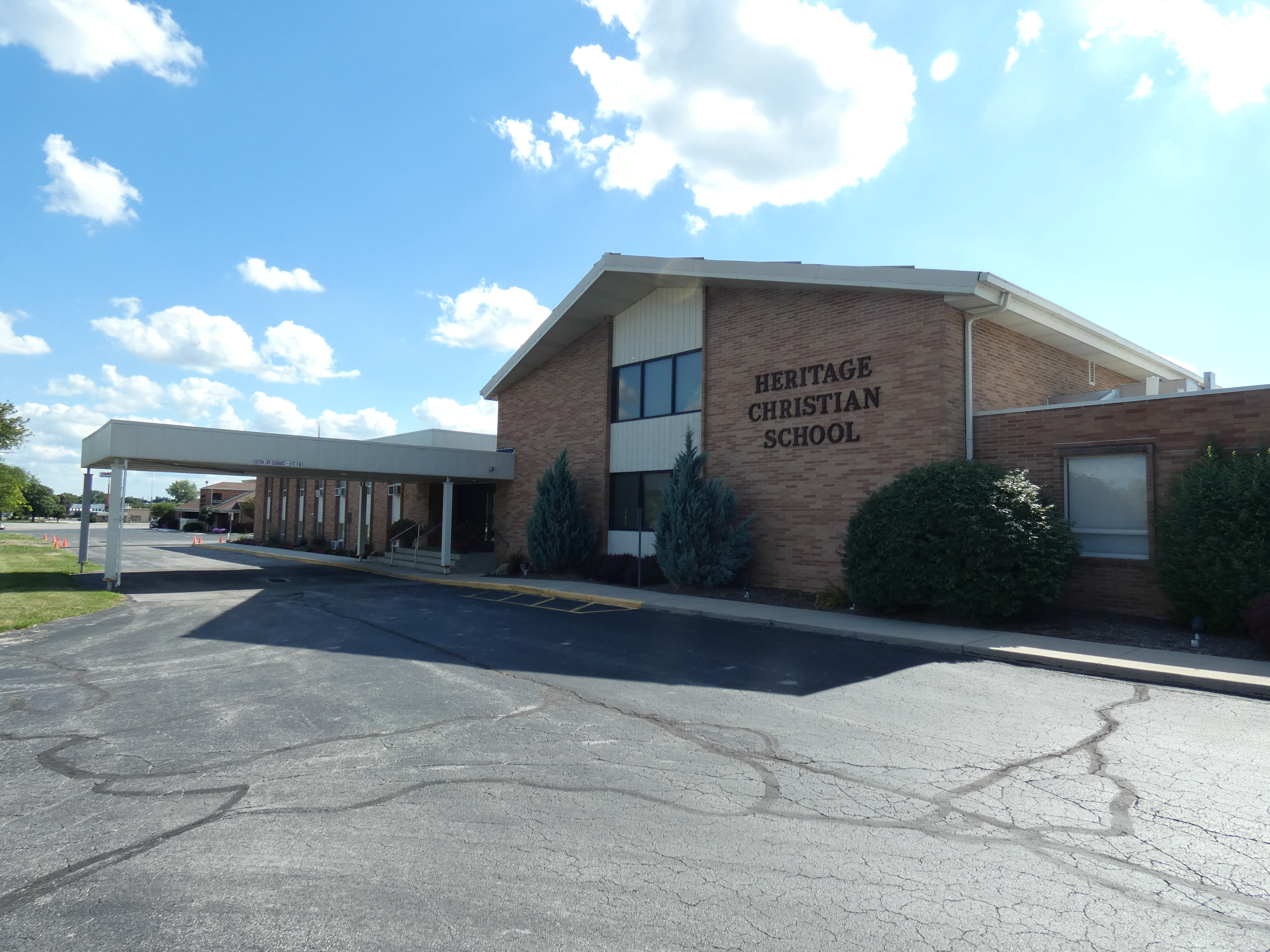
- Front portion of the school

Location
- 2000 Broad Avenue; Findlay, Ohio 45840

Information
- Type: Baptist Christian school
- Principal: Tim England
- Staff: 14 Teachers
- Grades: K–12
- Enrollment: 114 (2023)
- Language: English
- Campus: Suburban
- Colors: white, blue
- Mascot: Minutemen
- Communities served: Findlay
- Website: www.heritagefindlay.org

Heritage Christian School is a private, fundamentalist, Baptist Christian school located in Findlay, Ohio. Heritage is a ministry of Calvary Baptist Church of Findlay, Ohio.

== History ==
The school caught national media attention in 2009 by suspending 17-year-old Tyler Frost for going to his girlfriend's public school prom at Findlay High School. Frost had signed a contract with the school prohibiting dancing at the start of the academic year, though there was a dispute over whether it applied outside of school. The student was not permitted to attend graduation on May 24, 2009, due to his violation of school policy against students listening to rock and roll and dancing. School officials said he could complete his final exams separately to receive a diploma.
