= Heritage Academy Longmeadow =

School in Massachusetts, United States

Heritage Academy Jewish Community Day School
- Heritage Academy front entrance.

Location
- 594 Converse St; Longmeadow, Massachusetts 01106; United States
- Coordinates: 42.0603730°N 72.5409205°W

Information
- Religious affiliation: Jewish
- Founded: 1950
- Faculty: 17
- Grades: K-8
- Enrollment: 36 (as of 2016-2017school year)
- Accreditation: Association of Independent Schools of New England
- Website: http://www.heritageacademy.org/

Heritage Academy is a private independent Jewish day school in Longmeadow, Massachusetts. It serves students in kindergarten through eighth grade and is fully accredited by Association of Independent Schools of New England. The school is not affiliated to any specific Jewish denomination and is a member of RAVSAK, The Jewish Community Day School Network.

== History ==
A charter to organize the Springfield Hebrew Day School was signed on March 1, 1951. The new school was housed in Kodimoh, a synagogue in Springfield, Massachusetts, and the school saw its first graduating class in 1956. A seventh grade was added in 1959 and by 1963, additional classroom space was rented.

In 1964, land in Longmeadow was acquired for the future home of the school and its name was changed to Heritage Academy. Kodimoh moved to a new building the same year, leading Heritage Academy's classes to be held in three locations: B'nai Jacob Synagogue, the Jewish Community Center, and the new Kodimoh location. The school faced closure in April 1966, but school board president Dr. Morris Borenstein appointed a committee to find a new building for the school and one was purchased in December 1966. The school moved into the Wessen House in Springfield where it stayed until 1982. The current building on the school's present site was built in the 1980s, with a wing added in 1995.

Technology has always played a large part within their curriculum; however, in April 2014, Heritage Academy partnered with World ORT to become the first pilot school in the United States to implement their technological program.

== Curriculum ==
The Heritage Academy curriculum is aligned with the guidelines of the Massachusetts State Frameworks. Additionally, students study Jewish texts, history, ritual, spirituality, music and culture. Programs in music, art, library, physical education, academic enrichment, computer technology, science, literature and writing are offered at all grade levels.
