= Heritage Colleges (Australia) =

Group of five private schools in Australia

Heritage Colleges Australia is a group of five private Christadelphian schools in Australia. They are:

- Heritage College Sydney
- Heritage College Lake Macquarie
- Heritage College Adelaide
- Heritage College Perth
- Heritage College Knox (Melbourne)

The name "Heritage College" comes from the Bible passage "Behold, children are a heritage from the Lord, the fruit of the womb a reward" (Psalm 127:3). The schools' mission and values are based on "the principles of the Bible and the Christadelphian faith".

There are other Christadelphian schools around the world in, for example, Ontario (Canada), and California (USA).
