= Heritage Academy (Pietermaritzburg) =

Heritage Academy is a private co-educational boarding and day school situated in the Prestbury district of Pietermaritzburg, KwaZulu-Natal, South Africa. It was founded in 1990. Heritage Academy caters for grades R - 12. It has a Christian ethos and the school curriculum is taught within a Biblical worldview.
