= Unity Day (Russia) =

National holiday in Russia

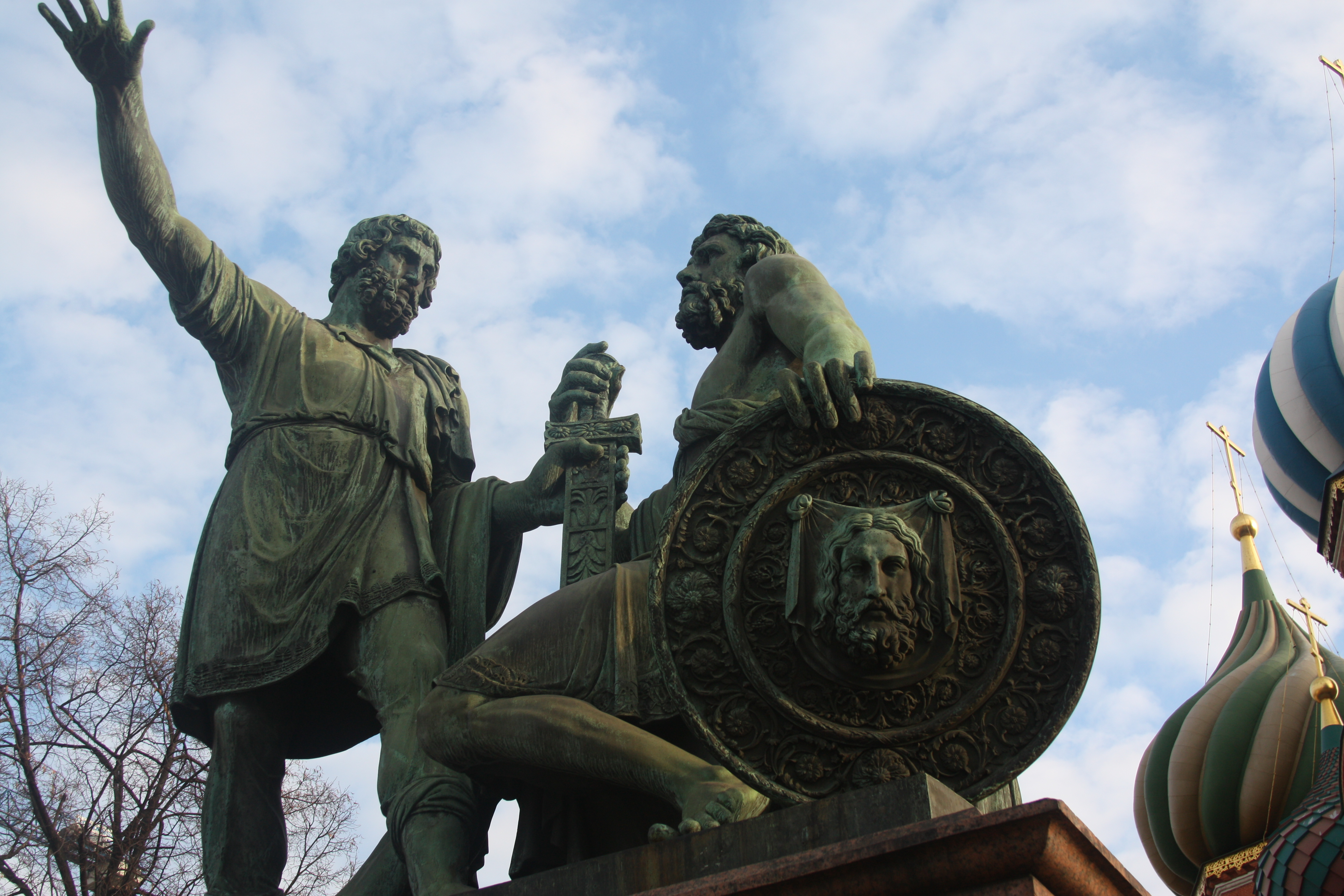
- Monument to Minin and Pozharsky in Moscow
- Official name: Day of People's Unity
- Observed by: Russia
- Significance: The end of the Polish occupation of Moscow in November 1612, and more generally the end of the Time of Troubles and turning point of the Polish intervention in Russia
- Celebrations: Flag hoisting, parades, fireworks, award ceremonies, singing patriotic songs and the national anthem, speeches by the President, entertainment and cultural programs
- Date: 4 November
- Next time: 4 November 2026
- Frequency: Annual

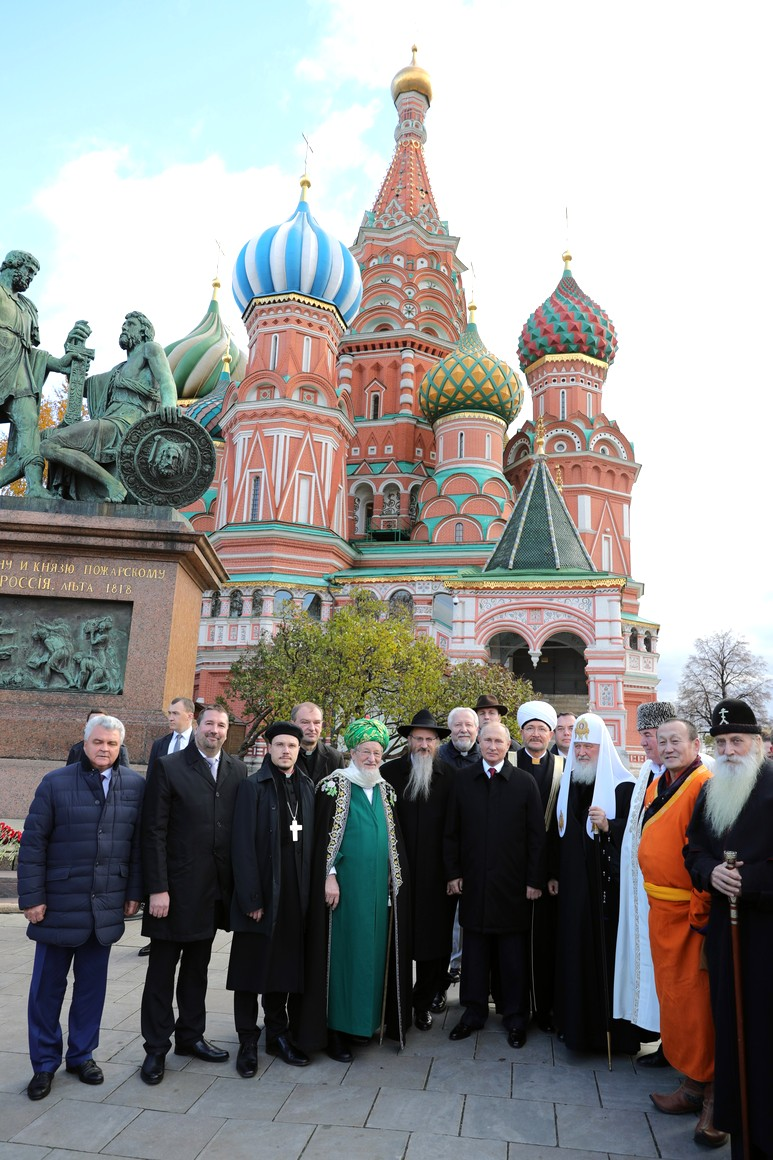
Celebrations at the Monument to Minin and Pozharsky in Moscow, 2018

Unity Day, also called the National Unity Day (Russian: День народного единства, romanized: Denʹ narodnogo yedinstva) and the Day of People's Unity, is a national holiday in Russia held on 4 November [O.S. 22 October]. It commemorates the popular uprising which ended the Polish-Lithuanian occupation of Moscow in November 1612, and more generally the end of the Time of Troubles and turning point of the Polish intervention in Russia.

The day's name alludes to the idea that all classes of Russian society united to preserve Russian statehood when there was neither a tsar nor a patriarch to guide them. In 1613 tsar Mikhail Romanov instituted a holiday named Day of Moscow’s Liberation from Polish Invaders. It was celebrated in the Russian Empire until 1917, when it was replaced with October Revolution Day, a commemoration of the Russian Revolution. Unity Day was reinstituted by the Russian Federation in 2005, when the events of the year 1612 have been celebrated instead of those of 1917 every 4 November since. The day is also the feast day of the Russian Orthodox icon of Our Lady of Kazan.

== History ==
One of the initiators of the establishment of the holiday was Vladislav Surkov:

What is the Russian world? I once introduced this idea into the structure of state policy when we changed ideological dates: we canceled the day of celebration of the socialist revolution and introduced National Unity Day. In Russia, no holiday was associated with events before the Revolution. This day became the day of Russian nationalism in its essence. There was such a task: how to talk about the Empire, about our desire to expand, but at the same time not offend the ears of the world community.

On 29 September 2004, Patriarch Alexy II of Moscow publicly supported the initiative of the Duma to establish 4 November as Unity Day, stating, "This day reminds us how in 1612 Russians of different faiths and nationalities overcame division, overcame a formidable enemy and led the country to a stable civil peace."

On 4 October, the initiative was publicly supported by the first deputy head of the United Russia faction, Valery Bogomolov. In an interview with RIA Novosti, Bogomolov stated that "in 1612, Russia was freed from the Polish invaders, and the 'times of unrest' ended."

On 28 October 2004, in Saratov on Teatralnaya Square, on the initiative of the Public Chamber of the region and the Youth Parliament of the region, an 8,000-strong rally of youth and representatives of public organizations was held in support of the course of reforms carried out by the President of the Russian Federation Vladimir Putin. The speeches voiced support for the initiative to establish the celebration of 4 November as the Day of National Unity, which was included in the Address of the rally participants to President Putin.

On 23 November 2004, a bill was submitted to the State Duma for consideration of amendments to the Labor Code of the Russian Federation: the abolition of the celebration of 7 November - the anniversary of the Great October Socialist Revolution and 12 December - Constitution Day, an increase in the New Year holidays from 2 to 5 days, as well as the introduction of a new holiday on 4 November. The bill's authors are Valery Bogomolov, Oleg Yeremeev (United Russia), and Vladimir Zhirinovsky (Liberal Democratic Party of Russia).

The Duma adopted the bill in the first reading. The communists opposed it.

On 27 December 2004, the draft was adopted in the third reading and became law. 327 deputies voted in favor, 104 (all communists) voted against, two abstained.

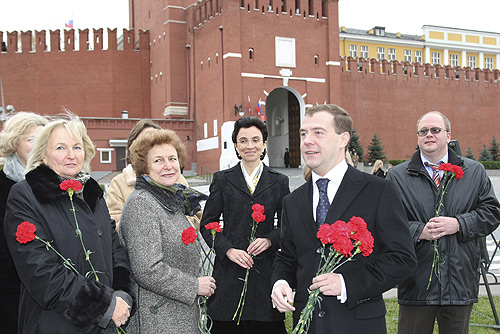
President Dmitry Medvedev offering flowers to the Monument to Minin and Pozharsky in Red Square in 2008

== Reception ==
According to a poll in 2007, only 23 percent of Russians know the name of the holiday, up from 8 percent in 2005. 22 percent identified the holiday as the Day of Accord and Reconciliation, the name of the holiday on 7 November during the 1990s. Only 4% knew that the holiday commemorates the liberation of Moscow from Polish-Lithuanian invaders, and in 2005, only 5%.

== See also ==
- Battle of Moscow (1612)
- Public holidays in Russia
- Russian march
- 1612, a historical film dramatizing the purpose of Unity Day
- Unity Day (disambiguation), in other countries
