= National Unity Day (India) =

Indian national holiday

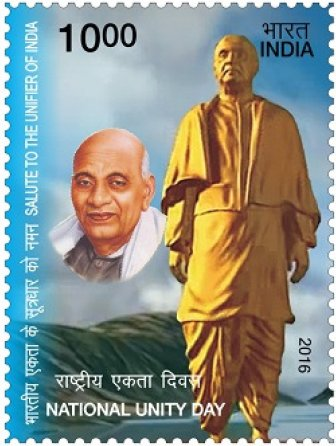
- Commemorative stamp issued on National Unity Day 2016 depicting Statue of Unity and Patel
- Official name: Rashtriya Ekta Diwas
- Type: National
- Significance: Celebrating the birth anniversary of Vallabhbhai Patel
- Date: 31 October
- Frequency: Annual
- First time: 2014

National Unity Day (Hindi: राष्ट्रीय एकता दिवस, romanized: Rāshtrīya Ektā Divas) is celebrated in India on 31 October. It was introduced by the Government of India in 2014. The day is celebrated to mark the birth anniversary of Vallabhbhai Patel who had a major role in the political integration of India.

== Objective and pledge ==
The official statement for National Unity Day by the Home Ministry of India cites that the National Unity Day "will provide an opportunity to re-affirm the inherent strength and resilience of our nation to withstand the actual and potential threats to the unity, integrity, and security of our country."

On the day, a pledge is read out in government offices:

I solemnly pledge that I dedicate myself to preserving the unity, integrity, and security of the nation and also strive hard to spread this message among my fellow countrymen. I take this pledge in the spirit of the unification of my country which was made possible by the vision and actions of Sardar Vallabhbhai Patel. I also solemnly resolve to make my own contribution to ensure the internal security of my country.

== See also ==
- National Pledge (India)
- Ekta Yatra
