= National Unity Day (Belarus) =

National holiday in Belarus

The National Unity Day (Belarusian: Дзень народнага адзінства, romanized: Dzień narodnaha adzinstva, Russian: День народного единства, also translated as the Day of People's Unity) is a state holiday in Belarus celebrated on September 17 and marks the unification of the Western Belarus and Eastern Belarus which happened on September 17, 1939, the day of the Soviet invasion of Poland during World War II. It was established by the June 7, 2021 Decree No. 206 by President of Belarus Alexander Lukashenko. The day of the holiday remains a working day.

== 20th century background ==
the Curzon Line; Grey area: Eastern Borderlands of Poland annexed by the Soviet Union after World War II

After the Russian October Revolution which had led to the collapse and fragmentation of the Russian Empire, during the Russian Civil War the Red Army of the Soviet Russia attempted the Soviet westward offensive of 1918–1919, which goals included regaining the lands of the former Russia and support communist revolutions in Europe. The Polish direction of the offensive resulted in the Polish–Soviet War, which the Soviet Russia lost. The Peace of Riga, signed on 18 March 1921, divided the disputed territories between Poland and Soviet Russia and determined the Polish–Soviet border for the rest of the interwar period. Poland's eastern border was established at about 200 km east of the Curzon Line, a British proposal for Poland's border, previously approved by the Entente leaders as the limit of Poland's expansion in the eastern direction. Belarus and Ukraine became divided between Poland and the Soviet Union, which established the respective Soviet republics in its parts. The detailed description of the events may be found in the book of Norman Davies, White Eagle, Red Star: the Polish-Soviet War, 1919–20.

=== World War II ===
Following the German invasion of Poland on September 1, 1939, the Soviet Union invaded Poland from the East on September 17, 1939 according to the Molotov–Ribbentrop Pact with Germany. After that the territories east of the Bug River (known in Poland as the Eastern Borderlands) were incorporated into the (BSSR and USSR (Byelorussian and Ukrainian Soviet Socialist Republics). In Soviet historiography it was described as "liberating the territories of western Belarus and Ukraine".

== Establishment of the holiday ==
Belarusian historian Ales Kirkevich reminded about the Day of Liberation of Belarus from White Poles, celebrated as a major holiday in BSSR from June 11 until 1939. It was the date when the Red Army expelled the Polish Army ("White Poles") from Minsk in 1920. He described the event as the "prequel" to September 17.

Belarusian historian Sergey Tretyak (Сергей Третьяк) said that the September 17 day was celebrated after World War II as the Reunification Day. But the celebrations were cancelled after 1949 in favor of the friendship with the People's Republic of Poland.

Belarusian politologist in emigration Arciom Szrajbman argues that the pro-Soviet and pro-Lukashenka forces wanted this celebration to be re-established earlier, but probably Lukashenka hoped to maintain good relations with Poland and did not do this. However with the sharp deterioration of the relations of Belarus with Poland in 2020–2021, Lukashenka did what he did.

In February 2021, at the All-Belarusian People's Assembly (convened under the motto "Unity! Development! Independence!" in the wake of the 2020 Belarusian protests) Lukashenka asked which date would be preferable for the celebration, with both suggested days being related to the annexation of the Polish lands. The first date was September 17, the second one was November 14, 1939, when the law on the admission of Western Belarus to the Byelorussian Soviet Socialist Republic was signed at an extraordinary session of the BSSR Supreme Council.

== Reactions ==
On June 8, 2021 The Ministry of Foreign Affairs of the Republic of Poland issued a statement with a strong protest and described this act as "the glorification of Soviet heritage and an attempt to cut Belarus off from its true roots". It stated that "this gesture, in line with Russia’s efforts to reinterpret very difficult history of our region, will seriously hinder Belarusian dialogue and understanding with neighbouring countries as well as all other European countries."

The Polish Institute of National Remembrance described the holiday as the "Holiday of the Unity of the Two Totalitarisms", which hurts the memories of the victims of Hitler's and Stalin's regimes.

Commenting on the September 17 events, Belarusian professor of the Institute of Slavic Studies of the Polish Academy of Sciences Alaksandr Smalanczuk said that in the memories Belarusians of the Western Belarus about that times the foremost issues were the social, rather than national ones: for the whole time the Polish state was the only one about which they knew. Those who lived near the border had an idea what is going on in the Soviet Belarus. However people further to the West, especially where the communists were active, initially greeted the Soviet Army as the "liberators from the Polish oppression". But after meeting with the Soviet reality these sentiments soon disappeared.

== See also ==
- Territorial changes of Poland immediately after World War II
- Territorial evolution of Poland
- September 17 Street; quite a few Belarusian cities have a street with his name
