= Unity Day (United States) =

National holiday in United States

- Type: National
- Significance: Anti-bullying, bullying awareness, solidarity with victims of bullying

Unity Day, the signature event of National Bullying Prevention Awareness Month (observed in the United States on third or fourth Wednesday of October), has been recognized in the United States since 2011. To participate in Unity Day, individuals, schools, communities, and businesses wear or share orange to unite for kindness, acceptance, and inclusion to prevent students being bullied. One in five school-age children report being bullied at school.
