= China's Cultural Heritage Day =

Day is to create a good atmosphere of cultural heritage

China's Cultural Heritage Day is one of the most important part of China's culture contribution, the purpose of this Day is to create a good atmosphere of cultural heritage and to enhance the recognition about the importance of protecting heritage.

Following the Cultural Revolution, the Chinese people were left in a disjointed, beaten-down state of trauma, as a result of mass violence. This was the first realization that the nation required a revitalization of nationalism and morale. Today, the effects of the Cultural Heritage Day are clear through Xi Jinping's China, for he is a leader who greatly emphasizes national pride.

In December 2005, the State Council issued Notice on Strengthening Cultural Heritage Protection, putting up specific requests on the protection of tangible and intangible cultural heritage. The China's Cultural Heritage Day is a yearly event on the second Saturday in June. The Day was first celebrated on 10 June in 2006.
